= List of awards and nominations received by Tupac Shakur =

Tupac Shakur awards and nominations
Awards and nominations
Award	Wins	Nominations
American Music Awards	1	2
Grammy	0	7
MTV VMA	0	3
NAACP	0	1
Soul Train	2	3
ASCAP Rhythm & Soul Music Awards	1	1
Source Awards	0	1

Totals (Note: Certain award groups do not simply award one winner. They acknowledge several different recipients, have runners-up, and have third place. Since this is a specific recognition and is different from losing an award, runner-up mentions are considered wins in this award tally. For simplification and to avoid errors, each award in this list has been presumed to have had a prior nomination.)
- Wins: 7
- Nominations: 13

This is a list of awards and nominations received by the late American rapper and actor Tupac Shakur.

== American Music Awards ==
The American Music Awards is an annual American music awards show.

Year	Nominee / work	Award	Result
1994	Tupac Shakur (as 2Pac)	Favorite Rap/Hip-Hop New Artist	Nominated
1997	Tupac Shakur (as 2Pac)	Favorite Rap/Hip-Hop Artist	Won (posthumously)

== ASCAP Rhythm & Soul Music Awards ==
Year	Nominee / work	Award	Result
2005	Runnin' (Dying to Live) (featuring The Notorious B.I.G.)	Top Soundtrack Song of the Year	Won (posthumously)

== ECHO Awards ==
The ECHO Award was a German music award granted annually by the Deutsche Phono-Akademie, an association of recording companies.

Year	Nominee / work	Award	Result
2002	Himself	Best International Hip-Hop Act	Nominated (posthumously)

== Grammy Awards ==
The Grammy Awards is an accolade by the National Academy of Recording Arts and Sciences of the United States to recognize outstanding achievements in the music industry. The annual awards ceremony features performances by prominent artists, and some of the awards of more popular interest are presented in a widely-viewed televised ceremony. Shakur was nominated seven times.

Year	Nominee / work	Award	Result
1996	"Dear Mama"	Best Rap Solo Performance	Nominated
1996	Me Against the World	Best Rap Album	Nominated
1997	All Eyez on Me	Best Rap Album	Nominated (posthumously)
1997	"How Do U Want It" (featuring K-Ci & JoJo)	Best Rap Performance by a Duo or Group	Nominated (posthumously)
1997	"California Love" (featuring Dr. Dre & Roger Troutman)	Best Rap Performance by a Duo or Group	Nominated (posthumously)
2000	"Changes"	Best Rap Solo Performance	Nominated (posthumously)
2023	"Dear Mama"	Best Music Film	Nominated (posthumously)

== MOBO Awards ==
The MOBO Awards award in "Music of Black Origin", established in 1996 by Kanya King and Andy Ruffell. It is held annually in the United Kingdom to recognize artists of any ethnicity or nationality performing black music. Shakur was nominated and won for Best Video in 1996 for California Love.

Year	Nominee / work	Award	Result
1996	California Love	Best Video	Won

== MTV Video Music Awards ==
The MTV Video Music Award or abbreviated as the VMA, is an award presented by the cable channel MTV to honor the best in music videos. Shakur was nominated 4 times – the first being in 1996 and the last in 2003 – for Best Rap Video.

Year	Nominee / work	Award	Result
1996	"California Love" (featuring Dr. Dre and Roger Troutman)	Best Rap Video	Nominated
1999	"Changes"	Best Rap Video	Nominated
1999	"Changes"	Best Editing in a Video	Nominated (posthumously)
2003	"Thugz Mansion" (featuring Nas)	Best Rap Video	Nominated (posthumously)

== NAACP Image Award ==
The NAACP Image Award is an accolade presented by the American National Association for the Advancement of Colored People to honor outstanding people of color in film, television, music, and literature. Shakur was nominated for this award in 1994.

Year	Nominee / work	Award	Result
1994	Tupac Shakur in Poetic Justice	Outstanding Actor in a Motion Picture	Nominated

== Rock & Roll Hall of Fame ==
The Rock & Roll Hall of Fame is a museum and hall of fame located in downtown Cleveland, Ohio, United States, on the shore of Lake Erie. The museum documents the history of rock music and the artists, producers, engineers, and other notable figures who have influenced its development. Shakur was posthumously selected as one of the inductees for the Rock & Roll Hall of Fame's Class of 2017 during his first year of eligibility. He was inducted into the Rock & Roll Hall of Fame on April 7, 2017, making him the first solo rapper and the sixth hip hop artist to be inducted in the Hall of Fame's 30-year history.

Year	Nominee / work	Award	Result
2017	Tupac Shakur	Rock and Roll Hall of Fame	Inducted (posthumously)

== Soul Train Awards ==
The Soul Train Music Awards is an annual award show which honors the best in Black music and entertainment. Shakur was nominated three times, first in 1996 for Best Rap Album and then in 1997 for R&B/Soul or Rap Album of the Year and Best R&B/Soul or Rap Music Video. He won two awards out of three nominations.

Year	Nominee / work	Award	Result
1996	Me Against the World	Best Rap Album	Won
1997	All Eyez on Me	R&B/Soul or Rap Album of the Year	Won (posthumously)
1997	"How Do You Want It" / "California Love"	Best R&B/Soul or Rap Music Video	Nominated (posthumously)

== Source Awards ==
The Source Awards is an annual award show created by The Source magazine which honors hip-hop and R&B performers for their contributions to hip-hop. Shakur was nominated in 2003 for Single of the Year (Male Solo Artist).

Year	Nominee / work	Award	Result
2003	"Thugz Mansion" (Featuring Anthony Hamilton)	Single of the Year (Male Solo Artist)	Nominated (posthumously)
