= All Eyez on Me (film) =

2017 film by Benny Boom

- Theatrical release poster
- Directed by: Benny Boom
- Written by: Jeremy Haft; Eddie Gonzalez; Steven Bagatourian
- Produced by: David Robinson; L.T. Hutton; James G. Robinson
- Starring: Demetrius Shipp Jr.; Kat Graham; Lauren Cohan; Hill Harper; Danai Gurira
- Cinematography: Peter Menzies Jr.
- Edited by: Joel Cox
- Music by: John Paesano
- Production companies: Morgan Creek Entertainment; The Program Pictures; Codeblack Films
- Distributed by: Lionsgate Films (under Summit Entertainment; United States); Voltage Pictures (International)
- Release dates: June 14, 2017 (Fox Bruin Theater); June 16, 2017 (United States)
- Running time: 140 minutes
- Country: United States
- Language: English
- Budget: $40–45 million
- Box office: $55.7 million

All Eyez on Me is a 2017 American biographical drama film directed by Benny Boom. Named after the 1996 studio album, it follows the life and death of hip-hop artist Tupac Shakur. The film stars Demetrius Shipp Jr. as Tupac, with Kat Graham, Lauren Cohan, Hill Harper, and Danai Gurira. Jamal Woolard reprises his role as The Notorious B.I.G. from Notorious (2009).

Talks of a Tupac biopic began in 2011 by Morgan Creek Entertainment. The film languished in development hell for several years with various directors, including Antoine Fuqua and John Singleton, attached at different points before Boom was confirmed in November 2015. That December, Shipp Jr., whose father worked on music videos with Shakur, was cast as the rapper and principal photography began that month. It lasted until April 2016, filming in Atlanta, Las Vegas, and Los Angeles.

All Eyez on Me premiered on June 14, 2017, at the Fox Bruin Theater and was released by Lionsgate Films (under Summit Entertainment) in the United States, with Voltage Pictures releasing in other territories on June 16, 2017, on what would have been Shakur's 46th birthday. The film was unsuccessful at the box office, grossing $55 million against a budget of about $40–45 million, and received generally negative reviews from critics.

== Plot ==
At the Clinton Correctional Facility in 1995, a documentary filmmaker arrives to interview Tupac Shakur. In a flashback to 1971, Tupac's mother, Afeni Shakur, and other Black Panther Party members are released from prison following acquittal. From an early age, Tupac, instilled with black pride, witnesses multiple injustices in his neighborhood. His stepfather, Mutulu, a revolutionary, is caught by the FBI for an armored-truck robbery and murder. As Tupac gets older, he distances himself from his mother's revolutionary ideals. He attends the Baltimore School for the Arts, where he becomes friends with Jada Pinkett.

Tupac's music career begins when he joins Digital Underground for their hit "Same Song". Under manager Atron Gregory, he begins to have hip-hop albums produced. Although his music becomes popular, some songs' controversial lyrics cause tensions between him and his record producers. Tupac begins acting in movies such as Juice, as well as collaborating with performers including Biggie Smalls. He generates both praise and controversy.

Tupac finds himself beaten by police officers over jaywalking. Another time, after he and E.D.I. Mean, a member of 2Pac's group called, "Outlawz" intervene when two white male who turn out to be off-duty police officers assault a black man, Tupac is arrested for shooting at the cops. Tupac develops a contentious relationship with a Brooklyn gangster named Nigel.

In 1993, Tupac goes on trial for rape and harassment charges. On November 30, 1994, he is attacked and robbed by three men from Brooklyn in the lobby of Quad Recording Studios, is shot five times before the men flee, and is hospitalized. The following day, Tupac is found not guilty of rape, but found guilty of illegal touching, and sentenced to eighteen months in prison.

While in prison, Tupac hears Biggie's song "Who Shot Ya?", and interprets it as a diss track bragging about Biggie's alleged involvement in his shooting. Tupac, who is assaulted by two guards while in prison, eventually is released and signs to Death Row Records under Suge Knight. Tupac and label-mate Dr. Dre work on the hit song "California Love". (Note: This scene uses archive footage from the film 2015 biographical drama Straight Outta Compton using the scene where Tupac is recording "California Love" with Dr. Dre.) He releases the track "Hit Em Up" as a response to "Who Shot Ya?" in which Tupac brags about supposedly having an affair with Biggie's wife Faith Evans. Tupac parts ways with Death Row to launch his own company. Later, Suge offers Tupac a chance to become partners, and Tupac agrees to head Death Row's East Coast operations.

On September 7, 1996, Tupac, Suge, and other members of the M.O.B. Pirus are leaving the Mike Tyson vs. Bruce Seldon boxing match at the MGM Grand Las Vegas. They confront a Southside Compton Crips gang member named Orlando Anderson who had jumped a Blood member named Trevon Lane. Tupac knocks him to the ground, leading to a brawl. Tupac stops by his hotel to change clothes, and tells Kidada he will return in an hour from performing at Club 662. With Suge, Tupac is at the intersection of Flamingo Road and Koval Lane when a Cadillac pulls alongside Suge's BMW and from the backseat an arm with a leather glove on & a Glock 17 shoots Tupac multiple times before fleeing the scene. Onscreen text states that Tupac was pronounced dead six days later at age 25. Tupac had released 9 platinum albums, 7 posthumous albums, 75 million albums sold, 713 songs, and 7 movies, all by the age of 25. It has been two decades since his death and his murder remains unsolved.

== Cast ==
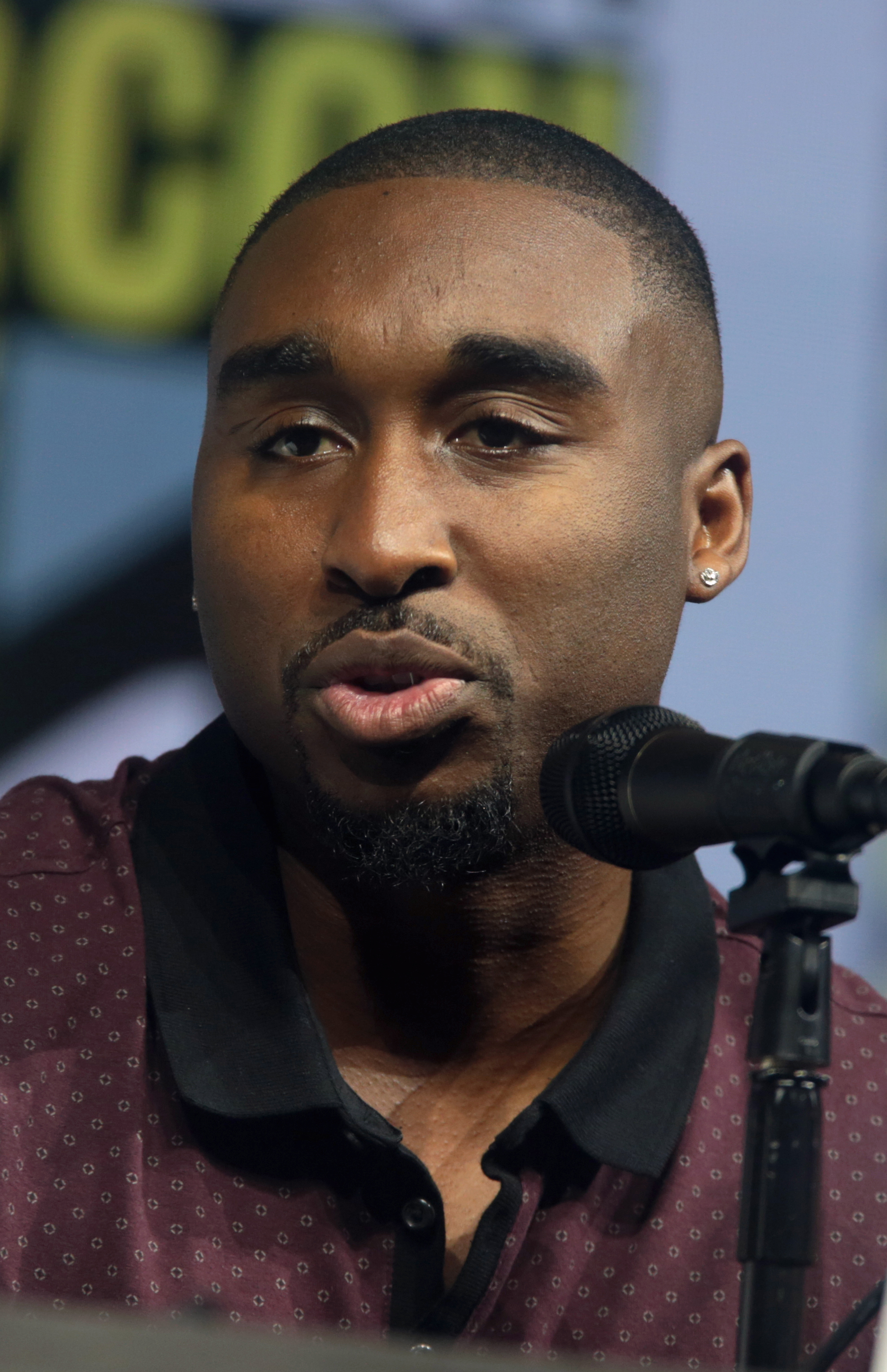
Demetrius Shipp Jr.
portrayed Tupac Shakur
- Demetrius Shipp Jr. as Tupac Shakur
- Danai Gurira as Afeni Shakur, Tupac's mother, a political activist and member of the Black Panther Party.
- Lauren Cohan as Leila Steinberg, Tupac's mentor.
- Jamie Hector as Mutulu Shakur, Tupac's stepfather.
- Annie Ilonzeh as Kidada Jones, girlfriend to Tupac at the time of his death.
- Jamal Woolard as The Notorious B.I.G., Tupac's friend turned rival.
- Kat Graham as Jada Pinkett, a friend of Tupac from the Baltimore School for the Arts.
- Dominic L. Santana as Suge Knight, the founder and CEO of Death Row Records.
- Chris "Young Hump" Clarke as Shock G, the lead vocalist for the hip hop group Digital Underground.
- Money-B as Himself, member of Digital Underground.
- Clifton Powell as Floyd, inmate at Clinton Correctional Facility.
- Keith Robinson as Atron Gregory, TNT Records founder.
- E.D.I. Mean as Himself
- Young Noble as Himself
- Ernest James Hatter III as Yaki Kadafi
- Hill Harper as Journalist
- Cory Hardrict as Nigel (based on Jacques "Hatian Jack" Agnant)
- Erica Pinkett as Briana (based on Ayanna Jackson)
- Jarrett Ellis as Snoop Dogg
- Harold Moore as Dr. Dre
- Azad Arnaud as Daz Dillinger
- Grace Gibson as Faith Evans
- Jermel Howard as Mopreme Shakur
- Deshawn Wayne as Frank Alexander
- Maino as "Shooter"
- DeSean Jackson as Street Entrepreneur
- Rayan Lawrence as Treach
- Phil Armijo as Johnny "J"
- Robyn Young as Madonna
- Lian Amado as Angie Martinez
- Dior Allen as Orlando Anderson

== Production ==
=== Development ===
On February 10, 2011, it was announced that Morgan Creek Productions was developing, and would finance and produce, Tupac, a biographical film about rap legend Tupac Shakur, which would follow his entire life, from growing up in East Harlem to becoming a legendary songwriter and hip-hop artist, to his death in Las Vegas at the age of 25. Antoine Fuqua was attached as the director of the film, and the script was written by Steven Bagatourian, Stephen J. Rivele, and Christopher Wilkinson.

James G. Robinson and David C. Robinson were set to produce the film, along with Program Pictures' L.T. Hutton, and Tupac's mother Afeni Shakur was set as executive producer, with production initially scheduled to begin that summer. On September 19, 2013, Emmett/Furla/Oasis Films came on board to co-finance and co-produce the $45 million-budgeted film, along with Morgan Creek.

On February 12, 2014, John Singleton signed on to rewrite, direct and produce the film, and on April 16, 2014, Open Road Films acquired the United States distribution rights. Ed Gonzalez, Jeremy Haft, and Singleton wrote the then-latest draft of the script. On April 7, 2015, it was revealed that Singleton had exited the film due to major creative differences, while Carl Franklin was being eyed to direct instead.

On October 28, 2015, The Hollywood Reporter reported that Emmett/Furla/Oasis had sued Morgan Creek over $10 million for breaking the companies' co-production agreement, signed in September 2013. In the agreement, terms included not raising the production budget above $30 million, mutual approval for the lead actor's selection, a filming schedule, and agreements on distribution and sales. Randall Emmett and George Furla also stated that they had all first signed a distribution deal with Open Road, which Morgan Creek rejected, and that Morgan Creek had inked a new deal with Open Road without mutual approval.

=== Casting ===
On November 30, 2015, it was reported that music director Benny Boom would direct the film, replacing Franklin. In early December 2015, the film's title was confirmed to be All Eyez On Me. Winsome Sinclair was one of the casting directors for the film. Newcomer Demetrius Shipp, Jr. was set to play Tupac. Jamal Woolard joined the film to play The Notorious B.I.G., Tupac's friend turned rival, reprising his starring role in the 2009 film Notorious. On January 11, 2016, Danai Gurira was added to the film's cast to play Tupac's mother Afeni Shakur, a political activist and member of the Black Panther Party. Variety reported the next day that Kat Graham had signed on to play Jada Pinkett, a friend of Tupac from the Baltimore School for the Arts. It was later revealed that Dominic L. Santana had been cast as record producer Suge Knight.

On January 13, Jamie Hector signed on to play Mutulu Shakur, Tupac's stepfather. On January 15, Lauren Cohan joined the cast to play Leila Steinberg, a key figure in Tupac's life, as his mentor. Money B appeared in the film as himself, Tupac's coworker at Digital Underground, while Clifton Powell was cast as Floyd, an inmate at the Clinton Correctional Facility, and Johnell Young as Tupac's close friend Ray Luv. On January 19, TheWrap reported that Grace Gibson had been cast to play Biggie Smalls' wife, Faith Evans, and on January 22, 2016, Keith Robinson was cast as Atron Gregory, a TNT Records founder, who first helped Tupac become a dancer and a solo artist. Annie Ilonzeh was added to the cast in February 2016 to play Kidada Jones, who was engaged to Tupac at the time of his death.

=== Filming ===
Principal photography on the film began in mid-December 2015 in Atlanta, Georgia. Filming wrapped on April 12, 2016, in Las Vegas, Nevada.

== Marketing ==
On June 16, 2016, on what would have been Shakur's 45th birthday, a teaser trailer for the film was released, and a second trailer premiered on September 13, 2016, the 20th anniversary of Shakur's death. The film's release date was set as June 16, 2017. On January 17, 2017, Lionsgate Films' Summit Entertainment acquired the U.S. distribution rights that was previously held by Open Road.

No official soundtrack album was released to accompany the film.

== Reception ==
=== Box office ===
All Eyez on Me grossed $44.9 million in the United States and Canada, and $10.7 million in other territories, for a worldwide total of $55.7 million, against a production budget of $40 million.

In North America, All Eyez on Me was released on June 16, 2017, alongside Rough Night, 47 Meters Down and Cars 3, and was projected to gross $17–20 million from 2,471 theatres in its opening weekend. It took in $12.8 million on Friday (including $3.1 million from Thursday night previews), increasing weekend estimates to $31 million. It ended up debuting to $26.4 million, finishing 3rd at the box office, behind Cars 3 ($53.7 million) and Wonder Woman ($41.3 million). Deadline Hollywood attributed the film's success to the release corresponding with Tupac's birthday, as well as to audience interest in the subject matter, following the success of rap biopic Straight Outta Compton in 2015; 47% of the opening weekend audience was black, 25% Hispanic, and 19% white.

In its second weekend, the film declined 78% to $5.8 million, the 16th largest such decline on record. In its third weekend, the film, which had dropped down to 1,258 theatres, declined another 68.6% to $1.8 million, finishing 11th at the box office. This was most likely due to the dismal reviews it received upon release.

=== Critical response ===
On review aggregator Rotten Tomatoes, the film has an approval rating of 17% based on 92 reviews, with an average rating of 4.3/10. The website's critical consensus reads, "Despite Demetrius Shipp Jr.'s fine lead performance, All Eyez on Me is mostly a surface-skimming, by-the-numbers biopic of a larger-than-life icon." On Metacritic, which assigns a normalized rating, the film has a weighted average score of 38 out of 100, based on 22 critics, indicating "generally unfavorable" reviews. Audiences polled by CinemaScore gave the film an average grade of "A−" on an A+ to F scale, and PostTrak reported filmgoers gave it an 82% overall positive score.

Glenn Kenny of The New York Times gave the film a negative review, saying: "Almost all the dialogue is that flat-footed. It's a stark contrast to the almost always vivid power of Shakur's own words, which could be profoundly empathetic and pettily profane." Owen Gleiberman of Variety wrote: "Comprehensive but sketchy, richly atmospheric but often under-dramatized, it is not, in the end, a very good movie (there are a few scenes, like Tupac's initial meeting with Ted Field of Interscope Records, that are embarrassingly bad). Yet it's highly worth seeing because in its volatility and hunger, and the desperation of its violence, it captures something about the space in which Tupac Shakur lived: a place that wanted to be all about pride and power, but was really about flying over the abyss."

=== Historical accuracy ===
Jada Pinkett Smith stated that the film contained inaccuracies about her relationship with Shakur, and why he left for California. Smith specified that Tupac never read the poem he read to her character in the film, and that she had no knowledge that it even existed until it was published in his book. She also stated that she never attended one of Shakur's shows at his request, and that there was no backstage argument. However, she praised the performances of Shipp and Graham. Ayanna Jackson, the woman who had accused Shakur of sexual assault, described her portrayal in the movie as, "absolutely ludicrous … nothing about it is me at all," and that the film's depiction of the situation between her and Shakur was "such a falsehood". Jackson stated that she walked out of the movie theater while seeing the film after seeing her portrayal. Both Sean Combs and Suge Knight gave blessings to the film, praising their respective portrayals.

=== Lawsuit ===
In June 2017, shortly after All Eyez on Me was released journalist Kevin Powell filed a copyright infringement lawsuit against the filmmakers. In the complaint Powell alleged that the film was derived from several articles that Powell wrote for Vibe Magazine in the 1990s. While events from Tupac's life are in the public domain, Powell claimed to have "changed or embellished" portions of his articles. One of the claims made by Powell in the lawsuit was that he had invented the character of Nigel.

== See also ==
- Notorious (2009 film)
- Straight Outta Compton (2015 film)
- List of black films of the 2010s
- List of hood films
