= The Rose That Grew from Concrete (poetry collection) =

Book by Tupac Shakur

- Author: Tupac Shakur
- Language: English
- Genre: Poetry
- Publisher: Pocket Books
- Publication date: November 1, 1999
- Publication place: United States
- Pages: 149 (first edition); 176 (2009 reprint)
- ISBN: 978-0-671-02844-2

The Rose That Grew from Concrete (1999) is a collection of poetry written between 1989 and 1991 by Tupac Shakur, published by Pocket Books through its MTV Books imprint. A preface was written by Shakur's mother Afeni Shakur, a foreword by Nikki Giovanni and an introduction by his manager, Leila Steinberg.
