= Ayize Jama-Everett =

American writer

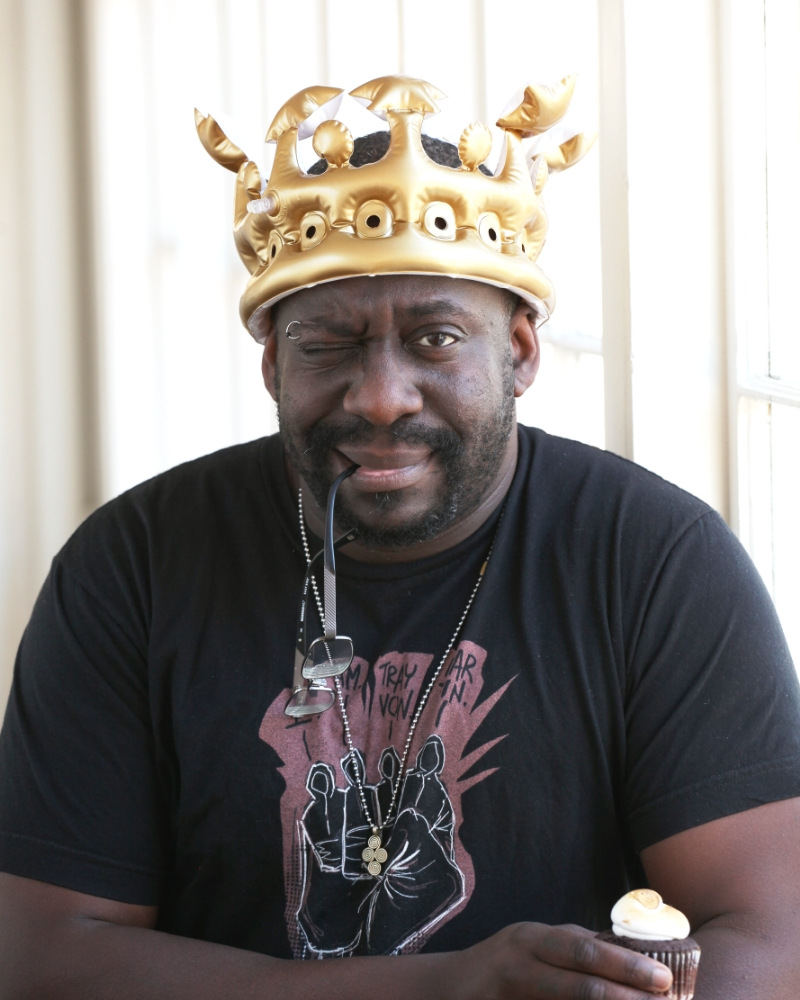
- Born: 1974 (age 51–52); Harlem, New York, U.S.
- Education: M.Div, Starr King School for the Ministry, Graduate Theological Union; M.A., Clinical Psychology, New College of California; MFA, University of California, Riverside
- Occupation: Writer
- Father: Mutulu Shakur
- Relatives: Mopreme Shakur (half-brother); Tupac Shakur (stepbrother); Afeni Shakur (stepmother); Kastro (stepcousin)

Ayize Jama-Everett (born 1974) is an American science fiction and speculative fiction writer. He is the author of the trilogy The Liminal People (self-published, 2009; Small Beer Press, 2012), The Liminal War (Small Beer Press, 2015) and The Entropy of Bones (Small Beer Press, 2015). Since 2015, he has served as a board member of the Tupac Amaru Shakur Foundation (Tupac Shakur being his late stepbrother).

In his review of The Entropy of Bones, the writer Charles Yu describes Jama-Everett's work as "resist[ing] easy categorization. [The protagonist's] mixed racial background offers a potentially nuanced look from a perspective that seems underserved." He goes on to say: "If the book veers among different approaches — now a philosophical kung fu master story, now a seduction into a rarefied subculture, now an esoteric universe made from liner notes and the journal entries of a brilliantly imaginative teenager — there's nevertheless a vitality to the voice and a weirdness that, while not always controlled or intentional, is highly appealing for just that reason." Jama-Everett himself sees his writing as a way to heal people who have long been ignored in mainstream popular culture. He asserts: “There's a big wound in not being seen, in having your reality not being represented in any way.”

In 2021, Jama-Everett, collaborating with writer/illustrator John Jennings, published Box of Bones, an ethno-gothic horror comic. "A genre narrative rooted in collective trauma, with rotating artists. [...] This spirited project is part of the trend of ethno-gothic fiction in the comics market, and offers a landscape ripe to contemplate such spooky and strange fruit."

== Biography ==
Born in Harlem, New York, Jama-Everett is now based in Oakland, California. He has also lived in New Hampshire and Morocco, and traveled extensively across north Africa, Asia and Mexico. He holds master's degrees in clinical psychology and divinity, and has been a teacher at high school and college levels. He is currently a practicing therapist.

According to Jama-Everett, he was named 'Ayize' by his mother, a word that means 'let it come', in an African root language.

Jama-Everett also interviews artists and writers. Some interviews include:

- John Jennings in The Believer Magazine
- Victor LaValle in The Los Angeles Review of Books
- Jody Armour in Racebaitr
