= Billy Garland (activist) =

American member of the Black Panthers

- Born: William Marvin Garland Jr. August 5, 1949 (age 77); New Jersey, United States
- Occupation: Activist
- Political party: Black Panther Party
- Spouse: Married twice
- Partner: Afeni Shakur (1970)
- Children: 6, including Tupac & N'Neka

William Marvin Garland Jr. (born August 5, 1949) is an American former member of the Marxist–Leninist and black power political and militant organization the Black Panther Party (BPP) and the biological father of rapper Tupac Shakur.

== Biography ==
Garland was born in New Jersey, the second oldest of six children to his mother, Eloise Marie Barnes Garland, who died from an illegal abortion when Garland was only six years of age. During his childhood he lived in various cities around New Jersey and in California before settling in Somerville. While attending Somerville High School, he became a star athlete on the school's basketball team. Garland would later enroll in community college but dropped out to join the newly established Jersey City chapter of the Black Panther Party after the assassination of Martin Luther King.

== Role in the Black Panther Party ==
In 1970, Bashir Hameed appointed Garland as the defense captain for the Jersey City chapter of the Black Panther Party. His role was to check-in with other east coast chapters and organize meetings.

== Relationship with Afeni Shakur and Tupac ==
Shortly after moving up the ranks in the BPP, Garland met Afeni Shakur, who was a high-ranking member in the Black Panther Party in New York City. The two dated for a while. Garland later found out Shakur was pregnant with Tupac Shakur, during the Panther 21 trial. Garland learned he was the biological father after Tupac was born in 1971. He remained somewhat involved in Tupac's life until 1976 then lost contact with Afeni. Garland then married and distanced himself from the party.

In 1991, Garland notices Tupac after seeing him on a poster for the movie Juice. Garland reconnected with Tupac until 1994, while Tupac was at Bellevue Hospital following the Quad City shooting. Garland has said he felt concerned Tupac "don't wanna see me" prior to meeting his son. This visit led Garland wanting to be a part of Shakur "and his crew" and visiting Jasmine Guy's apartment together. While Shakur was incarcerated at Clinton Prison in Dannemora, Garland made frequent visits, where they formed a close bond, with Tupac meeting Garland's wife. However, their relationship would build in the time after Tupac was sent to prison. When Tupac was released, the two kept in contact. However, Afeni was skeptical of Garland, saying to People in 1997 that she rarely saw him after Tupac was born, and believed he was "garbage," "a goldigger" and the “designated sperm donor.”

Tupac mentioned Garland in several interviews. In 1995, Shakur stated in an interview conducted by Tabitha Soren for MTV News on Venice Beach that, "recently after I got shot, this other guy came and was like he was my father and he looks like me, he's been to jail to see me. His kids look like me... I just woke up (in hospital) and he was standing over me."

After Tupac was shot on September 7, 1996, Garland flew out the next morning from New Jersey to Las Vegas to be with him. Tupac died on September 13, 1996. Afeni listed Garland as deceased, which left her in charge of Tupac's estate. In 1997, Garland sued Afeni over Tupac's estate, seeking to obtain half of it and noting that her death certificate claim about him being deceased was false. Afeni, who claimed that Garland was an absentee father who contributed little to Tupac's upbringing, then sought a DNA test. This proved Garland was the biological father of Tupac. A Los Angeles judge ruled in December 1997 in favor of Afeni and denied Garland any share of his son's estate, describing Garland's support and care for Tupac over the years as "minuscule."

== Appearances and interviews ==
- In 2002, Garland appeared in the Biggie & Tupac documentary.
- In 2023, Garland was featured in Hulu's Dear Mama docuseries directed by Allen Hughes.
- Garland has also been interviewed on Art of Dialogue and DJ Vlads YouTube channel.

== Personal life ==
Garland is a father to six children. He is the father of Takerra Allen who is the author of the famous "Parachute" book series.

He was also the father of N'Neka Garland, who died in 2023 at the age of 49. N'Neka Garland was the producer of the soap opera General Hospital.
