= Tupac Shakur =

American rapper and actor (1971–1996)

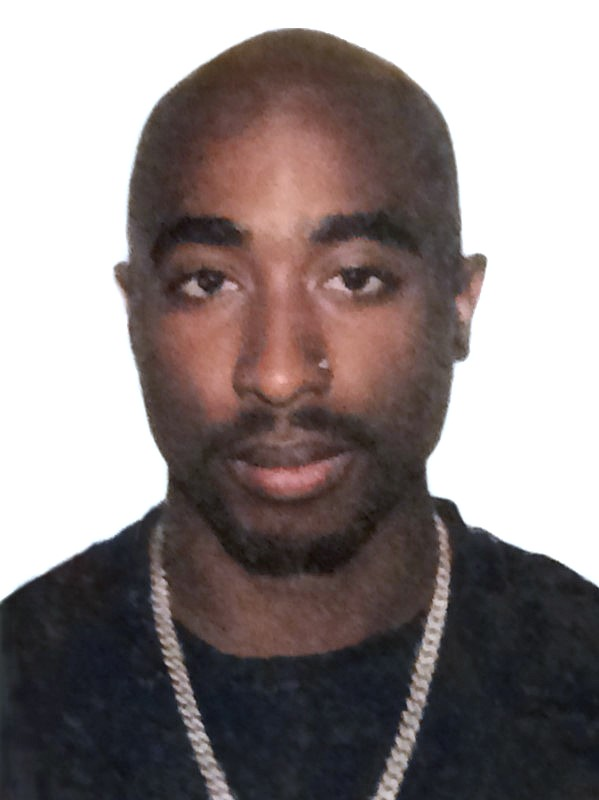
- Shakur in 1995
- Born: Parish Lesane Crooks (Note: Per Tupac Shakur: The Authorized Biography (the only such biography authorized by Tupac's estate), his birth name was "Parish Lesane Crooks". His mother, Afeni Shakur, said of his naming: "I let the gay, lesbian woman [Carol Crooks], who was my friend, name him Parish. Lesane was for my sister's family at the time. And Crooks also, for the Crooks crew. That's right. That's what was on the paper. But Tupac was always his name." His subsequent legal change of name (to "Tupac Amaru Shakur") is corroborated by copies of his original, and amended, birth certificates.) (Note: Shakur's full birth name is often incorrectly given as "Lesane Parish Crooks". Sources affirming his former given name as "Parish" include:.); June 16, 1971; Manhattan, New York City, U.S.
- Died: September 13, 1996 (aged 25); Las Vegas, Nevada, U.S.
- Cause of death: Drive-by shooting (gunshot wounds)
- Other names: 2Pac; Pac; Makaveli; MC New York
- Occupations: Rapper; songwriter; actor; political activist; poet
- Years active: 1989–1996
- Spouse: Keisha Morris (m. 1995; ann. 1996)
- Parents: Afeni Shakur (mother); Billy Garland (father)
- Relatives: Mutulu Shakur (stepfather); Ayize Jama-Everett (stepbrother); Mopreme Shakur (stepbrother); Kastro (cousin); N'Neka Garland (half-sister)
- Awards: Full list
- Musical career
- Genres: West Coast hip-hop; gangsta rap; political hip-hop
- Works: Discography; songs
- Labels: Interscope; Death Row; Makaveli; Atlantic; TNT; Out da Gutta
- Formerly of: Digital Underground; Thug Life; Outlawz; Strictly Dope; Born Busy
- Website: www.2pac.com

Logo

Tupac Amaru Shakur (/ˈtuːpɑːk ʃəˈkʊər/ TOO-pahk shə-KOOR; June 16, 1971 – September 13, 1996), also known by his stage names 2Pac and Makaveli, was an American rapper and actor. He is regarded as one of the most influential musical artists of the 20th century and as a prominent political activist for Black America. His record sales exceed 75 million worldwide. Some of Shakur's music addressed social injustice, political issues, and the marginalization of African Americans, while some of his other songs were gangsta rap.

Shakur was born in New York City to parents who were Black Panther Party members. Raised by his mother, Afeni Shakur, he relocated to the San Francisco Bay Area in 1988. His debut album 2Pacalypse Now (1991) cemented him as a central figure in West Coast hip-hop for his political rap lyrics. Shakur achieved further critical and commercial success with his subsequent albums Strictly 4 My N.I.G.G.A.Z... (1993) and Me Against the World (1995). His Diamond-certified album All Eyez on Me (1996), the first hip-hop double album, abandoned introspective lyrics for volatile gangsta rap. It yielded two Billboard Hot 100-number one singles, "California Love" and "How Do U Want It". Alongside his solo career, Shakur formed the group Thug Life and collaborated with artists like Snoop Dogg, Dr. Dre, and the Outlawz. As an actor, Shakur starred in the films Juice (1992), Poetic Justice (1993), Above the Rim (1994), Bullet (1996), Gridlock'd (1997), and Gang Related (1997).

In November 1994, Shakur was shot five times in the lobby of a New York recording studio and experienced legal troubles, including incarceration. He served eight months in prison on sexual abuse charges, but was released pending appeal in 1995. Following his release, he signed to Marion "Suge" Knight's label Death Row Records and became embroiled in the East Coast–West Coast hip-hop rivalry, which included a high-profile feud with his former friend the Notorious B.I.G. On September 7, 1996, Shakur was murdered by an unidentified assailant in a drive-by shooting in Paradise, Nevada; he died six days later. On August 31, 2026, South Side Compton Crips member Duane "Keffe D" Davis was convicted of orchestrating Shakur's murder, but the shooter (suspected to be Baby Lane) has not been conclusively identified. On October 13, 2026, Davis was sentenced to 40 years to life in prison for Shakur's murder.

Shakur's double-length posthumous album Greatest Hits (1998) is one of his two releases—and one of only nine hip-hop albums—to have been certified Diamond in the United States. Five more albums have been released since Shakur's death, including the acclaimed The Don Killuminati: The 7 Day Theory (1996) under the stage name Makaveli, all of which have been certified multi-platinum in the United States. In 2002, Shakur was inducted into the Hip-Hop Hall of Fame. In 2017, he was inducted into the Rock and Roll Hall of Fame in his first year of eligibility. Rolling Stone ranked Shakur among the 100 Greatest Artists of All Time. In 2023, he was awarded a posthumous star on the Hollywood Walk of Fame. His influence in music, activism, songwriting, and other areas of culture has been the subject of academic studies.

== Early life ==
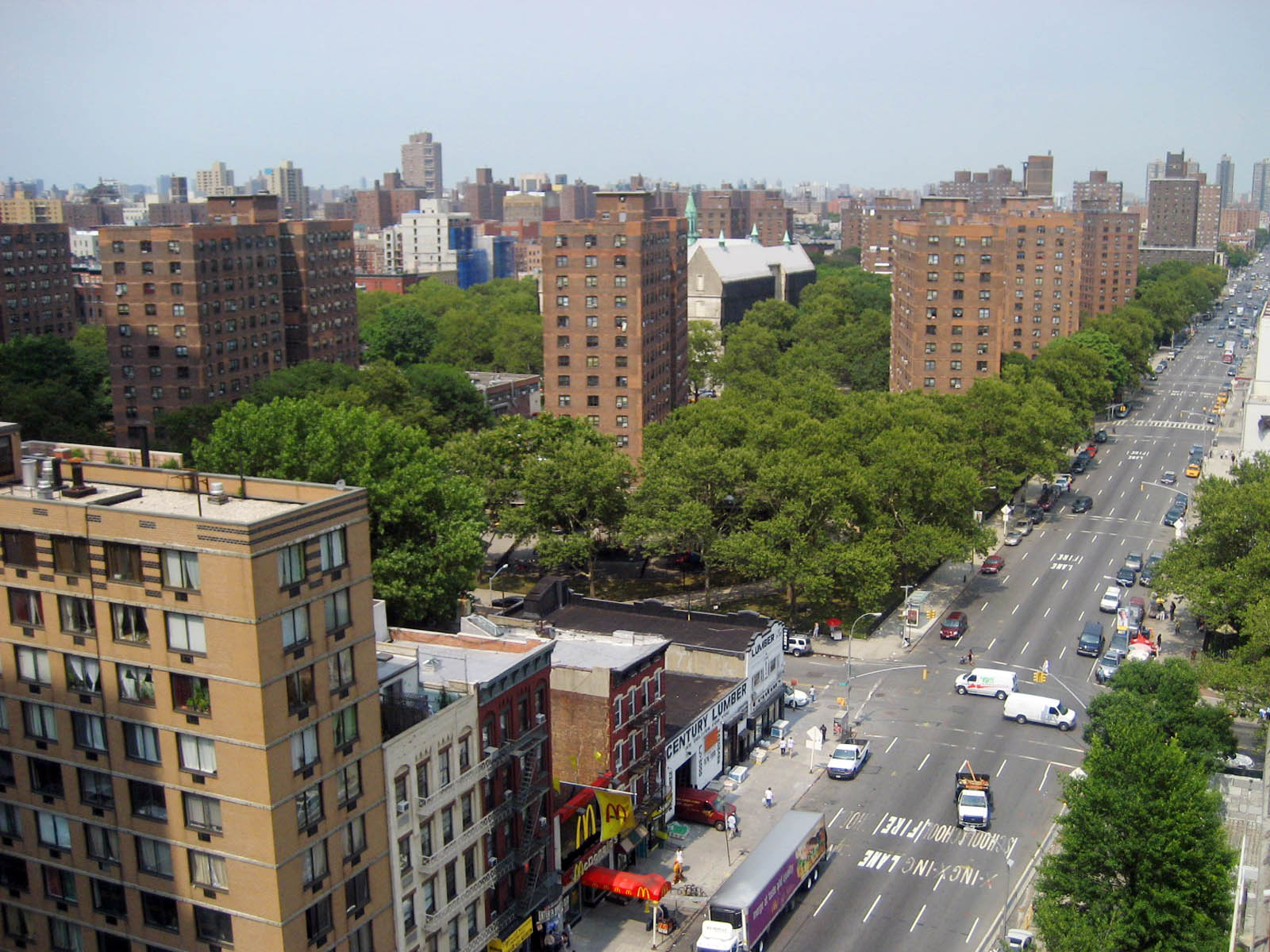
East Harlem, the neighborhood of New York City where Shakur was born

=== Birth and ancestry ===
Tupac Amaru Shakur was born on June 16, 1971, in East Harlem, Manhattan, New York City, to Afeni Shakur (January 10, 1947 – May 2, 2016) and Billy Garland (born March 14, 1949). While his name was listed on his birth certificate (and in public mentions during his infancy) as Parish Lesane Crooks, he was later rechristened in honor of Túpac Amaru II; a descendant of the last Inca ruler, who was executed in Peru in 1781 after his revolt against Spanish rule.

His mother explained, "I wanted him to have the name of revolutionary, indigenous people in the world. I wanted him to know he was part of a world culture and not just from a neighborhood." Tupac's surname came from Lumumba Shakur, whom his mother married in November 1968. Their marriage fell apart when it was discovered that Lumumba was not Tupac's biological father.

Shakur's parents, stepfather Mutulu Shakur, godmother, Assata Shakur and godfather Geronimo Pratt had all been active members of the Black Panther Party in New York in the late 1960s and early 1970s. A month before Shakur's birth, his mother was tried in New York City as part of the Panther 21 criminal trial. She was acquitted of over 150 charges. To not have her son associated with the party, his mother originally listed the surname of her friend, one-time girlfriend, and ex-cellmate Carol Crooks on his birth certificate.

=== 1971–1988: Early life ===
Tupac attended P.S. 028 Wright Brothers elementary school in Harlem, New York around age 12 before moving to Baltimore.

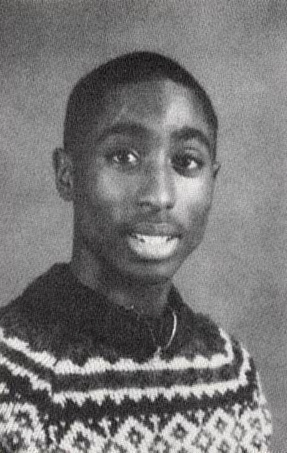
Shakur's Baltimore School for the Arts yearbook photo, 1988

In the 1980s, Shakur's mother found it difficult to find work and struggled with drug addiction. In 1984, his family moved from New York City to Baltimore, Maryland. Beginning in 1984, when Shakur was 13, he lived in the Pen Lucy neighborhood with his mother and younger sister at 3955 Greenmount Ave. The home was a two-story rowhouse that had been subdivided into two separate rental units; the Shakur family lived on the first floor. After his death, the block was renamed Tupac Shakur Way.

While living in Baltimore, Shakur attended eighth grade at Roland Park Middle School, then ninth grade at Paul Laurence Dunbar High School. He transferred to the Baltimore School for the Arts in the tenth grade, where he studied acting, poetry, jazz, and ballet. He performed in Shakespearean plays—the themes of which he identified in patterns of gang warfare—and as the Mouse King in The Nutcracker ballet. At the Baltimore School for the Arts, Shakur befriended actress Jada Pinkett, who became the subject of some of his poems ("Jada" and "The Tears in Cupid's Eyes"). With his friend Dana "Mouse" Smith as a beatbox, he won competitions for the school's best rapper. Known for his humor, he was popular with all crowds of students. He listened to a diverse range of music that included Kate Bush, Culture Club, Sinéad O'Connor, and U2.

Shakur dated Mary Baldridge, who was the daughter of the director of the local chapter of the Communist Party USA. In 1988, Shakur moved to Marin City, California, an impoverished community in the San Francisco Bay Area. In nearby Mill Valley, he attended Tamalpais High School, where he performed in several theater productions. Shakur did not graduate from high school, but later earned his GED.

== Career ==
=== 1988–1991: Early career ===
Shakur began recording under the stage name "MC New York" in 1989. That year, he began attending the poetry classes of Leila Steinberg, and she soon became his manager. Steinberg organized a concert for Shakur and his rap group Strictly Dope. Steinberg managed to get Shakur signed by Atron Gregory, manager of the rap group Digital Underground. In 1990, Gregory placed him with the Underground as a roadie and backup dancer. At the request of Steinberg, Digital Underground co-founder Jimi "Chopmaster J" Dright worked with Shakur, Ray Luv and Dize, a DJ, on their earliest studio recordings. Dright recalls that Shakur did not work well as part of a group, and added, "this guy was on a mission. From day one. Maybe he knew he wasn't going to be around seven years later." From 1988 to 1991, Dright and Digital Underground produced Shakur's earliest work with his crew at the time, Strictly Dope. The recordings were rediscovered in 2000 and released as The Lost Tapes: Circa 1989. Afeni Shakur sued to stop the sale of the recordings but the suit was settled in June 2001 and rereleased as Beginnings: The Lost Tapes 1988–1991.

Shakur debuted under the stage name 2Pac on Digital Underground, under a new record label, Interscope Records, on the group's January 1991 single "Same Song". The song was featured on the soundtrack of the 1991 film Nothing but Trouble, starring Dan Aykroyd, John Candy, Chevy Chase, and Demi Moore. He also appeared with the group in the film, marking Shakur's first film appearance credited as a cameo by the Digital Underground. "Same Song" opened the group's January 1991 EP titled This Is an EP Release, while Shakur appeared in the music video. Shakur's early days with Digital Underground made him acquainted with Randy "Stretch" Walker, who along with his brother, dubbed Majesty, and a friend debuted with an EP as a rap group and production team, Live Squad, in Queens, New York. Stretch was featured on a track of the Digital Underground's 1991 album Sons of the P. Becoming fast friends, Shakur and Stretch recorded and performed together often.

=== 1991–1993: 2Pacalypse Now ===
On November 12, 1991, Shakur released his debut album, 2Pacalypse Now thru Interscope Records. Compared to Digital Underground's works, the album explored contemporary social issues in American society at the time, including racism, police brutality, poverty, gang violence, teenage pregnancy and drug abuse. The album generated controversy when Ronald Ray Howard murdered a Texas Highway Patrol trooper and his defense attorney claimed he was influenced by 2Pacalypse Now and its strong theme of police brutality. U.S. vice president Dan Quayle criticized the album, making the statement, "There's no reason for a record like this to be released. It has no place in our society." Tupac, finding himself misunderstood, explained, in part:

I just wanted to rap about things that affected young black males. When I said that, I didn't know that I was gonna tie myself down to just take all the blunts and hits for all the young black males, to be the media's kicking post for young black males.

Despite controversy, 2Pacalypse Now was certified Gold, and peaked at No. 64 on the Billboard 200 and No. 13 on the Top R&B/Hip-Hop Albums. Three singles were released: "Trapped", "Brenda's Got a Baby" (No. 23 on Hot R&B/Hip-Hop Songs and No. 3 on Hot Rap Songs), and "If My Homie Calls" (No. 3 on Hot Rap Songs). Some prominent rappers—like Nas, Eminem, the Game, and Talib Kweli—cite it as an inspiration. Aside from "If My Homie Calls", the singles "Trapped" and "Brenda's Got a Baby" poetically depict individual struggles under socioeconomic disadvantage.

In 1992, Shakur made his feature film debut in Juice, in which he plays the film's antagonist, Roland Bishop. Rolling Stone's Peter Travers calls him "the film's most magnetic figure". Multiple actors had auditioned for the role. Shakur accompanied Money-B to the audition and asked producer Neal H. Moritz to read. He was given 15 minutes to rehearse before the audition and secured the role.

=== 1993–1994: Strictly 4 My N.I.G.G.A.Z..., film career, and The Notorious B.I.G. ===
Shakur's second album, Strictly 4 My N.I.G.G.A.Z..., was released in February 1993. A critical and commercial success, it debuted at No. 24 on the Billboard 200. Emphasizing Tupac's sociopolitical views, the song "Last Wordz" features Ice Cube and Ice-T. The album's single "I Get Around" is a party anthem featuring Digital Underground's Shock G and Money-B, reached No. 11 on the Billboard Hot 100. The next single, "Keep Ya Head Up", an anthem for women's empowerment, peaked at No. 12 on the Billboard Hot 100. The fourth and final single, "Papa'z Song", peaked at No. 87 on the Billboard Hot 100. The album was certified Platinum in April 1995.

Shakur starred with Janet Jackson in John Singleton's 1993 romance film, Poetic Justice, and portrayed the character, Birdie in the 1994 film, Above the Rim. Director Allen Hughes had originally cast Shakur as the character, Sharif for the 1993 film, Menace II Society, however he was replaced after Shakur assaulted the director on set due to a discrepancy with the script. In 2013, Hughes stated that Shakur would have outshone the other actors "because he was bigger than the movie". Singleton initially cast Shakur in his 1995 film Higher Learning, but was fired because the studio would not finance the film following his arrest. Singleton also stated that he had Shakur in mind in the early stages of what became the 2001 film Baby Boy, Tyrese Gibson ultimately landed the role. The set design includes a Shakur mural in the protagonist's bedroom, and the film's score includes Shakur's song "Hail Mary".

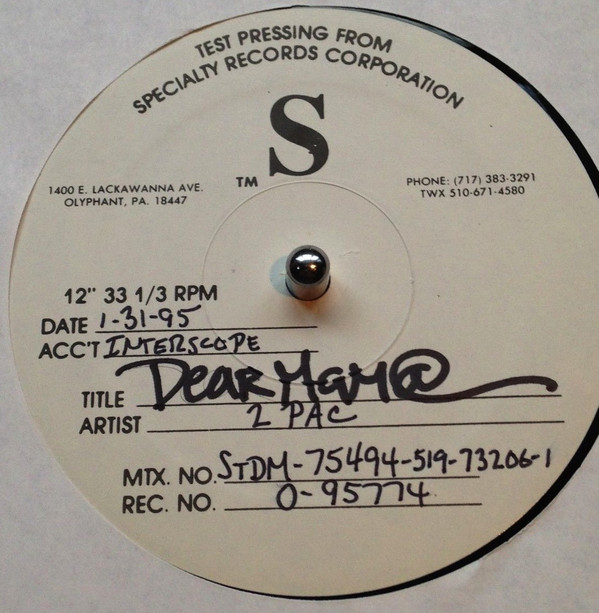
The test pressing single for "Dear Mama"; the Platinum single is among the top-ranked songs in hip-hop history.

In 1993, while visiting Los Angeles, the Notorious B.I.G. asked a local drug dealer to introduce him to Shakur and they quickly became friends. The pair would socialize when Shakur went to New York or B.I.G. to Los Angeles. During this period, at his own live shows, Shakur would call B.I.G. onto stage to rap with him and Stretch. Reportedly, B.I.G. asked Shakur to manage him, whereupon Shakur advised him that Sean Combs would make him a star. Yet in the meantime, Shakur's lifestyle was comparatively lavish to B.I.G. who had not yet established himself. Shakur had a falling out with B.I.G. after Shakur was shot at Quad Studios in 1994.

=== 1995: Me Against the World ===
Shakur's third album, Me Against the World, was released while he was incarcerated in March 1995. It is now hailed as his magnum opus, and commonly ranks among the greatest, most influential rap albums. The album debuted at No. 1 on the Billboard 200 and sold 240,000 copies in its first week, setting a then record for highest first-week sales for a solo male rapper.

The lead single, "Dear Mama", was released in February 1995 with "Old School" as the B-side. It is the album's most successful single, topping the Hot Rap Singles chart, and peaking at No. 9 on the Billboard Hot 100. In July, it was certified Platinum. It ranked No. 51 on the year-end charts. The second single, "So Many Tears", was released in June 1995, reaching No. 6 on the Hot Rap Singles chart and No. 44 on Hot 100. The final single, "Temptations", was released in August 1995. It reached No. 68 on the Hot 100, No. 35 on the Hot R&B/Hip-Hop Singles & Tracks, and No. 13 on the Hot Rap Singles. Several celebrities showed their support for Shakur by appearing in the music video for "Temptations".

Shakur won best rap album at the 1996 Soul Train Music Awards. In 2001, it ranked 4th among his total albums in sales, with about 3 million copies sold in the U.S.

=== 1995–1996: All Eyez on Me and Tha Don Killuminati: The 7 Day Theory ===
While Shakur was imprisoned in 1995, his mother was about to lose her house. Shakur had his wife Keisha Morris contact Death Row Records founder Suge Knight in Los Angeles. Reportedly, Shakur's mother promptly received $15,000. After an August visit to Clinton Correctional Facility in northern New York state, Knight traveled southward to New York City to attend the 2nd Annual Source Awards ceremony. Meanwhile, an East Coast–West Coast hip-hop rivalry was brewing between Death Row and Bad Boy Records. In October 1995, Knight visited Shakur in prison again and posted $1.4 million bond. Shakur returned to Los Angeles and joined Death Row with the appeal of his December 1994 conviction pending.

Shakur's fourth album, All Eyez on Me, arrived on February 13, 1996. It was rap's first double album—meeting two of the three albums due in Shakur's contract with Death Row—and bore five singles. The album shows Shakur rapping about the gangsta lifestyle, leaving behind his previous political messages. With standout production, the album has more party tracks and often a triumphant tone. Music journalist Kevin Powell noted that Shakur, once released from prison, became more aggressive, and "seemed like a completely transformed person".

As Shakur's second album to hit No. 1 on both the Top R&B/Hip-Hop Albums chart and the pop albums chart, the Billboard 200, it sold 566,000 copies in its first week and was certified 5× Multi-Platinum in April. The singles "How Do U Want It" and "California Love" reached No. 1 on the Billboard Hot 100. Death Row released Shakur's diss track "Hit 'Em Up" as the non-album B-side to "How Do U Want It". In this venomous tirade, the proclaimed "Bad Boy killer" threatens violent payback on all things Bad Boy — B.I.G., Sean Combs, Junior M.A.F.I.A., the company — and on any in the East Coast rap scene, like rap duo Mobb Deep and rapper Chino XL, who allegedly had commented against Shakur about the dispute. Posthumously, All Eyez on Me won R&B/Soul or Rap Album of the Year at the 1997 Soul Train Music Awards, Favorite Rap/Hip-Hop Artist at the 1997 American Music Awards, and the album was certified 9× Multi-Platinum in June 1998, and 10× in July 2014.

At the time of his death, a fifth solo album was already finished, The Don Killuminati: The 7 Day Theory, under the stage name Makaveli. It had been recorded during the summer of 1996 and released that year. The lyrics were written and recorded in three days, and mixing took another four days. In 2005, MTV.com ranked The 7 Day Theory at No. 9 among hip-hop's greatest albums ever, and by 2006 a classic album. Its singular poignance, through hurt and rage, contemplation and vendetta, resonates with many fans. According to George "Papa G" Pryce, Death Row Records' then director of public relations, the album was meant to be "underground", and was not intended for release before the artist was murdered. It peaked at No. 1 on Billboard's Top R&B/Hip-Hop Albums chart and on the Billboard 200, with the second-highest debut-week sales total of any album that year. On June 15, 1999, it was certified 4× Multi-Platinum.

Soon after Shakur's death, three more films starring him were released, Bullet (1996), Gridlock'd (1997), and Gang Related (1997).

=== Posthumous albums ===
Later posthumous albums are archival productions, these albums are:

- R U Still Down? (1997)
- Greatest Hits (1998)
- Still I Rise (1999)
- Until the End of Time (2001)
- Better Dayz (2002)
- Loyal to the Game (2004)
- Pac's Life (2006)

== Personal life ==
Jada Pinkett reported that Tupac Shakur developed alopecia sometime around 1991.

In 1993, during a police raid of Shakur's room at the Parker Meridian Hotel in New York City, authorities confiscated a videotape showing Shakur with his then-girlfriend, Desiree Smith. Investigators were attempting to use the tape in their case concerning allegations made by Ayanna Jackson. In 2022, Smith stated that she had neither been underage nor intoxicated at the time of the encounter. In 2011, another video featuring Shakur receiving oral sex while rapping along to an unreleased song was reportedly sold to a private collector. The recording, filmed in 1993, also included Money B of Digital Underground.

=== Family and relationships ===
Tupac had a younger maternal half-sister, Sekyiwa "Set" Shakur, and five paternal half-siblings: Landon, Carlos (Malik), William "Billy" III, N'Neka Garland (1973–2023), and Takerra Allen-Taylor. He also had five stepsiblings from his mother's marriage to Mutulu Shakur (who was Tupac's stepfather and Sekyiwa's father), namely: Chinua, Talib "Tyrone", and Maurice "Mopreme" Shakur, Nzingha Shakur-Ali, and Ayize Jama-Everett. Tupac had no full siblings.

On April 29, 1995, Shakur married his girlfriend Keisha Morris, then a pre-law student, while he was incarcerated. The marriage was annulled ten months later.

While attending the Baltimore School for the Arts, Shakur formed a close friendship with Jada Pinkett. Shakur later helped Pinkett secure her first film role in Menace II Society (1993), while Pinkett helped him obtain a guest-starring role on the sitcom A Different World the same year. Pinkett appeared in Shakur's music videos for "Keep Ya Head Up" and "Temptations". She also conceived the concept for his "California Love" music video and was originally set to direct it before withdrawing from the project. In 1995, Jada Pinkett contributed $100,000 toward Shakur's bail while he awaited an appeal of his sexual abuse conviction. She later revealed that she declined a marriage proposal from Shakur while he was incarcerated at Rikers Island that same year. Reflecting on their relationship, Shakur said, "Jada is my heart. She will be my friend for my whole life. We'll be old together. Jada can ask me to do anything and she can have it." Pinkett similarly described Shakur as "one of my best friends" and said, "He was like a brother. It was beyond friendship for us. The type of relationship we had, you only get that once in a lifetime."

In an interview with The Source, Shakur criticized record producer Quincy Jones for his interracial marriages. His daughter Rashida Jones responded in an irate open letter to the magazine. Shakur later apologized to her sister Kidada Jones, whom he began dating in 1996. The couple attended Men's Fashion Week in Milan and walked together for a Romeo Gigli runway show. Jones was at the Las Vegas hotel where Shakur was staying when he was fatally shot in September 1996.

=== Friendships ===
Shakur befriended Treach when they were both roadies on Public Enemy's tour in 1990. He made a cameo in Naughty by Nature's music video "Uptown Anthem" in 1992. Treach collaborated on Shakur's song "5 Deadly Venomz" and appeared in the music video for Shakur's "Temptations". Treach was also a speaker at a public memorial service for Shakur in 1996.

After Tupac Shakur was shot in 1994, he recuperated at the home of actress Jasmine Guy. The two had met following Shakur's guest appearance on the sitcom A Different World in 1993. Guy later appeared in his music video for "Temptations" and went on to write his mother's 2004 memoir, Afeni Shakur: Evolution of a Revolutionary. In a 1995 interview with Vibe, Shakur named Pinkett, Guy, Treach, Madonna, and Mickey Rourke among those who supported him during his incarceration. He also described Madonna as a supportive friend; Madonna later revealed that the two had dated in 1994. Shakur and Rourke developed a close friendship while filming the movie Bullet in 1994, with Rourke later recalling that Shakur "was there for me during some very hard times."

Shakur also maintained friendships with other celebrities, including Mike Tyson Chuck D, Jim Carrey, and Alanis Morissette. In April 1996, Shakur stated that he, Morissette, Snoop Dogg, and Suge Knight planned to open a restaurant together.

== Legal issues ==
=== 1993 shooting in Atlanta ===
On October 31, 1993, Shakur was arrested in Atlanta for shooting two off-duty police officers, brothers Mark Whitwell and Scott Whitwell. The Atlanta police claimed the shooting occurred after the brothers were almost struck by a car carrying Shakur while they were crossing the street with their wives. As they argued with the driver, Shakur's car pulled up and he shot the Whitwells in the buttocks and the abdomen. However, there are conflicting accounts that the Whitwells were harassing a black motorist and uttered racial slurs. According to some witnesses, Shakur and his entourage had fired in self-defense as Mark Whitwell shot at them first.

Shakur was charged with two counts of aggravated assault. Mark Whitwell was charged with firing at Shakur's car and later with making false statements to investigators. Scott Whitwell admitted to possessing a gun he had taken from a Henry County police evidence room. Prosecutors ultimately dropped all charges against both parties. Mark Whitwell resigned from the force seven months after the shooting. Both brothers filed civil suits against Shakur; Mark Whitwell's suit was settled out of court, while Scott Whitwell's $2 million lawsuit resulted in a default judgment entered against the rapper's estate in 1998.

=== Sexual assault case, prison sentence, appeal and release ===
In November 1993, Shakur and two other men were charged in New York with sodomizing a woman in Shakur's hotel room. The woman, Ayanna Jackson, alleged that after she performed oral sex on Shakur at the public dance floor of a Manhattan nightclub, she went to his hotel room on a later day, when Shakur, record executive Jacques "Haitian Jack" Agnant, Shakur's road manager Charles Fuller and an unidentified fourth man apprehended and forced her to perform non-consensual oral sex on each of them. Shakur was also charged with illegal possession of a firearm as two guns were found in the hotel room. Interviewed on The Arsenio Hall Show, Shakur said he was hurt that "a woman would accuse me of taking something from her", as he had been raised in a female household and surrounded by women his whole life.

On December 1, 1994, Shakur was acquitted of three counts of sodomy and the associated gun charges, but convicted of two counts of first-degree sexual abuse for "forcibly touching the woman's buttocks" in his hotel room. Jurors have said the lack of evidence stymied a sodomy conviction. Shakur's lawyer characterized the sentence as "out of line" with the groping conviction and the setting of bail at $3 million as "inhumane". Shakur's accuser later filed a civil suit against Shakur seeking $10 million for punitive damages which was subsequently settled.

After Shakur had been convicted of sexual abuse, Jacques Agnant's case was separated and closed via misdemeanor plea without incarceration. A. J. Benza reported in New York Daily News Shakur's new disdain for Agnant who Shakur theorized had set him up with the case. Shakur reportedly believed his accuser was connected to and had sexual relations with Agnant and James "Henchman" Rosemond, whom he considered to be behind the 1994 Quad Studios shooting.

Shakur was unable to post the $3 million bond to keep himself free until sentencing so he surrendered himself to authorities at the Bellevue Hospital Jail Ward in New York City on December 23, 1994. At the time, he was still recovering from injuries he received on November 30, when he was shot five times and robbed at Quad Studios. In January 1995, Shakur was moved to the North Infirmary Command (NIC) on Rikers Island in the Bronx. On February 7, 1995, he was sentenced to 18 months to 4 1/2 years in prison by a judge who decried "an act of brutal violence against a helpless woman".

In March 1995, Shakur was transferred to Clinton Correctional Facility in Dannemora. While imprisoned, he began reading again, which he had been unable to do as his career progressed due to his marijuana and alcohol habits. Works such as The Prince by Italian philosopher Niccolò Machiavelli and The Art of War by Chinese military strategist Sun Tzu sparked Shakur's interest in philosophy, philosophy of war and military strategy. On April 29, 1995, Shakur married his girlfriend Keisha Morris; the marriage was later annulled. While in prison, Shakur exchanged letters with celebrities such as Jim Carrey and Tony Danza among others. He was also visited by Al Sharpton, who helped Shakur get released from solitary confinement.

By October 1995, pending judicial appeal, Shakur was incarcerated in New York. On October 12, he bonded out of the maximum security Dannemora Clinton Correctional Facility in the process of appealing his conviction, once Suge Knight, CEO of Death Row Records, arranged for the posting of his $1.4 million bond.

=== 1994 Quad Studios shooting ===
On November 30, 1994, while in New York recording verses for a mixtape of Ron G, Shakur was repeatedly distracted by his beeper. Music manager James "Jimmy Henchman" Rosemond reportedly offered Shakur $7,000 to stop by Quad Studios, in Times Square, that night to record a verse for his client Little Shawn. Shakur was unsure, but agreed to the session as he needed the cash to offset legal costs. He arrived with Stretch and one or two others. In the lobby, three men robbed and beat him at gunpoint; Shakur resisted and was pistol-whipped and shot five times. Shakur speculated that the shooting had been a set-up.

Against medical advice, Shakur checked out of Metropolitan Hospital Center a few hours after surgery and secretly went to the house of the actress Jasmine Guy to recuperate. The next day, Shakur arrived at a Manhattan courthouse bandaged in a wheelchair to receive the jury's verdict for his sexual abuse case. Shakur spent the next few weeks being cared for by his mother and a private doctor at Guy's home. The Fruit of Islam and former members of the Black Panther Party stood guard to protect him.

=== Setup accusations involving the Notorious B.I.G. ===
In a 1995 interview with Vibe, Shakur accused Sean Combs, Jimmy Henchman, and the Notorious B.I.G. – who were at Quad Studios at the time – among others, of setting up or being privy to the November 1994 robbery and shooting. The accusations were significant to the East Coast–West Coast hip-hop rivalry; in 1995, months after the robbery, Combs and B.I.G. released the track "Who Shot Ya?", which Shakur took as a mockery of his shooting and thought they could be responsible, so he released a diss song, "Hit 'Em Up", in which he targeted B.I.G., Combs, their record label, Junior M.A.F.I.A., and at the end of "Hit 'Em Up", he mentions rivals Mobb Deep and Chino XL.

In March 2008, Chuck Philips, in the Los Angeles Times, reported on the 1994 ambush and shooting. The newspaper later retracted the article since it relied partially on FBI documents later discovered forged, supplied by a man convicted of fraud. In June 2011, convicted murderer Dexter Isaac, incarcerated in Brooklyn, issued a confession that he had been one of the gunmen who had robbed and shot Shakur at Henchman's order.

=== Tupac Records copyright lawsuit ===
Amaru Records, founded by Shakur's mother, announced that they would sue Baby Vox and their agency to stop the use of Shakur's music and trademarks without a license agreement. In response, Baby Vox appealed against the accusation, stating that "the sampling of Shakur's music was done legally after receiving an offer from a company at Bungaroo Music, the mecca of American hip-hop." They further explained that Amaru does not hold all of Shakur copyrights, so there is no legal issue, and that Shakur's copyrights are shared by several labels including Tupac State and Interscope, in addition to Amaru. They also revealed that they released their last album after purchasing the rights to use music, portraits, and video for the Asian region from Death Row and DTTG last November. Ultimately, the incident was concluded as a mere misunderstanding after it was confirmed that they had legally purchased the music.

=== Other criminal or civil cases ===
==== 1991 Oakland Police Department lawsuit ====
On October 17, 1991, two Oakland Police Department officers stopped Shakur for jaywalking at a downtown intersection. According to Shakur, officers Alex Boyovic and Kevin Rogers asked him for his ID and pressed him about his name before choking him, throwing him to the ground and slamming his head on the concrete. Shakur filed a $10 million lawsuit against the officers for police brutality. The case was settled for about $43,000.

==== Misdemeanor assault convictions ====
On April 5, 1993, charged with felonious assault, Shakur allegedly threw a microphone and swung a baseball bat at rapper Chauncey Wynn, of the group M.A.D., at a concert at Michigan State University. Shakur claimed the bat was a part of his show, that he never swung it, and that there was no criminal intent. Nonetheless, on September 14, 1994, Shakur pleaded guilty to a misdemeanor and was sentenced to 30 days in jail, twenty of them suspended on condition that he complete 35 hours of community service.

Slated to star as Sharif in the 1993 Hughes Brothers' film Menace II Society, Shakur was replaced by actor Vonte Sweet after allegedly assaulting one of the film's directors, Allen Hughes. In early 1994, Shakur served 15 days in jail after being found guilty of the assault. The prosecution's evidence included a Yo! MTV Raps interview in which Shakur boasted that he had "beat up the director of Menace II Society".

==== Concealed weapon case ====
In 1994, Shakur was arrested in Los Angeles, when he was stopped by police on suspicion of speeding. Police found a semiautomatic pistol in the car, a felony offense because of a prior conviction in 1993 in Los Angeles for carrying a concealed firearm. On April 4, 1996, Shakur was sentenced to 120 days in jail for violating his release terms and failing to appear for a road cleanup job, but was allowed to remain free awaiting appeal. On June 7, his sentence was deferred via appeals pending in other cases.

==== 1995 wrongful death suit ====
On August 22, 1992, in Marin City, Shakur performed outdoors at a festival. For about an hour after the performance, he signed autographs and posed for photos. A conflict broke out and Shakur allegedly drew a legally carried Colt Mustang but dropped it on the ground. Shakur claimed that someone with him then picked it up when it accidentally discharged.

About 100 yards (90 meters) away in a schoolyard, Qa'id Walker-Teal, a boy aged 6 on his bicycle, was fatally shot in the forehead. Police matched the bullet to a .38-caliber pistol registered to Shakur. His stepbrother Maurice Harding was arrested in suspicion of having fired the gun, but no charges were filed. Lack of witnesses stymied prosecution. In 1995, Qa'id's mother filed a wrongful death suit against Shakur, which was settled for about $300,000 to $500,000.

==== C. Delores Tucker lawsuit ====
In 1997, civil rights activist and fierce rap critic C. Delores Tucker sued Shakur's estate in federal court, claiming that lyrics in "How Do U Want It" and "Wonda Why They Call U Bitch" inflicted emotional distress, were slanderous, and invaded her privacy. The case was later dismissed.

== Murder and aftermath ==
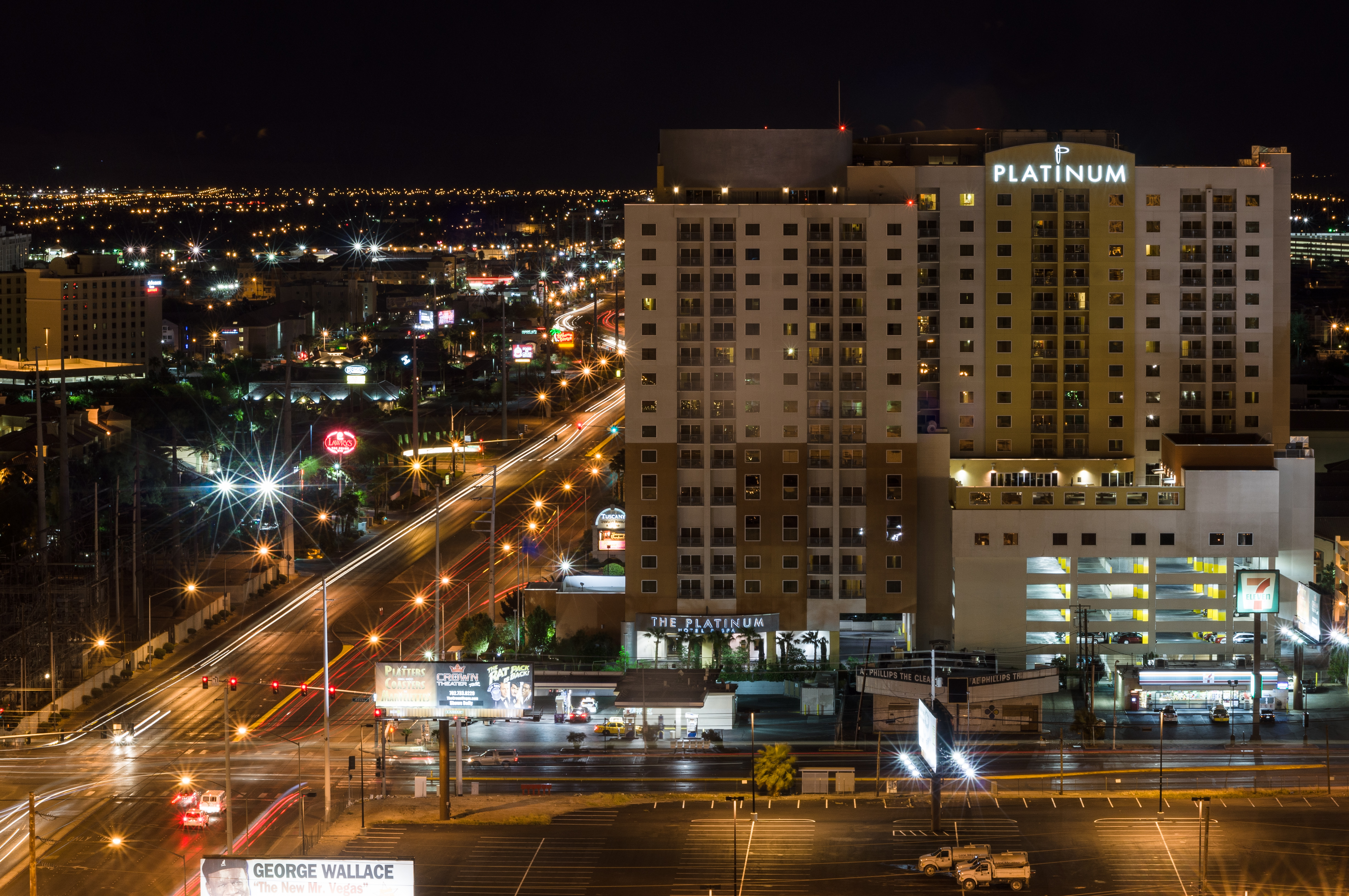
East Flamingo Road and Koval Lane, where the murder occurred

On the night of September 7, 1996, Shakur was in Paradise, Nevada, to attend the Bruce Seldon vs. Mike Tyson boxing match with Suge Knight at the MGM Grand. Afterward in the lobby one of Knight's associates spotted Orlando Anderson, a South Side Compton Crip, and told Shakur he had tried to rob them earlier that year. The hotel's surveillance footage shows the ensuing assault on Anderson. Shakur soon stopped by his hotel room and then headed with Knight to his Death Row nightclub, Club 662, in a black BMW 750iL sedan, part of a larger convoy.

At about 11 p.m. on Las Vegas Boulevard, bicycle-mounted police stopped the car for its loud music and lack of license plates. The plates were found in the trunk, and the car was released without a ticket. At about 11:15 p.m. at a stop light, a white, four-door, late-model Cadillac sedan pulled up to the passenger side and an occupant rapidly fired into the car. Shakur was struck four times: once in the arm, once in the thigh, and twice in the chest with one bullet entering his right lung. Shards hit Knight's head. Frank Alexander, Shakur's bodyguard, was not in the car at the time. He would say he had been tasked to drive the car of Shakur's girlfriend, Kidada Jones.

Shakur was taken to the University Medical Center of Southern Nevada where he was heavily sedated and put on life support. In the intensive-care unit on the afternoon of September 13, 1996, Shakur died from internal bleeding. He was pronounced dead at 4:03 p.m. The official causes of death are respiratory failure and cardiopulmonary arrest associated with multiple gunshot wounds. Shakur's body was cremated the next day. Members of the Outlawz, recalling a line in his song "Black Jesus", (although uncertain of the artist's attempt at a literal meaning chose to interpret the request seriously) smoked some of his body's ashes after mixing them with marijuana.

In 2002, investigative journalist Chuck Philips, after a year of work, reported in the Los Angeles Times that Anderson, a Southside Compton Crip, having been attacked by Suge and Shakur's entourage at the MGM Hotel after the boxing match, had fired the fatal gunshots, but that Las Vegas Metropolitan Police had interviewed him only once, briefly, before his death in an unrelated shooting. Philips's 2002 article also alleges the involvement of Christopher "Notorious B.I.G." Wallace and several within New York City's criminal underworld. Both Anderson and Wallace denied involvement, while Wallace offered a confirmed alibi. Music journalist John Leland, in The New York Times, called the evidence "inconclusive".

In 2011, via the Freedom of Information Act, the FBI released documents related to its investigation which described an extortion scheme by the Jewish Defense League (classified as "a right wing terrorist group" by the FBI) that included making death threats against Shakur and other rappers, but did not indicate a direct connection to his murder.

=== Murder trial ===
On July 18, 2023, the Las Vegas Metropolitan Police Department executed a search warrant in connection with Shakur's murder. On September 29, 2023, the AP reported that Las Vegas Metropolitan Police had arrested a suspect, Duane "Keefe D" Davis, (Note: In his most recent interview with The Hollywood Reporter, Davis said that his name was misspelled as "Keffe D" in his memoir and that the correct spelling is "Keefe D.") in Shakur's murder. Police had two months previously served a search warrant at his wife's home in the Las Vegas suburb of Henderson. Davis pleaded not guilty on November 2, 2023, in Las Vegas. On August 10, 2026, Davis's trial for Shakur's murder began. By this point in time, Davis was incarcerated at Nevada's High Desert State Prison serving a 16 to 40-month prison sentence for a separate jailhouse fight-related conviction he received in April 2025. On August 31, one week shy of the 30th anniversary of the shooting, the jury, after nearly three hours of deliberations, convicted Davis of first-degree murder. Davis was sentenced on October 13, to 40 years to life in prison.

== Artistry ==
=== Musical style ===
Shakur's music and philosophical outlook were deeply influenced by a wide range of American, African American, and global influences, including the Black Panther Party, black nationalism, egalitarianism, and the concept of liberty. Moreover, Shakur's artistic sensibilities were enriched by his passion for theater and admiration for the works of William Shakespeare. Notably, he honed his theatrical skills as a student at the Baltimore School for the Arts, where he delved into the psychological complexities inherent in inter-gang warfare and inter-cultural conflicts, reflecting themes explored in Shakespearean dramas.

2Pacalypse Now (1991), showcased his socially conscious perspective. Through powerful tracks like "Brenda's Got a Baby", "Trapped", and "Part Time Mutha", Shakur addressed social injustice, poverty, and police brutality. In doing so, he contributed to the ongoing success of rap groups such as Boogie Down Productions, Public Enemy, X-Clan, and Grandmaster Flash and the Furious Five, while establishing himself as one of the pioneering socially conscious rappers from the West Coast.

Continuing his focus on the social challenges faced by African American people, Shakur's second album featured songs like "The Streetz R Deathrow" and "Last Wordz". Simultaneously, he showcased his compassionate side with the empowering anthem "Keep Ya Head Up", and his legendary intensity with the title track from the album Strictly 4 My N.I.G.G.A.Z... Additionally, he paid homage to his former group Digital Underground by including them on the playful track "I Get Around". Throughout his career, Shakur's subsequent albums reflected a growing assertiveness in his approach.

Shakur's body of work encompassed contrasting themes, including social inequality, injustice, compassion, playfulness, and hope. These elements continued to shape his artistry, exemplified by his explosive 1995 album Me Against the World. The release of All Eyez on Me in 1996 further solidified his reputation, with tracks like "Ambitionz az a Ridah", "I Ain't Mad at Cha", "California Love", "Life Goes On", and "Picture Me Rollin'" being hailed as classics by critics. Shakur described All Eyez on Me as a celebration of life, and the album achieved both critical acclaim and commercial success. According to Eminem, Tupac is the greatest songwriter of all time. Nas said in 2002: "I put Tupac beyond Shakespeare."

=== Vocal style ===
In the documentary Tupac Shakur: Thug Angel, Greg "Shock G" Jacobs, one of Shakur's early producers, discusses how rappers use different bodily areas to project their voices. According to him, "Slick Rick rhymed from the nasal palate, Nas from the back of his throat, and Pac from the pit of his stomach, which is where his power came from." Shakur's influences stemmed from powerful orators like Martin Luther King Jr. and Malcolm X. Despite not being physically imposing, Shakur's voice carried immense weight and power, reminiscent of these influential speakers.

Shakur was also known for his technique of stacking or layering vocals, adding depth and rawness to his voice. This approach, demonstrated notably on tracks like "Dear Mama" from his 1995 album Me Against the World, involves overlaying multiple vocal lines to highlight rhythms and emphasize words and phrases. Mastering this technique requires precision to maintain flow and clarity, as heard in the lyrics "and even though I act crazy/I gotta thank the Lord that you made me", where Shakur's voice transitions from full to husky, underscoring the emotional depth of the lyrics. Despite its difficulty, Shakur's background in jazz, poetry, and theater endowed him with exceptional rhythm control, enabling him to layer vocals seamlessly while preserving cohesion and flow.

== Poetry and literary influences ==
Before and during his music career, Shakur wrote dozens of poems. According to Rolling Stone writer Andy Greene, Shakur was "a poet and activist who became one of his era's most revolutionary voices." He had a strong passion for theater and greatly admired William Shakespeare. Years after Shakur's death, rapper Nas remarked, "I put Tupac beyond Shakespeare."

In 1993, Shakur portrayed Lucky in the film Poetic Justice alongside Janet Jackson. The poems featured in the film were written by poet and civil rights activist Maya Angelou.

Many of Shakur's best-known poems were later collected in the posthumous poetry book The Rose That Grew from Concrete, released in 1999. The collection includes poems such as "Can U C the Pride in the Panther", "If I Fail", "Family Tree", "The Rose That Grew from Concrete", and "Jada". In 2021, Jada Pinkett Smith commemorated Shakur's 50th birthday by sharing a previously unreleased poem titled "Lost Soulz" on Instagram.

In April 2022, a collection of handwritten poems Shakur wrote at age 11 was offered for sale for US$300,000, but ultimately sold for $90,000. The poems were dedicated to Jamal Joseph and three other members of the Black Panther Party while they were incarcerated at Leavenworth Prison. Even at a young age, Shakur's writing explored themes of Black liberation, mass incarceration, race, and masculinity. The collection also included a self-portrait depicting Shakur asleep with a pen in hand, dreaming of the Panthers being freed from prison, signed with a heart and the phrase "Tupac Shakur, Future Freedom Fighter."

== Legacy and remembrance ==
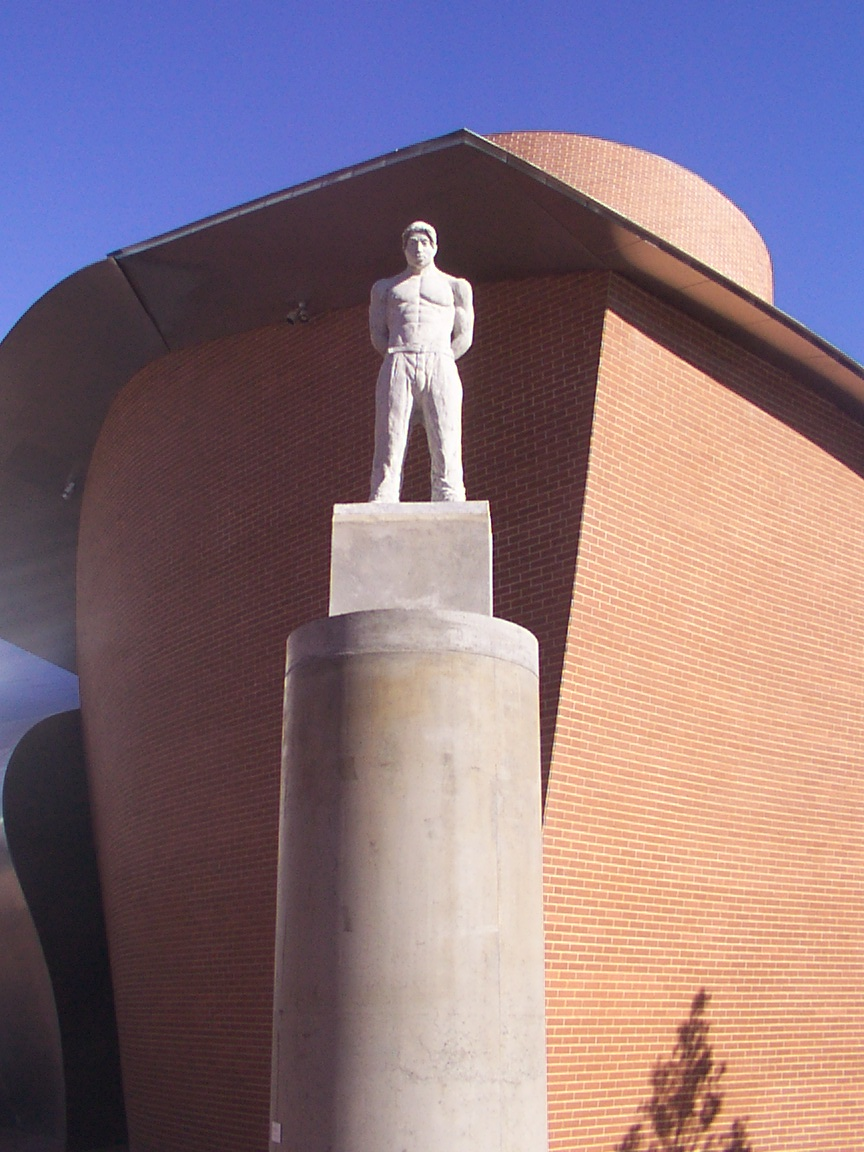
A statue of Shakur at the MARTa museum in Herford, Germany

Shakur is considered one of the greatest and most influential rappers of all time. He was listed as one of the greatest artists of all time by Rolling Stone. He is widely credited as an important figure in hip-hop culture, and his prominence in pop culture in general has been noted. Dotdash, formerly About.com, while ranking him fifth among the greatest rappers, nonetheless notes, "Tupac Shakur is the most influential hip-hop artist of all time. Even in death, 2Pac remains a transcendental rap figure." Yet to some, he was a "father figure" who, said rapper YG, "makes you want to be better—at every level." In 2023, Billboard ranked Tupac at number 4 among the top 50 rappers of all time.

AllMusic's Stephen Thomas Erlewine described Shakur as "the unlikely martyr of gangsta rap", with Shakur paying the ultimate price of a criminal lifestyle. Shakur was described as one of the top two American rappers in the 1990s, along with Snoop Dogg. The online rap magazine AllHipHop held a 2007 roundtable at which New York rappers Cormega, citing tour experience with New York rap duo Mobb Deep, commented that B.I.G. ran New York, but Shakur ran America. Shakur emerged as a celebrated artist, earning recognition for his astonishingly prolific output and unwavering commitment to his craft. According to Rolling Stone writer Andy Green: "He was also a poet and activist who became one of his era's most revolutionary voices."

In 2017, American rapper Snoop Dogg called Tupac "the greatest rapper of all time" during his Rock & Roll Hall of Fame tribute. In 2021, Saweetie told Complex that Tupac was "the greatest rapper that ever lived".

According to British writer Rob Marriott, he deemed the act of tying a bandana into rabbit ears as one of the most distinctive and instantly recognizable style choices in the world of hip-hop. Regarded as a sex symbol, his unique style helped shape the fashion landscape of the 1990s and continues to influence artists and fashion enthusiasts to this day.

In 2010, writing Rolling Stone magazine's entry on Shakur at No. 86 among the "100 greatest artists", New York rapper 50 Cent appraised:

Every rapper who grew up in the Nineties owes something to Tupac. People either try to emulate him in some way, or they go in a different direction because they didn't like what he did. But whatever you think of him, he definitely developed his own style: He didn't sound like anyone who came before him.

According to music journalist Chuck Philips, Shakur "had helped elevate rap from a crude street fad to a complex art form, setting the stage for the current global hip-hop phenomenon." Philips writes, "The slaying silenced one of modern music's most eloquent voices—a ghetto poet whose tales of urban alienation captivated young people of all races and backgrounds." Via numerous fans perceiving him, despite his questionable conduct, as a martyr, "the downsizing of martyrdom cheapens its use", academic Michael Eric Dyson concedes. But Dyson adds, "Some, or even most, of that criticism can be conceded without doing damage to Tupac's martyrdom in the eyes of those disappointed by more traditional martyrs."

In 2014, BET explained that "his confounding mixture of ladies' man, thug, revolutionary and poet has forever altered our perception of what a rapper should look like, sound like and act like. In 50 Cent, Ja Rule, Lil Wayne, newcomers like Freddie Gibbs and even his friend-turned-rival B.I.G., it's easy to see that Pac is the most copied MC of all time. There are murals bearing his likeness in New York, Brazil, Sierra Leone, Bulgaria and countless other places; he even has statues in Atlanta and Germany. Quite simply, no other rapper has captured the world's attention the way Tupac did and still does." More simply, his writings, published after his death, inspired rapper YG to return to school and get his GED. In 2020, former California Senator and former vice-president Kamala Harris called Shakur the "best rapper alive", which she explained as being because "West Coast girls think 2Pac lives on". According to writer Kevin Powell: "He deserves to be put in the same category as Bob Dylan, Bob Marley, as John Lennon, in terms of his global impact." Tupac is regarded as one of the most influential artists in music and popular culture in general and an icon of activism.

Palestinian rapper Tamer Nafar, leader and a founding member of DAM, became passionate about hip-hop by listening to Tupac, saying, "The imagery in Shakur's videos was similar to our reality in Lod."

=== Final ash placement ===
In 2006, on the 10th anniversary of Tupac Shakur's death, his ashes were planned to be moved to Soweto. Shakur's mother Afeni planned to transport them to the "birthplace of his ancestors" and conduct a memorial service. Afeni Shakur explained that Soweto had been selected due to its significance as the "birthplace of the South African struggle for democracy and against apartheid." The City of Johannesburg Metropolitan Municipality donated a five-acre plot of undeveloped land in the Zola area of Soweto to build a memorial honoring Shakur. A portion of the land was designated to be transformed into a park for the benefit of local children as well as aimed at promoting environmental education, pathways, orphanages, bridges, skateboard ramps and a golf range while plans also included the construction of an amphitheater and a museum showcasing South African music and arts. A week before the event, Afeni Shakur postponed the trip and the plan never materialised. The majority of his ashes were buried in his mother's native Lumberton, North Carolina.

=== Tupac Amaru Shakur Foundation ===
In 1997, Shakur's mother founded the Shakur Family Foundation. Later renamed the Tupac Amaru Shakur Foundation, or TASF, it launched with a stated mission to "provide training and support for students who aspire to enhance their creative talents." The TASF sponsors essay contests, charity events, a performing arts day camp for teenagers, and undergraduate scholarships. In June 2005, the TASF opened the Tupac Amaru Shakur Center for the Arts, or TASCA, in Stone Mountain, Georgia. It closed in 2015.

=== Tupac memorial pole in Las Vegas ===
The Tupac memorial pole in Las Vegas is an unofficial memorial at the site where Shakur was murdered. Fans frequently leave messages and writings on the pole to remember him. Some visitors coat the pole with graffiti to show their appreciation for Shakur, and some well-wishers have left offerings at the base of the utility pole. Fans often lay flowers near the pole on his birthday and the day he died. The memorial is located at the intersection of East Flamingo Road and Koval Lane.

=== Academic appraisal ===
In 1997, the University of California, Berkeley, offered a course led by a student titled "History 98: Poetry and History of Tupac Shakur". In April 2003, Harvard University cosponsored the symposium "All Eyez on Me: Tupac Shakur and the Search for the Modern Folk Hero", where Shakur's influence as both an artist and an activist was analyzed. The papers presented cover his ranging influence from entertainment to sociology. Calling him a "Thug Nigga Intellectual", an "organic intellectual", English scholar Mark Anthony Neal assessed his death as leaving a "leadership void amongst hip-hop artists", as this "walking contradiction" helps, Neal explained, "make being an intellectual accessible to ordinary people."

Tracing Shakur's mythical status, Murray Forman discussed him as "O.G.", or "Ostensibly Gone", with fans, using digital mediums, "resurrecting Tupac as an ethereal life force." Music scholar Emmett Price, calling him a "Black folk hero", traced his persona to Black American folklore's tricksters, which, after abolition, evolved into the urban "bad-man". Yet in Shakur's "terrible sense of urgency", Price identified instead a quest to "unify mind, body, and spirit." According to Price, Tupac had surpassed the legacies of John Coltrane and Mahalia Jackson within the tradition of black music.

In 2012, the Norwegian University of Oslo organized the course: "Tupac, hiphop og kulturhistorie (Tupac, hip-hop and cultural history)." As Knut Aukrust, a Norwegian professor and scholar of cultural studies at the University of Oslo, puts it: "Tupac Amaru Shakur (1971–1996) is one of the most famous and controversial representatives of hip-hop culture. He has become an icon with almost saint-like status far beyond his fan base. References to him and his message appear all over the world, from Barack Obama's slogan about "changes," to Palestinians and Israelis longing for peace in the Middle East, to the people of Groruddalen, who want their experiences to be taken seriously. The course highlights how a single person can fit into a wider network of cultural models and how a local storytelling tradition has become an international cultural phenomenon."

Jeffrey Ogbonna Green Ogbar, professor of History and Popular Music at the University of Connecticut, described Shakur as "one of the most iconic and influential music artists of the 20th century", and also a "politically conscious activist voice for Black America."

Graffiti of Tupac Shakur

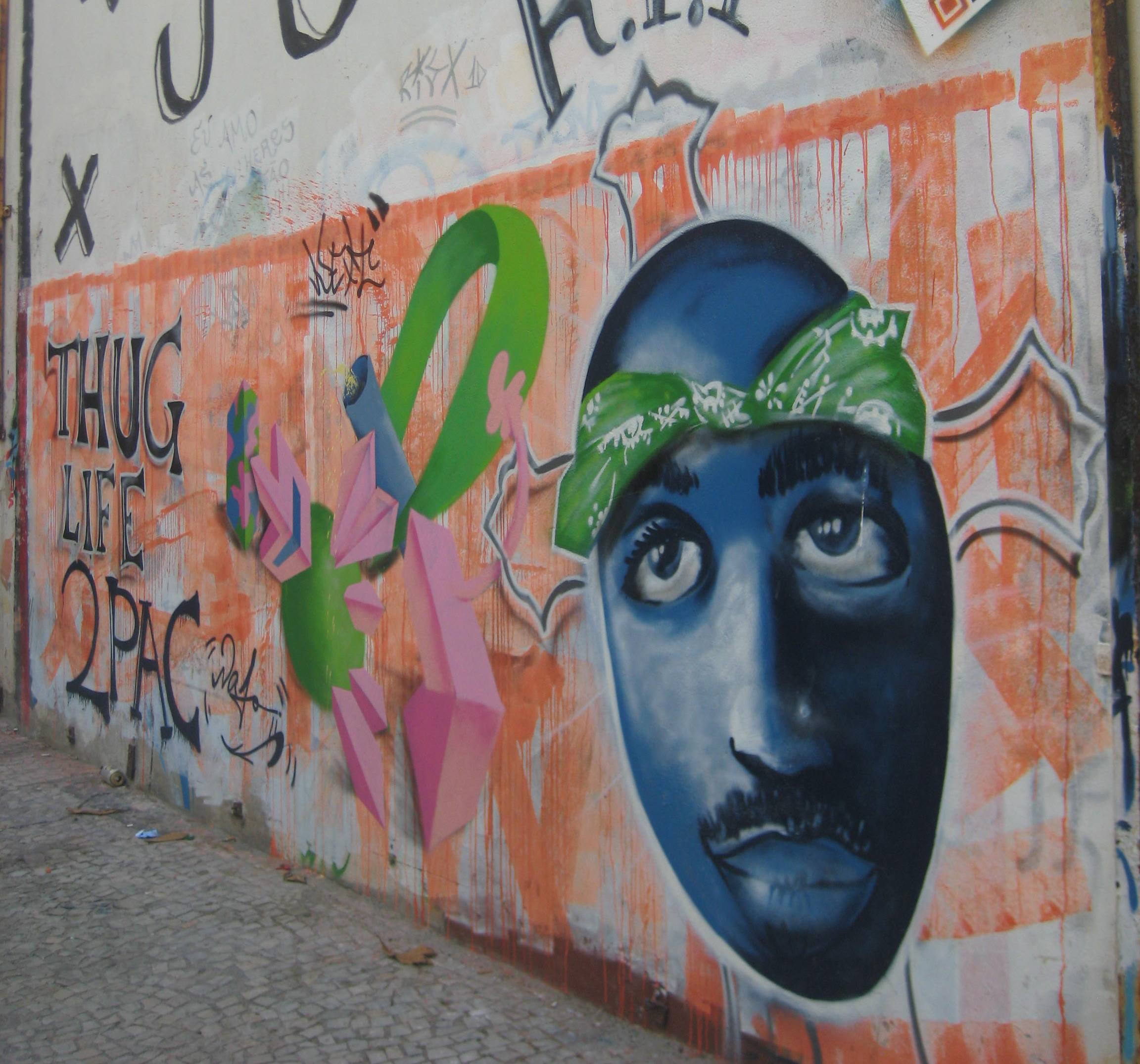
Ipanema, Rio de Janeiro, Brazil

=== Multimedia releases ===
In 2005, Death Row released on DVD, Tupac: Live at the House of Blues, his final recorded live performance, an event on July 4, 1996. In August 2006, Tupac Shakur Legacy, an "interactive biography" by Jamal Joseph, arrived with previously unpublished family photographs, intimate stories, and over 20 detachable copies of his handwritten song lyrics, contracts, scripts, poetry, and other papers. In 2006, the Shakur album Pac's Life was released and, like the previous, was among the recording industry's most popular releases. In 2008, his estate made about $15 million.

On April 15, 2012, at the Coachella Music Festival, rappers Snoop Dogg and Dr. Dre joined a Shakur "hologram" (Although the media referred to the technology as a hologram, technically it was a projection created with the Musion Eyeliner), and, as a partly virtual trio, performed the Shakur songs "Hail Mary" and "2 of Amerikaz Most Wanted". There were talks of a tour, but Dre refused. Meanwhile, the Greatest Hits album, released in 1998, and which in 2000 had left the pop albums chart, the Billboard 200, returned to the chart and reached No. 129, while also other Shakur albums and singles drew sales gains.

=== Books ===
In 1999, Tupac's posthumous book was released called The Rose That Grew from Concrete featuring 72 deeply personal, handwritten poems written when Tupac was 19. The poetry collection is used in schools, ranging from middle school to high school English curricula.

=== Film and stage ===
The documentary film Tupac: Resurrection was released in November 2003. It was nominated for Best Documentary at the 2005 Academy Awards.

In 2014, the play Holler If Ya Hear Me, based on Shakur's lyrics, played on Broadway, but, among Broadway's worst-selling musicals in recent years, ran only six weeks. In development since 2013, a Shakur biopic, All Eyez on Me, began filming in Atlanta in December 2015. It was released on June 16, 2017, on Shakur's 46th birthday, albeit to generally negative reviews.

In August 2019, a docuseries directed by Allen Hughes, Outlaw: The Saga of Afeni and Tupac Shakur, was announced.

=== Video games ===
In June 2026, it was announced that Shakur's likeness will be featured in the video game Stranger Than Heaven (2027), developed by RGG Studio. Shakur's character, Amaru, was developed with supervision from his estate.

=== Awards and honors ===
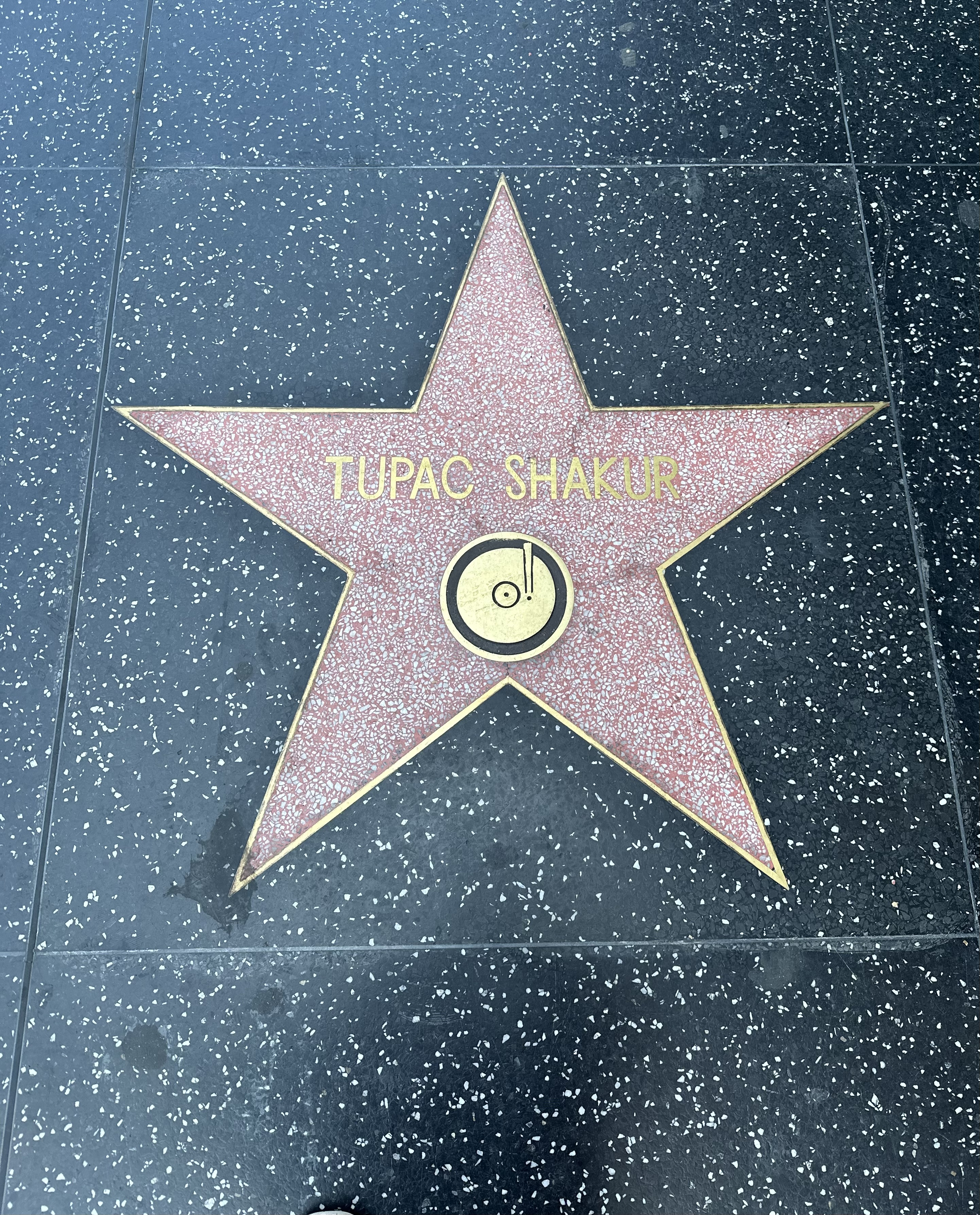
Tupac Shakur's star on the Hollywood Walk of Fame

- In 2002, Shakur was inducted into the Hip-Hop Hall of Fame. In 2004, Shakur was among the honorees at the first Hip Hop Honors.
- In 2006, Shakur's close friend and classmate Jada Pinkett Smith donated $1 million to their high school alma mater, the Baltimore School for the Arts, and named the new theater in his honor. In 2021, Pinkett Smith honored Shakur's 50th birthday by releasing a never before seen poem she had received from him.
- In 2009, drawing praise, the Vatican added "Changes", a 1998 posthumous track, to its online playlist. On June 23, 2010, the Library of Congress added "Dear Mama" to the National Recording Registry, the third rap song.
- In 2015, the Grammy Museum opened an exhibition dedicated to Shakur. In his first year of eligibility, Shakur was inducted into the Rock and Roll Hall of Fame on April 7, 2017.
- In January 2022, the exhibition Tupac Shakur: Wake Me When I'm Free opened at The Canvas at L.A. Live in Los Angeles.

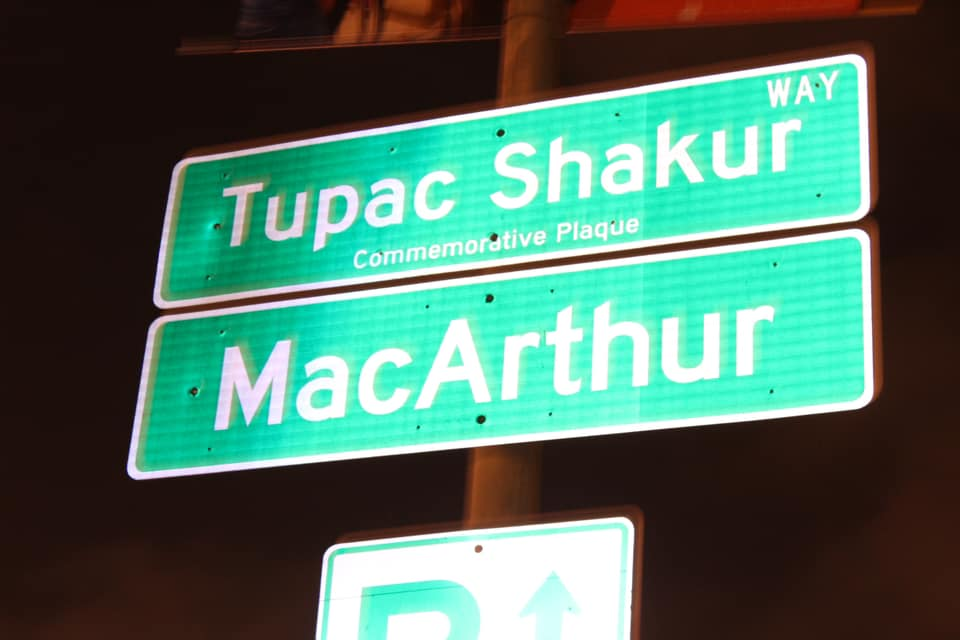
Section of MacArthur Boulevard named Tupac Shakur Way

- On May 16, 2023, Oakland City Council voted to name the section of MacArthur Boulevard between Grand Avenue and Van Buren Avenue "Tupac Shakur Way".
- On June 7, 2023, Shakur received a star on the Hollywood Walk of Fame. His half-sister, Sekyiwa "Set" Shakur, accepted the award in his honor.
- On May 8, 2026, a part of Greenmount Avenue in Pen Lucy, Baltimore was named "Tupac Shakur Way". Mayor Brandon Scott said "Shakur served as an inspiration to him."

==== Rankings ====
- 2002: Forbes magazine ranked Shakur at 10th among top-earning dead celebrities.
- 2003: MTV's viewers voted Shakur the greatest MC.
- 2005: Shakur was voted No.1 on Vibe's online poll of "Top 10 Best of All Time".
- 2006: MTV staff placed him second on its list of "The Greatest MCs Of All Time".
- 2012: The Source magazine ranked him No. 5 among "The Top 50 Lyricists".
- 2007: The Rock and Roll Hall of Fame placed All Eyez on Me at No. 90 and Me Against the World at No. 170.
- 2010: Rolling Stone magazine placed Shakur at No. 86 among the "100 Greatest Artists".
- 2020: All Eyez on Me was ranked No. 436 on Rolling Stone's list of the "500 Greatest Albums Of All Time".
- 2023: Billboard ranked Shakur at number 4 of the top 50 rappers.

== Discography ==
Solo studio albums

- 2Pacalypse Now (1991)
- Strictly 4 My N.I.G.G.A.Z... (1993)
- Me Against the World (1995)
- All Eyez on Me (1996)

Posthumous solo studio albums

- The Don Killuminati: The 7 Day Theory (1996) (as Makaveli)
- R U Still Down? (Remember Me) (1997)
- Until the End of Time (2001)
- Better Dayz (2002)
- Loyal to the Game (2004)
- Pac's Life (2006)

Collaborative studio album

- Thug Life, Volume I (with Thug Life) (1994)

Posthumous collaborative studio album

- Still I Rise (with Outlawz) (1999)

== Filmography ==
=== Film ===
Year	Title	Role	Notes
1991	Nothing but Trouble	Himself (in a fictional context)	Brief appearance as part of the group Digital Underground
1992	Juice	Roland Bishop	First starring role
1993	Poetic Justice	Lucky	Co-starred with Janet Jackson
1994	Above the Rim	Birdie	Co-starred with Duane Martin. Final film release during his lifetime
1995	Murder Was the Case: The Movie	Sniper	Uncredited; segment: "Natural Born Killaz"
1996	Bullet	Tank	Released one month after Shakur's death
1997	Gridlock'd	Ezekiel "Spoon" Whitmore	Released four months after Shakur's death
1997	Gang Related	Detective Jake Rodriguez	Shakur's last performance in a film
2003	Tupac: Resurrection	Himself	Archive footage

=== Television ===
Year	Title	Role	Notes
1991	Pump It Up	Himself	Uncredited – Brief cameo as part of the group Digital Underground
1992	Drexell's Class	Himself	Brief appearance as part of the group Digital Underground
1993	A Different World	Piccolo	Season 6, Episode 23: Homie Don't Ya Know Me?
1993	In Living Color	Himself	Season 5, Episode 3: "Ike Turner and Hooch"
1996	Saturday Night Special	Himself (guest host)	1 episode
1996	Saturday Night Live	Himself (musical guest)	Episode: "Tom Arnold/Tupac Shakur"
1996	MTV Video Music Awards	Himself (presenter)	His final public appearances

=== Portrayals in film ===
Year	Title	Portrayed by	Notes
2001	Too Legit: The MC Hammer Story	Lamont Bentley	Biographical film about MC Hammer
2009	Notorious	Anthony Mackie	Biographical film about the Notorious B.I.G.
2015	Straight Outta Compton	Marcc Rose	Biographical film about N.W.A
2016	Surviving Compton: Dre, Suge & Michel'le	Adrian Arthur	Biographical film about Michel'le
2017	All Eyez on Me	Demetrius Shipp Jr.	Biographical film about Tupac Shakur
2018	Unsolved	Marcc Rose	TV series about the murders of Tupac Shakur and the Notorious B.I.G.
2018	City of Lies	Unknown	Film about the investigations by the LAPD of the murders of rappers Tupac Shakur and the Notorious B.I.G.
2021	BMF	Mason Douglas	Cameo appearance

=== Video games ===
Year	Title	Role	Notes
2027	Stranger Than Heaven	Amaru	Likeness only

=== Documentaries ===
Shakur's life has been explored in several documentaries, most notably the Academy Award-nominated Tupac: Resurrection (2003).

- 1996: America's Most Wanted
- 1997: Unsolved Mysteries
- 1997: Tupac Shakur: Thug Immortal
- 1997: Tupac Shakur: Words Never Die (TV)
- 1998: BioRhythm
- 2001: Tupac Shakur: Before I Wake...
- 2001: Welcome to Deathrow
- 2002: Tupac Shakur: Thug Angel
- 2002: Biggie & Tupac
- 2002: Tha Westside
- 2003: 2Pac 4 Ever
- 2003: Tupac: Resurrection
- 2003: Beef
- 2004: Tupac vs.
- 2004: Tupac: The Hip Hop Genius (TV)
- 2006: So Many Years, So Many Tears
- 2006: Remembering Makaveli, Volume 1
- 2006: Rap Sheet: Hip Hop and the Cops
- 2007: Tupac Assassination: Conspiracy or Revenge
- 2007: Final 24
- 2008: Inside Death Row
- 2009: Tupac Assassination II: Reckoning
- 2010: 30 for 30: One Night in Vegas
- 2010: Famous Crime Scene
- 2011: Tupac Uncensored and Uncut: The Lost Prison Tapes
- 2011: Pop Profiles
- 2011: Tupac Shakur: Thug Angel 2
- 2015: Murder Rap: Inside the Biggie and Tupac Murders
- 2016: Hollywood Homicide Uncovered
- 2016: BuzzFeed Unsolved
- 2016: Vanity Fair Confidential
- 2017: Who Killed Tupac?
- 2017: Who Shot Biggie & Tupac?
- 2017: Tupac Assassination III: Battle for Compton
- 2017: Unsung Hollywood
- 2017: Snapped Notorious
- 2018: Unsolved: Murders of Biggie and Tupac?
- 2018: Hip-Hop Evolution
- 2018: Death Row Chronicles
- 2021: The Life & Death of Tupac Shakur
- 2021: A Life in Ten Pictures
- 2021: Dark Side of the 90s
- 2021: Last Man Standing: Suge Knight and the Murders of Biggie & Tupac
- 2022: Deathbed Confessions
- 2023: Dear Mama
- 2023: Fame Kills: Tupac
- 2023: Tupac & Biggie: Worlds Collide
- 2026: The Tupac Tapes

== See also ==
- List of Death Row Records artists
- List of artists who reached number one in the United States
- List of awards and nominations received by Tupac Shakur
- List of best-selling music artists
- List of highest-certified music artists in the United States
- List of unsolved murders (1980–1999)
- Lists of Billboard 200 number-one albums
- Lists of Billboard number-one singles
- List of African-American activists
- List of homicides in Nevada
- List of assassinations
