= Dear Mama (TV series) =

- Genre: Documentary
- Directed by: Allen Hughes
- Starring: Tupac Shakur; Afeni Shakur
- Music by: Atticus Ross; Leopold Ross; Claudia Sarne
- Country of origin: United States
- Original language: English
- No. of seasons: 1
- No. of episodes: 5

Production
- Executive producers: Nelson George; Allen Hughes; Lasse Järvi; Quincy Jones III; Jamal Joseph; Charles King; Peter Nelson; Adel Nur; Staci Robinson; Ted Skillman
- Producers: Joshua Garcia; Loren Gomez; Malcolm Stewart; James Jenkins; Stef Smith; Tom Pellegrini
- Cinematography: Isaac Bauman; Matthew Chuang; Eduardo Fierro; Laura Valladao; Logan Schneider
- Editors: Alex Chu; Ron Eigen; Lasse Järvi; Tom Parsons; Aaron Naar; Seth Skundrick
- Running time: 50–66 minutes
- Production companies: Defiant Ones Media Group; Amaru Entertainment; DreamCrew Entertainment; MACRO; Interscope Films; PolyGram Entertainment; FXP

Original release
- Network: FX
- Release: April 21, 2023

Dear Mama: The Saga of Afeni and Tupac Shakur is an American television documentary miniseries directed by Allen Hughes, about Tupac Shakur and his mother Afeni Shakur. It premiered on FX on April 21, 2023. It received critical acclaim.

== Summary ==
The docuseries explores the lives and legacies of Tupac Shakur and his mother, Black Panther Party activist Afeni Shakur. It includes never before seen audio and video footage, as well as interviews with Snoop Dogg, Dr. Dre, Mike Tyson, Eminem and, Jamal Joseph.

== Cast ==
- Tupac Shakur
- Afeni Shakur
- Billy Garland
- Snoop Dogg
- Shock G
- Money-B
- Mike Tyson
- Dr. Dre
- Eminem
- Jamal Joseph
- Leila Steinberg
- Gobi Rahimi

== Production ==
The docuseries was announced on May 21, 2019, with the Shakur Estate granting full access to Shakur's released and unreleased recordings, writings, and poetry. It was originally titled Outlaw. On January 12, 2023, FX announced the premiere date for Dear Mama. Allen Hughes serves as writer, director, and executive producer, alongside writer and executive producer Lasse Järvi, and executive producers Quincy Jones III, Staci Robinson, Nelson George, Charles King, Peter Nelson, Adel Nur, Jamal Joseph, and Ted Skillman. He and his brother Albert directed the music video for Shakur's 1991 single "Brenda's Got a Baby." The music score is by Atticus Ross, Leopold Ross, and Claudia Sarne.

== Release ==
The first trailer of Dear Mama was released on May 9, 2022. The first episode was shown at the Toronto International Film Festival on September 15, 2022. The first two episodes premiered on FX on April 21, 2023, with the final episode on May 12, 2023. It consists of five episodes.

== Reception ==
=== Audience viewership ===
According to FX, Dear Mama: The Saga of Afeni and Tupac Shakur was the most-watched unscripted series premiere in the network’s history.

=== Critical response ===
On the review aggregator website Rotten Tomatoes, 100% of 7 critics' reviews are positive, with an average rating of 9.00/10. Metacritic, which uses a weighted average, assigned the film a score of 78 out of 100, based on 4 critics, indicating "generally positive reviews."

Judy Berman of Time wrote, "Paired with intimate reflections and philosophical insights from the Shakurs’ closest relatives as well as peers in hip-hop and activism, it adds up to one of the most thorough, sensitive portraits I’ve seen of an artist who has by now been eulogized for longer than he was alive—and of the remarkable woman who created him." Johnny Loftus of Decider asserted, "The five-part series Dear Mama feels like the Tupac Shakur documentary of record as it connects the rapper’s enduring legacy to the philosophies at work in his upbringing and presents its story in a challenging, rewarding nonlinear fashion."

Daniel Fienberg of The Hollywood Reporter asserted, "Dear Mama has some real insights into the intersection of Black activism and popular music in the late 20th century," calling the documentary "challenging and not always successful, but the challenges feel right for the subject." Martin Brown of Common Sense Media gave Dear Mama a grade of 5 out of 5 stars, praised the presence of positive messages and role models, citing compassion, loyalty, and the focus on Black activism.

=== Accolades ===
Accolades for Dear Mama
Year	Award	Category	Nominee(s)	Result	Ref.
2023	Black Reel Awards for Television	Outstanding Documentary	Allen Hughes	Won	
2023	Primetime Emmy Awards	Outstanding Documentary or Nonfiction Series	Lasse Järvi, Nelson George, Peter Nelson, Jamal Joseph, Ted Skillman, Allen Hughes, Stef Smith, Loren Gomez, Joshua Garcia, and James Jenkins	Nominated	
2023	Primetime Emmy Awards	Outstanding Writing for a Nonfiction Program	Allen Hughes and Lasse Järvi (Episode: "Panther Power")	Nominated	
2024	Grammy Awards	Best Music Film	Allen Hughes, Joshua Garcia, Loren Gomez, James Jenkins, and Stef Smith	Nominated	
2024	Independent Spirit Awards	Best New Non-Scripted or Documentary Series	Lasse Järvi, Quincy "QD3" Jones III, Staci Robinson, Nelson George, Charles D. King, Peter Nelson, Adel "Future" Nur, Jamal Joseph, Ted Skillman, Allen Hughes, Steve Berman, Marc Cimino, Jody Gerson, John Janick, Nicholas Ferrall, and Nigel Sinclair	Won	
2024	NAACP Image Awards	Outstanding Documentary (Television)	Dear Mama	Nominated	
2024	NAACP Image Awards	Outstanding Directing in a Documentary	Allen Hughes	Won	
