= Demetrius Shipp Jr. =

American actor (born 1988)

Demetrius Shipp Jr
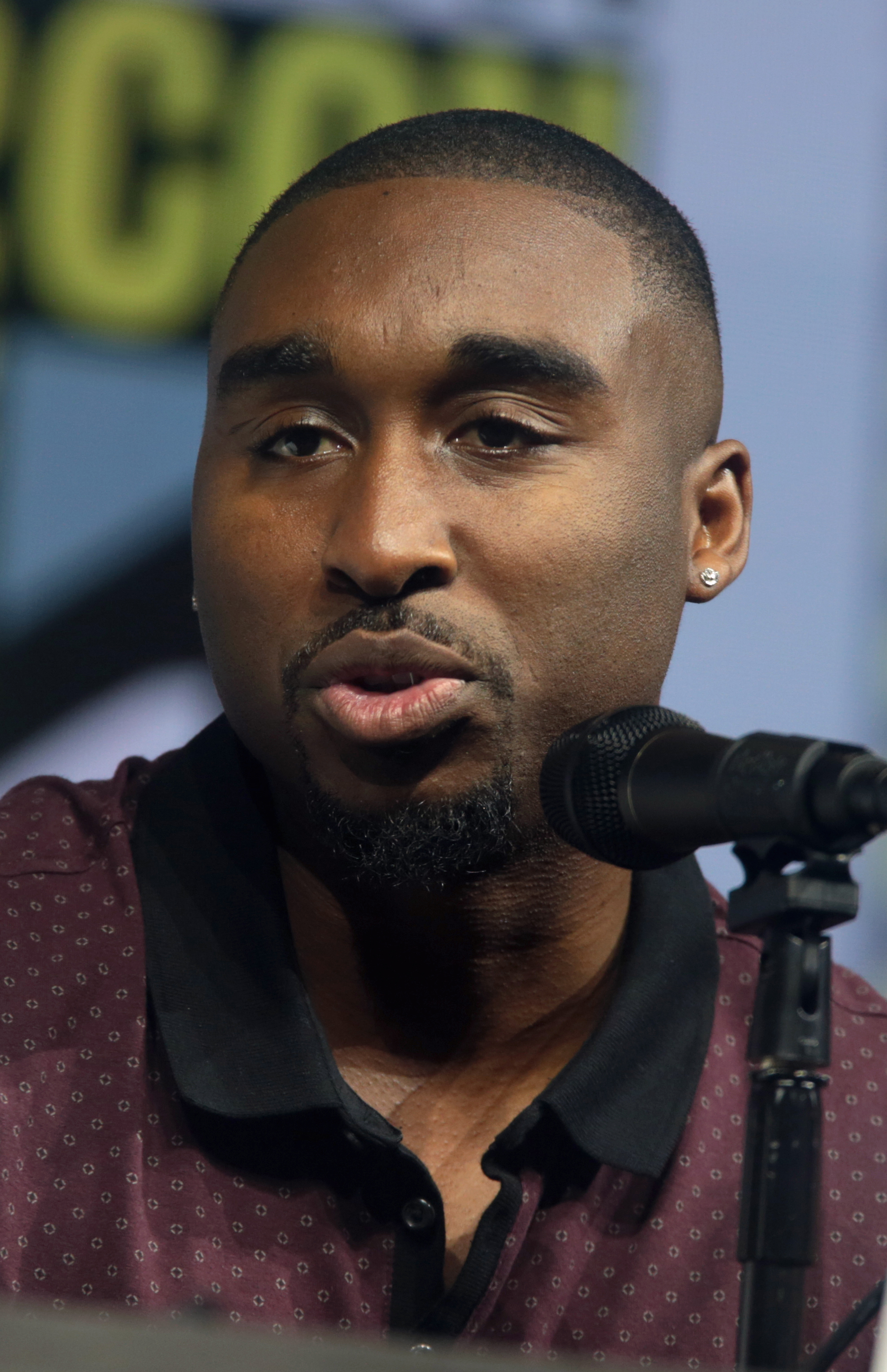
- Shipp at the 2018 San Diego Comic-Con
- Born: November 20, 1988 (age 37); Carson, California, U.S.
- Occupations: Actor; music producer
- Years active: 2015–present
- Notable work: All Eyez on Me

Demetrius Shipp Jr. (born November 20, 1988) is an American actor. He portrayed rapper and actor Tupac Shakur in the 2017 biopic All Eyez on Me, as well as gang leader Tyrone Moore in All American.

Shipp was cast in the role of Tupac in 2011, after a friend suggested he audition given his strong resemblance to the legendary hip-hop artist. Shipp remarked in an interview that he "never aspired to act." Principal photography did not begin until 2015, and the film was released in June 2017. Shipp's father worked with Tupac Shakur on the 1996 album The Don Killuminati: The 7 Day Theory on the song "Toss It Up".

Shipp worked at Target and Dish Network prior to his acting career.

== Filmography ==
=== Film ===
Year	Title	Role	Notes
2017	All Eyez on Me	Tupac Shakur	
2020	Cut Throat City	Miracle	
2020	Same Difference	Marc	
2022	Asking for It	Cuzzo	
2023	Imani	Bently	

=== Television ===
Year	Title	Role	Notes
2017	Tales	Kenny	Episode: "All I Need"
2018-2020	All American	Tyrone Moore	Recurring role
2019	#unlock'd	Marcus	TV movie
2021	Hip Hop Family Christmas	Derrick Lanceton	VH1 original Movie
2022	Hip Hop Family Christmas Wedding	Derrick Lanceton	VH1 original Movie
2022	A Miracle Before Christmas	Caleb	BET Plus Movie

=== Self ===
Year	Title	Role	Notes	
2017	WGN Morning News	Himself	TV series	Appearing in episode aired 9 June 2017
2017	The Tonight Show Starring Jimmy Fallon	Himself	TV series	Appearing in episode aired 12 June 2017
2017	The Wendy Williams Show	Himself	TV series	Appearing in episode aired 13 June 2017
2017	Dish Nation	Himself	TV series	Appearing in episode aired 16 June 2017
2017	Made in Hollywood	Himself	TV series	Appearing in episode aired 17 June 2017
2017	Conan	Himself	TV series	Appearing in episode aired 19 June 2017
2017	Hip Hop Squares	Himself	TV series	Contesting on episode aired 2 October 2017
