= Cut Throat City =

2020 film directed by RZA

- Theatrical release poster
- Directed by: RZA
- Written by: Paul Cuschieri
- Produced by: William Clevinger; Sean Lydiard; Elliott Michael Smith; Michael Mendelsohn; Kyle Tekiela
- Starring: Shameik Moore; Demetrius Shipp Jr.; Denzel Whitaker; Keean Johnson; Kat Graham; T.I.; Terrence Howard; Rob Morgan; Eiza González; Ethan Hawke; Wesley Snipes
- Cinematography: Brandon Cox
- Edited by: Joe D'Augustine; Chris Berkenkamp
- Music by: Dhani Harrison; Paul Hicks
- Production companies: Rumble Riot Pictures; Patriot Pictures; XYZ Films
- Distributed by: Well Go USA Entertainment
- Release date: August 21, 2020 (United States)
- Running time: 123 minutes
- Country: United States
- Language: English
- Budget: $8.9 million
- Box office: $864,928

Cut Throat City is a 2020 American heist film directed by RZA from a screenplay by Paul Cuschieri. The film stars Shameik Moore, T.I., Demetrius Shipp Jr., Kat Graham, Wesley Snipes, Terrence Howard, Eiza González and Ethan Hawke.

Cut Throat City was released in the United States on August 21, 2020, by Well Go USA Entertainment. The film received positive reviews from critics.

== Plot ==
In 2005 New Orleans, four friends; Blink, Miracle, Andre, and Junior prepare for Blink's wedding to Demyra. Hurricane Katrina soon decimates the city. Six months later, Blink, an aspiring artist who is working on a graphic novel he calls "Cut Throat City", is denied a chance to publish his work and becomes disgruntled. Residing in the crime stricken Lower Ninth Ward, he and his friends struggle with poverty. Blink and Demyra apply for FEMA aid and are denied. Blink suggests he and his friends meet with Demyra's cousin, Lorenzo Bass, a local drug lord.

Bass offers them a job to rob a casino. During the heist, security arrives and a shootout ensues. The group escapes but is tailed by the police and Andre is killed. The group pays a local Reverend to help them dispose of Andre's body. The trio present themselves to Bass with their $20,000 in earnings who informs them that the news reported they escaped with $150,000 and refuses to negotiate. Bass orders Blink to "walk the plank" by exposing his penis to a caged raccoon, but Junior uses a dog whistle to call his Rottweiler. The dog attacks Bass as the trio fight his henchmen. Bass kills the dog and prepares to shoot Blink but is out of ammunition and the trio escape. Meanwhile, Detective Lucinda Valencia is assigned to investigate the casino robbery.

The trio stay at the home of Blink's hermit father, Lawrence. Blink suggests they ask crime lord, The Saint, for help. Det. Valencia meets with the corrupt Det. Courtney who offers her little assistance but she soon learns that Bass set the group up as he has inside connections to the casino. Meanwhile, Demyra is threatened by Bass, and so she meets with Alderman Jackson Symms, whose wife she provided hospice services for, and he agrees to help. He meets with Det. Courtney and asks him to deliver the information and a payment to The Saint. Det. Valencia meets with Blink after finding his bloody clothing and a poker chip. However, she has a change of heart after learning the reality of the situation from Symms.

Blink, Miracle, and Junior rob local businesses in an attempt to make quick cash and attract the attention of The Saint. They are successful, but when Blink's father finds their money, he forces the group to leave. They visit a strip club where they flash their earnings and are taken prisoner by Det. Courtney and his men. They are delivered to The Saint who is impressed with the trio and allows them to live in exchange for cash. They return to the Ninth Ward and Det. Valencia concludes her investigation, urging Blink to pursue his artistic dreams instead of a life of crime. Symms and The Saint meet to discuss the situation. Soon after, Bass presents himself to The Saint who shoots him in the head.

Some time later, the trio continue to find themselves in poverty. Blink proposes they rob a FEMA office but the robbery goes wrong when Miracle kills a security guard. The police swarm the building and all three men are killed in the ensuing firefight. However, this is revealed to have been the new ending Blink wrote for his graphic novel; Valencia congratulates him at its publishing and he thanks her for giving him a second chance.

During the ending credits, Symms meets with Courtney at the grave of Andre where he shoots him dead and frames Miracle for it, before appointing him as the new overseer of the Lower Ninth.

== Cast ==
- Shameik Moore as Blink
- Demetrius Shipp Jr. as Miracle
- T.I. as Lorenzo 'Cousin' Bass
- Terrence Howard as The Saint
- Ethan Hawke as Jackson Symms
- Wesley Snipes as Lawrence
- Eiza González as Det. Lucinda Valencia
- Denzel Whitaker as Andre
- Keean Johnson as Junior
- Kat Graham as Demyra
- Rob Morgan as Det. Courtney
- Joel David Moore as Peter Felton
- Isaiah Washington as Sinclair Stewart
- Sam Daly as O'Malley
- Tyron Woodley as Loser

== Production ==
=== Casting ===
In December 2017, it was announced Terrence Howard, Wesley Snipes, T.I., Eiza González, Demetrius Shipp Jr. Shameik Moore, Joel David Moore, Kat Graham, Rob Morgan, Keean Johnson, Denzel Whitaker, Isaiah Washington and Sam Daly had joined the cast of the film, with RZA directing from a screenplay by Paul Cuschieri, with Elliott Michael Smith p.g.a., William Clevinger p.g.a., Sean Lydiard p.g.a., Michael Mendelson, Kyle Tekiela serving as producers; (Rumble Riot Pictures, Patriot Pictures and XYZ Films banners, respectively). In December 2018, Ethan Hawke joined the cast of the film.

=== Filming ===
Principal photography began in December 2017, in New Orleans, Louisiana.

== Release ==
=== Theatrical ===
In June 2018, Well Go USA Entertainment acquired distribution rights to the film. It was scheduled to have its world premiere at South by Southwest on March 14, 2020. However, the festival was cancelled due to the COVID-19 pandemic. It was then rescheduled to be released on April 10, 2020. However, it was pulled from the schedule due to the pandemic. It was then rescheduled for July 17, later delayed to July 31, 2020, and delayed once more to August 21, 2020.

== Reception ==
=== Box office ===
The film made $240,000 from 407 theaters in its opening weekend.

=== Critical response ===
On review aggregator Rotten Tomatoes, Cut Throat City holds an approval rating of 69% based on 42 reviews with an average of 6.1/10. The website's critics consensus reads: "An evolution for director RZA, Cut Throat City overcomes occasionally muddled storytelling on the strength of its raw, infectious energy." On Metacritic, the film has a weighted average score of 67 out of 100, based on 11 critics, indicating "generally favorable" reviews.

== See also ==
- List of hood films
