= Leila Steinberg =

American poet (born 1961)

- Born: December 18, 1961 (age 64); Los Angeles, California
- Occupations: Manager, educator, author, producer
- Style: Hip hop, R&B, pop, dance-pop

Leila Steinberg (born December 18, 1961) is an American manager, business woman, educator, writer, poet, and founder of AIM4TheHeART, a 501(c)(3) non-profit dedicated to helping at-risk youth find their voice using an emotional literacy curriculum and writing workshops. She is best known as the artist mentor and first manager for superstar rapper Tupac Shakur. They met when he was a student in her writing workshop, The Microphone Sessions, in the Oakland Bay area. Today Leila manages the rapper Earl Sweatshirt, formerly of Odd Future.

In the 2017 Tupac biopic All Eyez On Me, Leila was played by actress Lauren Cohan.

In 2023, Leila was interviewed in the FX television documentaries series Dear Mama.

== Life and work ==
Steinberg was born in Los Angeles, California. Her mother was an activist of Mexican-Turkish descent, and her father was a criminal defense lawyer of Polish-Jewish descent.

During the late 1980s, Steinberg performed as a backup dancer and singer, touring with musicians O.J. Ekemode & The Nigerian Allstars. She also shared the stage with Santana, Bo Diddley, The Neville Brothers, The Spinners, Burning Spear and Jimmy Cliff. As a veteran music industry executive, she served as a marketer with Atlantic Records, Sony, Def Jam, Tommy Boy, Interscope, and Relativity.

She currently resides in Southern California near her four children and two grandchildren.

While living in the San Francisco Bay Area, Steinberg held poetry classes in Santa Rosa. Among her students was young Tupac Shakur. After he came to her poetry class in spring 1989, they hit it off. For a time he lived with her and her family, and read and wrote under her encouragement. She served as a mentor and manager until he needed more professional help. He signed with Atron Gregory in 1989.

Steinberg and Shakur further developed what they called The Microphone Sessions (TMS), a writing workshop that develops the spoken word, poetry, musical, hip-hop, pop and dance, jazz, rock n' roll singing, and dramatic performances. Weekly gatherings are held worldwide, led by Steinberg-trained artist-educators.

Steinberg co-teaches a class on Race and the Law at USC's Law School with Professor Jody Armour. For more than 25 years, she has also taught her class to inmates at San Quentin, through the No More Tears program. One of her students, Curtis "Wall Street" Carroll, has become known as the "Oracle of San Quentin" because of his success in stock picks.
