= Afeni Shakur =

American political activist (1947–2016)

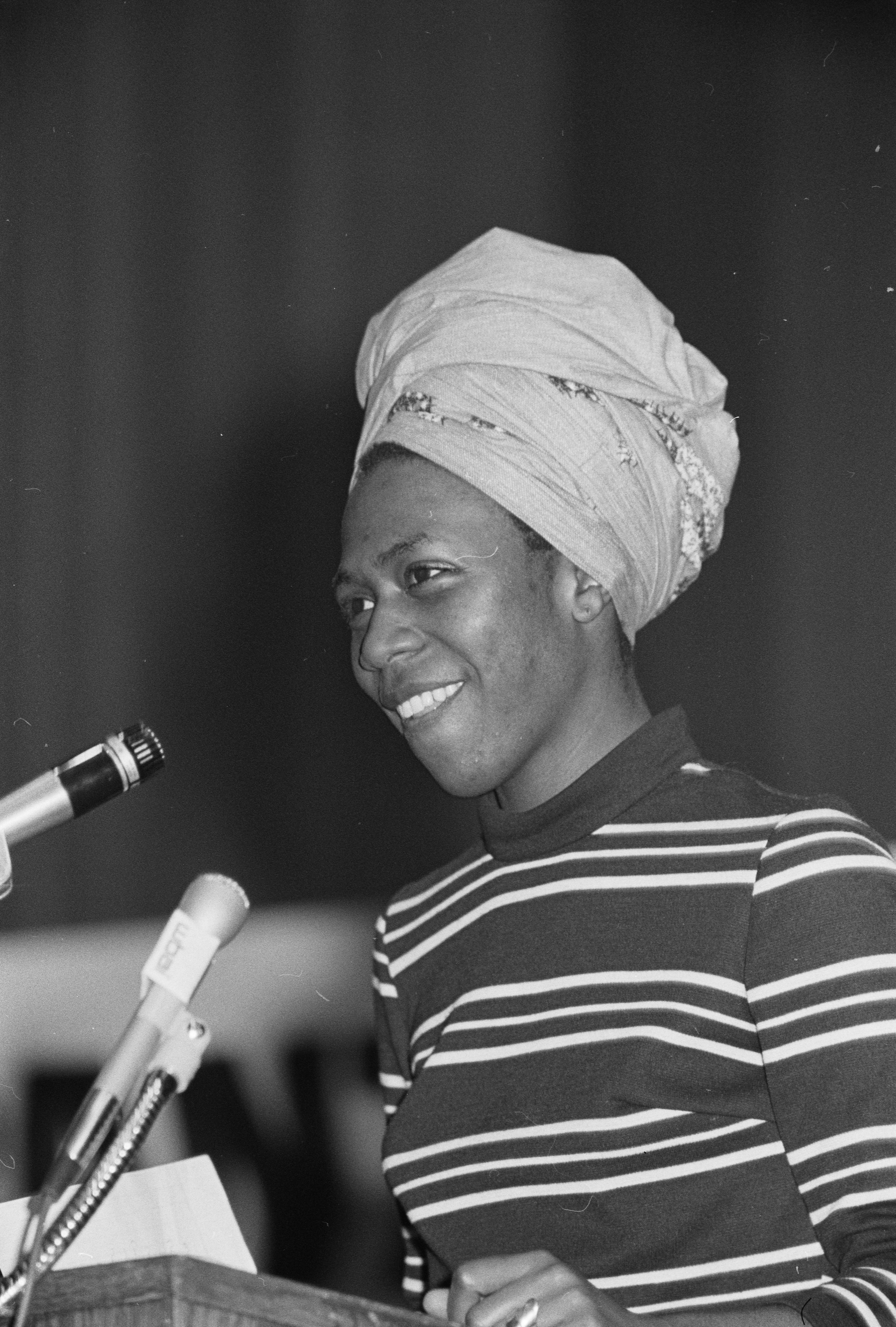
- Shakur in 1970
- Born: Alice Faye Williams; January 10, 1947; Lumberton, North Carolina, U.S.
- Died: May 2, 2016 (aged 69); Sausalito, California, U.S.
- Occupation: Activist
- Years active: 1968–1971
- Political party: Black Panther
- Spouses: Lumumba Shakur (m. 1968; div. 1971) Mutulu Shakur (m. 1975; div. 1982) Gust Davis Jr. (m. 2004)
- Partners: Billy Garland (1970); Carol Crooks (1970–1972)
- Children: 2, including Tupac
- Relatives: Kastro (nephew); Mopreme Shakur (stepson); Ayize Jama-Everett (stepson)

Afeni Shakur Davis (born Alice Faye Williams; January 10, 1947 – May 2, 2016) was an American political activist and member of the Black Panther Party. She was the mother of rapper Tupac Shakur and the executor of his estate. She founded the Tupac Amaru Shakur Foundation and was the CEO of Amaru Entertainment, Inc., a record and film production company she founded.

== Early life ==
Afeni Shakur was born Alice Williams on January 10, 1947, in Lumberton, North Carolina. She had an older sister, Gloria "Glo" Jean. At the age of eleven in 1958, Williams and her sister moved to the South Bronx with their mother, a factory worker.

Williams attended Benjamin Franklin Junior High School in the Bronx, where she demonstrated above average reading ability and her grades qualified her for honors. She wrote for the school newspaper, The Franklin Flash, and in the ninth grade, won a journalism award for which she received congratulations from Mayor Robert F. Wagner. In 1962, Williams passed the qualifying examinations for the Bronx High School of Science and High School of Performing Arts in Manhattan. She chose the latter because she felt performers and actors were free spirited. However, Williams could not afford the school supplies and she felt like an outcast at the school, so she dropped out after one term. She began drifting and became a member of a Bronx street gang called the Disciples.

She briefly worked a postal job, becoming one of the first woman mail carriers in New York.

== Activism ==
After hearing Bobby Seale speak, Williams joined the Black Panther Party when they opened an office in Harlem in 1968. There she met Lumumba Shakur (born Anthony Coston), a Sunni Muslim, whom she married in November 1968. Following their marriage, she changed her name to Afeni Shakur. She became a section leader of the Harlem chapter and a mentor to new members such as Jamal Joseph.

=== The Panther 21 ===
In April 1969, she and twenty other Black Panthers were arrested and charged with several counts of conspiracy to bomb police stations and other public places in New York. Bail was set at $100,000 (equivalent to $877,949 in 2025) for each of the 21 suspects. The Black Panthers decided to raise bail money for Joseph and Shakur first, so those two could work on raising bail for the remaining 19 members. The pre-trial started in February 1970 and the actual trial commenced on September 8, 1970. Charges brought against her and the other members of the Black Panther Party were attempted murder, conspiracy to commit murder, conspiracy to bomb buildings, and conspiracy. Shakur represented herself at trial, interviewing several witnesses and arguing in court. In her autobiography, Shakur wrote, "I was young. I was arrogant. And I was brilliant in court... because I thought this was the last time I could speak. The last time before they locked me up forever... I was writing my own obituary." Her statements and questioning of the government infiltrators during the trial are credited with helping to expose the FBI's corruption and help save the Panther 21.

One of the people Shakur cross-examined was Ralph White, a "suspect" who had, in fact, infiltrated the Black Panthers while working as an undercover policeman. Shakur had repeatedly denounced White as a cop because he was "a hothead ... too arrogant for a Panther." White testified it was retaliation for refusing to hire her to work in the Harlem Panther office. Shakur got White to admit under oath that he and two other agents had organized most of the unlawful activities. "She asked him if he'd ever seen her carry a gun or kill anyone or bomb anything and he answered no, no, no. Then she asked if he'd seen her doing Panther organizing in a school and a hospital and on the streets and he answered, yes, yes, yes."

She and the others in the "Panther 21" were acquitted in May 1971 after an eight-month trial. Altogether, Afeni Shakur spent two years in the New York Women's House of Detention before being acquitted. While in the House of Detention, Shakur says, she "began relating to the gay sisters in jail beginning to understand their oppression, their anger and the strength in them and in all gay people." After being released, she participated in a workshop organized by the Gay Liberation Front at the Revolutionary People's Constitutional Convention in 1970, and she continued to advocate against homophobia in the Black Panthers.

=== Bedford Hills Correctional Facility ===
As a paralegal, Shakur often worked in New York's only women's prison at the time, the Bedford Hills Correctional Facility.

Shakur played a large role in the case Crooks v. Warne involving Bedford inmate, Carol Crooks. Shakur and Crooks met while they were both incarcerated at the Women's House of Detention, and (according to Crooks herself) began a romantic relationship with each other that continued after Shakur's release from prison, and into her son Tupac’s early infancy. Following the events of what would come to be known as the August Rebellion, Shakur helped connect Crooks to prisoners' rights attorney, Steven Latimer. The case was decided in Crooks' favor and won incarcerated women the right to due process prior to their being sent to segregated prison, or solitary confinement.

While working with the South Bronx Legal Services in 1973, Shakur helped organize a day of solidarity for families and friends of the Bedford Hills Correctional Facility for Women.

== Later life ==
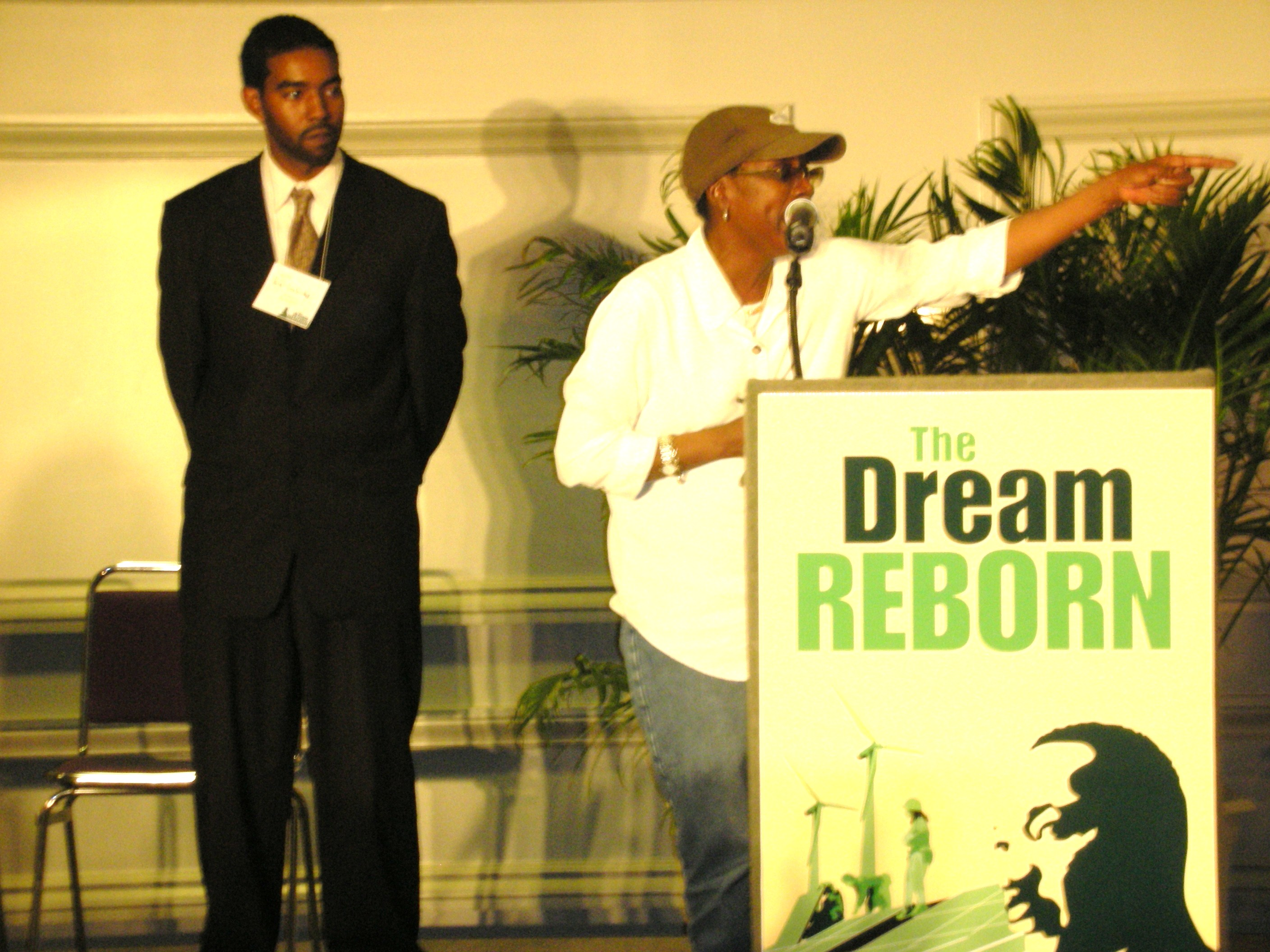
Shakur (right) giving a speech in 2001

After Shakur was acquitted, she did not return to the Black Panther Party. On June 16, 1971, she gave birth to her son, Parish Lesane Crooks, who was later renamed Tupac Amaru Shakur. Having miscarried "four or five" times prior to Tupac's birth, she had not anticipated a successful pregnancy. Shakur's marriage fell apart when it was discovered that Lumumba was not the biological father of her son. His biological father was Billy Garland.

In 1975, Shakur married Mutulu Shakur (born Jeral Williams) and had their daughter, Sekyiwa. They divorced in 1982. Shakur worked as a paralegal with Bronx Legal Services and was a union member of the Legal Services Staff Association for a decade before leaving the state and descending into a crack cocaine addiction in the early 1980s.

Shakur moved her son and daughter to Baltimore, Maryland in 1984. She relocated to a family friend's home in Marin County, California to manage her drug use. In 1989, her son left home because of her. The two later reconciled. She overcame her addiction after she moved back to New York in 1991 and started Narcotics Anonymous meetings. Nine months into her recovery program, Tupac sent her $5,000 even though their relationship was strained.

Although Tupac struggled in his relationship with his mother, he paid tribute to her in his song "Dear Mama". In the song, he reflects on his childhood, acknowledges Afeni's troubles with addiction, and expresses his love for her: "And even as a crack fiend mama, you always was a black queen mama, I finally understand for a woman it ain't easy tryin' to raise a man, you always was committed, a poor single mother on welfare tell me how you did it, there's no way I can pay you back, but the plan is to show you that I understand you are appreciated."

After Tupac died in Las Vegas on September 13, 1996, six days after being shot in a drive-by shooting, she had him cremated the next day. His close friends, actresses Jada Pinkett and Jasmine Guy, provided emotional support for Shakur and advised her to hire lawyers to sort out Tupac's assets.

In 2004, Shakur released her biography, Afeni Shakur: Evolution of a Revolutionary. In her biography, which was written by Jasmine Guy, Shakur reflected on her childhood experiences and her upbringing as well as her involvement in the Black Panther Party. In the book, she stated that the party educated and directed her to channel her anger. She described her experiences in jail and how together with other inmates, they organized a bail fund to get some of the women out of jail.

Shakur traveled across the U.S., making guest appearances and delivering lectures. On February 6, 2009, she gave the keynote address for Vanderbilt University's Commemoration for Black History Month. She shared with people her experiences and ways in which to overcome loss.

Shakur later married The Reverend Gust Davis Jr., from whom she separated in 2015. Afeni Shakur filed for divorce in March 2016, however proceedings were subsequently terminated upon her death.

Shakur died at a hospital in Greenbrae, California, at around 10:28 p.m. on May 2, 2016, after going into cardiac arrest at her home earlier in the evening; she was 69. Her body was cremated.

== Estate of Tupac Shakur ==
Following her son's death, Tupac's biological father Billy Garland attempted to inherit half of his estate, which Shakur opposed because Garland was an "absentee father who contributed little to Tupac's upbringing." A judge denied his claim.

Exactly one year after Tupac's death, with revenue from his albums released posthumously, Shakur founded the Georgia-based Tupac Amaru Shakur Foundation to provide art programs for young people and the Tupac Amaru Shakur Center for the Arts in Stone Mountain, Georgia.

In 1997, she founded Amaru Entertainment, a holding company for all of Tupac's unreleased material. She also launched a fashion clothing line, Makaveli Branded in 2003.

Shakur was reportedly in federal court on July 20, 2007, to file an injunction to prevent Death Row Records from selling any unreleased material from Tupac after the company failed to prove that the unreleased songs were not part of its bankruptcy settlement.

In 2013, Shakur sued Entertainment One claiming they failed to pay Tupac's estate royalties worth seven figures for 2007's Beginnings: The Lost Tapes. The estate also sued for the ownership of the master recordings for all of Tupac's unreleased music. A court ruled Entertainment One must pay over six figures for royalties from Shakur's posthumous releases and all the unreleased recordings would go back to the estate. Death Row Records initially owned the rights to his music, which was purchased by Entertainment One in 2006. On September 29, 2018, the Shakur Estate won the case against Entertainment One.

In 2014, Shakur helped create the Broadway musical Holler If Ya Hear Me, which featured Tupac's music.

Shakur was not involved in the production of All Eyez on Me, a film based on Tupac's life, stating she felt betrayed by her lawyer, who made the deal with the production company Morgan Creek against her wishes. When she learned of the deal, she fired her lawyer, hired new ones, and fought against the contract and production company. She went to court several times, spending millions of dollars, which she stated led to her selling the Tupac Amaru Shakur Center for the Arts, eventually settling for an undisclosed amount of money. Danai Gurira portrayed Shakur in the film.

Shakur set up a trust to control all of Tupac's music rights which assigned music executive Tom Whalley as the executor of his estate following her death in 2016.

== Legacy ==
Contemporary accounts have centred on Shakur's prison romance with fellow political activist Carol Jean Crooks, which continued after both were released (within a few months of each other) in 1971. This brief, but intense, relationship has been publicly corroborated by Crooks – with Denise Oliver-Velez further stating Shakur had declared Crooks to be Tupac's "father"; and historian Hugh Ryan claiming Crooks is in fact registered as such on Tupac's birth certificate.

Owing to renewed discussion on the topic of Afeni Shakur's sexuality, she is considered by many to have been a queer icon. Notwithstanding this, she kept her bisexual identity private, and "passed in 2016, without ever publicly discussing her relationship with Crooks".

== See also ==
- Tupac Shakur
- Assata Shakur
- Mopreme Shakur
