= Live Squad =

American hip hop group

- Origin: Queens, New York City, U.S.
- Genres: Hip-hop; Hardcore hip-hop
- Years active: 1988–1995
- Labels: Tommy Boy; Grand Imperial
- Past members: Majesty; DJ K-Low; Stretch (deceased)

Live Squad was an American hip hop group and production team from Hollis, Queens, New York City consisting of brothers Stretch (Randy Walker), Majesty (Christopher Walker) and DJ K-Low, best known for their early collaborations with Tupac Shakur.

== History ==
=== Formation and early years ===
Live Squad debuted in 1988 with the self-produced tracks "Troopin It" and "We Ain't Havin' It" on BQ In Full Effect, a limited 12" EP featuring Percee P and Top Priority.

In 1989, Stretch, K-Low, and Majesty met Shock G of Bay Area hip-hop group Digital Underground, with Stretch making a guest appearance on "Family of the Underground" from their 1991 album Sons Of The P and a Live Squad produced remix for their single "No Nose Job" that same year.

=== Friendship with Tupac Shakur ===
In the summer of 1991, Stretch met Digital Underground affiliate Tupac Shakur and the two made fast friends, becoming nearly inseparable. Their friendship developed while filming Juice, and the two would begin to make studio recordings, live performances, and televised appearances together: Stretch appeared on two songs from 2Pac's late 1991 album debut 2Pacalypse Now - including the Live Squad production "Tha Lunatic" - and backed Tupac on an episode of Yo! MTV Raps to perform his single, "If My Homie Calls". During Juice's production Tupac couldn't even get a song on the soundtrack, and his first album was only a modest success - but once the film was released in the beginning of 1992, Tupac's star was on the rise.

Stretch was also close friends with Ed Lover, host of Yo! MTV Raps, who helped get Live Squad signed to Tommy Boy Records by recommending their demo tape and executive producing their early releases.

=== Continued success ===
The group released the double A-side single Murderahh!/Heartless (1992) and the promo single "Game Of Survival / Pump For A Livin'" (1993), as well as an ultra-violent VHS promo mini-movie called Game Of Survival which was a showcase for 6 songs from their forthcoming album. Due to the movie's graphic nature and Live Squad's hardcore style, all while the backlash from Ice-T and Body Count's "Cop Killer" continued against rap music, Tommy Boy were forced to drop them from their radio-friendly roster and the album was shelved.

Live Squad continued to perform and record with 2Pac. For his 1993 sophomore album Strictly 4 My N.I.G.G.A.Z., Live Squad produced and featured on "Strugglin'" and joined in on the posse cut "5 Deadly Venoms", and Stretch produced two additional tracks on the album including the lead single and album opener, "Holler If Ya Hear Me". Stretch continued to make cameo appearances in his friends' movies: in the Tupac-directed music video for Mac Mall's "Ghetto Theme" (1992); Above The Law, Money B and Tupac's "Call It What U Want" (1993); Ed Lover & Doctor Dre's Who's the Man? (1993); and Tupac's Bullet, filmed in 1994.

One unreleased song from these sessions was "Thug Life", with raps from 2Pac, Stretch and Big Syke, and in 1993, Tupac expanded the group and signed them to Interscope Records for their sole album, 1994's Thug Life: Volume I. Stretch contributed raps and beats to the album, many of them co-produced with Tupac as 'Thug Music', including the lead single "Bury Me A G". As criticism of gangsta rap continued, songs were cut from the album by the label, including the planned first single "Out On Bail" (which Tupac performed with Stretch at The '94 Source Awards) and the Notorious B.I.G. collaboration "Runnin' from tha Police". Tupac had met the promising young rapper in 1993 and took him under his wing, even making him a prospective member of Thug Life. Live Squad, 2Pac and The Notorious B.I.G. had performed a joint set together at Maryland's Bowie State University in 1993 and collaborated on the unreleased track "House Of Pain", intended for Biggie's 1994 debut Ready To Die. The friendship between the three rappers, however, would soon be irrevocably damaged.

=== Quad Studios shooting ===
On the night of November 30, 1994, Stretch was with Tupac when he was attacked at Quad Recording Studios in Manhattan. Tupac had been hired by drug dealer and fledgling music manager Jimmy Henchman to record a feature for his artist Little Shawn's single "Dom Perignon", and Tupac, unsure of the situation, went to the studio with Stretch and two others. Upon arrival they saw The Notorious B.I.G.'s associates Lil' Cease and the Bad Boy camp, as the rapper was also there recording for the song, and their tensions were eased - but entering the building lobby they were held at gunpoint by three men and Tupac was robbed, shot and beaten. Both Stretch and Biggie went to the hospital to visit Tupac, but were unable to see him as he was in surgery. Shakur stated that he believed the robbery to be a cover for the attack, and began to openly speculate that Henchman, Biggie, and the others may have been involved.

Stretch and Tupac were still friends when Pac was sent to jail on 14 February 1995 for sexual assault charges, but their friendship quickly deteriorated after he learned that Stretch was still doing shows with The Notorious B.I.G. even though he had accused the rapper of being involved in his shooting. In a jailhouse interview with VIBE Magazine, Tupac insinuated Stretch, an imposing figure at 6'8", should have done more to help him and was surprisingly out of harm's way: "I was, like, 'What should I do?' I’m thinking Stretch is going to fight; he was towering over those niggas. From what I know about the criminal element, if niggas come to rob you, they always hit the big nigga first. But they didn’t touch Stretch; they came straight to me." By the time Me Against The World was released a month later, Stretch had been removed from the single "So Many Tears". In one of Tupac's letters from jail, he listed all of his enemies with their names crossed out - with Stretch's name last.

Stretch responded in his own interview with VIBE: "Pac's saying all this shit in the interview, like, "I thought that Stretch was gonna fight. He was towering over them." Now, that nigga know I ain't never going out like no bitch. But I ain't dumb. I ain't got no gun, what the fuck am I supposed to do? I might be towering over niggas, but I ain't towerin' over no slugs." He also questioned Tupac's account of events, and hinted that his gunshot wound may have been self-inflicted, something suggested by forensic reports: "Me personally, I only heard one shot. ... Tupac got shot trying to go for his shit. He tried to go for his gun, and he made a mistake on his own. But I'll let him tell the world that. ... He tried to turn around and pull the joint out real quick, but niggas caught him. Grabbed his hand when it was by his waist."

There was never any evidence to suggest Stretch was involved with the robbery. Bill Courtney, a retired NYPD cop from the infamous "Hip-Hop Squad", believed the stick-up was a response to comments Tupac had made in the New York Daily News against an associate of Jimmy Henchman, Haitian Jack: "A message was being sent to him not to name-drop." Jimmy Henchman has since admitted to orchestrating the shooting: "Nobody came to rob you. They came to discipline you."

Me and Pac have been down from day one. Before he did Juice, before his first album. That's my man. So the interview he did in VIBE bugged me out. But I know him. He likes to talk a lot. Especially when he's upset, he'll say shit that he won't even mean. And then he'll think about it later and be, like, "Damn, why the fuck did I say that?" ... In that interview, Pac was talking all that shit about Thug Life is ignorance and telling niggas' names and all that shit. I don't even understand why he went there. I've seen Pac mad times after the shooting and he never kicked none of that shit to me. You know how he feels about the media, so why would he go and do an interview like that? He's supposed to be a street nigga; he should've kept it in the street. I mean, niggas had to go and get their names changed. I want him to get a reality check. Recognize what the fuck he's doing. Niggas on the street live by rules, man. And that rule right there, that's a rule that's never to be broken.

— Randy "Stretch" Walker, VIBE Magazine, 1995

Ed Lover spoke to The New York Times about the falling out: "Tupac made disparaging remarks about him in VIBE Magazine and it really hurt his feelings a lot. I think - just my opinion - after Tupac got shot, I just think that Tupac just kind of turned against everybody."

The incriminations against Stretch continued once Tupac was released from federal custody to Death Row Records on 12 October 1995 and began a flurry of recordings for his 1996 album, All Eyez On Me; on "Ambitionz az a Ridah": "Had bitch-ass niggas on my team / So, indeed, they wet me up," and in the first verse of "Holla At Me": "When me and you was homies / No one informed me it was all a scheme / You infiltrated my team and sold a nigga dreams / How could you do me like that? / I took ya family in / I put some cash in ya pocket / Made you a man again [..] You're a shell of a man / I lost respect for you nigga / We can never be friends / I know I'm runnin' through your head now / What could you do? / If it was up to you / I'd be dead now / I let the world know nigga you a coward / You could never be Live / Until you die / See the motherfuckin' bitch in your eye."

Nas, who enlisted Live Squad to contribute beats for his sophomore album It Was Written in November 1995, later recollected the situation: "I met Stretch by some dangerous cats that I was hanging with. They put me with Stretch who they were cool with. Stretch became my brother immediately. He wasn’t really recognized for the great work he was doing with Tupac and the hardcore records he did with his own group Live Squad with his brother Majesty. ... Stretch was really hurt by Tupac. I would hear him talking about how Pac was so mad at him because Stretch was with Tupac when he got set up and robbed in the studio lobby. Tupac was mad at everyone after that. I felt bad for Stretch because he really had a lot of love for Pac and he couldn’t believe that Pac thought he had something to do with it."

=== Stretch's murder ===
On 30 November 1995, Stretch was murdered in a drive-by shooting exactly one year - almost to the minute - after the Quad Studio shooting, fuelling rumors. After a midnight Live Squad studio session with Nas and on his way to an event with Biggie, Stretch dropped off his brother Majesty at his Queens Village home when two or three men pulled up in a black car alongside his green minivan and began chase, shooting at Stretch while driving. Stretch's minivan came to a crashing stop at the corner of 112th Avenue & 209th Street just after 12:30 A.M., and he was found dead with four bullet wounds in his back.

Tupac denied involvement with Stretch's murder, but continued to talk about him after death, even up to his own on 13 September 1996. All Eyez On Me was released two months after Stretch's death with all disses intact, and the follow-up The Don Killuminati: The 7 Day Theory (1996) contained more allusions to Stretch's role in the 1994 attack on the tell-all diss track "Against All Odds": "And that nigga that was down for me, restin' dead / Switch sides, guess his new friends wanted him dead". Closing the final Tupac album, that track also fired shots at the Bad Boy camp and Nas - artists that he felt Stretch had switched allegiance to. Tupac did make peace with Nas in New York's Bryant Park on 4 September 1996, and even listened to It Was Written - featuring the Live Squad productions "Take It In Blood" and "Silent Murder" - as he made his fateful trip to Las Vegas for the Tyson-Seldon fight three days later. According to label boss Suge Knight, Tupac intended to remove the Nas disses from the Makaveli album but died before he could do so - there are no accounts if he resolved his feelings for his former friend.

Another theory for the murder would later emerge: "Stretch had robbed a big drug dealer of over 10 bricks [kilograms of cocaine]. There was pressure on the street for him to give those drugs back. And when he didn't, a hit was issued." In April 2007, as part of a separate investigation into the murder of legendary DJ and fellow Jamaica, Queens native Jam Master Jay, federal prosecutors named Ronald "Tenad" Washington as a suspect in both murders.

=== The aftermath ===
With both men dead, Stretch would appear on the posthumous 2Pac releases R U Still Down? (Remember Me) (1997), with the Live Squad production "Nothing To Lose", and Greatest Hits (1998), featuring the cryptic "God Bless The Dead" (dedicated to a Live Squad and Thug Life affiliate named "Biggy Smallz" that is not, as has been suggested, The Notorious B.I.G. nor a Latino rapper produced by frequent Tupac producer Johnny J). In 1999, a promo release for The Notorious B.I.G.'s own posthumous album Born Again featured a Bad Boy remix of "House Of Pain" featuring both Stretch and 2Pac.

Majesty would go on to co-found the record label Grand Imperial Records - with rapper E-Money Bags, himself slain on 16 July 2001 under the alleged order of Kenneth "Supreme" McGriff, the suspected boss behind the murder of Jam Master Jay - and continued to release music by Live Squad and Stretch, including in 2001 their unreleased album for Tommy Boy Records, Game Of Survival.

K-Low is still active in music and is also a guest speaker and mentor.

== Discography ==
- "Troopin It / We Ain't Havin' It" (1988)
- "No Nose Job (Fat Bass International Remix)" from Digital Underground's No Nose Job 12" (1991) (production)
- "Tha' Lunatic" from 2Pac's album 2pacalypse Now (1991) (production and vocals)
- "Roses (Live Squad Mix)" from Rhythm-N-Bass' Roses (1992) (production)
- "Murderahh / Heartless" (1992) (single)
- Heartless / Game of Survival - The Movie (1992) (VHS promo)
- "Game of Survival / Pump for a Livin" (1993) (promo single)
- "Strugglin'" & "5 Deadly Venoms" from 2Pac's Strictly 4 My N.I.G.G.A.Z. (1993) (production and vocals)
- "Take It In Blood" & "Silent Murder" from Nas' It Was Written (1996) (production)
- "Nothing to Lose" & "Only Fear of Death" from 2Pac's R U Still Down? (Remember Me) (1997) (production)
- Game of Survival (2001)
- The Tribute - The Forgotten Chapter In Hip Hop (2010)
