= Cradle to the Grave =

Single by Thug Life

from the album Thug Life, Volume I
- Released: November 4, 1994
- Genre: G-funk; gangsta rap; R&B
- Label: Out da Gutta; Interscope; Atlantic
- Songwriters: Tupac Shakur; Mopreme Shakur; Tyruss Himes; Macadoshis; The Rated R
- Producers: Professor Jay; Syke

Thug Life singles chronology
"Pour Out a Little Liquor" (1994)	"Cradle to the Grave" (1994)

2Pac singles chronology
"Pour Out a Little Liquor" (1994)	"Cradle to the Grave" (1994)	"Dear Mama" (1995)

Music video
- "Cradle to the Grave" on YouTube

″Cradle to the Grave″ is a song by American hip-hop recording artist 2Pac and his group, Thug Life, released on November 4, 1994 as a single from their one and only album, Thug Life, Volume I (1994). It is one of the few songs from the album that made it to the charts, peaking at number 25 on the Billboard Hot Rap Singles and number 91 on the Billboard Hot R&B/Hip-Hop Singles & Tracks charts respectively.

== Samples ==
The song contains a sample of "Ironside" by Quincy Jones.

== Music video ==
The music video begins with 2Pac speaking alongside the chorus, and then begins his verse in alternating scenes, first in prison, being followed by a guard (with the rest of Thug Life tagging along right behind 2Pac), followed by a scene of him behind holographic bars (depicting that he's in a cell), and then outside in his neighborhood. Mopreme also does his verse in different scenes in the same order. The Rated R, though, begins behind a scene of him behind holographic bars, and then alternating with that scene and in a prison facility. Macadoshis also began his verse similarly (behind holographic bars), but this time the scene alternates from him speaking from inside prison to the rest of his family from a jail phone and another scene in his neighborhood, as well as the aforementioned scene behind bars. Big Syke begins his verse in the prison work-out room, and alternates between this scene and a scene of him also behind holographic bars. The music video takes one more last scene at the neighborhood, and finally cuts to the ending scene of 2Pac and the rest of Thug Life rejoicing behind the holographic jail cell bars. The music video was released for the week ending on November 13, 1994. It was directed by Ricky Harris.

== Charts ==
=== Weekly charts ===
Chart (1994–1995)	Peak position
US Hot R&B/Hip-Hop Songs (Billboard)	91
US Hot Rap Songs (Billboard)	25

== Track listing ==
- A1. Cradle to the Grave (Moe-Z Radio Version)
- A2. Cradle to the Grave (Moe-Z Clean Version)
- A3. Cradle to the Grave (Moe-Z Album Version)
- A4. Cradle to the Grave (Moe-Z Instrumental)
- B1. Shit Don't Stop (featuring Y?N-Vee)
- B2. Cradle to the Grave (Professor Jay & Syke Version)
- B3. Cradle to the Grave (Madukey Mix)
- B4. Cradle to the Grave (Madukey Mix Instrumental)
