= Pour Out a Little Liquor =

Single by Thug Life

from the album Above the Rim (soundtrack) and Thug Life, Volume I
- Released: August 23, 1994
- Genre: G-funk
- Length: 3:29
- Label: Death Row; Interscope
- Songwriter: Tupac Shakur
- Producer: Johnny "J"

Thug Life singles chronology
"Pour Out a Little Liquor" (1994)	"Cradle to the Grave" (1994)

2Pac singles chronology
"Papa'z Song" (1994)	"Pour Out a Little Liquor" (1994)	"Cradle to the Grave" (1995)

Music video
- "Pour Out a Little Liquor" on YouTube

"Pour Out a Little Liquor" is the debut single by Thug Life from the soundtrack album Above the Rim and their album Thug Life, Volume I. It was written by Tupac Shakur and produced by Johnny "J". It was included on a cassette-only re-issue of the Above the Rim soundtrack in 2021 as part of a celebration of the 30th anniversary of the establishment of Death Row Records.

== Samples ==
The song contains samples of "Cry Together" by The O'Jays, "Impeach the President" by The Honey Drippers, "Welcome to the Ghetto" by Spice 1, and "Jazzie's Groove" by Soul II Soul.

== Music video ==
The music video features a cameo by Yaki Kadafi and Stretch.
