= It Was Written =

Studio album by Nas
- Released: July 2, 1996
- Studios: Soundtrack (New York City, New York); D&D (New York); The Hit Factory (New York); Sony Music (New York); Chung King (New York); Bearsville (Woodstock, New York); Dr. Dre's House (Los Angeles, California); Westlake (Los Angeles)
- Genres: East Coast hip-hop; gangsta rap; mafioso rap
- Length: 58:29
- Label: Columbia
- Producers: DJ Premier; Dr. Dre; Havoc; Rashad Smith; L.E.S.; Live Squad; Trackmasters

Nas chronology
Illmatic (1994)	It Was Written (1996)	The Album (1997)

Singles from It Was Written
- 1. "If I Ruled the World (Imagine That)" Released: June 4, 1996; 2. "Street Dreams" Released: October 22, 1996

It Was Written is the second studio album by American rapper Nas, released on July 2, 1996, by Columbia Records. After the modest commercial success of his debut album Illmatic (1994), Nas pursued a more polished, mainstream sound for It Was Written. Produced largely by Trackmasters, it departed from the debut's raw, underground aesthetic and embraced mafioso and gangsta themes.

The album was a commercial success, selling 270,000 copies in its first week and debuting at number one on the US Billboard 200 chart, while receiving mostly positive reviews. It also heralded Nas's mainstream popularity and contributed to the rise of mafioso rap.

With at least 3 million copies sold, and an estimated 4-5 million total worldwide sales, it has been certified triple platinum, It Was Written remains Nas's best-selling album. In 2024, Billboard named it one of the 100 Greatest Rap Albums of All Time.

== Background and recording ==
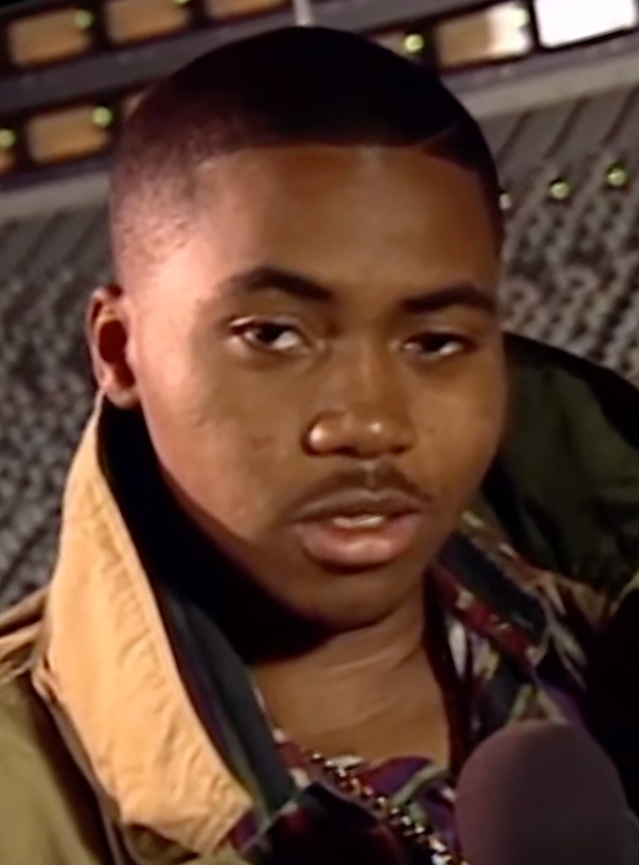
Nas in 1993

Following the critical acclaim of his debut album Illmatic (1994), Nas chose to concentrate his efforts in a more mainstream direction, in contrast to the raw, unpolished and underground tone of his debut. Despite its significant impact on hip hop at the time, Illmatic did not experience the larger sales of most major releases at the time in hip hop, such as Snoop Dogg's Doggystyle (1993). This was due in part to Nas's shy personality and uninvolvement in promoting the record. Nas began to make appearances on other artists' work, including Kool G Rap's "Fast Life" on his album 4, 5, 6 (1995) and Raekwon's "Verbal Intercourse" on his album Only Built 4 Cuban Linx... (1995), which made Nas the first non-Wu-Tang Clan member to appear on one of its solo recordings. He began to dub himself as Nas Escobar on these guest appearances.

Meanwhile, his excessive spending habits left him with little money, and Nas was forced to ask for a loan to purchase clothes to wear to the Source Awards ceremony in 1995. The success of fellow East Coast act The Notorious B.I.G. and promoter Puff Daddy at the awards show sent a message to Nas to change his commercial approach, resulting in his hiring of Steve "The Commissioner" Stoute as manager. While Illmatic attained gold status in the United States, Stoute convinced Nas to aim his efforts in a more mainstream, commercial direction for his second album, after which Nas enlisted the production team Trackmasters, who were known at the time for their mainstream success. Other producers for the album included DJ Premier, Dr. Dre, Havoc of Mobb Deep, L.E.S., Live Squad, and MC Serch as executive producer.

Following the recording, It Was Written was mastered by Tom Coyne at Sterling Sound in New York City. The artist Aimée Macauley designed the album cover, while Danny Clinch took photos for the packaging.

== Music and lyrics ==
"Street Dreams"
The song is an account on the impact of drugs on Nas's neighborhood with an interpolation of the Eurythmics' "Sweet Dreams (Are Made of This)" (1983).

"I Gave You Power"
The song is a first-person narrative by Nas from the perspective of a gun and features a jazz fusion sample.

"If I Ruled the World (Imagine That)"
One of Nas's most acclaimed singles, the track samples Whodini's "Friends" (1984) and features utopian lyrical themes.

In contrast to Illmatic, the album contains a more detailed and elaborate production, while it shares similarity to the G-funk sound, relying heavily on sampled and looped funk grooves. It Was Written has Nas experimenting with a theatrical mafioso concept under the alias of "Nas Escobar" (inspired by the Colombian drug lord Pablo Escobar). The album's subject matter has been noted for its focus on materialistic excess and other mafioso lyrical themes. Jon Pareles of The New York Times wrote of Nas's shift in lyrical themes from Illmatic, stating he "repeatedly cites the Colombian drug kingpin Pablo Escobar and drops brand names of clothes, cars, liquor and guns." Nas also references lines from his previous material, a common element in his music that has been analyzed by one music writer as "return[ing] to his professional beginnings in those references."

The album opens with "Album Intro" in which a slave rebellion is heard, and it contains samples of Sam Cooke's "A Change Is Gonna Come" (1964) and The Lost Generation's "The Sly, the Slick, and the Wicked" (1970). (sample) The opening song "The Message" features production by the Trackmasters, Poke & Tone, and scratching from Kid Capri. One critic described the song as a "bloody narrative", and cited it as "one of the most visually evocative songs of Nas's career". The song's title references the classic hip hop single "The Message" (1982) by Grandmaster Flash and the Furious Five. Legendary producer DJ Premier had one production credit on the jazz fusion-styled "I Gave You Power", a song which depicts a first-person narrative from the perspective of a gun. The song is accompanied by falling piano notes and stuttering drums.

The album contains the singles "If I Ruled the World", which features guest vocals from Lauryn Hill, and "Street Dreams". Music critic J.R. Reynolds wrote that the former has Nas "rapping his way to anarchy in an imagined world where he kicks discipline to the curb and good times rule." In the song, he states that he would "open every cell in Attica/send them to Africa". The latter is an account on the impact of drugs in Nas's neighborhood. The song contains smooth bass lines and frail drums, and it features an interpolation of the Eurythmics' "Sweet Dreams (Are Made of This)" (1983). The album also features guest appearances from Mobb Deep and The Firm, a supergroup which was initially composed of Nas, AZ, Cormega and Foxy Brown. The group makes an appearance on the song "Affirmative Action", a tale of robbery and three characters with mob connections. Brett Berliner of Stylus Magazine described the song's beat as "extremely mafioso, sounding straight out of Goodfellas, with strings and crescendos", while he cited the song as "one of the best posse tracks of all time."

Mobb Deep's Havoc produced two tracks for the album, "The Set Up", a story about revenge, and "Live Nigga Rap", a freestyle performed by Nas and Mobb Deep with hard, gloomy percussion. "Black Girl Lost" is a sympathetic account on the struggle of African-American women. It features vocals by R&B singer Joel "Jo-Jo" Hailey of Jodeci. Music critic Krisex wrote of Nas's lyricism, stating "The L.E.S.-produced song woos heavy rotation while the MC makes the type of passionate perusals that leave lyrical aficionadeos genuflecting at his mike stand." The song's title comes from the book of the same name by pulp writer Donald Goines; his literary work has served as a popular source of reference for many gangsta rap artists. "Nas Is Coming" is a collaboration between Nas and West Coast rapper Dr. Dre. One writer cited it as "more of a gangsta, mainstream tune than anything Nas has ever recorded." The song's opening conversation, a skit, is a discussion between Nas and Dr. Dre about hip hop artists and fans over-concerned with the East Coast–West Coast rivalry, and that the two are producing a song that does not revolve around or contribute to the beef.

== Critical reception ==
Professional ratings
Review scores
Source	Rating
AllMusic	4/5 stars
Chicago Sun-Times	3.5/4 stars
Chicago Tribune	3.5/4 stars
Entertainment Weekly	A−
Los Angeles Times	3.5/4 stars
NME	6/10
Q	4/5 stars
Rolling Stone	2/5 stars
The Rolling Stone Album Guide	4/5 stars
The Source	4/5 stars

It Was Written was generally well-received by critics. Marc Landas of The Source called it an "audio anthology of ghetto stories told by one of hip-hop's most prolific writers." Vibe magazine's Kris Ex criticized the album's "consistently aggressive attempts at pop music", but also wrote that Nas "shines through". Despite calling the album "adequate" and commending Nas for his lyricism and flow, Ex concluded that It Was Written "isn't nearly as satisfying as his first one." NME's Andy Crysell wrote that "Nas's neat, considered lyrics treat the violence that surrounds him with a mixture of remorse, resignation and ebullience." Christopher John Farley of Time stated "The lyrics in It Was Written could be sharper, but the music, energetic and engaging on many tracks, helps drive his message home." Q magazine called Nas's performance "angry, lean and full of drive." Both the Chicago Tribune and Chicago Sun-Times were favorable of the album's sound. Los Angeles Times writer Cheo Hodari Coker called the album "poetic", writing that it "demonstrates a continuing lyrical maturity that makes his already potent beats and rhymes all the more compelling". Spin magazine preferred the "reach" of It Was Written to Nas's "more suavely rapped debut", praised the production, and described the songs' choruses as "grainy, pop-savvy".

The album's release followed the commercial success of other mafioso-themed rap albums with similar subject matter, including Raekwon's Only Built 4 Cuban Linx... (1995), Jay-Z's Reasonable Doubt (1996) and AZ's Doe or Die (1995). Some critics dismissed its mainstream, R&B and pop-leaning sound, as well as the enlistment of a top production unit and popular guest artists. The album's lyrics and themes were also poorly received as an attempt by Nas to follow the popularity of gangsta and mafioso rap. Rolling Stone's Mark Coleman wrote negatively of Nas's themes and called it "the latest blatant example of trashy tough-guy talk", writing "Certainly he strikes a note of creepy realism in his stories of heavyweight dealing and literally cutthroat competition. 'The Set Up', 'Shootouts' and 'Affirmative Action' [...] are chilling in their how-many-grams-to-a-kilo detail and utter amorality. On 'Watch Dem Niggas', Nas cites as inspirations both the boxing coach Cus D'Amato and the murderous drug lord Pablo Escobar. What is this guy thinking?". Jon Pareles of The New York Times commented that he "continually shifts perspective" and called it "late-stage gangsta rap, starting to buckle under its own contradictions." The Village Voice's Robert Christgau gave the album a "neither" rating, indicating an album that "may impress once or twice with consistent craft or an arresting track or two. Then it won't."

The album was ranked number 41 in NME's critics' poll of 1996, and Jim Farber of the New York Daily News named it the sixth best album of 1996. German-based magazine Spex ranked it number four on its "End of Year" list, while the UK-based magazine The Face named it the twenty-fourth best album of 1996. "If I Ruled the World (Imagine That)" was ranked number 29 on NME's Singles of the Year list, and number 20 on The Village Voice's Pazz & Jop critics' poll. It was nominated for a Grammy Award for Best Rap Solo Performance in 1997.

=== Retrospect ===
Leo Stanley of AllMusic later praised Nas's lyricism and ghetto-themed vignettes, along with the album's detailed production. For Stylus Magazine's On Second Thought publication, critic Brett Berliner re-examined the album, discussing its initial impact, and cited it as "one of the first hip-hop albums to straddle the critical and commercial divide successfully." While comparing It Was Written to Illmatic, Berliner stated "It's a seriously good album with a bit of filler, worth of almost all of the praise Illmatic got. This is Nas's second classic, and should be considered one of the best albums of all time." About.com later ranked "If I Ruled the World (Imagine That)" number 24 on its list of 50 Great Hip Hop Songs, while it also named the song the fourth best R&B/Rap Collaboration.

While later reviews of the album were more positive, the subject matter was still criticized. Reviewers found Nas's violent, fantastical mafioso stories to lack the authentic, emotional qualities of his debut album. While Illmatic is often held as Nas's masterpiece, It Was Written deemed a case of the sophomore slump and the first of his subsequent work to be scrutinized in comparison to the former. However, It Was Written was also viewed as his commercial breakthrough, enhancing the rapper's image in the mainstream and attracting a much larger fanbase. In contrast to the popular consensus, rappers Royce da 5'9" and Schoolboy Q have opined that It Was Written is superior to Illmatic.

== Commercial performance ==
It Was Written was released on July 2, 1996, selling 270,000 copies in its first week. It peaked at number one on the Top R&B/Hip-Hop Albums and debuted at the top of the Billboard 200, remaining on the latter chart at number one for four consecutive weeks, in the top 20 for eleven weeks, and a total of thirty-four weeks in the top 200.

The album's first single "If I Ruled the World (Imagine That)" peaked at No. 15 on the Hot Rap Singles chart, No. 17 on the Hot R&B/Hip-Hop Singles & Tracks chart and No. 53 on the Billboard Hot 100 singles chart. The second single "Street Dreams" hit No. 1 on the Hot Dance Music/Maxi-Singles Sales chart, as well as No. 1 on the Hot Rap Singles chart, while it peaked at No. 18 on the Hot R&B/Hip-Hop Singles & Tracks and No. 27 on the Billboard Hot 100. On September 6, 1996, It Was Written was certified double platinum by the Recording Industry Association of America (RIAA), for shipments of 2 million copies in the United States. On January 8, 1997, "Street Dreams" was certified Gold in sales by the RIAA for shipments of 500,000 copies.

It Was Written remains Nas's best-selling album. On September 6, 1996, the album was certified 2× platinum, selling over 2 million copies. In 2001, it had reached sales of more than 2.13 million copies. By 2014, the album had sold 2,595,000. On June 24, 2021, it was certified triple platinum by the RIAA.

== Aftermath and legacy ==
"Nas is Coming" began a brief collaboration between Nas and West Coast hip hop producer Dr. Dre. The alliance also resulted in the formation of The Firm, Nas's short-lived supergroup, which comprised rappers Foxy Brown, AZ, and Cormega, who make their debut on track number eight, "Affirmative Action". The pairing of the East Coast rapper and the West Coast producer, during the period of the East Coast–West Coast hip hop rivalry, brought criticism from both sides.

In addition, West Coast-based rapper Tupac Shakur took offense to the opening line of the song "The Message", and in retaliation insulted Nas on a song titled "Against All Odds" from his posthumously released album The Don Killuminati: The 7 Day Theory (1996). In an interview for King magazine, Nas later confirmed that the song was intended as a diss towards The Notorious B.I.G., with the line "There's one life, one love, so there can only be one King." Nas and Shakur eventually met and reconciled prior to the latter's fatal shooting. As a result of his death, Shakur did not have the opportunity to remove the insults to Nas in "Against All Odds" on The 7 Day Theory.

=== Influence ===
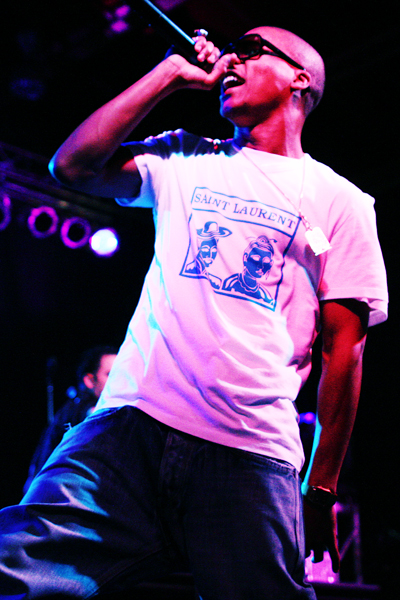
Rapper Lupe Fiasco has cited It Was Written as his favorite hip hop album and his primary source of inspiration.

It Was Written has been credited, along with Raekwon's Only Built 4 Cuban Linx… (1995), with helping usher in the era of mafioso rap. According to writer Sam Chennault, while the hip hop subgenre would "run out of steam quickly, this release is a gem." Chennault also discussed the significance of It Was Written during the period of its release, stating "after mastering stark street corner realism on Illmatic, Nas delivered a loose concept album that was, at the time, groundbreaking in its scope, approach and execution." According to rapper Young Noble, a close friend of Tupac Shakur, the song "I Gave You Power" served as the main inspiration for Shakur's "Me and My Girlfriend" (1996). American hip hop artist Lupe Fiasco has cited It Was Written as his favorite album and his primary source of inspiration. Fiasco has stated that he based his debut album Food & Liquor (2006) on the conceptual style and "moods" of It Was Written. When asked of his musical influences in an interview with AllHipHop.com, Fiasco stated "You know I really tried to go back and recreate [Nas'] It Was Written, you know what I'm saying like that? [I would play] It Was Written and then I would play my album, and it was like, 'Do we got [this] record, do we got that record?'" He went on to explain the album's influence on him:

Cause it's a classic. Like, people study—you study the masters, you know what I'm saying? Everybody that's rapping studied someone to learn how to rap. They had a rapper who was they favorite rapper that they wanted to be like and wanted to rap like, know what I'm saying? For me, I just look at it like I studied a masterpiece. I modeled my album after a masterpiece; and not song for song; not line for line; not beat for beat. It was more—for me it was like mood for mood. The way he set the mood on that album to me was just like incredible. And at the time in my life—like, I fell in love with It Was Written when I was seventeen, eighteen—a very impressionable time—so I was like I love that album. That's my favorite Hip Hop album, so it's like why not base your album on It Was Written?

American reggae and hip hop artist Matisyahu regards It Was Written as one of his influences as well. He cites the introduction of It Was Written, in which slaves rebel against their owner, as having a major influence on him. According to The Washington Post, "Matisyahu, too, felt enslaved. By what? He didn't know. Just felt the chains. The lyrics rocked him. The beat did, too." Matisyahu stated that after listening to It Was Written, "I connected with hip-hop, the hardness of it, the driving beat. It's music with space, that has gaps in every little thing that happens."

American rapper Cordae has also referenced the album as a big influence to his musical career. Danny Brown claimed to have quit his job in order to stay home and listen to It Was Written, inspiring him to pursue rapping full time.

=== Subsequent work by Nas ===
While It Was Written earned more positive notices from critics over time, its standing also suffered from comparisons to the acclaimed Illmatic. Nas's subsequent releases have continued to be weighed against his debut, despite all of them selling more copies. Against this standard, they have often been critically deemed as mediocre follow-ups. It Was Written was the first of Nas's albums to have been labeled as 'selling out' by fans of Illmatic, due to his crossover sensibilities and radio-friendly hits aimed at the pop charts. In addition, none of his following releases have been able to reach the sales success of It Was Written. The follow-up, I Am... (1999), fared almost as well as It Was Written, serving as Nas's only other album to reach double platinum status. After the releases of I Am... and Nastradamus (1999), which underwent considerable editing due to bootlegging of the recording sessions, many fans and critics feared that his career was deteriorating. Despite the chart-topping success of I Am..., hip hop audiences were not ready for the more prophetic themes of Nastradamus, as it only sold 232,000 copies by its first week (less than half of I Am...'s first-week figures).

By 2001, Illmatic and It Was Written were both selling at a rate of over 3,000 copies a week, while Nastradamus was earning an average of little more than 2,000 copies a week, despite its relative newness. Both I Am... and Nastradamus received further criticism for their commercially oriented sound. Reflecting this widespread perception in the hip hop community and adding to his ongoing feud with Jay-Z at the time, Jay-Z mocked him in the song "Takeover" (2001) for assuming a "Pablo Escobar" persona and having a "one hot album [Illmatic] every ten year average". Nas, however, made something of a comeback with his fifth album Stillmatic (2001) and the follow-up God's Son (2002), which both sold in excess of 1 million copies. Afterwards, his subsequent albums tended to receive more positive reviews, including the platinum-selling Street's Disciple (2004) and his untitled ninth album (2008).

== Track listing ==
Information is taken from the album's liner notes.

No.	Title	Writer(s)	Producer(s)	Length
1.	"Album Intro"	Nasir Jones	Nas; Trackmasters	2:24
2.	"The Message"	Jones; Samuel Barnes	Trackmasters	3:54
3.	"Street Dreams"	Jones; Barnes; Annie Lennox; David A. Stewart	Trackmasters	4:39
4.	"I Gave You Power"	Jones; Christopher Martin	DJ Premier	3:52
5.	"Watch Dem Niggas" (featuring Foxy Brown)	Jones; Barnes	Trackmasters	4:04
6.	"Take It in Blood"	Jones; Randy Walker; Cleveland Horne; Joseph Pruitt; James Epps, Jr.; Wallace Childs	Live Squad; Lo Ground & Top General Sounds	4:48
7.	"Nas Is Coming" (featuring Dr. Dre)	Jones; Andre Young	Dr. Dre	5:41
8.	"Affirmative Action" (featuring The Firm)	Jones; Anthony Cruz; Cory McKay; Inga Marchand; Jean-Claude Olivier; Barnes	Dave Atkinson; Trackmasters	4:19
9.	"The Set Up" (featuring Havoc)	Jones; Kejuan Muchita	Havoc	4:01
10.	"Black Girl Lost" (featuring Joel "JoJo" Hailey)	Jones; LeShan Lewis; James Mtume; Reggie Lucas	L.E.S.; Trackmasters	4:23
11.	"Suspect"	Jones; Lewis	L.E.S.	4:12
12.	"Shootouts"	Jones; Olivier; Richard Pimente	Trackmasters; Kirk Goddy (Kurt Gowdy)	3:46
13.	"Live Nigga Rap" (featuring Mobb Deep)	Jones; Muchita	Havoc	3:45
14.	"If I Ruled the World (Imagine That)" (featuring Lauryn Hill)	Jones; Olivier; Kurtis Walker	Trackmasters; Rashad Smith	4:42

Cassette bonus track
No.	Title	Writer(s)	Producer(s)	Length
15.	"Silent Murder"	Nasir Jones; Romeo; Browne	Live Squad	3:24

25th anniversary expanded edition bonus tracks
No.	Title	Writer(s)	Producer(s)	Length
15.	"Silent Murder"	Nasir Jones; Romeo; Browne	Live Squad	3:24
16.	"Street Dreams" (bonus verse)	Jones; Barnes; Annie Lennox; David A. Stewart	Trackmasters	4:08

Sample credits

- "Album Intro" contains samples from "A Change Is Gonna Come", performed by Sam Cooke, and "The Sly, Slick, and the Wicked", performed by The Lost Generation.
- "The Message" contains samples from "Shape of My Heart", performed by Sting, "Impeach the President", performed by The Honey Drippers, and "Halftime" and "N.Y. State of Mind", both performed by Nas.
- "Street Dreams" contains a sample of "Never Gonna Stop", performed by Linda Clifford, and an interpolation of "Sweet Dreams (Are Made of This)", performed by Eurythmics.
- "I Gave You Power" contains a sample of "Theme Bahamas", performed by Ahmad Jamal.
- "Watch Dem..." contains a sample of "The Sponge", performed by Bob James and Earl Klugh.
- "Take It in Blood" contains samples from "Mixed Up Moods and Attitudes", performed by The Fantastic Four, "Ease Back", performed by Ultramagnetic MC's, and "Action", performed by Orange Krush.
- "Nas Is Coming" contains a sample of "Synopsis Two: Mother's Day", performed by The 24-Carat Black.
- "Black Girl Lost" contains a sample of "Starlight", performed by Stephanie Mills.
- "Suspect" contains samples from "El Gato Triste", performed by Chuck Mangione, and "Kitty With the Bent Frame", performed by Quincy Jones.
- "Shootouts" contains samples from "I Wish You Were Here", performed by Al Green.
- "If I Ruled the World (Imagine That)" contains a sample of "Friends", performed by Whodini, and interpolations from "If I Ruled the World", performed by Kurtis Blow, and "Walk Right Up to the Sun", performed by The Delfonics.

== Personnel ==
Credits are taken from the liner notes.

- Dave Atkinson – keyboards, producer
- AZ – vocals
- Foxy Brown – vocals
- Danny Clinch – photography
- Cormega – vocals
- Tom Coyne – mastering
- Delight – keyboards
- DJ Kid Capri – scratching
- DJ Premier – producer
- Dr. Dre – producer, vocals
- Bill Esses – mixing
- Mike Fronda – mixing
- Kirk Goddy – producer
- Joel "JoJo" Hailey – vocals
- Havoc – producer
- Lauryn Hill – vocals
- Ken "Duro" Ifill – vocals, mixing
- L.E.S. – producer
- Live Squad – producer
- Aimee MacAuley – art direction, design
- Nas – vocals, producer, exec.
- J. Parker – vocals
- Poke & Tone – producer, mixing
- Kelston Rice – engineer
- Eddie Sancho – engineer
- Rashad Smith – producer
- Steve Stoute – exec. producer, management
- Trackmasters – producer, exec. producer
- Richard Travali – mixing
- Kurt Walker – vocals

== Charts ==
=== Weekly charts ===
Chart performance for It Was Written
Chart (1996)	Peak position
Austrian Albums (Ö3 Austria)	38
Belgian Albums (Ultratop Flanders)	36
Belgian Albums (Ultratop Wallonia)	26
Canada Top Albums/CDs (RPM)	8
Dutch Albums (Album Top 100)	16
Finnish Albums (Suomen virallinen lista)	35
French Albums (SNEP)	7
German Albums (Offizielle Top 100)	16
New Zealand Albums (RMNZ)	25
Norwegian Albums (VG-lista)	10
Swedish Albums (Sverigetopplistan)	3
Swiss Albums (Schweizer Hitparade)	25
UK Albums (Official Charts)	38
US Billboard 200	1
US Top R&B/Hip-Hop Albums (Billboard)	1

=== Year-end charts ===
Chart (1996)	Position
French Albums (SNEP)	36
German Albums (Offizielle Top 100)	76
US Billboard 200	30
US Top R&B/Hip-Hop Albums (Billboard)	5

== Certifications ==
Region	Certification	Certified units/sales
Canada (Music Canada)	Platinum	100,000^{^}
Denmark (IFPI Danmark)	Gold	10,000^{‡}
France (SNEP)	Gold	100,000^{*}
United Kingdom (BPI)	Gold	100,000^{^}
United States (RIAA)	3× Platinum	3,000,000^{‡}
^{*} Sales figures based on certification alone.^{^} Shipments figures based on certification alone.^{‡} Sales+streaming figures based on certification alone.

== See also ==
- List of number-one albums of 1996 (U.S.)
- List of number-one R&B albums of 1996 (U.S.)
- Sophomore slump

== Bibliography ==
- John Borgmeyer, Holly Lang (2006). Dr. Dre: A Biography. Edition: illustrated. Greenwood Publishing Group. ISBN 0-313-33826-4.
- Jake Brown (2006). Dr. Dre in the Studio. Edition: illustrated. Amber Books Publishing. ISBN 0-9767735-5-4.
- Mickey Hess (2007). Ego Trip's Book of Rap Lists. Greenwood Press. ISBN 978-0-313-33902-8.
- Mickey Hess (2007). Icons of Hip Hop: An Encyclopedia of the Movement, Music, and Culture. Edition: illustrated. Greenwood Publishing Group. ISBN 978-0-313-33904-2.
- Todd Boyd (2004). The New H.N.I.C.: The Death of Civil Rights and the Reign of Hip Hop. NYU Press. ISBN 0-8147-9896-9.
- Nathan Brackett, Christian Hoard (2004). The New Rolling Stone Album Guide: Completely Revised and Updated 4th Edition. Simon and Schuster. ISBN 0-7432-0169-8.
