= Whoreson =

The term Whoreson can refer to

- Bastard (law of England and Wales) - bastardy law in England
- Whoreson - a 1972 novel by Donald Goines
