= Bury Me a G =

Bury Me a G can refer to:

- A song by Thug Life from the album Thug Life, Volume I
- A single by Young Jeezy from the album The Inspiration
