= Welcome to the Ghetto =

Single by Spice 1

from the album Spice 1
- Released: June 12, 1992
- Recorded: 1991
- Genre: Hardcore hip hop; conscious hip hop
- Length: 4:09
- Label: Jive Records
- Songwriter(s): Robert Green, Jr.
- Producer(s): Spice 1

"Welcome to the Ghetto" is a 1992 single by Spice 1. The lyrics depict the everyday struggles of ghetto life such as black-on-black crime, constant death, drugs, gun violence, and gangs. The song made it to two Billboard charts, peaking at #39 on the Hot R&B/Hip Hop Singles & Tracks chart and #5 on the Hot Rap Singles chart. The song would later influence 2Pac's song "I Wonder If Heaven Got a Ghetto" as that song's title is directly named after a line from the first verse of this song. A music video was released for the song and the video version included an extra third verse that was not heard in the regular album version. The song samples Marvin Gaye's "Inner City Blues (Make Me Wanna Holler)" and The S.O.S. Band's "No One's Gonna Love You". The song is one of Spice's best-known songs. A sequel song, entitled "Welcome Back to the Ghetto", was later recorded by Spice 1 in 2002 for his album Spiceberg Slim. 2Pac would later sample the first song from Spice 1's line on the track "Pour Out a Little Liquor" with Thug Life, which first appeared on the soundtrack to the 1994 basketball film Above the Rim and later included on the album Thug Life: Volume 1.
