= Daddy Cool =

Daddy Cool may refer to:

== Music ==
- Daddy Cool (band), a 1970s Australian rock band, reformed 2005
- "Daddy Cool" (The Rays song), a 1957 song by US doo-wop group The Rays, also covered by Drummond and Darts
- "Daddy Cool" (Boney M. song), a 1976 hit single by Boney M.
- Daddy Cool (musical), a 2006 musical featuring the music of Boney M and other Frank Farian productions

== Film ==
- Daddy Cool (2009 Malayalam film), a 2009 Indian Malayalam-language film
- Daddy Cool (2009 Hindi film), a 2009 Indian Hindi-language comedy film

== Other uses ==
- Daddy Cool (novel), a 1974 book by Donald Goines

== See also ==
- Daddy Cool Munde Fool, 2013 Indian Punjabi-language comedy film
