= Cry Revenge =

1974 novel by Donald Goines

- Author: Donald Goines
- Language: English
- Publisher: Holloway House
- Publication date: 1974

Cry Revenge is a 1974 novel by Donald Goines. It is part of the Kenyatta series. It tells the story of a young black man named Curtis Carson.

== Plot ==
Carson plans to graduate from running small-time craps games in his back yard to partnering with his friend Dan to become a drug dealer. His potential supplier is a Mexican man known as Fat George. Curtis and Dan hustle money from a Mexican named Pedro via a crap game and approach Fat George about setting up shop. Fat George dislikes Dan and refuses to do business with him so Curtis goes into business alone. Dan is a drug user and Carson thinks he would likely only manage to sell enough to keep up with his own habit.

Curtis meets a Mexican woman named Shirley and moves in with her. Dan comes running into a bar one day and tells Fat George and Curtis that two men are coming to rob them when the two men actually work for the police. As they run in, Pedro's older brother the bartender pulls out a shotgun and kills both men, though he dies in the process.

Pedro blames Dan for his brother's death and goes looking for him. When Pedro runs into Curtis's younger brother, a high school basketball star, he asks him where Dan is. When the brother fails to answer, he is tortured and shot in the back, leaving him paralyzed. Curtis kills Pedro's sister in retaliation. Pedro and his surviving brother plan to kill Curtis after killing Fat George, who they view as being a friend to the blacks.

A shootout at Fat George's apartment leaves several corpses and when Curtis hears that the people after him are dead, he decides the only loose end is Dan, whom he blames for his brother's situation. He tracks Dan down to an abandoned building, but Dan stabs Curtis in the back while sliding in under some boards, leaving Curtis paralyzed like his younger brother. The novel ends when Curtis shoots and kills Dan, falling in and out of consciousness, while rats begin to eat both his and Dan's bodies.
