= Eldorado Red =

- First edition (publ. Holloway House)
- Author: Donald Goines
- Language: English
- Publisher: Holloway House
- Publication date: 1974

Eldorado Red is a 1974 crime novel by Donald Goines that tells the story of a numbers runner in Detroit who goes by the name Eldorado Red (due to the color and make of his car).

== Plot ==
ElDorado Red has a son named Buddy and trusts him in cleaning up the collection houses. Though Eldorado Red has been a supportive father and has paid adequate child support, Buddy's mother, who left Eldorado Red for a pimp, tells Buddy that all five of her children have been fathered by Eldorado Red and that he refuses to support any of them. With revenge in mind, Buddy, with the assistance of three friends (Tubby, Samson and Danny) robs two of the collection spots. Eldorado Red orders two hit men (Tank and Copper-Head) to investigate and ‘take care of’ the thieves. When Eldorado Red learns one of the thieves was his own son, he tells the two hit men to let him go after having killed the rest, but it is too late because Samson has already shot and killed Buddy. The hit men are picked up by police in Buddy's powder blue Cadillac, though Tank gets off after having Eldorado Red take care of a drug dealer named Reno who was the only witness that could tie Tank to the killings.
