= Tupac: Assassination =

2007 documentary film

- Directed by: Richard Bond
- Written by: R. J. Bond; Russell Poole (Part III); Michael Carlin (Part III)
- Produced by: Frank Alexander and Richard Bond
- Starring: Tupac Shakur
- Cinematography: Ric Hine; Jara Harris; Michael Carlin; R. J. Bond
- Edited by: Richard Bond
- Music by: Edward "3rDegree" Williams; Various Artists
- Distributed by: Universal Home Video; Mill Creek Video; Cinedigm (New Video); MVD Entertainment
- Release date: October 23, 2007
- Running time: 88 minutes (Part I); 92 Minutes (Part II); 150 Minutes (Part III)
- Country: United States
- Language: English

Tupac Assassination: Conspiracy or Revenge is a documentary film about the unsolved murder of rapper Tupac Shakur produced by Frank Alexander, a Shakur bodyguard who was with the rapper at the time of the shooting, produced and directed by Richard Bond.

== Storyline ==
The film is a series of interviews with key players and witnesses, as well as what the producer told Rolling Stone magazine were experts in the fields of law enforcement and rap.

Suge Knight owed artists over $104 million and Shakur was threatening to take his masters and leave Death Row after the last album, The Don Killuminati: The 7 Day Theory.

According to former bodyguards who heard this altercation between Tupac Shakur and Suge Knight, they did not realize at the time what Reggie Wright Jr. was planning even when he was demanding that all bodyguards leave their weapons, now reassigning normal Tupac bodyguards elsewhere (leaving Tupac with only Frank) and taking their communication devices, although this is contradicted by bodyguard Frank Alexander's previous statements that he did have his gun in his car. However, Alexander was not driving his own car that night. He had left his vehicle in the MGM parking lot. According to Alexander, Tupac asked Alexander to drive the "lil homeez in Kidada Jones' car which reportedly was about to run out of gas, Alexander indicating that the gas gauge needle was on empty, and that in retrospect, he was indeed surprised that car did not run out of gas.

Bodyguard Michael Moore refused to give up his weapon and said on film that it was Kevin Hackie (former Compton PD) who had his cell that night. However, in Alexander's book, Alexander said the bodyguards were told not to have their guns only at Club 662 in fear the authorities might shut the club down, but he was told they could have their guns in their hotel rooms or cars.

Alexander said in an interview with HitEmUp.com in January 2002, "We were told to either leave them in our room or leave them in our car. And me, knowing I was going to the club, stuck my gun in my car up under the seat 'cause that's where I was gonna go and park my car in the front."

"I think they removed me [from guarding Tupac] because I wouldn't let them take away my weapon", Moore said about why on the day of Tupac's murder he was reassigned to Club 662. "I told Tupac...and walked him to his room. I didn't want to leave him (I was the only one with a weapon) and at first I was going to stay, but the club kept calling me. I said, 'its 8 p.m. and I'm not due until 11 p.m. don't call me no more. Then Reggie [head of Wrightway Protective Services] called, so I went."

In the film, Michael Moore expressed his frustration at the time, saying, "Why would I leave my weapon and I'm guarding the biggest rapper in the world.' I said, 'I'm not taking my weapon away for no one!"

Shortly after bodyguard Moore left Tupac in the Vegas hotel, Tupac got into a car driven by Suge Knight (which they said he never does) and while waiting at a light (boxed in at the left by Trevon Lane, boxed in the back by Frank's car and to the right by the killers car) the killer(s) shot him. But to his surprise he was still alive.

== Cast ==
The cast includes Cathy Scott, author of The Killing of Tupac Shakur, Mopreme Shakur, Tupac's stepbrother, bodyguard Michael Moore, Brent Becker, a Las Vegas police detective, and Donald Erath Jr., a Los Angeles Police Department investigator.

== Post-release ==
=== Press screening controversy ===
A. Reggie Wright also told AllHipHop.com, "The reason 'Pac is dead is because Frank Alexander, the guy who wrote and produced this new DVD failed to bodyguard 'Pac properly on the night he was shot." "Kevin [Hackie] and Frank [Alexander] ought to be ashamed of themselves. The truth is these guys had almost nothing to do with 'Pac's life, but they never cease to come up with new ways to exploit his death for profit or fame."

=== Legal issues surrounding distribution ===
In early 2008, the producers sued the label Eyecon Enterprises for non-payment of royalties. Eyecon had secured $75,000 in advances from Liberation Entertainment before the movie was released and never told the producers. Eyecon and its founder Stephanie "Bright" Riley also took $135,000 from Philadelphia Phillies Shortstop Jimmy Rollins for what he was told was "production costs" related to Tupac Assassination. Rollins received a $200,000 court judgment against Riley and Eyecon and the distribution agreement was voided by the court. The case was settled out of court for an undisclosed sum. Camelot Entertainment and Incentive Capital released assumed claims of movie license. However the producers of the movie still maintain copyright and currently have a digital distribution deal with Cinedigm, formerly New Video.

=== Versions and Releases of Movie ===
"Tupac Assassination: Conspiracy or Revenge" was released October 27, 2007. It was a "no frills" DVD release. It was not released digitally. It was released through Fontana/Universal under the Eyecon Enterprises label.

"Tupac Assassination: Conspiracy or Revenge" (Platinum Edition) was a 25,000 copy release created exclusively for the Walmart chain on or about March 13, 2008. It was composed of two discs: Disc 1 was the feature and Disc 2 had three "bonus features"; a) the Kevin Hackie Interview, b) the Mopreme Shakur Interview and c) the Assassination I screening in Los Angeles Q and A session. All of Disc two was produced and collated by Eyecon Enterprises, our distributor and we had no say in the production of that content whatsoever. The masters of the interviews were turned over in a lawsuit settlement with Eyecon, over unpaid royalties.

"Tupac Assassination: Conspiracy or Revenge" (Deluxe Edition) was a planned release by Eyecon/Fontana/Universal that was advertised but aborted before its run due to the pending litigation between Frank and RJ and Eyecon/Fontana/Universal

"Tupac Assassination II: Reckoning" was released January 27, 2009 by Mill Creek Entertainment. Because of the lawsuit filed against Eyecon Enterprises by Step N' Up and RJ Bond, prohibited Fontana and Universal (co-defendants) the right to distribute the movie. "Reckoning" was produced very quickly with two driving concerns: First, there was concern that "Tupac Assassination I" was going to be tied up in litigation with Eyecon and removed from distribution. Too much work and information was put out to the public to risk its removal, lest certain opposing parties (deferential to the politics of the "Assassination" movie) trumpet the removal as a "sign" that it was the message, not the distribution issues, that cause the disappearance of the first movie. "Assassination II" was never originally released as a single release. It was released by Mill Creek in a double "boxed set" with a slightly modified version of "Tupac Assassination: Conspiracy or Revenge" (Known for legal reasons as the "Director's Cut" of part one.)

Where "Tupac Assassination: Conspiracy or Revenge" gave a sniper sight into witnesses into the Shakur murder never interviewed by Las Vegas Police and a guide to a "by the moment" look the mechanics of the Shakur killing, "Tupac Assassination II: Reckoning" stopped to consider the human impact of the loss of the rapper to his closest family and friends. Those who care to know will learn that less than 25% of "Reckoning" was "recycled" (or re-used to bring the audience who had not seen "TA: I" enough information to restate the beliefs of the first movie to understand the context of the interviews of Part II. Tupac's former manager Leila Steinberg, Tupac business partner and video producer Tracy Robinson and Tupac's aunt Gloria Cox (who rarely give interviews of any kind to the media) were interviewed by the production team. Additional interviews with Frank Alexander were shot at the Tupac Amaru Shakur Foundation with the blessing of the Shakur Estate- a claim no other Tupac Documentary can assert. Again, it is about collecting relevant interviews with reach to those who matter. This has always been the hallmark of the "Assassination" movies. With original music ("Crooked") and an expanded look at the Las Vegas Police and City Corruption, "Reckoning" is a standalone piece in the series.

It was intended by Frank and RJ that "Reckoning" was to be released as a single by Mill Creek, and by 2010 it had only been a part of the "two pack" released by Mill Creek. Worse, Mill Creek as the production teams newly selected distributor, was convinced that a lower price/high volume sales plan for the set of movies was the right move. They got it half right. The "lower price" version was also manufactured in a cheap video transfer process, with broken packaging and scratched disks, which hampered the brand quality. The framing of the transfer was incorrect (where words literally ran off the screen for example) and the production team's concern was that "Reckoning" would suffer the same fate as a single film. A negotiated exit from Mill Creek allowed the production team to retain their masters and find a new home, but also allowed Mill Creek to "sell off" the other 30,000 copies of the inferior product at a wholesale rate. As a result, there are Mill Creek double sets on eBay for 1 and 2 dollars. However, collectors will note that the Mill Creek "Reckoning" has a unique trait no other Assassination film has; the Mill Creek release has footage removed from later versions of "Reckoning"; there were about 20 minutes of Tupac behind the scenes footage from "Hit 'Em Up" and other b-roll of Tupac that were cut out of later versions of the movie over a controversy that spring up (again) this time between Gobi Rahimi (Tupac's photographer and videographer behind the scenes) and Tracy Robinson over who had the legal right to license the footage used in the movie. In settling the dispute, the footage was edited out and replaced, never to appear again in later versions of the movie.

"Tupac Assassination" 3 Disc (Autographed) Set was a limited set of the Mill creek DVDs that were from RJ Bond's personal stock. They were numbered and released January 27, 2009 by RJ Bond for Christmas 2009. The third disc was the raw footage of the never-before-seen Shakur Riker's Island Prison Interview (with Timecode). This footage was given to the production team but legal clearance to incorporate the footage into the Assassination II movie was problematic. Instead the third disc was given as a bonus along with a Certificate of authenticity, and sold exclusively through eBay.

"Tupac: Conspiracy" and "Tupac: Aftermath" were released in the summer of 2013 by MVD Home Entertainment. "Tupac: Conspiracy" was a re-edit and reconstruction of "Tupac Assassination: Conspiracy or Revenge"; some interview footage was removed and replaced, to continue to be true to the continued flow of new information that was coming in, as well as recreation footage with Frank Alexander (and actor Josh Harroway as Tupac). "Tupac: Aftermath" was a much less altered cut of "Tupac Assassination II: Reckoning" than the "Conspiracy" cut. But some re-framing of titles and redesigned "explainer cards" gave the movie a fresh look. Both titles were supervised in the fall of 2012 and re-edited while RJ Bond was completing post production of the movie "Static" (An unreleased and aborted Digital Underground Project) and had practically completed locking the pictures by the time of Frank Alexander's death in April 2013. This was the last major re-edit for either of the first two movies.

"Tupac Assassination III: Battle for Compton" was released in March 2017.

To be clear, the majority of the changes to the pictures themselves came as new information was learned. However, a viewing of the 2007 release of "Tupac Assassination I" and a viewing of "Tupac: Conspiracy" will clearly evidence that little to no story elements were changed and the underlying themes have remained. Even less so for "Tupac Assassination II" and "Tupac: Aftermath."

The producers of the films RJ Bond and Frank Alexander, and recently Michael Douglas Carlin have never strayed from their original formula and theory about how Shakur was killed. Assassination III has less than 20 minutes from the other two movies out of a total running time of 144 minutes; hardly a repeat. "Battle for Compton is unique to the franchise because it is the only one of the three movies (Part II alluded to elements of the Wallace case but never investigated it) that deals with the Wallace killing in the context of the Shakur killing.

The only divergent path taken by the producers over 10 years of interviews and filmmaking, has to do with the involvement and role of one player, Marion "Suge Knight" and his involvement of the Vegas Shakur killing. "Battle for Compton" is silent on the role of Knight in the Wallace killing, and in fact poses the possibility that Knight may or may not have been involved with the Wallace killing. In this, the filmmakers have room to account for both their belief that Knight was an intended target in Vegas AND the possibility that Knight gave the order to kill Christopher Wallace. In fact, that possibility is actually enhanced when incorporated with the "Assassination" position that Knight was being influenced by a false narrative that involved the East Coast and rival gangs. It is entirely compatible that Knight could have been a target in Las Vegas and that he could have ordered the hit on Wallace.

== Sequel ==
Tupac: Assassination II: Reckoning was released on January 27, 2009. The film features Gloria Cox, Shakur's Aunt, Leila Steinberg, Shakur's manager, and Tracey Robinson, his video producer. Tupac: Assassination III: Battle for Compton was released on March 10, 2017.
