= Dopefiend =

1971 novel by Donald Goines

Dopefiend: The Story of a Black Junkie
- Author: Donald Goines
- Language: English
- Publication date: 1971

Dopefiend: The Story of a Black Junkie is a 1971 novel by Donald Goines and his first published novel. The book is considered to be Goines's benchmark novel and shares some similarities to the author's life. The book deals with "the power dynamics between dealer and junkie and illustrates how a perverted, cowardly, black drug dealer in a dilapidated ghetto house can exert his influence across socioeconomic boundaries over anyone who becomes addicted to heroin. Goines emphasizes that no heroin user can emerge from the experience unscathed."

The novel was written while Goines was incarcerated and was written after his book Whoreson was accepted by Holloway House's editors, but was published first.

== Plot ==
Dopefiend features an ensemble cast of characters. The central antagonist is named Porky, a drug dealer who seeks to exploit the weaknesses of others and enjoys humiliating people, especially women, whom he sometimes forces to copulate with his German Shepherds in order to score some drugs when they do not have the funds to pay for them. Terry and Teddy are a young couple whose relationship is destroyed by drugs. Terry does not use initially, but is given free drugs by Porky as he hopes to get her addicted so that he might be able to force her to have sex with him, eventually she becomes addicted as her boyfriend Teddy already was. Teddy resorts to stealing with friends to supply his habit, while Terry, under the guidance of a pregnant heroin addict named Minnie, turns to prostitution. Teddy watches two friends get shot down by some security guards and he himself is killed after he and two other dope fiends rob Porky. Minnie, after performing a sexual act with Porky's dogs to cover the cost of her addiction, drops the drugs down a sewer. She then commits suicide by hanging herself. Terry walks in on her dangling from the ceiling where the head of her stillborn child is seen coming out from between her legs, as she twists back and forth over a pile of excrement on the floor. The shock of this is too much for Terry to handle, and she ends up in a mental institution. The novel ends with Porky scouting another young couple as he once did with Terry and Teddy; it is revealed that Porky had never done drugs a day in his life.

== Reception ==
MELUS writer Greg Goode covered the book in his 1984 article From Dopefiend to Kenyatta's Last Hit: The Angry Black Crime Novels of Donald Goines, writing that "To read Goines's description is to imagine a bloody, pustulant cross between a pharmacy, an operating room and a torture chamber, where sick junkies frantically stab themselves with rusty, clogged needles trying to hit a track."
