= Let It Be Known =

EP by Spice 1
- Released: 1991
- Recorded: 1988–1991
- Genres: West Coast hip hop; gangsta rap; golden age hip hop
- Length: 26:39
- Label: Triad Records
- Producers: Ant Banks, Georgette Willis (exec.)

Spice 1 chronology
Let It Be Known (1991)	Spice 1 (1992)

Professional ratings
Review scores
Source	Rating
Allmusic	2/5 stars

Let It Be Known is a seven track EP by American rapper Spice 1. It peaked at number 69 on the Billboard Top R&B/Hip-Hop Albums. The album was produced entirely by Ant Banks.

== Track listing ==
1. "Ghetto Thang"
2. "Let It Be Known"
3. "187 Proof (Part 1)"
4. "1-900-S.P.I.C.E."
5. "In My Neighborhood"
6. "Break Yourself" (featuring MC Ant)
7. "City Streets"

== Chart history ==
Chart (1991)	Peak position
U.S. Billboard Top R&B/Hip-Hop Albums	69
