= Strictly 4 My N.I.G.G.A.Z... =

Studio album by 2Pac
- Released: February 16, 1993
- Recorded: 1992
- Studios: Starlight Sound (Richmond, CA); Echo Sound (Los Angeles, CA); Unique Recording (New York, NY)
- Genres: Hardcore hip-hop; conscious hip-hop; political hip-hop
- Length: 64:05
- Labels: TNT; Interscope; Atlantic
- Producers: Atron Gregory (exec.); Akshun; Big D the Impossible; DJ Bobcat; Digital Underground; Laylaw; Live Squad; Special Ed; Truman Jefferson

2Pac chronology
2Pacalypse Now (1991)	Strictly 4 My N.I.G.G.A.Z... (1993)	Thug Life, Volume I (1994)

Singles from Strictly 4 My N.I.G.G.A.Z...
- 1. "Holler If Ya Hear Me" Released: February 4, 1993; 2. "I Get Around" Released: June 10, 1993; 3. "Keep Ya Head Up" Released: October 28, 1993; 4. "Papa'z Song" Released: January 17, 1994

Strictly 4 My N.I.G.G.A.Z... is the second solo studio album by American rapper 2Pac. It was released on February 16, 1993, by TNT Recordings, Interscope Records and EastWest Records America. The recording sessions took place at Starlight Sound Studio in Richmond, Echo Sound Studio in Los Angeles and Unique Recording Studios in New York.

The album follows 2Pac's success after starring in the movie Juice, with commentary on social issues and former vice president Dan Quayle, who criticized the rapper for his violent lyrics. Peaking at No. 24 on the Billboard 200, this album saw more commercial success than its predecessor, and there are many noticeable differences in production. While 2Pac's first effort included a more underground or indie rap-oriented sound, this album was considered his breakout.

The album was supported with four singles: "Holler If Ya Hear Me", "I Get Around", "Keep Ya Head Up" and "Papa'z Song" with accompanying music videos.

In 1998 and 2003, the album was reissued through Amaru/Jive Records. In 2023, Interscope Records digitally reissued the album with six additional tracks subtitled 'Expanded Edition'.

== Background ==
In early 1992, 2Pac started working on a 2Pacalypse Now follow-up album originally titled Black Starry Night, which was renamed into Troublesome 21 during the recording process. The project was set to be released in September 1992, however, it was rejected by Time Warner due to media outcry and political legislatures over the lyrics. Several songs recorded for Troublesome 21, including "Keep Ya Head Up", "I Get Around", "Strictly fo' My Niggas" and "The Streetz R Deathrow" were utilised for the new track listing.

The punctuated abbreviation of the word "nigga" in the album's title stands for "Never Ignorant Getting Goals Accomplished", a backronym fabled by 2Pac.

== Critical reception ==
Professional ratings
Review scores
Source	Rating
AllMusic	3.5/5 stars
Christgau's Consumer Guide: Albums of the '90s	(choice cut)
Los Angeles Times	2.5/4 stars
Q	3/5
The New Rolling Stone Album Guide	5/5 stars
Select	1/5 medals
The Source	3.5/5 stars

Strictly 4 My N.I.G.G.A.Z... received generally positive reviews from music critics. In The New Rolling Stone Album Guide book, Greg Tate saw 2Pac "comes with a sense of drive, and eruptive, dissident, dissonant fervour worthy of Fear of a Black Planet and AmeriKKKa's Most Wanted", and called it Shakur's "best constructed and most coherent album, and it's also his most militantly political". AllMusic's Marisa Brown concluded: "though the production sometimes suffers, especially in the middle of the album, where it's utterly forgettable, the record shows a continually developing MC, with increasingly complex lyrical themes, well on his way to becoming nearly unstoppable".

Melody Maker called the album "an adventure into life on the streets of America", delivered through raps that "drip with the sweat of hardcore funk". Eric Berman of The Source wrote: "a combination of '60s black political thought and '90s urban reality, 2Pac is not afraid to speak his mind ... [balancing] the gangsta tendencies of street life with insightful revelations". Jonathan Gold of Los Angeles Times found the production accomplished and 2Pac's raps "sort of entertaining" but regarded him as "a gifted mimic" with "no discernible style of his own" and "not an especially deep thinker". Ian McCann of Q wrote that the album "found 2Pac feted by Hollywood and Ice Cube no longer an influence but a guest. Bitter, more distant, it offers the legendary "5 Deadly Venomz", "Keep Ya Head Up" and, ominously, "Something 2 Die 4", on which 2Pac's ma warns him if he can't find something to live for, he should find something worth dying for".

In his Christgau's Consumer Guide: Albums of the '90s book, Robert Christgau singled out "Keep Ya Head Up" as the album's only worthy track.

== Commercial performance ==
Strictly 4 My N.I.G.G.A.Z... debuted at number 24 on the US Billboard 200 and number four on the US Top R&B/Hip-Hop Albums, selling 38,000 units in its first week. On September 24, 1993, the album was certified gold by the Recording Industry Association of America for sales of over 500,000 copies in the United States, and on April 19, 1995, it received the RIAA platinum certification for sales of over one million copies in the US alone. On April 14, 2007, the album achieved silver certification by the British Phonographic Industry for sales of over 60,000 units in the United Kingdom.

The second single off of the album, "I Get Around", which features his D.U. band-mates Shock G and Money-B, peaked at number 11 on the Billboard Hot 100. The album's third single, "Keep Ya Head Up", which features Dave Hollister, made it to number 12 on the Billboard Hot 100. Both "I Get Around" and "Keep Ya Head Up" were certified platinum by the RIAA on March 31, 2021. The fourth and final single from Strictly 4 My N.I.G.G.A.Z..., "Papa'z Song", which features Mopreme Shakur, reached number 87 on the Billboard Hot 100.

After 2Pac's death in 1996, the album made it to the US Catalog Albums, peaking at number two.

== Track listing ==
No.	Title	Writer(s)	Producer(s)	Length
1.	"Holler If Ya Hear Me" (with Live Squad)	Tupac Shakur; Randy Walker; Norman Whitfield; Barrett Strong	Stretch	4:38
2.	"Pac's Theme (Interlude)"	Shakur; Buddy Guy; Junior Wells	The Underground Railroad	1:56
3.	"Point the Finga"	Shakur; Deon Evans	Big D the Impossible	4:25
4.	"Something 2 Die 4 (Interlude)"	Shakur; Evans; Curtis Mayfield	Big D the Impossible	2:43
5.	"Last Wordz" (with Ice Cube and Ice-T)	Shakur; Tracy Marrow; O'Shea Jackson; Bobby Ervin	DJ Bobcat	3:36
6.	"Souljah's Revenge"	Shakur; Ervin	DJ Bobcat	3:16
7.	"Peep Game" (with Deadly Threat)	Shakur; Corey Lloyd Brown; Ervin	DJ Bobcat	4:28
8.	"Strugglin'" (with Live Squad)	Shakur; R. Walker; Christopher Walker	Live Squad	3:33
9.	"Guess Who's Back"	Shakur; Edward Archer; Ronald Williams	Special Ed; Akshun	3:06
10.	"Representin' 93"	Shakur; Truman Jefferson; Jake Carter; Joe Sayles; Kevin Scott; Dwight Wyatt; James Brown; Bobby Byrd	Truman Jefferson	3:34
11.	"Keep Ya Head Up" (with Dave Hollister)	Shakur; Daryl Anderson; Roger Troutman	DJ Daryl	4:22
12.	"Strictly 4 My N.I.G.G.A.Z..."	Shakur; Larry Goodman	Laylaw	5:55
13.	"The Streetz R Deathrow"	Shakur; R. Walker; Barry White; Smead Hudman	Stretch	3:26
14.	"I Get Around" (with Digital Underground)	Shakur; Gregory Jacobs; Ronald Brooks; R. Troutman; Larry Troutman; Shirley Murdock	The D-Flow Production Squad	4:19
15.	"Papa'z Song" (with Wycked of W.A.T.M.)	Shakur; Evans; Joe Sample; Will Jennings	Big D the Impossible	5:25
16.	"5 Deadly Venomz" (with Treach of Naughty by Nature, Apache, and Live Squad)	Shakur; Anthony Criss; Anthony Peaks; R. Walker; C. Walker	Stretch	5:13
Total length:				64:05

2023 expanded edition
No.	Title	Writer(s)	Producer(s)	Length
17.	"Holler If Ya Hear Me (New York Stretch Mix)"	Shakur; R. Walker; Whitfield; Strong	Stretch	3:46
18.	"Keep Ya Head Up (Madukey Remix)"	Shakur; Anderson; R. Troutman; Stan Vincent	DJ Daryl; Bryant "Moe Doe" Johnson (add.); Lea Reis (add.)	4:18
19.	"I Get Around (Remix)" (featuring Digital Underground)	Shakur; Jacobs; Brooks; R. Troutman; L. Troutman; Murdock	The D-Flow Production Squad; DJ Battlecat (add.); Howard Johnson (add.); Khris Kellow (add.); Paul Arnold (add.)	6:04
20.	"Papa'z Song (Vibe Tribe Remix)" (featuring Wycked and Poppi)	Shakur; Evans; Sample; Jennings	Big D the Impossible; Duane Nettlesbey (add.); Norman "Slam" Whitfield, Jr. (add.)	5:16
21.	"Flex" (featuring Live Squad)	T. Shakur; Live Squad; Clarke	Stretch	4:16
22.	"Let's Get It On" (featuring Heavy D, Notorious B.I.G., Grand Puba, and Spunk Bigga)	T. Shakur; Dwight Myers; Christopher Wallace; Maxwell Dixon; Anthony Blagmon; William Morris; Michael Robinson	William Morris	4:05

Sample credits

- Track 1 contains a sample from "I Heard It Through the Grapevine", written by Norman Whitfield and Barrett Strong, as recorded by Roger Troutman.
- Track 2 contains samples from "Tennessee", as recorded by Arrested Development, and "Snatch It Back and Hold It", written by Buddy Guy and Junior Wells.
- Track 5 contains a sample from "Holy Ghost", written by Henderson Thigpen, James Banks, and Eddie Marion, as recorded by the Bar-Kays.
- Track 6 contains a sample from "Hallelujah I Love Her So".
- Track 7 contains a sample from "Don't Change Your Love", written and recorded by Curtis Mayfield.
- Track 10 contains a sample from "This One's for You", as recorded by Joe Public.
- Track 11 contains a sample from "Be Alright", written and recorded by Roger Troutman.
- Track 13 contains a sample from "You're the One I Need", written by Barry White and Smead Hudman, as recorded by Barry White.
- Track 14 contains a sample from "Computer Love", as recorded by Zapp.
- Track 15 contains a sample from "Soul Shadows", written by Joe Sample and Will Jennings, as recorded by Bill Withers.

== Personnel ==
- Tupac "2Pac" Shakur — vocals, co-producer
- Randy "Stretch" Walker — vocals (tracks: 1, 8, 16), producer (tracks: 1, 8, 13, 16)
- Christopher "Majesty" Walker — vocals (tracks: 1, 8, 16), producer (track 8)
- O'Shea "Ice Cube" Jackson — vocals (track 5)
- Tracy "Ice-T" Marrow — vocals (track 5)
- Corey "Deadly Threat" Brown — vocals (track 7)
- David "The Black Angel" Hollister — vocals (track 11)
- Pacific Heights — backing vocals (track 12)
- Gregory "Shock G" Jacobs — vocals & producer (track 14)
- Ronald "Money-B" Brooks — vocals (track 14)
- Maurice "Mopreme" Shakur — vocals (track 15)
- Poppi — vocals (track 15)
- Anthony "Treach" Criss — vocals (track 16)
- Anthony "Apache" Peaks — vocals (track 16)
- David "DJ Fuze" Elliot — drum programming (track 14)
- Stan Franks — guitar (track 15)
- Deon "Big D the Impossible" Evans — producer (tracks: 3, 4, 15)
- Bobby "DJ Bobcat" Ervin — producer (tracks: 5–7)
- Edward "Special Ed" Archer — producer (track 9)
- Ronald "Akshun" Williams — producer (track 9)
- Truman Jefferson — producer (track 10)
- Daryl L. "D.J. Daryl" Anderson — producer (track 11)
- Larry "Laylaw" Goodman — producer (track 12)
- Bob Morse — recording, mixing
- Darrin Harris — recording
- Mike Calderon — recording
- Atron Gregory — executive producer
- Eric Altenburger — art direction, design
- Jeffrey Newbury — photography
- Lisa Smith-Putnam — coordinator
- Leslie Gerard-Smith — coordinator
- Tom Whalley — A&R

== Charts ==
=== Weekly charts ===
Chart (1993)	Peak position
US Billboard 200	24
US Top R&B/Hip-Hop Albums (Billboard)	4

Chart (1996)	Position
US Top Catalog Albums (Billboard)	2

=== Year-end charts ===
Chart (1993)	Position
US Billboard 200	94
US Top R&B Albums (Billboard)	13

Chart (1994)	Position
US Top R&B/Hip-Hop Albums (Billboard)	79

== Certifications ==
Region	Certification	Certified units/sales
New Zealand (RMNZ)	Gold	7,500^{‡}
United Kingdom (BPI)	Silver	60,000^{‡}
United States (RIAA)	Platinum	1,639,584
^{‡} Sales+streaming figures based on certification alone.
