= Stretch (rapper) =

American rapper and record producer

- Stretch in 1993
- Born: Randy Walker; August 21, 1968; New York City, U.S.
- Died: November 30, 1995 (aged 27); New York City, U.S.
- Cause of death: Drive-by homicide (gunshot wounds)
- Other name: Big Stretch
- Occupations: Rapper; record producer
- Years active: 1988–1995
- Height: 6 ft 8 in (2.03 m)
- Children: 1
- Relatives: Majesty (brother)
- Musical career
- Genre: Hip hop
- Instrument: Vocals
- Labels: Tommy Boy; Grand Imperial
- Formerly of: Live Squad • Thug Life

Randy Walker (August 21, 1968 – November 30, 1995), better known by his stage name Stretch, was an American rapper and record producer, working in Live Squad. In the early 1990s, he joined 2Pac's rap group Thug Life. On November 30, 1994, the shooting of Shakur led to their split. A year later, Walker was shot and killed at the age of 27 on November 30, 1995.

== Live Squad ==
Randy Walker was born in 1968 in Springfield Gardens, Queens, New York City, to an African American father and Jamaican, immigrant mother. Randy had a younger brother and two sisters. His father died in 1981, and his mother, Lucilda, was a nurse at New York University Medical Center.

In the late 1980s, Randy, dubbed Stretch, and his brother Christopher, dubbed Majesty, teamed with DJ K-Low, forming Live Squad. In 1988, both rapping and producing it, Live Squad debut with an EP, titled BQ In Full Effect, which, featuring Percee P, includes the tracks "Troopin It" and "We Ain't Havin' It." Noteworthy is Stretch's voice, deep and raspy.

In 1990, Stretch met Shock G of Digital Underground, the Bay Area rap group's 1991 album featured Stretch on its track "Family of the Underground." That year, Live Squad remixed the group's single "No Nose Job." That summer, Stretch met Underground ally Tupac "2Pac" Shakur. The two became fast friends. Rapping his February 1992 single "If My Homie Calls" on Yo! MTV Raps, 2Pac was backed by Stretch, friend of host Ed Lover, who, praising Live Squad's demo tape and taking "executive producer" credit on its releases, helped Live get signed to Tommy Boy Records.

In 1992, Live Squad released a double A side, "Murderahh!"/"Heartless," followed by single, "Game of Survival"/"Pump for a Livin'," in 1993. Live Squad also released an ultra-violent promo short film, Game Of Survival, on VHS tape, showcasing six songs from the group's forthcoming album. In June, national outrage broke out over the Los Angeles area's original gangsta rapper Ice-T's side project, his rock band Body Count's album of heavy metal with its track "Cop Killer." Tommy Boy, favoring radio friendliness, dropped Live Squad and shelved the album.

== Teaming with 2Pac ==
While Tupac filmed his breakthrough role in Juice, Stretch and Treach, of rap group Naughty By Nature, were extras. Once Tupac's trailer was robbed of jewelry, they delivered a beatdown on set. In late 1991, after studio recordings, live shows, and TV appearances with Stretch, 2Pac put out his debut album, 2Pacalypse Now, with two tracks, including "Crooked Ass Nigga," where Stretch produces and raps.

Unable to put a track on Juice's soundtrack, 2Pac saw his album sell modestly, but Juice's release in 1992 sent his star on the rise. In 1993, 2Pac's second album, Strictly 4 My N.I.G.G.A.Z., found Live Squad producing and featured on "Strugglin'," while featured, along with Treach and rapper Apache, on "5 Deadly Venomz." That was produced by Stretch, who produced two more tracks, "The Streetz R Deathrow" and, featuring Live Squad, "Holler If Ya Hear Me."

Stretch made cameo appearances in music videos for the Mac Mall song "Ghetto Theme," directed by Tupac, and, in 1993, for the Above The Law, Money B, and Tupac song "Call It What You Want,". He appeared in movies, Ed Lover & Doctor Dre's 1993 film Who's the Man? and Tupac's 1996 film Bullet. In March 1994, on The Arsenio Hall Show, 2Pac and Stretch performed "Pain," a track on the Above the Rim soundtrack's only cassette version and merely a single's B side, but swiftly a rap favorite.

== 2Pac's group Thug Life ==
In 1992, with rapper Big Syke, 2Pac and Stretch recorded "Thug Life." In 1993, that song was still unreleased, so Tupac expanded the group, also named Thug Life, and got it signed to Interscope Records, releasing in 1994 the group's only album, Thug Life: Volume 1. Stretch produced and rhymed on the song "Thug Music". Amid controversy over lyrics, the label cut "Out on Bail", which Tupac and Stretch performed at The ’94 Source Awards, anyway, and "Runnin' from tha Police", featuring Biggie Smalls.

In 1993, Tupac met Biggie, a promising young rapper from Brooklyn, on his visit to California. Tupac supported and mentored him, a prospective member of Thug Life. During 1993, Live Squad, 2Pac, and Biggie performed a joint set at Maryland's Bowie State University, in Prince George's County, Maryland. and recorded "House Of Pain," unreleased, for Biggie's debut album in the making.

Biggie's debut album arrived, without the song, in 1994 as Ready to Die. The alliance was severed through events on the night of November 30, 1994, at the Times Square building of Quad Recording Studios.

== November 1994 shooting ==
In late 1994, Tupac was reportedly hired by fledgling music manager James "Jimmy Henchman" Rosemond to record a verse for rapper Lil' Shawn's single "Dom Perignon." Arriving with Stretch and two others, they reportedly found rapper Lil' Cease—a member of the Bad Boy record label's circle via Biggie's side group Junior M.A.F.I.A.—watching the sidewalk from above and greeting them. In the lobby, three men pulled pistols to rob Tupac, who, resisting, was shot five times.

Suspecting a shooting as the primary motive, Tupac pointed to, among others, Henchman and Biggie. Blaming Henchman and Haitian Jack for the setup, Tupac accused Biggie of withholding prior knowledge.

The day after the shooting Tupac was convicted in a Manhattan court of sexual assault. On February 14, 1995, he was sentenced to at least a year and a half in prison. In March, 2Pac's third album, Me Against the World, was released with Stretch removed from its track "So Many Tears." In a jailhouse interview published in April, Tupac discusses the November shooting and Stretch, incidentally 6'8":

"I was, like, 'What should I do?' I’m thinking Stretch is going to fight; he was towering over those niggas. From what I know about the criminal element, if niggas come to rob you, they always hit the big nigga first. But they didn’t touch Stretch; they came straight to me."

In the interview, Tupac reflected,

Stretch was my closest dog, my closest homie. I did a lot of drama, I got into a lot of cases and shit because of Stretch. Money-wise, he could've had anything. His daughter was my daughter; whatever she wanted she could have. Then this shit happened and the nigga didn't ride for me. He didn't do what your dog is supposed to do when you shot up. When I was in jail, nigga never wrote me, never got at me. His homeboys was coming to see me and he wasn't coming to see me. And he started hanging around Biggie right after this. I'm in jail, shot up, his main dog, and he hanging out going to shows with Biggie. Both these niggas never came to see me.

— Tupac Shakur, Source magazine, March 1996

No strong evidence emerged to implicate Stretch in the crime. Publicly responding, Stretch contended, "Pac's saying all this shit in the interview, like, 'I thought that Stretch was gonna fight. He was towering over them.' Now, that nigga know I ain't never going out like no bitch. But I ain't dumb. I ain't got no gun, what the fuck am I supposed to do? I might be towering over niggas, but I ain't towering over no slugs."

Some reporting suggested forensics evidence that Tupac had shot himself. Stretch offered, "Me personally, I only heard one shot. ... Tupac got shot trying to go for his shit. He tried to go for his gun, and he made a mistake on his own. But I'll let him tell the world that. ... He tried to turn around and pull the joint out real quick, but niggas caught him. Grabbed his hand when it was by his waist."

Me and Pac have been down from day one. Before he did Juice, before his first album. That's my man. So the interview he did in Vibe bugged me out. But I know him. He likes to talk a lot. Especially when he's upset, he'll say shit that he won't even mean. And then he'll think about it later and be, like, "Damn, why the fuck did I say that?" ... In that interview, Pac was talking all that shit about Thug Life is ignorance and telling niggas' names and all that shit. I don't even understand why he went there. I've seen Pac mad times after the shooting and he never kicked none of that shit to me. You know how he feels about the media, so why would he go and do an interview like that? He's supposed to be a street nigga; he should've kept it in the street. I mean, niggas had to go and get their names changed. I want him to get a reality check. Recognize what the fuck he's doing. Niggas on the street live by rules, man. And that rule right there, that's a rule that's never to be broken.

— Randy "Stretch" Walker, Vibe magazine, 1995

Bill Courtney, retired New York Police Department officer, once with its infamous "Hip-Hop Squad," suggested that the stickup answered Tupac's comments, published in New York's Daily News, about Jimmy Henchman's associate Haitian Jack, big in the Queens nightlife scene and criminal underworld. Haitian Jack and two other men had been indicted with Tupac for the November 1993 sexual assault on a woman in Tupac's hotel room, whereby Tupac was convicted on December 1, 1994.

By then, Haitian Jack had taken a misdemeanor plea deal for no jail time, and the newspaper published Tupac's gripe. The onetime "Hip-Hop Squad" officer hazards, "A message was being sent to him not to name-drop." Jimmy Henchman has since commented, "Nobody came to rob you. They came to discipline you."

== Murder ==
On November 30, 1995, Stretch was on his way to a Biggie Smalls event after leaving the Nas recording session at midnight. He dropped off his own brother Majesty at his Queens Village home. Two or three men in a black car pulled up beside Stretch's green minivan, and gave chase, firing from a rolled down window. Stretch crashed at 112th Avenue and 209th Street, just after 12:30 AM. He was found dead with four bullets to his back.

In April 2007, via separate investigation into the murder of Jam Master Jay of Run-DMC, in his native Jamaica, Queens, federal prosecutors named Ronald "Tenad" Washington as a suspect in the deaths of both Jay and Stretch. Washington would eventually be indicted for Jam Master Jay's murder in August 2020; Washington's trial would then begin in January 2024, and he, along with another defendant, would be convicted for Jam Master Jay's murder in February 2024.

=== Speculations on circumstances ===
On October 12, 1995, Tupac was released from prison in upstate New York. His bond was posted via Suge Knight, former CEO of Death Row Records, and Tupac's legal case was pending appeals. Joining the label in Los Angeles, Tupac feverishly recorded his fourth album, All Eyez on Me. Two tracks, in particular ("Ambitionz Az a Ridah" as well as "Holla At Me") have lyrics that some people speculate contain insults against Stretch, one envisioning his death.

By the album's release on February 13, 1996, Stretch was already dead. Released a few months later, in July 1996, the sophomore album, It Was Written, by rapper Nas, from Queensbridge in Queens, had Live Squad production on two tracks, "Take It In Blood" as well as "Silent Murder," from Stretch's final recording session exactly one year after the November 30, 1994, shooting of Tupac.

In one theory about Stretch's death he was accused of robbing "a big drug dealer of over 10 bricks". Despite the "pressure on the street," he refused to return the over 10 kilograms of cocaine, and this is why "a hit was issued."

After Tupac's death in a drive-by shooting in Las Vegas, in September 1996, a Live Squad production, the track "Nothing to Lose," appeared on the first posthumous 2Pac album, released in 1997, R U Still Down? (Remember Me). Released in 1997, Greatest Hits has the cryptic "God Bless the Dead," dedicated to "Biggy Smallz," but not the famed Live Squad and onetime 2Pac associate Biggie Smalls who is otherwise called The Notorious B.I.G., and instead a Latino rapper who worked with one of 2Pac's main producers, Johnny J.

In 1999, a promotional release for The Notorious B.I.G.'s posthumous album Born Again, has a Bad Boy remix of "House of Pain," featuring Stretch and 2Pac. Stretch's brother Majesty founded Grand Imperial Records jointly with rapper E-MoneyBags. He was killed in July 2001, allegedly by order of Kenneth "Supreme" McGriff, a suspect behind the murder of Jam Master Jay; McGriff would eventually be convicted for E-MoneyBags' murder and be sentenced to life imprisonment in February 2007. In 2001, Majesty released the Live Squad album that Tommy Boy Records had nixed, Game Of Survival.

== Discography ==
Year	Song	Artist(s)	Album	
1988	"Troopin' It"	Live Squad	BQ In Full Effect	Rapper and co-producer (with Live Squad)
1988	"We Ain't Havin It"	Live Squad	BQ In Full Effect	Rapper and co-producer (with Live Squad)
1991	"Family of the Underground"	Digital Underground	Sons of the P	Rapper
1991	"No Nose Job (Fat Bass International Mix)"	Digital Underground	No Nose Job (Single)	Co-producer (with Live Squad)
1991	"Crooked Ass Nigga"	2Pac	2Pacalypse Now	Rapper and producer
1991	"Tha' Lunatic"	2Pac	2Pacalypse Now	Rapper and co-producer (with Live Squad)
1992	"Murderahh"	Live Squad	Murderahh / Heartless (Single)	Rapper and co-producer (with Live Squad)
1992	"Heartless"	Live Squad	Murderahh / Heartless (Single)	Rapper and co-producer (with Live Squad)
1992	"Pass The 40"	Raw Fusion, 2Pac, D The Poet 151, Bulldog, Saafir, Pee-Wee, Mac Mone	Hollywood Records Sampler	Rapper
1992	"Roses (Live Squad Remix)"	Rhythm-N-Bass	Roses (Single)	Co-producer (with Live Squad)
1993	"Holler If Ya Hear Me'"	2Pac	Strictly 4 My N.I.G.G.A.Z.	Producer
1993	"Strugglin'"	2Pac, Live Squad	Strictly 4 My N.I.G.G.A.Z.	Rapper and co-producer (with Live Squad)
1993	"The Streets R Death Row'"	2Pac	Strictly 4 My N.I.G.G.A.Z.	Producer
1993	"5 Deadly Venomz"	2Pac, Live Squad, Treach & Apache	Strictly 4 My N.I.G.G.A.Z.	Rapper and producer
1993	"Holler If Ya Hear Me (Black Caesar Mix)'"	2Pac	Holler If Ya Hear Me (Single)	Producer
1993	"Holler If Ya Hear Me (Broadway Mix)'"	2Pac	Holler If Ya Hear Me (Single)	Producer
1993	"Holler If Ya Hear Me (New York Stretch Mix)'"	2Pac	Holler If Ya Hear Me (Single)	Producer
1993	"Flex'"	2Pac, Thoro Headz, Live Squad	Holler If Ya Hear Me (Single)	Rapper and producer
1993	"Hellrazor"	2Pac, Stretch	Hellrazor (Promo Cassette)	Rapper and producer
1993	"Game Of Survival"	Live Squad	Game Of Survival / Pump For A Livin' (Promo Single)	Rapper and co-producer (with Live Squad)
1993	"Pump For A Livin'"	Live Squad	Game Of Survival / Pump For A Livin' (Promo Single)	Rapper and co-producer (with Live Squad)
1993	"Hurts The Most"	2Pac, Mopreme & Stretch	Thug Life Out On Bail Album	Rapper and producer
1994	"Papa'z Song (Da Bastard's Remix)"	2Pac, Stretch	Papa'z Song (Single)	Rapper and producer
1994	"Pain"	2Pac, Stretch	Above The Rim – The Soundtrack (Cassette only) and Regulate (song) single (b-side)	Rapper and producer
1994	"Bury Me A G"	Thug Life	Thug Life: Volume 1	Co-producer (with 2Pac & Live Squad as Thug Music)
1994	"Shit Don't Stop"	Thug Life	Thug Life: Volume 1	Co-producer (with 2Pac & Live Squad as Thug Music)
1994	"Stay True"	Thug Life	Thug Life: Volume 1	Rapper and co-producer (with 2Pac & Live Squad as Thug Music)
1994	"Under Pressure"	Thug Life	Thug Life: Volume 1	Rapper and co-producer (with 2Pac & Live Squad as Thug Music)
1994	"Street Fame"	Thug Life	Thug Life: Volume 1	Producer
1995	"Runnin' From tha Police"	The Notorious B.I.G., 2Pac, Dramacydal, Lil Vicious	One Million Strong	Rapper
1995	"So Many Tears"	2Pac	Me Against The World	Backing vocals (verse removed)
1996	"Take It In Blood"	Nas	It Was Written	Co-producer (with Live Squad)
1996	"Silent Murder"	Nas	It Was Written	Co-producer (with Live Squad)
1997	"Hellrazor"	2Pac, Stretch, Val Young	R U Still Down? (Remember Me)	Rapper (original producer)
1997	"Nothing To Lose"	2Pac	R U Still Down? (Remember Me)	Co-producer (with 2Pac & Live Squad)
1997	"Hold On Be Strong"	2Pac, Stretch	R U Still Down? (Remember Me)	Rapper
1997	"Only Fear Of Death"	2Pac	R U Still Down? (Remember Me)	Co-producer (with Live Squad)
1998	"God Bless the Dead"	2Pac, Stretch	Greatest Hits	Rapper
1999	"House Of Pain (Bad Boy Remix)"	The Notorious B.I.G., Stretch, 2Pac, Joe Hooker	Born Again Promo	Rapper
1999	"What You Need"	E-MoneyBags, Live Squad	In E-MoneyBags We Trust	Vocal appearance
2001	"Big Time"	E-MoneyBags, Live Squad, 2Pac	Regulate / Big Time (Single)	Rapper
2001	Game Of Survival: The Movie	Live Squad	Game Of Survival: The Movie	Rapper and co-producer
2005	"Moving Up"	Live Squad	Thugadons: Grand Goons Vol. 1	Rapper
2005	"Nobody Move"	Live Squad	Thugadons: Grand Goons Vol. 2	Rapper
2005	"Life So Hard On A G"	2Pac	The Way He Wanted It Vol. 1	Producer
2007	"Shedding More Tearz"	2Pac	The Way He Wanted It Vol. 3	Rapper
2007	"The House of Pain"	2Pac, The Notorious B.I.G.	The Way He Wanted It Vol. 3	Rapper

== See also ==
- List of murdered hip hop musicians
- List of unsolved murders (1980–1999)
