= Bullet (1996 film) =

1996 American crime drama film directed by Julien Temple

- Theatrical release poster
- Directed by: Julien Temple
- Written by: Mickey Rourke; Bruce Rubenstein
- Produced by: John Flock
- Starring: Mickey Rourke; Tupac Shakur; Ted Levine; Adrien Brody
- Cinematography: Crescenzo Notarile
- Edited by: Niven Howie
- Music by: Randall Poster
- Production companies: Village Roadshow Pictures; Clipsal Films
- Distributed by: New Line Cinema
- Release date: October 1, 1996
- Running time: 96 minutes
- Country: United States
- Language: English

Bullet is a 1996 American crime film directed by Julien Temple, written by Mickey Rourke and Bruce Rubenstein, and starring Rourke and Tupac Shakur. Rourke also served as the film's music supervisor.

The film was shot in New York City in 1994 with a significant portion done in Brooklyn. The film's release was delayed by over two years, before it premiered in October 1996, a month after Shakur's death. It was released direct-to-video worldwide.

== Plot ==
Thirty-five-year-old Jewish-American convict and junkie, Butch "Bullet" Stein, is released from prison on parole after serving an 8-year sentence for being an accomplice to a robbery, perpetrated by his friend, Irish-American gangster Paddy. Bullet and his friend Lester rob two teenagers for drugs. He also robs drug runner Flaco and stabs him in the eye, telling him to notify his boss Tank of his return. He returns to Brooklyn to live with his dysfunctional family, including his alcoholic father, depressed mother, two brothers, the older mentally unstable Vietnam veteran Louis, and his younger brother Ruby, an aspiring graffiti artist. Tank is a local drug kingpin with a score to settle, after Bullet stabbed him in the eye while spending time together, and Bullet accepts the challenge. Tank first pressures Paddy to find and deliver Bullet to him. Later, he tries to have him killed by having one of Paddy's dealers sell Bullet drugs laced with poison. This fails when the drug spot is robbed by gunmen, one of whom proceeds to stab Ruby through the hand with a knife.

Bullet keeps himself occupied by shooting heroin and robbing his neighbor's house for jewelry, which he and Lester sell to an Italian-American gangster named "Frankie Eyelashes". He also encourages Ruby to follow his artistic dreams and has a deep friend-to-friend talk with Lester over his potential closeted homosexuality, because of his mother abandoning him and his father's death when he was a child, but he denies it. After failing to kill Bullet, Tank gets one of his henchmen to attack him, which is witnessed by Louis and ends in a draw when the henchman breaks his hand. Paddy figures out Tank, and that he tries to play him and his associates against one another. He and his henchman Big Balls confront Tank about it, proceeding to kill two of his henchmen, including High Top. Bullet briefly returns home and apologizes to his mother for everything he put her through over the years. He later goes to a nightclub with Ruby and Lester. Paddy tries to help Bullet escape, before Tank arrives. Bullet confronts the gang, but Tank kills him. After the funeral, Louis kills Tank and has Bullet's pet rat (named after Tony Curtis) drink his blood.

== Cast ==
- Mickey Rourke as Butch "Bullet" Stein
- Tupac Shakur as "Tank"
- Adrien Brody as Reuben "Ruby" Stein
- Ted Levine as Louis Stein
- Matthew Powers as Paddy
- Donnie Wahlberg as "Big Balls"
- Suzanne Shepherd as "Cookie" Stein
- Jerry Grayson as Sol Stein
- Manny Pérez as "Flaco"
- Gina Figueroa as Laura
- John Enos III as Lester
- Gene Canfield as Reiner
- Michael K. Williams as "High Top"
- Big Stretch/Randy Walker as Dallas
- Peter Dinklage as Building Manager
- Jermaine Hopkins as "Pudgy"

== See also ==
- List of hood films
