= Spice 1 (album) =

Studio album by Spice 1
- Released: April 14, 1992
- Recorded: 1990–1991
- Genre: Gangsta rap
- Length: 56:38
- Label: Jive
- Producers: Ant Banks; Blackjack; E-A-Ski & CMT; Spice 1

Spice 1 chronology
Let It Be Known (1991)	Spice 1 (1992)	187 He Wrote (1993)

Singles from Spice 1
- 1. "In My Neighborhood" Released: March 30, 1992; 2. "Welcome to the Ghetto" Released: June 12, 1992

Spice 1 is the debut studio album by American rapper Spice 1. It was released on April 14, 1992, on Jive Records. It was certified gold by the RIAA. The album was produced by Ant Banks, Blackjack, E-A-Ski & CMT, and Spice 1. It peaked at number 14 on the Billboard Top R&B/Hip-Hop Albums and at number 82 on the Billboard Top Heatseekers. One single, "Welcome to the Ghetto", peaked at number 39 on the Billboard Hot R&B/Hip-Hop Songs and at number 5 on the Billboard Rap Songs.

Along with singles, music videos were produced for four songs: "In My Neighborhood", "Welcome to the Ghetto", "187 Proof" and "East Bay Gangsta". Richie Rich makes a cameo appearance in "Welcome to the Ghetto". "East Bay Gangsta" and "Welcome to the Ghetto" were B-sides on the other singles.

== Critical reception ==
Professional ratings
Review scores
Source	Rating
AllMusic	3/5 stars
Entertainment Weekly	B
The Source	4/5 stars

Entertainment Weekly (7/24/92, p. 60) - "...Spice 1's lyrics are clever enough to make you forget you've heard it all before...his tales unfold with the drama of short stories..." AllMusic - "...His style, an appropriate mix of irony, disdain, acceptance and confusion, never succumbs to the situation or seeks to justify or downplay the sense of impending doom." The album was included in The Source's 100 greatest hip hop albums.

== Track listing ==
Spice 1
No.	Title	Writer(s)	Producer(s)	Length
1.	"In My Neighborhood"	Robert L. Green, Jr.; Byron Miller; C.I. Johnson; George Duke; Leon "Ndugu" Chancler	Ant Banks; Spice 1	3:42
2.	"187 Proof"	Green	Banks	3:50
3.	"East Bay Gangster (Reggae)"	Green	E-A-Ski & CMT; Spice 1	4:31
4.	"Money Gone"	Green	Blackjack; Spice 1	3:46
5.	"1-800-Spice"	Green; Gordon Sumner	Banks; Spice 1	4:03
6.	"Peace to My Nine"	Green; Garry Shider; George Clinton; Walter "Junie" Morrison	Banks; Spice 1	4:58
7.	"Young Nigga"	Green	E-A-Ski & CMT; Spice 1	5:00
8.	"Welcome to the Ghetto"	Green; James "Jimmy Jam" Harris III; Terry Lewis; Marvin Gaye	Spice 1/ (Blackjack uncredited)	4:09
9.	"Fucked in the Game"	Green	Blackjack; Spice 1	4:03
10.	"Money or Murder"	Green	Banks; Spice 1	4:26
11.	"City Streets"	Green	Banks; Spice 1	4:49
12.	"1-900-Spice"	Green	Banks; Spice 1	1:33
13.	"Break Yourself" (featuring MC Ant)	Green	Banks; Spice 1	4:10
14.	"187 Pure"	Green	E-A-Ski & CMT; Spice 1	3:38
Total length:				56:38

== Samples ==
Welcome to the Ghetto

- "Inner City Blues (Make Me Wanna Holler)" by Marvin Gaye
- "No One's Gonna Love You" by the S.O.S. Band

187 Pure

- "Take Me to the Mardi Gras" by Bob James

City Streets

- "Whatcha See Is Whatcha Get" by the Dramatics

F***ed in the Game

- "Make Me Believe in You" by Curtis Mayfield

In My Neighborhood

- "Reach for It" by George Duke

Money Gone

- "Time for a Change" by Mel Brown

Money or Murder

- "Joy by Isaac Hayes

Peace to My Nine

- "One Nation Under a Groove" by Funkadelic

Young N****

- "Mothership Connection (Star Child)" by Parliament
- "Us" by Ice Cube

Note: The sample credits contain a disclaimer from George Clinton disparaging the lyrical content of the song, yet stating the sample was allowed due to the message of music as a free agent of change inherent in "Mothership Connection." This type of note was uncommon for most artists who were sampling.

== Charts ==
=== Weekly charts ===
Chart (1992)	Peak position
US Billboard 200 (Billboard)	82
US Top R&B/Hip-Hop Albums (Billboard)	14

=== Year-end charts ===
Chart (1992)	Position
US Top R&B/Hip-Hop Albums (Billboard)	35

== Certifications ==
Region	Certification	Certified units/sales
United States (RIAA)	Gold	500,000^{^}
^{^} Shipments figures based on certification alone.
