= Jerry Grayson =

British helicopter pilot (born 1955)

Jerry Grayson AFC
- Born: 26 June 1955 (age 71); Arundel, Sussex, England, United Kingdom
- Military career
- Allegiance: United Kingdom
- Branch: Royal Navy
- Service years: 1972 – 1980
- Rank: Captain
- Units: 824 Naval Air Squadron; 771 Naval Air Squadron
- Awards: Air Force Cross (United Kingdom); Nautical Medal, 1st Class
- Other work: Rescue Pilot; Film Pilot
- Website: jerryg.co rescuepilot.net

Jerry Grayson, AFC is a British naval helicopter pilot who served with the Royal Navy from 1972 to 1980. He is known for being the youngest pilot to ever serve in the Royal Navy. As he flew for the Royal Navy, he was part of the Fleet Air Arm which operates naval military aircraft. Grayson took part in the Fastnet 1979 race which earned him the Air Force Cross during the three day operation.

== Career ==
=== On-board HMS Ark Royal (R09) ===
After completing his training to become an Aircrew Officer Pilot at Britannia Royal Naval College at age 17, he was assigned to anti-submarine operations on-board HMS Ark Royal with 824 NAS. He flew Westland Sea Kings on operations.

=== Search and Rescue (SAR) ===
Following his transfer from anti-submarine warfare operations onboard HMS Ark Royal, he flew with 771 NAS which operated out of RNAS Culdrose. He served in the SAR role for his last three years in the navy, 1977-1980 which is when he decided to leave the navy. During his time in the search and rescue role, he flew multiple variants of Wessex helicopters.

Jerry Grayson had multiple successes while serving as a pilot with 771 NAS. He actively took part with his crew in the hectic Fastnet Race of 1979 when he earned himself the Air Force Cross for his successes in the three day operation. His success in this field made him the most decorated peacetime search and rescue pilot in the Royal Navy. Not only was he the most decorated, he was the youngest ever to be a pilot. At 17, he graduated Britannia Royal Naval Academy in 1972 to become the youngest Royal Navy pilot ever.

==== M/V Skopelos Sky ====
M/V Skopelos Sky was a Greek bulk carrier vessel built in 1961. The vessel was abandoned 15 December 1979 after which it ran aground on the Cornish coast of southwest England. The incident happened during a time which is known for its bad weather conditions in and around the coast of Cornwall. The vessel was carrying lubricant oil en route from Garston to Algiers in Libya.

Jerry Grayson and his crew in a Wessex helicopter were scrambled from RNAS Culdrose to a distress call from the M/V Skopelos Sky. The crew were insistent that they could still salvage the ship so they sat on a clifftop watching the situation unfold. Grayson was assisted by an RAF Search and Rescue crew but they returned to base after Grayson and his crew relieved them of their watch. Grayson told the captain of the vessel that time was running out and decided to bluff them by climbing out of sight until the captain called for them to return and get them off the doomed ship. All 15 crew members were hoisted off of the ship. No casualties were suffered from either party.

== Awards and honours ==
Jerry Grayson has been awarded the Air Force Cross in March 1980 for his actions in the Fastnet 1979 Race.

3 March 1980

Dear Grayson
I am delighted to inform you that Her Majesty the Queen has approved the award of Her Commendation for Valuable Air Service in the Air to you in recognition of your outstanding contribution to the rescue of participants in last year's Fastnet Race. Please accept my heartiest congratulations.
Until the publication of the award in the London Gazette on 4 March you should keep this news to your immediate family. You will be informed of the arrangements for the presentation of your award in due course.

Your sincerely
Rear Admiral Edward Anson
Flag Officer Naval Air Command

— Jerry Grayson, AFC, Rescue Pilot (2015)

Not only has he been awarded the Air Force Cross, he was given a foreign medal from the Hellenic Navy due to his efforts for rescuing the crew of the M/V Skopelos Sky on 15 December 1979. He was given special disposition for unrestricted wear of the medal by Her Majesty the Queen.

Sir,
I have the honour to inform you that the Queen has been graciously pleased to grant you unrestricted permission to wear the Nautical Medal, 1st Class which has been conferred upon you by the Government of the Hellenic Republic in recognition of your services. I have the honour to be, Sir,
Your obedient servant.

— Jerry Grayson, AFC, Rescue Pilot (2015)
