= Whoreson (novel) =

Novel by Donald Goines

Whoreson is a novel by Donald Goines that has been rumoured to be at least partly autobiographical. Goines wrote the novel while incarcerated and sought input from his fellow inmates, who urged him to submit the work to Holloway House. It is Goines's first written work and was written before Dopefiend but was published in 1972, after Dopefiend was released.

American drug lord Kenneth "Supreme" McGriff had read the book while in prison and had intention to buy the rights to the book for a film adaptation before returning to prison again.

== Plot ==
The novel tells the story of a man born to a prostitute. His mother names him Whoreson at birth and tries to teach him how to be a pimp. Whoreson tries to build a stable of women, but finds his women taken in by another pimp. He is, for a short time, imprisoned as he is found guilty of pandering, though he has never actually taken any money from the woman he was convicted of pandering.

After his release from prison, Whoreson cons money out of a woman and puts together a phony wedding to convince her that the two are married. Eventually a childhood sweetheart who has become a successful singer agrees to marry Whoreson. Before they can enjoy their love, Whoreson finds himself double-crossed by one of his former prostitutes and is sentenced to a jail term of several years.
