= Holler If Ya Hear Me =

1993 single by 2Pac

Single by 2Pac

from the album Strictly 4 My N.I.G.G.A.Z.
- Released: February 4, 1993
- Recorded: 1992
- Genre: Hardcore hip-hop; political hip-hop
- Length: 4:38
- Label: TNT; Interscope; Atlantic
- Songwriter: Tupac Shakur
- Producer: Stretch

2Pac singles chronology
"Call It What U Want" (1992)	"Holler If Ya Hear Me" (1993)	"Gotta Get Mine" (1993)

Audio sample
- "Holler If Ya Hear Me": file; help

Music video
- "Holler If Ya Hear Me" on YouTube

"Holler If Ya Hear Me" is a song by American rapper 2Pac from his second solo studio album, Strictly 4 My N.I.G.G.A.Z. (1993). It was released on February 4, 1993, as the album's lead single. The track is an anthem of resistance. Frustrations with black poverty, police injustice, and Tupac's perceived persecution from political figure Dan Quayle fuel the majority of the track. The song is autobiographical in nature, referring to various traumas experienced by Tupac himself, and the editor of Vibe was quoted in Time magazine as stating that the song struck a chord with a large section of disaffected youth.

The song was used by Michael Eric Dyson as the title of his book about the life of Tupac Shakur. The song was also used as a title for a musical based on Shakur's music, which premiered on Broadway at the Palace Theatre on May 26, 2014 and closed on July 20, 2014. The non-biographical musical, directed by Kenny Leon and starring rapper/poet Saul Williams, was also produced by Shakur's mother, Afeni Shakur. The song was also played in the 1994 film Above the Rim, which starred Tupac.

== Music video ==
The video made for the single was shot completely in black-and-white. Much like the track, the video clips were shot in an energetic, nearly-chaotic pace. The video starts off from the viewpoint of a young boy who witnesses his father's death. Tupac's lyrics of resistance to injustice and encouragement to bear arms and fight back are backed by his gathering groups of young black men and women to march in the streets. Between these are clips of the young boy in the aftermath of his father's death. After seeing his mother reminiscing on her lost husband, the young boy finds money in the house and takes to the street, later seen buying a gun from someone in an alley. Near the end of the video, Tupac, sporting a bulletproof vest, is walking around in a shooting range with a group of young people taking shots at paper targets (notably accurate in hitting "rib cage" and other vital locations on each target). In the final scene, Tupac and company have left, and the young boy is seen standing alone at the shooting range. He takes off his baseball cap and reveals himself to be a girl - the cap concealing her long hair. She reaches into her coat to retrieve her gun and, now aiming at the target, fires a round. The music video was shot in 1992.

== Track list ==
- A1. Holler If Ya Hear Me (Black Caesar Radio Mix)
- A2. Holler If Ya Hear Me (Black Caesar LP Version)
- A3. Holler If Ya Hear Me (Black Caesar Instrumental)
- B1. Holler If Ya Hear Me (Broadway Mix)
- B2. Holler If Ya Hear Me (New York Stretch Mix)
- B3. Flex
