= Black Girl Lost =

1974 novel by Donald Goines

First edition (publ. Holloway House)

Black Girl Lost is an urban fiction novel by Donald Goines that was published in 1974.

== Plot ==
The novel and details the life of a girl named Sandra. She grows up in a home with an absent father and an alcoholic mother, but finds a father figure in a local Jewish shop owner. After detailing some troubling scenes from her childhood, the novel moves to the present where Sandra picks up a package discarded by a passing car that is pursued by police.

Eventually bringing this package to a classmate who deals drugs, Sandra falls in love with the pusher (neither uses drugs themselves) and things start to pick up for both of them. Neither has to steal any longer to provide themselves with clothes or food, and the two find solace in each other and move in together. The boyfriend is arrested for possession and sent to a correctional institution until age 18.

While he is incarcerated, Sandra finds herself held hostage in the shared apartment by some characters who rob her, gang rape her and beat her. When she visits her boyfriend in prison and tells him what happens, he decides to escape from the correctional facility. A bloody climax is the result and Sandra's boy friend, who refuses to go back to jail, insists on holding court in the street, once he has taken out the thugs who violated Sandra.

== Reception and legacy ==
In a 2013 review, Pablo Tanguay writes that the novel starts nuanced, but "becomes relentless, a series of horrors, each horror (possibly) worse than the horror preceding." Though Tanguay describes the novel as not "artistic", he describes the novel as: "relentless, and his vision almost unbearably true: Black Girl Lost insists, as does, so far as we know, the universe, that no one gets out alive. Goines’s universe just happens to be the American ghetto of the Seventies."

Nas has a song called "Black Girl Lost", which has content and title inspired by the book.
