= Kenyatta series =

1974 novels by Donald Goines

- List of books: Crime Partners; Death List; Kenyatta's Escape; Kenyatta's Last Hit
- Author: Donald Goines (writing as Al C. Clark)
- Country: United States
- Language: English
- Genre: Urban fiction
- Publisher: Holloway House Publishing Company
- Published: 1974
- Media type: Print (Paperback)

The Kenyatta series is a four-volume urban fiction series by American author Donald Goines under the pseudonym of Al C. Clark. Goines released the books under a pseudonym on the request of his publisher, who wanted to avoid flooding the market with too many books under Goines's name and potentially undermining sales as well as to differentiate the books from Goines's "grittier" urban fiction novels.

The books cover the actions of a man by the name of Kenyatta, named after Jomo Kenyatta, that leads a group of militant blacks similar to the Black Panther Party. The series comprises four books, Crime Partners, Death List, Kenyatta's Escape, and Kenyatta's Last Hit. Goines released the first book in June 1974 through Holloway House, with the final book being published posthumously in November of the same year.

== Synopsis ==
=== Crime Partners ===
Crime Partners introduces the character of Kenyatta, the leader of a group of militant Black people. The novel also introduces the reader to a pair of detectives named Benson and Ryan, who are intent on tracking down the people responsible for the murders going on in the city. The story takes place in Detroit, where two stick-up men named Jackie and Billy break into the apartment of a drug addicted couple. They discover the body of a child that had been beaten to death, which enrage them. Jackie and Billy then decide to kill the couple in addition to robbing them due to their part in the child's death. After they finish this, they end up coming across a man named Kenyatta, who runs a group of militant Blacks intent on ridding the streets of drug dealers and racist cops. He manages to persuade the two into joining the group in order to kill a couple of racist cops as well as to hire them to perform a hit on a local drug dealer. Jackie and Billy stake out the drug dealer for a few days before killing him, unaware that their surveillance has been observed by a drug addict. The drug addict then goes to the police to report the crime with the intention of gaining the identity of the two men he had observed and selling it to the drug dealer's supplier. During this time Jackie and Billy have traveled to a farm where Kenyatta trains the organization's members. While they are there the two fall in love with some of the girls working from within the organization. Billy, Jackie, and the two girls they meet later travel back to Detroit, but are ambushed and killed.

=== Death List ===
Death List picks up immediately after the events in Crime Partners, with detectives Benson and Ryan discovering the bodies of Jackie, Billy, and their girlfriends. Meanwhile, Kenyatta has agreed to pay an arms dealer for a list of the city's drug suppliers, but must hold up a food stamp depot in order to pay him. Once he has the list, Kenyatta has one of his men knock off the people on the list one by one. This proves to be a relatively effective task with the exception of the man at the top of the list, who is elusive. He eventually manages to locate the man by way of a person that works in the supplier's apartment and has that person commit the hit. During all of this Benson and Ryan continue to investigate Kenyatta, eventually locating the farm he trains his members at. The book ends with Kenyatta and a few of his men hijacking an airplane while the police head towards the farm where most of the organization is currently located.

=== Kenyatta's Escape ===
The novel follows Kenyatta as he and part of his organization hijack a plane while the rest of his group are assaulted by the police and military at a farm. Much of the group at the farm are killed despite some surrendering, with only four people managing to survive and escape. The survivors make their way to an apartment in Chicago. Meanwhile, Kenyatta and his small group depart from Detroit, only to become involved in a mid-flight gun battle. As a result of the gun fight one of the pilots is shot, while the other one had already been killed. Despite being shot, the pilot manages to land the plane in the Nevada desert, where Kenyatta and his group appropriate some motorcycles from a nearby group of bikers. This leads to a fight, with some of the bikers getting killed. Kenyatta's group then steal a few cars and drive out to Los Angeles, where the FBI has brought in Detroit detectives Benson and Ryan, who had been following Kenyatta. The novel ends with a standoff at a gas station that sees Kenyatta's group dwindle even further as a large explosion takes out some police officers as well as a few of Kenyatta's people. Kenyatta and the surviving members of his group manage to escape the explosion and the incoming police officers just in time to avoid both death and capture.

=== Kenyatta's Last Hit ===
The final book in the series, Kenyatta's Last Hit takes place in Los Angeles a year after the events in the previous entry. Kenyatta has managed to form a new group of activists that share his goals to clean the streets of drug dealers and crooked cops. He has also managed to recruit Elliot Stone, a former college football player, to join him. Stone is later shot by a gang along with two of Kenyatta's men, with the gang also setting fire to the building that Stone is in. He manages to escape dying in the fire, but is taken to a hospital where Kenyatta's men are forced to rescue him. They take him to Kenyatta's hide out, where he quickly recovers. The Detroit detectives Benson and Ryan fly into Los Angeles after discovering that the two dead men are members of Kenyatta's group, but are paired with a crooked LA cop. This cop does whatever he can to undermine the investigation, killing several witnesses before being killed himself. Kenyatta later sets up a meeting with a major drug dealer, then kills the drug dealer's men and threatens to kill him unless he introduces Kenyatta to his supplier. The drug dealer sets up a meeting in Las Vegas, only for it to turn into a bloodbath. Despite Kenyatta's attempts, the supplier escapes via helicopter while Kenyatta and much of his militant group are shot and killed. The bodies are then dumped, with Benson and Ryan being called in to identify Kenyatta's corpse.

== Themes ==
The Kenyatta series deals with several themes such as drug usage and the idea of morality. The book also dealt with the idea of the exploitation of Black sex trade workers by white financiers as well as with the idea of African and African-American "cultural and political nationalism behind bars". In addition to Kenyatta seeking revenge against white police officers and financiers that he believes have wronged his people, the books also deal with the theme of black on black crime and the possible futility of one man attempting to clean up the ghettos in the absence of state or local government assistance.

In his book Low Road: The Life and Legacy of Donald Goines, Eddie B. Allen, Jr described the series as "symbolizing [Goines's] desire for victory" and "represented the strength and fearless determination that he lacked". Allen expressed disappointment over Kenyatta's death, as he saw the character as a representation of Goines's "desire to overcome his addiction to drugs" and because it "suggests that good can never defeat the larger societal evils that afflict our black communities."

== Film adaptation ==
Film rights to the Kenyatta series were purchased by Picture Perfect Films, with Kenneth McGriff intending to release all four books as a series of feature-length films. The first film, Crime Partners was released in 2003. The film starred Ice-T, Tyrin Turner, Charli Baltimore, Snoop Dogg, and Ja Rule, with Clifton Powell playing the character of Kenyatta. The film was directed by J. Jesses Smith, with McGriff producing. Producer Irv Gotti funded and marketed Crime Partner's soundtrack, with part of the funding being seized by the Federal government. Federal agents claimed that the soundtrack was one of several avenues used by Murder Inc. and Gotti to launder drug money. Though the film was released, its footage and unreleased soundtrack were seized by the government for their investigations into McGriff and Lorenzo.
