= Papa'z Song =

Single by 2Pac featuring Wycked

from the album Strictly 4 My N.I.G.G.A.Z...
- Released: January 17, 1994
- Recorded: 1992
- Genre: Hip-hop
- Length: 5:26
- Label: Interscope
- Songwriter: Tupac Shakur
- Producer: Big D the Impossible

2Pac singles chronology
"Keep Ya Head Up" (1993)	"Papa'z Song" (1994)	"Pour Out a Little Liquor" (1994)

Audio sample
- "Papa'z Song": file; help

Music video
- "Papa'z Song" on YouTube

"Papa'z Song" is a song by American rapper 2Pac from his second solo album, Strictly 4 My N.I.G.G.A.Z... (1993). It was released as the fourth and final single from the album. A music video was made for the single. The song peaked at number twenty four on the US Hot Rap Songs chart, number eighty two on the US Hot R&B/Hip-Hop Songs chart and number eighty seven on the US Billboard Hot 100.

The song features Mopreme Shakur under the stage name Wycked in the song, Shakur's older stepbrother and son of Mutulu Shakur.

== Music video ==
Both Tupac and Mopreme Shakur appear in the video. Actress Vivica A. Fox plays the mother in the music video's story. There are scenes of a husband and his wife arguing. They also act in front of the jail cell. The music video was shot in 1993.

== Track listing ==
1. "Papa'z Song"
2. "Dabastard's Remix"
3. "Vibe Tribe Remix"
4. "Peep Game" featuring Deadly Threat
5. "Cradle to the Grave"

== Charts ==
Chart (1993–1994)	Peak position
US Billboard Hot 100	87
US Hot R&B/Hip-Hop Songs (Billboard)	82

Chart (1994)	Peak position
US Hot Rap Songs (Billboard)	24
