= Daddy Cool (novel) =

Novel by Donald Goines

- First edition
- Author: Donald Goines
- Language: English
- Genre: Black literature, urban fiction
- Set in: Flint, Michigan, Detroit, Michigan
- Publisher: Holloway House Publishing Company
- Publication date: 1974
- Publication place: United States
- Pages: 217
- ISBN: 0870674641

Daddy Cool is a novel by African American writer Donald Goines. It has been described as a European cult classic and "the bible of rappers."

== Background ==
Daddy Cool was published in 1974, the year of Goines' death, along with five of his other novels.

In 1984, Daddy Cool was turned into a graphic novel, with text by comics veteran Don Glut and illustrations by Filipino comics artist Alfredo Alcala.

Holloway House reissued the book in 2003. A film adaptation was greenlit by ContentFilm in 2004, to be helmed by Never Die Alone director Ernest R. Dickerson, and rapper DMX expressed interest in a starting role. However, these plans never came to fruition.

== Plot ==
The novel tells the story of a Detroit hit man who, like the patriarch of Jane Austen’s Pride and Prejudice, has high aspirations for his daughter and teaches her in the arts he knows best, in this case knife wielding.

The novel opens with Daddy Cool carrying out a hit, and soon afterwards he learns that his daughter has run off with a pimp. He sends his two stepsons off to find her, but they are of little help. Daddy Cool takes a job in Los Angeles and while his personal problems slow him down, they do not stop him from carrying out his job. Upon his return to Detroit Daddy Cool learns that his daughter Janet has been turned out by her pimp and is running tricks on the street. Daddy Cool picks her up off the street and after two police nearly arrest him for soliciting prostitution, he gives her a large sum of money to keep her off the streets. Her pimp though has other plans and expects her to be back on the street the following night despite the large sum she has brought in.

Meanwhile, Daddy Cool's stepsons (Jimmy and Buddy) have taken to robbing to earn a living. They rip off a drug dealer, and one of the two brothers (Jimmy) rapes the drug dealer’s girl friend. They later knock off a numbers outfit run by a man named Big Jack, where Jimmy and Tiny (the third man in on the hold-up team) rape an adolescent girl. Buddy is disgusted by the act and when the two men go back for seconds he forces them to leave. Big Jack watches film of his girl being raped and knows who the men are. He calls Daddy Cool and asks him to perform a hit on his own stepsons. Daddy Cool agrees, but only kills Tiny and Jimmy, sparing Buddy because he forced the other two men to leave before raping the child a second time. After sending Buddy out of the country with a large sum of cash, Daddy Cool goes to visit his daughter but sees that his friend Earl has arrived already, and Daddy Cool instantly knows why Earl is there: to kill his daughter’s pimp. His daughter, upon seeing the corpse of the pimp she loved on the floor, chases after Earl into the street, where she finds that Earl has been shot by police, but also sees her father present and assumes that he sent Earl to kill her pimp.

The final scene of the novel sees the daughter using the knife-wielding lessons her father gave her to kill Daddy Cool. Daddy Cool has time to kill her first, but only takes out his knife so that Janet can claim self-defense.
