= Thug Life, Volume I =

Studio album by Thug Life
- Released: September 26, 1994
- Recorded: March 1993 – May 1994
- Studios: Blue Palm (North Hollywood); Echo Sound (Los Angeles)
- Genres: Gangsta rap; G-funk
- Length: 40:52
- Labels: Out da Gutta; Interscope; Atlantic
- Producers: Big Syke; Easy Mo Bee; Professor Jay; Johnny "J"; Nate Dogg; Mopreme; Stretch; Thug Music; Warren G

2Pac chronology
Strictly 4 My N.I.G.G.A.Z... (1993)	Thug Life, Volume I (1994)	Me Against the World (1995)

Singles from Thug Life, Volume I
- 1. "Pour Out a Little Liquor" Released: August 23, 1994; 2. "Cradle to the Grave" Released: November 4, 1994; 3. "Shit Don't Stop" Released: April 29, 1995; 4. "How Long Will They Mourn Me?" Released: July 29, 1995

Thug Life, Volume I is the only studio album by the American hip-hop group Thug Life. The album was released on September 26, 1994, by Interscope Records and Out da Gutta Records and distributed by Atlantic Records. The group, started by American rapper 2Pac, comprised 2Pac, his stepbrother Mopreme Shakur, and Stretch, who was heavily involved in 2Pac's previous two albums, Big Syke, The Rated R, and Macadoshis.

The album features guest appearances by Y.N.V. and Nate Dogg and production by Thug Music, comprising 2Pac and Stretch, Stretch himself, Professor Jay, Johnny "J", Warren G, and Easy Mo Bee. Since 1998, the album has been reissued by Amaru Entertainment. The album debuted at number 42 on the Billboard 200 and was certified gold by Recording Industry Association of America (RIAA).

== Background ==
In 2016, Mopreme Shakur, Macadoshis, and Big Syke, members of Thug Life, spoke exclusively to VladTV about how 2Pac heavily advocated for Interscope to sign them after he formed the group. Syke explained that it took a lot of persuading from 2Pac to convince the label to sign them and added that they then faced an uphill battle with censorship on the album, revealing that due to the heavy criticism of gangsta rap at the time, the original album wasn't what got released to the public. Speaking more about their debut project, Syke revealed that Thug Life was never supposed to be a group, it was supposed to be a movement, a compilation album represented by more rappers than what appeared on the album, one rapper being The Notorious B.I.G. He added that the idea of making Thug Life a group was thought up by Interscope Records during their rearranging of the album's tracks.

With many songs deemed by Interscope Records too controversial to release, the album only features ten songs, with two being solo songs by 2Pac and two not featuring the rapper. Since 2Pac died in 1996, many songs removed from the album have been released on the rapper's posthumous releases. One song recorded during the album's creation and scrapped due to its theme is Runnin', which features The Notorious B.I.G., Dramacydal, and Brown Man alongside 2Pac and Stretch of Thug Life. The song was officially released in November of the following year as a single from the compilation album One Million Strong with a different hook made by the West Coast Long Beach rapper Radio. In 2003, a remix of the song, with an alternate verse from 2Pac and featuring only The Notorious B.I.G., was released as a single from the soundtrack to the Academy Award-nominated documentary film Tupac: Resurrection.

== Singles ==
The first single, "Pour Out a Little Liquor" was released on August 23, 1994. It was first released on the soundtrack for the film Above the Rim earlier the same year.

The second single, "Cradle to the Grave", was released on November 4, 1994. An earlier version of which had been released that same year on 2Pac's "Papa'z Song" single.

A clean version of "How Long Will They Mourn Me?" was released as a promo single and music video in 1995, and in 1998, the album version appeared on 2Pac's Greatest Hits album.

As the original version of the album never came to fruition, the planned first single from the album, "Out on Bail" was never released, although 2Pac did perform it at the 1994 Source Awards, and it has since been remixed by Eminem and included on 2Pac's posthumous album Loyal to the Game.

== Critical reception ==
Professional ratings
Review scores
Source	Rating
AllMusic	3/5 stars
Entertainment Weekly	A−
Q	3/5 stars
Select	4/5

The album has been met with critical acclaim retrospectively as a classic underground rap album. "Full of machismo and do or die stances," wrote Jake Barnes in Q, "the lyrics' hardcore posturing is perversely undercut by sweet and delicate backings from artists like Curtis Mayfield, George Clinton and The Isley Brothers."

"A shockingly considered, thoughtful rap record," opined Select's Matt Hall. "And a very chilling one."

== Commercial performance ==
The album was certified gold on January 24, 1996, selling over 500,000 copies.

== Track listing ==
Eastside
No.	Title	Writer(s)	Producer(s)	Length
1.	"Bury Me a G" (featuring Natasha Walker of Y.N.V.)	Tupac Shakur; Diron Rivers; Tyruss Himes; Randy Walker; Maurice Harding; Ronald Isley; Ernie Isley; Chris Jasper; Marvin Isley; O'Kelly Isley; Rudolph Isley	Thug Music	4:58
2.	"Don't Get It Twisted"	Harding; Himes; Shakur; Walter Burns; James Gass	Jay; Mopreme	3:19
3.	"Shit Don't Stop" (featuring Y.N.V.)	Shakur; Harding; Burns; Rivers; Himes; George Clinton; Bernie Worrell; William Collins	Thug Music	3:46
4.	"Pour Out a Little Liquor"	Shakur; Kenneth Gamble; Leon Huff	Johnny "J"	3:29
5.	"Stay True"	Shakur; Walker; Harding; Curtis Mayfield	Thug Music	3:09

Westside
No.	Title	Writer(s)	Producer(s)	Length
6.	"How Long Will They Mourn Me?" (featuring Nate Dogg)	Shakur; Himes; Burns; Rivers; Gass; Warren Griffin	Warren G; Nate Dogg; Jay	3:52
7.	"Under Pressure"	Shakur; Walker	Thug Music	4:32
8.	"Street Fame"	Shakur; Harding; Himes; Burns; Delmar Arnaud	Stretch	4:00
9.	"Cradle to the Grave"	Shakur; Harding; Himes; Burns; Rivers	Jay; Big Syke	4:43
10.	"Str8 Ballin'"	Shakur; Collins; Clinton; Gary Cooper	Easy Mo Bee	5:04
Total length:				40:52

== Personnel ==
Thug Life

- 2Pac – vocals, lyrics, production
- Big Syke – vocals
- Mopreme Shakur – vocals
- Macadoshis - vocals
- The Rated R – vocals

== Charts ==
=== Weekly charts ===
Chart (1994–1995)	Peak position
US Billboard 200	42
US Top R&B/Hip-Hop Albums (Billboard)	6

=== Year-end charts ===
Chart (1995)	Position
US Top R&B/Hip-Hop Albums (Billboard)	35

== Certifications ==
Region	Certification	Certified units/sales
United States (RIAA)	Gold	500,000^{^}
^{^} Shipments figures based on certification alone.
