= Y?N-Vee =

Studio album by Y?N-Vee
- Released: October 18, 1994
- Recorded: November 1993–July 1994
- Genres: R&B, hip hop
- Length: 59:57
- Label: PMP/RAL/Def Jam
- Producers: Doug Rasheed, Oji Pierce, Alvin Oliver, Bryan WINO Dobbs, Brain G

Singles from Y?V-Vee (album)
- 1. "Chocolate" Released: August 16, 1994; 2. "I'm Goin' Down" Released: January 17, 1995; 3. "4Play" Released: March 28, 1995

Professional ratings
Review scores
| Source | Rating |
|---|---|
| Music Week | 2/5 stars |

Y?N-Vee is the only studio album by American R&B/hip-hop group Y?N-Vee (pronounced "why envy"). It was released on October 18, 1994 as the debut release from PMP Records through the Rush Associated Labels division of Def Jam Recordings, and was produced mostly by Doug Rasheed. The album spawned three singles, all of which went into rotation on BET, and two of which reached the UK Singles Chart.

== Release ==
The album was released on October 18, 1994. The group embarked on two promotional tours, visiting radio stations, clubs, and retailers as well as performing at Black colleges and radio station shows.

== Commercial performance ==
The album's lead single, "Chocolate", reached number 44 on the Billboard R&B Singles Chart dated October 29, 1994. On the chart dated November 12, 1994, it reached number one on the Bubbling Under Hot 100 Singles chart, an extension of the Hot 100. "I'm Going Down" reached the Bubbling Under Hot R&B Singles chart.

Two of the album's singles charted in the United Kingdom, with "Chocolate" peaking at number 65 and follow-up "I'm Going Down" reaching number 76.

The music video for "Chocolate" went into rotation on BET, reaching number 9 on the weekly video play chart for the week ending October 16, 1994. The music video for the album's second single, "I'm Going Down", was added to BET's rotation for the week ending December 11, 1994, while the third single, "4Play", was added for the week ending April 30, 1995.

== Track listing ==
1. "Even When U Sleep" - 3:47
2. "All I Wanna Do" - 4:44
3. "4Play" - 4:37
4. "I'm Goin' Down" - 4:08
5. "Sceamin'" - 5:28
6. "Sonshine's Groove" - 5:19
7. "Chocolate" - 4:25
8. "Stra8 Hustler" - 3:45
9. "Tricks-N-Trainin'" - 4:40
10. "Y?N-Vee" - 4:37
11. "Real G" - 4:56
12. "Gangsta's Prayer" - 4:53
13. "We Got a Good Thing" - 4:38
