= Mopreme Shakur =

American rapper (born 1967)

- Also known as: Mo' Komani; Mopreme Shakur; Wycked; Mocedes
- Born: Maurice Harding; August 16, 1967 (age 59); New York City, New York, U.S.
- Genres: Hip hop; gangsta rap
- Occupation: Rapper
- Years active: 1989–present
- Labels: Interscope; Jive; Out da Gutta; Death Row
- Formerly of: Thug Life; Outlawz
- Parent(s): Mutulu Shakur; Sharan Harding
- Relatives: Ayize Jama-Everett (half-brother); Tupac Shakur (stepbrother); Afeni Shakur (stepmother); Kastro (stepcousin)

Maurice "Mopreme" Shakur (né Harding; born August 16, 1967), sometimes credited as Mutulu Shakur Jr. or "Little Mutulu"; and formerly known as Wycked or Mocedes, is an American rapper. He was a member of the hip-hop group Thug Life and is the stepbrother of rapper Tupac Shakur. He was also a member of the Outlawz (under the name Komani). Shakur's memoir, This Thug's Life, was published in 2026.

== Career ==
Mopreme made his recording debut as Mocedes The Mellow on Tony Toni Toné's 1990 single "Feels Good". He appeared with his stepbrother Tupac on "Papa'z Song", a single from the 1993 album Strictly 4 My N.I.G.G.A.Z., credited as 'Wycked'.

Mopreme and Tupac formed the group Thug Life in 1993, with Big Syke, Macadoshis, and Rated R. The group released one album, Thug Life, Volume I (1994), which went gold. Mopreme wrote many of the songs on this album. He was also an original member of Outlawz (with his stepcousin Kastro; alongside Tupac and others), but dropped out of the group.

In 2007, he released a mixtape with Assassin, "Black & Brown Pride". He performed on the soundtrack for the feature film Intoxicating, starring Kirk Harris, John Savage, and Eric Roberts. In 2008, Mopreme was a consulting producer for an episode about his father Mutulu Shakur, on the BET series American Gangster. In 2024, it was announced that Mopreme is executive producing the upcoming biopic Van Gogh, an artist who was a source of inspiration for his brother Tupac. The script was written by Kira Madallo Sesay, who is also a producer on the film.

== Media appearances ==
In October 2024, Shakur appeared on Piers Morgan Uncensored to discuss his family's renewed investigation into the 1996 murder of Tupac Shakur. In the interview, Morgan continually pressed Shakur on whether there was credibility in the widely held belief that Sean Combs, also known as Diddy – arrested in September 2024 on racketeering and sex trafficking charges – was in some way involved in Tupac's murder in New York nearly three decades earlier. While acknowledging the multiple rumors of Diddy's complicity, Shakur neither affirmed nor denied them, but stated that the Shakur family had recently hired notable lawyer Alex Spiro, who has represented high-profile clients such as Elon Musk and Jay-Z. Morgan asked Shakur whether the recent charges filed against Diddy were a catalyst for re-opening his brother's murder case. Shakur stated that Spiro was hired months before Diddy's arrest, and that his family has suffered immeasurably for so long that all they want is to "get to the truth" so that they can finally have some closure.

== Discography ==
Collaborative albums

- Thug Life, Volume I (with Thug Life) (1994)
  - Chart position: #6 R&B/Hip-Hop, #42 Billboard 200
  - RIAA certification: Gold

Compilation albums

- Black & Brown Pride (with Assassin) (2007)

Mixtapes

- Thug Life: Demo Tape (with Thug Life) (1994)
- Evolution of a Thug Life N.I.G.G.A. Vol. 1.1 (2005)
- Evolution of a Thug Life N.I.G.G.A. Vol. 1.2 (2005)

Guest appearances

List of non-single guest appearances, with other performing artists, showing year released and album name
| Title | Year | Artist(s) | Album |
|---|---|---|---|
| "Feels Good" | 1990 | Tony! Toni! Toné! | The Revival |
| "Papa'z Song" | 1993 | 2Pac | Strictly 4 My N.I.G.G.A.Z. |
| "Stormy Weather" | 1995 | Ray Luv | Forever Hustlin' |
| "When We Ride" | 1996 | 2Pac, Hussein Fatal, Napoleon, Big Syke, Kastro, E.D.I. Mean, Yaki Kadafi | All Eyez on Me |
| "Ain't No Love " | 1996 | Big Syke, G-Money | Be Yo' Self |
| "Thug Thang" | 2000 | Little Bruce, Big Syke, Kastro | Give It To Me Baby! |
| "M.O.B." | 2001 | 2Pac, Hussein Fatal, Yaki Kadafi, Big Syke | Until the End of Time |
| "Who You Trust" | 2001 | Big Syke, E.D.I., Kastro | Thug Law: Thug Life Outlawz Chapter 1 |
| "I Need A..." | 2001 | Mac Mall, Sundae, Big Syke | Thug Law: Thug Life Outlawz Chapter 1 |
| "Do That" | 2001 | Swerv, Big Syke | Thug Law: Thug Life Outlawz Chapter 1 |
| "Thug Cycosis" | 2001 | The Rated R, Macadoshis, Big Syke | Thug Law: Thug Life Outlawz Chapter 1 |
| "2 Places" | 2006 | Taje, Kwest | Hot Box: Vol. 1 |
| "Another Time" | 2007 | Kyle Rifkin | Hell Up in Harlem |
| "When I Close My Eyes" | 2007 | Macadoshis, Noni Spitz, Taje | Tha Come Up |
| "Everyday Iz A Struggle" | 2007 | Macadoshis, G-Money, Big Syke | Tha Come Up |
| "Win or Lose" | 2007 | Taje | Hot Box 2: The Second Hit |
| "Death Before Dishonor" | 2008 | Bishop Lamont, Taje, Indef | Tupac Assassination: Conspiracy or Revenge |
| "Haven't Seen U Smile" | 2008 | Imaan Faith Big Syke | —N/a |
| "Poppin' Tops" | 2009 | Taje | Hot Box 3: Hold Ya Breath |
| "Svarta Pengar" | 2012 | Emilush & Caustic, Alibi | —N/a |
| "Don't Stop" | 2012 | Bishop Lamont | The Layover |
