= Thug Life (group) =

American hip hop group

- From left to right: Big Syke, Mopreme, 2Pac, Macadoshis, The Rated R

Background information
- Origin: Los Angeles, California, U.S.
- Genres: West Coast hip-hop; gangsta rap; G-funk
- Years active: 1993–1995
- Labels: Out da Gutta; Interscope; Atlantic
- Spinoffs: Outlawz
- Past members: Tupac Shakur (deceased); Big Syke (deceased); Mopreme Shakur; Macadoshis; The Rated R; Big Stretch (deceased)

Thug Life was an American hip hop group that consisted of 2Pac, Big Syke, Mopreme, Macadoshis, and The Rated R formed in Los Angeles, California. They released one album, 1994's Thug Life, Volume I, before disbanding in 1995. Tupac Shakur, Mopreme Shakur, and Big Syke later became members of the Outlawz.

== Concept and Philosophy ==
The acronym THUG LIFE ("The Hate U Gave Little Infants, Fucks Everybody") was conceptualized by Shakur as a commentary on the cycle of systemic injustice. It posits that the marginalization experienced by children in impoverished communities eventually results in negative societal consequences that affect all demographics.

=== Code of Thug Life ===
In 1992, Tupac Shakur and Mutulu Shakur authored the "Code of Thug Life," a 26-point social contract intended to reduce mindless violence and establish a moral framework within inner-city culture. The code was formally adopted at a "Truce Convention" in California and aimed to regulate gang activity by prohibiting the targeting of civilians, children, and elderly residents.

Key mandates of the code included:

1. All "New Jacks" must acknowledge the inherent risks of the lifestyle: wealth, imprisonment, or death.
2. Crew leaders are held responsible for financial and legal commitments to their members.
3. Cooperation with law enforcement ("ratting") is strictly prohibited.
4. Disputes between crews are to be handled via designated diplomats to maintain unity.
5. "Car jacking" and drug distribution ("slinging") within the community's own neighborhood are forbidden.
6. The protection of vulnerable populations, specifically prohibiting drug sales to children or pregnant women.
7. Schools, parties, and concerts are designated as "neutral territories" where violence is prohibited.
8. Civilians, families in their homes, and the elderly are protected from targeting or abuse.
9. Sexual assault and "senseless brutality" are explicitly condemned.
10. A mandate for members to "protect yourself at all times."

== History ==
=== Formation and early years (1993) ===
Thug Life was formed in 1992 by Tupac Shakur, along with Randy "Stretch" Walker, and Tyruss "Big Syke" Himes. Himes adopted the stage name Big Syke upon joining. The group's lineup later expanded to include Macadoshis (Diron Rivers), The Rated R (Walter Burns), and Tupac's stepbrother Mopreme Shakur, who performed as "The Wycked."

Prior to signing with Interscope Records, Shakur met with Eazy-E in 1993 to discuss a potential deal with Ruthless Records. Negotiations reportedly stalled because Eazy-E requested a name change to avoid confusion with his recent signing, Bone Thugs-n-Harmony. The collaboration never materialized due to Eazy-E's death in March 1995.

=== Thug Life, Volume I (1994) ===
The group's only studio album, Thug Life, Volume I, was released on September 26, 1994, through Interscope and Shakur's Out da Gutta label. The lead single, "Pour Out a Little Liquor," originally appeared on the Above the Rim soundtrack. The album reached #42 on the Billboard 200. As of 2011, it had sold over 497,000 copies in the United States.

=== Disbandment and legacy ===
The group effectively disbanded in 1995 following Shakur's incarceration. On November 30, 1995, founding member Randy "Stretch" Walker was killed in a drive-by shooting in Queens Village. Big Syke later joined the Outlawz as "Mussolini" before dying in 2016.

In April 2026, the estate of Mutulu Shakur, led by Mopreme Shakur, initiated legal proceedings against Duane "Keffe D" Davis. The litigation cited allegations from the 2025 Netflix documentary Sean Combs: The Reckoning regarding a conspiracy related to the 1996 homicide of Tupac Shakur.

== Members ==
- Tupac Shakur (d. 1996)
- Big Syke (d. 2016)
- Mopreme Shakur
- Macadoshis
- The Rated R
- Randy "Stretch" Walker (d. 1995)

== Discography ==
=== Studio albums ===
- Thug Life, Volume I (1994)
