= Tupac Shakur discography =

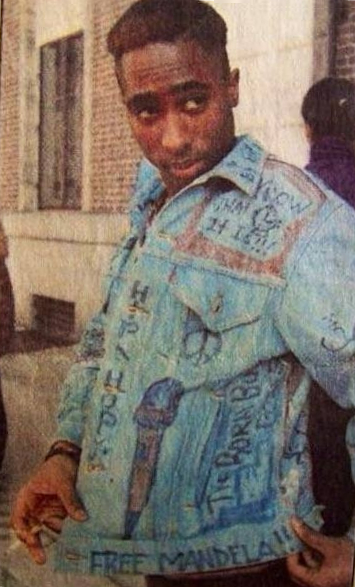
- Shakur in 1988 wearing a jeans jacket with several hand drawn messages, including his first rap group Born Busy
- Studio albums: 4
- Soundtrack albums: 1
- Compilation albums: 9
- Singles: 44
- Music videos: 50
- Posthumous albums: 7
- Remix albums: 2

The discography of American rapper Tupac Shakur consists of 10 studio albums. Throughout his career and posthumously, Shakur sold more than 75 million records worldwide. He has scored 5 No. 1 albums on the Billboard 200 and 8 No. 1 albums on the Top R&B/Hip-Hop Albums chart.

Shakur began his commercial music career in the early 1990s, initially starting as a dancer and roadie for the hip-hop group Digital Underground until he gained recognition as a rapper on the group's single "Same Song". Shakur released his debut studio album, 2Pacalypse Now, in November 1991. The album peaked at number 64 on the United States Billboard 200 and has since been recognized as a groundbreaking work of the hip-hop genre. Its singles included "Brenda's Got a Baby" and "Trapped", both of which highlighted Shakur's focus on social issues. Strictly 4 My N.I.G.G.A.Z., Shakur's second studio album, was released in February 1993 and saw him collaborating with artists such as Ice Cube and Ice-T. The album peaked at number 24 on the Billboard 200 and earned a Platinum certification from the Recording Industry Association of America (RIAA). Notable singles from the album include "I Get Around" and "Keep Ya Head Up", both of which reached the top ten on the Billboard Hot Rap Songs chart.

Shakur's third studio album, Me Against the World, released while the rapper was incarcerated in March 1995, marked a significant milestone in his career. The album debuted at number 1 on the Billboard 200 and featured the hit single "Dear Mama", which became one of Shakur's most iconic songs. Me Against the World was certified double Platinum by the RIAA, and is often cited as one of the greatest hip-hop albums of all time, as well as being the first number 1 album from an artist in prison. All Eyez on Me, a double album, was released in February 1996. It topped the Billboard 200 and included international hits such as "California Love" and "How Do U Want It", both of which reached the top of the Billboard Hot 100. All Eyez on Me was certified Diamond by the RIAA and solidified Shakur's status as a rap superstar.

Following his death in September 1996, several posthumous albums were released, starting with The Don Killuminati: The 7 Day Theory, released under the alias Makaveli in November 1996. The album debuted at number 1 and featured the singles "Hail Mary" and "To Live & Die in L.A." It was certified quadruple Platinum by the RIAA and is regarded as one of Shakur's most profound works. Additional posthumous albums include R U Still Down? (Remember Me) (1997), Still I Rise (1999, with Outlawz), Until the End of Time (2001), Better Dayz (2002), Loyal to the Game (2004), and Pac's Life (2006). Each of these albums continued to achieve commercial success, with several reaching the top of the Billboard charts and earning multiple Platinum certifications.

Throughout his career and posthumously, Shakur sold over 75 million records worldwide, making him one of the best-selling music artists of all time. In 2001, Guinness World Records hailed him as the best-selling rap artist in the US. According to the RIAA, he has sold 37.5 million albums in the United States, with an additional 4 million under his alias Makaveli, making him the second best-selling hip-hop artist in history.

== Albums ==
=== Studio albums ===
List of studio albums, with selected chart positions, sales figures and certifications
Title	Album details	Peak chart positions										Sales	Certifications
Title	Album details	US	US R&B	AUS	CAN	FRA	GER	NLD	NZ	SWI	UK	Sales	Certifications
2Pacalypse Now	Released: November 12, 1991; Labels: TNT, Interscope; Formats: CD, LP, cassette, digital download	64	13	—	—	—	—	—	—	—	—	US: 923,455 (Note: Sales in the United States as of September 16, 2011.)	RIAA: Gold
Strictly 4 My N.I.G.G.A.Z...	Released: February 16, 1993; Labels: TNT, Interscope, Atlantic; Formats: CD, LP, cassette, digital download	24	4	—	—	—	—	—	—	—	—	US: 1,639,584	RIAA: Platinum; BPI: Silver; RMNZ: Gold
Me Against the World	Released: March 14, 1995; Labels: Out da Gutta, Interscope, Atlantic; Formats: CD, LP, cassette, digital download	1	1	93	20	—	23	—	—	—	90	US: 3,524,567	RIAA: 2× Platinum; BPI: Gold; RMNZ: Gold
All Eyez on Me	Released: February 13, 1996; Labels: Death Row, Interscope; Formats: CD, LP, cassette, digital download	1	1	19	10	99	16	11	15	15	32	US: 5,887,630	RIAA: Diamond (10× Platinum); ARIA: Gold; BPI: Platinum; MC: Platinum; RMNZ: 3× Platinum
"—" denotes a recording that did not chart or was not released in that territory.

=== Posthumous albums ===
List of posthumous albums, with selected chart positions, sales figures and certifications
Title	Album details	Peak chart positions										Sales	Certifications
Title	Album details	US	US R&B	AUS	CAN	FRA	GER	NLD	NZ	SWI	UK	Sales	Certifications
The Don Killuminati: The 7 Day Theory	Released: November 5, 1996; Labels: Makaveli, Death Row, Interscope; Formats: CD, LP, cassette, digital download	1	1	37	25	—	76	61	17	—	53	US: 3,911,787	RIAA: 4× Platinum; BPI: Gold; MC: Gold
R U Still Down? (Remember Me)	Released: November 25, 1997; Labels: Amaru, Jive, Interscope; Formats: CD, LP, cassette, digital download	2	1	50	12	52	25	29	20	—	44	US: 2,166,117	RIAA: 4× Platinum; BPI: Gold; NVPI: Gold; RMNZ: Gold
Still I Rise (with Outlawz)	Released: December 13, 1999; Label: Interscope; Formats: CD, LP, cassette, digital download	6	2	48	9	—	24	—	49	86	75	US: 1,692,316	RIAA: Platinum; BPI: Gold; MC: Gold
Until the End of Time	Released: March 27, 2001; Labels: Amaru, Death Row, Interscope; Formats: CD, LP, cassette, digital download	1	1	37	2	23	25	10	24	34	33	US: 2,220,589	RIAA: 4× Platinum; BPI: Gold; MC: 2× Platinum
Better Dayz	Released: November 26, 2002; Labels: Amaru, Death Row, Interscope; Formats: CD, LP, cassette, digital download	5	1	51	7	52	45	36	20	60	68	US: 1,765,597	RIAA: 3× Platinum; BPI: Gold; MC: 3× Platinum
Loyal to the Game	Released: December 14, 2004; Labels: Amaru, Interscope; Formats: CD, LP, cassette, digital download	1	1	21	7	55	50	44	31	21	20	US: 1,204,124	RIAA: Platinum; BPI: Gold; RMNZ: Gold
Pac's Life	Released: November 21, 2006; Labels: Amaru, Interscope; Formats: CD, LP, digital download	9	3	76	19	83	71	—	—	62	90	US: 469,639	BPI: Silver
"—" denotes a recording that did not chart or was not released in that territory.

=== Live albums ===
List of live albums, with selected chart positions and certifications
Title	Album details	Peak chart positions						Certifications
Title	Album details	US	US R&B	FRA	GER	IRL	UK	Certifications
2Pac Live	Released: August 10, 2004; Label: Death Row, Koch; Formats: CD, LP, cassette, digital download	54	16	84	86	52	67	
Live at the House of Blues	Released: September 20, 2005; Labels: Death Row, Koch; Formats: CD, cassette, digital download	159	48	179	—	—	—	RIAA: Platinum; ARIA: Gold; BPI: Gold
"—" denotes a recording that did not chart or was not released in that territory.

=== Compilation albums ===
List of compilation albums, with selected chart positions, sales figures and certifications
Title	Album details	Peak chart positions										Sales	Certifications
Title	Album details	US	US R&B	AUS	BEL (FL)	CAN	GER	NLD	NZ	SWI	UK	Sales	Certifications
Greatest Hits	Released: November 24, 1998; Labels: Amaru, Death Row, Interscope, Jive; Formats: CD, LP, cassette, digital download	3	1	11	3	18	9	1	19	13	17	US: 5,330,000	RIAA: Diamond; ARIA: 2× Platinum; BEA: Gold; BPI: 3× Platinum; BVMI: Gold; IFPI SWI: Gold; MC: Platinum; NVPI: Platinum; RMNZ: 2× Platinum
The Prophet: The Best of the Works	Released: July 7, 2003; Label: Death Row; Formats: CD, LP, cassette, digital download	—	—	—	—	—	—	—	40	—	146	US: 90,000	RMNZ: Platinum
The Prophet Returns	Released: October 3, 2005; Labels: Death Row, Universal; Formats: CD, LP, cassette	—	—	—	—	—	—	—	—	—	163	US: 45,000	
Beginnings: The Lost Tapes 1988–1991	Released: June 12, 2007; Label: Koch; Formats: CD, digital download	—	—	—	—	—	—	—	—	—	—	US: 55,000	
Best of 2Pac, Part 1: Thug	Released: December 4, 2007; Labels: Amaru, Death Row, Interscope, Universal Music Group; Formats: CD, digital download	65	13	—	—	—	—	—	—	—	76	US: 212,399	BPI: Silver
Best of 2Pac, Part 2: Life	Released: December 4, 2007; Labels: Amaru, Death Row, Interscope, Universal Music Group; Formats: CD, digital download	77	15	—	—	—	—	—	—	—	105	US: 135,429	BPI: Silver
"—" denotes a recording that did not chart or was not released in that territory.

=== Remix albums ===
List of remix albums, with selected chart positions
Title	Album details	Peak chart positions			
Title	Album details	US	US R&B	AUS	UK
Nu-Mixx Klazzics	Released: October 7, 2003 (US); Label: Death Row, Koch; Formats: CD, cassette	15	5	85	114
Nu-Mixx Klazzics Vol. 2	Released: July 3, 2007 (US); Labels: Death Row, Koch; Formats: CD, digital download	45	8	—	—
"—" denotes a recording that did not chart or was not released in that territory.

=== Soundtrack albums ===
List of soundtrack albums, with selected chart positions, sales figures and certifications
Title	Album details	Peak chart positions										Sales	Certifications
Title	Album details	US	US R&B	AUS	CAN	FRA	GER	IRL	NLD	SWI	UK	Sales	Certifications
Tupac: Resurrection	Released: November 11, 2003; Label: Amaru; Formats: CD, LP, cassette, digital download	2	3	75	3	57	76	25	36	68	62	US: 1,666,335	RIAA: Platinum; BPI: Gold

=== Video albums ===
List of video albums, with selected chart positions and certifications
Title	Album details	Peak chart positions	Certifications
Title	Album details	US Video	Certifications
Thug Angel	Released: 2002; Label: QD3 Entertainment; Formats: DVD	—	RIAA: Platinum; ARIA: 2× Platinum; BPI: Gold
Live at the House of Blues	Released: October 4, 2005 (US); Label: Eagle Vision; Formats: DVD, UMD	3	RIAA: Platinum; ARIA: Gold; BPI: Gold
The Complete Live Performances	Released: 2006; Label: Eagle Vision; Formats: DVD	—	ARIA: Gold

== Singles ==
=== As lead artist ===
‡	Denotes promotional single

List of singles as lead artist, with selected chart positions and certifications, showing year released and album name
Title	Year	Peak chart positions										Certifications	Album
Title	Year	US	US R&B	US Rap	AUS	GER	NLD	NZ	SWE	SWI	UK	Certifications	Album
"Trapped"	1991	—	—	—	—	—	—	—	—	—	—		2Pacalypse Now
"Brenda's Got a Baby" ‡	1991	—	23	3 (Note: "Brenda's Got a Baby" and "If My Homie Calls" charted as a double A-side single on the Billboard Hot Rap Singles chart.)	—	—	—	—	—	—	—		2Pacalypse Now
"If My Homie Calls"/"Brenda's Got a Baby"	1992	—	—	3	—	—	—	—	—	—	—		2Pacalypse Now
"Holler If Ya Hear Me"	1993	—	— (Note: "Holla If Ya Hear Me" did not enter the Hot R&B/Hip-Hop Songs chart, but peaked at number ten on the Bubbling Under R&B/Hip-Hop Singles chart, which acts as an extension to the Hot R&B/Hip-Hop Songs chart.)	—	—	—	—	—	—	—	—		Strictly 4 My N.I.G.G.A.Z...
"I Get Around" (featuring Digital Underground)	1993	11	5	8	—	—	—	—	—	—	—	RIAA: Platinum; RMNZ: Platinum	Strictly 4 My N.I.G.G.A.Z...
"Keep Ya Head Up" (featuring Dave Hollister)	1993	12	7	2	—	—	—	—	—	—	—	RIAA: Platinum; BPI: Silver; RMNZ: 2× Platinum	Strictly 4 My N.I.G.G.A.Z...
"Papa'z Song" (featuring Wycked)	1994	87	82	24	—	—	—	—	—	—	—		Strictly 4 My N.I.G.G.A.Z...
"Dear Mama"	1995	9	3	1	37	81	31	4	43	43	27	RIAA: 3× Platinum; BPI: Gold; RMNZ: 2× Platinum	Me Against the World
"So Many Tears"	1995	44	11	3	—	—	—	—	—	—	—	RMNZ: Gold	Me Against the World
"Temptations"	1995	68	35	13	—	—	—	—	—	—	—		Me Against the World
"California Love" (featuring Dr. Dre and Roger Troutman)	1995	1 (Note: "California Love" and "How Do U Want It" charted as a double A-side single in the United States.)	1	1	4	7	7	1	1	7	6	RIAA: 2× Platinum; ARIA: Gold; BPI: 2× Platinum; BVMI: Gold; RMNZ: 5× Platinum; MC: Gold	All Eyez on Me (UK Edition)
"2 of Amerikaz Most Wanted" ‡ (featuring Snoop Doggy Dogg)	1996	—	— (Note: "2 of Amerikaz Most Wanted" did not enter the Hot R&B/Hip-Hop Songs chart, but peaked at number 46 on the Hot R&B/Hip-Hop Airplay chart.)	—	—	—	—	—	—	—	—	BPI: Silver; RMNZ: 2× Platinum	All Eyez on Me
"How Do U Want It" (featuring K-Ci & JoJo)	1996	1	1	1	24	74	—	2	33	37	17	RIAA: 2× Platinum; ARIA: Gold; BPI: Silver; RMNZ: 2× Platinum	All Eyez on Me
"I Ain't Mad at Cha" (featuring Danny Boy)	1996	— (Note: "I Ain't Mad at Cha" did not enter the Billboard Hot 100, but peaked at number 58 on the Hot 100 Airplay chart.)	— (Note: "I Ain't Mad at Cha" did not enter the Hot R&B/Hip-Hop Songs chart, but peaked at number 18 on the Hot R&B/Hip-Hop Airplay chart.)	18	47	86	15	2	35	7	13	BPI: Silver; RMNZ: Platinum	All Eyez on Me
"Toss It Up" (featuring Danny Boy, K-Ci & JoJo and Aaron Hall)	1996	—	—	—	39	—	—	7	—	—	15	RMNZ: Gold	The Don Killuminati: The 7 Day Theory
"To Live & Die in L.A." (featuring Val Young)	1996	—	—	—	82	—	—	9	—	—	10		The Don Killuminati: The 7 Day Theory
"Hail Mary" (featuring Outlawz and Prince Ital Joe)	1997	—	—	—	—	—	—	—	—	—	43	BPI: Gold; RMNZ: Platinum	The Don Killuminati: The 7 Day Theory
"Wanted Dead or Alive" (with Snoop Doggy Dogg)	1997	—	—	—	41	—	—	3	—	—	16		Gridlock'd soundtrack
"I Wonder If Heaven Got a Ghetto"	1997	67	14	18	70	—	—	11	—	—	21		R U Still Down? (Remember Me)
"Do for Love" (featuring Eric Williams)	1998	21	10	2	52	—	18	18	33	—	12	RIAA: Gold; BPI: Platinum; RMNZ: 2× Platinum	R U Still Down? (Remember Me)
"Changes" (featuring Talent)	1998	32	12	—	7	2	1	3	1	2	3	BPI: 2× Platinum; BVMI: Gold; IFPI SWE: Gold; IFPI SWI: Gold; NVPI: Gold; RMNZ: 4× Platinum	Greatest Hits
"Unconditional Love" ‡	1999	—	—	—	—	—	—	—	—	—	—		Greatest Hits
"Baby Don't Cry (Keep Ya Head Up II)" (with Outlawz)	2000	72	36	—	—	25	22	35	—	55	—		Still I Rise
"Until the End of Time" (featuring R.L.)	2001	52	21	—	34	33	11	—	53	24	4	BPI: Silver	Until the End of Time
"Letter 2 My Unborn"	2001	—	64	—	—	76	61	—	—	—	21		Until the End of Time
"Thugz Mansion" (featuring Nas and J. Phoenix)	2002	19	10	4	26	74	73	10	—	—	24	RMNZ: 2× Platinum	Better Dayz
"Still Ballin" ‡ (featuring Trick Daddy)	2003	69	31	15	—	—	—	—	—	—	—		Better Dayz
"Runnin' (Dying to Live)" (featuring The Notorious B.I.G.)	2003	19	11	5	—	12	13	—	—	9	17	RMNZ: Gold	Tupac: Resurrection soundtrack
"One Day at a Time (Em's Version)" ‡ (with Eminem, featuring Outlawz)	2004	80	51	22	—	—	—	—	—	—	134		Tupac: Resurrection soundtrack
"Thugs Get Lonely Too" ‡ (featuring Nate Dogg)	2004	98	55	—	—	—	—	—	—	—	—		Loyal to the Game
"Ghetto Gospel" (featuring Elton John)	2005	—	—	—	1	3	—	3	—	7	1	ARIA: Platinum; BPI: Platinum; BVMI: Gold; RMNZ: 2× Platinum	Loyal to the Game
"Untouchable (Swizz Beatz Remix)" ‡ (featuring Bone Thugs-n-Harmony)	2006	—	91	—	—	—	—	—	—	—	—		Pac's Life
"Pac's Life" (featuring T.I. and Ashanti)	2006	— (Note: "Pac's Life" did not enter the Billboard Hot 100, but peaked at number 19 on the Bubbling Under Hot 100 Singles chart, which acts as an extension to the Hot 100.)	81	—	34	31	—	38	—	—	21	RMNZ: Gold	Pac's Life
"—" denotes a recording that did not chart or was not released in that territory.

=== As featured artist ===
List of singles as featured artist, with selected chart positions and certifications, showing year released and album name
Title	Year	Peak chart positions				Certifications	Album
Title	Year	US	US R&B	US Rap	NLD	Certifications	Album
"Same Song" (Digital Underground featuring 2Pac)	1991						This Is an EP Release
"Call It What U Want" (Above the Law featuring 2Pac and Money-B)	1992	—	—	—	—		Black Mafia Life
"Gotta Get Mine" (MC Breed featuring 2Pac)	1993	96	61	6	—		The New Breed
"Wussup wit the Love"(Digital Underground featuring 2Pac)	1993						The Body-Hat Syndrome
"Dusted 'n' Disgusted" (E-40featuring Spice 1, Mac Mall, Levitti, 2Pac)	1995						In a Major Way
"Smile" (Scarface featuring 2Pac and Johnny P)	1997	12	4	2	—	RIAA: Gold	The Untouchable
"Thug Luv" (Bone Thugs-n-Harmony featuring 2Pac)	1997	—	— (Note: "Thug Luv" did not enter the Hot R&B/Hip-Hop Songs chart, but peaked at number 60 on the Hot R&B/Hip-Hop Airplay chart.)	—	—	RMNZ: Gold	The Art of War
"Homies & Thuggs" (Scarface featuring Master P and 2Pac)	1998	—	—	—	—		My Homies
"Are U Still Down" (Jon B. featuring 2Pac)	1998	—	—	—	—	RIAA: Platinum	Cool Relax
"Worldwide" (Remix) (Outlawz featuring 2Pac, Bosko and T-Low)	2001	—	—	—	56		Novakane
"California" (Remix) (Sly Boogy featuring Mack 10, Jayo Felony, E-40, Kurupt, Crooked I, Roscoe and 2Pac)	2003	—	—	—	—		Non-album singles
"Hip Hop" (Inspiration Remix) (Royce da 5'9" featuring Big Pun, Big L, The Notorious B.I.G. and 2Pac)	2004	—	—	—	—		Non-album singles
"Playa Cardz Right" (Keyshia Cole featuring 2Pac)	2008	63	9	—	—		A Different Me
"—" denotes a recording that did not chart or was not released in that territory.

== Other charted and certified songs ==
List of songs, with selected chart positions, showing year released and album name
Title	Year	Peak chart positions				Certifications	Album
Title	Year	US R&B	FRA	HUN	RUS	Certifications	Album
"Can U Get Away"	1995	— (Note: "Can U Get Away" did not enter the Hot R&B/Hip-Hop Songs chart, but peaked at number 70 on the Hot R&B/Hip-Hop Airplay chart.)	—	—	—		Me Against the World
"Me Against The World" (featuring Dramacydal)	1995	—	—	—	—	RMNZ: Gold	Me Against the World
"Ambitionz az a Ridah"	1996	—	—	—	—	BPI: Platinum; BVMI: Gold; RMNZ: 4× Platinum	All Eyez on Me
"All Eyez on Me" (featuring Big Syke)	1996	—	—	—	22	BPI: Platinum; BVMI: Gold; RMNZ: 3× Platinum	All Eyez on Me
"Life Goes On"	1996	—	—	—	—	RMNZ: Platinum	All Eyez on Me
"Picture Me Rollin'" (featuring Danny Boy, Big Syke, and CPO)	1996	—	—	—	—	RMNZ: Platinum	All Eyez on Me
"All About U" (featuring Snoop Doggy Dogg, Nate Dogg and Dru Down)	1996	—	—	—	—	RMNZ: 2× Platinum	All Eyez on Me
"Thug Passion" (featuring Dramacydal, Jewell, and Storm)	1996	—	—	—	—	RMNZ: Gold	All Eyez on Me
"Wonda Why They Call U Bytch"	1996	—	—	—	—	RMNZ: Gold	All Eyez on Me
"Shorty Wanna Be A Thug"	1996	—	—	—	—	RMNZ: Gold	All Eyez on Me
"Ratha Be Ya Nigga" (featuring Richie Rich)	1996	—	—	—	—	RMNZ: Platinum	All Eyez on Me
"Run Tha Streetz" (featuring Michel'le, Mutah, and Storm)	1996	—	—	—	—	RMNZ: Gold	All Eyez on Me
"Can't C Me" (featuring George Clinton)	1996	—	—	—	—	RMNZ: Platinum	All Eyez on Me
"Only God Can Judge Me" (featuring Rappin' 4-Tay)	1996	—	—	—	—	RMNZ: Platinum	All Eyez on Me
"Hit 'Em Up"	1996	—	—	38	—	BPI: Platinum; BVMI: Gold; RMNZ: 5× Platinum	"How Do U Want It" single
"Wherever U R (Sho' Shot)" (featuring Big Daddy Kane)	1996	—	—	—	—		One Nation (unreleased)
"Who Do You Believe In?" (featuring Yaki Kadafi and Big Pimpin' Delemond)	1999	53	—	—	—		Suge Knight Represents: Chronic 2000
"Thug Nature"	2000	56	—	—	—		Too Gangsta for Radio
"Lil' Homies"	2001	—	—	—	—	RMNZ: Gold	Until the End of Time
"Unchained (The Payback / Untouchable)" (with James Brown)	2012	—	120	—	—		Django Unchained soundtrack
"—" denotes a recording that did not chart or was not released in that territory.

== Guest appearances ==
List of non-single guest appearances, with other performing artists, showing year released and album name
Title	Year	Other artist(s)	Album
"#1 with a Bullet"	1991	Raw Fusion	Live from the Styleetron
"The DFLO Shuttle"	1991	Digital Underground	Sons of the P
"Salsa Con Soulfood"	1992	Funky Aztecs, Money-B, T.M.D.	Chicano Blues
"Gaffled Like That"	1992	The Governor, Richie Rich	Governor's Taxin'
"Pass the 40"	1992	Raw Fusion, Saafir, Bulldogg, D the Poet 151, Mac Mone, Stretch, Pee-Wee	Hollywood Records Sampler
"Comin' Real Again"	1993	MC Breed	The New Breed
"Definition of a Thug Nigga"	1993	none	Poetic Justice
"Gangsta Team"	1994	South Central Cartel, MC Eiht, Ice-T, Spice 1	'N Gatz We Truss
"Pain"	1994	Stretch	Above the Rim {cassette bonus track}
"Loyal to the Game"	1994	Treach, Riddler	Above the Rim {cassette bonus track}
"Let's Get It On"	1994	Eddie F, The Notorious B.I.G., Heavy D, Grand Puba, Spunk Bigga	Let's Get It On: The Album
"Skank Wit' U"	1994	Don Jagwarr	Faded
"Jealous Got Me Strapped"	1994	Spice 1	AmeriKKKa's Nightmare
"We Do This"	1995	Too Short, MC Breed, Father Dom	Cocktails
"Throw Your Hands Up"	1995	—N/a	Pump Ya Fist: Hip Hop Inspired By the Black Panthers
"P.Y.T. (Playa Young Thugs)"	1995	Smooth	Smooth
"My Block"	1995	—N/a	The Show
"Runnin (From the Police)"	1995	2Pac, Outlawz, Stretch, Notorious B.I.G. & Brownman	One Million Strong
"High 'Til I Die"	1996	—N/a	Sunset Park
"Got 2 Survive"	1996	Young Lay, Ray Luv, Mac Mall	Black 'n Dangerous
"Million Dollar Spot"	1996	E-40, B-Legit	Tha Hall of Game
"Niggaz Done Changed"	1996	Richie Rich	Seasoned Veteran
"Outro"	1996	Snoop Doggy Dogg	Tha Doggfather
"Never Had a Friend Like Me"	1997	none	Gridlock'd (soundtrack)
"Out the Moon (Boom, Boom, Boom)"	1997	Snoop Doggy Dogg, Soopafly, Techniec, Bad Azz, Tray Deee	Gridlock'd (soundtrack)
"Life Is a Traffic Jam"	1997	Eight Mile Road	Gridlock'd (soundtrack)
"Big Bad Lady"	1997	The Lady of Rage, Kevin Vernando	Necessary Roughness
"Troublesome 92"	1997	—N/a	How to Be a Player (soundtrack)
"4 tha Hustlas"	1997	Ant Banks, Too Short, MC Breed, Otis & Shug	Big Thangs
"Life's So Hard"	1997	—N/a	Gang Related (soundtrack)
"Starin' Through My Rear View"	1997	Outlawz	Gang Related (soundtrack)
"Made Niggaz"	1997	Outlawz	Gang Related (soundtrack)
"Lost Souls"	1997	Outlawz	Gang Related (soundtrack)
"Playaz Dedication"	1997	Rappin' 4-Tay	4 tha Hard Way
"Homies & Thuggs" (Remix)	1998	Scarface, Master P, Doracell	My Homies
"Initiated"	1998	Daz Dillinger, Kurupt, Outlawz	Retaliation, Revenge and Get Back
"Me & My Homies"	1998	Nate Dogg, Nanci Fletcher	G-Funk Classics, Vol. 1 & 2
"Real Bad Boys"	1998	DJ King Assassin	3 Beam Circus
"Words to My First Born"	1998	Nutt-So	The Betrayal
"I Can't Turn Back"	1998	Young Akayser, Spice 1	Cellblock Compilation II: Face/Off
"World Don't Take Me Personally"	1998	Young Swoop G, 2 Scoops	World Don't Take Me Personally
"Raise Up Off These Nuts"	1998	Akil, Sylk E Fyne, D'wayne Wiggins, Ashley, JoJo	Heat
"Dayz of a Criminal"	1998	none	Playas Association Vol. 2: Full Time Hustlin'
"Gotta Get Mine" (Remix)	1999	MC Breed	It's All Good
"Gaffled"	1999	3X Krazy, Eklipze, B.N.T.	Immortalized
"Ghetto"	1999	Mike Mosley, Tammi	Platinum Plaques
"Live Freestyle"	1999	Funkmaster Flex, Big Kap, The Notorious B.I.G.	The Tunnel
"You Don't Wanna Battle With Me ('99 Remix)"	1999	51.50	Illegally Insane
"Deadly Combination"	2000	Big L	The Big Picture
"Friends"	2000	none	Too Gangsta for Radio
"Thug Nature"	2000	none	Too Gangsta for Radio
"So Much Pain"	2001	Ja Rule	Pain Is Love
"Untouchable"	2001	Lisa "Left Eye" Lopes	Supernova
"Don't Stop"	2001	Tha Dogg Pound	2002
"The Pledge" (Remix)	2002	Irv Gotti, Ashanti, Nas, Ja Rule	Irv Gotti Presents: The Remixes
"Me and My Boyfriend"	2002	Toni Braxton	More Than a Woman
"Street Soldiers"	2003	The Game, 50 Cent	Live In Compton
"Game Tight"	2003	Krayzie Bone	The Legends Underground Vol. 1
"Change My Ways"	2004	Young Buck	Welcome to the Hood
"U Gotta Take It (One Day at a Time)"	2004	Spice 1, LP, Headstrong	The Ridah
"I C Dead People"	2004	Redman, Big L, Big Pun, The Notorious B.I.G.	Ill At Will Mixtape Vol. 1
"Jawz Tight (OG Cypher)"	2004	Yaki Kadafi, Outlawz, Boot Camp Clik	Son Rize Vol. 1
"Run All Out"	2004	Yaki Kadafi	Son Rize Vol. 1
"Killing Fields"	2004	Yaki Kadafi, Young Thugz	Son Rize Vol. 1
"They Don't Give a Fuck"	2004	Yaki Kadafi, Hussein Fatal	Son Rize Vol. 1
"First 2 Bomb" (Remix)	2004	Yaki Kadafi, Fatalveli	Son Rize Vol. 1
"Get Worried"	2004	Yaki Kadafi	Son Rize Vol. 1
"Secretz Rearranged"	2004	Yaki Kadafi, Hussein Fatal, Kastro	Son Rize Vol. 1
"Where Will I Be?"	2004	Yaki Kadafi, Young Thugz	Son Rize Vol. 1
"Home Late"	2004	Yaki Kadafi	Son Rize Vol. 1
"Who Believes?"	2004	Yaki Kadafi, Fatalveli	Son Rize Vol. 1
"Unborn Letters"	2004	Yaki Kadafi, Rizz, The Kidz	Son Rize Vol. 1
"Part 2"	2004	Jon B., Johnny J	Stronger Everyday
"Trying to Make It Through"	2005	Benzino, Freddie Foxxx	Arch Nemesis
"Momma"	2005	Keyshia Cole, Eminem	Team Invasion Presents Keyshia Cole
"Stay True"	2005	Mopreme Shakur, Stretch	Evolution of a Thug Life N.I.G.G.A. Vol. 1.1
"Shit Don't Stop"	2005	Mopreme Shakur, Big Syke	Evolution of a Thug Life N.I.G.G.A. Vol. 1.1
"Playa Cardz Right"	2005	Mopreme Shakur, Big Syke	Evolution of a Thug Life N.I.G.G.A. Vol. 1.1
"What Goes On"	2005	Mopreme Shakur, Mouse Man	Evolution of a Thug Life N.I.G.G.A. Vol. 1.1
"N.I.G.G.A." (Berocke A.K.A. BME Remix)	2005	Mopreme Shakur, Mouse Man	Evolution of a Thug Life N.I.G.G.A. Vol. 1.1
"What's Next?"	2005	Mopreme Shakur, Big Syke	Evolution of a Thug Life N.I.G.G.A. Vol. 1.2
"My Homeboys (Back to Back)"	2005	Kurupt, Eastwood	Against the Grain
"Bad Boy"	2005	Eko Fresh, Young Noble	Fick Immer Noch Deine Story
"Living in Pain"	2005	The Notorious B.I.G., Mary J. Blige, Nas	Duets: The Final Chapter
"Us Against The World"	2005	Lil Eazy-E, The Notorious B.I.G.	Compton for Life, Vol. 1
"Had to Be a Hustler"	2005	Lil Eazy-E, Eazy-E, Dresta, Lil' ½ Dead	Compton for Life, Vol. 1
"Thugs Up In the Club"	2005	Lil Eazy-E, The Notorious B.I.G.	Compton for Life, Vol. 1
"Rise"	2005	Young Dre the Truth, Lina	Revolution in Progress, The Movement
"Heaven"	2005	Richard Raw, Na' Fear	My City (A Place Where Somebody Can Be Nobody)
"Still Busting"	2006	Muszamil, H-Ryda	Reparation Is Due
"Interlude" / "Political Soldiers"	2006	Muszamil, H-Ryda	Reparation Is Due
"Deadly Combination (Remix)"	2006	Big L, The Notorious B.I.G.	The Archives 1996–2000
"Better Dayz (O.F.T.B. Remix)"	2007	O.F.T.B., Big Syke	The Missing D.R. Files
"World Wide (Time After Time)"	2007	O.F.T.B., Yaki Kadafi, Kurupt	The Missing D.R. Files
"Against All Odds"	2007	Trae	Life Goes On
"Stop the Music"	2007	Layzie Bone, Thin C	Startin' from Scratch: How a Thug Was Born
"Have Heart Have Money"	2007	Mopreme Shakur, Macadoshis, Big Syke, Taje	Black & Brown Pride
"Shock G'z Outro" / "Hidden Track"	2007	Shock G, Ray Luv, DJ King Assassin	Black & Brown Pride
"Ghetto Blues"	2007	Grand Daddy I.U., Early B	Stick to the Script
"We Can't Stop"	2007	Kutt Calhoun	Flamez Mixtape
"Ready 4 Whatever" (Remix)	2007	Big Syke	Reincarnated Volume 1
"I'm Losin' It" (September 7 Remix)	2007	Big Syke, Spice 1	Reincarnated Volume 1
"Money On My Mind"	2007	Big Syke, 50 Cent	Reincarnated Volume 1
"In the Streets"	2008	Roccett	Corporate America
"Killa"	2008	Bumpy Knuckles, Benzino	Crazy Like a Foxxx
"All Eyez on Me (The Truth)"	2008	Young Dre the Truth, BJ the Chicago Kid	NBA Live 10 (soundtrack)
"Did It All B4"	2009	Outlawz, Lloyd	Outlaw Culture, Vol. 2: The Official Mixtape
"One Hood"	2009	Down AKA Kilo, Erik Tucker	Cholo Skate
"My Homeboyz (Back 2 Back) (Remix)	2009	Kurupt, Eastwood, Petey Pablo	Row Ryda
"Right Now"	2010	Bun B, Pimp C, Trey Songz	Trill OG
"American Gangsta"	2010	Nutt-So, Hussein Fatal	Outkasted Outlawz
"Rollin' & Smokin'"	2010	Spice 1, Scarface, Devin the Dude	none
"Can't Turn Back"	2010	Spice 1, Blackjack	none
"Ya Hear Me"	2011	Kanchi	Valvet Chipset
"Army All by Myself"	2011	June Summers, Nipsey Hussle, Jay Rock	Hookman for Hire
"All In"	2011	Knoc-turn'al	
"Unchained (The Payback / Untouchable)"	2012	James Brown	Django Unchained
"All by Myself"	2012	Jah Cure	World Cry
"Hit 'Em Up"	2013	Tyga, Jadakiss	Hotel California
"From the Gutter"	2013	Hussein Fatal, Young Noble, Suicide Ru	The Interview: It's Not a Gimmik 2 Me
"Worldwide (OG Remix)"	2013	8Ball, Pimp C, Lloyd	O.G. Est. 1992
"Out in a Blaze"	2014	The Outlawz, Young Buck	Jerzey Giantz
"Mortal Man"	2015	Kendrick Lamar	To Pimp a Butterfly
"On Me"	2016	Gucci Mane	Non-album single
"Both Worlds"	2017	Krayzie Bone, Young Noble	Thug Brothers 2

== Music videos ==
=== As lead artist ===
List of music videos as lead artist, with directors, showing year released
Title	Year	Director(s)
"Brenda's Got a Baby"	1992	The Hughes Brothers
"If My Homie Calls"	1992	Allen Hughes
"Trapped"	1992	Allen Hughes
"Holler if Ya Hear Me"	1993	Stephen Ashley Blake
"I Get Around" (featuring Digital Underground)	1993	David Dobkin
"Keep Ya Head Up" (featuring Dave Hollister)	1993	David Dobkin
"Papa'z Song" (featuring Wycked)	1994	James Micheal Marshall
"Pour Out a Little Liquor"	1994	2Pac
"Cradle to the Grave"	1994	Ricky Harris
"How Long Will They Mourn Me?" (featuring Nate Dogg)	1994	—
"Dear Mama"	1995	Lionel C. Martin
"So Many Tears"	1995	Lionel C. Martin
"Temptations"	1995	David Nelson
"California Love" (featuring Dr. Dre and Roger Troutman)	1996	J. Kevin Swain
"California Love" (Remix) (featuring Dr. Dre and Roger Troutman)	1996	—
"All About U" (featuring Dru Down, Hussein Fatal, Yaki Kadafi, Nate Dogg and Snoop Doggy Dogg)	1996	Marlene Rhein, Rob Johnson
"2 of Amerikaz Most Wanted" (featuring Snoop Doggy Dogg)	1996	Tupac Shakur, Gobi Nejad
"How Do U Want It" (featuring K-Ci & JoJo)	1996	Ron Hightower
"How Do U Want It" (Alt. Ver.) (featuring K-Ci & JoJo)	1996	J. Kevin Swain
"Hit 'Em Up" (featuring Outlawz)	1996	J. Kevin Swain
"Made Niggaz" (with Outlawz)	1996	Gobi Nejad, Tupac Shakur
"I Ain't Mad at Cha" (featuring Danny Boy)	1996	Tupac Shakur, J. Kevin Swain
"Toss It Up"	1996	Lionel C. Martin
"Toss It Up" (Alt. Ver.)	1996	Lionel C. Martin
"To Live & Die in L.A." (featuring Val Young)	1997	J. Kevin Swain
"Hail Mary"	1997	Frank Sacramento
"Wanted Dead or Alive" (with Snoop Doggy Dogg)	1997	Scott Kalvert
"I Wonder If Heaven Got a Ghetto"	1997	Lionel C. Martin
"Do for Love" (featuring Eric Williams)	1998	Bill Parker
"Changes"	1998	Chris Hafner
"Unconditional Love"	1999	Rob Johnson
"Baby Don't Cry (Keep Ya Head Up II)" (with Outlawz)	2000	J. Jesses Smith
"Until the End of Time" (featuring R.L.)	2001	Chris Hafner
"Letter 2 My Unborn"	2001	Chris Hafner
"Thugz Mansion" (featuring Nas and J. Phoenix)	2002	David Nelson
"Runnin' (Dying to Live)" (featuring The Notorious B.I.G.)	2003	Philip G. Atwell
"Ghetto Gospel" (featuring Elton John)	2005	Nzingha Stewart
"Pac's Life" (featuring T.I. and Ashanti)	2006	Gobi Nejad
"Unchained (The Payback/Untouchable)" (with James Brown)	2013	—

=== As featured artist ===
List of music videos as featured artist, with directors, showing year released
Title	Year	Director(s)
"Same Song" (Digital Underground featuring 2Pac)	1990	Scott Kalvert
"Call It What U Want" (Above the Law featuring 2Pac & Money-B)	1992	Marty Thomas
"Gotta Get Mine" (MC Breed featuring 2Pac)	1993	Unknown
"Wussup wit the Love" (Digital Underground featuring 2Pac)	1993	Unknown
"Smile" (Scarface featuring 2Pac & Johnny P)	1997	Paul Hunter
"Are U Still Down" (Jon B. featuring 2Pac)	1998	Tim Story
"Homies and Thuggs" (Scarface featuring 2Pac and Master P)	1998	-
"The Pledge" (Remix) (Irv Gotti featuring 2Pac, Ashanti, Nas & Ja Rule)	2002	Irv Gotti
"Playa Cardz Right" (Keyshia Cole featuring 2Pac)	2008	Benny Boom

Also, 2pac did brief cameo appearances in: "Whatta Man" by Salt 'N Pepa (1993), "Natural Born Killaz" by Dr. Dre & Ice Cube (1994), and "Rapper's Ball" by E-40 (1996).

== See also ==
- Outlawz discography
- Thug Life
