= 2Pac Live =

Live album by 2Pac
- Released: August 6, 2004
- Genre: West Coast hip hop; conscious hip hop
- Length: 43:41
- Label: Death Row; Koch

2Pac chronology
Nu-Mixx Klazzics (2003)	2Pac Live (2004)	Loyal to the Game (2004)

Professional ratings
Review scores
Source	Rating
AllMusic	2/5 stars
HipHopDX	3.5/5
RapReviews	7.5/10 stars

2Pac Live is a live album by American rapper 2Pac, released by Death Row Records and Koch Records with Suge Knight serving as executive producer. It consisted of recordings of live club performances during the All Eyez on Me (1996) period in his career. Originally planned for an August 10, 2004 release, the album's release date was moved to August 6 due to a leaked bootleg version. 2Pac Live peaked at number 54 on the Billboard 200 chart, with 23,000 copies sold in the first week.

== Track listing ==
No.	Title	Writer(s)	Length
1.	"Live Medley: California Love/So Many Tears"	E. Baker / R.W. Hudson / Roger / Tupac Shakur / Larry Troutman / Stevie Wonder	3:03
2.	"Intro"		0:13
3.	"Ambitionz Az a Ridah"	Delmar "Daz" Arnaud / Tupac Shakur	2:49
4.	"So Many Tears"	2Pac / E. Baker / Greg Jacobs / Stevie Wonder	1:27
5.	"Troublesome"	Johnny Jackson / Tupac Shakur	3:04
6.	"Hit 'Em Up" (featuring Outlawz)	J.J. Jackson / Tupac Shakur / Bruce Washington	4:16
7.	"Tattoo Tears" (original)	Roy Ayers / R. Brown / Kenn Cox / Tupac Shakur	2:39
8.	"Heartz of Men" (2Pac)	D. Blake / George Clinton / W.O. Collins / C. Haskins / Prince / Tupac Shakur	0:06
9.	"All Bout U"	Larry Blackmon / N. Hale / J.J. Jackson / Tupac Shakur / Bruce Washington	3:42
10.	"Never Call You ***** Again" (original)	Tupac Shakur	2:25
11.	"How Do U Want It"	Bruce Fisher / J.J. Jackson / Quincy Jones / Tupac Shakur / Leon Ware	8:01
12.	"2 of Amerikaz Most Wanted"	Delmar "Daz" Arnaud / Calvin Broadus / Tupac Shakur	6:06
13.	"California Love"	Joe Cocker / R.W. Hudson / Roger / Larry Troutman	5:34

== Chart history ==
Chart (2004)	Peak position
German Albums (Offizielle Top 100)	86
French Albums (SNEP)	84
Irish Albums (IRMA)	52
US Billboard 200	54
US Top R&B/Hip-Hop Albums (Billboard)	16
US Independent Albums (Billboard)	3
UK Albums (OCC)	67
