= The Prophet Returns =

Compilation album by 2Pac
- Released: October 3, 2005
- Recorded: 1992–1996
- Genres: West Coast hip hop, gangsta rap
- Length: 1:14:36
- Labels: Death Row, Koch

2Pac chronology
Live at the House of Blues (2005)	The Prophet Returns (2005)	Pac's Life (2006)

The Prophet Returns is a compilation album by American rapper Tupac Shakur, released on October 3, 2005 by Death Row Records and Koch Records. The album consists largely of tracks originally included on Shakur's 1996 album All Eyez on Me.

== Track listing ==
No.	Title	Source album	Length
1.	"Thug Passion" (featuring Jewell, The Outlawz and Storm)	All Eyez on Me	5:09
2.	"Can't C Me" (featuring George Clinton)	All Eyez on Me	5:31
3.	"Holla At Me"	All Eyez on Me	4:56
4.	"Hit 'Em Up" (featuring The Outlawz)	B-side to "How Do You Want It" single	5:12
5.	"Ambitionz az a Ridah"	All Eyez on Me	4:40
6.	"No More Pain"	All Eyez on Me	6:16
7.	"Picture Me Rollin'" (featuring Big Syke, CPO and Danny Boy)	All Eyez on Me	5:16
8.	"Hold Ya Head" (featuring Tyrone Wrice)	The Don Killuminati: The 7 Day Theory	4:00
9.	"I Ain't Mad At Cha" (featuring Danny Boy)	All Eyez on Me	4:53
10.	"Hail Mary" (featuring Kastro, Young Noble, Yaki Kadafi and Prince Ital Joe)	The Don Killuminati: The 7 Day Theory	5:11
11.	"Made Niggaz" (featuring The Outlawz)	Gang Related	5:05
12.	"Keep Ya Head Up"	Strictly 4 My N.I.G.G.A.Z.	4:24
13.	"How Do You Want It" (featuring K-Ci & JoJo)	All Eyez on Me	4:48
14.	"Me Against The World" (featuring Dramacydal)	Me Against The World	4:39
15.	"All Bout U" (featuring Dru Down, Hussein Fatal, Yaki Kadafi, Nate Dogg and Snoop Dogg)	All Eyez on Me	4:36
