= Death Row Greatest Hits =

Greatest hits album by various artists
- Released: November 26, 1996
- Recorded: 1991–1996
- Studio: Dre's Crib (Los Angeles, CA); Encore Studios (Burbank, CA); Soundcastle (Los Angeles, CA); Pure Studios (San Diego, CA); G-Spot Studios (El Monte, CA)
- Genre: West Coast hip hop; gangsta rap; g-funk; R&B
- Length: 2:28:01
- Label: Death Row; Interscope; Priority
- Producer: Suge Knight (exec.); Dr. Dre; Dat Nigga Daz; Kevyn "Cavi" Lewis; 2Pac; Damon Thomas; DJ Daryl; DJ Jam; DJ Quik; J-Flexx; Johnny "J"; Julio G.; Kurt "Kobane" Couthon; Reggie Lamb; Sean "Barney" Thomas; Sir Jinx; Soulshock and Karlin; Tommy D; Tony G; Tony Pizarro

Various artists chronology
Murder Was the Case (1994)	Death Row Greatest Hits (1996)	Christmas on Death Row (1996)

Singles from Death Row Greatest Hits
- 1. "Who Been There, Who Done That" Released: 1996

Professional ratings
Review scores
Source	Rating
AllMusic	4/5 stars

Death Row Greatest Hits is the first greatest hits album and second double album released by Death Row Records and Interscope Records and distributed by Priority Records. Issued on November 26, 1996, the 33-track compilation features a mix of hits, previously unreleased tracks and remixes by both former and then-current Death Row artists. The album peaked at number 35 on the Billboard 200 and was certified Platinum by the Recording Industry Association of America (RIAA) on August 12, 1999.

== Background ==
=== 2Pac's inclusion ===
To avoid cannibalizing sales of other major 1996 Death Row releases, no songs from 2Pac's All Eyez on Me, The Don Killuminati: The 7 Day Theory, or Snoop Dogg's Tha Doggfather were included on the compilation. Of the seven tracks on the album featuring 2Pac, only two—"Hit 'Em Up" and "Smile for Me Now"—were recorded during his tenure with Death Row, and neither appeared on his studio albums.

Four of the remaining five tracks were previously released under Interscope Records before 2Pac joined Death Row. The final track, "Pour Out a Little Liquor", was recorded prior to his signing but had originally appeared on the 1994 Death Row soundtrack Above the Rim. These non-Death Row tracks were able to be included because Interscope was the parent company and distributor of Death Row Records at the time.

In 2003, tracks from the previously omitted 1996 albums were included on the follow-up compilation, Death Row Greatest Hits, Volume 2.

=== Rare and exclusive music ===
- "Dear Mama"—included on disc one of the compilation—is an entirely different mix from the version featured on Me Against the World, despite not being listed as a remix.

Disc two of the compilation primarily features remixes and previously unreleased tracks. Notable inclusions are:

- "Let Me Ride (RMX)" – A remix produced by and featuring a verse from Daz Dillinger, absent from the original version.
- "Daydreaming" – A new song by Michel'le, covering Aretha Franklin's 1972 hit "Day Dreaming".
- "I Get Around (RMX)" – A remix featuring a laid-back jazz instrumental and an additional verse from 2Pac.
- "Hit 'Em Up" – 2Pac's notorious diss track, previously only available on the B-side of the single "How Do U Want It".
- "Who Been There, Who Done That?" – A new parody track by J-Flexx, satirizing Dr. Dre's "Been There, Done That".
- "Me in Your World" – A new track by Tha Dogg Pound. A live version was later released on the live album Tupac: Live at the House of Blues.
- "Smile For Me Now" – A collaboration between 2Pac and Scarface, later remixed and re-released as the single "Smile".

=== Diss tracks aimed at Dr. Dre ===
Continuing the tone of animosity heard on Makaveli’s The 7 Day Theory, Death Row Greatest Hits features a diss track aimed at former label co-founder Dr. Dre on each disc.

- "No Vaseline" by Ice Cube – A 1991 diss track targeting Dr. Dre and other members of N.W.A. While the song had no direct connection to Death Row Records, its inclusion was made possible through distribution ties: Priority Records (the song’s original distributor) and Interscope Records (the compilation’s distributor) were both under the Universal Music Group umbrella.
- "Who Been There, Who Done That?" by J-Flexx – An exclusive diss parodying Dre's post-Death Row single "Been There, Done That", which J-Flexx also ghostwrote. The track accuses Dre of stealing songwriting and production credits while taking all the royalties. It was released as a single with an accompanying music video.

It has been widely speculated that Suge Knight, Death Row Records’ CEO and executive producer of the album, was responsible for fueling the dissension toward Dr. Dre featured throughout the compilation.

=== Artwork ===
The album's cover and disc-tray artwork were created by California-based artist Ronald "Riskie" Brent, a frequent Death Row collaborator. Brent also designed the covers and inserts for several key Death Row releases, including All Eyez on Me, The Don Killuminati: The 7 Day Theory, Tha Doggfather, Christmas on Death Row, and Retaliation, Revenge and Get Back.

== Track listing ==
Disc one of two
No.	Title	Writer(s)	Producer(s)	Length
1.	"Nuthin' but a G Thang"	Calvin Broadus; Leon Haywood; Frederick Knight	Dr. Dre	3:41
2.	"Gin & Juice"	Broadus; Andre Young; Harry Wayne Casey; Richard Finch; Danny Webster; Mark Adams; Raye Turner; Stephen C. Washington; Steve Arrington	Dr. Dre	3:31
3.	"Afro Puffs"	Robin Allen; Delmar Arnaud; John Watson	Dr. Dre; Dat Nigga Daz	4:45
4.	"Natural Born Killaz"	Young; O'Shea Jackson	Dr. Dre; Sam Sneed (co.)	4:46
5.	"Who Am I (What's My Name?)"	Broadus; David Spradley; Garry Shider; George Clinton, Jr.	Dr. Dre	4:07
6.	"Keep Their Heads Ringin'"	Young; Samuel Anderson; James Anderson; Angela Brown; Cheryl Cook; Gwendolyn Chisolm; Sylvia Robinson	Dr. Dre; Sam Sneed (co.)	3:58
7.	"No Vaseline"	Jackson; Anthony Wheaton; Eddie Irons; Ray Ransom; Regi Hargis Hickman	Sir Jinx	4:04
8.	"Doggy Dogg World"	Broadus; Arnaud; Ricardo Brown; Richard Fields	Dr. Dre	4:40
9.	"Keep Ya Head Up"	Tupac Shakur; Daryl Anderson; Roger Troutman; Stan Vincent	DJ Daryl	4:22
10.	"Murder Was the Case"	Broadus; Arnaud; Young	Dr. Dre	4:19
11.	"Lil' Ghetto Boy"	Broadus; Tracy Lynn Curry; Edward Howard	Dr. Dre	4:20
12.	"Ain't No Fun"	Broadus; Brown; Nathaniel Hale; Warren Griffin III; Young	Dr. Dre	4:09
13.	"Lodi Dodi"	Broadus; Ricky Walters; Douglas Davis; Rokusuke Ei; Hachidai Nakamura	Dr. Dre	4:24
14.	"Stranded on Death Row"	Young; Broadus; Eric Collins; Allen; Brown; Allen Williams; William Nichols; Isaac Hayes	Dr. Dre	4:40
15.	"The Shiznit"	Broadus; Young	Dr. Dre	4:15
16.	"Dear Mama"	Shakur; Joe Sample; Bruce Hawes; Charles Simmons; Joseph Jefferson	Tony Pizarro; DF Master Tee (co.); Moses (co.)	4:55
17.	"Me Against the World"	Shakur; Carsten Schack; Kenneth Karlin; Burt Bacharach; Hal David; Leon Ware; Minnie Riperton; Richard Rudolph	Soulshock and Karlin	4:39

Disc two of two
No.	Title	Writer(s)	Producer(s)	Length
18.	"Let Me Ride (Rmx)"	Calvin Broadus; Eric Collins; Bernie Worrell; William Collins; George Clinton, Jr.	Dat Nigga Daz	6:01
19.	"Gin & Juice (Rmx)"	Broadus; Andre Young	Dat Nigga Daz	5:02
20.	"Daydreaming"	Aretha Franklin	Kevyn "Cavi" Lewis; Kurt "Kobane" Couthon; Reggie Lamb	4:53
21.	"Who Am I (What's My Name?) (Rmx)"	Broadus; David Spradley; Garry Shider; Clinton, Jr.	Dat Nigga Daz	4:09
22.	"Nuthin' But a G Thang (Rmx)"	Broadus; Leon Haywood	DJ Jam; Tommy D	4:33
23.	"I Get Around (Rmx)"	Tupac Shakur; Ronald Brooks; Gregory Jacobs; Larry Troutman; Roger Troutman; Shirley Murdock	Kevyn "Cavi" Lewis	4:00
24.	"Lil' Ghetto Boy (Rmx)"	Broadus; Tracy Lynn Curry; Edward Howard	Tony G.; Julio G	4:52
25.	"Hit 'Em Up"	Shakur; Dennis Lambert; Duane Hitchings; Franne Golde		5:10
26.	"Who Been There, Who Done That?"	James Anderson; Sean Thomas; Patrice Rushen; Freddie Washington; Terri McFadden	J-Flexx; Sean "Barney" Thomas	4:29
27.	"Fuck wit Dre Day (Rmx)"	Jewell Caples; Young; Broadus; Spradley; Shider; Clinton, Jr.	Kevyn "Cavi" Lewis	4:36
28.	"Pour Out a Little Liquor"	Shakur; Leon Huff; Kenneth Gamble	Johnny "J"	3:28
29.	"What Would You Do"	Delmar Arnaud; Ricardo Brown; Broadus; Caples; Delemond Williams	Dat Nigga Daz	5:08
30.	"Come Up to My Room"	Cedric Hailey; Dalvin DeGrate; Donald DeGrate; Arnaud	Dat Nigga Daz; DeVante Swing (co.)	4:36
31.	"Come When I Call"	Daniel Steward; David Blake; Ray Parker Jr.; Michael Henderson	DJ Quik	4:55
32.	"Me in Your World"	Arnaud; Brown	Dat Nigga Daz	3:47
33.	"Smile for Me Now"	Shakur; Brad Jordan; Damon Thomas	Damon Thomas; 2Pac	4:47
Total length:				2:28:01

Sample credits

- Track 1 contains samples from "I Want'a Do Something Freaky to You" as recorded by Leon Haywood and interpolations from "Uphill Peace of Mind" written by Frederick Knight
- Track 2 contains samples from "I Get Lifted" as recorded by George McCrae and interpolations from "Watching You" written by Slave
- Track 3 contains samples from "Love That Will Not Die" as recorded by Johnny "Guitar" Watson
- Track 5 contains interpolations from "Atomic Dog" written by George Clinton, Garry Shider & David Spradley
- Track 6 contains interpolations from "Funk You Up" written by The Sequence and Sylvia Robinson
- Track 7 contains samples from "Dazz" as recorded by Brick
- Track 8 contains interpolations from "If It Ain't One Thing, It's Another" written by Richard "Dimples" Fields
- Track 9 contains samples from "Be Alright" as recorded by Roger Troutman and interpolations from "O-o-h Child" written by Stan Vincent
- Track 11 contains samples from "Little Getto Boy" as recorded by Donny Hathaway
- Track 13 contains interpolations from "La Di Da Di" written by Slick Rick & Doug E. Fresh and "Sukiyaki" written by Rokusuke Ei & Hachidai Nakamura
- Track 14 contains samples from "If It Don't Turn You On" as recorded by B. T. Express and "Do Your Thang" as recorded by Isaac Hayes
- Track 16 contains samples from "In My Wildest Dreams" as recorded by Joe Sample and interpolations from "Sadie" written by Joseph B. Jefferson, Bruce Hawes & Charles Simmons
- Track 17 contains samples from "Inside My Love" as recorded by Minnie Riperton and "Walk on By" as recorded by Isaac Hayes
- Track 23 contains samples from "Computer Love" as recorded by Zapp
- Track 25 contains interpolations from "Don't Look Any Further" written by Franne Golde, Dennis Lambert & Duane Hitchings
- Track 26 contains samples from "Forget Me Nots" as recorded by Patrice Rushen
- Track 28 contains samples from "Cry Together" as recorded by The O'Jays
- Track 31 contains samples from "Let Me Love You" as recorded by Ray Parker Jr.

== Personnel ==
Vocalists

- Andre "Dr. Dre" Young – performer (tracks: 1, 4, 6, 11, 14, 18, 22, 24)
- Calvin "Snoop Dogg" Broadus – performer (tracks: 1, 2, 5, 8, 10, 12–15, 19, 21, 29)
- Robin "The Lady of Rage" Allen – performer (tracks: 3, 14)
- O'Shea "Ice Cube" Jackson – performer (tracks: 4, 7)
- Barbara Wilson – performer (track 6)
- Dorothy Coleman – performer (track 6)
- Nancy Fletcher – performer (tracks: 6, 13)
- Delmar "Daz Dillinger" Arnaud – performer (tracks: 8, 10, 19, 21, 29, 30, 32)
- Ricardo "Kurupt" Brown – performer (tracks: 8, 12, 14, 29, 30)
- The Dramatics – performers (track 8)
- Tupac Shakur – performer (tracks: 9, 16, 17, 23, 25, 28, 33)
- Dave "The Black Angel" Hollister – performer (track 9)
- Nathaniel "Nate Dogg" Hale – performer (track 12)
- Warren Griffin – performer (track 12)
- Eric "RBX" Collins – performer (track 14)
- Outlawz – performers (tracks: 17, 25)
- Puff Johnson – performer (track 17)
- Jewell Caples – performer (tracks: 18, 27, 29)
- Michel'le – performer (track 20)
- Digital Underground – performers (track 23)
- O.G.Enius – performer (track 24)
- James "J-Flexx" Anderson – performer (track 26)
- Sean "Barney Rubble" Thomas – performer (track 26)
- Jodeci – performers (track 30)
- "Danny Boy" Stewart – performer (track 31)
- Brad "Scarface" Jordan – performer (track 33)
- 816 – performer (track 33)

Instrumentalists

- Priest "Soopafly" Brooks – keyboards (tracks: 4, 18, 19, 21, 29, 30)
- Stewart "Stu-B-Doo" Bullard – keyboards (track 6)
- James "Timbali" Cornwell – percussion (tracks: 18, 23)
- Fernando Harkless – horns (tracks: 18, 20, 27), flute (track 20)
- Rahmlee Davis – horns (tracks: 18, 20, 27)
- Steve Baxter – horns (tracks: 18, 20, 27)
- Tyrone Griffin – horns (tracks: 18, 20, 27)
- Cornelius "Corny" Mims – bass (tracks: 20, 23, 27)
- Kevyn "Cavi" Lewis – keyboards (tracks: 20, 23, 27)
- Warryn Campbell – keyboards (track 20)
- Ricardo Rouse – guitar (tracks: 22, 23, 27)
- Derek Organ – drums (tracks: 23, 27)
- Darrel Crooks – guitar (trackS; 23, 27)
- Cassandra O'Neal – keyboards (tracks: 23, 27)
- Sean "Barney" Thomas – keyboards & programming (track 26)

Producers

- Dr. Dre – producer (tracks: 1–6, 8, 10–15)
- Daz Dillinger – producer (tracks: 3, 18, 19, 21, 29, 30, 32)
- Anthony "Sir Jinx" Wheaton – producer (track 7)
- "D.J. Daryl" Anderson – producer (track 9)
- Tony Pizarro – producer (track 16)
- Carsten "Soulshock" Schack – producer (track 17)
- Kenneth Karlin – producer (track 17)
- Kevyn Lewis – producer (track: 20, 23, 27), horns producer (track 18)
- Kurt "Kobane" Couthon – producer (track 20)
- Reggie Lamb – producer (track 20)
- DJ Jam – producer (track 22)
- Tommy D. Daugherty – producer (track 22)
- Antonio "Tony G" Gonzalez – producer (track 24)
- Julio Gonzalez – producer (track 24)
- Barney Rubble – producer (track 26)
- J-Flexx – producer (track 26)
- Johnny "J" Lee Jackson – producer (track 28)
- David "DJ Quik" Blake – producer (track 31)
- Damon Thomas – producer (track 33)
- 2Pac – producer (track 33)
- Samuel "Sam Sneed" Anderson – co-producer (tracks: 4, 6)
- Terrence "DF Master Tee" Thomas – co-producer (track 16)
- Moses – co-producer (track 16)
- Donald "DeVante Swing" DeGrate – co-producer (track 30)
- Marion Hugh "Suge" Knight Jr. – executive producer

Technical

- Dr. Dre – mixing (tracks: 3, 29)
- Keston Wright – engineering (track 6)
- Tommy D – engineering (track 6)
- Tony Pizarro – engineering (track 16)
- Paul Arnold – mix engineering (track 16)
- Jay Lean – mix engineering (track 17)
- Soulshock – mix engineering (track 17)
- Dave Aron – mixing (tracks: 19, 33), engineering (track 33)
- Reggie Lamb – vocal arranger (track 20)
- Lance Pierre – engineering (track 22)
- Patrick Shevelin – engineering (track 22)
- Norman Anthony Whitfield Jr. – mixing (track 28)
- Dalvin "Mr. Dalvin" DeGrate – vocal arranger (track 30)
- Brian "Big Bass" Gardner – mastering

Additional

- George Pryce – art direction
- Kim Holt – design
- Ronald "Riskie" Brent – front cover illustration
- T.J. Johnson – inlay illustration
- Edge Films – photography
- Ken Nahoum – photography
- Suge Knight – liner notes
- Roy Tesfay – project coordination
- Norris Anderson – project supervision

== Charts ==
=== Weekly charts ===
Chart (1996)	Peak position
US Billboard 200	35
US Top R&B/Hip-Hop Albums (Billboard)	15

=== Year-end charts ===
Chart (1997)	Position
US Billboard 200	116
US Top R&B/Hip-Hop Albums (Billboard)	65

== Certifications ==
Region	Certification	Certified units/sales
United States (RIAA)	Platinum	1,000,000^{^}
^{^} Shipments figures based on certification alone.
