= The Prophet: The Best of the Works =

Greatest hits album by Tupac Shakur
- Released: July 7, 2003
- Recorded: 1994–1996
- Genre: Rap
- Length: 67:45
- Label: Death Row

Tupac Shakur chronology
Better Dayz (2002)	The Prophet: The Best of the Works (2003)	Nu-Mixx Klazzics (2003)

The Prophet: The Best of the Works is a bootleg compilation album by American rapper 2Pac, released in 2003 by Death Row Records. The album includes several songs from All Eyez on Me, The Don Killuminati: The 7 Day Theory and Thug Life: Volume 1.

== Track listing ==
No.	Title	Featured Artist(s)	Length
1.	"Only God Can Judge Me"	Rappin' 4-Tay	4:56
2.	"Just Like Daddy"	Outlawz	5:08
3.	"Me and My Girlfriend"		5:10
4.	"Against All Odds"		4:24
5.	"Tradin War Stories"	Outlawz, C-Bo, CPO & Storm	5:27
6.	"Skandalouz"	Nate Dogg	4:09
7.	"2 of Amerikaz Most Wanted"	Snoop Doggy Dogg	4:06
8.	"To Live & Die in LA"	Val Young	4:35
9.	"California Love"	Dr. Dre, Roger Troutman	6:25
10.	"Pour Out a Little Liquor"		3:31
11.	"Life of an Outlaw"	Outlawz	4:56
12.	"All Eyez On Me"	Big Syke	5:09
13.	"Wanted Dead Or Alive"	Snoop Doggy Dogg	4:37
14.	"Staring Through My Rear View"	Outlawz	5:12

- Only God Can Judge Me, Tradin' War Stories, Skandalouz, 2 of Amerikaz Most Wanted, California Love & All Eyez On Me, all originally appeared in All Eyez On Me.
- Just Like Daddy, Me & My Girlfriend, Against All Odds, To Live & Die in L.A. & Life Of An Outlaw, all originally appeared in The Don Killuminati: The 7 Day Theory.
- Pour Out A Little Liquor, originally appeared on the Above The Rim soundtrack.
- Wanted Dead Or Alive, originally appeared on the Gridlock'd soundtrack.
- Staring Through My Rear View, original appeared on the Gang Related soundtrack.

== Charts ==
Chart	Peak position
Irish Albums Chart	41
New Zealand Albums Chart	40

== Certifications ==
Certifications for The Prophet: The Best of the Works
Region	Certification	Certified units/sales
New Zealand (RMNZ)	Platinum	15,000^{‡}
^{‡} Sales+streaming figures based on certification alone.
