= Nu-Mixx Klazzics =

Remix album by 2Pac
- Released: October 7, 2003
- Recorded: 1995–1996
- Genre: West Coast hip hop; political hip hop; gangsta rap
- Length: 54:27
- Label: Death Row; Koch

2Pac chronology
The Prophet: The Best of the Works (2003)	Nu-Mixx Klazzics (2003)	Tupac: Resurrection (2003)

Professional ratings
Review scores
Source	Rating
AllMusic	link
RapReviews.com	link

Nu-Mixx Klazzics is a remix album by American rapper 2Pac, released in 2003 under Death Row Records and Koch Records. The album includes several songs from All Eyez on Me and The Don Killuminati: The 7 Day Theory, with remixed instrumentals and new guest vocals from artists such as Crooked I (replacing Snoop Dogg on the "2 of Amerikaz Most Wanted" remix), Aaron Hall, K-Ci & JoJo, and Danny Boy. Nu-Mixx Klazzics was generally disliked by critics upon its release. The remixes were criticized for being another Death Row 'cash in' featuring low quality versions of the original tracks.

== Track listing ==
Nu-Mixx Klazzics track listing
No.	Title	Length
1.	"2 of Amerikaz Most Wanted" (featuring Crooked I)	3:53
2.	"How Do You Want It" (featuring K-Ci & JoJo)	5:02
3.	"Hail Mary" (featuring Outlawz)	5:20
4.	"Life Goes On"	4:58
5.	"All Eyez on Me" (featuring Big Syke)	4:51
6.	"Heartz of Men"	4:38
7.	"Toss It Up" (featuring Danny Boy, K-Ci & JoJo & Aaron Hall)	4:49
8.	"Hit 'Em Up" (featuring Outlawz)	4:16
9.	"Never Had a Friend Like Me"	4:06
10.	"Ambitionz az a Ridah"	4:21
Total length:		54:27

- Note: All songs remixed otherwise stated.

== Personnel ==
- Tupac Shakur – main performer
- Suge Knight – executive producer
- Carl "Butch" Small – percussion, production director
- Danny "O.M.B." Devoux – bass, guitar
- Ken Nahoum – photography
- Tom Daugherty – engineer, mixing engineer, mixing
- Mike Bozzi – mastering
- Tracy Hardin – vocals, vocals (background)
- Matt "Party Man" Woodlief – assistant engineer
- Darren Vegas – drums, sequencing, keyboards
- Tha Row Hitters – producer, mixing
- Josh "Kash" Andrews – drums, keyboards, sequencing
- Soren Baker – liner notes
- Michael Blade – flute
- Brian Gardner – mastering

== Charts ==
Chart performance for Nu-Mixx Klazzics
Chart (2003)	Peak position
Australian Albums (ARIA)	85
US Billboard 200	15
US Independent Albums (Billboard)	2
US Top R&B/Hip-Hop Albums (Billboard)	5
