= Live at the House of Blues (Tupac Shakur album) =

2005 live album by 2Pac

Tupac: Live at the House of Blues

Live album by 2Pac
- Released: September 5, 2005
- Recorded: July 4, 1996
- Venue: House of Blues (Sunset Strip, West Hollywood)
- Genre: West Coast hip hop; gangsta rap; g-funk
- Length: 1:58:00
- Label: Death Row; Eagle Vision

2Pac chronology
Loyal to the Game (2004)	Tupac: Live at the House of Blues (2005)	The Prophet Returns (2005)

Professional ratings
Review scores
Source	Rating
Allmusic	2/5 stars
RapReviews.com	7/10 stars

Tupac: Live at the House of Blues is a live album capturing the final concert by American rapper 2Pac. The performance was recorded at the House of Blues on the Sunset Strip in West Hollywood, California, on July 4, 1996. It was released posthumously on both CD and DVD on September 5, 2005, through Death Row Records.

== Background ==
Although the album is credited solely to 2Pac, the concert was in fact a joint show with Snoop Dogg and Tha Dogg Pound. Throughout the first half of the performance, 2Pac—backed by his hip-hop clique, the Outlawz—takes the stage and is joined by R&B duo K-Ci & JoJo. In the second half, Snoop Dogg performs alongside Tha Dogg Pound and features West Coast singer Nate Dogg. For the show’s climax, 2Pac returns to the stage to perform his then-recent hit, "2 of Amerikaz Most Wanted", alongside Snoop Dogg.

Of the songs performed by 2Pac, three were unreleased at the time and would not see an official release until years after his death: "Troublesome", "Tattoo Tears", and "Never Call U Bitch Again". Tha Dogg Pound also performed an unreleased track, "Me in Your World", which would later appear on Death Row Greatest Hits that same year.

Since its release, Tupac: Live at the House of Blues has sold over a million copies and is certified Platinum.

The DVD and Blu-ray editions feature the full uncut concert and include five full-length music videos: "California Love (Remix)", "To Live & Die in L.A.", "Hit 'Em Up", "How Do You Want It", and "I Ain't Mad at Cha".

== Track listing ==
No.	Title	Length
1.	"Ambitionz az a Ridah" (featuring Outlawz)	2:13
2.	"So Many Tears" (featuring Outlawz)	1:54
3.	"Troublesome" (featuring Outlawz)	2:40
4.	"Hit 'Em Up" (featuring Outlawz)	4:25
5.	"Tattoo Tears" (featuring Outlawz)	2:23
6.	"All Bout U" (featuring Outlawz)	2:59
7.	"Never Call U B***h Again" (featuring Outlawz)	2:26
8.	"Freek'n You" (featuring K-Ci & JoJo, Outlawz)	1:03
9.	"How Do U Want It" (featuring K-Ci & JoJo, Outlawz)	4:42
10.	"What Would U Do" (featuring Tha Dogg Pound)	4:20
11.	"Murder Was the Case" (featuring Tha Dogg Pound)	3:45
12.	"Tha Shiznit" (featuring Tha Dogg Pound)	2:29
13.	"If We All Gone Fuck" (featuring Tha Dogg Pound)	2:31
14.	"Some Bomb Azz (Pussy)" (featuring Nate Dogg Tha Dogg Pound)	3:05
15.	"Ain't No Fun (If the Homies Can't Have None)" (featuring Nate Dogg, Tha Dogg Pound)	3:20
16.	"New York, New York" (featuring Tha Dogg Pound)	4:44
17.	"Big Pimpin'" (featuring Nate Dogg, Tha Dogg Pound)	2:30
18.	"Do What I Feel" (featuring Tha Dogg Pound)	3:58
19.	"G'z and Hustlas" (featuring Tha Dogg Pound)	2:43
20.	"Who Am I? (What's My Name?)" (featuring Tha Dogg Pound)	2:57
21.	"Me in Your World" (featuring Tha Dogg Pound)	3:12
22.	"For My Niggaz and Bitches" (featuring Tha Dogg Pound)	2:23
23.	"Doggfather" (featuring Tha Dogg Pound)	2:50
24.	"Gin and Juice" (featuring Tha Dogg Pound)	6:00
25.	"2 of Amerikaz Most Wanted" (featuring Nate Dogg, Snoop Dogg, K-Ci & JoJo, Outlawz, Tha Dogg Pound)	4:04

== Charts ==
Album

Chart positions	Peak position
French Charts	179
U.S. Billboard 200	159
U.S. Billboard Top R&B/Hip Hop Albums	48
U.S. Billboard Top Independent Albums	11

== Certifications ==
Region	Certification	Certified units/sales
Australia (ARIA)	Gold	7,500^{^}
New Zealand (RMNZ)	Gold	2,500^{^}
United Kingdom (BPI)	Gold	25,000^{^}
United States (RIAA)	Platinum	100,000^{^}
^{^} Shipments figures based on certification alone.
