= Angel Kelly =

American actress (born 1962)

- Born: December 7, 1962 (age 63); Lansing, Michigan, U.S.
- Other name: Sugar Brown
- Occupation: Pornographic actress
- Height: 5 ft 7 in (1.70 m)

Angel Kelly (born December 7, 1962) is a retired pornographic actress. With Jeannie Pepper and Heather Hunter, Kelly was among the first African-American women to "cross over" into mainstream porn video. She is a member of the AVN Hall of Fame.

== Career ==
At age 19, Kelly began working in a peep show booth in an establishment called Cinema X in Michigan and would work there for two years. Afterwards, she began dancing topless at a bar and was approached by a photographer to appear in adult magazines. She would appear in magazines such as Cheri and Players, which led to offers to do adult films.

Kelly began her film career in 1985. During the period in which she was most active, 1986 through 1988, she made more than 100 original films — 53 in 1987 alone — but by the early-1990s she was appearing in fewer than five films a year. Kelly's final performance in an original film was in 1991.

Kelly was the first African American female star to receive a contract in the Adult Film Industry when she signed with Fantasy Home Video. On January 12, 2008, Kelly was inducted into the Adult Video News Hall of Fame. She was also inducted into the XRCO Hall of Fame on April 16, 2009.

== Mainstream appearances ==
In 1996, Kelly and Heather Hunter appeared in the music video of Tupac Shakur's How Do U Want It.
