= Jeannie Pepper =

American adult film actress (born 1958)

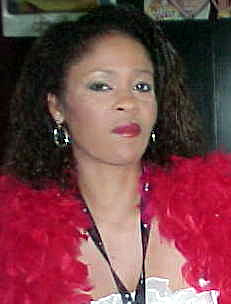
- Jeannie Pepper in 2000
- Born: July 9, 1958 (age 68); Chicago, Illinois, U.S.
- Occupation: Pornographic actress
- Height: 5 ft 7 in (1.70 m)

Jeannie Pepper (born July 9, 1958) is an American pornographic actress. She began in the business in 1982 at age 24 and has appeared in over 200 adult films. She was still an active actress as recently as 2011, participating in the mature adult genre.

Pepper was inducted into the AVN Hall of Fame in 1997, the first African American woman to be recognized with that honor. She won XRCO Award Erotic Video Award in 1987 and was inducted into the XRCO and Urban X Halls of Fame in 2008.

== Impact on black female sexuality ==
Pepper became an adult film actress and erotic model in her twenties, citing an enjoyment of viewing pornography and having sex. She expressed enthusiasm on becoming a member in an industry with few black female stars. Pepper said in an interview, "I just wanted to show the world. Look, I'm black and I'm beautiful. How come there are not more black women doing this?" Pepper did a photoshoot in Paris in 1986 wearing only a white fur coat and heels, while being photographed by her photographer husband, John Dragon. Pepper has stated that she found much self-esteem and fearlessness in showing the world her beauty; she felt she embodied black female sexuality.

== Filmography ==
=== Mainstream films ===
Pepper played Mrs. McReynolds in High School High (1996) and the photographer's model in Las Vegas Serial Killer (1986).

=== Music videos ===
Pepper was featured in a 1996 Tupac Shakur music video, "How Do You Want It?" alongside other African-American porn stars.
