= Wanted Dead or Alive (Tupac Shakur and Snoop Doggy Dogg song) =

Single by 2Pac and Snoop Doggy Dogg

from the album Gridlock'd
- Released: May 16, 1997
- Recorded: 1996
- Genre: G-funk
- Length: 4:39
- Label: Death Row
- Songwriters: Tupac Shakur; Calvin Broadus; Delmar Arnaud; Roger Troutman
- Producer: Dat Nigga Daz

2Pac singles chronology
"Smile" (1997)	"Wanted Dead or Alive" (1997)	"I Wonder If Heaven Got a Ghetto" (1997)

Snoop Doggy Dogg singles chronology
"Doggfather" (1997)	"Wanted Dead or Alive" (1997)	"Midnight Love" (1997)

Music video
- "Wanted Dead or Alive" on YouTube

"Wanted Dead or Alive" is a gangsta rap song by American West Coast hip-hop recording artists 2Pac and Snoop Doggy Dogg. It was released in January 1997 via Death Row Records as the lead single from Gridlock'd – The Soundtrack. Production was handled by Daz Dillinger, who utilized an interpolation of Zapp's "Dance Floor".

The song peaked at number 16 on the UK Singles Chart, number 12 on the UK Dance Singles chart and number 4 on the UK Hip Hop and R&B Singles chart. It also made it to number 3 in New Zealand and number 41 in Australia. The keyboards were done by Soopafly.

AllMusic's Andrew Hamilton described the song as "2Pac supplies the bullets with his aggressive, authentic, unmistakable delivery and Snoop's at his spacy best, laid-back, effective, super cool, and chronic mellow".

== Music video ==
An accompanying music video was directed by Scott Kalvert and released in February 1997. It shows the police trying to catch Snoop Dogg along with clips of the deceased rapper Tupac Shakur. The storyline is similar to "2 of Amerikaz Most Wanted".

== Track listing ==
No.	Title	Writer(s)	Producer(s)	Length
1.	"Wanted Dead or Alive"	Tupac Shakur; Calvin Broadus; Delmar Arnaud; Roger Troutman	Dat Nigga Daz
2.	"Never Had a Friend Like Me"	Shakur; Johnny Jackson	Johnny "J"
3.	"Life Is a Traffic Jam"	Shakur; Vondie Curtis-Hall; Mone Smith	Medusa

== Personnel ==
- Tupac "2Pac" Shakur – performer
- Calvin "Snoop Doggy Dogg" Broadus – performer (track 1)
- Eight Mile Road – performer (track 3)
- Delmar "Dat Nigga Daz" Arnaud – producer (track 1)
- Johnny Jackson – producer (track 2)
- Mone "Medusa" Smith – producer (track 3)

== Charts ==
Chart (1997)	Peak position
Australia (ARIA)	41
New Zealand (Recorded Music NZ)	3
Scottish Singles Sales (Official Charts)	38
UK Singles (Official Charts)	16
UK Dance (Official Charts)	12
UK Hip Hop/R&B (Official Charts)	4
