= Hit 'Em Up =

1996 diss track by 2Pac

- 1996 bootleg release

Song by 2Pac featuring Outlaw Immortalz
- A-side: "How Do U Want It"
- Released: June 4, 1996
- Recorded: October 31, 1995; April 29, 1996
- Studio: Can-Am Studios (Tarzana, Los Angeles)
- Genre: West Coast hip-hop; gangsta rap; G-funk; hardcore hip-hop
- Length: 5:13
- Label: Death Row; Interscope
- Songwriters: Tupac Shakur; Bruce Washington; Yafeu Fula; Malcolm Greenidge; Duane Hitchings; Paddy Kellett; Franne Golde; Dennis Lambert
- Producer: Johnny "J"

Music video
- "Hit 'Em Up" on YouTube

Audio sample
- file; help

"Hit 'Em Up" is a diss track by American rapper 2Pac, featuring the Outlawz. It is the B-side to the single "How Do U Want It", released on June 4, 1996. The song's lyrics contain extremely vicious insults to several East Coast rappers, chiefly Shakur's former friend turned rival, the Notorious B.I.G. (also referred to colloquially as Biggie Smalls). The song was recorded at Can Am Studios on April 19, 1996. A previous version of the song was recorded on October 31, 1995.

Reporter Chuck Philips, who interviewed Shakur at Can Am in 1995, described the song as "a caustic anti–East Coast jihad in which the rapper threatens to eliminate Biggie, Puffy, and a slew of Bad Boy artists and other New York acts". The song was produced by long-time collaborator Johnny "J". The video, itself described as infamous, includes impersonations of Biggie, Puffy and Junior M.A.F.I.A. member Lil' Kim.

"Hit 'Em Up" had a large role in exacerbating the East Coast–West Coast hip-hop rivalry. Following its release, the East Coast rappers insulted in the song responded through tracks of their own. The controversy surrounding the song is due in part to Shakur's murder in a drive-by-shooting only three months after its release. The song is regarded as among the greatest diss tracks ever recorded.

== Origins ==
"Hit 'Em Up" was written and recorded at Can-Am Recorders in 1996. For the song, Tupac Shakur recruited the members of the former group Dramacydal, with whom he had worked previously and was eager to work again. Together, the rappers (along with other associates) formed the original lineup of the Outlawz. The first and third verses are performed by Shakur, while the second verse is performed by Hussein Fatal, the fourth by Yaki Kadafi and the fifth by E.D.I. Mean. The bassline and the drum loop of the soundtrack are replayed samples from a song called "Don't Look Any Further" by ex-Temptation Dennis Edwards that was previously used in Eric B. & Rakim's Paid in Full, released in 1987.

The ferocity of Shakur's raging vocals, as said by long-time collaborator and the song's producer Johnny "J", was entirely authentic. He explained that Shakur was initially fueled by his anger against Biggie and Bad Boy Records for the belief that they had a role in the ambush and attack on Shakur on November 30, 1994. He claimed that Biggie and his crew knew of his shooting and wanted him dead. Shakur used this fury, which Johnny "J" described as "superhuman", to attack Biggie and other East Coast rappers. Johnny "J" also stated that he had never seen Shakur so angry and that the words he rapped were in no way an act, describing the recording process as the most "hard-core he had ever done." Although he was very happy with the work he had put into it and the resulting song, Johnny "J" went on to say that he had no desire to work on anything of that magnitude again.

Shakur was also enraged by Biggie's release of "Who Shot Ya?" only months after the shooting incident; though it did not mention Shakur by name, he believed it was directed towards him. Shakur admitted to releasing "Hit 'Em Up" as a response to "Who Shot Ya?". In a Vibe interview, the rapper called out Sean "Puffy" Combs and Smalls and accused both of them of setting him up, or of having knowledge of the attack and not warning him. He also singled out businessmen James Rosemond ("Jimmy Henchman"), and Jacques Agnant ("Haitian Jack") of orchestrating the assault. Shakur announced the names of his ostensible conspirators to Kevin Powell, a journalist for Vibe; however, to mask their true identities, Vibe referred to Henchman as "Booker" and Jack as "Nigel" in the published interview. Persons familiar with the interview say they used different names after the magazine received threats from Henchman. A former Vibe editor denied receiving threats, but neglected to explain why the magazine substituted aliases for Henchman and Haitian Jack.

== Composition ==
The lyrics in "Hit 'Em Up" were aimed primarily at Biggie and Puffy. Shakur viciously insults Biggie throughout – the first line by Shakur is "That's why I fucked your bitch, you fat motherfucker" referencing Biggie's estranged wife Faith Evans, who was coincidentally photographed posing without her wedding ring for a work shoot with Tupac at the time in the media. He then threatens further retaliation for the lines in "Who Shot Ya?", which he perceived were mocking his violent shooting at Quad Studios in the songs hook, by saying "Who shot me?/But you punks didn't finish/Now you're about to feel the wrath of a menace." He also used the song as a platform to express his belief that Biggie was guilty of stealing his style of rapping, and was merely imitating his lifestyle. This notion is addressed in the verse in "Now it's all about Versace, you copied my style." He also touches topically on their early friendship with the line "Biggie, remember when I used to let you sleep on the couch?" and their subsequent fallout. Towards the end of the song Tupac disses Mobb Deep, saying "Don't one of you niggas got sickle cell or something? You fucking with me, nigga you fuck around and get a seizure or a heart attack", referring to Prodigy, a member of Mobb Deep who suffered from sickle cell disease (and who died in 2017 after being hospitalized for complications related to the disease). Mobb Deep responded by releasing "Drop a Gem on 'em", which was released shortly before Tupac's death (but pulled from airplay rotation after). "Hit 'Em Up" features much profanity, using the words "fuck" or "motherfucker" 46 times in the song, and was issued a Parental Advisory label.

The chorus of "Hit 'Em Up" is a play on the chorus of Junior M.A.F.I.A's "Player's Anthem." The phrase "take money" is repeated throughout the song, which is a play on Junior M.A.F.I.A's recent release "Get Money", the remix of which (called "Gettin' Money") is also the beat used in "Hit 'Em Up". Faith Evans, who at the time was Biggie's estranged wife, was reportedly seen with Shakur after a public breakup with Biggie. Journalist Chuck Philips spotted Faith Evans at Can Am when he interviewed Shakur a year earlier in 1995. People at the studio told the reporter that Faith Evans also contributed – that the R&B chanteuse recorded one or more "Take Money" background vocals that would appear on "Hit Em Up." Regarding his October 1995 interview of the rapper, Philips remembered in 2012:

"I was so unaware of the bi-coastal rap war that I suspected nothing when Faith Evans appeared with Shakur at Can Am. The estranged wife of Biggie was recording background vocals for "Wonda Why They Call U Bitch", a song which was at the time yet to be released."

According to Shakur she had given him gifts of clothing, which he offered as proof of a relationship in an interview. Using this against Biggie in "Hit 'Em Up", Shakur continued to fuel the rumors of a sexual relationship with Evans in the song's line "You claim to be a player, but I fucked your wife." Claims of an affair with Evans appear three times in the song.

Shakur also attacked many other people associated with Bad Boy Records and with Biggie, such as Lil' Kim and Junior M.A.F.I.A. He exclaimed that their lifestyle and what they rapped about were fraudulent, and that they were not from the streets. He believed that they were only perpetuating the drama and did not understand the situation they were getting into. Bronx rapper Chino XL was also insulted for vulgar comments he made about Shakur on his song "Riiiot!". In the original recording, Shakur also insulted Jay-Z, Lil' Kim, and Lil' Cease at the ending segment, but removed it after partial issues with the microphone and being convinced by Outlawz members that they had nothing to do with the conflict between Death Row and Bad Boy.

Many places in the United States are mentioned in the song, including Brooklyn, California, the East Coast, New Jersey, New York and the West Coast, as well as the Brazilian city of Rio de Janeiro.

== Music video ==
Shot from the music video, with stand-in Biggie on the left, Shakur in the middle, and Lil' Kim on the right.

The music video for "Hit 'Em Up" was filmed in a warehouse off Slauson Avenue near the Fox Hills Mall in Los Angeles on June 3, 1996. It was filmed by the production company Look Hear Productions. Shakur raps in a white room with the Outlawz, as well as in purple-caged room and a black room with bullet holes in the background. TV monitors in the background show clips of Shakur, Puffy, and Biggie Smalls, and even clips from the video "Made Niggaz." The video featured actors who were recalled from their prior roles in the music video for "2 of Amerikaz Most Wanted" to impersonate some of those who were attacked in "Hit 'Em Up." This included Biggie, whose stand-in looks into the camera and sports a Kangol and jacket, similar to one Biggie would wear. During the moments where Shakur raps about his claimed affair with Evans, the Biggie impersonator crouches near the camera while Shakur yells in his face. Puffy is also impersonated, appearing with a high-top fade and leaning towards the camera, lowering and raising his sunglasses.

The music video for "Hit 'Em Up" can be found on Tupac: Live at the House of Blues DVD.

== Release and reception ==
Finishing the recording of the song, Shakur felt very positively about the track, saying;

"[The] song is going to be playing in every club, every country. Deejays are calling from everywhere, wanting to get a piece of this."

"Hit 'Em Up" appeared first as a B-side, on the single "How Do U Want It", by Shakur featuring the Outlawz. On June 4, 1996, under the label Death Row Records, "Hit 'Em Up" was released on compact disc, 12-inch, and a 45 RPM. The original cover for the single had Puffy's head on a snake's body, and Biggie's head on a pig's. It also appeared posthumously on several compilations, including the 2005 release of Shakur's last recorded live performance, Live at the House of Blues. "Hit 'Em Up" was also remixed on Nu-Mixx Klazzics. Upon its release, "Hit 'Em Up" received frequent radio airplay, which was attributed to the public interest in the ongoing feud and radio stations' desire to garner high ratings. However, some radio stations, such as the Los Angeles-based KPWR, refused to play it. The follow-up to "Hit 'Em Up" was the song "Bomb First (My Second Reply)".

"Hit 'Em Up" has been called "controversial," "infamous," "disturbing," and "brutal." Shakur's insults against virtually the entire East Coast scene of rappers were said to be ferocious. The song, along with "Dear Mama," has been viewed as one of Shakur's songs that resonated with and was spoken of the most by young people. Among associates of Shakur, it was called a "bad-luck song." Los Angeles radio director Bruce St. James called the song "the be-all, end-all, curse-word, dirty-lyric, violent song of all time." Documentary filmmaker Carl Weston believed that "most people in Biggie's shoes would have wanted to at least hurt Tupac" in a Spin magazine interview.

Among musicians, the song drew criticism from singer Dionne Warwick, and disapproval from fellow rappers Kool Moe Dee and Chuck D, as written in their book There's a God on the Mic: The True 50 Greatest MCs. They felt that although Shakur was one of the most substantive rappers of that period, he had gone too far with "Hit 'Em Up," causing some of Shakur's fans to turn on him, according to the two rappers. Ice-T wrote in his autobiography that, when Shakur played Hit 'Em Up to him before its release, he tried to persuade Shakur to contact Biggie and try to resolve their problems, rather than releasing the record. Ice-T added that Shakur was angered with this reaction and had hoped that he would have sided with the West Coast in the feud.

=== Aftermath ===
The song has been viewed as the turning point in the feud between Shakur and Biggie, where things were said and rapped which could never be taken back during the remainder of Shakur's life. This has led to its being dubbed as the centerpiece in what became the most venomous battle in the history of hip hop.

"Hit 'Em Up" has been studied by and with academics, and it has been used as a part of a series of lessons for building the means to communicate with younger people. Its main role in these lessons is to define anger in rap music. Biggie was shot and killed six months after Shakur's death.

== Response ==
=== From Biggie ===
After hearing "Hit 'Em Up", Biggie continued proclaiming his innocence in the shooting incident. He also claimed that "Who Shot Ya?" had been written before Shakur was shot, and was therefore not about him. Regarding the lyrics aimed at his wife Faith, Biggie expressed an inability to find merit in what Shakur had claimed. He believed that Shakur intended to attack him through Faith, although he remained unsure of whether an encounter between them had occurred. Ultimately, he thought that if something had occurred it was none of his business, and that Shakur should not have publicly disclosed this information in a song. Biggie responded to this matter in a similar fashion to "Hit 'Em Up", rapping in a joint release by himself and Jay-Z in the song "Brooklyn's Finest", where he says "If Faye have twins, she'd probably have two Pacs. Get it? Tupac's?" Shortly after the release of "Hit 'Em Up", Evans went on the radio and admitted that she had been with Shakur, but continued to deny their relationship was sexual.

=== From other artists ===
Puffy had trouble understanding the sheer rage Shakur had expressed for Biggie in "Hit 'Em Up". He also responded by reinforcing his and Biggie's innocence regarding the shooting and went on to say that prior to the incident they "were friends", and that they "would have never done nothing to hurt him." In an interview with Vibe Magazine concerning Shakur's allegations of Biggie and Puffy having prior knowledge of the ambush, Puffy stated:

He ain't mad at the niggas that shot him; he knows where they're at. He knows who shot him. If you ask him, he knows, and everybody in the street knows, and he's not stepping to them, because he knows that he's not gonna get away with that shit. To me, that's some real sucker shit. Be mad at everybody, man; don't be using niggas as scapegoats. We know that he's a nice guy from New York. All shit aside, Tupac is a nice, good-hearted guy.

Lil' Kim responded on the original version of her song "Big Momma Thang", which was aimed at Biggie's wife, Faith Evans, and Shakur. Junior M.A.F.I.A. recorded a music video for the song "Get Money", which has been regarded as a diss to Shakur. Biggie denied these claims, stating: "It's just a video; ain't nobody got no time to make no diss on nobody." Lil' Cease said after the release that Biggie still had love for Shakur, and even respected him. The attack on Mobb Deep came as a response for their involvement on the song "L.A L.A" by Capone-N-Noreaga, which was a retaliation to Snoop Dogg and Tha Dogg Pound's song "New York, New York" music video in which members of Tha Dogg Pound and Death Row are seen knocking down buildings in New York City. Mobb Deep responded to Shakur with the track "Drop a Gem on 'em". It was first released as a promotional single, and later appeared on their album Hell on Earth. Lyrically, it did not specifically name Shakur, but it did allude to the shooting incident. It has also been noted for erroneously stating the cost of the assets Shakur had taken from him during the shooting incident. Bronx rapper King Sun also responded to Shakur with "New York Love (All Eyez On Sun)".

== Appearances ==
"Hit 'Em Up" was originally featured as a B-side on Shakur's single "How Do U Want It". In 1998, it was released on Shakur's first compilation album, Greatest Hits. A remix of the song was featured on Nu-Mixx Klazzics (2003), with the intro lyrics from the originally explicit version and the main lyrics from the edited radio version. A live version of the song was included on the 2005 release of Tupac: Live at the House of Blues. "Hit 'Em Up" was later released on Death Row Greatest Hits, and was again released as a live recording on the 2004 album 2Pac Live.

In the second half of Eminem's song "Quitter", the rapper attempts to remake "Hit 'Em Up" and in itself is a diss track aimed towards Everlast. Eminem has support from D12 on his version like the Outlawz supported Shakur on the original. "What I Think About You" by Bow Wow uses a reinterpolation of "Hit 'Em Up" and is a diss song to fellow rapper Soulja Boy Tell 'em.

The song appears in the Tupac biopic All Eyez On Me (2017), in which Tupac performs the song during his 1996 House Of Blues Concert in the film as a message to Biggie, talking about having relations with Faith Evans, Biggie's wife.

== Cover version ==
Producers Cain McKnight and Jonathan Hay reimagined ″Hit 'Em Up″ in the genres of house music and jazz with Fat Beats Records.

== Charts ==
Chart (2022–2025)	Peak position
Greece International (IFPI)	62
Hungary (Single Top 40)	38
UK Hip Hop/R&B (Official Charts)	26

== Certifications ==
Region	Certification	Certified units/sales
Denmark (IFPI Danmark)	Platinum	90,000^{‡}
Germany (BVMI)	Gold	300,000^{‡}
Italy (FIMI)	Gold	50,000^{‡}
New Zealand (RMNZ)	5× Platinum	150,000^{‡}
United Kingdom (BPI)	Platinum	600,000^{‡}
Streaming
Greece (IFPI Greece)	Platinum	2,000,000^{†}
^{‡} Sales+streaming figures based on certification alone.^{†} Streaming-only figures based on certification alone.

== See also ==
- List of notable diss tracks
