= Smile (Scarface song) =

Single by Scarface featuring 2Pac and Johnny P.

from the album The Untouchable
- B-side: "Untouchable"
- Released: February 13, 1997
- Recorded: August 1996
- Genre: G-funk; R&B
- Length: 5:23
- Label: Rap-A-Lot; Noo Trybe
- Songwriters: Brad Jordan; Tupac Shakur; Mike Dean
- Producers: Scarface; Mike Dean; Tone Capone

Scarface singles chronology
"Among the Walking Dead" (1995)	"Smile" (1997)	"Mary Jane" (1997)

2Pac singles chronology
"Hail Mary" (1997)	"Smile" (1997)	"Wanted Dead or Alive" (1997)

"Smile" is the lead single released from Scarface's fourth album, The Untouchable. The song features fellow rapper 2Pac and R&B singer, Johnny P. "Smile" was produced by Scarface, Mike Dean and Tone Capone. The song became Scarface's most successful single to date, making it to number 12 on the Billboard Hot 100.

Music executive J Prince, in a 2018 interview with Rap Radar, stated that he asked Puff Daddy if the Notorious B.I.G. would also like to feature on the song, but after discovering that 2Pac would feature, he declined. The chorus contains an interpolation of "Tell Me If You Still Care" by The S.O.S. Band.

== Single track listing ==
=== B-Side ===
1. "Untouchable" (Radio Edit)- 3:38
2. "Untouchable" (Instrumental)- 3:59

== Music video ==
The music video was released for the week ending on April 27, 1997.

== Charts ==
Chart (1997)	Peak position
US Billboard Hot 100	12
US Hot R&B/Hip-Hop Songs (Billboard)	4
US Hot Rap Songs (Billboard)	2
US R&B/Hip-Hop Airplay (Billboard)	19

== Certifications ==
Region	Certification	Certified units/sales
United States (RIAA)	Gold	500,000^{^}
^{^} Shipments figures based on certification alone.
