= All Eyez on Me =

Studio album by 2Pac
- Released: February 13, 1996
- Recorded: October 13 – December 18, 1995
- Studio: Can-Am Studios (Tarzana, Los Angeles)
- Genres: West Coast hip-hop; gangsta rap; G-funk
- Length: 132:20
- Labels: Death Row; Interscope
- Producers: 2Pac; Bobcat; Dat Nigga Daz; DeVante Swing; DJ Pooh; DJ Quik; Doug Rasheed; Dr. Dre; Johnny "J"; Mike Mosley; QDIII; Rick Rock

2Pac chronology
Me Against the World (1995)	All Eyez on Me (1996)	The Don Killuminati: The 7 Day Theory (1996)

Singles from All Eyez on Me
- 1. "California Love" Released: December 3, 1995; 2. "2 of Amerikaz Most Wanted" Released: May 7, 1996; 3. "How Do U Want It" Released: June 4, 1996; 4. "I Ain't Mad at Cha" Released: September 15, 1996

All Eyez on Me is the fourth studio album by American rapper 2Pac and the final to be released during his lifetime. It was released on February 13, 1996 – just seven months before his death – by Death Row and Interscope Records with distribution handled by Polygram. The album features guest appearances from Dr. Dre, Snoop Doggy Dogg, Redman, Method Man, Nate Dogg, Kurupt, Daz Dillinger, E-40, K-Ci & JoJo, and the Outlawz, among others. It was produced by Shakur alongside a variety of producers including DJ Quik, Johnny "J", Dr. Dre, DJ Bobcat, Dat Nigga Daz, Mr. Dalvin, DJ Pooh, and DeVante Swing, among others. The album was mixed by DJ Quik. It was the only Death Row/Interscope release that was distributed through PolyGram in the United States.

A gangsta rap album, All Eyez on Me sees 2Pac rap about his experiences of living in poverty and in luxury; critics particularly note that 2Pac widely diverges from the social and political consciousness of 2Pacalypse Now (1991), Strictly 4 My N.I.G.G.A.Z... (1993) and Me Against The World (1995). The album includes the Billboard Hot 100 number-one singles "How Do U Want It" (featuring K-Ci and JoJo) and "California Love" (with Dr. Dre, featuring Roger Troutman) and the hip-hop ballad "I Ain't Mad at Cha", along with the Snoop Doggy Dogg collaboration "2 of Amerikaz Most Wanted" as a promotional single. It featured four singles in all, the most of any of Shakur's albums. Moreover, All Eyez on Me made history as the first ever double-full-length hip-hop solo studio album released for mass consumption globally.

All Eyez on Me was the second album by 2Pac to chart at number one on both the Billboard 200 and the Top R&B/Hip-Hop Albums charts, selling 566,000 copies in the first week. Seven months later, 2Pac was murdered in a drive-by shooting. The album won the 1997 Soul Train Music Award for Rap Album of the Year posthumously, and was also posthumously nominated for Best Rap Album at the 39th Grammy Awards in 1997. Shakur also won the award for Favorite Rap/Hip-Hop Artist at the American Music Awards of 1997. Upon release, All Eyez on Me received mostly positive reviews from critics and was praised for its innovation in the rap genre; it has since been ranked by critics as one of the greatest hip-hop albums, as well as one of the greatest albums of all time. It was certified Diamond by the Recording Industry Association of America (RIAA) in 2014, with shipments of over 5 million copies (each disc in the double album counted as a separate unit for certification), and in 2020 was ranked 436th on Rolling Stone's updated list of the 500 Greatest Albums of All Time.

== Background ==
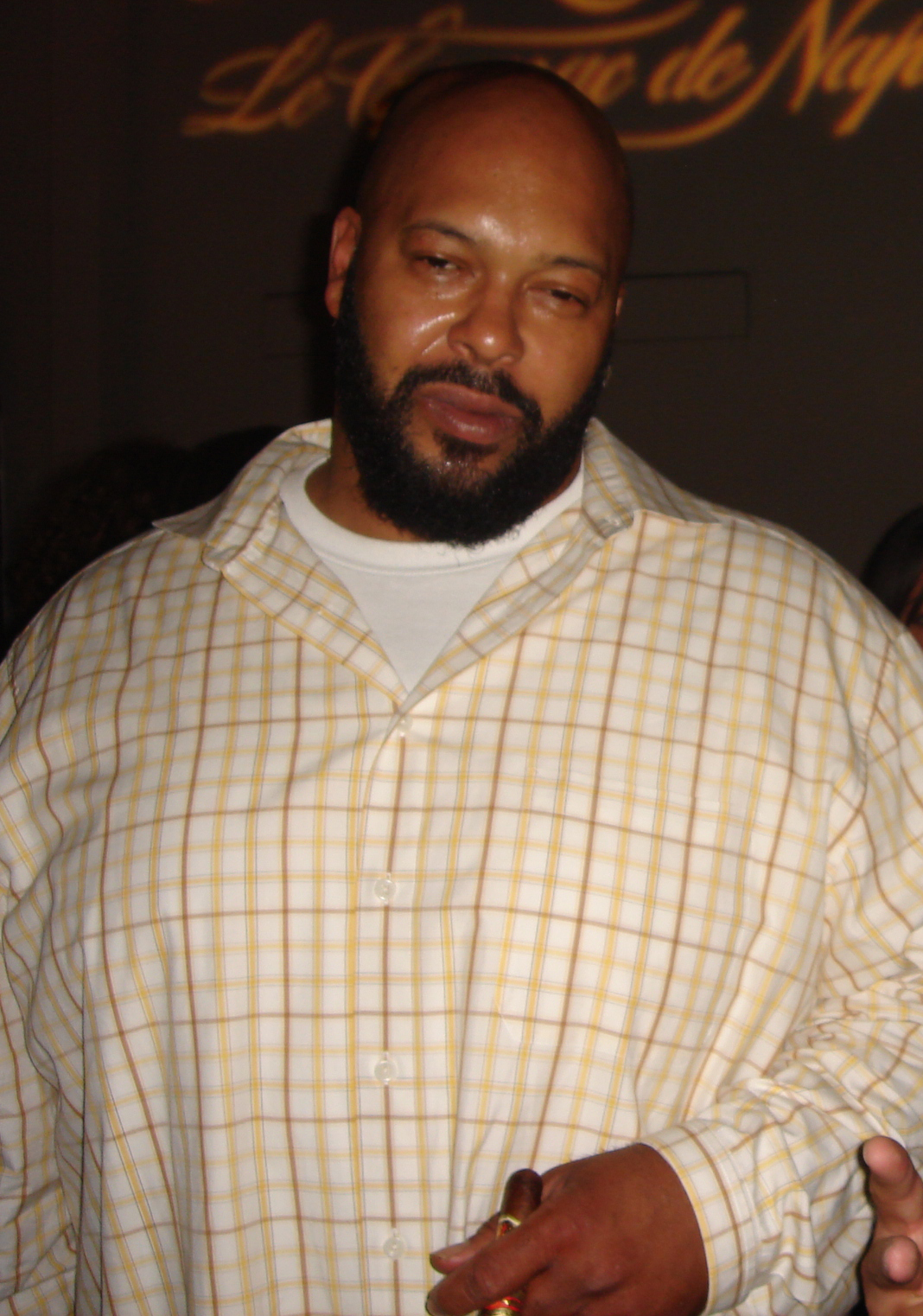
Suge Knight, CEO of Death Row Records and executive producer of All Eyez on Me

In October 1995, Suge Knight and Jimmy Iovine paid the $1.4 million bail necessary to get Shakur released from Clinton Correctional Facility, on charges of sexual abuse. At the time, Shakur was broke and thus unable to make bail himself. All Eyez on Me was released following an agreement between Knight and Shakur which stated Shakur would make three albums under Death Row Records in return for them paying his bail. Fulfilling part of Shakur's brand new contract, this double-album served as the first two albums of his three-album contract.

Euthanasia was the initial title of the album until it was changed to All Eyez on Me during the recording process. Shakur explained to MTV's Bill Bellamy in December 1995 saying:

It's called All Eyez on Me. That's how I feel it is. I got the police watching me, the Feds. I got the females that want to charge me with false charges and sue me and all that. I got the females that like me. I got the jealous homeboys and I got the homies that roll with me. Everybody's looking to see what I'mma do now so All Eyez on Me.

All Eyez on Me was originally intended for a Christmas 1995 release but was pushed back as Shakur continued to record music and shoot music videos for the album.

== Recording and production ==
The album features guest spots from 2Pac's regulars, such as former-Thug Life members and The Outlawz, as well as Dr. Dre, Snoop Doggy Dogg, Tha Dogg Pound, Nate Dogg, George Clinton, Rappin' 4-Tay, The Click, Method Man & Redman among others. The song "Heartz of Men" samples a portion of Richard Pryor's comedy album That Nigger's Crazy. Most of the album was produced by Johnny "J" and Daz Dillinger, with help from Dr. Dre on the songs "California Love", which he himself appeared in also as an album guest spot, and "Can't C Me", which was Clinton's appearance. DJ Quik also produced, mixed and made an appearance on the album, but had to use his real name on the credits because his contract with Profile Records prevented him from using his stage name.

=== Lyrical themes ===
The songs on All Eyez on Me are, in general, unapologetic celebrations of living the "Thug Lifestyle". Though there is the occasional reminiscence about past and present friends, it is a definite move away from the social and political consciousness of 2Pacalypse Now and Strictly 4 My N.I.G.G.A.Z.... The songs on the album along with the name of the album itself, allude to the feeling of being watched. With songs like "Can't C Me" and "All Eyez on Me", 2Pac makes it known that he feels the presence of surveillance, most notably by the police and those wishing to do him harm. The album also references the fact that 2Pac is under the attention of many fans, being his fourth studio album and his first after spending almost a year in jail.

== Singles ==
The first single, "California Love" featuring Dr. Dre and Roger Troutman was released, December 3, 1995. This is perhaps 2Pac's best-known song and his most successful, reaching number one on the Billboard Hot 100 for eight weeks (as a double A-side single with "How Do U Want It") and 12 weeks at number one in New Zealand. The song was nominated for a Grammy Award for Best Rap Performance by a Duo or Group (with Dr. Dre and Roger Troutman) in 1997. A remix version also produced by Dr. Dre appeared on the album. The song has since been certified 2× platinum by the Recording Industry Association of America.

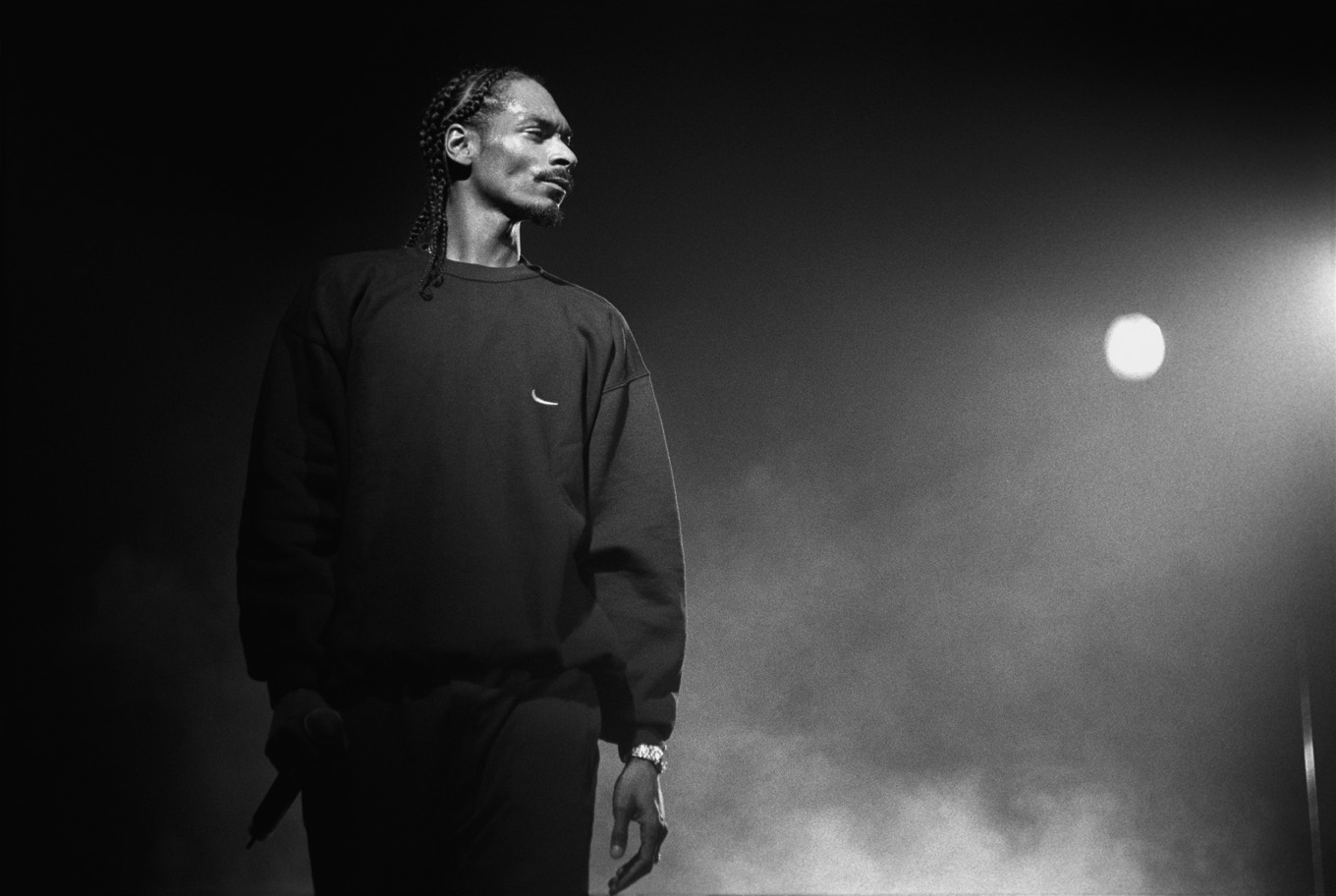
Rapper Snoop Doggy Dogg made an appearance on the album's second single "2 of Amerikaz Most Wanted"

"2 of Amerikaz Most Wanted" featuring rapper Snoop Doggy Dogg, was released as a promotional single on, May 7, 1996. The video was directed by one of 2Pac's production partners, Gobi M. Rahimi and was filmed four months prior to the September 1996 shooting of 2Pac. The prelude for the song shows a parody of Biggie Smalls ("Piggie") and Puff Daddy ("Buff Daddy") in discussion with Shakur about the November 1994 shooting. The beginning of the scene where Tupac is speaking to Biggie is in reference to the scene in the film Scarface in which Tony Montana speaks to his alleged killer before shooting him. The song peaked at number 46 on the US Billboard Hot R&B/Hip-Hop Airplay chart.

The second single, "How Do U Want It" featuring R&B duo K-Ci & JoJo, was released, June 4, 1996. It was paired with "California Love" as a double A-side single, with 2 of Amerikaz Most Wanted and the non-album track, Hit 'Em Up serving as the B-sides. The song reached number one on the Billboard Hot 100. There were three videos filmed for the song: two in the same set for the single in April 1996. The video was directed by Ron Hightower and produced by Tracy D. Robinson. These two are distinguished by MPAA rating (one is certified adult material). The video portrays a wild sex party with Jacuzzi, mechanical bull riding, cage dancing and pole stripping. All actors and actresses are dressed in Renaissance-era costumes, though all clothes are removed for the nude clip. The adult-material video also features numerous porn stars, including Nina Hartley, Heather Hunter, and Angel Kelly. The limousine segment seen in the clean version is the same except no nudity. The third one is the concert version, mostly them performing on stage. There are cameo appearances by K-Ci & JoJo, and fellow group member of Digital Underground Shock G both in the concert and studio segments.

"I Ain't Mad at Cha" featuring singer Danny Boy, was released in Europe and parts of Oceania shortly after Shakur's death as the final single from the album, on September 15, 1996. For the video the song was re-recorded with a live band. The new track was recorded at Can-Am Studios by Conley Abrams. The video was filmed on May 15, 1996.

== Critical reception and legacy ==
1996 professional reviews
Review scores
Source	Rating
Entertainment Weekly	B+
The Guardian	2/5 stars
Los Angeles Times	3.5/4 stars
NME	9/10
Rolling Stone	3/5 stars
Spin	7/10
USA Today	3/4 stars

All Eyez on Me was generally well received by music critics. In the Los Angeles Times, Cheo Hodari Coker hailed it as "a 27-song, 133-minute gangster's paradise", adding that "He displays no remorse for his tough life, and even less feeling for his enemies. The only thing jail time did for 2Pac was make his creative fires burn even hotter—he raps here with a passion and skill matched in gangsta rap only by Snoop Doggy Dogg and the Notorious B.I.G. And with such producers as DJ Pooh, DJ Quik, Dr. Dre and Johnny J laying down the tracks, he finally has a musical team worthy of his talent." David Browne of Entertainment Weekly praised the "Egyptian-snake-charmer keyboards, creamy choruses chanted by wet-lipped women, and police whistles used musically," noting that "Serving time has neither mellowed nor reformed him," calling 2Pac "the hardest-working ex-con in showbiz." Roger Morton of NME called the album "musical psychotherapy", noting that it's "a grittier, bloodier, nastier, more twisted and more gripping record" than Me Against the World. Sue Cummings of Spin commented, "As long as you don't expect philanthropy from Tupac, you'll find honesty and some pleasurably twisted scenarios."

Some reviewers were more critical of the lyrical content. Jon Pareles of The New York Times considered the album typical gangsta-rap fare, but with superior production. "Standard images of ghetto desperation turn up...but far more of 2Pac's rhymes are about living in luxury: driving a plush car, drinking cognac, smoking weed and having all the women he wants." Pareles notes that, "while 2Pac used to show some sympathy for women, he has returned to hard-line gangsta machismo, with women as either gold-digging 'bitches' or heavy-breathing, pliant 'hos'." The Guardian declared that "one of these angry recriminatory discs would have been more than enough, thanks", finding that "too much of the two hours is consumed by self-justifying rants like Only God Can Judge Me and Skandalouz." The review concluded that "There is some delicious g-funk here [...] but 2Pac's attitude sours the whole thing." "It's like a Cali thug-life version of Pink Floyd's The Wall – pure gangsta ego run amok over two CDs," complained Rolling Stone's Laura Jamison. "At that length, the album's all-hard-all-the-time tone approaches caricature."

=== Retrospect ===
Retrospective professional reviews
Review scores
Source	Rating
AllMusic	5/5 stars
Encyclopedia of Popular Music	4/5 stars
Pitchfork	9.4/10
Q	4/5 stars
The Rolling Stone Album Guide	5/5 stars
The Source	5/5 stars
XXL	5/5

All Eyez on Me has received retrospective critical acclaim. AllMusic's Steve Huey regarded it as "a monumental epic" that contains "the best production 2Pac's ever had on record". Describing it as "an unabashed embrace of the gangsta lifestyle", he concluded, "Erratic though it may be, All Eyez on Me is nonetheless carried off with the assurance of a legend in his own time, and it stands as 2Pac's magnum opus." Paul A. Thompson of Pitchfork remarked that the album is "an exhaustive survey of Tupac's brain matter at the most harrowing time in his young life. It captures him at his most vulnerable and provocative. He executes an array of styles at an almost impossibly high skill level that never feels like an exercise in form. What could have been (and perhaps what was) a creative work made out of obligation turned into a bloodletting, a remarkable final document from one of his era's defining voices."

In 2002, The Source, who did not review the album upon its release, awarded it a perfect five mic rating. Similarly, in 2007, XXL gave it the maximum "XXL" rating in its retrospective issue. In 2020, the album was ranked number 436 on the list of Rolling Stone's 500 Greatest Albums of All Time.

=== Accolades ===
- Asterisk (*) signifies unordered lists.

Publication	Country	Accolade	Year	Rank
FNAC	France	The 1000 Best Albums of All Time	2008	461
Rock & Folk	France	The Best Albums from 1963 to 1999	1999	*
Babylon	Greece	The 50 Best Albums of the 1990s	1999	48
Hip-Hop Connection	United Kingdom	The 100 Greatest Rap Albums 1995–2005	2006	35
The New Nation	United Kingdom	Top 100 Albums by Black Artists	2005	64
Q	United Kingdom	The Ultimate Music Collection	2005	*
Q	United Kingdom	90 Albums of the 90s	1999	*
Apple Music	United States	100 Best Albums	2024	62
rap.About.com	United States	100 Greatest Hip Hop Albums	2008	80
rap.About.com	United States	Best Rap Albums of 1996	2008	1
Tom Moon	United States	1000 Recordings to Hear Before You Die	2008	*
Entertainment Weekly	United States	The 100 Best Albums from 1983 to 2008	2008	87
Entertainment Weekly	United States	Top 10 Albums of 1996	1996	3
Ego Trip	United States	Hip Hop's 25 Greatest Albums by Year 1980–1998	1999	14
Rolling Stone	United States	The Essential Recordings of the 90s	1999	*
Rolling Stone	United States	100 Best Albums of the Nineties	2010	50
Rolling Stone	United States	The 500 Greatest Albums of All Time	2020	436
Complex	United States	The 90 Best Rap Albums of the '90s	2014	10

== Commercial performance ==
All Eyez on Me debuted at number-one on both the US Billboard 200 and the US Top R&B/Hip-Hop Albums charts, selling 566,000 copies in its first week, becoming 2Pac's second number one album on the chart. The album was eventually certified diamond by the Recording Industry Association of America (RIAA). As of September 2011, All Eyez on Me has sold 5,887,630 in the United States, making it 2Pac's highest-selling album. It has charted on the Billboard 200 for 105 weeks in total.

In the United Kingdom, the British Phonographic Industry certified the album silver on January 1, 1997, followed by gold on July 22, 2013, and platinum on November 14, 2014, for sales of over 300,000 copies in the United Kingdom.

It was re-released in 2001 as enhanced CDs containing the "California Love" music video. Both discs contained the same data track. It was also re-released as a Dual-Disc in 2005.

== Lawsuit ==
In July 1997, anti-rap activist C. Delores Tucker sued 2Pac's estate in federal court, claiming that lyrics naming her in "How Do U Want It" and "Wonda Why They Call U Bytch" inflicted emotional distress, were slanderous, and invaded her privacy. The case was dismissed in 2001.

== Track listing ==
- Track listing adapted from the album booklet

Disc 1: Book 1
No.	Title	Writer(s)	Producer(s)	Length
1.	"Ambitionz az a Ridah"	Tupac Shakur; Delmar Arnaud	Dat Nigga Daz	4:39
2.	"All About U" (featuring Snoop Doggy Dogg, Nate Dogg, Yaki Kadafi, Hussein Fatal and Dru Down)	Shakur; Johnny Jackson; Calvin Broadus; Larry Blackmon; Yafeu Fula; Bruce Washington; Thomas Jenkins; Nathaniel Hale	Johnny "J"; 2Pac	4:37
3.	"Skandalouz" (featuring Nate Dogg)	Shakur; Arnaud	Dat Nigga Daz	4:09
4.	"Got My Mind Made Up" (featuring Tha Dogg Pound and Method Man & Redman)	Shakur; Arnaud; Ricardo Brown; Reginald Noble; Clifford Smith	Dat Nigga Daz	5:13
5.	"How Do U Want It" (featuring K-Ci & JoJo)	Shakur; Jackson; Bruce Fisher; Quincy Jones; Leon Ware; Stanley Richardson	Johnny "J"	4:47
6.	"2 of Amerikaz Most Wanted" (featuring Snoop Doggy Dogg)	Shakur; Broadus; Arnaud	Dat Nigga Daz	4:07
7.	"No More Pain"	Shakur; Smith; Donald DeGrate; Robert Diggs	DeVante Swing	6:15
8.	"Heartz of Men"	Shakur; David Blake; Prince Nelson; George Clinton; Bernie Worrell; William Collins; Clarence Haskins	DJ Quik	4:44
9.	"Life Goes On"	Shakur; Jackson; Charles Simmons; Joseph Jefferson	Johnny "J"	5:02
10.	"Only God Can Judge Me" (featuring Rappin' 4-Tay)	Shakur; Doug Rasheed; Anthony Forté; Harold Fretty	Doug Rasheed; Harold Scrap Freddie	4:57
11.	"Tradin' War Stories" (featuring Dramacydal, C-Bo, and Storm)	Shakur; Mike Mosley; James Brown; Ricardo Thomas; Mutah Beale; Malcolm Greenidge; Katari Cox; Betty Newsome; Shawn Thomas	Mike Mosley; Rick Rock	5:30
12.	"California Love (Remix)" (featuring Dr. Dre and Roger Troutman)	Shakur; Andre Young; James Anderson; Roger Troutman; Larry Troutman; Norman Durham; Woody Cunningham; Ronnie Hudson; Mikel Hooks; Chris Stainton; Joe Cocker	Dr. Dre	6:25
13.	"I Ain't Mad at Cha" (featuring Danny Boy)	Shakur; Arnaud; Danny Stewart; Etterlene Jordan	Dat Nigga Daz	4:54
14.	"What'z Ya Phone #" (featuring Danny Boy)	Shakur; Jackson	Johnny "J"; 2Pac	5:08
Total length:				70:27

Disc 2: Book 2
No.	Title	Writer(s)	Producer(s)	Length
1.	"Can't C Me" (featuring George Clinton)	Shakur; Young; Clinton	Dr. Dre	5:31
2.	"Shorty Wanna Be a Thug"	Shakur; Jackson; Young; Douglas Edwards; Thomas Richardson	Johnny "J"	3:52
3.	"Holla at Me"	Shakur; Bobby Ervin	Bobby "Bobcat" Ervin	4:55
4.	"Wonda Why They Call U Bytch"	Shakur; Jackson	Johnny "J"; 2Pac	4:19
5.	"When We Ride" (featuring Outlaw Immortalz)	Shakur; Washington; Fula; Mark Jordan; Tyruss Himes	DJ Pooh	5:09
6.	"Thug Passion" (featuring Dramacydal, Jewell, and Storm)	Shakur; Jackson; L. Troutman; R. Troutman; Greenidge; Beale; Cox; Shirley Murdock; Jewell Caples; Donna Harkness	Johnny "J"; 2Pac	5:08
7.	"Picture Me Rollin'" (featuring Danny Boy, Syke, and CPO)	Shakur; Jackson; Himes; Vince Edwards; Alton Taylor; Claydes Smith; David Saïd; Dennis Thomas; George Brown; Otha Nash; Richard Westfield; Robert Bell; Robert Mickens; Ronald Bell; Terence N’guyen	Johnny "J"	5:15
8.	"Check Out Time" (featuring Kurupt and Syke)	Shakur; Jackson; Himes; Brown	Johnny "J"; 2Pac	4:39
9.	"Ratha Be Ya Nigga" (featuring Richie Rich)	Shakur; Rasheed; Clinton; Collins; Gary Cooper	Doug Rasheed	4:14
10.	"All Eyez on Me" (featuring Syke)	Shakur; Jackson; Himes; James Pennington; Jürgen Koppers; Thor Baldursson	Johnny "J"	5:08
11.	"Run tha Streetz" (featuring Michel'le, Mutah, and Storm)	Shakur; Jackson; Beale	Johnny "J"; 2Pac	5:17
12.	"Ain't Hard 2 Find" (featuring E-40, B-Legit, C-Bo, and Richie Rich)	Shakur; Mosley; R. Thomas; S. Thomas; Earl Stevens; Brandt Jones; Danell Stevens	Mike Mosley; Rick Rock	4:29
13.	"Heaven Ain't Hard 2 Find"	Shakur; Quincy Jones III	QDIII	3:58
Total length:				61:54

Original UK edition bonus track
No.	Title	Writer(s)	Producer	Length
14.	"California Love" (short radio edit; featuring Dr. Dre and Roger Troutman)	Shakur; Young; Anderson; R. Troutman; L. Troutman; Durham; Cunningham; Hudson; Hooks; Cocker; Stainton	Dr. Dre	4:01
Total length:				136:21

Notes

- "All About U" features uncredited verses from Hussein Fatal and Yaki Kadafi
- "Life Goes On" features vocals from Stacey Smallie and Nanci Fletcher.
- "California Love (Remix)" features background vocals from Barbara Wilson, Nanci Fletcher, and Danette Williams. The full original version can only be found on promo vinyl versions.
- "Can't C Me" features additional vocals from Nanci Fletcher
- "Got My Mind Made Up" originally was a Dogg Pound song featuring Wu-Tang Clan member Inspectah Deck, The Lady of Rage, and RBX, but their vocals were removed when Daz gave 2Pac the song for his album.
- "Wonder Why They Call U Bytch" originally featured former Bad Boy Records singer Faith Evans, but her vocals were replaced by Jewell.
- "Check Out Time" features background vocals from Natasha Walker.
- "Ratha Be Ya Nigga" features background vocals from Stacey Smallie.

== Leftover and extra tracks ==
Most of the songs on the list were remixed on posthumous 2Pac albums Still I Rise, Until the End of Time, Better Dayz and Pac's Life.

- "All About U (Solo Video Version)" featuring Nate Dogg
- "Ambitionz Az A Fighta (Mike Tyson Mix)"
- "Better Dayz" (Remixed on the album of the same name)
- Ballad of a Dead Soulja (Original Version) (Remixed on Until the End of Time)
- "Come With Me (Interlude)" feat. Danny Boy
- "Da Struggle Continuez" feat. Hussein Fatal, O.F.T.B. & Big Syke
- "Don't Fall Asleep (Original Version)" feat. Daz Dillinger, E.D.I. Mean, Hussein Fatal & Kastro (Remixed on Pac's Life)
- "Don't Stop The Music (Original Version)" feat. E.D.I. Mean, Hussein Fatal & Nanci Fletcher (Remixed on Pac's Life)
- "You Can't (Fade Me)" feat. Jewell, Kastro & Napoleon (Leaked Online)
- "Fair Xchange (Original Version)" feat. Tyrone Wrice & Cappucine Jackson (Remixed on Better Dayz)
- "Fuck 'Em All (Original Version)" feat. E.D.I. Mean, Kastro & Napoleon (Remixed on Better Dayz)
- "Give Me Love" feat. 6 Feet Deep
- "Komradz" feat. E.D.I. Mean, Kastro, Mussolini, Napoleon & Storm (Leaked Online)
- "Late Night" feat. DJ Quik & AMG (Appeared on Suge Knight Represents: The Chronic 2000 - Still Smokin' and Better Dayz before being taken off of new CD releases and all digital versions)
- "Letter 2 My Unborn (Original Version)" feat. Natasha Walker (Remixed on Until the End of Time)
- "Ma Babiez Mama" featuring Outlawz
- "M.O.B. (Money Over Bitchez) (Original Version)" feat. Big Syke, Hussein Fatal, Mopreme Shakur & Yaki Kadafi (Remixed on Until the End of Time)
- "Penitentiary Bound" feat. Dramacydal & Mopreme Shakur
- "R U Still Smiling For Me?"
- "Secretz Of War (Original Version)" feat. Hussein Fatal, Kurupt & Yaki Kadafi
- "Soon As I Get Home" feat. Yaki Kadafi (Appeared in original form on Pac's Life)
- "Still Ballin (Original Version)" feat. Kurupt (Remixed on Better Dayz)
- "Still I Rise (Original Version)" feat. Big Syke, Hussein Fatal & Yaki Kadafi (Remixed on the album of the same name)
- "There U Go (Original Version)" feat. Big Syke, Kastro & Yaki Kadafi (Remixed on Better Dayz)
- "The: Thugz"
- Thug N U Thug N Me (Original Version) (Original Version later leaked online) (Remixed on Until the End of Time)
- "U Can Call (Original Version)" (Remixed on Better Dayz)
- "What'z Next (Original Version)" feat. Mopreme Shakur, Big Syke, Prince Ital Joe & Natasha Walker (Remixed on Pac's Life)
- "When I Get Free III (Original Version)" (Remixed on Until the End of Time)
- "Where U Been" feat. Danny Boy, Hussein Fatal, Napoleon & Big Syke

== Sample credits ==
Ambitionz az a Ridah

- "Pee-Wee's Dance" performed by Joeski Love

All About U

- "Candy" performed by Cameo

Got My Mind Made Up

- "I Got My Mind Made Up (You Can Get It Girl)" performed by Instant Funk
- "Sucker M.C.'s" performed by Run–D.M.C.
- "Eric B. is President" performed by Eric B. & Rakim

How Do U Want It

- "Body Heat" performed by Quincy Jones

2 of Amerikaz Most Wanted

- "The Message" performed by Grandmaster Flash and the Furious Five
- Radio Activity Rapp (Let's Jam)" performed by MC Frosty and Lovin' C
- "The Posse (Shoot 'Em Up)" performed by Intelligent Hoodlum

No More Pain

- "Bring the Pain" performed by Method Man

Heartz of Men

- "Darling Nikki" performed by Prince and The Revolution
- "Mudbone - Intro" performed by Richard Pryor
- "Up for the Down Stroke" performed by Parliament
- "You're Gettin' a Little Too Smart" performed by The Detroit Emeralds
- "The Back Down" performed by Richard Pryor
- "Nigger With a Seizure" performed by Richard Pryor
- "Jim Brown" performed by Richard Pryor

Life Goes On

- "Brandy" performed by The O'Jays

Only God Can Judge Me

- "Top Billin'" performed by Audio Two

Tradin' War Stories

- "Too Little in Common" performed by Randy Brown

California Love (Remix)

- "So Ruff, So Tuff" performed by Roger Troutman
- "Intimate Connection" performed by Kleeer
- "Woman to Woman" by Joe Cocker
- "West Coast Poplock" performed by Ronnie Hudson and The Street People
- "Dance Floor" performed by Zapp

I Ain't Mad at Cha

- "A Dream" performed by DeBarge

What'z Ya Phone #

- "777-9311" performed by The Time

Can't C Me

- "(Not Just) Knee Deep" performed by Funkadelic
- "I'm Only Out for One Thang" performed by Ice Cube
- "Get Off My Dick and Tell Yo Bitch to Come Here" performed by Ice Cube
- "What's My Name" performed by Snoop Dogg
- "Shake, Rattle and Roll" performed by Big Joe Turner

Shorty Wanna Be a Thug

- "Wildflower" performed by Hank Crawford

When We Ride

- "What Would You Do" performed by Tha Dogg Pound

Thug Passion

- "Computer Love" performed by Zapp & Roger

Picture Me Rollin'

- "Winter Sadness" performed by Kool & the Gang
- "Better Off" performed by Johnny "J"

Check Out Time

- "Candy Rain" performed by Soul for Real
- "Just Don't Bite It" performed by N.W.A

Ratha Be Ya Nigga

- "I'd Rather Be with You" performed by Bootsy Collins

All Eyez on Me

- "Never Gonna Stop" performed by Linda Clifford

Run tha Streetz

- "Piece of My Love" performed by Guy

Wonda Why They Call U Bytch

- "50 Ways to Leave Your Lover" by Paul Simon

Heaven Ain't Hard 2 Find

- "What You Won't Do for Love" performed by Bobby Caldwell

== Personnel ==
Credits for All Eyez on Me adapted from AllMusic and CD booklet.

- 2Pac – associate producer, composer, producer, vocals
- Suge Knight – executive producer
- Norris Anderson – production manager
- Delmar "Daz" Arnaud – composer
- Dave Aron – engineer, mixing
- Big Syke – vocals
- Larry Blackmon – composer
- David Blake – composer, mixing, producer, talk box
- B-Legit – vocals
- Bobcat – composer
- Calvin Broadus – composer
- R. Brown – composer
- C-BO – vocals
- Larry Chatman – associate producer
- Rick Clifford – engineer
- G. Clinton Jr. – composer
- George Clinton – composer, vocals
- Nanci Fletcher – vocals
- Dorothy Coleman – background vocals
- W. Collins – composer
- Kenn Cox – composer
- CPO – vocals
- Woody Cunningham – composer
- Tommy D. Daugherty – engineer
- Danny Boy – vocals
- Dat Nigga Daz – producer, vocals
- Robert Diggs – composer
- DJ Pooh – composer, mixing, producer
- Dr. Dre – composer, mixing, producer, vocals
- Tha Dogg Pound – vocals
- Nate Dogg – vocals
- Dramacydal – vocals
- Dru Down – vocals
- Norman Durham – composer
- E-40 – vocals
- Ebony – background vocals
- Bobby Ervin – composer, producer
- Fatal – vocals
- Brian Gardner – mastering
- Michael Geiser – associate engineer
- Yaki Kadafi – vocals
- Nathaniel Hale – composer
- C. Haskins – composer
- Johnny Jackson – composer
- Jewell – vocals
- Johnny "J" – mixing, producer
- Puff Johnson – background vocals
- Jojo the Elf – vocals
- E. Jordan – composer
- Kurupt – vocals
- Alvin McGill – associate engineer, engineer
- Method Man – vocals
- Michel'le – vocals
- Mike Mosley – assistant engineer, composer, mixing, producer
- Nanci Fletcher – vocals
- Shirley Murdock – composer
- Ken Nahoum – photography
- Outlawz – vocals
- J.P. Pennington – composer
- Prince – composer
- George Pryce – art direction, design
- QD3 – composer
- Rappin' 4-Tay – vocals
- Doug Rasheed – composer, producer
- Danny Ray – background vocals
- Redman – vocals
- Richie Rich – vocals
- Rick Rock – producer
- Patrick Shevelin – associate engineer
- Carl "Butch" Small – percussion
- Stacey Smallie – background vocals
- C. Smith – composer
- Henry "Hendogg" Smith – illustrations
- Snoop Doggy Dogg – vocals
- Troy Staton – engineer
- D. Stevens – composer
- E. Stevens – composer
- D. Stewart – composer
- The Storm – vocals
- DeVanté Swing – composer, mixing, producer
- Roy Tesfay – production co-ordination
- Rahiem Prince Thomas – composer
- S. Thomas – composer
- Sean "Barney" Thomas – keyboards
- Larry Troutman – composer
- Roger Troutman – composer, vocals, talk box
- Natasha Walker – background vocals
- Carlos Warlick – engineer, mixing
- Barbara Warren – stylist, unknown contributor role
- Bruce Washington – composer
- Danette Williams – background vocals
- Barbara Wilson – background vocals
- Nanci Fletcher – background vocals
- Keston Wright – engineer

== Charts ==
=== Weekly charts ===
Chart (1996)	Peak position
Australian Albums (ARIA)	19
Belgian Albums (Ultratop Flanders)	44
Belgian Albums (Ultratop Wallonia)	34
Canada Top Albums/CDs (RPM)	11
Dutch Albums (Album Top 100)	11
German Albums (Offizielle Top 100)	16
New Zealand Albums (RMNZ)	15
Norwegian Albums (VG-lista)	34
Swedish Albums (Sverigetopplistan)	5
Swiss Albums (Schweizer Hitparade)	15
UK Albums (Official Charts)	32
UK R&B Albums (Official Charts)	6
US Billboard 200	1
US Top R&B/Hip-Hop Albums (Billboard)	1

Chart (2002)	Peak position
UK Albums (Official Charts)	65

Chart (2003)	Peak position
French Albums (SNEP)	99
Irish Albums Chart	62
UK Albums (Official Charts)	74

Chart (2012)	Peak position
US Catalog Albums (Billboard)	9

Chart (2017)	Peak position
US Vinyl Albums (Billboard)	4

Chart (2018)	Peak position
US Billboard 200	192

=== Year-end charts ===
Chart (1996)	Position
German Albums (Offizielle Top 100)	66
US Billboard 200	3
US Top R&B/Hip-Hop Albums (Billboard)	3

Chart (1997)	Position
US Billboard 200	85
US Top R&B/Hip-Hop Albums (Billboard)	8

Chart (2002)	Position
Canadian R&B Albums (Nielsen SoundScan)	178
Canadian Rap Albums (Nielsen SoundScan)	89

=== Decade-end charts ===
Chart (1990–1999)	Position
US Billboard 200	97

== Certifications ==
Region	Certification	Certified units/sales
Australia (ARIA)	Gold	35,000^{^}
Canada (Music Canada)	Platinum	100,000^{^}
Denmark (IFPI Danmark)	2× Platinum	40,000^{‡}
Italy (FIMI)	Gold	25,000^{‡}
Netherlands (NVPI)	Platinum	37,200^{‡}
New Zealand (RMNZ)	3× Platinum	45,000^{‡}
United Kingdom (BPI)	Platinum	300,000^{^}
United States (RIAA)	Diamond	5,887,630
^{^} Shipments figures based on certification alone.^{‡} Sales+streaming figures based on certification alone.

== See also ==
- Tupac Shakur discography
- List of number-one albums of 1996 (U.S.)
- List of number-one R&B albums of 1996 (U.S.)
- List of best-selling albums in the United States
