= Ambitionz az a Ridah =

1996 song by 2Pac

Song by 2Pac

from the album All Eyez on Me
- Released: February 13, 1996
- Recorded: October 13, 1995
- Genre: Gangsta rap
- Length: 4:38
- Label: Death Row; Interscope
- Songwriters: Tupac Shakur; Delmar Arnaud
- Producer: Dat Nigga Daz

"Ambitionz az a Ridah" is a song by American rapper 2Pac from his fourth studio album All Eyez on Me (1996). Produced by Dat Nigga Daz, the song samples "Pee-Wee's Dance" by Joeski Love.

== Background ==
2Pac wrote the lyrics to the song while in prison for sexual abuse charges in 1995. After being released from prison, he recorded the song at Can-Am Studios in Tarzana, Los Angeles on October 13, 1995. In a 2015 interview with XXL, Kurupt stated that 2Pac recorded the first verse in 45 minutes. Daz Dillinger also spoke about producing the song in the same interview: "The idea came from the me sampling Pee-wee Herman. So if you listen to Pee-wee Herman, I just put the gangsta twist on it. I gave it to 'Pac. Came back to the studio, and it was done."

== Content ==
The lyrics revolve around 2Pac's readiness to face challenges and obstacles in his life, and seeking revenge on the people who wronged him. He mentions boxer Mike Tyson, and also addresses his shooting in 1994 and sexual abuse conviction. The song also contains a sample of ring announcer Michael Buffer saying his catchphrase "Let's get ready to rumble!"

== Alternate version ==
Tupac also recorded an alternate version called "Ambitionz az a Fighta" for friend Mike Tyson's 1995 comeback fight against Buster Mathis Jr. This version features different lyrics, revolving around Tyson's own struggle with being imprisoned for rape in 1992 and his journey to regain the heavyweight championship after being paroled.

== Critical reception ==
Roger Morton of NME cited "Ambitionz az a Ridah" as one of the songs from All Eyez on Me which he described as "superbly unsettling, unprecedented renderings of the fear-soaked, hardcore-G mentality."

== Certifications ==
Region	Certification	Certified units/sales
Denmark (IFPI Danmark)	Platinum	90,000^{‡}
Germany (BVMI)	Gold	250,000^{‡}
Italy (FIMI)	Gold	50,000^{‡}
New Zealand (RMNZ)	4× Platinum	120,000^{‡}
United Kingdom (BPI)	Platinum	600,000^{‡}
^{‡} Sales+streaming figures based on certification alone.
