= 2 of Amerikaz Most Wanted =

1996 single by 2Pac featuring Snoop Doggy Dogg

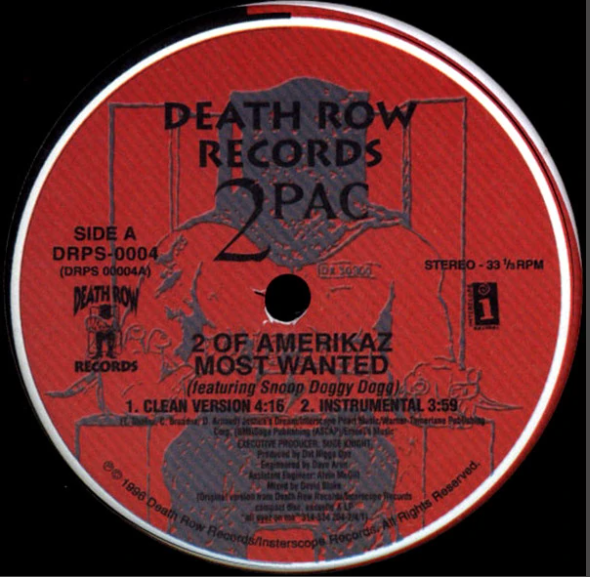

Promotional single by 2Pac featuring Snoop Doggy Dogg

from the album All Eyez on Me
- Released: May 7, 1996
- Recorded: October 13–15, 1995
- Studio: Can-Am Studios (Tarzana, Los Angeles)
- Length: 4:05 (album version); 5:31 (music video)
- Label: Death Row; Interscope
- Songwriters: Tupac Shakur; Calvin Broadus; Delmar Arnaud
- Producer: Dat Nigga Daz

"2 of Amerikaz Most Wanted" is a song by the American rapper 2Pac from his fourth album, All Eyez on Me (1996). The song features Snoop Doggy Dogg and was produced by Dat Nigga Daz. It was released as a promotional single for the album on May 7, 1996, and then as the B-side to the album's second major and third overall single, "How Do U Want It". The song peaked at number 46 on the US Billboard Hot R&B/Hip-Hop Airplay chart. The song contains interpolations of Grandmaster Flash and The Furious Five's song "The Message" and "Radio Activity Rap (Let's Jam)" by MC Frosty and Lovin' C.

Although the song was limited to a promo release, a music video was filmed for it. The version of the song used for the music video differs from the version on the album, with clean alternative lyrics, delay on the word "Party" within the chorus, and an arpeggio added to the beat.

== Music video ==
The music video was directed by one of Shakur's production partners, Gobi M. Rahimi. The music video was released on April 28, 1996. The prelude for the song shows a parody of Biggie Smalls named "Piggy", and of Puff Daddy, in discussion with Shakur about the November 1994 shooting at Quad Studios. It features cameos by Tha Dogg Pound and Nate Dogg.

== Live performances ==
The song was the last one performed in their House of Blues concert on July 4, 1996, Shakur's last recorded performance. The performance was featured on the 2005 Live at the House of Blues live album.

This song was performed by Dr. Dre and Snoop Dogg as a tribute to Shakur during the 2000 Up In Smoke Tour. The performance included a sample of Shakur's verse.

On April 15, 2012, the song was performed at the Coachella Festival with Snoop Dogg rapping with a transparent Pepper's ghost image of Shakur.

== Appearances ==
The song was included on numerous 2Pac compilations, including his Greatest Hits and Best of: Thug album.

The song was featured in the first episode of the TV series Gang Related.

The song was played on Shakur's biopic, All Eyez On Me (2017) with 2Pac and Snoop in the studio recording the song.

== Credits and personnel ==
- 2Pac – vocals, lyricist
- Snoop Doggy Dogg – vocals, lyricist
- Dat Nigga Daz – producer, composer, programmer
- Dave Aron – recording engineer
- Alvin McGill – assistant recording engineer
- DJ Quik – mixing engineer
- Brian "Big Bass" Gardner – mastering engineer

== Charts ==
Chart (1996)	Peak position
US Billboard Hot 100 (Hot R&B/Hip-Hop Airplay)	46

== Certifications ==
Certifications for "2 of Amerikaz Most Wanted"
Region	Certification	Certified units/sales
New Zealand (RMNZ)	2× Platinum	60,000^{‡}
United Kingdom (BPI)	Silver	200,000^{‡}
^{‡} Sales+streaming figures based on certification alone.
