= How Do U Want It =

1996 single by 2Pac featuring K-Ci & JoJo

Single by 2Pac featuring K-Ci & JoJo

from the album All Eyez on Me
- A-side: "California Love"
- B-side: "2 of Amerikaz Most Wanted"; "Hit 'Em Up"
- Released: May 28, 1996
- Studio: Can-Am (Tarzana, Los Angeles)
- Genre: Hip-hop; R&B; G-funk
- Length: 4:47 (album version); 3:59 (radio edit)
- Label: Death Row; Interscope
- Songwriters: Tupac Shakur; Johnny Jackson
- Producer: Johnny "J"

2Pac singles chronology
"California Love" (1995)	"How Do U Want It" (1996)	"I Ain't Mad at Cha" (1996)

K-Ci & JoJo singles chronology
"If You Think You're Lonely Now" (1994)	"How Do U Want It" (1996)	"How Could You" (1996)

Music video
- "How Do U Want It" on YouTube

"How Do U Want It" is a song by American rapper 2Pac from his fourth studio album, All Eyez on Me (1996). It was released on May 28, 1996, by Death Row and Interscope Records, and was his final single to be released during his lifetime. "How Do U Want It" features R&B duo K-Ci & JoJo, who at the time were best known as the lead singers of the R&B quartet Jodeci. The song received a Best Rap Performance by a Duo or Group Grammy nomination in 1997. It would also top the Billboard Year-End Hot Rap Singles of 1996, becoming 2Pac's only single to accomplish that feat.

Produced by Johnny "J", "How Do U Want It" samples Quincy Jones' 1974 song "Body Heat", and includes a diss towards civil rights activist and fierce rap critic C. Delores Tucker. Tucker later sued 2Pac's estate, claiming that comments in this song, and on the track "Wonda Why They Call U Bitch" from the same album, inflicted emotional distress, were slanderous, and invaded her privacy. The case was later dismissed. A music video was created for "How Do U Want It" and its B-sides "2 of Amerikaz Most Wanted" and "Hit 'Em Up".

== Commercial performance ==
In the United States, the song was issued as a double A-sided single with "California Love", also from All Eyez on Me. The single reached number one on the US Billboard Hot 100, becoming Death Row Records' first and only chart-topping single, while "How Do U Want It" by itself reached number two on the New Zealand Singles Chart. On the US Hot 100, sales were the biggest driver of the single's chart run, spending four weeks on top of the component chart for sales while barely entering the top-75 airplay component chart at number 68.

== Music videos ==
There were three videos filmed for this song:

A dirty version and a clean version were both directed by Ron Hightower and produced by Tracy D. Robinson. These two versions are distinguished by music ratings (one is certified adult material). The videos portray a wild sex party with Jacuzzi, mechanical bull riding, cage dancing and pole stripping. The dirty version also features numerous porn stars, including Nina Hartley, Heather Hunter, Nadia Cassini and Angel Kelly.

The third version, known as the concert version, is mostly live on stage (not from the House of Blues live performance). There are cameo appearances by K-Ci & JoJo, and fellow group member of Digital Underground Shock G both in the concert and studio segments.

== Track listing ==
A1. "How Do U Want It" (LP version)
A2. "California Love" (long radio edit)
B1. "2 of Amerikaz Most Wanted" (LP version)
B2. "Hit 'Em Up"

== Charts ==
=== Weekly charts ===
Weekly chart performance for "How Do U Want It"
Chart (1996)	Peak position
Australia (ARIA)	24
Canada (Nielsen SoundScan)	11
Europe (Eurochart Hot 100)	60
Europe (European Dance Radio)	17
Finland (Suomen virallinen lista)	19
France (SNEP)	35
Germany (GfK)	74
Italy (Musica e dischi)	10
New Zealand (Recorded Music NZ)	2
Sweden (Sverigetopplistan)	33
Switzerland (Schweizer Hitparade)	37
Scottish Singles Sales (Official Charts)	53
UK Singles (Official Charts)	17
UK Dance (Official Charts)	8
UK Hip Hop/R&B (Official Charts)	3
US Billboard Hot 100 with "California Love"	1
US Dance Singles Sales (Billboard) with "California Love"	1
US Hot R&B/Hip-Hop Songs (Billboard) with "California Love"	1
US Hot Rap Songs (Billboard) with "California Love"	1
US Rhythmic Airplay (Billboard)	23

=== Year-end charts ===
Year-end chart performance for "How Do U Want It"
Chart (1996)	Position
New Zealand (RIANZ)	13
US Billboard Hot 100	17
US Hot R&B Singles (Billboard)	6
US Hot Rap Singles (Billboard)	1
US Maxi-Singles Sales (Billboard)	1

== Certifications ==
Certifications and sales for "How Do U Want It"
Region	Certification	Certified units/sales
Australia (ARIA)	Gold	35,000^{^}
New Zealand (RMNZ)	2× Platinum	60,000^{‡}
United Kingdom (BPI)	Silver	200,000^{‡}
United States (RIAA)	2× Platinum	1,700,000
^{^} Shipments figures based on certification alone.^{‡} Sales+streaming figures based on certification alone.

== Release history ==
Release dates and formats for "How Do U Want It"
Region	Date	Format(s)	Label(s)	Ref.
United States	May 28, 1996	Rhythmic contemporary radio	Death Row; Interscope	
United Kingdom	July 15, 1996	12-inch vinyl; CD; cassette	Death Row; Interscope	

== See also ==
- Hot 100 number-one hits of 1996 (USA)
