= List of songs recorded by Tupac Shakur =

Songs by American rapper

The following is a list of recorded songs by American rapper Tupac Shakur.

| Song | Year | Album | Other Performer(s) | Producer(s) | Ref. |
|---|---|---|---|---|---|
| "Against All Odds" | 1996 | The Don Killuminati: The 7 Day Theory | —N/a | Hurt-M-Badd, Makaveli | |
| "Against All Odds" | 2007 | Life Goes On | Trae | Q-Stone | |
| "Ain't Hard 2 Find" | 1996 | All Eyez on Me | E-40, B-Legit, C-Bo, Richie Rich | Mike Mosley, Rick Rock, Cassius Roman, Tikhon Shepelev, Tyler Metzger | |
| "All Bout U" | 1996 | All Eyez on Me | Dru Down, Hussein Fatal, Yaki Kadafi, Nate Dogg, Snoop Doggy Dogg | Johnny "J", 2Pac, Cassius Roman | |
| "All Bout U (Remix)" | 1998 | Greatest Hits | Dru Down, Hussein Fatal, Yaki Kadafi, Nate Dogg, Top Dogg | Johnny "J", 2Pac, Cassius Roman | |
| "All By Myself" | 2012 | World Cry | Jah Cure | | |
| "All Eyez on Me" | 1996 | All Eyez on Me | Big Syke | Johnny "J" Cassius Roman | |
| "All Eyez on Me" (Nu-Mixx) | 2003 | Nu-Mixx Klazzics | Big Syke | | |
| "All In" | 2011 | —N/a | Knoc-turn'al | | |
| "All Out" | 2001 | Until the End of Time | Outlawz | Big Simon Says | |
| "Ambitionz az a Ridah" | 1996 | All Eyez on Me | —N/a | Dat Nigga Daz | |
| "Ambitionz az a Ridah (Nu-Mixx)" | 2003 | Nu-Mixx Klazzics | —N/a | Cassius Roman | |
| "American Gangsta" | 2010 | Outkasted Outlawz | Nutt-So, Hussein Fatal | Cassius Roman | |
| "Are U Still Down" | 1997 | Cool Relax | Jon B. | 2Pac, Johnny "J" | |
| "Army All By Myself" | 2009 | Bullets Ain't Go No Names Vol. 3 | Nipsey Hussle, Jay Rock, June Summers | | |
| "As the World Turns" | 1999 | Still I Rise | Big D, Young Noble, Napoleon, E.D.I. Mean, Yaki Kadafi, | Big D | |
| "Baby Don't Cry (Keep Ya Head Up II)" | 1999 | Still I Rise | E.D.I. Mean, Young Noble | 2Pac, Soulshock & Karlin | |
| "Ballad of a Dead Soulja" | 2001 | Until the End of Time | K-Ci & JoJo | Cold 187um | |
| "Be the Realist" | 1997 | Stop the Gunfight | Trapp, The Notorious B.I.G. | | |
| "Better Dayz" | 2002 | Better Dayz | Ron Isley | Johnny "J" | |
| "Big Bad Lady" | 1997 | Necessary Roughness | The Lady of Rage, Kevin Vernando | Daz Dillinger | |
| "Black Cotton" | 2004 | Loyal to the Game | Kastro, Young Noble, Eminem | Eminem, Luis Resto, (co.) | |
| "Black Jesuz" | 1999 | Still I Rise | Yaki Kadafi, Storm, Val Young, Young Noble, Kastro | 2Pac, L Rock Ya | |
| "Black Starry Night" | 1997 | R U Still Down? (Remember Me) | —N/a | DJ Daryl | |
| "Blasphemy" | 1996 | The Don Killuminati: The 7 Day Theory | —N/a | Hurt-M-Badd | |
| "Bomb First (My Second Reply)" | 1996 | The Don Killuminati: The 7 Day Theory | E.D.I. Mean, Young Noble | Makaveli, Big D | |
| "Breathin'" | 2001 | Until the End of Time | Outlawz | Johnny "J" | |
| "Brenda's Got a Baby" | 1991 | 2Pacalypse Now | Dave Hollister | The Underground Railroad | |
| "Bury Me a G" | 1994 | Thug Life: Volume 1 | Mopreme Shakur, Rated R, Big Syke, Macadoshis, Natasha Walker | Thug Music | |
| "California" (Remix) | 2003 | —N/a | Sly Boogy, Mack 10, Jayo Felony, E-40, Kurupt, Crooked I, Roscoe (Background vocals: Nanci Fletcher, Barbara Wilson, Danette Williams) | | |
| "California Love" | 1998 | Greatest Hits | Dr. Dre, Roger Troutman (Background vocals: Barbara Wilson, Danette Williams, Dorothy Coleman) | Dr. Dre | |
| "California Love" (Remix) | 1996 | All Eyez on Me | Dr. Dre, Roger Troutman (Background vocals: Nanci Fletcher, Barbara Wilson, Danette Williams) | Dr. Dre | |
| "California Love" (Short Radio Edit) | 1996 | —N/a | Dr. Dre, Roger Troutman, (Background vocals: Barbara Wilson, Danette Williams, Dorothy Coleman) | Dr. Dre | |
| "Call It What U Want" | 1992 | Black Mafia Life | Above the Law, Money B | Above the Law | |
| "Can U Get Away" | 1995 | Me Against the World | —N/a | Mike Mosley | |
| "Can't C Me" | 1996 | All Eyez on Me | George Clinton, Dr. Dre, Nanci Fletcher | Dr. Dre | |
| "The Case of the Misplaced Mic" | 2007 | Beginnings: The Lost Tapes 1988-1991 | DJ Dizzy | Chopmaster J | |
| "The Case of the Misplaced Mic, Pt. 2" | 2007 | Beginnings: The Lost Tapes 1988-1991 | DJ Dizzy | Chopmaster J | |
| "Catchin' Feelins" | 2002 | Better Dayz | Outlawz | E.D.I. Mean | |
| "Change My Ways" | 2004 | Welcome to the Hood | Young Buck | | |
| "Changed Man" | 2002 | Better Dayz | Johnta Austin, T.I., Jazze Pha | Jazze Pha | |
| "Changes" | 1998 | Greatest Hits | Talent | Big D the Impossible | |
| "Check Out Time" | 1996 | All Eyez on Me | Kurupt, Big Syke, Natasha Walker | Johnny "J", 2Pac | |
| "Comin' Real Again" | 1993 | The New Breed | MC Breed | Colin Wolfe | |
| "Cradle to the Grave" | 1994 | Thug Life: Volume 1 | Mopreme Shakur, Rated R, Big Syke, Macadoshis | Big Syke, Jay | |
| "Crooked Ass Nigga" | 1991 | 2Pacalypse Now | Stretch | Stretch | |
| "Crooked Nigga Too" | 2004 | Loyal to the Game | —N/a | Eminem, Luis Resto, (co.) | |
| "Crooked Nigga Too" (Raphael Saadiq Remix) | 2004 | Loyal to the Game | Raphael Saadiq | Raphael Saadiq | |
| "A Day In the Life" | 2007 | Beginnings: The Lost Tapes 1988-1991 | Strictly Dope | Chopmaster J | |
| "Deadly Combination" | 2000 | The Big Picture | Big L | Ron G | |
| "Deadly Combination (Remix)" | 2006 | Big L: The Archives 1996–2000 | Big L, The Notorious B.I.G. | Ron G | |
| "Dear Mama" | 1995 | Me Against the World | —N/a | Tony Pizarro | |
| "Dear Mama" (Remix) | 2006 | Pac's Life (UK Edition) | Anthony Hamilton | Frank Nitty | |
| "Death Around the Corner" | 1995 | Me Against the World | —N/a | Johnny "J" | |
| "Definition of a Thug Nigga" | 1997 | R U Still Down? (Remember Me) | —N/a | Warren G | |
| "Do for Love" | 1997 | R U Still Down? (Remember Me) | Eric Williams | Soulshock & Karlin | |
| "Don't Sleep" | 2006 | Pac's Life | Nutt-So, Yaki Kadafi, Lil' Scrappy, Stormey | E.D.I. Mean | |
| "Don't Stop" | 2001 | 2002 | Tha Dogg Pound | Daz Dillinger | |
| "Don't Stop The Music" | 2006 | Pac's Life | Outlaw Immortalz, Nanci Fletcher, Stormey | L.T. Hutton | |
| "Don't You Trust Me?" | 2004 | Loyal to the Game | —N/a | Eminem, Luis Resto, (co.) | |
| "Dopefiend's Diners" | 2007 | Best of 2Pac: Life | —N/a | Big D the Impossible | |
| "Dumpin'" | 2006 | Pac's Life | Carl Thomas, Hussein Fatal, Papoose | Sha Money XL | |
| "Dusted N Disgusted" | 1995 | In a Major Way | E-40, Spice 1, Mac Mall | Mike Mosley | |
| "Enemies With me" | 1997 | R U Still Down? (Remember Me) | Dramacydal | We Got Kidz | |
| "Everything They Owe" | 2001 | Until the End of Time | Timothy | Johnny "J" | |
| "Fair Xchange" | 2002 | Better Dayz | Jazze Pha | Jazze Pha | |
| "Fair Xchange" (Remix) | 2002 | Better Dayz | Mýa | Troy Johnson | |
| "Fake Ass Bitches" | 1997 | R U Still Down? (Remember Me) | —N/a | Johnny "J" | |
| "Fame" | 2002 | Better Dayz | —N/a | Hurt-M-Badd | |
| "First 2 Bomb (Remix)" | 2004 | Son Rize Vol. 1 | Yaki Kadafi, Fatalveli | | |
| "Friends" | 2000 | Too Gangsta for Radio | —N/a | | |
| "Fuck All Y'all" | 1997 | R U Still Down? (Remember Me) | —N/a | We Got Kidz | |
| "Fuck Em All" | 2002 | Better Dayz | Outlawz | Johnny "J" | |
| "Fuck Friendz" | 2001 | Until the End of Time | Tiffany Villarreal | QDIII | |
| "Fuck the World" | 1995 | Me Against the World | Shock-G | Shock G | |
| "Fuckin wit the Wrong Nigga" | 2001 | Until the End of Time | —N/a | Hurt-M-Badd | |
| "Gaffled" (Remix) | 1999 | Immortalized | 3X Krazy, Eklipze, B.N.T. | | |
| "Gaffled Like That" | 1992 | Govenor's Taxin' | The Govenor, Richie Rich | | |
| "Gangsta Team" | 1994 | 'N Gatz We Truss | South Central Cartel, MC Eiht, Ice-T, Spice 1 | | |
| "Get Worried" | 2004 | Son Rize Vol. 1 | Yaki Kadafi | | |
| "Ghetto Gospel" | 2004 | Loyal to the Game | —N/a | Eminem, Luis Resto, (co.) | |
| "Ghetto Star" | 2002 | Better Dayz | Nutt-So | Go-Twice | |
| "Ghost" | 2003 | Tupac: Resurrection | —N/a | Eminem | |
| "God Bless the Dead" | 1998 | Greatest Hits | —N/a | | |
| "The Good Die Young" | 1999 | Still I Rise | Val Young, Napoleon, Young Noble, Kastro, E.D.I. Mean | Big D | |
| "Good Life" | 2001 | Until the End of Time | Big Syke, E.D.I. Mean | Mike Mosley | |
| "Got My Mind Made Up" | 1996 | All Eyez on Me | Tha Dogg Pound, Method Man, Redman | Dat Nigga Daz | |
| "Got My Mind Made Up" (Nu-Mixx) | 2007 | Evolution: Duets and Remixes | Outlawz, Kurupt | Street Radio, Bob Perry, Arnold Mischkulnig | |
| "Got 2 Survive" | 1996 | Black n Dangerous | Young Lay, Ray Luv, Mac Mall | | |
| "Gotta Get Mine" | 1993 | The New Breed | MC Breed | Colin Wolfe | |
| "Gotta Get Mine" (Remix) | 1999 | It's All Good | MC Breed | Ricco Lumpkins | |
| "Guess Who's Back" | 1993 | Strictly 4 My Niggaz | —N/a | Special Ed | |
| "Hail Mary" | 1996 | The Don Killuminati: The 7 Day Theory | The Outlawz | Hurt-M-Badd | |
| "Hail Mary" (Nu-Mixx) | 2003 | Nu-Mixx Klazzics | Outlawz | | |
| "Hail Mary" (Rock Remix) | 2007 | Evolution: Duets and Remixes | Outlawz | Ill Will Fulton | |
| "Happy Home" | 2001 | Until the End of Time | Yusef Sharid, Barbara Wilson, Tracy Hardin | JIM GITTUM, Daren Vegas, Crooked I | |
| "Have Heart, Have Money" | 2007 | Black & Brown Pride | Mopreme Shakur, Macadoshis, Big Syke, Taje | | |
| "Heartz of Men" | 1996 | All Eyez on Me | —N/a | DJ Quik | |
| "Heartz of Men" (Nu-Mixx) | 2003 | Nu-Mixx Klazzics | —N/a | | |
| "Heaven Ain't Hard 2 Find" | 1996 | All Eyez on Me | —N/a | QD3 | |
| "Heavy In the Game" | 1995 | Me Against the World | Richie Rich, Lady Levi, Ebony Foster | Sam Bostic, Mike Mosley | |
| "Hell 4 a Hustler" | 1999 | Still I Rise | E.D.I. Mean, Young Noble | Damon Thomas | |
| "Hellrazor" | 1997 | R U Still Down? (Remember Me) | Stretch, Val Young | QDIII | |
| "Hennessey" | 2004 | Loyal to the Game | Obie Trice | Eminem, Luis Resto, (co.) | |
| "Hennessey" (Red Spyda Remix) | 2004 | Loyal to the Game | E.D.I. Mean, Sleepy Brown | Red Spyda | |
| "High Speed" | 1999 | Still I Rise | Yaki Kadafi, E.D.I. Mean | Big D | |
| "Hip Hop" (Inspiration Remix) | 2004 | —N/a | Royce da 5'9", Big Pun, Big L, The Notorious B.I.G. | | |
| "Hit 'Em Up" | 1998 | Greatest Hits | Outlawz | Johnny "J" | |
| "Hit 'Em Up" (Nu-Mixx) | 2003 | Nu-Mixx Klazzics | Outlawz | | |
| "Hit 'Em Up" | 2013 | —N/a | Tyga, Jadakiss | DJ Mustard | |
| "Hold On Be Strong" | 1997 | R U Still Down? (Remember Me) | Stretch | Choo | |
| "Hold Ya Head" | 1996 | The Don Killuminati: The 7 Day Theory | Tyrone Wrice | Hurt-M-Badd | |
| "Holla At Me" | 1996 | All Eyez on Me | Nanci Fletcher | Bobcat | |
| "Holler If Ya Hear Me" | 1993 | Strictly 4 My Niggaz | —N/a | Stretch | |
| "Home Late" | 2004 | Son Rize Vol. 1 | Yaki Kadafi | | |
| "Homeboyz" | 1999 | Still I Rise | Young Noble | Daz Dillinger | |
| "Homies & Thuggs" | 1998 | My Homies | Scarface, Master P | N.O. Joe, Mike Dean | |
| "Homies & Thuggs" (Remix) | 1998 | My Homies | Scarface, Master P, Doracell | Scarface | |
| "How Do U Want It" | 1996 | All Eyez on Me | K-Ci & JoJo | Johnny "J" | |
| "How Do U Want It" (Nu-Mixx) | 2007 | Evolution: Duets and Remixes | —N/a | E.D.I. Mean | |
| "How Do U Want It" (Remix) | 2003 | Nu-Mixx Klazzics | K-Ci & JoJo | | |
| "How Long Will They Mourn Me?" | 1994 | Thug Life: Volume 1 | Rated R, Big Syke, Macadoshis, Nate Dogg | Nate Dogg, Warren G | |
| "I Ain't Mad at Cha" | 1996 | All Eyez on Me | Danny Boy | Dat Nigga Daz | |
| "I C Dead People" | 2004 | Ill At Will Mixtape, Vol. 1 | Redman, Big L, Big Pun, The Notorious B.I.G. | | |
| "I Don't Give a Fuck" | 1991 | 2Pacalypse Now | Pogo | Pee-Wee | |
| "I Get Around" | 1993 | Strictly 4 My Niggaz | Shock G, Money B | The D-Flow Production Squad | |
| "I Wonder If Heaven Got a Ghetto" | 1997 | R U Still Down? (Remember Me) | —N/a | Soulshock & Karlin | |
| "I Wonder If Heaven Got a Ghetto (Hip Hop Version)" | 1997 | R U Still Down? (Remember Me) | Maxee | Soulshock & Karlin | |
| "I'm Gettin' Money" | 1997 | R U Still Down? (Remember Me) | —N/a | Mike Mosley | |
| "I'm Losin' It" | 1997 | R U Still Down? (Remember Me) | Big Syke, Spice 1 | Tony Pizarro | |
| "If I Die 2Nite" | 1995 | Me Against the World | —N/a | Easy Mo Bee | |
| "If My Homie Calls" | 1991 | 2Pacalypse Now | —N/a | Big D the Impossible | |
| "If There's a Cure (I Don't Want It)" | 1996 | One Nation | Snoop Dogg | Johnny "J" | |
| "Initiated" | 1998 | Retaliation, Revenge and Get Back | Daz Dillinger, Kurupt, Outlawz | Daz Dillinger | |
| "Initiated" (Remix) | 2007 | Evolution: Duets and Remixes | Boot Camp Clik | Street Radio | |
| "Initiated" (Nu-Mixx) | 2007 | Evolution: Duets and Remixes | Boot Camp Clik | Jake One | |
| "International" | 2006 | Pac's Life | Nipsey Hussle, Young Dre the Truth | L.T. Hutton | |
| "It Ain't Easy" | 1995 | Me Against the World | —N/a | Tony Pizarro | |
| "Jawz Tight (OG Cypher)" | 2004 | Son Rize Vol. 1 | Yaki Kadafi, Outlawz, Boot Camp Clik | | |
| "Jealous Got Me Strapped" | 1994 | AmeriKKKa's Nightmare | Spice 1 | Blackjack | |
| "Just Like Daddy" | 1996 | The Don Killuminati: The 7 Day Theory | The Outlawz | Hurt-M-Badd | |
| "Keep Goin'" (Nu-Mixx) | 2007 | Evolution: Duets and Remixes | Hussein Fatal | Street Radio | |
| "Keep Ya Head Up" | 1993 | Strictly 4 My Niggaz | Dave Hollister | DJ Daryl | |
| "Killing Fields" | 2004 | Son Rize Vol. 1 | Yaki Kadafi, Young Thugz | | |
| "Killuminati" | 1999 | Still I Rise | E.D.I. Mean, Yaki Kadafi, Kastro, Qierra Davis-Martin | Tony Pizarro | |
| "Krazy" | 1996 | The Don Killuminati: The 7 Day Theory | Bad Azz | Big D | |
| "Last Wordz" | 1993 | Strictly 4 My Niggaz | Ice Cube, Ice-T | Bobcat, JMJ | |
| "LastOnesLeft" | 2001 | Until the End of Time | Yaki Kadafi | Johnny "J" | |
| "Late Night" | 2002 | Better Dayz | Outlawz, DJ Quik | DJ Quik | |
| "Let Em Have It" | 2001 | Until the End of Time | SKG & Honey | L.T. Hutton | |
| "Let Em Have It" (Remix) | 2001 | Until the End of Time | Left Eye | L.T. Hutton | |
| "Let Knowledge Drop" | 2007 | Beginnings: The Lost Tapes 1988-1991 | Strictly Dope | Chopmaster J | |
| "Let Them Thangs Go" | 1997 | R U Still Down? (Remember Me) | —N/a | We Got Kidz | |
| "Let's Get It On" | 1993 | Let's Get It On: The Album | Eddie F, 2Pac, Heavy D, Grand Puba, Spunk Bigga | | |
| "Letter to the President" | 1999 | Still I Rise | E.D.I. Mean, C-Knight, Kastro, Big Syke, | QDIII | |
| "Letter 2 My Unborn" | 2001 | Until the End of Time | Anthem, Tena Jones | Trackmasters | |
| "Lie to Kick It" | 1997 | R U Still Down? (Remember Me) | Richie Rich | Warren G | |
| "Life Goes On" | 1996 | All Eyez on Me | Stacey Smallie, Nanci Fletcher | Johnny "J" | |
| "Life Goes On" (Nu-Mixx) | 2003 | Nu-Mixx Klazzics | Stacey Smallie, Nanci Fletcher | | |
| "Life Is a Traffic Jam" | 1997 | Gridlock'd: The Soundtrack | Eight Mile Road | | |
| "Life of an Outlaw" | 1996 | The Don Killuminati: The 7 Day Theory | The Outlawz | Makaveli, Big D | |
| "Life's So Hard" | 1997 | Gang Related: The Soundtrack | —N/a | | |
| "Lil Homies" | 2001 | Until the End of Time | —N/a | Johnny "J" | |
| "Live Freestyle" | 1999 | The Tunnel | The Notorious B.I.G. | | |
| "Living In Pain" | 2005 | Duets: The Final Chapter | 2Pac, Nas, Mary J. Blige | Just Blaze | |
| "Lord Knows" | 1995 | Me Against the World | Natasha Walker | Brian G | |
| "Lost Souls" | 1997 | Gang Related: The Soundtrack | Outlawz | | |
| "Lost Souls" (Remix) | 2007 | Evolution: Duets and Remixes | Daz Dillinger, M-1 | Street Radio, Bob Perry, Arnold Mischkulnig | |
| "Lost Souls" (Nu-Mixx) | 2007 | Evolution: Duets and Remixes | Outlawz | Street Radio, Bob Perry, Arnold Mischkulnig | |
| "Loyal to the Game" | 2004 | Loyal to the Game | G-Unit | Eminem, Luis Resto, (co.) | |
| "Loyal to the Game" (DJ Quik Remix) | 2004 | Loyal to the Game | Big Syke, DJ Quik | DJ Quik | |
| "Tha' Lunatic" | 1991 | 2Pacalypse Now | Stretch | Shock G | |
| "M.O.B." | 2001 | Until the End of Time | Outlawz, Thug Life | Ant Banks | |
| "Made Niggaz" | 1997 | Gang Related: The Soundtrack | Outlawz | | |
| "Mama's Just a Little Girl" | 2002 | Better Dayz | Kimma Hill | KP | |
| "Mass Murderin'" (Remix) | 1997 | Hitworks, Volume One | DJ King Assassin, Mischief, Rich G | | |
| "Me & My Homies" | 1998 | G-Funk Classics, Vol. 1 & 2 | Nate Dogg, Nanci Fletcher | Soopafly | |
| "Me Against the World" | 1995 | Me Against the World | Dramacydal, Puff Johnson | Soulshock & Karlin | |
| "Me and My Girlfriend" | 1996 | The Don Killuminati: The 7 Day Theory | —N/a | Makaveli, Big D, Hurt-M-Badd | |
| "Military Minds" | 2002 | Better Dayz | Cocoa Brovas, Buckshot | E.D.I. Mean | |
| "Million Dollar Spot" | 1996 | Tha Hall of Game | E-40, B-Legit | Mike Mosley, Rick Rock | |
| "Minnie the Moocher" | 2007 | Beginnings: The Lost Tapes 1988-1991 | Strictly Dope | Chopmaster J | |
| "Murder, Murder" | 1997 | Slim Shady EP | Eminem | DJ Rec | |
| "My Block" (Remix) | 2002 | Better Dayz | —N/a | Nitty | |
| "My Burnin' Heart" | 2007 | Beginnings: The Lost Tapes 1988-1991 | Strictly Dope | Chopmaster J | |
| "My Closest Roaddogz" | 2001 | Until the End of Time | Shiro, Timothy | Johnny "J" | |
| "My Homeboys (Back to Back)" | 2005 | Against the Grain | Kurupt, Eastwood | Mark Sparks | |
| "N.I.G.G.A. (Never Ignorant Getting Goals Accomplished)" | 2004 | Loyal to the Game | Jadakiss | Eminem, Luis Resto, (co.) | |
| "Never B Peace" | 2002 | Better Dayz | E.D.I. Mean, Kastro | Nitty | |
| "Never Be Beat" | 2007 | Beginnings: The Lost Tapes 1988-1991 | Strictly Dope | Chopmaster J | |
| "Never Call U Bitch Again" | 2002 | Better Dayz | Tyrese | Johnny "J" | |
| "Never Had a Friend Like Me" | 1997 | Gridlock'd: The Soundtrack | —N/a | | |
| "Never Had a Friend Like Me" (Nu-Mixx) | 2003 | Nu-Mixx Klazzics | —N/a | | |
| "Niggaz Done Changed" | 1996 | Seasoned Veteran | Richie Rich | Rick Rock | |
| "Niggaz Nature" (Remix) | 2001 | Until the End of Time | Lil' Mo | QDIII | |
| "No More Pain" | 1996 | All Eyez on Me | —N/a | DeVanté | |
| "Nothin' But Love" | 1997 | R U Still Down? (Remember Me) | Dave Hollister | 2Pac, DJ Daryl | |
| "Nothing to Lose" | 1997 | R U Still Down? (Remember Me) | Y?N-Vee | 2Pac, Live Squad | |
| "Old School" | 1995 | Me Against the World | —N/a | Soulshock | |
| "One Day at a Time (Em's Version)" | 2003 | Tupac: Resurrection | Eminem, Outlawz | Eminem | |
| "Only Fear of Death" | 1997 | R U Still Down? (Remember Me) | —N/a | Live Squad | |
| "Only God Can Judge Me" | 1996 | All Eyez on Me | Rappin' 4-Tay | Doug Rasheed, Harold Scrap Freddie | |
| "Open Fire" | 1997 | R U Still Down? (Remember Me) | Akshun | Akshun | |
| "Out On Bail" | 2004 | Loyal to the Game | —N/a | Eminem, Luis Resto, (co.) | |
| "Out the Moon (Boom, Boom, Boom)" | 1997 | Gridlock'd: The Soundtrack | Snoop Dogg, Soopafly, Techniec, Bad Azz, Tray-Dee | | |
| "Outlaw" | 1995 | Me Against the World | Dramacydal, Rah-Rah | Moe Z.M.D. | |
| "P.Y.T. (Playa Young Thugs)" | 1995 | Smooth | Smooth | Chris Stokes | |
| "Pac's Life" | 2006 | Pac's Life | Ashanti, T.I., L.T. Hutton | L.T. Hutton | |
| "Pac's Life" (Remix) | 2006 | Pac's Life | Chris Starr, Snoop Dogg, T.I., L.T. Hutton | L.T. Hutton | |
| "Pac's Theme" | 1993 | Strictly 4 My Niggaz | —N/a | The Underground Railroad | |
| "Pain" | 1994 | Regulate (single) | Stretch | Stretch | |
| "Pain" (Nu-Mixx) | 2007 | Evolution: Duets and Remixes | Styles P, Butch Cassidy | Black Jeruz | |
| "Pain" (Remix) | 2007 | Evolution: Duets and Remixes | Styles P, Butch Cassidy | Street Radio | |
| "Panther Power" | 2007 | Beginnings: The Lost Tapes 1988-1991 | Strictly Dope | Chopmaster J | |
| "Papa'z Song" | 1993 | Strictly 4 My Niggaz | Wycked, Poppi | Big D the Impossible | |
| "Part Time Mutha" | 1991 | 2Pacalypse Now | Angelique & Poppi | Big D the Impossible | |
| "Part 2" | 2004 | Stronger Everyday | Jon B | Johnny "J" | |
| "Pass the 40" | 1992 | Hollywood Records Sampler | Raw Fusion, Saafir, Bulldogg, D the Poet 151, Mac Mone, Stretch, Pee-Wee | | |
| "Peep Game" | 1993 | Strictly 4 My Niggaz | Deadly Threat | Bobcat | |
| "Picture Me Rollin'" | 1996 | All Eyez on Me | Danny Boy, Big Syke, CPO, | Johnny "J" | |
| "Picture Me Rollin'" (Alternate Remix) | 2007 | Evolution: Duets and Remixes | Outlawz | Claudio Cueni | |
| "Picture Me Rollin'" (Nu-Mixx) | 2007 | Evolution: Duets and Remixes | Kurupt, Butch Cassidy | Street Radio, Bob Perry, Arnold Mischkulnig | |
| "Playa Cardz Right" | 2008 | A Different Me | Keyshia Cole | Carvin & Ivan, Ron Fair | |
| "Playa Cardz Right (Female Version)" | 2006 | Pac's Life | Keyshia Cole | Karma Productions | |
| "Playa Cardz Right (Male Version)" | 2006 | Pac's Life | Ludacris, Keon Bryce | Sha Money XL | |
| "Playaz Dedication" | 1997 | 4 tha Hard Way | Rappin' 4-Tay | | |
| "Po' Nigga Blues" | 1995 | Floss Mode | The Govenor, The House of Reps | | |
| "Po' Nigga Blues" (Scott Storch Remix) | 2004 | Loyal to the Game | Ron Isley | Scott Storch | |
| "Point tha Finga" | 1993 | Strictly 4 My Niggaz | —N/a | Big D the Impossible | |
| "Pour Out a Little Liquor" | 1994 | Thug Life: Volume 1 | —N/a | Johnny "J" | |
| "R U Still Down? (Remember Me)" | 1997 | R U Still Down? (Remember Me) | —N/a | Tony Pizarro | |
| "Ratha Be Ya Nigga" | 1996 | All Eyez on Me | Richie Rich | Doug Rasheed | |
| "Ready 4 Whatever" | 1997 | R U Still Down? (Remember Me) | Big Syke | Johnny "J" | |
| "Real Bad Boyz (Westside)" | 1997 | Hitworks, Volume One | Dee tha Mad Bitch, DJ King Assassin | | |
| "The Realist Killaz" | 2003 | Tupac: Resurrection | 50 Cent | Red Spyda | |
| "Rebel of the Underground" | 1991 | 2Pacalypse Now | Ray Luv, Shock G | Shock G | |
| "Redemption" | 1997 | R U Still Down? (Remember Me) | —N/a | We Got Kidz, Ricky Rouse | |
| "Representin' 93" | 1993 | Strictly 4 My Niggaz | —N/a | Truman Jefferson | |
| "Resist the Temptation" | 2007 | Best of 2Pac: Thug | Amel Larrieux | Sha Money XL | |
| "Right Now" | 2010 | Trill OG | Bun B, Pimp C, Trey Songz | Steve Below | |
| "Run All Out" | 2004 | Son Rize Vol. 1 | Yaki Kadafi | | |
| "Run tha Streetz" | 1996 | All Eyez on Me | Michel'le, Mutah, Storm | Johnny "J", 2Pac | |
| "Runnin' from tha Police" | 1995 | One Million Strong | The Notorious B.I.G., Stretch, Dramacydal, Lil' Vicious | Easy Mo Bee | |
| "Runnin' (Dying to Live)" | 2003 | Tupac: Resurrection | The Notorious B.I.G. | Eminem | |
| "Runnin' On E" | 2001 | Until the End of Time | Outlawz | 2Pac | |
| "Same Song" | 1991 | This Is an EP Release / Nothing But Trouble soundtrack | | Shock G | |
| "Salsa Con Soulfood" | 1992 | Chicano Blues | Funky Aztecs | | |
| "Scared Straight" | 2006 | Pac's Life | —N/a | Karma Productions | |
| "Secretz of War" | 1999 | Still I Rise | E.D.I. Mean, Yaki Kadafi, Young Noble | Johnny "J" | |
| "Secretz Rearranged" | 2004 | Son Rize Vol. 1 | Yaki Kadafi, Hussein Fatal, Kastro | | |
| "Shit Don't Stop" | 1994 | Thug Life: Volume 1 | Mopreme Shakur, Rated R, Big Syke, Macadoshis, Y.N.V. | Thug Music | |
| "Shorty Wanna Be a Thug" | 1996 | All Eyez on Me | —N/a | Johnny "J" | |
| "Skandalouz" | 1996 | All Eyez on Me | Nate Dogg | Dat Nigga Daz | |
| "Skank Wit U" | 1994 | Faded | Don Jagwarr | | |
| "Sleep" | 2006 | Pac's Life | Chamillionaire, Young Buck | Sha Money XL | |
| "Slippin' Into Darkness (Salsa Con Soulfood Mix)" | 1996 | Slippin' Into Darkness (Single) | Funky Aztecs | | |
| "Smile" | 1997 | The Untouchable | Scarface | Mike Dean, Tone Capone, N.O. Joe | |
| "So Many Tears" | 1995 | Me Against the World | —N/a | Shock G | |
| "So Much Pain" | 2001 | Pain Is Love | Ja Rule | Irv Gotti, Lil' Rob | |
| "Soldier Like Me (Return of the Soulja)" | 2004 | Loyal to the Game | Eminem | Eminem, Luis Resto, (co.) | |
| "Something Wicked" | 1991 | 2Pacalypse Now | Pee-Wee | Jeremy | |
| "Something 2 Die 4" | 1993 | Strictly 4 My Niggaz | —N/a | 2Pac, Big D the Impossible | |
| "Soon As I Get Home" | 2006 | Pac's Life | Yaki Kadafi | QDIII | |
| "Soulja's Story" | 1991 | 2Pacalypse Now | —N/a | Big D the Impossible | |
| "Souljah's Revenge" | 1993 | Strictly 4 My Niggaz | —N/a | Bobcat | |
| "Starin' Through My Rear View" | 1997 | Gang Related: The Soundtrack | Outlawz | | |
| "Starin' Through My Rear View" (Nu-Mixx) | 2007 | Evolution: Duets and Remixes | Dwele | Street Radio, Bob Perry, Arnold Mischklnig | |
| "Static Mix, Pt. 1" | 2007 | Beginnings: The Lost Tapes 1988-1991 | —N/a | Chopmaster J | |
| "Static Mix, Pt. 2" | 2007 | Beginnings: The Lost Tapes 1988-1991 | —N/a | Chopmaster J | |
| "Stay True" | 1994 | Thug Life: Volume 1 | Mopreme Shakur | Thug Music | |
| "Still Ballin'" | 2002 | Better Dayz | Trick Daddy | Nitty | |
| "Still I Rise" | 1999 | Still I Rise | Kastro, Ta'He, Yaki Kadafi, Napoleon, Young Noble | Johnny "J" | |
| "Stop the Gunfight" | 1997 | Stop the Gunfight | Trapp, The Notorious B.I.G. | | |
| "Stop the Music" | 2007 | Startin' from Scratch: How a Thug Was Born | Layzie Bone, Thin C | | |
| "Street Fame" | 2002 | Better Dayz | —N/a | BRISS | |
| "The Streetz R Deathrow" | 1993 | Strictly 4 My Niggaz | Ice Cube | Stretch | |
| "Strictly 4 My N.I.G.G.A.Z" | 1993 | Strictly 4 My Niggaz | Pacific Heights | Lay Law | |
| "Strugglin'" | 1993 | Strictly 4 My Niggaz | Live Squad | Live Squad | |
| "Str8 Ballin'" | 1994 | Thug Life: Volume 1 | —N/a | Easy Mo Bee | |
| "Tattoo Tears" | 1999 | Still I Rise | Young Noble, Napoleon, Yaki Kadafi, Kastro | Kurupt, E.D.I. Mean | |
| "Teardrops and Closed Caskets" | 1999 | Still I Rise | Outlawz, Nate Dogg | QDIII | |
| "Temptations" | 1995 | Me Against the World | —N/a | Easy Mo Bee | |
| "There U Go" | 2002 | Better Dayz | Big Syke, Outlawz | Johnny "J" | |
| "They Don't Give a Fuck" | 2004 | Son Rize Vol. 1 | Yaki Kadafi, Hussein Fatal | | |
| "They Don't Give a Fuck About Us" | 2002 | Better Dayz | Outlawz | Johnny "J" | |
| "They're Tryin' To Kill Me" | 2000 | —N/a | Onyx | | |
| "This Ain't Livin'" | 2001 | Until the End of Time | Vanessa | Johnny "J" | |
| "This Life I Lead" | 2002 | Better Dayz | Outlawz | Johnny "J" | |
| "Throw Your Hands Up" | 1995 | Pump Ya Fist Soundtrack | —N/a | | |
| "Thug Luv" | 1997 | The Art of War | Bone Thugs-n-Harmony | DJ U-Neek | |
| "Thug N U Thug N Me" | 2001 | Until the End of Time | K-Ci & JoJo | Johnny "J" | |
| "Thug N U Thug N Me" (Remix) | 2001 | Until the End of Time | K-Ci & JoJo | Johnny "J" | |
| "Thug Nature" | 2000 | Too Gangsta for Radio | —N/a | | |
| "Thug Passion" | 1996 | All Eyez on Me | Outlawz, Jewell, Storm | Johnny "J", 2Pac | |
| "Thug Style" | 1997 | R U Still Down? (Remember Me) | —N/a | We Got Kidz | |
| "Thug 4 Life" | 2004 | Loyal to the Game | —N/a | Eminem, Luis Resto, (co.) | |
| "Thugs Get Lonely Too" | 2004 | Loyal to the Game | Nate Dogg | Eminem, Luis Resto, (co.) | |
| "Thugs Get Lonely Too" (Alt. Version) | 2004 | —N/a | Tech N9ne | QDIII | |
| "Thugz Mansion" | 2002 | Better Dayz | Anthony Hamilton | 7 Aurelius | |
| "Thugz Mansion" (Acoustic Version) | 2002 | Better Dayz | Nas, J.Phoenix | Pitboss, Novelist, Claudio Cueni | |
| "Thugz Mansion (N.Y.)" | 2002 | God's Son | Nas, J. Phoenix | Claudio Cueni, Michael Herring | |
| "To Live & Die In L.A." | 1996 | The Don Killuminati: The 7 Day Theory | Val Young | QDIII | |
| "Toss It Up" | 1996 | The Don Killuminati: The 7 Day Theory | Danny Boy, Aaron Hall, K-Ci & JoJo | Dametrius Ship, Reggie Moore | |
| "Toss It Up" (Remix) | 2003 | Nu-Mixx Klazzics | Danny Boy, Aaron Hall, K-Ci & JoJo | | |
| "Tradin' War Stories" | 1996 | All Eyez on Me | C-Bo, Outlawz, Storm, CPO | Mike Mosley, Rick Rock | |
| "Trapped" | 1991 | 2Pacalypse Now | Shock G | The Underground Railroad | |
| "Troublesome '96" | 1998 | Greatest Hits | —N/a | Johnny "J" | |
| "Trying to Make It Through" | 2005 | Arch Nemesis | Benzino, Freddie Foxxx | | |
| "U Can Be Touched" | 1999 | Still I Rise | Napoleon, E.D.I. Mean, Kastro, Young Noble, Yaki Kadafi | Johnny "J" | |
| "U Can Call" | 2002 | Better Dayz | Jazze Pha | Jazze Pha | |
| "U Gotta Take It (One Day At a Time)" | 2004 | The Ridah | Spice 1, LP, Headstrong | | |
| "Unborn Letters" | 2004 | Son Rize Vol. 1 | Yaki Kadafi, Rizz, the Kidz | | |
| "Unchained" | 2012 | Quentin Tarantino's Django Unchained: The Original Motion Picture Soundtrack | James Brown | | |
| "Unconditional Love" | 1998 | Greatest Hits | Nanci Fletcher | Johnny "J" | |
| "Under Pressure" | 1994 | Thug Life: Volume 1 | —N/a | Thug Music | |
| "Until the End of Time" | 2001 | Until the End of Time | R.L. Huggar | Trackmasters | |
| "Until the End of Time" (Remix) | 2001 | Until the End of Time | Richard Page | Johnny "J", Nitty | |
| "Untouchable" | 2006 | Pac's Life | Hussein Fatal, Yaki Kadafi, Gravy | Sha Money XL | |
| "Untouchable" | 2001 | Supernova | Left Eye | | |
| "Untouchable" (Remix) | 2006 | Pac's Life | Krayzie Bone | Swizz Beatz | |
| "The Uppercut" | 2004 | Loyal to the Game | E.D.I. Mean, Young Noble | Eminem, Luis Resto, (co.) | |
| "Violent" | 1991 | 2Pacalypse Now | DJ Fuze, Money B, Mac Mone | Raw Fusion | |
| "Wanted Dead or Alive" | 2007 | Evolution: Duets and Remixes | Snoop Dogg | Jiggolo | |
| "We Do This" | 1995 | Cocktails | Too Short, MC Breed, Father Dom | | |
| "What'z Next?" | 2006 | Pac's Life | A3, Jay Rock | Salih Williams | |
| "What'z Ya Phone #" | 1996 | All Eyez on Me | Danny Boy | Johnny "J" | |
| "What'z Ya Phone #" (Nu-Mixx) | 2007 | Evolution: Duets and Remixes | Candy Hill | Illmind | |
| "Whatcha Gonna Do?" | 2002 | Better Dayz | Outlawz | E.D.I. Mean | |
| "When I Get Free" | 1997 | R U Still Down? (Remember Me) | —N/a | We Got Kidz | |
| "When I Get Free" | 2001 | Until the End of Time | J. Valentine | Cold 187um, SR. Shakur | |
| "When I Get Free II" | 1997 | R U Still Down? (Remember Me) | Yaki Kadafi | Chris Rosser | |
| "When We Ride" | 1996 | All Eyez on Me | Outlaw Immortalz, Nanci Fletcher, | DJ Pooh | |
| "When We Ride On Our Enemies" | 2002 | Better Dayz | Outlaw Immortalz | BRISS | |
| "Where Do We Go From Here" | 1997 | R U Still Down? (Remember Me) | —N/a | Tony Pizarro, 2Pac | |
| "Where Will I Be?" | 2004 | Son Rize Vol. 1 | Yaki Kadafi, Young Thugz | | |
| "Wherever U Are (Sho' Shot)" | 1996 | —N/a | Big Daddy Kane | Johnny "J" | |
| "White Man'z World" | 1996 | The Don Killuminati: The 7 Day Theory | Big D | Big D | |
| "Who Believes?" | 2004 | Son Rize Vol. 1 | Yaki Kadafi, Fatalveli | | |
| "Who Do U Believe In?" | 2002 | Better Dayz | Nanci Fletcher, Yaki Kadafi, Big Pimpin' Delemond | Johnny "J" | |
| "Who Do You Love?" | 2004 | Loyal to the Game | —N/a | Eminem, Luis Resto, (co.) | |
| "Why U Turn On Me" | 2001 | Until the End of Time | —N/a | JIM GITTUM, Darren Vegas, Crooked I | |
| "Wonda Why They Call U Bytch" | 1996 | All Eyez on Me | —N/a | Johnny "J", 2Pac | |
| "Words of Wisdom" | 1991 | 2Pacalypse Now | —N/a | Shock G | |
| "Words 2 My First Born" | 2001 | Until the End of Time | Above the Law | DJ Quik | |
| "World Wide Mob Figgaz" | 2001 | Until the End of Time | Outlawz, Ta'He | Johnny "J" | |
| "Worldwide" (Remix) | 2001 | Novakane | E.D.I. Mean, Napoleon, Young Noble | DJ Felli Fell | |
| "Wussup wit the Luv" | 1993 | The Body-Hat Syndrome | Digital Underground | D-Flow Production Squad | |
| "Young Black Male" | 1991 | 2Pacalypse Now | —N/a | Big D the Impossible | |
| "Young Niggaz" | 1995 | Me Against the World | —N/a | Funky Drummer, Moe Z.M.D. | |
| "#1 With a Bullet" | 1991 | Live from the Styleetron | Raw Fusion | Money B | |
| "2 of Amerikaz Most Wanted" | 1996 | All Eyez on Me | Snoop Doggy Dogg | Dat Nigga Daz | |
| "2 of Amerikaz Most Wanted" (Nu-Mixx) | 2003 | Nu-Mixx Klazzics | Crooked I | | |
| "4 tha Hustlas" | 1997 | Big Thangs | Ant Banks, Too Short, MC Breed, Otis & Shug | | |
| "5 Deadly Venomz" | 1993 | Strictly 4 My Niggaz | Treach, Apache, Live Squad | Stretch | |
| "16 On Death Row" | 1997 | R U Still Down? (Remember Me) | —N/a | 2Pac | |
| "Loyal to the Game" | 1994 | Regulate (single) | Treach, Riddler | Reginald Heard | |
| "High 'Til I Die" | 1996 | Sunset Park (soundtrack) | | Tony Pizarro | |

== See also ==
- Tupac Shakur discography
