= Best of 2Pac =

Compilation album by 2Pac

Greatest hits album by 2Pac
- Released: December 3, 2007
- Genre: Hip-hop
- Label: Amaru; Interscope; Death Row; UMG

2Pac chronology
Nu-Mixx Klazzics Vol. 2 (2007)	Best of 2Pac (2007)

Best of 2Pac is a posthumous greatest hits compilation series from rapper Tupac Shakur released in two parts – Thug and Life. Both albums were released on December 4, 2007 in the United States and December 3, 2007 in the United Kingdom, having had been leaked on November 30. As of September 2011, more than 212,399 copies of Thug have been sold in the United States, while Life has sold more than 135,249.

== Best of 2Pac, Part 1: Thug ==
Best of 2Pac, Part 1: Thug

Greatest hits album by 2Pac
- Recorded: 1991–1996
- Length: 51:54

Professional ratings
Review scores
Source	Rating
AllMusic	link
Mobster Music	4/5 stars

Best of 2Pac, Part 1: Thug is a posthumously released compilation album which is the first part of Best of 2Pac. It is sold separately from part 2 and was released on December 4, 2007. It consists mostly of songs released before his death.

=== Track listing ===
No.	Title	Producer	Length
1.	"2 of Amerikaz Most Wanted" (feat. Snoop Doggy Dogg, from All Eyez On Me, 1996)	Dat Nigga Daz	4:06
2.	"California Love (Original Mix)" (feat. Dr. Dre, Roger Troutman)	Dr. Dre	4:44
3.	"So Many Tears" (from Me Against The World, 1995)	Shock G	3:58
4.	"I Ain't Mad at Cha" (feat. Danny Boy, from All Eyez On Me, 1996)	Dat Nigga Daz	4:54
5.	"How Do U Want It" (feat. K-Ci & JoJo, from All Eyez On Me, 1996)	Johnny "J"	4:47
6.	"Trapped" (from 2Pacalypse Now, 1991)	Ramon Pee Wee Godson	4:45
7.	"Changes" (feat. Talent, from Greatest Hits, 1998)	Deon Big D The Impossible Evans	4:29
8.	"Hail Mary" (feat. Outlawz, from The Don Killuminati: The 7 Day Theory, 1996)	Hurt-M-Badd	5:12
9.	"Unconditional Love" (from Greatest Hits, 1998)	Johnny "J"	3:58
10.	"Dear Mama (Remix)" (feat. Anthony Hamilton, from Pac's Life, 2006)	Frank Nitty	5:29
11.	"Resist the Temptation" (feat. Amel Larrieux, previously unreleased)	Jake One (Originally produced by Big D The Impossible)	5:44

=== Charts ===
==== Weekly charts ====
Chart (2007)	Peak position
UK Albums (OCC)	76
US Billboard 200	65
US Top R&B/Hip-Hop Albums (Billboard)	13
US Top Rap Albums (Billboard)	6

Chart (2025)	Peak position
Hungarian Physical Albums (MAHASZ)	36

==== Year-end charts ====
Chart (2008)	Position
US Top R&B/Hip-Hop Albums (Billboard)	92

=== Certifications ===
Region	Certification	Certified units/sales
United Kingdom (BPI)	Silver	60,000^{‡}
^{‡} Sales+streaming figures based on certification alone.

== Best of 2Pac, Part 2: Life ==
Best of 2Pac, Part 2: Life

Greatest hits album by 2Pac
- Recorded: 1993–2005
- Length: 46:50

Professional ratings
Review scores
Source	Rating
AllMusic	link
Mobster Music	4/5 stars

Best of 2Pac, Part 2: Life is a posthumously released compilation album which is the second part of Best of 2Pac. It is sold separately from part 1 and was released on December 4, 2007. It consists mostly of songs released after his death.

=== Track listing ===
No.	Title	Producer	Length
1.	"Definition of a Thug Nigga" (from R U Still Down? (Remember Me), 1997)	Warren G	4:08
2.	"Still Ballin' (Nitty Remix)" (feat. Trick Daddy, from Better Dayz, 2002)	Frank Nitty (Original by Johnny "J")	2:50
3.	"Until the End of Time (RP Remix)" (feat. Richard Page, from Until the End of Time, 2001)	Johnny "J" & Frank Nitty	4:28
4.	"Never Call U Bitch Again" (feat. Tyrese, from Better Dayz, 2002)	Johnny "J"	4:38
5.	"They Don't Give a Fuck About Us" (feat. The Outlawz, from Better Dayz)	Johnny "J"	5:06
6.	"Keep Ya Head Up" (feat. Dave Hollister, from Strictly 4 My N.I.G.G.A.Z., 1993)	DJ Daryl	4:24
7.	"Ghetto Gospel" (feat. Elton John, from Loyal to the Game, 2004)	Eminem (Originally produced by Big D The Impossible)	3:58
8.	"Brenda's Got a Baby" (from 2Pacalypse Now, 1991)	Deon Big D The Impossible Evans	3:53
9.	"Thugz Mansion" (feat. J. Phoenix, from Better Dayz, 2002)	A. "Pitboss" Johnson, Aulsondro "Novelist" Hamilton, and Claudio Cueni (Original by Johnny "J")	4:12
10.	"When I Get Free III" (from Until the End of Time, 2001)	Cold 187um	4:30
11.	"Dopefiend’s Diner" (previously unreleased)	Ivan "Orthodox" Barias & Carvin "Ransum" Haggins Vocals by Jessica "Betty Jo" Santos/Salinaz (Originally produced by Big D The Impossible)	4:53

=== Charts ===
Chart (2007)	Peak position
US Billboard 200	77
US Top R&B/Hip-Hop Albums (Billboard)	15
US Top Rap Albums (Billboard)	8

=== Certifications ===
Region	Certification	Certified units/sales
United Kingdom (BPI)	Silver	60,000^{‡}
^{‡} Sales+streaming figures based on certification alone.
