= IDGAF =

IDGAF is an acronym for "I don't give a fuck". It may refer to:

- "I Don't Give a Fuck", also known as "IDGAF", a song by 2Pac
- "IDGAF" (Dua Lipa song), 2017
- "IDGAF" (BoyWithUke song), 2022
- "IDGAF" (Tee Grizzley song), 2023
- "IDGAF" (Drake song), 2023
- "IDGAF", a song by Nelly on the 2013 album M.O.
- "IDGAF", a song by CJ Fly on the 2016 album Flytrap
- "IDGAF", a 2019 song by Ängie
- "I.D.G.A.F.", a song by Breathe Carolina from the 2009 album Hello Fascination
- "I.D.G.A.F.", a song by Daz Dilly from the 2014 album Weed Money
- #IDGAF, a 2013 mixtape by Ludacris
- IDGAF, a 2013 music video featuring Snootie Wild
- "IDGAF Suite", a song by Billy Hart from the album Oshumare
- "IDGAF", a song by Lil Peep from the album Come Over When You're Sober, Pt. 2
- "IDGAF", a 2022 song by 42 Dugg
- "IDGAF", a song by As It Is from the album I Went to Hell and Back
- "IDGAF", a song by Sampa the Great from the album As Above, So Below

== See also ==
- I Don't Give a Fuck (disambiguation)
- "The F Bomb (IDGAFS)", a 2012 single by EarthGang
- "IDGAFOS", a 2011 song by American record producer Dillon Francis
