= I Don't Give a Fuck (disambiguation) =

"I Don't Give a Fuck" is a 1991 song by 2Pac featuring Pogo.

I Don't Give a Fuck may also refer to:

- "I Don't Give a Fuck", a song by Lil Jon & the East Side Boyz featuring Mystikal & Krayzie Bone from the album Kings of Crunk
- "I Don't Give a Fuk", a song by T-Pain from the album Revolver

== See also ==
- "Just Don't Give a Fuck", a 1998 song by Eminem
- IDGAF (disambiguation)
- I Don't Give A (disambiguation)
