= Karolyn Ali =

American film producer (1944–2015)

- Born: August 29, 1944
- Died: August 18, 2015 (aged 70); Los Angeles, California, U.S.
- Occupation(s): Film and music video producer
- Years active: 1994-2015
- Notable work: Tupac: Resurrection

Karolyn Ali (August 29, 1944 – August 18, 2015) was an American film and music video producer, best known for her documentary Tupac: Resurrection. She started her career in the music industry, producing music and commercials. Ali worked for over 30 years on films, documentaries, music videos and commercials.

== Career ==
Ali was assistant to Benny Ashburn (manager of the Commodores) early in her career. She served as an executive at SOLAR Records where she worked in music video and commercial production. In 1984, she founded Renge Films (along with Bill Parker and Peter Allen) to produce commercials. The company produced commercials for companies such as Coca-Cola and McDonald's. Ali was a prolific producer of music videos (over 200) including Stevie Wonder's "Part Time Lover."

In 1994, Ali produced her first feature film Kla$h, which starred Giacarlo Esposito and Jasmine Guy. In 2000, she joined Amaru Entertainment (Tupac Shakur's company) as a senior production executive. In 2004, Ali was nominated for the Academy Award for Best Documentary Feature for her film Tupac: Resurrection, which she co-produced with Lauren Lazin and Preston Holmes. She helped coordinate Shakur's memorial after his death.

Over her career, she worked with performers such as Ziggy Marley, Dionne Warwick and Burt Bacharach.

Jasmine Guy described Ali in her book: "Karolyn is confident, articulate, worldly. She knows how to negotiate; she knows how to pitch. She knows how to talk on the phone. She knows how to conduct business without carrying the weight of her personal problems in the office. She knows how to talk to all kinds of people - white men, Black women, young brothers or sassy sisters, family members, business associates, money folk or moody artists."

== Accolades ==
Ali was a recipient of the Lillian Gish Award from the organization Women in Film and the NAACP/Legal Defense Fund's award for Entrepreneur of the Year. She was a founding member of Theatre of Hearts/Youth First Artists-In-Residence and also a board chair. That organization helps empower under-served youth in Los Angeles.

== Death ==
Ali died on August 18, 2015, at her home in Los Angeles at the age of 70.
