= I Gotta Be Me =

Studio album by Johnny "J"
- Released: February 10, 1994
- Recorded: 1993
- Genres: Hip hop; dancehall
- Length: 41:00
- Labels: Solar; Epic
- Producers: Johnny "J"; Charlie Macc; King Scratch

Singles from I Gotta Be Me
- 1. "P.O.P. (Got Control of Me)"

I Gotta Be Me is a 1994 album by hip-hop producer Johnny "J", featuring hits such as "Something She Can Fill" and "It's a Wonderful Day". It was his only solo album before his death. Released by Shade Tree Records, the album was distributed by Solar Records by way of their recently formed independent label distribution unit, The J. Hines Company.

I Gotta Be Me was an album that explored Johnny J's lyrical skills and abilities as well as his experiences in life, love, sex, relationships, and music, and was also the first appearance of the gangsta-themed female Hip-Hop/R&B quartet Y?N-Vee, who soon after recorded with Johnny J's friend 2Pac and his affiliate group, Thug Life, and released their one and only album for PMP Records, the same label that launched the career of R&B star Montell Jordan a year later. I Gotta Be Me spawned two singles -- "Get Away From Me" and the Bass rap cut, "Diggin Um' Out".

The musical backing track of the song "Better Off" was later recycled into the tune "Picture Me Rollin'" by Tupac for his album All Eyez On Me in 1996.

== Track listing ==
#	Title	Featured Guest(s)	Producer	Time
1	"Something She Can Feel"		Johnny "J"	4:01
2	"Diggin Um' Out"		Johnny "J"	3:46
3	"I'm a Better Man"		Johnny "J"	3:57
4	"Why You Want Me Now?"		Johnny "J"	2:47
5	"Get Away from Me"		Johnny "J"	3:58
6	"P.O.P. (Got Control Of Me)"		Johnny "J"	3:21
7	"Better Off"	Mel-Low	Johnny "J"	3:49
8	"It's a Wonderful Day"		Johnny "J"	4:28
9	"Shake dat Ass"		Johnny "J"	3:41
10	"Say Whatcha Gotta Say"	Big Syke, Y?N-Vee	Johnny "J"	3:16
11	"Love's the Way"		Johnny "J"	4:25

== Album singles ==
Single information
"Get Away From Me"
- Released: 1994
- B-side: Shake Dat Ass
"Diggin Um' Out"
- Released: 1994
- B-side: P.O.P. (Got Control Of Me)
