= Beginnings: The Lost Tapes 1988–1991 =

Compilation album by 2Pac
- Released: June 12, 2007 (US)
- Recorded: 1988–1991
- Genre: Gangsta rap; new jack swing; political hip hop
- Label: Koch
- Producer: Chopmaster J, Shock-G, Strictly Dope

2Pac chronology
Pac's Life (2006)	Beginnings: The Lost Tapes 1988–1991 (2007)	Nu-Mixx Klazzics Vol. 2 (2007)

Beginnings: The Lost Tapes 1988–1991 is a compilation album featuring previously unreleased recordings by American rapper 2Pac. It was originally released on April 18, 2000, by the independent label Herb 'N Soul Records under the title The Lost Tapes: Circa 1989. However, the release was quickly recalled due to the label lacking authorization from Afeni Shakur, the head of 2Pac’s estate. The track "Panther Power" was later included on the Tupac: Resurrection soundtrack, and the album was officially reissued in 2007 through Koch and Amaru Entertainment, with Afeni Shakur's approval, under an altered title and with new artwork.

== Background ==
Beginnings is a compilation of 2Pac’s earliest recordings, created prior to his work on his debut studio album, 2Pacalypse Now, in collaboration with his original group, Strictly Dope. The tracks were produced by Digital Underground and Strictly Dope member Chopmaster J, who, in early 2000, rediscovered the recordings in his mother’s basement—believing them to have been lost in 1991. He subsequently compiled the material into an album release.

== Critical reception ==
Professional ratings
Review scores
Source	Rating
AllMusic	link

CD Universe noted that Shakur's "flow and lyrical content are more reminiscent of late-1980s/early-1990s icons like Big Daddy Kane and Rakim" than of the later songs of 2Pac himself. Jason Birchmeier of Allmusic agreed that the rapper sounds "inspired here, no doubt, but nonetheless a bit clumsy and imitative". Birchmeier also commented that "there's little more here than skeletal drum machine beats for production". It also seems much of the political content of the songs has been overlooked.

== Track listing ==
No.	Title	Length
1.	"Panther Power"	4:36
2.	"The Case of the Misplaced Mic Pt. 1"	2:34
3.	"Let Knowledge Drop"	3:37
4.	"Never Be Beat"	5:33
5.	"A Day in the Life"	4:55
6.	"My Burnin' Heart"	6:25
7.	"Minnie the Moocher"	4:19
8.	"The Case of the Misplaced Mic, Pt. 2"	2:40
9.	"Static Mix, Pt. 1"	4:19
10.	"Static Mix, Pt. 2"	3:59
