= Letter 2 My Unborn =

Single by 2Pac

from the album Until the End of Time
- Released: June 5, 2001
- Recorded: November 14, 1995
- Genre: R&B, hip hop
- Length: 3:55
- Label: Interscope, Amaru, Death Row
- Songwriters: Tupac Shakur, Johnny Jackson
- Producers: Johnny "J", Trackmasters

2Pac singles chronology
"Until the End of Time" (2001)	"Letter 2 My Unborn" (2001)	"Thugz Mansion" (2002)

Music video
- "Letter 2 My Unborn" on YouTube

"Letter 2 My Unborn" is a song by Tupac Shakur, released as a posthumous single from his album Until the End of Time in 2001.

The accompanying music video received moderate airplay though it was less successful than the lead single from the album, the title track. The single peaked at number 64 in the airplay chart.

== Lyrical content ==
In the song, Tupac speaks to his then-unborn child as a precaution for fear that he would not be able to meet or speak with them in the event of his death prior to their birth. Shakur relays stories of his own life and advises the child to avoid the troubles that he faced.

== Composition ==
The song samples Michael Jackson's 1987 hit "Liberian Girl" (from Bad, 1987), but is set at a higher tempo and features a female vocal backing track by Tena Jones (formerly of 4th Avenue Jones).

== Track listing ==
12"

1. "Letter 2 My Unborn" - 3:55
2. "Letter 2 My Unborn" (instrumental) - 3:55
3. "Hell 4 a Hustler" - 4:56

Promo

- Side A
1. "Letter 2 My Unborn" - 3:57
2. "Letter 2 My Unborn" (instrumental) - 3:57
3. "Letter 2 My Unborn" (a cappella) - 3:56
- Side B
1. "Niggaz Nature" (remix) (radio edit) - 3:45
2. "Niggaz Nature" (remix) - 5:04
3. "Niggaz Nature" (remix) (instrumental) - 5:08
4. "Niggaz Nature" (remix) (a cappella) - 4:57

== Chart positions ==
Weekly chart performance for "Letter 2 My Unborn" by 2Pac
Chart (2001)	Peak position
Belgium (Ultratop 50 Flanders)	2
Germany (GfK)	76
Ireland (IRMA)	22
Netherlands (Dutch Top 40)	41
Netherlands (Single Top 100)	61
UK Singles (OCC)	21
US Hot R&B/Hip-Hop Songs (Billboard)	64
