= I Don't Give A (disambiguation) =

"I Don't Give A" is a song by Madonna from her album MDNA

I Don't Give A may also refer to:

- "I Don't Give A" (Lisa Ajax song), 2017
- "I Don't Give A...", a song by Missio from their album Loner
- "I Don't Give A...", a song by Peaches from her album Fatherfucker

== See also ==
- I Don't Give a Fuck (disambiguation)
- "I Don't Giva", a song by Kristinia DeBarge from Thinkin Out Loud
- "I Don't Give", a song by Avril Lavigne from Let Go
- "Just Don't Give a Fuck", a song by Eminem
