= Tupac Amaru Shakur Center for the Arts =

Performing arts center in Stone Mountain, Georgia

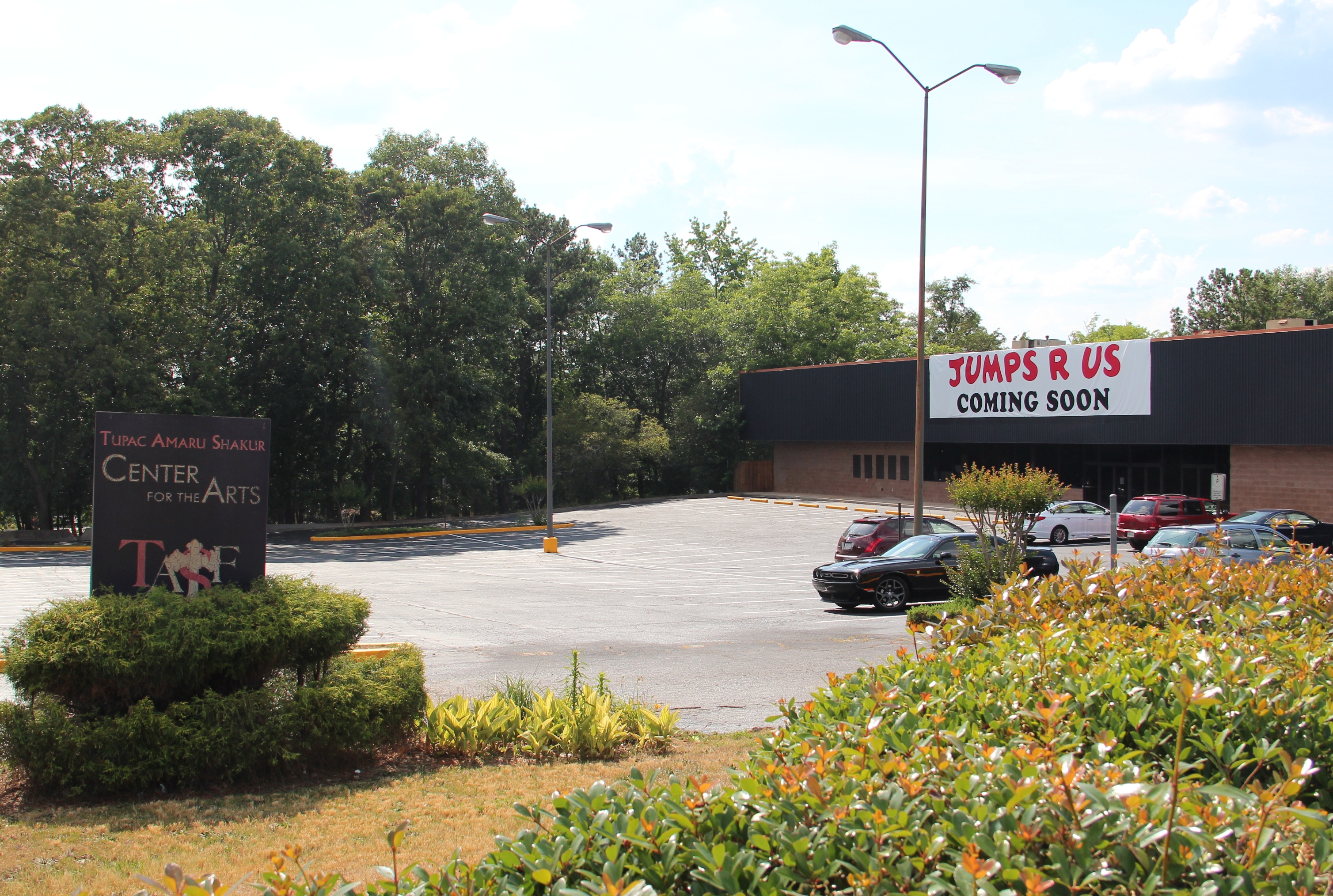
- Site where the center was located, 2016
- Interactive map of Tupac Amaru Shakur Center for the Arts
- Address: 5616 Memorial Drive
- Location: Stone Mountain, Georgia
- Coordinates: 33.80164°N 84.20825°W
- Type: Performing arts center

Construction
- Opened: 1997
- Closed: 2015

The Tupac Amaru Shakur Center for the Arts, based in Stone Mountain, Georgia, was a performing arts center supported through the Shakur Family Foundation. The Shakur Center's mission was to provide opportunities for young people through the arts, and offered programs such as drama, dance, and creative writing classes. The organization also ran a Performing Arts Day Camp for youth ages twelve to eighteen.

The center, located off Memorial Drive, was named in honor of the late American hip hop artist Tupac Amaru Shakur, and was founded by his mother Afeni Shakur.

== History ==
The center was founded in 1997 by Tupac Shakur's mother Afeni Shakur in the interest of preserving her son's legacy. It was designed to bring quality arts training to young people including some students who face many social-economic issues such as poverty. Many students have enriched their artistic abilities through this center and some have even received part-time jobs.

In July 1999, the foundation began its first annual summer session of PA camps with twenty campers. The camp continued to grow throughout the years. On June 11, 2005, The Tupac Amaru Shakur Center for the Arts Peace Garden and visitor center was opened. The peace garden was designed as a tribute to Tupac Shakur as well as others who have died. In 2006, the music video for the single Pac's Life, from Tupac's eponymous album was shot on location. Tupac's mother Afeni Shakur also went to Africa in 2006 and fostered a relationship between the Center and the Nelson Mandela Foundation.

After 2006, the foundation showed signs of growth as many additional programs were created such as after-school programs, dance classes, and cultural exchange programs. Fees for these programs resembled prices for joining local sports leagues. The foundation also held Tupac birthday concert celebrations since 2009.

== Programs ==
The foundation offered acting, after-school, and dancing classes. In addition, they offered yearly leadership and arts programs. They had also set up cross-cultural exchanges with Japan and South Africa.

== Closure of the Center and death of Afeni Shakur ==
In August 2015, Afeni Shakur sold the property upon which the Tupac Amaru Shakur Center for the Arts stood, for $1.2 million. On May 2 of the following year, Tupac's mother died of a suspected heart attack.
