= Pac's Life (song) =

Single by 2Pac featuring Ashanti and T.I.

from the album Pac's Life
- Released: October 21, 2006
- Recorded: July 29, 1996 (2Pac vocals)
- Genre: Hip-hop; R&B
- Length: 3:37
- Label: Amaru; Interscope
- Songwriters: Tupac Shakur; Clifford Harris; Ashanti Douglas; Prince Nelson
- Producer: L. T. Hutton

2Pac singles chronology
"Untouchable" (2006)	"Pac's Life" (2006)	"Playa Cardz Right" (2008)

Ashanti singles chronology
"Still on It" (2005)	"Pac's Life" (2006)	"Put a Little Umph in It" (2007)

T.I. singles chronology
"Live in the Sky" (2006)	"Pac's Life" (2006)	"Top Back" (2006)

Music video
- "Pac's Life" on YouTube

"Pac's Life" is a single written and performed by American rappers Tupac Shakur, T.I. and R&B singer Ashanti, produced by L. T. Hutton for Shakur's posthumously released album of the same name. It is a hip hop and R&B song; the second Tupac verse was recycled from a song titled "This Life I Lead". T.I. said in an interview that working on the song was an honor, as he idolized him while growing up.

The single peaked at #1 on the Billboard Bubbling Under R&B/Hip-Hop Singles in the December 2, 2006 issue of Billboard magazine. It was also a top ten hit in Ireland and peaked at number 21 in the UK. On MTV Australia, "Pac's Life" peaked at the number 1 spot on the Hip Hop Countdown, beating new releases from Jay-Z, Eminem and 50 Cent, and Nas.

The original version of the song samples Prince's "Pop Life" and is 2 minutes and 20 seconds in duration. It features Tupac's first verse followed by Tupac singing the hook.

== Music video ==
The video made its world premiere on the BET music network in the United States on November 22, 2006. The video was featured on BET's Access Granted, where viewers saw the process of filming the video for "Pac's Life". Both T.I. and Ashanti were featured in the long-awaited video, which was filmed at the Tupac Amaru Shakur Center for the Arts, in Atlanta, Georgia. The video premiered on MTV on November 28, 2006.

== Official remix ==
A remix with Snoop Dogg and Chris Starr appeared on the album, changing the vocals, and changing the recycled verse to a verse made by Snoop Dogg. The positioning of some ad-libs was also changed and Snoop Dogg was implemented into the chorus of the song which was originally only performed by Ashanti.

== Track listing ==
12" (EU)

1. "Pac's Life" (album version) (featuring T.I. and Ashanti)
2. "Scared Straight"
3. "Untouchable (Swizz Beatz Remix)"

CD (UK)

1. "Pac's Life" (album version) (featuring T.I. and Ashanti)
2. "Scared Straight"

== Charts ==
=== Weekly charts ===
Chart (2006–2007)	Peak position
Australia (ARIA)	34
Germany (GfK)	31
Ireland (IRMA)	9
New Zealand (Recorded Music NZ)	38
Scottish Singles Sales (Official Charts)	19
UK Singles (Official Charts)	21
UK Hip Hop/R&B (Official Charts)	1
US Bubbling Under Hot 100 (Billboard)	19
US Bubbling Under R&B/Hip-Hop Singles (Billboard)	1

=== Year-end charts ===
Chart (2007)	Position
UK Urban (Music Week)	26

== Release history ==
Region	Date
United States	October 21, 2006
United Kingdom	February 5, 2007

== Certifications ==
Certifications for "Pac's Life"
Region	Certification	Certified units/sales
New Zealand (RMNZ)	Gold	15,000^{‡}
^{‡} Sales+streaming figures based on certification alone.
