= If My Homie Calls =

Single by 2Pac

from the album 2Pacalypse Now
- Released: December 20, 1991
- Recorded: 1991
- Genre: Hip-hop
- Length: 4:18
- Label: Interscope; Jive
- Songwriter: Tupac Shakur
- Producer: Deon "Big D the Impossible" Evans

2Pac singles chronology
"Brenda's Got a Baby" (1991)	"If My Homie Calls" (1991)	"Call It What U Want" (1992)

Music video
- "If My Homie Calls" on YouTube

"If My Homie Calls" is a song by American rapper 2Pac from his debut album, 2Pacalypse Now (1991). The song was released as a double A-side single with Brenda's Got a Baby. A mostly black-and-white music video with elements of red, blue and sepia was made for the single. 2Pac performed the song live in 1992 on the popular MTV show Yo! MTV Raps. The song entered the rap singles chart in March 1992 and peaked at number three on May 1.

== Track listing ==
1. "If My Homie Calls" (LP version)
2. "Brenda's Got a Baby" (radio mix)
3. "If My Homie Calls" (instrumental)
4. "Brenda's Got a Baby" (instrumental)
