= Untouchable (Tupac Shakur song) =

"Untouchable (Swizz Beatz Remix)"
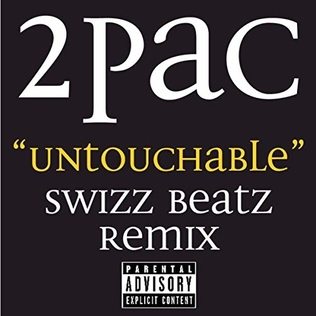

Single by 2Pac featuring Krayzie Bone

from the album Pac's Life
- Released: February 28, 2006
- Recorded: 1996, 2005
- Genre: Gangsta rap
- Length: 3:53
- Label: Amaru; Interscope
- Songwriter(s): Tupac Shakur
- Producer(s): Swizz Beatz

2Pac singles chronology
| "Ghetto Gospel" (2004) | "Untouchable (Swizz Beatz Remix)" (2006) | "Pac's Life" (2006) |

"Untouchable (Swizz Beatz Remix)" is a song by rapper Tupac Shakur. The song was released as a remix by Swizz Beatz and Krayzie Bone and was used to promote the 2006 posthumous album Pac's Life. Tupac recorded the song in June, 1996, just prior to the Makaveli recording sessions. The original version has never been officially released. In the Swizz Beatz remix, rapper Krayzie Bone replaces the original featured artists, recording his part sometime in 2005. As the song was released as a promotional single only, no official music video for the song was created. The song contains lyrics similar to other Tupac songs, such as "Killuminati", "Untouchable (Freestyle Version)" and "Capture The Flag".

== Alternate versions ==
1. "Untouchable" Original Version (officially unreleased but leaked)
2. "Untouchable (Freestyle Version)" is a version recorded after the initial sessions for the song "Untouchable". The instrumental itself was remixed to a more "live" setting with Tupac laying down vocals while heavily intoxicated (officially unreleased but leaked).
3. "Untouchable" featuring Lisa Lopes (Supernova version)
4. "Untouchable" featuring Lisa Lopes (unreleased Death Row remix intended for the N.I.N.A. album)
5. "Legendary" featuring Lisa Lopes (2009 Eye Legacy remix, 2Pac's vocals were scrapped from the album due to copyright issues but can be found online)

Two remixes can be found on the album Pac's Life;

1. "Untouchable (Swizz Beatz Remix)" featuring Krayzie Bone
2. "Untouchable" a remix by Sha Money XL featuring Jamal "Gravy" Woolard, Yaki Kadafi and Hussein Fatal

The soundtrack to Quentin Tarantino's film Django Unchained contains a mashup of "Untouchable" with samples of James Brown's "The Payback".

== Charts ==
| Chart (2006) | Peak position |
|---|---|
| US Bubbling Under Hot 100 (Billboard) | 11 |
| US Hot R&B/Hip-Hop Songs (Billboard) | 91 |
