= A 2Pac Tribute: Dare 2 Struggle =

Studio album by Dr. Mutulu Shakur
- Released: June 16, 2006
- Genre: Rap
- Label: First Kut/Lyrical Knockout
- Producer: Dr. Mutulu Shakur; Raoul Juneja (aka Deejay Ra)

A 2Pac Tribute: Dare 2 Struggle is a posthumously released tribute album dedicated to the late hip hop icon, Tupac Shakur.

Dr. Mutulu Shakur (Tupac's stepfather) released the tribute album to commemorate Tupac's 35th birthday and 10 year passing anniversary. The album features contributions from rappers behind bars as well as those on the outside, including Mutulu Shakur's children Mopreme Shakur and Nzingha, as well as Outlawz, TQ, Slick, Imaan Faith and T-Jay. It was originally conceived before Tupac's 1996 murder, when he and Mopreme visited their father in prison and wrote the "Thug Code" to try to decrease gang violence.

Dare 2 Struggle includes a 16-page booklet that includes the "Thug Code" as well as a preview chapter of Shakur's historical novel about Tupac titled N 2 Da Gutter.

Mutulu Shakur is the executive producer of the album along with Canadian hip-hop activist Raoul Juneja (a.k.a. Deejay Ra). It's being released through Kent Entertainment's First Kut rap imprint in association with Juneja's Toronto-based Lyrical Knockout Entertainment company.

Half of the proceeds from the record's sales will go towards Shakur's inner city health and education initiative.

== Track listing ==
No.	Title	Performing Artist	Length
1.	"PSA (Public Service Announcement)"	Dr. Mutulu Shakur
2.	"Straight Ahead"	Mopreme Shakur
3.	"Blessings"	Outlawz
4.	"Since You've Been Gone"	SLICK
5.	"Enemies Of The State (recorded from prison)"	S.C.U. [Solitary Confinement Unit]
6.	"Never Give Up"	Legacy
7.	"The Truth (From prison & outside)"	Strap, Imaan Faith
8.	"Thug Code (from prison)"	S.C.U.
9.	"Still"	T-Jay
10.	"The First Teardrop (from prison & outside)"	S.C.U.
11.	"Listen"	TQ
12.	"The Struggle"	P.O.W. [Prisoners of War]
13.	"Missing In Action"	S.C.U.
14.	"For Tupac Amaru"	Dr. Mutulu Shakur
