= Until the End of Time (Tupac Shakur album) =

Studio album by 2Pac
- Released: March 27, 2001
- Recorded: October 14, 1995 – September 6, 1996 (2Pac's vocals); 1999–2001 (Production, guest vocals, and mixing)
- Studios: Can-Am (Tarzana, California); Skip Saylor (Hollywood); QD3 Soundlab (Los Angeles); Record One (Los Angeles); O'Henry Sound (Burbank, California); Pacifique (Hollywood)
- Genres: Hip hop; R&B
- Length: 123:59
- Labels: Amaru; Death Row; Interscope
- Producers: Suge Knight (exec.); Afeni Shakur (also exec.); Johnny "J"; QDIII; L.T. Hutton; DJ Quik; Mike Mosley; Kurt "Kobane" Couthon; Hurt-M-Badd; Cold 187um

2Pac chronology
Still I Rise (1999)	Until the End of Time (2001)	Better Dayz (2002)

Singles from Until the End of Time
- 1. "Happy Home" Released: December 2000; 2. "Until the End of Time" Released: February 18, 2001; 3. "Letter 2 My Unborn" Released: June 5, 2001

Professional ratings
Aggregate scores
Source	Rating
Metacritic	51/100
Review scores
Source	Rating
AllMusic	2.5/5 stars
Entertainment Weekly	B
HipHopDX	4/5
NME	6/10
RapReviews	8/10
Rolling Stone	2.5/5 stars
The Source	4/5 stars
Sputnikmusic	2.5/5
USA Today	3/4 stars
Wall of Sound	49/100

Until the End of Time is the seventh studio album and third posthumous album by American rapper 2Pac. It follows his previous posthumous albums R U Still Down? (Remember Me) and Still I Rise. The album consists of material recorded while the rapper was on Death Row Records from 1995 to 1996. The album debuted at number one on the US Billboard 200 chart, selling 426,870 copies in its first week. The album was certified quadruple platinum by Recording Industry Association of America (RIAA).

== Background ==
The album is the result of a collaboration between Afeni Shakur's Amaru Records and Suge Knight's Death Row Records, and features previously unreleased works by Shakur. The majority of the music compositions were remixed from their original state. Highly anticipated, Until the End of Time was ultimately one of the best selling hip hop albums of 2001. The core vocal tracks and some instrumentation was recorded during and after the All Eyez On Me and The Don Killuminati: The 7 Day Theory sessions.

== Accolades ==
BET placed the album number 3 on their list of the '25 Best Posthumous Albums of All Time'.

== Commercial performance ==
Until the End of Time debuted at number one on the US Billboard 200 chart, selling 426,870 copies in its first week, which will be the last number one album released by Death Row Records. On June 10, 2014, the album was certified 4× platinum by Recording Industry Association of America (RIAA) for sales of over four million copies in the United States.

On June 22, 2001, the album was certified Gold by British Phonographic Industry (BPI) for sales of over 100,000 copies in the United Kingdom. On May 24, 2001, the album was certified double platinum for sales of over 200,000 copies in Canada.

== Track listing ==
Credits adapted from the album's liner notes.

Disc 1
No.	Title	Writer(s)	Producer(s)	Length
1.	"Ballad of a Dead Soulja"	Tupac Shakur; Johnny Jackson; Big Simon	Johnny "J"^{[a]}; Cold 187um^{[b]}	4:15
2.	"Fuck Friendz"	Shakur; Quincy Jones III; Sean P. Young	QDIII	5:19
3.	"Lil' Homies"	Shakur; J. Jackson	Johnny "J"	3:43
4.	"Let 'Em Have It" (featuring SKG)	Shakur; Big Simon; Lenton Terrell Hutton; Donna Hunter	L.T. Hutton	4:53
5.	"Good Life" (featuring Big Syke & E.D.I. of the Outlawz)	Shakur; Mike Mosley; Malcolm Greenidge; Tyruss Himes	Mike Mosley	4:17
6.	"Letter 2 My Unborn"	Shakur; J. Jackson; Channette Higgens; Channoah Higgens; Michael Jackson	Johnny "J"^{[a]}; Tone^{[b]}; Frank "Nitty" Pimentel^{[c]}	3:55
7.	"Breathin'" (featuring Outlawz)	Shakur; J. Jackson; Rufus Cooper III; Mutah Beale; Greenidge; Katari Cox	Johnny "J"	4:04
8.	"Happy Home"	Shakur; J. Jackson; Big Simon	Johnny "J"^{[a]}; Jim Gettums^{[b]}; Dareen Vegas^{[b]}; Crooked I^{[b]}	3:56
9.	"All Out" (featuring Outlawz)	Shakur; Yafeu Fula; Cooper III; Beale; Greenidge; Cox	Big Simon Says	5:32
10.	"Fuckin' wit the Wrong Nigga"	Shakur; Tyrone Wrice	Tyrone Wrice	3:37
11.	"Thug N U Thug N Me" (Remix) (featuring K-Ci & JoJo)	Shakur; J. Jackson; Jewell Caples	Johnny "J"^{[a]}; Jamie Jones^{[b]}; Jason Pennock^{[b]}; Martin Kember^{[b]}	4:11
12.	"Everything They Owe"	Shakur; J. Jackson	Johnny "J"	3:07
13.	"Until the End of Time" (featuring R.L. Huggar of Next)	Shakur; J. Jackson; Steven George; John Lang; Richard Page	Johnny "J"^{[a]}; Tone^{[b]}; Frank "Nitty" Pimentel^{[c]}; Jamel Edgerton^{[c]}	4:26
14.	"M.O.B." (featuring Thug Life & Outlawz)	Shakur; Big Simon; Anthony Banks; Sonny Sowles; Fula; Bruce Washington, Jr.; Maurice Harding	Kurt "Kobane" Couthon^{[a]}; Ant Banks^{[b]}; Sonny B^{[b]}	5:01
15.	"World Wide Mob Figgaz" (featuring Outlawz)	Shakur; Jackson; Cooper III; Beale; Greenidge	Johnny "J"	4:37
Total length:				60:00

Disc 2
No.	Title	Writer(s)	Producer(s)	Length
1.	"Big Syke Interlude" (featuring Big Syke)	Big Simon; Himes	Cold 187um	1:45
2.	"My Closest Roaddogz"	Shakur; J. Jackson	Johnny "J"	4:04
3.	"Niggaz Nature" (Remix) (featuring Lil' Mo)	Shakur; Jones III; Cynthia Loving	QDIII	5:04
4.	"When Thugz Cry"	Shakur; J. Jackson	Johnny "J"	4:22
5.	"U Don't Have 2 Worry" (featuring Outlawz)	Shakur; Jones III; Fula; Cooper III; Beale; Cox; Greenidge; Hunter	QDIII	5:07
6.	"This Ain't Livin'"	Shakur; J. Jackson	Johnny "J"	3:41
7.	"Why U Turn on Me"	Shakur; Big Simon	2Pac^{[a]}; Jim Gettums^{[b]}; Dareen Vegas^{[b]}; Crooked I^{[b]}	3:32
8.	"LastOnesLeft" (featuring Outlawz)	Shakur; J. Jackson; Beale; Cox	Johnny "J"	3:59
9.	"Thug N U Thug N Me" (featuring K-Ci & JoJo)	Shakur; J. Jackson; Peyton	Johnny "J"	4:29
10.	"Words 2 My First Born" (featuring Above the Law)	Shakur; David Blake; Big Simon; Sean Cole	DJ Quik	4:07
11.	"Let 'Em Have It" (Remix) (featuring Left Eye)	Shakur; Hutton; Hunter; Lisa Lopes	L.T. Hutton^{[a]}; Jamie Jones^{[b]}; Jason Pennock^{[b]}; Martin Kember^{[b]}	4:25
12.	"Runnin' on E" (featuring Outlawz)	Shakur; Fula; Washington, Jr.; Cooper III; Cole	2Pac	5:37
13.	"When I Get Free" (featuring J. Valentine)	Shakur; J. Jackson; Big Simon	Johnny "J"^{[a]}; Cold 187um^{[b]}	4:30
14.	"Until the End of Time" (RP Remix) (featuring Richard Page)	Shakur; J. Jackson; George; Lang; Page	Johnny "J"^{[a]}; Tone^{[b]}; Frank "Nitty" Pimentel^{[c]}; Jamel Edgerton^{[c]}	4:27
Total length:				58:59

Notes

- ^{^[a]} signifies the original producer.
- ^{^[b]} signifies a remixer.
- ^{^[c]} signifies a co-producer.
- "Fuck Friendz" contains background vocals by Tiffany Villarreal.
- "Until the End of Time" and "Until the End of Time (Remix)" contain background vocals by Anthem.
- "My Closest Roaddogz" contains background vocals by Shiro and Timothy.
- "Until the End of Time (Remix)" contains background vocals by R.L. Huggar.

== Personnel ==
Production and performance credits are adapted from the album liner notes.

Vocals

- 2pac – all tracks
- 6 Feet Deep – (track 1)
- Tiffany Villarreal – (track 2)
- Honey – (track 4)
- SKG – (track 4)

Instrumentation

Guitars

- Alfred Spanky – (track 25)
- Greg Dalton – (track 3)
- Marion Williams (track 4)

Bass

- Cornet Mims – (track 3)

Keyboards

- Cold 187um – (track 1)
- Ronnie king – (track 3)

Arrangement

- Cold 187um (track 1)
- Johnny J (track 3)

Technical

- Cold 187um – Mixing Engineer (tracks 1, 4)
- Keston Wright – Engineer (tracks 1, 4)
- Paul Smith – Engineer (track 1)
- Jamyz Hardy-Martin III – Assistant Engineer (tracks 1, 4)
- Brian Gardner – Mastering Engineer ( tracks 1, 3, 4)
- Claudio Cueni – Mixing Engineer (track 2), Digital Editor (track 2)
- Ian Boxill – Engineer (track 3), Mixing Engineer (track 3)
- Johnny J – Mixing Engineer (track 3)
- Jeff Burns – Assistant Engineer (track 3)
- Don Smartt – Assistant Engineer (tracks 2, 5, 7, 9, 10, 11, 14)
- Brian Springer – Mixing Engineer (track 4)

Production

- Johnny J – (track 1)
- QDIII – (track 2)
- L.T. Hutton – (track 4)

== Charts ==
=== Weekly charts ===
Chart (2001)	Peak position
Australian Albums (ARIA)	37
Australian Urban Albums (ARIA)	7
Austrian Albums (Ö3 Austria)	63
Belgian Albums (Ultratop Flanders)	6
Canadian Albums (Billboard)	2
Dutch Albums (Album Top 100)	10
French Albums (SNEP)	38
German Albums (Offizielle Top 100)	23
Irish Albums (IRMA)	25
New Zealand Albums (RMNZ)	24
Scottish Albums (Official Charts)	34
Swiss Albums (Schweizer Hitparade)	34
UK Albums (Official Charts)	31
UK R&B Albums (Official Charts)	2
US Billboard 200	1
US Top R&B/Hip-Hop Albums (Billboard)	1
US Top Rap Albums (Billboard)	1

=== Year-end charts ===
Year-end chart performance for Until the End of Time by Tupac Shakur
Chart (2001)	Position
Belgian Albums (Ultratop Flanders)	37
Canadian Albums (Nielsen SoundScan)	67
Canadian R&B Albums (Nielsen SoundScan)	15
Canadian Rap Albums (Nielsen SoundScan)	6
Dutch Albums (Album Top 100)	78
UK Albums (OCC)	146
US Billboard 200	40
US Top R&B/Hip-Hop Albums (Billboard)	9

Chart (2002)	Position
Canadian R&B Albums (Nielsen SoundScan)	114
Canadian Rap Albums (Nielsen SoundScan)	64

== Certifications ==
Region	Certification	Certified units/sales
Canada (Music Canada)	2× Platinum	200,000^{^}
United Kingdom (BPI)	Gold	100,000^{*}
United States (RIAA)	4× Platinum	4,000,000^{^}
^{*} Sales figures based on certification alone.^{^} Shipments figures based on certification alone.

== See also ==
- List of Billboard 200 number-one albums of 2001
- List of Billboard number-one R&B albums of 2001
