= Nu-Mixx Klazzics Vol. 2 =

Nu Mixx Klazzics Vol. 2

Remix album by 2Pac
- Released: August 14, 2007 (US)
- Genre: Hip-hop; rap rock
- Label: Death Row; Koch

2Pac chronology
Beginnings: The Lost Tapes 1988–1991 (2007)	Nu Mixx Klazzics Vol. 2 (2007)	Best of 2Pac (2007)

Professional ratings
Review scores
Source	Rating
AllMusic	link

Nu-Mixx Klazzics Vol. 2 – Evolution: Duets & Remixes is a remix album by American rapper Tupac Shakur. The album was released through Koch. It is the follow-up to Tupac Shakur's Nu-Mixx Klazzics, released previously on October 7, 2003. Its original title was Evolution: Duets & Remixes, and was released on August 14, 2007.

This release contains mostly remixes of recordings from two of his biggest selling albums, All Eyez on Me and The Don Killuminati: The 7 Day Theory. Hip-hop producer and rapper Daz Dillinger, Sha Money XL, and Street Radio were part of the record production.

== Track listing ==
No.	Title	Producer(s)	Length
1.	"Picture Me Rollin" (Kurupt, Butch Cassidy)	Street Radio, Bob Perry, Arnold Mischkulnig	3:39
2.	"Keep Goin'[Nu-Mixx]" (Hussein Fatal)	Street Radio	3:16
3.	"What'z Ya Phone # [Nu Mixx]" (Candy Hill)	Illmind	3:51
4.	"Starin' Through My Rear View" (Dwele)	Street Radio, Bob Perry, Arnold Mischkulnig	4:15
5.	"Hail Mary (Rock Remix)" (The Outlawz)	Ill Will Fulton	4:20
6.	"Got My Mind Made Up [Nu-Mixx]" (The Outlawz, Kurupt)	Street Radio, Bob Perry, Arnold Mischkulnig	5:12
7.	"Pain [Nu Mixx]" (Styles P, Butch Cassidy)	Black Jeruz	4:53
8.	"Lost Souls [Nu-Mixx]" (The Outlawz)	Street Radio, Bob Perry, Arnold Mischkulnig	4:37
9.	"Wanted Dead or Alive" (Snoop Dogg)	Jiggolo	3:03
10.	"Initiated [Nu-Mixx]" (Boot Camp Clik)	Jake One	3:46
11.	"How Do U Want It [Nu Mixx]"	BIGG E.D.I.	4:08
12.	"Picture Me Rollin'" (The Outlawz)	Claudio Cueni	5:10
13.	"Lost Souls'" (Best Buy Bonus track)" (Daz Dillinger & M-1 of Dead Prez)	Street Radio, Bob Perry, Arnold Mischkulnig	4:57
14.	"Initiated [Nu Mixx] (Best Buy Bonus Track" (Boot Camp Clik)	Street Radio	4:33
15.	"Pain (alternate remix)" (iTunes bonus track)" (Styles P, Butch Cassidy)	Street Radio	4:34

== Chart history ==
Album

Chart Positions	Peak position
U.S. Billboard 200	45
U.S. Billboard Top R&B/Hip Hop Albums	8
U.S. Billboard Top Independent Albums	2
