= Still Ballin' =

Single by 2Pac featuring Trick Daddy

from the album Better Dayz
- Released: May 21, 2003
- Recorded: December 18, 1995 (2Pac vocals): 2002 (remixed)
- Genre: Gangsta rap
- Length: 2:50
- Label: Interscope; Tha Row; Amaru Entertainment
- Songwriters: Tupac Shakur; Johnny Jackson; Francisco Pimentel; Maurice Young
- Producer: Nitty

2Pac singles chronology
"Thugz Mansion" (2002)	"Still Ballin'" (2003)	"Runnin' (Dying to Live)" (2003)

Trick Daddy singles chronology
"Thug Holiday" (2002)	"Still Ballin'" (2003)	"Round Here" (2003)

"Still Ballin'" is a song by American rapper Tupac Shakur from the 2002 posthumous album Better Dayz. The song was released as a promo single in 2003 and features Trick Daddy. It is part two of the song "Str8 Ballin'" from the album Thug Life Vol. 1. On the album, Better Dayz, the song is listed under the name "Still Ballin' (Nitty Remix)", due to the song not being the original version. The original version, produced by Johnny "J" and featuring Kurupt, was recorded in 1995 during the All Eyez on Me sessions and has never been officially released.

A different remix of "Still Ballin'" was made by DJ Fatal which features the original verses of both Tupac and Kurupt. Two of the verses from the original song are also featured on The Game's "How We Do" remix.

== Track listing ==
Credits adapted from the single's liner notes.

US promo single
No.	Title	Writer(s)	Producer(s)	Length
1.	"Still Ballin'" (clean version) (Nitty remix) (feat. Trick Daddy)	Tupac Shakur; Johnny Jackson; Francisco Pimentel; Maurice Young	Nitty	2:50
2.	"Still Ballin'" (instrumental) (Nitty remix)		Nitty	2:50
Total length:				5:40

=== Notes ===
- Suge Knight and Afeni Shakur were credited as executive producers for the single.

== Charts ==
"Still Ballin'" peaked in 2003 at #31 on the Billboard Top R&B/Hip-Hop Singles & Tracks chart, #15 on the Billboard Hot Rap Tracks chart, #24 on the Billboard Rhythmic Top 40 chart, and #69 on the Billboard Hot 100 chart.

=== Weekly charts ===
Chart (2003)	Peak position
US Billboard Hot 100	69
US Hot R&B/Hip-Hop Songs (Billboard)	31
US Hot Rap Songs (Billboard)	15
US Rhythmic Airplay (Billboard)	24

=== Year-end charts ===
Chart (2003)	Position
US Hot R&B/Hip-Hop Songs (Billboard)	100
