= Pac's Life =

Studio album by 2Pac
- Released: November 21, 2006
- Recorded: 1995–1996 (vocals: 2Pac & Yaki Kadafi) (production: "Soon As I Get Home"); 2005–2006 (production, guest vocals)
- Studio: Can-Am Studios (Tarzana, Los Angeles)
- Genre: West Coast hip-hop; gangsta rap; R&B
- Length: 55:06
- Label: Amaru; Interscope
- Producer: Swizz Beatz; Canei Finch; E.D.I.; Karma Productions; L.T. Hutton; QDIII; Salih; Sha Money XL; Tom Whalley

2Pac chronology
The Prophet Returns (2005)	Pac's Life (2006)	Beginnings: The Lost Tapes 1988–1991 (2007)

Singles from Pac's Life
- 1. "Untouchable" Released: February 27, 2006; 2. "Pac's Life" Released: October 21, 2006; 3. "Playa Cardz Right" Released: October 21, 2008

Pac's Life is the tenth and final studio album by American rapper 2Pac, as well as his sixth posthumous album, released on November 21, 2006 on Amaru Entertainment. The album debuted at number nine on the US Billboard 200 chart.

== Background ==
Shakur's vocals were recorded during his time spent on Death Row Records, excluding the two bonus tracks found on the UK and JP editions of the album. Of all the songs featured on the album, including the bonus tracks, only one song—"Soon As I Get Home"—is in its original, un-altered form, all others being remixes with updated beats and features. A broad range of artists contributed to the album, including Outlawz, Krayzie Bone, Snoop Dogg, Chamillionaire, Ludacris, A-3, Big Syke, Papoose, Keyshia Cole, Jay Rock, Young Buck, Ashanti, T.I., Lil Scrappy, Nipsey Hussle, three posthumous appearances by Kadafi, and Jamal Woolard, who became famous for portraying The Notorious B.I.G. in the 2009 biopic Notorious and in the 2017 biopic All Eyez on Me.

The album's title track and lead single features singer Ashanti and fellow rapper T.I. The two featured artists also participated in the filming of the song's music video, filmed at the Tupac Amaru Shakur Center for the Arts. The World Premiere of "Pac's Life" was on at 7:30 PM on BET's Access Granted on Wednesday, November 22. The video was also featured on BET's behind-the-scenes filming of "Pac's Life".

== Promotion ==
The album was recorded in Van Nuys, California. A week of events was conducted for the celebration of the release. It kicked off on Saturday November 11 at the Vaknin Gallery with "All Eyez On Me: Hip-Hop's Legendary Performers and Photographers," where photographers displayed their material. On Tuesday November 14, at the same venue, a VIP party previewing Pac's Life took place from 7:00pm – 10:00pm. The events were then shifted to the Tupac Amaru Shakur Center for the Arts (TASCA) where coat drives were held on Wednesday, November 15 and Friday, November 17 everyone who brought a winter coat received two admission tickets to the Pac's Life album release party. On Monday November 20, a "Pac's Life Teen Art" competition took place from 6-8 PM, where children ages 13–17 competed in an art exhibit contest.

== Critical reception ==
Professional ratings
Review scores
Source	Rating
AllMusic	2.5/5 stars
About.com	2.5/5 stars
Drowned in Sound	3/10
HipHopDX	3.5/5
Pitchfork	4.1/10
PopMatters	8/10
RapReviews	6.5/10
Rolling Stone	3/5 stars
Slant Magazine	2/5 stars

Reviews from critics and fans were mixed, with the general consensus being that while 2Pac's vocals were undoubtedly strong, the modern production sounded commercialized. AllMusic wrote: "This isn't to say that there is not some great material on Pac's Life, because there is ..., but the power of 2Pac's words is often lost behind the modern production ... and new verses from artists like Ludacris, Lil Scrappy, Ashanti, and Young Buck."

== Commercial performance ==
Pac's Life debuted at number nine on the US Billboard 200 chart, selling 159,000 copies in its first week. This became 2Pac's tenth US top-ten album and his seventh posthumous album to reach the top-ten.

== Track listing ==
No.	Title	Producer(s)	Length
1.	"Untouchable" (Swizz Beatz Remix) (featuring Krayzie Bone)	Swizz Beatz	4:16
2.	"Pac's Life" (featuring T.I. & Ashanti)	L.T. Hutton	3:38
3.	"Dumpin'" (featuring Hussein Fatal, Papoose & Carl Thomas)	Sha Money XL	4:27
4.	"Playa Cardz Right" (Female) (featuring Keyshia Cole)	Ivan "Orthodox" Barias & Carvin "Ransum" Haggins	4:33
5.	"What'z Next" (featuring A3 & Jay Rock)	Salih Williams	4:18
6.	"Sleep" (featuring Young Buck & Chamillionaire)	Sha Money XL	4:10
7.	"International" (featuring Nipsey Hussle & Young Dre)	Capital L.S	4:02
8.	"Don't Sleep" (featuring Lil' Scrappy, Nutso, Yaki Kadafi & Stormy)	E.D.I. Mean	3:36
9.	"Soon As I Get Home" (featuring Yaki Kadafi)	QD3	3:40
10.	"Playa Cardz Right" (Male) (featuring Ludacris & Keon Bryce)	Sha Money XL	4:54
11.	"Don't Stop" (featuring Big Syke, Yaki Kadafi, Hussein Fatal, E.D.I., Young Noble & Stormy)	L.T. Hutton	5:25
12.	"Pac's Life" (Remix) (featuring Snoop Dogg, T.I., Ashanti & Chris Starr)	L.T. Hutton	3:39
13.	"Untouchable" (featuring Yaki Kadafi, Hussein Fatal & Gravy)	Sha Money XL	4:25

UK Edition/iTunes Bonus Track
No.	Title	Producer(s)	Length
14.	"Dear Mama" (Remix) (featuring Anthony Hamilton)	Frank Nitty	5:42

Japanese Edition Bonus Track
No.	Title	Producer(s)	Length
15.	"Scared Straight"	Ivan "Orthodox" Barias & Carvin "Ransum" Haggins	3:29

== Charts ==
=== Weekly charts ===
Chart (2006–2007)	Peak position
Australian Albums (ARIA)	76
French Albums (SNEP)	83
German Albums (GfK)	71
Irish Albums (IRMA)	71
Japanese Albums (Oricon)	75
Swiss Albums (Schweizer Hitparade)	62
UK Albums (OCC)	90
UK R&B Albums (OCC)	11
US Billboard 200	9
US Top R&B/Hip-Hop Albums (Billboard)	3
US Top Rap Albums (Billboard)	3

=== Year-end charts ===
Chart (2007)	Position
US Billboard 200	124
US Top R&B/Hip-Hop Albums (Billboard)	43
US Top Rap Albums (Billboard)	21

== Certifications ==
Certifications for Pac's Life
Region	Certification	Certified units/sales
United Kingdom (BPI)	Silver	60,000^{‡}
^{‡} Sales+streaming figures based on certification alone.

== Release history ==
Country	Release date
Australia	November 18, 2006
Europe	November 20, 2006
United States	November 21, 2006
Japan	December 13, 2006
