= Until the End of Time (Tupac Shakur song) =

Single by 2Pac featuring R.L. Huggar

from the album Until The End Of Time
- Released: February 18, 2001
- Recorded: February 19, 1996 (2Pac's vocals), 1999 & 2000
- Genre: Hip hop; R&B
- Length: 4:26
- Label: Interscope; Amaru; Death Row
- Songwriters: Tupac Shakur; Johnny Jackson; Richard Page; Steve George; John Lang
- Producers: Johnny "J", Trackmasters

2Pac featuring R.L. Huggar singles chronology
"Who Do U Believe In" (1999)	"Until the End of Time" (2001)	"Letter 2 My Unborn" (2001)

Music video
- " Until the End of Time (Tupac Shakur song)" on YouTube

"Until the End of Time" is a posthumous single from the 2001 2Pac album of the same name. The song was very successful and was a big contributor to the album going 4× Platinum. The song features R.L. Huggar from the R&B group Next. An alternate version features Mr. Mister's lead singer and bassist Richard Page on vocals and bass. The music video for the song contains a compilation of unreleased footage of Shakur. It charted at #52 on the Billboard Hot 100.

== Composition ==
The song's instrumental is based on a sample of Mr. Mister's popular 1985 #1 song "Broken Wings".

== Title ==
The song itself was originally titled "Broken Wings", but was changed just a few weeks prior to its release, due to legal issues. However, it was still released as "Broken Wings" or "Broken Wings (Until the End of Time)" in some countries.

== Music video ==
The music video starts off with an interview which 2Pac had after his rape case. It includes unreleased footage of 2Pac recording and writing in a studio. The video also contains clips of music videos from his earlier singles such as "All About U".

== Track listing ==
- A1 Until The End Of Time (Clean Radio Edit)
- A2 Until The End Of Time (LP Version)
- B1 Until The End Of Time (Instrumental)
- B2 Until The End Of Time (Clean Radio Edit A Cappella)
- B3 Until The End Of Time (LP A Capella)

== Charts ==
=== Weekly charts ===
Chart (2001)	Peak position
Australia (ARIA)	34
Australian Urban (ARIA)	13
Austria (Ö3 Austria Top 40)	64
Belgium (Ultratop 50 Flanders)	3
Belgium (Ultratop 50 Wallonia)	6
Europe (European Hot 100 Singles)	10
France (SNEP)	39
Germany (GfK)	33
Ireland (IRMA)	8
Netherlands (Dutch Top 40)	13
Netherlands (Single Top 100)	11
Scotland Singles (OCC)	5
Sweden (Sverigetopplistan)	53
Switzerland (Schweizer Hitparade)	24
UK R&B (Official Charts Company)	3
UK Singles (OCC)	4
US Billboard Hot 100	52
US Hot R&B/Hip-Hop Songs (Billboard)	21

=== Year-end charts ===
Chart (2001)	Position
Belgium (Ultratop Flanders)	30
Ireland (IRMA)	53
Netherlands (Dutch Top 40)	76
Netherlands (Single Top 100)	71
UK Singles (Official Charts Company)	92
US Hot R&B/Hip-Hop Songs (Billboard)	86

== Certifications ==
Region	Certification	Certified units/sales
United Kingdom (BPI)	Silver	200,000^{‡}
^{‡} Sales+streaming figures based on certification alone.
