= Thugz Mansion =

Single by 2Pac featuring Nas and J. Phoenix

from the album Better Dayz
- Released: October 17, 2002
- Genre: Acoustic hip hop
- Length: 4:12
- Label: Amaru
- Songwriters: Tupac Shakur, Nasir Jones, J. Phoenix
- Producers: 7 Aurelius and Kon Artis (7" Remix version); A. Pittboss Johnson, Aulsondro "Novelist" Hamilton Emcee N.I.C.E., Claudio Cueni and Michael Herring (Acoustic Version)

2Pac singles chronology
"Letter 2 My Unborn" (2001)	"Thugz Mansion" (2002)	"Still Ballin'" (2003)

Nas singles chronology
"Made You Look" (2002)	"Thugz Mansion" (2002)	"I Can" (2003)

"Thugz Mansion" is a song by 2Pac, released as a posthumous single with two known popular versions both released on the 2002 album Better Dayz. It was nominated by the Source Awards for Single of the Year (Male Solo Artist).

== Overview ==
Thugz Mansion was 2Pac's depiction of a gangster's alternative to heaven. One of the most introspective and spiritual songs by 2Pac, this song talks about how he would rest in peace, and that he would eventually find happiness when he is in a place where all the troubles and pains of his life come to an end, and that he would want to end up in that place of peace after he dies; he also name-drops various figures of African American cultural history (namely: Marvin Gaye, Billie Holiday, Jackie Wilson, Sam Cooke, Malcolm X, Miles Davis) and recent political events (i.e., Latasha Harlins), all of whom he believed to be in heaven.

The track went on to become one of Tupac's biggest hits — Anthony Hamilton, who featured in one of the versions released in Better Dayz, said that Tupac lived through the song, whose message resonated even further due to his death. Saul Williams, who performed the lead role in the Broadway musical Holler If Ya Hear Me featuring music by Tupac, said that in the song's lyrics about seeking a final escape to a relentlessly violent reality, Tupac "raises a real question which I feel is extremely sincere, which is: if you are exposed to great levels of violence and poverty, how can you really be expected to even know how to make informed choices? Then people have these expectations of you of being peaceful. How can you expect me to be peaceful when I have no examples of peace working in my life?".

== Versions ==
Two remixes were released posthumously on the 2002 double album, Better Dayz. Disc 1 of the album features a remix listed as "Thugz Mansion-Nas Acoustic" which features fellow rapper Nas and singer J. Phoenix. Disc 2 of the album features a more tradition hip-hop remix and features singer Anthony Hamilton, this version was listed on the album as simply "Thugz Mansion" but it is known as the "7 Remix" due to it being remixed by producer, 7 Aurelius. The true original version, produced by Johnny "J", has never been officially released.

Multiple versions of the "Nas Acoustic" version have been released;

- "Outlawz Remix" which features Young Noble of the Outlawz, Nas, & J. Phoenix.
- "Thugz Mansion (N.Y.)" found on Nas' 2002 album, God's Son. This version has Tupac's second verse and Nas' verse switching places and Tupac's first verse replaced with a new verse by Nas.
- "Thugz Mansion (2Pac Original) Acoustic", which simply cuts out the verses delivered by Nas.

== Music video ==
A music video was shot for the "Nas Acoustic" version and features the featured artists Nas and J. Phoenix. The video was nominated at the 2003 MTV Video Music Awards for Best Rap Video.

== Track listing ==
1. "Thugz Mansion" - 7" Remix (Explicit)
2. "Thugz Mansion" - Nas Acoustic (Explicit)
3. "F*** Em All" (Explicit)

== Charts ==
=== Weekly charts ===
Chart (2002–2003)	Peak position
Australia (ARIA)	26
Australian Urban (ARIA)	11
Belgium (Ultratop 50 Flanders)	7
Belgium (Ultratop 50 Wallonia)	18
Germany (GfK)	74
Ireland (IRMA)	17
Netherlands (Single Top 100)	73
New Zealand (Recorded Music NZ)	10
UK Singles (Official Charts)	24
US Billboard Hot 100	19
US Hot R&B/Hip-Hop Songs (Billboard)	10
US Hot Rap Songs (Billboard)	4

=== Year-end charts ===
Chart (2003)	Position
US Billboard Hot 100	80
US Hot R&B/Hip-Hop Songs (Billboard)	53

== Certifications ==
Certifications for "Thugz Mansion"
Region	Certification	Certified units/sales
New Zealand (RMNZ)	2× Platinum	60,000^{‡}
^{‡} Sales+streaming figures based on certification alone.

== Release history ==
Region	Date	Format(s)	Label(s)	Ref.
United States	November 18, 2002	Rhythmic contemporary · urban contemporary radio	Amaru, Tha Row, Interscope	
