= Trapped (Tupac Shakur song) =

Single by 2Pac

from the album 2Pacalypse Now
- B-side: "Tha' Lunatic"
- Released: September 25, 1991
- Recorded: 1991
- Studio: Starlight Sound Studio (Richmond, California)
- Genre: Political hip-hop
- Length: 4:44
- Label: Interscope
- Songwriters: Tupac Shakur; Ramone Gooden; Ray Tyson
- Lyricist: Tupac Shakur
- Producer: Pee-Wee

2Pac singles chronology
"Same Song" (1991)	"Trapped" (1991)	"Brenda's Got a Baby" (1991)

Audio sample
- "Trapped": file; help

Music video
- "Trapped" on YouTube

"Trapped" is a political hip-hop song written and performed by American rapper 2Pac. It was released on September 25, 1991, through Interscope Records as the lead single from his debut solo studio album 2Pacalypse Now. Recording sessions took place at Starlight Sound Studio in Richmond, California. Production was handled by Ramone "Pee-Wee" Gooden, who utilised samples from the Bar-Kays's "Holy Ghost" and James Brown's "The Spank".

It deals with police brutality. The first verse tells a story of 2Pac being harassed by the police with one even shooting at him. He then fires back and says he did it because he was tired of constantly being profiled and abused by police officers.

The song was featured on 2Pac's 1998 posthumous Greatest Hits album.

== Music video ==
The music video features Shock G singing part of the song's chorus and depicts Shakur in jail. It features cameos by J-Dee of Da Lench Mob and Stretch. It was filmed on August 11, 1991.

It appeared as a bonus on the DVD for Tupac: Resurrection. Around the time the music video was debuting, Tupac was assaulted by the Oakland Police Department after he cursed at them for demeaning his name and prolonging the issuing of a ticket sustained during a jaywalking incident.

== Track listing ==
No.	Title	Writer(s)	Producer(s)	Length
1.	"Trapped" (LP Version)	Tupac Shakur; Ramone Gooden; Ray Tyson	Pee-Wee
2.	"Trapped" (Instrumental Mix)
3.	"The Lunatic" (LP Version)	Shakur; Gregory Jacobs	Shock G
4.	"The Lunatic" (Instrumental Mix)

== Personnel ==
- Tupac "2Pac" Shakur — lyrics, vocals
- Ramone "Pee-Wee" Gooden — producer, songwriter
- Raymond "Ray Luv" Tyson — songwriter
- Gregory "Shock G" Jacobs — backing vocals
- Dank — backing vocals
- Wiz — backing vocals
- Atron Gregory — executive producer
- Kevin Hosmann — art direction
- Victor Hall — photography
- Tom Whalley — A&R
