= Brenda's Got a Baby =

1991 single by Tupac Shakur

Single by 2Pac

from the album 2Pacalypse Now
- B-side: "If My Homie Calls"
- Released: October 20, 1991
- Recorded: 1991
- Genre: Conscious hip-hop
- Length: 3:55
- Label: Interscope; Jive
- Songwriters: Tupac Shakur; Deon "Big D the Impossible" Evans
- Producer: The Underground Railroad

2Pac singles chronology
"Trapped" (1991)	"Brenda's Got a Baby" (1991)	"If My Homie Calls" (1991)

Music video
- "Brenda's Got a Baby" on YouTube

Audio sample
- file; help

"Brenda's Got a Baby" is a song by American rapper 2Pac from his debut album, 2Pacalypse Now (1991). The song was first released as a promotional CD single a month prior to album's release and then, in February 1992, it was re-released as a double A-side single with the song "If My Homie Calls". The song, which features R&B singer Dave Hollister singing background vocals with Roniece Levias, is about a 12-year-old girl named Brenda who lives in a ghetto and has a baby she can't support. The song explores the issue of teen pregnancy and its effect on young mothers and their families. Shakur wrote the song while filming the feature film Juice, after reading a newspaper article about a 12-year-old girl who became pregnant by her cousin and threw the baby into a trash heap.

== Music video ==
The video of the song is in black-and-white. It was made to visualize what the rapper Shakur narrates. The first part shows Shakur and "Brenda" and then the actual story starts. Ethel "Edy" Proctor portrays Brenda.

The video begins with "based on a true story," although the characters themselves are fictitious (actors), Shakur wrote the song after reading a story in the newspaper of a 12-year-old girl getting pregnant by her cousin and trying to dispose of the baby in a trash can.

Parts of the video were included in Tupac: Resurrection, a 2003 documentary on 2Pac's life, in a television show later in the music video of "Ghetto Gospel", in the music video of "Changes" and appears as a bonus in its entirety on the film's DVD. Part of the video and song was played in 2Pac's biopic film, All Eyez on Me, released on June 16, 2017.

The video was filmed on January 7, 1992 and it was directed by the Hughes brothers. The music video was released on January 20, 1992.

== Legacy ==
In 2025, in his biography about Shakur, Jeff Pearlman detailed how the author had located both the baby referenced in the song (Davonn Hodge, now an adult) and Hodge's mother, which led to their reuniting that year. The child had been given up for adoption, and named by his mother beforehand.

== Charts ==
Chart (1992)	Peak position
US Hot Rap Songs (Billboard)	3
US Hot R&B/Hip-Hop Songs (Billboard)	23
