= Better Dayz =

Studio album by 2Pac
- Released: November 26, 2002
- Recorded: 1994–1996 (2Pac's vocals); 2001–2002 (production, guest vocals, and mixing)
- Genres: Hip hop; gangsta rap; West Coast hip hop; hardcore hip hop; R&B
- Length: 105:33
- Labels: Amaru; Tha Row; Interscope
- Producers: Afeni Shakur (exec.); Johnny "J"; Hurt-M-Badd; DJ Quik

2Pac chronology
Until the End of Time (2001)	Better Dayz (2002)	The Prophet: The Best of the Works (2003)

Singles from Better Dayz
- 1. "Thugz Mansion" Released: October 17, 2002; 2. "Still Ballin'" Released: May 21, 2003

Better Dayz is the eighth studio album and fourth posthumous album by the American rapper 2Pac. It is his last double album. It was released on November 26, 2002, debuting at number five on the US Billboard 200. The album is the second of two albums (the first being Until the End of Time) that consists of a collection of previously unreleased material by way of remixed songs from Tupac's "Makaveli" period while signed to Death Row Records, and was produced by Johnny "J", Jazze Pha, Frank Nitty, and E.D.I. Mean of Outlawz.

It includes "Military Minds" which features Boot Camp Clik members Buckshot and Smif-n-Wessun (credited as Cocoa Brovaz) which was supposed to be part of a collaborative album between Shakur and BCC titled One Nation but was never officially released due to Shakur's death. Better Dayz has no censored references to Death Row Records unlike the previous album, Until the End of Time. The only track on the album pre-Death Row era is "My Block (Remix)", which was recorded in 1994–1995 during Shakur's time with Interscope Records, and which the original version was released prior on the 1995 soundtrack album The Show. The songs ‘’Late Night’’ and "Who Do You Believe In" were also released previously on Death Row's 1999 compilation Chronic 2000. The song ‘’Late Night’’ is missing from all digital and streaming releases, as well as newer CD releases.

The album features appearances by Outlawz, Ron Isley, Nas, Mýa, Jazze Pha and Tyrese, among others. The hit single, "Thugz Mansion," has two versions: an acoustic version featuring Nas and J. Phoenix, which the music video is based on, and a hip hop version featuring Anthony Hamilton.

== Recording ==
The album features unreleased recordings from the 1994–1996 period, the majority of which are remixed tracks from Thug Life Volume 1, All Eyez On Me & The Don Killuminati: The 7 Day Theory. The album's other tracks retain their original form or are complete finished mixes, such as "Fuck 'Em All", "Late Night", "Ghetto Star", "Better Dayz", "Who Do U Believe In?" and "They Don't Give a Fuck About Us".

== Critical reception ==
Professional ratings
Review scores
Source	Rating
AllMusic	4/5 stars
Entertainment Weekly	C
HipHopDX	4/5
RapReviews	7.5/10
Rolling Stone	1/5 stars
Tom Hull – on the Web	B−

John Bush from AllMusic wrote: "Better Dayz shouldn't be overlooked [...] A lengthy two-disc set, it benefits from a raft of still-compelling material by one of the two or three best rappers in history, as well as excellent compiling by executive producers Suge Knight and Afeni Shakur, 2Pac's mother. Organizing the set roughly into one disc of hardcore rap and one of R&B jams makes for an easier listen, and the R&B disc especially has some strong tracks, opening with a remix of 1995's 'My Block' and including quintessentially 2Pac material—reflective, conflicted, occasionally anguished—like 'Never Call U Bitch Again,' 'Better Dayz,' 'Fame,' and 'This Life I Lead.' [...] It's 2Pac's best album since his death." Kludge magazine included it on their list of best albums of 2002. The track "Ghetto Star" has appeared on the soundtrack to the video game 25 to Life.

== Commercial performance ==
Better Dayz debuted at number five on the US Billboard 200 chart, selling 366,000 copies in its first week. This became 2Pac's eighth US top-ten album. In its second week, the album dropped to number eight on the chart, selling an additional 163,000 copies. As of September 2011, the album has sold 1,765,597 copies in the United States. On July 23, 2014, the album was certified triple platinum by the Recording Industry Association of America (RIAA) for sales of over three million copies.

In May 2003, the album was also certified triple platinum in Canada for sales of over 300,000 copies in Canada.

== Track listing ==
Disc 1
No.	Title	Producer(s)	Length
1.	"Intro"	7 Aurelius	0:56
2.	"Still Ballin'" (featuring Trick Daddy)	Original by Johnny "J", Remix by Nitty	2:50
3.	"When We Ride on Our Enemies"	Original by Johnny "J", Remix by BRISS	2:54
4.	"Changed Man" (featuring T.I. & Johntá Austin)	Original by Johnny "J", Remix by Jazze Pha	3:52
5.	"Fuck Em All" (featuring Outlawz)	Johnny "J"	4:26
6.	"Never B Peace" (featuring E.D.I. & Kastro of the Outlawz)	Original by Johnny "J", Remix by Nitty	4:59
7.	"Mama's Just a Little Girl" (featuring Kimmy Hill)	Original by Johnny "J", Remix by Kip "KP" Wilson	4:58
8.	"Street Fame"	Original by Daz Dillinger, Remix by BRISS	4:30
9.	"Whatcha Gonna Do" (featuring Kastro & Young Noble of the Outlawz)	Original by Johnny "J", Remix by E.D.I.	3:39
10.	"Fair Xchange" (featuring Jazze Pha)	Original by Johnny "J", Remix by Jazze Pha	3:52
11.	"Late Night" (from Chronic 2000 Still Smokin, featuring DJ Quik & Outlawz)	DJ Quik	4:18
12.	"Ghetto Star" (featuring Nutt-So)	Go-Twice	4:15
13.	"Thugz Mansion (Acoustic Version)" (featuring Nas & J. Phoenix)	Original by Johnny "J", Remix by A. "Pitboss" Johnson, Aulsondro "Emcee N.I.C.E." Hamilton, and Claudio Cueni	4:13
Total length:			45:23

Disc 2
No.	Title	Producer(s)	Length
1.	"My Block (Remix)"	Original by Easy Mo Bee, Remix by Nitty	5:22
2.	"Thugz Mansion" (featuring Anthony Hamilton)	Original by Johnny J, Remix by 7 Aurelius	4:07
3.	"Never Call U Bitch Again" (featuring Tyrese)	Johnny J	4:38
4.	"Better Dayz" (featuring Mr. Biggs)	Johnny J	4:17
5.	"U Can Call" (featuring Jazze Pha)	Original by Johnny J, Remix by Jazze Pha	3:49
6.	"Military Minds" (from The One Nation album, featuring Cocoa Brovaz & Buckshot)	Original by Darryl “Big D” Harper, Remix by E.D.I. Mean	5:29
7.	"Fame" (featuring Yaki Kadafi, Kastro, Napoleon & Young Noble from the Outlawz)	Hurt M Badd	4:50
8.	"Fair Xchange (Remix)" (featuring Mýa)	Original by Johnny J, Remix by Troy Johnson	3:56
9.	"Catchin Feelins" (featuring Muszamil & E.D.I., Napoleon & Young Noble from the Outlawz)	Original by Johnny J, Remix by E.D.I. Mean	4:54
10.	"There U Go" (featuring Yaki Kadafi, E.D.I. Mean, Kastro, Napoleon of the Outlawz, Big Syke & Jazze Pha)	Johnny J	5:30
11.	"This Life I Lead" (featuring Outlawz)	Johnny J	5:21
12.	"Who Do U Believe In" (from Chronic 2000 Still Smokin, featuring Yaki Kadafi from the Outlawz)	Johnny J	5:30
13.	"They Don't Give a Fuck About Us" (featuring Outlawz)	Johnny J	5:08
14.	"Outro"		0:13
Total length:			63:10

== Samples ==
- "Better Dayz"
  - "Let's Fall in Love (Parts 1 & 2)" by The Isley Brothers
- "Catchin' Feelins"
  - "Peter Piper" by Run-DMC
- "Late Night"
  - "Have Your Ass Home by 11:00" by Richard Pryor
  - "Wind Parade" by Donald Byrd
  - "Last Night Changed It All (I Really Had a Ball)" by Esther Williams
- "This Life I Lead"
  - "Naturally Mine" by Al B. Sure!
- "Who Do U Believe In"
  - "Manifest Destiny" from The Return of the Space Cowboy by Jamiroquai

== Personnel ==
- 2Pac – vocals
- Johnta Austin – featured artist
- Rob "Fonksta" Bacon – guest artist, guitar
- Bill Bennett – assistant engineer
- Big Syke – featured artist
- Ian Blanch – assistant engineer, engineer
- Warren Bletcher – assistant engineer
- Ian Boxill – engineer, mixing
- Leslie Brathwaite – engineer, mixing
- Briss – instrumentation, producer
- Buckshot – featured artist
- Coco Brothers – featured artist
- Courtney Copeland – background vocals
- Kevin Crouse – engineer
- Claudio Cueni – digital editing, engineer, mixing, producer
- Chris DeLaPena – assistant engineer
- DJ Quik – engineer, producer
- E.D.I. – featured artist, mixing, music supervisor, remixing
- Steve Fisher – assistant engineer
- Nanci Fletcher – featured artist
- G Mack – guitar
- Brian "Big Bass" Gardner – mastering
- A. Gobi – photography
- Anthony Hamilton – featured artist
- Darryl Harper – producer
- Kimmy Hill – featured artist
- Ronald Isley – guest artist
- Jazze Pha – featured artist, producer
- Johnny J – arranger, mixing, producer
- Troy Johnson – instrumentation, producer
- Kadafi – featured artist
- Kastro – performer
- Ronnie King – keyboards
- Suge Knight – executive producer
- Mr. Biggs – featured artist
- Chicu Modu – photography
- Molly Monjauze – project director
- Mussamill – featured artist
- James Musshorn – assistant engineer
- Mya – featured artist
- Napoleon – featured artist
- Nas – featured artist
- Duane Nettlesbey – composer
- Nutso – featured artist
- Outlawz – featured artist
- J. Phoenix – featured artist
- Frank Nitty Pimentel – drum programming, keyboards, producer
- Will Pyon – digital editing
- Chuck Reed – digital editing
- R.J. – bass, guitar
- 7 Aurelius – instrumentation, producer
- Afeni Shakur – executive producer
- Shorty B. – bass, guitar
- Dexter Simmons – mixing
- Alex Stiff – bass, guitar
- T.I. – featured artist
- Ellis Taylor – background vocals
- Trick Daddy – featured artist
- Tyrese – featured artist
- Mark Vinten – assistant engineer
- Corey Williams – assistant engineer
- Dwight DeLemond Williams – featured artist
- Jasmine Wilson – background vocals
- Keston Wright – engineer
- Young Noble – featured artist

== Charts ==
=== Weekly charts ===
Weekly chart performance for Better Dayz
Chart (2002–2003)	Peak position
Australian Albums (ARIA)	51
Canadian Albums (Billboard)	7
Canadian R&B Albums (Nielsen SoundScan)	3
Dutch Albums (Album Top 100)	36
French Albums (SNEP)	52
German Albums (Offizielle Top 100)	45
Irish Albums (IRMA)	40
New Zealand Albums (RMNZ)	20
Scottish Albums (Official Charts)	73
Swiss Albums (Schweizer Hitparade)	60
UK Albums (Official Charts)	68
UK R&B Albums (Official Charts)	7
US Billboard 200	5
US Top R&B/Hip-Hop Albums (Billboard)	1
US Top Rap Albums (Billboard)	1

=== Year-end charts ===
Year-end chart performance for Better Dayz
Chart (2002)	Position
Canadian Albums (Nielsen SoundScan)	91
Canadian R&B Albums (Nielsen SoundScan)	17
Canadian Rap Albums (Nielsen SoundScan)	8

Chart (2003)	Position
US Billboard 200	41
US Top R&B/Hip-Hop Albums (Billboard)	3

== Certifications ==
Region	Certification	Certified units/sales
Canada (Music Canada)	3× Platinum	300,000^{^}
United Kingdom (BPI)	Gold	100,000^{^}
United States (RIAA)	3× Platinum	3,000,000^{^}
^{^} Shipments figures based on certification alone.

== See also ==
- List of number-one R&B albums of 2002 (U.S.)
