= I Don't Give a Fuck =

Song by 2Pac featuring Pogo

from the album 2Pacalypse Now
- Released: November 12, 1991
- Recorded: 1991
- Genre: West Coast hip-hop; political rap; gangsta rap
- Length: 4:20
- Label: Interscope; East West
- Songwriters: Tupac Shakur; Pogo
- Producers: Pee-Wee; Raw Fusion

"I Don't Give a Fuck" is a protest song by American rapper 2Pac and the fourth track of his debut studio album 2Pacalypse Now (1991). The song, which features rapper Pogo, deals overtly with police brutality and racism. In the song, he narrates how the black community in the United States face harassment by racists, including police.

== Overview ==
In the intro, Tupac receives phone calls from one of his friends about the police beating them for no apparent reason and various crimes that are directed at them, after which he starts to rap. The theme of the song is strongly anti-racist and anti-police, and the lyrics tell about racism, such as store owners following him while he is just shopping, and crime in the ghetto.

This was one of the songs that a youth in Texas blamed for his shooting of a state trooper, as in the outro of the song, Tupac questions the authority for not dealing with these issues and he curses out the San Francisco Police Department, the Marin County Sheriff Department, CIA, the FBI, and then president George H. W. Bush in the spoken-word outro.

== In popular culture ==
The song was featured as a track on the in-game radio station Radio Los Santos in the original version of the 2004 video game Grand Theft Auto: San Andreas.
