= 2Pacalypse Now =

Studio album by 2Pac
- Released: November 12, 1991
- Recorded: September 1990 – October 1991
- Studio: Starlight Sound (Richmond, CA)
- Genres: Political rap; conscious rap
- Length: 55:07
- Labels: TNT; Interscope
- Producers: Atron Gregory (exec.); Big D the Impossible; J-Z; Live Squad; Pee-Wee; Raw Fusion; Shock G

2Pac chronology
2Pacalypse Now (1991)	Strictly 4 My N.I.G.G.A.Z... (1993)

Singles from 2Pacalypse Now
- 1. "Trapped" Released: September 25, 1991; 2. "Brenda's Got a Baby" Released: October 20, 1991; 3. "If My Homie Calls" Released: December 20, 1991

2Pacalypse Now is the debut solo studio album by American rapper 2Pac. It was released on November 12, 1991, through TNT Recordings and Interscope Records, while EastWest Records America, a division of Atlantic distributed the album. The recording sessions took place at Starlight Sound Studio in Richmond, California. The album was produced by the Digital Underground production team the Underground Railroad, made up of Big D the Impossible, Shock G, Pee-Wee, DJ J-Z, Raw Fusion, and Live Squad. It features contributions from Stretch, Angelique, Dave Hollister, Pogo, Poppi, Ray Luv and Shock G among others. The album's title is a reference to the 1979 war film Apocalypse Now.

In the United States, the album reached number 64 on the US Billboard 200, number 13 on the US Top R&B/Hip-Hop Albums and number three on both the Heatseekers Albums and Catalog Albums charts. On April 19, 1995, it was certified Gold by the Recording Industry Association of America for selling 500,000 or more copies. In commemoration of its twenty-fifth anniversary, it was re-released on vinyl and cassette on November 11, 2016, which peaked at number 21 on the Billboard Vinyl Albums chart.

The album produced three singles with accompanying music videos: "Trapped", "Brenda's Got a Baby" and "If My Homie Calls". The second single off of the album, "Brenda's Got a Baby", made it to number 23 on the Hot R&B/Hip-Hop Songs, number three on the Hot Rap Songs and number 55 on the Hot R&B/Hip-Hop Singles Sales. The song "I Don't Give a Fuck" from the album was included in 2004 video game Grand Theft Auto: San Andreas in-game radio station Radio Los Santos.

== Content ==
2Pacalypse Now is a socially conscious hip-hop album. It serves as the artist's commentary on contemporary social issues facing American society, such as racism, police brutality, poverty, gang violence, teenage pregnancy and drug abuse. The album poetically addresses black urban concerns relevant to the present day. Although a relatively tame album compared to Shakur's later works, 2Pacalypse Now was known for its violent lyrics aimed at police officers and the government in the songs "Trapped", "I Don't Give a Fuck" and "Soulja's Story".

== Controversy ==
The album generated significant controversy stemming from then-U.S. Vice President Dan Quayle's public criticism after Ronald Ray Howard murdered a Texas Highway Patrol trooper and his defense attorney claimed he was influenced by 2Pacalypse Now and its strong theme of police brutality. Quayle made the statement, "There's no reason for a record like this to be published. It has no place in our society".

== Critical reception ==
Professional ratings
Review scores
Source	Rating
AllMusic	3.5/5 stars
Q	4/5 stars
RapReviews	8/10
The New Rolling Stone Album Guide	3/5 stars
Tom Hull – on the Web	B+

2Pacalypse Now received generally positive reviews from critics. Although the album's political messages, lyrics and his storytelling were praised, Tupac Shakur's debut album was criticized for its production. In a retrospective review, RapReviews gave the album 4 stars out of 5 and said: "It's not an extraordinarily long album, but it is a dense and heavy listen that will take a lot out of you if you pay close attention to the persistent theme. The beats overall fail to make much of an impression, but perhaps that is as it should be, since nothing should be allowed to outshine this kind of lyrical performance. Tupac's vitriol is carried by his sincerity and charisma, both of which would emerge as key traits of the figure that blossomed in the years to come. Over the course of Tupac's career, the political got suffused by the personal and receded from the central position it occupied on his debut."

== Commercial performance ==
Upon its release, 2Pacalypse Now debuted at number 197 on the Billboard 200, number 77 on the Top R&B/Hip-Hop Albums and number 31 on the Heatseekers Albums charts in the United States. The album peaked at No. 64, No. 13 and No. 3 on the respective charts in the first third of 1992. The Recording Industry Association of America certified the album gold on April 19, 1995 for passing the sales mark of half a million copies.

After 2Pac's death in 1996, the album made it to the US Catalog Albums, peaking at number 3. It also made its charting debut on the UK Hip Hop and R&B Albums Chart, reaching number 35.

== Track listing ==
No.	Title	Writer(s)	Producer(s)	Length
1.	"Young Black Male"	Tupac Shakur; Deon Evans; George Clinton Jr.; Sylvester Allen; Harold Brown; Morris Dickerson; Lonnie Jordan; Charles Miller; Lee Oskar; Howard E. Scott	Big D the Impossible	2:35
2.	"Trapped"	Shakur; Ramone Gooden; Raymond Tyson	Pee-Wee	4:44
3.	"Soulja's Story"	Shakur; Evans; Isaac Hayes	Big D the Impossible	5:05
4.	"I Don't Give a Fuck" (featuring Pogo)	Shakur; Gooden	Pee-Wee	4:20
5.	"Violent"	Shakur; Ronald Brooks; David Elliott; Maceo Parker	Raw Fusion	6:25
6.	"Words of Wisdom"	Shakur; Gregory Jacobs; Herbie Hancock	Shock G	4:54
7.	"Something Wicked"	Shakur; Jeremy Jackson	J-Z	2:28
8.	"Crooked Ass Nigga" (featuring Stretch)	Shakur; Randy Walker	Live Squad	4:17
9.	"If My Homie Calls"	Shakur; Evans; Arlester Christian; Hancock	Big D the Impossible	4:18
10.	"Brenda's Got a Baby"	Shakur; Evans	Big D the Impossible	3:53
11.	"Tha' Lunatic" (featuring Stretch)	Shakur; Jacobs; Clinton Jr.; Ron Banks	Shock G	3:29
12.	"Rebel of the Underground"	Shakur; Evans	Shock G	3:17
13.	"Part Time Mutha" (featuring Angelique)	Shakur; Evans; Stevie Wonder	Big D the Impossible	5:13
Total length:				55:07

== Personnel ==
- Tupac "2Pac" Shakur – lyrics, vocals, co-producer
- Gregory "Shock G" Jacobs – background vocals (tracks: 2, 12), keyboards (track 8), producer
- Playa-Playa – outro vocals (track 2)
- Dank – outro vocals (track 2)
- Wiz – outro vocals (track 2)
- Mickey Cooley – telephone voice (track 4)
- Rodney Cooley – telephone voice (track 4)
- Pogo – telephone voice (track 4)
- Ronald "Money-B" Brooks – background vocals (track 5), producer
- David "DJ Fuze" Elliot – background vocals (track 5), producer
- Descaro "Mac Mone" Moore – background vocals (track 5)
- Ramon "Pee-Wee" Gooden – background vocals (track 7), producer
- Randy "Stretch" Walker – rap vocals (tracks: 8, 11)
- Dave Hollister – vocals (track 10)
- Roniece Levias – vocals (track 10)
- Raymond "Ray Luv" Tyson – background vocals (track 12)
- Yonni – background vocals (track 12)
- Di-Di – background vocals (track 12)
- Poppi – vocals (track 13)
- Angelique – background vocals (track 13)
- Deon "Big D the Impossible" Evans – producer
- Jeremy "J-Z" Jackson – producer
- Live Squad – producers
- Darrin Harris – engineering
- Steve Counter – engineering
- Marc Senasac – engineering
- Matt Kelley – engineering
- Kenneth K. Lee Jr. – mastering
- Atron Gregory – executive producer
- Kevin Hosmann – art direction
- Victor Hall – photography
- David Provost – photographic prints
- Tom Whalley – A&R
- Leslie Gerard-Smith – coordinator

== Charts ==
=== Weekly charts ===
Chart (1992)	Peak position
US Billboard 200	64
US Top R&B/Hip-Hop Albums (Billboard)	13
US Heatseekers Albums (Billboard)	3

Chart (1996)	Peak position
US Top Catalog Albums (Billboard)	3

Chart (1997)	Peak position
UK R&B Albums (Official Charts)	35

Chart (2016)	Peak position
US Vinyl Albums (Billboard)	21

=== Year-end charts ===
Chart (1992)	Position
US Top R&B/Hip-Hop Albums (Billboard)	39

== Certifications ==
Region	Certification	Certified units/sales
United States (RIAA)	Gold	500,000^{^}
^{^} Shipments figures based on certification alone.
