= Johnny "J" =

Mexican American songwriter, music producer and rapper

- Born: Johnny Lee Jackson; August 28, 1969; Ciudad Juárez, Chihuahua, Mexico
- Died: October 3, 2008 (aged 39); Los Angeles, California, U.S.
- Cause of death: Suicide by jumping from height
- Education: George Washington Preparatory High School
- Occupations: Record producer; rapper; songwriter
- Years active: 1989–2008
- Spouse: Capucine Cantrell (m. 1992)
- Children: 3
- Musical career
- Origin: Los Angeles, California, U.S.
- Genres: West Coast hip-hop; gangsta rap; G-funk
- Labels: Klockwork Entertainment Corp; Solar; Death Row Records; Epic

Johnny Lee Jackson (August 28, 1969 – October 3, 2008) was a Mexican-American multi-platinum songwriter, record producer, and rapper best known for his early career with Death Row Records, and for his work with 2Pac on Me Against the World and All Eyez on Me, as well as 2Pac's posthumously released albums. He was born in Juárez, Mexico, in 1969 and raised in South Los Angeles. Johnny "J" was co-owner and CEO of Klock Work Entertainment Corp.

== Early life ==
Johnny "J" was raised on 103rd and Budlong in South Los Angeles, by his adoptive parents. His father, John Sr., was a mechanic by trade who worked for the naval shipyards and now works for the U.S. Defense Department. His mother, Lidia, was a bilingual school teacher. His parents bought him a drum set as a kid, and allowed him to create a makeshift studio in their garage.

Johnny's interest in hip-hop escalated while he was at Washington Preparatory High School. He played on the drum line and hit it off with the aspiring rapper Candell "Candyman" Manson; future artists such as Yo-Yo, WC and Sir Jinx, of Da Lench Mob, and F. Gary Gray famed Director also attended Washington Prep around that time, where he played drums in the high school marching band and took music theory classes. Johnny was given a full scholarship to attend The Berklee College of Music (in Boston) wherein he received a full music scholarship, which he declined to accept, in the mid-1980s. After graduating high school in 1987, Johnny got his big break, producing "Knockin' Boots" for Candyman and his entire album "Ain't No Shame In My Game". The song went platinum and reached No. 9 on the Billboard Hot 100 in summer 1990, pushing Candyman's debut album, Ain't No Shame In My Game, into gold status. Johnny toured the world with Candyman until 1992.

Early in 1992, Johnny "J" married Capucine Cantrell. They have two children together named Zhani and Niamyja and one from a previous relationship, Malaysia. The two formed KLOCK WORK Entertainment together in 1995. They were married until his untimely death in 2008.

== Musical career ==
=== Early productions (1989–1992) ===
In early 1992, Big Syke, a member of 2Pac's group Thug Life introduced Johnny to 'Pac. They quickly gelled, recording "Thug Life" featuring Big Syke, "Pour Out a Little Liquor", for the Above the Rim soundtrack, and "Death Around the Corner," which would appear on Me Against the World. The partnership was derailed, though, when Tupac was sent to prison in February 1995. After his release that October, the pair reunited at Can-Am Studios in L.A.. Tupac felt very secure with him in the studio. 2Pac and Johnny J recorded more than a hundred songs together—11 of them, including "How Do U Want It" and "All About U", ended up on All Eyez on Me; the rest composed the bulk of 2Pac's posthumous work. Throughout producer Johnny J's career, he had sold over 100 million albums.

He produced his classmate Candyman's 1989 EP Hip Hop Addict and his 1990 single "Knockin' Boots" for his classmate Candyman's album Ain't No Shame in My Game, which went platinum thanks to the single. He also produced the early work of recording artist Shady Montage who eventually went on to become Shade Sheist.

=== Tupac Shakur, Death Row Records and solo album (1993–1996) ===
After the numerous nominations for Candyman, Johnny J met 2Pac and recorded nine tracks with him in three days. Following these recordings Johnny produced "Pour Out a Little Liquor" which appeared on the Above the Rim soundtrack and 2Pac's Thug Life album. The soundtrack eventually went Double Platinum and won the Soundtrack of The Year Award at the 1995 Source Awards.

Johnny produced the track "Death Around The Corner" which ended up on 2Pac's third solo album entitled Me Against The World. That album eventually went to the top of the Billboard 200.

Johnny J recorded and released his debut rap album I Gotta Be Me in 1994, which spawned two singles: "Get Away From Me" and "Dig Um' Out". A music video was shot for "Get Away From Me". Jackson produced the entire album, and even showcased his singing abilities on such tracks as "Love's the Way". The beat for "Better Off" would later be recycled for 2Pac's "Picture Me Rollin'" in his 1996 album All Eyez On Me. I Gotta Be Me is now out of print and hard to find.

After 2Pac's release in late 1995, the two began collaborating for 2Pac's Death Row Records debut All Eyez On Me. The double album was released early next year, and Johnny J produced the chart topping hits "All Bout U", "How Do U Want It" and "Life Goes On". He also produced "Thug Passion", "Shorty Wanna Be A Thug", "Wonda Why They Call U Bitch", "Run tha Streetz", "All Eyez on Me", "What'z Ya Phone #" and "Picture Me Rollin'"

The album is one of the most influential albums in hip hop history, and according to the RIAA, nine million copies of the album were sold in the United States alone by June 18, 1998.

According to 2pacworld.com, Johnny J. "co-wrote and helped produce 11 songs on All Eyez on Me and was never paid the $100,000 advance or the per song royalties of 3% he was supposed to receive." This financial dispute has led some to believe Death Row was somehow responsible for his death; preferring to have him killed than to pay royalties which would number in the millions because of the commercial success of 2Pac albums he helped produce.

=== Miscellaneous ventures (1997–2005) ===
Prior to Tupac Shakur's death Johnny produced over 150 tracks for the rapper, a great deal of them unreleased. Many of Johnny's collaborations with Shakur ended up being remixed for his posthumous releases such as "Until the End of Time", "Better Dayz", and "R U Still Down? (Remember Me)", while only a select few remained in their original form.

Johnny had composed a few music scores in such films as Gridlock'd. The first artist Johnny collaborated with after 2Pac's death was Bizzy Bone from Bone Thugs-n-Harmony. Johnny produced "Thugz Cry" and "Nobody Can Stop Me" off of the Heavenz Movie album, a release that went Platinum. In 2009 Klock Work Entertainment confirmed that Johnny produced a whole album for Bizzy, but was never released.

Along with Napoleon from the Outlawz and Val Young, Johnny released "Never Forget" in 2004, a tribute song to 2Pac. A music video was shot for the song, and includes many guest appearances from many of Shakur's close friends.

=== Final years (2006–2008) ===
In mid-2006, Johnny J premiered a ten-year anniversary Tupac tribute track on a charitable compilation by Mutulu Shakur entitled A 2Pac Tribute: Dare 2 Struggle. The song was written by a new artist working with Klock Work at the time named T-Jay.

In mid-2008, Iranian-Canadian rapper Imaan Faith collaborated with Deejay Ra to release Imaan's debut album Let The Truth Be Known on Universal Music Canada, featuring an opening track with Johnny J entitled "Goin 2 Da Top", which was recorded at Johnny's studio in California in mid-2006.

Johnny J had been recording for most of 2008 with actress/singer Tatyana Ali on her sophomore music album The Light.

== DUI arrest and death ==
On July 27, 2008, Johnny J was arrested in Los Angeles, California, and charged with driving while intoxicated. On October 3, 2008, imprisoned at Twin Towers Correctional Facility in Los Angeles, California while awaiting trial, Johnny allegedly jumped off an upper tier of the prison in an apparent suicide at about 6:45PM. He was found dead 45 minutes later, at the age of 39. According to Bay Area rapper King Tech, "If we could have just 10 minutes to talk, I think the outcome could have been different," Tech said of his friend's demise. "Unbelievable. The dude was set for life. With the amount of hits he has out, once you read his biography, the amount of songs he had was insane. It is really strange. Everybody is confused out here. Everybody I talk to are like, 'What?' He wasn't broke, publishing was coming in, he had a wife, he had two kids and a big house. He had everything. He didn't need to go."

== Discography ==
=== Solo album ===
- I Gotta Be Me (1994)

=== Produced songs ===
- Pour Out a Little Liquor - Thug Life (1994)
- Death Around the Corner - 2Pac (1995)
- All About U - 2Pac featuring Yaki Kadafi, Hussein Fatal, Nate Dogg and Snoop Doggy Dogg (1996)
- How Do U Want It - 2Pac featuring K-Ci & JoJo (1996)
- Life Goes On - 2Pac (1996)
- What’z Ya Phone # - 2Pac featuring Danny Boy (1996)
- Shorty Wanna Be a Thug - 2Pac (1996)
- Wonda Why They Call U B*tch - 2Pac featuring Michel’le (1996)
- Thug Passion - 2Pac featuring Dramacydal, Jewell, Storm & DJ Quik (1996)
- Picture Me Rollin’ - 2Pac featuring Danny Boy, Big Syke & CPO (1996)
- Check Out Time - 2Pac featuring Kurupt & Big Syke (1996)
- Hit 'Em Up - 2Pac featuring Outlawz (1996)
- Forever Ballin' - Big Syke & Johnny J (1996)
- Never Had a Friend Like Me - 2Pac (1997)
- Are You Still Down? - Jon B. featuring 2Pac (1997)
- Rap Hangover - Craig Mack featuring La Shawn Monet (1997); You! - Craig Mack (1997)
- U Bring Me Up (Remix) - K-Ci & Jo Jo (1997)
- Made Niggaz - 2Pac featuring Tha Outlawz (1997)
- Fake Ass Bitches; Ready 4 Whatever - 2Pac (1997)
- Crazy, Dangerous - Nate Dogg featuring Six Feet Deep and Nanci Fletcher (1998)
- Better Days (Video Version) - WC featuring Jon B. (1998)
- Thugz Cry - Bizzy Bone (1998); Nobody Can Stop Me
- Don't Sleep - Mark Wahlberg (1998)
- Troublesome ’96 - 2Pac (1998)
- U Can Be Touched; Still I Rise; Secretz of War - 2Pac (1999)
- Thugz Mansion - 2Pac featuring Nas and J. Phoenix (2002)

=== Featured single ===
- Vamos a Divertirnos - Gatos Verdes (1998)

=== 2pac songs, Unreleased or Posthumously Remixed Johnny "J" Productions ===
- "Lil' Homies" (Original Version)

Officially released on Until the End of Time (2001) with different production. Johnny J’s original, recorded circa 1996, circulates only in private collections.

- "Never Call U Bitch Again" (Original Version)

A Johnny J–produced version exists; the publicly known track on Better Dayz (2002) is remixed (featuring Tyrese). The true original still remains unreleased.

- "Happy Home" (Original Version)

Featured on Until the End of Time (2001) with substantial posthumous changes. Johnny J’s authentic arrangement was never officially issued.

- "Still Ballin’" (Original Version)

Appears on Better Dayz (2002) with a Trick Daddy feature and reworked beat. The 1996 Johnny J track is known among fans but not officially released.

- "When I Get Free" (Alternate Johnny J Mix)

Though a version appears on R U Still Down? (Remember Me) (1997), an earlier Johnny J mix from the All Eyez on Me sessions is rumored to exist. This variant isn’t on any official album.

- "Catchin’ Feelins" (Original Version)

The Better Dayz (2002) take was remixed posthumously. Johnny J’s raw production remains unreleased apart from low-quality leaks.

- "Niggaz Nature" (Johnny J Original)

A rumored outtake from 2Pac’s mid-90s sessions. Commonly bootlegged under variations of “Niggaz Nature” or “Thug Nature.” The fully authentic Johnny J mix is not on any official project.

- "LastOnesLeft" (Johnny J Original)

Though sometimes referenced in connection with Still I Rise (1999), the track did not appear on the final release. It’s rumored Johnny J produced an original version during the Outlaw Immortalz sessions, but only bootleg/collector versions exist.
