= What's the 411? Remix =

Remix album by Mary J. Blige
- Released: December 7, 1993
- Recorded: 1991–1993
- Genre: R&B; hip hop
- Length: 55:03
- Label: Uptown; MCA
- Producer: Tony Dofat; Teddy Riley; Eddie 'F' Ferrell; Darrin Whittington; Kenny Kornegay; Daddy-O; Tumblin' Dice; 3rd Eye; Mark Sparks; Dave Hall; Sean "Puffy" Combs; Devantè Swing

Mary J. Blige chronology
What's the 411? (1992)	What's the 411? Remix (1993)	My Life (1994)

Singles from What's the 411? Remix
- 1. "You Don't Have to Worry" Released: October 19, 1993; 2. "My Love" Released: May 28, 1994

Professional ratings
Review scores
Source	Rating
AllMusic	4.5/5 stars
Music Week	4/5 stars

What's the 411? Remix is a remix album by R&B singer Mary J. Blige, released on December 7, 1993, by Uptown Records and MCA Records. It is composed of remixed tracks from Blige's critically acclaimed debut album, and involved record producers and recording artists including Sean "Puffy" Combs, Teddy Riley, Eddie "F" Ferrell, Craig Mack, Heavy D, the Notorious B.I.G., and K-Ci Hailey. The album received favorable reviews, and debuted at number 118 on the Billboard 200, and number 22 on Billboard's Top R&B/Hip-Hop Albums chart.

== Track listing ==
No.	Title	Producer(s)	Length
1.	"Leave a Message" (featuring The Notorious B.I.G., Puff Daddy, K-Ci Hailey, Martin Lawrence, Redman, and Tim "Buttnaked" Dawg)	Tony Dofat	3:38
2.	"You Don't Have to Worry" (featuring Craig Mack)	Eddie 'F' Ferrell, Darrin Whittington, Kenny Kornegay	4:38
3.	"My Love" (featuring Heavy D)	Teddy Riley	7:13
4.	"Real Love (Remix)" (featuring The Notorious B.I.G.)	Daddy-O	4:47
5.	"What's the 411?" (featuring K-Ci Hailey and The Notorious B.I.G.)	Tumblin' Dice	4:54
6.	"Reminisce" (featuring C.L. Smooth)	Jesse West	5:11
7.	"Mary & Andre" (featuring Andre Harrell)	Tim Dawg	0:27
8.	"Sweet Thing"	Mark Sparks	3:43
9.	"Love No Limit" (featuring Kid Capri, K-Ci Hailey)	Daddy-O	4:04
10.	"You Remind Me" (featuring Greg Nice of Nice & Smooth)	Dave Hall, Sean "Puffy" Combs	5:56
11.	"Changes I've Been Going Through"	Teddy Riley	4:31
12.	"I Don't Want to Do Anything" (featuring K-Ci Hailey)	DeVante Swing	6:01
Total length:			55:03

Sample credits

- "Real Love (Remix)" contains a sample of "Superman Theme" as performed by Leon Klatzkin, "Clean Up Woman" as performed by Betty Wright, "Hihache" as performed by Lafayette Afro Rock Band, and "So Wat Cha Sayin'" as performed by EPMD.
- "Love No Limit (Puffy's Remix)" contains a sample of "Risin' to the Top" as performed by Keni Burke.
- "You Don't Have to Worry (Remix Main with Rap)" contains a sample of "Ode to Billie Joe" as performed by Lou Donaldson.
- "What's the 411? (Remix)" contains a sample of "Superman Lover" as performed by Johnny "Guitar" Watson, and a portion of The Notorious B.I.G.'s "Just Playing (Dreams)".
- "Reminisce (Bad Boy Remix)" contains a sample of "New Generation" as performed by The Classical Two and "They Reminisce Over You (T.R.O.Y.)" as performed by Pete Rock & C.L. Smooth.

== Charts ==
=== Weekly charts ===
Chart (1993)	Peak position
US Billboard 200	118
US Top R&B/Hip-Hop Albums (Billboard)	22

=== Year-end charts ===
Chart (1994)	Position
US Top R&B/Hip-Hop Albums (Billboard)	75

== Certifications ==
Region	Certification	Certified units/sales
United States (RIAA)	Gold	500,000^{^}
^{^} Shipments figures based on certification alone.
