= List of hip-hop musicians from New York City =

This is a list of American hip-hop musicians from New York City, New York.

== 0–9 ==
- 2Pac
- 3rd Bass
- 4th Disciple
- 40 Cal.
- 50 Cent
- 6ix9ine
- 60 Second Assassin
- 88-Keys
- 9th Prince

== A ==
- A.D.O.R.
- A Boogie wit da Hoodie
- A Tribe Called Quest
- Action Bronson
- Ad-Rock
- Aesop Rock
- Afrika Baby Bam
- Afrika Bambaataa
- Afu-Ra
- Agallah
- Akinyele
- AKTHESAVIOR
- Ali Shaheed Muhammad
- All City
- Amil
- Andy Mineo
- Angie Martinez
- Antoinette
- A$AP Ferg
- A$AP Mob
- A$AP Nast
- A$AP Rocky
- A$AP Twelvyy
- A$AP TyY
- A$AP Yams
- Ashok Kondabolu
- Astro
- Audio Two
- Awkwafina
- AZ
- Azealia Banks

== B ==
- Bas
- The Beastie Boys
- Beatnuts
- Big Ali
- Big Bank Hank
- Big Body Bes
- Big Daddy Kane
- Big L
- Big Noyd
- Big Pun
- Big Tigger
- Bigg Jus
- Bishop Nehru
- Biz Markie
- Black Market Militia
- Black Moon
- Black Rob
- Black Sheep
- Black Star
- Blaq Poet
- Blinky Blink
- Bobby Shmurda
- Bodega Bamz
- The Bomb Squad
- Boogie Down Productions
- Boot Camp Clik
- Brand Nubian
- Breez Evahflowin'
- Bronx Style Bob
- Brother J
- Buckshot
- Buckwild
- Buff Love
- Busta Rhymes
- Busy Bee Starski

== C ==
- C-Rayz Walz
- Cage
- Cam'ron
- Camp Lo
- Canibus
- Cannibal Ox
- Capital STEEZ
- Capone
- Cappadonna
- Cardi B
- Caushun
- Ced-Gee
- Cella Dwellas
- Channel Live
- Charles Hamilton
- Chaundon
- Cheno Lyfe
- Chi Ali
- Children of the Corn
- Chinx
- Chris Rolle
- Christopher Martin
- Christopher Reid
- Chubb Rock
- Chuck D
- CJ Fly
- CL Smooth
- Coke La Rock
- Conceited
- Consequence
- Cool Calm Pete
- Cormega
- Cory Gunz
- Craig G
- Craig Mack
- Crooklyn Dodgers
- Cuban Link

== D ==
- D.M.C.
- D-Nice
- Da Beatminerz
- Da Bush Babees
- Da King & I
- Daddy-O
- Dai Burger
- Dana Dane
- Danny Boy
- Das EFX
- Das Racist
- Dave East
- David Stones
- Davy DMX
- De La Soul
- dead prez
- Deadly Venoms
- Def Jef
- Def Squad
- Desiigner
- Diamond D
- Digable Planets
- Diggin' in the Crates Crew
- Diggy Simmons
- The Diplomats
- Disco King Mario
- DJ Clue?
- DJ Cocoa Chanelle
- DJ Envy
- DJ Green Lantern
- DJ Hurricane
- DJ Kay Slay
- DJ Lord
- DJ Muggs
- DJ Richie Rich
- DJ Scratch
- DJ Skribble
- DJ Spinderella
- DJ Spinna
- DJ Subroc
- DJ Whoo Kid
- DMX
- Donny Goines
- Doug E. Fresh
- Dr. Jeckyll & Mr. Hyde
- Drag-On
- Dres
- Dthang
- Duke Bootee
- DukeDaGod
- Dyme-A-Duzin

== E ==
- E.D.I. Mean
- Ed Lover
- El-P
- Emilio Rojas
- EPMD
- Eric B. & Rakim
- Eric Booker
- Erick Arc Elliott
- Erick Sermon
- Everlast

== F ==
- Fab Five Freddy
- Fabolous
- The Fat Boys
- Fat Joe
- Father MC
- The Firm
- Fivio Foreign
- Flatbush Zombies
- Flatlinerz
- Flava Flav
- Flipp Dinero
- Flowsik
- Foxy Brown
- Freaky Tah
- Freddie Foxxx
- Fredro Starr
- Freekey Zekey
- French Montana
- Frenchie
- Fu-Schnickens
- Funky 4 + 1

== G ==
- G. Dep
- G-Unit
- Gang Starr
- Gary G-Wiz
- Gawvi
- Ghostface Killah
- Godfather Don
- GP Wu
- Grafh
- Grand Daddy I.U.
- Grand Puba
- Grand Wizzard Theodore
- Grandmaster Caz
- Grandmaster Flash
- Grandmaster Flash and the Furious Five
- Grandwizard Theodore & the Fantastic Five
- Grap Luva
- Gravediggaz
- Group Home
- GZA

== H ==
- Haas G
- Hak
- Hanz On
- Havoc
- Heavy D
- Heems
- Hell Razah
- Hell Rell
- Heltah Skeltah
- Hoodie Allen
- Homeboy Sandman
- The HRSMN
- Hurricane G

== I ==
- Ilacoin
- Ill Al Skratch
- Ill Bill
- Immortal Technique
- Infamous Mobb
- InI
- Inspectah Deck
- Islord
- Issa Gold
- Ice Spice

== J ==
- J-Live
- J-Zone
- J.R. Writer
- J57
- Ja Rule
- Jadakiss
- Jae Millz
- Jam Master Jay
- Janine Gordon
- Jared Evan
- Jarobi White
- Jay Critch
- Jay-Z
- Jaz-O
- Jean Grae
- Jemini the Gifted One
- Jennifer Lopez
- Jeru the Damaja
- Jesse West
- Jigmastas
- Jim Jones
- Jipsta
- Joe Budden
- Joell Ortiz
- Joey Bada$$
- JPEGMafia
- Juelz Santana
- Juice Crew
- Jumz
- Juggaknots
- Junglepussy
- Jungle Brothers
- Junior M.A.F.I.A.
- Just-Ice

== K ==
- K-Solo
- K. Sparks
- K7
- Ka
- Kangol Kid
- Kastro
- Keith Murray
- Keith Shocklee
- Kid Capri
- Kid 'n Play
- Killa Sin
- Killah Priest
- Killarmy
- Kinetic 9
- Kirk Knight
- KMD
- Koncept
- Kool A.D.
- Kool DJ Herc
- Kool G Rap
- Kool Keith
- Kool Moe Dee
- Kovas
- KRS-One
- Kurious
- Kurtis Blow
- Kurtis Mantronik
- Kwamé
- Kyle Rapps

== L ==
- The Lox
- La Coka Nostra
- La the Darkman
- Large Professor
- Leaders of the New School
- Le1f
- Lex "The Hex" Master
- Lexa Gates
- Lil' Cease
- Lil' Kim
- Lil Mama
- Lin Que
- LL Cool J
- Lloyd Banks
- Loon
- Lord Finesse
- Lord Jamar
- Lord Tariq and Peter Gunz
- Lordz of Brooklyn
- Lost Boyz
- Louieville Sluggah
- Louis Logic
- Lovebug Starski
- Lumidee
- Lil Tecca
- Lil Tjay

== M ==
- M.O.P.
- M-1
- Main Source
- Maino
- Mantronix
- Mariah Carey
- Marley Marl
- Mary J. Blige
- Mase
- Maseo
- Masta Ace
- Masta Ace Incorporated
- Masta Killa
- Mathematics
- Max B
- MC Jazzy Jeff
- MC Lyte
- MC Serch
- MC Shan
- MC Tee
- MCA
- McGruff
- MeccaGodZilla
- Meechy Darko
- Melle Mel
- Memphis Bleek
- Method Man
- Meyhem Lauren
- MF Doom
- MF Grimm
- Mic Geronimo
- Michael Peace
- Mickey Factz
- Mike D
- Mims
- Mister Cee
- Mobb Deep
- Monsta Island Czars
- Mopreme Shakur
- Mos Def
- Mr. Cheeks
- Mr. Len
- Mr. Magic
- Mr. Muthafuckin' eXquire
- Mr. V
- Ms. Melodie
- Myzery

== N ==
- N.O.R.E.
- Nas
- Native Tongues
- Nature
- Necro
- Never Yet Contested
- Newcleus
- Nice & Smooth
- Nicki Minaj
- Nine
- Nitty
- Njena Reddd Foxxx
- The Notorious B.I.G.
- NYOIL

== O ==
- O.C.
- O.G.C.
- Ol' Dirty Bastard
- Omar Epps
- Onyx
- Organized Konfusion
- Overweight Pooch

== P ==
- PackFM
- Papoose
- Paul C
- Pepa
- Percee P
- Pete Nice
- Pete Rock
- Pete Rock & CL Smooth
- Petey Pablo
- Pharoahe Monch
- Phife Dawg
- PMD
- Polyrhythm Addicts
- Pop Smoke
- Posdnuos
- Positive K
- Pras
- Prince Markie Dee
- Prince Paul
- Prince Po
- Pro Era
- Prodigal Sunn
- Prodigy
- Professor Griff
- Professor X the Overseer
- Prospect
- Public Enemy
- Pumpkinhead

== Q ==
- Q-Tip
- Q-Unique
- Queen Pen
- Quesedilla

== R ==
- R.A. the Rugged Man
- Ra Diggs
- Raekwon
- Rahzel
- Rakim
- Rammellzee
- Rampage
- Ratking
- Rayne Storm
- Rebel Diaz
- Red Café
- Redrum
- Reek da Villian
- Remedy
- Remy Ma
- Representativz
- Rich the Kid
- Rob Base & DJ E-Z Rock
- Rob Sonic
- Rob Swift
- Roc Marciano
- Roc Raida
- Rock
- Ron Browz
- Roxanne Shante
- Royal Flush
- Rev. Run
- Run-DMC
- Ruste Juxx
- RZA

== S ==
- Sabor Latino
- Sadat X
- Saigon
- Salt
- Salt-N-Pepa
- Sammus
- Sauce Money
- Saul Williams
- Scott La Rock
- Sean Combs
- Sean Price
- Sean Slaughter
- Sensational
- Sensato del Patio
- Sha Stimuli
- Shabaam Sahdeeq
- Shabazz the Disciple
- Shawn Pen
- Sheek Louch
- Shock G
- Showbiz and A.G.
- Shyheim
- Shyne
- Silkski
- Sirah
- Sister Souljah
- Skizzy Mars
- Skyzoo
- Slick Rick
- Smif-n-Wessun
- Smoke DZA
- Smokin' Suckaz wit Logic
- Smoothe da Hustler
- Sonny Seeza
- Special Ed
- Special K
- Spliff Star
- Spoonie Gee
- Spot
- Spyder-D
- Starang Wondah
- Steele
- Stetsasonic
- Sticky Fingaz
- Streetlife
- Stretch
- Stro
- Styles P
- Sunz of Man
- Supernatural
- Supreme
- Sutter Kain
- Sweet Tee
- Swizz Beatz

== T ==
- T La Rock
- Talib Kweli
- Tek
- Terminator X
- Terror Squad
- The Notorious B.I.G
- Theodore Unit
- Theophilus London
- Tim Dog
- Timbo King
- Tony Sunshine
- Tony Touch
- Tony Yayo
- Too Poetic
- Top Dog
- Top Quality
- Torae
- Torch
- Tragedy Khadafi
- Treacherous Three
- Trife Diesel
- Trigga the Gambler
- Tristan Wilds
- Troy Ave
- Tru-Life
- Trugoy

== U ==
- U-God
- Ultramagnetic MCs
- UMC's
- Uncle Murda
- The Underachievers
- UTFO
- Uncle Louie

== V ==
- Vado
- Vast Aire
- Vinny Cha$e
- Vordul Mega

== W ==
- Warp 9
- The Weathermen
- Whodini
- Wise
- Wonder Mike
- Wu-Elements
- Wu-Tang Clan

== X ==
- Xaviersobased
- The X-Ecutioners
- X Clan

== Y ==
- Yak Ballz
- YC the Cynic
- YG'z
- Young Black Teenagers
- Young M.A
- Young MC
- Your Old Droog

== Z ==
- Zebra Katz
- Zombie Juice

== See also ==
- List of people from New York City
- List of hip-hop musicians
