= Horace Brown (album) =

Studio album by Horace Brown
- Released: June 18, 1996
- Studios: Giant Recording (New York City); Daddy's House Recording (New York City); Caribbean Sound Basin (Port of Spain, Trinidad); Sony Music (New York City); Soundtrack (New York City); DMH (Elmsford, New York); Platinum Island (New York City); Reflections (New York City); Unique Recording (New York City)
- Genre: R&B
- Length: 54:13
- Label: Motown
- Producers: Big Bub; Charles Farrar; Dave "Jam" Hall; DeVante Swing; Dr. Ceuss; Eddie F; Kevin Deane; Puff Daddy; Stevie J; Troy Taylor

Singles from Horace Brown
- 1. "Taste Your Love" Released: September 6, 1994; 2. "One for the Money" Released: March 26, 1996; 3. "Things We Do for Love" Released: June 25, 1996; 4. "How Can We Stop" Released: October 22, 1996

Professional ratings
Review scores
Source	Rating
AllMusic	3/5 stars

Horace Brown is the only studio album by American contemporary R&B singer Horace Brown. It was released on June 18, 1996, via Motown Records. Recording sessions took place at Giant Recording Studios, Daddy's House Recording Studios, Sony Music Studios, Soundtrack Studios, Platinum Island Studios, Reflections Studio and Unique Recording Studios in New York City, Caribbean Sound Basin in Port of Spain, and DMH Studios in Elmsford. Production was handled by Dave "Jam" Hall, Puff Daddy, Stevie J, Big Bub, Charles Farrar, DeVante Swing, Dr. Ceuss, Kevin Deane, Troy Taylor, and DJ Eddie F, who also served as executive producer together with Andre Harrell and Lewis Tillman. It features a lone guest appearance from Faith Evans.

In the United States, the album debuted at number 145 on the Billboard 200, number 18 on the Top R&B Albums and number 8 on the Heatseekers Albums charts. It found more success charting in the United Kingdom, debuting at number 48 on the UK Albums Chart and number 8 on the Official Hip Hop and R&B Albums Chart.

== Singles ==
The album's lead single "Taste Your Love" was originally released on September 6, 1994, through Uptown/MCA Records. The song's subject, which is oral sex, spurred controversy and was banned in several Southern United States. However, the single made it to No. 38 on the Hot R&B Songs chart domestically and No. 58 on the UK singles chart, No. 9 on the Dance Singles Chart and No. 14 on the Hip Hop and R&B Singles Chart in the UK.

The song "Just Let Me Know", released as a promotional single in 1995, marks Brown's final release for Uptown/MCA Records as the label shelved his then-upcoming full-length project.

Through Andre Harrell, Brown moved to Motown Records with the song "One for the Money", released on March 26, 1996, via Motown. The single remains Brown's biggest hit single to date, reaching No. 62 on the Billboard Hot 100 and No. 14 on the Hot R&B Songs in the US, No. 12 on the UK singles chart, No. 11 on the Dance Singles Chart and No. 3 on the Hip Hop and R&B Singles Chart in the UK, and also No. 48 on the Swedish (Sverigetopplistan) singles charts. The single includes remixes done by DJ Clark Kent featuring Foxy Brown and "Buttnaked" Tim Dawg featuring the Lost Boyz.

The third single off of the album, "Things We Do for Love", was released one week after the LP and become Brown's final single to appear on national music charts, peaking at No. 95 on the Billboard Hot 100 and No. 40 on the Hot R&B Songs in the US, and No. 27 on the UK singles chart, No. 12 on the Dance Singles Chart and No. 6 on the Hip Hop and R&B Singles Chart in the UK. The remix version of the song features American rapper Jay-Z.

The fourth and final single from the album, "How Can We Stop", was released on October 22, 1996, reaching No. 77 on the Hot R&B Songs in the US.

Songs "Why Why Why" and "I Want You Baby" were also released as promotional singles, but failed to chart.

== Track listing ==
Horace Brown track listing
No.	Title	Writer(s)	Producer(s)	Length
1.	"Why Why Why"	Horace Brown; Chad Elliott; James Wright	Dr. Ceuss	5:00
2.	"How Can We Stop" (featuring Faith Evans)	Brown; Sean Combs; Steven Jordan	Puff Daddy; Stevie J	5:39
3.	"Things We Do for Love"	Brown; Edward Ferrell	DJ Eddie F	4:57
4.	"I Want You Baby"	Brown; Tara Geter-Tillman; Combs; Jordan; William Lee Nichols; Allen J. Williams; Cameron Gipp; Thomas Callaway; Willie Knighton; Robert Barnett; Organized Noize	Puff Daddy; Stevie J; D-Dot (co.)	4:30
5.	"One for the Money"	Brown; Kevin Deane; Bakardi D. Wildcat; Craig Mack; Osten Harvey; R. Ortiz	Kevin Deane	4:24
6.	"Taste Your Love"	Brown; Tim Patterson; Dave Hall	Dave "Jam" Hall	4:45
7.	"Trippin'"	Brown; Frederick Lee Drakeford; Joseph Jackson Jr.; Burt Bacharach; Hal David	Big Bub; Butch Whip (ass.)	4:15
8.	"I Like"	Brown; James Earl Jones Jr.; Hall	Dave "Jam" Hall	5:49
9.	"Just Let Me Know"	Brown; Geter-Tillman; Charles Farrar; Troy Taylor	The Characters; Horace Brown (co.)	4:32
10.	"Gotta Find a Way"	Brown; Geter-Tillman; Hall	Dave "Jam" Hall	5:39
11.	"You Need a Man"	Brown; Donald Earle DeGrate Jr.	DeVante Swing	4:43
Total length:				54:13

Sample credits

- Track 4 contains elements from "If You Don't Turn Me On" performed by B. T. Express and replayed elements from "Cell Therapy".
- Track 5 contains samples from "Flava in Ya Ear" as recorded by Craig Mack and "7 Mo Beats to Break/Old Days".
- Track 6 contains a sample from "Word to the Conscious" performed by Cookie Crew.
- Track 7 contains elements from "The Look of Love" performed by Isaac Hayes.

== Personnel ==
- Horace Brown – lyrics (tracks: 1–6, 8–11), vocals, composer (track 1), vocal arrangement (tracks: 1, 3, 5, 6, 8–10), co-producer (track 9)

Guest musicians

- Chad "Dr. Ceuss" Elliott – keyboards, composer & producer (track 1), drum programming (tracks: 1, 11)
- Lamar Mitchell – additional keyboards (track 1)
- James "Big Jim" Wright – composer (track 1)
- Kevin Thomas – recording (track 1)
- Prince Charles Alexander – mixing (tracks: 1, 6, 11), recording (tracks: 6, 10, 11)
- Chris Hilt – engineering assistant (track 1)
- Faith Evans – vocals (track 2)
- Sean "Puffy" Combs – composer and producer (tracks: 2, 4)
- Steven "Stevie J." Jordan – producer (tracks: 2, 4)
- Axel Niehaus – recording (tracks: 2, 4), mixing (track 4)
- Tony Maserati – mixing (tracks: 2, 4), recording (track 4)
- Edward "DJ Eddie F." Ferrell – keyboards, composer & producer (track 3); executive producer
- Tim Shider – keyboards (track 3)
- Chris Theis – mixing (track 3), recording (track 7)
- Rob Paustian – vocal tracking (track 3), mixing (track 8)
- Jason DeCosta – music tracking (track 3)
- Tara Geter-Tillman – lyrics (tracks: 4, 9, 10)
- 112 – backing vocals (track 4)
- Kelly Price – backing vocals (track 4)
- Deric "D-Dot" Angelettie – co-producer (track 4)
- Sean Poland – recording assistant (track 4)
- Kevin Deane – keyboard and drum programming, composer, producer & recording (track 5)
- Bakardi D. Wildcat – composer (track 5)
- Mario Rodriguez – mixing (tracks: 5, 9), recording (track 9)
- Andrew Page – mixing assistant (track 5)
- Tim "Buttnaked Tim Dawg" Patterson – lyrics (track 6)
- Dave "Jam" Hall – keyboard and drum programming, composer & producer (tracks: 6, 8, 10), recording (track 8)
- Frederick Lee "Big Bub" Drakeford – backing vocals, keyboards, producer & mixing (track 7)
- Joya Owens – backing vocals (track 7)
- Joseph "Butch Whip" Jackson Jr. – associate producer (track 7)
- Tom Jefferson – mixing (track 7)
- Tony Rivera – recording assistant (track 7)
- James Earl Jones Jr. – lyrics (track 8)
- Case Woodard – backing vocals (track 9)
- Chris Paton – guitar (track 9)
- Charles Farrar – composer & producer (track 9)
- Troy Taylor – composer & producer (track 9)
- Donald Earle "DeVante Swing" DeGrate Jr. – lyrics, drum programming, composer & producer (track 11)
- Chris Gehringer – mastering
- Lewis Tillman – executive producer
- Andre Harrell – executive producer
- Carol Friedman – art direction
- David Harley – design
- Randee St. Nicholas – photography
- Sybil Pennix – artwork

== Charts ==
Chart performance for Horace Brown
Chart (1996)	Peak position
UK Albums (Official Charts)	48
UK R&B Albums (Official Charts)	8
US Billboard 200	145
US Top R&B/Hip-Hop Albums (Billboard)	18
US Heatseekers Albums (Billboard)	8
