= Be Happy (Mary J. Blige song) =

- CD variant used for non-US retail releases

Single by Mary J. Blige

from the album My Life
- Released: October 26, 1994
- Genre: R&B; hip-hop soul
- Length: 5:49
- Label: Uptown; MCA
- Songwriters: Mary J. Blige; Arlene DelValle; Sean "Puffy" Combs; Jean-Claude Olivier; Curtis Mayfield
- Producers: Sean "Puffy" Combs; Poke

Mary J. Blige singles chronology
"My Love" (1994)	"Be Happy" (1994)	"I'm Going Down" (1995)

Music video
- "Be Happy" on YouTube

"Be Happy" is a song by American singer Mary J. Blige. It was written by Blige, Sean "Puffy" Combs, Arlene DeValle, and Jean-Claude Olivier from duo Poke & Tone for her second studio album, My Life (1994), while production was helmed by Combs and Olivier. "Be Happy" contains an instrumental sample of the song "You're So Good to Me" (1979) by musician Curtis Mayfield and a re-sung vocal portion of the record "I Want You" (1976) by Marvin Gaye.

The song was released as the lead single from the album in October 1994 by Uptown and MCA Records. It reached numbers 29 and 39 on the US Billboard Hot 100 and Cash Box Top 100 charts, while reaching number six on the Billboard Hot R&B/Hip-Hop Songs chart, becoming her fifth top-ten single on that particular chart. The song also peaked at number 30 on the UK Singles Chart. There were produced two official music videos for "Be Happy", both directed by Puff Daddy. Upon its release, Blige performed the song on Friday Night Videos, The Tonight Show with Jay Leno, Soul Train, Teen Summit, and Showtime at the Apollo among others.

== Remixes ==
The official remix features Def Squad rapper Keith Murray, which samples 1980s hip hop artist Jimmy Spicer's "Money (Dollar Bill Ya'll)". Blige and Murray performed the remix version during Showtime at the Apollo's 200th episode that aired in early February 1996.

== Critical reception ==
Larry Flick from Billboard magazine described the song as "a jam that deftly combines classic soul flavors with a jeep-smart urban/hip-hop spice." He added, "Her already stylish delivery has a pleasing new maturity and a warmth that will only broaden her audience. Factor in a sing-along chorus and a sweet melody, and you have the recipe for a multiformat smash." Steve Baltin from Cash Box felt "Be Happy" "is a little more R&B-oriented that her previous hits, making it a work that needs to grow on listeners rather than exploding with them. But once audiences catch up to Blige, they're sure to be drawn in by her sultry vocals during the chorus and the strong repetitive groove found throughout. A worthy song to carry on her growing success." Chuck Campbell from Knoxville News Sentinel noted the "chugging '70s groove" of the track.

Pan-European magazine Music & Media commented, "The queen of swingbeat sings her life motto on a prominent bass pattern. For the chorus the melody gets a 'What's Going On' twist with synth violins and all." Music Week gave it a score of four out of five, adding, "Already huge on import, 'Be Happy' should follow the recent 'Reminisce' remix up the charts." Ralph Tee from the Record Mirror Dance Update also gave it four out of five, writing that here, "the queen of hip hop soul returns, this time utilising a massive great chunk of Curtis Mayfield's 1979 gem 'You're So Good to Me' as her accompaniment. In fact she creates new lyrics and melodies over the original instrumental and cheekily includes the instrumental on the 12-inch as a self penned bonus track! However, while this isn't in the league of 'Love No Limit' with its Keni Burke sample, it's already set to be huge with fans." Another Record Mirror editor, James Hamilton, declared it as "superb" and "slinky" in his weekly dance column.

== Track listings ==
- US cassette single
1. "Be Happy" (Radio edit) – 4:29
2. "Be Happy" (Acapella version) – 4:34
- US 12-inch single
1. "Be Happy" (Album version) – 5:49
2. "Be Happy" (Instrumental) – 5:49
3. "Be Happy" (Acapella) – 4:34
- UK CD single – CD1
1. "Be Happy" (Radio edit) – 3:53
2. "Be Happy" (Album version) – 5:49
3. "Be Happy" (Maurice's Muthafunkin' mix) – 4:42
4. "Be Happy" (Uno Clio mix) – 7:19
5. "Be Happy" (Maurice's Be Happy House mix) – 7:32
- UK CD single – CD2
1. "Be Happy" (U.S. Radio edit) – 4:29
2. "Be Happy" (Ron G H. & R. Funk mix) – 3:42
3. "Be Happy" (Bad Boy Butter mix) – 4:41
4. "Be Happy" (UBQ Dub Be Happy) – 6:16
- UK 12-inch single
1. "Be Happy" (Album version) – 5:49
2. "Be Happy" (Uno Clio mix) – 7:19
3. "Be Happy" (Maurice's Be Happy House mix) – 7:32
4. "Be Happy" (UBQ Dub Be Happy) – 6:16
5. "Be Happy" (Maurice's Muthafunkin' mix) – 4:42
- UK cassette single
1. "Be Happy" (Radio edit) – 4:29
2. "Be Happy" (Maurice's Muthafunkin' mix) – 4:42

== Credits and personnel ==
Credits are adapted from the My Life liner notes.

- Mary J. Blige – lead vocals
- LaTonya J. Blige – background vocals
- Nashiem Myrick – recording engineer
- Prince Charles Alexander – recording engineer, audio mixing
- Tony Maserati – audio mixing
- Chucky Thompson – additional instruments

== Charts ==
=== Weekly charts ===
Chart (1994–1995)	Peak position
Australia (ARIA)	76
Europe (European Dance Radio)	13
UK Singles (Official Charts)	30
UK Dance (Official Charts)	5
UK R&B Singles (OCC)	2
UK Club Chart (Music Week)	1
US Billboard Hot 100	29
US Dance Singles Sales (Billboard)	7
US Hot R&B/Hip-Hop Songs (Billboard)	6
US Rhythmic Airplay (Billboard)	14
US Cash Box Top 100	39

=== Year-end charts ===
Chart (1995)	Position
UK Club Chart (Music Week)	46
US Hot R&B/Hip-Hop Songs (Billboard)	41

== Release history ==
Region	Date	Format(s)	Label(s)	Ref.
United States	October 1994	12-inch vinyl; cassette	Uptown; MCA	
United Kingdom	November 28, 1994	12-inch vinyl; CD1; cassette	Uptown; MCA	
United Kingdom	December 5, 1994	CD2	Uptown; MCA	
Japan	December 7, 1994	CD	Uptown; MCA	
Australia	February 6, 1995	CD; cassette	Uptown; MCA	
