= What's the 411? =

Studio album by Mary J. Blige
- Released: July 28, 1992
- Recorded: 1991–1992
- Studios: Chung King Studios (New York City); The Hit Factory (New York City); Marathon Studios (New York City); Soul Convention Studios (Queens, New York City)
- Genres: R&B; hip-hop soul; new jack swing
- Length: 51:59
- Labels: Uptown; MCA
- Producers: Sean "Puffy" Combs (exec.); DeVante Swing; Tony Dofat; Dave "Jam" Hall; Mark Morales; Cory Rooney

Mary J. Blige chronology
What's the 411? (1992)	What's the 411? Remix (1993)

Singles from What's the 411?
- 1. "You Remind Me" Released: June 23, 1992; 2. "Real Love" Released: August 25, 1992; 3. "Reminisce" Released: October 13, 1992; 4. "Sweet Thing" Released: April 2, 1993; 5. "Love No Limit" Released: May 10, 1993

What's the 411? is the debut album by American R&B singer Mary J. Blige. It was released on July 28, 1992, by Uptown Records and MCA Records. After signing a record contract with Uptown, Blige began working on the album with producer Sean "Puffy" Combs. Other producers and songwriters included DeVante Swing, Tony Dofat, Dave Hall, Mark Morales and Mark "Cory" Rooney. The resulting music covered hip hop soul, contemporary R&B, and new jack swing styles.

What's the 411? was also met with positive reviews from critics, who applauded Blige's singing and the combination of hip hop and soul music, which led to her being named the "Queen of Hip Hop Soul". The album peaked at number six on the US Billboard 200 and topped the US Top R&B/Hip-Hop Albums chart. It was certified triple platinum by the Recording Industry Association of America (RIAA) and eventually sold 3.5 million copies.

== Background ==
At the age of 17, Blige recorded a cover version of Anita Baker's "Caught Up in the Rapture" in a recording booth at a local mall. Her mother's boyfriend at the time later played the cassette to recording artist and A&R runner for Uptown Records, Jeff Redd. Redd then sent it to the president and chief executive officer of the label, Andre Harrell. Blige met with Harrell in 1990 and performed the song for him. She was signed to Uptown and became the label's youngest and third female recording artist (after Finesse N' Synquis).

== Recording ==
After being signed to Uptown Records, Blige began working with record producer Puff Daddy. He became the executive producer and produced a majority of the album. The title, What's the 411?, derived from Blige's past occupation as a 4-1-1 operator; it was also an indication by Blige of being the "real deal". The music was described as "revelatory on a frequent basis". Blige was noted for having a "tough girl persona and streetwise lyrics". The album begins with "Leave a Message", a collection of Blige's answering machine messages over a drum beat. The following two tracks, "Reminisce" and "You Remind Me", are melancholy songs that are overlaid with hip hop beats. A cover of Chaka Khan's "Sweet Thing" followed.

== Release and promotion ==
What's the 411? was released on July 28, 1992. It peaked at number six on the Billboard 200 and topped the Top R&B/Hip-Hop Albums chart. It also peaked at number 53 on the UK Albums Chart. The first single released to promote the album was "You Remind Me", originally from 1991 film Strictly Business. It reached the number 29 position on the pop charts and number 1 on the R&B charts in 1992. The next single, "Real Love" (#7 pop, #1 R&B, 1992), made Blige one of the year's biggest crossover successes.

With the album, Blige became the most successful new female R&B artist of 1992 in the United States, according to music scholar Dave McAleer. Reporting on the album's commercial success for Entertainment Weekly that year, Dave DiMartino said Blige's "powerful, soulful voice and hip-hop attitude" made her "solidly connected with an audience that has never seen a woman do new jack swing but loves it just the same". The following year, a remix album was released to further market What's the 411?, while "Sweet Thing" reached number 28 on the pop charts as a single.

In 2000, What's the 411? was certified triple platinum by the RIAA for shipments of over three million copies. As of July 2022, it has sold 3.5 million copies in the United States.

== Creation of hip hop soul ==
The release of this album would influence a larger wave within the hip-hop sphere, specifically championing the hip-hop soul genre. Daphne Brooks writes about the change this album evoked in her article, crediting Blige with pioneering the "hip-hop soul" sound, which combines the grit and rhythm of hip-hop with the emotional depth of traditional R&B. She goes on to explain that this fusion provided a platform for voicing the struggles and triumphs of young Black women in urban America. The album features an emphasized vulnerability and raw sound from Blige that would eventually come to be a staple sound in the hip-hop soul genre. What's the 411 is able to achieve the fused sound between hip-hop and R&B through this vocal sound as well as the lyrical content of the album. Blige conveys themes and stories of desire, betrayal, abandonment, affairs, marriage, domesticity, spirituality, sisterhood, and emotional violence. Before the release of this album, these storylines that represent experiences more relevant to Black women were rarely expressed in mainstream hip-hop. As a result, this album sparked a sub-genre that was based on hip-hop aesthetics, bass, and artists while appealing to a more female-dominated audience.

== Critical reception ==
Professional ratings
Review scores
Source	Rating
AllMusic	5/5 stars
Bravo	4/5 stars
Calgary Herald	C+
Chicago Tribune	2/4 stars
Christgau's Consumer Guide	(1-star Honorable Mention)
The Encyclopedia of Popular Music	4/5 stars
Entertainment Weekly	A
Los Angeles Times	3/4 stars
MusicHound R&B	3/5 stars
Orlando Sentinel	2/3 stars
The Rolling Stone Album Guide	4/5 stars

What's the 411? received positive reviews from contemporary critics. Reviewing the album for Entertainment Weekly in 1992, Havelock Nelson hailed it as "one of the most accomplished fusions of soul values and hip-hop to date" while comparing Blige's "powerful voice" to Khan, Anita Baker, and Caron Wheeler. Connie Johnson from the Los Angeles Times was particularly impressed by her rendition of "Sweet Thing" and "You Remind Me", calling the latter track "one of those perfect singer-to-song matches". People magazine said the album succeeded because of Blige's "fly-girl attitude" and singing ability, even though "she may not be Chaka Khan or Gladys Knight". Mitchell May was more critical in the Chicago Tribune, writing that aside from the title track and "Sweet Thing", What's the 411? was marred by dull production and "silly lyrics" depriving the singer of self-esteem. Village Voice critic Robert Christgau was largely unimpressed, grading the album a "dud" in his consumer guide. He later upgraded his score to a one-star honorable mention—indicating "a worthy effort that consumers attuned to its overriding aesthetic or individual vision may well like"; he named "Sweet Thing" and "Real Love" as highlights while writing that "real is not enough, but attached to the right voice it's something to build on".

The album was voted the year's 30th best in the Pazz & Jop—an annual poll of American critics nationwide, published by The Village Voice. It also earned Blige two Soul Train Music Awards in 1993: Best New R&B Artist and Best R&B Album, Female.

What's the 411? has since been viewed by critics as one of the 1990s' most important records. Blige's combination of vocals over a hip hop beat proved influential in contemporary R&B. With the album, she was dubbed the reigning "Queen of Hip Hop Soul", Stanton Swihart wrote in a retrospective review for AllMusic. He called it "the decade's most explosive, coming-out displays of pure singing prowess". According to David O'Donnell from BBC Music, What's the 411? was groundbreaking in its fusion of R&B hooks and hip hop beats, creating the formula for the contemporary R&B of the following decade. He complimented Blige's "sweet, soulful vocals", in line with Puff Daddy's "rough, jagged, hip-hop beats made for a winning combination that remains one of Blige's finest albums". In The Rolling Stone Album Guide (2004), Tom Moon wrote that with the album, Blige offered "a gritty undertone and a realism missing from much of the devotional love songs ruling the charts at that time."

In 2020, the album was ranked 271 on Rolling Stone's "500 Greatest Albums of All Time" list.

== Track listing ==
What's the 411? track listing
No.	Title	Writer(s)	Producer(s)	Length
1.	"Leave a Message"	Sean "Puffy" Combs; Tony Dofat	Dofat; Combs	3:38
2.	"Reminisce"	Kenny Greene; Dave Hall	Hall; Combs^{[A]}	5:24
3.	"Real Love"	Mark Morales; Mark C. Rooney	Morales; Rooney	4:32
4.	"You Remind Me"	Hall; Eric Milteer	Hall	4:19
5.	"Intro Talk" (performed by Busta Rhymes)	Dofat; Busta Rhymes	Dofat; Combs	2:17
6.	"Sweet Thing"	Chaka Khan; Tony Maiden	Morales; Rooney	3:46
7.	"Love No Limit"	Greene; Hall	Hall	5:01
8.	"I Don't Want to Do Anything" (featuring K-Ci Hailey of Jodeci)	DeVante Swing	DeVante Swing	5:52
9.	"Slow Down"	Rooney; Morales; Joseph E. Keeley	Morales; Rooney	4:33
10.	"My Love"	Greene; Hall	Hall	4:14
11.	"Changes I've Been Going Through"	Combs; Morales; Rooney	Combs; Morales; Rooney	5:15
12.	"What's the 411?" (featuring Grand Puba)	Dofat; Maxwell Dixon	Dofat; Combs	4:13
Total length:				51:59

Notes

- ^{^[A]} denotes co-producer

Sample credits

- "Leave a Message (Intro)" contains a sample of "P.S.K. – What Does It Mean?" as performed by Schoolly D.
- "Reminisce" contains a sample of "Stop, Look, Listen" as performed by MC Lyte.
- "Real Love" contains a sample of "Top Billin'" as performed by Audio Two.
- "You Remind Me" contains a sample of "Remind Me" as performed by Patrice Rushen.
- "Intro Talk (Interlude)" contains a sample of "Hydra" as performed by Grover Washington, Jr.
- "Sweet Thing" is a cover of "Sweet Thing" as performed by Rufus and Chaka Khan.
- "Changes I've Been Going Through" contains a sample of "Make the Music With Your Mouth, Biz" as performed by Biz Markie.
- "What's the 411?" contains a sample of "Pride and Vanity" as performed by the Ohio Players; "Very Special" as performed by Debra Laws.

== Personnel ==
- Mary J. Blige – vocals, background vocals
- Tabitha Brace – background vocals
- Jamie Brown – engineer
- Puff Daddy – producer
- Tony Dofat – producer, performer
- Steven Ett – engineer
- Mike Fonda – engineer
- Grand Puba – background vocals, vocal harmony, performer
- Andy Grassi – engineer
- Cedric "K-Ci" Hailey – vocal harmony, performer
- Dave Hall – drums, keyboards, producer
- Andre Harrell – engineer
- Kurt Juice – drums
- David Kennedy – engineer
- Clark Kent – engineer
- Billy Lawrence – background vocals
- Little Shawn – background vocals
- Tony Maserati – engineer
- Mark Morales A.K.A Prince Markie Dee – producer, drum machine
- Darryl Pearson – multi-instruments
- Gordon Picket – programming
- Mark C. Rooney – keyboards, background vocals, producer
- Terri Robinson – background vocals
- Busta Rhymes
- CL Smooth – background vocals
- DeVante Swing – keyboards, multi-instruments, producer
- Christopher Williams – background vocals

== Charts ==
=== Weekly charts ===
Weekly chart performance for What's the 411?
Chart (1992)	Peak position
UK Albums (Official Charts)	53
US Billboard 200	6
US Top R&B/Hip-Hop Albums (Billboard)	1

=== Year-end charts ===
Year-end chart performance for What's the 411?
Chart (1992)	Position
US Billboard 200	72
US Top R&B/Hip-Hop Albums (Billboard)	26
Chart (1993)	Position
US Billboard 200	36
US Top R&B/Hip-Hop Albums (Billboard)	9

== Certifications ==
Certifications for What's the 411?
Region	Certification	Certified units/sales
United Kingdom (BPI)	Silver	60,000^{*}
United States (RIAA)	4× Platinum	4,000,000^{‡}
^{*} Sales figures based on certification alone.^{‡} Sales+streaming figures based on certification alone.

== See also ==
- List of number-one R&B albums of 1992 (U.S.)
- What's the 411? Remix
