= My Love (Mary J. Blige song) =

Single by Mary J. Blige featuring Heavy D

from the album What's the 411? and What's the 411? Remix
- B-side: "Reminisce"
- Released: 1993 (promo); March 1994
- Genre: Swingbeat
- Length: 4:11 (album version); 3:56 (radio version); 7:13 (remix version)
- Label: Uptown; MCA
- Songwriters: Kenny Greene; Dave Hall; Heavy D
- Producers: Dave Hall (original album version); Teddy Riley (single remix) Walter "Mucho" Scott (single remix) Sprague "Doogie" Willams (single remix)

Mary J. Blige singles chronology
"You Don't Have to Worry" (1993)	"My Love" (1993)	"Be Happy" (1994)

"My Love" is a song by American R&B singer Mary J. Blige from her debut album, What's the 411? (1992). The song, released by Uptown and MCA Records, was co-written by singer-songwriter Kenny Greene and Dave Hall, who served as the song's original producer. It peaked at number 23 on the US Billboard Hot R&B/Hip-Hop Songs chart and at number 29 on the UK Singles Chart in 1994, becoming Blige's second single to reach the top 40 in the United Kingdom.

== Lyrics and composition ==
The lyrics discuss Mary J. Blige's relationship with her ex-lover, after his failed relationship with the woman he left Blige for he wants to come back and start over. This causes her to wonder "what you're gonna do without my love?"

== Versions ==
The original version is featured on Blige's debut album. A Teddy Riley-produced remix of the song, featuring rapper Heavy D, was released as a promotional single in 1994; this version is found on Blige's 1993 What's the 411? Remix album, in a longer form.

== Critical reception ==
Chris Roberts from Melody Maker felt that on the track, "Mary J Blige obligingly does that sleek swing thing of hers to sapid, even Sapphic, effect." Andy Beevers from Music Week gave it four out of five and named it Pick of the Week in the category of Dance, writing, "The mid-tempo swing track is not one of her best, but sales will be helped by the inclusion of house mixes of the earlier single, 'Reminisce'." James Hamilton from the Record Mirror Dance Update described it as "plaintively cooed" and "sinuous" in his weekly dance column.

== Track listings ==
- US cassette single
1. "My Love" (Hip Hop with Rap) – 3:56
2. "My Love" (New Jack Jazz) – 6:15
- US cassette maxi single
1. "My Love" (Hip Hop with Rap) – 3:56
2. "My Love" (Street Mix 1) – 6:35
3. "My Love" (New Jack Jazz) – 6:15
4. "My Love" (TR and Mary Mix) – 4:02
5. "My Love" (Acapella) – 3:52
- UK cassette single
1. "My Love" (Radio Mix) – 3:56
2. "My Love" (Album Version) – 4:14
- UK CD single and UK 12" single – version 1
1. "My Love" (Radio Mix) – 3:56
2. "My Love" (On Da Street) – 6:35
3. "Reminisce" (Uno Clio Mix) – 6:14
4. "Reminisce" (Sure is Pure Dub Two) – 7:16
- UK 12" single – version 2
1. "My Love" (Album Version) – 4:14
2. "Reminisce" (D&D Dub) – 6:20
3. "Reminisce" (S.D.A. Dub) – 9:09
4. "Reminisce" (Sure is Pure Dub One) – 6:36

== Charts ==
=== Weekly charts ===
Chart (1994)	Peak position
UK Singles (OCC)	29
UK Dance (Music Week)	3
UK Club Chart (Music Week)	2
US Hot R&B/Hip-Hop Songs (Billboard)	23

=== Year-end charts ===
Chart (1994)	Position
UK Club Chart (Music Week)	34
US Hot R&B/Hip-Hop Songs (Billboard)	100

== Release history ==
Region	Date	Format(s)	Label(s)	Ref.
United States	March 1994	12-inch vinyl; cassette	Uptown; MCA	
United Kingdom	May 2, 1994	12-inch vinyl; CD; cassette	Uptown; MCA	
