= Intro (Intro album) =

Studio album by Intro
- Released: March 22, 1993
- Studio: Playground Studios (Closter, New Jersey); Axis Studios (New York City); Soundtrack Recording (New York City)
- Genre: R&B
- Length: 60:41
- Label: Atlantic
- Producer: Dave "Jam" Hall; DJ Eddie F.; K-Smoove; Nevelle Hodge; Genard Parker

Intro chronology
Intro (1993)	New Life (1995)

Singles from Intro
- 1. "Love Thang" Released: March 25, 1993; 2. "Let Me Be the One" Released: June 17, 1993; 3. "Come Inside" Released: September 30, 1993; 4. "Ribbon in the Sky" Released: 1993

Professional ratings
Review scores
Source	Rating
AllMusic	3/5 stars

Intro is the debut album by American contemporary R&B trio Intro. It was released on March 22, 1993, through Atlantic Records. The group's debut album was A&R'd and Executive Produced by Eddie 'F' Ferrell p/k/a DJ Eddie F. Recording sessions took place at Playground Recording in Closter, Axis Studios and Soundtrack Recording in New York. Production was handled by "The Untouchables", - Eddie F, Nevelle Hodge, Dave "Jam" Hall, K-Smoove, Genard Parker, and Darin Whittington.

The album peaked at number 65 on the Billboard 200 and number 11 on the Top R&B Albums charts in the United States. It was certified gold by the Recording Industry Association of America on November 10, 1993, for selling 500,000 copies in the US alone. The album spawned four singles: "Love Thang!!!", "Let Me Be the One", "Come Inside" and "Ribbon in the Sky".

The album's lead single, "Love Thang!!!" peaked at No. 11 on the Bubbling Under Hot 100 and No. 28 on the Hot R&B Songs charts. The second single off of the album, "Let Me Be the One", made it to No. 12 on the Bubbling Under Hot 100 and No. 23 on the Hot R&B Songs charts. The third single, "Come Inside", became the group's most successful song reaching No. 33 on the Billboard Hot 100 and No. 9 on the Hot R&B Songs charts. The album's fourth and final single, a cover version of Stevie Wonder's "Ribbon in the Sky", entered Billboard's R&B Radio Airplay monitor in June 1993, and in 1994 it peaked at No. 5 on the Bubbling Under Hot 100 and No. 11 on the Hot R&B Songs charts.

== Track listing ==
Intro track listing
No.	Title	Writer(s)	Producer(s)	Length
1.	"Love Thang"	Kenneth G. Greene; Edward Ferrell; Maurice Hodge	DJ Eddie F.; Nevelle Hodge	5:07
2.	"Let Me Be the One"	Greene; David Hall	Dave "Jam" Hall	4:57
3.	"Anything for You"	Greene; Clinton Wike; Kenny Kornegay	K-Smoove; Darin Whittington (co.)	5:15
4.	"Why Don't You Love Me?"	Greene; Hall	Nevelle Hodge	5:31
5.	"It's All About You"	Greene; Hall; Roy Charles Hammond	Dave "Jam" Hall	4:55
6.	"Ribbon in the Sky"	Stevland Hardaway Judkins	Nevelle Hodge	6:22
7.	"Don't Leave Me"	Greene; Wike; Jeff Sanders; Ernesta Pierre; Hodge	Nevelle Hodge	5:41
8.	"Come Inside"	Greene; Hodge	Nevelle Hodge	8:09
9.	"One of a Kind Love"	Greene; Hodge	Nevelle Hodge	5:25
10.	"So Many Reasons"	Greene; Hall	Dave "Jam" Hall	4:43
11.	"Ecstacy of Love"	Greene; Genard Parker	Genard Parker	4:27
Total length:				60:41

Sample credits

- Track 2 contains a sample of "Gotta Have It" by Ed O.G. & The Bulldogs.
- Track 5 contains a sample of "Impeach the President" by The Honeydrippers.

Notes

- Track 11 is a CD bonus track.

== Personnel ==
- Kenny "G-Love" Greene – lead vocals (track 1), background vocals, vocal arrangement
- Clinton "Buddy" Wike – background vocals
- Jeff Sanders – background vocals
- Melissa Pierce – background vocals (track 9)
- Elizabeth Cocco – background vocals (track 11)
- Kenny "K-Smoove" Kornegay – keyboards and producer (track 3)
- Darin "Piano Man" Whittington – keyboards and co-producer (track 3)
- Garth Gayle – guitar (track 11)
- Dave "Jam" Hall – additional keyboards (track 11), producer (tracks 2, 5, 10), recording (track 2)
- Nevelle Hodge – vocal arrangement (tracks 8, 9), producer (tracks 1, 4, 6–9)
- Edward "DJ Eddie F." Ferrell – producer and engineering (track 1), executive producer
- David Kennedy – recording (tracks 4, 5), music tracking (tracks 3, 7, 8)
- Mark Partis – recording (tracks 6, 9, 10), mixing (tracks 4, 6, 7, 9), vocals tracking (tracks 7, 8)
- David Dachinger – recording (tracks 6, 10), vocals tracking (tracks 3, 7, 8)
- Robert Dana Vlcek – recording (track 8), engineering assistant (track 11)
- Rich July – recording (track 11)
- Rod Hui – mixing (tracks 2, 3, 10)
- Kirk Yano – mixing (track 5)
- Alan Gregorie – mixing (tracks 8, 11)
- Jason DeCosta – engineering assistant (tracks 1–5, 9, 10)
- Jimmie Lee Patterson – engineering assistant (track 8)
- Michael Fossenkemper – vocals tracking (track 2)
- Chris Gehringer – mastering
- Kevin Woodley – executive producer
- Richard Nash – executive producer
- Sharon A. Daley – production coordinator
- Kevin Hosmann – art direction
- Annalisa – photography

== Charts ==
Chart performance for Intro
Chart (1993)	Peak position
US Billboard 200	65
US Top R&B/Hip-Hop Albums (Billboard)	11

== Certifications ==
Certifications for Intro
Region	Certification	Certified units/sales
United States (RIAA)	Gold	500,000^{^}
^{^} Shipments figures based on certification alone.
