= You Remind Me =

1992 single by Mary J. Blige

Single by Mary J. Blige

from the album What's the 411? and Strictly Business
- Released: June 23, 1992
- Genre: R&B
- Length: 4:19
- Label: Uptown; MCA
- Songwriter: Eric Milteer
- Producer: Dave "Jam" Hall

Mary J. Blige singles chronology
"You Remind Me" (1992)	"Real Love" (1992)

Music video
- "You Remind Me" on YouTube

"You Remind Me" is a song by American singer-songwriter Mary J. Blige. It served as Blige's first single from her debut album, What's the 411? (1992). Written by Eric Milteer and produced by Dave "Jam" Hall, it was originally used on the soundtrack of 1991 comedy film Strictly Business. The song marked Blige's first top 40 hit, reaching number 29 on the Billboard Hot 100 and number one on the Hot R&B Singles chart. The music video was released in 1992. The song also sampled Patrice Rushen's 1982 song, "Remind Me".

== Critical reception ==
J.D. Considine from The Baltimore Sun complimented the "smooth, soulful balladry" of "You Remind Me". Havelock Nelson from Entertainment Weekly noted its "cascading, intricately layered mid-tempo beat". James Hamilton from Music Week's RM Dance Update described it as a "slinky groin grinder". Dele Fadele from NME remarked its "massed harmonies, lovely arrangements and subtle hip-hop beats" and "a luxurious, creamy vocal that makes you wonder why record companies don't seek out more black female singers (remember Cherrelle, Candi Staton, et al)." Parry Gettelman from Orlando Sentinel wrote, "Blige's voice swoops and croons wonderfully on her big hit, "You Remind Me". The tune is built around a nice little phrase but wouldn't really go anywhere if it weren't for the funky hip-hop beat."

== Track listings ==
- US Cassette single
1. "You Remind Me" (Radio version) – 4:15
2. "You Remind Me" (Extended instrumental) – 5:08
- US Cassette maxi-single and CD single
1. "You Remind Me" (Daddy Hip Hop) – 5:56
2. "You Remind Me" (Bentley's) – 4:43
3. "You Remind Me" (AD's Radio) – 5:12
4. "You Remind Me" (Jazz mix) – 5:15
- US 12-inch single
1. "You Remind Me" (Daddy Hip Hop) – 5:56
2. "You Remind Me" (AD's Radio) – 5:12
3. "You Remind Me" (Bentley's) – 4:43
- UK 7-inch single (1992)
1. "You Remind Me" (Album version) – 4:15
2. "You Remind Me" (Bentley's) – 4:43
- UK 12-inch single (1992)
1. "You Remind Me" (Daddy Hip Hop) – 5:56
2. "Leave a Message" (Album version) – 3:38
3. "You Remind Me" (AD's Radio) – 5:12
4. "You Remind Me" (Bentley's) – 4:43
- UK CD single (1992)
1. "You Remind Me" (Album version) – 4:15
2. "You Remind Me" (Bentley's) – 4:43
3. "Leave a Message" (Album version) – 3:38
4. "You Remind Me" (Daddy Hip Hop) – 5:56
- UK Cassette single (1993)
1. "You Remind Me" (Straight to the Heart radio edit) – 3:19
2. "You Remind Me" (Album version) – 4:15
- UK CD single – CD1 (1993)
1. "You Remind Me" (Straight to the Heart radio edit) – 3:19
2. "You Remind Me" (Straight to the Heart mix) – 5:41
3. "You Remind Me" (Album version) – 4:15
4. "You Remind Me" (AD's Radio) – 5:12
- UK CD single – CD2 (1993)
1. "You Remind Me" (Bentley's) – 4:43
2. "You Remind Me" (Phat remix) – 5:37
3. "Love No Limit" (Puff Daddy remix) – 3:57
4. "Love No Limit" (Bad Boy mix) – 3:58

== Credits and personnel ==
Credits are adapted from the What's the 411? liner notes.

- Sean "Puffy" Combs – executive producer
- Dave "Jam" Hall – producer
- Andre Harrell – executive producer
- Eric Milteer – songwriting

== Charts ==
=== Weekly charts ===
Chart (1992–1993)	Peak position
Europe (European Dance Radio)	24
UK Singles (OCC)	48
UK Dance (Music Week)	14
UK Club Chart (Music Week)	61
US Billboard Hot 100	29
US Dance Singles Sales (Billboard)	7
US Hot R&B/Hip-Hop Songs (Billboard)	1
US Rhythmic (Billboard)	23
US Cash Box Top 100	17

=== Year-end charts ===
Chart (1992)	Position
US Hot R&B/Hip-Hop Songs (Billboard)	3

== Certifications ==
Region	Certification	Certified units/sales
United States (RIAA)	Gold	500,000^{^}
^{^} Shipments figures based on certification alone.

== Release history ==
Region	Date	Format(s)	Label(s)	Ref.
United States	June 23, 1992	12-inch vinyl; CD; cassette	Uptown; MCA	
United Kingdom	June 1, 1993	12-inch vinyl; CD; cassette	MCA	

== See also ==
- List of number-one R&B singles of 1992 (U.S.)
