= Real Love (Mary J. Blige song) =

1992 single by Mary J. Blige

Single by Mary J. Blige

from the album What's the 411?
- B-side: "What's the 411?"
- Released: July 28, 1992
- Genre: R&B; hip hop soul; new jack swing
- Length: 4:30
- Label: Uptown; MCA
- Songwriters: Cory Rooney; Mark Morales
- Producers: Cory Rooney; Mark Morales

Mary J. Blige singles chronology
"You Remind Me" (1992)	"Real Love" (1992)	"Reminisce" (1992)

Music video
- "Real Love" at VH1.com

"Real Love" is a song by American singer Mary J. Blige from her debut studio album, What's the 411? (1992). Based on real life experiences, it was written and produced by Cory Rooney and Mark Morales, and samples Audio Two's 1987 song "Top Billin'". The song was issued as the album's second single on July 28, 1992 by Uptown and MCA. It became Blige's first top-10 hit, peaking at numbers seven and nine on the US Billboard Hot 100 and Cash Box Top 100 charts. It also topped the Billboard Hot R&B/Hip-Hop Songs and Rhythmic charts and was certified Gold by the Recording Industry Association of America (RIAA) on November 4, 1992. Marcus Raboy directed the song's music video. Rolling Stone included "Real Love" in their list of "500 Best Songs of All Time" in 2021 at number 327.

== Background ==
The creation of "Real Love" started with Morales writing the lyrics in-studio; according to Rooney, he started singing the first few lines, and Rooney liked its hint of rap, thus prompting him to create a bridge and melody. Regarding the song's meaning, Rooney said, "Mary J. Blige is the female that’s from the hood that sings the pain of all of the females from the hood. At that point in her life, she was being taken advantage of by a lot of the industry cats and a song like 'Real Love' described her situation."

== Critical reception ==
In a retrospective review, Daryl McIntosh of Albumism noted that "the sped-up baseline [sic]" of Audio Two's "Top Billin'", in the background, "provided the perfect head-nodding cadence for Blige's soulful exploration of her Mr. Right." Stanton Swihart, from AllMusic, stated that "Real Love", and songs like it, "are and will remain timeless slices of soul even after their trendiness has worn off". The Daily Vault's Mark Millan described it as an "upbeat love song that the young Blige revels in singing". He added that "it still gets a rousing response when she dusts it off during gigs." In his weekly UK chart commentary, James Masterton felt that "it's not commercial enough to be a major hit". Chris Roberts from Melody Maker felt that Blige "oozes out that yumsome breed of smoky pop-funk" on the track. James Hamilton from Music Week's RM Dance Update viewed it as "En Vogue-ish". Parry Gettelman from Orlando Sentinel felt the beat made the song "listenable enough". Jonathan Bernstein from Spin complimented its "irresistible bounce".

== Music video ==
The official music video for the song was directed by American film and music video director Marcus Raboy.

== Impact and legacy ==
In 2021, Rolling Stone included "Real Love" in their list of "500 Best Songs of All Time" at number 327. In 2022, Pitchfork ranked it at number 39 in their list of "The 250 Best Songs of the 1990s". Mary J. Blige is set to produce a Lifetime movie on "Real Love."

== Track listings ==
- US cassette and 7-inch single
1. "Real Love" (album version) – 4:30
2. "Real Love" (hip-hop version) – 4:30
- US maxi-CD and maxi-cassette single
1. "Real Love" (album version) – 4:30
2. "Real Love" (hip-hop mix) – 5:00
3. "Real Love" (acapella version) – 3:32
4. "Real Love" (hip-hop club mix) – 4:40
5. "Real Love" (instrumental) – 4:38
- European CD single
1. "Real Love" (radio version) – 4:10
2. "Real Love" (album version) – 4:30
3. "What's the 411?" (album version) – 4:13
4. "Real Love" (hip-hop club mix) – 4:40
- UK 7-inch single (1992)
1. "Real Love" (album version) – 4:30
2. "Real Love" (hip-hop mix) – 5:00
- UK 12-inch and CD single (1992)
1. "Real Love" (album version) – 4:30
2. "Real Love" (hip-hop mix) – 4:40
3. "Real Love" (The Fresh N' Funky mix) – 4:29
4. "Real Love" (The Talkin' Love mix) – 4:27
- UK cassette single (1993)
1. "Real Love" (Brixton Flavour 7-inch) (Without Rap) – 3:55
2. "Real Love" (original UK 7-inch) – 4:10
- UK CD single (1993)
1. "Real Love" (Brixton Flavour 7-inch) (Without Rap) – 3:55
2. "Real Love" (original UK 7-inch) – 4:10
3. "Real Love" (Brixton Flavour 12-inch) – 6:06
4. "Real Love" (Blacksmith's Summer Sound 12-inch) – 6:22
5. "Real Love" (West End (A.W.M.) mix) – 5:13
6. "Real Love" (hip-hop club mix) – 4:40
7. "Real Love" (acapella) – 3:40
- UK 12-inch single – Version 1 (1993)
1. "Real Love" (Brixton Flavour 12-inch) – 6:06
2. "Real Love" (West End (A.W.M.) mix) – 5:13
3. "Real Love" (Blacksmith's Summer Sound 12-inch) – 6:22
4. "Real Love" (hip-hop club mix) – 4:40
5. "Real Love" (acapella) – 3:40
- UK 12-inch single – Version 2 (1993)
1. "Real Love" (Phat remix) – 4:59
2. "Real Love" (album version) – 4:30
3. "I Don't Want to Do Anything" (duet with K-Ci Hailey) (album version) – 5:50
4. "Love No Limit" (Puff Daddy remix) – 3:57

== Credits and personnel ==
Credits adapted from the What's the 411? liner notes.

- Cory Rooney – producer
- Mark Morales – producer
- Sean Combs – executive producer
- Charlie Davis – executive producer
- Kurt Woodley – executive producer

== Charts ==
=== Weekly charts ===
Chart (1992–1993)	Peak position
Canada Top Singles (RPM)	34
Canada Dance/Urban (RPM)	7
Europe (European Dance Radio)	17
UK Singles (Official Charts)	26
UK Airplay (Music Week)	17
UK Dance (Music Week)	3
UK Club Chart (Music Week)	21
US Billboard Hot 100	7
US Dance Club Songs (Billboard)	36
US Dance Singles Sales (Billboard)	5
US Hot R&B/Hip-Hop Songs (Billboard)	1
US Pop Airplay (Billboard)	8
US Rhythmic Airplay (Billboard)	1
US Cash Box Top 100	9

=== Year-end charts ===
Chart (1992)	Position
US Billboard Hot 100	85
US Hot R&B Singles (Billboard)	22
US Maxi-Singles Sales (Billboard)	46

Chart (1993)	Position
US Billboard Hot 100	58

== Certifications ==
Region	Certification	Certified units/sales
New Zealand (RMNZ)	Gold	15,000^{‡}
United Kingdom (BPI)	Silver	200,000^{‡}
United States (RIAA)	Gold	500,000^{^}
^{^} Shipments figures based on certification alone.^{‡} Sales+streaming figures based on certification alone.

== Release history ==
Region	Date	Format(s)	Label(s)	Ref.
United States	July 28, 1992	7-inch vinyl; 12-inch vinyl; CD; cassette	Uptown; MCA	
United Kingdom	November 16, 1992	7-inch vinyl; 12-inch vinyl; CD; cassette	Uptown; MCA	
Australia	December 14, 1992	12-inch vinyl; CD; cassette	Uptown; MCA	

== Toby Lightman version ==
"Real Love"

Single by Toby Lightman

from the album Little Things
- Released: June 29, 2004
- Genre: Pop rock
- Length: 5:26
- Label: Lava
- Songwriters: Cory Rooney; Mark Morales

Toby Lightman singles chronology
"Everyday" (2004)	"Real Love" (2004)	"Operator" (2004)

Music video
- "Real Love" on YouTube

In 2004, American pop rock singer-songwriter Toby Lightman covered "Real Love" and included it as the closing track on the re-release of her debut studio album, Little Things (2004). The song was issued as the third and final single from the album, and it peaked at No. 35 on the Billboard top 40 chart.

=== Music video ===
The official music video for the song was directed by Charles Jensen.

=== Charts ===
Chart (2004)	Peak position
US Adult Top 40 (Billboard)	35

== See also ==
- List of number-one R&B singles of 1992 (U.S.)
