= You Don't Have to Worry (Mary J. Blige song) =

- US commercial cassette single

Single by Mary J. Blige featuring Craig Mack

from the album Who's the Man?
- Released: October 19, 1993
- Genre: R&B
- Length: 4:55
- Label: Uptown; MCA
- Songwriter(s): Kenny Greene; Edward "DJ Eddie F" Ferrell
- Producer(s): Ferrell; K-Smoove; Darin "Piano Man" Whittington

Mary J. Blige singles chronology
"Love No Limit" (1993)	"You Don't Have to Worry" (1993)	"My Love" (1994)

Craig Mack singles chronology
"You Don't Have to Worry" (1993)	"Flava in Ya Ear" (1994)

"You Don't Have to Worry" is a song by American R&B singer Mary J. Blige. It was written by Kenny Greene and Edward "DJ Eddie F" Ferrell for the soundtrack of the film Who's the Man? (1993), while production was helmed by Ferrell, with co-production from Kenny "K-Smoove" Kornegay and Darin "Piano Man" Whittington. It contains a sample of "Papa Don't Take No Mess" by James Brown. Released as a single, it charted on the US Billboard Hot 100, peaking at number 63, while reaching number 11 on the Billboard Hot R&B/Hip-Hop Songs. A remix version featuring rapper Craig Mack was produced by Sean "Puffy" Combs and Tony Dofat and later included on Blige's remix album, What's the 411? Remix (1993).

== Critical reception ==
In 2013, the original version of "You Don't Have to Worry" placed 20th on Complex magazine's "50 Best R&B Songs That Flipped Rap Beats", while its remix version with Craig Mack ranked 33rd on the list.

== Music video ==
The accompanying music video for "You Don't Have to Worry" was directed by American film director, film producer, and music video director F. Gary Gray and filmed at various locations in New York City in the summer of 1993. It depicts Blige performing in a jersey with a New York Yankees cap, baggy jeans and Timberland boots, also wearing an all denim suit by Daniel Poole performing on top of a car in front of a large crowd (a still from the video appears on the cover of 'What's the 411 Remix' Album). The song's original version, which appears in the video, has a slightly alternate difference towards the one on the soundtrack: Blige's vocals throughout the song is multitracked, and the backing vocals are omitted.

== Tracklisting ==
- US Cassette single
1. "You Don't Have to Worry" (Album Radio Mix) – 4:05
2. "You Don't Have to Worry" (Remix Main with Rap) – 5:18
- US 12" single
1. "You Don't Have to Worry" (Album Radio Mix) – 4:05
2. "You Don't Have to Worry" (Radio Mix with Clean Rap) – 4:35
3. "You Don't Have to Worry" (Remix Main with Rap) – 5:18
- UK CD single
1. "You Don't Have to Worry" (Album Radio Remix) – 4:05
2. "You Don't Have to Worry" (Radio Remix with Clean Rap) – 4:35
3. "You Don't Have to Worry" (Remix Main with Rap) – 5:18
4. "You Don't Have to Worry" (Album Radio Remix Instrumental) – 4:05
- UK 12" single
1. "You Don't Have to Worry" (Remix Main with Rap) – 5:18
2. "You Don't Have to Worry" (Album Radio Remix) – 4:05
3. "You Don't Have to Worry" (Radio Remix with Clean Rap) – 4:35
4. "You Don't Have to Worry" (Album Radio Remix Instrumental) – 4:05

== Charts ==
Chart (1993–1994)	Peak position
UK Singles (OCC)	36
UK Dance (Music Week)	9
UK Club Chart (Music Week)	39
US Billboard Hot 100	63
US Dance Singles Sales (Billboard)	16
US Hot R&B/Hip-Hop Songs (Billboard)	11

== Release history ==
Region	Date	Format(s)	Label(s)	Ref.
United States	October 19, 1993	12-inch vinyl; cassette	Uptown; MCA	
United Kingdom	November 22, 1993	12-inch vinyl; CD; cassette	Uptown; MCA	
