= Dr. Jeckyll & Mr. Hyde (group) =

American hip hop group (1980–1987)

- Origin: Harlem, New York, US
- Genres: East Coast hip-hop
- Years active: 1980–1987
- Label: Profile
- Past members: Andre Harrell; Alonzo Brown

Dr. Jeckyll & Mr. Hyde was an American 1980s hip hop group consisting of Andre "Dr. Jeckyll" Harrell and Alonzo "Mr. Hyde" Brown. The group was known for its corporate business image, wearing designer suits and ties while they rapped. The group first performed under the name Harlem World Crew and recorded on Tayster and Rojac Records in 1980.

Alonzo Brown joined Profile Records in 1981 under the name Lonnie Love, and recorded the song "Young Ladies".

That same year, Brown teamed with Harrell to make "Genius Rap", a well-received record which was one of the first hip-hop records to use a sample of Tom Tom Club's "Genius of Love".

The pair ended their professional relationship in 1987, but Mr. Hyde continued recording with Profile Records, recording the solo 12", "The Witch" b/w "Hyde's Beat".

After the group ended, Harrell became the founder and chief executive officer of Uptown Records. He later headed Motown Records.

Brown became a producer and screenwriter, serving as executive producer for the Judge Mathis television show.

Dr. Jeckyll & Mr. Hyde were a popular group on Mike Allen's Capital Radio UK hip hop radio show, leading them to appear at the UK Fresh 86 concert at Wembley Arena on the 19 July 1986.

Harrell died at his home in West Hollywood, California on May 7, 2020, at age 59.

== Discography ==
- The Champagne of Rap (1985)

== See also ==
- List of hip-hop musicians from New York City
