= You Don't Have to Worry =

You Don't Have to Worry may refer to:

- "You Don't Have to Worry" (En Vogue song), 1990
- "You Don't Have to Worry" (Mary J. Blige song), 1993
- "You Don't Have to Worry" (New Edition song), 1996
- "You Don't Have to Worry", a song from the Tevin Campbell album Back to the World, 1996
