= Little Things (Toby Lightman album) =

Studio album by Toby Lightman
- Released: March 30, 2004 (original version); July 20, 2004 (re-release)
- Recorded: 2003–2004
- Genre: Pop rock
- Length: 42:35 (original version); 48:08 (re-release)
- Label: Lava
- Producer: Peter Zizzo

Toby Lightman chronology
Little Things (2004)	Bird on a Wire (2006)

Singles from Little Things
- 1. "Devils and Angels" Released: December 2, 2003; 2. "Everyday" Released: May 4, 2004; 3. "Real Love" Released: June 29, 2004

Professional ratings
Review scores
Source	Rating
AllMusic	2.5/5 stars

Little Things is the first studio album by the American pop rock recording artist Toby Lightman, released on March 30, 2004, by Lava Records. The album peaked at #200 on the Billboard 200, and is Lightman's only album to appear on the chart.

Two singles were released from the original album: "Devils and Angels" and "Everyday". The album was re-released on July 20, 2004, with the addition of a cover version of Mary J. Blige's "Real Love", which was the album's third single.

== Track listing ==
All tracks are written by Toby Lightman, except where noted

No.	Title	Writer(s)	Length
1.	"Leave It Inside"	Aaron Albano; Fred Sargolini; Toby Lightman	3:02
2.	"Devils and Angels"		3:54
3.	"Coming Back In"		4:05
4.	"Frightened"	Aaron Albano; Fred Sargolini; Toby Lightman	3:52
5.	"The River"	Aaron Albano; Fred Sargolini; Toby Lightman	3:52
6.	"Voices"		3:43
7.	"Little Thing"		0:49
8.	"Front Row"	Aaron Albano; Fred Sargolini; Toby Lightman	3:33
9.	"Everyday"		3:47
10.	"Is This Right"		3:58
11.	"Don't Wanna Know"	Aaron Albano; Fred Sargolini; Toby Lightman	3:37
12.	"Running Away"		4:23
13.	"Real Love" (Mary J. Blige cover (Note: "Real Love" did not appear on the original version of the album.))	Corey Rooney; Mark Morales	5:26
Total length:			48:08

== Production credits ==
- Rob Mounsey – string arrangements
- David Mann – saxophone
- Nile Rodgers – electric guitar
- Tom Lord-Alge – mixing
- Tom Barney – bass guitar, upright bass
- Bashiri Johnson – percussion
- Joe Bonadio – percussion
- Matt Brown – engineer
- Jimmy Douglass – mixing
- Chris Gehringer – mastering
- Jesse Levy – cello
- Rob Mathes – conductor, horn arrangements
- Ozzie Melendez – trombone
- Sandra Park – violin
- Leon Pendarvis – conductor, string arrangements
- Andy Snitzer – saxophone
- Richard Travali – mixing
- Gerry Leonard – electric gitar
- Lynn Kowalewski – art direction
- Femio Hernández – engineer
- Peter Zizzo – acoustic guitar, bass guitar, piano, drums, electric guitar, keyboards, producer, engineer, executive producer, tiple, digital editing, vocal arrangement, drum programming, synthesizer bass, keyboard programming, synthesizer piano, pianette
- Ariel Martin – management
- FS – beats
- Steve Penny – assistant
- William Gallison – harmonica
- Jen Scaturro – keyboards, programming, digital editing, keyboard programming ("Devils and Angels", "The River", "Frightened", "Front Row", "Coming Back In", "Is This Right?")
- Nikki Hirsch – product manager
- Andrew Karp – A&R
- Steve Rakidzioski – assistant
- Toby Lightman – acoustic guitar, drums, lead vocals, background vocals, executive producer, vocal arrangement, drum programming

== Chart positions ==
Chart (2004)	Peak position
US Billboard 200	200
US Top Heatseekers (Billboard)	14
