= Toby Lightman =

American singer-songwriter (born 1978)

- Born: 1978 (age 47–48)
- Origin: Cherry Hill, New Jersey, U.S.
- Genres: Pop, rock, acoustic
- Occupation: Singer-songwriter
- Years active: 2002–present
- Labels: Lava; Atlantic; T Killa Records
- Website: www.tobylightman.com

Toby Lightman is an American singer-songwriter. Her first album, Little Things, was released in 2004 on Lava/Atlantic. Her second album, Bird on a Wire was released in 2006.

== Biography ==
Raised in Cherry Hill, New Jersey, Lightman began playing the violin as a child. She was a member of the orchestra at Cherry Hill High School East and started singing when a friend urged her to join a vocal workshop class. The audience response to a solo performance in which Lightman sang a gospel version of Simon and Garfunkel's "Bridge Over Troubled Water" led her to pursue her talents as a singer after she graduated from high school in 1996.

Bird on a Wire, Lightman's second record, was released on July 25, 2006, on Atlantic Records. "My Sweet Song" was featured near the end of the Boston Legal episode, "Desperately Seeking Shirley" while also featuring in the closing scene of the Bones episode, "The Maggots In The Meathead". It was also featured in the soundtrack to the movie P.S. I Love You. The song "Slippin'" appeared on ABC's Brothers & Sisters. Lightman performed the opening theme to Fox Sports' coverage of the NASCAR racing season with a song titled "NASCAR Love (Let's Go Racing)".

Lightman received the 2025 SONA Emerging Songwriter Warrior Award, presented by YouTube Songwriters, and serves as a governor of the Recording Academy's New York Chapter.

Her tenth studio album, Stars, was released on May 29, 2026. It is her second self-produced record. The album's first single, "Higher," was recorded by American Idol finalist Breanna Nix, whose version reached number one on the iTunes Country chart, the iTunes Top Songs chart, and the Billboard Christian Digital Song Sales chart.

=== Albums ===
==== Studio albums ====
Year	Title	Peak chart positions	
Year	Title	US	US Heat.
2004	Little Things	200	14
2006	Bird on a Wire	—	30
2008	Let Go	—	—
2010	Know Where I'm From	—	—
2014	Every Kind of People	—	—
2019	When the Lion Sleeps	—	—
2022	After All	—	—
2026	Stars	—	—

==== Extended plays ====
Year	Title
2013	Holding a Heart
2015	Holiday Lights
2016	Long Hard Day
2025	Vanderbilt

=== Singles ===
Year	Title	Peak chart positions	Album
Year	Title	US Adult	Album
2003	"Devils and Angels"	17	Little Things
2004	"Everyday"	—	Little Things
2004	"Real Love"	35	Little Things
2004	"Operator"	—	Non-album single
2006	"Holding Me Down"	—	Bird on a Wire
2006	"Sleigh Ride"	—	Non-album singles
2008	"Waiting"	—	Non-album singles
2010	"Snow Day"	—	Non-album singles
2018	"Spaces"	—	After All
2018	"Breathe In"	—	After All
2020	"Begin Again"	—	After All
2020	"I'm Comin' Over"	—	Non-album single
2020	"Ebb and Flow"	—	After All
2022	"Help Me Get Over This"	—	After All
2023	"Glow"	—	Non-album singles
2023	"Let's Get Together"	—	Non-album singles
2024	"Breathe In (The Ugly Cry Remix)"	—	Non-album singles
2024	"Devils and Angels (Revisited)"	—	Non-album singles
2025	"Higher"	—	Stars
