= Project Funk da World =

Project: Funk da World

Studio album by Craig Mack
- Released: September 20, 1994
- Recorded: 1993−1994
- Studios: The Hit Factory (New York City); Legend Studios & Recording (Long Island, New York); Northshore Sound Works (Brooklyn, New York); The Power Station (New York City)
- Genres: Hip hop; boom bap
- Length: 49:04
- Labels: Bad Boy; Arista
- Producers: Sean "Puffy" Combs (exec.); Alvin Toney (exec.); Craig Mack; Easy Mo Bee; Rashad Smith; Lenny "Ace" Marrow

Craig Mack chronology
Project: Funk da World (1994)	Operation: Get Down (1997)

Singles from Project: Funk da World
- 1. "Flava in Ya Ear" Released: July 2, 1994; 2. "Get Down" Released: December 12, 1994; 3. "Making Moves with Puff" Released: 1995

Project: Funk da World is the debut studio album by American rapper Craig Mack. It was released on September 20, 1994, through Bad Boy Records and distributed by Arista Records. The album was the second full-length release on Bad Boy, following the Notorious B.I.G.'s Ready to Die one week earlier. Propelled by the success of the platinum RIAA-selling hit single "Flava in Ya Ear," the album reached gold-RIAA sales status on February 22, 1995. "Flava in Ya Ear" also featured a successful remix (not included on the album), featuring guest verses from the Notorious B.I.G., Busta Rhymes, Rampage and LL Cool J. The album's second single, "Get Down," was Mack's second top 40 hit in 1994 and achieved gold sales status in the United States in April 1995.

Though commercially successful and acclaimed at the time of its release, the album was overshadowed by the massive success of Ready to Die, and Mack quickly lost public image, releasing only one other album, the commercially unsuccessful Operation: Get Down, in 1997.

== Critical reception ==
Professional ratings
Review scores
Source	Rating
AllMusic	4/5 stars
Robert Christgau	(3-star Honorable Mention)
The Encyclopedia of Popular Music	3/5 stars
RapReviews	6.5/10

The Encyclopedia of Popular Music called Project: Funk da World "a laid back party record." Robert Christgau deemed the album "Biz Markie as postgangsta." Trouser Press called the album "a likable blend of non-gangsta words and unleaded modern grooves buoyed by the late-summer success of 'Flava in Ya Ear,' an upbeat anthem vague enough to suit a broad range of funk fans."

== Track listing ==
All tracks are written by Craig Mack.

No.	Title	Producer(s)	Length
1.	"Flava in Ya Ear"	Easy Mo Bee	3:37
2.	"Get Down"	Easy Mo Bee	4:27
3.	"Making Moves with Puff" (featuring Puff Daddy)	Rashad Smith	4:25
4.	"That Y'all"	Mack, Lenny Marrow	5:07
5.	"Project: Funk da World"	Mack	4:22
6.	"Funk wit da Style"	Mack, Marrow	4:55
7.	"Judgement Day"	Easy Mo Bee	3:49
8.	"Real Raw"	Mack	4:01
9.	"Mainline"	Easy Mo Bee	4:34
10.	"When God Comes"	Easy Mo Bee	4:11
11.	"Welcome to 1994"	Mack	5:32
Total length:			49:04

== Album singles ==
Single information
"Flava in Ya Ear"
- Released: July 2, 1994
- B-side: "Shinika"
"Get Down"
- Released: December 12, 1994
- B-side: "Flava in Ya Ear (Remix)"

== Charts ==
=== Weekly charts ===
Chart (1994)	Peak position
US Billboard 200	21
US Top R&B/Hip-Hop Albums (Billboard)	6

=== Year-end charts ===
Chart (1994)	Position
US Top R&B/Hip-Hop Albums (Billboard)	82
Chart (1995)	Position
US Top R&B/Hip-Hop Albums (Billboard)	71

=== Singles chart positions ===
Year	Song	Chart positions				
Year	Song	Billboard Hot 100	Hot R&B/Hip-Hop Singles & Tracks	Hot Rap Singles	Hot Dance Music/Maxi-Singles Sales	Rhythmic Top 40
1994	"Flava in Ya Ear"	#9	#4	#1	#1	#24
1994	"Get Down/Making Moves with Puff"	#38	#17	#2	#2	-

== Certifications ==
Region	Certification	Certified units/sales
United States (RIAA)	Gold	500,000^{^}
^{^} Shipments figures based on certification alone.
