= Operation: Get Down =

Studio album by Craig Mack
- Released: June 24, 1997
- Recorded: November 1996 – March 1997
- Studio: Santa Monica Sound Recorders (Santa Monica, California)
- Genre: Hip hop
- Length: 56:48
- Labels: Street Life; Scotti Brothers; WEA
- Producers: Eric B. (also exec.); Al West; Demarie "Meech" Sheki; Johnny "J"; Prince Markie Dee; Ty Fyffe

Craig Mack chronology
Project: Funk da World (1994)	Operation: Get Down (1997)	The Mack World Sessions (2017)

Singles from Operation: Get Down
- 1. "What I Need" Released: April 21, 1997; 2. "Jockin' My Style" Released: February 8, 1998

Professional ratings
Review scores
Source	Rating
AllMusic	3/5 stars
RapReviews	7.5/10

Operation: Get Down is the second studio album by American rapper Craig Mack. It was released on June 24, 1997, through Street Life Records. Recording sessions took place at Santa Monica Sound Recorders in California. Production was handled by Al West, Demarie "Meech" Sheki, Prince Markie Dee, Johnny "J", Ty Fyffe, and Eric B., who also served as executive producer. It features contributions from Demarie Sheki, PJ DeMarks, La Shawn Monet and Natasha Barr. The album peaked at number 46 on the Billboard 200 and number 17 on the Top R&B/Hip-Hop Albums chart in the United States. Its lead single "What I Need" was a minor success reaching #103 on the Billboard Hot 100 and #55 on the Hot R&B/Hip-Hop Songs.

== Track listing ==
No.	Title	Writer(s)	Producer(s)	Length
1.	"Jockin' My Style"	Mack; Tyrone Fyffe	Sugarless	4:45
2.	"What I Need" (featuring Meech and PJ DeMarks)	Mack	Demarie "Meech" Sheki	4:07
3.	"Can You Still Love Me" (featuring Natasha Barr)	Craig Mack; Sherwin Charles; Jeff Freeman; Marc Nelson	Eric B.; "Jammin'" James Carter^{[o]}	4:39
4.	"Rap Hangover" (featuring La Shawn Monet)	Mack; Johnny Jackson; Marilyn McLeod; Pamela Sawyer	Johnny "J"	4:00
5.	"Sit Back & Relax" (featuring Meech and PJ DeMarks)	Mack; Raphael Wiggins; Timothy Christian Riley; Norman Durham; Woodrow Cunningham Jr.	Al West; Prince Markie Dee	5:17
6.	"Do You See" (featuring Meech and PJ DeMarks)	Mack	Demarie "Meech" Sheki	4:58
7.	"Put It on You" (featuring Meech)	Mack	Demarie "Meech" Sheki	4:58
8.	"Rock da Party"	Mack; Kurtis Walker; David Reeves; Salvatore Abbatiello; William Waring	Al West; Prince Markie Dee	3:58
9.	"Today's Forecast"	Mack; Fyffe	Sugarless	4:19
10.	"Style"	Mack; Gabriel Jackson	Al West; Prince Markie Dee	4:37
11.	"You!"	Mack; J. Jackson	Johnny "J"	4:10
12.	"Drugs, Guns and Thugs"	Mack	Demarie "Meech" Sheki	5:19
13.	"Prime Time Live"	Mack	Al West; Prince Markie Dee	1:44
Total length:				56:48

Notes

- ^{^[o]} signifies an original producer.

Sample credits

- Track 1 contains a sample from "Here We Go" written by Minnie Riperton, Richard Rudolph and Art Phillips as recorded by Minnie Riperton and Peabo Bryson.
- Track 4 contains an interpolation of "Love Hangover" written by Marilyn McLeod and Pamela Sawyer.
- Track 5 contains a sample from "Inmate Connection" written by Norman Durham and Woody Cunningham as recorded by Kleeer, and also contains an interpolation of "It Never Rains (In Southern California)" written by Raphael Saadiq and Timothy Christian Riley.
- Track 8 contains a sample from "Games People Play" written by Kurtis Blow, David Reeves, Sal Abbatiello and William Waring as recorded by Sweet G.
- Track 10 contains a sample from "Spoonin' Rap" written by Gabriel Jackson as recorded by Spoonie Gee.

== Charts ==
Chart (1997)	Peak position
US Billboard 200	46
US Top R&B/Hip-Hop Albums (Billboard)	17
