= Get Down (Craig Mack song) =

1994 single by Craig Mack

Single by Craig Mack

from the album Project: Funk da World
- Released: December 12, 1994
- Recorded: 1994
- Genre: Hip hop
- Length: 4:27
- Label: Bad Boy; Arista
- Songwriter: Craig Mack
- Producers: Easy Mo Bee; Q-Tip (Remix)

Craig Mack singles chronology
"Flava in Ya Ear (Remix)" (1994)	"Get Down" (1994)	"Making Moves With Puff" (1995)

Music video
- "Get Down" on YouTube

"Get Down" is the second single released from American rapper Craig Mack's debut album, Project: Funk da World (1994).

== Background ==
"Get Down" was released as the follow-up to his platinum-selling single "Flava in Ya Ear", which peaked at 9 on the Billboard Hot 100. While it did not match the success of "Flava in Ya Ear", "Get Down" nevertheless became a top 40 hit on the Hot 100, peaking at No. 38 on the chart. The song was produced by Easy Mo Bee, with an additional remix that was produced by Q-Tip, who also provided a guest verse. "Get Down" was certified gold by the Recording Industry Association of America for sales of 500,000 copies on April 5, 1995.

The music video was directed by Hype Williams.

== Track listing ==
1. "Get Down" (Club Mix) – 3:50
2. "Flava in Ya Ear" (featuring Busta Rhymes, LL Cool J, The Notorious B.I.G. and Rampage) (Remix) – 5:02
3. "Get Down" (radio edit) – 3:57
4. "Get Down" (instrumental) – 3:53

== Charts ==
=== Weekly charts ===
Chart (1994–1995)	Peak position
US Billboard Hot 100	38
US Hot R&B/Hip-Hop Songs (Billboard)	17
US Cash Box Top 100	45

=== Year-end charts ===
Chart (1995)	Position
US Hot R&B/Hip-Hop Songs (Billboard)	69

== Certifications ==
Region	Certification	Certified units/sales
United States (RIAA)	Gold	500,000^{^}
^{^} Shipments figures based on certification alone.
