= Devils and Angels (song) =

2003 single by Toby Lightman

Single by Toby Lightman

from the album Little Things
- Released: December 2, 2003
- Genre: Pop rock
- Length: 3:54
- Label: Lava
- Songwriter: Toby Lightman

Toby Lightman singles chronology
| "Devils and Angels" (2003) | "Everyday" (2004) |

Music video
- "Devils and Angels" on YouTube

"Devils and Angels" is a song written and performed by Toby Lightman, issued as the first single from her first studio album Little Things. The song was originally released on December 2, 2003 leading to a peak position of #17 on the Billboard adult top 40 chart. It was re-released on December 7, 2004.

== Music video ==
The official music video for the song was directed by Liz Friedlander.

== Chart positions ==
| Chart (2003) | Peak position |
|---|---|
| US Adult Top 40 (Billboard) | 17 |
