= Everyday (Toby Lightman song) =

Single by Toby Lightman

from the album Little Things
- Released: May 4, 2004
- Recorded: 2003
- Genre: Pop rock
- Length: 3:46
- Label: Lava
- Songwriter(s): Toby Lightman

Toby Lightman singles chronology
"Devils and Angels" (2003)	"Everyday" (2004)	"Real Love" (2004)

"Everyday" is a song by written and performed by Toby Lightman, issued as the second single from her debut studio album Little Things. The song was used during the sixth season of the FOX television series Bones, in the episode "The Couple in the Cave".
