= Bird on a Wire (Toby Lightman album) =

Studio album by Toby Lightman
- Released: July 25, 2006
- Studio: Henson Studios, Los Angeles, CA.
- Genre: Pop; Rock
- Length: 50:56
- Label: Lava
- Producer: Bill Bottrell; Patrick Leonard

Toby Lightman chronology
Little Things (2004)	Bird on a Wire (2006)	Let Go (2008)

Professional ratings
Review scores
Source	Rating
Okayplayer	4.5/5 stars
AllMusic	4/5 stars
PopMatters	5/10 stars

Bird on a Wire is the second full-length studio album released by Lava recording artist Toby Lightman. The album peaked at No. 30 on Billboard's Heatseekers Albums chart on 11 August 2006.

== Critical reception ==
Candace L. of Okayplayer begins her review with, "The sophomore effort from Toby Lightman is an exciting mix of country blues, rock and R&B.; Filled with insightful lyrics and mature pop, Lightman refuses to be pigeonholed by her teenybopper appearance, skillfully genre-jumping with the confidence of a veteran"

Marisa Brown of AllMusic writes, "Bird on a Wire's an impressive piece of work from a talented artist who's grown completely into her voice and herself, subtly complex while still retaining the passion and immediacy that makes it such a good listen, touching listeners emotionally as well as intellectually, a feat that's truly hard to attain and absolutely deserves to be praised."

Mike Joseph of PopMatters says, "Bird on a Wire, Lightman’s sophomore effort, doesn’t deviate much from the formula of her debut. Most of the songs sound tailor-made for adult alternative radio. They have a mature, yet still pop-friendly sound. Again, some of the songs have a pronounced R&B element."

- See original reviews for full articles. Links can be found in the references section of this article.

== Track listing ==
All tracks are written by Toby Lightman, unless otherwise noted.

No.	Title	Writer(s)	Length
1.	"Don't Wake Me"		3:40
2.	"Don't Let Go"	Toby Lightman; Patrick Leonard	3:56
3.	"Better"		3:55
4.	"Slippin'"		4:25
5.	"Round & Round"	Toby Lightman; Patrick Leonard	3:30
6.	"My Sweet Song"	Toby Lightman; Peter Zizzo	4:01
7.	"Alone"	Toby Lightman; David Harris	3:40
8.	"One Sure Thing"	Toby Lightman; Patrick Leonard	4:04
9.	"Overflowing"	Toby Lightman; Joseph Hanna	3:33
10.	"Weight of the World"	Toby Lightman; Stuart Matthewman	4:02
11.	"Holding Me Down"	Toby Lightman; Patrick Leonard	3:18
12.	"I'd Be Lost"	Toby Lightman; Patrick Leonard	3:49
13.	"Good Find"		5:03
Total length:			50:56

Bonus Tracks
No.	Title	Writer(s)	Length
14.	"Front Row (Live)"	Toby Lightman; Aaron Albano	3:49
15.	"Alone (Slow Mix)"	Toby Lightman; David Harris	4:18
Total length:			59:03

== Musicians ==
- Bill Bottrell – bells, chimes, e-bow, acoustic guitar, electric guitar, drum loops, mellotron, moog synthesizer, organ, pedal steel guitar, piano, string arrangements, synthesizer, Wurlitzer
- Paul Bushnell – bass guitar
- Caroline Campbell – violin
- James Freebarin-Smith – cello
- Neel Hammond – violin
- Joseph Hanna – drums, percussion
- Patrick Leonard – keyboards, lap steel guitar, piano, programming
- Toby Lightman – dobro, acoustic guitar, electric guitar, lap steel guitar, string arrangements, lead vocals, background vocals
- Brian Macleod – drums, percussion
- Justin Meldal-Johnsen – bass guitar
- Wendy Melvoin – bass guitar, electric guitar
- Han Oh – viola
- Tim Pierce – dobro, e-bow, acoustic guitar, electric guitar, mandolin
- Dan Schwartz – bass guitar
- Shari Freebairn Smith – violin
- Lyle Workman – electric guitar

== Production ==
- A&R Direction – Andy Karp
- Engineer – Michael Perfitt
- Product Manager – Gregg Nadel
- Art Direction, Illustration & Design – Mark Obriski
- Art Producer, Photography – Andrew Zaeh
- Packaging Manager – Nick Romei
- Engineer – Michael Perfitt
- Mastering – Scott Hull
- Mixing – Kevin Killen

Track information and credits verified from the album's liner notes. Some information was adapted from Discogs and AllMusic.
