= Horace Brown (musician) =

American contemporary R&B singer

Horace Brown (born in Hartford, Connecticut) is an American R&B singer. He is the son of an Apostolic minister.

== Life and career ==
Brown played a variety of instruments in his school's marching band and got a break when DeVante Swing of Jodeci heard one of his demos. He then earned spots doing background vocals for Christopher Williams and some writing and producing (Terri & Monica's Systa album). He then managed to get a recording contract with Uptown Records after president Andre Harrell saw him in a recording session.

In 1994, while with Uptown Records, he recorded his first album and spurred controversy when his single "Taste Your Love" was released. The single was an ode to oral sex and was banned in parts of the South. Despite the press around the single, it failed to perform well on the charts. One more single ("Let Me Know") was released as a promotional 12", but was cancelled as his Uptown Records album was shelved.

When Andre Harrell of Uptown moved to Motown, he brought Brown with him. Motown promoted Brown by releasing two more singles ("One for the Money" and "Things We Do for Love") and in 1996, released his self-titled debut album. The album featured Sean "Puffy" Combs and remixes featured Foxy Brown and Jay-Z. The album's final single was "How Can We Stop" featuring Faith Evans, although three more songs ("Why Why Why", "I Want You Baby" and "Trippin") were released as promotional 12" singles.

Since the release of his debut album, Brown has done a couple of collaborations with artists such as Naudy, Mr. Cheeks, Lisha, Royal Flush and PrinZe Gabriel.

In 2000, he released a single "Shake It Up" on the international label Double H Production with Cut Killer. The following year, he released another single "This Is the One" on Money Talks Entertainment with rapper Styles P.

As of 2013, he toured overseas with Keith Sweat and other R&B artists. He has also joined the upcoming reality series, Come Back Kings, with Ed Lover, Calvin Richardson, David "Davinch" Chance (of Ruff Endz), Jeff Sanders, Jameio, Mr. Cheeks and Black Rob.

== Discography ==
=== Albums ===
Year	Album	Chart positions	
Year	Album	US	US R&B
1996	Horace Brown	145	18

=== Singles ===
Year	Song	Chart positions					Album
Year	Song	US Hot 100	US R&B	US Dance	NZ	UK	Album
1994	"Taste Your Love"	-	38	-	-	58	Horace Brown
1996	"One for the Money"	62	14	12	8	12	Horace Brown
1996	"Things We Do for Love"	95	40	13	-	27	Horace Brown
1996	"How Can We Stop" (feat. Faith Evans)	-	77	-	-	-	Horace Brown
2001	"Shake It Up"	-	-	-	-	-	Non-album single
2001	"This Is the One" (featuring Styles P)	-	-	-	-	-	Non-album single

=== Collaborations ===
- "This Christmas" (with missjones) (1994)
- "Party Naughty" (with Naudy) (1998)
- "Friday Night" (with Mr. Cheeks) (2001)
- "I Want That" (with Lisha) (2007)
- "Never Should've" (with Royal Flush) (2008)
- "Rock the Party" (with PrinZe Gabriel) (2013)
