= Intro (group) =

American contemporary R&B group

- Origin: Brooklyn, New York City, United States
- Genres: R&B, soul
- Occupations: R&B group
- Instrument: Vocals
- Years active: 1990–1997; 2012–2015; 2019–present
- Labels: Atlantic Records (1992–1997); Innovative Entertainment (2012–2015); Introcity Music (2019–present)
- Members: Clinton "Buddy" Wike; Jeff Sanders; Tao Soprano
- Past members: Kenny Greene (deceased); Nelson Brown

Intro is an American R&B trio from Brooklyn, New York City, New York & Queens, New York. The trio consisted of members Jeff Sanders, Clinton "Buddy" Wike and lead singer/songwriter Kenny Greene. Formed in 1990, the group was discovered by DJ Eddie F, who signed the group to Untouchables Entertainment, and struck a deal with Atlantic Records in 1992. The group name is an acronym for "Innovative New Talent Reaching Out".

The group had a string of US hits in the 1990s. Releasing two albums – 1993's Intro and 1995's New Life – they included the singles "Love Thang", "Let Me Be the One", a cover of Stevie Wonder's "Ribbon in the Sky", "Funny How Time Flies" and their highest-charting hit, "Come Inside". They additionally appeared on the Eddie F and the Untouchables collaboration album entitled Let's Get It On (in 1994), where their song "Never Again" was released as a single.

They went on hiatus in 1997. Lead singer Greene, who had already penned early hits for Mary J. Blige, continued to write for other artists, like Soul For Real, Men of Vizion, Jason Weaver, Father MC, Tha Truth, The Real Seduction, Christopher Williams, Will Smith, Cam'ron, 98 Degrees, Changing Faces and Tyrese. He later died in 2001, after suffering with AIDS. The last song Greene recorded was singing background vocals on the song “For Always” on Tyrese’s album 2000 Watts. He sang background vocals on Will Smith's "Chasing Forever" on the Big Willie Style album, which also sampled "Ribbon in the Sky."

In recent years, they have reformed, released new music and continue to tour worldwide as a duo.

On January 8, 2025, It was announced that singer Tao Soprano (formerly of fellow 90s R&B group Dru Hill) will be joining the group as their new lead singer.

== Discography ==
=== Albums ===
List of albums, with selected chart positions
Title	Album details	Peak chart positions		Certifications
Title	Album details	US	US R&B	Certifications
Intro	Released: March 16, 1993; Label: Atlantic; Format: CD, LP, cassette	65	11	RIAA: Gold
New Life	Released: October 27, 1995; Label: Atlantic; Format: CD, cassette	86	16	

=== Singles ===
List of singles, with selected chart positions
Title	Year	Peak chart positions		Album
Title	Year	US	US R&B	Album
"Love Thang"	1993	— (Note: "Love Thang" did not enter the Billboard Hot 100, but peaked at number 11 on the Bubbling Under Hot 100 chart.)	28	Intro
"Let Me Be the One"	1993	— (Note: "Let Me Be the One" did not enter the Billboard Hot 100, but peaked at number 12 on the Bubbling Under Hot 100 chart.)	23	Intro
"Come Inside"	1993	33	9	Intro
"Ribbon in the Sky"	1994	— (Note: "Ribbon in the Sky" did not enter the Billboard Hot 100, but peaked at number 5 on the Bubbling Under Hot 100 chart.)	11	Intro
"Never Again"	1994	—	60	Let's Get It On
"Funny How Time Flies"	1995	90	25	New Life
"Feels Like the First Time"	1996	— (Note: "Feels Like the First Time" did not enter the Billboard Hot 100, but peaked at number 17 on the Bubbling Under Hot 100 chart.)	19	New Life
"I Didn't Sleep with Her"	2013	—	—	Non-album singles
"Lucky"	2014	—	—	Non-album singles
"Lose Control"	2015	—	—	Non-album singles
"Higher"	2021	—	—	Non-album singles
"—" denotes releases that did not chart.
