= Lovebug Starski =

American hip hop musician (1960–2018)

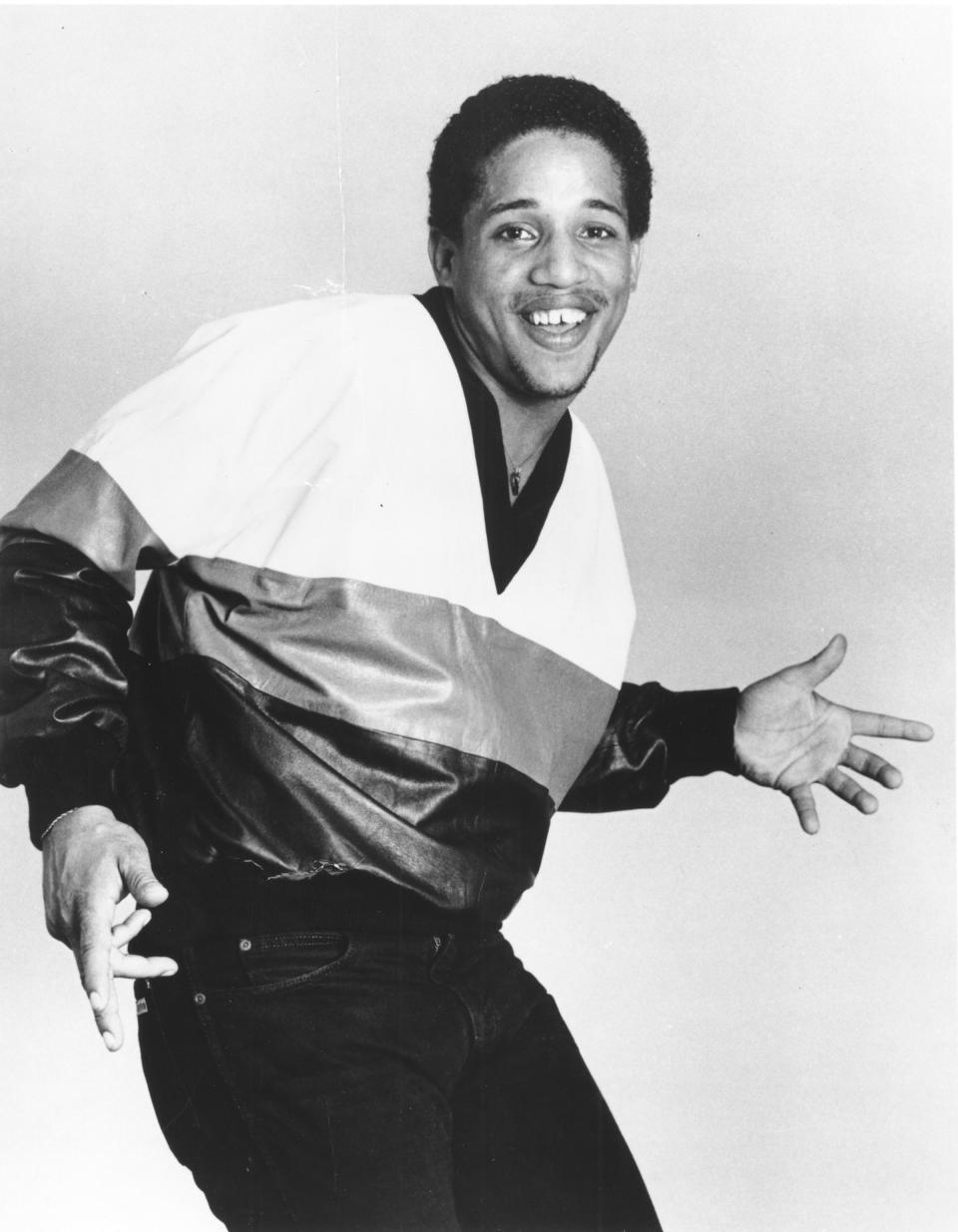

Background information
- Born: Kevin Smith; May 16, 1960; The Bronx, New York City, U.S.
- Died: February 8, 2018 (aged 57) Las Vegas, Nevada, U.S.
- Genres: Hip hop
- Occupations: Rapper; DJ; record producer
- Years active: 1971–2018

Kevin Smith (May 16, 1960 – February 8, 2018), best known by his stage name Lovebug Starski, was an American MC, musician, and record producer. He began his career as a record boy in 1971 as hip-hop first appeared in the Bronx, and he eventually became a DJ at the Disco Fever club in 1978. He is one of two people who may have come up with the term "hip-hop". Starski claimed that he coined the phrase, while trading the two words back and forth, while improvising lines with Keef Cowboy of Grandmaster Flash and the Furious Five, at a farewell party for a friend who was headed into the Army. In an interview with Dave Hill in the newspaper The Observer, Starski explained, "I picked up the mic and just started saying 'a hip hop, hip hop, de hibbyhibbyhibbyhibby hop'. The people couldn't believe it but it stuck."

== Career ==
Starski recorded his first single, "Positive Life", on the Tayster record label in 1981. (The British Group MARRS would sample this in 1987 with the No. 1 single "Pump Up the Volume".) Later, he recorded a song for the soundtrack of the 1986 film Rappin', which was released on Atlantic Records, before recording his first album, House Rocker, on Epic/CBS Records. This featured his most successful chart single, "Amityville (The House on the Hill)", a parody song named in reference to the film The Amityville Horror (itself based on alleged supernatural activities surrounding the DeFeo murder case). It was a No. 12 hit on the UK Singles Chart in 1986. Lovebug Starski sank into cocaine dependency and was imprisoned for possession of illegal substances in 1987. On release in December 1991, he returned to a DJ residency at his former haunt Disco Fever.

Lovebug Starski and World Famous Brucie B, also worked together at the Rooftop Roller Rink in Harlem during the 1980s. Starski's name is forever immortalized in the opening verse of The Notorious B.I.G.'s legendary 1994 single "Juicy". In a line filled with unintentional irony, Biggie asks, "Who ever thought that hip-hop would take it this far?" while also giving credit to some of the foundational DJs in hip-hop. "Peace to Ron G, Brucie B, Kid Capri, Funkmaster Flex, Lovebug Starski."

== Death ==
Starski died of a heart attack in Las Vegas on February 8, 2018, at the age of 57, while moving speakers out of storage into his apartment. Smith had recently relocated to Las Vegas, where he was working to revive his DJ career with gigs that included a weekly residency at a rooftop lounge of an Indian restaurant. His final appearance there was just hours before his death, according to his manager Jeremy Crittenden. He is survived by his mother Martha Bowes; two sisters Kim Shaw and Karen Rivers; three daughters, Tiffany Williams, Shantel Williams and Bryanna Smith; three granddaughters and a grandson.

== Discography ==
=== Albums ===
- House Rocker (1986)

=== Singles ===
- "Gangster Rock" (1979) (as Little Starsky)
- "Dancin' Party People" (1981) (as Little Starsky)
- "Positive Life" (1981) (with Harlem World Crew)
- "Live at the Fever" (1983)
- "Live at the Fever Pt.2" (1983)
- "You've Gotta Believe" (1983)
- "Do the Right Thing" (1984)
- "House Rocker" (1985)
- "Rappin'" (1985)
- "Amityville (The House on the Hill)" (1986)
- "Saturday Night" (1986)
