= Reminisce (song) =

1992 single by Mary J. Blige

Single by Mary J. Blige

from the album What's the 411?
- B-side: "Leave a Message"
- Released: October 13, 1992
- Genre: R&B; new jack swing
- Length: 5:24
- Label: Uptown; MCA
- Songwriters: Kenny Greene; Dave Hall
- Producer: Dave "Jam" Hall

Mary J. Blige singles chronology
"Real Love" (1992)	"Reminisce" (1992)	"Dolly My Baby" (1993)

Music video
- "Reminisce" on YouTube

"Reminisce" is a song by American singer and songwriter Mary J. Blige from her debut album, What's the 411? (1992). It was co-written by Kenny Greene and Dave "Jam" Hall, who also produced it. Described as a new jack swing song inspired by 1970s soul music, it contains a sample of "Stop, Look, Listen" (1989) by American rapper MC Lyte. The single was released in October 1992, by Uptown and MCA Records, peaking at numbers 57 and 58 on the US Billboard Hot 100 and Cash Box Top 100 charts, and number six on the Billboard Hot R&B Singles chart. A more uptempo and hip hop-inspired remix of the song, featuring duo Pete Rock & CL Smooth, later appeared on Blige's 1993 remix album of the same name. The accompanying music video was directed by Marcus Raboy.

== Critical reception ==
In a retrospective review, Daryl McIntosh from Albumism said that the song followed what seemed to be Combs' formula for the Yonkers native, "by revolving around another '80s hip-hop sample, this time from Audio Two's close associate and femcee rhyme titan MC Lyte's "Stop, Look, and Listen". The Daily Vault's Mark Millan described it as "a slick, Whitney-esque R&B track that gives Blige a chance to prove she can sing just as well as rap." In his weekly UK chart commentary, James Masterton commented, "All of a sudden soul is making a comeback, helped in part perhaps by a new show on Radio 1 on Wednesday nights devoted to the music. "Reminisce" thus becomes another in a long line of New Jack Swing tracks to chart in this region although none have gone on to major success." Andy Beevers from Music Week gave the song a score of four out of five. The RM Dance Update complimented it as "superb". An editor from The Observer remarked that it hinted at "the loss and melancholy behind much of hip hop's aggression". Jonathan Bernstein from Spin praised its "irresistible bounce".

== Music video ==
The music video for "Reminisce" was directed by American film and music video director Marcus Raboy. It opens with Mary J. Blige struggling to sleep in a bed during a storm. She later performs in the doorway of a large room with gray walls. Throughout the video, a man sometimes appears. "Reminisce" was later made available by Vevo on YouTube in 2009, and had generated more than 9.1 million views as of May 2025.

== Legacy ==
In June 1994, "Reminisce" won one of ASCAP's R&B Music Awards.

== Tracklisting ==
- US cassette single
- US 7-inch single
1. "Reminisce" (Radio version) – 4:30
2. "Reminisce" (Instrumental) – 5:17
- US cassette maxi-single
- US CD maxi-single
- US 12-inch single
1. "Reminisce" (Bad Boy Remix) – 5:14
2. "Reminisce" (Bad Boy Instrumental) – 5:15
3. "Reminisce" (Audio 2 Remix) – 5:24
4. "Reminisce" (Milky Mix) – 5:24
5. "Reminisce" (Stringapella) – 5:22
- European CD single
1. "Reminisce" (Bad Boy Remix) – 5:14
2. "Reminisce" (Pressure Point 12-inch) – 4:30
3. "Reminisce" (Milky Mix) – 5:24
4. "Leave a Message" (Album version) – 3:37
- UK cassette single
1. "Reminisce" (Driza Radio) – 3:37
2. "Reminisce" (Album Edit) – 4:13
- UK CD single
1. "Reminisce" (Driza Radio) – 3:37
2. "Reminisce" (Album Edit) – 4:13
3. "Reminisce" (Bad Boy Remix) – 5:14
4. "Reminisce" (Drizabone 12-inch) – 5:34
5. "Reminisce" (Audio 2 Remix) – 5:24
- UK 12-inch single
1. "Reminisce" (Drizabone 12-inch) – 5:34
2. "Reminisce" (Drizabone instrumental) – 5:17
3. "Reminisce" (Bad Boy Remix) – 5:14
4. "Reminisce" (Album Edit) – 4:13
- UK 12-inch single (Remix)
1. "Reminisce" (Pressure Point 12-inch)
2. "Reminisce" (Pressure Point Dub)
3. "Reminisce" (Audio 2 Remix)
4. "Reminisce" (Milky Mix)

== Personnel ==
Personnel are adapted from the What's the 411? liner notes.

- Sean "Puffy" Combs – executive production, co-production
- Charlie Davis – executive production
- Dave "Jam" Hall – production
- Kurt Woodley – executive production

== Charts ==
=== Weekly charts ===
Chart (1992–1993)	Peak position
Australia (ARIA)	192
Europe (European Dance Radio)	7
UK Singles (Official Charts)	31
UK Airplay (Music Week)	45
UK Dance (Music Week)	3
US Billboard Hot 100	57
US Dance Singles Sales (Billboard)	5
US Hot R&B/Hip-Hop Songs (Billboard)	6
US Rhythmic Airplay (Billboard)	34
US Cash Box Top 100	58

=== Year-end charts ===
Chart (1993)	Position
US Hot R&B Singles (Billboard)	34
