= MeccaGodZilla =

- Also known as: RYU BLACK; RAVAGE
- Born: Mike Dottin; August 13, 1978 (age 47); Brooklyn
- Genres: Hip hop
- Occupations: Underground rapper, visual artist, record producer and entrepreneur
- Labels: Backwoodz Studioz; Manafest Vision Media
- Website: meccagodzilla.com

Mike Dottin (born August 13, 1978), also known by the stage names MeccaGodZilla, RYU BLACK or RAVAGE is an American underground rapper, visual artist, record producer and entrepreneur formerly of the Monsta Island Czars.

== Early life and career ==
MeccaGodZilla was born in Brooklyn and raised in Freeport, Long Island. In 1998 he entered the music business while attending Hunter College and under the tutiledge of Omowale Adewale & M-1 (rapper) of dead prez, he became a founding member of G.A.ME (Grassroots Artists MovEment) in 2000 as head of the promotions and networking department.

In 2010, he moved to Tokyo and modeled for Japanese brands collab with Nike and worked with Armani Exchange. Later, in 2011, he founded indie record label "Manafest Vision Media".

== Discography ==
SoundClash #1: MeccaGodZilla Vs. 007

- Released: 2005
- Format: CD
- Label: Backwoodz Studioz

American Monsta - The Jay-Z American Gangster Remix

- Released: 2008
- Format: Album
- Label: Manafest Vision Media

MeccaGodZilla "ERROARS"

- Released: 2008
- Format: Album
- Label: Manafest Vision Media

Jaysage & MeccaGodZilla "Mike Marvelous"

- Released: 2009
- Label: Manafest Vision Media

"PERFECT 天: The Ryu Black Musical

- Released: 2011
- Format: Album
- Label: Manafest Vision Media MeccaGodZilla "ERROARS 2.2: Metal Sakura"

MeccaGodZilla "ERROARS 2.2: Metal Sakura"

- Released: 2014
- Format: Album
- Label: Manafest Vision Media

== Appearances ==
- 2004 – Rodan – War in Heaven Pt. I, War in Heaven Pt. II, and Human Inquisition from Theophany: The Book Of Elevations
- 2005 – “Hasan Salaam – Paradise Lost” Album A&R
- 2006 – “Day By Day” ft Mez & Majesty on Hasan Salaam – Tales Of The Lost Tribe: Hidden Jewels
- 2006 – MF Grimm - "The Path", "M.I.C.", "Brand New" from "American Hunger"
- 2008 – Eric Bobo "Tread" ft Keen from "Meeting of the Minds Vol I" - Nacional Records
- 2008 – Kong - Broken Safety, It's Official, Brown Eyes, What Had Happened Was, Ultimate Sacrifice, Slumz, War, Hated from “Shackles Off”
- 2008 –Vordul Mega - "Learn" from "Megagraphiti" - Backwoodz Studioz
- 2009 - Mega Ran "My Love" from "Mega Ran 9" - RandomBeats, LLC
- 2009 - Junclassic "Bionic 6" from "Imaginary Enemies" - Classified Records LLC
- 2011 – Sick Team "Tokyo Driftin" from Sick Team” - Jazzysport / Japan
- 2011 - Budamunk "Seven MCs" from "Blunted Monkey Fist" - King Tone / Japan
- 2012 - Masia One "Interlude - Broadway Culture" from "Bootleg Culture" - Merdeka Media Group
- 2014 - Sim-E "Bang²" from "Sim-City" - Manafest Vision Media LLC.
- 2019 - Cryptik Soul "Body In The Trunk" from "Killer's Blood" - Crypt Keeper Music
