= Dave Hall (music producer) =

American record producer

Dave "Jam" Hall
- Also known as: Jam
- Occupation: Record producer
- Years active: 1992–present
- Spouse: Wanda Sykes (m. 1991; div. 1998)

David "Jam" Hall is an American record producer. He first became known for his production work on Mariah Carey's 1993 single "Dreamlover", which topped the Billboard Hot 100. The year prior, he was credited on Mary J. Blige's debut album What's the 411? (1992), namely on its singles "You Remind Me", "Reminisce" and "Love No Limit".

He was further credited with similar roles on releases including Madonna's album Bedtime Stories (1994), Brownstone's 1994 single "If You Love Me", and Carey's 1995 single "Fantasy"—his second Billboard Hot 100-number one production. Hall has also produced for Usher, Donell Jones, CeCe Peniston, and Joe early in their respective careers.

He was also a remixer for "Scream" (1995) by Michael and Janet Jackson, and "Goldeneye" for Tina Turner that same year. He was married to comedienne Wanda Sykes from 1991 to 1998.

== Production discography ==
Brand Nubian – One For All (1990)

- Try To Do Me

Heavy D. & the Boyz – Peaceful Journey (1991)

- Body and Mind (produced with Nevelle Hodge)

Strictly Business- Original Motion Picture Soundtrack (1991)

- Stephanie Mills – I Just Want Love
- Jeff Redd – You Called and Told Me
- Mary J. Blige – You Remind Me

Stephanie Mills – Something Real (1992)

- I Just Want Love

Shinehead – Sidewalk University (1992)

- Try My Love

Father MC – Close to You (1992)

- All I Want

Mary J. Blige – What's the 411? (1992)

- Reminisce
- You Remind Me
- Love No Limit
- My Love

Intro – Intro (1993)

- Let Me Be the One
- It's All About You
- So Many Reasons

Joe – Everything (1993)

- Baby Don't Stop

Mariah Carey – Music Box (1993)

- Dreamlover

Jomanda – Nubia Soul (1993)

- Back to You
- Tonight's the Night

Eddie F. and the Untouchables – Let's Get It On (1994)

- Intro- Never Again
- Porche (band) – Make You Feel Real Good

Changing Faces – Changing Faces (1994)

- Am I Wasting My Time

Jade – Mind, Body & Song (1994)

- If the Mood Is Right
- If the Lovin' Ain't Good

Usher – Usher (1994)

- The Many Ways
- Final Goodbye

Brownstone – From the Bottom Up (1994)

- Grapevyne
- If You Love Me

Madonna – Bedtime Stories (1994)

- I'd Rather Be Your Lover
- Human Nature
- Love Tried to Welcome Me

Intro – New Life (1995)

- Funny How Time Flies
- My Love's on the Way

Silk – Silk (1995)

- Now That I've Lost You

Phyllis Hyman – I Refuse to Be Lonely (1995)

- It's Not About You (It's About Me)

Mariah Carey – Daydream (1995)

- Fantasy
- Slipping Away (B-side to the single "Always Be My Baby")

Horace Brown – Horace Brown (1996)

- Taste Your Love
- I Like
- Gotta Find a Way

Kenny Lattimore – Kenny Lattimore (1996)

- Never Too Busy
- I Won't Let You Down

Assorted Phlavors – Assorted Phlavors (1996)

- Tell Me
- Hiding Place
- Trust
- What Ya Gonna Do (Interlude)
- Patience
- Don't Let Go
- Tonight (Interlude)
- Can't Get You Off My Mind
- Love So Real (Interlude)
- Don't Stop (Interlude)
- Patience (Remix)

CeCe Peniston – I'm Movin' On (1996)

- Movin' On

Brownstone – Still Climbing (1997)

- In the Game of Love

Kurupt – Kuruption! (Disc Two) (1998)

- Who Do U Be (Produced by RJ Rice, additional production and remix by Dave "Jam" Hall)
