= Havelock Nelson (writer) =

American journalist

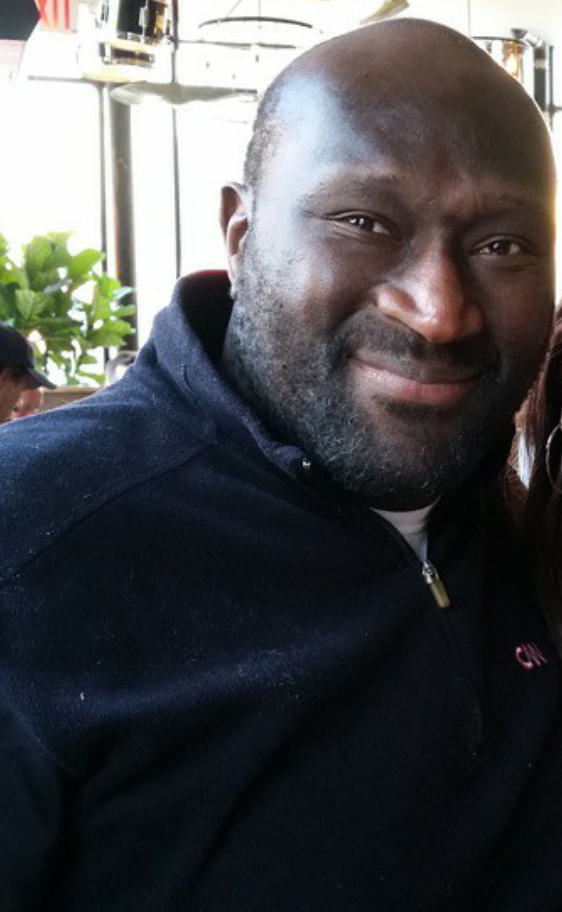
- Nelson in 2015
- Born: May 6, 1964 (age 61); Georgetown, British Guiana
- Education: City University of New York City College
- Occupations: Music journalist, writer
- Years active: 1984–present

Havelock Nelson (born May 6, 1964) is an American music journalist and the co-author of the 1992 book Bring the Noise: A Guide to Rap Music and Hip Hop Culture. Nelson was Billboard magazine's first rap editor where he singled out KMD's sophomore album Black Bastards contending that its artwork and title were offensive. This eventually led to Elektra records shelving the project. Nelson has written stories and reviews for Entertainment Weekly and Rolling Stone magazine and has been a contributor to the Huffington Post.

Nelson has contributed to Vibe's History of Hip Hop (Random House), and been quoted in The New York Times, The Washington Post, and People magazine. He has also appeared twice on TV-One's Unsung, and will host the forthcoming In-Depth with Havelock Nelson which is currently in pre-production.

Prince Paul credits him with having coined the term "horrorcore" for the titular genre.
