= Craig Mack =

American rapper (1970–2018)

Background information
- Born: Craig Jamieson Mack; May 10, 1970; The Bronx, New York City, U.S.
- Origin: Long Island, New York, U.S.
- Died: March 12, 2018 (aged 47) Walterboro, South Carolina, U.S.
- Genre: East Coast hip-hop
- Occupations: Rapper; songwriter; record producer
- Years active: 1988–2006; 2012–2018
- Labels: Mack World; Bad Boy; Scotti Brothers; Street Life; Def Squad; Arista
- Children: 2

Craig Jamieson Mack (May 10, 1970 – March 12, 2018) was an American rapper. He is best known for his tenure with Bad Boy Records, during which he released his 1994 single "Flava in Ya Ear" (1994), which peaked within the Billboard Hot 100's top ten. The song preceded his debut studio album Project: Funk Da World (1994), which spawned his second top 40 single, "Get Down". His second album Operation: Get Down (1997) was released by Scotti Brothers Records.

Later in his life, Mack joined the Overcomer Ministry in South Carolina. Mack died in 2018 from HIV/AIDS at the age of 47.

== Early life ==
Craig Jamieson Mack was born on May 10, 1970 in The Bronx, and raised in Brentwood, Long Island.

== Career ==
He began rapping as a teenager under the name MC EZ. His first single, "Just Rhymin'" backed with "Get Retarded", was released in 1988 via Fresh Records and credited to MC EZ & Troup. Mack became friends with fellow Long Island hip hop act EPMD and eventually went on tour with the duo, doing jobs as a roadie. After a few years without forward movement in his recording career and EPMD's breakup, Alvin Toney introduced him to Sean Combs outside Mecca, a nightclub in Manhattan.

Mack freestyled for Combs, who offered to sign him to his newly founded label, Bad Boy Records, on condition that he rap on the remix of Mary J. Blige's "You Don't Have to Worry", which appeared on What's the 411? Remix (1993).

Mack is best known for his 1994 hit single "Flava in Ya Ear", which was released under his real name. The single topped Billboard's Hot Rap Songs chart for a then-record 14 weeks and was certified platinum within four months. The remix of the single was the breakout appearance of The Notorious B.I.G., as well as one of the first solo appearances by Busta Rhymes. While Mack was technically the first rapper to release music on Bad Boy Records, the success of The Notorious B.I.G.'s debut album Ready to Die, which was released a week before Mack's debut album Project: Funk Da World, overshadowed Mack's early success on the label.

Mack clashed with Combs over creative and financial matters. In April 1996, he filed for bankruptcy in an attempt to get out of his Bad Boy contract while negotiating with Death Row Records; under a settlement he was allowed to leave the label, withdrew the bankruptcy filing and gave Bad Boy a share of his next deal. He abandoned the Death Row plans after the killing of Tupac Shakur in September 1996. Bad Boy has stated that Mack left the label of his own accord and was free to pursue other opportunities. In 1997, Mack released his second album, Operation: Get Down, without Bad Boy; it produced no hit single, and he was unable to repeat his earlier success. There was also animosity between Mack and The Notorious B.I.G., who publicly distanced himself from Mack and took a dig at him on "Big Poppa". In 1995, Combs told The New York Times that "Craig is hip-hop's George Clinton, because his stuff is really off the wall."

In the early 2000s, Mack lived mainly on royalties from "Flava in Ya Ear" while working on a third project, The Mack World Sessions. In 2002, Mack appeared in the music video for Puffy's single "I Need a Girl (Part One)". In 2006, he released the single "Mack Tonight", which did not revive his career. A mixtape of earlier Mack World recordings, Operation Why2K?, appeared in 2012, and The Mack World Sessions, containing 18 previously unreleased tracks, in 2017.

In spring 2007, Mack moved with his two children to Walterboro, South Carolina, and joined the Overcomer Ministry, a secluded Christian commune led by Ralph Gordon Stair that former members, relatives and experts have described as a doomsday cult. Stair had pleaded guilty in 2004 to two misdemeanor counts of assault and battery after two women accused him of rape; he was arrested again in December 2017 on charges including criminal sexual conduct with a minor and died in April 2021 while awaiting trial.

Mack's whereabouts became public in May 2012, when a video from the ministry showed him as a member. Asked by Stair what he used to do, Mack answered "wickedness"; asked what he was doing now, he answered "righteousness".

In May 2016, Mack performed a rap testimony before the congregation, drawing on his 1994 song "When God Comes", in which he affirmed his decision to remain with the ministry and contrasted it with the fate he believed would have awaited him in New York. His children had left the ministry around 2014; Mack stayed.

== Personal life and death ==
Mack's first wife was Roxanne Alexis Hill-Johnson, whom he married in 1995; they separated in 1999. They had two children, a son and a daughter. Mack later said he had remarried. Among his close friends was rapper and beatboxer Biz Markie.

Mack died at his home on March 12, 2018. The cause of death was originally reported as congestive heart failure, which Mack had claimed as a health problem in 2014. According to rapper Erick Sermon, Mack called his friends around six months before death to bid farewell as his health was declining. After his death, tributes were posted to social media by musicians LL Cool J, DJ Scratch, and others.

It was later revealed Mack died of HIV/AIDS. He had refused treatment; his brother and his first wife believe he learned of the diagnosis while still living in New York. Mack's family had followed his wishes in reporting the heart failure account rather than reporting the HIV/AIDS diagnosis.

== Discography ==
=== Studio albums ===
Title	Details	Peak chart positions		Certifications (sales threshold)
Title	Details	US	US R&B	Certifications (sales threshold)
Project: Funk da World	Release date: September 20, 1994; Label: Bad Boy Records; Formats: CD, cassette	21	6	RIAA: Gold
Operation: Get Down	Release date: June 24, 1997; Label: Street Life Records/Scotti Brothers; Formats: CD, cassette	46	17	
The Mack World Sessions	Release date: September 1, 2017; Label: Mack World; Formats: Digital download	—	—	

=== Singles ===
Years	Single	Peak chart positions				Certifications (sales threshold)	Album
Years	Single	US	US R&B	US Rap	UK	Certifications (sales threshold)	Album
1994	"Flava in Ya Ear"	9	4	1	57	RIAA: Platinum	Project: Funk Da World
1994	"Get Down"	38	17	2	54	RIAA: Gold	Project: Funk Da World
1995	"Making Moves with Puff"	—	—	—	—		Project: Funk Da World
1997	"What I Need"	103	55	16	—		Operation: Get Down
1998	"Jockin My Style"	—	—	—	—		Operation: Get Down
2001	"Wooden Horse" (featuring Frank Sinatra)	—	—	—	—		What's the Worst That Could Happen? & The Mack World Sessions
"—" denotes releases that did not chart

=== Music videos ===
Year	Video	Director
1993	You Don't Have to Worry (Remix) (Mary J. Blige featuring Craig Mack)	F. Gary Gray
1994	"Flava in Ya Ear"	Craig Henry
1994	"Flava in Ya Ear (Remix)	Hype Williams
1994	Get Down	Unknown
1995	Makin' Moves with Puff	Unknown
1995	If You Love Me (Remix) (Brownstone featuring Craig Mack)	Unknown
1995	Tonight's the Night (Remix) (Blackstreet featuring Craig Mack & SWV)	Hype Williams
1995	Vibin' (Remix) (Boyz II Men featuring Craig Mack, Method Man, Busta Rhymes & Treach)	Hype Williams
1997	Spirit (Sounds of Blackness featuring Craig Mack)	Unknown
1997	No One but You (Veronica featuring Craig)	Unknown

=== Guest appearances ===
Year	Title	Artist	Album
1993	You Don't Have to Worry (Remix)	Mary J. Blige	What's the 411? Remix
1994	Do You Have What It Takes?	—N/a	Street Fighter OST
1995	If You Love Me (Street Vibe Remix)	Brownstone	Non-album single
1995	"Tonight's the Night (Brand New Remix)	Blackstreet, SWV	Non-album single
1995	It's Alright	Sista	Dangerous Minds OST
1995	Vibin' (New Flava Remix)	Boyz II Men, Treach, Method Man, Busta Rhymes	Non-album single
1996	The Things That You Do (Darkchild Remix)	Gina Thompson, Mr. Mike Nitty, Craig Mack, Raekwon	Non-album single
1997	No One but You	Veronica	Rise
1997	Spirit	Sounds of Blackness	Time for Healing
1997	Treat Me Right	DJ Skribble	Traffic Jams
1998	Won't Stop	Miss Jones	The Other Woman
1999	Let Me Get Down	The Notorious B.I.G., G Dep, Missy Elliott	Born Again
2002	Special Delivery (Remix)	G Dep, Ghostface Killah, Keith Murray,	We Invented the Remix
2002	And We	P. Diddy, Foxy Brown, Black Rob, Kain, The Mighty Ha, G Dep, Big Azz Ko	Barbershop OST
2003	Everybody Wanna Shine	DJ Kay Slay, Black Rob, G Dep	The Streetsweep Vol. 1
