= Tayster and Rojac Records =

- Founded: 1957
- Country of origin: United States

Tay-ster and Rojac Records was a record label originally founded by purported gangster Fat Jack Taylor as Rojac Records in 1957 as a soul and R&B label, releasing, among other artists, a number of records by Big Maybelle. Rojac Records ceased operations in 1972 but was briefly revived as Tay-ster and Rojac Records, operating out of offices located above the Harlem World Disco nightclub from 1979 until 1984. During this latter phase the label released Disco and early Hip Hop records, among them Lovebug Starski's first single produced by David MacDonald nicknamed "Mighty Whitey". Other artists on the label included Harlem World Crew and MC Lady Smiley.

== See also ==
- List of record labels
