= Love No Limit =

Single by Mary J. Blige

from the album What's the 411?
- Released: May 10, 1993
- Recorded: 1992
- Genre: R&B; new jack swing
- Length: 5:02
- Label: Uptown; MCA
- Songwriter(s): Kenneth Greene; Dave Hall
- Producer(s): Dave "Jam" Hall

Mary J. Blige singles chronology
"Sweet Thing" (1993)	"Love No Limit" (1993)	"You Don't Have to Worry" (1993)

Music video
- "Love No Limit" on YouTube

"Love No Limit" is a song by American recording artist Mary J. Blige. It was co-written by Kenny Greene and Dave "Jam" Hall for her debut album, What's the 411? (1992), while production was overseen by Hall. Released in May 1993, by Uptown and MCA as the album's fourth and final single, the song became a top-5 hit, reaching number five on the US Billboard R&B singles chart. It also peaked at numbers 44 and 43 on the Billboard Hot 100 and Cash Box Top 100. Hall has stated in interviews, that he wanted to give the song an urban, hip-hop feel to a much more jazzy sound, when it was created.

R&B singer Monica sang the song as a tribute at the Essence Awards 2003. Blige later performed the song at the 3rd BET Honors in 2010, as part of a medley of her hits, when she paid tribute to honoree Diddy. The song was also briefly played in the 1993 American comedy film CB4, starring Chris Rock.

"Love No Limit was the last record we wrote for the album. I had a deadline to meet and Diddy was pressuring me to get it done,” he laughs. “He kept calling my house and I told him I had this song called; ‘Love No Limit’ that I wrote with Kenny Greene. He said, ‘Cool. Let me hear it.’ So I played it for him and he said, ‘I like it.’ But I don’t think he was 100% sold on it. We moved forward with it even though it was much different from the rest of the material on the album. It was really jazzy. I was big into old school jazz like Sarah Vaughan and Ella Fitzgerald. Kenny Greene was church trained so we did the song with a jazzy feel, but it still had a strong beat to it. He wrote a catchy hook to it and Mary loved it. She definitely loved that type of jazz music. This whole album defined her sound per se. We cut the record and I thought it turned out great, but we were still skeptical on how it would be received because it was so different than any of the other stuff on her album. I was amazed when it came out because there would be guys on the corner in the hood blasting the song".

—Dave "Jam" Hall talking to Ebony Magazine about how the song was made.

== Critical reception ==
In a retrospective review, Daryl McIntosh from Albumism stated that the "emotional love ballad" "Love No Limit", "reinforced Blige's versatility and ability to deliver in the more traditional R&B format." J.D. Considine from The Baltimore Sun remarked the "gentle, jazzy cadences" of the song. Larry Flick from Billboard magazine wrote, "Once again, her sultry, delightfully seasoned voice melts into a jazzy hip-hop groove. Romantic, swaying gem could become an instant fave at several radio formats. Give in to it." Mark Kinchen for Music Week's RM Dance Update commented, "Imagine a smoke-filled jazz club with Blige singing in a deep seductive voice over a very smooth basic R&B track. You've got the picture." Jonathan Bernstein from Spin complimented its "irresistible bounce".

== Music video ==
The song's accompanying music video for "Love No Limit" was directed by American director Millicent Shelton. It marked the acting debut of British actor Adewale Akinnuoye-Agbaje, whose claim to fame when he starred as a main character on HBO series “OZ” (1994) as Simone Adebesi. He would later star on the television series Lost. In the black-and-white video Blige is singing in a club.

== Remix version ==
In the official remix version, which is found on her What's the 411? Remix album, the song opens with a snippet of the original version, then the remix begins with Blige singing it in alternative way: the main beat takes a sample of Keni Burke's "Risin' to the Top" and the 1982 The Gap Band hit "Outstanding" while refraining Anita Baker's 1988 song "Good Love".

== Legacy ==
In June 1994, "Love No Limit" won one of ASCAP's R&B Music Awards.

== Tracklisting ==
- US Cassette single
- US 7" single
1. "Love No Limit" (Radio Edit) – 4:10
2. "Love No Limit" (Instrumental) – 4:59
- US Cassette maxi-single
- US CD single
1. "Love No Limit" (Puffy Daddy Mix) – 3:57
2. "Love No Limit" (Bad Boy Mix) – 3:56
3. "Love No Limit" (Jazz) – 4:12
4. "Love No Limit" (Hip Hop) – 4:07
- US 12" single
1. "Love No Limit" (Puffy Daddy Mix) – 3:57
2. "Love No Limit" (Jazz) – 4:12
3. "Love No Limit" (Hip Hop) – 4:07

== Credits and personnel ==
Credits adapted from the What's the 411? liner notes.

- Sean "Puffy" Combs – executive producer
- Charlie Davis – executive producer
- Kenneth Greene – lyrics
- Dave "Jam" Hall – producer
- Kurt Woodley – executive producer

== Charts ==
=== Weekly charts ===
Chart (1993)	Peak position
Europe (European Dance Radio)	5
UK Dance (Music Week)	19
US Billboard Hot 100	44
US Dance Singles Sales (Billboard)	7
US Hot R&B/Hip-Hop Songs (Billboard)	5
US Rhythmic (Billboard)	15
US Cash Box Top 100	43

=== Year-end charts ===
Chart (1993)	Position
US Hot R&B/Hip-Hop Songs (Billboard)	24
US Cash Box Top 100	37
