= Kenny Greene =

American singer

- Also known as: G-Love
- Born: January 17, 1969; Detroit, Michigan, U.S.
- Died: October 1, 2001 (aged 32) New York City, U.S.
- Genres: R&B, soul
- Occupations: Singer-songwriter, record producer
- Instruments: Keyboards, sampler, synthesizers, piano
- Years active: 1988–2001

Kenny Greene (January 17, 1969 – October 1, 2001) was an American singer-songwriter who was also a member of the R&B group Intro.

== Early life ==
Greene (born January 17, 1969, in Detroit, Michigan) grew up in a family with strong ties to gospel music and began singing in church as a child. At age 18, he enlisted in the United States Army, where he continued to perform by singing and playing piano in military talent shows. While in the service, he met and befriended future collaborator Buddy Wike. Following an honorable discharge from the military, Greene relocated to New York City, where he partnered with Wike and Jeff Sanders to form the R&B group Intro.

== Career ==
As a member of the R&B group Intro, Greene wrote and produced many of the group's tracks and was lead vocalist. He also wrote many songs for other artists, such as Mary J. Blige's "Reminisce" and "Love No Limit." For his work with Blige, Greene won the Songwriter of the Year award from the American Society of Composers, Authors & Publishers'. Greene also worked with Will Smith, Cam'ron and 98 Degrees.

In 1998, the singer had appeared on Cam'ron's album Confessions of Fire and AZ's album Pieces of a Man. The last time he recorded was early in 2001 singing background vocals for Tyrese on the song "For Always" on the 2000 Watts album.

== Death ==
In a 2001 interview with Sister 2 Sister magazine, Greene revealed that he was bisexual and that he was suffering from AIDS. He died in New York City at the age of 32 due to complications of the disease.
