= Andre Harrell =

American rapper and music executive (1960–2020)

- Born: Andre O’Neal Harrell; September 26, 1960; The Bronx, New York City, U.S.
- Died: May 7, 2020 (aged 59); West Hollywood, California, U.S.
- Other name: Dr. Jeckyll
- Education: Lehman College
- Occupations: Rapper; songwriter; record producer; record executive; media proprietor
- Years active: 1980–2020
- Children: 1
- Musical career
- Genres: Hip hop
- Labels: Uptown; Motown
- Formerly of: Dr. Jeckyll & Mr. Hyde

Andre O'Neal Harrell (September 26, 1960 – May 7, 2020) was an American record executive, media proprietor, and rapper. He formed the short-lived East Coast hip hop duo Dr. Jeckyll & Mr. Hyde with Alonzo Brown in 1980; they signed with Profile Records in 1981. After disbanding in 1986, Harrell founded the record label Uptown Records, which saw commercial success in contemporary R&B, new jack swing, and hip hop music releases into the next decade. The label entered a distribution deal with MCA Records and signed artists including Jodeci, Heavy D & the Boyz, Mary J. Blige, Guy, Al B. Sure, the Notorious B.I.G., and Sean Combs. Harrell is credited with discovering Combs and giving him his start in the industry. Harrell was appointed CEO of Motown from 1995 to 1997.

After years of sustained medical issues, Harrell died of heart failure in May 2020.

== Early life ==
Harrell was born in New York City’s borough of the Bronx on September 26, 1960. His father, Bernie, worked at a produce market in the Bronx's Hunts Point section; his mother, Hattie, was a nurse's aide.

Harrell cultivated his entrepreneurial instincts throughout high school, raising money with candy drives and picking up jobs with a local messenger service. As a teenager, he and Alonzo Brown—a friend from high school—formed the rap duo Dr. Jeckyll & Mr. Hyde. Harrell was Jeckyll, Brown was Hyde. They first performed together as members of the Harlem World Crew and recorded on Tayster and Rojac Records in 1980, but broke off from the group to form Dr. Jeckyll and Mr. Hyde. In 1981, Brown joined Profile Records under the name Lonnie Love, recorded "Young Ladies", and, as Dr. Jeckyll and Mr. Hyde, recorded with Harrell the well-received song "Genius Rap", one of the first hip hop records to sample the Tom Tom Club's "Genius of Love." They also recorded "The Challenge" (1982), "Gettin' Money" (1983), and "Fast Life" b/w "AM/PM" (1984), produced by Kurtis Blow. In 1985, the duo released its only album, Champagne of Rap. It also released the singles "Yellow Panties" (1985) and "Transformation" b/w "Scratch on Galaxy"(1986). Dr. Jeckyll and Mr. Hyde deviated from established hip hop style code by performing in suits and ties.

Harrell graduated from Charles Evans Hughes High School in 1978. He attended Baruch College, then transferred to Lehman College in 1980. With the aim of being a newscaster, he majored in communications and business management. In 1983, he withdrew from Lehman and began working full-time selling airtime on WINS radio while performing on weekends.

== Career ==
In 1983, Harrell met Russell Simmons, a co-founder of Def Jam Recordings. He went to work for Def Jam and within two years became vice president and general manager. In 1986, when MCA Records offered Harrell his own record company, he entered into a joint venture, and formed his own label, Uptown Records. "Rather than replicating the street-wise persona of Def Jam Recordings, Uptown Records represented the 'good life' that many young Blacks desired. The Uptown Records image was of performers draped in stylish clothing and surrounded by luxury, homes, furnishings, and cars."

As president of Uptown, Harrell launched the careers of Heavy D & The Boyz, Guy, Al B. Sure!, Father MC and Jodeci. He is credited with having discovered and signed Sean "Puffy" Combs. In 1988, Mary J. Blige recorded an impromptu cover of Anita Baker's "Caught Up in the Rapture" at a recording booth in a local mall. Her mother's boyfriend at the time played the cassette for Jeff Redd, a recording artist and A&R runner for Uptown Records. Redd sent it to Harrell, who met with Blige. In 1989, she signed with the label and became its youngest and first female solo artist.

In 1988, Harrell was offered a label deal from MCA Music Entertainment Group. After he had multiple successful releases, in 1992, MCA offered Harrell a multimedia deal, which involved film and television productions. They developed the feature film Strictly Business and FOX's hit police drama series, New York Undercover, which aired from 1994 until 1998.

Harrell renamed Uptown Records Uptown Enterprises, and its records featured in productions by Universal Pictures and Universal Television. In 1994, Harrell had a son, Gianni Credle-Harrell, with Wendy Credle, a music attorney.

In 1995, Harrell was appointed CEO of Motown Records. He remained there until 1997. He also hosted Champagne & Bubbles on Sunday nights from 6 to 9pm on Emmis Urban AC WRKS (98.7 Kiss FM)/New York. Harrell was CEO of Harrell Records, which is distributed through Atlantic Records. He partnered with the Atlanta-based production company L7 Entertainment for the release of their artists Hamilton Park and Netta Brielle.

Harrell was the Vice Chairman of Revolt, Diddy's multi-platform music network. On October 17, 2014, he was instrumental in launching the Revolt Music Conference in Miami, Florida, at the Fontainebleau Hotel. The event was attended by such entertainment figures as Guy Oseary, Russell Simmons, and L.A. Reid.

== Death ==
Harrell died on May 7, 2020, at his home in West Hollywood, California. He was 59, and news of his death was first announced on Instagram by D-Nice. According to Wendy Credle, Harrell's ex-partner, he had suffered heart problems in the time leading up to his death. At his funeral, on May 23, notable attendees included Mary J. Blige, Mariah Carey, and L.A. Reid.

At Lehman College's Leadership Gala on September 14, 2023, Harrell was posthumously awarded the degree of Doctor of Music, honoris causa.
