= Uptown Records =

American R&B/hip-hop record label (founded 1986)

- Parent company: Universal Music Group
- Founded: 1986; 40 years ago
- Founder: Andre Harrell
- Status: Active
- Distributors: Republic (United States); Geffen/UMe (reissues)
- Genre: R&B, hip-hop
- Country of origin: U.S.
- Location: New York City

Uptown Records is an American record label, based in New York City, founded in 1986 by rapper Andre Harrell. From the late 1980s into the early 1990s, it was a leader in R&B and hip-hop.

== Beginnings and success (1986–1993) ==
In 1986, Andre Harrell, one half of short-lived rap duo Dr. Jeckyll and Mr. Hyde, founded Uptown Records. Its compilation album, Uptown Is Kickin' It (1986) included the label's signees Heavy D & The Boyz and was distributed by MCA Records. The acts who recorded on the album were collectively known as The Uptown Crew. The Heavy D & The Boyz' debut album, Living Large (1987) was certified gold by the Recording Industry Association of America and found moderate mainstream success. Another artist that put Uptown on the map was Al B. Sure!, whose debut album, In Effect Mode (1988), saw commercial success and distribution from Warner Records. 1988 also saw two further successful releases from the label: the Gyrlz' debut album, Love Me or Leave Me, distributed by Capitol Records, and the eponymous album of Guy, a group whose lead member, Teddy Riley would lead the sound "new jack swing". The Guy album reached No. 1 on the R&B chart. Guy's second album, The Future, was met with further success in 1990. Heavy D & the Boyz' second album, 1989's Big Tyme, preceded their third album, Peaceful Journey, honoring the group's member Trouble T Roy, who died as a result of an accidental fall while on tour.

By 1990, 20-year-old Sean "Puffy" Combs began an internship at Uptown. Combs worked with newly signed acts Jodeci, Father MC, and Mary J. Blige, who altogether placed a number of singles on the R&B chart. Marking a fusion of hip hop and R&B was Mary J. Blige's debut album What's the 411?, released in July 1992, whereby she was dubbed the Queen of Hip Hop Soul. Led by her single "You Remind Me", it was certified three times platinum, honoring three million copies sold.

In 1991, Harrell was executive producer of the comedy film Strictly Business, starring Tommy Davidson and Halle Berry, as well as its soundtrack. The following year, Harrell and MCA reached a multimedia deal that eventuated in development of FOX's hit television series New York Undercover—a police drama originally named Uptown Undercover—which aired from 1994 to 1998. The record label itself was renamed Uptown Enterprises. By 1993, it was the leading urban label.

In February 1993, the MTV Unplugged live, acoustic series featured Jodeci, Father MC, Mary J. Blige, Christopher Williams, and Heavy D, resulting in release of Uptown Unplugged as both album and home video. A resulting single, Jodeci's live cover of Stevie Wonder's "Lately" peaked at No. 1 on the R&B chart and No. 4 on the Billboard Hot 100. Later in 1993, Uptown released the soundtrack to the hip-hop film Who's the Man?. Uptown also released Jodeci's second album, Diary of a Mad Band.

== Decline and resurgence (1993–present) ==
In July 1993, amid issues with Harrell, Uptown fired Combs. Within two weeks, he launched his own label, Bad Boy, while taking with him the Notorious B.I.G. Uptown promptly suffered, yet Combs remained executive producer of Mary J. Blige's second album, My Life, released December 1994. The album has received triple platinum certification by the RIAA.

Increasingly dissatisfied, Blige and Jodeci both signed to West Coast Management, the firm of Suge Knight, CEO of Death Row, based in Los Angeles. Thus, they gained double the royalty rates, more creative control, and sizable back payments. Meanwhile, the final Heavy D & The Boyz album, Nuttin' But Love, was released in 1994, and soon certified platinum by the RIAA.

In 1995, Uptown's next R&B group, Soul for Real, released their debut album Candy Rain, as did Jodeci's third and final studio album for Uptown, The Show, the After Party, the Hotel. Later in 1995, Harrell left Uptown to become CEO of Motown Records, while Heavy D, executive vice president of Uptown, became Uptown's president and CEO. Prominent acts like Mary J. Blige and Jodeci signed directly to Uptown's distribution label, MCA.

By 1996, MCA along with Universal Studios, the filmmaking house, was bought by the owners of Seagram's, and became Universal Music Group. In 1997, Heavy D resigned as CEO of Uptown, absorbed into Universal Music during 1999. In December 2019, television network BET announced production of a miniseries on the history of Uptown Records.

By 1999, the label was thought to be defunct. However in 2022, Ciara announced that she had signed a deal with Uptown Records via Republic Records, which would see the label assist in distributing her eighth studio album. Other hip hop figures such as G Herbo and Coi Leray have also released albums under the Uptown/Republic banner during the 2020s.

== Notable artists ==
=== Current ===
- Ciara (distribution/partnership deal with Republic)
- Coi Leray (Uptown/Republic)
- G Herbo (Uptown/Republic)
- Flo (Island UK/Uptown/Republic)
- Yung Miami (Uptown/Republic)
- Kirk Franklin (TRIBL Music Group/Uptown/Republic)

=== Former ===
- Al B. Sure! (Uptown/Warner Bros.)
- Anthony Hamilton
- Christopher Williams
- Crystal Johnson
- Father MC
- Groove B. Chill (Uptown/A&M Records)
- Guy
- Heavy D & The Boyz
- Horace Brown
- Jeff Redd
- Jodeci
- Key West
- Little Shawn
- Mary J. Blige
- Nesto Velasquez
- McGruff
- Monifah
- The Notorious B.I.G. (deceased)
- Puff Daddy (A&R and intern)
- Soul for Real
- Lost Boyz
- The Gyrlz (Uptown/Capitol)
