= Jodeci discography =

- Studio albums: 4
- Compilation albums: 3
- Singles: 13
- Music videos: 13

The discography of Jodeci, an American R&B group, consists of four studio albums, three compilation albums, thirteen singles, and thirteen music videos. The group was signed by Uptown Records after submitting a demo tape during a trip to New York. In 1991, they released their debut album, Forever My Lady, which peaked at number eighteen on the Billboard 200, and topped the Top R&B/Hip-Hop Albums chart in the United States. On April 28, 1995, the album was certified triple-platinum by the Recording Industry Association of America (RIAA). The album produced five singles, three of which topped the US R&B/Hip-Hop Songs: "Forever My Lady", "Stay", and "Come and Talk to Me". The last of these was certified gold by the RIAA.

In 1993, the group released its second studio album, Diary of a Mad Band, which peaked at number six on the Billboard 200 and number one on the Top R&B/Hip-Hop Albums. The album received a double-platinum certification by the RIAA, and spawned three singles: "Cry for You", "Feenin'", and "What About Us". All peaked in the top 15 of the Hot R&B/Hip-Hop Songs; the first two charted in the top 20 on the UK Singles Chart.

The Show, the After Party, the Hotel (1995) was the group's third, as well as most successful, album. It peaked at number two on the Billboard 200, and number one on the Top R&B/Hip-Hop Albums, and was certified platinum by the RIAA. It was Jodeci's only album to chart outside of the United States, peaking at number four on the UK Albums Chart and appearing on the Australian ARIA Albums Chart and the Dutch Mega Album Top 100. The Show, the After Party, the Hotel produced three singles, including "Freek'n You", which charted within the top 15 on both the Billboard Hot 100 and R&B/Hip-Hop Songs, and was certified gold by the RIAA. The single also charted on the Australian and Dutch Singles Chart.

Before returning in 2015 with the studio album, The Past, The Present, The Future, three compilation albums featuring songs by Jodeci were released between 2005 and 2008: Back to the Future: The Very Best of Jodeci, which peaked at number six on the R&B/Hip-Hop Albums chart, 20th Century Masters – Millennium Collection: The Best of Jodeci, which charted number eighty-six on the R&B/Hip-Hop Albums chart, and Playlist Your Way.

== Albums ==
=== Studio albums ===
List of albums, with selected chart positions
| Title | Album details | Peak chart positions | | | | | | Sales | Certifications |
| Title | Album details | US | US R&B | AUS | CAN | NL | UK | Sales | Certifications |
|---|---|---|---|---|---|---|---|---|---|
| Forever My Lady | Released: May 28, 1991; Label: Uptown/MCA; Format: CD, CS | 18 | 1 | 163 | — | — | — | | RIAA: 3× Platinum |
| Diary of a Mad Band | Released: December 21, 1993; Label: Uptown/MCA; Format: CD, CS | 3 | 1 | 99 | 33 | — | 88 | | RIAA: 2× Platinum |
| The Show, the After Party, the Hotel | Released: July 18, 1995; Label: Uptown/MCA; Format: CD, CS, LP | 2 | 1 | 13 | 16 | 36 | 4 | US: 1,000,000 | RIAA: Platinum |
| The Past, The Present, The Future | Released: March 31, 2015; Label: Sphinx Music Entertainment/Epic; Format: CD, DD | 23 | 2 | — | — | — | — | | |
"—" denotes releases that did not chart.

=== Compilation albums ===
List of albums, with selected chart positions
| Title | Album details | Peak chart positions | |
| Title | Album details | US | US R&B |
|---|---|---|---|
| Back to the Future: The Very Best of Jodeci | Released: June 7, 2005; Label: Universal Records; Format: CD | 27 | 6 |
| 20th Century Masters – The Millennium Collection: The Best of Jodeci | Released: 2006; Label: Universal; Format: CD | — | 86 |
| Playlist Your Way | Released: August 6, 2008; Label: Universal; Format: CD | — | — |
"—" denotes releases that did not chart.

== Singles ==
List of singles, with selected chart positions
| Title | Year | Peak chart positions | | | | | Certifications | Album |
| Title | Year | US | US R&B | AUS | NL | UK | Certifications | Album |
|---|---|---|---|---|---|---|---|---|
| "Gotta Love" | 1991 | — | 79 | — | — | — | | Forever My Lady |
| "Forever My Lady" | 1991 | 25 | 1 | — | — | — | | Forever My Lady |
| "Stay" | 1991 | 41 | 1 | — | — | — | | Forever My Lady |
| "Come and Talk to Me" | 1992 | 11 | 1 | — | — | — | RIAA: Gold | Forever My Lady |
| "I'm Still Waiting" | 1992 | 85 | 10 | — | — | — | | Forever My Lady |
| "Lately" | 1993 | 4 | 1 | 161 | 50 | — | RIAA: Gold | Uptown MTV Unplugged |
| "Cry for You" | 1993 | 15 | 1 | 199 | — | 20 | RIAA: Gold | Diary of a Mad Band |
| "Feenin'" | 1994 | 25 | 2 | — | — | 18 | | Diary of a Mad Band |
| "What About Us" | 1994 | —^{[A]} | 14 | — | — | — | | Diary of a Mad Band |
| "Freek'n You" | 1995 | 14 | 3 | 23 | 42 | 17 | RIAA: Gold | The Show, the After Party, the Hotel |
| "Love U 4 Life" | 1995 | 31 | 8 | 119 | — | 23 | | The Show, the After Party, the Hotel |
| "Get On Up" | 1996 | 22 | 4 | 191 | — | 20 | | The Show, the After Party, the Hotel |
| "Nobody Wins" (featuring B.o.B.) | 2014 | — | — | — | — | — | | The Past, The Present, The Future |
| "Every Moment" | 2015 | — | — | — | — | — | | The Past, The Present, The Future |
"—" denotes releases that did not chart.

=== As featured artist ===
List of singles, with selected chart positions
| Title | Year | Peak chart positions | | Album |
| Title | Year | US | US R&B | Album |
|---|---|---|---|---|
| "Treat Them Like They Want to Be Treated" (Father MC featuring Jodeci) | 1990 | — | 14 | Father's Day |
| "Lisa Baby" (Father MC featuring Jodeci) | 1991 | — | 87 | Father's Day |
| "Everything's Gonna Be Alright" (Father MC featuring Jodeci) | 1992 | 37 | 24 | Close to You |
| "Holla Back" (Maddi Madd featuring Jodeci) | 2006 | – | – | Holla Back |
| "Knockin' Your Heels Off"^{[B]} (H-Town featuring Jodeci) | 2011 | — | 120 | Child Support |
"—" denotes releases that did not chart.

== Promotional singles ==
List of promotional singles, with selected chart positions
| Title | Year | Peak chart positions | | Album |
| Title | Year | US | US R&B | Album |
|---|---|---|---|---|
| "Let's Go Through the Motions" | 1993 | 65 | 31 | Who's the Man? (soundtrack) |
"—" denotes releases that did not chart.

== Other charted songs ==
List of non-singles, with selected chart positions
| Title | Year | Peak chart positions | Album |
| Title | Year | UK | Album |
|---|---|---|---|
| "Cherish" | 1993 | 56 | Fried Green Tomatoes (soundtrack) |

== Other appearances ==
| Title | Year | Album |
|---|---|---|
| "Come Up to My Room" | 1994 | Murder Was the Case |
| "Give It Up" | 1996 | Don't Be a Menace to South Central While Drinking Your Juice in the Hood (soundtrack) |
| "Wild Side" | 1996 | High School High (soundtrack) |

== Music videos ==
List of music videos, with director(s)
| Title | Year | Director(s) |
|---|---|---|
| "Gotta Love" | 1991 | Lionel C. Martin |
| "Forever My Lady" | 1991 | Michael Martin |
| "Stay" | 1991 | Unknown |
| "Come and Talk to Me" | 1992 | Lionel C. Martin |
| "I'm Still Waiting" | 1992 | Lionel C. Martin |
| "Let's Go Through the Motions" | 1993 | Sean "Puffy" Combs |
| "Lately" | 1993 | Unknown |
| "Cry for You" | 1993 | Sean "Puffy" Combs |
| "Feenin'" | 1994 | Hype Williams & DeVanté |
| "Freek'n You" | 1995 | Donald DeGrate |
| "Love U 4 Life" | 1995 | Brett Ratner |
| "Get on Up" | 1996 | Marcus Nispel |
| "Every Moment" | 2015 | Hype Williams |

== Notes ==
A. "What About Us" did not enter the Billboard Hot 100, but peaked at number 1 on Bubbling Under Hot 100 Singles, a chart which acts like a 25-song extension to the Hot 100.
B. "Knockin' Your Heels Off" did not enter R&B/Hip-Hop Songs, but peaked at number 19 on Bubbling Under R&B/Hip-Hop Singles, a chart which acts like a 25-song extension to R&B/Hip-Hop Songs.
