= Back to the Future: The Very Best of Jodeci =

Back to The Future: The Very Best of Jodeci

Greatest hits album by Jodeci
- Released: June 7, 2005
- Recorded: 1991–1995
- Genre: R&B
- Length: 79:46
- Label: Universal Records
- Producer: Mike Ragogna, Dalvin DeGrate

Jodeci chronology
The Show, the After Party, the Hotel (1995)	Back to The Future: The Very Best of Jodeci (2005)	Playlist Your Way (2008)

Professional ratings
Review scores
Source	Rating
AllMusic	4/5 stars

Back to The Future: The Very Best of Jodeci is a greatest hits LP for R&B group Jodeci, released by Universal Records in 2005. The original compilation was to include the song "That Thang", which featured rap artists Trick Daddy and Trina. The song was replaced with "Good Luv", due to Atlantic Records having ownership of "That Thang".

== Track listing ==
No.	Title	Credits	Length
1.	"Forever My Lady"	Donald DeGrate, Albert Brown	5:15
2.	"Stay"	Donald DeGrate	5:10
3.	"Come & Talk To Me"	Donald DeGrate	4:30
4.	"I'm Still Waiting"	Donald DeGrate	4:19
5.	"Lately"	Stevie Wonder, Donald DeGrate	5:49
6.	"Cry For You"	Donald DeGrate	5:00
7.	"Feenin'"	Donald DeGrate	5:10
8.	"My Heart Belongs To U"	Donald DeGrate	4:59
9.	"What About Us"	Donald DeGrate, Devell Moore	4:32
10.	"Love U 4 Life"	Donald DeGrate	4:54
11.	"Freek'n You"	Donald DeGrate	6:35
12.	"Alone (Remix)"	Donald DeGrate, (Rap written by Dalvin DeGrate)	4:41
13.	"Success (Remix)"	Dalvin DeGrate, Cedric Hailey, Donald DeGrate	4:36
14.	"Get On Up"	Dalvin DeGrate, Cedric Hailey, Joel Hailey	4:04
15.	"S-More (Remix)"	Dalvin DeGrate, Cedric Hailey, Donald DeGrate, Melissa Elliott	5:16
16.	"Good Luv"	Donald DeGrate	4:50
