= Lionel C. Martin videography =

The videography of Lionel C. Martin consists of over 100 music video credits, as well as three feature film credits.

== Films ==
Year	Film
1991	Big Daddy Kane: Chocolate City
1997	Def Jam's How to Be a Player
2001	Longshot

== Music videos ==
=== 1984-1989 ===
Year	Artist	Song
1984	Roxanne Shanté	"Roxanne's Revenge"
1987	Heavy D & the Boyz featuring Al B. Sure!	"Don't You Know"
1988	Biz Markie	"Vapors"
1988	Public Enemy	"Night of the Living Baseheads"
1989	Stop the Violence Movement	"Self Destruction"
1989	Arabian Prince	"She's Got a Big Posse"
1989	Biz Markie	"Just a Friend"
1989	Cool C	"The Glamorous Life"

=== 1990-1994 ===
Year	Artist	Song			
1990	3rd Bass	"The Gas Face"			
1990	Bell Biv DeVoe	"Poison" [Remix]			
1990	Bell Biv DeVoe	"Do Me!"			
1990	Father MC featuring Jodeci	"Treat Them Like They Want to Be Treated"			
1990	Another Bad Creation	"Iesha"			
1991	Bell Biv DeVoe	"When Will I See You Smile Again?"			
1991	Guy	"Let's Chill"			
1991	Jodeci	"Gotta Love"			
1991	Ralph Tresvant	"Stone Cold Gentleman"			
1991	Boyz II Men	"Motownphilly"			
1991	Ed O.G. & Da Bulldogs	"Bug-A-Boo"			
1991	Biz Markie	"What Comes Around Goes Around"			
1991	Whitney Houston	"My Name Is Not Susan"			
1991	Boyz II Men	"It's So Hard to Say Goodbye to Yesterday"			
1991	Tony! Toni! Toné!	"House Party II (I Don't Know What You Come to Do)"			
1991	Stevie Wonder	"Fun Day"			
1991	Bell Biv DeVoe	"She's Dope!"			
1991	Boyz II Men	"Uhh Ahh"			
1991	DJ Jazzy Jeff & The Fresh Prince	"The Things That U Do"			
1991	MC Brains	"Oochie Coochie"			
1992	Boyz II Men	"Sympin'"			
1992	Jodeci	"Come and Talk to Me"			
1992	Showbiz and A.G.	"Soul Clap"			
1992	R. Kelly and Public Announcement	"Honey Love"			
1992	Mr. Lee featuring R. Kelly	"Hey Love (Can I Have a Word)"			
1992	Hi-Five	"She's Playing Hard to Get"			
1992	Bobby Brown	"Humpin' Around"			
1992	Boyz II Men	"End of the Road"			
1992	Nice & Smooth	"Cake & Eat It Too"			
1992	Jodeci	"I'm Still Waiting"			
1992	Wreckx-N-Effect	"Rump Shaker"			
1992	Tevin Campbell	"Confused"			
1993	R. Kelly and Public Announcement	"Dedicated"			
1993	Bell Biv DeVoe	"Gangsta"			
1993	Joe Public	"This One's for You"			
1993	Silk	"Freak Me" (Version 2)			
1993	H-Town	"Knockin' Da Boots"			
1993	SWV	"Weak"			
1993	Biz Markie	"Let Me Turn You On"			
1993	SWV	"Downtown"			
1993	SWV	"Right Here/Human Nature"			
1993	Bell Biv DeVoe	"Something in Your Eyes"			
1993	Another Bad Creation	"I Don't Wanna Be Grown Up"			
1993	Another Bad Creation	"Where Your Little Sista"			
1993	Maze	"Laid Back Girl"			
1993	U.N.V.	"Straight from My Heart"			
1993	Toni Braxton	"Seven Whole Days"			
1993	Boyz II Men	"Let It Snow"			
1993	Boyz II Men	"Silent Night"			
1993	TLC	"Sleigh Ride"	1994	Gang Starr	"Code of the Streets"
Jeru the Damaja	"D. Original"		1994		
Prince Markie Dee	"Something Special"		1994		
7669	"Joy"		1994		
Joe	"All or Nothing"		1994		
Toni Braxton	"You Mean the World to Me"		1994		
Toni Braxton	"How Many Ways"		1994		
Patti LaBelle	"The Right Kinda Lover"		1994		
Usher	"Can U Get wit It"		1994		
Shanice	"Turn Down the Lights"		1994		
Big Daddy Kane	"In the P.J.'s"		1994		
Gerald Levert	"I'd Give Anything"		1994		
Boyz II Men	"I'll Make Love to You"		1994		
Shanice	"I Like"		1994		
Jewell	"Woman to Woman"		1994		
Shaquille O'Neal	"Biological Didn't Bother"		1994		
N II U	"I Miss You"		1994		
Boyz II Men	"On Bended Knee"		1994		

=== 1995-1999 ===
Year	Artist	Song
1995	Barrio Boyzz	"How We Roll"
1995	Barrio Boyzz	"I Wish"
1995	Full Force	"Back Together Again"
1995	Karyn White	"I'd Rather Be Alone"
1995	Shaquille O'Neal featuring Method Man and RZA	"No Hook"
1995	Boyz II Men	"Thank You"
1995	Boyz II Men	"Vibin'"
1995	2Pac	"Dear Mama"
1995	Smooth	"Mind Blowin'"
1995	Brian McKnight	"Crazy Love"
1995	Intro	"Feels Like the First Time"
1995	Backstreet Boys	"We've Got It Goin' On"
1995	Eazy-E	"Just tah Let U Know"
1995	Backstreet Boys	"I'll Never Break Your Heart"
1996	Xscape	"Do You Want To"
1996	Xscape	"Can't Hang"
1996	Intrigue	"Dance With Me"
1996	SWV	You're the One
1996	Jesse Powell	"Gloria"
1996	The Temptations	"Time After Time"
1996	Art n' Soul	"All My Luv"
1996	The Rude Boys	"Lock Down"
1996	Zakiya	"Love Like Mine"
1996	Men of Vizion	"Do Thangz"
1996	Luke	"Scarred"
1996	Makaveli featuring Danny Boy, K-Ci & JoJo and Aaron Hall	"Toss It Up"
1997	Will Downing	"If She Knew"
1997	Backstreet Boys	"Anywhere for You"
1997	LeVert	"Tru Dat"
1997	Nice & Smooth	"Blazing Hot"
1997	Uncle Sam	"You Make Me Feel Like"
1997	2Pac	"I Wonder If Heaven Got a Ghetto"
1997	Aaron Carter	"Crush on You"
1998	2 Live Crew featuring KC and Freak Nasty	"2 Live Party"
1998	The Moffatts	"I'll Be There for You"
1998	4 the Cause	"Stand By Me"
1998	Miss Jones	"2 Way Street"
1998	By Chance	"Baby It's On"
1998	Uncle Sam	"When I See You Smile"
1998	NSYNC	"U Drive Me Crazy"
1998	NSYNC	"(God Must Have Spent) A Little More Time on You"
1998	NSYNC	"Merry Christmas, Happy Holidays"
1998	The Temptations	"Stay"

=== 2000-2004 ===
Year	Artist	Song
2002	Michael Bolton	"Dance with Me"

=== 2005-2009 ===
Year	Artist	Song
2005	Lina	"Smooth"
2005	Mint Condition	"Whoaa"
2005	Jill Scott	"Cross My Mind"

=== 2009-2017 ===
Year	Artist	Song
2017	Bell Biv DeVoe	"Run"
