= The Past, the Present, the Future (Jodeci album) =

Studio album by Jodeci
- Released: March 31, 2015
- Studios: Audio Mix House, Henderson, Nevada
- Genres: Hip hop; R&B; new jack swing
- Length: 51:44
- Labels: Sphinx; Epic
- Producers: DeVante Swing (exec.); Breyon Prescott (exec.); Louis Burrell (exec.); Lajuanna Burrell (exec.); Marquinarius "Sanchez" Holmes; Bradd Young; Steve Beckham; Timbaland

Jodeci chronology
| Playlist Your Way (2008) | The Past, the Present, the Future (2015) |

Singles from The Past, the Present, the Future
- 1. "Nobody Wins" Released: December 22, 2014; 2. "Every Moment" Released: January 28, 2015

Professional ratings
Aggregate scores
| Source | Rating |
|---|---|
| Metacritic | 69/100 |
Review scores
| Source | Rating |
| AllMusic | 3.5/5 stars |
| Clash | 3/10 |
| Exclaim! | 5/10 |
| Pitchfork | 7/10 |

The Past, the Present, the Future is the fourth studio album by American R&B group Jodeci. It was released on March 31, 2015, through Sphinx Music Entertainment and distributed through Epic Records. It is the group's first studio album in 20 years.

== Background ==
On October 20, 2014, it was announced by Centric and BET that Jodeci would be making their way back onto the music scene after a hiatus of nearly two decades at the 2014 Soul Train Awards by performing a medley of their hits, and also debuting a new song titled "Nobody Wins", their first single in 18 years, which features rapper B.o.B. Group member Mr. Dalvin explained the long-awaited release of their new music to Yahoo Music.

"'Sometimes it’s just the wrong timing,' said Mr. Dalvin explaining why the group has not released any new music since 1996's "Get On Up".

"You can fall into the trap that a lot of artists fall into by just putting records out there because fans are excited and start tarnishing your legacy and body of work you’ve created. People waited all these years for some quality music – not just throwing music out there."

On November 30, 2014, at the Soul Train Awards, Jodeci reunited and performed a medley of their hits ("Freek'n You", "Stay", "Come and Talk to Me", and "Forever My Lady"), along with a snippet of their new single, “Nobody Wins”, with B.o.B.

== Recording and production ==
In an interview with Rolling Stone, Mr. Dalvin stated that despite recording dozens of songs together over the last 18 years, the group did not feel that they had a cohesive body of work for their fourth studio album. "We've recorded hundreds of songs, even if it's bits and pieces and fragments of songs that we could probably live off of for the rest of our lives. But when creating this album, we chose a body of work that really represents us as a group and represents what people are expecting to hear from Jodeci as a group. People will be pleasantly surprised. Fans can expect to hear their artistic growth. Some fans want 'Come and Talk to Me' Part 2, and that's not what it is, and we don't get pigeonholed by the radio and let our fans grow with us. As with their earlier work, most of the music would be self-produced. However, Dalvin confirmed that Timbaland, who was discovered by DeVante Swing, will collaborate. "Timbaland, who started with us, I know he's going to be somehow involved in the project," he revealed.

In a fan chat on February 3, 2014 Timbaland revealed that he's reuniting with DeVante and lending his production to the new Jodeci project.

“People who follow Timbaland from day one, I met with DeVante and I’ma help work on the new Jodeci album, just for y’all. That’ll be my career coming in full circle, connecting back with DeVante.

However, Dalvin made it clear not to expect to hear the sound that Timbaland has created for Justin Timberlake and others recently.

"It couldn’t be a Timbaland type of project. A lot of people don’t know, my brother Devante really showed Timbaland how to produce records. We had our sound mixed with his sound. It would never be in one direction. It’s going to be a mix of Devante and Timbaland."

"We finally came together and we had a nice body of work that we felt was a great album." "With K-Ci & JoJo touring as well as Devante and myself doing production and other business ventures going on, we finally came together and we put together an album that we love."

"The album was already in the works, but we were aware everyone was asking us for a date and time. We didn't want to keep saying 'It’s coming!' so we figured if we backed up off it, everyone would back up off us. The ball was always rolling though. We just didn't have a time frame though. People were like 'You said this date, you said that date!' We didn't have a date and we wanted to make sure the time was right. Now is the right time, so we're on the fast lane moving towards the release of the single and album."

In a pre-Grammy interview in February 2015, DeVante was asked about Timbaland's involvement in the project. "Maybe, we'll see. I don't know as of this point right now, but he's there. That's a friend, that's family you know."

In an interview with group member JoJo, he stated that before the group became known as Jodeci, the original song Jennifer, written by DeVante, was responsible for forming Jodeci as a group, bringing in K-Ci for the song. DeVante stated in a Vibe interview, "I wrote a song about a girl I liked; the chorus was, 'Where could I go wrong…' JoJo sang the song. People were saying we should do something with it."

On February 24, 2015, Jodeci revealed the artwork and track list for the album, titled The Past, the Present, the Future and executively produced by Louis Burrell, Lajuanna Burrell, Breyon Prescott and DeVante Swing with Timbaland co-producing two songs: "Incredible" and "Those Things". Also featuring Mila J, Liana Banks and rappers B.o.B & AV. A promotional track for the album, "Checkin for You" was released as part of the album's pre-order package.

For this album, it marks the first time that DeVanté Swing would be featured in the writing credits using the moniker "X1500."

== Singles ==
On December 21, 2014, Jodeci released the full-length version of the new song, "Nobody Wins", along with a lyric video that features domestic violence hotline information.

"Domestic violence has always been an issue in relationships, but because of the caliber of people being charged recently, it's being brought to the forefront," Dalvin said about the song's content in an interview with Rolling Stone. "It's definitely something people are going to listen to because domestic violence should not be tolerated in any situation, not just between men and women, but people in general."

After the release of "Nobody Wins", Jodeci returned with their official lead single "Every Moment" on January 28, 2015 followed by the announcement of signing an exclusive deal with Epic Records and an album release under Louis Burrell's label, Sphinx Music Entertainment, with Burrell being the executive producer for the album and also the brother and former manager of rapper MC Hammer.

The music video for "Every Moment" debuted on February 25, 2015. It was directed by Hype Williams in Aspen, Colorado. Williams previously directed the group's video for "Feenin'".

== Commercial performance ==
The album debuted at number 23 on the US Billboard 200 and at No. 2 on R&B Albums chart, selling 28,041 units the first week.

== Critical reception ==
The Past, the Present, the Future received generally favorable reviews from music critics. At Metacritic, which assigns a normalized rating out of 100 to reviews from mainstream critics, the album received an average score of 69, based on seven reviews.

Anupa Mistry from Pitchfork wrote that Jodeci, led by producer/singer DeVante Swing, remains a group of soul classicists, thematically inspired by the intimacy and lewdness of sex and buttressed by the aesthetic and energy of hip-hop."

Jon Caramanica of The New York Times described the best Jodeci songs as "slick marches that focus on the body, like this album’s “Checkin for You” and “Stress Reliever.” Atop it all is K-Ci. He may have roots in the church, but the Lord's favor isn't what his music typically craves. When K-Ci is seducing, he's pleading and moist. And he gets better as he devolves, his finest moments less about lyrics than postverbal utterances. One exception here is “Jennifer,” an anguished ballad that shows off some of K-Ci and JoJo's peak harmonizing."

Jim Farber of New York Daily News gave it four out of five stars, writing "The Past, The Present, The Future” reconstitutes a particular blend of voices that helped define early 1990s R&B." The new Jodeci songs aren’t just about recalling the past. There’s a sense of the present in the production of Timbaland and group member DeVante Swing. It gives the voices a richer, deeper setting than they had way back when. One song — “Jennifer,” written by Swing — breaks with this essential style with a pure pop melody the group has rarely allowed."

Andy Kellman from AllMusic described the album as "a confident, refined return -- a necessary one in a field starving for group harmony singing. It's as solid as a reasonable longtime fan could expect." With the past and present indeed woven together throughout.

== Track listing ==
| No. | Title | Writer(s) | Producer(s) | Length |
|---|---|---|---|---|
| 1. | "Too Hot" (featuring AV) | DeVante Swing, Steve Beckham, Dalvin DeGrate, N. McCuien | DeVante Swing, Bradd Young, Marquinarius "Sanchez" Holmes | 3:59 |
| 2. | "Sho Out" | Swing, Beckham | DeVante Swing, S. Beckham | 4:18 |
| 3. | "Checkin for You" | Swing, Beckham | DeVante Swing, Bradd Young, Marquinarius "Sanchez" Holmes | 3:26 |
| 4. | "Those Things" | Swing, Beckham | DeVante Swing, Timbaland | 5:24 |
| 5. | "Every Moment" | Swing, Beckham, DeGrate | DeVante Swing, Bradd Young, Marquinarius "Sanchez" Holmes | 4:06 |
| 6. | "Nobody Wins" (featuring B.o.B.) | Swing, B.o.B., Beckham | DeVante Swing, Marquinarius "Sanchez" Holmes | 5:02 |
| 7. | "Incredible" | Swing, Beckham, DeGrate | DeVante Swing, Timbaland | 5:00 |
| 8. | "Jennifer" | Swing, Beckham | DeVante Swing, Bradd Young | 4:51 |
| 9. | "Body Parts" (featuring Mila J) | Swing, Beckham, Liana Banks | DeVante Swing, Bradd Young, Marquinarius "Sanchez" Holmes | 3:43 |
| 10. | "Stress Reliever" | Swing, Beckham | DeVante Swing, Bradd Young, Marquinarius "Sanchez" Holmes | 4:28 |
| 11. | "Sho Out" (featuring Liana Banks) | Swing, Beckham, Liana Banks | DeVante Swing, S. Beckham | 3:49 |
| 12. | "Nobody Wins" | Swing, Beckham | DeVante Swing, Marquinarius "Sanchez" Holmes | 3:21 |

== Personnel ==
Credits adapted from liner notes

- Jaycen Joshua - mixing
- Ryan Kaul - assistant mixing
- Maddox Chhim - assistant mixing
- Dave Kutch - mastering
- Anita Marisa Boriboon - art direction & design
- Steven Taylor - photography
- Chris "Tek" O'Ryan - sound engineer

Sample credits

- "Too Hot" contains a sample of "You Don't Love Me" as performed by Dawn Penn.
- "Incredible" contains an interpolation of "Tell Me If You Still Care" as performed by the S.O.S. Band.
- ”Those Things” contains a sample of Jodeci's "Come and Talk to Me" which was released as a single from their 1991 debut album Forever My Lady.

== Charts ==
=== Weekly charts ===
| Chart (2015) | Peak position |
|---|---|
| US Billboard 200 | 23 |
| US Top R&B/Hip-Hop Albums (Billboard) | 6 |

=== Year-end charts ===
| Chart (2015) | Position |
|---|---|
| US Top R&B/Hip-Hop Albums (Billboard) | 66 |
