= 4 All the Sistas Around da World =

1994 studio album by Sista

Studio album by Sista
- Released: September 20, 1994
- Recorded: 1993–1994
- Genres: R&B; hip hop; hip hop soul; new jack swing
- Length: 50:39
- Labels: Swing Mob; Elektra
- Producers: Dalvin DeGrate, DeVante Swing, Timbaland

Singles from 4 All the Sistas Around da World
- 1. "Brand New" Released: October 17, 1994

4 All the Sistas Around da World is the only studio album by American contemporary R&B group Sista, released September 20, 1994, on Elektra Records. One of the group's members was future rap star and producer Missy Elliott; her future collaborator Timbaland co-produced the album.

Although the album received positive reviews from music critics, the work was eventually shelved due to the first single not having much success on the charts. However, in May 2017, 4 All the Sistas Around da World was officially released on digital and streaming platforms by Rhino Entertainment.

== Release and reception ==
Professional ratings
Review scores
Source	Rating
AllMusic	4.5/5 stars

Paul Clifford of AllMusic called the effort a "superb and extremely underrated album," noting the song "Feel of Your Lips" as the highlight.

== Track listing ==
All music by DeVante Swing and Timbaland except where noted.

No.	Title	Music	Length
1.	"Intro Talk"		0:58
2.	"Hip Hop"		3:28
3.	"Slow Down"		1:00
4.	"Wfro"		0:18
5.	"Sweat You Down"		3:35
6.	"DeVante at the Payphone"		0:16
7.	"Find My Love"		3:00
8.	"I Wanna Know"		1:57
9.	"Hit U Up"	Dalvin DeGrate	4:04
10.	"125th Street"		1:45
11.	"Big Shann and Timbaland at Train Stop"		0:45
12.	"I Don't Mind"		3:33
13.	"Secret Admirer"		3:56
14.	"Sista Bounce"		1:44
15.	"Swing Thing"		2:21
16.	"Brand New"		4:25
17.	"I Wanna Be with U"		3:23
18.	"Good Thang" (featuring Missy Elliott and LaShawn Shellman)		4:16
19.	"Feel of Your Lips" (featuring Mary J. Blige, Virginia Williams and K-Ci)		5:05
20.	"Sista Mack"		0:50

== Samples ==
- "Good Thang" samples "Who Can I Run To" By The Jones Girls.

== Chart history ==
=== Singles ===
Year	Single	Peak chart positions
Year	Single	U.S. Hot R&B/Hip-Hop Singles & Tracks
1994	"Brand New"	84

== Outtakes ==
- "You Betta Be Ready" (produced By Timbaland)
- "Sweat You Down (Remix) feat. Craig Mack"
- "Find My Love (Remix)"
- "Brand New (Remix) feat. Static Major & Dalvin DeGrate"
- "Brand New (Rap Verses Remix) feat. Static Major & Dalvin DeGrate"

== Personnel ==
Information taken from AllMusic.

- album coordination – Crystal M. Johnson
- art direction – Alli
- bass – Darryl Pearson
- creative direction – Dalvin Degrate, DeVante Swing
- design – Brett!
- executive production – DeVante Swing
- guitar – Darryl Pearson
- label coordination – Steve Lucas
- multi-instruments – DeVante Swing, Timbaland
- performer – Missy Elliott, La'Shawn Shellman
- photography – Cartel, Daniel Hastings
- production – Dalvin DeGrate, DeVante Swing, Timbaland
- rapping – Missy Elliott
- vocals – Mary J. Blige, DeVante Swing, Cedric "K-Ci" Hailey
- vocals (background) – Mary J. Blige, Cedric "K-Ci" Hailey, Virginia Williams,
