= Back to the Future (disambiguation) =

Back to the Future is a 1985 science fiction film and was the first film in the popular American science-fiction film franchise.

Back to the Future may also refer to:

== Film and television ==
- Back to the Future (franchise)
  - Back to the Future (TV series), a 1991 French-American TV series
- Ivan Vasilievich: Back to the Future, a 1973 Soviet film, unrelated to the Back to the Future franchise
- "Back to the Future (Not the Movie)", the 2006 series finale to the American science fiction sitcom Phil of the Future, unrelated to the Back to the Future franchise

== Music ==
=== Albums ===
- Back to the Future soundtracks, a list of soundtrack albums from the franchise
- Back to the Future Now: Live at Arizona Charlie's, Las Vegas, a 1997 country album by Asleep at the Wheel
- Back to the Future: The Very Best of Jodeci, a 2005 compilation album by Jodeci
- Back to the Future, a 1999 album by Willie Rosario
- Back to the Future, a 2005 jazz album by various artists including Andrea Centazzo and Anthony Coleman
- Back to the Future, a 2008 album by Phoenix & Mony Bordeianu
- Back to the Future, a 2013 album by Big Daddy Kane

=== Songs ===
- "Back to the Future", a song by Diana Ross compiled on 1993 Forever Diana: Musical Memoirs
- "Back to the Future", a song on Dru Hill's 2010 album InDRUpendence Day
- "Back to the Future", a song on Bastille's 2022 album Give Me the Future

== Video games ==
- Back to the Future (1985 video game), a 1985 video game based on the film of the same name
- Back to the Future (1989 video game), a 1989 video game based on the film of the same name
- Back to the Future: The Game, a 2010 video game based on the Back to the Future franchise, and direct sequel to Back to the Future Part III

== Other ==
- Back to the Future: The Pinball, a 1990 pinball machine
- Back to the Future: The Ride, the 1991 theme park simulator ride sequel to Back to the Future Part III
- Back to the Future: The Musical, the 2020 musical adaptation of the 1985 film

== See also ==
- "Back to Dave's Future", a 1987 episode of Alvin and the Chipmunks (1983)
- "Back to Our Future", a 1990 episode of Alvin and the Chipmunks (1983)
- "Bach to the Future", a 1995 episode of Oscar's Orchestra
- "Bart to the Future", a 2000 episode of The Simpsons
