= Get On Up (Jodeci song) =

1996 single by Jodeci

"Get on Up"

Single by Jodeci

from the album The Show, the After Party, the Hotel
- Released: January 11, 1996
- Recorded: 1995
- Genre: R&B, soul
- Length: 3:47
- Label: Uptown/MCA
- Songwriters: Dalvin DeGrate, Cedric Hailey, Joel Hailey, Ivan Lins, Vítor Martins
- Producer: Mr. Dalvin

Jodeci singles chronology
"Love U 4 Life" (1995)	"Get on Up" (1996)	"Nobody Wins" (2014)

"Get on Up" is a song by American R&B group Jodeci, recorded for their third album, The Show, the After Party, the Hotel (1995). The song was released by Uptown/MCA as the third and final single for the album in January 1996. "Get on Up" contains the sample of the 1981 song from Quincy Jones featuring Toots Thielemans' "Velas". Produced by Mr. Dalvin and written by Mr. Dalvin and K-Ci & JoJo, it is the only Jodeci single to date that was not produced or written by group leader DeVante Swing. It was also the last Jodeci single released in 18 years before the group returned in 2014 with the single "Nobody Wins". "Get on Up" peaked at numbers 14 and 22 on the US Cash Box Top 100 and Billboard Hot 100 charts. The group performed the song when they guest starred in a season one episode of the UPN sitcom Moesha.

== Critical reception ==
Larry Flick from Billboard magazine wrote, "The time, the lads kick it lovely on a lively pop/funk throwdown that harks back to the Spinners and the Gap Band with its breezy harmonies and jovial hand claps. It's a perfect addition to the spring season's party soundtrack, so expect instant R&B radio action, followed by equally ardent play on top 40 stations."

== Track listings ==
- CD, promo
1. "Get on Up" (Radio Edit) - 3:40
2. "Get on Up" (Dalvin Remix) - 4:17
3. "Get on Up" (The Instant Flava Mix) - 4:26
4. "Get on Up" (LP Instrumental) - 4:21
- Vinyl, 12"
1. "Get on Up" (LP Version) - 3:43
2. "Get on Up" (Mr. Dalvin's Remix) - 4:17
3. "Freek'n You" - 5:07
  (feat. Ghostface Killah and Raekwon)

== Personnel ==
Information taken from the album’s Liner Notes and Discogs.

- K-Ci Hailey - Lead and Background vocals
- Jojo Hailey - Lead and Background vocals
- Mr. Dalvin - Musical arrangement, Background vocals
- DeVante Swing - Background vocals
- Additional Instruments: Darryl Pearson
- Executive Producers: DeVante Swing, Andre Harrell
- Remixing: Instant Flava, Mr. Dalvin
- Scratches: DJ Double D (The Instant Flava Mix only)

== Charts ==
=== Weekly charts ===
Chart (1996)	Peak position
Australia (ARIA)	191
US Billboard Hot 100	22
US Dance Club Songs (Billboard)	10
US Hot R&B/Hip-Hop Songs (Billboard)	4
US Rhythmic Airplay (Billboard)	15
US Cash Box Top 100	14

=== Year-end charts ===
Chart (1996)	Position
US Hot R&B/Hip-Hop Songs (Billboard)	23

== Certifications ==
Region	Certification	Certified units/sales
New Zealand (RMNZ)	Gold	15,000^{‡}
^{‡} Sales+streaming figures based on certification alone.
