= Black to the Future =

Black to the Future may refer to:

- Black to the Future (Hugh Masekela album), a 1998 jazz album by Hugh Masekela
- Black to the Future (Sons of Kemet album), a 2021 jazz album by Sons of Kemet
- Black to the Future (TV series) is a 2009 television mini-series that originally aired on VH1
- Timewasters, a 2017 UK time-travel comedy TV programme developed under the title Black to the Future

== See also ==
- Black from the Future, a 2016 hip-hop album by Grand Puba
- Back to the Future (disambiguation)
