= Sex Is Law =

Studio album by Father MC
- Released: June 15, 1993
- Recorded: 1992–1993
- Genre: Hip-hop
- Length: 46:24
- Label: Uptown
- Producer: DJ Clark Kent; DJ Eddie F; Kev 'Boogie' Smith; Mark Spark; Pete Rock; Ski Beatz; Teddy Riley; Ty Fyffe; Vance Wright

Father MC chronology
Close to You (1992)	Sex Is Law (1993)	This Is for the Players (1995)

Singles from Sex Is Law
- 1. "69" Released: 1993; 2. "I Beeped You" Released: January 4, 1994

Professional ratings
Review scores
Source	Rating
Entertainment Weekly	B
RapReviews	6/10

Sex Is Law is the third studio album by American rapper Father MC and his only LP released under 'Father' moniker. It was released on June 15, 1993, via Uptown Records, marking his third and final studio album for the label. The album was produced by DJ Clark Kent, Ski Beatz, Teddy Riley, DJ Eddie F, Kev 'Boogie' Smith, Mark Spark, Pete Rock, Ty Fyffe, and Vance Wright, with "Buttnaked" Tim Dawg and Father MC serving as executive producers. It was supported with two singles: "69" and cassette only single "I Beeped You".

== Track listing ==
No.	Title	Writer(s)	Producer(s)	Length
1.	"69"	Timothy M. Brown; Edward Theodore Riley; Timothy Patterson; Robert Earl Bell; Ronald N. Bell; Donald Wesley Boyce; George Melvin Brown; Robert Spike Mickens; Claydes Eugene Smith; Dennis Ronald Thomas; Richard Allen Westfield	Teddy Riley	4:25
2.	"R&B Swinger"	T. Brown; Peter O. Phillips; Patterson	Pete Rock	3:52
3.	"Sex Is Law"	T. Brown; Rodolfo Franklin; Patterson; Horace Brown; Dennis Earle Lambert; Francine Vicki Golde; Duane S. Hitchings	DJ Clark Kent	4:51
4.	"Once She Gets Pumpin'"	T. Brown; Tyrone Fyffe	Teddy Riley; Ty Fyffe	4:20
5.	"On and On"	T. Brown; Mark Sparks	Mark Spark	3:47
6.	"I Beeped You"	T. Brown; Edward Ferrell; Patterson; James Brown; Berry Gordy; Alphonso J. Mizell; Frederick J. Perren; Deke Richards; John H. Starks; Fred A. Wesley	DJ Eddie F	4:14
7.	"Ain't Nuttin' but a Party"	T. Brown; David Willis; Patterson	Ski	4:21
8.	"Now Is the Time"	T. Brown; Franklin; Patterson; Crystal Johnson	DJ Clark Kent	4:07
9.	"For the Brothers Who Ain't Here"	T. Brown; Kevin L. Smith; Tyrone Wilkins; Daryl Hall; John Oates	Kev 'Boogie' Smith	4:12
10.	"The Wiggle"	T. Brown; Franklin; Patterson	DJ Clark Kent; Ski	3:48
11.	"Something from the Radio"	Vance Wright	Vance Wright	4:27
Total length:				46:24

== Personnel ==
- Timothy "Father MC" Brown – vocals, executive producer
- Teddy Riley – producer (tracks: 1, 4)
- Peter "Pete Rock" Phillips – producer (track 2)
- Rodolfo "DJ Clark Kent" Franklin – producer (tracks: 3, 8, 10)
- Tyrone "Ty" Fyffe – producer (track 4)
- Mark Spark – producer (track 5)
- Edward "DJ Eddie F." Ferrell – producer (track 6)
- David "Ski" Willis – producer (tracks: 7, 10)
- Kevin "Kev Boogie" Smith – producer (track 9)
- Vance Wright – producer (track 11)
- Timothy "Buttnaked Tim Dawg" Patterson – executive producer
