= Brand New (Sista song) =

Single by Sista

from the album 4 All the Sistas Around da World
- B-side: "Sista Bounce"
- Released: October 17, 1994
- Genre: Hip-hop soul
- Length: 4:25
- Label: Elektra
- Songwriter: Melissa Elliott
- Producers: DeVante Swing; Timbaland

Sista singles chronology
"First Move" (1991)	"Brand New" (1994)	"It's Alright" (1995)

Missy Elliott singles chronology
"That's What Little Girls Are Made Of" (1993)	"Brand New" (1994)	"Ooh, Ooh Baby" (1996)

"Brand New" is a song by American R&B group Sista, in which a then-unknown Missy Elliott was a member of. The song was released as the only promotional single for the group's 1993 album 4 All the Sistas Around da World, which was eventually shelved after the single's release.

== Release and reception ==
The song peaked at number 84 on the Hot R&B/Hip-Hop Singles & Tracks chart.

== Track listings ==
12-inch vinyl

1. "Brand New (LP Mix)" – 4:25
2. "Sista Bounce" – 2:33
3. "Brand New (Mr. Dalvin's Ferrari Mix)" – 4:00
4. "Brand New (Timbaland's Beamer Mix)" – 4:32

== Chart performance ==
Chart (1994)	Peak position
U.S. Hot R&B/Hip-Hop Singles & Tracks	84
