= Close to You (Father MC album) =

Studio album by Father MC
- Released: May 19, 1992
- Recorded: 1991–1992
- Studios: Greene St. Recording (New York, NY); The Playground Studios (Closter, NJ); Chung King House of Metal (New York, NY); Soundtrack Studios (New York, NY)
- Genre: Hip hop
- Length: 52:14
- Label: Uptown
- Producers: Dave "Jam" Hall; DJ Eddie F.; Howie Tee; Mark Rooney; Nevelle Hodge; Prince Markie Dee

Father MC chronology
Father's Day (1990)	Close to You (1992)	Sex Is Law (1993)

Singles from Close to You
- 1. "One Nite Stand" Released: February 11, 1992; 2. "Everything's Gonna Be Alright" Released: November 3, 1992

Professional ratings
Review scores
Source	Rating
AllMusic	3/5 stars

Close to You is the second studio album by American rapper Father MC. It was released on May 19, 1992, via Uptown Records. The recording sessions took place at Greene St. Recording, Chung King House of Metal and Soundtrack Studios in New York and The Playground Studios in Closter. The album was produced by Cory Rooney, Prince Markie Dee, DJ Eddie F., Dave "Jam" Hall, Howie Tee, and Nevelle Hodge. The album peaked at number 185 on the Billboard 200 and number 34 on the Top R&B Albums charts in the United States.

It was supported with two singles: "One Nite Stand" and "Everything's Gonna Be Alright". Its lead single, "One Nite Stand", reached number 16 on the Hot Dance Music/Maxi-Singles Sales and number 22 on the Hot R&B/Hip-Hop Songs. The second single off of the album, "Everything's Gonna Be Alright", made it to number 37 on the Billboard Hot 100, number 9 on the Hot Dance Music/Maxi-Singles Sales, number 24 on the Hot R&B/Hip-Hop Songs, number 2 on the Hot Rap Songs and number 28 on the Rhythmic Top 40 charts. An accompanying music video for the song was directed by Drew Carolan.

AllMusic's Alex Henderson gave the album a favorable review, noting that the "release demonstrates that pop-rap can have integrity", and calling the work "a solid, enjoyable follow-up".

== Track listing ==
No.	Title	Writer(s)	Producer(s)	Length
1.	"All I Want"	Timothy Brown; Dave Hall; Gerald Hubbard, Jr.; Jesse Johnson	Dave "Jam" Hall	4:34
2.	"One Nite Stand"	Brown; Edward Ferrell; Alan Gorrie; Hamish Stuart; Malcolm Duncan; Owen McIntyre; Roger Ball; Steve Ferrone	DJ Eddie F.	5:28
3.	"Close to You"	Brown; Ferrell; Damon Johnson; Mark C. Rooney; Mark Morales; Kevin McCord	DJ Eddie F.; Nevelle Hodge	5:23
4.	"Everything's Gonna Be Alright"	Brown; Johnson; Rooney; Morales	Cory Rooney; Prince Markie Dee	3:44
5.	"Do the One, Two"	Brown; Ferrell; George Clinton; Bernie Worrell; William Collins	DJ Eddie F.	4:45
6.	"Red Lace Lingerie"	Brown; Johnson; Rooney; Morales; Allan Felder; Kenneth M. Burke; Norma Jean Wright	Cory Rooney; Prince Markie Dee	5:12
7.	"My Body"	Brown; Rooney; Morales	Cory Rooney; Prince Markie Dee	4:38
8.	"Ladies, I Luv 'Em"	Brown; Rooney; Morales	Cory Rooney; Prince Markie Dee	5:25
9.	"Baby We Can Do It"	Brown; Johnson; Rooney; Morales; Harold Clayton; Sigidi Abdullah	Cory Rooney; Prince Markie Dee	6:06
10.	"Go Natalie"	Tyrone Wilkins; Howard Thompson	Howie Tee	3:24
11.	"On the Road Again"	Brown; Rooney; Morales	Cory Rooney; Prince Markie Dee	4:00
Total length:				52:14

Sample credits

- Track 1 contains music from "Affection" performed by Tamara & the Seen.
- Track 2 contains samples from "School Boy Crush / Groovin' the Night Away" performed by Average White Band and "Funky Sensation / Have a Good Time" performed by Gwen McCrae.
- Track 3 contains samples from "I Want to Thank You" performed by Alicia Myers and "Impeach the President" performed by the Honeydrippers.
- Track 4 contains samples from "Good Times", performed by Chic.
- Track 5 contains samples from "Flashlight" performed by Parliament.

== Personnel ==
- Timothy "Father MC" Brown – vocals, executive producer
- Melissa Pierre – background vocals (track 1)
- Terri Robinson – background vocals (track 1)
- Mary J. Blige – background vocals (tracks: 2, 5)
- Clinton Wike – background vocals (track 3)
- Kenneth G. Greene – background vocals (tracks: 3, 5)
- Jeff Sanders – background vocals (track 3)
- Cedric "K-Ci" Hailey – background vocals (track 4)
- Joel "Jo Jo" Hailey – background vocals (track 4)
- Brenda Reid – background vocals (track 6)
- Danyale Dixon – background vocals (tracks: 7, 9)
- Mark Cory Rooney – background vocals (tracks: 7, 11), keyboards, producer, vocal arrangement, recording & mixing (tracks: 4, 6-9, 11)
- Jeanette Herndon – background vocals (track 9)
- Tiffany Wilson – background vocals (track 9)
- Henry "Hanky" Grate – guitar (tracks: 4, 7, 10)
- Mark "Prince Markie Dee" Morales – drum machine, producer, vocal arrangement, recording & mixing (tracks: 4, 6-9, 11)
- Dave "Jam" Hall – producer, recording & mixing (track 1)
- Edward "DJ Eddie F." Ferrell – producer, recording & mixing (tracks: 2, 3, 5)
- Maurice "Nevelle" Hodge – producer (track 3)
- Howard "Howie Tee" Thompson – producer (track 10)
- Michael Fossenkemper – recording & mixing (track 10)
- Rod Hui – engineering (track 1)
- Kevin Reynolds – engineering (track 2)
- David Dachinger – engineering (tracks: 3, 5)
- Mike Fronda – engineering (tracks: 4, 6-9, 11)
- Tony Maserati – engineering (tracks: 4, 6-9, 11)
- Jack Hersca – engineering (track 6), engineering assistant (tracks: 3, 4, 7-9, 11)
- Dgingi Brown – engineering assistant (track 1)
- John Kogan – engineering assistant (tracks: 2, 5)
- Dan Wojnar – engineering assistant (tracks: 4, 6-9, 11)
- José L. Rodriguez – mastering
- Andre Harrell – executive producer
- Steve Lucas – executive producer
- Sean "Puff Daddy" Combs – executive producer (track 10)
- Carol Friedman – art direction, photography
- Primary – design
- Crystal M. Johnson – production coordinator
- Vartan Kurjian – creative director
- Ellen Silverstein – stylist
- Quietfire – stylist

== Chart history ==
Chart (1992–1993)	Peak position
US Billboard 200	185
US Top R&B/Hip-Hop Albums (Billboard)	34
