= Ronin (comics) =

Ronin, in comics, may refer to:

- Ronin (DC Comics), a DC graphic novel by Frank Miller
- Ronin (Marvel Comics), a Marvel Comics character

== See also ==
- Ronin (disambiguation)
- Ronan the Accuser, another Marvel character
