= Gotta Love =

Single by Jodeci

from the album Forever My Lady
- Released: February 24, 1991
- Genre: New jack swing
- Length: 4:43
- Label: Uptown/MCA
- Songwriters: DeVante Swing; K-Ci Hailey
- Producer: DeVante Swing

Jodeci singles chronology
| "Lisa Baby" (1991) | "Gotta Love" (1991) | "Forever My Lady" (1991) |

Music video
- "Gotta Love" on YouTube

"Gotta Love" is the debut single by American R&B group Jodeci. It is a new jack swing song and is also the lead single of their debut album Forever My Lady. The song was released on February 24, 1991. The music video introduced the group's unique streetwear style.

== Background ==
The first single from Jodeci's debut album Forever My Lady and the group's debut single overall, "Gotta Love" is a new jack swing track. Sean Combs, at the time a recent A&R promotee at Uptown Records, advocated to the group and label that the song be Jodeci's first single.

== Music video ==
The music video for "Gotta Love" introduced the streetwear style of the group, which differentiated them from other male R&B singers at the time. After convincing Uptown Records music executive Andre Harrell, stylist and fashion designer Misa Hylton, then Combs' newly hired assistant, styled the group in the video, her first project, in hoodies, baggy jeans, and combat boots, setting them apart from the predominant suits and hard-bottomed shoes.

== Track listing ==
=== Vinyl, 12", Single, 33 ⅓ RPM ===
Adapted from the disc label.

Side A
| No. | Title | Length |
|---|---|---|
| 1. | "Gotta Love (New R&B Edit)" | 4:19 |
| 2. | "Gotta Love (New Video Edit)" | 4:11 |
| 3. | "Gotta Love (Swing Act)" | 5:36 |

Side B
| No. | Title | Length |
|---|---|---|
| 1. | "Gotta Love (Hip Hop)" | 5:34 |
| 2. | "Gotta Love (Daddy Hip Hop)" | 4:45 |
| 3. | "Gotta Love (12" Edit)" | 6:45 |

=== CD ===
Two different versions of the compact disc promotional single exist. These tracklists are adapted from the discs' labels.

Version 1
| No. | Title | Length |
|---|---|---|
| 1. | "Gotta Love (New R&B Edit)" | 4:19 |
| 2. | "Gotta Love (New Video Edit)" | 4:11 |
| 3. | "Gotta Love (Swing Act)" | 5:36 |
| 4. | "Gotta Love (Hip Hop)" | 5:34 |
| 5. | "Gotta Love (Daddy Hip Hop)" | 4:45 |
| 6. | "Gotta Love (12" Edit)" | 6:45 |

Version 2
| No. | Title | Length |
|---|---|---|
| 1. | "Gotta Love (Daddy Hip Hop)" | 4:46 |
| 2. | "Gotta Love (Swing RnB)" | 4:03 |
| 3. | "Gotta Love (Daddy RnB)" | 4:19 |
| 4. | "Gotta Love (Swing Bass)" | 4:46 |
| 5. | "Gotta Love (Instrumental Daddy RnB)" | 4:19 |
| 6. | "Gotta Love (Daddy Hip Hop Instrumental)" | 4:46 |

== Personnel ==
Adapted from the vinyl disc label.

- engineering: Paul Logus, Mike Mangini
- production: DeVante Swing
- remixing: DeVante Swing, Puff Daddy
- K-Ci Hailey - Lead & Background vocals
- JoJo Hailey - Background vocals
- DeVante Swing - Rap and Background vocals
- Mr. Dalvin - Background vocals

== Chart performance ==
| Chart (1991) | Peak position |
|---|---|
| U.S. Hot R&B/Hip-Hop Singles & Tracks | 79 |
