= Father's Day (Father MC album) =

Studio album by Father MC
- Released: October 15, 1990
- Recorded: 1989–1990
- Studio: Chung King House of Metal (New York, NY); Gordy Groove Recording (Brooklyn, NY); Howie's Crib (Brooklyn, NY)
- Genre: Hip hop
- Length: 42:00
- Label: Uptown; MCA
- Producer: Fresh Gordon; Howie Tee; Mark Rooney; Prince Markie Dee

Father MC chronology
Father's Day (1990)	Close to You (1992)

Singles from Father's Day
- 1. "Treat Them Like They Want to Be Treated" Released: July 2, 1990; 2. "I'll Do 4 U" Released: October 5, 1990; 3. "Lisa Baby" Released: January 18, 1991; 4. "I've Been Watching You" Released: August 13, 1991

Father's Day is the debut studio album by American rapper Father MC. It released in October 1990 through Uptown/MCA Records. The album was produced by Cory Rooney, Prince Markie Dee, Fresh Gordon, and Howie Tee, with Andre Harrell and Sean "Puffy" Combs serving as executive producers. It features guest appearance from Lady Kazan and contributions from K-Ci & JoJo, Cory Rooney, Dave Hollister, and Mary J. Blige.

The album peaked at number 62 on the Billboard 200 and number 23 on the Top R&B/Hip-Hop Albums in the United States, and number 24 in New Zealand. It was supported with four singles: "Treat Them Like They Want to Be Treated", "I'll Do 4 U", "Lisa Baby" and "I've Been Watching You".

== Critical reception ==
Professional ratings
Review scores
Source	Rating
AllMusic	4/5 stars
The Source	2.5/5 stars

While AllMusic's Rob Theakston felt some of the material on the album could be considered formulaic, he acknowledged the importance of the work, stating that "the impact of Father's Day's tone and textures would be felt for years to come". Chris Wilder of The Source criticized Father MC for using a ghostwriter, and was also dissatisfied with his vocal performance, saying that on the first half of the album his rhyming felt worse than background vocals.

== Track listing ==
No.	Title	Writer(s)	Producer(s)	Length
1.	"I'll Do 4 U"	Timothy Brown; Cheryl Lynn; David Paich; David Foster	Cory Rooney; Prince Markie Dee	3:07
2.	"Treat Them Like They Want to Be Treated"	Brown; Mark C. Rooney	Cory Rooney; Prince Markie Dee	5:49
3.	"Lisa Baby"	Brown; Rooney; Mark Morales	Cory Rooney; Prince Markie Dee	4:58
4.	"Tell Me Something Good"	Stevie Wonder	Fresh Gordon	3:50
5.	"I Come Correct"	Brown; Rooney	Cory Rooney; Prince Markie Dee	4:17
6.	"I've Been Watching You" (featuring Lady Kazan)	Tyrone Wilkins; Gordon Pickett	Fresh Gordon	3:50
7.	"Ain't It Funky"	Wilkins; Rooney; Morales	Cory Rooney; Prince Markie Dee	4:44
8.	"Father's Day"	Wilkins; Howard Thompson	Howie Tee	3:49
9.	"Dance 4 Me"	Wilkins; Thompson	Howie Tee	3:42
10.	"Why U Wanna Hurt Me"	Brown; Rooney	Cory Rooney; Prince Markie Dee	3:54
Total length:				42:00

== Personnel ==
- Timothy "Father MC" Brown – vocals
- Dave Hollister – background vocals (track 1)
- Mary J. Blige – background vocals (track 1)
- Cedric "K-Ci" Hailey – background vocals (tracks: 2, 10)
- Joel "Jo Jo" Hailey – background vocals (tracks: 2, 10)
- Mark Cory Rooney – background vocals & background arrangements (track 2), keyboards & producer (tracks: 1–3, 5, 7, 10), drum programming (track 1)
- Lady Kazan – vocals (track 6)
- Mark "Prince Markie Dee" Morales – drum programming & producer (tracks: 1–3, 5, 7, 10), background arrangements (track 2)
- Gordon "Fresh Gordon" Pickett – recording, mixing & producer (tracks: 4, 6)
- Howard "Howie Tee" Thompson – programming, producer, recording & mixing (tracks: 8, 9)
- John Pace – recording (tracks: 1, 3, 7), mixing (tracks: 3, 7)
- Steven Ett – recording (track 2), mixing (tracks: 1, 2, 5, 10)
- Chuck Valle – recording (track 2)
- Franklyn Grant – recording (tracks: 5, 10)
- José Rodriguez – mastering
- Andre Harrell – executive producer
- Sean "Puff Daddy" Combs – executive producer
- Carol Friedman – art direction, photography
- Patrick Roques – design
- Eloise Bryan – production coordinator

== Chart history ==
=== Album ===
Chart (1991)	Peak position
New Zealand Albums (RMNZ)	24
US Billboard 200	62
US Top R&B/Hip-Hop Albums (Billboard)	23

=== Singles ===
Year	Single	Peak chart positions			
Year	Single	U.S. Billboard Hot 100	U.S. Hot Dance Music/Maxi-Singles Sales	U.S. Hot R&B/Hip-Hop Singles Sales	U.S. Hot Rap Songs
1990	"Treat Them Like They Want to Be Treated"	—	36	14	1
1990	"I'll Do 4 U"	20	11	14	20
1991	"Lisa Baby"	—	42	—	87
1991	"I've Been Watching You"	—	—	92	—
