= Rounin =

Rounin may refer to:

- Rōnin, a samurai without a lord or master
- Rounin (TV series), a Philippine television series

== See also ==
- Ronin (disambiguation)
