= Ronin (disambiguation) =

A rōnin is a Japanese feudal samurai without a lord or master.

Ronin or rōnin, may also refer to:

== People ==
- Rōnin (student), a student studying outside of the school system for entrance in a future year

=== Persons ===
- Carlos Newton or "The Ronin", mixed martial arts fighter

==== Persons with the given name ====
- Hiraga Gennai or Tenjiku Rōnin, Edo-period Japanese pharmacologist
- Ronin O'Connor (born 2001), Australian rules footballer
- Ronin Ro, U.S. author

==== Persons with the surname ====
- Daniel Perez (better known as "Bugz Ronin"), record producer and songwriter
- Costa Ronin (born 1979), actor and cinematographer
- Samuil Ronin (born 1910), Russian social scientist
- Vladimir Ronin, construction researcher

=== Fictional characters ===
- Ronin (Ninjago), a character in Ninjago
- Ronin (Marvel Comics), an alias used by several Marvel Comics characters
- Ronin (Marvel Cinematic Universe), a character in the Marvel Cinematic Universe
- Ronin (Star Trek character), a character from the Star Trek: The Next Generation episode "Sub Rosa" (Star Trek: The Next Generation)
- Ronin Mage, a fictional character from The Witcher (TV series)

== Places ==
- Ronin, Poland, a village

== Events ==
- Rings Lithuania: Ronin, a 2003 mixed-martial-arts tournament

== Groups. organizations ==
- Ronin Films, Australian film distribution company
- Ronin Publishing, book publisher specializing in psychedelic and drug literature

=== Bands ===
- Ronin (band), a four-member hard rock band based in Singapore
- Ronin, a "zen-funk" group led by Nik Bärtsch

=== Fictional organizations ===
- The Ronin, a fictional gang in Saints Row 2

== Transportation and vehicular ==
- TVS Ronin, a motor cruiser by TVS Motor Company
- Fisker Ronin, battery-electric sports car

=== Fictional vehicles ===
- Ronin, a Titan class in Titanfall 2 (2016)

== Arts, entertainment, media ==
- Ronin (video game), a 2015 video game by Tomasz Wacławek published by Devolver Digital

=== Literature ===
- Rōnin (DC Comics), a graphic novel by Frank Miller
- X-Men: Ronin, a Marvel Comics limited series comic book set in the Marvel Mangaverse
- Star Wars: Ronin: A Visions Novel, a 2021 alternate history novel

=== Music ===
==== Albums ====
- Rōnin I, a 2021 album by UK group Unkle
- Rōnin II, a 2022 album by UK group Unkle; see Unkle discography

==== Songs ====
- "Ronin" (Bushido song), a 2019 song by Bushido off the album Carlo Cokxxx Nutten 4
- "Ronin" (Sturgill Simpson song), a 2019 song by Sturgill Simpson off the album Sound & Fury
- "Rōnin", a song by Ibaraki on the upcoming album Rashomon

=== Stage and screen ===
- Ronin (film), a 1998 action thriller by John Frankenheimer
- "Ronin" (Hawkeye episode), an episode from the TV series Hawkeye inspired by Marvel Comics

== Other uses ==
- DJI Ronin, a camera stabilization product line

== See also ==
- Forty-seven rōnin (disambiguation)
- 5 Ronin, comic book limited series
- Green Ronin Publishing, a role-playing game publisher
- Ronin Arts, a role-playing game company
- Ronin Network, an Ethereum sidechain
- Lego Ninjago: Shadow of Ronin, a 2015 video game developed by TT Games
- Ronin Warriors, an anime television series by Hajime Yatate
- Rurouni Kenshin, a manga series by Nobuhiro Watsuki
- Palpifer ronin (P. ronin), a moth
- Ryōnin (良忍, 1072–1132), a Tendai Buddhist monk
- Rounin (disambiguation)
- Ronan (disambiguation)
