= Ronan (disambiguation) =

Rónán, anglicised as Ronan, is a given name and surname of people and fictional characters.

Ronan may also refer to:

- Ronan (album), by Ronan Keating, 2000
- "Ronan" (song), by Taylor Swift, 2012 and re-recorded 2021
- "Ronan", by Kamaal Williams, from Stings (album), 2023
- Ronan, Montana, a city in the United States
- Ronan (footballer, born 1994), Brazilian footballer Ronan Queiroz de Paula Afonso
- Ronan (footballer, born 1995), Brazilian footballer Ronan David Jerônimo
- Ronan Team, a sniper and reconnaissance company of the Main Directorate of Intelligence (Ukraine)

== See also ==
- Ronin (disambiguation)
