= I'll Do 4 U =

1990 single by Father MC

Single by Father MC

from the album Father's Day
- Released: October 5, 1990
- Recorded: February 1990
- Genre: Hip hop, new jack swing
- Length: 3:03
- Label: Uptown/MCA
- Songwriters: Timothy Brown, David Foster, Cheryl Lynn, David Paich
- Producers: Mark Morales, Mark C. Rooney

Father MC singles chronology
"Treat Them Like They Want to Be Treated" (1990)	"I'll Do 4 U" (1990)	"Lisa Baby" (1991)

"I'll Do 4 U" is a song by American hip hop artist Father MC, with background vocals by R&B artist Mary J. Blige. The song was recorded for Father MC's debut album, Father's Day (1990), and was released as the second single for the album in October 1990. It samples "Got to Be Real" by Cheryl Lynn from 1978. The official music video was directed by Antoine Fuqua. "I'll Do 4 U" peaked at numbers 20 and 45 on the US Billboard Hot 100 and Cash Box Top 100 charts.

== Track listings ==
- 12", vinyl
1. "I'll Do 4 U" (Radio Version) - 3:03
2. "I'll Do 4 U" (Extended Version) - 5:04
3. "I'll Do 4 U" (Acappella) - 5:06
- 12", vinyl (promo)
1. "I'll Do 4 U" (Radio Version) - 3:03
2. "I'll Do 4 U" (Radio Instrumental) - 3:03
3. "I'll Do 4 U" (Extended Version) - 5:04
4. "I'll Do 4 U" (Extended Instrumental) - 5:04
5. "I'll Do 4 U" (Acappella) - 5:06

== Personnel ==
Information taken from Discogs.

- executive production: Andre Harrell, Sean Combs
- production: Mark Morales, Mark C. Rooney

== Charts ==
=== Weekly charts ===
Chart (1990–1991)	Peak position
New Zealand (Recorded Music NZ)	1
US Billboard Hot 100	20
US Hot Dance Music/Maxi-Singles Sales (Billboard)	11
US Hot R&B Singles (Billboard)	14
US Hot Rap Singles (Billboard)	1
US Cash Box Top 100	45

=== Year-end charts ===
Chart (1991)	Position
New Zealand (Recorded Music NZ)	11
