= Diary of a Mad Band =

Studio album by Jodeci
- Released: December 21, 1993
- Recorded: July–November 1993
- Studios: Hit Factory, New York City; Chung King, New York City
- Genres: Hip-hop soul; soul; R&B
- Length: 66:03
- Labels: Uptown; MCA
- Producers: Mr. Dalvin; DeVante Swing

Jodeci chronology
Forever My Lady (1991)	Diary of a Mad Band (1993)	The Show, the After Party, the Hotel (1995)

Singles from Diary of a Mad Band
- 1. "Cry for You" Released: November 23, 1993; 2. "Feenin'" Released: March 8, 1994; 3. "What About Us" Released: August 2, 1994

Diary of a Mad Band is the second studio album by American R&B group Jodeci. It was released on December 21, 1993, through Uptown Records and distributed by MCA Records. The album also featured the first-ever album appearances from Timbaland & Magoo, S.B.I, Missy Elliott (credited as Misdemeanor) and Sista, two years before the latter group became known in the music industry. New Jersey rapper Redman also makes a guest appearance on the album. It was Jodeci's second album to reach number one on the R&B album chart, where it stayed for two weeks. It spawned the number 1 R&B hit "Cry for You"; the number 2 R&B hit "Feenin'", and the Top 15 R&B hit "What About Us". Despite not being released as a single, the album's opening track, "My Heart Belongs to U", was also an urban radio hit with it peaking at number 55 and charting for 20 weeks on the Billboard R&B/Hip-Hop Airplay chart. To date, the album has sold over four million copies in the United States and six million worldwide.

== Critical reception ==
Professional ratings
Review scores
Source	Rating
AllMusic	4/5 stars
Chicago Tribune	2/4 stars
Christgau's Consumer Guide	(neither)
Entertainment Weekly	B+
Los Angeles Times	3/4 stars
Music Week	3/5 stars
Orlando Sentinel	2/5 stars

Dimitri Ehrlich of Entertainment Weekly wrote that at times bested the group's first, stating that the songs on their sophomore effort "often transcend the formulaic histrionics that marred their debut." AllMusic critic Ron Wynn deemed the record "jarring" and "mismatched", preferring its sentimental love songs to the sexually explicit, hip hop-influenced "come-on numbers", which he found to be in poor taste. Rohan B. Preston from the Chicago Tribune found the lyrics clichéd and Jodeci "certainly not as funky as H-Town nor as stirring as Boyz II Men at their best". Robert Christgau was even less impressed and assigned it a "neither" symbol in his Consumer Guide book, indicating an album that "may impress once or twice with consistent craft or an arresting track or two. Then it won't."

== Track listing ==
No.	Title	Writer(s)	Length
1.	"My Heart Belongs to U"	Donald Earle DeGrate, Jr.	5:02
2.	"Cry for You"	DeGrate	5:01
3.	"Feenin'"	DeGrate	5:10
4.	"What About Us"	DeGrate; Devell Moore	5:20
5.	"Ride & Slide"	DeGrate	4:57
6.	"Alone"	DeGrate; Dalvin DeGrate	4:43
7.	"You Got It" (featuring Redman)	DeGrate; Reginald Noble	5:56
8.	"Won't Waste You" (featuring Missy Elliott)	Cedric Renard Hailey; Melissa Elliott	4:55
9.	"In the Meanwhile" (featuring Timbaland)	DeGrate; Timothy Mosley	4:22
10.	"Gimme All You Got"	DeGrate; Joel Hailey; Cedric Renard Hailey; Dalvin DeGrate	3:42
11.	"Sweaty" (featuring Missy Elliott)	DeGrate; Dalvin DeGrate; Elliott	5:54
12.	"Jodecidal Hotline"	Dalvin DeGrate	3:11

Jodeci-CD bonus track
No.	Title	Writer(s)	Length
13.	"Success"	K-Ci Hailey; Dalvin DeGrate	7:41

== Charts ==
=== Weekly charts ===
Chart (1994)	Peak position
Australian Albums (ARIA)	99
US Billboard 200	3
US Top R&B/Hip-Hop Albums (Billboard)	1

=== Year-end charts ===
Chart (1994)	Position
US Billboard 200	41
US Top R&B/Hip-Hop Albums (Billboard)	6

=== Singles ===
Year	Single	Peak chart positions		
Year	Single	U.S. Billboard Hot 100	U.S. Hot R&B/Hip-Hop Singles & Tracks	U.S. Rhythmic Top 40
1993	"Cry for You"	15	1	5
1994	"Feenin'"	25	2	16
1994	"What About Us"	—	14	—

"—" denotes releases that did not chart.

== Certifications ==
Region	Certification	Certified units/sales
United States (RIAA)	2× Platinum	2,000,000^{^}
^{^} Shipments figures based on certification alone.

== Personnel ==
Information taken from Allmusic.

- arranging – Dalvin DeGrate, Cedric "K-Ci" Hailey, DeVante Swing
- recording engineer – Prince Charles Alexander
- assistant engineer – Steve Fitzmaurice
- creative director – Brett Wright
- scratches - Timbaland
- executive producers – Tim Dawg, Andre Harrell, Jodeci, Steve Lucas
- guitar – Darryl Pearson
- horn – Charles "Prince Charles" Alexander
- mastering – Chris Gehringer
- mixing – Charles "Prince Charles" Alexander, Bob Brockman, Dalvin DeGrate, Steve Fitzmaurice, Tony Maserati, DeVante Swing, John Wydrycs
- multi-instruments – Dalvin DeGrate, DeVante Swing
- talkbox - Mike "Funky Mike" Jackson
- photography – Daniel Hastings
- production – Mr. Dalvin, DeVante Swing
- production coordination – Dean "Mr. Magoo" Moodie
- vocal consultant – Kenny Hicks
- backing vocals – Jodeci
- guest vocals – Redman, Timbaland, Sista, Magoo, S.B.I. and Misdemeanor

== See also ==
- List of number-one R&B albums of 1994 (U.S.)
