= Treat Them Like They Want to Be Treated =

Single by Father MC

from the album Father's Day
- Released: July 2, 1990
- Recorded: January–February 1990
- Genre: New jack swing
- Length: 5:48
- Label: Uptown/MCA
- Songwriter(s): Father MC, Cory Rooney

Father MC singles chronology
"Treat Them Like They Want to Be Treated" (1990)	"I'll Do 4 U" (1990)

Jodeci singles chronology
"Treat Them Like They Want to Be Treated" (1990)	"Lisa Baby" (1991)

"Treat Them Like They Want to Be Treated" is a song by American hip hop artist Father MC, and features backing vocals by K-Ci and Jo-Jo, Devante Swing, and Mr. Dalvin, members of then-up-and-coming R&B group Jodeci. It was recorded for Father MC's debut album Father's Day, and released as its debut single in July, 1990.

== Track listings ==
12", CD, Vinyl

1. "Treat Them Like They Want to Be Treated" (Regular Version) - 5:47
2. "Treat Them Like They Want to Be Treated" (Short Version) - 5:07
3. "Treat Them Like They Want to Be Treated" (Drum Drops) - 5:49
4. "Treat Them Like They Want to Be Treated" (Instrumental) - 5:08

33⅓ RPM, Promo

1. "Treat Them Like They Want to Be Treated" (Club Mix) - 5:17
2. "Treat Them Like They Want to Be Treated" (House Mix) - 4:00
3. "Treat Them Like They Want to Be Treated" (Club Instrumental) - 5:24
4. "Treat Them Like They Want to Be Treated" (R&B Remix) - 4:15
5. "Treat Them Like They Want to Be Treated" (Awesome Remix) - 5:19
6. "Treat Them Like They Want to Be Treated" (R&B Remix Instrumental) - 4:15
7. "Treat Them Like They Want to Be Treated" (Awesome Instrumental) - 5:19

== Personnel ==
Information taken from Discogs.

- executive production: Andre Harrell, Puff Daddy
- production: Mark Morales, Mark Rooney
- remixing: Mark Morales, Mark Rooney, Special K, Teddy Tedd
- writing: Father MC, Mark Rooney

== Chart performance ==
Chart (1990)	Peak position
U.S. Hot Dance Music/Maxi-Singles Sales	36
U.S. Hot R&B/Hip-Hop Singles & Tracks	14
U.S. Hot Rap Singles	1
