= What About Us (Jodeci song) =

Single by Jodeci

from the album Diary of a Mad Band
- Released: August 2, 1994
- Recorded: 1993
- Genre: R&B, soul
- Length: 5:20 4:32 (7" edit)
- Label: Uptown/MCA
- Songwriters: DeVante Swing, Devell Moore, Roger Troutman, Larry Troutman, Shirley Murdock
- Producer: DeVante Swing

Jodeci singles chronology
"Feenin'" (1994)	"What About Us" (1994)	"Freek'n You" (1995)

Magoo singles chronology
""What About Us (Swing Mob)"" (1994)	"Beep Me 911" (1998)

"What About Us" is a song by American R&B group Jodeci recorded for their second album Diary of a Mad Band (1993). The song was released as the third and final single for the album in August 1994.

A "Swing Mob" remix of the song featured additional production by Timbaland and introduced former Swing Mob member Magoo.

== Track listings ==
US Promo Vinyl and 12"

1. "What About Us" (Radio) - 4:25
2. "What About Us" (Album Extended) - 4:38
3. "What About Us" (Album Instrumental) - 4:38
4. "What About Us" (Acapella) - 4:38
5. "What About Us" (Jeep Mix) - 4:40

US Vinyl and 12"

1. "What About Us" (Album Version) - 5:20
2. "What About Us" (Swing Mob) - 4:36
  (feat. Magoo)
3. "What About Us" (Mr. Dalvin Version) - 4:26
  (feat. Mr. Dalvin)

== Personnel ==
Information taken from Discogs.

- production: DeVante Swing
- remixing: DeVante Swing, Mr. Dalvin, Timbaland
- Joel "JoJo" Hailey - Lead and Background vocals
- Cedric "K-Ci" Hailey - Background vocals
- DeVante Swing - Background vocals
- Mr. Dalvin - Background vocals

== Charts ==
=== Weekly charts ===
Chart (1993–1994)	Peak position
US Bubbling Under Hot 100 (Billboard)	1
US Hot R&B/Hip-Hop Songs (Billboard)	14

=== Year-end charts ===
Chart (1994)	Position
US Hot R&B/Hip-Hop Songs (Billboard)	84
