= I've Been Watching You =

Single by Father MC featuring Lady Kazan

from the album Father's Day
- Released: August 13, 1991
- Recorded: 1990
- Genre: East Coast hip hop
- Length: 3:43
- Label: Uptown/MCA
- Songwriter: Fresh Gordon
- Producer: Fresh Gordon

Father MC featuring Lady Kazan singles chronology
"Lisa Baby" (1991)	"I've Been Watching You" (1991)

"I've Been Watching You" is a song by American hip hop artist Father MC which features Lady Kazan. The song was recorded for Father MC's debut album Father's Day and released as the fourth and final single for the album in August 1991.

== Track listing ==
12", 33 1/3 RPM, CD, Vinyl (Promo)

1. "I've Been Watching You" (Daddy Radio) - 4:03
2. "I've Been Watching You" (Album Version) - 3:43
3. "I've Been Watching You" (Redhead Kingpin Remix) - 3:42
4. "I've Been Watching You" (Fresh Gordon Remix) - 3:55
5. "I've Been Watching You" (Redhead Kingpin Instrumental) - 3:30

== Personnel ==
Information taken from Discogs.

- executive production – Sean "Puffy" Combs, Andre Harrell
- production – Fresh Gordon
- remixing – Sean "Puffy" Combs, Fresh Gordon, Redhead Kingpin
- writing – Fresh Gordon, Lil' Shawn

== Chart performance ==
Chart (1991)	Peak position
U.S. Hot R&B/Hip-Hop Singles & Tracks	92
