= Lisa Baby =

Single by Father MC featuring Jodeci

from the album Father's Day
- Released: January 18, 1991
- Recorded: December 1989 – September 1990
- Genre: Hip hop, East Coast hip hop
- Length: 4:56
- Label: Uptown/MCA
- Songwriter(s): Father MC, Mark Morales, Mark C. Rooney
- Producer(s): Mark Morales, Mark C. Rooney

Father MC singles chronology
"I'll Do 4 U" (1990)	"Lisa Baby" (1991)	"I've Been Watching You" (1991)

Jodeci singles chronology
"Treat Them Like They Want to Be Treated" (1990)	"Lisa Baby" (1991)	"Gotta Love" (1991)

"Lisa Baby" is a song by American hip hop artist Father MC, recorded for his debut album Father's Day. The single version of the song, which features R&B group Jodeci, was released in January 1991.

== Track listings ==
12", Vinyl

1. "Lisa Baby" (Daddy Radio) - 3:53
2. "Lisa Baby" (Hip Hop Fat Mix) - 5:00
3. "Lisa Baby" (Smoothed Out Mix) - 4:44
4. "Lisa Baby" (Album Version) - 4:56
5. "Lisa Baby" (Swing House) - 6:50
6. "Lisa Baby" (Instrumental) - 5:29

CD (Promo)

1. "Lisa Baby" (Daddy Radio) - 3:53
2. "Lisa Baby" (Hip Hop Fat Mix) - 5:00
3. "Lisa Baby" (Smoothed Out Mix) - 4:44
4. "Lisa Baby" (Swing House) - 6:50
5. "Lisa Baby" (Instrumental) - 5:29

== Personnel ==
Information taken from Discogs.

- production – Mark Morales, Mark C. Rooney
- remixing – DeVante Swing, Pete Rock
- vocals – Jodeci
- writing – Father MC, Mark Morales, Mark C. Rooney

== Chart performance ==
Chart (1991)	Peak position
U.S. Hot Dance Music/Maxi-Singles Sales	25
U.S. Hot R&B/Hip-Hop Singles Sales	87
