= Zakiya (singer) =

American singer

- Born: Zakiya Munnerlyn; 1977 (age 48–49); Hillside, New Jersey, U.S.
- Genres: R&B, soul, pop
- Occupation: singer
- Years active: 1992–1999
- Label: A&M / DV8

Zakiya A. Munnerlyn is a former American R&B/soul singer who released a self-titled studio album on DV8 Records in 1997. Two singles from the album, "Love Like Mine" and "My Love Won't Fade Away", entered Billboard's Hot R&B/Hip-Hop Songs chart.

== Career ==
As a 15-year-old, Zakiya was crowned Hal Jackson's Talented Teens Miss International Queen of 1992. Two years later, she signed with Ric Wake's production company as part of the girl group Faces. After a year with the group, Zakiya pursued a solo career and signed with DV8 Records in 1995.

Her debut single, "Love Like Mine", was released in 1996. A review of the song in Billboard, which compared Zakiya's musical style to that of Brandy, remarked that Zakiya "has the voice to be taken seriously [as] she slinks through a song that has a sing-along refrain that permanently sticks to the brain after the first listen." Andrew Hamilton of Allmusic was critical of the CD single for containing five different versions of the song. The music video for "Love Like Mine" was added to BET's video rotation, and the single peaked at number 60 on the Billboard Hot R&B/Hip-Hop Songs chart.

Zakiya's second single, "My Love Won't Fade Away", was released in 1997. The song features a guest rap by Charisma and a sample of Barry White's 1977 song "Playing Your Game, Baby". A Billboard review of "My Love Won't Fade Away" compared Zakiya's voice to that of a young Gladys Knight, and that she "exudes mucho star power on this sleek jeep-soul cruiser." The music video for the song was added to BET's video rotation and it reached number one on The Box's weekly video countdown in May 1997. Zakiya's self-titled debut album was also released that month, and "My Love Won't Fade Away" peaked at number 52 on the Billboard Hot R&B/Hip-Hop Songs chart.

A 12-inch single for "I Like" was released in 1998, in addition to another single ("I Wanna Be Where You Are"). An EP containing seven tracks slated for her second album appeared on vinyl later that year. However, Zakiya was dropped from DV8 before work on her second album was completed.

Currently retired from the music industry, in 2012 she opened a floral shop in Maplewood, New Jersey that is still open.

== Discography ==
=== Album ===
Album information
Zakiya
- Label: DV8 Records
- Released: May 6, 1997

=== Singles ===
Title	Year	Peak chart positions
Title	Year	US R&B
"Love Like Mine"	August 20, 1996	60
"My Love Won't Fade Away"	April 22, 1997	52
"I Like"	1998	—
"—" denotes release that has not charted.
