= Back to the Future Now: Live at Arizona Charlie's, Las Vegas =

Live album by Asleep at the Wheel
- Released: May 20, 1997
- Recorded: December 6 and 7, 1996
- Venue: Arizona Charlie's Decatur (Las Vegas)
- Genre: Country; Western swing
- Length: 54:19
- Label: Lucky Dog
- Producer: Ray Benson; Blake Chancey

Asleep at the Wheel chronology
The Wheel Keeps on Rollin' (1995)	Back to the Future Now: Live at Arizona Charlie's, Las Vegas (1997)	Merry Texas Christmas, Y'all (1997)

Back to the Future Now: Live at Arizona Charlie's, Las Vegas is the third live album by American country band Asleep at the Wheel. Recorded on December 6 and 7, 1996, at Arizona Charlie's Decatur in Las Vegas, it was produced by the band's frontman Ray Benson with Blake Chancey and released on May 20, 1997, by Sony Music imprint Lucky Dog. The album did not chart, spawned no single releases, and received mixed reviews from critics.

Asleep at the Wheel recorded Back to the Future Now at two shows on the tour in promotion of 1995's The Wheel Keeps on Rollin'. The album marks the debut of new members Jason Roberts and Chris Booher on fiddles, the latter of whom had recently taken over from Tim Alexander on piano (who features as a guest). Also featured are several former members of the group, including vocalists LeRoy Preston, Chris O'Connell, and steel guitarist Lucky Oceans.

== Background ==
In early 1997, Asleep at the Wheel signed as one of the first two artists (alongside David Allan Coe) on Lucky Dog, an imprint label set up by Sony Music in Nashville, Tennessee, for "older [country] acts and new roots artists". Back to the Future Now: Live at Arizona Charlie's, Las Vegas was issued as the label's first release on May 20, 1997. The album was recorded over the course of two shows on December 6 and 7, 1996 at Arizona Charlie's Decatur in Las Vegas tracked directly to a Sonic Studio remote recording station. It was produced by frontman Ray Benson with Blake Chancey, a co-founder of Lucky Dog. No singles were released from the album, but a music video was issued for "Boogie Back to Texas" directed by Dan Karlok, in which the band "cruises around various parts of the U.S. in its tour bus".

Speaking about the album in an interview with Los Angeles Times, Benson noted that "What I wanted to do this time was make a live record of all the songs that have come to be identified with us over the last 27 years, with the people who were identified with the songs ... Then I wanted to add the new people and do some new things because we have been described by a lot of people as our forte being the live show." The shows recorded for Back to the Future Now featured six former members of the band making guest appearances: vocalist and rhythm guitarist LeRoy Preston, pedal steel guitarist Lucky Oceans, vocalist Chris O'Connell, bassist Tony Garnier, and pianists Floyd Domino and Tim Alexander. The album is also the band's first to feature fiddler and mandolinist Jason Roberts, and pianist and fiddler Chris Booher.

== Reception ==
Professional ratings
Review scores
Source	Rating
AllMusic	3/5 stars

Critical reviews for Back to the Future Now were mixed. Billboard wrote that "this is the kind of kick-ass, feel-good music you hardly hear anymore outside the dance hall circuit," describing the album as "Great stuff". AllMusic's William Ruhlmann dubbed the album "a good primer of Asleep at the Wheel", although suggested that the release of another live record was "redundant". Similarly, Jerry Sharpe of the Pittsburgh Post-Gazette dubbed Back to the Future Now an "excellent sampler". Country Standard Time's George Hauenstein described the album as a "thoroughly enjoyable recording includ[ing] 12 of AATW's most popular songs".

Indianapolis Star writer Steve Hall was much more critical, complaining that "Most concert recordings bristle with energy; Back to the Future Now suggests that Ray Benson and his band should have slurped up a few pots of espresso before hitting the stage at Arizona Charlie's. Dan Fogelberg with two broken legs and a serious head cold would exude more liveliness. If Asleep at the Wheel was any more laid-back here, its name would be all too appropriate."

At the 40th Annual Grammy Awards, Asleep at the Wheel received a nomination in the category of Best Country Instrumental Performance for the song "Fat Boy Rag".

== Track listing ==
No.	Title	Writer(s)	Length
1.	"Ain't Nobody Here but Us Chickens"	Joan Whitney; Alex Kramer	4:30
2.	"Miles and Miles of Texas"	Tommy Camfield; Diane Johnston	4:19
3.	"Roly Poly"	Fred Rose	4:02
4.	"Ida Red"	Traditional (arr. Bob Wills, Tiny Moore)	4:00
5.	"My Baby Thinks She's a Train"	LeRoy Preston	5:39
6.	"The Letter That Johnny Walker Read"	Preston; Ray Benson; George Frayne	3:52
7.	"God Bless the Child"	Billie Holiday; Arthur Herzog Jr.	7:15
8.	"Fat Boy Rag"	Wills; Junior Barnard	3:55
9.	"Cherokee Boogie"	Moon Mullican; Chief William Redbird	3:58
10.	"Hot Rod Lincoln"	Charlie Ryan; W.S. Stevenson	4:38
11.	"Boogie Back to Texas"	Benson	3:43
12.	"House of Blue Lights"	Don Raye; Freddie Slack	4:28
Total length:			54:19

== Personnel ==
Asleep at the Wheel

- Ray Benson – vocals, lead guitar, production, mixing
- Cindy Cashdollar – steel guitar
- David Miller – bass, backing vocals
- David Sanger – drums
- Jason Roberts – fiddle, mandolin, backing vocals
- Chris Booher – fiddle
- Michael Francis – saxophone

Guest performers

- LeRoy Preston – vocals, rhythm guitar
- Chris O'Connell – vocals
- The McGuire Sisters – vocals
- Lucky Oceans – steel guitar
- Tony Garnier – bass
- Floyd Domino – piano
- Tim Alexander – piano, backing vocals
- Johnny Lee Carpenter – fiddle
- Tracy Byrd – vocals (tracks 2 and 4)
- Wade Hayes – vocals and lead guitar (track 4)

Production personnel

- Blake Chancey – production
- Larry Seyer – engineering, mixing
- Allen Crider – engineering
- David Gratz – engineering
- Frank Campbell – engineering
- Don Cobb – digital editing
- Carlos Grier – digital editing
- Denny Purcell – mastering
