= The Show, the After Party, the Hotel =

Studio album by Jodeci
- Released: July 18, 1995
- Recorded: October 1994–May 1995
- Studios: Dajhelon Studios, Rochester, New York
- Genre: R&B
- Length: 68:45
- Labels: Uptown; MCA
- Producers: Dalvin DeGrate; DeVante Swing

Jodeci chronology
Diary of a Mad Band (1993)	The Show, the After Party, the Hotel (1995)	Back to the Future: The Very Best of Jodeci (2005)

Singles from The Show, the After Party, the Hotel
- 1. "Freek'n You" Released: May 30, 1995; 2. "Love U 4 Life" Released: October 31, 1995; 3. "Get On Up" Released: January 11, 1996

The Show, the After Party, the Hotel is the third studio album by American R&B group Jodeci. It was released on July 18, 1995, through Uptown Records and distributed by MCA Records. The album was recorded at Dajhelon Studios in Rochester, New York.

The album peaked at number two on the Billboard 200 chart and was the third album from the group to reach number one on the Top R&B Albums chart. By September 1995, it was certified Platinum by the RIAA.

== Critical and commercial reception ==
Professional ratings
Review scores
Source	Rating
AllMusic	3/5 stars
Entertainment Weekly	B
Los Angeles Times	3/4 stars
Muzik	3/5 stars
The Rolling Stone Album Guide	1/5 stars
Smash Hits	2/5 stars
The Village Voice	B−

Ron Wynn of AllMusic felt the album itself was poorly edited and sequenced, and though he was critical of the group's overindulgent tendencies and refusal to emphasize radio hits, still stated the album had enough good moments "to make it worthwhile for most urban contemporary listeners." Dimitri Ehrlich of Entertainment Weekly gave note to the group's vocal harmonies and the album's production but felt the work lacked mature lyrics, taking away from Jodeci's authenticity.

The album was certified Platinum by September 1995.

== Track listing ==
Unless otherwise noted, Information is based on the album's liner notes.

No.	Title	Writer(s)	Producer	Length
1.	"The Show"	Donald "DeVante Swing" DeGrate	DeVante Swing Timbaland	1:24
2.	"Bring On da' Funk"	DeVante Swing; Dalvin "Mr. Dalvin" DeGrate; Cedric "K-Ci" Hailey; Timothy "Timbaland" Mosley	DeVante Swing; Mr. Dalvin	3:56
3.	"Room 723"	DeVante Swing	DeVante Swing	1:06
4.	"Fun 2 Nite"	Mr. Dalvin; K-Ci	Mr. Dalvin; Stevie J	3:52
5.	"Room 577"	DeVante Swing	DeVante Swing	1:12
6.	"S-More"	DeVante Swing; Mr. Dalvin; K-Ci; Missy Elliott; Al Green	Mr. Dalvin; Stevie J	3:42
7.	"The After-Party"	DeVante Swing	DeVante Swing	0:16
8.	"Get On Up"	Mr. Dalvin; K-Ci; Joel "JoJo" Hailey; Ivan Lins; Vítor Martins	Mr. Dalvin	3:47
9.	"Room 499"	DeVante Swing	DeVante Swing	1:05
10.	"Can We Flo?"	DeVante Swing	DeVante Swing	4:17
11.	"Zipper"	DeVante Swing	DeVante Swing	1:26
12.	"Let's Do It All"	DeVante Swing	DeVante Swing	5:51
13.	"P.I.B. 4 Play"	DeVante Swing	DeVante Swing	1:30
14.	"Pump It Back"	DeVante Swing	DeVante Swing	6:23
15.	"D.J. Don Jeremy"	DeVante Swing	DeVante Swing	1:37
16.	"Freek'n You"	DeVante Swing	DeVante Swing	6:19
17.	"Room 454: DeVante's Inhermission"	DeVante Swing	DeVante Swing	2:11
18.	"Time & Place"	DeVante Swing; Timbaland	DeVante Swing	6:00
19.	"Fallin'"	DeVante Swing	DeVante Swing	2:00
20.	"Love U 4 Life"	DeVante Swing	DeVante Swing	4:50
21.	"4U"	DeVante Swing	DeVante Swing	1:13
22.	"Good Luv"	DeVante Swing	DeVante Swing	4:48

Sample Credits

- "Bring On da' Funk"
  - "Funkin' for Jamaica (N.Y.)" performed by Tom Browne.
- "S-More"
  - "I’m Glad You’re Mine" performed by Al Green. Courtesy of Hi Records.
- "Get On Up"
  - "Velas" performed by Quincy Jones & Toots Thielemans. Courtesy of A&M Records.

== Charts ==
=== Weekly charts ===
Chart (1995)	Peak position
UK Albums (Official Charts)	4
UK R&B Albums (Official Charts)	1
US Billboard 200	2
US Top R&B/Hip-Hop Albums (Billboard)	1
Zimbabwean Albums (ZIMA)	4

=== Year-end charts ===
Chart (1995)	Position
US Billboard 200	74
US Top R&B Albums (Billboard)	11

Chart (1996)	Position
US Billboard 200	191
US Top R&B/Hip-Hop Albums (Billboard)	55

== Certifications ==
Region	Certification	Certified units/sales
United States (RIAA)	Platinum	1,000,000^{^}
^{^} Shipments figures based on certification alone.

== Personnel ==
Information taken from the album's Liner Notes and Allmusic.

- All Vocal Arrangements: DeVante Swing (2, 10, 12–14, 16, 18–22)
- Lead Vocals: Mr. Dalvin (4, 10), K-Ci (4, 6, 8, 10, 12, 16, 18–20, 22), JoJo (4, 8, 10, 12, 16, 18–20, 22), DeVante Swing (10, 12, 16, 18–19, 21)
- Background Vocals: Jodeci (2, 4, 6, 8, 10, 12, 14, 16, 18–22), DeVante Swing (1, 3, 5, 7, 9, 11, 13, 15, 17), Missy Elliott (additional on 2), Timbaland (additional on 2), Playa (additional on 10), Rolita ("Vocal Oohs" on 14)
- Musical Arrangements: Mr. Dalvin (4, 6, 8), Missy Elliott (additional on 6)
- All Instruments: Devante Swing (1, 3, 5, 7, 9-13, 15, 17, 19, 21–22)
- Additional Instruments: Devante Swing (2, 14, 16, 18, 20), Mr. Dalvin (4), Steven "Stevie J" Jordan (4, 6), Darryl Pearson (8)
- Guitar: Devante Swing (16, 20), Darryl Pearson (additional on 16, 20)
- Acoustic Guitar: Devante Swing (22)
- Bass: Mr. Dalvin (4), Devante Swing (18), Cliff Coleson (14), Derek "Duff" DeGrate (additional on 4), Darryl Pearson (additional on 18)
- Additional Voices: Tim Leverett (1-News Reporter)
- Art Direction: Robert Reives
- Artwork & Design: Tim Leverett
- Executive Producer: Andre Harrell, Suge Knight
- Production Coordinator: Debra Young
- Recording Engineer: Jimmy Douglass (4, 6, 8), Gerhard P. Joost II (1-3, 5–7, 9-22), DeVante Swing (1, 3, 5–7, 9, 11, 13, 15, 17, 19, 21), Steve Young (additional on 2), Mikael Ifversen (additional album sequencing), Steve Sola (additional album sequencing)
- Audio Mixing: Jimmy Douglass (4, 6, 8), Gerhard P. Joost II (1-3, 5–7, 9-22), DeVante Swing (1-3, 5–7, 9-22)
- Mastering: Roger Talkov

== See also ==
- List of number-one R&B albums of 1995 (U.S.)
