= Freek'n You =

Single by Jodeci

from the album The Show, the After Party, the Hotel
- Released: June 30, 1995
- Recorded: November 1994
- Studio: Dajhelon Studios, Rochester, New York
- Genre: R&B
- Length: 6:19 (album version); 4:19 (radio version)
- Label: Uptown; MCA
- Songwriter: DeVante Swing
- Producer: DeVante Swing

Jodeci singles chronology
| "What About Us" (1994) | "Freek'n You" (1995) | "Love U 4 Life" (1995) |

Music video
- "Freek'n You" on YouTube

"Freek'n You" is a song by American R&B group Jodeci recorded for their third album, The Show, the After Party, the Hotel (1995). It was released as the album's first single in June 1995, by Uptown and MCA Records. The song was both written and produced by DeVante Swing, and peaked at numbers 14 and 17 on the US Billboard Hot 100 and Cash Box Top 100 charts. Listed by Billboard magazine as one of the best selling singles of 1995, it was certified gold by the RIAA for sales in excess of 500,000 units.

The official remix, produced by Mr. Dalvin, features Raekwon and Ghostface Killah. They performed the remix version live with Jodeci (minus DeVante Swing) during the 200th episode of Showtime at the Apollo in February 1996. It features three models in the video: Veronica Webb, Beverly Peele, and Kara Young.

== Critical reception ==
Steve Baltin from Cash Box wrote, "A slow and grinding tune, the first single from Jodeci's forthcoming The Show, the After-Party, the Hotel is a guaranteed hit, given the group's past success (lead singer K-Ci Hailey currently has a song on the charts) and the song's play it safe attitude." Mark Sutherland from Smash Hits gave it two out of five, viewing it as "smooth-but-tune-free slabs of R&B".

== Track listing ==
- Vinyl, 12"
1. "Freek'n You" (Part 1) – 5:16
2. "Freek'n You" (Funky Freeky Mix) – 4:19
3. "Freek'n You" (Radio Edit) – 4:19
4. "Freek'n You" (P.J.B. 4 Play) – 1:23
5. "Freek'n You" (Freekstrumental Mix) – 4:01
6. "Freek'n You" (Freek-A-Pella Mix) – 5:09
- CD, maxi-single
1. "Freek'n You" (Part 1) – 5:16
2. "Freek'n You" (Funky Freeky Mix) – 4:19
3. "Freek'n You" (Radio Edit) – 4:19
4. "Freek'n You" (P.J.B. 4 Play) – 1:23
5. "Freek'n You" (Freekoustical Mix) – 5:17
6. "Freek'n You" (Freekstrumental Mix) – 4:01
7. "Freek'n You" (Freek-A-Pella Mix) – 5:09

== Personnel ==
Information taken from the album's liner notes.

- Cedric "K-Ci" Hailey – lead and background vocals
- Joel "JoJo" Hailey – lead and background vocals
- Mr. Dalvin – background vocals
- DeVante Swing – lead vocals, background vocals, guitar, other instruments
- Darryl Pearson – additional guitar
- DeVante Swing (a.k.a. DeVanté 4HISDAMNSELF ENT.) – production & all vocal arrangements
- Andre Harrell – executive producer

== Charts and certifications ==
=== Weekly charts ===
| Chart (1995) | Peak position |
|---|---|
| Australia (ARIA) | 23 |
| Netherlands (Single Top 100) | 42 |
| UK Singles (Official Charts) | 17 |
| US Billboard Hot 100 | 14 |
| US Dance Club Songs (Billboard) | 14 |
| US Hot R&B/Hip-Hop Songs (Billboard) | 3 |
| US Maxi-Singles Sales (Billboard) | 4 |
| US Rhythmic Airplay (Billboard) | 21 |
| US Cash Box Top 100 | 17 |
| Zimbabwe (ZIMA) | 4 |

=== Year-end charts ===
| Chart (1995) | Position |
|---|---|
| US Billboard Hot 100 | 57 |
| US Hot R&B/Hip-Hop Songs (Billboard) | 19 |

=== Certifications ===
| Region | Certification | Certified units/sales |
|---|---|---|
| United States (RIAA) | Gold | 600,000 |

== Covers and sampling ==
- The song was remixed by UK garage act Club Asylum in 1998, titled "Freek Me Up". It reached No. 92 on the UK Singles Chart.
- DJ Funk remixed the song in the ghetto house style as "Every Freakin Day" on the 1999 mixtape "Booty House Anthems."
- The song was sampled in 2015 by British duo Tough Love on their debut single "So Freakin' Tight" as well as Future and Mila J's song "FreakNic".
- In 2017, PartyNextDoor released his EP Colours 2, featuring "Freak in You" which interpolates the song, as well as "Come and Talk to Me" from Jodeci. Drake would go on to remix PartyNextDoor's "Freak in You" as well.
- In 2019, the song was sampled by DJ Khaled in "Freak N You" featuring Lil Wayne and Gunna.
- Covers of the song have been performed live by R&B singers including Trey Songz, Ne-Yo and Anthony Hamilton.

== In other media ==
- The Notorious B.I.G. can be seen singing the beginning of the first verse in a video clip from 1996. The clip is shown in the beginning of the video for "Nasty Girl", a posthumous single released in 2005 from the album Duets: The Final Chapter.
- The song was featured in the 2008 video game Grand Theft Auto IV, appearing on the R&B radio station The Vibe 98.8.
- The song is also featured on the official soundtrack for the 2015 film Magic Mike XXL.
- In a 2015 episode of Black-ish, the song was played.
- In 2018, the song was used as the first ending theme song for the Golden Wind arc of the JoJo's Bizarre Adventure anime series.
