= Love U 4 Life =

Single by Jodeci

from the album The Show, the After Party, the Hotel
- Released: October 31, 1995
- Genre: R&B
- Length: 4:50
- Label: Uptown/MCA
- Songwriter: DeVante Swing
- Producer: DeVante Swing

Jodeci singles chronology
"Freek'n You" (1995)	"Love U 4 Life" (1995)	"Get On Up" (1996)

"Love U 4 Life" is a song by American R&B group Jodeci, recorded for their third album, The Show, the After Party, the Hotel (1995). The song is both written and produced by DeVante Swing, and was released by Uptown/MCA as the second single for the album on Halloween 1995. It peaked at numbers 18 and 31 on the US Cash Box Top 100 and Billboard Hot 100 charts.

== Critical reception ==
Gil L. Robertson IV from Cash Box complimented the song, writing, "Another winner from Jodeci! This track is filled with smooth, powerful vocals that will make it a winner on the radio airwaves across the board. As usual, the group's harmonizing is in order and the production is crisp and supports the group well."

== Track listing ==
- Vinyl, 12"
1. "Love U 4 Life" (LP Version) - 5:07
2. "Freek'n You" (Raekwon Remix) - 5:07
  (feat. Raekwon)
3. "Love U 4 Life" (Main Pass Remix) - 4:03

== Personnel ==
Information taken from Discogs.

- Cedric "K-Ci" Hailey - Lead and Background vocals
- Joel "JoJo" Hailey - Lead and Background vocals
- DeVante Swing - Background vocals, Guitar, Other instruments
- Mr. Dalvin - Background vocals
- Darryl Pearson - Additional Guitar
- Production & All Vocal Arrangements: DeVante Swing (aka DeVanté 4HISDAMNSELF ENT.)
- Remixing: Mr. Dalvin (Remixes only)

== Charts ==
Chart (1995–1996)	Peak position
Australia (ARIA)	119
US Billboard Hot 100	31
US Hot Dance Music/Maxi-Singles Sales (Billboard)	15
US Hot R&B/Hip-Hop Singles & Tracks (Billboard)	8
US Rhythmic Top 40 (Billboard)	22
US Cash Box Top 100	18
