= Cry for You (Jodeci song) =

Single by Jodeci

from the album Diary of a Mad Band
- Released: November 23, 1993
- Recorded: 1993
- Genre: R&B; soul
- Length: 5:01
- Label: Uptown/MCA
- Songwriter: Donald DeGrate, Jr.
- Producer: DeVante Swing

Jodeci singles chronology
"Lately" (1993)	"Cry for You" (1993)	"Feenin'" (1994)

Music video
- "Cry for You" on YouTube

"Cry for You" is a song by American R&B group Jodeci recorded for their second album, Diary of a Mad Band (1993). The song was released as the album's lead single in November 1993 by Uptown/MCA. It peaked at numbers fifteen and nineteen on the US Billboard Hot 100 and Cash Box Top 100. The song also spent four weeks at number one on the Billboard R&B/Hip-Hop songs chart (the last of five Jodeci songs to hit number one on that chart), and number one on the Billboard Mainstream R&B/Hip-Hop airplay chart. It was certified Gold by the Recording Industry Association of America for sales in excess of 500,000 units.

== Critical reception ==
Alan Jones from Music Week gave the song three out of five, writing, "An excellent dead slow, soul drenched ballad in much the same style as that purveyed by Boyz II Men. So slow, even in remixes, that club support is minimal, but specialist radio will love it." John Mulvey from NME commented, "So Jodeci come all over all sultry and lonesome, look like rejects from the Dogg Pound and sound about as mean as Luther Vandross."

== Track listings ==
- US promo CD single
1. "Cry for You" (Extended Version) - 4:58
2. "Cry for You" (Radio Version) - 4:27
3. "Cry for You" (Instrumental) - 4:27
4. "Cry for You" (Acapella) - 4:58
- US promo Vinyl and 12"
1. "Cry for You" (Radio Version) - 4:27
2. "Cry for You" (Extended Version) - 4:27
3. "Cry for You" (Acapella) - 4:28

== Personnel ==
Information taken from Discogs.

- Co-Executive Producer: Buttnaked Tim Dawg
- Executive Producer: Andre Harrell
- Instruments: DeVante Swing
- Lyrics: DeVante Swing
- Producer: DeVante Swing
- Cedric "K-Ci" Hailey - Lead and Background vocals
- Joel "JoJo" Hailey - Lead and Background vocals
- DeVante Swing - Background vocals
- Mr. Dalvin - Background vocals

== Charts ==
=== Weekly charts ===
Chart (1993–1994)	Peak position
Australia (ARIA)	199
UK Singles (OCC)	20
UK Dance (Music Week)	14
US Billboard Hot 100	15
US Hot R&B/Hip-Hop Songs (Billboard)	1
US Rhythmic Airplay (Billboard)	5
US Cash Box Top 100	19

=== Year-end charts ===
Chart (1994)	Position
US Billboard Hot 100	60
US Hot R&B/Hip-Hop Songs (Billboard)	5

== Certifications ==
Region	Certification	Certified units/sales
United States (RIAA)	Gold	500,000^{^}
^{^} Shipments figures based on certification alone.

== Cover and sample versions ==
The song was later sampled by hip hop artist Bun B for his 2008 single "You're Everything."

The song was covered by J Valentine, Tank, Bobby Cash, & T. Nelson under the title "Cry 4 U". The song is available on the J Valentine mixtape "Love & Other Drugs".

The Isley Brothers interpolated the song on the cover version of the track "Warm Summer Night" from the 2001 album, Eternal.

Drake mentions the song in the chorus of his 2016 single, "Controlla".

Gerald Levert re-sung the song on the track "Hang in There" from his 2007 posthumous album, In My Songs.

Diddy references the song and the group on his 2010 single Hello Good Morning with the line "Your baby momma cry for me like Jodeci".

Justin Timberlake, Ryan Gosling, J.C. Chasez & Dale Godboldo performed the song on an episode of Mickey Mouse Club.

== See also ==
- List of number-one R&B singles of 1994 (U.S.)
