= I'm Still Waiting (Jodeci song) =

Single by Jodeci

from the album Forever My Lady
- Released: August 25, 1992
- Genre: R&B; soul
- Length: 4:21
- Label: Uptown/MCA
- Songwriter: DeVante Swing
- Producers: DeVante Swing, Al B. Sure!

Jodeci singles chronology
"Come and Talk to Me" (1992)	"I'm Still Waiting" (1992)	"Let's Go Through the Motions" (1993)

"I'm Still Waiting" is a song by American R&B group Jodeci from their debut album, Forever My Lady (1991). The song was the fifth and last single released in August 1992 by Uptown/MCA in promotion for the album. It peaked at numbers 81 and 85 on the US Cash Box Top 100 and Billboard Hot 100 charts. The "Swing Hip Hop Mix" (or "Swing Mob Radio Mix") version is the version of the song used in the music video instead of the album version.

== Track listings ==
=== 12", 33 1/3 RPM, CD, vinyl ===
1. "I'm Still Waiting" (Album Version) - 4:21
2. "I'm Still Waiting" (Jazz Version) - 4:58
3. "I'm Still Waiting" (Instrumental) - 4:50

=== Cassette, CD, 12" LP vinyl ===
1. "I'm Still Waiting" (Swing Mob Radio Mix) - 4:15
2. "I'm Still Waiting" (Swing Hip Hop Mix) - 4:28
3. "I'm Still Waiting" (Daddy's Jeep Mix) - 5:58
4. "I'm Still Waiting" (Daddy Hip Hop) - 6:00
5. "I'm Still Waiting" (Mr. Dalvin Raps) - 5:15

=== Personnel ===
- K-Ci Hailey - Lead and Background vocals
- Jojo Hailey - Background vocals
- DeVante Swing - Background vocals, Instruments
- Mr. Dalvin - Background vocals

== Charts ==
Chart (1992)	Peak position
US Billboard Hot 100	85
US Hot R&B/Hip-Hop Singles & Tracks (Billboard)	10
US Cash Box Top 100	81
