= Dr. Dre: The Biography =

2007 book by Ronin Ro

- Author: Ronin Ro
- Language: English
- Subject: Biography
- Genre: Non-fiction
- Published: 2/28/2007
- Publication place: United States
- Media type: Print (Hardcover)
- Pages: 308
- ISBN: 9781560259213

Dr. Dre: The Biography is a biography written about American rapper, music producer, and entrepreneur Dr. Dre written by Ronin Ro released February 28, 2007.

== Subject matter ==
Dr. Dre: The Biography covers the early days of Dr. Dre's career and his time with the World Class Wreckin' Cru, N.W.A, and Ruthless, the release of The Chronic and his time at Death Row, and the formation of his record label Aftermath, and the production work with artists such as Eminem, Snoop Dogg, 50 Cent, The Game, etc., to present.

== Accolades and reviews ==
Mike Tribby, writing for Booklist, wrote a positive review for Dr. Dre: The Biography and also said it is "probably one of the 10 best books on rap". Writing for All Hip Hop, Sidik Fofana also wrote a positive review for Dr. Dre: The Biography and said "Dr. Dre: The Biography stands as a momentous document for one of the great careers in the Hip Hop spectrum".
