= Stay (Jodeci song) =

1991 song by American group Jodeci

Single by Jodeci

from the album Forever My Lady
- Released: December 3, 1991
- Genre: New jack swing
- Length: 5:11
- Label: Uptown/MCA
- Songwriter: DeVante Swing
- Producers: DeVante Swing, Al B. Sure!

Jodeci singles chronology
"Forever My Lady" (1991)	"Stay" (1991)	"Come and Talk to Me" (1992)

"Stay" is a song by American group Jodeci from their debut album Forever My Lady (1991). The song was the third single released in promotion for the album in December 1991. Written and co-produced by DeVante Swing, "Stay" became the group's second number one R&B hit, spending two weeks at number-one on the US Billboard R&B chart, and peaked at numbers 41 and 86 on the Billboard Hot 100 and Cash Box Top 100 charts.

== Track listing ==
- 12", cassette, maxi-single, vinyl
1. "Stay" (Radio Version) - 4:05
2. "Stay" (Instrumental) - 6:09
3. "Stay" (Album Version) - 5:11
4. "Stay" (Swing Bass) - 6:07
5. "Stay" (Swing Drums) - 6:09
6. "Stay" (Accapella) - 6:08

== Personnel ==
- Production: Al B. Sure!, DeVante Swing.
- JoJo Hailey - Lead and Background vocals
- K-Ci Hailey - Lead and Background vocals
- DeVante Swing - Background vocals, Instruments
- Mr. Dalvin - Background vocals

== Charts ==
=== Weekly charts ===
Chart (1991–1992)	Peak position
US Billboard Hot 100	41
US Hot R&B/Hip-Hop Songs (Billboard)	1
US Cash Box Top 100	86

=== Year-end charts ===
Chart (1992)	Position
US Hot R&B/Hip-Hop Songs (Billboard)	10

== See also ==
- List of number-one R&B singles of 1992 (U.S.)

== June's Diary version ==
"Stay"

Single by June's Diary

from the album Male Edition
- Released: March 20, 2017
- Recorded: 2017
- Genre: R&B
- Length: 5:04
- Label: HSJW Music Group
- Songwriter: DeVante Swing

June's Diary singles chronology
"L.A.N.C.E." (2016)	"Stay" (2017)

"Stay" is a song performed by American recording R&B group June's Diary. It was released as the lead single on March 20, 2017, from their debut mixtape "Male Edition" (2017).

=== Critical reception ===
The song was met with positive responses from critics. Vibe magazine praised their version of the song stating "The Chasing Destiny stars take a trip back to the ’90s in their latest video for their spin on Jodeci’s “Stay.” Duly dressed for the ode to the iconic R&B group, Kelly Rowland’s protégées remind us why they earned their mentor’s stamp of approval as they nail the classic tune from Forever My Lady." Rap-Up gave their approval stating the group "put their soulful spin on another R&B group, Jodeci, and their classic Stay".

=== Music video ===
A music video was released to June's Diary's YouTube channel on March 16, 2017. A behind the scene's video of the music video was released a day later.

=== Formats and track listings ===
Digital download – Album

1. "Stay" – 5:04

=== Release history ===
Country	Date	Format	Label	Ref.
United States	March 20, 2017	Digital download	HSJW Music Group	
United Kingdom	March 20, 2017	Digital download	HSJW Music Group	
