= Come and Talk to Me =

Single by Jodeci

from the album Forever My Lady
- Released: March 10, 1992
- Recorded: 1991
- Genre: R&B
- Length: 4:36
- Label: Uptown/MCA
- Songwriters: DeVante Swing, Al B. Sure!
- Producers: DeVante Swing, Al B. Sure!

Jodeci singles chronology
"Stay" (1991)	"Come and Talk to Me" (1992)	"I'm Still Waiting" (1992)

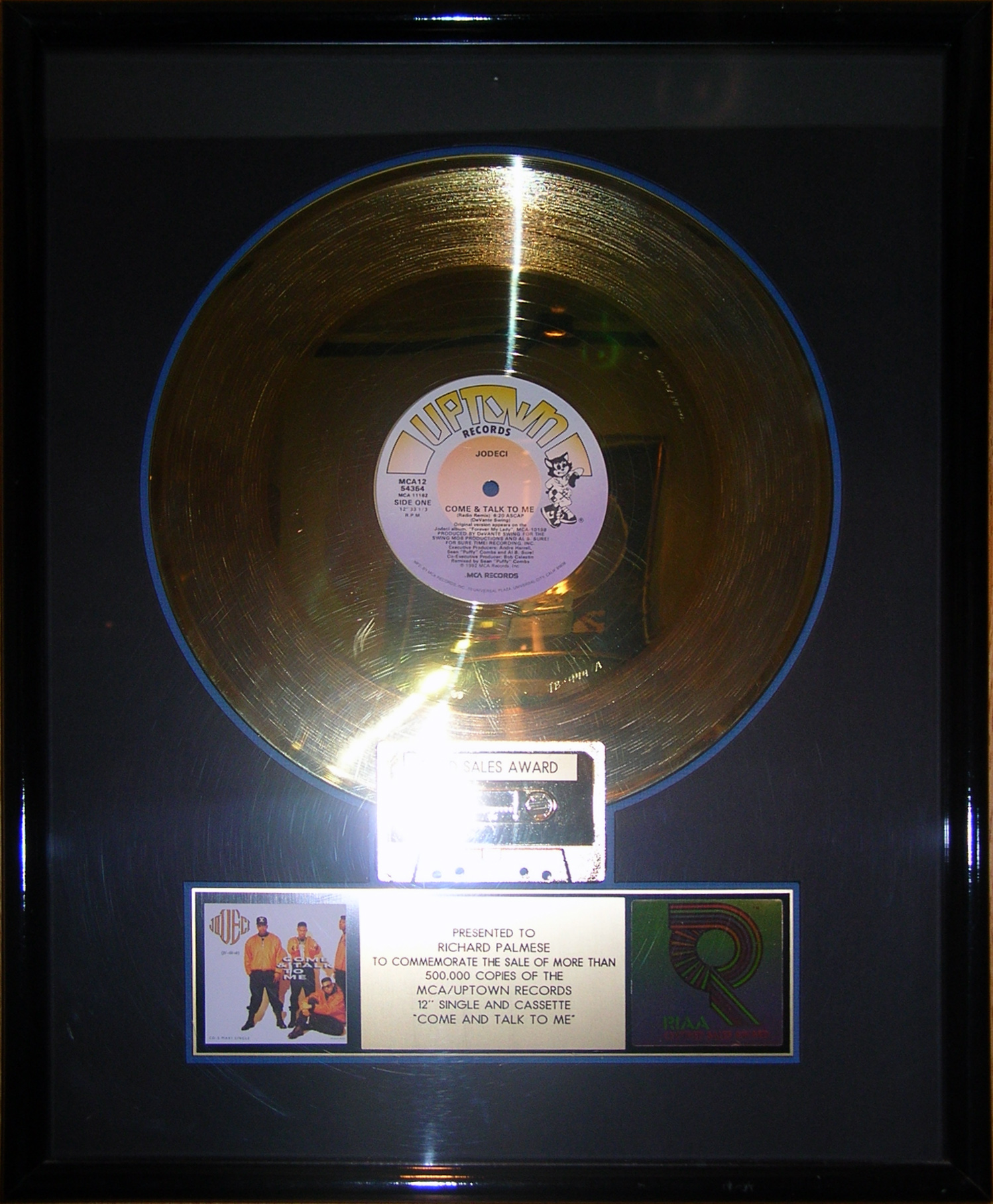
"Come & Talk to Me" Gold Record at Hard Rock Cafe in Hollywood.

"Come and Talk to Me" is a song by American R&B group Jodeci from their debut album, Forever My Lady (1991). The song was released on March 10, 1992 by Uptown/MCA, as the fourth single from the album. As the third number-one R&B hit for Jodeci, "Come and Talk to Me" spent two weeks at the number-one spot on the US Billboard R&B chart, and peaked at numbers 9 and 11 on the Cash Box Top 100 and Billboard Hot 100 charts. The song also topped the R&B year-end chart for 1992.

The song was written, produced and arranged by Al B Sure and fellow Jodeci member DeVante Swing. The song features K-Ci as the lead singer, and JoJo, Mr. Dalvin and DeVante Swing on the chorus. The music video was first seen in the spring of 1992. There are 3 different edited versions of the music video. A 4th brand new music video was shot & released for the "Hip Hop Remix" (or Radio Remix) which was produced by Sean "Puffy" Combs. The "Hip Hop Remix" features a rap verse from Fat Doug, but he doesn't appear in the music video.

== Track listings ==
=== US promo ===
1. "Come & Talk to Me" (LP Edit) 4:02
2. "Come & Talk to Me" (Radio Remix) 6:20
3. "Come & Talk to Me" (Instrumental) 6:25
4. "Come & Talk to Me" (Hip Hop Remix) 6:20
5. "Come & Talk to Me" (Horny Mix) 5:30
6. "Come & Talk to Me" (Dance Mix) 5:30

=== US maxi-CD ===
1. "Come & Talk to Me" (Album Edit) 4:02
2. "Come & Talk to Me" (Radio Remix) 6:20
3. "Come & Talk to Me" (Hip Hop Remix) 6:20
4. "Come & Talk to Me" (Horny Mix) 5:30
5. "Gotta Love" (New R&B Edit) 4:19

=== Personnel ===
Written and produced by DeVante Swing

- Cedric "K-Ci" Hailey - Lead and Background vocals
- Joel "JoJo" Hailey - Background vocals
- DeVante Swing - Background vocals
- Mr. Dalvin - Background vocals

== Charts ==
=== Weekly charts ===
Chart (1992)	Peak position
US Billboard Hot 100	11
US Hot Dance Music/Maxi-Singles Sales (Billboard)	18
US Hot R&B/Hip-Hop Songs (Billboard)	1
US Rhythmic Airplay (Billboard)	7
US Cash Box Top 100	9

=== Year-end charts ===
Chart (1992)	Position
US Billboard Hot 100	31

== Certifications ==
Region	Certification	Certified units/sales
United States (RIAA)	Gold	500,000^{^}
^{^} Shipments figures based on certification alone.

== See also ==
- List of number-one R&B singles of 1992 (U.S.)
