= Father MC =

American rapper

Timothy Brown (born September 26, 1967), also known as Father MC, is an American rapper who achieved success in the early 1990s on the Uptown Records label.

== Personal life ==
Born on September 26, 1967 in Brooklyn, he grew up in Far Rockaway, Queens.

Father MC appeared in the August 1996 issue of Playgirl in a photospread taken by Greg Weiner.

== Discography ==
=== Albums ===
- Father's Day (1990)
- Close to You (1992)
- Sex Is Law (1993)
- This Is for the Players (1995)
- No Secrets (1999)
- Eat this Morning (2003)
- Fam Body (2010)

=== Songs ===
- "Treat Them Like They Want to Be Treated" (1990)
- "I'll Do 4 U" (1990) [US #20]
- "Lisa Baby" (1991)
- "I've Been Watching You" (1991)
- "One Nite Stand" (1992) [US #111]
- "Everything's Gonna Be Alright" (1992) [US #37]
- "Innocent Girl"(1993) (ft. 4 Sure) [US #102]
- "Ï Beeped You" (1994)
- "Hey, How Ya Doin'" (1995)
- “Father’s Day” (Expanded edition) (2024)
