= Forever My Lady (song) =

Single by Jodeci

from the album Forever My Lady
- Released: August 13, 1991
- Genre: R&B, soul
- Length: 5:20
- Label: Uptown/MCA
- Songwriters: DeVante Swing, Al B. Sure!
- Producers: DeVante Swing, Al B. Sure!

Jodeci singles chronology
"Gotta Love" (1991)	"Forever My Lady" (1991)	"Stay" (1991)

"Forever My Lady" is a song by American R&B group Jodeci from their debut album of the same name (1991). The song was the second single released in promotion for the album in August 1991. "Forever My Lady" was the first of five number one R&B hits for the group, spending two weeks at number one on the US R&B chart, and also peaked at numbers 25 and 66 on the Billboard Hot 100 and Cash Box Top 100 charts. It was written and produced by member DeVante Swing and singer/producer Al B. Sure!. The song was dedicated to Al B. Sure!'s then girlfriend Kim Porter, as well as their newborn son Quincy.

== Track listing ==
- 12"
1. "Forever My Lady" (Radio Edit) - 4:20
2. "Forever My Lady" (Funky Version)
3. "Gotta Love" (Hip Hop)

== Personnel ==
Information taken from Discogs.

- production: Al B. Sure!, DeVante Swing
- remixing: DeVante Swing
- writing: Al B. Sure!, DeVante Swing, K-Ci
- K-Ci Hailey - Lead and Background vocals
- JoJo Hailey - Lead and Background vocals
- DeVante Swing - Background vocals
- Mr. Dalvin - Background vocals

== Charts ==
Chart (1991–1992)	Peak position
US Billboard Hot 100	25
US Hot R&B/Hip-Hop Singles & Tracks	1
US Cash Box Top 100	66

== See also ==
- List of number-one R&B singles of 1991 (U.S.)
