= Shawn Pen =

American rapper (born 1969)

- Also known as: Little Shawn, Lil' Shawn
- Born: Tyrone La Shon Wilkins; December 21, 1969 (age 56)
- Origin: East Flatbush, Brooklyn, New York City, New York, U.S.
- Genres: Hip hop
- Occupations: Rapper; producer; songwriter
- Years active: 1987–present
- Label: Capitol
- Website: twitter.com/iamshawnpen

Tyrone La Shon Wilkins (born December 21, 1969), better known as Little Shawn and Shawn Pen, is an American rapper, songwriter and producer from East Flatbush, Brooklyn.

He released a single in 1986 My girl Mother (Select Records) and an album called The Voice in the Mirror (Capitol Records) in 1992.

== Career ==
Lil Shawn released the single _Hickey on my chest"in 1992 for Capitol Records. The single sold 455,050 copies and peak #8 on Billboard singles chart. Lil Shawn come with another hit single called"Dom Perignon" (Uptown Records) featuring fellow Brooklyn rapper The Notorious B.I.G. on 20 July 1995. The music video also featured Busta Rhymes, another rapper from Brooklyn. It peaked at #5 on the Bubbling Under Hot 100 as well as #87 on the Hot R&B/Hip-Hop Singles and #23 on the Hot Rap Tracks charts. The song was featured on the soundtrack to the Fox TV crime drama New York Undercover.

Tupac Shakur was on his way to record a verse for Little Shawn when he was robbed and shot 5 times in 1994.

== Legal issues ==
From 1998 to 2003, Wilkins served time in federal prison for drug trafficking. Wilkins changed his stage name to Shawn Pen after leaving prison.

== Discography ==
=== Albums ===
Title	Album details
The Voice in the Mirror	Released: 16 March 1992; Label: Capitol; Format: CD, CS, LP

=== Singles ===
List of singles, with selected chart positions
Title	Year	Peak chart positions			Album
Title	Year	US	US R&B	US Rap	Album
"Hickeys on Your Chest".		–	–	8	The Voice in the Mirror
"I Made Love (4 Da Very 1st Time)"		–	71^{[A]}	28	The Voice in the Mirror
"Dom Perignon" (featuring The Notorious B.I.G.)	1995	105^{[B]}	87	14	New York Undercover
"Bout That Life" (featuring Malik Yusef and Styles P)	2013	–	–	–	

- A. Charted only on the Hot R&B/Hip-Hop Singles Sales chart.
- B. Charted only on the Bubbling Under Hot 100 chart.
