= Feenin' =

Single by Jodeci

from the album Diary of a Mad Band
- Released: March 8, 1994
- Recorded: 1993
- Genre: R&B
- Length: 5:10
- Label: Uptown/MCA
- Songwriter: DeVante Swing
- Producer: DeVante Swing

Jodeci singles chronology
"Cry for You" (1993)	"Feenin'" (1994)	"What About Us" (1994)

"Feenin'" is a song by American R&B group Jodeci, recorded for their second album, Diary of a Mad Band (1993). It was released as the second single from the album in March 1994, by Uptown and MCA Records. It was both written and produced by DeVante Swing, and peaked at numbers 25 and 78 on the US Billboard Hot 100 and Cash Box Top 100 charts, and number 18 on the UK Singles Chart. The accompanying music video for "Feenin'", filmed in a mental asylum, was directed by American director Hype Williams and featured cameo appearances by Williams himself, Snoop Doggy Dogg and Treach from Naughty by Nature.

== Critical reception ==
Andy Beevers from Music Week gave the song a score of four out of five, naming it a "mellow track". James Hamilton from the Record Mirror Dance Update called it a "strangely spelt whining slow US urban lurcher" in his weekly dance column.

== Track listing ==
- US promo Vinyl and 12"
1. "Feenin'" (Radio Version) - 4:14
2. "Feenin'" (E Double Gets Bizzy Mix) - 4:59
3. "Feenin'" (E Double Gets Bizz-e-r Mix) - 6:29
4. "Feenin'" (Get Bizzy Instrumental) - 4:06
5. "Feenin'" (Acapella) - 3:51

== Personnel ==
Information taken from Discogs.

- Producer: DeVante Swing
- Remixer: Erick Sermon
- Cedric "K-Ci" Hailey - Lead and Background vocals
- Joel "JoJo" Hailey - Lead and Background vocals
- DeVante Swing - Background vocals
- Mr. Dalvin - Background vocals

== Charts ==
=== Weekly charts ===
Chart (1994)	Peak position
UK Singles (OCC)	18
UK Dance (OCC)	1
UK Dance (Music Week)	1
UK Club Chart (Music Week)	2
US Billboard Hot 100	25
US Hot R&B/Hip-Hop Songs (Billboard)	2
US Rhythmic Airplay (Billboard)	16
US Cash Box Top 100	78

=== Year-end charts ===
Chart (1994)	Position
US Hot R&B/Hip-Hop Songs (Billboard)	25
