= Forever My Lady =

Studio album by Jodeci
- Released: May 28, 1991
- Recorded: 1990–1991
- Genre: R&B
- Length: 53:23
- Labels: Uptown; MCA
- Producers: Donald "DeVante Swing" DeGrate (exec.); Albert "Al B. Sure!" Brown (also exec.)

Jodeci chronology
Forever My Lady (1991)	Diary of a Mad Band (1993)

Singles from Forever My Lady
- 1. "Gotta Love" Released: February 24, 1991; 2. "Forever My Lady" Released: August 13, 1991; 3. "Stay" Released: December 3, 1991; 4. "Come and Talk to Me" Released: March 10, 1992; 5. "I'm Still Waiting" Released: August 25, 1992

Forever My Lady is the debut studio album by American R&B group Jodeci, released on May 28, 1991, through Uptown Records and MCA Records.

== Background ==
The album's production and composition was largely attributed to DeVante Swing, who worked alongside Grammy-nominated producer Al B. Sure! to craft the album's sound. The recording sessions took place at various recording studios during 1990 to 1991, and were relentlessly worked upon in order to shift the consensus with R&B music. The duo worked to add more of a hip-hop sound to the album, incorporating synthesizer-heavy rhythm tracks to complement the alternating themes discussed throughout the album, ranging from passionate and elegant songs about love, to energetic and swaggering songs centered around sex and partying. The group's emotionally transparent lyrics are delivered in both rapped and sung verses, help to explore the feelings of love and seduction.

== Critical and commercial reception ==
The album received overwhelmingly positive reviews from critics, who complimented the group's innovative nature when approaching the album, as well as its thematic choices and the production from Swing. Following an anticipated release, it debuted at number one on the Billboard Top R&B Albums chart in its first week, and peaked at eighteen on the Billboard 200. Three of the album's singles charted on the Billboard Hot 100, including the top-15 hit "Come and Talk to Me". Forever My Lady was certified multi-platinum by the Recording Industry Association of America and, as of August 1995, has sold over three million copies in the US and over eight million copies worldwide.

Professional ratings
Review scores
Source	Rating
AllMusic	5/5 stars
Entertainment Weekly	A−
Los Angeles Times	2.5/4 stars

Arion Berger of Entertainment Weekly gave the effort a good review, calling the work "sophisticated beyond the band members' years" and noting that "if they can keep up the momentum of this commercially successful debut (which has already gone Top 40 on the Billboard pop album chart), Jodeci will be a force to be reckoned with." Los Angeles Times critic Dennis Hunt was less impressed, writing that "the singing is so-so but the production is outstanding."

== Legacy ==
In 1993, Akinyele's song I Luh Hur from his album Vagina Diner mentioned "Forever My Lady".

In support of the album's 35th anniversary, the group released Forever My Lady (35th Anniversary Edition), featuring 5 bonus tracks, on vinyl and CD in July 2026. The group will also embark on a tour in 2026.

== Track listing ==
All tracks are produced by DeVante Swing, except where noted.

No.	Title	Writer(s)	Producer(s)	Length
1.	"Stay"	Donald Earle DeGrate Jr.	DeVante Swing; Al B. Sure!	5:11
2.	"Come and Talk to Me"	DeGrate; Albert Joseph Brown III	DeVante Swing; Al B. Sure!	4:36
3.	"Forever My Lady"	DeGrate; Brown	DeVante Swing; Al B. Sure!	5:20
4.	"I'm Still Waiting"	DeGrate	DeVante Swing; Al B. Sure!	4:21
5.	"U&I"	DeGrate	DeVante Swing; Al B. Sure!	4:04
6.	"Interlude (553-Nasty)"	DeGrate	DeVante Swing	1:47
7.	"My Phone"	DeGrate	DeVante Swing; Al B. Sure!	5:49
8.	"Gotta Love"	DeGrate; Cedric Renard Hailey	DeVante Swing	4:43
9.	"Play Thang"	DeGrate	DeVante Swing	4:45
10.	"It's Alright"	DeGrate	DeVante Swing	4:36
11.	"Treat U"	DeGrate	DeVante Swing	3:42
12.	"Xs We Share"	DeGrate	DeVante Swing	4:29
13.	"Cherish" (bonus track, originally from the Fried Green Tomatoes soundtrack)	Terry Kirkman	DeVante Swing	3:59

== Personnel ==
- Art Direction – Reiner Design Consultants
- Assistant Engineering – Ellen Fitton, Michael Gilbert, Marnie Riley, Jay A. Ryan
- Engineering – Paul Logus, Dennis Mitchell, Mark Partis
- Mastering – Herb Powers
- Writer - Al B. Sure!
- Mixing – Al B. Sure!, Mick Guzauski
- Multi-Instruments – DeVante Swing
- Production Coordination – Eloise Bryan
- Programming – Al B. Sure!, Dalvin DeGrate, DeVante Swing

== Charts ==
=== Weekly charts ===
Chart (1991–92)	Peak position
Australian Albums (ARIA)	163
US Billboard 200	18
US Heatseekers Albums (Billboard)	1
US Top R&B/Hip-Hop Albums (Billboard)	1

=== Year-end charts ===
Chart (1991)	Position
US Top R&B/Hip-Hop Albums (Billboard)	50
Chart (1992)	Position
US Billboard 200	26
US Top R&B/Hip-Hop Albums (Billboard)	1
Chart (1993)	Position
US Top R&B/Hip-Hop Albums (Billboard)	96

== Certifications ==
Region	Certification	Certified units/sales
United States (RIAA)	3× Platinum	3,000,000^{^}
^{^} Shipments figures based on certification alone.

== See also ==
- List of number-one R&B albums of 1991 (U.S.)
- Billboard Year-End
