= Jodeci =

American R&B quartet

- Also known as: The Bad Boys of R&B
- Origin: Charlotte, North Carolina, U.S.
- Genres: R&B; hip hop soul; new jack swing
- Works: Jodeci discography
- Years active: 1988–present
- Labels: Sphinx; Epic; Uptown; MCA
- Spinoffs: K-Ci & JoJo; Swing Mob
- Members: Joel "JoJo" Hailey; Donald "DeVante" DeGrate; Cedric "K-Ci" Hailey; Dalvin "Mr. Dalvin" DeGrate
- Website: jodeci.com

Jodeci (/ˈdʒoʊdəsi/ JOH-də-see) is an American R&B quartet consisting of members JoJo, DeVanté Swing, K-Ci, and Mr. Dalvin. Formed in 1988 in Charlotte, North Carolina, Jodeci began as a duo of DeVanté Swing and JoJo but later both added their brothers. After signing with Uptown Records in 1990, the group finished work on their debut album, Forever My Lady (1991), which brought them mainstream success with three straight Billboard R&B No. 1 hit singles: the album's titular track, "Stay" and "Come and Talk to Me".

The group's critical and commercial success continued with the releases of Diary of a Mad Band (1993), which includes the Billboard hit singles "Cry for You" and "Feenin'", and The Show, the After Party, the Hotel (1995), which includes the additional Billboard hit singles "Freek'n You", "Love U 4 Life", and "Get On Up". The group experimented with various musical styles typically not associated with traditional R&B. Jodeci would incorporate hip hop soul, gospel and new jack swing into their music, which led to the group featuring prominently with hip hop artists during the 1990s. Each album released by the group during this period attained platinum certification by the Recording Industry Association of America (RIAA), and helped to redefine the genre, allowing for developments in thematic and musical content within R&B.

In 1996, they announced a hiatus – though continuing to work on music as a group – which prompted K-Ci & JoJo to branch off as a duo, releasing five albums until 2013, when the group re-united for their fourth studio album, The Past, the Present, the Future (2015). Jodeci has sold more than 20 million records worldwide to date. Complex magazine ranked the group 1st on their "1990s Male R&B Group Pyramid of Excellence" list in 2014, one of the most influential groups of the 1990s, and the best R&B group of all time.

== History ==
=== 1983–1991: Early beginnings and formation ===
Raised in an extremely religious Pentecostal family, brothers K-Ci and JoJo – then known as Little Cedric & the Hailey Singers – originally performed and recorded as a gospel group, releasing three albums: Jesus Saves, I'm Alright Now, and God's Blessings. K-Ci would later draw comparisons to Michael Jackson during his gospel career. Separately, Mr. Dalvin and DeVanté Swing performed and toured in their own family's gospel group called the Degrate Delegation. The studio is where the duos later made acquaintances through relationships the members were in at the time. In a 2011 interview, Dalvin stated, "there was this girl gospel group called UNITY and then the Don DeGrate Delegation, which Devanté and I played in. So we met some of the girls from UNITY and [one] was dating K-Ci before we even met [and she] would always tell us that we need to meet K-Ci and JoJo." A short time after meeting, the brothers started living together after leaving their families to pursue musical careers.

At 16, DeVanté Swing traveled to Minneapolis, hoping to visit Paisley Park in order to audition to Prince. Swing would later say, "I was up at Paisley Park every day begging for a job, asking people to listen to my tape. The receptionist kept saying she couldn't help me". The rejection motivated Swing to relocate back to North Carolina, and work to improve his songwriting and production skills. Upon arriving, Swing continued to record with the group's additional members, eventually forming Jodeci, and began work on a demo tape to present to label executives. The name Jodeci is an abbreviation of all the members' names. "Jo" comes from JoJo, "De" comes from Devante, and Ci comes from K-Ci, with Dalvin joining the group afterwards.

The members soon drove to New York City with a 29-song, three-tape demo, anticipating a signing deal with upstart Uptown Records. Upon arriving to New York, and without the knowledge of the whereabouts of the MCA subsidiary, the group used a phone book to find the company's address, located on Clinton Street in Brooklyn. Swing later commented on the signing, "we didn't have an appointment but I knew what Uptown was, and I wanted us to be there." The group was quickly denied an audition until Andre Harrell agreed to hear the demo. In skepticism of the high quality production, Harrell requested the group to perform, where they performed "Come and Talk to Me" and "I'm Still Waiting", in the presence of Jeff Redd. Hip hop artist Heavy D overheard the performance and consulted Harrell, eventually taking the group out to dinner and awarding them a recording contract.

Jodeci was assigned to Uptown intern Sean Combs, who took on the task of developing the new act. Counteracting the refined styles prominent in R&B showcased by New Edition and Boyz II Men, Mr. Dalvin created the group's image. Combs helped get the image through to Andre Harrell, perpetuating hip-hop fashion, such as baseball caps and Timberland boots, to the group in order to establish a different aesthetic in the genre. The group was introduced after providing background vocals on the 1990 song "Treat Them Like They Want to Be Treated", and performed live on Soul Train on June 11, 1991.

=== 1990–1995: Forever My Lady, Diary of a Mad Band, and The Show, the After Party, the Hotel ===
Landing a recording deal in 1990, the group released their debut album Forever My Lady the next year. Writer Ronin Ro maintained, "They no longer resembled gospel singers… Puffy also asked them to build their mystique by posing for photos with their backs to the camera, which he borrowed from Guy's stage show." The album's seductive energy showcased DeVanté's songwriting, establishing a uniqueness in his production that mixed old-fashioned soul singing with New Jack Swing, creating a production of great boldness. It featured the number 1 R&B singles "Forever My Lady", "Stay", and "Come and Talk to Me". Mr. Dalvin recalls how the album Forever My Lady was created, "The last version of the album that was released only took us a week to finish because we had already written the songs. It was about getting our sounds right because the vocals were already done. It was us going back in the studio recreating the beats and the melodies... Most of the songs were written before we left North Carolina. My brother was 16 and I was 14 when we wrote the songs..." The album went on to sell over three million copies.

In 1993, a minor feud resulted over the band's second album, Diary of a Mad Band; Jodeci, unhappy with their treatment by Uptown, flirted with the idea of leaving for Death Row Records, which resulted in almost zero promotion for the album. Despite this, it reached number 3 on the Billboard 200 and number-one on the R&B album chart, where it stayed for two weeks. It spawned the #1 R&B hit "Cry for You", as well as the other successful singles "Feenin'" and "What About Us". Diary of a Mad Band eventually went double platinum. Jodeci also covered "Lately", a Stevie Wonder song, for the Uptown MTV Unplugged release in 1993. The group's version of the song was released as a promotional single, claiming the number one spot on the Hot R&B/Hip-Hop Singles & Tracks chart as the group's fourth number one R&B hit. It was also Jodeci's highest peaking pop hit, reaching number four on the Billboard Hot 100 in August 1993. It sold 900,000 copies and was certified gold by the Recording Industry Association of America. A studio version of the song was included on Diary of a Mad Band.

Jodeci's third album, The Show, the After Party, the Hotel, was released in July 1995, reaching the second spot on the Billboard 200, making it the group's highest-peaking release and topping the U.S. R&B Albums chart. By September 1995, it was certified platinum in sales by the RIAA, after sales exceeding one million copies in the United States. The album contained the Top 40 hits "Freek'n You", "Love U 4 Life" and "Get On Up".

=== 2014–present: Return and The Past, the Present, the Future ===
In February 2014, Timbaland revealed that he was in the process of working with Jodeci on their comeback album.

On November 7, 2014, Jodeci reunited and performed a medley of their classic songs at the 2014 Soul Train Awards. The performance also included a snippet of a brand-new single titled "Nobody Wins", which was released on December 22, 2014. The song is the first single released by Jodeci in over 18 years. The last song released by the group was "Get on Up", in 1996. Prior to the performance, the group had not taken the stage together in the U.S. since 2006.

On January 28, 2015, a second single titled "Every Moment" was released. Also in that same month, it was announced by Epic Records that Jodeci had been signed to the label to release their new album. Timbaland, who recently brought his Mosley Music Group over to Epic, worked on the album. Their fourth album, The Past, the Present, the Future, was released on March 31, 2015. It was their first album in 20 years.

Shortly after the album's release, a Jodeci reunion tour was announced. The first show took place on June 6, 2015, in Richmond, Virginia, as a part of the city's 11th annual Stone Soul Music Festival. Jodeci headlined the event, marking the group's first official concert performance together in the United States since 1995.

== Members ==
Current

- K-Ci – (1988–present) (primary lead vocalist, songwriter, tenor/baritone)
- JoJo – (1988–present) (lead vocalist, songwriter, second tenor)
- DeVante Swing – (1988–present) (producer, songwriter, background vocals;)
- Mr. Dalvin – (1988–present) (producer, songwriter, background vocals; tenor)

== Discography ==
Studio albums

- Forever My Lady (1991)
- Diary of a Mad Band (1993)
- The Show, the After Party, the Hotel (1995)
- The Past, the Present, the Future (2015)

== Awards and honors ==
- Billboard Music Award for Top R&B Album – Forever My Lady (1992)
- Billboard Music Award for Top R&B Song – Come and Talk to Me (1992)
- Billboard Music Award for Top R&B Artist (1992)
- Soul Train Music Award for Best R&B/Soul Album, Group, Band or Duo – Forever My Lady (1992)
- Soul Train Music Award for Best R&B/Soul Single – "Lately" (1994)
- North Carolina Music Hall of Fame (2012)

== See also ==
- K-Ci & JoJo
- Swing Mob
