= K-Ci =

American singer

- Also known as: Little Cedric; K-Ci
- Born: Cedric Renard Hailey; September 2, 1969 (age 57); Charlotte, North Carolina, U.S.
- Origin: Monroe, North Carolina, U.S.
- Genres: R&B; soul; pop; gospel; rock
- Occupations: Singer; songwriter
- Years active: 1983–present
- Labels: Atlanta International; AIR Gospel; Uptown; MCA; Epic
- Member of: K-Ci & JoJo; Jodeci
- Formerly of: The Hailey Singers

Cedric Renard Hailey (born September 2, 1969), known professionally as K-Ci (formerly Little Cedric as a member of Little Cedric and the Hailey Singers), is an American singer, songwriter and member of K-Ci & JoJo and Jodeci.

Although Hailey is best known as the lead singer of Jodeci and second-lead singer of K-Ci & JoJo, he participated on different solo projects as K-Ci, most notably his 1994 cover of Bobby Womack’s "If You Think You're Lonely Now", which peaked at number 17 on the Billboard Hot 100.

== Early life ==
Hailey was born in Charlotte, North Carolina, to Anita and Cliff Hailey both of whom were gospel singers. For a time, the Hailey family lived in Baltimore where they performed gospel music. The family later moved to Monroe when Cedric was a teen. He attended Garinger High School.

== Career ==
Along with younger brother, Joel (known professionally as "JoJo") and his father, Hailey recorded three gospel albums as "Little Cedric and the Hailey Singers" beginning with the 1983 release I'm Alright Now by Atlanta International Records, Gospel. Though the album failed to place on any Billboard magazine charts, the next two releases, 1984's Jesus Saves and God's Blessing in 1985, both placed upon the Billboard Gospel Albums chart; the former at No. 4 and the latter at No. 22.

Cedric and Joel's gospel singing eventually connected them with the DeGrate brothers, Donald "DeVante Swing" DeGrate and Dalvin DeGrate, with whom they formed the R&B group Jodeci. As lead vocalist for the group, Hailey and Jodeci would release three multi-platinum albums between 1991 and 1995. In 1996, the group announced a hiatus from recording and releasing music. Hailey continued to record with his brother as the duo K-Ci & JoJo, releasing five albums between 1997 and 2013.

As K-Ci, he recorded the 1992 duet "I Don’t Want to Do Anything" with Mary J. Blige on her debut album What's the 411?. Also, his cover of Bobby Womack's "If You Think You're Lonely Now" was featured on the soundtrack to the 1994 film, Jason's Lyric. It was released as a single and peaked at number 17 on the Billboard Hot 100.

== Personal life ==
Hailey dated fellow R&B singer and then label-mate Mary J. Blige from 1992 to 1997. Blige stated that they were engaged, which Hailey denied.

The two Hailey brothers are cousins of R&B singers Fantasia Barrino, Dave Hollister, Calvin Richardson, and Stephanie Mills.

Hailey's son Devin released a single in 2020 titled "Kick It 2 U".

== Discography ==
with Jodeci

- Forever My Lady (1991)
- Diary of a Mad Band (1993)
- The Show, the After Party, the Hotel (1995)
- The Past, The Present, The Future (2015)

with K-Ci & JoJo

- Love Always (1997)
- It's Real (1999)
- X (2000)
- Emotional (2002)
- My Brother's Keeper (2013)

Solo album

- My Book (2006)
