= Dalvin DeGrate =

American musician (born 1971)

- Also known as: Mr. Dalvin
- Born: Dalvin Ertimus DeGrate; July 23, 1971 (age 55); Hampton, Virginia, U.S.
- Origin: Charlotte, North Carolina, U.S.
- Genres: R&B; hip hop; soul
- Occupations: Record producer; singer; songwriter; rapper
- Instruments: Vocals; drums; piano
- Years active: 1988–present

Dalvin Ertimus DeGrate (born July 23, 1971), better known by his stage name Mr. Dalvin, is an American R&B and soul singer, songwriter, record producer, and rapper. He is one-quarter of the R&B group Jodeci, and the younger brother of Jodeci member DeVante Swing.

== Career ==
The rapper for the group, DeGrate rarely sang lead on Jodeci tracks, although he has production and songwriting credits on Diary of A Mad Band and The Show, The After Party, The Hotel. He occasionally played drums onstage.

DeGrate released his first solo album, Met.A.Mor.Phic, on April 18, 2000, with the single "Why Can't We". He moved to Def Jam Recordings, and recorded his second album, Met.A.Mor.Phic 2: The Rivalry of a Singer and A Rapper, with appearances by Method Man, Redman, Ludacris. The album was due to be released in 2010, but he decided to leave Def Jam and form his own label, DeGrate Productions, after a dispute.

In 2017, he released a single called "Vindication (Get Money) feat GOODZ", he also made a video for this single.

On his 52nd birthday on July 23, 2023, DeGrate released an EP called FAMOUS. Mr. Dalvin wrote, produced, performed lead and background vocals, and was the studio engineer for the release. His nephew Justin Burton provided additional production. Of the release, Mr. Dalvin wrote the following: "'FAMOUS' is a project I made to have the nostalgia of 90's harmonies, production and lyrical story telling. Also, paying homage to some of my favorite MC's grouping up such as LL COOL J, RAKIM and Big Daddy Kane."

== Family ==
DeGrate has a brother, Devante Swing, born Donald DeGrate, Jr. They toured as Gospel singers before they joined with JoJo Hailey and K-Ci Hailey (born Cedric Hailey), forming Jodeci, and a younger brother Derek DeGrate.

== Discography ==
with Jodeci

- Forever My Lady (1991)
- Diary of a Mad Band (1993)
- The Show, the After Party, the Hotel (1995)
- The Past, The Present, The Future (2015)

Solo albums/EPs

- Met.A.Mor.Phic (2000)
- Famous (2023)
- Egomaniac (2024)
