= DeVante Swing =

American musician (born 1969)

DeVanté Swing
- Born: Donald Earle DeGrate Jr. September 29, 1969 (age 57); Hampton, Virginia, U.S.
- Occupations: Record producer; singer; songwriter; rapper
- Years active: 1987–present
- Children: 3
- Relatives: Dalvin DeGrate (brother), Derek DeGrate (brother)
- Musical career
- Origin: Charlotte, North Carolina, U.S.
- Genres: R&B; hip hop; soul; new jack swing
- Instruments: Vocals; keyboards; piano; guitar
- Labels: Uptown; MCA
- Formerly of: Jodeci; Swing Mob

Donald Earle DeGrate Jr. (born September 29, 1969), better known by his stage name DeVanté Swing, is an American record producer, singer, songwriter and rapper. He is best known as the main songwriter and producer of the R&B group Jodeci, which includes his younger brother Dalvin “Mr. Dalvin” DeGrate. DeVante Swing also created Swing Mob, which consisted of various artists he discovered and mentored, such as Missy Elliott, Timbaland, Magoo, Ginuwine, Static Major with Playa, Darryl Pearson, Tweet, Jimmy Douglass, Stevie J, and Chad "Dr. Ceuss" Elliott among others.

== Career ==
At age 16, DeVanté Swing traveled to Minneapolis, hoping to visit Paisley Park in order to audition for Prince. Swing would later say, "I was up at Paisley Park every day begging for a job, asking people to listen to my tape. The receptionist kept saying she couldn't help me". The rejection motivated Swing to relocate back to North Carolina, and work to improve his songwriting and production skills.

In his early career, Swing served as a mix engineer, while simultaneously producing for other acts. He mixed and engineered Hi-Five's 1990 single "I Just Can't Handle It", along with its accompanying remixes. Swing rose to prominence in the 1990s as the founding member of the R&B group Jodeci, which he formed with his younger brother Dalvin DeGrate, and singers Cedric "K-Ci" Hailey, and Joel "JoJo" Hailey. Swing served as the group's leader, and primary songwriter and producer.

Swing founded the musical collective Swing Mob in 1991, which was joined by then-unknown regional acts including Timbaland & Magoo, Tweet, Missy Elliott, Ginuwine, Stevie J and Static Major. He is also credited as a video director for Jodeci, co-directing the videos for "Feenin'" with Hype Williams and "Freek'n You" with Brett Ratner. Swing has also mentored Florida-based rapper Flo Rida in the early stages of his career.

== Discography ==
- Forever My Lady (1991)
- Diary of a Mad Band (1993)
- The Show, the After Party, the Hotel (1995)
- The Past, the Present, the Future (2015)
