= K-Ci & JoJo discography =

- Studio albums: 5
- Compilation albums: 5
- Singles: 15
- Music videos: 15

The discography of K-Ci & JoJo, an American R&B duo made up of Cedric and Joel Hailey, consists of five studio albums, five compilation albums, fifteen singles, and fifteen music videos. K-Ci & JoJo were originally the lead singers of the R&B group Jodeci before signing a record deal with MCA Records. In 1997, they released their debut album, Love Always. In the United States, Love Always peaked at number five on the Billboard 200, and number two on the Top R&B/Hip-Hop Albums chart and was certified triple-platinum by the Recording Industry Association of America (RIAA). Internationally, the album reached the top 50 on the Swiss, Canadian, and Australian Charts, and appeared on the UK and Swedish Albums Chart. The album produced four singles, including the multi-national number-one song, "All My Life".

In 1999, K-Ci & JoJo released their second studio album, It's Real. It peaked at number eight on the Billboard 200, number two on the R&B/Hip Hop Albums chart, and was certified platinum by the RIAA. Internationally, the album reached top 20 on the Dutch Mega Album Top 100, the Canadian Albums Chart, and appeared on the New Zealand Top 40 Albums and the Australian Albums Chart. The album spawned four singles, including "Tell Me It's Real", which peaked at number two in the US on the Billboard Hot 100. The duo's third studio album, X, was released in 2000. The album peaked at number twenty on the Billboard 200, number three on the Top R&B/Hip-Hop Albums chart, and was certified platinum by the RIAA. The album also appeared on the New Zealand Top 40 Albums and the Dutch Mega Album Top 100. The album produced three singles: "Crazy", "All The Things I Should Have Known", and "Wanna Do You Right", with the first peaking at number eleven on the Hot 100.

Emotional (2002) was the duo's fourth studio album to be released. Emotional peaked at number sixty-one on the Billboard 200 and number eighteen on the Top R&B/Hip-Hop Albums chart. The album produced two singles, yet neither charted on the Billboard Hot 100. K-Ci & JoJo followed the release of Emotional with three compilation albums: All My Life: Their Greatest Hits (2005), peaking at number fifty-two on the Billboard 200 and number eighteen on the Top R&B/Hip-Hop Albums chart, 20th Century Masters – Millennium Collection: The Best of K-Ci & Jojo (2006) and Ballad Collection for Lovers (2007). The duo released a Japan-only album, Love (2008), followed by another compilation album, Playlist Your Way (2008).

== Albums ==
=== Studio albums ===
List of albums, with selected chart positions
Title	Album details	Peak chart positions									Sales	Certifications
Title	Album details	US	US R&B	AUS	CAN	NL	NZL	SWE	SWI	UK	Sales	Certifications
Love Always	Released: June 17, 1997; Label: MCA; Format: CD, LP	6	2	37	26	19	5	56	28	51	US: 2,900,000^{[A]}	RIAA: 3× Platinum; ARIA: Gold; MC: Platinum
It's Real	Released: June 22, 1999; Label: MCA; Format: CD, CS, LP, digital download	8	2	47	19	14	34	—	—	56		RIAA: Platinum; MC: Gold
X	Released: December 5, 2000; Label: MCA; Format: CD, CS	20	3	—	—	88	30	—	—	187		RIAA: Platinum
Emotional	Released: November 26, 2002; Label: MCA; Format: CD, LP	61	18	—	—	—	—	—	—	—		
My Brother's Keeper	Released: September 30, 2013; Label: Soda Pop/E1; Format: CD, digital download	77	20	—	—	—	—	—	—	—		
"—" denotes a recording that did not chart or was not released in that territory.

=== Compilation albums ===
List of albums, with selected chart positions
Title	Album details	Peak chart positions	
Title	Album details	US	US R&B
All My Life: Their Greatest Hits	Released: February 8, 2005; Label: Geffen; Format: CD	52	18
20th Century Masters – The Millennium Collection: The Best of K-Ci & JoJo	Released: 2006; Label: Geffen; Format: CD	—	—
Ballad Collection for Lovers	Released: December 5, 2007; Label: Geffen; Format: CD	—	—
Love	Released: 2008; Label: Formula; Format: CD	—	—
Playlist Your Way	Released: August 5, 2008; Label: Geffen; Format: CD	—	—
"—" denotes a recording that did not chart or was not released in that territory.

== Singles ==
=== As lead artist ===
List of singles, with selected chart positions
Title	Year	Peak chart positions										Certifications	Album
Title	Year	US	US R&B	AUS	BEL (FL)	NL	NOR	NZL	SWE	SWI	UK	Certifications	Album
"How Could You"	1996	53	16	35	—	—	—	3	—	—	—		Bulletproof OST
"You Bring Me Up"	1997	26	7	89	—	—	—	15	—	—	21		Love Always
"Last Night's Letter"	1997	46	15	—	—	—	—	16	—	—	—		Love Always
"All My Life"	1998	1	1	1	3	1	2	1	4	4	8	ARIA: Platinum; BPI: Platinum; IFPI SWE: Gold	Love Always
"Don't Rush (Take Love Slowly)"	1998	—	24	—	—	25	—	21	—	—	16		Love Always
"Life"	1999	60	15	—	—	—	—	—	—	—	—		It's Real/ Life (soundtrack)
"Tell Me It's Real"	1999	2	2	63	—	13	—	4	—	—	16		It's Real
"Fee Fie Foe Fum"	1999	—	—^{[B]}	—	—	—	—	—	—	—	—		It's Real
"Girl"	2000	—^{[C]}	—	—	—	—	—	—	—	—	—		It's Real
"Crazy"	2000	11	63	55	—	39	—	—	—	—	35		X
"All the Things I Should Have Known"	2001	—^{[D]}	—	—	—	—	—	—	—	—	—		X
"Wanna Do You Right"	2001	—	60	—	—	—	—	—	—	—	—		X
"It's Me"	2002	—^{[E]}	—	—	—	—	—	—	—	—	—		Emotional
"This Very Moment"	2002	—	53	—	—	—	—	—	—	—	—		Emotional
"Knock It Off"	2013	—	—	—	—	—	—	—	—	—	—		My Brother's Keeper
"—" denotes a recording that did not chart or was not released in that territory.

=== As featured artist ===
List of singles, with selected chart positions
Title	Year	Peak chart positions										Certifications	Album
Title	Year	US	US R&B	US Rap	AUS	CAN	FIN	FRE	NZL	SWE	UK	Certifications	Album
"How Do U Want It" (2Pac featuring K-Ci & JoJo)	1996	1	1	1	24	14	19	35	2	33	17	RIAA: 2× Platinum; ARIA: Gold	All Eyez on Me
"Toss It Up" (Makaveli featuring K-Ci & JoJo, Danny Boy & Aaron Hall)	1996	—	—	39	—	—	—	7	—	15			The Don Killuminati: The 7 Day Theory
"Royalty" (Gang Starr featuring K-Ci & JoJo)	1998	—	—	—	—	—	—	—	—	—	—		Moment of Truth
"From the Ground Up" (E-40 featuring Too Short & K-Ci & JoJo)	1998	—	—	—	—	—	—	—	—	—	—		The Element of Surprise
"2 Minute Warning" (Big Sean and Jhene Aiko featuring K-Ci & JoJo and Detail)	2016	—	—	—	—	—	—	—	—	—	—		Twenty88
"—" denotes a recording that did not chart or was not released in that territory.

== Other appearances ==
Title	Year	Artist	Album
"In Love at Christmas"	1996	—N/a	Twelve Soulful Nights
"I Really Want to Show You"	1999	The Notorious B.I.G., Nas	Born Again
"One More Mountain (Free Again)"	2000	—N/a	The Hurricane (soundtrack)
"Thug n You Thug n Me"	2001	2Pac	Until the End of Time

== Music videos ==
Title	Year	Director
"Rapper's Ball"	1996	Eric Haywood
"Don't Rush (Take Love Slowly)"	1997	Gerry Wenner
"You Bring Me Up"	1997	David Talbert
"You Bring Me Up" (Remix)	1997	David Talbert
"How Could You"	1997	Brian Luvar
"Last Night's Letter"	1997	Don Hannah
"All My Life"	1998	Lara Schwartz
"From the Ground Up"	1998	Chris Robinson
"Tell Me It's Real"	1999	Tim Story, Ramsey Nichols, Vance Burberry
"Crazy"	2000	Terry Heller, Sylvain White
"This Very Moment"	2002	Terry Heller
"It's Me"	2002	Nzingha Stewart
"Fee Fie Foe Fum"	2002	Joe Rey, Troy Smith
"Wanna Do You Right"	2002	Aaron Courseault
"It's Me"	2002	Nzingha Stewart

== Notes ==
- A United States sales figures for Love Always as of June 1999.
- B "Fee Fie Foe Fum" did not enter R&B/Hip-Hop Songs, but peaked at number one on Bubbling Under R&B/Hip-Hop Singles, a chart which acts like a 25-song extension to R&B/Hip-Hop Songs.
- C "Girl" did not enter the Billboard Hot 100, but peaked at number thirty on the Rhythmic Top 40, a component chart of the Hot 100.
- D "All The Things I Should Have Known" did not enter the Billboard Hot 100, but peaked at number thirty on the Rhythmic Top 40, a component chart of the Hot 100.
- E "It's Me" did not enter R&B/Hip-Hop Songs, but peaked at number five on Bubbling Under R&B/Hip-Hop Singles, a chart which acts like a 25-song extension to R&B/Hip-Hop Songs.
