= DeVante Swing production discography =

The following list is a discography of production by DeVante Swing

== 1990 ==
- Al B. Sure! – Private Times...and the Whole 9! – "Touch You"; "Had Enuf?"; "Sure! Thang"; "You Excite Me"
- Jeff Redd – A Quiet Storm – "In My House"; "Giving My Love to You"
- Father MC – "Lisa Baby" (Daddy Radio Remix)

== 1991 ==
- Jodeci – Forever My Lady (entire album)
- Various Artists – Strictly Business soundtrack – Jodeci – "Let's Fly"

== 1992 ==
- Christopher Williams – Changes – "All I See"; "Please, Please, Please"
- Mary J. Blige – What's the 411? – "I Don't Want to Do Anything Else" (featuring K-Ci Hailey of Jodeci)
- Michael Cooper – Get Closer – "I Just Love You"; "Do You"
- CeCe Peniston – Finally – "I See Love"
- Al B. Sure! – Sexy Versus – "Playing Games"; "Turn You Out"

== 1993 ==
- Jodeci – Diary of a Mad Band (entire album)
- Various Artists – Who's the Man? soundtrack – Jodeci – "Let's Go Through the Motions"

== 1994 ==
- Usher – Usher – "Can U Get wit It"; "Whispers" (Co-produced w/ Darryl Pearson)
- Changing Faces – Changing Faces – "Keep It Right There"; "Keep It Right There (Remix)"
- Various Artists – Above the Rim soundtrack – H-Town – "Part Time Lover"; B-Rezell – "Blowed Away"
- Various Artists – Murder Was the Case – Jodeci featuring Tha Dogg Pound – "Come Up to My Room"
- Sista – 4 All the Sistas Around da World (entire album excluding track #9)

== 1995 ==
- Jodeci – The Show, the After Party, the Hotel (entire album excluding track #4 and #8)
- Al Green – Your Heart's in Good Hands – "Could This Be Love"
- Various Artists – Dangerous Minds soundtrack – DeVante Swing featuring Static – "Gin & Juice"
- Sean Levert - 12" - "Put Your Body Where Your Mouth Is (Roughneck Mix)"
- Tony Thompson – Sexsational – "Slave"

== 1996 ==
- 2Pac – All Eyez on Me – "No More Pain"
- Montell Jordan – More... – "What's on Tonight"
- Various Artists – The Nutty Professor soundtrack – Da Bassment – "Love You Down"
- Horace Brown – Horace Brown – "You Need a Man"
- Danny Boy – "Slip N' Slide" (Co-produced w/ Reggie "Devell" Moore)

== 1997 ==
- K-Ci & JoJo – Love Always – "Still Waiting"

== 1998 ==
- Kurupt – Kuruption! – "I Wanna..."; "Put That on Something"

== 1999 ==
- Imajin – Imajin – "Fresh", "I Don't Wanna Play Basketball"

== 2000 ==
- Liberty City Fla – Liberty City Fla – "Come on Back"
- Dalvin DeGrate – Met.A.Mor.Phic – "Dangerous"
- K-Ci & JoJo – X – "Get Back"; "Slip and Fall" (Hidden Track)

== 2001 ==
- Various Artists – What's the Worst That Could Happen? soundtrack – Le-Jit – "My Love, Your Love"
- Terrell – Uptown International – "Who Got"; "Loyalty"
- Ray J – This Ain't a Game – "Wet Me"

== 2002 ==
- Aerosmith – O, Yeah! Ultimate Aerosmith Hits – "Lay It Down"

== 2005 ==
- DJ Quik – Trauma – "Quikstrumental (Quik's Groove 7)" (featuring Jodeci) (Co -produced w/ David Blake and Dalvin Degrate)

== 2007 ==
- Mýa – Liberation- "Smilin" (Co – produced w/ Dalvin Degrate) ~~(Unreleased)~~

== 2009 ==
- Mariah Carey - Memoirs of an Imperfect Angel – "The Impossible"

== 2010 ==
- Danny Boy – It's About Time – "If U Don't Mind"; "It's All About U"
- Mighty Clouds of Joy – At the Revival- "I Love You Lord" (Co-produced with Raphael Saadiq)

== 2014 ==
- Anthony Lewis – "Candy Rain" feat. Billy Bang (Co – produced w/ Bradd Young)

== 2015 ==
- Jodeci – The Past, The Present, The Future (entire album)

== 2017 ==
- Dren Calisas - "Plastic" ft. Devante Swing

== 2024 ==
- Mr. Dalvin – Egomaniac – "Down with U"; "9 to 5"
