= Before I Lay (You Drive Me Crazy) =

Single by CeCe Peniston featuring JoJo Hailey

from the album I'm Movin' On
- B-side: "Movin' On"; "Finally"; Remix
- Released: November 5, 1996
- Length: 4:47 (album version)
- Label: A&M
- Songwriters: Darryl Pearson; Joel Hailey
- Producers: Joel "JoJo" Hailey; Darryl Pearson (co-producer)

CeCe Peniston featuring JoJo Hailey singles chronology
"Movin' On" (1996)	"Before I Lay (You Drive Me Crazy)" (1996)	"Somebody Else's Guy" (1998)

"Before I Lay (You Drive Me Crazy)" is a 1996 song by American musician CeCe Peniston, released as a duet with JoJo Hailey of Jodeci. The single was released as the second single from the singer's third and final studio album, I'm Movin' On (1996). It peaked at number fifty-two on the US Billboard R&B chart, while reaching number twenty-one on the Billboard Bubbling Under Hot 100 Singles chart (a virtual equivalent to number 121 on the Billboard Hot 100).

== Critical reception ==
Peter Miro from Cash Box wrote, "Hailey makes a strong statement when paired with house diva Peniston, here flexing her soulful capabilities in a steamy situation that should make for an urban radio mainstay in key markets. Approaches the chemistry of K Ci's duet with Mary J. Blige three years ago, and has party slow jam written all over it for close-clinging baptisms of fire."

== Track listings and formats ==
=== Double A-side ===
- 12", US, Promo, #AMPRO 00342
1. "Before I Lay" (LP Version) – 4:47
2. "House Party" (LP Version) – 4:11
3. "House Party" (Instrumental Version) – 4:12
4. "Movin' On" (East Coast Flava Mix with Rap) – 4:02
5. "Movin' On" (East Coast Flava Mix – Instrumental) – 4:01
6. "House Party" (Acappella) – 3:57

=== A and B-side ===
- CS, US, #31458 2004 4
- CD, US, #31458 2004 2
1. "Before I Lay" (Radio Edit with Intro) – 4:16
2. "Movin' On" (East Coast Flava Mix with Rap) – 4:02
- MCD, US, #31458 2005 2
1. "Before I Lay" (Radio Edit with Intro) – 4:16
2. "Before I Lay" (LP Version) – 4:47
3. "Movin' On" (East Coast Flava Mix with Rap) – 4:02
4. "Finally" (12" Choice Mix) – 7:04
- MCD, US, Promo, #AMSAD 00338
1. "Before I Lay" (Radio Edit with Intro) – 4:16
2. "Before I Lay" (LP Version) – 4:47
3. "Before I Lay" (Radio Edit without Intro) – 4:17
4. "Before I Lay" (Instrumental) – 4:48
- MCD, US, Promo, #AMSAD 00369
1. "Before I Lay" (Radio Remix) – 4:10
2. "Before I Lay" (Grand Jury Mix) – 4:02
3. "Before I Lay" (Back of the Room Mix) – 4:08
4. "Before I Lay" (LP Version) – 4:47
- 12", US, #AMPRO 00371
1. "Before I Lay" (Radio Remix) – 4:10
2. "Before I Lay" (Grand Jury Mix) – 4:02
3. "Before I Lay" (Back of the Room Mix) – 4:08
4. "Before I Lay" (Radio Remix Instrumental) – 4:04
5. "Before I Lay" (Grand Jury Mix Instrumental) – 4:05
6. "Before I Lay" (Back of the Room Mix Instrumental) – 4:09
7. "Before I Lay" (LP Version) – 4:47

== Credits and personnel ==
- CeCe Peniston – lead/back vocal
- Joel Hailey – lead/back vocal, lyrics, producer
- Darryl Pearson – music, co-producer, additional musician, programming
- Gerald Baillergeau – remix
- Victor Merritt – remix
- Craig Nobles – remix coordinator
- John Wydrycs – engineer
- John Pace – mix
- Manny Lehman – executive producer
- Damon Jones – executive producer
- Greg Ross – design
- Daniela Federici – photography

Additional credits

- "House Party" (A-side)
- "Movin' On" (B-side)
- "Finally" (B-side)

== Charts ==
Chart (1996)	Peak position
US Hot R&B/Hip-Hop Songs (Billboard)	52
Chart (1997)	Peak position
US Bubbling Under Hot 100 Singles (Billboard)	20
