= All My Life =

All My Life may refer to:

== Film and television ==
- All My Life (1966 film), an American experimental short film by Bruce Baillie
- All My Life (2004 film), a Philippine film starring Kristine Hermosa and Aga Muhlach
- All My Life (2008 film), an Egyptian film by Maher Sabry
- All My Life (2020 film), an American drama film by Marc Meyers
- All My Life (TV series), a 2009 Philippine drama

== Albums ==
- All My Life (Charles Brown album), 1990
- All My Life (Jim Witter album) or the title song (see below), 1999
- All My Life (Jocelyn Enriquez album) or the title song, 2003
- All My Life (Viper album) or the title song, 2007
- All My Life: Their Greatest Hits or the title song (see below), by K-Ci & JoJo, 2005

== Songs ==
- "All My Life" (Alyona Lanskaya song), 2012
- "All My Life" (Benjamin Ingrosso song), 2024
- "All My Life" (Billy Joel song), 2007
- "All My Life" (Falling in Reverse song), 2024
- "All My Life" (Foo Fighters song), 2002
- "All My Life" (Jim Witter song), 1999
- "All My Life" (K-Ci & JoJo song), 1998
- "All My Life" (Kenny Rogers song), 1983
- "All My Life" (Lil Durk song), 2023
- "All My Life" (Linda Ronstadt song), 1990
- "All My Life" (Uriah Heep song), 1972
- "All My Life (In the Ghetto)", by Jay Rock, 2008
- "All My Life", by Robbie Williams from Britpop, 2026
- "All My Life", by America from Silent Letter, 1979
- "All My Life", by Bobby Vinton, B-side of the single "Sealed with a Kiss", 1960
- "All My Life", by Flo Rida from Mail on Sunday, 2008
- "All My Life", by Heritage Singers from Just a Little More Time, 1982
- "All My Life", by Krezip from Plug It In, 2007
- "All My Life", by L.A.P.D. from Who's Laughing Now, 1991
- "All My Life", by Major Lazer from Major Lazer Essentials, 2018
- "All My Life", by Mariah Carey from Glitter, 2001
- "All My Life", by MC Magic from Magic City, 2006
- "All My Life", by N Force, 2008
- "All My Life", by Ozzy Osbourne from Ordinary Man, 2020
- "All My Life", by Shayne Ward from Shayne Ward, 2006
- "All My Life", by Styles P featuring Akon, a non-album track from Time Is Money, 2006
- "All My Life", by Wynter Gordon from With the Music I Die, 2011
- "All My Life", written by Sam H. Stept, 1936
- "All My Life", by Jeff Lynne's ELO from Alone in the Universe, 2015

== See also ==
- All of My Life (disambiguation)
