= JoJo Hailey =

American singer (born 1971)

- Also known as: JoJo
- Born: Joel Lamont Hailey; June 10, 1971 (age 55); Charlotte, North Carolina, U.S.
- Origin: Monroe, North Carolina, U.S.
- Genres: R&B; gospel
- Occupations: Singer; songwriter
- Years active: 1983–present
- Labels: Atlanta International; AIR Gospel; Uptown; MCA; Epic; JT Entertainment
- Member of: Jodeci; K-Ci & JoJo
- Formerly of: Little Cedric & The Hailey Singers
- Spouse: Tashaunda "Tiny" Hailey (divorced)

Joel Lamont Hailey (born June 10, 1971), known professionally as JoJo, is an American singer and songwriter, known for being a lead vocalist of the R&B groups Jodeci and K-Ci & JoJo, both of which spawned platinum and multiplatinum albums. Hailey wrote the latter group's Billboard Hot 100 number one hit, "All My Life", and was nominated at the 41st Annual Grammy Awards for Best R&B Song.

Hailey started releasing music as a solo artist in 2020 with "Special", later remixed to feature Snoop Dogg.

== Early life ==
Joel Hailey was born in Charlotte, North Carolina to Cliff and Anita Hailey on June 10, 1971. Hailey was raised in Monroe and grew up in a Pentecostal family.

== Career ==
=== The Hailey Singers ===
Hailey and his brother Cedric ("K-Ci") toured the Southern United States and recorded three gospel albums with their father Cliff as Little Cedric & the Hailey Singers.

=== Jodeci ===
Hailey and K-Ci connected with fellow teenage gospel singers, brothers Donald ("DeVante Swing") and Dalvin DeGrate, after having been introduced through their girlfriends. The Hailey brothers and DeVante coined the group name Jodeci. In 1985, Hailey recorded lead vocals for songs DeVante wrote and produced for a girlfriend. Later, Hailey and DeVante decided to go to New York to pitch a demo Hailey sang and DeVante wrote, with K-Ci and Dalvin joining them at the last minute. Uptown Records president Andre Harrell signed Jodeci upon hearing them.

As lead vocalist for the group, Hailey and Jodeci would release three platinum albums between 1991 and 1995. The group had a "wild, sexual, bad-boy image". In 1996, the group announced a hiatus from recording and releasing music.

=== K-Ci & JoJo ===
Moving away from the sexual, hip-hop sound of Jodeci to softer family-friendly romantic ballads, Hailey and his brother continued recording as the duo K-Ci & JoJo, releasing five albums between 1997 and 2013, two of which went multi-platinum: debut album Love Always and 1999's It's Real. The former saw the duo start to write their own songs which they had not done before, and spawned Billboard Hot 100 number one hit "All My Life", which Hailey wrote with lyrical inspiration from his daughter. "All My Life" was nominated at the 41st Annual Grammy Awards for Best R&B Song.

=== Solo career ===
On February 14, 2020, Hailey released his first solo single "Special", an R&B and pop song about "universal love", intended to be part of the lead-up to an upcoming solo debut studio album. It was also the first release of JT Entertainment, a label he and his wife at the time launched for their family. Hailey later released a remix of the song featuring Snoop Dogg.

== Personal life ==
Hailey and his brother had alcohol use disorder, which the duo sought treament for in the 2010 series K-Ci and JoJo...Come Clean. Hailey has attributed his alcoholism to Jodeci, and further told magazine Sister 2 Sister, "It was just party and BS. But I didn’t think it was taking a toll on me until the first time that I said I wasn’t going to drink anything, and I fell into a seizure."

Hailey has diabetes.

Hailey was married to Tashaunda "Tiny" Hailey and the two had eight children, one of which is singer Sakoya Wynter. Hailey and Tashaunda appeared in 2012 on the VH1 series Couples Therapy, where they referred to Hailey's alcoholism as their relationship's main problem.

== Discography ==
with Jodeci

- Forever My Lady (1991)
- Diary of a Mad Band (1993)
- The Show, the After Party, the Hotel (1995)
- The Past, The Present, The Future (2015)

with K-Ci & JoJo

- Love Always (1997)
- It's Real (1999)
- X (2000)
- Emotional (2002)
- My Brother's Keeper (2013)
