= I'm Movin' On (CeCe Peniston album) =

Studio album by CeCe Peniston
- Released: September 9, 1996
- Recorded: 1995–1996
- Length: 71:56
- Label: A&M
- Producers: Dave Hall; Darren "Nitro" Clowers & Romany Malco; Danny Sembello & Albert Willis; Bradley & Storm; JoJo Hailey; Darryl Pearson; Oji Pierce; Steve "Silk" Hurley; Jorge "G. Man" Corante

CeCe Peniston chronology
Good News in Hard Times (1995)	I'm Movin' On (1996)	The Best Of (1998)

Singles from I'm Movin' On
- 1. "Movin' On" Released: July 16, 1996; 2. "Before I Lay (You Drive Me Crazy)" Released: November 5, 1996

I'm Movin' On is the third studio album recorded by American singer CeCe Peniston, released on September 9, 1996, by A&M Records. Taking Peniston's work deeper foray into mainstream R&B genre, A&M consulted a number of pop musicians to record with her, including Dave Hall, Gordon Chambers, and Andrea Martin. Other collaborated include DJ Steve "Silk" Hurley, Damon Thomas, Danny Sembello, Darryl Pearson, and Jorge "G-Man" Corante.

Upon release, the album garnered mixed to favorable reviews from music critics. Most of them criticized the predominant promoting of R&B tracks, as well as her label for insistence on Peniston abandoning dance community in favor of urban arena. In terms of chart performance, the album has been viewed as a commercial failure with no entry on the US Billboard 200, nor overseas. The only out of two released singles that cracked the US Billboard Hot 100 list was the lead single "Movin' On", which climbed to number eighty-three, eventually. "Somebody Else's Guy", an update of Jocelyn Brown's hit from 1984, became a surprising hit for Peniston in addition, after being promoted as support of her greatest hits compilation, and the closing release under her contract with A&M.

== Background ==
I'm Movin' On was supposed to be Peniston's deeper foray into mainstream R&B followed the pattern of her previous release Thought 'Ya Knew (1994), in which Peniston began her unsuccessful transition into the R&B market. The label heavily focusing on hip-hop influenced R&B jams and a variety of slow ballads invited several producers to join her session, in front of Dave Hall and Gordon Chambers, who co-wrote the title track. This time, Peniston reprised her fellow collaboration with Steve Hurley on two songs. "The Last to Know" that she co-wrote, and "Don't Know What to Do". None of these would be released on single, though. In order to push her musical horizons further, A&M also featured JoJo Hailey of the group Jodeci and Tenina Stevens (also known as Suga T), as the first time ever that another artists would be vocally credited on her record.

== Critical reception ==
Professional ratings
Review scores
Source	Rating
AllMusic	2.5/5 stars
Encyclopedia of Popular Music	3/5 stars
Entertainment Weekly	B
USA Today	2.5/4 stars

I'm Movin' On met with mixed to favorable reviews from music critics. AllMusic editor Jose F. Promis labeled the A&M calculations to reincarnate Peniston into an R&B diva as "total alienation of her core fans" and her "career killer". Apart from giving the album two and a half (out of five) stars, he branded most of songs as "R&B clichés of the 1990s abound", but praised "Don't Know What to Do" and the singer's cover version of Jocelyn Brown's "Somebody Else's Guy". William Stevenson from Entertainment Weekly foresaw in his B-graded review that the "blah ballads" are [to be] waste of Peniston's voice tailor-made for dance genre, citing also "Don't Know What to Do" and "House Party" as the album's most powerful pipes that should not had been overlooked on single. Rudi Meyer of Vibe was the most enthusiastic about Peniston's approach towards R&B mainstream. Appealing to the singer's past urban hit singles (such as "Keep on Walkin", "Inside That I Cried" and "I'm in the Mood"), she found potential in her new material (namely in "The Last to Know", "If It Should Rain" and "Before I Lay"). Meyer rated the final result as "mostly pleasing outcome". Nevertheless, she praised club oriented tracks at the same time.

== Chart performance ==
Two weeks after its official shipping to music stores, the album entered the US Billboard Top R&B/Hip-Hop Albums Chart at number forty-eight (its peak) on September 28, 1996. In total, the set spent four weeks in the component chart, with no appearance in the Billboard 200, or in the overseas albums charts.

== Track listing ==
I'm Movin' On — Standard edition
No.	Title	Writer(s)	Producer(s)	Length
1.	"Movin' On"	Dave Hall; CeCe Peniston; Gordon Chambers	Hall	3:46
2.	"Looking for a Love That's Real"	Darren Clowers; Romany Malco	Clowers; Malco	3:54
3.	"Sprung on You (Groove Me)"	Albert Willis; Danny Sembello	Willis; Sembello	5:00
4.	"Try"	Bradley Spalter; Emanuel Officer; Robert Daniels	Spalter; Storm	4:55
5.	"Before I Lay (You Drive Me Crazy)"	JoJo Hailey; Darryl Pearson	Hailey; Pearson	4:47
6.	"Somebody Else's Guy"	Jocelyn Brown; Annette E. Brown	Darren "Nitro" Clowers	5:37
7.	"If It Should Rain"	Clowers; Malco	Clowers	3:48
8.	"House Party"	Peniston; Oji Pierce; Emanuel	Pierce; Officer	4:11
9.	"The Last to Know"	Peniston; Steve Hurley	S. Hurley	5:22
10.	"Interlude I"	Andrea Martin; Jorge Corante; Livio Harris; Damon Thomas; Budd Ford	Jorge "G-Man" Corante	1:03
11.	"I'm Over You"	Martin; Corante; Harris; Thomas; Ford	Corante	4:40
12.	"Don't Know What to Do"	S. Hurley; Tonia Hurley	S. Hurley	4:49
13.	"Interlude II"	Martin; Corante; Harris; Thomas; Ford	Corante	1:03
Total length:				71:56

US and Canadian edition bonus track
No.	Title	Writer(s)	Producer(s)	Length
14.	"Movin' On" (G. Man Slammin' Remix without Rap)	Hall; Peniston; Chambers	Hall; Corante^{[a]}	4:25

Australian, European and Japanese edition bonus tracks
No.	Title	Writer(s)	Producer(s)	Length
15.	"Don't Know What to Do" (Silk House Mix)	S. Hurley; Tonia Hurley	S. Hurley	5:31
16.	"Looking for a Love That's Real" (David Morales House Mix)	Clowers; Malco	Clowers; Malco; David Morales^{[a]}	4:05

Notes

- ^{^a} denotes additional producer

"Sprung on You (Groove Me)"

"Don't Know What to Do"

"The Last to Know"

== Credits and personnel ==
- Scott Ahaus – Engineer, Mixing
- Anas Allaf – Guitar
- Keith Andes – Keyboards
- Ryan Arnold – Engineer, Mixing Assistant
- Craig Bauer – Mixing
- Bradley – Guitar, Keyboards, Producer, Programming
- Bob Brockman – Mixing
- Annette Brown – Composer
- Jocelyn Brown – Composer
- Sue Ann Carwell – Vocals (Background)
- Gordon Chambers – Composer, Vocal Arrangement
- Rob Chiarelli – Mixing
- Darren "Nitro" Clowers – Composer, Drum Programming, Keyboards, Producer
- Jorge Corante – Bass, Composer, Keyboards, Piano, Producer, Remixing
- Robert Daniels – Composer
- M. Doc – Vocal Arrangement
- Gerard Dure – Hair Stylist
- Daniela Federici – Photography
- Neil Gustafson – Mixing Assistant
- Stephanie Gylden – Assistant Engineer
- Joel "JoJo" Hailey – Composer, Guest Artist, Producer, Vocals (Background)
- Dave "Jam" Hall – Composer, Producer
- Leroy Harris – Composer
- Steve "Silk" Hurley – Arranger, Composer, Engineer, Producer
- Brion James – Guitar
- Booker T. Jones – Mixing
- Damon Jones – Executive Producer
- Adam Kagan – Engineer, Mixing
- Leslie King – Bass
- Manny Lehman – Executive Producer
- Gene Lo – Assistant Engineer
- Paul Logus – Engineer, Mixing
- Romny Malco – Composer, Drum Programming, Producer
- Stephen Marcussen – Mastering
- Andrea Martin – Composer
- Victor McCoy – Assistant Engineer
- Glenn McKinney – Guitar
- Derek Nakamoto – Sampling, String Arrangements
- Nzingha – Make-Up
- Emanuel Officer – Composer, Vocal Arrangement, Vocals (Background)
- John Pace – Mixing
- Darryl Pearson – Composer, Producer, Programming
- CeCe Peniston – Composer, Primary Artist, Vocals (Background)
- Oji Pierce – Composer, Engineer, Keyboards, Producer, Programming
- Greg Ross – Art Direction, Design
- Danny Sembello – Arranger, Composer, Engineer, Producer, Vocal Arrangement
- Michael Sembello – Guitar
- Randy Smith – Stylist
- Bradley Spalter – Composer
- The Storm – Producer, Vocals (Background)
- Louis Taylor Jr. – Saxophone
- D. Thomas – Composer
- Vachik – Engineer, Mixing
- Curtis "Fitz" Williams – Flute, Saxophone
- Albert Willis – Arranger, Composer, Engineer, Horn Arrangements, Producer, Vocal Arrangement
- Jimmy Wright – Keyboards
- Starrstrukk-^[a]co-producer

Notes

- ^{^[a]} signifies a co-producer

== Charts ==
Chart performance for I'm Movin' On
Chart (1996)	Peak position
US Top R&B/Hip-Hop Albums (Billboard)	40

== Release history ==
Release history for I'm Movin' On
Region	Date	Format(s)	Label	Ref.
United States	September 9, 1996	CD; cassette	A&M Records	
Japan	September 11, 1996	CD; cassette	A&M Records	
