= List of Dutch Top 40 number-one singles of 1998 =

These hits topped the Dutch Top 40 in 1998 (see 1998 in music).

Issue date	Artist	Song
3 January	Barbra Streisand & Céline Dion	"Tell Him"
10 January	Run DMC vs. Jason Nevins	"It's Like That"
17 January	Run DMC vs. Jason Nevins	"It's Like That"
24 January	Run DMC vs. Jason Nevins	"It's Like That"
31 January	Janet Jackson	"Together Again"
7 February	Janet Jackson	"Together Again"
14 February	Janet Jackson	"Together Again"
21 February	Céline Dion	"My Heart Will Go On"
28 February	Céline Dion	"My Heart Will Go On"
7 March	Céline Dion	"My Heart Will Go On"
14 March	Céline Dion	"My Heart Will Go On"
21 March	Céline Dion	"My Heart Will Go On"
28 March	Céline Dion	"My Heart Will Go On"
4 April	Céline Dion	"My Heart Will Go On"
11 April	Céline Dion	"My Heart Will Go On"
18 April	Céline Dion	"My Heart Will Go On"
25 April	Céline Dion	"My Heart Will Go On"
2 May	K-Ci & JoJo	"All My Life"
9 May	K-Ci & JoJo	"All My Life"
16 May	K-Ci & JoJo	"All My Life"
23 May	K-Ci & JoJo	"All My Life"
30 May	The Soca Boys feat. Van B. King	"Follow the Leader"
6 June	The Soca Boys feat. Van B. King	"Follow the Leader"
13 June	The Soca Boys feat. Van B. King	"Follow the Leader"
20 June	Pras feat. ODB & Mýa	"Ghetto Supastar (That Is What You Are)"
27 June	Pras feat. ODB & Mýa	"Ghetto Supastar (That Is What You Are)"
4 July	Pras feat. ODB & Mýa	"Ghetto Supastar (That Is What You Are)"
11 July	Brandy & Monica	"The Boy Is Mine"
18 July	Brandy & Monica	"The Boy Is Mine"
25 July	Brandy & Monica	"The Boy Is Mine"
1 August	Marco Borsato	"De bestemming"
8 August	Marco Borsato	"De bestemming"
15 August	Marco Borsato	"De bestemming"
22 August	Des'ree	"Life"
29 August	Des'ree	"Life"
5 September	Des'ree	"Life"
12 September	Des'ree	"Life"
19 September	Des'ree	"Life"
26 September	Faithless	"God Is a DJ"
3 October	Boyzone	"No Matter What"
10 October	Boyzone	"No Matter What"
17 October	Boyzone	"No Matter What"
24 October	Boyzone	"No Matter What"
31 October	Boyzone	"No Matter What"
7 November	Boyzone	"No Matter What"
14 November	Boyzone	"No Matter What"
21 November	Vengaboys	"Boom, Boom, Boom, Boom!!"
28 November	Vengaboys	"Boom, Boom, Boom, Boom!!"
5 December	Vengaboys	"Boom, Boom, Boom, Boom!!"
12 December	Vengaboys	"Boom, Boom, Boom, Boom!!"
19 December	Emilia	"Big Big World"
26 December	Emilia	"Big Big World"

== See also ==
- 1998 in music
