= Don't Rush =

Don't Rush may refer to:

- "Don't Rush" (Kelly Clarkson song), a song by Kelly Clarkson featuring Vince Gill
- "Don't Rush" (Young T & Bugsey song), a song by Young T & Bugsey featuring Headie One
  - #DontRushChallenge, a phenomenon circulating the Internet that incorporates the song
- "Don't Rush (Take Love Slowly)", a song by K-Ci & JoJo
- "Don't Rush", a song by Jay Sean from Me Against Myself
- "Don't Rush", a song by Silk from Silk
- "Don't Rush", a song by Tegan and Sara from Sainthood
- "Don't Rush", a song by Scott Savol

== See also ==
- "Don't Rush Me", a 1988 song by Taylor Dayne
