= Emotional (disambiguation) =

Emotional may refer to emotion or:

== Music ==
=== Albums ===
- Emotional (Falco album) a 1986 album by Falco
- Emotional (K-Ci & JoJo album), a 2002 album K-Ci & JoJo
- Emotional (Carl Thomas album), a 1999 album by Carl Thomas
- Emotional (Jeffrey Osborne album)

=== Songs ===
- "Emotional", song by American Juniors from the album American Juniors
- "Emotional", song by Carl Thomas from the album Emotional
- "Emotional", song by Casely from the album 1985
- "Emotional", song by Charli XCX from the mixtape Number 1 Angel
- "Emotional", song by Diana DeGarmo from the album Blue Skies
- "Emotional", song by K-Ci & JoJo from the album Emotional
- "Emotional", song by Kesha from her album Rainbow
- "Emotional", song by Loverboy from the album Get Lucky
- "Emotional", song by Mikaila from the album Mikaila
