= I Ain't Mad at Cha =

1996 single by 2Pac featuring Danny Boy

Single by 2Pac featuring Danny Boy

from the album All Eyez on Me
- Released: September 15, 1996
- Recorded: October 13, 1995
- Studio: Can-Am Studios (Los Angeles, California)
- Genre: Hip-hop; R&B
- Length: 4:53
- Label: Island; Interscope; Death Row
- Songwriters: Tupac Shakur; Delmar Arnaud
- Producers: Dat Nigga Daz; Suge Knight (exec.)

2Pac singles chronology
"How Do U Want It" (1996)	"I Ain't Mad at Cha" (1996)	"Toss It Up" (1996)

Danny Boy singles chronology
"Slip N’ Slide" (1996)	"I Ain't Mad at Cha" (1996)	"Toss It Up" (1996)

Music video
- "I Ain't Mad at Cha" on YouTube

"I Ain't Mad at Cha" is a song by American rapper 2Pac from Shakur's fourth studio album, All Eyez on Me (1996). It was released on September 15, 1996, two days after Shakur's death, as the album's fourth and final single. The song features contemporary soul singer Danny Boy providing vocals for its hook and was written by Shakur, Danny Boy and Daz Dillinger, who produced the song using a sample from DeBarge's "A Dream". The lyrics focus on Shakur reminiscing about past friends, love interests and associates he has lost touch with. The song is widely considered one of Shakur's best with Cheo Hodari Coker calling it "possibly the best song 2Pac has ever recorded". In 1998, The Source ranked the song's three verses second in its category of "dopest verses" in the history of hip-hop.

The single release differs from the version on the album with re-recorded vocals, alternative lyrics and a live band playing the beat. "I Ain't Mad at Cha" charted well internationally reaching number 13 on the UK Singles chart and number 58 on the Billboard Hot 100 Airplay. It also charted in the Top 30 on New Zealand, Netherlands, Ireland and Germany. It was not released as a single in the United States making it ineligible to chart on the Billboard singles charts. Dr. Dre played a small portion of the instrumental melody in the Super Bowl LVI halftime show on February 13, 2022.

== Background ==
The track was produced by Daz Dillinger and samples the song "A Dream" by DeBarge. The album version of the song was recorded one day after Tupac was released from prison, and was the second song he recorded that day, "Ambitionz Az a Ridah" being the first. As the song was not released as a single in the US, "Toss It Up", the lead single for Tupac's next album, The Don Killuminati: The 7 Day Theory, was released in the US the following week, and countries that received "I Ain't Mad At Cha" as a single release had to wait until the following month (October) for the release of his next album's single. Writing credits are given to Tupac, Dillinger, Bunny DeBarge and Danny Boy.

== Composition and recording ==
The day Tupac was released from prison, he went to the studio and recorded "I Ain't Mad at Cha" and "Ambitionz Az a Ridah". When he entered the studio, the beat was already complete, and he wrote the lyrics and recorded the song all in a few hours. Shortly thereafter, Blackstreet released "Don't Leave Me" to the radio, which also interpolates the melody of "A Dream". According to Dave Aron, Tupac had a lot of energy from going into the studio. Kurupt was also in the studio at the time of recording and said that when Tupac heard the beat, he "flipped out" from excitement. He wanted to finish the song quickly and was cursing at the engineers for moving too slow.

== Music video ==
Music video screenshots

For the video, the whole song was re-recorded with a live band. Featuring horns and strings, Kevyn Lewis commissioned a band featuring Cornelius Mims, Warryn Campbell, Priest, Ricky Rouse, and Darryl Crooks to replay the track. The new track was recorded at Can-am Studio by Conley Abrams and was mixed at Larrabee North by Abrams. It was filmed 4 months before the Tupac's death.

The music video begins with Tupac and a friend of his (Bokeem Woodbine) leaving a hotel party at night. While waiting for someone to arrive a hooded man comes up, pulls out a handgun, and starts shooting in their direction. As Tupac pushes them out of the way, he gets hit by at least one bullet. In the ambulance his body gives in and he passes away. Upon entering Heaven, Tupac is told that they have been waiting for him to come for a long time, yet he still has to earn his way in. As a spirit, he then returns to Earth to watch over and guide his friend as he struggles through the next few days. While this is going on Tupac is shown rapping to his friend, (who can't see or hear him) trying to offer guidance. Finally, the video concludes with Tupac's friend gaining the courage to give condolences personally to Tupac's widow and daughter.

Look-alikes of many deceased Black entertainers are revealed to be playing the beat in the party, featuring (among others), Redd Foxx, Jimi Hendrix, Bob Marley, Nat King Cole, Miles Davis, Marvin Gaye, Billie Holiday, Florence Ballard, Sammy Davis Jr., and Louis Armstrong. Danny Boy is also present in Heaven as an angel.

In the censored version, the third verse of the song is completely replaced with new lyrics that talk about the struggles of living, God, and life after death. The video ends with the words "Dedicated to Mutulu Shakur and Geronimo Pratt" appearing on the screen. These individuals are Tupac's stepfather and godfather, respectively. The music video was voted #33 on the "MTV Top 100 of 1996" ranking music videos.

=== Personnel ===
Filming crew

- First aired: September 18, 1996
- Filmed: May 15, 1996
- Production company: Been There
- Director(s): Tupac Shakur & Kevin Swain
- Producer(s): Taj Lewis
- Photography: Patrick Loungeway (cinematographer)

Additional crew

- 1st assistant director: Joe Oz

== Live performances ==
Shakur performed the song live on February 17, 1996 on Saturday Night Live.

== Track listing ==
- CD single (DRWCD5/854 843-2)
1. "I Ain't Mad at Cha" - Edit
2. "I Ain't Mad at Cha" - LP Version
3. "Skandalouz"
4. "Heartz of Men"
- 12" maxi single (12 DRW5/854 843-1)
1. "I Ain't Mad at Cha" - Edit
2. "I Ain't Mad at Cha" - LP Version
3. "Skandalouz"
4. "Heartz of Men"
- Cassette single (DRWMC5/854 842-4)
1. "I Ain't Mad At Cha" (Edit)
2. "Skandalouz"

== Charts ==
=== Weekly charts ===
Chart (1996–1997)	Peak position
Australia (ARIA)	47
Germany (Media Control AG)	26
Ireland (IRMA)	19
Netherlands (Dutch Top 40)	16
Netherlands (Single Top 100)	15
New Zealand (Recorded Music NZ)	2
Scottish Singles Sales (Official Charts)	33
Sweden (Sverigetopplistan)	35
UK Singles (Official Charts)	13
UK R&B Singles (OCC)	3
UK Airplay (Music Week)	25
UK Pop Tip Club Chart (Music Week)	39
US Billboard Hot 100 Airplay	58
US R&B/Hip-Hop Airplay (Billboard)	18

=== Year-end charts ===
Chart (1997)	Position
New Zealand (Recorded Music NZ)	23

== Certifications ==
Region	Certification	Certified units/sales
New Zealand (RMNZ)	Platinum	30,000^{‡}
United Kingdom (BPI)	Silver	200,000^{‡}
^{‡} Sales+streaming figures based on certification alone.

== In popular culture ==
Rich Juzwiak of Gawker in an article expressed his disappointment in a 2014 musical about Shakur's life, the article titled, "We're Kind of Mad at Cha: The 2Pac Musical Holler If Ya Hear Me".

U.S. Attorney General Eric Holder referenced the song in December 2014, when protestors interrupted him while he was giving a speech in Atlanta, Georgia at Ebenezer Baptist Church. In response, Holder stated to the protestors, "I’m not mad at cha".

On February 13, 2022, Dr. Dre played the first few notes of ‘I Ain’t Mad At Cha’ on the piano at the Super Bowl LVI halftime show.
