= Danny Boy (singer) =

American singer (born 1977)

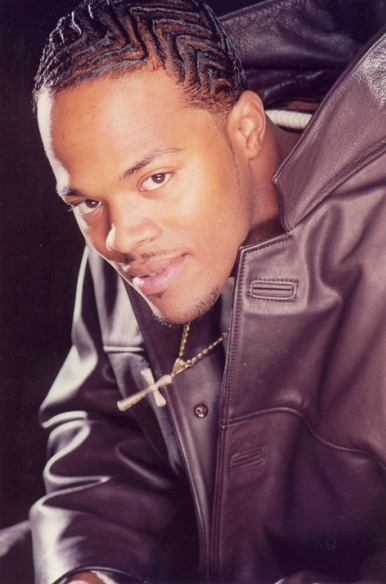
- Born: Daniel Steward; October 31, 1977 (age 48); Chicago, Illinois, U.S.
- Occupation: Singer
- Years active: 1994–present
- Children: 3
- Musical career
- Genres: R&B; soul; neo soul; gospel
- Labels: Death Row; Interscope; Eclectic Soul

Daniel Steward (born October 31, 1977), better known as Danny Boy, is an American R&B/soul singer.

== Career ==
Danny Boy originally signed for a five-year run with Death Row Records by Suge Knight at the age of 16. He made his debut on 1994's Murder Was the Case soundtrack with the R&B track "Come When I Call" (produced by DJ Quik). In 1995, he released his first single titled "Slip N Slide" (produced by Reggie Moore and co-produced by DeVante Swing) with then-unknown artist Ginuwine singing the chorus. The video for the song was shot in Cabo, and also features scenes with 2Pac, Snoop Dogg, Nate Dogg, and Tha Dogg Pound. Danny is best known for singing the choruses of the 2Pac songs "I Ain't Mad at Cha", "What'z Ya Phone #", "Picture Me Rollin'" and "Heaven Ain't Hard 2 Find" on All Eyez on Me, as well as "Toss It Up" on The Don Killuminati: The 7 Day Theory. He had recorded several albums' worth of music while on Death Row Records, but none were released during his time there.

Danny Boy also made an appearance on Tha Row's soundtrack to Eddie Griffin's Dysfunktional Family and also appeared on American Idol, but was disqualified due to continued Internet promotion by his former label. On April 20, 2010, Death Row Records, under new management, released Danny Boy's 1996 debut album It's About Time featuring production by DJ Quik and DeVante Swing.

== Personal life ==
Danny Boy was born on October 31, 1977, and grew up in the Austin neighborhood on the West Side of Chicago, Illinois. In 2016, Danny Boy announced that he is gay. He has said in numerous interviews that the suicide of a man he had been in a relationship with pushed him to come out, and that he wants to be a positive role model for LGBTQ people experiencing shame over their sexuality.

== Discography ==
=== Studio albums ===
- It's About Time (2010)
- Black Heart (2023)

=== Songs ===
- "Come When I Call" (from Murder Was the Case soundtrack) (1994)
- "Slip N Slide" featuring Tha Dogg Pound (1996)
- "Christmas Song", "Peaceful Christmas", "This Christmas" (from Christmas on Death Row) (1996)
- "It's Over Now", "I Can't Get Enough" (from Gridlock'd soundtrack) (1997)
- "Beautiful Lady" featuring K-Ci (from Suge Knight Represents: Chronic 2000) (1999)
- "Do What You Do" (from Death Row Records Full Pardon Sampler) (2009)
- "Rock, Roll & Bounce", "So in Love" (from Ultimate Death Row Box Set) (2009)

=== Guest appearances ===
- 1996: "I Ain't Mad at Cha" (2Pac feat. Danny Boy), BPI: Silver
- 1996: "What'z Ya Phone #" (2Pac feat. Danny Boy)
- 1996: "Picture Me Rollin'" (2Pac feat. Big Syke, C.P.O. & Danny Boy)
- 1996: "Heaven Ain't Hard 2 Find" (2Pac feat. Danny Boy)
- 1996: "Too Late Playa'" (MC Hammer feat. 2Pac, Big Daddy Kane, Nutt-So & Danny Boy)
- 1996: "Toss It Up" (2Pac feat. Danny Boy, K-Ci & JoJo & Aaron Hall)
- 1996: "Just Getting My Money" (Crucial Conflict feat. Danny Boy),
- 1997: "Front Porch" (Twista feat. Danny Boy & Speedknot Mobstaz)
- 1999: "Stand Strong" (Tha Realest feat. Danny Boy, Jewell)
- 1999: "Around the World" (J-Flexx feat. Danny Boy)
- 2002: "Dysfunktional Family" (Crooked I feat. Danny Boy & Eastwood)
- 2002: "Too Street for T.V." (N.I.N.A feat. Danny Boy)
- 2004: "Snoopin'" (Twista feat. Danny Boy)
- 2009: "Caught Up in the Game" (Doobie feat. Danny Boy) (from Ultimate Death Row Box Set)
