= Movin' On (CeCe Peniston song) =

1996 single by CeCe Peniston

Single by CeCe Peniston featuring Suga T.

from the album I'm Movin' On
- B-side: "Remix"
- Released: July 23, 1996
- Studio: DMH Studios, Elmsford, New York
- Genre: R&B; soul
- Length: 3:46 (album version)
- Label: A&M
- Songwriters: Dave Hall; CeCe Peniston; Gordon Chambers
- Producer: Dave "Jam" Hall

CeCe Peniston featuring Suga T. singles chronology
"Hit by Love" (1994)	"Movin' On" (1996)	"Before I Lay (You Drive Me Crazy)" (1996)

Music video
- "Remix version" on YouTube

"Movin' On" is a song by American musician CeCe Peniston, released on July 23, 1996, by A&M Records, as the lead single from her third studio album, I'm Movin' On (1996). The track is co-written and produced by Dave Hall and charted at number twenty-nine on the US Billboard R&B chart. It also reached number 83 on the Billboard Hot 100. A remixed version of the song peaked at number ten on the Billboard Hot Dance Music/Maxi-Singles Sales chart and entered the top 30 in Japan.

== Critical reception ==
Larry Flick from Billboard magazine wrote that "Movin' On" "shows her finally fitting comfortably into the R&B sound that she has been cultivating over the past few years. Her booming voice now possesses the darker shades needed to hang tough in circles inhabited by such artists as Faith Evans and Mary J. Blige." Ha also noted that producer Dave "Jam" Hall contributes to Peniston's vocal confidence by placing her in "a sleek, funk-fortified musical context that complements her phrasing style quite well." Peter Miro from Cash Box stated that the song "kicks up a danceable groove that touches base with Peniston's solid club foundation, yet her emotive phrasing connects with a deeper soul reservoir this format merely hints at. Targeting new consumers, she's a firm fixture in the R&B camp henceforth. Guest artists G. Man and Suga T. flavor the best of the lot."

== Track listings and formats ==
- CS, US, #31458 1656 4
- CD, US, #31458 1656 2
1. "Movin' On" (LP Edit) – 3:25
2. "Movin' On" (G.Man with Rap Edit) – 3:59
- MCD, JP, #POCM-1179
- MCD, US, #31458 1657 2
1. "Movin' On" (Original LP Edit) – 3:50
2. "Movin' On" (G.Man with Rap Edit) – 3:59
3. "Movin' On" (Smooth Club Mix Edit With Rap) – 4:13
4. "Movin' On" (Hard Club Mix) – 8:00
5. "Movin' On" (LP Version) – 3:46
- 12", US, #31458 1657 1
1. "Movin' On" (Hard Club Mix) – 8:00
2. "Movin' On" (Smooth Club Mix) – 6:18
3. "Movin' On" (Club Dub) – 8:00
4. "Movin' On" (Dave Hall Hip Hop Remix) – 4:00
5. "Movin' On" (G.Man Slammin' Remix with Rap Male) – 4:23
6. "Movin' On" (G.Man Slammin' Remix with Rap) – 4:23
7. "Movin' On" (G.Man Slammin' Remix without Rap) – 4:23
8. "Movin' On" (LP Version) – 3:46
- MCD, US, Promo, #AMSAD 00254
1. "Movin' On" (Original LP Edit) – 3:25
2. "Movin' On" (Original LP Edit with Rap) – 3:50
3. "Movin' On" (Original LP Edit with Long Intro) – 3:28
4. "Movin' On" (LP Version) – 3:46
5. "Movin' On" (Smooth Club Mix Edit) – 4:13
6. "Movin' On" (G.Man with Rap Male Edit) – 3:59
7. "Movin' On" (G.Man with Rap Edit Feat. Suga T.) – 3:59
8. "Movin' On" (G-Man Mix without Rap Edit) – 3:50
- 12", US, Double, Promo, #AMPRO 00256
1. "Movin' On" (Hard Club Mix) – 8:00
2. "Movin' On" (Club Dub) – 8:00
3. "Movin' On" (Smooth Club Mix) – 6:18
4. "Movin' On" (Dave Hall Hip Hop Remix) – 4:00
5. "Movin' On" (G.Man Slammin' Remix with Rap Male) – 4:23
6. "Movin' On" (G.Man Slammin' Remix with Rap) – 4:23
7. "Movin' On" (G.Man Slammin' Remix without Rap) – 4:23
8. "Movin' On" (Rub-a-Dub-Dub) – 7:58
9. "Movin' On" (Major Dub) – 9:21
10. "Movin' On" (Tribal Dub) – 8:00
11. "Movin' On" (Dave Hall Hip Hop Remix Instrumental) – 4:00
12. "Movin' On" (G.Man Slammin' Remix Instrumental) – 4:23
13. "Movin' On" (LP Version) – 3:46
14. "Movin' On" (Acapella) – 3:47

== Credits and personnel ==
- CeCe Peniston – lead/backing vocal, lyrics, engineer
- Dave Hall – music, producer
- Gordon Chambers – lyrics, vocal arrangement
- Tenina Stevens (as Suga T.) – rapping
- Jorge Corante (as G.Man) – rapping, remix, additional producer
- StarrStrukk – additional producer[a]
- Paul Logus – engineer, mix
- Junior Vasquez – mix, additional producer
- Joe Moskowitz – engineer, programming
- P. Dennis Mitchell – remix engineer
- Manny Lehman – executive producer
- Damon Jones – executive producer
- Daniela Federici – photography
- Greg Ross – design

== Charts ==
Chart (1996)	Peak position
Canada Dance/Urban (RPM)	16
US Billboard Hot 100	83
US Dance Singles Sales (Billboard)	10
US Hot R&B/Hip-Hop Songs (Billboard)	29
US Cash Box Top 100	78
