= Toss It Up =

1996 single by Makaveli

Single by Makaveli featuring Danny Boy, K-Ci & JoJo, and Aaron Hall

from the album The Don Killuminati: The 7 Day Theory
- Released: September 26, 1996; October 12, 1996 (UK)
- Recorded: June 7, 1996
- Studio: Ameraycan (North Hollywood)
- Genre: Dirty rap, R&B
- Length: 5:06
- Label: Death Row; Makaveli; Interscope
- Songwriters: Tupac Shakur, Aaron Hall, Danny Steward, Reggie "Devell" Moore, Cedric "K-Ci" Hailey, Joel "JoJo" Hailey, Teddy Riley
- Producers: Reggie "Devell" Moore; Demetrius Ship

Makaveli singles chronology
"I Ain't Mad at Cha" (1996)	"Toss It Up" (1996)	"To Live & Die in L.A." (1996)

Danny Boy singles chronology
"I Ain't Mad at Cha" (1996)	"Toss It Up" (1996)	"It’s Over Now" (1997)

K-Ci and JoJo singles chronology
"How Could You" (1996)	"Toss It Up" (1996)	"You Bring Me Up" (1997)

Aaron Hall singles chronology
"Scent of Attraction" (1996)	"Toss It Up" (1996)	"All the Places (I Will Kiss You)" (1998)

Music video
- "Toss It Up" on YouTube

"Toss It Up" is a song by rapper Tupac Shakur from his fifth studio album, The Don Killuminati: The 7 Day Theory (1996). Released under the stage name Makaveli, the song served as the lead single to the posthumous album. It was first released in the United States just under two weeks after his death, peaking at number thirty-three on the R&B singles chart. The song is known for including a diss toward Dr. Dre and instrumentally being very similar to the production on the song "No Diggity". It features vocals and singing from Aaron Hall, Danny Boy, and K-Ci & JoJo.

The single release altered slightly to the version found on the album. The album version was later included on Shakur's 1998 compilation Greatest Hits with a new mix and alternative lyrics.

== Controversy ==
The original version of the song shared close similarities to Blackstreet's "No Diggity". Due to that, Teddy Riley sent a cease and desist order which forced them to reproduce the song. A new verse, dissing Dr. Dre, was also recorded for the new version.

== Music video ==
The official music video for "Toss It Up" was directed by American director Lionel C. Martin. The video, set inside a garage, features Shakur wearing safety goggles and using a blow torch and baseball bat. It was reportedly shot on the evening of September 6, 1996, making it the last music video Shakur shot in his lifetime. Singer Aaron Hall does not make an appearance in the video.

== Versions ==
- Album version:

The only version to feature the "album vibe" introduction.

- Single version:

With "needle drop" introduction by 2Pac, entirely different mix, and less, "Boom!", backing vocals throughout.

- Radio Edit:

2Pac’s outro disses are removed, instead the backing vocals are the focus.

- Video Version

Features additional outro vocals by KC instead of the outro disses by 2Pac.

- Greatest Hits version:

An entirely new mix of the album version, minus the "album vibe" intro, and features some altered lyrics.

- Original early mix produced by Dr. Dre.

Officially unreleased, though leaked, this version doesn't include the final, Dre diss verse.

- Nu-Mixx version:

A remix by the Tha Row Hitters found on the 2003 compilation album, Nu-Mixx Klazzics.

== Charts ==
=== Weekly charts ===
Weekly chart performance for "Toss It Up"
Chart (1996–1997)	Peak position
Australia (ARIA)	39
New Zealand (Recorded Music NZ)	7
UK Hip Hop/R&B (Official Charts)	4
UK Singles (Official Charts)	15
US R&B/Hip-Hop Airplay (Billboard)	34

=== Year-end charts ===
Year-end chart performance for "Toss It Up"
Chart (1997)	Position
New Zealand (Recorded Music NZ)	42

== Certifications ==
Region	Certification	Certified units/sales
New Zealand (RMNZ)	Gold	5,000^{*}
^{*} Sales figures based on certification alone.
