= Life (K-Ci & JoJo song) =

Single by K-Ci & JoJo

from the album It's Real and Life
- Released: January 26, 1999
- Recorded: 1998–1999
- Length: 3:33
- Label: MCA / Interscope
- Songwriter: Robert Kelly
- Producer: R. Kelly

K-Ci & JoJo singles chronology
"Don't Rush (Take Love Slowly)" (1998)	"Life" (1999)	"Tell Me It's Real" (1999)

"Life" is a song by American R&B duo K-Ci & JoJo. It was the first single off their second studio album It's Real. It is also featured on the soundtrack for the 1999 movie Life. The lyrics were written by R&B singer & producer R. Kelly.

The lyrics can be interpreted in many different ways, but it mainly tells a narrative about being imprisoned for life.

== Weekly charts ==
Chart (1999)	Peak position
US Billboard Hot 100	60
US Hot R&B/Hip-Hop Singles & Tracks	15
