= Love (K-Ci & JoJo album) =

2008 compilation album by K-Ci & JoJo

Compilation album by K-Ci & JoJo
- Released: February 6, 2008
- Recorded: 2007–2008
- Genre: R&B
- Length: 71:25
- Label: Formula Recordings

K-Ci & JoJo chronology
20th Century Masters - The Millennium Collection: The Best of K-Ci & JoJo (2007)	Love (2008)	Playlist Your Way (2008)

Love is the fifth compilation album by K-Ci & JoJo, released February 6, 2008. It was only released in Japan.

== Track listing ==
CD
No.	Title	Length
1.	"I Just Wanna Be With You"	5:39
2.	"Tsubomi"	5:51
3.	"I Believe"	4:40
4.	"Every Time I Close My Eyes"	5:47
5.	"Winter Song"	4:57
6.	"Hitori"	3:33
7.	"Story"	4:48
8.	"Keep Holding U"	5:46
9.	"What I Wanted the Most"	4:57
10.	"Snow Flowers" (cover of Yuki no Hana)	5:40
11.	"Take a Chance on Love"	4:29
12.	"Baby I"	4:43
13.	"I Just Wanna Be with You" (Acoustic Version)	5:38
14.	"Winter Song" (Acoustic Version)	4:57
