= All My Life: Their Greatest Hits =

Greatest hits album by K-Ci & JoJo
- Released: February 8, 2005
- Recorded: 1994–2002
- Genre: R&B
- Label: Geffen Records

K-Ci & JoJo chronology
Emotional (2002)	All My Life: Their Greatest Hits (2005)	The Best of K-Ci & JoJo (2007)

All My Life: Their Greatest Hits is the greatest hits album (eighth overall) released by K-Ci & JoJo. It contains all of their singles as a duo as well as favorites from their four albums.

Professional ratings
Review scores
Source	Rating
Allmusic	4/5 stars

== Track listing ==
1. Last Night's Letter
2. You Bring Me Up
3. How Could You
4. All My Life 1998
5. Don't Rush (Take Love Slowly) 1998
6. If You Think You're Lonely Now (K-Ci)
7. I Care About You (with Babyface, Kevon Edmonds, Melvin Edmonds)
8. Never Say Never Again
9. Through Heaven's Eyes
10. Life
11. Tell Me It's Real
12. Girl
13. Crazy (Alternate Version)
14. Wanna Do You Right
15. I Can't Find the Words
16. This Very Moment
17. Special
18. Down for Life

== Personnel ==
Credits for All My Life: Their Greatest Hits adapted from AllMusic.

* Darrell "Delite" Allamby – composer, producer
- Kwaku Alston – Photography
- Cornelio Austin – composer
- Babyface – composer, producer, background vocals (Track 7, 8)
- Gerald Baillergeau – producer
- Rory Bennett – composer, producer
- Jack Benson – producer
- Big Yam – composer
- Blacq – producer
- Steven Carty – Photography
- Alex Coletti – producer
- Deyon Dobson – composer, producer
- Kevin Edmonds – Lead and background vocals (Track 7)
- Melvin Edmonds – Lead and background vocals (Track 7)
- Joey Elias – composer, producer
- Drew FitzGerald – design
- Richard Griffin – composer
- Cedric "K-Ci" Hailey – composer
- Joel "JoJo" Hailey – composer, producer
- Roy Hamilton – producer
- C. Hampton – composer
- James Harris – composer
- Jimmy Jam – producer
- R. Kelly – composer
- Barry Korkin – editorial assistant
- Erick Labson – Mastering
- Terry Lewis – composer, producer
- Lee Lodyga – editorial Assistant
- Benny Medina – producer
- Victor Merrit – producer
- Brian Stokes Mitchell – composer
- James Mtume – producer
- Amy Neiman – Photo Research
- Ryan Null – Photo Coordination
- Emanuel Officer – composer, producer
- Tim Owens – composer, producer
- Mike Ragogna – Compilation Producer
- Teddy Riley – producer
- John "4 Daddman" Robinson – producer
- Jon-John Robinson – composer
- Ralph Stacey – producer
- Shannon Steckloff – production coordination
- Gloria Stewart – composer
- Laney Stewart – composer, producer
- Kevin Westenberg – Photography
- Joseph Wikes – Liner Notes
- Bobby Womack – composer
- James "Big Jim" Wright – composer

== Charts ==
Chart (2005)	Peak positions
US Billboard 200	18
US R&B/Hip-Hop Albums (Billboard)	52
