= Somebody Else's Guy =

1984 single by Jocelyn Brown

Single by Jocelyn Brown

from the album Somebody Else's Guy
- B-side: "Remix"
- Released: 1984
- Genre: Post-disco
- Length: 6:28 (Album version)
- Label: Shake (AU); Som Livre (BR); Unidisc/Polydor (CA); Island (EU); Liberation (NZ); 4th & B'way (UK); Vinyl Dreams (US)
- Songwriters: Jocelyn Brown; Annette E. Brown
- Producers: Jocelyn Brown; Allen George; Fred McFarlane

Jocelyn Brown singles chronology
"Take Some Time Out (For Love)" (1982)	"Somebody Else's Guy" (1984)	"Hands Off" (1984)

"Somebody Else's Guy" is a 1984 song written and popularized by Jocelyn Brown. On the US soul chart, the single peaked at number two and stalled at number 75 on the Hot 100, but in the UK it made the pop top 20. On the disco chart, "Somebody Else's Guy" peaked at number 13. It was the title track of Brown's debut solo album, released the same year.

== Credits and personnel ==
- Jocelyn Brown – writer, vocals, background vocals, producer
- Fred McFarlane – keyboards, drum programming
- James Calloway – bass
- Ivan Hampden Jr – Congas
- Connie Harvey – background vocals
- Marian Rolle – background vocals
- Wendell Morrison – background vocals
- Allen George – producer
- Fred McFarlane – producer
- Hugo Dwyer – engineering, mix engineer

=== Track listing and formats ===
U.S. 12" single, VND D01

1. "Somebody Else's Guy" (Vocal 12" Version) - 6:28
2. "Somebody Else's Guy" (Instrumental Dub) - 5:45

=== Charts ===
Chart (1984–1985)	Peak position
Belgium (Ultratop 50 Flanders)	22
Ireland (IRMA)	16
Netherlands (Single Top 100)	31
New Zealand (Recorded Music NZ)	33
UK Singles (OCC)	13
US Billboard Hot 100	75
US Hot R&B/Hip-Hop Songs (Billboard)	2

=== Certifications ===
Region	Certification	Certified units/sales
United Kingdom (BPI)	Gold	400,000^{‡}
^{‡} Sales+streaming figures based on certification alone.

== CeCe Peniston version ==
"Somebody Else's Guy"

Single by CeCe Peniston

from the album The Best Of
- B-side: "Finally" (Japan, UK); Remix
- Released: January 1998
- Recorded: 1996
- Genre: Disco
- Length: 5:37 (album version)
- Label: A&M
- Songwriters: Jocelyn Brown; Annette E. Brown
- Producer: Darren "Nitro" Clowers

CeCe Peniston singles chronology
"Before I Lay (You Drive Me Crazy)" (1996)	"Somebody Else's Guy" (1998)	"I Know You Want Me" (1998)

Music video
- 1996 Soul Train Performance on YouTube

In 1996, the song was covered by dance music singer CeCe Peniston for her studio album I'm Movin' On. In 1998, it was released as a single to promote Peniston's greatest hits collection, The Best of CeCe Peniston, an import compilation issued in 1998 only in Europe and Japan.

Both Brown in 1984, and Peniston in 1998 reached the same chart position on the UK Top 75, peaking at number thirteen.

The single reached a Top 10 position on the UK Chart-Track list, peaking at number six in February.

=== Critical reception ===
Alan Jones from Music Week praised the song by calling it "an excellent cover". He also felt that "Tuff Jam deliver two quality mixes, using their swinging groove with disco stabs, strings and Peniston's vocals, giving us an uplifting disco-fuelled club anthem with crossover potential".

=== Track listings and formats ===
CD, DE, promo, #588 497-2

1. "Somebody Else's Guy" (Classic Old School Radio Mix) – 3:47

CD, DE, #582 114-2

1. "Somebody Else's Guy" (Classic Old School Radio Mix) – 3:47
2. "Somebody Else's Guy" (Hard House Dub) – 9:18

12", UK, promo, #AMPMDJ 111

1. "Somebody Else's Guy" (LP Version) – 5:37
2. "Somebody Else's Guy" (Classic Old School 12" Mix) – 6:14

CD, UK, promo, #GUYCD1

1. "Somebody Else's Guy" (Classic Old School Radio Edit) – 3:29
2. "Somebody Else's Guy" (Uplifting Club Edit) – 3:47
3. "Somebody Else's Guy" (LP Edit) – 3:44

12", UK, promo, #AMPMDJ 117 A

1. "Somebody Else's Guy" (Tuff Jam's Classic Garage) – 7:27
2. "Somebody Else's Guy" (TJ's Ladies Choice Dub)

12", UK, #582 511 1

1. "Somebody Else's Guy" (Tuff Jam's Classic Garage) – 7:27
2. "Somebody Else's Guy" (TJ's Ladies Choice Dub)
3. "Somebody Else's Guy" (LP Version)
4. "Somebody Else's Guy" (Kupper's Uplifting Club Mix)

12", UK, promo, #DJ117

1. "Somebody Else's Guy" (Tuff Jam's Classic Garage)
2. "Somebody Else's Guy" (TJ's Ladies Choice Dub)
3. "Somebody Else's Guy" (Kupper's Uplifting Club Mix)
4. "Somebody Else's Guy" (Kupper's Dark & Funky Mix)

12", IT, #ZAC 137; 12", UK, promo, #588 500-1

1. "Somebody Else's Guy" (Classic Old School 12" Mix) – 6:14
2. "Somebody Else's Guy" (Classic Old School Instrument.) – 5:53
3. "Somebody Else's Guy" (Hard House Dub) – 9:18
4. "Somebody Else's Guy" (Classic Old School Radio Mix) – 3:47

MCD, JP, #POCM-1234; MCD, UK, #582 511-2; MCD, UK, #582 517-2

1. "Somebody Else's Guy" (Classic Old School Radio Edit) – 3:29
2. "Somebody Else's Guy" (LP Version) – 5:37
3. "Somebody Else's Guy" (Tuff Jam's Classic Garage) – 7:27
4. "Finally" (Classic Funk Radio Mix) – 3:25

MCS, UK, #582 511-4

1. "Somebody Else's Guy" (Classic Old School Radio Edit) — 3:29
2. "Somebody Else's Guy" (LP Version) – 5:37
3. "Finally" (Classic Funk Radio Mix) – 3:25
4. "Somebody Else's Guy" (Kupper's Uplifting Club Mix)

MCD, DE, #582 115-2

1. "Somebody Else's Guy" (Classic Old School Radio Mix) – 3:47
2. "Somebody Else's Guy" (Classic Old School 12" Mix) – 6:14
3. "Somebody Else's Guy" (LP Version) – 5:37
4. "Somebody Else's Guy" (Classic Old School Instrument.) – 5:53

=== Credits and personnel ===
- CeCe Peniston – lead/backing vocals
- Karl "Tuff Enuff" Brown – additional producer, remix, remix engineer
- Matt "Jam" Lamont – additional producer, remix
- David Morales – additional producer, remix
- Manny Lehman – executive producer
- Mark Mazzetti – executive producer
- Darren Clowers – producer, keyboards
- Keith Andes – keyboard
- Rom Malco – drum programming
- Terry Burns – programming
- Joey Moskowitz – programming
- Tuff & Jam – remix engineers
- Vachik Aghaniantz – engineer, mix
- Dave "EQ3" Sussman – engineer
- Clowers Studios, Hollywood, California – studio
- Hollywood Sound Recorders, Hollywood, California – mix
- Jocelyn Brown Music (BMI) – publisher
- PolyGram International (ASCAP) – publisher

Additional credits

- "Finally" (B-side)

=== Charts ===
Chart (1998)	Peak position
Europe (European Hot 100 Singles)	32
Scotland Singles (OCC)	32
UK (GfK Chart-Track)	6
UK Singles (OCC)	13
UK Dance (OCC)	2
UK Hip Hop/R&B (OCC)	6
