= You Bring Me Up =

Single by K-Ci & JoJo

from the album Love Always
- Released: May 27, 1997
- Recorded: 1996
- Genre: R&B
- Length: 4:23
- Label: MCA
- Songwriter(s): Gerald Baillergeau, Cedric R Hailey, Joel Hailey
- Producer(s): Gerald Ballergeau, Victor Merritt

K-Ci & JoJo singles chronology
"Toss It Up" (1996)	"You Bring Me Up" (1997)	"Last Night's Letter" (1997)

"You Bring Me Up" is a song recorded by American R&B duo K-Ci & JoJo. The track was written by Big Yam, Victor Merrit, Joel Hailey, and Cedric Hailey for K-Ci & JoJo's debut album, Love Always (1997).

== Charts ==
=== Weekly charts ===
Chart (1997)	Peak position
Australia (ARIA)	89
New Zealand (Recorded Music NZ)	15
Scotland (OCC)	75
UK Singles (OCC)	21
UK Dance (OCC)	31
UK Hip Hop/R&B (OCC)	6
US Billboard Hot 100	26
US Dance Music/Maxi-Single (Billboard)	20
US R&B/Hip Hop Songs (Billboard)	7
US Rhythmic Top 40 (Billboard)	34

=== Year-end charts ===
Chart (1997)	Position
UK Urban (Music Week)	17
