= Last Night's Letter =

Single by K-Ci & JoJo

from the album Love Always
- Released: September 16, 1997
- Recorded: 1996
- Genre: R&B
- Length: 4:39
- Label: MCA
- Songwriters: Gloria E Harvey, Phillip L Stewart, Cedric R Hailey
- Producer: Laney Stewart

K-Ci & JoJo singles chronology
| "You Bring Me Up" (1997) | "Last Night's Letter" (1997) | "All My Life" (1998) |

"Last Night's Letter" is a song written by Gloria E Harvey, Phillip L Stewart, Cedric R Hailey and recorded by K-Ci & JoJo that was their second single from their debut album, Love Always. MCA Records released that single on September 16, 1997.

== Charts ==
| Chart (1997) | Peak position |
|---|---|
| New Zealand (Recorded Music NZ) | 16 |
| US Billboard Hot 100 | 46 |
| US Hot R&B/Hip-Hop Songs (Billboard) | 15 |
