= It's About Time (Danny Boy album) =

Studio album by Danny Boy
- Released: April 20, 2010
- Recorded: 1994–1999
- Genre: R&B, soul
- Label: WIDEawake, Death Row
- Producer: Danny Boy (executive); DJ Quik, DeVante Swing, Dimitrius Shipp, George "G-One" Archie

Singles from It's About Time
- 1. "All About You" Released: April 9, 2010

It's About Time is the debut album by Danny Boy, released on April 20, 2010. The album features pre-recorded songs with production from DJ Quik and DeVante Swing and has guest appearances from Roger Troutman and JoJo from Jodeci.

== Track listing ==
No.	Title	Producer	Length
1.	"Intro"	DJ Quik	1:56
2.	"Blow Your Mind Away"	DJ Quik	4:16
3.	"How Many Times"	DJ Quik	4:16
4.	"Think It's About Time"	DJ Quik	5:39
5.	"Between Me and U" (featuring Roger Troutman)	DJ Quik	4:32
6.	"Break U Off"	Demetrius Shipp	4:21
7.	"So in Love"	DJ Quik	3:53
8.	"Church Interlude"	DJ Quik	4:25
9.	"Can I Come Over"	DJ Quik	5:29
10.	"Just Ride" (featuring JoJo)	DeVante Swing	5:31
11.	"If U Don't Mind"	DeVante Swing	5:25
12.	"It's All About U"	DeVante Swing	5:01
13.	"Steppin'"	DJ Quik	4:06
14.	"Mama Used to Say"	DJ Quik	2:43
15.	"Come When I Call [Remix]"	George "G-One" Archie, co-produced by DJ Quik	4:41

== Personnel ==
- Paul Schultz - artwork
- John Hyland - album sequencing, track selection
- Sonya Pead - production coordinator
- Kasey Burdick - digital engineer
- WIDEawake/Deathrow Entertainment - executive producer
- DJ Quik - producer
- DeVante Swing - producer
- Stacey Smallie - background vocals
- Mastered at: Penguin Studios
