= Wanna Do You Right =

Single by K-Ci & JoJo

from the album X
- Released: 2001
- Genre: R&B
- Length: 4:28
- Label: MCA
- Songwriters: Homer Banks, Roy "Royalty" Hamilton, Carl Hampton, Raymond Jackson, Teddy Riley
- Producer: Roy "Royalty" Hamilton

K-Ci & JoJo singles chronology
| "All the Things I Should Have Known" (2001) | "Wanna Do You Right" (2001) | "It's Me" (2002) |

"Wanna Do You Right" is a song by American R&B duo, K-Ci & JoJo. It was released in 2001 as the second single from their third studio album, X.

== Chart positions ==
| Chart (2001) | Peak position |
|---|---|
| US Hot R&B/Hip-Hop Songs (Billboard) | 60 |
