= All of My Life =

All of My Life may refer to:

- "All of My Life" (Bee Gees song), 1966
- "All of My Life" (The Carpenters song), 1969
- "All of My Life" (Irving Berlin song), 1944; first recorded by Bing Crosby, 1945
- "All of My Life", a song by Barbra Streisand from the film The Mirror Has Two Faces, 1996
- "All of My Life", a song by Cinta Laura, 2013
- "All of My Life", a song by Diana Ross from Touch Me in the Morning, 1973
- "All of My Life", a song by Joe Satriani from Shockwave Supernova, 2015
- "All of My Life", a song by Lesley Gore, 1965
- "All of My Life", a song by Magnum from Magnum II, 1979
- "All of My Life", a song by Phil Collins from ...But Seriously, 1989

== See also ==
- All My Life (disambiguation)
