= Don't Rush (Take Love Slowly) =

Single by K-Ci & JoJo

from the album Love Always
- Released: July 1998
- Genre: R&B
- Songwriter(s): Rory Bennett, Cedric R Hailey, Joel Hailey

K-Ci & JoJo singles chronology
"All My Life" (1998)	"Don't Rush (Take Love Slowly)" (1998)	"Life" (1999)

"Don't Rush (Take Love Slowly)" is a song recorded by K-Ci & JoJo. The song is the fourth and final single from their debut album, Love Always.

== Charts ==
Chart (1998)	Peak position
Netherlands (Single Top 100)	25
New Zealand (Recorded Music NZ)	21
UK Singles (OCC)	16
US Hot R&B/Hip-Hop Songs (Billboard)	24
