= How Could You (K-Ci & JoJo song) =

1996 song by K-Ci & JoJo

"How Could You" is a song by American R&B duo K-Ci & JoJo, written by Joe N Elias, Gloria E Harvey and Jonathan H. Robinson. It appears on the soundtrack to the film Bulletproof, and was also included on the duo's 1997 debut album Love Always as its closing track. It was a minor chart hit in both America and Australia, but was an even major one in New Zealand, peaking the Top 10.

== Music video ==
The official music video for the song was directed by Brian Luvar.

== Charts ==
=== Weekly charts ===
Chart (1997)	Peak position
Australia (ARIA)	35
New Zealand (Recorded Music NZ)	3
US Billboard Hot 100	53
US R&B/Hip-Hop Songs (Billboard)	16

=== Year-end charts ===
Chart (1997)	Position
New Zealand (Recorded Music NZ)	21
