= Tell Me It's Real =

Single by K-Ci & JoJo

from the album It's Real
- Released: April 27, 1999
- Recorded: 1998
- Genre: R&B; UK garage (Club Asylum & Teebone mixes); house (Astro Trax & Gridlock mixes)
- Length: 4:38 (main version); 3:40 (radio version)
- Label: MCA, AM:PM
- Songwriters: Rory Bennett, Cedric R Hailey, Joel Hailey

K-Ci & JoJo singles chronology
"Life" (1999)	"Tell Me It's Real" (1999)	"Fee Fie Foe Fum" (1999)

"Tell Me It's Real" is a song recorded by American R&B duo K-Ci & JoJo. The track was produced for K-Ci and JoJo's second studio album, It's Real (1999). The song spent 20 weeks on the Hot 100, peaking at number two behind Christina Aguilera's "Genie in a Bottle". In the UK, the song initially charted at number 40, but a re-release the following year containing UK garage mixes charted 24 places higher at number 16.

== Track listing ==
UK 12"
A1. "Tell Me It's Real" (Album Version) – 4:42
A2. "Tell Me It's Real" (Club Asylum Steppers Mix) – 5:57
B1. "Tell Me It's Real" (Full Crew Remix) – 4:52
B2. "Tell Me It's Real" (Dave 'Jam' Hall Remix) – 4:20
B3. "Tell Me It's Real" (Astro Trax Team Master Mix) – 7:10

UK CD single

1. "Tell Me It's Real" (Club Asylum Vocal Edit) – 3:36
2. "Tell Me It's Real" (Club Asylum Steppers Mix) – 5:58
3. "Tell Me It's Real" (Gridlock Mix) – 5:32
4. "Tell Me It's Real" (Original Album Version) – 4:38
5. Video – 3:36

UK 12" Remixes (2000)
A. "Tell Me It's Real" (Club Asylum Steppers Mix) – 7:40
AA1. "Tell Me It's Real" (Tee Bone Dub Mix) – 5:58
AA2. "Tell Me It's Real" (Tee Bone Vocal Mix) – 5:23

== Charts ==
=== Weekly charts ===
Chart (1999)	Peak position
Australia (ARIA)	63
Germany (GfK)	85
Netherlands (Dutch Top 40)	13
Netherlands (Single Top 100)	13
New Zealand (Recorded Music NZ)	4
UK Singles (Official Charts)	40
US Billboard Hot 100	2
US R&B/Hip-Hop Songs (Billboard)	2
US Rhythmic Top 40 (Billboard)	5

Chart (2000)	Peak position
UK Singles (Official Charts)	16
UK Dance (Official Charts Company)	4

=== Year-end charts ===
Chart (1999)	Position
Netherlands (Dutch Top 40)	84
Netherlands (Single Top 100)	69
US Billboard Hot 100	48
