= Crazy (K-Ci and JoJo song) =

2001 song by K-Ci and JoJo

Single by K-Ci & JoJo

from the album X
- Released: March 2, 2001
- Recorded: 2000
- Genre: R&B
- Length: 3:37 (radio version); 4:20 (main version)
- Label: MCA
- Songwriters: Darrell Allamby; Lincoln Browder; Cedric R Hailey; Joel Hailey
- Producer: Darrell "Delite" Allamby

K-Ci & JoJo singles chronology
"Girl" (1999)	"Crazy" (2001)	"Wanna Do You Right" (2001)

"Crazy" is a song by American duo K-Ci & JoJo. It was released in 2001 and was their first single off the album X. It was also featured on the soundtrack to the dance film Save the Last Dance, starring Julia Stiles and Sean Patrick Thomas. The song is notable for making prominent use of auto-tune years before it became popular.

== Lyrical content ==
The official music video shows what "Crazy" is about. It depicts a lover who ruminates over the poor choices he made that caused his girlfriend to break up with him. The song talks about losing sleep over it and after realizing the pain he has caused his girlfriend, he must choose between her and his life as a criminal. Once he chooses his criminal friends over her, he eventually regrets his decision and wishes to return to her. The video was directed by Terry Heller.

== Credits ==
Adapted from X liner notes.

- Darrell Delite – producer, writer, other instruments, vocoder, mixer
- K-Ci Hailey – writer, vocals
- JoJo Hailey – writer, vocals
- Paul Pesco – guitar
- Zak Sulam – guitar
- Brian Kinkead – recording
- J. Rea – recording
- Ben Arrindell – mixer
- Matt – Pro Tools engineer

== Charts ==
Chart (2001)	Peak position
Australia (ARIA)	55
Australian Urban (ARIA)	19
Germany (GfK)	84
Netherlands (Dutch Top 40 Tipparade)	2
Netherlands (Single Top 100)	39
Scottish Singles Sales (Official Charts)	90
UK Singles (Official Charts)	35
UK Dance (Official Charts)	24
UK Hip Hop/R&B (Official Charts)	10
US Billboard Hot 100	11
US Hot R&B/Hip-Hop Songs (Billboard)	63
US Pop Airplay (Billboard)	4
US Rhythmic Airplay (Billboard)	2

=== Year-end charts ===
Year-end chart performance for "Crazy"
Chart (2001)	Position
Canada Radio (Nielsen BDS)	96
