= It's Real (K-Ci & JoJo album) =

Studio album by K-Ci & JoJo
- Released: June 22, 1999
- Recorded: 1998–99
- Genre: R&B
- Length: 51:16
- Label: MCA
- Producers: Damon Jones, R. Kelly, Rory Bennett, JoJo Hailey

K-Ci & JoJo chronology
Love Always (1997)	It's Real (1999)	X (2000)

Singles from It's Real
- 1. "Life" Released: January 26, 1999; 2. "Tell Me It's Real" Released: April 27, 1999; 3. "Fee Fie Foe Fum" Released: September 14, 1999; 4. "Girl" Released: November 23, 1999

It's Real is the second studio album by American R&B duo and brothers K-Ci & JoJo, released on June 22, 1999, on MCA Records. Recording sessions took place from 1998 to 1999. The album peaked within the top 10 on the US Billboard 200 as well as Billboard's Top R&B/Hip-Hop Albums. On July 26, 1999, the album was certified platinum by the Recording Industry Association of America (RIAA) for shipments of 1,000,000 copies in the United States. It also appeared on international charts, and was certified gold by Music Canada. Upon release, It's Real received average reviews. The album would spawn four singles including the number-two hit single "Tell Me It's Real".

== Content ==
The tenth track, "Girl", the duo is expressing sorrow to a woman who is not dedicated to holding on to their hearts, with the duo singing, "Girl, if you really do love me, just let me go, let me be so I can find someone to love me."

== Release and promotion ==
It's Real was released on MCA Records on June 22, 1999, and was available on a CD, cassette, and an LP. Two bonus versions were released: one featuring "All My Life" and a Japanese edition featuring "All My Life" and "Impossible".

=== Singles ===
Four songs on It's Real became singles. "Life", released in 1999, was the first. It peaked at number 60 on the US Billboard Hot 100 and number 15 on Hot R&B/Hip-Hop Songs. The following single, "Tell Me It's Real", was the most successful from the album. It peaked at number two on the Hot 100 and Hot R&B/Hip-Hop Songs. As the only single to chart internationally, the song peaked at number four on the New Zealand Singles Chart, number 13 on the Dutch Singles Chart, and number 16 on the UK Singles Chart. The third single released was "Fee Fie Foe Fum" (1999). It did not crack the Hot 100; however, it peaked at number one on the Bubbling Under Hot 100 Singles, a chart that acts as a 25-song extension to the Hot 100. The final single released was "Girl" on January 30, 2000. It peaked at number 30 on the US Rhythmic Top 40.

== Reception ==
=== Commercial performance ===
It's Real debuted at number 8 on the US Billboard 200, which would be its peak. It also peaked at number 2 on Top R&B/Hip-Hop Albums. On July 26, 1999, the album was certified platinum by the RIAA, for shipments of 1,000,000 copies. The album charted internationally, as well. It peaked at number 26 in Canada, and on August 23, 1999, it was certified gold by Music Canada, for shipments of 50,000 copies. It also peaked at number 14 in Australia and the Netherlands, number 34 in New Zealand, and number 56 in the United Kingdom.

=== Critical response ===
Professional ratings
Review scores
Source	Rating
Allmusic	3/5 stars
Rolling Stone	2.5/5 stars

Upon its release, It's Real received average reviews from music critics. Stephen Thomas Erlewine, senior writer at Allmusic, gave the album three out of five stars, saying "it simply replicates [Love Always]". She gives "Makin' Me Say Goodbye", "I Wanna Get to Know You", "How Long Must I Cry", and "Hello Darlin'" very high praise and says the CD is worth just for those songs.

== Track listing ==
No.	Title	Writer(s)	Producer(s)	Length
1.	"Intro"	Cedric "K-Ci" Hailey; Joel "JoJo" Hailey	Mike Smoov; JoJo Hailey	1:13
2.	"Fee Fie Foe Fum"	Darryl Pearson	Darryl Pearson	4:19
3.	"I Wanna Make Love to You"	C. Hailey; J. Hailey	Mike Smoov; JoJo Hailey	3:56
4.	"I Wanna Get to Know You"	Rose; Peeps	Rose	4:40
5.	"Hello Darlin'"	Rose; Peeps	Rose	4:23
6.	"How Long Must I Cry"	J. Hailey; Pearson; Rory Bennett	Rory Bennett; JoJo Hailey	3:49
7.	"Makin' Me Say Goodbye"	Emanuel Officer; Deconzo Smith; J. Hailey; C. Hailey	Emanuel Officer; Deconzo Smith	4:10
8.	"Tell Me It's Real"	Bennett; J. Hailey	Rory Bennett; JoJo Hailey	4:38
9.	"Life"	Robert Kelly	R. Kelly	3:33
10.	"Girl"	Bennett; J. Hailey	Rory Bennett; JoJo Hailey	3:37
11.	"What Am I Gonna Do"	Pearson	Darryl Pearson	4:41
12.	"Here He Comes Again"	Babyface; Officer; Ralph Stacy	Ralph Stacy; Emanuel Officer	4:12
13.	"Momma's Song"	Anita Hailey; J. Hailey; C. Hailey	Mike Smoov	4:05

Bonus tracks
No.	Title	Writer(s)	Producer(s)	Length
14.	"All My Life"	J. Hailey; Bennett	JoJo Hailey; Rory Bennett	3:41

Japanese bonus tracks
No.	Title	Writer(s)	Producer(s)	Length
14.	"All My Life"	J. Hailey; Bennett	JoJo Hailey; Rory Bennett	3:41
15.	"Impossible"

== Personnel ==
Credits for It's Real adapted from Allmusic.

- Michael Benabib – Photography
- Rory Bennett – multi instruments, producer
- Babyface
- Chuck Berghofer – Strings
- Julie Berghofer – Strings
- Charlie Bisharat – Strings
- Jay Boberg – executive producer
- Rev. Dave Boruff – Strings
- Jacqueline Brand – Strings
- Craig Brockman – keyboards, producer
- Rebecca Bunnell – Strings
- Darius Campo – Strings
- Rob Chiarelli – mixing
- Larry Corbett – Strings
- Franklyn D'Antonio – Strings
- Chuck Domanico – Strings
- Joey "The Don" Donatello – editing, engineer, programming
- Bruce Dukov – Strings
- Charles Everett – Strings
- Drew FitzGerald – Art Direction
- Ronald Folsom – Strings
- Juliann French – Strings
- Armen Garabedian – Strings
- Jeff Griffin – assistant engineer, mixing
- Cedric "K-Ci" Hailey – executive producer, Vocal Arrangement, Vocals, Vocals (Background)
- Joel "JoJo" Hailey – drum programming, executive producer, guitar, guitar (Acoustic), Guitar (Bass), Producer, Vocal Arrangement, Vocals, Vocals (Background)
- Paul Hanson – Strings
- Terry Harrington – Strings
- Al Hershberger – Strings
- Carrie Holzman-Little – Strings
- Paul Jackson Jr. – guitar
- Damon Jones – executive producer
- Karen Jones – Strings
- R. Kelly – arranger, producer
- Peter Kent – Strings
- Anthony Kilhoffer – engineer, programming
- Armen Ksadjikian – Strings
- Derek Lee – stylist

- Jonathan LeSane – engineer
- David Low – Strings
- Tony Maserati – mixing
- Ian Mereness – assistant engineer
- Liza Montoya – stylist
- Greg Mull – engineer
- Brian O'Connor – Strings
- Bobby O'Donnell – Strings
- Emanuel Officer – producer
- Simon Oswell – Strings
- Sid Page – Strings
- Darryl Pearson – multi instruments, producer
- Dave Pensado – mixing
- Barbara Porter – Strings
- Herb Powers – Mastering
- Public Domain – composer
- Jeff Redd – executive producer
- Kendra Richards – Hair Stylist, Make-Up
- Steve Richards – Strings
- Bryon Rickerson – assistant engineer
- Anatoly Rosinsky – Strings
- John Scanlon – Strings
- Mike Smoov – guitar, guitar (Acoustic), Guitar (Bass), Producer
- David Speltz – Strings
- Ralph Stacy – producer
- Jim Thatcher – Strings
- Richard Treat – Strings
- Jeff Vereb – engineer, programming
- Randy Waldman – Conductor, String Arrangements
- Kevin Westenberg – Photography
- Ken Wild – Strings
- Evan Wilson – Strings
- Stan Wood – assistant engineer, editing, engineer, programming
- Jeffrey "Woody" Woodruff – engineer
- Ken Yerke – Strings
- Alex York – assistant engineer
- Mihail Zinovyev – Strings

== Charts and certifications ==
=== Weekly charts ===
Chart (1999)	Peak position
Australian Albums (ARIA)	47
Canadian Albums (Billboard)	19
Dutch Albums (Album Top 100)	14
New Zealand Albums (RMNZ)	34
UK Albums (Official Charts)	56
US Billboard 200	8
US Top R&B/Hip-Hop Albums (Billboard)	2

=== Year-end charts ===
Chart (1999)	Position
US Billboard 200	90
US Top R&B/Hip-Hop Albums (Billboard)	44

=== Certifications ===
Region	Certification	Certified units/sales
Canada (Music Canada)	Gold	50,000^{^}
United States (RIAA)	Platinum	1,000,000^{^}
^{^} Shipments figures based on certification alone.
