= My Brother's Keeper (K-Ci and JoJo album) =

Studio album by K-Ci & JoJo
- Released: September 30, 2013
- Recorded: 2010–2013
- Genre: R&B; soul
- Length: 56:27
- Label: Soda Pop; E1 Music
- Producer: Trevin "Big Trev" Clark; David "MD" Alford

K-Ci & JoJo chronology
Emotional (2002)	My Brother's Keeper (2013)

Singles from My Brother's Keeper
- 1. "Knock It Off" Released: June 11, 2013

My Brother's Keeper is the fifth studio album by American R&B group K-Ci & JoJo, released on September 30, 2013.

== Singles ==
"Knock It Off" was released on June 11, 2013.

== Track listing ==
No.	Title	Writer(s)	Length
1.	"Back Again (Intro)"	Earl R. Johnson, Jr., Marc Williams	0:48
2.	"Knock It Off"	Michael Bell, Eric Jackson, Jerome Perkins	3:49
3.	"Middle of the Night"	Michael Bell, Eric Jackson	3:18
4.	"My Brother's Keeper"	David Alford, Trevin "Big Trev" Clark, Roger "Mista Raja" Greene	4:31
5.	"Say Hello to Goodbye"	Devon L. Bryce, Roger "Mista Raja" Greene, Phelippe Herrera, Prentiss Thompson	3:38
6.	"Somebody Please"	James Earl Davis, Paul Irvin	3:42
7.	"What Goes Around"	Jordan Lewis, Carlett Martin, Debra Mitchell-Adams, Ayinde Thomas	3:39
8.	"Show & Prove"	Yusef "Sef Millz" Alexander, Roger "Mista Raja" Greene, Dalton "D Smitty" Smith	3:56
9.	"Don't Ask, Don't Tell"	Michael Bell, Jerome Perkins, Willie Stephens	4:01
10.	"Happily Ever After"	C-Ray, Marc Williams	3:44
11.	"Lay You Down"	Jerome Perkins, Serlatheo Quinlan, Mike Smoov	5:13
12.	"Now That It's Over (Outro)"	Earl R. Johnson, Jr., Marc Williams	1:03

== Credits ==
Adapted from Allmusic and album liner.

- Cedric "K-Ci" Hailey — Primary Artist
- Joel "JoJo" Hailey — Primary Artist
- Damon Jones — Executive Producer
- Roger "Mista Raja" Greene — Composer, Executive Producer, Producer
- Logan Alexander — Photography
- Yusef "Sef Millz" Alexander — Composer, Producer
- David Alford — Composer, Producer
- Sherrod Barnes — Bass, Guitar
- Michael Bell — Composer
- Danielle Brimm — A&R, Producer
- Devon L. Bryce — Composer
- C-Ray — Composer, Producer
- Trevin "Big Trev" Clark — Composer, Producer
- Bekah Connolly — A&R
- Shawnte Crespo — Product Manager
- Cylla — Programming
- James Earl Davis — Composer
- Eric Fernandez — Engineer, Producer
- Paul Grosso — Creative Director
- Phelippe Herrera — Composer
- Paul Irvin — Composer
- Eric Jackson — Composer
- Earl R. Johnson, Jr. — Composer, Producer
- Jordan Lewis — Additional Production, Composer, Keyboards
- Sean Marlowe — Art Direction, Design
- Carlett Martin — Composer
- Giovanna Melchiorre — Publicity
- Arnold Mischkulnig — Mastering, Mixing
- Debra Mitchell-Adams — Composer
- Jerome Perkins — Composer
- Preach — engineer
- Serlatheo Quinlan — Composer, Producer
- Dalton "D Smitty" Smith — Composer, Producer
- Mike Smoov — Composer
- Willie Stephens — Composer
- Hanif Sumner — Publicity
- P.L. Sweets — Producer
- Ayinde Thomas — Composer, Producer
- Dontay Thompson — Promoter
- Prentiss Thompson — Composer
- Corey Tunnessen — Engineer, Mixing
- Maurice White — Promoter
- Marc Williams — Composer, Engineer, Producer, Vocal Producer

== Weekly charts ==
Chart (2013)	Peak position
US Billboard 200	77
US Top R&B/Hip-Hop Albums (Billboard)	20
