= All My Life (K-Ci & JoJo song) =

1998 single by K-Ci & JoJo

- Artwork for original release (U.S. CD single pictured)

Single by K-Ci & JoJo

from the album Love Always
- B-side: "Don't Rush (Take Love Slowly)"; "Tell Me It's Real"
- Released: March 17, 1998
- Recorded: 1997
- Studio: Audio Achievements (Torrance, California, U.S.)
- Genre: R&B; soul
- Length: 5:30 (album version); 3:39 (radio edit)
- Label: MCA
- Songwriters: Joel Hailey; Rory Bennett
- Producers: K-Ci & JoJo

K-Ci & JoJo singles chronology
"Last Night's Letter" (1997)	"All My Life" (1998)	"Don't Rush (Take Love Slowly)" (1998)

Music video
- "All My Life on YouTube

"All My Life" is a song recorded by American R&B duo K-Ci & JoJo. The song was written by Joel "JoJo" Hailey and Rory Bennett and produced by K-Ci & JoJo for the duo’s debut studio album, Love Always (1997). The song was released to airplay in January 1998 and was released physically on March 17, 1998, as the third single from the album through MCA Records. "All My Life" is an R&B and soul song. Music critics have claimed this as the duo's most successful song of their career; it was nominated at the 41st Annual Grammy Awards for Best R&B Vocal Performance and Best R&B Song.

"All My Life" was a commercial success, topping the US Billboard Hot 100 for three consecutive weeks. It was certified gold in the US and was the duo's longest-running number-one single of their career. "All My Life" performed well internationally, peaking at number one in Australia, the Netherlands, and New Zealand and entering the top 10 in eight other countries. It achieved platinum status in Australia, New Zealand, and the United Kingdom.

== Background and writing ==
"The song was originally supposed to be used for another artist, a female artist on A&M Records. But we listened to it after we got out of the studio and it was like, 'I'm keeping this, this is too hot.'"

— JoJo

In 1997, K-Ci & JoJo traveled to various recording studios in California and New York with multiple relatively unknown record producers for recording of their debut album, Love Always. JoJo Hailey wrote the song; he initially started with the melody, and the lyrics came from words his daughter said that inspired JoJo in the studio, which also suited the melody. He originally made it for a female artist on A&M Records, but ultimately he decided to keep the song. "All My Life" was recorded at Audio Achievements in Torrance, California. Rory Bennett contributed on the song by helping the writing and the production.

== Music and theme ==
"All My Life" is a slow-tempo love song and ballad, performed in slow groove. It is composed in the key of D♭ major and is set to 63 beats per minute in the time signature of common time. "All My Life" has been classified as an R&B and soul song.

== Release and reception ==
"All My Life" was released as the third single from the album Love Always. The song was released in the United States on March 17, 1998, as a CD single. It was released on March 30, 1998, in Germany as a maxi single. "Don't Rush (Take Love Slowly)" was included as the B-side on all copies. In many European countries, "All My Life" was released as a maxi single without a B-side, but contained a radio edit as well as two remixes. On September 18, 2001, "All My Life" would be available to download digitally via the iTunes Store, but "Tell Me It's Real" was included instead of "Don't Rush".

The song was praised by music critics, who classify it as the duo's most successful song. Steve Heuy of AllMusic calls "All My Life" a "sweet ballad" and claims the song "broke them big". Billboard magazine writer Aliya King wrote "All My Life" "cemented the duo's reputation as sensitive and soulful crooners." Gerald Martinez from New Sunday Times described it as "scintillating", noting that it "features some stunning vocal arrangements." Ralph Tee from the Record Mirror Dance Update gave the song four out of five, adding, "The two Jodeci boys thrill with this urban beat ballad, strings and plonky piano intro making it a real show-stopping performance piece. Rich with the duo's own harmonies, it's one of those records you can really grow into."

== Chart performance ==
The single debuted on the US Billboard Hot 100 at number 15. It reached the chart's top spot the following week. The song stayed on the Hot 100 for 35 weeks. "All My Life" achieved success on other Billboard charts, including the Hot R&B Singles chart, peaking at number one, the Rhythmic Top 40 chart, peaking at number one, and the Adult Contemporary chart, peaking at number 26. It would also rank at number 98 on Billboard's Hot 100 decade-end chart.

Internationally, "All My Life" peaked inside the top 10 on multiple charts. It peaked at number two on the Australian ARIA Singles Chart and was certified platinum by the Australian Recording Industry Association (ARIA) for shipments of 70,000 units in Australia. The song also peaked at number four on the Swedish Hitlistan chart and was certified gold by the International Federation of the Phonographic Industry (IFPI). "All My Life" also peaked at number 12 in Austria, number three in Flanders, number 11 in Wallonia, number 43 in France, number one in the Netherlands and New Zealand, number two in Norway, number four in Switzerland, and number eight in the United Kingdom.

== Accolades ==
"All My Life" was nominated for multiple awards. At the 41st Grammy Awards in 1999, "All My Life" was nominated for Best R&B Vocal Performance and Best R&B Song. The music video for the song was nominated for Best R&B Video at the 1998 MTV Video Music Awards, losing to Wyclef Jean's "Gone till November".

== Music video ==
The song's accompanying music video was directed by Lara M. Schwartz. It begins by showing many of the people in the crowd, followed by a pianist playing the introduction. It eventually pans over K-Ci & JoJo as they begin singing into their microphones. Every so often, an outside scene of love will show up. Examples are of a teacher helping a student read, parents with a newborn baby, a woman giving a homeless man food, a lesbian couple laying in bed and talking, and a father with his daughter. In between these scenes, the camera pans over the stage, as well as the people in the crowd and the musicians. At the end, the camera shows a sunset and pans away.

== Track listings ==
12-inch maxi single

1. "All My Life" (Radio Edit) – 3:42
2. "All My Life" (Album Version) – 5:31
3. "All My Life" (Ignorants Remix) – 4:54
4. "All My Life" (The Utopia Redd Remix) – 4:26

Digital download

1. "All My Life" – 5:32
2. "All My Life" (The Utopia Redd Remix) – 4:28
3. "Tell Me It's Real" – 4:41
4. "Tell Me It's Real" (Dave Jam Hall) – 3:50

Curtis Moore remix

1. "All My Life" (Curtis & Moore Club Mix) – 6:34
2. "All My Life" (Curtis & Moore Instrumental) – 6:34

France 12-inch maxi single

1. "All My Life" (Radio Edit) – 3:42
2. "All My Life" (Album Version) – 5:31

== Charts ==
=== Weekly charts ===
Chart (1998–1999)	Peak position
Australia (ARIA)	1
Austria (Ö3 Austria Top 40)	12
Belgium (Ultratop 50 Flanders)	3
Belgium (Ultratop 50 Wallonia)	11
Canada Top Singles (RPM)	8
Canada Adult Contemporary (RPM)	30
Canada Dance/Urban (RPM)	5
Denmark (IFPI)	3
Europe (Eurochart Hot 100)	6
France (SNEP)	43
Germany (GfK)	5
Iceland (Íslenski Listinn Topp 40)	26
Netherlands (Dutch Top 40)	1
Netherlands (Single Top 100)	1
New Zealand (Recorded Music NZ)	1
Norway (VG-lista)	2
Scottish Singles Sales (Official Charts)	30
Sweden (Sverigetopplistan)	4
Switzerland (Schweizer Hitparade)	4
UK Singles (Official Charts)	8
UK Airplay (Music Week)	17
UK Hip Hop/R&B (Official Charts)	2
US Billboard Hot 100	1
US Adult Contemporary (Billboard)	26
US Adult Pop Airplay (Billboard)	35
US Hot R&B/Hip-Hop Songs (Billboard)	1
US Pop Airplay (Billboard)	2
US Rhythmic Airplay (Billboard)	1

=== Year-end charts ===
Chart (1998)	Position
Australia (ARIA)	12
Belgium (Ultratop 50 Flanders)	41
Belgium (Ultratop 50 Wallonia)	69
Canada Top Singles (RPM)	24
Canada Urban (RPM)	49
Europe (Eurochart Hot 100)	36
Germany (Media Control)	35
Netherlands (Dutch Top 40)	11
Netherlands (Single Top 100)	12
New Zealand (RIANZ)	6
Sweden (Hitlistan)	22
Switzerland (Schweizer Hitparade)	39
UK Singles (OCC)	102
US Billboard Hot 100	7
US Adult Top 40 (Billboard)	95
US Hot R&B Songs (Billboard)	8
US Mainstream Top 40 (Billboard)	6
US Rhythmic Top 40 (Billboard)	2

=== Decade-end charts ===
Chart (1990–1999)	Position
Netherlands (Dutch Top 40)	94
US Billboard Hot 100	98

== Certifications and sales ==
Region	Certification	Certified units/sales
Australia (ARIA)	Platinum	70,000^{^}
Netherlands (NVPI)	Gold	50,000^{^}
New Zealand (RMNZ)	Platinum	10,000^{*}
Norway (IFPI Norway)	Gold	
Sweden (GLF)	Gold	15,000^{^}
United Kingdom (BPI)	Platinum	600,000^{‡}
United States (RIAA)	Gold	700,000
^{*} Sales figures based on certification alone.^{^} Shipments figures based on certification alone.^{‡} Sales+streaming figures based on certification alone.

== Release history ==
Region	Date	Format(s)	Label(s)	Ref.
United States	January 13, 1998	Contemporary hit radio	MCA	
United States	March 17, 1998	CD; cassette	MCA	
Germany	March 30, 1998	Maxi-CD	MCA	
United Kingdom	April 6, 1998	12-inch vinyl; CD; cassette	MCA	

== See also ==
- Dutch Top 40 number-one hits of 1998
- List of Hot 100 number-one singles of 1998 (U.S.)
- List of number-one R&B singles of 1998 (U.S.)
- List of number-one singles in Australia during the 1990s
