= Love Always =

Studio album by K-Ci & JoJo
- Released: June 17, 1997
- Recorded: 1996–1997
- Genre: R&B; soul
- Length: 52:04
- Label: MCA
- Producer: Fred Rosser; Jeff Redd; Rory Bennett; Joey Elias; Laney Stewart; Gerald Baillergeau; DeVante Swing; James Mtume; Derrick Garrett; Craig Brockman; Victor Merrit; Jon-John Robinson; Jorge Corante; Andrew Braxton; Bradley Spalter; Mike Smoov; Joel Hailey

K-Ci & JoJo chronology
Love Always (1997)	It's Real (1999)

Singles from Love Always
- 1. "You Bring Me Up" Released: May 27, 1997; 2. "Last Night's Letter" Released: September 16, 1997; 3. "All My Life" Released: March 17, 1998; 4. "Don't Rush (Take Love Slowly)" Released: July 1998

Love Always is the debut album of American R&B duo K-Ci & JoJo, released on June 17, 1997, by MCA Records. It was recorded at various studios in New York and the Los Angeles area in 1996 and 1997. It was produced by JoJo and several others, including DeVante Swing, Jon-John Robinson, James Mtume, and Jeff Redd. The duo were originally a part of Jodeci before this album.

The album peaked at number six on the US Billboard 200 and also appeared on international charts. The single "All My Life" charted number one in multiple countries, and all four of the album's singles peaked above the top 25 in the US Hot R&B/Hip-Hop Songs and the New Zealand Top 40 Singles. Love Always was received favorably by critics, who praised the brothers' singing ability and the production. The album has been certified three times platinum by the Recording Industry Association of America (RIAA) and gold by Music Canada and IFPI Sweden. It had sold more than 3 million copies in the United States.

== Background ==
Previously, K-Ci & JoJo had been members of the group Jodeci, which consisted of them and another pair of brothers, DeVante Swing and Mr. Dalvin. Under Uptown Records, the group released three studio albums certified platinum by the RIAA: Forever My Lady (1991), Diary of a Mad Band (1993), and The Show, the After Party, the Hotel (1995).

Jodeci has been inactive since 1996. K-Ci & JoJo, seeking to shed Jodeci's "bad boy image", began working on other projects. They appeared as featured artists in songs including Tupac Shakur's "How Do U Want It", which topped the Billboard Hot 100 and E-40's Rapper's Ball, which peaked 29th on the Hot 100. They recorded their first songs as a duo, "If You Think You're Lonely Now" and "How Could You", for the soundtrack albums Jason's Lyric and Bulletproof, respectively. Both singles reached the top 20 on Hot R&B/Hip-Hop songs.

== Production, writing, and recording ==
"We wanted to do an album that everyone could listen to. We had this 'bad boy' image, and we're trying to get around that."

— JoJo

JoJo told Ebony that he and K-Ci "wrote 75 percent" of Love Always. The brothers said they wanted to make an album that everyone, including their Christian mother, would be able to listen to. K-Ci told Ebony, "We want to write songs that women can listen to. [...] You can listen to this in the car, riding with the folks." Contrasting the album with the brothers' work with Jodeci, K-Ci told Billboard, "With Jodeci, we might sing 'Freek'n You', and with K-Ci & JoJo, we don't use the word 'sex'".

Love Always was the first album K-Ci & JoJo produced. Referring to DeVante Swing, who produced many of Jodeci's songs, K-Ci told Billboard, "We couldn't just say, 'Oh, DeVante's gonna make sure it's mixed right.' We had to do it." Other contributors to the album included Rory Bennett, James Mtume, Jorge Corante, Mike Smoov, Fred Rosser, Jeff Redd, Joey Wlias, Laney Stewart, Gerald Baillergeau, DeVante Swing, Derrick Garrett, Craig Brockman, Victor Merrit, Jon-John Robinson, Andrew Braxton, and Bradley Spalter. Mike Smoov, Jimi Randolph, Derrick Garrett, Thom Cadley, and Mikael Ifverson engineered the album.

Recording took place in 1996 and 1997 at recording studios in New York and the Los Angeles area:

New York

- ACME Recording Studio in Mamaroneck
- Battery Studios in New York City
- Hit City Studio in Bronx
- Sony Music Studios in New York City
- Sony Recording Studio in New York City
- Sound Track Studio in New York City
- Startrak in New York City

Southern California

- Audio Achievements in Torrance
- Boulevard Recording Studio in Carson
- Classroom Studio in Hollywood
- Tracken Place in Los Angeles
- Tickle Box Studios in Los Angeles
- Westlake Studio in Los Angeles

== Content ==
Love Always is written and performed in the R&B and soul styles. It consists of slow jams and love songs. The album's opening track, "HBI", is a short introduction and is followed by "Last Night's Letter", a slow jam about broken hearts. The next song, "Baby Come Back", was written by K-Ci about his past relationship with singer Mary J. Blige. "Love Ballad" is a cover of the L.T.D. song.

== Release and promotion ==
Love Always was released in the United States and Germany on June 17, 1997, in Canada on June 24, 1997, and in the United Kingdom on March 20, 1999. It was released in Australia in August 1998 packaged with six bonus remixes of "How Could You", "Last Night's Letter", "All My Life", and "You Bring Me Up". The album was released on CD, cassette and LP, except in Australia, where it was only released on CD.

=== Singles ===
Four songs on Love Always became singles. All four appeared in the top 25 on Hot R&B/Hip-Hop Songs and the New Zealand Singles Chart. The first single, "You Bring Me Up", was released on May 27, 1997. It peaked at 26th on the Billboard Hot 100, 15th on R&B/Hip Hop Songs, 15th on the New Zealand Singles Chart, and 21st on the UK Singles Chart. A remix was made featuring Snoop Dogg. The second single, "Last Night's Letter", was released on September 16, 1997. It peaked at 46th on the Hot 100, 15th on Hot R&B/Hip-Hop Songs, and 16th on the New Zealand Singles Chart.

The third single, "All My Life", was released on March 17, 1998. JoJo wrote the song about his daughter but originally intended it for another artist. In an interview with MTV, he said, "The song was originally supposed to be used for… another artist, a female artist on A&M Records. But we listened to it after we got out of the studio and it was like, 'I'm keeping this, this is too hot.'" "All My Life" peaked at number one on the Hot 100 and R&B/Hip-Hop Songs, tying a record set by The Beatles by jumping from 15th to first on the U.S. charts. It was also a number-one song in Australia, the Netherlands, and New Zealand. It peaked at second on the Norwegian Singles Chart, third on the Flanders Belgium Singles Chart, fourth on the Swedish Singles Chart and the Swiss Singles Chart, eighth on the UK Singles Chart, 11th on the Wallonia Belgium Singles Chart, 12th on the Austrian Singles Chart, and 43rd on the French Singles Chart. It was certified platinum by the Australian Recording Industry Association and gold by IFPI Sweden. "All My Life" was nominated for Best R&B Video at the 1999 MTV Video Music Awards.

The fourth and final single, "Don't Rush (Take Love Slowly)", was originally the B-side to "All My Life"; it was released as a single in July 1998 after it achieved more airplay than "All My Life". It peaked at 24th on the US Rhythmic Top 40, 46th on Hot R&B Airplay, 16th on the UK Singles Chart, 25th on the Dutch Singles Charts, and 26th on the New Zealand Singles Chart.

== Reception ==
=== Commercial performance ===
The album debuted at 24th on the US Billboard 200, and went on to peak at sixth. It peaked at second on the Billboard Top R&B/Hip-Hop Albums. On July 9, 1998, Love Always was certified three times platinum by the RIAA, for shipments of three million copies in the United States. It spent 90 weeks on the Billboard 200 and 91 weeks on the R&B/Hip-Hop Albums. As of June 1999, Love Always had sold 2.9 million copies in the US, according to Nielsen SoundScan.

Love Always charted internationally, as well. It peaked at 26th in Canada, and on June 30, 1998, it was certified platinum by Music Canada, for shipments of 100,000 copies in Canada. In Australia, the album debuted at 44th, before peaking the next week at 37th. In 1998, Love Always was certified gold by the Australian Recording Industry Association (ARIA), for shipments of 35,000 copies in Australia. It peaked at fifth in New Zealand, 19th in the Netherlands, 28th in Switzerland, 51st in the UK, and 56th in Sweden.

=== Critical response ===
Professional ratings
Review scores
Source	Rating
AllMusic	3.5/5 stars
USA Today	2.5/4 stars

Love Always has received favorable reviews from music critics. Alex Henderson of AllMusic called "Love Ballad" the "best thing the Hailey brothers have ever done – inside or outside of Jodeci". Henderson called the album's ballads and slow jams "above average" and noted a lack of new jack swing and R-rated lyrics of the sort he had observed in Jodeci's music. He liked the songs "Now and Forever", "Still Waiting", and "Baby Come Back" and appreciated the 1970s soul music feel.

Vibe magazine's Michael Gonzalez gave the album a favorable review, writing, "Love Always is a marvelous musical testament to black love in the '90s." He enjoyed the production, especially from Rory Bennett, and compared the duo to Frankie Lymon. He noticed K-Ci's lyrics in "Baby Come Back" were about his relationship with Mary J. Blige stating "[K-Ci] wails like a man driven crazy by his missteps." Gonzalez also liked the songs "Don't Rush (Take Love Slowly)", and "You Bring Me Up".

== Track listing ==
Credits adapted from the album's liner notes.

No.	Title	Lyrics	Music	Producer(s)	Length
1.	"HBI (Hailey Brother's Intro)"	Joel "JoJo" Hailey; Cedric "K-Ci" Hailey	JoJo Hailey; Michael Bell; Craig Brockman	JoJo Hailey; Mike Smoov	1:52
2.	"Last Night's Letter"	C. Hailey; Gloria Stewart	Laney Stewart	Laney Stewart	4:38
3.	"Baby Come Back"	C. Hailey; J. Hailey	Andrew Braxton; Derrick Garrett; Fred Rosser; Mel Larson; Jerry Marcellino; Gene Marcellino	Derrick Garrett; Jeff Redd; Andrew Braxton^{[b]}; Fred Rosser^{[b]}	4:16
4.	"Just for Your Love"	G. Stewart; C. Hailey; J. Hailey	Genard Parker	Gerard "GetnPayd" Parker	5:08
5.	"Now and Forever"	Bradley Spalter	Robbie Nevil; Emanuel Officer	Bradley Spalter; Emanuel Officer	4:38
6.	"Don't Rush (Take Love Slowly)"	J. Hailey; C. Hailey	Rory Bennett	Rory Bennett; J. Hailey	3:13
7.	"You Bring Me Up"	C. Hailey; J. Hailey	Gerald Baillergeau; Victor Merritt	Gerald "Big Yam" Baillergeau; Victor Merritt	4:23
8.	"Still Waiting"	DeVante Swing; J. Hailey	DeVante Swing	DeVante Swing; J. Hailey^{[a]}	4:54
9.	"Love Ballad"	Skip Scarborough	Skip Scarborough	James Mtume	3:54
10.	"How Many Times (Will You Let Him Break Your Heart)"	Kenneth "Babyface" Edmonds; Officer	Jorge "G. Man" Corante	Jorge "G. Man" Corante; Officer	4:41
11.	"All My Life"	J. Hailey	Bennett; J. Hailey	J. Hailey; Bennett	5:31
12.	"How Could You"	Jon-John Robinson; G. Stewart; Joey Elias	Jon-John Robinson; G. Stewart; Joey Elias	Jon-John Robinson; Joey Elias^{[a]}	4:57

Australia bonus tracks
No.	Title	Length
13.	"How Could You" (International Edit)	3:59
14.	"How Could You" (Pop Mix)	4:13
15.	"Last Night's Letter" (So So Def Remix)	4:10
16.	"All My Life" (Wedding Remix)	4:27
17.	"All My Life" (Curtis Moore Remix)	6:35
18.	"You Bring Me Up" (Midnight Mix)	4:18

Notes

- ^{^[a]} signifies a co-producer
- ^{^[b]} signifies an additional producer

Sample credits

- "Baby Come Back" contains a sample of "Whatever You Got I Want", written by Mel Larson, Jerry Marcellino, and Gene Marcellino, as performed by The Jackson 5.

== Personnel ==
Credits for Love Always adapted from album's liner notes.

- Cedric "K-Ci" Hailey – lead and background vocals (tracks 1–10, 12), vocal arrangement (tracks 3, 6), executive producer
- Joel "JoJo" Hailey – lead and background vocals (tracks 1–8, 10–12), producer (tracks 1, 6, 11), co-producer (track 8), vocal arrangement (tracks 3, 6), executive producer

=== Musicians ===
- Richard Adcock – cello (track 12)
- Anas Allaf – guitar (tracks 6, 10), electric guitar (track 11)
- Robert Becker – viola (track 12)
- Rory Bennett – instrumentation (tracks 6, 11)
- Charlie Bisharat – violin (track 12)
- Andrew Braxton – keyboards (track 3)
- Darius Campo – violin (track 12)
- Jorge "G. Man" Corante – keyboards and programming (track 10)
- Makeda Davis – background vocals (track 8)
- Basil Fearrington – bass (track 9)
- Juliann French – violin (track 12)
- Rob Fusari – additional programming (track 4)
- Berj Garabedian – violin (track 12)
- Garth Gayle – guitar (track 4)
- Harris Goldman – violin (track 12)
- Endre Granat – violin (track 12)
- Mimi Granat – viola (track 12)
- Reggie Griffith – guitar (track 12)
- Alan Grubfeld – violin (track 12)
- Reggie Hamilton – bass (track 12)
- Paula Hochhalter – cello (track 12)
- Norman Hughes – violin (track 12)
- Peter Kent – violin (track 12)
- Razdan Kuyumjian – violin (track 12)
- Ennis Melchan – violin (track 12)
- Ed "Tree" Moore – guitar (track 9)
- James Mtume – keyboards (track 9)
- Jim Mussien – drums (track 9)
- Derek Nakamoto – strings and arrangement (track 10)
- Robbie Nevil – guitar (track 5)
- Emanuel Officer – vocal arrangement (track 5), background vocals (track 10)
- Genard Parker – keyboards and drums (track 4)
- Dunn Pearson – keyboards (track 9)
- Kizi Pitfika – viola (track 12)
- Barbara Porter – violin (track 12)
- Steve Richards – cello (track 12)
- Jon-John Robinson – drums and piano (track 12)
- Anatoly Rosinsky – violin (track 12)
- Fred Rosser – drums (track 3)
- Bob Sanov – violin (track 12)
- Peter "Ski" Schwartz – strings (track 9)
- Sheila E. – percussion (track 12)
- Bradley Spalter – keyboards and programming (track 5)
- Laney Stewart – instrumentation (track 2)
- Raymond Tischer – viola (track 12)
- Randy Waldman – strings arrangement and conducting (track 11)
- Ken Yerke – violin (track 12)

=== Production ===
- Steve B. – assistant engineer (track 3)
- Gerald Baillergeau – producer, engineer, and mixing (track 7)
- Rory Bennett – producer (tracks 6, 11)
- Kyle Bess – assistant mix engineer (track 10)
- Allen Bishop – engineer (track 4)
- Stuart Brawley – assistant mix engineer (track 2)
- Andrew Braxton – additional production (track 3)
- Craig Brockman – co-producer (track 1)
- Thom Cadley – engineer (tracks 3, 4)
- Bill Carr – assistant engineer (track 6)
- Cecil T. Chambers – production coordination (track 2)
- Rob Chiarelli – mixing (tracks 1, 3, 8)
- Jorge "G. Man" Corante – producer (track 10)
- Tom Coyne – mastering (all tracks)
- Martin Czembor – assistant mix engineer (track 4)
- Kevin "KD" Davis – mixing (track 2)
- Joey Elias – co-producer (track 12)
- Derrick Garrett – producer and engineer (track 3)
- Jon Gass – mixing (tracks 5, 10)
- Bryan Golder – assistant engineer (track 6)
- Chris Habeck – Pro Tools transfer (track 4)
- Mikael Ifversen – engineer (track 3)
- Mauricio Iragorri – assistant mix engineer (track 12)
- Damon Jones – executive producer
- Adam Kagen – engineer (track 5)
- Adam Kudzin – mixing (track 4)
- Ernie Lake – engineer (track 4)
- Tommy Lockheart – assistant Pro Tools transfer (track 4)
- Charity Lomax – assistant engineer (tracks 6, 10, 11)
- Manny Marroquin – engineer (track 12)
- Victor Merrit – producer, engineer, and mixing (track 7)
- James Mtume – producer and engineer (track 9)
- Greg Mull – engineer (tracks 6, 10, 11)
- Rene Ochoa – project coordinator (track 10)
- Emanuel Officer – producer (tracks 5, 10)
- Genard Parker – producer and mixing (track 4)
- Kelvin Parker – engineer (track 4)
- David Pelman – engineer (track 10)
- Dave "Hard Drive" Pensado – mixing (tracks 6, 11, 12)
- Jimi Randolph – engineer (track 2)
- Jeff Redd – producer (track 3), executive producer
- Vince Reynolds – assistant engineer (track 3)
- Jon-John Robinson – producer (track 12)
- Fred Rosser – additional production (track 3)
- Mike Scielzi – engineer (track 8)
- Matt Silva – assistant mix engineer (track 11)
- Mike Smoov – producer and engineer (track 1)
- Bradley Spalter – producer (track 5)
- Laney Stewart – producer (track 2)
- DeVante Swing – producer and engineer (track 8)
- Tom Vercillo – mixing (track 9)
- Brian Vibberts – assistant engineer (tracks 3, 4)
- Eric White – assistant engineer (track 6)
- Jeffrey "Woody" Woodruff – engineer (track 11)

== Charts ==
=== Weekly charts ===
Chart (1997)	Peak position
Canada Top CD/Albums (RPM)	54
Dutch Albums (MegaCharts)	45
UK Albums (The Official Charts Company)	64
US Billboard 200	24
R&B/Hip-Hop Albums (Billboard)	9

Chart (1998)	Peak position
Australian Albums (ARIA)	37
Canada Top CD/Albums (RPM)	26
Dutch Albums (MegaCharts)	19
New Zealand Albums (RIANZ)	5
Swedish Albums (Sverigetopplistan)	28
Swiss Albums (Swiss Music Charts)	28
UK Albums (The Official Charts Company)	51
US Billboard 200	6
US R&B/Hip-Hop Albums (Billboard)	2

Chart (1999)	Peak position
US Billboard 200	146
US R&B/Hip-Hop Albums (Billboard)	68

=== Year-end charts ===
Chart (1997)	Position
US Billboard 200	196
US Top R&B/Hip-Hop Albums (Billboard)	66

Chart (1998)	Position
US Billboard 200	19
US Top R&B/Hip-Hop Albums (Billboard)	15

== Certifications ==
Region	Certification	Certified units/sales
Australia (ARIA)	Gold	35,000^{^}
Canada (Music Canada)	Platinum	100,000^{^}
United States (RIAA)	3× Platinum	3,000,000^{^}
^{^} Shipments figures based on certification alone.

== Release history ==
Region	Release date	Format(s)	Label	Ref.
United States	June 17, 1997	CD, cassette, LP	MCA	
Germany	June 17, 1997	CD, cassette, LP	MCA	
Canada	June 24, 1997	CD, cassette, LP	Universal Music Group	
Australia	August 1998	CD	MCA International	
United Kingdom	March 20, 1999	CD, cassette, LP	Universal / Island	
