= X (K-Ci & JoJo album) =

Studio album by K-Ci & JoJo
- Released: December 5, 2000
- Recorded: 1999–2000
- Genre: R&B
- Length: 59:26
- Label: MCA
- Producer: Emanuel Officer; Joel "JoJo" Hailey; Rory Bennett; Craig Brockman; Tim Owens; Teddy Riley; Darrell "Delite" Allamby; Johnny J; Eric Hernandez; Brian Morgan; Roy "Royalty" Hamilton; Mike Smoov; DeVante Swing; Timbaland; Christopher Troy; Babyface; Ralph Stacy; Rose Griffin; Static Major

K-Ci & JoJo chronology
It's Real (1999)	X (2000)	Emotional (2002)

Singles from X
- 1. "Crazy" Released: March 2, 2001; 2. "Wanna Do You Right" Released: May 15, 2001

X is the third studio album by American R&B duo and brothers K-Ci & JoJo, released December 5, 2000 on MCA. Recording sessions took place during 1999–2000. Production was handled by various producers, including Mike Smoov, Rory Bennett, and DeVante Swing. The album peaked at number twenty on the US Billboard 200. It achieved acceptable international charting and produced two singles that had minor success charting. The lead single "Crazy" would peak at number 11 on the US Billboard Hot 100. Upon its release, X received average reviews from music critics. The album has been certified platinum by the Recording Industry Association of America (RIAA), for shipments of 1,000,000 copies in the United States.

== Critical response ==
Professional ratings
Review scores
Source	Rating
AllMusic	3/5 stars
Rolling Stone	3/5 stars
Vibe	3.5/5 stars

X has received average reviews from music critics.

== Track listing ==
No.	Title	Producer(s)	Length
1.	"Honest Lover"		5:43
2.	"Wanna Do You Right"	Roy "Royalty" Hamilton	4:28
3.	"Get Back"	DeVante Swing	3:42
4.	"Crazy"	Darrell Delite	4:20
5.	"Game Face"	Static Major, Timbaland	3:59
6.	"Thug N U Thug N Me" (featuring 2Pac)	Johnny J	4:02
7.	"If It's Going to Work"		3:27
8.	"All the Things I Should Have Known"	Kenneth "Babyface" Edmonds	5:28
9.	"I Can't Find the Words"		4:10
10.	"Something Inside of Me"		4:33
11.	"One Last Time"		3:59
12.	"Suicide/Slip & Fall"	DeVante Swing, Eric Hernandez	8:09
13.	"Ooh Yeah"		3:26

Bonus tracks
No.	Title	Length
13.	"Slip & Fall"	3:26
14.	"Ooh Yeah"	3:29

Japan bonus tracks
No.	Title	Length
14.	"I Just Can't Leave"	4:49
15.	"Crazy" (remix)	4:06

== Personnel ==
Credits for X adapted from liner notes.

Track	Credits
"Honest Lover"	Rory Bennett – producer, keyboards; Dave Guerrero – assistant engineer; JoJo Hailey – producer, vocals; K-Ci Hailey – vocalist; Damon Jones – executive creative director; Greg Mull – recorder; Dean Parks – acoustic guitar, electric guitar; Dave Pensado – mixer; Jason Rankings – assistant engineer; Randy Waldman – string arrangement; Eric White – digital editor; Woody Woodruff – recorder

== Charts ==
=== Weekly charts ===
Chart (2000–2001)	Peak position
Dutch Albums (Album Top 100)	88
New Zealand Albums (RMNZ)	30
US Billboard 200	20
US Top R&B/Hip-Hop Albums (Billboard)	3

=== Year-end charts ===
Chart (2001)	Position
Canadian R&B Albums (Nielsen SoundScan)	78
US Billboard 200	71
US Top R&B/Hip-Hop Albums (Billboard)	30

== Certifications ==
Region	Certification	Certified units/sales
United States (RIAA)	Platinum	1,000,000^{^}
^{^} Shipments figures based on certification alone.
