= Emotional (K-Ci and JoJo album) =

Studio album by K-Ci & JoJo
- Released: November 26, 2002
- Recorded: 2002
- Studio: Los Angeles, California
- Genre: R&B
- Length: 52:01
- Label: MCA
- Producer: Babyface; Blaq Rose; Craig Brockman; Darrell "Delite" Allamby; DeYon Dobson; Emanuel Officer; LaShawn Daniels; Mike Smoov; Rodney Jerkins; The Underdogs; Tim Owens

K-Ci & JoJo chronology
X (2000)	Emotional (2002)	My Brother's Keeper (2013)

Singles from Emotional
- 1. "It's Me" Released: 2002; 2. "This Very Moment" Released: November 30, 2002

Professional ratings
Review scores
Source	Rating
AllMusic	2.5/5 stars
Rolling Stone	2/5 stars

Emotional is the fourth studio album by American R&B duo K-Ci & JoJo. It was released on November 26, 2002, through MCA Records. Recording sessions took place at K-Ci & JoJo's home in Los Angeles during 2002. Production was handled by Mike Smoov, Blaq Rose, Craig Brockman, Emanuel Officer, Babyface, Darkchild, Darrell "Delite" Allamby, DeYon Dobson, LaShawn Daniels, The Underdogs and Tim Owens.

In the United States, the album peaked at number 61 on the Billboard 200 and number 18 on the Top R&B/Hip-Hop Albums charts. It was supported with two singles: "It's Me" and "This Very Moment". Its second single made it to number 53 on the US Hot R&B/Hip-Hop Songs and was featured in the 2003 movie Deliver Us from Eva.

== Track listing ==
No.	Title	Writer(s)	Producer(s)	Length
1.	"Intro"	Cedric Hailey; Joel Hailey; Michael Bell; Craig Brockman	Mike Smoov	1:48
2.	"This Very Moment"	DeYon Dobson; Timothy Owens	DeYon Dobson; Tim Owens	4:00
3.	"Special"	Roosevelt Griffin; Precious Raquel King	Blaq Rose	3:58
4.	"It's Me"	LaShawn Daniels; Rodney Jerkins; Fred Jerkins III	LaShawn Daniels; Darkchild	3:57
5.	"I Don't Want"	C. Hailey; J. Hailey; Bell	Mike Smoov	4:31
6.	"Say Yes"	C. Hailey; J. Hailey; Brockman; Bell; Terry Stanton	Craig Brockman; Mike Smoov	4:05
7.	"Down for Life"	Kenneth Edmonds	Babyface	4:46
8.	"Goodbye"	Emanuel Officer; Cornelio Austin	Emanuel Officer	3:49
9.	"So Emotional"	Griffin; King; Bell	Blaq Rose; Mike Smoov	4:16
10.	"Love Me Carefully"	Harvey Mason Jr.; Damon Thomas; Andrew Fromm; Howie Dorough	The Underdogs	3:08
11.	"I Don't Mind"	C. Hailey; J. Hailey; Brockman; Bell	Craig Brockman; Mike Smoov	4:35
12.	"How Can I Trust You?"	Lincoln Browder; Darrell Allamby	Darrell "Delite" Allamby	4:58
13.	"How Long"	Stave And Squeak	Emanuel Officer	4:10
Total length:				52:01

Bonus tracks
No.	Title	Length
14.	"Baby Yeah Yeah (Movin' It)" (featuring Mr. Cheeks)
15.	"I Can't Get Enough"

== Personnel ==
- Cedric "K-Ci" Hailey – vocals, executive producer
- Joel "JoJo" Hailey – vocals, executive producer
- DeVere Duckett – backing vocals
- Timothy Owens – backing vocals, producer
- Roosevelt "Blaq Rose" Griffin Jr. – backing vocals, guitar, keyboards, bass, drum programming, producer
- Raymond "Tangaray" Finks – backing vocals
- Kenneth "Babyface" Edmonds – backing vocals, acoustic guitar, keyboards, bass, drum programming, producer
- Emanuel Officer – backing vocals, producer
- Jud Mahoney – additional backing vocals
- Brandi Simpson – backing vocals
- Darrell "Delite" Allamby – backing vocals, keyboards, bass, drums, percussion, programming, producer, recording, mixing
- Lincoln "Link" Browder – backing vocals
- Michael "Mike Smoov" Bell – guitar, keyboards, bass, drum programming, producer
- Michael Ripoll – guitar
- Chris Justice – guitar, percussion, drums, drum programming, recording, engineering
- Michael Thompson – guitar
- Jody Lachmiller – acoustic guitar
- Madukwu Chinwah – electric guitar
- Craig Brockman – keyboards, producer
- Bill Meyers – keyboards
- Jeffrey Freeman – keyboards
- Kim Hansen – keyboards
- Eric Herron – keyboards
- Sekou Bunch – electric bass
- Nathan East – bass
- Steve Harvey – percussion, drum programming
- Harvey Mason – percussion, timpani
- DeYon Dobson – programming, producer
- LaShawn Daniels – producer
- Rodney "Darkchild" Jerkins – producer
- Damon Thomas – producer
- Harvey Mason Jr. – producer
- Tom Muscatine – recording
- Kyle T. Hamilton – recording
- Stuart Brawley – recording
- Paul Boutin – recording
- Dabling Harward – recording
- Dave "Natural Love" Russell – recording
- Paul Osborn – recording, mixing
- Jon Gass – recording, mixing
- Rob Chiarelli – mixing
- Manny Marroquin – mixing
- Jean-Marie Horvat – mixing
- Serban Ghenea – mixing
- Dave Pensado – mixing
- Benjamin Arrindell – mixing
- Bill Wathen – mixing
- Joe Shawn – Pro Tools
- Paul Foley – Pro Tools
- John Hauls – additional Pro Tools
- Tim Roberts – engineering assistant
- Edward Quesada – engineering assistant
- Christian "Tian" Salyer – additional editing
- Ivy Skoff – production coordinator
- Jolie Levine-Aller – production coordinator
- Gene Grimaldi – mastering
- Jeff Redd – executive producer
- Adrian Van Velsen – sequencing
- Manuel J. Donayre – art direction, design
- JP Robinson – design
- Steve Carty – photography

== Charts ==
=== Weekly charts ===
Chart (2002)	Peak position
US Billboard 200	61
US Top R&B/Hip-Hop Albums (Billboard)	18

=== Year-end charts ===
Chart (2003)	Position
US Top R&B/Hip-Hop Albums (Billboard)	97
