= K-Ci & JoJo =

American R&B duo

- Origin: Monroe, North Carolina, U.S.
- Genres: R&B; soul
- Years active: 1996–present
- Labels: MCA; Formula; RPH; EMI; Soda Pop; E1
- Spinoff of: Jodeci
- Members: Cedric "K-Ci" Hailey; Joel "JoJo" Hailey

K-Ci & JoJo are an American R&B duo, consisting of brothers Cedric "K-Ci" Hailey (born September 2, 1969) and Joel "JoJo" Hailey (born June 10, 1971). Natives of Charlotte, North Carolina, they are also the lead singers of the chart-topping R&B group Jodeci with the DeGrate brothers—Donald (better known as DeVante Swing) and Mr. Dalvin. They are best known for their 1998 single "All My Life" which peaked atop the Billboard Hot 100 for three weeks and received three Grammy Award nominations. They also appeared on the Tupac Shakur number one multi-platinum song "How Do U Want It" in 1996, which was nominated for Best Rap Performance by a Duo or Group in 1997. K-Ci & JoJo also achieved mainstream success with the 1999 hit "Tell Me It's Real", which peaked at number two on the Billboard Hot 100. Their 2001 song, "Crazy", was included on the Save the Last Dance soundtrack and peaked at number 11 on the Billboard Hot 100.

K-Ci & JoJo have released five albums. Their debut studio album, Love Always (1997), has been certified triple platinum by the Recording Industry Association of America, and their subsequent albums It's Real and X were both certified platinum.

== History ==
=== 1983–1996: Music beginnings and early work as duo ===
K-Ci & JoJo first gained recognition as members of a family gospel quartet, Little Cedric and the Hailey Singers. The group released 3 albums on the AIR (Atlanta International Records) label: I'm Alright Now in 1983, Jesus Saves which hit number 4 on the Billboard Gospel chart in 1984 and God's Blessings which hit number 22 in 1985. They joined brothers Donald "DeVanté Swing" DeGrate and Dalvin "Mr. Dalvin" DeGrate to form the R&B group Jodeci in 1988. K-Ci & JoJo's first sign of independence came in 1992 when K-Ci recorded the duet "I Don’t Want to Do Anything" with Mary J. Blige on her debut album What's the 411?. K-Ci also covered Bobby Womack's "If You Think You're Lonely Now" for the movie Jason's Lyric in 1994. Early in 1996, K-Ci & JoJo teamed up for the song "How Could You" for the movie Bulletproof starring Damon Wayans and Adam Sandler. By July 1996, K-Ci & JoJo were featured guest artists in 2Pac's number-one R&B and Billboard Hot 100 hit "How Do U Want It". They are also featured in the 1996 2Pac song "Toss It Up".

=== 1996–1998: Love Always ===
From 1996 to 1997, the brothers made their side projects into a full album, Love Always. Released on June 17, 1997, the album spawned two top-ten R&B hits: "You Bring Me Up" (Pop No. 26) and "Last Night's Letter" (Pop No. 46). The minor success of those singles, however, paled in comparison to the success of the album's third single, "All My Life" (which was dedicated to JoJo's daughter). A supple, lush ballad far removed from the Jodeci material of the early 1990s, "All My Life" was the number-one song on the Hot 100 for three weeks, a feat that K-Ci & JoJo had never achieved with Jodeci. While future singles and albums would be crafted in the vein of "All My Life", it remains the duo's only number-one hit and by far the song they are most widely known for, even amongst non-fans due to its frequent use in film and television. Love Always went on to sell four million copies, and the success of the album put Jodeci's reunion on hold indefinitely. During the recording of Love Always they also appeared in the song "I Care 'Bout You" as a member of the R&B supergroup Milestone, along with Melvin and Kevon Edmonds (of the group After 7) and their brother Babyface, which appeared on the soundtrack for the movie Soul Food that was written and produced by Babyface himself, which he also wrote and produced.

In 1998, K-Ci & JoJo recorded the song "Money Can't Buy You Love," which was produced for the film The Players Club.

In 1999, K-Ci & JoJo recorded "Life", which was written and produced by R. Kelly, for the soundtrack to the Eddie Murphy and Martin Lawrence movie Life.

=== 1999: It's Real ===
K-Ci & JoJo's second studio album, It's Real was released on June 22, 1999. It peaked at number eight on the Billboard 200, peaked at number two on the R&B/Hip Hop Albums, and was certified platinum by the RIAA. Outside of the US, the album reached top 20 on the Dutch Mega Album Top 100, the Canadian Albums Chart, and appeared on the New Zealand Top 40 Albums and the ARIA Charts. The album spawned four singles, including "Tell Me It's Real", which peaked at No. 2 on the Billboard Hot 100, and was a smash hit.

It's Real received a three star rating from AllMusic.

=== 2000: X ===
K-Ci & JoJo returned with X on December 5, 2000. X, the Roman numeral for ten, was picked as the album title to celebrate the Haileys' tenth anniversary in the music business. They made a strong return to the Billboard Hot 100 early in 2001 with the song "Crazy", also included on the Save the Last Dance soundtrack. "Crazy" peaked at number eleven on the Billboard Hot 100. The album also features a hidden Jodeci track entitled "Slip And Fall". Other tracks included "Honest Lover," "One Last Time," and "All the Things I Should Have Known" which Vibe magazine considered "convey a similar mix of hip hop collective that launched Del the Funky Homosapien."

=== 2002–2008: Emotional and other projects ===
The fourth K-Ci & JoJo album, Emotional, was released on November 26, 2002, but did not find commercial success. The CD consisted of two singles, "This Very Moment." and the Rodney "Dark Child" Jerkins produced "It's Me". The album contained their personal favorite "How Long" written by Steve Vaughn and Jojo Hailey.

In late 2006, K-Ci released his debut solo album entitled My Book. K-Ci & JoJo released a greatest hits album on February 8, 2005. On February 6, 2008, they released their fifth compilation album called Love, which was released only in Japan.

=== 2013–present: My Brother's Keeper ===
In 2010, they signed an exclusive deal with R&B crooner Kenneth "Babyface" Edmonds' upstart Soda Pop Records, distributed through E1 Music. On June 25, 2013, they released their new single, "Knock It Off" via iTunes through E1 Music. On September 30, 2013, My Brother's Keeper, was released.

== Media ==
In 2010, TV One aired the reality docu-series, K-Ci & JoJo... Come Clean, which featured Cedric "K-Ci" and Joel "JoJo" Hailey, lead singers of Jodeci. The series showcased the brothers’ struggles with alcohol, as they worked to rebuild their relationship and make a comeback. K-Ci & JoJo... Come Clean, was produced by John Doe Media, with Carl Craig and D. Renard Young serving as executive producers. The series only aired for one season, but still runs several times a year.

== Legal issues ==
In 2001, K-Ci pleaded no contest to four charges of lewd conduct. He had been charged with 24 counts of lewd conduct and indecent exposure following an incident during the December 16, 2000, Jingle Ball concert at L.A.'s Shrine Auditorium during which the singer exposed his genitals twice to the crowd while performing.

== Discography ==
Studio albums

- Love Always (1997)
- It's Real (1999)
- X (2000)
- Emotional (2002)
- My Brother's Keeper (2013)

== Awards and nominations ==
=== American Music Awards ===
Year	Nominee / work	Award	Result
1999	K-Ci & JoJo	Favorite R&B Band/Duo/Group	Won
2000	K-Ci & JoJo	Favorite R&B Band/Duo/Group	Nominated

=== Blockbuster Awards ===
Year	Nominee / work	Award	Result
1999	K-Ci & JoJo	Best Group – R&B	Won

=== Grammy Awards ===
Year	Nominee / work	Award	Result
1997	"How Do U Want It"	Best Rap Performance by a Duo or Group	Nominated
1999	"All My Life"	Best R&B Performance by a Duo or Group with Vocals	Nominated
1999	"All My Life"	Best R&B Song	Nominated

=== MTV Video Music Awards ===
Year	Nominee / work	Award	Result
1998	"All My Life"	Best R&B Video	Nominated
2001	"Crazy"	Best Video from a Film	Nominated

=== NAACP Awards ===
Year	Nominee / work	Award	Result
1999	K-Ci & JoJo	Outstanding Duo or Group	Nominated

=== Soul Train Awards ===
Year	Nominee / work	Award	Result
1999	"All My Life"	Best R&B/Soul Single, Group, Band or Duo	Nominated
