= Damon Wimbley =

American rapper (born 1966)

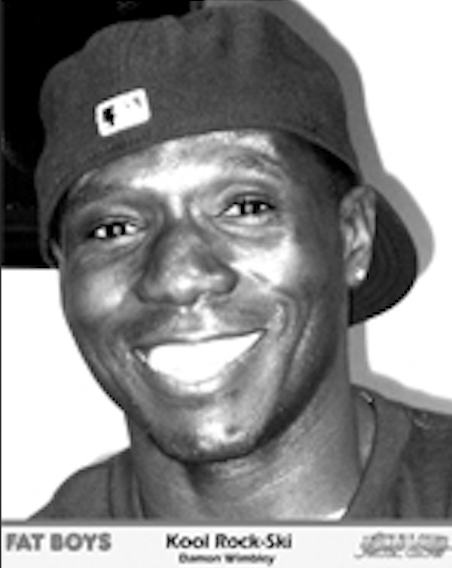

Background information
- Also known as: Kool Rock-Ski
- Born: Damon Yul Wimbley; November 9, 1966 (age 59); Brooklyn, New York, U.S.
- Genres: Hip hop, electro funk
- Years active: 1982–present
- Labels: Kama Sutra Records, Tin Pan Apple, Polydor, PolyGram Records

Damon Yul Wimbley (born November 9, 1966), known professionally as Kool Rock-Ski, is an American rapper, songwriter, actor, and former member of the American hip hop trio Fat Boys as well as the sole surviving member.

== Early life and career ==
Damon Wimbley was born on November 9, 1966, in Brooklyn, New York, NY. In his early teens, he met two kids who would become his musical collaborators, Darren Robinson and Mark Anthony Morales. His career began in the early 1980s alongside Robinson and Morales, the trio establishing themselves initially as The Disco 3. After participating in and winning a contest called The Tin Pan Apple After Dark Dance & Rap Contest, put on in 1983 by Swiss producer Charles Stettler, culminating in a performance at Radio City Music Hall, the group quickly rose to fame. Wimbley was only 16 when The Fat Boys gained mass popularity, going on an international tour organized by their then-manager Charles Stettler, the same person who had organized the Tin Pan Apple After Dark Dance & Rap Contest.

== Later career ==
By 1984, the Fat Boys had participated in national marketing campaigns and had been featured in several movies, the trio’s first role being in the 1985 musical comedy-drama Krush Groove. About that experience, Wimbley says "Krush Groove had things in there that were hot for a while, [but] it was about showing off the culture. It had to work and lay down the foundation [for how] hip-hop can be what it is today. With rap you have two to three months to have a good record—then they go to the next one. [But] our place in hip-hop history [still] isn’t recognized."

By the mid-to-late 1980s, the group had begun releasing covers of surf-rock songs that had been popular in the 1950s and 1960s, their cover of the surf-rock classic "Wipeout" becoming a top 20 hit. Two years after the release of “Wipeout,” Robinson left The Fat Boys to pursue a solo career. The Fat Boys went on to release one more record, Mack Daddy, in 1991.

Wimbley is still active on social media, and regularly posts about the Fat Boys, and also produces Fat Boys merchandise which he promotes via Instagram. He has been featured on multiple records, collaborating with New York rappers City the Great and Kokane in 2022. He is also the host of the annual Classic Hip-Hop and R&B Cookout in New York City, which began in the summer of 2021. As of 2026, Wimbley is the only living member of The Fat Boys.

== Discography ==
=== With The Fat Boys ===
- Fat Boys (1984)
- The Fat Boys Are Back (1985)
- Big & Beautiful (1986)
- Crushin' (1987)
- Coming Back Hard Again (1988)
- On and On (1989)
- Mack Daddy (1991)

=== Featured on ===
- Respectfully Yours by City the Great (2022)
- The Wordsmith by City the Great (2022)
- Hush by Kokane (2022)

== Filmography ==
- Krush Groove (1985)
- Knights of the City (1986)
- Disorderlies (1987)
