= The Fat Boys Are Back =

Studio album by Fat Boys
- Released: June 1, 1985
- Recorded: 1985
- Genre: Hip hop
- Length: 43:47
- Label: Sutra
- Producer: Kurtis Blow

Fat Boys chronology
Fat Boys (1984)	The Fat Boys Are Back (1985)	Big & Beautiful (1986)

Singles from Fat Boys Are Back
- 1. "Fat Boys Are Back" Released: 1985; 2. "Hard Core Reggae" Released: 1985; 3. "Don't Be Stupid" Released: 1985

Professional ratings
Review scores
Source	Rating
AllMusic	3/5 stars
Robert Christgau	C+
(The New) Rolling Stone Album Guide	3.5/5 stars

The Fat Boys Are Back is the second studio album by American hip hop group Fat Boys. It was released on June 1, 1985, via Sutra Records. The album was produced by Kurtis Blow.

In the United States, the album peaked at number 63 on the Top Pop Albums and number 11 on the Top Black Albums charts. It was certified gold by the Recording Industry Association of America on January 9, 1986 for selling 500,000 copies in the US alone. All the three singles off of the album —"The Fat Boys Are Back", "Hard Core Reggae" and "Don't Be Stupid"— made it to the US Hot R&B/Hip-Hop Songs chart, reaching No. 27, 52 and 62, respectively. The song "Pump It Up" was performed in the film Krush Groove during the Disco Fever scene.

== Track listing ==
No.	Title	Writer(s)	Length
1.	"The Fat Boys Are Back"	Damon Wimbley; Darren Robinson; Mark Morales; Kurtis Walker	6:10
2.	"Don't Be Stupid"	Walker	5:40
3.	"Human Beat Box, Pt. 2"	Wimbley; Robinson; Morales	3:16
4.	"Yes, Yes, Y'All"	Wimbley; Robinson; Morales; Walker	5:16
5.	"Hard Core Reggae"	Wimbley; Robinson; Morales; Walker; David Reeves	5:58
6.	"Pump It Up"	Wimbley; Robinson; Morales; Walker; Reeves	6:25
7.	"Fat Boys Scratch"	Wimbley	5:02
8.	"Rock-n-Roll"	Wimbley; Robinson; Morales; Walker; Danny Harris	6:00
Total length:			43:47

== Personnel ==
- Damon "Kool Rock-Ski" Wimbley — vocals
- Mark "Prince Markie Dee" Morales — vocals
- Darren "Buff Love" Robinson — vocals
- Alyson Williams — backing vocals (track 1)
- Fonda Rae — backing vocals (track 1)
- Michelle Cobbs — backing vocals (track 1)
- Kurtis Blow — backing vocals (track 6), producer, mixing
- David "Davy DMX" Reeves — backing vocals (track 6)
- Danny Harris — backing vocals (track 6)
- Larry Green Jr. — backing vocals (track 6)
- Dave Ogrin — mixing
- Art Kass — executive producer
- Charles Stettler — executive producer
- Lynda West — design
- Raeanne Rubenstein — photography
- Tom Coyne — lacquer cut

== Charts ==
Chart (1985)	Peak position
US Billboard 200	63
US Top R&B/Hip-Hop Albums (Billboard)	11

== Certifications ==
Region	Certification	Certified units/sales
United States (RIAA)	Gold	500,000^{^}
^{^} Shipments figures based on certification alone.
