= On and On (Fat Boys album) =

Studio album by Fat Boys
- Released: 1989
- Genre: Rap
- Length: 53:15
- Label: Tin Pan Apple/Mercury/PolyGram
- Producer: Fat Boys

Fat Boys chronology
Coming Back Hard Again (1988)	On and On (1989)	Mack Daddy (1991)

On and On is the sixth album by the American rap trio Fat Boys, released in 1989. They marketed it as the first "rapera". On and On was the trio's final album with Prince Markie Dee.

The album peaked at No. 175 on the Billboard 200. The singles, "Lie-Z" and "Just Loungin'", peaked at Nos. 81 and 86 on Billboard's Hot Black Singles chart. The trio supported the album by performing it in full for a New York City charity event.

== Production ==
The group decided to make a rap opera after watching the movie version of the Who's Tommy. Recorded over three months, On and On was written and produced by the trio; it was the first time they had complete control over the recording of one of their albums. It opens and closes with narration from Doctor Dré and Ed Lover. The songs revolve around Buff "The Human Beat Box" Robinson's breakup with his girlfriend and his adventures with the group while searching for an old flame. Robinson also sings on "Rainy, Rainy", although he intended his vocal version to be a demo. The packaging included a libretto. "It's Getting Hot" is set at the NYC nightclub Palladium. "Lie-Z" compares Robinson's wealth to that of Donald Trump.

== Critical reception ==
Professional ratings
Review scores
Source	Rating
AllMusic	2/5 stars
The Virgin Encyclopedia of Eighties Music	2/5 stars

The Chicago Tribune stated that the "tale is marked variously by playfulness, plenty of bragging and some inspirational study-hard and stop-the-violence messages." Cashbox opined that the trio was influenced by the chart triumphs of DJ Jazzy Jeff & the Fresh Prince and called the album "solid enough to compete." Trouser Press dismissed the album as "a boring display of tired clichés and uninspired performances, with none of the cartoony crew's old panache." Colin Larkin called On and On "a hugely disappointing set" that offered "a lukewarm adaptation of gangsta concerns."

== Track listing ==
All tracks are written by Franklyn Grant, Darren Robinson & Damon Wimbley, except where noted.

No.	Title	Writer(s)	Length
1.	"'Yo' Venture" (featuring Doctor Dré & Ed Lover)	Jimmy Grant	1:01
2.	"Lie-Z"		5:19
3.	"Get Down"		4:56
4.	"T'ings Nah Go So"	Mark Morales /Robinson/ Tiger/ Wimbley	3:54
5.	"School Days"		3:25
6.	"It's Getting Hot"	Albert Cabrera/ Morales/ Robinson/ Wimbley	3:02
7.	"On and On"		4:56
8.	"Just Lougin'"	Franklyn Grant/ Mark Rooney/ Wimbley	3:56
9.	"Knock 'Em Out the Box"	Robinson	3:43
10.	"Braggin'"	Morales/ Rooney/ Wimbley	4:22
11.	"She's Hookin'"		3:19
12.	"Trouble!"		3:08
13.	"If It Ain't One Thing It's Anuddah (Bruddah)"	Morales/ Rooney	3:21
14.	"Rainy, Rainy"	Clifford Branch/ Franklyn Grant	4:13
15.	"After (Words!)" (featuring Doctor Dré & Ed Lover)	Jimmy Glenn	0:41
Total length:			53:15
