= Are You Ready for Freddy =

Single by the Fat Boys

from the album Coming Back Hard Again
- Released: March 18, 1988
- Genre: Rap, horrorcore
- Length: 3:34
- Label: Tin Pan Apple; Mercury
- Songwriter: Donald Lamont

The Fat Boys singles chronology
"The Twist" (1988)	"Are You Ready for Freddy" (1988)	"Louie Louie" (1988)

"Are You Ready for Freddy" is a song by American hip-hop trio the Fat Boys from their 1988 album Coming Back Hard Again. Portions of the song were rapped by Robert Englund as Freddy Krueger. The song was originally released in 1988 as the theme for A Nightmare on Elm Street 4: The Dream Master.

In the video, Prince Markie Dee's "Uncle Frederick" has died, and his lawyer (Bert Remsen) meets the group outside the Nightmare on Elm Street house. The lawyer informs Markie that he must spend the night inside Uncle Frederick's home to earn his inheritance, so the group enters, and not long after Freddy Krueger appears and begins to chase the band throughout the house, slashing with his claw while stopping to rap.

== Personnel ==
- Prince Markie Dee - vocals
- Kool Rock-Ski - vocals
- Buff Love - vocals
- Robert Englund - guest vocals (as Freddy Krueger)
