= Disorderlies =

1987 film directed by Michael Schultz

- Theatrical release poster
- Directed by: Michael Schultz
- Written by: Mark Feldberg; Mitchell Klebanoff
- Produced by: Michael Schultz; George Jackson; Michael Jaffe
- Starring: The Fat Boys; Ralph Bellamy; Tony Plana; Anthony Geary
- Cinematography: Rolf Kestermann
- Edited by: Ned Humphreys
- Music by: Anne Dudley; J. J. Jeczalik
- Distributed by: Warner Bros. Pictures
- Release date: August 14, 1987 (US)
- Running time: 86 minutes
- Country: United States
- Language: English
- Budget: $5 million
- Box office: $10,348,437

Disorderlies is a 1987 comedy film starring the rap group, The Fat Boys, and Ralph Bellamy. The film was directed by Michael Schultz who previously directed The Fat Boys in Krush Groove.

== Plot summary ==
Winslow Lowry is a no-good, indebted gambler and the nephew of elderly, infirm millionaire Albert Dennison. Winslow seeks to speed up his uncle's demise by hiring three of the most inept orderlies he can possibly find. The trio (played by The Fat Boys Markie, Buffy and Kool) only mean well, however. When they fail to give him his medicine, the ailing Albert becomes re-energized, as it turns out he was heavily overmedicated. In the end, the trio and Albert learn about Winslow's scheme and try to stop him.

== Cast ==
- Mark Morales as Markie
- Darren Robinson as Buffy
- Damon Wimbley as Kool
- Ralph Bellamy as Albert Dennison
- Tony Plana as Miguel
- Anthony Geary as Winslow Lowry
- Marco Rodríguez as Luis Montana
- Troy Beyer as Carla
- Garth Wilton as George the Butler
- Helen Reddy as Happy Socialite
- Sam Chew Jr. as the Doctor
- Ray Parker Jr. as the Pizza Deliveryman
- Robert V. Barron as the Funeral Home Director
- Jo Marie Payton as Kool's Mother
- Don Hood as Sgt. Bledsoe
- Rick Zumwalt as Florida Lie Detector
- Rick Nielsen as Hijacked Car Driver

== Commercial performance ==
The film made more than $10 million at the box office.

== Soundtrack ==
In addition to the score co-composed by Anne Dudley from the Art of Noise, the soundtrack features The Fat Boys performing a cover version of The Beatles' "Baby, You're a Rich Man", as well as other rap, pop and rock tracks. Among the other rock tracks was an outtake from Bon Jovi's sessions for their 1986 Slippery When Wet album called "Edge of a Broken Heart." Although this song was never officially released as a single, it did crack the Top 40 on Billboard's Hot 100 Airplay chart, peaking at number 38.

The soundtrack CD was last issued in 1995 and has since gone out of print.

=== Track listing ===
1. "Baby, You're a Rich Man" – The Fat Boys
2. "I Heard a Rumour" – Bananarama
3. "Disorderly Conduct" – Latin Rascals
4. "Big Money" – Ca$hflow
5. "Don't Treat Me Like This" – Anita
6. "Edge of a Broken Heart" – Bon Jovi
7. "Trying to Dance" – Tom Kimmel
8. "Roller One" – Art of Noise
9. "Fat Off My Back" – Gwen Guthrie
10. "Work Me Down" – Laura Hunter
