= Fat Boys (album) =

Studio album by Fat Boys
- Released: May 29, 1984
- Genre: Hip-hop
- Length: 39:10
- Label: Kama Sutra
- Producers: Kurtis Blow; Larry Smith

Fat Boys chronology
Fat Boys (1984)	The Fat Boys Are Back (1985)

Fat Boys is the debut studio album by American hip-hop group Fat Boys, released on May 29, 1984, by Sutra Records. It was produced by Kurtis Blow. The album is dedicated to the memory of Rebecca Wimbley and William (Divine) Santos. It peaked at number 48 on the US Billboard 200, and number 6 on the Top R&B/Hip Hop Albums chart. The album was certified Gold by the RIAA on May 6, 1985.

The album contains two Billboard singles: "Jail House Rap" and "Can You Feel It?". The songs "Don't You Dog Me" and "Fat Boys" were performed in the movie Krush Groove during the Disco Fever scene. "Jail House Rap" and "Fat Boys" were performed on an episode of Soul Train that aired on January 5, 1985.

On November 23, 2012, the album was reissued in a limited edition CD and vinyl package. The album is housed in a pizza box, with the album itself being a picture disc of pizza, with a special book and bonus material (downloadable for the vinyl version). XXL revisited the Fat Boys' iconic debut album 30 years later.

== Background ==
Buff a.k.a. The Human Beat Box (Darren Robinson), Prince Markie Dee (Mark Morales) and Kool Rock-Ski (Damon Wimbley) were hip-hop's first brand, jumping out of helicopters in Swatch commercials and demolishing buffets in movies. Their manager is a Swiss-born promoter named Charlie Stettler, the owner of his label-management company Tin Pan Apple. In 1983, he put on a hip-hop talent contest at Radio City Music Hall, and the Fat Boys-then rapping as Disco 3-were the unexpected walk-on champs. "Stick 'Em" was the song they used to win the contest. Stettler took the group to his native Switzerland. And though they arrived in Europe as the Disco 3, the group flew back to New York as the Fat Boys. Charlie Stettler hooked up the group with producer Kurtis Blow who gave them their signature sound. Kurtis Blow enlisted Run-D.M.C. drum-machine programmer Larry Smith and bassist Davy "DMX" Reeves, both of whom were behind some of the best records of the era to work on it. "Stick 'Em" was the first thing that they recorded with Kurtis Blow. Charlie Stettler also got Swatch to sponsor 1984's Fresh Festival Tour and convinced Russell Simmons to add the Fat Boys to a line-up that included Run-D.M.C., Whodini and Newcleus.

The Fat Boys released 3 singles from this album: "Jail House Rap", "Can You Feel It?" and "Fat Boys".

The group released 5 official music videos on the songs from this album: "Fat Boys", "Jail House Rap", "Can You Feel It?", "Stick 'Em" and "Don't You Dog Me".

== Critical reception ==
Professional ratings
Review scores
Source	Rating
AllMusic	4.5/5 stars
Robert Christgau	A−
The Rolling Stone Album Guide	4/5 stars

In a contemporary interview and review, Sounds described both the album and single for Fat Boys as "well naff. It's this sort of pointless juvenile gimmickry which is rapidly turning the hip-hop culture into a trembling jelly of silliness with its desperate appeals to the lowest criteria."

Robert Christgau said, "These prize porkers parody insatiability--long after the break of dawn (long after you're limp, Dick), they'll still be stuffing it. They won't ever be great rappers technically, though Prince Markie Dee has the poise and clarity to get close and the bass-kazoo hums and belchlike aspirations of the Human Beat Box show rhythmic instinct and sonic imagination. But their shambling, cheerful fat-boy dance is a party for kids of all ages. I love the hooks on 'Fat Boys' and the barks on 'Don't You Dog Me', and if 'Jail House Rap" is no 'Message' or 'Hustler's Convention', neither is it a trivialization—at least as silly and serious as Lee Dorsey in the coal mine or Sam Cooke on the chain gang."

In a retrospective review AllMusic stated, "Because of their comic image, some hip-hoppers dismissed the Fat Boys as a novelty act -- some, but not many." and noted that The Fat Boys were "among the best and most popular rappers of the mid-1980s. Along with Run-D.M.C., L.L. Cool J, and Whodini, the Fat Boys were the finest that hip-hop's "Second Generation" (as it was called) had to offer." The review declared it to be an "excellent debut album" which was "humorous, wildly entertaining, and unapologetically funky" and that the album was "a true hip-hop classic."

== Track listing ==
Side A

1. "Jail House Rap" (Mark Morales / Damon Wimbley / Darren Robinson / Kurtis Blow / Trevor Horn / Malcolm McLaren) – 8:30
2. "Stick 'Em" (M. Morales / D. Wimbley / D. Robinson) – 4:26
3. "Can You Feel It?" (M. Morales / D. Wimbley / D. Robinson / K. Blow) – 6:38

Side B

1. "Fat Boys" (M. Morales / D. Wimbley / D. Robinson / K. Blow) – 6:50
2. "The Place to Be" (M. Morales / D. Wimbley / D. Robinson / K. Blow) – 4:26
3. "Human Beat Box" (M. Morales / D. Wimbley / D. Robinson) – 2:16
4. "Don't You Dog Me" (M. Morales / D. Wimbley / D. Robinson / K. Blow) – 5:50

2012 bonus tracks

1. "Reality"
2. "International Love"
3. "All You Can Eat"
4. "Fat Boys Promo (Rap Attack)"
5. "Fat Boys and Charlie Stettler Interview (Mr. Magic's Rap Attack - 4/20/84)"
6. "Fat Boys Interview A (Mr. Magic's Rap Attack - 1/23/84)"
7. "Fat Boys Interview B (Mr. Magic's Rap Attack - 1/23/84)"
8. "Mr. Magic announcing the Disco 3 as winners at Radio City Music Hall on May 23, 1983" (hidden bonus track)

Songs sampled by Fat Boys
Title	Samples
"Jail House Rap"	James Thornton (songwriter) – "Arabian Riff (The Streets of Cairo)" (1895); Malcolm McLaren – "Hobo Scratch" (1983)

== Personnel ==
=== The group ===
- Prince Markie Dee – Rapping
- Human Beat Box – Beatbox, Scratching, Rapping
- Kool Rock-Ski – Rapping

=== Additional musicians ===
- Angie Blake – Vocals
- Kurtis Blow – Musician, vocals
- Don Blackman – Musician
- Danny Harris – Musician
- Francis Johnson – Vocals
- Tony McLaughlin – Musician
- David Ogrin – Musician
- Davy "DMX" Reeves – bass
- Larry Smith – drum machine
- Tashawn – Vocals
- Audrew Whleeler – Vocals
- Alyson Williams – Vocals

=== Technical staff ===
- Kurtis Blow, Art Kass, Charles Stettler – producers
- David Ogrin – engineer
- Herb Powers Jr. – mastering engineer

== Charts ==
=== Weekly charts ===
Chart (1984)	Peak position
US Billboard 200	48
US Top R&B/Hip-Hop Albums (Billboard)	6

== Certifications ==
Region	Certification	Certified units/sales
United States (RIAA)	Gold	500,000^{^}
^{^} Shipments figures based on certification alone.
