= List of number-one hits of 1988 (Germany) =

This is a list of the German Media Control Top100 Singles Chart number-ones of 1988.

Key
†	Indicates best-performing single and album of 1988

Issue date	Song	Artist	Album	Artist
4 January	"Whenever You Need Somebody"	Rick Astley	"Misteriosa Venezia"	Rondò Veneziano
11 January	"Always on My Mind"	Pet Shop Boys	"Misteriosa Venezia"	Rondò Veneziano
18 January	"Always on My Mind"	Pet Shop Boys	"Whenever You Need Somebody"	Rick Astley
25 January	"Always on My Mind"	Pet Shop Boys	"Whenever You Need Somebody"	Rick Astley
1 February	"Always on My Mind"	Pet Shop Boys	"Dirty Dancing" †	Various artists
8 February	"Always on My Mind"	Pet Shop Boys	"Dirty Dancing" †	Various artists
15 February	"Always on My Mind"	Pet Shop Boys	"Dirty Dancing" †	Various artists
22 February	"My Love Is a Tango"	Guillermo Marchena	"Lange Schatten"	Peter Maffay
29 February	"My Love Is a Tango"	Guillermo Marchena	"Lange Schatten"	Peter Maffay
7 March	"Tell It to My Heart"	Taylor Dayne	"Lange Schatten"	Peter Maffay
14 March	"Tell It to My Heart"	Taylor Dayne	"Dirty Dancing" †	Various artists
21 March	"Tell It to My Heart"	Taylor Dayne	"Dirty Dancing" †	Various artists
28 March	"Tell It to My Heart"	Taylor Dayne	"Dirty Dancing" †	Various artists
4 April	"Tell It to My Heart"	Taylor Dayne	"Dirty Dancing" †	Various artists
11 April	"I Should Be So Lucky"	Kylie Minogue	"More Dirty Dancing"	Various artists
18 April	"I Should Be So Lucky"	Kylie Minogue	"Ö"	Herbert Grönemeyer
25 April	"Heart"	Pet Shop Boys	"Ö"	Herbert Grönemeyer
2 May	"Heart"	Pet Shop Boys	"Ö"	Herbert Grönemeyer
9 May	"Heart"	Pet Shop Boys	"Ö"	Herbert Grönemeyer
16 May	"Heart"	Pet Shop Boys	"Ö"	Herbert Grönemeyer
23 May	"Ella, Elle L'a"	France Gall	"Ö"	Herbert Grönemeyer
30 May	"Ella, Elle L'a"	France Gall	"Ö"	Herbert Grönemeyer
6 June	"Ella, Elle L'a"	France Gall	"Ö"	Herbert Grönemeyer
13 June	"Ella, Elle L'a"	France Gall	"Ö"	Herbert Grönemeyer
20 June	"Im Nin'Alu"	Ofra Haza	"Ö"	Herbert Grönemeyer
27 June	"Im Nin'Alu"	Ofra Haza	"Ö"	Herbert Grönemeyer
4 July	"Im Nin'Alu"	Ofra Haza	"Ö"	Herbert Grönemeyer
11 July	"Im Nin'Alu"	Ofra Haza	"Ö"	Herbert Grönemeyer
18 July	"Im Nin'Alu"	Ofra Haza	"Ö"	Herbert Grönemeyer
25 July	"Im Nin'Alu"	Ofra Haza	"Bad"	Michael Jackson
1 August	"Im Nin'Alu"	Ofra Haza	"Bad"	Michael Jackson
8 August	"Im Nin'Alu"	Ofra Haza	"Bad"	Michael Jackson
15 August	"The Twist"	The Fat Boys & Chubby Checker	"Bad"	Michael Jackson
22 August	"Girl You Know It's True" †	Milli Vanilli	"Bad"	Michael Jackson
29 August	"Girl You Know It's True" †	Milli Vanilli	"Tracy Chapman"	Tracy Chapman
5 September	"Girl You Know It's True" †	Milli Vanilli	"Tracy Chapman"	Tracy Chapman
12 September	"Girl You Know It's True" †	Milli Vanilli	"Tracy Chapman"	Tracy Chapman
19 September	"Girl You Know It's True" †	Milli Vanilli	"Da Capo"	BAP
26 September	"Girl You Know It's True" †	Milli Vanilli	"Da Capo"	BAP
3 October	"Hand in Hand"	Koreana	"Da Capo"	BAP
10 October	"Hand in Hand"	Koreana	"Da Capo"	BAP
17 October	"Hand in Hand"	Koreana	"Da Capo"	BAP
24 October	"One Moment in Time"	Whitney Houston	"Rattle and Hum"	U2
31 October	"One Moment in Time"	Whitney Houston	"Rattle and Hum"	U2
7 November	"Don't Worry, Be Happy"	Bobby McFerrin	"Rattle and Hum"	U2
14 November	"Don't Worry, Be Happy"	Bobby McFerrin	"Rattle and Hum"	U2
21 November	"Don't Worry, Be Happy"	Bobby McFerrin	"Rattle and Hum"	U2
28 November	"Don't Worry, Be Happy"	Bobby McFerrin	"Live - Nach uns die Sintflut"	Die Ärzte
5 December	"Don't Worry, Be Happy"	Bobby McFerrin	"Rattle and Hum"	U2
12 December	"Don't Worry, Be Happy"	Bobby McFerrin	"Pop Goes Classic"	Munich Symphony Orchestra
19 December	"Don't Worry, Be Happy"	Bobby McFerrin	"Pop Goes Classic"	Munich Symphony Orchestra
26 December	"Don't Worry, Be Happy"	Bobby McFerrin	"Pop Goes Classic"	Munich Symphony Orchestra

== See also ==
- List of number-one hits (Germany)
