= The Twist (song) =

Single

"The Twist" is an American song written and originally released in 1958 by Hank Ballard and the Midnighters as a B-side to "Teardrops on Your Letter". It was inspired by the twist dance craze. Ballard's version was a moderate hit, peaking at number 28 on the US Billboard Hot 100 in 1960. On the US Billboard Hot R&B Sides chart, the original version of "The Twist" first peaked at number 16 in 1959 and at number six in 1960. By 1962, the record sold in excess of one million copies, becoming Ballard's fourth million seller.

Chubby Checker's 1960 cover version of the song reached number one on the Billboard Hot 100 on September 19, 1960, where it stayed for one week and then went on to set a record at the time as the only song to reach number one during two different chart runs when it resurfaced and topped the Hot 100 again for two weeks starting on January 13, 1962. This would not happen for another song for nearly 59 years until December 2020, when Mariah Carey's "All I Want for Christmas Is You" reached the summit after previously topping in another separate chart run in December 2019.

On Billboard's list of all-time No. 1 Hot 100 singles, which considers total weeks on the chart and chart position each week, "The Twist" held the top position from 2008 until September 2020, when "Blinding Lights" by the Weeknd took over the top position. In 2014, Billboard magazine declared the song the "biggest hit" of the 1960s. On Canada's CHUM Charts, the songs were co-charted, reaching number two on August 22, 1960.

== History ==
Hank Ballard wrote "The Twist" after seeing teenagers in Tampa, Florida, doing the dance, the twist. In a 2014 interview with Tom Meros, Midnighters member Lawson Smith claimed that The Gospel Consolaters' Nathaniel Bills wrote the song and initially asked The Spaniels to record it, and that Ballard "stole" the song, falsely claiming authorship. Green and Ballard already had written a song together called "Is Your Love for Real", which was based on Clyde McPhatter and The Drifters' 1955 song "What'cha Gonna Do", so they created an entirely new song by simply putting the new Twist words to the older melody. They originally recorded a loose version of the song in a Florida studio for Vee-Jay Records in early 1958, with slightly different lyrics, featuring Green on guitar playing like Jimmy Reed. This version appeared on the box set "The Vee-Jay Story" in 1993, but it went unreleased at the time. They did not get around to recording the released version until November 11, 1958, when the Midnighters were in Cincinnati.

Ballard thought "The Twist" was the hit side, but King Records producer Henry Glover preferred the ballad "Teardrops on Your Letter", which he had written himself. The song ultimately became the B-side of Hank Ballard and The Midnighters' 1959 single "Teardrops on Your Letter".

== Chubby Checker version ==
"The Twist"
- 1960 45 rpm label

Single by Chubby Checker

from the album Twist with Chubby Checker
- B-side: "Toot"; "Twistin' USA"
- Released: June 1960
- Recorded: 1960
- Studio: Cameo-Parkway; Reco-Art (Philadelphia, Pennsylvania)
- Genre: Pop; rock and roll
- Length: 2:34
- Label: Parkway
- Songwriter: Hank Ballard
- Producer: Dave Appell

Chubby Checker singles chronology
"Dancing Dinosaur" (1959)	"The Twist" (1960)	"The Hucklebuck" (1960)

The song became popular on a Baltimore television dance show hosted by local DJ Buddy Deane; Deane recommended the song to Dick Clark, host of the national American Bandstand, then based in Philadelphia. When the song proved popular with his audience, Clark attempted to book Ballard to perform on the show. Ballard was unavailable, and Clark searched for a local artist to record the song. He settled on Checker, whose voice was very similar to Ballard's. Checker's version featured Buddy Savitt on saxophone and Ellis Tollin on drums, with backing vocals by the Dreamlovers. Exposure for the song on American Bandstand and on The Dick Clark Saturday Night Show helped propel the song to the top of the American charts.

In July 1960, Checker performed "The Twist" for the first time in front of a live audience at the Rainbow Club in Wildwood, New Jersey, and just weeks later, on August 6, 1960, the song became a national sensation after Checker performed it on Dick Clark's American Bandstand. In Canada, his version was co-charted with the Hank Ballard version.

In late 1961 and early 1962, the twist craze belatedly caught on in high society. Sightings of celebrities doing the dance made the song a hit with adults, particularly after a report in the Cholly Knickerbocker gossip column. Soon there were long lines at the Peppermint Lounge nightclub in New York, the most popular celebrity twisting spot. This new interest made "The Twist" the first recording to hit number one on the United States charts during two separate chart runs, and marked a major turning point for adult acceptance of rock and roll music.

Checker re-recorded the song numerous times. An updated 1982 recording (from his album The Change Has Come) was retitled "T-82", and in the 1990s, he recorded a country version. In the late 1970s, he recorded a new version that, except for the sound mix and some minor arrangement changes, was identical to the 1960 original; as a result this later version is often misidentified on compilations as the original recording. In 1988, he joined The Fat Boys on a rap version of the song, which hit number 2 in the UK, number 16 in the US, and number 1 in Germany and Switzerland. Checker also joined the group to perform the song that summer at a London tribute concert for Nelson Mandela. In addition, he recorded variations on the theme, such as "Let's Twist Again" to keep the craze alive ("Let's Twist Again" was and has remained more popular than "The Twist" itself in the United Kingdom). Joey Dee and the Starliters, the Peppermint Lounge house band, scored a hit with "Peppermint Twist", while other artists, including Sam Cooke scored with other "Twist"-themed songs. In Europe, Petula Clark scored hits in several countries with "Twist"-themed records, while Bill Haley and His Comets recorded several albums of Twist songs in Mexico for the Orfeon Records label. In 1997, the song was featured in a Teledyne Waterpik commercial, and a commercial for Denny's in 1998, to promote the New Slams.

In the sixth episode of the second season of the TV series Quantum Leap, entitled "Good Morning, Peoria" (set on September 9, 1959), Dr. Sam Beckett (Scott Bakula) and Al Calavicci (Dean Stockwell) meet Chubby Checker (played by himself) in a radio station, where they sing and dance "The Twist". An impressed Checker asks, "Can I use that move?" Sam responds, "Yah, but I got it from you!". The song was used in the 2007 film Spider-Man 3 and appears on the film's official soundtrack album.

=== Charts ===
==== Weekly charts ====
Chart (1960–1962)	Peak position
Australia (Kent Music Report)	20
Belgium (Ultratop 50 Flanders)	14
Belgium (Ultratop 50 Wallonia)	15
Canada (CHUM Chart 1960)	2
Canada (CHUM Chart 1962)(6wks@#1)	1
Finland (Suomen virallinen lista)	11
France (IFOP)	44
Netherlands (Single Top 100)	6
Switzerland (Sonntagsblick Hitparade)	7
US Billboard Hot 100	1
US Hot R&B Sides (Billboard)	2
West Germany (GfK)	12

==== Year-end charts ====
Chart (1960)	Position
US Billboard Hot 100	10
Chart (1962)	Position
US Billboard Hot 100	9

==== Decade-end charts ====
Chart (1960–69)	Position
US Billboard Hot 100	1

==== All-time charts ====
Chart	Position
US Billboard Hot 100	2

== Keil Isles version ==
"The Twist"

Song by Herma Keil with the Keil Isles
- A-side: "The Twist"
- B-side: "Siboney"
- Released: 1961
- Label: Viking VS.69
- Composer: Hank Ballard
- Producer: David Dunningham

Herma Keil with the Keil Isles (N.Z.) chronology
"Don't You Know" (1960)	"The Twist" (1961)	"Twisting N.Z. Way" (1962)

=== Background ===
The Keil Isles recorded "The Twist" with David Dunningham as their producer. They also recorded the song "Siboney" which was also produced by Dunningham. With "The Twist" as the A side, both songs were released on Viking Records single VS.69. The single was credited to Herma Keil with the Keil Isles. Chubby Checker's version of "The Twist" was deemed to too noisy for airplay by New Zealand's NZBS. This cleared the way for the Keil Isles to have success with their version.

As reported by Fred Gebbie in the New Zealand section of Billboard Music Week for the week of 10 March 1962, the Keil version of "The Twist" had topped the 18,000 mark. Their version outsold Chubby Checker's version in New Zealand.

=== Airplay ===
As reported in the 17 February issue of Billboard Music Week, Chubby Checker's rejected version of "The Twist" had finally been given air-time on New Zealand radio but that wasn't until the version by The Keil Isles had been plugged throughout New Zealand.

=== Charts ===
==== Billboard Music Week Hits Of The World, New Zealand ====
For the week of 17 February 1962, both The Keil Isles and Chubby Checker versions of "The Twist" had moved from No. 2 to No. 1 on the New zealand section of the Billboard Music Week Hits Of The World chart. The following week, only the Chubby Checker version was showing on the chart. For the week of 3 March, there was no New Zealand section shown. For the week of 10 March with the New Zealand section included, both The Chubby Checker and Keil Isles versions had dropped down from No. 2 to No. 7.

=== Follow ups ===
Following their success with "The Twist", the Keil Isles followed up with singles such as "Twisting New Zealand Way", "Twist It Up" and "Twist and Freeze".

== Fat Boys version ==
"The Twist"

Single by Fat Boys with Chubby Checker

from the album Coming Back Hard Again
- B-side: "The Twist" (Buffapella)
- Released: 1988
- Length: 4:00 (7-inch version)
- Label: Tin Pan Apple; Polydor
- Composer: Hank Ballard
- Lyricists: Hank Ballard; Jim Glenn; Damon Wimbley
- Producers: Albert Cabrera; Tony Moran

Fat Boys singles chronology
"Wipeout!" (1987)	"The Twist" (1988)	"Are You Ready for Freddy" (1988)

Chubby Checker singles chronology
"Harder Than Diamond" (1982)	"The Twist" (1988)	"Knock Down the Walls" (2008)

In 1988, American hip-hop trio Fat Boys covered "The Twist" with featured lyrics from Checker and additional rap lyrics written by Jim Glenn and Damon Wimbley. Produced by Albert Cabrera and Tony Moran (the Latin Rascals), this version reached number two in the United Kingdom and number one in West Germany, as well as number 16 on the Billboard Hot 100. The song's music video was produced by Ken Walz and shows the Fat Boys doing the twist with Checker at a sweet sixteen party. Checker initially missed the filming in May 1988 due to being hospitalized with spinal meningitis.

=== Track listings ===
7-inch and cassette single

A. "The Twist" (Yo, Twist!) – 4:00
B. "The Twist" (Buffapella) – 4:15

US 12-inch single

A1. "The Twist" (Twist So Def version) – 5:57
A2. "Yo, Twist!" (7-inch version) – 4:00
B1. "The Twist" (Yell for More!) – 6:30
B2. "The Twist" (Buffapella) – 4:15

CDV single

1. "Rock the House, Y'all" (audio) – 3:30
2. "Comin' Back Hard Again" (audio) – 3:20
3. "Back and Forth" (audio) – 2:40
4. "The Twist" (audio) – 4:05
5. "The Twist" (video) – 5:00

=== Charts ===
==== Weekly charts ====
Chart (1988)	Peak position
Australia (ARIA)	28
Austria (Ö3 Austria Top 40)	5
Belgium (Ultratop 50 Flanders)	2
Canada Top Singles (RPM)	37
Canada Dance/Urban (RPM)	12
Denmark (IFPI)	2
Europe (Eurochart Hot 100)	2
France (SNEP)	22
Ireland (IRMA)	4
Italy Airplay (Music & Media)	19
Netherlands (Dutch Top 40)	2
Netherlands (Single Top 100)	4
New Zealand (Recorded Music NZ)	7
South Africa (Springbok Radio)	6
Spain (AFYVE)	4
Sweden (Sverigetopplistan)	7
Switzerland (Schweizer Hitparade)	1
UK Singles (Official Charts)	2
US Billboard Hot 100	16
US 12-inch Singles Sales (Billboard)	47
US Hot Black Singles (Billboard)	40
West Germany (GfK)	1

==== Year-end charts ====
Chart (1988)	Position
Belgium (Ultratop)	24
Europe (Eurochart Hot 100)	15
Netherlands (Dutch Top 40)	29
Netherlands (Single Top 100)	32
New Zealand (RIANZ)	44
Switzerland (Schweizer Hitparade)	12
UK Singles (OCC)	33
West Germany (Media Control)	10

=== Certifications ===
Region	Certification	Certified units/sales
Germany (BVMI)	Gold	250,000^{^}
^{^} Shipments figures based on certification alone.

== Accolades ==
Chubby Checker's "The Twist" held the honor of being the most successful single in Billboard history on its various "Greatest Hot 100 Songs of All Time" charts over the decades. It held the title until 2021, when it was dethroned by the Weeknd's "Blinding Lights".

The song was ranked number 451 on the Rolling Stone magazine's list of The 500 Greatest Songs of All Time in 2004, and number 457 on the revised list in 2010. Jim Dawson wrote a 1995 book about the song and the Twist phenomenon called The Twist: The Story of the Song and Dance That Changed the World for Faber and Faber.

In 2000, the 1960 recording by Chubby Checker on Parkway Records was inducted into the Grammy Hall of Fame.

The song has been added to the National Recording Registry in the Library of Congress on March 21, 2013, for long-term preservation. In 2014, Billboard magazine declared the song the "biggest hit" of the 1960s.

In 2018, Checker's version was one of six singles inducted into the Rock and Roll Hall of Fame in a new category honoring singles by artists who have not been elected to the Hall.

== Editions ==
- USA: Hank Ballard and the Midnighters: "Teardrops on Your Letter" b/w "The Twist" 1959
- USA: Chubby Checker: "The Twist" b/w "Toot" Parkway 811; 7/60
- USA: Chubby Checker: "The Twist" b/w "Twistin' USA" Parkway 811; 11/61

== See also ==
- List of Billboard Hot 100 number-one songs of 1960
- List of Billboard Hot 100 number-one songs of 1962
- List of number-one hits of 1988 (Germany)
- List of number-one hits of 1988 (Switzerland)
- List of twist songs
