= Disco Fever =

New York City dance club

Coordinates: 40.83626°N 73.92175°W

Disco Fever was a New York City dance club located in the South Bronx at 1218 Jerome Avenue near 167th Street that operated from 1976 to 1986. After initially failing to draw many customers, Sal Abbatiello convinced his father, the owner, to hand over the reins. Abbatiello quickly began featuring hip hop artists including a young Grandmaster Flash, and the club greatly increased in popularity and fame. Hip hop group Run-D.M.C. performed their first show at the club. Sal could not and did not feature Grandmaster Flash, Run-D.M.C and other legendary artists without George "Sweet G" "Weesee" Godfrey, who had the street credibility and connections to these artists.

== History ==
The club started out as a neighborhood bar. Albert "Allie" Abbatiello, an Italian American, already operated two nightclubs in the Bronx serving primarily African Americans: the Golden Hour and Pepper-n-Salt. He reworked the old bar to be his third nightclub, aimed initially at an older crowd. According to his son Sal, "We had been lookin' for a name for about three months, and we were sitting down watchin' tv and my mom saw an advertisement for Saturday Night Disco Fever [sic]; and she says why don't you name it Disco Fever – we said, 'nah, get outta here.' The next day we got up sayin' Disco Fever sounds pretty hot. So we got it from my mom, she named it."

It opened in 1976, but did not get popular quickly. The place could hold 350, but on a good night only about 200 would come through. Sal Abbatiello served as a bartender; one night after hours he saw how the night manager, George Godfrey, was playing records and calling to the small group of patrons on the microphone, getting a party started. Abbatiello thought that this unusual practice of talking over the music, getting the crowd involved, was very good for business as it engaged the people who were sitting at the bar and were not dancing. Abbatiello asked Godfrey, who performed as "Sweet G", to recommend artists of this type for the club, and Godfrey took him to see Grandmaster Flash perform in the local park along with two other artists; the group called themselves "Grandmaster Flash & the 3 MCs", the predecessor of Grandmaster Flash and the Furious Five. Abbatiello asked for and received permission from his father to book musical artists on Tuesday nights.

In 1977, the first Tuesday night show featured Grandmaster Flash; he was paid $50, the other two MCs $25. Abbatiello settled upon a door charge of $1 per patron and a minimum requirement of one drink at $1. This low price combined with a promotional campaign of flyers distributed locally resulted in a long line waiting at the front door. Seeing the large crowd, Abbatiello called for additional help from his father's nearby club, Pepper-n-Salt. The Disco Fever grossed $1,000, establishing the success of the experiment.

Abbatiello continued to bring in rappers and DJs exclusively, and the club began to thrive. He expanded from Tuesday night hip hop to all nights, and soon the Disco Fever was the most famous hip hop club in New York. The club was mentioned in the Grandmaster Flash song "The Message" in 1982, and in 1983 Bill Adler wrote in People magazine that it was "the rap capital of the Solar System". Rapper Kurtis Blow said that he went to the club to get ideas, "to see what the street likes". Abbatiello started a record label—Fever Records—to introduce new hip hop artists; Kurtis Blow signed his first record deal with the label. Producer Russell Simmons valued the club as an effective test market for new music; he said, "if a rap record doesn't go around in the Fever, it's fake." Simmons convinced Abbatiello to give his little brother Joseph, the "Run" in Run–D.M.C., a chance on stage; the result was that Run–D.M.C.'s first paying gig was at the Disco Fever.

Grandmaster Flash said that Abbatiello would sometimes reward a hip hop artist who "rock[ed] the house" by offering champagne and privacy in an exclusive room called "The Ice Room". This kind of star treatment brought women interested in joining the DJs and MCs in celebrating: Grandmaster Flash said, "crazy shit used to happen" in the private hideaway.

Sal Abbatiello encouraged a sense of family among his employees and the patrons, which is credited with saving him from the violent incidents common to other hip hop venues. He also encouraged a sense of community by using the club as a focus for community activities. In 1982, the nightclub hosted a telethon to benefit the United Negro College Fund, raising $8,000. Partnering with two hip hop artists, Abbatiello started an amateur basketball league in the neighborhood. In early '83 an Easter party with gifts and food was thrown by Disco Fever for about 250 neighborhood children, with free admission. The nightclub organized transportation to local prisons so that people in the community could visit prisoners who were family members. Abbatiello said the club's role as community center had made it much like "the YMCA of the Bronx".

The 1985 movie Krush Groove was filmed at Disco Fever, and unwittingly served as the final chapter of the nightclub. Featuring the likes of Sheila E., Beastie Boys, Run–D.M.C., New Edition, The Fat Boys, and LL Cool J, the film was a celebration of hip hop club life. Sal Abbatiello had his acting debut by playing himself in the movie. However, in the process of getting the proper film permits, the film producers discovered that Disco Fever had been operating from the beginning without the required cabaret license. The community board in charge of approving such a permit turned Abbatiello down. He said, "they used a technicality to close me up after I renovated the park, after I did the United Negro Fund, I started a youth association, I started a skating rink so all the kids had someplace to go skate and do their homework." After failing to get the permit, Abbatiello just closed up and walked away."
