= Michael Schultz =

American film, television, and theatre director (b. 1938)

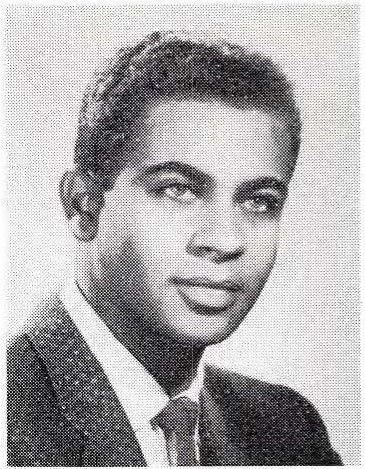
- Schultz in 1957
- Born: November 10, 1938 (age 87); Milwaukee, Wisconsin, U.S.
- Education: University of Wisconsin–Madison; Marquette University; Princeton University
- Occupations: Film director, television director, theater director, film producer
- Years active: 1968–present
- Spouse: Lauren Jones (m. 1965)
- Children: 2

Michael Schultz (born November 10, 1938) is an American director and producer of theater, film and television. He is best known for his comedy films, including Car Wash (1976), Which Way Is Up? (1977), Scavenger Hunt (1979), Carbon Copy (1981) and The Last Dragon (1985), several of which have become cult classics. He is notable as the first Black or African American filmmaker to have been honored at the Cannes Film Festival, winning the Technical Grand Prize and being nominated for a Palme d'Or for Car Wash.

== Early life and education ==
Schultz was born in Milwaukee, Wisconsin, the son of an African-American mother Katherine Frances Leslie (1917–1995), and Leo Albert Schultz (1913–2001), a white insurance salesman of German descent. Shortly before his birth his parents married in Iowa, where both were listed as black on their marriage license. Mr. Schultz's occupation was listed as "Musician" at the time of his marriage.

Michael Schultz, who was known as "Mike" growing up, attended Riverside High School in Milwaukee, where he was a very active student. He played baseball, football and participated in student theater productions.

After his undergraduate work at the University of Wisconsin–Madison and Marquette University, he attended Princeton University, where in 1966 he directed his first play, a production of Waiting for Godot. He joined the Negro Ensemble Company in 1968, which brought him to Broadway in 1969.

== Career ==
His breakthrough was directing Lorraine Hansberry's To Be Young, Gifted and Black, which he restaged for television in 1972.

Schultz' earlier film projects combined low comedy with profound social comment (Honeybaby, Honeybaby and Cooley High), reaching a peak with the ensemble comedy Car Wash (1976) and Which Way Is Up? (1977), starring Richard Pryor. Denzel Washington, Samuel L. Jackson and Blair Underwood all made their first feature-film appearances in a Schultz movie. Car Wash was nominated for the Palme d'Or and won the Technical Grand Prize, making Schultz the first Black or African American filmmaker to have been honored at the festival.

In 1978, Schultz took the reins of the musical Sgt. Pepper's Lonely Hearts Club Band with the largest budget entrusted to an African-American film director to that date. However, upon its release, the project was a commercial and critical failure. Schultz made the ensemble comedy Scavenger Hunt (1979), Denzel Washington's film debut Carbon Copy (1981).

On May 31, 1982, the television film Benny's Place premiered. The story is based on play that was also directed on stage by Schultz. Louis Gossett Jr. accepted the lead role for the opportunity to work with Schultz. In it Gossett plays an older man pushing retirement who is asked to trained a replacement for his position at the steel mill where he works.

In 1985, Schultz also directed the classic martial arts film, The Last Dragon, starring Taimak and Vanity.

On July 23, 1986, Michael Schultz formed his own production company Crystalite Productions, with his wife Gloria Schultz, and wanted to start producing three features in development.

In 1987, he directed the screwball comedy Disorderlies starring the rap group The Fat Boys.

More recently, Schultz has worked in television, piloting episodes of such style-conscious series as George Lucas's The Young Indiana Jones Chronicles and Picket Fences as well as an abundance of TV movies.

In 1991, Schultz was inducted into the Black Filmmakers Hall of Fame.

== Personal life ==
Schultz married Gloria Jones in Brooklyn, New York in 1965. As an actress, his wife is known professionally as Lauren Jones; in non-acting capacities, she is known as Gloria Schultz. The couple has two children.

== Filmography ==
=== Television ===
TV movies

- To Be Young, Gifted, and Black (1972)
- Benny's Place (1982)
- For Us the Living: The Medgar Evers Story (1983)
- The Jerk, Too (1984)
- The Spirit (1987)
- Timestalkers (1987)
- Rock 'n' Roll Mom (1988)
- Tarzan in Manhattan (1989)
- Hammer, Slammer, & Slade (1990)
- Jury Duty: The Comedy (1990)
- Day-O (1992)
- Young Indiana Jones and the Hollywood Follies (1994)
- Shock Treatment (1995)
- Young Indiana Jones: Travels with Father (1996)
- Killers in the House (1998)
- My Last Love (1999)
- The Adventures of Young Indiana Jones: Tales of Innocence (1999)
- L.A. Law: The Movie (2002)

TV series

- The Rockford Files (1974)
- Starsky and Hutch (1975)
- Baretta (1975)
- Diagnosis: Murder (1993)
- Chicago Hope (1994)
- Ally McBeal (1997)
- JAG (1997–2002)
- The Practice (1997)
- Ally (1999)
- Philly (2001)
- Everwood
- Brothers and sisters
- Cold Case (2006)
- Eli Stone (2007)
- Dirty Sexy Money (2007)
- Chuck (2010)
- Arrow (2012–2017)
- The Mysteries of Laura (2014)
- Black-ish (2015–2017)
- Crazy Ex-Girlfriend (2016)
- New Girl (2016–2018)
- Star (2017)
- Once Upon a Time (2017)
- Step Up: High Water (2018)
- Black Lightning (2018–2020)
- Code Black (2018)
- Manifest (2018)
- All American (2019–2026)
- All American: Homecoming (2022–2024)
- The Wonder Years (2023)
- Found (2023-2025)

=== Film ===
- Together for Days (1972)
- Honeybaby, Honeybaby (1974)
- Cooley High (1975)
- Car Wash (1976)
- Greased Lightning (1977)
- Which Way Is Up? (1977)
- Sgt. Pepper's Lonely Hearts Club Band (1978)
- Scavenger Hunt (1979)
- Bustin' Loose (1981)
- Carbon Copy (1981)
- Krush Groove (1985)
- The Last Dragon (1985)
- Disorderlies (1987)
- The White Girl (1990)
- Livin' Large! (1991)
- Nikita's Blues (1999)
- Dreamers (2000)
- Woman Thou Art Loosed (2004)

== Partial theatre credits ==
- God Is a (Guess What?) (1968)
- Kongi's Harvest (1968)
- Song of the Lusitanian Bogey (1968) Obie Award, Best Director
- The Reckoning (1969)
- Does a Tiger Wear a Necktie? (1969, Belasco Theatre)
- Operation Sidewinder (1970)
- The Dream on Monkey Mountain (1971)
- The Cherry Orchard (1972)
- Thoughts (1973)
- What the Wine-Sellers Buy (1974, Vivian Beaumont Theater)
- Mule Bone (1991, Ethel Barrymore Theatre)
