= Big & Beautiful =

Studio album by Fat Boys
- Released: 1986
- Studio: Brooklyn Music Factory, Ltd.; D&D (New York, NY); Quad (New York, NY); Synth-Net, Inc.
- Genre: Hip hop
- Label: Sutra
- Producer: Dave Ogrin; Fresh Gordon; Fat Boys; the Latin Rascals

Fat Boys chronology
The Fat Boys Are Back (1985)	Big & Beautiful (1986)	Crushin' (1987)

Singles from Big & Beautiful
- 1. "Sex Machine" Released: 1986; 2. "In the House" Released: 1986

Big & Beautiful is the third studio album by American hip hop trio Fat Boys. It was released in 1986 through Sutra Records, marking the group's final release for the label. The recording sessions took place at Brooklyn Music Factory, D&D Studios, Quad Recording Studios, and Synth-Net, Inc. The album was produced by Dave Ogrin, Fresh Gordon, the Latin Rascals, and the Fat Boys, with Gary Rottger serving as co-producer. In the United States, the album peaked at number 62 on the Top Pop Albums and number 10 on the Top Black Albums charts. It was supported with two singles: "Sex Machine" and "In the House", both went charted on the Hot Black Singles chart, reaching No. 23 and 51, respectively.

== Critical reception ==
Professional ratings
Review scores
Source	Rating
AllMusic	2/5 stars
The Philadelphia Inquirer	3/4 stars
(The New) Rolling Stone Album Guide	2/5 stars
The Village Voice	B+

The Philadelphia Inquirer wrote that the group "overcomes charges of being a mere novelty act with its spectacularly successful interpretation of James Brown's 'Sex Machine', which manages to make clear the roots of funk that lie deep within rap." The New York Times noted that the album "can rapidly become wearing, once the initial impact of its jokes and satire wear off".

== Track listing ==
No.	Title	Writer(s)	Producer(s)	Length
1.	"Sex Machine"	Mark Morales; Damon Wimbley; Darren Robinson; James Brown; Bobby Byrd; Ron Lenhoff	Dave Ogrin	4:41
2.	"Go for It"	Morales; Gordon Pickett; Jalil Hutchins	Prince Markie Dee; Fresh Gordon	4:28
3.	"Breakdown"	Morales; Wimbley; Robinson; Albert Cabrera; Anthony Moran	The Latin Rascals	4:08
4.	"Double-O-Fat Boys"	David W. Ogrin	Dave Ogrin	4:58
5.	"Big and Beautiful"	Morales; Wimbley; Robinson; Ogrin	Dave Ogrin	4:21
6.	"Rap Symphony (C-Minor)"	Morales; Pickett	Prince Markie Dee; Fresh Gordon	3:53
7.	"Beat Box, Part III"	Morales; Wimbley; Robinson; Ogrin	Dave Ogrin; the Fat Boys	3:23
8.	"In the House"	Morales; Pickett	Dave Ogrin; Prince Markie Dee; Fresh Gordon	4:02
9.	"Beat Box Is Rockin'"	Morales; Wimbley; Robinson; Ogrin; Gary Rottger	Dave Ogrin; Gary Rottger (co.)	3:28

== Personnel ==
- Mark "Prince Markie Dee" Morales — vocals, producer (tracks: 2, 6–8)
- Damon "Kool Rock-Ski" Wimbley — vocals, producer (track 7)
- Darren "Buff Love" Robinson — vocals, producer (track 7)
- Alyson Williams — backing vocals
- Audrey Wheeler — backing vocals
- Cindy Mizelle — backing vocals
- Peter Lewis — backing vocals
- Peter Sturge — backing vocals
- Dave Ogrin — producer (tracks: 1, 4, 5, 7–9), mixing (track 1), engineering
- Gordon "Fresh Gordon" Pickett — producer (tracks: 2, 6, 8)
- Albert Cabrera — producer (track 3)
- Tony Moran — producer (track 3)
- Gary Rottger — co-producer (track 9)
- Bobby Di Riso — engineering
- Doug Grama — engineering
- Charles Stettler — executive producer
- Lynda West — cover design
- Howard Menken — photography

== Charts ==
Chart (1986)	Peak position
US Billboard 200	62
US Top R&B/Hip-Hop Albums (Billboard)	10
