= Prince Markie Dee =

American rapper (1968–2021)

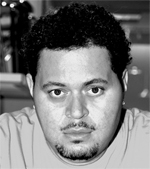

Background information
- Born: Mark Anthony Morales; February 19, 1968; Brooklyn, New York City, U.S.
- Died: February 18, 2021 (aged 52) Miami, Florida, U.S.
- Genres: Hip hop; new jack swing
- Occupations: Rapper; producer; songwriter; actor
- Years active: 1982–2021
- Labels: Columbia; Motown
- Formerly of: The Fat Boys

Mark Anthony Morales (February 19, 1968 – February 18, 2021), better known by the stage name Prince Markie Dee, was an American rapper and music producer. He was a member of the Fat Boys, a pioneering hip hop group that gained fame during the 1980s. Morales was the vice-president of Uncle Louie Music Group.

== Early life ==
Morales was born on February 19, 1968. He established the Disco 3 together with Darren Robinson and Damon Wimbley in the early 1980s. After winning a talent contest at the Radio City Music Hall in 1983, they signed a contract with the show's promoter. The promoter recommended that the group rename itself the Fat Boys, in reference to their weight.

== Career ==
=== The Fat Boys ===
Morales's accomplishments with the Fat Boys include seven full-length albums. Of these, three attained gold certification and one – Crushin' (1987) – reached platinum. Their hit song from that album that featured The Beach Boys, "Wipeout", peaked to number 12 on the Billboard Hot 100. The trio also appeared in the comedy film Disorderlies that same year. They had earlier starred in the feature films Krush Groove (1985) and Knights of the City (1986). The Fat Boys attempted to broaden their artistic scope by releasing On and On (1989), a rap opera album. Its lack of success hastened the demise of the group. They released one more album, Mack Daddy (1991), before disbanding soon afterwards.

=== Later career ===
After the Fat Boys, Morales embarked on a solo career. He signed with Columbia Records and released a solo album, Free (1992). It included a #1 hit single, "Typical Reasons (Swing My Way)". After joining with Cory Rooney to form a production company, Soul Convention, Morales wrote and produced tracks for such artists as Mary J. Blige, Jennifer Lopez, Mariah Carey, Craig Mack and Marc Anthony. He was a producer for Blige's first album, What's the 411? (1992), including her hit song from that album, "Real Love".

From 2008 to 2010, Morales served as the afternoon drive radio host/DJ at 103.5 The Beat WMIB radio in Miami, Florida. He subsequently worked at WEDR 99.1 FM. He last worked at the Rock the Bells SiriusXM station, hosting his own show, The Prince Markie Dee Show.

== Personal life ==
Morales once dated and was engaged to rapper Pepa in the mid-1980s.

== Death ==
Morales died on February 18, 2021, in Miami the day before his 53rd birthday of congestive heart failure.

== Discography ==
=== Solo albums ===
- Free (1992, Columbia Records)
- Love Daddy (1995, Motown)

=== With Fat Boys ===
- Fat Boys (1984, Sutra)
- The Fat Boys Are Back (1985, Sutra)
- Big & Beautiful (1986, Sutra)
- Crushin' (1987, Tin Pan Apple/Polydor/PolyGram)
- Coming Back Hard Again (1988, Tin Pan Apple/Polydor/PolyGram)
- On and On (1989, Tin Pan Apple/Mercury/PolyGram)

== Filmography ==
- Krush Groove (1985)
- Knights of the City (1986)
- Disorderlies (1987)
