= John Mengatti =

American actor

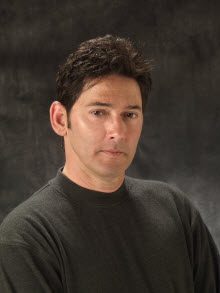
- Backstage at the Kodak Theatre, December 2009
- Born: September 21, 1954; New York City, New York, U.S.
- Died: March 26, 2023 (aged 68)
- Occupations: Actor, producer
- Years active: 1972–2023
- Spouse: Lisa Nash-Jones

John Mengatti (September 21, 1954 – March 26, 2023) was an American actor primarily known for his role as Nick Vitaglia, Salami's cousin, on the CBS television series The White Shadow. Mengatti joined the cast midway through the second season and was a fan favorite with his distinctive New York–style accent. In 1982 he had guest appearances on The Facts of Life and CHiPs. In 1984, he appeared in Meatballs Part II.

After The White Shadow, Mengatti had sparse television and movie acting roles until 1986. He dropped out of acting for a while, but recently resurfaced on NYPD Blue in 2001 in a recurring role as Officer Howard.

Mengatti also appeared in Knights of the City, a 1986 action adventure film starring Leon Isaac Kennedy, Nicholas Campbell and Janine Turner. It was directed by Dominic Orlando and written by Leon Isaac Kennedy and filmed in Miami, Ft. Lauderdale and Hollywood, Florida.

Mengatti died on March 26, 2023, at the age of 68.

== Filmography ==
Film
Year	Title	Role	Notes
1982	Tag: The Assassination Game	Randy Simonetti	
1984	Meatballs Part II	Armand "Flash" Carducci	
1986	Knights of the City	Mookie	
1987	Hadley's Rebellion	Bobby Clark	
1991	Dead Men Don't Die	Officer Ramirez	
2004	Land of the Free?	Walker	
Television
Year	Title	Role	Notes
1979–81	The White Shadow	Nick Vitaglia	Main cast (34 episodes)
1982	Taxi	The Boy	Episode: "Nina Loves Alex"
1982	The Facts of Life	Paul Largo	Episode: "Jo's Cousin"
1982	9 to 5	Fast Freddie	Episode: "The Party's Over"
1982	CHiPs	Boz	Episode: "This Year's Riot"
1983–84	For Love and Honor	Pvt. Dominick Petrizzo	Main cast (12 episodes)
1984	E/R	Jake	Episode: "All Tied Up"
1985	Stir Crazy	Pepper	Episode: "Pilot"
1986	Cagney & Lacey	Billy De Salvo	Episode: "Act of Conscience"
2001–02	NYPD Blue	Officer Howard	Recurring role (2 episodes)
