= A Nightmare on Elm Street 4: The Dream Master =

1988 film by Renny Harlin

- Theatrical release poster by Matthew Peak
- Directed by: Renny Harlin
- Screenplay by: Brian Helgeland; Scott Pierce (Note: Pseudonym for Ken and Jim Wheat)
- Story by: William Kotzwinkle; Brian Helgeland
- Based on: Characters by Wes Craven
- Produced by: Robert Shaye; Rachel Talalay
- Starring: Robert Englund
- Cinematography: Steven Fierberg
- Edited by: Michael N. Knue; Chuck Weiss
- Music by: Craig Safan
- Production companies: New Line Cinema; Heron Communications; Smart Egg Pictures
- Distributed by: New Line Cinema
- Release date: August 19, 1988
- Running time: 93 minutes
- Country: United States
- Language: English
- Budget: $6.5 million
- Box office: $49.4 million (US)

A Nightmare on Elm Street 4: The Dream Master is a 1988 American fantasy slasher film directed by Renny Harlin from a screenplay by Brian Helgeland and Scott Pierce. It is the sequel to A Nightmare on Elm Street 3: Dream Warriors (1987) and the fourth installment in the A Nightmare on Elm Street franchise. The film follows Freddy Krueger (Robert Englund) reappearing in the dreams of Kristen Parker, Joey Crusel, and Roland Kincaid, where he uses Kristen's best friend, Alice Johnson, to gain access to new victims in order to continue his killing spree.

Following the release of Dream Warriors, series creator Wes Craven pitched his own idea for a fourth film. However, it was turned down in favor of another sequel. The Dream Master is often popularly referred to as "the MTV Nightmare" of the franchise.

A Nightmare on Elm Street 4: The Dream Master was released on August 19, 1988. The film received mixed reviews from critics and grossed $49.4 million at the domestic box office on a budget of $6.5 million, which made it the highest-grossing film in the franchise in the United States until the release of Freddy vs. Jason, a crossover with the Friday the 13th franchise, in 2003. It was followed by A Nightmare on Elm Street 5: The Dream Child, released in 1989.

== Plot ==
A year after surviving Freddy Krueger's killing spree at Westin Hills Psychiatric Hospital, (Note: As depicted in A Nightmare on Elm Street 3: Dream Warriors (1987)) Kristen Parker, Roland Kincaid, and Joey Crusel have been released from Westin Hills and returned to their normal lives. However, when Kristen dreams that she is in Freddy's old boiler room, she summons Joey and Kincaid into the dream, fearing that Krueger might be back. Joey and Kincaid, disgruntled, insist that Freddy is gone. The next day, Kristen meets with her boyfriend, martial arts enthusiast Rick Johnson, and their friends—Rick's shy and quiet sister Alice, Sheila, an asthmatic genius, and Debbie, an athletic girl who dislikes bugs.

Kristen has become popular, while Kincaid and Joey are considered outcasts in school. Kincaid and Joey confront Kristen at school for pulling them into her dream and tell her that their days of dream hopping are over, and she might end up bringing Freddy back by mistake.

That night, Kincaid falls asleep and awakens in a junkyard, where Freddy has been accidentally resurrected. Though Kincaid puts up a good fight, unable to contact Kristen to pull him out of the nightmare, Freddy kills him. Joey is up late watching TV and listening to music but eventually falls asleep. He awakens to a Playboy model swimming in his waterbed until she morphs into Freddy, pulls him into his waterbed, killing him as well. Kristen is heartbroken to learn that Kincaid and Joey are dead, feeling guilty that she could not save them realizing Freddy is back to finish the three of them off. At dinner, she realizes with horror that her mother has put sleeping pills in her meal because Kristen has not been sleeping. She tries to resist but eventually falls asleep. As the last of the Elm Street children, Freddy taunts her into summoning one of her friends into the dream so that his torment can begin anew. She summons Alice, and Freddy throws Kristen into his boiler. Before she dies, Kristen transfers her dream power to Alice. When Alice and Rick arrive at Kristen's house, they find her bedroom on fire and discover that she has burned to death.

At school, Alice falls asleep during class and inadvertently brings Sheila into her dream. Freddy kills Sheila, making it appear like an asthma attack. Rick begins to believe Alice and has a dream in which an invisible Freddy kills him in a martial arts dojo. With each death, Alice changes—she acquires the abilities and personalities of her dead friends. Freddy targets Debbie next, transforms her into a cockroach, and crushes her in a roach motel. Trapped by Freddy in a time loop dream with her crush Dan Jordan, Alice tries to ram Freddy with her car to save Debbie but collides with a tree in reality, injuring Dan, who is rushed into surgery.

In a dream, Alice rescues Dan, but he gets injured, prompting his surgeons to wake him up when he starts bleeding out in real life. Alice now has to face Freddy alone. She uses her friends' dream powers against him. When Freddy seems to be winning, she recalls a nursery rhyme called "The Dream Master," which instructs one to show evil its reflection. She forces Freddy to face his own reflection, causing the souls within him to revolt. The strain tears him apart. Alice's friends' souls are released, leaving Freddy a hollow husk. Months later, Dan and Alice are on a date when Dan tosses a coin into a fountain. For a moment, Alice sees Freddy's reflection in the water but chooses to ignore it as they walk away.

== Cast ==
- Lisa Wilcox as Alice Johnson. Wilcox was not initially considered for the lead role of Alice (see below for more details). In this film she plays a more timid version of the character who would later return in the sequel.
- Danny Hassel as Dan Jordan. Hassell was not expecting to be cast and assumed that the producers giving his character the same name as himself meant they were not that interested in his role in the script. Nonetheless, Hassell, along with Wilcox, would return in the sequel the following year.
- Robert Englund as Freddy Krueger and nurse (with different make-up). Englund returned for his fourth appearance in the role of Krueger; the time-loop sequence of Alice and Dan trying to save Debbie is often quoted by him as his favourite in the whole series.
- Tuesday Knight as Kristen Parker. Knight assumes the role of Kristen which had been played by Patricia Arquette in the previous film. Knight would contribute the film's soundtrack and, in 2010's documentary Never Sleep Again, other cast members suggest that her prominence was the result of a personal relationship between her and director Renny Harlin, something both Harlin and Knight deny.
- Brooke Theiss as Debbie Stevens. Theiss would later star with original Elm Street star Heather Langenkamp in the ABC sitcom Just the Ten of Us. Theiss was pleased that her character later became an action figure.
- Ken Sagoes as Roland Kincaid. Sagoes returns from the previous film although he recalled in 2010 telling his friends not to buy any popcorn and go straight into the film as his onscreen appearance was minimal.
- Rodney Eastman as Joey Crusel. Eastman, like Sagoes, returns from the previous film and also meets his demise relatively early in the picture.
- Andras Jones as Rick Johnson. Jones plays Rick, the brother of Alice and boyfriend of Kristen. Jones would later recall being stalemated by the rest of the cast after shooting had completed and hinted at a possible conflict with director Renny Harlin.
- Toy Newkirk as Sheila Kopecky. Newkirk plays Sheila, a mathematics and science expert who helps Debbie with her homework. An asthmatic, she is suffocated by Krueger midway through the film. Newkirk recalled in Never Sleep Again that she was asked to redub all her lines after initial filming in order "to sound more black".
- Nicholas Mele as Mr. Dennis Johnson. Mele plays Rick and Alice's alcoholic father; his character was slated to die in this film in a cut scene where Krueger forces his head through a fridge door. The scene was cut for time constraints and Mele returned in the next film.
- Brooke Bundy as Elaine Parker. Bundy was surprised to be asked back after her character appeared to be killed by Krueger at the conclusion of the previous film; it was later suggested that this was a dream of Kristen's. Elaine inadvertently kills Kristin when she spikes her food with sleeping tablets, allowing Krueger to attack her whilst dreaming.
- Linnea Quigley as soul from Freddy's chest

Robert Shaye appears uncredited in a cameo role as Alice's teacher talking about a positive and a negative gate of dreams and Aristotle's dream philosophy with Playboy model Hope "Hope Levin" Marie Carlton appearing as the fixation of Joey's waterbed dream credited as Pin Up Girl.

== Production ==
=== Development ===
A Nightmare on Elm Street franchise originator Wes Craven presented his own pitch for the fourth Elm Street film, but producers Sara Risher and Robert Shaye turned it down, instead going with the "Dream Master" pitch as a progression of the "Dream Warriors" concept from the previous film. Risher explained that:

I approached Wes for an idea for the fourth film. I always go to Wes first each time. His idea was illogical. It was about time travel within dreams that broke all the rule of dreams. We decided not to go with that. When we decided to go with [William] Kotzwinkle's 'Dream-master' idea, which we thought was terrific, I told Wes we were doing that.

Shaye felt that Craven's idea did not have the impact the producers were looking for. Craven and his writing partner Bruce Wagner were later contacted about doing rewrites for the script, but turned down the offer as Craven felt that they should have been approached as artists of the original material. Brian Helgeland was at New Line Cinema around Christmas 1987 about a script named Highway to Hell, a pitch that was turned down by them and would not be realized until 1992; the company was desperate to get Nightmare 4 going as they lacked both a script and a director for the film at the time. Mike De Luca begged Helgeland to have a try at it and come up with a script within two weeks; he went to his parents' house and finished the script within nine days, sending it to New Line with FedEx. Helgeland's script was a rewrite of William Kotzwinkle's original script. Ken and Jim Wheat, under the pseudonym Scott Pierce, were brought in next for further polishes; the Writers Guild of America credited the shooting script to Helgeland and the Wheat brothers, with Kotzwinkle and Hedgeland receiving story credit.

In an interview with Midnight's Edge, director Tom McLoughlin said that after completing Friday the 13th Part VI: Jason Lives (1986), New Line offered him the job on The Dream Master. His one caveat was that he wanted creative control. The studio could not adhere to the demand, specifically because they had already begun filming without any director. McLoughlin said:

"When I finished Friday, I was offered Nightmare 4 and went to New Line, met with them, and I said, 'I love Freddy, I would love to do one of these, but I really want to do what I just did, where I had creative control'," he explained. "And they go, 'Well, we're already shooting.' 'What?' 'Yeah, we're already shooting, we're shooting like two different units for the visual effects' and something else, puppets or something. And I said, 'Without a director?' 'Yeah, we kind of know how we're going to make these things.' And I went, 'That's not the way I work.' So I turned it down, which of course made (Nightmare 4 director) Renny Harlin's career."

Eventually, the director's work was given to Harlin, who had previously directed only two low-budget feature films: a Finnish action film Born American in 1986 and an American horror film Prison in 1987. Rachel Talalay claims that she and the other producers felt that since the audience was so familiar with Freddy Krueger at this stage, it would be harder to replicate the scare factor of the first two films; instead they decided to continue in the same vein of A Nightmare on Elm Street 3: Dream Warriors (1987) rather than focus on pure horror. Harlin felt that Freddy had become the James Bond of the series, the one the audience roots for, saying:

We've reached a point where the audience sees Freddy as the hero. They come to these movies to hear his funny lines and see him do those amazing things. And because of that popularity, I'm faced with showing Freddy in a more heroic light and giving him more screen time. People will still fear him, but they will also be cheering him on.

Rick Johnson, played by Andras Jones, was originally slated to die in a Freddy-induced elevator accident in the dreamworld. According to the producers, this scene had to be cut for budget concern reasons and was rewritten with the infamous karate dojo scene seen in the theatrical picture.

=== Casting ===
“They asked me to come back for 4 but at that time I was starting to break into kind of meatier roles. I had just done a movie of the week about teen pregnancy called Daddy and I was really liking getting deeper with my work. I love the horror genre and the Freddy franchise but I was chomping at the bit to try other things as an actor.”

— Patricia Arquette (2017)

The role of Kristen Parker in Dream Warriors had been the debut role for Patricia Arquette, but was recast with actress Tuesday Knight for the sequel; producer Sara Risher said she was disappointed at the time that Arquette could not reprise her role, commending her as an "integral part to Nightmare 3" and as well-liked by the rest of the crew. In Assault of the Killer B's: Interviews with 20 Cult Film Actresses it is stated that "Patricia Arquette reportedly fought the [horror genre] label, turning down a hefty offer to reprise her heroine role, instead favoring more dramatic roles and becoming a respected thespian in the Hollywood community". Knight had been the first new actor to be cast for the film other than the four returnees from the previous film. Returning actors Rodney Eastman and Ken Sagoes expressed disappointment that the character of Kristen had to be recast and of the defaulted reunion with former co-star Arquette, while Knight on her part has admitted to having felt out of place due to the recasting. On the auditioning for Alice, Lisa Wilcox recalls that "I did a screen test with Tuesday Knight, who'd already been cast as Kristen Parker. We did the scene where we're sitting outside the school talking about having matching luggage. Then I did another screen test with Brooke".

Over 600 actresses auditioned for the role of Alice, which was eventually given to Wilcox. She had previously auditioned for a role in the previous film, Dream Warriors, but failed to land it. In the documentary Never Sleep Again: The Elm Street Legacy (2010), Harlin describes that he and the producers were looking for "somebody [he] could make seem timid and vulnerable in the beginning and who can then in a believable way become kind of like Sigourney Weaver in Aliens or something like that", and that "[he] found lot of sort of hardcore tough chicks but [he] could never believe they could be weak and vulnerable – then [he] found a lot of mousy girls that when they try to be tough and strong capable, they fell on their face." According to Wilcox, the casting directors failed to find the right actress initially, and so went through the pile of rejects that she had been put in. The reason for this first rejection, as she was told initially by the casting manager, was that she looked too much like "a cheerleader", and was deemed too pretty to play the part of the introverted, mousy girl Alice started off as. Wilcox then countered by toning down her looks as much as she possibly could:

I basically wimped myself out. I wore no makeup, wore my worst color (which is yellow) and just showed up looking like hell. Their reaction was, "Is that Lisa Wilcox?" After they got over their shock, they gave me the role.

Ellie Cornell has claimed that she was in line for auditioning for a lead role in the A Nightmare on Elm Street franchise in 1988. In Horror Films of the 1980s, she describes that New Line Cinema was looking for an 'Ellie Cornell prototype', a 'girl next door', but she had already landed the role of Rachel Carruthers in Halloween 4: The Return of Michael Myers (1988) shortly before the auditioning for the role in Dream Master took place. Lezlie Deane, who later starred as Tracy Swan in Freddy's Dead: The Final Nightmare (1991), auditioned for the role of Kristen in The Dream Master while having also auditioned earlier for the role of Taryn White in Dream Warriors.

=== Filming ===
The creative process was bogged down by the 1988 Writers Guild of America strike, forcing Harlin and the producers to improvise much during the filming. Wilcox and Jones wrote their own dialogue for Alice and Rick after the death of Kristen while watching their old home videos, such as "I saw it happen in my dream". Many of the nightmare scenes were made up from ideas that Harlin came up with rather than from the writers' script.

This film features the car junkyard set from Dream Warriors. This set was conceptualized by production designer Mick Strawn, who worked as art director and handled effects on the previous film. Strawn also came up with the truck crash scene and the kaleidoscope hallway. The junkyard set is the only set used in more than one film (3 & 4). The set was built and filmed at the old Los Angeles City Dump (Puente Hills Landfill) at 13130 Crossroads Pkwy S, City of Industry, CA 91746. The landfill closed in Oct 31, 2013.

According to Never Sleep Again producer Rachel Talalay recounted a meeting between Harlin and James Cameron; Cameron enquired how Freddy was being resurrected for this film to which Harlin replied "a dog pisses fire".

== Music ==
A Nightmare On Elm Street 4: The Dream Master - Original Motion Picture Soundtrack

Film score by Craig Safan
- Released: November 1, 1988
- Genre: Film score
- Length: 41:51
- Label: Varese Sarabande
- Producer: Craig Safan

Craig Safan chronology
Stand and Deliver (1988)	A Nightmare On Elm Street 4: The Dream Master - Original Motion Picture Soundtrack (1988)	Son of the Morning Star (1992)

A Nightmare on Elm Street 4: The Dream Master

Soundtrack album by Various artists
- Released: November 1, 1988
- Label: Chrysalis
- Producer: Kevin Benson (for New Line Cinema)

Professional ratings
Review scores
Source	Rating
Allmusic	3/5 stars

=== Film score ===
There are two different releases of the music featured in the film. One is the music score, composed by Craig Safan, while the other was a soundtrack album with mostly rock or pop-oriented songs by various artists. The film score by Safan along with every other score in the film series was re-released in 2017 on the label Death Waltz Recording Company in an 8-CD box set named A Nightmare On Elm Street: Box Of Souls.

=== Soundtrack album ===
There were ten songs on the soundtrack album.

1. Sea Hags – "Under the Night Stars"
2. The Angels – "Standing Over You"
3. Go West – "Don't Be Afraid of Your Dreams" (Played over the end credits.)
4. Divinyls – "Back to the Wall" (Played while Kristen is driving to Rick and Alice's house.)
5. Jimmy Davis & Junction – "My Way Or The Highway"
6. Vinnie Vincent Invasion – "Love Kills" (Played in the jukebox, after hearing about Joey and Kincaid's death.)
7. Vigil – "Therapist"
8. Blondie – "Rip Her to Shreds"
9. Love/Hate – "Angel"
10. Craig Safan – "Resurrection" (This a suite from his instrumental score.)

=== Other songs ===
Nine songs were played during the film that were not on the soundtrack album. Tuesday Knight, who acted in the film, contributed the song Nightmare to the film's soundtrack. She did not know until she watched Dream Master in the theater that it been chosen to be the actual title/intro song. Nightmare does not appear on the official compilation released for the film. The master record of this song, previously thought for many years to have been lost or destroyed, has since been "uncovered in a box deep within the bowels of Warner Brothers" according to Knight.

1. Tuesday Knight – "Nightmare" (Played at the opening credits.)
2. Dramarama – "Anything, Anything (I'll Give You)" (Played during Rick and later Alice's martial arts training montages.)
3. The Fat Boys – "Are You Ready for Freddy" (Played over the end credits.)
4. Billy Idol – "Fatal Charm" (Played during Joey's final nightmare.)
5. Joe Lamont – "Pride and Joy" (Played on the jukebox while Debbie serves Dan.)
6. Nick Gilder & Time Machine – "Big House"
7. Sinéad O'Connor (featuring MC Lyte) – "I Want Your (Hands on Me) (Remix)" (Played during Debbie's death and end credits.)
8. Blondie – "In the Flesh" (Played on the jukebox when Dan comes to the diner to talk to Alice about Freddy.)
9. Girl Talk – "Baila Baila" (Played during Debbie's arrival at school.)

Producer Rachel Talalay would recall in 2010 that the inclusion of Sinéad O'Connor's song, "I Want Your (Hands on Me)" (from her debut album The Lion and the Cobra), was a contentious issue as the licence fee for the song was twice that of the others due to O'Connor's emerging success on MTV; producer Bob Shaye eventually relented and the song was included twice in the picture. An instrumental, sped up, more rock-like version of Go West's Don't Be Afraid of Your Dreams is played during Alice's final mirror scene, gearing up for battle against Freddy; this version is commonly referred to as "Alice Gets Ready" by fans, and while this instrumental was never included in any other official media than the film itself, it has since been recreated unofficially with the aid of AI tools.

=== Music videos ===
Since the Nightmare on Elm Street series was popular, many of the songs on the soundtrack had music videos:

- The Fat Boys' "Are You Ready for Freddy" music video featured Robert Englund. The story line of the video is that one of the Fat Boys inherits the Elm Street house on the condition that he has to stay in it for the night. The video includes Freddy rapping and audio of Heather Langenkamp's line "don't fall asleep" from the original film. This music video was on the bonus disc The Nightmare Series Encyclopedia of The Nightmare on Elm Street Collection, released by New Line Platinum Series on September 21, 1999.
- Vinnie Vincent Invasion's "Love Kills" music video features scenes from the film.

== Release ==
New Line Cinema initially planned to release A Nightmare on Elm Street 4: The Dream Master in the autumn of 1988, but moved the release forward after deciding that the film would perform better during the summer. It was consequently rushed to completion for an August 19, 1988 release, becoming the first film in the Nightmare on Elm Street series to receive a summer release.

New Line spent approximately $1.5 million on advertising and between $7 million and $8 million on release prints, making it the company's most expensive release at the time. The distributor worked with exhibitors to secure as many screens as possible and selected a late-summer opening after most major-studio releases had already debuted, while still allowing the film to attract teenage audiences during their summer vacation. The film ultimately opened in 1,765 theaters and earned $12.8 million during its opening weekend, at the time the highest opening-weekend gross for an independently distributed film.

=== Promotional music dispute ===
During the film's development, Jive Records proposed "A Nightmare on My Street" by DJ Jazzy Jeff & The Fresh Prince as a promotional song for the film. New Line instead commissioned The Fat Boys to record the officially licensed "Are You Ready for Freddy", which featured Robert Englund as Freddy Krueger.

Jive nevertheless released "A Nightmare on My Street" in April 1988, and the song subsequently reached number 15 on the Billboard Hot 100. After learning that an accompanying music video featuring a character resembling Freddy Krueger was being prepared for broadcast on MTV, New Line filed suit against Jive, Zomba Music and the performers, alleging copyright and trademark infringement. In August 1988, a federal judge granted New Line a preliminary injunction preventing release of the video. The dispute was later resolved through a confidential settlement; the video remained unreleased, while copies of the album carried a disclaimer stating that the song was not affiliated with the Nightmare on Elm Street films.

== Reception ==
=== Box office ===
The film was released on August 19, 1988, on 1,765 theaters in the United States and Canada. The film ranked number one on its opening weekend and grossed $12,883,403, the biggest opening for an independent release at the time and the first film launched that late during summer to gross more than $10 million. On the second weekend, the film still ranked number one and grossed $6,989,358. It was in first place on the third weekend, then at second, fourth, and sixth in the next three weeks until it dropped out from the top ten list on the seventh weekend at number eleven. The film grossed $49,369,899 at the US box office and was the 19th-highest-grossing film of 1988. It was the highest-grossing Nightmare on Elm Street film until Freddy vs. Jason was released in 2003. It is currently the third-highest-grossing film in the Nightmare on Elm Street franchise. In the UK, the film spent two weeks at the top of the box office.

=== Critical response ===
"Nightmare 4 contains my favorite sequence in the entire franchise, and I'm not even in it! Alice is locking up for the night at the Crave Inn diner—get it? ... Crave Inn? ... Craven? ... Wes Craven? ... Weren't we clever?—then she and Dan walk out to his truck, open the doors, and get in, and then ... the sequence repeats ... and repeats and repeats in a time-disorienting, continuous loop. The first time I saw it, I was spooked because it reminded me of how my nightmares tended to function. That repeating exit was the most hypnotic, disturbing, and accurate depiction of a dream I'd ever seen."

— Robert Englund (2009) on the timeloop scene with Alice and Dan

The review aggregator website Rotten Tomatoes reports a 56% approval rating based on 34 reviews, and an average rating of 5.00/10. The site's critical consensus reads, "A Nightmare on Elm Street 4: The Dream Master marks a relative high point in this franchise's bumpy creative journey, although the original remains far superior." On Metacritic the film has a weighted average score of 56 out of 100, based on 10 critics, indicating "mixed or average" reviews.

Upon its release, critic Kevin Thomas of the Los Angeles Times praised the story line, performances, and special effects, stating that the film: "is by far the best of the series, a superior horror picture that balances wit and gore with imagination and intelligence. It very effectively mirrors the anxieties of the teen-age audience for which it is primarily intended." Thomas then went on to commend Wilcox's portrayal of Alice, stating,

It matters not to Freddy that these kids' parents had nothing to do with his torching. In essence, however, the film is about how a shy, lovely teenager named Alice (Lisa Wilcox) with a widowed alcoholic father gradually gathers the courage to assert herself in taking on Freddy—and in the process wins the love of the handsomest boy (Danny Hassel) in her school. If the nightmare sequences are impressive with their Inferno-like images, the film's young cast is no less so. Nightmare 4 provides Wilcox with an exceptionally challenging screen debut.

Robert Englund has called The Dream Master one of his favorites in the entire franchise, and for this—among other things—he has thanked Harlin:

I like my performance in Part 4, the Renny Harlin film. Renny left me alone and he understood that Freddy only exists in this dream landscape, this sort of a landscape of the mind, of the dream, of the nightmare. And so, he's not real. He's been conjured by the subconscious of whoever is having the nightmare, and so it can be a little stylized.

While criticizing the plot for being derivative of the previous films, critic John H. Richardson of Los Angeles Daily News described the film's special effects as "downright brilliant, matching and even improving on the amazing effects in A Nightmare on Elm Street 3: Dream Warriors."

=== Accolades ===
- 1990 Saturn Awards
  - Best Director – Renny Harlin (nomination)
  - Best Horror Film (nomination)
  - Best Supporting Actor – Robert Englund (nomination)
- Fantasporto Awards 1989
  - International Fantasy Film Award for Best Film – Renny Harlin (nomination)
- 9th Golden Raspberry Awards
  - Razzie Award for Worst Original Song – Vigil for the song "Therapist" (nomination)
- Sitges - Catalan International Film Festival
  - Best Special Effects (winner)
  - Best Film (nomination)
- Young Artist Awards
  - Teenage Choice for Best Horror Motion Picture (winner)
  - Best Young Actor in a Horror or Mystery Motion Picture – Rodney Eastman (nomination)
  - Best Young Actor in a Horror or Mystery Motion Picture – Andras Jones (nomination)
  - Best Young Actress in a Horror or Mystery Motion Picture – Brooke Theiss (nomination)

== See also ==
- List of ghost films
- List of monster movies
