= Tag: The Assassination Game =

TAG: The Assassination Game
- Theatrical release poster
- Directed by: Nick Castle
- Written by: Nick Castle
- Produced by: Dan Rosenthal; Peter Rosten
- Starring: Robert Carradine; Linda Hamilton; Kristine DeBell; Perry Lang; John Mengatti; Michael Winslow; Frazer Smith; Xander Berkeley; Bruce Abbott
- Cinematography: Willy Kurant
- Edited by: Tom Walls
- Music by: Craig Safan
- Distributed by: New World Pictures
- Release date: April 23, 1982
- Running time: 90 minutes
- Country: United States
- Language: English
- Budget: $3 million

TAG: The Assassination Game, also known as Everybody Gets It in the End, is a 1982 American action comedy film written and directed by Nick Castle and starring Robert Carradine and Linda Hamilton in her first feature film starring role. This is also Forest Whitaker's film debut. It is based on the game Assassin.

== Plot ==
At an American college, a group of students play a game with suction cup dart toy guns similar to The 10th Victim where a pair of students are assigned to "kill" the other one first by shooting him with a dart. One student, Loren Gersh (Bruce Abbott) lives purely to play the game. His expertise in "killing" all of his opponents and not being "killed" himself, making him a renowned master.

When one of his cringing victims accidentally drops his dart gun, it goes off and hits Gersh, "killing" him. Faced with the embarrassment of losing his reputation by a geek getting lucky, Gersh has a mental breakdown. He kills his opponent with a real gun, setting him on the goal to use actual weapons and real killing from then on. His opponents in the game are unaware of Gersh's new rules.

As his hold on sanity continues to deteriorate, Gersh's demeanor and wardrobe slowly transforms from an average student to a James Bond-type assassin.

== Cast ==
- Robert Carradine as Alex Marsh
- Linda Hamilton as Susan Swayze
- Kristine DeBell as Nancy McCauley
- Perry Lang as Frank English
- John Mengatti as Randy Simonetti
- Michael Winslow as Gowdy
- Frazer Smith as Nick Carpenter
- Xander Berkeley as Connally
- Bruce Abbott as Loren Gersh
- Ivan Bonar as Patterson
- Scott Dunlop as Wallace
- Jim Greenleaf as Swanson
- Isabel Cooley as Prof. Wadsworth
- Charlene Nelson as Charlene
- Forest Whitaker as Gowdy's Bodyguard

== Production notes ==
One of Gersh's planned victims is Susan Swayze, played by Linda Hamilton. The two performers met on the set of the film and subsequently married.
