= Vigil (band) =

American alternative rock band

- Origin: Baltimore, Maryland, United States
- Genres: Alternative rock
- Years active: 1986-1990
- Labels: CBS, Chrysalis
- Past members: Jo Connor; Andy R X Factor; Gregg Maizel

Vigil was an American 1980s alternative rock band based in Baltimore, Maryland, United States.

== Biography ==
The band originally formed under the name Here Today as part of Baltimore's alternative/gothic music scene in the early 1980s. Here Today's 1983 "Whistle in the Yard" 12" single drew some attention from CBS Records, and they were signed in 1984 by CBS A&R rep Howard Thompson. Vigil recorded half an album produced by John Anthony and the band's manager, Sam Prager, before Thompson departed CBS. Without Thompson's stewardship, Vigil agreed to a buyout of the band's contract and was quickly signed by Chrysalis Records. In 1987, they released their eponymous debut album. The band toured in support of this album as the opening act for the Stranglers.

In 1988, Vigil returned to the studio to record a second album, tentatively titled Escape Artist, but were dropped by Chrysalis. One track from this period, "Therapist", was released on the soundtrack to A Nightmare on Elm Street 4: The Dream Master.

In 1990 Escape Artist was retitled On to Beggar and Bitter Things and released on 'Snuff Tapes.

In 2023, the band's releases started appearing on streaming services.

Connor later formed the Jo Connor Band, and in 2023 his band JC and the Buddagong released an 8-song LP "Matchmaker."

== Band members ==
- Gregg Maizel (bass)
- Jo Connor (vocals, guitar, and keyboards)
- Andy R (guitars)
- X Factor (drums)

== Discography ==
=== Studio albums ===
- Vigil (1987, Chrysalis Records)
- Escape Artist (1989, unreleased)
- On to Beggar and Bitter Things (1990 'snuff Tapes) (cassette only version of Escape Artist)

=== Singles ===
- "I Am Waiting" 12" single (1986, Chrysalis)
- "Until the Seasons..." 7" promo single (1987, Chrysalis)
- "White Magic Spell" 12" promo single (1987, Chrysalis)

=== as Here Today ===
- "The It" 7" single (Home Fry Records HT-2)
- "Whistle in the Yard" 12" single (Kat Records)
