= Meatballs Part II =

1984 film by Ken Wiederhorn

- Theatrical release poster
- Directed by: Ken Wiederhorn
- Written by: Bruce Franklin Singer (credited as Bruce Singer)
- Story by: Martin Kitrosser; Carol Watson
- Produced by: Lisa Barsamian (Executive producer); Tony Bishop; Stephen Poe
- Starring: Richard Mulligan; Hamilton Camp; John Mengatti; Kim Richards; Archie Hahn; Misty Rowe; John Larroquette
- Cinematography: Donald M. Morgan
- Edited by: George Berndt
- Music by: Ken Harrison
- Distributed by: Tri-Star Pictures
- Release date: July 27, 1984
- Running time: 87 minutes
- Countries: United States; Canada
- Language: English
- Box office: $5.4 million

Meatballs Part II is a 1984 comedy film and the first sequel to the 1979 film Meatballs. The film stars Richard Mulligan, Hamilton Camp, John Mengatti, Kim Richards, Archie Hahn, Misty Rowe, and John Larroquette, and was directed by Ken Wiederhorn. The screenplay for the film was written by Bruce Franklin Singer based on a story by Martin Kitrosser, Carol Watson and Martin Lerman.

== Plot ==
The owner of Camp Sasquatch, Giddy, tries to keep his camp open after Hershy, the owner of Camp Patton, located just across the lake, wants to buy the entire lake for Camp Patton. Giddy suggests settling the issue with the traditional end-of-the-summer boxing match over rights to the lake. A tough, inner city punk named Flash is at Camp Sasquatch for community service as a counselor-in-training. Flash is recruited to box in order to save Sasquatch. Cheryl, a naive teen on whom Flash has set his sights, has never seen a "pinky", so her fellow teenage girl campers arrange for her to see a man naked. Meanwhile, the campers try to hide an alien from another planet who has been dropped off by his parents to learn Earth culture. He is nicknamed "Meathead" by the kids after repeating one of them saying "Me, Ted".

== Cast ==
- Richard Mulligan as Coach Giddy
- Hamilton Camp as Colonel Jack 'Batjack' Hershy
- John Mengatti as Armand 'Flash' Carducci
- Kim Richards as Cheryl
- Archie Hahn as Jamie / Voice of Meathead
- Misty Rowe as Fanny
- John Larroquette as Lieutenant Felix Foxglove
- Paul Reubens as Albert
- Joe Nipote as 'Boomer'
- Jason Hervey as Tommy
- Ralph Seymour as Eddie
- Elayne Boosler as Mother
- Nancy Glass as Daughter
- Felix Silla as 'Meathead'
- Joaquin Martinez as Chief Rawhide
- Blackie Dammett as Sergeant Paladin
- Donald Gibb as 'Mad Dog'
- Jason Luque as Jai Styxxx
- Martin Lerman as Moishe/Voice Of God
- P.J. Koster as Paul "Super Diabedo" The Farter
- Ellen Lichman as the Bridge Troll

== Reception ==
Meatballs Part II grossed $2,515,268 the first weekend. The film grossed $5,410,972 domestically overall. Lerman contends that $5,000,000 is still owed to him.

=== Critical response ===
Critic Lawrence Van Gelder of The New York Times wrote in his review: "Trailing bits of Rocky and E.T. and using a plot device from the 1983 film Screwballs, which itself aspired to be Porky's, Meatballs Part II shares with 1979's Meatballs not much more than a summer camp setting. This time - amid the efforts of two senior counselors to find sexual privacy, amid prurience and budding romance involving an innocent blonde preppy and a young punk given a choice of a counselor's job or reform school, and amid the efforts of some of the little campers to harbor an extraterrestrial - the future of Camp Sasquatch is in peril.

Rotten Tomatoes lists only two critics' reviews, both of which are negative. Lawrence Van Gelder of the New York Times said, "Pallid writing, awkward acting, familiar situations and tired jokes make the morons, wimps and losers of Meatballs Part II easy to pass up." TV Guide reported, "The difference between this movie and the original is Bill Murray, whose charm gave the first film its best moments and raised the mediocre plot into something mindless but sweet." Meanwhile, 675 users have scored the movie with an average of 2.5 out of 5; only 23% of those users reported liking "Meatballs Part II."

== Release ==
Meatballs Part II was released in theaters on July 27, 1984. The film was released on DVD on March 4, 2011, by Sony Pictures Home Entertainment.

== Sources ==
- Pittsburgh Press Staff (July 27, 1984). "Meatballs Part II". Pittsburgh Press. Pittsburgh: E. W. Scripps Company (1924–1992)
  Block Communications (2011–present). p. 26.(subscription required)
