= Crushin' =

Studio album by Fat Boys
- Released: August 14, 1987
- Studios: D&D; Digitel Computer Music; INS; QUAD; Ralston; The Sound Solution; Soundworks C Unique, New York City
- Genre: Hip hop
- Length: 43:03
- Labels: Tin Pan Apple/Polydor; 831 948
- Producers: Fat Boys, the Latin Rascals, Gary Rottger, Eddison Electrik, Van Gibbs

Fat Boys chronology
Big & Beautiful (1986)	Crushin' (1987)	Coming Back Hard Again (1988)

Crushin' is the fourth studio album by the hip hop group Fat Boys, released in 1987. It was their breakout album, charting in the top 10 on both Billboard Pop and R&B album charts and selling more than a million copies by the end of the year. It includes a cover version of the Surfaris' hit "Wipe Out" with the Beach Boys singing back-up vocals. The cover made it to No. 12 on the Billboard chart, and No. 10 on the corresponding R&B listing. The album peaked at No. 49 on the UK Albums Chart.

The group supported the album with the Wipeout Tour, which included Salt-N-Pepa, Heavy D, 4 by Four, and Dana Dane.

== Production ==
"Protect Yourself/My Nuts" promotes the use of condoms during sex. "Falling in Love" was inspired by Darren Robinson's experience with infidelity.

== Critical reception ==
Professional ratings
Review scores
Source	Rating
AllMusic	4/5 stars
Robert Christgau	B
Los Angeles Times	1/4 stars
(The New) Rolling Stone Album Guide	3.5/5 stars

The Los Angeles Times determined that "if you like your rap riffs recycled, your messages simplistic and your rhythms hard and good-to-go, you just might be satisfied by the offerings of this portly trio." The Richmond Times-Dispatch wrote that "the synthetic drums alone don't satisfy anymore, and there aren't enough of those delightful verbal sound effects to flesh out the songs." The Times opined that the album employs "just the right mix of spring-heeled rhythm tracks and jokey, 'get busy' declamations." Trouser Press deemed the album "a mild but winning party collection of mainstream cuts with boundless entertainment spirit and unfailing good humor."

== Track listing ==
1. "Crushin'" – 4:46
2. "Protect Yourself/My Nuts" – 4:08
3. "Rock Ruling" – 3:50
4. "Making Noise" – 3:40
5. "Boys Will Be Boys" – 4:39
6. "Falling in Love" – 5:03
7. "Fat Boys Dance" – 3:42
8. "Wipeout" featuring the Beach Boys – 4:32
9. "Between the Sheets" – 4:24
10. "Hell, No!" – 4:19

== Charts ==
=== Weekly charts ===
Chart (1987)	Peak position
US Billboard 200	8
US Top R&B/Hip-Hop Albums (Billboard)	4

=== Year-end charts ===
Chart (1987)	Position
US Billboard 200	65
US Top R&B/Hip-Hop Albums (Billboard)	26

=== Singles ===
Year	Single	Chart positions	
Year	Single	US Pop	US R&B
1987	"Wipe Out"	12	10
1987	"Falling in Love"	-	16
