= Jeff Kutash =

American dancer and choreographer (born 1945)

- Born: April 8, 1945 (age 81); Cleveland, Ohio, U.S.
- Known for: Dance and choreography
- Movement: Street dance
- Awards: Emmy; Golden Globe

Jeff Kutash (born 1945) is an American dancer and choreographer.

== Early life ==
Jeff was born in Cleveland, Ohio. As a teen, he was a middleweight Golden Gloves boxer.

== Career ==
Jeff Kutash began his entertainment career in Cleveland, Ohio, as a dancer/choreographer of the musical variety show Upbeat, which was inducted into the National Rhythm & Blues Hall of Fame in 2013. He has choreographed for James Brown, Otis Redding, Jackie Wilson, John Travolta, Muhammad Ali, Michael Jackson, Bette Midler, Cher and Jerry Lewis. He served as a Live Show Attraction Director for Elvis Presley, Dick Clark, Frank Sinatra, Dean Martin, Sammy Davis Jr. and Tom Jones.

Kutash created Las Vegas' first water show, Splash, which was a long-running hit for 20 years and paved the way for O. His unique brand of "Street Dancing" is credited with invigorating Las Vegas' shows for a younger audience, innovating a format that had been held by French-themed revues that filled the nightclubs.

== Personal life ==
Jeff currently resides in Las Vegas, NV. In September 1997, he testified in a trial denying accusations of bribing a judge for a favorable outcome concerning his show Splash in Las Vegas. He is divorced with one daughter, and has a long-term girlfriend from Chattanooga, Tennessee.
