= Sal Abbatiello =

American and italian Citizen music executive

- Born: September 17, 1952 (age 72); New York City, New York, U.S.
- Occupation: Music executive

Sal Abbatiello (born 1952) is an American music promoter and dance club owner.

Abbatiello created and produced the freestyle, urban/dance-pop trio, The Cover Girls, whose hits include "Show Me" and "Wishing on a Star". Abbatiello is also the owner of Fever Records.

Abbatiello played himself in the 1985 film Krush Groove.
