= Knights of the City =

1986 film directed by Dominic Orlando

- Theatrical release poster
- Directed by: Dominic Orlando
- Written by: Leon Isaac Kennedy
- Produced by: Michael Franzese; Jerry Zimmerman; Leon Isaac Kennedy; John C. Strong III
- Starring: Leon Isaac Kennedy; Nicholas Campbell; John Mengatti; Janine Turner; Stoney Jackson
- Cinematography: Rolf Kestermann
- Edited by: Nicholas C. Smith; John A. O'Connor
- Music by: Misha Segal
- Distributed by: New World Pictures
- Release date: February 14, 1986
- Running time: 87 minutes
- Country: United States
- Language: English
- Box office: $601,451

Knights of the City (originally Cry of the City) is a 1986 action adventure film starring Leon Isaac Kennedy, Nicholas Campbell, John Mengatti and Janine Turner. It was directed by Dominic Orlando and written by Leon Isaac Kennedy. Mobster Michael Franzese was a producer on the film.

== Plot ==
The Royals are a multi-ethnic street gang led by Troy (Leon Isaac Kennedy). Troy is aware that a life on the mean streets can only lead to a dead end. Therefore, he has been trying through his own determination and musical ambitions to motivate the band towards a serious goal as professional performers. However within the gang there are those, specifically Joey (Nicholas Campbell), who wish to derail Troy's plan, claiming that their performing is distracting them from their business in the streets.

Meanwhile, McGruder (Floyd Levine), a corrupt police officer, is making life even harder for the Royals, as are the Mechanics, a rival gang trying to take over the Royals' territory. The Mechanics have been selling bad drugs and are also trying to extort protection money from merchants in the Royals neighborhood. A violent face-off between the two gangs results in only the Royals being jailed as it is discovered McGruder is being paid off by the Mechanics. In jail, the Royals use their time to rehearse their songs.

A drunken inmate, Mr. Delamo (Michael Ansara), is impressed and offers his assistance, telling them that he owns Twilight Records. Dubious but curious, the Royals visit Delamo upon release from jail only to be rebuffed by his yuppie assistant and daughter, Brooke (Janine Turner). The Royals leave behind a recording of their music and storm out of the office.

After listening to the cassette, Brooke decides to bring the band to her father's attention. He agrees with her that they are talented, but unpolished. Unable to locate the Royals, Brooke gets the idea to stage a talent contest for local performers, claiming that there must be other talented bands out there as well. Again her father agrees - but for another reason - the contest will impress local politicians and the stockholders by the nature of its benevolence and the anticipated effect it will have on neighborhood morale.

He further stipulates that any contestants that get into trouble with police will be disqualified. Therefore, the mayor's office officially supports the contest as well. The contest galvanizes the community, thus reducing street violence and crime. The Royals concentrate on their music and less on the street, Delamo's profile in the community is boosted, and Troy and Brooke begin to fall in love.

The Mechanics, in the meantime, gear up to take over business in the Royals' neighborhood. Troy restrains the Royals from retaliating as he fears trouble will exclude them from the contest. Delamo also threatens Troy that a continued liaison with his daughter will result in serious problems for Troy. To prove his point, Delamo calls on his well-positioned contacts to exert pressure on Troy.

Troy, however, will do nothing to risk disqualification. He is convinced the Royals will win the contest. Even when Brooke decides not to see Troy until after the contest, he contains his anger and focuses all his energy into his music. It pays off, as the Royals do indeed win the contest, and the grand prize of a recording contract. Victors, the Royals' jubilation is cut short when the Mechanics savagely kill one of the Royal's girlfriends. Free to react, the Royals enter into battle with the Mechanics, ultimately vanquishing them. Their dignity preserved and their future brighter, the Royals look ahead to a new life in their city.

== Cast ==
- Leon Isaac Kennedy as Troy
- Nicholas Campbell as Joey
- John Mengatti as "Mookie"
- Stoney Jackson as Eddie
- Dino Henderson as Dino
- Curtis Lema as "Ramrod"
- Mr. Freeze as "Mr. Freeze" (credited as Marc Lemberger)
- Jeff Moldovan as Carlos
- Sonny Anthony as Sonny
- Jay Amor as "Red Cap"
- Eddie Guy as Eddie
- Peter Nicholas as "Hairboy"
- Stan Ward as "Buddha"
- James Reese as "Alien"
- John Franzese as "Pharaoh"
- Antone Corona as "Eyepatch"
- Floyd Levine as McGruder
- Michael Ansara as Mr. Delamo
- Dario Carnevale as Dario
- Wendy Barry as Jasmine
- Olga Ruiz as Joey's Girl
- Katie Lauren as Baby Jane
- Leslie Wanger as Girl In Disco
- Smokey Robinson as Himself
- Jessie Diaz as Jessie
- Gustavo Rodriguez as T.K.
- Kurtis Blow as Himself
- Janine Turner as Brooke Delamo
- Jeff Kutash as "Flash"
- Camille Franzese as Beverly (credited as Cammy Garcia)
- Heather Lazlo as Brooke's Girl Friend
- Michelle Garcia as Juliette
- Harry Wayne Casey as Himself (credited as K.C.)
- Deney Terrio as Himself (credited as Denny Terrio)
- Nancy Raffa as Mrs. Delamo
- Christina Wilfong as Delamo Daughter
- Fast Break as Himself

== Production ==
The film was originally going to be called Cry of the City as it was being filmed in the Spring of 1984. It was produced by a now-ex-mob captain, Michael Franzese. It was filmed in various locations in Dade and Broward counties including Miami, Ft. Lauderdale and Hollywood, Florida. The film was held back for over a year before its release as Knights of the City in 1986 by New World Pictures.

Shannon's "Let the Music Play" is played during the opening scene. Additional soundtrack songs include music from Kurtis Blow, The Fat Boys, and Harry Wayne Casey, all of whom also appear as themselves in the film. The contest hosts are Jeff Kutash and Smokey Robinson.
