= Coming Back Hard Again =

Studio album by Fat Boys
- Released: 1988
- Genre: Hip hop
- Label: Tin Pan Apple/Polydor
- Producer: Latin Rascals

Fat Boys chronology
Crushin' (1987)	Coming Back Hard Again (1988)	On and On (1989)

Coming Back Hard Again is an album by the American hip hop trio Fat Boys, released in 1988.

The album peaked at No. 33 on the Billboard 200. It peaked at No. 98 on the UK Albums Chart.

== Production ==
Chubby Checker appears on the Fat Boys' version of "The Twist". "Are You Ready for Freddy" was among the many late-1980s rap songs about A Nightmare on Elm Street. The album was produced by the Latin Rascals.

== Critical reception ==
Professional ratings
Review scores
Source	Rating
AllMusic	3/5 stars
Robert Christgau	C+
The Encyclopedia of Popular Music	3/5 stars
Los Angeles Times	3/4 stars
The Philadelphia Inquirer	2/4 stars
(The New) Rolling Stone Album Guide	3/5 stars

The Orlando Sentinel wrote: "'Jellyroll' and 'Big Daddy' are two of the better raps. The former sings the praises of pastry (then again, maybe not) while 'Big Daddy' boasts a steady reggae beat and alternates between straight rapping and Jamaican- style toasting." The Los Angeles Times called the album "highly enjoyable nonsense," writing that "you can knock the Fat Boys as lyricists—some of their songs are a bit too silly—but you can't rap their rhythms, which are among the catchiest in the genre." The Philadelphia Inquirer thought that "the straightforward rap songs, such as 'Rock the House, Y'all' and the title song, are pretty good, but the novelty songs wear thin very quickly."

AllMusic wrote that "the Fat Boys' strength remained novelty numbers and weight-based raps like 'Big Daddy' and 'Pig Feet'."

== Track listing ==
No.	Title	Length
1.	"The Twist" (with Chubby Checker)	4:05
2.	"Rock the House, Y'all"	3:20
3.	"We Can Do This"	4:10
4.	"Back and Forth"	3:15
5.	"Jellyroll"	3:20
6.	"Big Daddy"	3:40
7.	"Coming Back Hard Again"	3:20
8.	"Louie, Louie"	4:05
9.	"Are You Ready for Freddy"	4:05
10.	"All Day Lover"	4:00
11.	"Powerlord"	3:00
12.	"Pig Feet"	3:30
