= Krush Groove =

1985 American film by Michael Schultz

- Theatrical release poster
- Directed by: Michael Schultz
- Written by: Ralph Farquhar
- Produced by: Michael Schultz; George Jackson; Russell Simmons
- Starring: Sheila E.; Run-D.M.C.; The Fat Boys; Kurtis Blow; Blair Underwood; New Edition
- Cinematography: Ernest Dickerson
- Edited by: Jerry Bixman; Conrad M. Gonzalez
- Music by: David Lombard
- Color process: Technicolor
- Distributed by: Warner Bros.
- Release date: October 25, 1985
- Running time: 97 minutes
- Country: United States
- Language: English
- Budget: $3 million
- Box office: $11 million

Krush Groove is a 1985 American musical comedy-drama film distributed by Warner Bros. Pictures that was written by Ralph Farquhar and directed by Michael Schultz (who also produced the movie, along with George Jackson and Doug McHenry). This film is loosely based on the early days of Def Jam Recordings and up-and-coming record producer Russell Simmons (renamed Russell Walker in the film), portrayed by Blair Underwood in his feature film debut. Simmons was the film's co-producer and story consultant; he also had a cameo in the film as a club owner named Crocket.

== Plot ==
Russell Walker has signed all of the hottest acts to his Krush Groove record label, including Run-D.M.C., Dr. Jeckyll & Mr. Hyde, and Kurtis Blow. Rick Rubin produces their records. When Run-D.M.C. has a hit record and Russell doesn't have the money to press records, he borrows money from a street hustler. At the same time, Russell and his brother Run are both competing for the heart of R&B singer-percussionist Sheila E. Also appearing in the film are LL Cool J, Beastie Boys, New Edition, The Fat Boys and some of their songs, as well as others from Chaka Khan, Debbie Harry and the Gap Band. Members of the R&B group Full Force also make a cameo in the film as bodyguards.

== Cast ==
The following appeared as themselves, except where noted:

- Blair Underwood as Russell Walker
- Sheila E.
- Joseph Simmons as Run
- Run-DMC (Run, Darryl McDaniels, Jam Master Jay)
- The Fat Boys (Prince Markie Dee, Kool Rock Ski, The Human Beat Box)
- Kurtis Blow
- New Edition (Ralph Tresvant, Bobby Brown, Michael Bivins, Ronnie DeVoe, Ricky Bell)
- Beastie Boys
- LL Cool J
- Russell Simmons as Crocket
- Richard Gant as Jay B.
- Lisa Gay Hamilton as Aisha
- Rick Rubin
- Nayobe
- Vicky Ruane as Girl Friday
- Dr. Jeckyll & Mr. Hyde (Andre Harrell and Alonzo Brown)
- Brian "B-Fine" and Paul Anthony George of Full Force as Jay B.'s Bodyguards
- Sal Abbatiello

Chris Rock makes an uncredited appearance as a man standing next to a phone during the fight in the club. Dr. Know of the Bad Brains also makes an uncredited appearance standing in the background during the club fight scene. Kara Vallow appears uncredited as a hip-hop dancer. Coati Mundi was seen uncredited as a record shop owner. Frank Santopadre makes an uncredited appearance as a Hasidic student walking down a sidewalk. George Godfrey makes an uncredited appearance as someone in the recording area of a music studio giving a High Five.

== Differences between the film and reality ==
Krush Groove is based on the inception of the Def Jam Recordings label and the hardships that artists Run-D.M.C. and Russell Simmons faced to become successful. Simmons began his career trying to get his company Rush Management up and running. However, in the movie, he is shown as already being teamed up with producer Rick Rubin to form Def Jam, referred to as Krush Groove Records in the film. In reality, the label was started by Rubin in 1984 in his college dorm at New York University. Larry Smith was the producer of Run-D.M.C.'s first two albums Run-D.M.C. and King of Rock, despite them being credited to Rubin, who produced the group's third album, Raising Hell.

Later on, the team was joined by its first popular teen sensation, LL Cool J, who plays a very small role in the movie at the age of 17. Playing himself, LL Cool J is discovered through his piece "I Can't Live Without My Radio", which is performed at an audition in front of Dr. Jekcyll & Mr. Hyde, Jam Master Jay, DMC and Rubin in the latter's apartment. In reality, LL Cool J was discovered in Rubin's apartment but not through an audition. While going through a box of demos, Beastie Boys member Ad-Rock stumbled across LL's demo tape. With this, he produced a beat and co-wrote "I Need a Beat" with LL and Rubin, which launched both of their careers, which allowed the Def Jam label to take off. The song "I Can't Live Without My Radio" was made for the movie as a way for LL Cool J to star in it. However, this song was also one of the hit songs on his debut album Radio.

The Fat Boys were the first group to showcase a human beat box while rhyming. In the movie, the group originally referred to itself as the Disco Three. It was not until a scene in an Italian buffet, where the three boys took the phrase all you can eat to the next level by eating everything. When the group realized that they were really fat, they decided to give themselves the name Fat Boys. In reality, the name Fat Boys was suggested by the group's manager when he received a $350 hotel bill for extra breakfast ordered by the group on their European tour. As portrayed in the movie, the group was discovered through the Coca-Cola and Tin Pan Apple hip-hop contest at Radio City Music Hall, where the trio won the grand prize—a recording contract—but had entered the contest to win the second-place prize, a stereo set. The group perform their songs "Don't You Dog Me", "All You Can Eat", "Fat Boys", and "Pump it Up."

Throughout the movie, Sheila E. and the character based on Simmons, Russell Walker (Blair Underwood), are romantically involved, which discouraged Run, who was always interested in her. In reality, Run did not like the concept of being disloyal to his brother, and the romance between him and Sheila was made up. Sheila E. made it into the film simply because they wanted a love interest, like in most films, and she recorded for Warner Bros. Records, the sister company of the film's distributor Warner Bros. Pictures. In the movie. Sheila plays herself, a drummer and percussionist, in which she performs her songs "Holly Rock" and "A Love Bizarre". In addition, the subplot involving money issues Russell faced in funding the label by borrowing from loan sharks and friends is also fictionalized.

The movie was not made the way the artists desired, but with all the talent of that time and most of the members of the Def Jam and Rush Management family. The purpose of the movie, according to Simmons, was to showcase the array of young talent emerging from New York's black music scene and depict its vibrancy.

== Production ==
Krush Groove was filmed in The Bronx, Manhattan (including at least one scene in the Marble Hill projects) and Queens in 26 days in April 1985 at a cost of $3 million. Among the locations where the movie was shot was the famous Disco Fever, a popular club during the embryonic stages of hip-hop that, by the time of the film, had fallen on some hard times. Disco Fever owner Sal Abbatiello expected the movie not only to turn the spotlight on the burgeoning hip-hop movement but also to "bring attention [back] to the club" and so agreed to have scenes shot there. Unfortunately, the attention surrounding the filming brought the scrutiny of the local authorities, who shut the club down for good on the last day of shooting for not having all the proper licenses and permits. There was also a scene shot in Shepard Hall of the historic City College of New York.

During an interview to celebrate the 25th anniversary of the film, Russell Simmons reflected on the legacy of Krush Groove and its place in hip-hop culture history. The film, Simmons said, is still recognizable not only for having brought together so many Def Jam stars at the time, but for also introducing new talent, such as LL Cool J. LL was so persistent during filming, showing up to shooting locations and performing freestyles, that producers ended up putting him in the final cut. This backdoor auditioning process became a staple of the production.

== Release ==
The film was released on October 25, 1985. Some 225 teenagers were involved at a riot at a screening of the film in Franklin Square, Nassau County. A similar incident occurred where 500 young people stormed a theater in Valley Stream, Long Island after the doors to the showing were closed, in which two people were injured. The owner of the Franklin Square theater would close the film earlier than planned as a result of the unrest.

== Reception ==
The movie received a mixed reception. The movie currently holds a 43% rating on Rotten Tomatoes based on seven reviews. Metacritic, which uses a weighted average, assigned the film a score of 37 out of 100, based on 6 critics, indicating "generally unfavorable" reviews.

== Soundtrack ==
Krush Groove

Soundtrack album by various artists
- Released: September 30, 1985
- Recorded: 1984–1985
- Genres: Hip hop; synthpop; R&B
- Length: 45:00
- Label: Warner Bros.
- Producers: Rick Rubin; Prince; Kurtis Blow; Russ Titelman; Sheila E.; Lonnie Simmons; Russell Simmons; John Benitez; Jimmy Jam & Terry Lewis

Singles from Krush Groove
- 1. "(Krush Groove) Can't Stop the Street"; 2. "Feel the Spin"; 3. "Krush Groovin'"; 4. "Holly Rock"; 5. "She's on It"; 6. "All You Can Eat"

Professional ratings
Review scores
Source	Rating
AllMusic	4.5/5 stars
The Village Voice	B+

Music from the Original Motion Picture Krush Groove (also called just Krush Groove Soundtrack) is a soundtrack album by various urban-oriented artists, which was released on Warner Bros. Records in 1985. The album peaked at number 79 on the pop chart and number 14 on the R&B chart. The Krush Groove soundtrack was released on Warner Bros. Records in 1985 and featured songs from the movie. Only 1,000 copies of the album were ever pressed on compact disc. The film was nominated for a Golden Raspberry Award for Worst Original Song for the song "All You Can Eat" at the 6th Golden Raspberry Awards.

=== Track listing ===
No.	Title	Artist	Length
1.	"(Krush Groove) Can't Stop the Street"	Chaka Khan	5:10
2.	"I Can't Live Without My Radio" (short version)	LL Cool J	4:25
3.	"If I Ruled the World"	Kurtis Blow	6:19
4.	"All You Can Eat"	Fat Boys	3:27
5.	"Feel the Spin"	Debbie Harry	4:01
6.	"Holly Rock"	Sheila E.	4:57
7.	"She's on It"	Beastie Boys	3:32
8.	"Love Triangle"	Gap Band	4:47
9.	"Tender Love"	Force MD's	3:55
10.	"Krush Groovin'"	Krush Groove All-Stars (Run-D.M.C., Sheila E., Kurtis Blow, Fat Boys)	5:05

Bonus tracks re-release 2014
No.	Title	Artist	Length
11.	"Feel the Spin" (extended remix)	Debbie Harry	6:50
12.	"(Krush Groove) Can't Stop the Street" (extended remix)	Chaka Khan	6:01

Other songs appeared in the film but were not on the album soundtrack:

- Autumn – "Kold Krush"
- Run-D.M.C. – "King of Rock", "It's Like That", "Can You Rock It Like This", "You're Blind"
- Fat Boys – "Don't You Dog Me", "Fat Boys", "Pump It Up (Let's Get Funky)"
- Sheila E. – "A Love Bizarre"
- UTFO – "Pick Up the Pace" (released as the B-side of "All You Can Eat" on Warner Bros. Records 28829)
- Nayobe – "Please Don't Go"
- New Edition – "My Secret"
- Chad Elliot – "I Want You to Be My Girl"

== Home media ==
The movie was released on VHS in 1986, then DVD in 2003. Among the special extras included on the DVD is commentary from Underwood, Michael Schultz, and The Source magazine senior editor Brett Johnson, a theatrical trailer for the movie and the Krush Groove All-Stars music video "Krush Groovin'."

== Other references ==
Krush Groove is referenced in the movie Dogma (1999) as being the subject of a bet between the two fallen angels, Bartleby (Ben Affleck) and Loki (Matt Damon), on whether it was going to be a bigger movie than E.T. the Extra-Terrestrial (1982). Krush Groove is also referenced in the 1990 film House Party. Near the end of the film, Play (Christopher Martin) mentions it was going to be on cable, and Bilal (Martin Lawrence) suggests they go to Play's house to watch it.

== See also ==
- Beat Street
- Wild Style
