= Fat Boys =

American hip hop trio

- Fat Boys in 1985 (l-r): Kool Rock-Ski, The Human Beat Box & Prince Markie Dee

Background information
- Also known as: Disco 3; Original Fat Boys
- Origin: New York City, U.S.
- Genres: Hip-hop; electro-funk
- Years active: 1983–1991; 2008–2021
- Labels: Sutra; Tin Pan Apple/Polydor/PolyGram
- Past members: Damon Wimbley, also known as "Kool Rock-Ski"; Darren Robinson, also known as "The Human Beat Box" & "Buff Love"(deceased); Mark Morales, also known as "Prince Markie Dee" (deceased)
- Website: originalfatboys.com

Fat Boys were an American hip-hop trio from Brooklyn, New York, who emerged in the early 1980s. The group was composed of Mark "Prince Markie Dee" Morales, Damon "Kool Rock-Ski" Wimbley and Darren "Buff Love" Robinson.

Robinson's ability to vocalize percussive sounds earned him the nickname "The Human Beatbox", and was a signature of the Fat Boys' music. Beloved for their comedic self-deprecating rhymes, the group released seven studio albums, four of which were certified Gold by the Recording Industry Association of America (RIAA).

Fat Boys starred in three feature films in the 1980s: Krush Groove (1985), Knights of the City (1986) and Disorderlies (1987).

== History ==
=== The Tin Pan Apple After Dark Dance & Rap Contest! ===
In a quest for talent for his newly formed record label, Tin Pan Apple, Swiss-born promoter Charles Stettler decided to hold a hip-hop talent contest. Stettler approached New York urban radio station WBLS, which recommended a couple of sponsors to him. In the end, he persuaded Coca-Cola to finance the contest. For the next three months, contests were held to identify a winner in each borough of New York City every Saturday afternoon.

On May 23, 1983, the final contest, Coca-Cola and WBLS present the Tin Pan Apple After Dark Dance & Rap Contest!, was held at Radio City Music Hall, hosted by Mr. Magic from the radio program Rap Attack. According to the terms of the competition, the winner signed a contract for a recording contract. The Fat Boys, then calling themselves the Disco 3, were unexpected winners with its song "Stick ’Em". Later in the year, the Disco 3 released their debut single "Reality", produced by James Mason, jazz guitarist and keyboardist of Roy Ayers' jazz-funk band.

=== The Disco 3 become the Fat Boys ===
Since the group did not have a manager, Stettler took over this position, and took the Disco 3 on a European bus tour. Its concerts ended at 12 o'clock in the morning, and they would not get to the hotel until two o'clock in the morning. Only places like McDonald's and Burger King were open, so the group members gained weight from this. Since so much was happening, the group members did not even notice this on the tour and did not consider themselves overweight. At one point, one of the hotels they stayed in on the tour hit Stettler with a $350 food bill that prompted the group to record a track called "Fat Boys" and change their name to Fat Boys. A party was later held for the renaming of the group to the Fat Boys at the Roseland Ballroom in New York.

=== Recording Fat Boys with Kurtis Blow ===
Stettler introduced the group to rapper and producer Kurtis Blow, who helped them find their signature sound. To work on the Fat Boys' full-length album, Kurtis Blow recruited drum machine programmers Larry Smith and Davy "DMX" Reeves, who had previously worked with Run-D.M.C. and were considered two of the best producers in hip hop at the time.

On May 29, 1984, Fat Boys released their self-titled debut album, produced by Kurtis Blow for Kama Sutra Records. The album contained "Stick 'Em" and two Billboard singles in "Jail House Rap" and "Can You Feel It?", plus "Don't You Dog Me" and "Fat Boys", which would later appear in the movie Krush Groove.

=== Fresh Fest Tour ’84 ===
One day in 1984, record executive and co-founder of hip-hop label Def Jam Recordings Russell Simmons approached Stettler about his idea for a tour in which his groups and breakdancers would take part. Since Stettler raised $300,000 from Coca-Cola to finance his 1983 contest, Simmons wanted Stettler to do it again. The young promoter could not get the beverage company to return, so he called a friend of his and asked him if there was anything the Swiss were trying to sell. The Swatch wristwatch turned out to be such a product. Stettler persuaded the company to finance $360,000 for what they would call the "Swatch Watch NYC Fresh Festival".

Simmons did not like the Fat Boys and did not want them on his tour, as they were still relatively unknown at that point. Stettler went to an old Tower Records store on 4th Street and Broadway and handed out 5,000 flyers that read: "Guess the weight of the Fat Boys and the person who does wins 800 cans of Diet Pepsi and one dollar." Thousands of children lined up at the Tower Records store to participate. Stettler put the group members on the scale; at that time they weighed 868 lb (394 kg) together. In the end, a boy from Harlem won. Channel 2 News filmed this event, including the delivery of the soft drink, but police did not respond when it was stolen a short time later.

The next day, Stettler saw in the newspaper that The Jackson 5 would be reuniting at a concert in October 1984. He called his wife and part-time partner, asking her to write a press release saying that the Jackson 5 have picked the then-still-unknown Fat Boys as their opening act. Stettler distributed this press release across the city. The next morning, Stettler and The Fat Boys appeared on the TV show Good Morning America. When the host turned around to the Fat Boys, they did not know what to say. They simply said: "Brrr, Stick' Em! Ha-ha-ha, Stick 'Em!", due to it being the group's popular song at the time. Eventually, Simmons agreed to add the Fat Boys to the lineup of the festival, which included Run-D.M.C., Kurtis Blow, Whodini, Newcleus, and The Dynamic Breakers.

The first concert of the tour took place on Labor Day, September 3, 1984. For 27 concerts in the United States, the organizers raised $3.5 million. The festival was accompanied by advertising on television.

This was followed by Fresh Fest II in 1985, which included the same acts, with Grandmaster Flash and the Furious Five replacing Newcleus. Later in the year, the Fat Boys were part of Artists United Against Apartheid's "Sun City" protest song against South Africa's minority regime's policy of apartheid. The music video shows Robinson receiving a kiss on the cheek from Bono.

=== Film & television ===
At the time, the American office of Swatch was tasked with trying to advertise their watches to American audiences. The company was known for using offbeat campaigns and agreed to feature the Fat Boys in a commercial for the watches on MTV. "Stick 'Em" was reworked into "Brrr, Swatch ’Em!" for a commercial that began airing in December 1984. Swatch again featured the Fat Boys in a 1985 Christmas advertisement created by former MTV creative heads Alan Goodman and Fred Seibert. This commercial, "Swatch Watch Presents A Merry Christmas" was first broadcast in December 1985. These commercials were notable, because when they aired in December 1984, MTV did not feature many hip-hop artists in their programming, having only started airing music videos from rap artists earlier that year with Run-D.M.C.’s crossover hit “Rock Box.” Due to the success of these commercials, they would become frequent guests on MTV, pioneering a space for hip-hop artists to appear on the network and ultimately increasing hip hop's popularity and legitimacy with MTV's audience.

Also because of these commercials, the group developed a reputation for its sense of humor. They starred in several feature films. Their first starring role came in the movie Krush Groove (1985). After which, Warner Bros. signed the Fat Boys to a three-picture deal. This deal netted only Disorderlies (1987). It featured Ralph Bellamy as a millionaire invalid cared for by his good-natured yet inept orderlies (played by the Fat Boys), whose gambling loser nephew (General Hospital's Anthony Geary) is trying to knock him off for his inheritance. Charles Stettler also makes a cameo.

=== Crushin' & Coming Back Hard Again ===
Hoping to repeat the success of Run-D.M.C. and Aerosmith's collaboration on "Walk This Way", the Fat Boys covered The Surfaris' 1963 hit "Wipeout" with The Beach Boys. The single peaked at number 12 on the Billboard Hot 100 and number 10 on the Hot R&B/Hip-Hop Songs, helping their fourth studio album Crushin' (1987) become the Fat Boys' first Platinum record. In the UK, "Wipeout" reached number 2 on Top 100 in September 1987 during a 13-week chart run. "Wipeout" was the last song recorded for Crushin'.

The music video for the song begins with Ray Mancini and Héctor Camacho as guest on a boxing program with the Fat Boys and Beach Boys standing behind them, respectively. The program turns into a fight after the retired Mancini states that his only major career regret is not fighting Héctor Camacho. In the following scene, the Fat Boys load up a car with surfboards and floaties for a trip to the beach. The Beach Boys are driving in a dune buggy through the city. Both bands go around the city in the direction of the beach, while they perform the song and invite the inhabitants of the city to come to the beach. Meanwhile, at the beach Wimbley tries to lift a heavy weight and is laughed at by two women because of failure, Morales playing volleyball and Robinson surfing. The Beach Boys on the other hand are DJing in the street. At the end of the video, they all celebrate at a beach party.

Fat Boys were later approached to record the theme song for A Nightmare on Elm Street 4: The Dream Master (1988), called "Are You Ready for Freddy", which featured Robert Englund performing as Freddy Krueger. "Are You Ready for Freddy" was also included on their follow up album, Coming Back Hard Again (1988). Coming Back Hard Again repeated the formula of Cruisin' and went Gold on the heels of a revamping of "The Twist (Yo, Twist)" with its original artist, Chubby Checker. The single peaked at number 16 on the Billboard Hot 100 and number 40 on the Hot R&B/Hip-Hop Songs. "The Twist (Yo, Twist)" reached number two on the UK Top 100 in July 1988 during a 11-week chart run. Another song from the album, "Louie Louie", is a cover version of a 1957 song by American singer Richard Berry. The song peaked at number 46 on UK Top 100 on November 5, 1988, for 4 weeks.

=== Breakup ===
However, the tastes of the listeners at that time had already changed. By taking part in the hip-hop opera On and On, the group tried to regain its fame, but this only accelerated the breakup of the group. Prince Markie Dee got fired from the group in 1990 to pursue solo interests., which included producing many early tracks for Mariah Carey and Mary J. Blige which included her debut single, "Real Love". In 1991, the remaining two members, Kool Rock-Ski and Buff Love, carried on as a duo trying to sign with Polygram Records but the label did not sign them. They signed with Atlanta, Georgia label Ichiban Records and they released Mack Daddy (1991) with the single "Whip It On Me". The album did not make much success, and shortly thereafter, the group disbanded (until 2008). In the 1992 feature film Boomerang, Chris Rock's character laments the breakup of the Fat Boys. He was later quoted by Jay-Z in his 2001 song the "Heart of the City (Ain't No Love)".

== Aftermath ==
On December 10, 1995, Robinson died of a heart attack during a bout with respiratory flu in Rosedale, Queens, New York. He was 28 years old and reportedly weighed 450 pounds (200 kg).

The surviving members of the Fat Boys launched its first official homepage, OriginalFatBoys.com, on November 5, 2008. According to the website, the Fat Boys recorded their first track in nearly two decades and had plans of doing a reality TV show in search of a new member.

In March 2009, Kool Rock-Ski announced the launch of his official website, KoolRockSki.com (which is no longer up). His first solo project, the EP Party Time, was released on April 14, 2009.

On October 18, 2010, the cable network TV One aired Unsung: The Story of The Fat Boys. It mentioned that the two surviving members reunited and were touring with Doug E. Fresh who was providing the beatboxing. There was no confirmation at the time as to whether he was the new third permanent member. The special was produced by the group's manager, Louis Gregory, publicly known as Uncle Louie.

In August 2012, The Fat Boys were scheduled to perform at the 13th annual Gathering of the Juggalos in Cave-In-Rock, Illinois, but ultimately failed to appear.

Prince Markie Dee died of a suspected heart attack on February 18, 2021, the day before his 53rd birthday; according to TMZ, Morales had gone to the hospital complaining of chest pains. It was determined a stent was needed to clear blockage in his heart, but Morales died before the stent could be inserted.

Prince Markie Dee was a radio host who worked at WMIB-FM and WEDR-FM in Miami, Florida, as well as SiriusXM. The last surviving Fat Boy, Kool Rock-Ski, is last known to have been residing in New York.

== Discography ==
=== Albums ===
List of albums, with selected chart positions
Title	Album details	Peak chart positions									Certifications
Title	Album details	US	US R&B /HH	AUT	CAN	GER	NL	NZ	SWI	UK	Certifications
Fat Boys	Released: May 29, 1984; Label: Sutra; Format: CD, LP, cassette, digital download, streaming	48	6	—	—	—	—	—	—	—	RIAA: Gold
The Fat Boys Are Back	Released: June 1, 1985; Label: Sutra; Format: CD, LP, cassette, digital download, streaming	63	11	—	—	—	—	—	—	—	RIAA: Gold
Big & Beautiful	Released: May 2, 1986; Label: Sutra; Format: CD, LP, cassette, digital download, streaming	62	10	—	—	—	—	—	—	—	
Crushin'	Released: August 14, 1987; Label: Tin Pan Apple/Polydor/PolyGram; Format: CD, LP, cassette, digital download, streaming	8	4	—	56	—	—	40	—	49	RIAA: Platinum
Coming Back Hard Again	Released: July 1, 1988; Label: Tin Pan Apple/Polydor/PolyGram; Format: CD, LP, cassette, digital download, streaming	33	30	22	73	11	46	—	18	98	RIAA: Gold
On and On	Released: October, 1989; Label: Tin Pan Apple/Mercury/PolyGram; Format: CD, LP, cassette, digital download, streaming	175	52	—	—	—	—	—	—	—	
Mack Daddy	Released: October 28, 1991; Label: Emperor/Ichiban; Format: CD, cassette, digital download, streaming	—	89	—	—	—	—	—	—	—	
"—" denotes releases that did not chart or were not released in that territory.

=== Singles ===
Year	Single	Peak chart positions													Album
Year	Single	US	US R&B/Hip-Hop	US Dance	AUS	AUT	BE	CAN	GER	IRE	NL	NZ	SWI	UK	Album
1983	"Reality" (as Disco 3)	—	92	—	—	—	—	—	—	—	—	—	—	—	Non-album single
1984	"Fat Boys"/"Human Beat Box" (as Disco 3)	—	65	—	—	—	—	—	—	—	—	—	—	—	Fat Boys
1984	"Jail House Rap"	105	17	—	—	—	—	—	—	—	—	—	—	63	Fat Boys
1985	"Can You Feel It"	101	38	—	—	—	—	—	—	—	—	—	—	—	Fat Boys
1985	"The Fat Boys Are Back"	—	27	—	—	—	—	—	—	—	—	—	—	—	The Fat Boys Are Back
1985	"Hard Core Reggae"	—	52	—	—	—	—	—	—	—	—	—	—	—	The Fat Boys Are Back
1985	"Don't Be Stupid"	—	62	—	—	—	—	—	—	—	—	—	—	—	The Fat Boys Are Back
1986	"Sex Machine"	—	23	—	—	—	—	—	—	—	—	47	—	—	Big & Beautiful
1986	"In the House"	—	51	—	—	—	—	—	—	—	—	—	—	—	Big & Beautiful
1987	"Falling in Love"	—	16	—	—	—	—	—	—	—	—	—	—	—	Crushin'
1987	"Wipeout" (with the Beach Boys)	12	10	42	65	—	17	12	30	3	13	2	—	2	Crushin'
1988	"The Twist" (with Chubby Checker)	16	40	—	21	5	2	37	1	4	4	7	1	2	Coming Back Hard Again
1988	"Are You Ready for Freddy"	—	93	—	—	—	—	—	—	—	—	—	—	83	Coming Back Hard Again
1988	"Louie, Louie"	89	—	—	—	—	—	—	45	—	—	—	—	46	Coming Back Hard Again
1989	"Lie-Z"	—	81	—	—	—	—	—	—	—	—	—	—	—	On and On
1989	"Just Loungin'"	—	86	—	—	—	—	—	—	—	—	—	—	—	On and On
"—" denotes releases that did not chart or were not released in that territory.

Soundtracks
Year	Title	Song	Release date
1985	Krush Groove	"Don't You Dog Me", "Pump It Up - Let's Get Funky", "All You Can Eat", "Fat Boys", "Krush Groovin'"	October 25, 1985
1986	Knights of the City	"Jailhouse Rap"	February 14, 1986
1987	Disorderlies	"Rock Rulin'", "Baby You're a Rich Man", "Wipe Out"	August 14, 1987
1988	Police Academy (TV series)	"They Wear The Blue" (the opening theme song)	September 10, 1988
1988	The Freddy Krueger Special (TV Movie)	"Are You Ready For Freddy?"	August 18, 1988
1988	A Nightmare on Elm Street 4: The Dream Master	"Are You Ready For Freddy?"	August 19, 1988
1989	She-Devil	"It's Getting Hot", "Party Up"	December 8, 1989
2000	Price of Glory	"Roving Gangster (Rollin')"	March 31, 2000
2006	Scarface: The World Is Yours (video game)	"Hardcore Reggae", "Human Beat Box"	October 10, 2006
2009	Everybody Hates Chris (TV Series), episode "Everybody Hates Fake IDs"	"All You Can Eat"	January 23, 2009
2012	Rude Tube (TV Series), episode "Utter Fails"	"The Fat Boys Are Back"	September 10, 2012
2014	Ping Pong Summer	"Stick 'Em"	June 6, 2014
2014	Rap Critic Reviews (TV Series), episode "Top 5 Worst Lyrics I've Ever Heard... This Month"	"Wipeout", "Protect Yourself/My Nuts"	February 27, 2014
2017	One Hit Wonderland (TV Series documentary), episode "Rock Me Amadeus" by Falco	"Human Beat Box"	March 1, 2017

== Filmography ==
=== Feature films ===
- 1985 – Krush Groove (October 25, 1985)
- 1986 – Knights of the City (February 14, 1986)
- 1987 – Disorderlies (August 14, 1987)

=== Documentary ===
- 2000 – Where Are They Now?: The 80s II (by VH-1) (September 28, 2000)
- 2002 – Breath Control: The History of the Human Beat Box (Tribeca Film Festival 2002) (May 9, 2002)
- 2004 – And You Don't Stop: 30 Years of Hip-Hop (October 4, 2004)
- 2010 – Unsung: The Story of The Fat Boys (by TV One) (October 18, 2010)
- 2010 – Never Sleep Again: The Elm Street Legacy (DVD) (May 4, 2010)
- 2011 – Beatboxing - The Fifth Element of Hip Hop (Atlanta Film Festival, May 5, 2011)

=== Video compilations ===
- 1986 - Brrr, Watch 'Em! (MCA Home Video)
- 1988 - 3×3 (PolyGram Music Video)

Television
Year	Title	Release date
1984	TV commercial for Swatch wrist watches ("Brrr, Swatch 'Em!")	December 1984
1985	TV commercial for Swatch wrist watches ("Swatch Watch Presents A Merry Christmas")	December 1985
1985	Soul Train (TV Series) - episode "The Temptations/The Fat Boys"	January 5, 1985
1986	Miami Vice (телешоу), episode "Florence Italy"	February 14, 1986
1987	Ebony/Jet Showcase (TV Series)	September 11, 1987
1987	The New Hollywood Squares (TV Series)	November 16, 1987
1987	Square One (TV Series), episode 1.12, music video "Burger Pattern"	February 10, 1987
1988	Square One (TV Series), episode 2.1, music video "One Billion"	September 19, 1988
1988	T. and T. (TV Series), episode "The Silver Angel"	February 22, 1988
1988	Nelson Mandela 70th Birthday Tribute (TV Special documentary)	June 11, 1988
1988	MTV Video Music Awards (TV Series)	September 7, 1988
1988	Sacrée soirée (TV Series)	October 19, 1988
1988	Rockopop	November 5, 1988
1989	Police Academy (TV series) season 2, episode 29, "Survival of the Fattest" (voice)	January 14, 1989
1989	Square One (TV Series), episode 3.41, music video "Working Backwards"	December 23, 1990
1990	Ebony/Jet Showcase (TV Series)	March 16, 1990
2017	Detroiters (TV series) Season 1 Episode 9 "Husky Boys"	April 4, 2017

Videos
Year	Title
1984	"Fat Boys"
1984	"Jail House Rap"
1984	"Can You Feel It?"
1985	"Stick 'Em"
1985	"Hard Core Reggae"
1985	"Don't You Dog Me"
1985	"All You Can Eat"
1986	"Sex Machine"
1986	"King Holiday" (King Dream Chorus and Holiday Crew)
1987	"Wipeout" (Fat Boys and The Beach Boys)
1988	"The Twist (Yo, Twist)" (Fat Boys & Chubby Checker)
1988	"Louie, Louie"
1988	"Are You Ready For Freddy?"
1989	"Lie-Z"
