= Darren Robinson (rapper) =

American rapper and beatboxer (1967–1995)

- Robinson on Venice Beach circa 1985

Background information
- Born: June 10, 1967; Manning, South Carolina, U.S.
- Died: December 10, 1995 (aged 28) New York City U.S.
- Genre: Hip hop
- Years active: 1984–1995

Darren Robinson (June 10, 1967 – December 10, 1995), also known as Big Buff, Buff Love, Buffy, The Human Beat Box, The Ox That Rocks, and DJ Doctor Nice (among other aliases), was a rapper, beatboxer, and actor who was a member of the 1980s hip hop group The Fat Boys. He, along with Doug E. Fresh and others, were pioneers of beatboxing, a form of vocal percussion used in many rap groups throughout the 1980s and 1990s.

== Career ==
Robinson and the Fat Boys were featured in the 1985 movie Krush Groove. The film, loosely based on the early days of the Def Jam record label, also featured Blair Underwood as Russell Simmons (named Russell Walker in the movie), and record producer Rick Rubin, along with Run DMC, Sheila E., Beastie Boys, Kurtis Blow, and a young LL Cool J.

In December 1990, as the group's fame was declining, Robinson was charged with filming a 14-year-old girl being sexually abused during a party, four months prior, in suburban Philadelphia. Robinson pleaded guilty to sexual abuse of children, and was sentenced to two years' probation and fined $10,000.

== Death ==
Although fitting for the group's image, Robinson's weight contributed to his death. He had been diagnosed with lymphedema, or fluid buildup, and died of a heart attack on December 10, 1995, weighing 450 pounds (200 kg). He had also been battling the flu, according to his older brother, Curtis, who was also his manager. "He was doing one of his songs, and at the end, he got off the couch and was climbing on a studio chair when he fell," Robinson said. "I tried to give him mouth to mouth, but he just couldn't make it." Paramedics were called to Robinson's home in Rosedale, New York, at 3 a.m., but were also unable to revive the rapper.

Curtis said Darren had been trying to lose weight and was working on a Fat Boys reunion album.
