= Tommy Boy Records discography =

Song Albums

The following is a list of albums released by record label Tommy Boy Records.

== 1980s ==
=== 1983 ===
- Jonzun Crew - Lost in Space
- Planet Patrol - Planet Patrol

=== 1984 ===
- Force MDs - Love Letters
- Jonzun Crew - Down to Earth

=== 1985 ===
- Various artists - Masters of the Beat
- Various artists - Power Jam '85
- Various artists - Tommy Boy: Greatest Beats

=== 1986 ===
- Afrika Bambaataa - Beware (The Funk Is Everywhere)
- Afrika Bambaataa & Soulsonic Force - Planet Rock: The Album
- Force MDs - Chillin'
- Stetsasonic - On Fire

=== 1987 ===
- Force MDs - Touch and Go
- TKA - Scars of Love

=== 1988 ===
- Information Society - Information Society
- Stetsasonic - In Full Gear

=== 1989 ===
- Coldcut - What's That Noise? (Reprise)
- De La Soul - 3 Feet High and Rising
- Timmy Gatling - Help
- Queen Latifah - All Hail the Queen

== 1990s ==
=== 1990 ===
- Digital Underground - Sex Packets
- Force MDs - Step to Me
- Information Society - Hack
- Paris - The Devil Made Me Do It (Scarface)
- TKA - Louder Than Love

=== 1991 ===
- De La Soul - De La Soul Is Dead
- Digital Underground - Sons of the P
- J.C. Lodge - Tropic of Love
- Naughty by Nature - Naughty by Nature
- Queen Latifah - Nature of a Sista'
- Stetsasonic - Blood, Sweat & No Tears
- Various artists - MTV Party to Go 1

=== 1992 ===
- De La Soul - De La Remix
- Force MDs - For Lovers and Others: Force M.D.'s Greatest Hits
- House of Pain - House of Pain
- Information Society - Peace and Love, Inc.
- TKA - Greatest Hits
- Various artists - MTV Party to Go 2

=== 1993 ===
- De La Soul - Buhloone Mindstate
- Digital Underground - The Body-Hat Syndrome
- K7 - Swing Batta Swing
- RuPaul - Supermodel of the World
- Naughty by Nature - 19 Naughty III
- Various artists - MTV Party to Go 3
- Various artists - MTV Party to Go 4

=== 1994 ===
- Coolio - It Takes a Thief
- House of Pain - Same as It Ever Was
- Various artists - Big Blunts
- Various artists - Jock Rock, Volume 1
- Various artists - MTV Party to Go 5
- Various artists - MTV Party to Go 6

=== 1995 ===
- Coolio - Gangsta's Paradise
- Naughty by Nature - Poverty's Paradise
- Various artists - Jock Jams, Volume 1
- Various artists - Jock Rock, Volume 2
- Various artists - MTV Party to Go 7
- Various artists - MTV Party to Go 8
- Various artists - New Jersey Drive, Vol. 1
- Various artists - New Jersey Drive, Vol. 2

=== 1996 ===
- Above the Law - Time Will Reveal
- Amber - This Is Your Night
- Big Noyd - Episodes of a Hustla
- De La Soul - Stakes Is High
- House of Pain - Truth Crushed to Earth Shall Rise Again
- L.V. - I Am L.V.
- Meat Loaf - Live Around the World
- Various artists - Jock Jams, Volume 2
- Various artists - MTV Party to Go 9
- Various artists - MTV Party to Go 10

=== 1997 ===
- Capone-N-Noreaga - The War Report
- Coolio - My Soul
- Jocelyn Enriquez - Jocelyn
- Oran "Juice" Jones - Player's Call
- Various artists - Jock Jams, Volume 3
- Various artists - MTV Grind 1
- Various artists - MTV Party to Go 1998
- Various artists - MTV Party to Go Platinum Mix
- Various artists - Nothing to Lose: Music from and Inspired by the Motion Picture

=== 1998 ===
- Above the Law - Legends
- Defari— Focused Daily
- Everlast - Whitey Ford Sings the Blues
- Joydrop - Metasexual
- Various artists - 54 (Music From The Miramax Motion Picture)
- Various artists - Jock Jams, Volume 4
- Various artists - MTV Party to Go 1999
- Various artists - Ride (Music from the Dimension Motion Picture)

=== 1999 ===
- Amber - Amber
- Badmarsh & Shri - Dancing Drums
- Handsome Boy Modeling School - So... How's Your Girl?
- Naughty by Nature - Nature's Finest
- Prince Paul - A Prince Among Thieves
- Section 8 Mob - Guilty by Association (Dark City)
- Shoestring - Representin' till the World Ends
- Various artists - Get Crunk (Da Album)
- Various artists - Jock Jams, Volume 5
- Various artists - Jock Rock 2000
- Various artists - MTV Party to Go 2000
- Various artists - WCW Mayhem: The Music

== 2000s ==
=== 2000 ===
- Amber - Remixed
- Capone-N-Noreaga - The Reunion
- Sara von Davenport - Anointed Praise
- De La Soul - Art Official Intelligence: Mosaic Thump
- Diggin' in the Crates Crew - D.I.T.C.
- Everlast - Eat at Whitey's
- Shelly Gaines - The Gift
- Pimpadelic - Southern Devils
- Screwball - Y2K: The Album
- Tony Touch - The Piece Maker

=== 2001 ===
- Afrika Bambaataa - Looking for the Perfect Beat: 1980–1985
- Coo Coo Cal - Disturbed
- Coolio - Fantastic Voyage: The Greatest Hits
- De La Soul - AOI: Bionix
- Digital Underground - No Nose Job: The Legend of Digital Underground
- Information Society - strange haircuts // cardboard guitars // and computer samples
- Joydrop - Viberate
- Masters at Work - Our Time is Coming
- Rustic Overtones - ¡Viva Nueva!
- Various artists - Jock Jams: The All-Star Jock Jams
- Various artists - MTV Party to Go Remixed

=== 2002 ===
- Amber - Naked
- Force MDs - Let Me Love You: The Greatest Hits
- Sneaker Pimps - Bloodsport

=== 2003 ===
- Biz Markie - Weekend Warrior
- De La Soul - The Best of De La Soul
- Digital Underground - Playwutchyalike: The Best of Digital Underground
- FannyPack - So Stylistic
- Murk - Murk
- Naughty by Nature - Naughty's Nicest
- The Roc Project featuring Tina Novak - Never

=== 2004 ===
- Afrika Bambaataa - Dark Matter Moving at the Speed of Light

=== 2005 ===
- FannyPack - See You Next Tuesday
- Gucci Mane - Trap House
- Tom & Joy - Antigua
- Canibus - Mind Control (Canibus album)

=== 2006 ===
- Daniel Cirera - Honestly; I Love You *Cough*
- Gucci Mane - Hard to Kill
- Bob Sinclar - Western Dream (Defected/Ministry of Sound Australia)

=== 2007 ===
- 2XL - Neighborhood Rapstar
- The Cliks - Snakehouse
- Ultra Naté - Grime, Silk, & Thunder

=== 2008 ===
- FannyPack - Ghetto Bootleg

=== 2009 ===
- Andy Caldwell - Obsession
- The Cliks - Dirty King
- Blake Lewis - Heartbreak on Vinyl
- Plushgun - Pins & Panzers

== 2010s ==
=== 2014 ===
- Ghostface Killah - 36 Seasons

=== 2015 ===
- Method Man - The Meth Lab
- Sheek Louch - Silverback Gorilla 2

=== 2016 ===
- Brookzill! - Throwback to the Future
- Sadat X - Agua
