= Jocelyn Enriquez discography =

- Studio albums: 3
- Singles: 15

This article presents the discography of Jocelyn Enriquez.

== Studio albums ==
Title	Album details	Chart positions	
Title	Album details	US	US Heat.
Lovely	Released: July 5, 1994; Label: Classified; Formats: Cassette, CD	—	—
Jocelyn	Released: May 13, 1997; Label: Tommy Boy; Formats: Cassette, CD	182	11
All My Life	Released: February 11, 2003; Label: Jem Entertainment; Format: CD	—	—

== Singles ==
Year	Title	Chart positions					Album
Year	Title	US	US Dance	US Dance Sales	US Rhythmic	CAN	Album
1994	"I've Been Thinking About You"	80	—	41	19	—	Lovely
1994	"Make This Last Forever"	101	—	39	32	—	Lovely
1995	"You Are the One"	—	—	—	—	—	Lovely
1995	"Big Love"	—	—	—	—	—	Lovely
1995	"Only"	—	—	—	—	—	Lovely
1995	"All Right Y'all" ^{1}	—	—	—	—	—	Non-album single
1996	"Do You Miss Me?"	49	—	8	17	12	Jocelyn
1997	"A Little Bit of Ecstasy"	55	15	1	25	—	Jocelyn
1998	"Get Into the Rhythm"	—	9	17	—	—	Jocelyn
1998	"If You Could Read My Mind" ^{2}	52	3	3	—	7	54: Music from the Miramax Motion Picture, Volume 2 soundtrack
2000	"When I Get Close to You"	—	1	10	—	—	Non-album singles
2001	"So Fabulous So Fierce" ^{3}	—	—	—	—	—	Non-album singles
2003	"No Way No How"	—	17	—	—	—	All My Life
2004	"Why"	—	—	—	—	—	All My Life
2018	"To Love Again"	—	—	—	—	—	Non-album single

Notes

- ^{1} BB Swing featuring Jocelyn Enriquez.
- ^{2} As part of the trio Stars on 54.
- ^{3} Thunderpuss featuring Jocelyn Enriquez.
