= Throwing the Game (album) =

Studio album by Lucky Boys Confusion
- Released: May 8, 2001
- Genres: Punk rock, pop punk, ska punk, rap rock
- Length: 52:28
- Label: Elektra
- Producer: Howard Benson

Lucky Boys Confusion chronology
The Soapbox Spectacle (2000)	Throwing the Game (2001)	Commitment (2003)

Professional ratings
Review scores
Source	Rating
Allmusic	link

Throwing the Game is the second full-length studio album by American rock band Lucky Boys Confusion, released on May 8, 2001 by Elektra Records, making it their major label debut. The album contains newly recorded versions of songs from Growing Out of It and The Soapbox Spectacle, plus five new songs.

== Track listing ==
1. "Breaking Rules" – 3:26
2. "40/80" – 4:18
3. "Fred Astaire" – 3:58
4. "Bossman (ft. Beenie Man)" – 3:20
5. "Do You Miss Me [Killians]" – 2:50
6. "Child's Play" – 3:43
7. "Dumb Pop Song / Left of Center" – 3:27
8. "Not About Debra" – 3:55
9. "Saturday Night" – 3:58
10. "Never like This" – 1:09
11. "3 to 10 / CB's Caddy Part III" – 3:28
12. "City Lights" – 3:40
13. "One to the Right" – 3:25
14. "Slip" + "Perfect (Hidden Track)" – 7:55

== Personnel ==
- Kaustubh Pandav – vocals
- Adam Krier – guitars, vocals, Hammond B3 organ, piano
- Ryan Fergus – drums
- Joe Sell – guitars
- Jason Schultejann – bass guitar

== Notes ==
- "Do You Miss Me" is a cover of Jocelyn Enriquez's hit single, though with altered lyrics in the verses.
- "Perfect", the album's hidden bonus track, begins at approximately 3:47 on Track 14.
