= Matt Goias =

American music producer (born 1977)

Matt Goias (born October 12, 1977) is a New York City-based entrepreneur, music producer and writer.

== Early years ==
Matt Goias was born in Edison, New Jersey and spent his childhood and teenage years living in New Jersey and New York. He began collecting records and djing at the age of 11, and spun in a Manhattan nightclub for the first time at age 14.

As a teenager he went on to co-found the weekly hip-hop party Indie 5000 (along with DJ Max Glazer, artist Stephen “ESPO” Powers, and Ari Forman of On The Go Magazine). With Goias at the helm, Indie 5000 hosted weekly, celebrity, guest DJs including Cipha Sounds, Peanut Butter Wolf, PF Cuttin, Lord Finesse, DJ Premier, Kid Capri, DJ Soul, Lord Sear, and Prince Paul. At 22 years old, Goias was profiled by Vogue Magazine and named the “Jack of Clubs” for his work on the cultural scene.

== Marketing career ==
Goias is currently a partner of The Class Trip Corporation, a marketing entity based in New York City.

== Musical production ==
In 2003, Goias help found the hit musical group FannyPack. The band's hit single Cameltoe described the female apparel phenomenon and was number one on Carson Daly's Total Request Live radio show for five consecutive weeks. Signed to Tommy Boy Records, the group released two critically praised albums. The first was 2003's So Stylistic, which was followed in 2005 by See You Next Tuesday. By 2005, the band had performed in 15 countries and received hundreds of articles in publications around the globe.

Goias reunited with DJ Fancy as well as DJ Max Glazer to form 'Business Class', a music development entity.

== Other concepts ==
Recently, Goias and artist Steve Powers collaborated on an art show in Paris’ Colette boutique entitle L’Attraction de la Boue to commemorate World Aids Day 2009.

=== The Bench ===
Goias, along with Max Glazer, Ari Saal Forman, and Fancy, garnered media attention with the creation of "The Bench" on the corner of Houston and Orchard Streets in New York City. The conceptual piece was an exercise in "creating something out of nothing meant to raise questions about what exactly it is that makes an event or place "cool" or "relevant." The goal was to prove that with the right combination of attendees, artwork, location, and viral propaganda, the artists involved would be able to make nothing at all, four friends sitting on a bench, the "coolest" party in New York City. The “event” was covered extensively by Gawker, Time Out New York, Gothamist, AdBusters, and The New York Observer. Goias and The Bench were featured on the cover of the Arts and Culture section of The New York Observer on August 7, 2007.

== Published work ==
As a writer, Goias has written a monthly column called "Sexytime Explosion" in Mass Appeal Magazine and one called "The Gospel According to Matthew" in Missbehave Magazine. He has also contributed to Complex Magazine and YRB.
