= Betsey Johnson =

American fashion designer

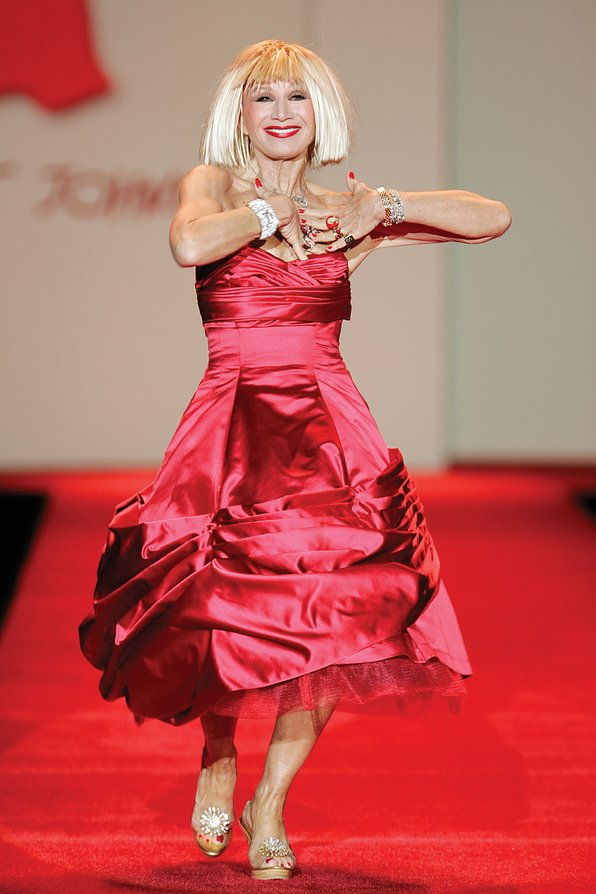
- Johnson at the 2007 Red Dress Collection show for The Heart Truth campaign
- Born: August 10, 1942 (age 84); Wethersfield, Connecticut, U.S.
- Occupation: Fashion designer
- Spouse(s): John Cale (1968–1971); Jeffrey Oliviere (1981–1984); Brian Reynolds (1997–2002)
- Children: 1
- Awards: 2015 CFDA Geoffrey Beene Lifetime Achievement Award
- Website: BetseyJohnson.com

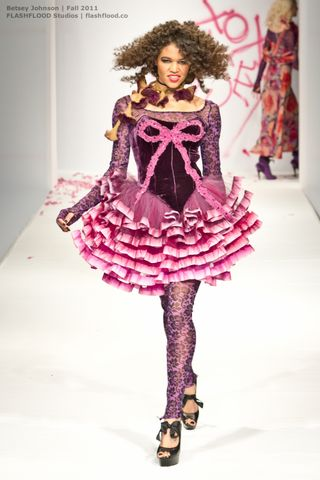
Betsey Johnson dress, 2011

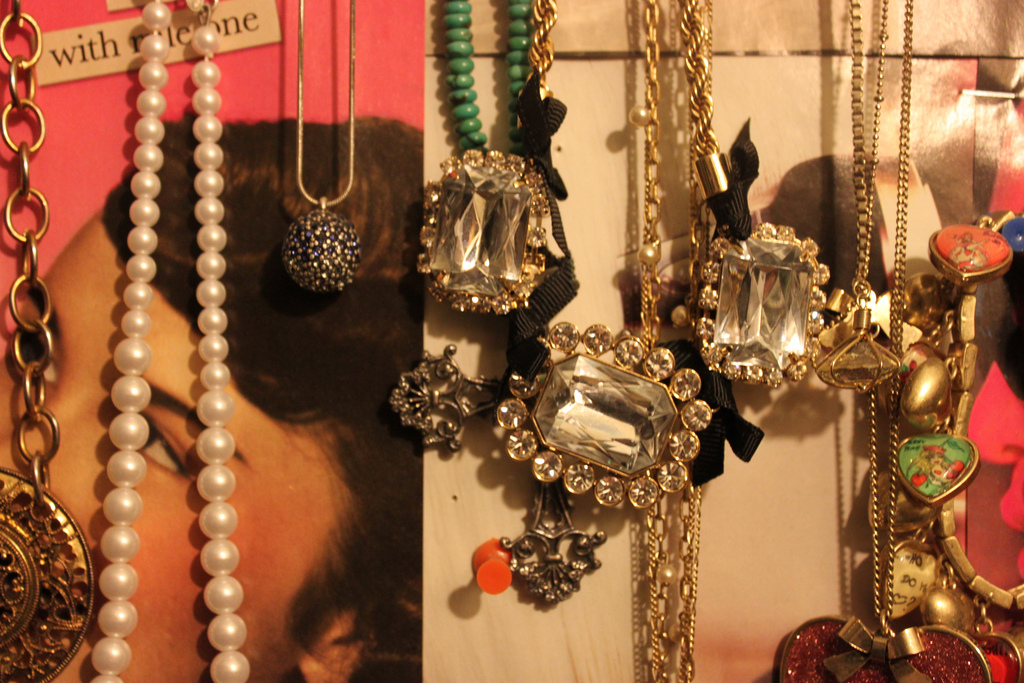
Betsey Johnson jewelry, 2011

Betsey Johnson (born August 10, 1942) is an American fashion designer best known for her colorful, cute, and whimsical designs. Many of her designs are considered "over the top" and embellished. She is also known for doing a cartwheel ending in a split at the end of her fashion shows. She is a recipient of the 2015 CFDA Geoffrey Beene Lifetime Achievement Award.

Johnson is also an artist.

== Early life and education ==
Johnson was born in Wethersfield, Connecticut, the second of three children born to Lena and John Johnson. She has an elder sister, Sally, and a younger brother, Robert. Johnson grew up in Terryville, Connecticut, and took many dance classes, which inspired her love of costumes.

Following her graduation from high school, Johnson studied at the Pratt Institute and then later graduated Phi Beta Kappa from Syracuse University, where she was a member of the Alpha Xi Delta women's sorority. After graduation, she spent a summer as an intern at Mademoiselle magazine, where she was mentored by Edie Locke.

== Career ==
Johnson's fashion career started after she entered and won the Mademoiselle Guest Editor Contest in 1964. Johnson soon became part of the youthquake fashion movement when she became the in-house designer for Manhattan boutique Paraphernalia in 1965, her clothes worn by celebrities like Linda Ronstadt and Anouk Aimée.

In 1967, she designed the costumes for Edie Sedgwick and Jane Holzer in the underground film Ciao! Manhattan.

In 1969, she and fellow Paraphernalia alums Bunky Washburn and Nini Latorre opened a boutique called Betsey, Bunky, and Nini on New York City's Upper East Side. The shop featured Johnson's clothing and accessory designs and introduced a line of Betsey Johnson shoes that included an early example of high-heeled sneakers, an idea that would be taken up by various other designers in later years, including Norma Kamali in the 1980s. The shop also stocked work by other forward-thinking designers, most famously Ossie Clark. Edie Sedgwick was her house model and Johnson designed the clothing Sedgwick wore on her last film, Ciao! Manhattan.

In the 1970s, Johnson took control of the fashion label "Alley Cat" which was popular with the rock 'n roll musicians of the day. In her first year, her debut collection for Alley Cat reportedly sold $5 million in volume. In September 1971 she received the Coty Fashion Critics' Award (a 'Winnie').

In 1978, Johnson started her own fashion line. Her second collection did not sell well, leaving her with 3,000 pieces of spring clothing and insufficient funds to stage a 1981 fashion show to sell them; Johnson opened a retail store in the SoHo area of New York City. She designed the dress that Lisa Loeb wore in the music video for her 1994 hit "Stay (I Missed You)".

In 2002, Johnson was inducted into the Fashion Walk of Fame. Her bronze plaque held one of her original sketches. In 2003, she expanded her line for 2004 to include handbags, accessories, hats, and scarves.

In 2008, Johnson was a contributor to Carrie Borzillo-Vrenna's book Cherry Bomb.

The National Arts Club awarded Johnson the 2009 Medal of Honor for Lifetime Achievement in Fashion. She once described her style as a formula: "Take a leotard and add a skirt." As of 2011, she has more than 65 stores worldwide.

In September 2010, her Spring/Summer 2011 Ready-to-Wear fashion show generated a lot of buzz before it started because models were rumored to come down the runway riding bicycles. However, the original concept proved too dangerous during the rehearsals, so Betsey asked model Kim Matulova to ride a skateboard while wearing open-toed platform heels instead. She ended up falling to the ground and losing one of her shoes, and she had to get off and shoulder her skateboard all the way back up the catwalk.

On April 26, 2012, Betsey Johnson, LLC filed voluntarily for Chapter 11 bankruptcy protection.

On September 12, 2012, she celebrated 40 years of her brand with a retrospective fashion show with Cyndi Lauper performing.

Johnson and her daughter Lulu Johnson had a reality TV show XOX Betsey Johnson that aired on the Style Network from May to July 2013.

On September 4, 2014, it was announced that Johnson would be one of the celebrities competing on the 19th season of Dancing with the Stars. The couple was eliminated in week 4, finishing in tenth place.

In 2015, Johnson was honored with the Geoffrey Beene Lifetime Achievement Award at the CFDA Fashion Awards.

In 2018, Johnson appeared on Sugar Rush as a guest judge (Episode: "Frosted Fashion").

In 2022, Johnson appeared on RuPaul's Drag Race All Stars as a guest judge. (Episode: "Legendary Legend Looks"). She appeared on the show again in 2025 on (Episode: "Heavens To Betsey!") as a guest judge where the challenge for the contestants was to make looks inspired by Johnson.

== Personal life ==
Johnson was married to the Velvet Underground musician John Cale from 1968 to 1971. They met while she was making costumes for the film Ciao! Manhattan in 1967.

Johnson was later married to Jeffrey Oliviere and Brian Reynolds.

Johnson has one child, Lulu Johnson, who is an American fashion designer and model.

Johnson is a long-term breast cancer survivor. It has been reported that she lives in the Paradise Cove area of Malibu, California.
