= The Super Happy Fun Club =

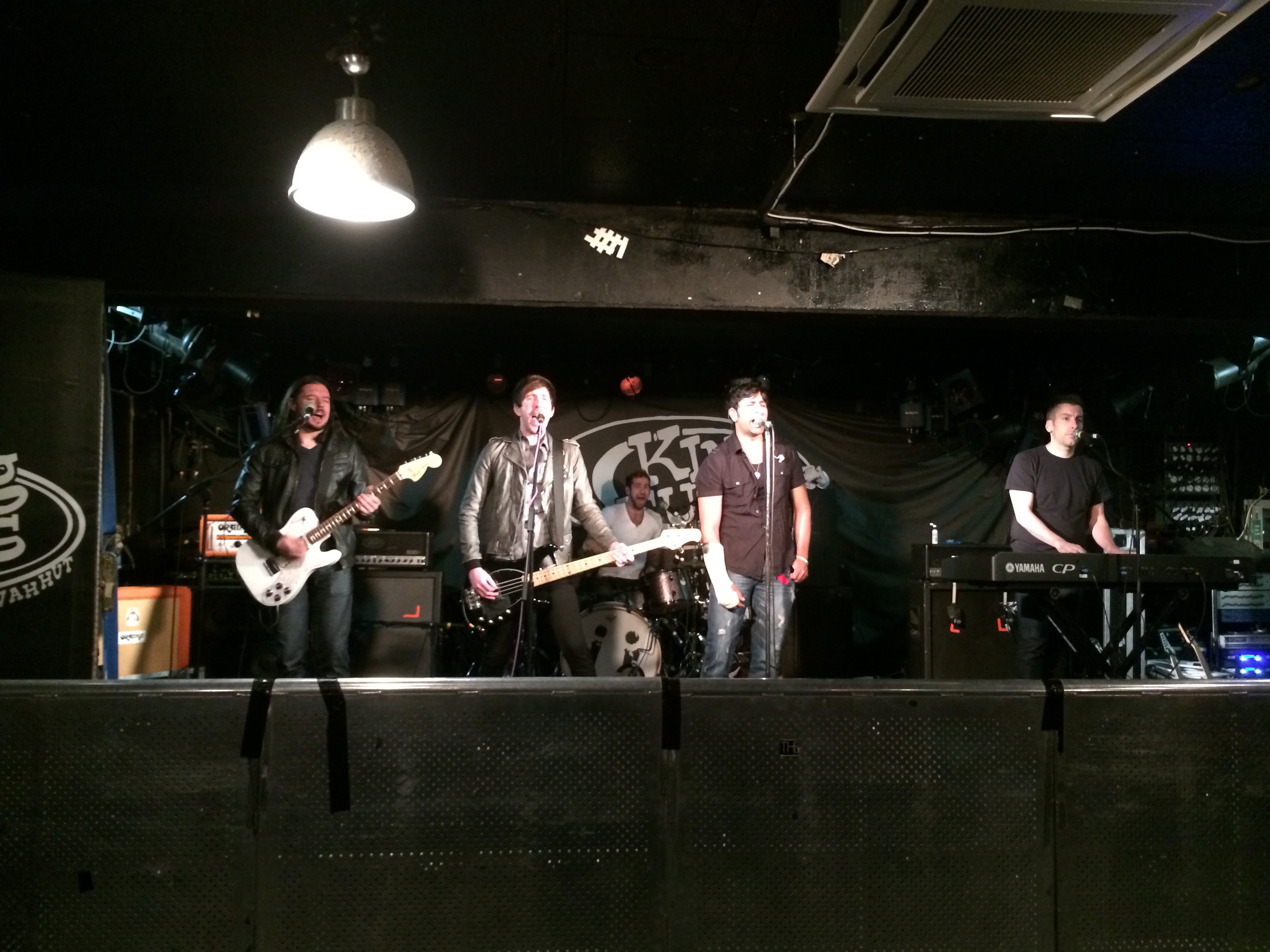
- Super Happy Fun Club soundchecking at King Tut's Wah Wah Hut during the Madina Lake Farewell Celebration and Final UK Tour, 10-10-2013

Background information
- Origin: Chicago, Illinois, United States
- Genres: Piano rock, alternative rock, power pop, pop punk
- Years active: 2010-present
- Label: Throop Records
- Members: Kaustubh "Stubhy" Pandav; Pat Gilroy; Chris Mason; Jeremy Galanes; Phil Kosch; Dave Swick
- Past members: Brad Chagdes; James "Jiggles" Jagielski; Jason Javurek
- Website: thesuperhappyfunclub.com

The Super Happy Fun Club (also known as Super Happy Fun Club, or SHFC) is an American piano rock band from Chicago, Illinois, composed of local Chicago musicians who previously achieved minor to moderate success in the music industry. As such, its name is a tongue-in-cheek reference to the disenchantment many musicians feel towards the music industry. This facetiously jocular attitude is conspicuous in many of the band's songs, while others are more serious reflections on the vicissitudes of life. The current members are Kaustubh "Stubhy" Pandav (vocals), Pat Gilroy (keyboards/backing vocals), Jeremy Galanes (bass, backing vocals), Phil Kosch (guitar, backing vocals), Dave Swick (guitar, backing vocals), and Chris Mason (drums).

== History ==
=== Stubhy and the Bad Habits ===
In 2010, Lucky Boys Confusion frontman Kaustubh "Stubhy" Pandav began working with local Chicago musicians Brad Chagdes (formerly of Logan Square) and James "Jiggles" Jagielski (bassist for fellow Chicago band, Swizzletree) on a new songwriting project. Shortly thereafter, the trio recruited fellow friends and local musicians Pat Gilroy on keyboards, Jason Javurek (whom Pandav had played with in a previous side project, The Insecurities) on guitar, and Chris Mason (formerly of the Teen Idols) on drums. The newly minted band recorded the demos for the songs "Invincible", "Victims" and "Light Pollution" under the auspices of Gilroy and Mason's former bandmate, Jeremy Galanes, who served as producer and engineer. The group was initially named "Stubhy and the Bad Habits" and made their debut on August 7, 2010, at The Beat Kitchen in Chicago, Illinois. A two-song demo including the songs "Light Pollution" and "Victims" was self-released that year. Shortly after the band's debut, Javurek decided to leave the band to follow other pursuits, and was replaced by Galanes on guitar.

=== Super Happy Fun Club and Go Fun Yourself ===
In late 2010, the band began discussing the possibility of changing the name of the group to reflect the more collaborative nature of the band's composition and songwriting. The resulting name, "The Super Happy Fun Club" was intended as a dry pun evoking the disenchantment and weariness that many skilled veterans of local music scenes feel towards the music industry establishment. The band made their debut under this new name on December 5, 2010, again at The Beat Kitchen in Chicago. The group re-released the Stubhy and the Bad Habits demo under the new name and including a new song, "Generations".

During the winter of 2010/2011, SHFC began recording their first EP, Go Fun Yourself. Recording sessions were punctuated with performances in support of AM Taxi at Beat Kitchen, Ludo at Bottom Lounge, and Madina Lake at the Metro. In keeping with the band's DIY approach, almost all recording was done at band members' apartments, and was engineered and produced by Jeremy Galanes. Go Fun Yourself was released on June 4, 2011, and celebrated with a show the same day at Subterranean. The album received generally positive reviews, and the band supported their album with various appearances at fests around Chicago during the summer of 2011, including Roscoe Village Fest, Wells Street Arts Festival, and Oyster Fest. It was during this summer that Jagielski amicably left the band for personal reasons. Jeremy Galanes switched from guitar to bass in place of Jagielski, and Phil Kosch (formerly of Treaty of Paris) was recruited to fill in Galanes' place on guitar.

=== First UK Tour ===
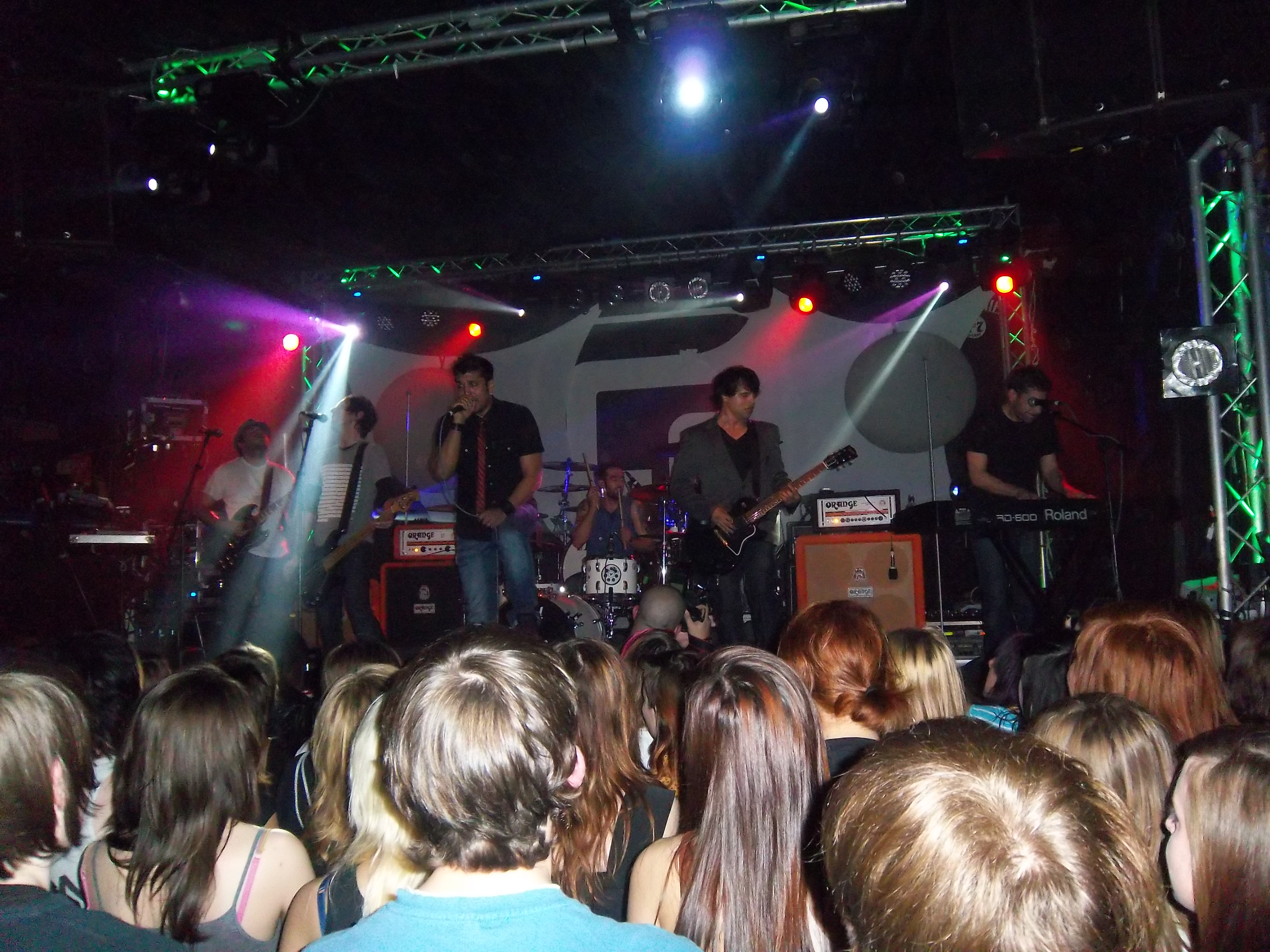
The Super Happy Fun Club performing at the Concorde 2 in Brighton, UK on Nov. 9, 2011 during the Madina Lake WWIII Tour

In November, 2011, SHFC supported fellow Chicago act Madina Lake and English band My Passion on the Madina Lake WWIII European Tour. The tour brought exposure to the band in Germany, France, the Netherlands, Belgium, and the UK. Notably, the band attracted the attention of Rock Sound and Kerrang! magazines in the UK. Partly funded by a Kickstarter campaign, the band established a repertoire with fans in Europe both during the tour as well as through personal videos, songs and other thank you gifts from the campaign.

=== "Way Back" and Summer 2012 ===
After returning from Europe, guitarist Brad Chagdes decided to leave the band for personal reasons, and was replaced by Dave Swick (formerly of Chicago band Reforma, and subsequent tour manager for Madina Lake). SHFC focused on releasing a single that had not been included on the previous EP, Go Fun Yourself. The single "Way Back" was released on iTunes on February 10, 2012. A video for the single produced by Kyle Niezgoda and John Kopanski of Kay Video Productions was filmed at the Bottom Lounge on June 30 – July 1, 2012. The video was released on YouTube on April 9, 2013.

Another single by SHFC, "Okay, Okay", was featured on the Crappy Records Sampler, Have a Crappy Summer alongside Bowling for Soup and Madina Lake. The sampler was released on June 5, 2012.

Again, the band took advantage of Chicago and other regional summer festivals to push their new singles as well as expand their audience. This included performances with Anberlin, Smash Mouth, and Sister Hazel. The most prominent performance for the group was likely their performance as main support for Motion City Soundtrack on the Rock Stage at Milwaukee Summerfest on July 5, 2012.

=== All Funned Up ===
Although writing and recording for a second EP began almost immediately after the band's return from Europe, work in earnest did not begin until the Fall of 2012. Although this was partly due to line-up changes and the festival schedule, it was augmented by personal losses and tragedies. The most prominent of these was the loss of friend and fellow Chicago musician Joe Sell in May, 2012. The loss was particularly acute as Sell had been a founding member of Pandav's prior band, Lucky Boys Confusion. In addition to divorce, breakups, and other issues, the stresses felt by the band during 2012 resulted in the creation of a much more "serious" album than the previous "Go Fun Yourself". A CD Release party for the 10-track album "All Funned Up" was held at Lincoln Hall on May 18, 2013. The album was released under the Throop Records label on June 4, 2013, again to generally positive reviews on both sides of the pond. The album was again engineered and produced by Galanes and includes a collaboration with Plain White T's frontman Tom Higgenson.

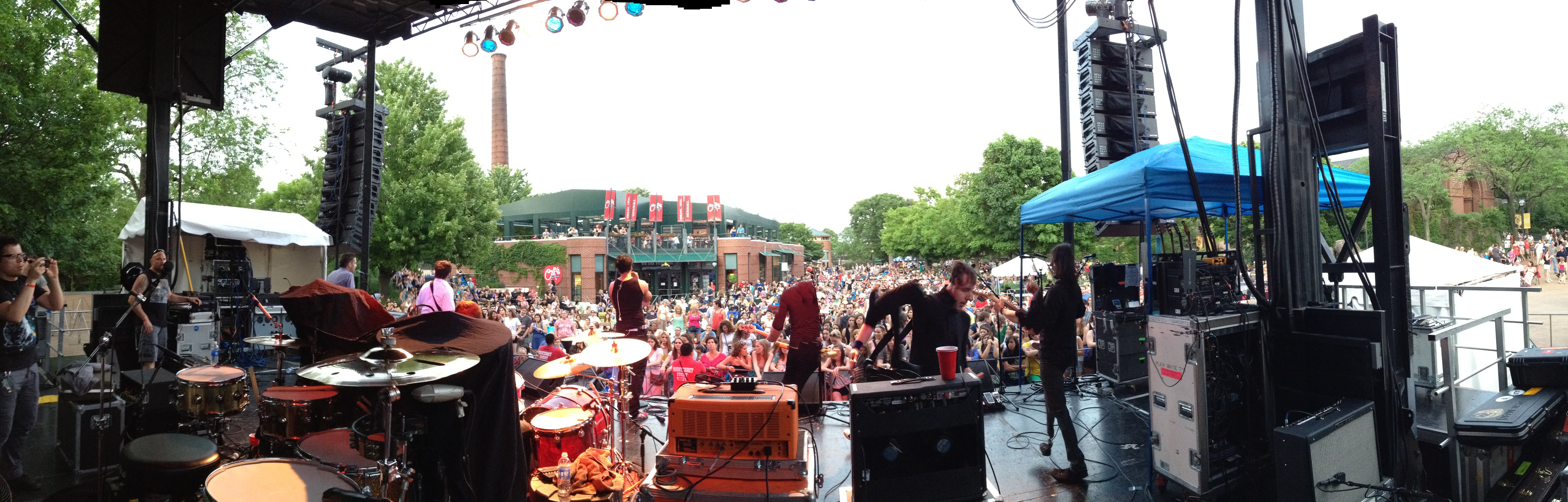
Panorama of The Super Happy Fun Club performing at the Lincoln Park Zoo, 6-22-2013

=== Second UK Tour and Funishment ===
In October 2013, SHFC again accompanied Madina Lake to the UK, this time with English theatrical rockers, Fearless Vampire Killers on the Madina Lake Farewell Celebration and Final UK Tour. Due to scheduling conflicts, SHFC was only able to perform for the latter two weeks of the four-week tour; however, Chris Mason attended the entire tour, pulling double duty by subbing in for Dan Torelli on drums for Madina Lake as well as performing with SHFC. The tour offered unique exposure to the band in many secondary and tertiary markets across the UK. Upon return from the tour, the band began working on their third album, tentatively entitled Funishment.

On May 31, 2014, the band released a new single "Let's Get Out of Here".

== Discography ==
Fall 2010 Demo (Released under "Stubhy and the Bad Habits")

1. Light Pollution
2. Victims

Winter 2010/2011 Demo

1. Light Pollution
2. Victims
3. Generations

Go Fun Yourself (Throop Records, 2011)

1. My Life's a Mess (Yeah Yeah Yeah)
2. Victims
3. London
4. Generation
5. Billy the Entertainer
6. Partners In Crime
7. Light Pollution
8. Invincible

Way Back (single) (Throop Records, 2012)

1. Way Back (The Conflict)

All Funned Up (Throop Records, 2013)

1. Who Drank My Beer
2. Move On
3. Enemy
4. Okay Okay
5. Blinders
6. Fine Distraction (LAX)
7. Good Year
8. Way Back (The Conflict)
9. Angels Cry
10. Plus One

Let's Get Out of Here (single) (Throop Records, 2014)

1. Let's Get Out of Here
