= MTV Party to Go 10 =

MTV Party To Go Volume 10

Compilation album by Various artists
- Released: October 29, 1996
- Genre: Dance, Pop-rap
- Length: 54:14
- Label: Tommy Boy Records

Various artists chronology
MTV Party to Go 9 (1996)	MTV Party To Go Volume 10 (1996)	MTV Party to Go 1998 (1997)

Professional ratings
Review scores
Source	Rating
Allmusic	3/5 stars

MTV Party To Go Volume 10 was the tenth album in the MTV Party To Go series. The album was certified gold in January 1997 by the RIAA.

== Track listing ==
1. "This Is Your Night" (Berman House Mix) – Amber
2. "Do You Miss Me?" (Dreamhouse Mix) – Jocelyn Enriquez
3. "Your Loving Arms" (Soundfactory Vocal Mix) – Billie Ray Martin
4. "Be My Lover" (Club Mix) – La Bouche
5. "Macarena" (Radio Version) – Los Del Rio
6. "It's All the Way Live (Now)" (Timber Mix) – Coolio
7. "Tha Crossroads" (DJ U-Neek's Mo Thug Remix) – Bone Thugs-N-Harmony
8. "Lady" (Clean Street Version) – D'Angelo featuring AZ
9. "Ain't Nobody" (Main Mix) – Monica featuring Treach
10. "Tonite's tha Night" (Redman Clean Remix) – Kris Kross
11. "California Love" (Long Radio Edit) – 2Pac featuring Dr. Dre
12. "You're the One" (LP Version) – SWV
