= Sally Thurer =

American artist

- Born: Boston, Massachusetts
- Education: The Yale School of Art
- Known for: Illustrator and artist
- Website: Official website

Sally Thurer was born in Boston, Massachusetts, United States of America. She's an independent art director, illustrator and animator based in Brooklyn. Sally Thurer received her MFA in graphic design at The Yale School of Art. She started her career at Mass Appeal Magazine and acted as art director until 2007 when she became creative director of their new title, Missbehave from 2007 to 2009. She is also an image maker producing illustrations, wrapping paper, websites and digital prints for fabric. Some of her work can also be seen in The New York Times, Lucky Peach, The Village Voice, Bloomberg View and on MTV She is also the former Head of Experiential Methodology and Critical Theory at MTV. Thurer has made illustrations for such media as The Fader. She also likes making pedagogical account on Instagram. She worked with the likes of Burton, Tommy Boy Records, Volume/C-Lab.

== Selected projects ==
- Shadow Rose, Digital fabric patterns & seasonal brand identity (2014)
- Acid Surf (2014)
- Roboshop (2013)
- iPad Fashion Story for Bullett Magazine (2013)
- #!#!#!#!#!#!#!# (2013)
- NYC Food Film Festival, POSTER AND VIDEO (2012)
