= Hedonist (disambiguation) =

A hedonist is someone devoted to hedonism.

Hedonist may also refer to:

== People ==
- A given name or nickname.
  - Chief Hedonist, a fictional character from The Extremist, comic book miniseries.

== Films ==
- The Hedonist (1994), a ski film produced by Matchstick Productions.
- The Hedonist (2010), Australian thriller.
- Bogan (transl. Hedonist / Pleasure seeker) (2017), Indian Tamil-language supernatural action thriller.

== Music ==
- Hedonist Records, a record label of Morgan James, American singer, songwriter, and actress.
- Hedonist (2005), album by Martin Solveig, French DJ, singer, songwriter and record producer.

=== Songs ===
- "The Hedonist" (1988), from The House of Love by The House of Love, English alternative rock.
  - "Hedonist" (1990), rerecorded on The House of Love.
- "The Hedonist" (1992), from Foolish Thing Desire by Daniel Ash, English musician, songwriter and singer.
- "Hedonist" (2000), from The All American by Chainsaw Kittens, American alternative rock.
- "Hedonist" (2001), from Operation Hypocrite by Die So Fluid, English hard rock.
- "Hedonist" (2009), from Closing Arguments by Lucky Boys Confusion, American rock.
- "The Hedonist" (2012), from 2 by Ned Collette & Wirewalker, Australian folk-rock.
- "The Hedonist" (2013), from Darker Lights by Papermaps, Canadian indie rock.
- "Hedonist" (2016), from Bad Omens by Bad Omens, American heavy metal.
- "Hedonist (Recharged)" (2024), from Concrete Jungle (The OST), featuring Wargasm and by Bad Omens, American heavy metal.
- "Hedonist" (2025), from Duél by Jinjer, Ukrainian metalcore.

== Other uses ==
- Hedonist Post (2015–), quarterly magazine by Paul Ripke, German fashion and sports photographer and music video director.
- Hedonist (1970), luxury yacht by Camper and Nicholsons, English yacht design and manufacturing company.
- Hedonist, Thoroughbred racehorse and winner of the 1998 Santa Anita Oaks. Foaled by Alydeed.
- Hedonist International, a network of action-oriented left-wing groups.

== See also ==
- Hedonism (disambiguation)
