= Count On My Love (disambiguation) =

Count On My Love is the second studio album, and the major-label debut, of Tessanne Chin, released on July 1, 2014.

"Count On My Love" may also refer to:

- "Count On My Love", song by Liz Phair from Somebody's Miracle used in the film No Reervations
- "Count On My Love", by Kai (band) from Kai (Kai album) composed by Tristan Bishop

== See also ==
- "Count On Me (Jefferson Starship song)" Top-10 single Earth (Jefferson Starship album) with the line "you can count on my love"
