= Kim Matulova =

American fashion model and actress (born 1980)

- Modeling information
- Height: 5 ft 9 in (1.75 m)
- Hair color: Blonde
- Eye color: Blue / green
- Agency: Ford

Kim Matulova is an American fashion model and actress. Her father, Wayne Rogers, was a former sports wear designer and her mother was a civil engineer. She grew up in Sag Harbor, New York and was discovered by photographer Arthur Elgort at the age of 9.

As a child she modelled for J Crew with Matthew Barney and she played the role of Young Angelique in a 1992 episode (Season 1, Episode 5,733) of the TV series All My Children.

She starred in the James Toback NYC feature Black & White (1999) and the Nemo Librizzi film A Night at the Opera (2009). She also appeared in the 2003 TV movie Undefeated and in the pilot episode (2009) of the TV series Royal Pains.

She has modeled for Levis, Banana Republic, Kangol, Supreme, Seventeen Magazine, Betsey Johnson, DELiA*s (for which she modeled from 15 to 21 years old and is considered as one of their most recognizable models) and appeared in every issue of Missbehave Magazine. She is known for being Ricky Powell's muse.

She is also known for being the face of Melody Logan on the V. C. Andrews Logan book series.

On September 13, 2010, she was asked by Betsey Johnson to be one of the star models of her Spring/Summer 2011 Ready-to-Wear fashion show, during which she came down carrying a skateboard and was instructed to ride it while wearing open-toed platform heels. However, she found herself falling to the ground and losing one of her shoes, and she had to get off and shoulder her skateboard all the way back up the catwalk.

In 2012 she began working for the women's collection of the contemporary fashion and streetwear brand Black Scale VV. Kim currently lives in New York and she works in the design aspect of jewellery and fashion.
