= Closing Arguments (album) =

Studio album by Lucky Boys Confusion
- Released: May 26, 2009 (digital); June 23, 2009 (physical)
- Genre: Alternative rock
- Length: 42:47
- Label: Townstyle Music

Lucky Boys Confusion chronology
Live and Acoustic (Recorded at the Beat Kitchen) (2007)	Closing Arguments (2009)

Closing Arguments is the fourth full-length studio album by American rock band Lucky Boys Confusion, released in 2009. It is their first full-length release since being dropped by Elektra Records, and also their first since 2003's Commitment. It is also their last to be recorded with guitarist and founding member Joe Sell before his death in May 2012.

The album is composed of older b-sides and demos, plus a new song, "This Town Ain't Big Enough for Both of Us." "Biggest Mistake" was previously released on Stubhy's side project Shock Stars' 2007 EP Feel for a Heartbeat. "When Bad News Gets Worse" was previously released on Lucky Boys Confusion's 2006 EP How to Get Out Alive with a different chorus and mix.

Closing Arguments was released digitally on May 26, 2009 to iTunes and Amazon MP3. The physical release was on June 23, 2009.

== Critical reception ==
The album was rated two out of five stars by Sloane Daley of Punknews.org, who wrote that it was "only recommended for completists and long-time fans."

== Songs in Closing Arguments ==
1. "This Town Ain't Big Enough for Both of Us" – 4:25
2. "Biggest Mistake" – 3:15
3. "18 Years" – 2:56
4. "Sidewalk Graves" – 3:40
5. "Blood Drops" – 5:13
6. "Hedonist II" – 2:56
7. "Shoulda Been Me" – 3:19
8. "Paint" – 3:04
9. "748" – 3:30
10. "City of God" – 2:59
11. "Leave On the Light" – 3:51
12. "When Bad News Gets Worse (Original Version)" – 3:45
