= MTV Party to Go 6 =

MTV Party To Go Volume 6

Compilation album by Various artists
- Released: November 22, 1994
- Genre: Dance
- Length: 56:46
- Label: Tommy Boy Records

Various artists chronology
MTV Party to Go 5 (1994)	MTV Party To Go Volume 6 (1994)	MTV Party to Go 7 (1995)

Professional ratings
Review scores
Source	Rating
Allmusic	3/5 stars
Spin Alternative Record Guide	7/10

MTV Party To Go Volume 6 was the sixth album in the MTV Party To Go series. The album was certified gold on January 30, 1995, by the RIAA.

== Track listing ==
1. "Move It Like This" (Extended Mix) – K7
2. "Fantastic Voyage" (Timber Mix) – Coolio
3. "Cantaloop (Flip Fantasia)" (Ultimix) – US3
4. "100% Pure Love" (Club Mix) – Crystal Waters
5. "Can We Talk" – Tevin Campbell
6. "Your Body's Callin'" – R. Kelly
7. "Getto Jam" – Domino
8. "Regulate" – Warren G
9. "All That She Wants" (Extended Mix) – Ace of Base
10. "Back & Forth" (Mr. Lee's Club Mix) – Aaliyah
11. "Shoop" (Ghetto Lab Full Rub Mix) – Salt-N-Pepa
12. "Award Tour" (Extended Mix) – A Tribe Called Quest
13. "I Swear" – All-4-One

== Charts ==
=== Weekly charts ===
Chart (1994–1995)	Peak position
US Billboard 200	54

=== Year-end charts ===
Chart (1995)	Position
US Billboard 200	151
