= MTV Party to Go 2 =

MTV Party To Go Volume 2

Compilation album by Various artists
- Released: May 26, 1992
- Genre: Dance
- Length: 61:30
- Label: Tommy Boy Records

Various artists chronology
MTV Party to Go 1 (1991)	MTV Party To Go Volume 2 (1992)	MTV Party to Go 3 (1993)

Professional ratings
Review scores
Source	Rating
AllMusic	4/5 stars
Spin Alternative Record Guide	9/10

MTV Party To Go Volume 2 was the second album in the MTV Party To Go series. The album was certified gold on August 19, 1992, and platinum on May 25, 1994, by the RIAA.

== Track listing ==
1. "Sadeness Part 1" (Extended Trance Mix) – Enigma
2. "Set Adrift on Memory Bliss" (Extended Mix) – P.M. Dawn
3. "Summertime" (Extended Club Mix) – DJ Jazzy Jeff & The Fresh Prince
4. "O.P.P." (Ultimix Remix) – Naughty by Nature
5. "Playground" (Young Jack Club 12″ Mix) – Another Bad Creation
6. "Motownphilly" (LP Version) – Boyz II Men
7. "All 4 Love" (LP Version) – Color Me Badd
8. "Let's Talk About Sex" (Original Recipe Club Mix) – Salt-N-Pepa
9. "Here We Go Let's Rock & Roll" (Clivilles & Cole Rockin' in 91 Mix) – C+C Music Factory
10. "Now That We Found Love" (Club Version) – Heavy D. & The Boyz
11. "Good Vibrations" (Ultimix Remix) – Marky Mark and the Funky Bunch featuring Loleatta Holloway
12. "3 AM Eternal" (Live at the SSL Extended Mix) – The KLF
