= Edith Raymond Locke =

Austrian-American journalist and television producer (1921–2020)

Edie Locke (3 August 1921 - 23 August 2020) was an Austrian-American magazine editor and television producer and presenter. She was editor-in-chief of Mademoiselle from 1971 through 1979.

== Early life ==
Edith Rosenberg Laub was born in Vienna on 3 August 1921 to Dora Hochburg Laub and Herman Laub, who was a department store buyer. She had one younger brother who died as an infant. In 1938, when Hitler invaded Vienna, she and other Jewish students were expelled from her school and her father was fired. Locke was in 1939 able to obtain a US visa and fled, first by train to Cherbourg, then on the Aquitania to New York; her parents were unable to obtain U.S. visas and fled to England. Locke lived in Brooklyn, where the family had relatives who took her in, worked in a toothpaste factory, and took courses at Brooklyn College, including English lessons, as she had immigrated speaking no English.

== Publishing and fashion career ==
Locke got a job as a secretary at Harper's Bazaar, a monthly women's magazine. She became an assistant editor at Junior Bazaar. She wrote a monthly newsletter about fashion for an advertising agency, which was read by Mademoiselle's editor-in-chief Betsey Blackwell, who hired Locke in the early 1950s as an associate fashion editor. In 1971 Blackwell retired and Locke became the magazine's editor-in-chief. She was fired in 1979 by Alexander Liberman, then editorial director of Conde Nast, because he wanted a "lighter and sexier" magazine, similar to competitor Cosmopolitan, than the issues-heavy version Locke was producing. During her time at Mademoiselle she worked with and mentored multiple fashion designers. Proteges she mentored when they were launching their careers included Betsey Johnson, Donna Karan, and Ralph Lauren.

Locke hosted and produced You! Magazine for USA Network starting in 1981 and later a regular fashion segment for Attitudes, a daily lifestyle show on Lifetime.

== Legacy ==
The Christian Science Monitor in 1986 said she had "helped shape the way a whole generation looked and imagined themselves." In 2016 the Courtauld Institute of Art included her in Documenting Fashion, a series of oral history interviews about the fashion industry.

== Personal life ==
Locke met Ralph Locke in the early 1960s on a trip to St. Croix, where he was the manager of the Buccaneer Hotel, and they married in 1963. The couple had a daughter and grandchildren. From 1994, she lived in Los Angeles. She died on 23 August 2020, at her home in Thousand Oaks.
