= Mass Appeal (media) =

American media and content company

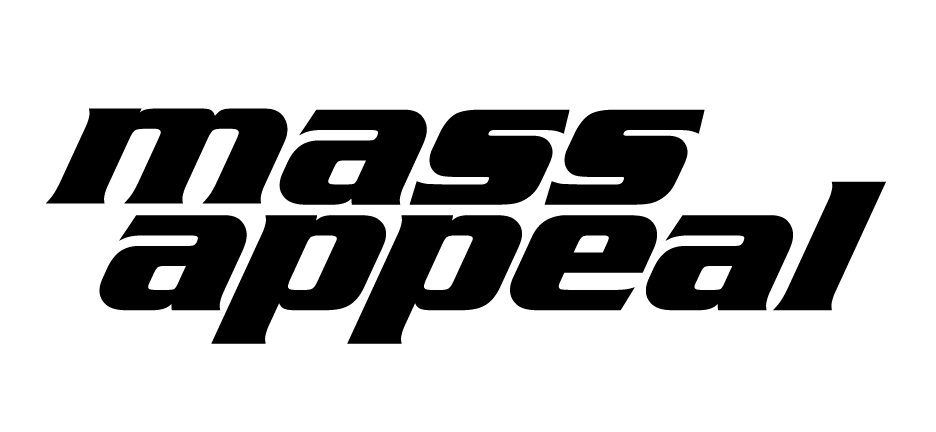
- Type: Limited liability company
- Industry: Mass media
- Founded: 1996; 30 years ago
- Headquarters: New York City, U.S.
- Subsidiaries: Mass Appeal magazine Mass Appeal Records; Decon
- Website: www.massappeal.com

Mass Appeal is an American media and content company based in New York City. The name originates from the Gang Starr song of the same name from the album Hard to Earn (1994). The company was founded in 1996 as a graffiti fanzine and since has grown to encompass a magazine, website, film, television, music label and creative agency.

== History ==
Mass Appeal published the first issue of Mass Appeal magazine in 1996. Initially, it covered a wide variety of pop culture topics such as graffiti culture, hip-hop, video games, cars and movies. It often provided coverage of young artists and performers that contributed to and shaped contemporary hip-hop culture. The magazine was started by Patrick Elasik (deceased) and Adrian Moeller and included columnists such as R.A. the Rugged Man, Matt Goias, Mister Cartoon, Estevan Oriol and Reas.

Mass Appeal launched a spin-off called Missbehave in 2006 that suspended publication in 2008. In 2013 Mass Appeal relaunched and resumed print with Earl Sweatshirt and Blake Anderson on the cover of Issue 52.

On April 10, 2013, Mass Appeal was revived when a group of investors, including American rapper Nas, decided to relaunch and expand the Mass Appeal brand. The deal included merging with creative firm Decon and White Owl Capital Partners, an early stage investment firm with business interests in technology, media and energy located in North America, Europe and China.

In June 2018, Mass Appeal signed a music distribution deal with Universal Music Group, which includes the rights to Nas' eleventh studio album Nasir, as well as future releases by DJ Shadow, J Dilla and Run the Jewels.

== Projects ==
=== Music ===
Mass Appeal Records is an American independent record label founded in 2014 by Mass Appeal. It is an urban alternative focused label with a roster of almost a dozen artists. The first project released on the label was Run the Jewels 2 (2014). The album received global critical acclaim and earned the number 1 spot on Pitchfork's "Top 50 Albums of 2014" year-end list. The label has since gone on to release music from artists including Nas, Run the Jewels, Fashawn, Bishop Nehru, Boldy James, J Dilla, Dave East, Mannie Fresh, Cuz Lightyear and DJ Shadow. In May 2017, Mass Appeal announced a joint venture publishing company with Pulse Music Group. In June 2018, a new partnership with Universal Music Group was announced with the companies entering into a multi-year global agreement.

=== Film and TV ===
In 2013, Mass Appeal entered in a production partnership with CNN Films to produce a documentary, entitled Fresh Dressed (2015), about hip-hop and fashion. The documentary was accepted to the prestigious Sundance Film Festival where it was sold to Samuel Goldwyn Films and StyleHaul.

TBS, a division of Turner, has collaborated with Mass Appeal and greenlit Storyville, a new digital animated series. The top-rated network is also in development on Think B.I.G., a scripted series based loosely on lyrics by the late Notorious B.I.G. The two projects are the first to emerge from a new strategic content partnership between TBS and Mass Appeal.

In 2017, Mass Appeal released Burn Motherfucker, Burn! on Showtime, a 2-hour documentary film exploring the lives of the people at the flashpoint of the LA riots, 25 years after the uprising made national headlines and highlighted the racial divide in America.

Word Is Bond, directed by Sacha Jenkins, was released in 2018 and explored the art of lyricism. What was born on the streets of the South Bronx has now taken root globally and the young poets of New York have helped to spawn regional dialects everywhere. Featuring excursions with artists like Nas, Tech N9ne, J. Cole, Rapsody and Anderson .Paak, the film explores the different dimensions that hip-hop poetics occupy.

In 2018, Rapture was released on Netflix. This eight part docu-series featuring artists such as Nas, 2 Chainz, Dave East, T.I., G-Eazy, Rapsody, Logic, A Boogie wit da Hoodie and Just Blaze.

=== Digital ===
Mass Appeal Digital has produced digital video series including WATCHxWITNESS, its premiere photographic documentary series, and Rhythm Roulette, a producer-driven series in which artists visit a music store, select three records at random, then create an instrumental on the spot, sampling from the three random records they chose. Since 2013, Rhythm Roulette has attracted talent such as 9th Wonder, Mannie Fresh, Just Blaze and many more. On the Grind is a series which examines the intersection of skate and creativity. Time Pieces is a series of short films that has featured Pharrell Williams, Jay Electronica, and Too Short. Off tha' Wall is its comedic interview series. Open Space is an interview series that highlights creative people of all types in a context where they are free to speak their minds―the series has featured the likes of Prodigy and Fat Joe as well as early interviews with upcoming acts such as Trippie Redd, Tekashi 6ix9ine, and Ski Mask the Slump God. The Mass Appeal Collection is a series of short documentaries focusing on up-and-coming artists and established stars. The Mass Appeal Collection has highlighted artists in their home towns including Post Malone in Dallas, Robb Banks in South Florida, and Young King Dave in Middletown, New Jersey, as well as Quality Control's emergent female rap duo City Girls. Shop Talk is a Mass Appeal original series where musicians are invited to a local shop to check out what it is they have to offer. American rappers Post Malone, Dave East, and Playboi Carti have all appeared on the series. On Mass Appeal's original series, Super, they ask artists to explain what their superhero alter-egos would be, and Mass Appeal's illustrators bring those characters to life. Kendrick Lamar, Fat Joe, and Lil Yachty have all taken part in the animated series. After initially appearing on Mass Appeal's YouTube channel as the unofficial music video for Migos' "Bitch Dab" (later titled "Look at My Dab"), the spontaneous music video by the American hip-hop group went viral, with over 13 million views on YouTube. In 2019, the Digital department began reconfiguration efforts.

=== Creative ===
The agency division of Decon was relaunched under the Mass Appeal banner in 2013. Decon co-founder Jason Goldwatch still regularly contributes to projects. Mass Appeal Creative clients include Sprite, HBO and Under Armour.

In 2016, Mass Appeal partnered with HBO to launch a campaign for the sixth season of Game of Thrones, entitled "Art the Throne"―going on to win the Bronze Clio and Webby People's Voice awards.

=== MassAppeal.com ===
MassAppeal.com is an outlet for youth-spawned urban culture. The site features daily original video and also publishes social content direct to various platforms. The site has been under reconfiguration since the beginning of 2018.

== See also ==
- BuzzFeed
- Mic
- Vice Media
