= Kai (group) =

Asian-American R&B musical group

- Origin: San Francisco, California, U.S.
- Genre: R&B
- Years active: 1992–2001, 2017
- Past members: Andrew "Dru" Gapuz; Anthony "AC" Lorenzo (deceased); Geoffrey "Geof" Lintao; Quincy "Q" Victoria; Leo Chan; Errol Viray; Andrey "Drey" Silva; Johnny Misa

Kai was an Asian-American R&B musical group from the San Francisco Bay Area, active from 1992 to 2001.

== Career ==
The group was formed when Anthony "AC" Lorenzo invited Andrew "Dru" Gapuz, Geoffrey "Geof" Lintao, Quincy "Q" Victoria and Leo Chan to perform at a San Francisco benefit concert. Following a group split, AC, Dru and Leo began working as a trio and in 1995, added Errol Viray and AC's cousin Andrey "Drey" Silva.

Originally named APEX, the group changed its name to Kai, an abbreviated version of the Tagalog word kaibigan, which means "friend". They were signed to HB Records, a local studio and began working on an album. Their debut single, "Say You'll Stay" was released shortly after and received strong radio play. This helped them get signed by Geffen in 1997. In 1998, they released their self-titled debut album on Geffen, making them the second Filipino American recording artist to release an album on a major record label (Jocelyn Enriquez was the first, releasing Jocelyn on Tommy Boy Records in 1997). Their only charting single was the previously mentioned "Say You'll Stay" which reached No. 59 on the Billboard Hot 100. In that same year, they were also featured in an issue of Vibe Magazine alongside rap group the Mountain Brothers in an article promoting up-and-coming Asian-American talent in the music industry.

In 2000, as a promise to his family to complete his education, Andrew Gapuz left the group. He was replaced by Johnny Misa, amidst a controversy that Misa was already slated to fill a vacated spot in the Los Angeles based a cappella group Ja'a. With Misa in the lineup, Kai released their second album, The Promise under C3D Records with singles "Every Little Thing" and "It Might Be You". They toured for the album with the backup band Deviation.

In a similar fashion to other Filipino American recording artists, both of Kai's albums were recorded in English and also featured covers of songs which were prominent in the 1970s and 1980s. Also in similar fashion to their peers, they were known to sing Tagalog covers at their live performances, as well as other popular English covers that were more recent.

Throughout their career, Kai also released exclusive songs not featured on their albums on various compilation albums. In 1998, "Last to Know" was featured on Serenade Volume 1, a compilation released by Filipino American record label Classified Records. Kai also contributed to two compilations released by popular social networking website AsianAvenue.com. A version of "The Promise", which would later be modified before it became the title track of their second album, was released on AsianAvenue.com Plugged In Volume 1 in 1999 and a cover of Shai's "Come with Me" with Deviation was released on AsianAvenue.com Plugged In Volume 3 in 2001.

In 2001, Kai officially retired as a group. With the group's lack of a consistent webpage throughout their career and popular sites such as Myspace or Wikipedia which are typically used by recording artists and their fans to convey information to a wider audience not yet developed, the circumstances surrounding their retirement remain a mystery.

Members Andrey Silva and Errol Viray attempted to continue under the name Kai as a duo shortly after the group's initial breakup. This venture, however, was short-lived.

The members of Kai reunited on December 9, 2017, to perform at AC Kaibigan, a tribute to late founder AC Lorenzo, which took place at Lorenzo's alma mater, James Logan High School. Other performing groups included HoneyLuv (Premiere), Pinay, Drop N Harmony, One Vo1ce, and other Filipino-American R&B groups.

== Legacy ==
Kai was the first of many Filipino American R&B/pop artists/groups of the late 1990s and early 2000s that flooded the independent music scene throughout California, the state with the largest Filipino American population in the United States, especially in the San Francisco Bay Area. Other groups and artists included in this influx were Jocelyn Enriquez, Ecclesia, Pinay, Premiere, Julie Plug, Kim Del Fierro, One Vo1ce, Innerlude, DnH (Drop N Harmony), Ja'a, Devotion, and CQuence. In 2006, Kid Heroes Productions featured Kai's "Something Inside Me" music video on their Bootleg Visuals Volume 1 release, which featured music videos from Filipino American recording artists.

Kai is often miscited as the artist of certain songs on music sharing websites such as imeem or peer-to-peer networks such as Kazaa or BitTorrent. Most notably, they are incorrectly credited with R&B group Portrait's "How Deep Is Your Love", which was released three years before Kai's debut album. They are also miscited as being the artists of "Forever" and "Twinkle Twinkle", recorded by R&B groups Damage and Simplicity, respectively.

== Members ==
- Leo Chan (1992–2001)
- Andrew Gapuz (1992–2000)
- AC Lorenzo (1992–2001)
- Andrey Silva (1995–2001)
- Errol Viray (1995–2001)
- Johnny Misa (2000–2001)

== Discography ==
=== Albums ===
- Kai (1998), MCA Music Inc./Geffen
- The Promise (2000), Kai Music Ent./C3D Records

=== Singles ===
- "Something Inside Me"
- "Say You'll Stay"
- "Every Little Thing"
- "It Might Be You"
- "Last to Know"

=== Compilation appearances ===
- "Last to Know" - Serenade Volume 1 (1998), Classified Records
- "The Promise" - AsianAvenue.com Plugged In Volume 1 (1999), AsianAvenue.com
- "Come with Me" (Deviation featuring Drey Silva & Errol Viray) - AsianAvenue.com Plugged In Volume 3 (2001), AsianAvenue.com
- "Something Inside Me" (music video) - Bootleg Visuals Volume 1 (2006), Kid Heroes Productions
