= MTV Party to Go 9 =

MTV Party To Go Volume 9

Compilation album by Various artists
- Released: July 9, 1996
- Genre: Dance
- Label: Tommy Boy Records

Various artists chronology
MTV Party to Go 8 (1995)	MTV Party To Go Volume 9 (1996)	MTV Party to Go 10 (1996)

Professional ratings
Review scores
Source	Rating
Allmusic	4.5/5 stars

MTV Party To Go Volume 9 was the ninth album in the MTV Party To Go series. The album was certified gold on January 16, 1997, by the RIAA.

== Track listing ==
1. "1, 2, 3, 4 (Sumpin' New)" (Timber Extended Mix) – Coolio
2. "Missing" (Todd Terry Club Mix) – Everything but the Girl
3. "Set U Free" (Fever Mix Edit) – Planet Soul
4. "Beautiful Life" (Extended 12" Mix) – Ace of Base
5. "Run Away" (Club Attack Mix) – Real McCoy
6. "You Remind Me of Something" (Original Mix) – R. Kelly
7. "Hey Lover" (Radio Edit) – LL Cool J
8. "One More Chance" (Radio Edit) – The Notorious B.I.G.*
9. "Baby" (Extended LP Version) – Brandy*
10. "Get On Up" (Instant Flava Mix) – Jodeci**
11. "Tell Me" (Extended LP Mix) – Groove Theory
12. "Throw Your Hands Up" (Extended 12" Mix) – L.V.

* Misprinted in reverse order
** Misprinted as "Get Up On It"
