= MTV Party to Go Platinum Mix =

Compilation album by Various artists
- Released: October 6, 1998
- Genre: Dance, rap/hop
- Length: 59:48
- Label: Tommy Boy Records

MTV Party to Go chronology
MTV Party to Go 1998 (1997)	MTV Party to Go Platinum Mix (1998)	MTV Party to Go 1999 (1998)

Professional ratings
Review scores
Source	Rating
Allmusic	link

MTV Party to Go Platinum Mix was the twelfth album in the MTV Party to Go series. The majority of songs on this album have appeared on previous volumes of the Party To Go series.

== Track listing ==
1. California Love – 2Pac featuring Dr. Dre
2. Woo Hah!! Got You All in Check – Busta Rhymes
3. Creep – TLC
4. Shoop – Salt-N-Pepa
5. Nuthin' but a "G" Thang – Dr. Dre featuring Snoop Doggy Dogg
6. Real Love – Mary J. Blige
7. Summertime – DJ Jazzy Jeff & The Fresh Prince
8. Love Will Never Do (Without You) – Janet Jackson
9. This Is How We Do It – Montell Jordan
10. Scenario – A Tribe Called Quest
11. O.P.P. – Naughty by Nature
12. Here Comes the Hotstepper – Ini Kamoze
13. Express Yourself – Madonna
14. Now That We Found Love – Heavy D & The Boyz
