= MTV Party to Go 7 =

MTV Party To Go Volume 7

Compilation album by Various artists
- Released: October 31, 1995
- Genre: Dance
- Length: 53:53
- Label: Tommy Boy

Various artists chronology
MTV Party to Go 6 (1994)	MTV Party To Go Volume 7 (1995)	MTV Party to Go 8 (1995)

Professional ratings
Review scores
Source	Rating
Allmusic	4.5/5 stars

MTV Party To Go Volume 7 was the seventh album in MTV's Party To Go series. The album was certified gold on April 10, 1996, by the RIAA.

== Track listing ==
1. "Freak Like Me" (LP Version) – Adina Howard
2. "Human Nature" (Howie Tee Remix) – Madonna
3. "Candy Rain" (Heavy D & Trackmasters Mix) – Soul for Real
4. "Here Comes the Hotstepper" (Heartical Mix) – Ini Kamoze
5. "This Is How We Do It" (LP Version) – Montell Jordan
6. "Short Short Man" (Club Mix) – 20 Fingers
7. "Thuggish Ruggish Bone" (EP Version) – Bone Thugs-N-Harmony
8. "Dear Mama" (Radio Version) – 2Pac
9. "Can't You See" (Vocal Version) – Total featuring The Notorious B.I.G.
10. "I Wanna Be Down" (The Human Rhythm Hip Hop Remix) – Brandy
11. "Freek'n You" (Freek-A-Pella Mix) – Jodeci
12. "I'll Make Love to You" (LP Version) – Boyz II Men

== Charts ==
=== Weekly charts ===
Chart (1995)	Peak position
US Billboard 200	54

=== Year-end charts ===
Chart (1996)	Position
US Billboard 200	187
