= MTV Party to Go 5 =

MTV Party To Go Volume 5

Compilation album by Various artists
- Released: May 31, 1994
- Genre: Dance
- Length: 65:08
- Label: Tommy Boy Records

Various artists chronology
MTV Party to Go 4 (1993)	MTV Party To Go Volume 5 (1994)	MTV Party to Go 6 (1994)

Professional ratings
Review scores
Source	Rating
Allmusic	4.5/5 stars
Spin Alternative Record Guide	5/10

MTV Party To Go Volume 5 was the fifth album in MTV's Party To Go series. The album was certified Gold on September 20, 1994, by the RIAA.

== Track listing ==
1. "Anniversary (Quiet Storm)" – Tony! Toni! Toné!
2. "Let Me Ride" (Extra Clean Radio Edit) – Dr. Dre
3. "Boom! Shake the Room" (Ultimix) – DJ Jazzy Jeff & The Fresh Prince
4. "Slam" (Ultimix) – Onyx
5. "Informer" (Ultimix) – Snow
6. "I Get Around" (Remix) – 2Pac
7. "Come Baby Come" (Ultimix) – K7
8. "Whoomp! (There It Is)" (WPGC Remix) – Tag Team
9. "Hey Mr. D.J." (Maurice's Club Mix W/Rap) – Zhané
10. "What Is Love" (12″ Mix) – Haddaway
11. "Weak" (Bam Jam Jeep Mix) – SWV
12. "Knockin' Da Boots" (LP Version) – H-Town
