= FannyPack =

American electronic/hip hop group

- Origin: Brooklyn, New York City, U.S.
- Genres: Booty bass, electro, rap
- Years active: 2002–2007
- Label: Tommy Boy Entertainment
- Past members: Jessibel Suthiwong; Belinda Lovell; Cat Hartwell; Matt Goias "Fancy"

FannyPack was a New York City-based electronic/hip hop group that was formed in 2002 by music producers Matt Goias and "Fancy". The band featured vocals by Jessibel Suthiwong, Belinda Lovell, and Cat Hartwell.

The group's 2003 debut album, So Stylistic, was released in the United States by Tommy Boy Records and featured the hit single "Cameltoe". "Cameltoe" peaked at number 38 in Australia. In 2005, Fannypack released their follow-up LP, See You Next Tuesday, which featured guest vocals by Brooke Lugo and dancehall superstar Mr. Vegas.

After FannyPack, Cat Hartwell joined the band Holy Hail. Belinda Lovell joined the group Retro Glam and worked on a solo album.

== Discography ==
Studio albums

- So Stylistic (Label: Tommy Boy Entertainment) (2003)
- See You Next Tuesday (Label: Tommy Boy Entertainment) (2005)

Compilation albums

- Ghetto Bootleg (Label: Tommy Boy Entertainment) (2008)

Post-FannyPack

- Lil' Too Late (single) (with Skee-Lo, Belinda Lovell, REDStar & D.J. Cazz) (Premier Ent. Group) (2011)

Belinda Lovell as a member of "Retro Glam"

- Just for One Night (single) (with D.J. Cazz) (Premier Ent. Group) (2012)

== Appearances ==
- "Cameltoe" (featured on Harold & Kumar Go to White Castle and Jackass 3.5)
- "You Gotta Know" (featured on the Kitsuné release Kitsuné X)
- "Pop Dat Thing" (featured on the Moveltraxx release Da Movelt Posse)
- "Hey Mami" (featured on Dance Central, The Fast and the Furious: Tokyo Drift in Han's nightclub and Still Waiting...)
- "Seven One Eight" (featured on I Now Pronounce You Chuck and Larry, Don't Trust the B— in Apartment 23 episode "Paris...")
- "Nu Nu" (Double J & Hayze Extended mix) (featured in Stick It, The L Word, and on Fired Up)
- "Fire Fire" (with Mr. Vegas) (featured in Stick It)

Belinda Lovell as part of Retro Glam has also appeared in:

- "Just for One Night" (featured in Super Swag)
- "Lil Too Late" (featured in Bunnies On Deck)
- "Live Without Him" (featured in Bunnies On Deck)

== Tours ==
Opened for Madonna on her 2006 Confessions Tour in the United States.
