= Undefeated (2003 film) =

- Written by: John Leguizamo; Frank Pugliese
- Directed by: John Leguizamo
- Starring: John Leguizamo; Clifton Collins Jr.
- Music by: Juju Gigante; Psycho Les; Roy Nathanson; Bill Ware
- Country of origin: United States
- Original language: English

Production
- Producers: Scott Macaulay; Robin O'Hara; Jeffrey Sharp
- Cinematography: Enrique Chediak
- Editor: Bill Pankow
- Running time: 92 minutes
- Production company: HBO Films

Original release
- Network: HBO
- Release: July 26, 2003

Undefeated is a 2003 HBO television film starring and directed by John Leguizamo.

== Storyline ==
This film follows a boxer who climbs the ranks as a featherweight fighter who has never lost a match. The story starts in Queens, New York with Leguizamo training and then fighting in a Golden Gloves boxing match. When his brother who owned a convenience store dies, he is faced with the decision of never boxing again. He soon turns pro and goes to win the championship bout. Quickly the champ struggles with success, entourage, and relationships with his girlfriend as well as his manager.

== Cast ==
- John Leguizamo as Lex Vargas
- Clifton Collins Jr. as "Loco"
- Adrian Martinez as "Chewey"
- Juan Carlos Hernández as Franky
- Nestor Serrano as Victor
- Coati Mundi as Old Man
- David Zayas as Paulie
- Guillermo Díaz as Manny (credited as Guillermo Diaz)
- Omar Benson Miller as Mack
- Vanessa Ferlito as Lizette Sanchez
- Robert Montano as Resto
- Robert Forster as Scott Green
- Kim Matulova as Alva
- Will Arnett as Scott Green's Assistant
- Kamar de los Reyes as Jose Beveagua
- Larry Merchant as Himself
- Jim Lampley as Himself
- Mike Francesa as Mike and the Mad Dog (credited as Michael Francesa)
- Christopher "Mad Dog" Russo as Mike and the Mad Dog (credited as Christopher Russo)
- Tony Touch as D.J.
