= MTV Party to Go 8 =

MTV Party To Go Volume 8

Compilation album by Various artists
- Released: November 21, 1995
- Genre: Dance
- Length: 47:06
- Label: Tommy Boy Records

Various artists chronology
MTV Party to Go 7 (1995)	MTV Party To Go Volume 8 (1995)	MTV Party to Go 9 (1996)

Professional ratings
Review scores
Source	Rating
Allmusic	4/5 stars

MTV Party To Go Volume 8 was the eighth album in MTV's Party To Go series. The album was certified gold on February 23, 1996, by the RIAA.

== Track listing ==
1. "Big Poppa" (Original Version) – The Notorious B.I.G.
2. "Feel Me Flow" (Original Mix) – Naughty by Nature
3. "If You Love Me" (LP Version) – Brownstone
4. "I'll Be There for You/You're All I Need to Get By" (Puff Daddy Mix) – Method Man and Mary J. Blige
5. "I Wish" (LP Version) – Skee-Lo
6. "Can't Cry Anymore" (LP Version) – Sheryl Crow
7. "Rhythm of the Night" (R.X.B. Euro Mix) – Corona
8. "Bounce It Y'All" (Original Mix) – DJ Kizzy Rock
9. "1st of tha Month" (LP Version) – Bone Thugs-N-Harmony
10. "Gangsta's Paradise" (LP Version) – Coolio featuring L.V.
11. "Boombastic" (Sting Remix) – Shaggy

== Charts ==
=== Weekly charts ===
Chart (1996)	Peak position
US Billboard 200	47

=== Year-end charts ===
Chart (1996)	Position
US Billboard 200	121
