= Svetlana Lloyd =

Christian Dior model

- Born: Egypt
- Education: Legat School of Ballet
- Occupations: Ballet dancer, model, journalist
- Known for: Modelling the Trapeze line dress

Svetlana E. Lloyd (née Kassessinova/Kassessinoff) is an Egyptian-born former house model, then known as a "mannequin", for the Dior fashion house in Paris during the 1950s, under designers Christian Dior and Yves Saint Laurent. She became known as the "Trapèze Line girl" after wearing Saint Laurent's Trapeze dress at a fashion show in 1958 and appearing on magazine covers around the world.

After retiring from modeling, Lloyd worked as a journalist and lecturer.

== Early life ==
She was born Svetlana Kassessinova or Kassessinoff in Egypt to Russian parents who had left Russia because of the revolution. Her father worked as a miniaturist and painter for King Farouk and her mother was a seamstress.

== Ballet dancer ==
She was sent to Legat's School of Ballet in Tunbridge Wells, England, run by Nadine Legat (wife of Nikolai Legat), and trained there as a ballet dancer. She joined the Sadler's Wells Ballet, and whilst on a tour of A Midsummer Night's Dream in the United States, injured her knee ice skating, forcing her to give up ballet. Another account states that she had to stop ballet as she had grown too tall.

== Model for Dior ==
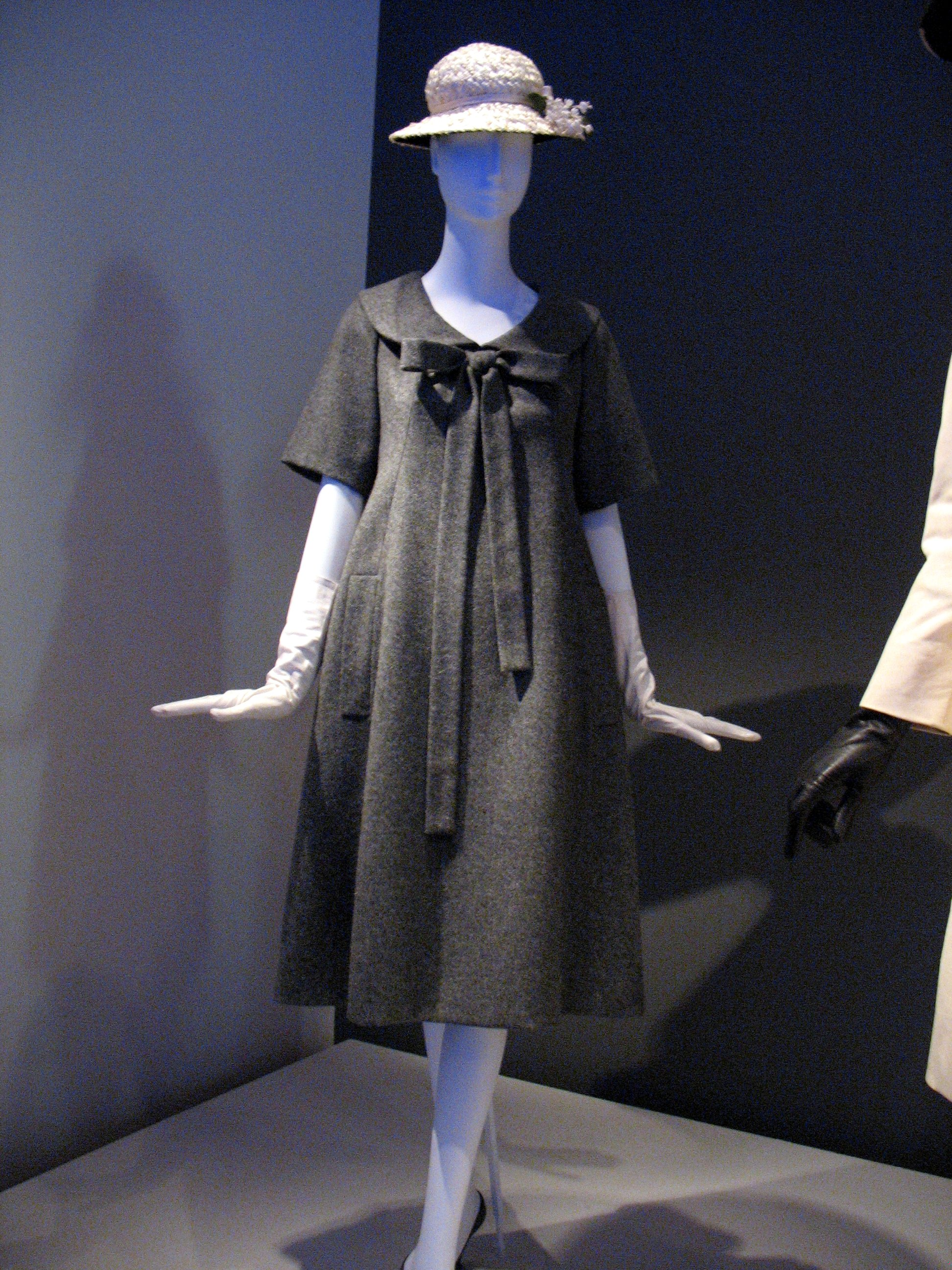
Trapèze line dress, first worn by Lloyd

Aged 20, and as she spoke French, she went to Paris to try to get a receptionist job, entered a Dior boutique to ask about positions, and was shown upstairs by an assistant to try on a dress after which Christian Dior gave her a job as a house model or "mannequin". She started work the next day. She later remembered that she didn't know how to walk as a model but she did know how to move due to her training as a dancer.

She was the first to model Saint Laurent's new Trapèze line dress, becoming the "Trapèze Line girl" after wearing the dress in Dior's January 1958 fashion show when the new silhouette, "growing from the bust" was first revealed. She subsequently featured on the cover of magazines around the world. The dress, that Lloyd later observed was more significant for its shape than its grey wool material, is now in New York's Metropolitan Museum. She worked regularly for Dior and remembered him for kindness and being more concerned with elegance than beauty.

After Dior's death she joined the other models in occupying the front two rows of the church for the funeral. They all wore black haute couture coats.

== Later life ==
After two seasons with Christian Dior and two collections with Yves Saint Laurent, she set sail for the United States, where she met her first husband, the American investment banker Roger H. Lloyd. They married in South Kensington, London, in 1959, and spent four years in New York, where they had two children, Alexander and Marina. She now lives in South Kensington, London, with her current husband.

Lloyd worked as an assistant editor for Mademoiselle magazine for 50 years but it took her decades to get used to wearing ill-fitting ready-to-wear clothes rather than haute couture garments that were made to fit. She later took up samba dancing, winning a silver medal as an amateur. In 2004, she sold two "tight and painful" corsets at Christie's that she wore at Dior, receiving £300 for them, despite observing that they had not been washed since 1956.
