= MTV Party to Go 4 =

MTV Party To Go Volume 4

Compilation album by Various artists
- Released: June 22, 1993
- Genre: Dance
- Length: 52:04
- Label: Tommy Boy Records

Various artists chronology
MTV Party to Go 3 (1993)	MTV Party To Go Volume 4 (1993)	MTV Party to Go 5 (1994)

Professional ratings
Review scores
Source	Rating
Allmusic	3/5 stars
Spin Alternative Record Guide	8/10

MTV Party To Go volume 4 was the fourth album in the MTV Party To Go series. The album was certified gold on May 25, 1994, by the RIAA.

== Track listing ==
1. "Give It Away" (12″ Mix) – Red Hot Chili Peppers
2. "Baby-Baby-Baby" (Full Length Mix) – TLC
3. "My Lovin' (You're Never Gonna Get It)" (Theo's Cheaptrick Mix) – En Vogue
4. "Hip Hop Hooray" (Extended Mix) – Naughty by Nature
5. "They Want EFX" (Remix) – Das EFX
6. "Back to the Hotel" (Radio Remix) – N2Deep
7. "Jump" (Supercat Mix) – Kris Kross
8. "Rhythm Is a Dancer" (Purple Haze Mix) – Snap!
9. "Supermodel (You Better Work)" (Couture Mix) – RuPaul
10. "Please Don’t Go" (Sunshine Mix) – KWS
