= MTV Party to Go 3 =

MTV Party To Go Volume 3

Compilation album by Various artists
- Released: June 22, 1993
- Genre: Dance
- Length: 54:16
- Label: Tommy Boy

Various artists chronology
MTV Party to Go 2 (1992)	MTV Party To Go Volume 3 (1993)	MTV Party to Go 4 (1993)

Professional ratings
Review scores
Source	Rating
AllMusic	3/5 stars
Spin Alternative Record Guide	6/10

MTV Party to Go Volume 3 was the third album in the MTV Party to Go series. The album was certified Gold on December 6, 1993, by the RIAA.

== Track listing ==
1. "Baby Got Back" (Album Version) – Sir Mix-a-Lot
2. "Finally" (12" Choice Mix) – CeCe Peniston
3. "Deeper and Deeper" (David's Klub Mix) – Madonna
4. "I'm Too Sexy" (Extended Club Mix) – Right Said Fred
5. "Real Love" (Hip Hop Mix) – Mary J. Blige
6. "Jump Around" (Blood Stain Remix) – House of Pain
7. "I Got a Man" (Ultimix Remix) – Positive K
8. "Come & Talk To Me" (Radio Remix) – Jodeci
9. "Mr. Loverman" (D.M. Ragga Hop Mix) – Shabba Ranks
10. "End of the Road" (LP Version) – Boyz II Men
