= Lucky Boys Confusion =

American rock band

- Origin: Downers Grove & Naperville Illinois, United States
- Genres: Punk rock, ska, hip hop, pop punk
- Years active: 1997–present
- Labels: Elektra Records; Townstyle Music
- Spinoffs: Shock Stars
- Spinoff of: AM Taxi
- Members: Kaustubh “Stubhy” Pandav; Adam Krier; Jason Schultejann; Ryan Fergus
- Past members: Joe Sell (deceased)

Lucky Boys Confusion is an American rock band from the western suburbs of Chicago, Illinois, United States. Hailing from DuPage County, the band's music is a mix of rock, punk, ska and hip hop. The band consists of vocalist Kaustubh "Stubhy" Pandav, guitarist/vocalist Adam Krier, bassist Jason Schultejann, and drummer Ryan Fergus. Guitarist and founding member Joe Sell (October 16, 1978 – May 15, 2012) was a member of the band until his death. Pandav and Krier write the majority of the band's songs.

== History ==
=== Beginnings as an independent band ===
Lucky Boys Confusion formed in 1997 shortly after the breakups of Pandav and Fergus's band, Farmboy, and Krier and Sell's band, Spinning Jenny. After recruiting Schultejann on bass, the group quickly released an EP, What Gets Me High. In late 1998 they released their name first full-length album, Growing Out of It, under their own label, Townstyle Records. The album contained the song "Dumb Pop Song", which had gained airplay on Chicago alternative rock station Q101. In 2000, the band released The Soapbox Spectacle, featuring a new version of "Fred Astaire", and five new songs. During this time, the band recorded a video for "Dumb Pop Song".

=== Elektra Records, mainstream success ===
In 2000, the band signed a major-label deal with Elektra Records. They headed to California in the fall of that year to begin recording the album Throwing the Game, which was released on May 8, 2001. It featured new versions of songs from their first two releases and several new songs, including a cover of Jocelyn Enriquez's "Do You Miss Me?". The band also released a video for the song "Bossman" featuring Beenie Man. In 2008, "Bossman" was featured in a commercial for the gum Extra.

Their second effort for Elektra Records, Commitment, proved to be their most popular record. Michael Miguel Happoldt produced the album, which contained fifteen new songs that shifted from ska or hip hop influences to pop rock influences. The band recorded a video for "Hey Driver", and the song was featured in the movies Looney Tunes: Back in Action, Without a Paddle, and New York Minute, and the video game MVP Baseball 2004.

=== Hiatus ===
In 2004, the band was dropped by Elektra Records. After mockingly referring to the company as "Neglektra", the band members were happy to have a fresh start. In August 2005, the band independently released The Red Tape Outtakes (Demos And Heartbreaks), a 12-song collection of unreleased tracks and outtakes.

The band released How to Get Out Alive on June 13, 2006. It contained four new songs and a cover of Dramarama's "Anything, Anything".

On September 20, 2006, the band announced via its Myspace page that they were going on hiatus and quelled rumors of a breakup in a message the following day that it was only a "short break" and that fans shouldn't worry. At their final show before the hiatus in Iowa City, Iowa, the band assured concertgoers that their annual 'Songs from a Scene' concerts would go on in December at the Metro in Chicago after they returned to a sense of "normality" over the next few months.

On December 29, 2006, at Songs from a Scene, the band released Live and Acoustic (Recorded at the Beat Kitchen). It is the band's first live album.

=== Side projects ===
In late 2006, Pandav, along with Chicago DJ's JJ Flores and Steve Smooth, recorded an EP under the name Shock Stars. The album was released on March 6, 2007, in CD and digital formats. Shock Stars played their first live show at Double Door. Shock Stars broke up in 2009.

In May 2007, Krier, Schultejann, and drummer Chris Smith of 15 Minutes Late and Logan Square, formed a side project, American Taxi. Their first single, "The Mistake", was released on Memorial Day 2007 on their Myspace page. American Taxi has since released an EP entitled Runaway Songs, containing "The Mistake" and five other tracks.

In 2008, Pandav, along with Ramzi Hassan, Chris Orebaugh, Brian Sherman, Dan-O Borgo, and Mike Ford would get together to form the band "The Insecurites" who would release 2 EPs, "Ban The Kiss Hello" and "Show Your Teeth" (Sometimes stylized as "SHOW YOUR TEETH")

In April 2009, American Taxi was signed to Virgin Records and changed its name to AM Taxi to differentiate from bluegrass group Great American Taxi.

In June 2009, Pandav recorded vocals for local Chicago rappers Saurus and Bones on the song "What's It Gonna Take?" from their debut album Mind Like Mine.

In the summer of 2010, Pandav formed a band, The Super Happy Fun Club, with Pat Gilroy, Jeremy Galanes, and Chris Mason of Close Enough, Onelife, and The Waiting Game, Brad Chagdes of 15 Minutes Late and Logan Square, and Phil Kosch of Treaty of Paris. Their first EP, Go Fun Yourself, was released June 2011.

=== Closing Arguments ===
In December 2008 at Songs from a Scene, Lucky Boys Confusion announced that they would be releasing a new album in 2009. The new album, Closing Arguments, contains old demos and rare songs as well as a new song, "This Town Ain't Big Enough for Both of Us". It was released without advance promotion to digital retailers. Closing Arguments was released physically on June 23, 2009.

=== End of Songs from a Scene ===
On December 26, 2009, Pandav announced that the Songs from a Scene would end with the 2010 performances.

=== Death of Joe Sell ===
Sell was found dead in Chicago on May 15, 2012, at 33. He had been in the hospital with pancreas problems prior to his death. It was later revealed that drug paraphernalia was found near his body and the cause of death was believed to be a drug overdose.

=== Current work ===
The band plays shows in and around Chicago. In April 2016, Pandav, Krier, and Schultejann confirmed that a new album was in the works. The band's Twitter confirmed in early December that the album would be released in the Spring of 2017, and on January 1, 2017, announced that the album would be named STORMCHASERS. On January 23, the band announced that Stormchasers would be released on April 11, 2017. Pandav sang backup vocals on a cover by Chicago rock band OUTDrejas of Dayman from It's Always Sunny in Philadelphia, which was released on February 1, 2019.

== Discography ==
- What Gets Me High EP (1997?)
- Growing Out of It (1998, Townstyle Records)
- The Soapbox Spectacle EP (2000, Townstyle Records)
- Throwing the Game (2001, Elektra Records)
- LBC Geeks (2002, Townstyle Records)
- Commitment (2003, Elektra Records)
- The Red Tape Outtakes (Demos And Heartbreaks) (2005, Townstyle Records)
- How to Get Out Alive EP (2006, Townstyle Records)
- Live and Acoustic (Recorded at the Beat Kitchen) (2007, Townstyle Records)
- Closing Arguments (2009, Townstyle Records)
- STORMCHASERS (2017, Townstyle Records)
