= Hedonism (disambiguation) =

Hedonism concerns any philosophy or value system which considers the pursuit of pleasure to be of great importance.

Hedonism may also refer to:

- Psychological hedonism, the view that the ultimate motive for all voluntary human action is the desire to experience pleasure or to avoid pain
- Christian hedonism, a controversial Christian doctrine
- The paradox of hedonism, the idea that pleasure does not obey normal principles
- Hedonic psychology, also known as happiness economics
- Hedonism Resorts, vacation resorts in Jamaica
- Hedonism (single), a single by Skunk Anansie
- Hedonism (album), an album by Bellowhead
- "Hedonism (Just Because You Feel Good)", a song by Skunk Anansie
- Hedonismbot, a minor character in the animated sitcom Futurama
- Hedonic regression, a method of estimating demand or value

== See also ==
- Egoism
- Hedonist (disambiguation)
