= The Red Tape Outtakes (Demos and Heartbreaks) =

The Red Tape Outtakes (Demos And Heartbreaks)

Compilation album by Lucky Boys Confusion
- Released: August 2005
- Genre: Punk/Ska
- Length: 36:34
- Label: Townstyle Records
- Producer: Adam Krier, Ryan Fergus, Rizzo

Lucky Boys Confusion chronology
| Commitment (2003) | The Red Tape Outtakes (Demos And Heartbreaks) (2005) | How to Get Out Alive (2006) |

The Red Tape Outtakes (Demos And Heartbreaks), released August 2005, is a compilation album and the fifth release from the rock band Lucky Boys Confusion.

== Track listing ==
1. "Straight from the Top" - 2:41
2. "Love You from the Top" - 3:17
3. "Drugs (We're Alright)" - 1:42
4. "Rolling Rock" - 3:23
5. "Evidence" - 2:26
6. "Hardest Part" - 2:55
7. "City to City" - 3:28
8. "One More Chance" - 1:38
9. "Hey" - 2:25
10. "Needle in My Arm" - 2:54
11. "Le Chanson du Soldat" - 5:07
12. "The Power (live)" - 4:37
