= Classified Records =

US independent record label

Classified Records was an independent record label based in San Francisco, California, that released music by Jocelyn Enriquez, Pinay, Julie Plug, M:G, Drop 'n Harmony, as well as the Serenade compilation series. Founded by Kormann Roque, Noel Laxamana, Rino Que, and Elvin Reyes in 1993, the label was well known within the Filipino community since many staff members and recording artists were of Filipino descent.

== History ==
Classified Records' first release was the debut album by Jocelyn Enriquez, who became popular with her hit records "I've Been Thinking About You", "Do You Miss Me?", and "A Lil' Bit of Ecstasy" produced by Glenn Gutierrez. The label's other notable singles included "Is It Real" by Pinay along with "Sweet Honesty" and "What Do You Remember" by M:G, which also charted on Billboard magazine. R&B male group Drop N Harmony and alternative band Julie Plug rounded out their roster. Plug remains a legendary staple in the San Francisco indie band scene. Classified released three slow jam CDs called "Serenade" that featured slow jams by Filipino American artists across the globe that garnered a strong following from its Filipino American fanbase.

After a brief joint venture with Tommy Boy Records, the original Classified Records closed its doors in 2001 with a few Classified executives and producers starting their own indie labels. Producer/songwriters JP Nebres, Matt Villacarte, and Glenn Gutierrez partnered to form Planet Hype, releasing music by singer-songwriter Sharyn Maceren, Pinay, Ace High (a hip-hop trio that included Traxamillion), and Drop 'n Harmony (DnH). Planet Hype also provides mixing, mastering and production services as well as serving as a digital distribution solution for a number of independent artists, including American Idol contestants Todrick Hall, Charity Vance, and Sway Penala. Former Classified Records executive Reno Ursal started his own label, Rhythm Drive Records, releasing music by Malyssa and Alvendia. Ursal's Young Adult novel "Enlightenment" Book 1 of The Bathala Series was released in 2019 winning multiple literary awards.

In 2006, CJ Harris purchased the license to the name "Classified Records." The new incarnation of Classified Records is based in San Diego, California.
