= MTV Party to Go 1 =

Club MTV Party to Go Volume One

Compilation album by Various artists
- Released: May 8, 1991
- Genre: Dance
- Label: Tommy Boy Records

Club MTV Party to Go chronology
Club MTV Party to Go Volume One (1991)	MTV Party to Go 2 (1992)

Professional ratings
Review scores
Source	Rating
Allmusic	link
Spin Alternative Record Guide	4/10

Club MTV Party to Go Volume One was the first album in the MTV Party to Go series. The album was certified Gold on May 25, 1994, by the RIAA.

== Track listing ==
1. At the club (Club MTV Theme)
2. Turn This Mutha Out – MC Hammer
3. Poison – Bell Biv DeVoe
4. Feels Good – Tony! Toni! Toné!
5. Knocked Out – Paula Abdul
6. Think – Information Society
7. Play That Funky Music – Vanilla Ice
8. Tom's Diner – DNA featuring Suzanne Vega
9. Knockin' Boots – Candyman
10. The Humpty Dance – Digital Underground
11. Don't Wanna Fall in Love – Jane Child
12. Personal Jesus – Depeche Mode
