= Ghetto Bootleg =

Album by FannyPack

Compilation album by FannyPack
- Released: 2008
- Genre: Miami bass; hip hop
- Label: Tommy Boy Entertainment
- Producer: Matt Goias and Fancy

FannyPack chronology
See You Next Tuesday (2005)	Ghetto Bootleg (2008)

Professional ratings
Review scores
Source	Rating
About.com	2.5/5 stars
Allmusic	2.5/5 stars

Ghetto Bootleg was a set of unreleased tracks and remixes that FannyPack released on its Web site in 2005. There were originally only 1,000 copies available, but, in 2008, Tommy Boy Entertainment officially released the album.

== Track listing ==
All tracks are written by Goias, Grady; except where noted.

No.	Title	Writer(s)	Length
1.	"Hit It"		3:00
2.	"Yo!"		2:58
3.	"The Theme from Frank"		4:08
4.	"Cameltoe" (Old School Remix)		3:42
5.	"Hard Beat"		1:32
6.	"Pop That Thing"		2:28
7.	"Hit It Again"	Goias, Grady, Lugo	3:25
8.	"Booty Cologne"	Goias, Jacobsen, Kristiansen, Saugmann, Sjellberg	3:53
9.	"Baby"		4:06
10.	"The Pause"		4:56
11.	"So Stylistic" (Turntablerocker Remix)		3:09
12.	"Hey, Mami" (Sharaz Mix)	Goias, Grady, Suthiwong	3:33
13.	"Nu Nu (Yeah Yeah)" (Double J & Haze Remix)	Fingers, Hula, Townsell	3:29
14.	"Nu Nu (Yeah Yeah)" (Friscia & Lamboy Club Mix)	Fingers, Hula, Townsell
