= MTV Party to Go Remixed =

Compilation album by Various artists
- Released: April 10, 2001
- Genres: Dance, pop
- Length: 66:06
- Label: Tommy Boy Records

Various artists chronology
MTV Party to Go 2000 (1999)	MTV Party to Go Remixed (2001)

MTV Party to Go Remixed was the fifteenth and final album in the MTV Party to Go series.

== Track listing ==
1. Daylight (Tony Moran Remix) - New Life Crisis
2. Show Me the Meaning of Being Lonely (Soul Solution Remix) - Backstreet Boys
3. Get It On Tonite (Jonathan Peters Club Mix) - Montell Jordan
4. Back at One (Groove Brothers Club Mix) - Brian McKnight
5. There You Go (Hani Num Club) - Pink
6. Party Up (Up in Here) (Jonathan Peters Club Mix) - DMX
7. Papa's Got a Brand New Pigbag (Thunderpuss Club Mix) - Thunderpuss
8. It Feels So Good (Sonique's Breakbeat Mix) - Sonique
9. The Bad Touch (Eiffel 65 Remix) - Bloodhound Gang
10. Shackles (Praise You) (Victor Calderone Big Room Mix) - Mary Mary
11. Love One Another (Rosabel Anthem Mix) - Amber
12. By Your Side (Original Mix) - Malina
13. All Good? (Ugo & Sanz Chaka's Affair Remix) - De La Soul featuring Chaka Khan
14. (I Wonder Why) He's the Greatest DJ (Masters At Work Vocal Mix) - Tony Touch featuring Keisha & Pam of Total
15. I Wanna Know (Pound Boys Remix) - Joe
