= Mademoiselle (magazine) =

Women's fashion magazine (1935–2001)

- February 1954 cover
- Categories: Women's magazine
- First issue: 1935
- Final issue: 2001
- Company: Street & Smith; Condé Nast Publications
- Country: United States
- Based in: New York City
- Language: English
- Website: web.archive.org/*/https://www.mademoiselle.com/
- ISSN: 0024-9394

Mademoiselle was a women's magazine first published in 1935 by Street & Smith and later acquired by Condé Nast Publications.

Mademoiselle, primarily a fashion magazine, was also known for publishing short stories by popular authors including Truman Capote, Ray Bradbury, Joyce Carol Oates, William Faulkner, Tennessee Williams, James Baldwin, Flannery O'Connor, Sylvia Plath, Paul Bowles, Jane Bowles, Jane Smiley, Mary Gordon, Paul Theroux, Sue Miller, Barbara Kingsolver, Perri Klass, Michael Chabon, Mona Simpson, Alice Munro, Harold Brodkey, Pam Houston, Jean Stafford, and Susan Minot. Julia Cameron was a frequent columnist. The art director was Barbara Kruger, then it was Cipe Pineles who became it from 1961.

In 1952, Sylvia Plath's short story "Sunday at the Mintons" won first prize and $500, as well as publication in the magazine. Her experiences during the summer of 1953 as a guest editor at Mademoiselle provided the basis for her novel, The Bell Jar.

The August 1961 "college issue" of Mademoiselle included a photo of UCLA senior class president Willette Murphy, who did not realize she was making history as the first African-American model to appear in a mainstream fashion magazine.

During an interview with Fashion Week Online, Fern Mallis mentioned that she was one of 20 winners of the guest editing competition that she entered while attending college. She stated that she "was the only one of the 20 asked to come back and get a full-time job with the magazine." Mallis attributed that her publishing career began at Mademoiselle. The New York Social Diary stated that she “worked at the magazine for six years.”

In the sixties, Mademoiselle was geared toward "the smart young woman". It categorically stated in its editorials that despite the young, maidenly name, it was not geared toward young teenagers. The majority of readers may have been in college or in a job, and some may have been married. Mademoiselle was interested in reaching mature college freshmen and up who were being exposed to the greatest literature and facing the greatest moral problems coping with all the complexities of the atomic age.

Mademoiselle continued throughout the eighties and nineties featuring the top models on its covers and in the pages of the editorial sections.

In 1993, Elizabeth Crow was appointed editor-in-chief. The November 2001 magazine was the final issue. Some of the 93 employees and features moved over to Glamour, also published by Condé Nast. The magazine's demise was due to multiple factors, including an editorial inability to update the magazine to appeal to a sufficient audience and an overall decline in advertising revenues across the magazine industry.

== Editors ==
- Desmond Hall and F. Orlin Tremaine (1935)
- F. Orlin Tremaine (1935–1937)
- Betsy Blackwell (1937–1971)
- Edie Locke (1971–1980)
- Amy Levin Cooper (1981–1992)
- Gabe Doppelt (1992)
- Elizabeth Crow (1993–2000)
- Mandi Norwood (2000–2001)

== Notable people ==
- Barbara Birdfeather, wrote the astrology column for several years
- Svetlana Lloyd, assistant editor for 50 years.
- Carol Spencer, fashion designer for the Barbie doll.
