= MTV Party to Go 1999 =

MTV Party To Go ‘99

Compilation album by Various artists
- Released: November 24, 1998
- Genre: hip hop, Dance, pop
- Label: Tommy Boy Records

Various artists chronology
MTV Party to Go 1998 (1997)	MTV Party To Go ‘99 (1998)	MTV Party to Go 2000 (1999)

Professional ratings
Review scores
Source	Rating
Allmusic	4/5 stars

MTV Party To Go ‘99 was the thirteenth album in the MTV Party To Go series. The album was certified gold on February 24, 1999, by the RIAA.

== Track listing ==
1. "No, No, No Part 2" – Destiny's Child featuring Wyclef Jean
2. "Still Not a Player" – Big Punisher featuring Joe
3. "Superthug" – Noreaga
4. "Put Your Hands Where My Eyes Could See" – Busta Rhymes
5. "Deja Vu (Uptown Baby)" – Lord Tariq & Peter Gunz
6. "Make 'Em Say Uhh!" – Master P., Fiend, The Shocker, Mia X, Mystikal
7. "The Rain (Supa Dupa Fly)" – Missy "Misdemeanor" Elliott
8. "Show Me Love" – Robyn
9. "Shorty (You Keep Playin' with My Mind)" – Imajin featuring Keith Murray
10. "Fly" – Sugar Ray
11. "As Long As You Love Me" – Backstreet Boys
12. "My Heart Will Go On" – Deja Vu
13. "Let's Ride" – Montell Jordan featuring Master P. & Silkk "The Shocker"
14. "Butta Love" – Next
