= AM Taxi =

American rock band (2007–present)

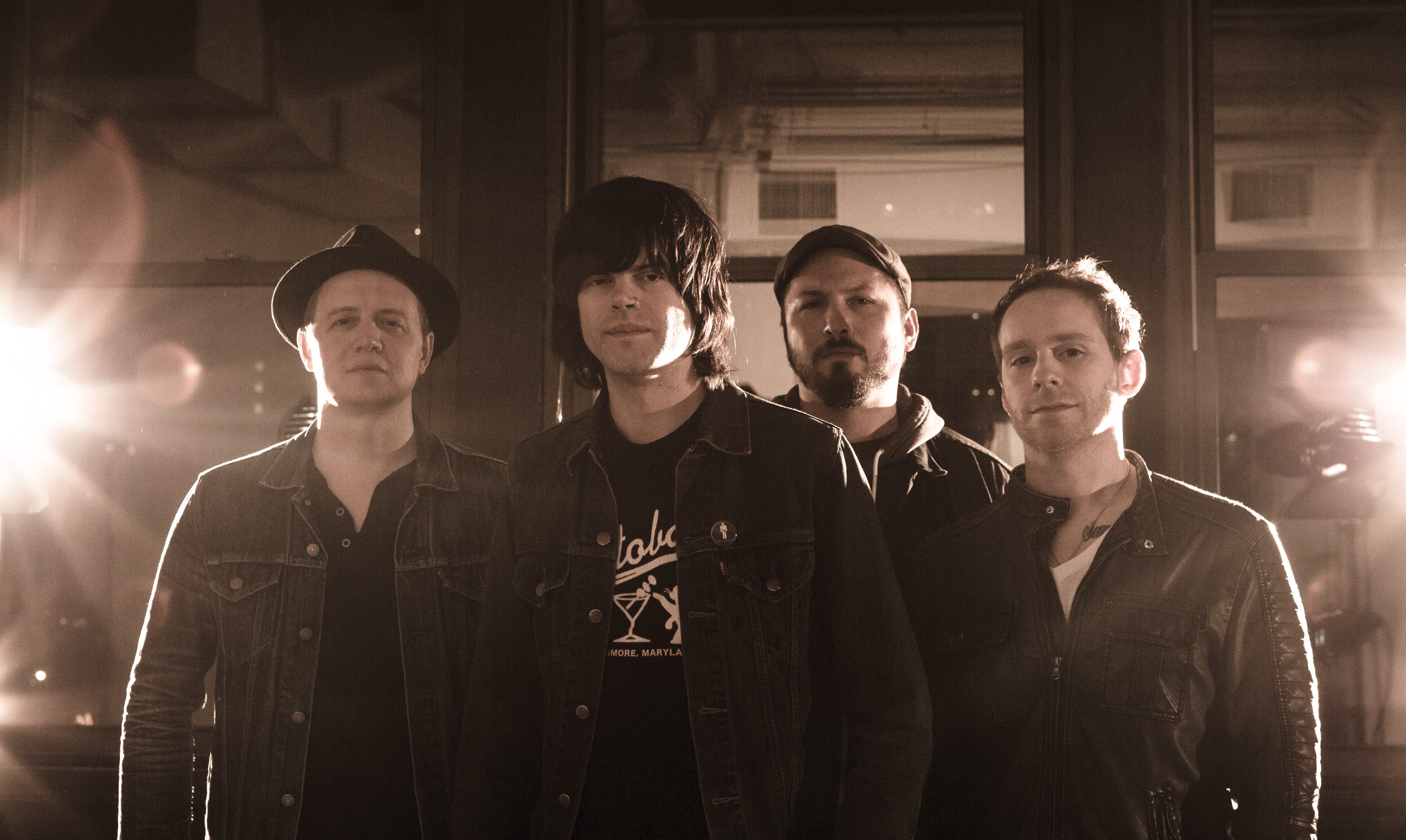
- AM Taxi

Background information
- Origin: Naperville, Illinois, U.S.
- Genres: Alternative rock, punk rock
- Years active: 2007–present
- Labels: Virgin Records; Mutant League Records
- Spinoff of: Lucky Boys Confusion
- Members: Adam Krier; Jason Schultejann; Jay Marino; Chris Smith
- Past members: John Schmitt & Luke Schmitt
- Website: www.amtaximusic.com

AM Taxi (formerly known as American Taxi) is an American rock band from Chicago, Illinois, United States. The band was formed by Adam Krier, Chris Smith, and Jason Schultejann in 2007. After building a base in Chicago, AM Taxi was included on multiple US tours including Vans Warped Tour.

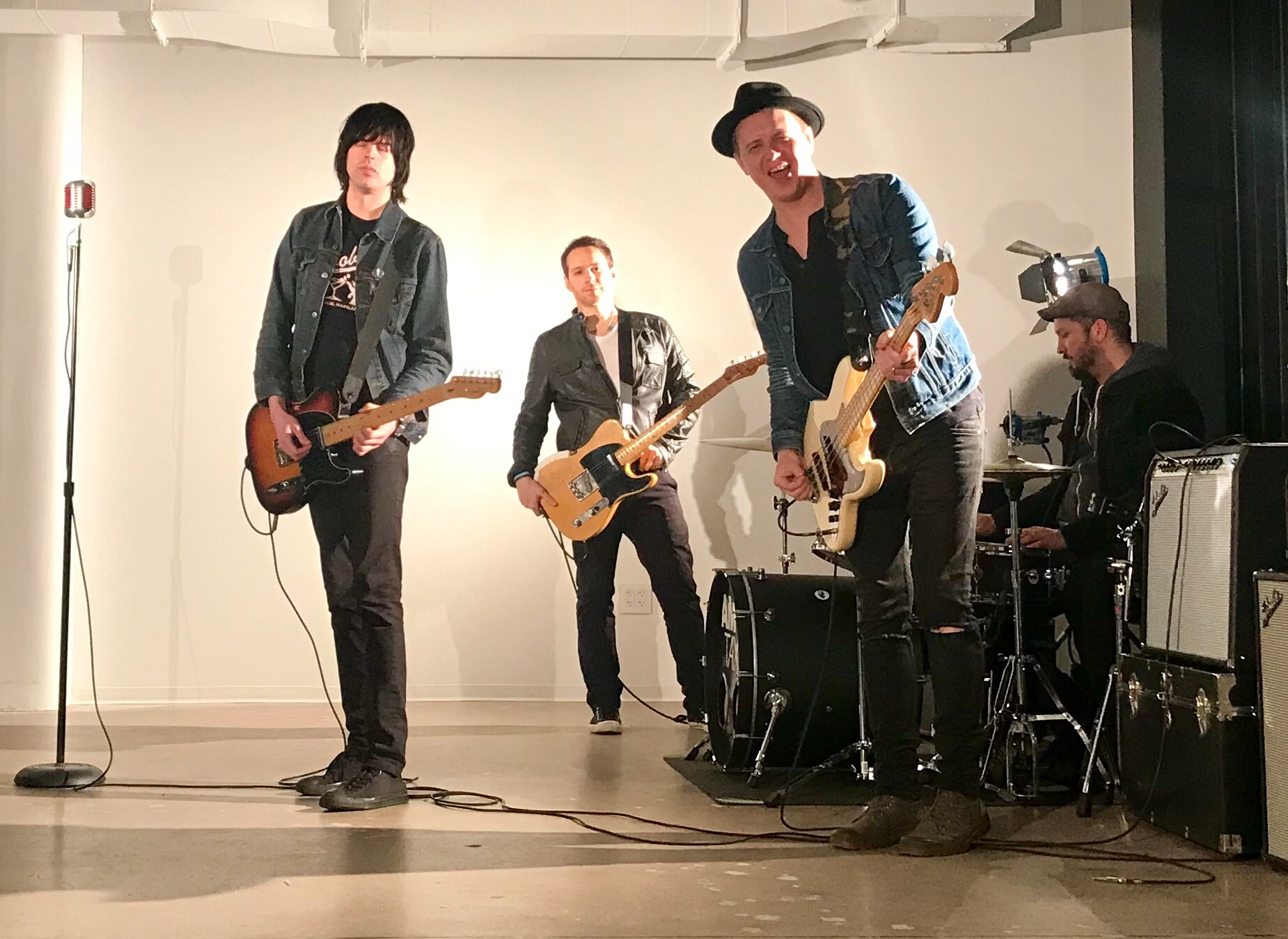
AM Taxi at a video shoot 2018 in Chicago

== Band members ==
- Adam Krier – vocals, guitar
- Jason Schultejann – bass
- Chris Smith – drums, backing vocals
- Jay Marino – guitar, backing vocals, mandolin

== History ==
AM Taxi was originally known as American Taxi but changed to AM Taxi because their original name was too similar to the bluegrass group, Great American Taxi. The band was started in May 2007 by Adam Krier and Jason Schultejann of Lucky Boys Confusion and Chris Smith (Logan Square/15 Minutes Late). The trio wrote and recorded their first EP, Runaway Songs. Shortly thereafter, John and Luke Schmitt joined the band.

AM Taxi was signed by Virgin Records in April 2009. They produced their first LP, We Don't Stand A Chance, with producer Mike McCarthy in Austin. The album was released on June 9, 2010.

In March 2011 the group split ways with Virgin Records.

In early April 2011, Johnny Schmitt, AKA Johnny Don't!, parted ways from the band to pursue other musical interests.

Shortly after in early 2012 Jay Marino (Ww Lowman, Miracle Condition, Buddy Nuisance) joined on guitar.

Between 2013 and 2014, AM Taxi released back to back EPs, King of the Pond and Bastards of the Deep Blue Sea

In early 2014 Luke Schmitt parted ways from the band.

In 2016 the Semi-Confessional mixtape was released initially only on cassette, but is now also available digitally. It is a collection of past EP releases, alternative versions, demos, unreleased material, and collaborations.

AM Taxi released the album Shiver by Me on January 25, 2019.^{[1]}

== Discography ==
=== Runaway Songs (EP) ===
- The Mistake (Burning Hot Girls)
- Dead Street
- Tanner Boyle Vs. The 7th Grade
- Shake Rattle and Stall
- Paper Covers Rock
- Maps And Medicine

=== The Good, The Bad and the Fed Up (EP) ===
- Fed Up
- Charissa
- The Mistake (Acoustic)
- Champagne Toast
- Girl Song (Flea Circus)

=== We Don't Stand A Chance ===
- Dead Street
- The Mistake
- Fed Up
- Charissa
- Tanner Boyle Vs. The 7th Grade
- Paper Covers Rock
- Maydays and Rosaries
- Shake, Rattle and Stall
- Reckless Ways
- Woodpecker
- Champagne Toast

=== King of The Pond (EP) ===
- Central Standard TIme
- It's Only DuPage Wasteland
- Chelsea
- Sorry You're Sick

=== Bastard of Deep Blue Sea (EP) ===
- I Don't Like Your Neighborhood
- Reckless in the Moonlight
- Frostbit
- Seams

=== Semi-Confessional (Mixtape) ===
- Reckless in the Moonlight (feat. Genevieve)
- Enough to Feel Like Enough
- Stone Cold Virgo (feat. Michael Miguel Happoldt)
- Lets Continue to Dig
- Epilogues (home demo)
- Shake, Rattle, and Stall (acoustic)
- Bored and Raised
- Out on the Fire Escape
- Cant Talk My Way Into You
- It's Only Dupage Wasteland

=== Shiver by Me ===
- Saint Jane
- Harpoon
- Movie About Your Life
- Swim Before You Sink (Short Time on Earth)
- Fighting in Cars
- L' patron
- Stuck Around
- Brandy Don't Let Me Down
- Minute Alone
- Shaken Over You
- Warsaw Blues
