= Missbehave =

American women's magazine

- Missbehave, Winter 2007–2008
- Founding Editor: Mary H.K. Choi (Issues 1–9)
- Editor-in-Chief: Lesley Arfin (Issues 10–11)
- Frequency: Quarterly
- Publisher: Adrian Moeller
- First issue: 2006
- Final issue Number: 2009; 11
- Company: Mass Appeal Publishing
- Country: United States
- Language: English
- Website: Missbehave official website

Missbehave was a Brooklyn-based women's magazine that was produced from 2006 until March 2009. It covered fashion, music, art and pop culture. Columnists included Kelis, Matt Goias, Sarah Morrison and Lesley Arfin and regularly featured models Kim Matulova, Victoria Brito, Joli Robinson and Brissi.

Several examples of Missbehave cover stars were:

- Katy Perry (Issue #11 – Spring 2009)
- Chloë Sevigny (Issue #10 – Winter 2008–2009)
- Santigold (Issue #9 – Fall 2008)
- Barbara Fialho (Issue #8 – Summer 2008)
- Amber Heard (Issue #7 – Spring 2008)
- Lydia Hearst (Issue #6 – Winter 2007–2008)
- M.I.A. (Issue #5 – Fall 2007)
- Mena Suvari (Issue #4 – Summer 2007)
- Bijou Phillips (Issue #3 – Spring 2007)
- Lily Allen (Issue #2 – Winter 2006–2007)
- Nelly Furtado (Issue #1 – Fall 2006)

== Staff ==
- Founder: Samantha Moeller
- Editor-In-Chief for issues 1–9: Mary H.K. Choi
- Editor-In-Chief issues 10–11: Lesley Arfin
- Creative Director: Sally Thurer
- Director of Photography: Brooke Nipar
- West Coast Editor: Yasi Salek
- Senior Editor: Olivia Allin
- Features Fashion Editor: Allison Miller
- Market Editor: Rose Garcia
- Online Editor: Sarah Morrison
- Special Projects Coordinator: Emilia Perez
- Type Consultant: Jeremy Pettis
- Publisher: Adrian Moeller
- Interns: Bridget Dean, Stefanie Arroyo, Christine Mayrina, Olivia Kirsch, Alex Harrington, Meghan Calabro, Annie Krasner and Meg Prossnitz
