= Carrie Borzillo =

American journalist

- Borzillo in 2002
- Born: June 20, 1970 (age 55); Wallingford, Connecticut, U.S.
- Occupations: Writer, journalist
- Website: carrieborzillo.com

Carrie Borzillo (formerly Carrie Borzillo-Vrenna; born June 20, 1970) is an American music and entertainment journalist and author of three books on aspects of the entertainment industry and of one advice book.

== Journalist ==
Borzillo has dispensed love and sex advice as "Dr. Love" throughout the run of rock musician Gene Simmons' short-lived glossy monthly, Tongue, and has written the sex/love advice column "Miss Truth Hurts" for SuicideGirls.com.

== Bibliography ==
- Cherry Bomb, ISBN 978-1-4169-6116-1
- Eyewitness Nirvana: The Day-by-Day Chronicle, author
- Nirvana: The Day-to-Day Illustrated Journals, author
- Kurt Cobain: The Nirvana Years, ISBN 978-1-84442-962-2
- Nobody Likes You: Inside the Turbulent Life, Times and Music of Green Day, contributor (authored by Marc Spitz)
- Tera Patrick: Sinner Takes All: A Memoir of Love and Porn, ASIN: B003RISWIY
- Bowie: A Biography, contributor (authored by Marc Spitz)

== Awards ==
- 1998: Named one of the 100 Most Influential Californians in the Music Industry by Bam magazine
- 2009: Best Music Journalist, National Association of Record Industry Professionals' Best in the Biz Awards.
