= MTV Party to Go 2000 =

Compilation album by Various artists
- Released: December 7, 1999
- Genre: Dance, pop
- Length: 57:44
- Label: Tommy Boy Records

MTV Party to Go chronology
| MTV Party to Go 1999 (1998) | MTV Party to Go 2000 (1999) | MTV Party to Go Remixed (2001) |

Professional ratings
Review scores
| Source | Rating |
|---|---|
| Allmusic | link |

MTV Party To Go 2000 was the fourteenth album in the MTV Party to Go series.

== Track listing ==
1. Everybody (Backstreet's Back) – Backstreet Boys
2. Here We Go – 'N Sync
3. Crush (Strobe's Deeply Crushed Mix) – Jennifer Paige
4. How Do I Live (Mr. Mig Dance Edit) – LeAnn Rimes
5. Sexual (Li Da Di) (Thunderpuss 2000 Remix) – Amber
6. Stay the Same (Tony Moran Radio Remix) – Joey McIntyre
7. 5, 6, 7, 8 (Extended Version) – Steps
8. Are You That Somebody? – Aaliyah
9. The First Night – Monica
10. Come Correct – Before Dark
11. Where My Girls At? – 702
12. Thinkin' About You – Britney Spears
13. How Do I Deal – Jennifer Love Hewitt
14. The Hardest Thing – 98 Degrees
