= A Little Bit of Ecstasy =

1997 single by Jocelyn Enriquez

Single by Jocelyn Enriquez

from the album Jocelyn
- Released: July 8, 1997
- Genre: Electronic, garage/house, freestyle, club/dance
- Length: 4:10
- Label: Tommy Boy
- Songwriter: Glenn Gutierrez
- Producers: Glenn Gutierrez; Peter Paragas

Jocelyn Enriquez singles chronology
"Do You Miss Me?" (1996)	"A Little Bit of Ecstasy" (1997)	"Get into the Rhythm" (1998)

"A Little Bit of Ecstasy" is a song by American recording artist Jocelyn Enriquez from her second album, Jocelyn (1997). Released in July 1997, by Tommy Boy Records, it reached number one on the US Billboard Hot Dance Music/Maxi-Singles Sales chart, number 15 on the Billboard Hot Dance Music/Club Play chart, number 25 on the Rhythmic Top 40 chart and number 55 on the Hot 100.

== Critical reception ==
Larry Flick from Billboard magazine wrote that Enriquez "inches closer toward the pop stardom she deserves with this trippy dance ditty," and that she "strikes quite the seductive pose atop music that careens from rubbery disco to space-age freestyle." William Cooper of AllMusic highlighted "A Little Bit of Ecstasy" as the album's best track, writing, "The sultry vocal, naughty lyrics, and unpredictable tempo changes make 'A Little Bit of Ecstasy' a dancefloor classic along the lines of Donna Summer's 'Love to Love You Baby'."

== Formats and track listings ==
CD single

No.	Title	Length
1.	"A Little Bit of Ecstasy" (Radio Edit)	3:44
2.	"A Little Bit of Ecstasy" (Booker T Vox Dub)	8:56
3.	"A Little Bit of Ecstasy" (Sharp Remix)	8:31
4.	"A Little Bit of Ecstasy" (Deeper Mix)	8:01
5.	"A Little Bit of Ecstasy" (12" Mix)	6:27

12" maxi

No.	Title	Length
1.	"A Little Bit of Ecstasy" (Sharp Remix)	8:35
2.	"A Little Bit of Ecstasy" (Deeper Mix)	8:02
3.	"A Little Bit of Ecstasy" (Booker T Vox Dub)	8:59
4.	"A Little Bit of Ecstasy" (Underground Vibe)	8:20

CD maxi

No.	Title	Length
1.	"A Little Bit of Ecstasy" (Album Mix)	4:10
2.	"A Little Bit of Ecstasy" (12" Mix)	6:27
3.	"A Little Bit of Ecstasy" (Deeper Mix)	8:01
4.	"A Little Bit of Ecstasy" (Cibola Mix)	4:10
5.	"A Little Bit of Ecstasy" (Radio Edit)	3:44
6.	"A Little Bit of Ecstasy" (X-Mix)	4:14

CD maxi - Remixes

No.	Title	Length
1.	"A Little Bit of Ecstasy" (Radio Edit)	3:44
2.	"A Little Bit of Ecstasy" (Booker T Vox Dub)	8:59
3.	"A Little Bit of Ecstasy" (Sharp Remix)	8:35

== Charts ==
Chart (1997)	Peak Position
UK Dance (OCC)	16
US Billboard Hot 100	55
US Hot Dance Music/Club Play (Billboard)	15
US Hot Dance Music/Maxi-Singles Sales (Billboard)	1
US Rhythmic Top 40 (Billboard)	25
