= Commitment (Lucky Boys Confusion album) =

Studio album by Lucky Boys Confusion
- Released: October 21, 2003
- Genre: Punk rock, pop punk, ska punk
- Length: 45:09
- Label: Elektra
- Producer: Michael "Miguel" Happoldt

Lucky Boys Confusion chronology
Throwing the Game (2001)	Commitment (2003)	The Red Tape Outtakes (Demos And Heartbreaks) (2005)

Professional ratings
Review scores
Source	Rating
Allmusic	link
The Tune	A link

Commitment is the third studio album by the Chicago-area rock band Lucky Boys Confusion, released on October 21, 2003. It is their second and final album released on major label Elektra Records and was produced by Michael "Miguel" Happoldt.

== Track listing ==
1. "Champions Dub" – 1:04
2. "Hey Driver" – 2:36
3. "Broken" – 3:08
4. "Mr. Wilmington" – 3:20
5. "Beware" – 3:06
6. "Commitment" – 2:47
7. "Atari" – 3:10
8. "Sunday Afternoon (ft. Half-Pint)" – 3:52
9. "Closer to Our Graves" – 3:32
10. "Something to Believe" – 3:00
11. "You Weren't There" – 1:30
12. "Blame" – 2:51
13. "South Union" – 0:43
14. "Ordinary" – 2:30
15. "Medicine and Gasoline" – 3:26
16. "Champions" (Bonus Track)

Note: The Japanese version of this album contains the bonus track, "Soldier Song". The track, "Hey Driver", was featured in the Vegas Car Chase scene in Looney Tunes: Back in Action.

== Personnel ==
- Kaustubh Pandav - vocals (Credited in the liner notes as “Stubhy”)
- Adam Krier - guitars, backing vocals, piano, organ, keyboards, percussion
- Joe Sell - guitars
- Jason Schultejann- electric and upright bass, backing vocals
- Ryan Fergus - drums, backing vocals
