= So Stylistic =

Studio album by Fannypack
- Released: July 8, 2003
- Genres: Miami bass; hip hop
- Length: 43:22
- Label: Tommy Boy Entertainment
- Producer: Tom Silverman

Fannypack chronology
So Stylistic (2003)	See You Next Tuesday (2005)

Professional ratings
Aggregate scores
Source	Rating
Metacritic	(78/100)
Review scores
Source	Rating
AllMusic	4.5/5 stars
Blender	4/5 stars
Entertainment Weekly	B−
The Guardian	4/5 stars
Pitchfork Media	(7.7/10)
Playlouder	2.5/5 stars
Rolling Stone	3/5 stars
Spin	(6/10)
Stylus Magazine	B+
Uncut	3/5 stars
The Village Voice	A−

So Stylistic is an album recorded by New York City rap group FannyPack. This, their debut album, featured the hit songs "Cameltoe," "Things," and "Hey, Mami."

== Track listing ==
All tracks are written by Goias, Grady; except where noted.

No.	Title	Writer(s)	Length
1.	"Intro"		1:06
2.	"Hey, Mami"	Goias, Grady, Suthiwong	3:23
3.	"The Theme from Fannypack"		4:17
4.	"Cameltoe"		3:34
5.	"Do It to It"		3:10
6.	"Sugar Daddy"	Corporation, Goias, Grady	3:13
7.	"Bunnies"		0:32
8.	"Things"	Darin, Goias, Grady, Hartwell	3:01
9.	"Hippopotamus"	Goias, Grady, PepGirlz	0:38
10.	"So Stylistic"		4:55

2003 CD bonus tracks
No.	Title	Writer(s)	Length
11.	"Fancy's Funny Shirt"		0:18
12.	"Boom Boom"	Goias, Grady, Hooker	3:04
13.	"Smack It Up"		3:41
14.	"Jessibel Phone Home"		0:36
15.	"System Boomin'"		4:14
16.	"All Around"	Beckley, Bunnell, Goias, Grady	3:12
17.	"Brooklyn Public"		0:28
