= See You Next Tuesday (album) =

Studio album by FannyPack
- Released: May 10, 2005
- Genre: Hip hop
- Label: Tommy Boy Records
- Producer: Tom Silverman

FannyPack chronology
So Stylistic (2003)	See You Next Tuesday (2005)	Ghetto Bootleg (2008)

Professional ratings
Aggregate scores
Source	Rating
Metacritic	(79/100)
Review scores
Source	Rating
Allmusic	2.5/5 stars
The A.V. Club	(favorable)
Blender	4/5 stars
Entertainment Weekly	B+
Pitchfork Media	(7.2/10)
Playlouder	5/5 stars
Q	2.5/5 stars
Robert Christgau	A−
Rolling Stone	3.5/5 stars
Stylus Magazine	B+

See You Next Tuesday is the second and final studio album by FannyPack. It was released on May 10, 2005 under Tommy Boy Records. The album's hits were "Nu Nu (Yeah Yeah)," "Fire Fire," and "On My Lap."

== Track listing ==
No.	Title	Writer(s)	Length
1.	"Intro"	Goias, Grady, Suthiwong	1:17
2.	"Keep It Up"	Goias, Grady	3:09
3.	"Seven One Eight"	Goias, Grady	3:29
4.	"On My Lap"	Goias, Grady, Lugo	3:44
5.	"Feet & Hands"	Goias, Grady	3:19
6.	"Reggae" (Skit)		0:50
7.	"Fire Fire"	Goias, Grady, Lugo, Smith, Whichard	3:22
8.	"Pump That"	Goias, Grady	3:16
9.	"Nu Nu (Yeah Yeah)"	Fingers, Hula, Townsell	3:47
10.	"Do My Rap" (Skit)		0:08
11.	"Twisted"	Goias, Grady	3:26
12.	"You Gotta Know"	Goias, Grady	3:46
13.	"Plug Me In" (Skit)		0:17
14.	"Keep On"	Goias, Grady	4:33
15.	"Not This"	Goias, Grady	4:44
16.	"Nu Nu (Yeah Yeah)" (Double J & Haze Remix)	Fingers, Hula, Townsell	3:29
17.	"Fire Fire" (Prophecy Dancehall Mix)	Goias, Grady, Lugo, Smith, Whichard	3:12
