= MTV Party to Go 1998 =

MTV Party To Go ‘98

Compilation album by Various artists
- Released: November 25, 1997
- Genres: Dance, hip hop, pop, R&B
- Label: Tommy Boy Records

Various artists chronology
MTV Party to Go 10 (1996)	MTV Party To Go ‘98 (1997)	MTV Party to Go Platinum Mix (1998)

Professional ratings
Review scores
Source	Rating
Allmusic	3/5 stars

MTV Party To Go '98 was the eleventh album in the MTV Party To Go series. The album was certified gold on February 23, 1998, by the RIAA.

== Track listing ==
1. "Not Tonight" (Cleen Radio Remix) – Lil' Kim
2. "Return of the Mack" (C&J X-tended Radio Edit) - Mark Morrison
3. "Quit Playing Games (With My Heart)" (Album Version) - Backstreet Boys
4. "Snoop's Upside Ya Head" (Radio Edit) - Snoop Doggy Dogg
5. "I'll Be" (Radio Edit) – Foxy Brown featuring Jay-Z
6. "Ooh La La" (Extended Radio Edit) - Coolio
7. "Block Rockin' Beats" (Single Version) - The Chemical Brothers
8. "Pony" (Extended Mix)- Ginuwine
9. "On & On" (Clean Version) - Erykah Badu
10. "Been There, Done That" (Radio Edit) - Dr. Dre
11. "If Your Girl Only Knew" (Single Mix) - Aaliyah
12. "No Diggity" (Album Version) - Blackstreet featuring Dr. Dre
13. "Steelo" (Album Edit) - 702
14. "In My Bed" (So So Def Mix) - Dru Hill
