= Jocelyn Enriquez =

Philippine-American dance-pop singer (born 1974)

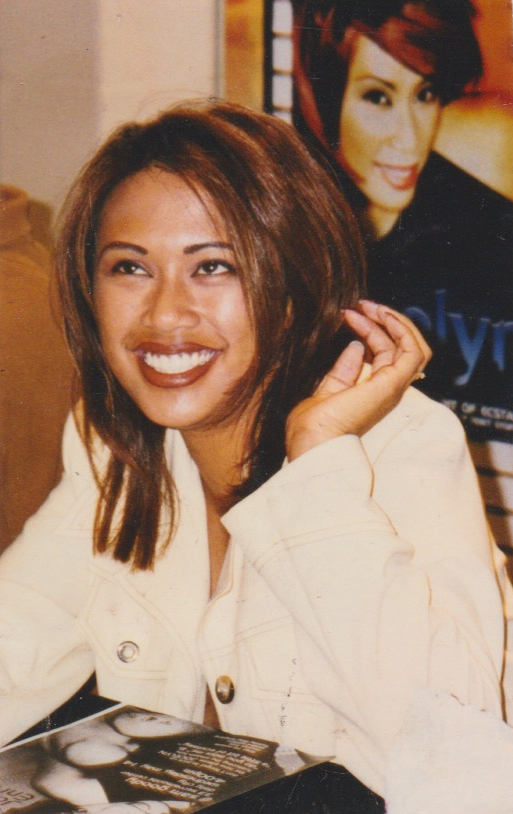
- Enriquez at the Serramonte Mall for the Jocelyn album signing at Sam Goody in May, 1997

Background information
- Born: December 28, 1974 (age 51); San Francisco, California, U.S.
- Genres: Dance-pop; freestyle; hi-NRG; EDM
- Occupations: Singer; songwriter
- Years active: 1990–present
- Labels: Classified; Tommy Boy
- Website: www.jocelynenriquez.com

Jocelyn Enriquez (born December 28, 1974) is a Filipino American dance-pop singer born and raised in the San Francisco Bay Area. Her most popular songs are "Do You Miss Me", "A Little Bit of Ecstasy", and the Stars on 54 (Enriquez alongside Ultra Naté and Amber) cover of Gordon Lightfoot's "If You Could Read My Mind". Her success helped inspire and pave the way for many Asian American, particularly Filipino American artists from the San Francisco Bay Area during the mid to late 1990s, such as Buffy, Kai, One Vo1ce, Legaci, Pinay, Sharyn Maceren, and others.

== Career ==
Enriquez was first heard singing at the age of 3 along to Anita Ward's "Ring My Bell". During her childhood, she received formal voice training with the San Francisco Girl Chorus and San Francisco Opera Company. During high school, she briefly joined girl group Pinay Divas (later known as Pinay), a reference to girl group En Vogue who were known as the Funky Divas. She continued to perform around the Bay Area and eventually a demo of her singing "If You Leave Me Now" by Jaya caught the attention of Classified Records.

In late 1993, she recorded "I've Been Thinking About You" and in early 1994, the single was a success. "I've Been Thinking About You" would garner a huge freestyle fanbase with the East Mix which included a popular freestyle sample at the time of the Afrika Bambaataa & Soul Sonic Force song "Planet Rock". The single gained heavy rotation in California, Texas, Florida, Illinois, and New York. As an homage to Victor Zaragoza, the DJ who in part broke the record on Enriquez's hometown radio station Wild 107.7, she recorded the song in Spanish too. Enriquez was labeled a "sell-out" by some members of the Philippine-American community because of her Spanish rendition of "I've Been Thinking About You".

Her debut album, Lovely was released in the summer of 1994, which was produced by Glenn Gutierrez and Mario L. Augustin Jr. (who also worked with Stevie B and Jaya) and Elvin Reyes. The album Lovely spawned several more singles: "Make This Last Forever", "You Are the One", "Big Love", "Big Love (Energy Box Mixes)" and "Only". Lovely was released in mid-1994. The third single released in late 1994, "You Are the One", led her to perform in San Diego where she would be introduced to her future husband. The fourth single, "Big Love" was heavily inspired by Donna Summer's "I Feel Love" would also be re-recorded, remixed and released as "Big Love (Energy Box Mixes)" as the album's fifth single. The fifth and final single, "Only" was released on a 12" single.

In April 1996, "Do You Miss Me?" would debut on Wild 107.7 and quickly gained traction. The single eventually became a top-40 hit on dance and pop radio (numbers 17 and 38, respectively), and peaked at number 49 on the Billboard Hot 100. The single was also successful outside of the US, reaching the top 20 in Canada. The music video was shot over a year later as the single maintained a popularity well into 1997 internationally. In 1996, Classified Records formed a joint venture with Tommy Boy Records and its imprint Timber! Records, this catapulted "Do You Miss Me?" as an international hit. Pop punk band Lucky Boys Confusion later covered "Do You Miss Me?" on their 2001 album Throwing the Game.

The follow-up single, "A Little Bit of Ecstasy" peaked at number one on the Billboard Hot Dance Music/Maxi-Singles Sales chart and number 55 on the Billboard Hot 100. The music video was directed by Francis Lawrence, who went on to direct Jennifer Lopez's "Waiting for Tonight" music video and the box office hits I Am Legend and The Hunger Games. The single was originally intended to be released in the fall of 1996, however, Jocelyn's high school knee injury caught up to her and was not able to walk. However, due to scheduling, she still recorded the video with an injured knee. As a compromise, Jocelyn was lifted around set and stayed stationary for her shots. After filming, she had surgery and returned to the stage for the San Francisco Bammie Awards in early 1997. She won for "Artist of the Year" and performed "A Little Bit of Ecstasy" for the first time. The success of the single also led her perform on MTV's The Grind and included in the box office hit A Night at the Roxbury and its soundtrack. Years later, the song was licensed to the DDRMAX2 PlayStation 2 game. A cover version by Josie was released on the Power Dance Hits Volume 1 album.

The Jocelyn album was finally released in May 1997. The album peaked at number 182 on the Billboard 200 albums chart and at number 11 on the Billboard Top Heatseekers chart. The saw three commercially released singles: "Do You Miss Me?", "A Little Bit of Ecstasy" and "Get into the Rhythm". "Even If" was opted as a single, Soul Solution remix eventually leaked, however, the single never happened. "Stay with Me" was exclusively released as a single in Brazil. The album would pave the way for her to perform internationally and lead to the Jocelyn Philippines Album Tour. She made several appearances on TV, radio and venues. While on Showbiz Lingo Splash, she shared the stage with Filipino icons Pops Fernandez, Ella Mae, Verni Varga, Zsa Zsa and Jaya, where they closed the performance singing "Even If".

Unfortunately, the joint venture between Classified Records and Tommy Boy Music ended and Enriquez opted to stay with Tommy Boy. She began working on material for her then third album which was intended to venture Enriquez in a more pop/R&B sound incorporating her dance audience.

In 1998, Enriquez, Amber and Ultra Naté joined for a cover of the Gordon Lightfoot 1971 hit "If You Could Read My Mind" as Stars on 54. The group's rendition of "If You Could Read My Mind" wound up impacting various charts worldwide; it landed at number 3 on the Billboard Dance Club Songs chart and number 52 on the Hot 100. The song would be the lead single for the film 54's soundtrack. The film's initial cut was rejected by Miramax, which lead to the a new cut to be made. This led to the Stars on 54 cameo at end of the theatrical released edit. Enriquez's response to appearing in the film: "My hair was so huge, oh my goodness. It was crazy! To be able film it at the actual venue, that was pretty cool."

The birth of her first child led to a brief hiatus and halt on her third album. In 2000, she returned with the Thunderpuss produced "When I Get Close to You" and reached number one on Billboard's Hot Dance Music/Club Play chart. This single led her to being the vocalist for "So Fabulous, So Fierce (Freak Out)", an interpolation of the disco anthem Chic's "Le Freak". The song appeared on the soundtrack of Walt Disney's 102 Dalmatians, and also appeared in the Dance Dance Revolution video game series.

After being released from Tommy Boy, Enriquez landed a distribution deal with Bayside Entertainment in 2002. She then launched her own label J.E.M. Entertainment. Her third album, All My Life, was released in 2003. The first single of the album, "No Way No How", was produced by Al B Rich and penned by Dee Roberts. The single peaked at number 17 on the Hot Dance Music/Club Play chart. The second and last single from the album was "Why". After the second single, she decided to focus on her family and faith and take a break from the music industry.

In 2018, she released the single "To Love Again". This would also mark the 20-year anniversary of "If You Could Read My Mind", in which Enriquez was interviewed for the Billboard article "Ultra Naté, Amber and Jocelyn Enriquez on their 1998 Stars on 54 collaboration 'If You Could Read My Mind'". Enriquez reflected on how she landed on the single; "They said, 'This is a good opportunity, but you have to go now!' I want to say I was in New York within three days so that I could record the song. We would all sing different harmonies and ad-libs, but never really saw the big picture until the end. So it was kind of mysterious how we recorded it." The following year, Enriquez also embarked on a Philippines tour to promote "To Love Again".

In 2020, she released a re-recorded version of "You Are the One". Production duo Black Caviar released a cover of "A Little Bit of Ecstasy" that same year. Her single, "Beauty Comes Through Pain" was released in the Philippines by Warner Music Philippines.

== Personal life ==
Enriquez graduated from Pinole Valley High School in 1993. She is married to Alain Macasadia. They have four children, Matthew, Ashley, Jonathan, and Timothy, and a grandchild named Alaia Rae Candido Joe Macasadia.

== Discography ==
- Lovely (1994)
- Jocelyn (1997)
- All My Life (2003)

== See also ==
- List of number-one dance hits (United States)
- List of artists who reached number one on the US Dance chart
