= Do You Miss Me? =

Single by Jocelyn Enriquez

from the album Jocelyn
- Released: 1996
- Genre: Dance-pop, freestyle
- Length: 4:08 (album version)
- Label: Tommy Boy
- Songwriter: Glenn Gutierrez
- Producer: Glenn Gutierrez

Jocelyn Enriquez singles chronology
"Only" (1995)	"Do You Miss Me?" (1996)	"A Little Bit of Ecstasy" (1997)

Alternative cover
- The Remixes

"Do You Miss Me?" is a song by Filipino American dance-pop singer Jocelyn Enriquez, released in 1996 by Tommy Boy Records, as the lead single from her second album Jocelyn (1997). Glenn Gutierrez wrote the song about the end of his relationship. It peaked at numbers 49 and 54 on the US Billboard Hot 100 and Cash Box Top 100 charts. Additionally, it peaked at number 17 on the Rhythmic Top 40, number 14 on the Top 40 Mainstream chart, number eight on the Hot Dance Singles Sales chart, and number 12 on the Canadian Singles Chart.

== Release ==
In April 1996, the single debuted on San Francisco radio station Wild 107.7 (now Wild 94.9). As momentum picked up for the single a joint venture between Tommy Boy Records, imprint Timber! Records and Classified Records was formed. The album release was halted to rerecord and remix songs as well as new original recordings. Months later "Do You Miss Me (The Remixes)" was released through the joint venture. They repurposed the original Jocelyn album cover picture for The Remixes. The Jocelyn album would include an exclusive remix inspired by Information Society's "Running." Years later the extended version of this remix would be made available on her MySpace page. It became an international hit which lead to her to tour countries such as Brazil, the Philippines, and perform on the hit talk show Ricki Lake and Much Music.

== Music video ==
More than a year after "Do You Miss Me"'s release the music video was released. An alternate edit of the video was available on Yahoo! which included a black and white checkered look and a different hair style.

== Track listing ==
CD maxi single [Classified Records]

No.	Title	Length
1.	"Do You Miss Me?" (Radio Mix)	4:08
2.	"Do You Miss Me?" (Energybox Mix)	3:38
3.	"Do You Miss Me?" (Dreamhouse Radio)	3:40
4.	"Do You Miss Me?" (Freefloor Edit)	3:38
5.	"Do You Miss Me?" (3Mix Radio)	3:33
6.	"Delerium"	4:43
7.	"Delerium" (Dreamhouse Mix)	6:04
8.	"Delerium" (Freefloor Mix)	5:12
9.	"Hookapella"	0:29
10.	"Freefloor Bonus Beats"	3:16

The Remixes CD maxi single [Classified Records/Timber! Records/Tommy Boy Records]

No.	Title	Length
1.	"Do You Miss Me?" (Radio Mix)	3:50
2.	"Do You Miss Me?" (Energybox Mix)	3:36
3.	"Do You Miss Me?" (Dreamhouse Mix)	6:04
4.	"Do You Miss Me?" (Freefloor Mix)	5:12
5.	"Do You Miss Me?" (Freestyle Mix)	4:59
6.	"Do You Miss Me?" (Marianna Mix)	5:43
7.	"Do You Miss Me?" (Acappella)	1:57
8.	"Do You Miss Me?" (Freefloor Bonus Beats)	1:46
9.	"Mr. Bolisario"	0:03

== Charts ==
Chart (1996–1997)	Peak Position
Canada Top Singles (RPM)	12
US Billboard Hot 100	49
US Hot Dance Music/Maxi-Singles Sales (Billboard)	8
US Rhythmic Top 40 (Billboard)	17
US Top 40 Mainstream (Billboard)	38
US Cash Box Top 100	54

== Cover versions ==
In 2001, a fast-paced rock cover version of the song was released by Lucky Boys Confusion. In 2021 Filipino pop singer Garth Garcia released a version and was a staple song at his concerts.
