= Party to Go =

Compilation album series

MTV Party to Go

Compilation album series by various artists
- Released: 1991-2001
- Genre: Dance-pop
- Label: Tommy Boy

MTV Party to Go is a series of dance music compilation albums released by Tommy Boy Records from 1991 to 2001. The first album in the series was titled Club MTV Party To Go Volume One and the only release to have 'Club' in its title. The albums were numbered up to Volume 10. After Volume 10, MTV Party to Go Platinum Mix was released containing past songs from the series. The next several releases in the series used the years (98, 99, 2000) in the title instead of volume numbers. MTV Party to Go Remixed was the last release of the series in 2001. A portion of the proceeds from the Party To Go series was donated to the AMC Cancer Research Center .

Volumes 1 and 2 were also released as DVDs featuring the music videos of the songs from their CD counterparts in the same sequences.

Volumes 1 through 6 of the series each featured at least one remix produced by the Ultimix remix service, a subscription-based company that produces and distributes special remixes of current hits exclusively to qualified disc jockeys, who adhere to their terms of service. All rights are reserved by the original artists and labels and therefore may give exclusive permission for their Ultimix version to appear on compilations. As a result, the Party to Go compilations were the only true means which the general public can obtain those specific Ultimix versions.

In their original forms, many Ultimix remixes featured heavy use of sampling. To avoid additional royalties and legal issues involving other artists associated with the samples, these were often edited out before being included on the Party To Go compilations.

MTV Party to Go Remixed was continuously mixed by Barry Harris and Chris Cox, better known as the remixing duo Thunderpuss.
