= The Definitive Collection (Edgar Winter album) =

Compilation album by Edgar Winter
- Released: 3 June 2016
- Genre: Pop rock
- Length: 2:04:52
- Label: Epic; Legacy; Real Gone
- Producer: Rick Derringer; Tom Moulton; Edgar Winter; Johnny Winter
- Compiler: Matt Quigley; Timothy Smith

Edgar Winter chronology
Playlist: The Very Best of Edgar Winter (2014)	The Definitive Collection (2016)	I've Got News For You (2018)

The Essential Edgar Winter

The Definitive Collection is a compilation album by American musician Edgar Winter, released on 3 June 2016, and includes tracks from The Edgar Winter Group and Edgar Winter's White Trash days. It is a re-packaging of the 2014 digital-only release The Essential Edgar Winter.

== Reception ==
Professional ratings
Review scores
Source	Rating
AllMusic	4/5 stars
PopMatters	7/10 stars

Stephen Thomas Erlewine from AllMusic believes The Definitive Collection "surpasses any previous Edgar Winter collection by providing 30 tracks recorded between 1972 and 1981."

PopMatters says "The Definitive Collection takes great efforts to improve on greatest hits packages of yore by putting literally everything in one place, going through his discography in chronological order and cherry-picking hits and quirks along the way, doing what it can to best concise packages".

== Track listing ==
=== Disc one ===
No.	Title	Writer(s)	Originally from	Length
1.	"Tobacco Road"	John D. Loudermilk	Entrance (1970)	4:07
2.	"Entrance"	Edgar Winter; Johnny Winter	Entrance (1970)	3:31
3.	"Hung Up"	E. Winter; J. Winter	Entrance (1970)	3:01
4.	"Where Have You Gone"	E. Winter; J. Winter	Entrance (1970)	2:40
5.	"Give It Everything You Got"	E. Winter; Jerry Lacroix	Edgar Winter's White Trash (1971)	4:32
6.	"Dying to Live"	E. Winter	Edgar Winter's White Trash (1971)	4:02
7.	"Keep Playin' That Rock 'n' Roll"	E. Winter	Edgar Winter's White Trash (1971)	3:44
8.	"Fly Away"	E. Winter; J. Lacroix	Edgar Winter's White Trash (1971)	3:00
9.	"You Were My Light"	E. Winter	Edgar Winter's White Trash (1971)	4:58
10.	"Save the Planet" (Live)	E. Winter; J. Lacroix	Roadwork (1972)	7:38
11.	"Rock and Roll, Hoochie Koo" (Live)	Rick Derringer	Roadwork (1972)	5:43
12.	"Free Ride"	Dan Hartman	They Only Come Out at Night (1972)	3:08
13.	"Round & Round"	E. Winter	They Only Come Out at Night (1972)	4:00
14.	"Alta Mira"	E. Winter; D. Hartman	They Only Come Out at Night (1972)	3:18
15.	"We All Had a Real Good Time"	E. Winter	They Only Come Out at Night (1972)	3:05

=== Disc two ===
No.	Title	Writer(s)	Originally from	Length
1.	"Frankenstein"	E. Winter	They Only Come Out at Night (1972)	4:46
2.	"Some Kinda Animal"	D. Hartman	Shock Treatment (1974)	3:07
3.	"Someone Take My Heart Away"	E. Winter	Shock Treatment (1974)	4:09
4.	"Easy Street"	D. Hartman	Shock Treatment (1974)	4:13
5.	"Animal"	E. Winter	Shock Treatment (1974)	4:54
6.	"River's Risin'"	D. Hartman	Shock Treatment (1974)	3:20
7.	"Chainsaw"	E. Winter	The Edgar Winter Group with Rick Derringer (1975)	3:15
8.	"Good Shot"	E. Winter	The Edgar Winter Group with Rick Derringer (1975)	3:40
9.	"Hello Mellow Feelin'"	E. Winter	Jasmine Nightdreams (1975)	2:48
10.	"Keep on Burnin'"	E. Winter	Jasmine Nightdreams (1975)	4:14
11.	"Solar Strut"	E. Winter	Jasmine Nightdreams (1975)	5:10
12.	"Rock & Roll Medley" (Live with Johnny Winter)	Otis Blackwell; Jack Hammer; Enotris Johnson; Robert Blackwell; Little Richard; Dave Williams; Johnny Winter; Chuck Berry	Together (1976)	6:05
13.	"Stickin' It Out"	E. Winter	Recycled (1977)	5:11
14.	"It's Your Life to Live"	E. Winter	The Edgar Winter Album (1979)	5:30
15.	"Tomorrowland"	E. Winter	Standing On Rock (1981)	4:03

== Release history ==
Date	Label	Format
October 23, 2014	Real Gone Music	Digital download
June 3, 2016	Real Gone	CD
