= Jon Robert Smith =

American tenor saxophonist (born 1945)

Jon Robert Smith (born 1945 in Lake Charles, Louisiana, U.S.) is an American tenor saxophonist, prolific as a rock and roll, R&B, delta blues, jazz, and fusion studio and live performance musician.

== Selected discography ==
As leader

- Jon Smith, Jon R. Smith (CD, arrangements by Lawrence Sieberth; produced by Lawrence Sieberth and Jon Smith), 2007, Grand Pointe Records

As sideman

- Edgar Winter, White Trash, (LP, horn Arrangements: Jon Smith/Edgar Winter), 1970, Epic Records
- Richard Landry, Solos — Live at the Leo Castelli Gallery, New York, February 19, 1972, Chatham Square; OCLC 7937237
- Edgar Winter, Roadwork (LP, horn Arrangements: Jon Smith/Edgar Winter), 1972, Epic Records
- Edgar Winter, Recycled (LP, horn Arrangements: Jon Smith/Edgar Winter), 1976, Blue Sky Records
- Edgar Winter, The Real Deal (CD, Featuring the Legendary White Trash Horns), 1996, Intersound Records
- Edgar Winter, Winter Blues (CD, Featuring the Legendary White Trash Horns), 1999, Pyramid Records
- Edgar Winter, The Best of Edgar Winter (CD, horn arrangements: Jon Smith/Edgar Winter), 2002, Sony Records
- Toto, Toto IV, (LP), 1982, Sony/Columbia
- Peter Maffay, Heute vor dreißig Jahren (CD, horn arrangements: Bertram Engel (de)/Jon Smith/Steve Howard), 2001, BMG/Ariola; OCLC 635787259
- Peter Maffay, X (TOUR ONLY), 2000, BMG/Ariola; OCLC 248313226
- Peter Maffay, Wenn eine Idee Lebendig Wird / Begegnungen Live (CD, horn arrangements: Bertram Engel (de)/Jon Smith/Steve Howard), 1999, BMG/Ariola; OCLC 725291498
- Peter Maffay, Something Will Happen (CD), 1998, BMG/Ariola; OCLC 725028481
- Peter Maffay, Begegnungen (horn arrangements: Bertram Engel (de)/Jon Smith/Steve Howard, CD), 1998, BMG/Ariola; OCLC 724823736
- Carl Carlton & The Songdogs, Revolution Avenue (horn arrangements: Bertram Engel (de)/Jon Smith/Steve Howard, CD), 2001, EMI
- The Doobie Brothers, Toulouse Street (LP), 1972, Warner Bros. Records
- The Doobie Brothers, Long Train Runnin', 1970, 2000" (CD), 1999, WEA/Rhino Records
- Randy Newman, Trouble in Paradise (LP), 1983, Warner Bros. Records
- Randy Newman, Guilty: 30 Years of Randy Newman (CD), 1998, Rhino Records
- Dr. John, Remedies, (LP), 1969, Columbia Records
- Rascals, Peaceful World (LP), 1970, Columbia Records
- Rascals, Island of Real (LP), 1971, Columbia Records
- Sarah Vaughan, Songs of the Beatles (LP), 1982, Columbia Records
- Jerry LaCroix, LaCroix (LP, horn arrangements: Jon Smith/Jerry LaCroix), 1972, Epic Records
- Redbone, Wovoka (LP, horn arrangements: Jon Smith/Charlie Brent), 1972, Columbia Records
- Rick Derringer, Rock & Roll Hoochie Coo: The Best of Rick Derringer (CD), 1996, Epic Associated/Legacy
- Johnny Winter, Saints & Sinners (LP), 1972, Columbia Records
- Sea Level, Long Walk on a Short Pier (LP, horn arrangements: Jon Smith/Charlie Brent), 1979, Capricorn Records
- Sea Level, Best of Sea Level (LP, horn arrangements: Jon Smith/Charlie Brent), 1977, Capricorn Records
- Albert Collins, Collins Mix - The Best of (CD, horn arrangements: Jon Smith/Steve Howard - The Legendary White Trash Horns), 1993, Pointblank Records
- Albert Collins & The Icebreakers, Live '92 - '93 (CD, horn arrangements: Jon Smith/Steve Howard - "The Legendary White Trash Horns"), 1993, Pointblank Records
- Clarence 'Gatemouth' Brown, The Man (CD), 1994, PolyGram/Verve
- Bobby Charles, Last Train To Memphis (CD), 2004, Proper Pairs
- Larry Garner, You Need to Live a Little (CD, horn arrangements: Jon Smith/Steve Howard - "The Legendary White Trash Horns"), 1994, PolyGram/Verve
- Larry Garner, Baton Rouge (CD, horn arrangements: Jon Smith/Steve Howard - "The Legendary White Trash Horns"), 1995, PolyGram/Verve
- Sonny Landreth, South of I-10 (CD), 1995, Zoo/Praxis
- Sonny Landreth, Levee Town (CD, horn arrangements: Mike Post/Jon Smith/Steve Howard/Sonny Landreth), 2000, Sugar Hill
- Junior Wells, Everybody's Gettin' Some (CD, horn arrangements: Jon Smith/Steve Howard - "The Legendary White Trash Horns"), 1995, Telarc Records
- Billy Branch, The Blues Keep Following Me Around (CD, horn arrangements: Jon Smith/Steve Howard - "The Legendary White Trash Horns"), 1995, PGD/PolyGram Pop
- C.J. Chenier & The Red Hot Louisiana Band, The Big Squeeze (CD, horn arrangements: Jon Smith/Steve Howard - "The Legendary White Trash Horns"), 1996, Alligator Records
- Coco Montoya, Suspicion (CD, horn arrangements: Jon Smith/Steve Howard - "The Legendary White Trash Horns"), 2000, Alligator Records
- The Mambo Brothers Blues Band, Night Owl (CD, horn arrangements: Charlie Brent/Jon Smith), 1994, Streetwise Enterprises Inc.; OCLC 263091518
- The Mambo Brothers Blues Band, We Got It Goin' On (CD, horn arrangements: Charlie Brent/Jon Smith), 1997, Streetwise Enterprises Inc.; OCLC 269018320
- The Forever Fabulous Chickenhawks (self-titled) (CD, horn arrangements: Charlie Brent/Jon Smith; Featuring Louisiana/Texas Legends Big Luther Kent, Al "TNT" Braggs, Jon Smith & the White Trash Horns), 1997; OCLC 525582798
- The Forever Fabulous Chickenhawks, Live (CD, horn arrangements: Charlie Brent/Jon Smith), 1996; OCLC 52203593
- Luther Kent, Down in New Orleans (CD, horn arrangements: Jon Smith), 1999, Louisiana Red Hot Records
- The Fabulous Boogie Kings, Nine Lives (CD), 1993, Gin Records; OCLC 27854811
- The Fabulous Boogie Kings, Louisiana Country Soul (CD, Produced by Jon Smith/Ned Theall, horn arrangements: Jon Smith/Ned Theall), 1993, Gin Records (Ville Platte, LA); OCLC 30985338
- Geno Delafose With The White Trash Horns (CD), 1994, Rounder Records
- The Fabulous Boogie Kings, Swamp Boogie Blues (CD, Produced by Jon Smith/Ned Theall, horn arrangements: Jon Smith/Ned Theall), 1996, Gin Records
- The Fabulous Boogie Kings, Walkin' the Dog (CD, Executive Producers: Jon Smith/Ned Theall, horn arrangements: Jon Smith/Ned Theall), 1999, CSP Records; OCLC 44392421
- Various Artists, A Celebration of Blues: Great Louisiana Blues (CD), 1997, Celebration of Blues; OCLC 38191175
- Various Artists, Absolute Blues, Vol. 2 (CD), 1997, Stony Plain; OCLC 607218532
- Various Artists, Big Blues Extravaganza: The Best of Austin City Limits (CD), 1998, Columbia/Legacy; OCLC 39537207
- Various Artists, Blues Masters vol. 17 - More Postmodern Blues (CD), 1998, Columbia/Legacy; OCLC 39661243
- Greenlight Caravan - Mother Earth Revival (CD). Saxophone, Room 909(M. Clark),Lay Down Low(M. Clark, D. Fontenot) (CD) 2008 Smashing Grass Records
