= Dying to Live =

Dying to Live may refer to:

- Dying to Live (2008 film), a documentary film by Ben Mittleman
- Dying to Live (2018 film), an Australian film about organ and tissue donation
- Dying to Live, a 1999 fantasy film by Rob Hedden
- Dying to Live (novel), by Kim Paffenroth
- Dying to Live (Derek Minor album), 2011
- Dying to Live (13 album), 2015
- Dying to Live (Kodak Black album), 2018
- "Dying to Live", a song by Edgar Winter from the 1971 album Edgar Winter's White Trash
- "Dying to Live", a song by Steven Curtis Chapman from the 1987 album First Hand
- "Dying to Live", a song by Exciter from the 1988 album Exciter
- "Dying to Live", a song by Scott Stapp from the 2013 album Proof of Life

== See also ==
- "Runnin' (Dying to Live)", a 2002 song by Tupac Shakur and The Notorious B.I.G.
