= Runnin' from tha Police =

1995 rap song

"Runnin'"

Song by 2Pac and the Notorious B.I.G. featuring Dramacydal, Stretch and Lil' Vicious

from the album One Million Strong
- Released: 1995
- Recorded: October 29, 1993
- Genre: Hardcore hip hop, gangsta rap
- Length: 4:58
- Label: Mergela Records
- Songwriters: Tupac Shakur, Christopher Wallace, Dramacydal, Randy Walker
- Producer: Easy Mo Bee

"Runnin'" (commonly referred to as "Runnin' from tha Police") is a 1995 song written and performed by rappers 2Pac, the Notorious B.I.G., Stretch, Dramacydal and Lil' Vicious. Recorded in 1993, the song holds significance as one of the few songs 2Pac and the Notorious B.I.G. recorded together prior to hostility arising between the two rappers. The song, originally slated to appear on 2Pac's 1993–1994 shelved solo album that later turned to be Me Against The World, then on Thug Life's 1994 debut album, Thug Life, Volume I, was scrapped both times due to varying controversies. It was later featured on the 1995 One Million Strong compilation album. It charted at number 81, number 57 and number 13 on the Billboard Hot 100, Hot R&B/Hip-Hop Singles & Tracks ahd Hot Rap Singles charts, respectively.

The first verse is performed by three of the four members of the rap group Dramacydal (referred to in the song as the Thoro Headz) who would go on to join 2Pac's Outlawz group (Young Hollywood, K-Dog, and Big Malcolm, in that order), the second by Stretch and the Notorious B.I.G., and the third and last by 2Pac, with the hook sung by Lil Vicious.

== Song meaning ==
Runnin' From tha Police deals with the authors' troubles with the police. The lyrics contain verbal abuse aimed at police officers, alluding to their deaths (two cops is on the milk box, missing, or let's serve these motherfuckers slugs [bullets] as a fuckin' meal).

== Releases ==
"Runnin' from the Police" was originally intended to feature on 2Pac's third album, not titled Me Against The World yet in late 1993. Because of Shakur's troubles with the justice system, the song was moved to Thug Life's debut album Thug Life, Volume I with a different 2Pac verse and a new hook, but it was finally refused by Interscope and cut due to heavy criticism of gangsta rap at the time, finally replaced by "Stay True" in the album. 2Pac eventually thought to move it back to his solo album but his fallout with the Notorious B.I.G. contributed to the decision not to feature the song on the album. It was finally released in 1995 as part of a compilation album of original hip-hop music titled One Million Strong, a release by SOLAR Records to commemorate the 1995 Million Man March in Washington, D.C.

There are three versions of the song, originally recorded in November 1993 and produced by Easy Mo Bee.

The first version, known as "Lil Vicious" version or sometimes mistakenly called "Me Against the World" version due to initially being slated to appear on the solo album, had the chorus sung by a child rapper named Lil' Vicious. It never released due to the controversy surrounding children performing in adult-themed media. In this case, "Runnin'" talked about drugs and shooting at cops, themes considered inappropriate for children.

The second version, often called the "Thug Life" version, had a different Tupac verse, a hook sung by Brown Man and the beat is slightly altered. Brown Man is the ragga voice in Joe's huge first single "I'm In Love". This alternate verse was later used by Eminem for his "Runnin' (Dying to Live)" remix on the Tupac: Resurrection soundtrack. Easy Mo Bee said in a recent interview that 2Pac recorded both verses the same day in November 1993. But this new hook and this edited beat could have been specifically made later in early 1994 for the Thug Life, Volume I album.

The third version called "Radio" version was mixed in summer of 1994 by Moe-Z MD who was giving final mixes to the Me Against the World album. This version is perhaps the most famous of the three as it was the only one to be officially released, and featured a more altered sample, a different chorus by Radio (a Long Beach rapper who had his album Recognize da Real also produced by Moe-Z MD), and the same lyrics as the Lil Vicious version.

== Sample, remixes, and legacy ==
The song contains a sample of the song "Munchies for Your Love" by Bootsy Collins from his 1977 album Ahh... The Name Is Bootsy, Baby!. The two earlier, unreleased versions of the song contain a much less edited sample.

In 2Pac's song "Dear Mama", a single from the album from which "Runnin'" was cut, he alludes to his vocals leading up to his verse in "Runnin'" ("runnin' from the police, that's right"). The verse in "Dear Mama" reads, "And runnin' from the police, that's right / Mama catch me, put a whoopin' to my backside".

In 1998, a remix was released in Europe by Swedish DJ StoneBridge called Runnin' (Stone's Remix). It sampled Kool & the Gang's 1975 song Summer Madness in addition to "Munchies for Your Love" and featured vocals from Chilean singer Deetah. There were two versions: the full length version and the radio mix. The radio mix is much shorter and omits all three verses from Dramacydal. The full length version only omits Big Malcolm's verse, and both versions omit Stretch's first verse. It was produced by StoneBridge and Felix da Soulcat.

In 2003, "Runnin' (Dying to Live)", a remix of this song produced by Eminem, was released as a single from the Tupac: Resurrection soundtrack. This version vastly differs from the original, using the 2Pac verse from the Me Against the World version, utilizing a different melody, discarding the performances by Dramacydal and Stretch, and having a sample of Edgar Winter's "Dying to Live" as the chorus. The remix charted at #19 on the Billboard Hot 100, and is arguably now more well known than the original.

The first lines from the Notorious B.I.G.'s verse ("I grew up a fuckin' screw up / Got introduced to the game / Got an ounce and fuckin' blew up") were later sampled as a hook on Ludacris' 2006 single "Grew Up a Screw Up".

== Charts and certifications ==
=== Weekly charts ===
Chart (1997)	Peak position
Australia (ARIA)	12
Canada (Nielsen SoundScan)	14
Netherlands (Single Top 100)	47
New Zealand (RMNZ)	8
Sweden (Sverigetopplistan)	37
UK Singles (Official Charts Company)	15
US Billboard Hot 100	81
US Hot R&B/Hip-Hop Singles & Tracks (Billboard)	57
US Hot Rap Singles (Billboard)	13

=== Year-end charts ===
Chart (1997)	Position
Australia (ARIA)	93

=== Certifications ===
Count	Provider	Certification
Australia	ARIA	Gold

== Track listing ==
=== 1998 Remixes ===
1. "Runnin'" (Stone's Radio RMX)
2. "Runnin'" (Stone's RMX Full Length)
3. "Runnin'" (Stone's Original Vibe Mix)
4. "Runnin'" (RMX Full TV track)
5. "Runnin'" (RMX Full Instrumental)
