= Mark Klein (singer) =

American drummer

- Also known as: The Little King
- Born: December 22, 1993 (age 32)
- Origin: Central City, Louisiana, United States
- Genres: R&B, soul, swamp pop, rock and roll, blues
- Occupations: Singer-songwriter, actor, travel show host
- Instruments: Guitar, bass guitar, keyboards, drums, mandolin, trumpet
- Years active: 2000–present
- Label: Unsigned
- Website: Markklein.us

Mark Hunter Klein (born December 22, 1993) is an American blue-eyed soul and blues singer-songwriter, actor, and member of The Boogie Kings, an American swamp pop band.

== Biography ==
Klein began singing at the age of two. However, he is most notable for becoming the youngest member of the legendary 1950s supergroup, The Boogie Kings at the age of 10 Ned Theall, a Cajun trumpeter and member of The Boogie Kings became his mentor after Klein e-mailed him and became a member of the band. Klein is a multi-instrumentalist; playing guitar, mandolin, keyboards, drums, and Bass guitar.

Klein recorded "Sick and Tired " on The Boogie Kings' 2007 album, Never Go Away. Klein, Louisiana Hall of Famer Allen Wayne and Gregg Martinez were dubbed "The New Breed" by the current members of The Boogie Kings after becoming members in 2005.

Before he joined The Boogie Kings, Klein recorded his first album, It's Just Me when he was 10 in 2004 and his second album, Blue Eyed Soul Patrol in 2006. When he was 6, he became a member of Louisiana Kids, an organization based in Louisiana for child singers and performers. At the age of seven, he became a member of Thunder-n-Lightnin, a duo consisting of Klein and Kayla Woodson, his singing partner. However, the group disbanded two years later.

Throughout his career, he has performed at bowl games, oprys, beauty pageants, larger festivals, nursing homes among other venues. He also works at Alexandria, LA NBC affiliate KALB as a promotions manager, host of local program "Down Home Louisiana," and has composed news themes for said station.

Klein is currently recording a third album, with songs Klein has mostly written himself. Released, will be the singles "The Kid Is Hot Tonight!" and "I've Done Everything For You".

== Discography ==
=== Albums ===
Year	Album
2004	It's Just Me
2006	Blue Eyed Soul Patrol
2007	'Unreleased Christmas album' (with Ashleigh Klein)

=== Unreleased songs ===
- "I Want to Thank You"
- "New Orleans Medley"
- "I Think I'm in Love"
- "I Wanna Rock You"

=== Singles with The Boogie Kings ===
- "Sick and Tired" on the album Never Go Away

=== Solo singles ===
- "The Kid Is Hot Tonight!", 2008
- "I've Done Everything for You", 2008
