= Max Volume =

American musician and radio host

- Max Volume playing his Dobro. 2012
- Born: Glenn Bailey; 20th century Glendale, California, U.S.
- Education: Truckee Meadows Community College
- Occupations: Musician, radio disc jockey

Max Volume (born 20th century) is the stage name of American musician, radio personality, and voice-over artist Glenn Bailey.

Volume is a disc jockey at Reno, Nevada, classic-rock radio station KOZZ, and a singer-songwriter and guitarist with the Max Volume Band. He has released seven albums on the Tadzhiq Music Group Label. Volume is the Afternoon Drive DJ, Mondays through Fridays, on KOZZ-FM 105.7.

== Early life ==
Born Glenn Bailey, Volume was raised in Glendale, California. He graduated from Crescenta Valley High School in La Crescenta, California. Volume earned an associate degree from Reno's Truckee Meadows Community College in 2006.

After receiving a guitar at nine years old, he taught himself to play and studied the music of Jimmy Page, Pete Townshend, and Neil Young.

== Radio career ==
Volume moved to Reno in 1979, and began working at Eucalyptus Records & Tapes. There, he met Michael Schivo and worked as a stagehand for High Sierra Concerts and Michael Schivo Presents. After meeting Bill Graham in February 1981, he worked as a stagehand for Bill Graham Presents, eventually becoming a voice for the Reno concert-market commercials.

He has played with rock drummer Chuck Ruff, and the rock band Terraplane. In the Fall of 1981, he took an internship at KOZZ radio station while attending Truckee Meadows Community College. Bailey first worked as on-air talent in March 1982. After noticing the phrase "Max Volume" was displayed on the face of many radio dials. Bailey adopted it as his on-air moniker.

He continued his radio career as a program director at Reno modern-rock station KRZQ from 1987 to 1992, followed by being a programming assistant at Sacramento, California, rock station KRXQ from 1992 to 1994, and finally working as a program director of Reno metal station KZAK from 1994 to 1996. He helped launch Reno active-rock station KDOT, and became music director for Lotus Communications Corporation. He has been an on-air disc jockey at KOZZ since 1997.

== Discography ==
- 1998 Psycho Betty BBQ (Tadzhiq Music Group), solo acoustic
- 2001 Written in Stone (Tadzhiq Music Group), solo acoustic
- 2006 Live Volume (Tadzhiq Music Group), solo acoustic
- 2007 Illuminaughty (Tadzhiq Music Group), Max Volume Band: Widgeon Holland, Chuck Ruff (of The Edgar Winter Group, and Sammy Hagar), John Gaddis, Max Volume
- 2009 Live8 (Tadzhiq Music Group), Max Volume Band: Lenny Supera, John Gaddis, Greg Sample, Max Volume
- 2011 Max Volume (Tadzhiq Music Group), Max Volume Band: Troy Mowat (of 7 Seconds), Billy Allen, Max Volume
- 2021 MV (Tadzhiq Music Group), solo acoustic: Max Volume
