= Chuck Ruff =

Chuck Ruff may refer to:

- Charles Ruff (1939–2000), American attorney
- Chuck Ruff (musician) (1951–2011), American rock drummer
