= Brother Johnny =

Studio album by Edgar Winter
- Released: April 15, 2022
- Studio: Capitol (Hollywood, CA); Infinite Spin; EastWest (Hollywood, CA)
- Genre: Blues rock
- Label: Quarto Valley
- Producer: Edgar Winter; Ross Hogarth

Edgar Winter chronology
Rebel Road (2008)	Brother Johnny (2022)

Brother Johnny is a studio album by American musician Edgar Winter. It was released on April 15, 2022, via Quarto Valley Records. The recording sessions took place at Capitol Studios and at EastWest Studios in Hollywood, and at Infinite Spin Recorders. The album was produced by Ross Hogarth and Winter, with Bruce Quarto serving as executive producer. It features contributions from Andrew Duckles, Billy Gibbons, Bill Payne, Bobby Rush, Bob Glaub, Charlie Bisharat, David Grissom, Derek Trucks, Doug Rappoport, Doyle Bramhall II, Gregg Bissonette, Harry Kim, Jacob Braun, Joe Bonamassa, Joe Walsh, John McFee, Josefina Vergara, Keb' Mo', Kenny Aronoff, Kenny Wayne Shepherd, Michael McDonald, Phil X, Ringo Starr, Robben Ford, Sean Hurley, Stephen Kupka, Steve Lukather, Taylor Hawkins, Tim Pierce, Waddy Wachtel, Warren Haynes, and Wayne Bergeron.

The album peaked at number 21 on the Billboard Current Album Sales, number 33 on the Top Album Sales, and topped the Top Blues Albums chart in the United States. It also reached number 6 on the Swiss Hitparade, and topped the UK Official Jazz & Blues Albums Chart Top 30. On February 5, 2023, it won a Grammy Award for Best Contemporary Blues Album at the 65th Annual Grammy Awards. It was ranked as the eighteenth best guitar album of 2022 by Guitar World readers.

The album is served as a tribute album to musician and Edgar Winter's brother, Johnny Winter, who had died on July 16, 2014, in Switzerland at the age of 70.

== Critical reception ==
Professional ratings
Aggregate scores
Source	Rating
Metacritic	69/100
Review scores
Source	Rating
American Songwriter	3.5/5
Classic Rock	3.5/5 stars
laut.de	4/5 stars
Mojo	3/5 stars
The Telegraph	4/5 stars

Brother Johnny was met with generally favorable reviews from music critics. At Metacritic, which assigns a normalized rating out of 100 to reviews from mainstream publications, the album received an average score of 69, based on four reviews.

Writing for The Telegraph, Neil McCormick wrote: "it may be billed as a tribute to a lost star, but this Winter wonderland serves as a reminder that the blues is still very much alive and kicking". Hal Horowitz of American Songwriter wrote that the album "should send blues fans, or those new to his catalog, back to the initial recordings to appreciate the guitarist's talents at their most inspired". Hugh Fielder of Classic Rock magazine wrote: "the results, from the likes of Billy Gibbons, Joe Walsh, Joe Bonamassa, Warren Haynes and Derek Trucks, are impressive. But ultimately you don't learn as much about Johnny himself as you would from listening to the originals of the 17 tracks presented here".

In a mixed review, Mark Blake of Mojo resumed: "for every peak there's an occasional trough".

== Track listing ==
No.	Title	Writer(s)	Length
1.	"Mean Town Blues" (featuring Joe Bonamassa)	Johnny Winter	5:04
2.	"Still Alive And Well" (featuring Kenny Wayne Shepherd)	Rick Derringer	3:42
3.	"Lone Star Blues" (featuring Keb' Mo')	Edgar Winter	3:57
4.	"I'm Yours And I'm Hers" (featuring Billy Gibbons and Derek Trucks)	Johnny Winter	4:49
5.	"Johnny B. Goode" (featuring David Grissom and Joe Walsh)	Chuck Berry	3:27
6.	"Stranger" (featuring Michael McDonald, Joe Walsh and Ringo Starr)	Johnny Winter	4:06
7.	"Highway 61 Revisited" (featuring Kenny Wayne Shepherd and John McFee)	Bob Dylan	5:01
8.	"Rock 'n' Roll Hoochie Koo" (featuring Steve Lukather)	Derringer	4:03
9.	"When You Got a Good Friend" (featuring Doyle Bramhall II)	Robert Johnson	3:52
10.	"Jumpin' Jack Flash" (featuring Phil X)	Mick Jagger; Keith Richards	5:13
11.	"Guess I'll Go Away" (featuring Taylor Hawkins and Doug Rappoport)	Johnny Winter	3:37
12.	"Drown in My Own Tears"	Henry Glover	5:31
13.	"Self Destructive Blues" (featuring Joe Bonamassa)	Johnny Winter	3:35
14.	"Memory Pain" (featuring Warren Haynes)	Percy Mayfield	5:44
15.	"Stormy Monday Blues" (featuring Robben Ford)	Aaron Thibeaux Walker	5:25
16.	"Got My Mojo Workin'" (featuring Bobby Rush)	Preston Foster	4:13
17.	"End of the Line" (featuring the David Campbell String Ensemble)	Johnny Winter	4:24

== Personnel ==
- Edgar Winter – lead vocals (tracks: 2, 3, 5, 7, 8, 10, 12, 15, 17), organ (tracks: 2, 11, 14), keyboards (tracks: 4, 10), piano (tracks: 5–7, 12, 13, 15–17), saxophone (track 5), mellotron (track 6), synth (track 6), clavinet (track 8), alto and tenor saxophone (track 12), producer
- Joe Bonamassa – slide guitar (track 1), lead vocals & guitar (track 13)
- Sean Hurley – bass (tracks: 1, 2, 4, 7, 11, 13, 14, 17)
- Gregg Bissonette – drums (tracks: 1–5, 7, 8, 10–17)
- Kenny Wayne Shepherd – guitar solo (track 2), lead guitar (track 7)
- Philip "Phil X" Xenidis – backing vocals (track 2), rhythm guitar (track 2), supporting vocals (tracks: 5, 8, 10), additional rhythm guitar (track 8), guitar solo (track 10)
- Kevin "Keb' Mo'" Moore – vocals & guitars (track 3)
- Billy Gibbons – lead vocals & solo guitar (track 4)
- Derek Trucks – slide guitars (track 4)
- David Grissom – guitar (tracks: 4, 5, 16)
- Joe Walsh – lead vocals (track 5), lead guitar (track 6)
- Bob Glaub – bass (tracks: 5, 8, 10, 12, 15, 16)
- Michael McDonald – lead vocals (track 6), supporting vocals (track 16)
- Tim Pierce – acoustic and electric guitar (track 6), rhythm guitar (tracks: 6, 8)
- Ringo Starr – drums (track 6)
- Kenny Aronoff – percussion (tracks: 6, 10), timbale solo (track 10)
- John McFee – slide guitar (track 7), supporting vocals (track 16)
- Bill Payne – organ (track 7)
- Steve Lukather – guitar solo (track 8)
- Doyle Bramhall II – lead vocals & guitars (track 9)
- Waddy Wachtel – rhythm guitar (track 10)
- Taylor Hawkins – lead vocals (track 11)
- Doug Rappoport – guitars (track 11)
- Stephen Kupka – baritone saxophone (track 12)
- Wayne Bergeron – trumpet (track 12)
- Harry Kim – trumpet (track 12)
- Warren Haynes – lead vocals & guitar (track 14)
- Robben Ford – guitar (track 15)
- Emmett "Bobby Rush" Ellis Jr. – lead vocals & harp (track 16)
- Jacob Braun – cello (track 17)
- Charlie Bisharat – violin (track 17)
- Josefina Vergara – violin (track 17)
- Andrew Duckles – viola (track 17)
- Ross Hogarth – producer, engineering
- Peter Brownlee – engineering assistant
- Chad Gordon – engineering assistant
- Jeff Fitzpatrick – engineering assistant
- Marciel Miranda – engineering assistant
- Mitchell Miller – engineering assistant
- Bobby Tis – additional recording
- Bruce Sugar – additional recording
- Casey Wasner – additional recording
- Brendan McCusker – technical engineering assistant
- Nigel Lundemo – technical engineering assistant
- Richard Dodd – mastering
- Bruce Quarto – executive producer

== Charts ==
Chart performance for Brother Johnny
Chart (2022)	Peak position
Swiss Albums (Schweizer Hitparade)	6
UK Jazz & Blues Albums (OCC)	1
US Top Album Sales (Billboard)	33
US Top Blues Albums (Billboard)	1
