= Chuck Ruff (musician) =

American drummer (1951–2011)

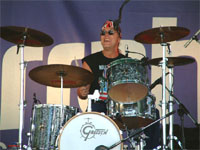
- Ruff in 2006

Background information
- Born: May 25, 1951; Reno, Nevada, U.S.
- Died: October 14, 2011 (aged 60) San Francisco, California, U.S.
- Genre: Rock
- Occupation: Drummer
- Years active: 1963–2011
- Formerly of: Sawbuck

Charles W. Ruff III (May 25, 1951 – October 14, 2011) was an American rock drummer well known for his work with Edgar Winter on the popular instrumental "Frankenstein".

== Biography ==
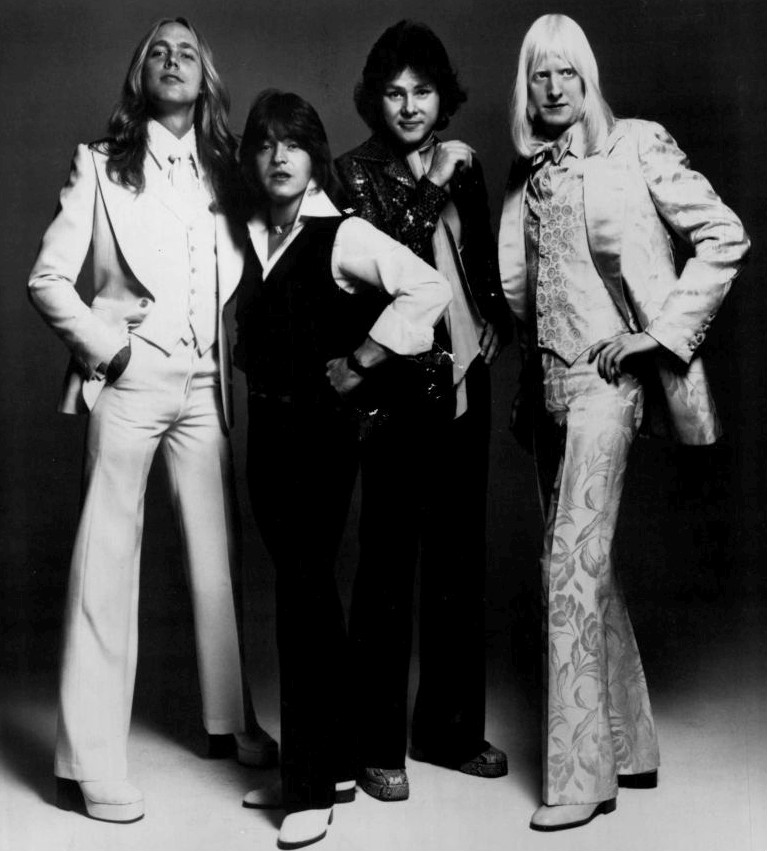
The Edgar Winter Group, 1975. L–R: Chuck Ruff, Rick Derringer, Dan Hartman, Edgar Winter.

Ruff was born in Reno, Nevada, on May 25, 1951, to Charles W. "Bill" Ruff II and Georgie Ruff.

He played in the rock group Sawbuck with Ronnie Montrose and Bill Church from 1968 to 1970. Ruff and Montrose later joined Edgar Winter with Dan Hartman to form The Edgar Winter Group in 1972. It was with this band that he had his biggest successes. The album They Only Come Out at Night (1973) featured "Frankenstein," which reached No. 1 in the U.S. in May 1973, and the top 15 single "Free Ride", which reached No. 14 that same year. The album Shock Treatment featured the top 40 hit "River's Risin'" and "Easy Street", which also charted.

In 1977, Ruff joined Sammy Hagar and performed on the albums Street Machine (1979) and Danger Zone (1979), including the song "Bad Reputation", which is in the film Up the Academy.

In his later years, Ruff continued performing music in Reno, Nevada, with the Chuck Ruff Group, The Max Volume Band (played drums on the 2007 album Illuminaughty) and his last project, Geezersläw.

Ruff played Gretsch Drums throughout his career.

== Personal life and death ==
In 1967, Chuck dated Kristine (Krissy) Pickering, who now sits on the Supreme Court Of Nevada, as of October 29, 2020.

Ruff died in San Francisco on October 14, 2011, after a long illness. He was survived by two sons, Dustin and Damian.

== Discography ==
- Sawbuck – Sawbuck (1972), Filmore Records
- They Only Come Out at Night – The Edgar Winter Group (1972), Epic Records
- Shock Treatment – The Edgar Winter Group (1974), Epic Records
- Jasmine Nightdreams – Edgar Winter (1975), Blue Sky Records
- Together – Johnny and Edgar Winter (1976)
- The Edgar Winter Group With Rick Derringer (1976), Blue Sky Records
- Street Machine – Sammy Hagar Band (1979), Capitol Records
- Danger Zone – Sammy Hagar Band (1979), Capitol Records
- Use It or Lose It – Michael Furlong Band (1984), Atlantic Records
- Fatal Attraction – Adam Bomb (1985)
- Illuminaughty – The Max Volume Band, Tadzhiq Music Group (2007)

== Filmography ==
- In Concert (1972)
- Kenny Rogers and the First Edition: Rollin' on the River (1973)
- Flipside (1973)
- Don Kirshner's Rock Concert (1974)
- The Midnight Special (1974)
- The Old Grey Whistle Test (1974)
- American Bandstand (1984)
