= The Real Deal (Edgar Winter album) =

Studio album by Edgar Winter
- Released: 1996
- Label: Intersound

Edgar Winter chronology
| Not a Kid Anymore (1994) | The Real Deal (1996) | Winter Blues (1999) |

The Real Deal is an album by the American musician Edgar Winter, released in 1996. Winter supported the album with a North American tour that included shows with Hank Williams Jr.

== Production ==
Jermaine Jackson, Leon Russell, Jeff "Skunk" Baxter, Rick Derringer, and Ronnie Montrose were among the musicians who contributed to the album. Aside from Jackson, Winter had played with all of the musicians before. Winter's brother, Johnny, also played on the album. Winter recorded the album in three days.

== Critical reception ==
Professional ratings
Review scores
| Source | Rating |
|---|---|
| AllMusic | 4.5/5 stars |
| The Encyclopedia of Popular Music | 4/5 stars |
| MusicHound Rock: The Essential Album Guide | 1.5/5 stars |
| Martin C. Strong | 4/10 |

The Sun-Sentinel wrote that "Winter displays more chops as an arranger than as a songwriter, his able combos doing slick renditions of mostly pat, wedding-band tunes."

AllMusic called The Real Deal "one of Winter's best albums in quite some time." MusicHound Rock: The Essential Album Guide noted that "flawless playing can't overcome the sterile recording ... which is as clinical as a jingle house."

== Track listing ==
| No. | Title | Length |
|---|---|---|
| 1. | "Hoochie Coo" |
| 2. | "The Real Deal" |
| 3. | "We Can Win" |
| 4. | "Good Ol' Rock 'n Roll" |
| 5. | "Give Me the Will" |
| 6. | "Nitty Gritty" |
| 7. | "Eye of the Storm" |
| 8. | "Sanctuary" |
| 9. | "Hot, Passionate Love" |
| 10. | "The Music Is You" |
| 11. | "What Do I Tell My Heart" |
