= One Million Strong =

Compilation album by various artists
- Released: November 7, 1995
- Recorded: 1994–95
- Studio: Air LA Studios (Glendale, CA); Soundtrack Studios (Los Angeles, CA); Devonshire Studios (Los Angeles, CA); Character Music Studios (New York); Galaxy Studios (Hollywood, CA); Ferguson Entertainment Studio (Stone Mountain, GA); GF Studios (Hollywood, CA); Chung King Studios (New York); House of Blues Studios (Los Angeles, CA); Audio Achievements Studios; Fonki Flex Studio (Indianapolis, IN)
- Genre: Hip hop
- Length: 1:17:04
- Label: SOLAR
- Producer: John Atterberry (exec.); Jalal Farrakhan (exec.); Jimmy "JT" Thomas (also exec.); 4th Disciple; Abnormal; Blaqthoven; Dalo; Danyell Thomas; DJ U-Neek; Dr. Dre; Easy Mo Bee; E-Swift; The Epitome Of Scratch; Tone Toven

Professional ratings
Review scores
Source	Rating
AllMusic	2.5/5 stars
RapReviews	7/10

One Million Strong is a 1995 compilation of hip hop music released by Mergela Records/SOLAR to commemorate the 1995 Million Man March in Washington, D.C. The compilation was released on November 7, 1995 and featured some of hip hop's biggest names, including the song "Runnin'", which was one of the few collaborations between 2Pac and Notorious B.I.G. The album peaked at number 36 on the US Top R&B/Hip-Hop Albums chart.

== Track listing ==
No.	Title	Writer(s)	Producer(s)	Length
1.	"Where Ya At?" (performed by Ice-T, Ice Cube, Kam, Mobb Deep, DA Smart, Insane, Shorty, Smooth B., Chuck D, RZA and Killah Priest)	Tracy Lauren Marrow; O'Shea Jackson; Craig Antoine Miller; Albert J. Johnson; Kejuan Waliek Muchita; Herman S. Smith; Insane; Jerome Washington; Darryl Barnes; Carlton Douglas Ridenhour; Robert F. Diggs; Walter Reed; Marqueze M. Ethridge	Jimmy "JT" Thomas	5:13
2.	"Runnin'" (performed by 2Pac, Notorious B.I.G. and Dramacydal)	Tupac Shakur; Christopher Wallace; Dramacydal	Easy Mo Bee; Moe Z.M.D. (add.)	4:45
3.	"Is It a Dream?" (performed by Channel Live)	Hakim Greene; Vincent Morgan; Troy Taylor		3:23
4.	"Meal Ticket" (performed by Tone Def Clicc)	Chico; Dap; Bam; Ant Dog; Tone Toven	Tone Toven	4:01
5.	"No Hand Outs" (performed by Tha Alkaholiks)	James Robinson; Rico Smith; Eric Brooks; Snaggle Puss; Alvin Joiner; Jason Smith	E-Swift	4:52
6.	"Mirror, Mirror" (performed by Smooth B., Val Young and Prince Ital Joe)	Barnes; Robert Taylor	The Epitome Of Scratch	4:15
7.	"Tight Situation" (performed by Kaotic Sypher, Bogous, True and P.I. Crazee)	Derek Dedeaux; Jimmy Singletary; Rhonnecia Bryant; Kenya Miller; Dante' Ozier; Danyell Thomas	Danyell Thomas	4:42
8.	"Hocus Pocus" (performed by Crazy Tee and C-No Gee)	Anthony Ransom; Carolyn Baldwin	Blaqthoven	4:16
9.	"187um" (performed by Dr. Dre and Snoop Doggy Dogg)	Calvin Broadus; Andre Young; Tracy Lynn Curry; Eric Dwayne Collins	Dr. Dre	3:42
10.	"Wicked Ways" (performed by Sunz of Man)	Chron Smith; Frederick Cuffie; Vergil Ruff; Reed; Ian Bellido; Selwyn Bogard	4th Disciple	4:45
11.	"Get Up" (performed by Black Wine)	Corell Curtis; Larry Nance; Layten Hyatt; Mike Marlow; Antwon "Insane" Tanner; Jimmy Thomas; Ronald Bell; James Taylor	Jimmy "JT" Thomas	4:57
12.	"No Surrender" (performed by Bone Thugs-n-Harmony)		DJ U-Neek; Bone Thugs-n-Harmony (co.)	3:37
13.	"Out to Git Minez" (performed by Step X Step)	Jimmy Hamilton; Vernon Jackson		4:18
14.	"Wake Up" (performed by X-Niggaz)	Damon X. Jones; James 2X Medlock	James 2X Medlock; Damon X. Jones	4:34
15.	"Livin' 2 Die" (performed by Top Authority)	Diallo Peacock; Dia Peacock	Dalo	3:35
16.	"Where Ya At? (Extended Version)" (performed by Mobb Deep, Chuck D, DA Smart, E. Rule, Merchant, Lord Jamar, RZA, Sunz of Man and Brooklyn Zu)	A. Johnson; Muchita; Ridenhour; H. Smith; Erule; Dennis Williams; Lorenzo DeChalus; Diggs; Reed; Cuffie; Ruff; C. Smith; Ellery Chambers	Jimmy "JT" Thomas	4:30
17.	"Destroy All Masters" (performed by Chuck D and Melquan)	Ridenhour; Melvin Keys; Abnes Dubose	Abnormal	3:43
Total length:				1:17:04

Notes

- Track 5 is listed as "No Hands Out" on some editions of the album
- Track 11 contains music replayed from Kool & the Gang's "Get Down on It"
