= Frankenstein (instrumental) =

Single by The Edgar Winter Group

from the album They Only Come Out at Night
- B-side: "Undercover Man"
- Released: February 21, 1973
- Recorded: 1972
- Genre: Instrumental rock; hard rock; progressive rock; blues rock; art rock
- Length: 4:44 (album version); 3:28 (single version); 3:02 (first single version)
- Label: Epic
- Songwriter: Edgar Winter
- Producer: Rick Derringer

The Edgar Winter Group singles chronology
"I Can't Turn You Loose" (1972)	"Frankenstein" (1973)	"Free Ride" (1973)

Audio
- "Frankenstein" (single version) on YouTube

"Frankenstein" is an instrumental track by the American rock band the Edgar Winter Group that was featured in the 1972 album They Only Come Out at Night and additionally released as a single. The piece was composed by Edgar Winter and the single produced by Rick Derringer.

The song topped the US Billboard Hot 100 chart for one week in May 1973. Frankenstein sold over one million copies. It fared equally well in Canada reaching number 1 on the RPM 100 Top Singles Chart the following month. That same month, the song peaked at number 18 in the UK Singles Chart. The following month, the song peaked at number 10 in Mexico. The song also peaked at number 39 in West Germany, remaining on the chart for one week. The single was certified gold on June 19, 1973, by the RIAA.

== Background ==
Coined by the band's drummer Chuck Ruff, the song's title came about from the massive editing of the original studio recording. As the band deviated from the musical arrangement into less structured jams, the song required numerous edits to shorten it. The final track was spliced together from many sections of the original recording. Winter also frequently referred to the appropriateness of the name in relation to its "monster-like, lumbering beat". (One riff was first used by Winter in the song "Hung Up", on his jazz-oriented first album Entrance. He later tried a variation on it, "Martians" on the 1981 Standing on Rock album.)

Winter played many of the instruments on the track, including keyboards, alto saxophone and timbales. As the release's only instrumental cut, the song was not initially intended to be on the album, and was only included on a whim as a last-minute addition. It was originally released as the B-side to "Hangin' Around", but the two were soon reversed by the label when disc jockeys nationwide in the United States, as well as in Canada, were inundated with phone calls and realized this was the hit. The song features a "double" drum solo, with Ruff on drums and Winter on percussion. In fact, the working title of the song was "The Double Drum Song". The group performed the song, with Rick Derringer on guitar, on The Old Grey Whistle Test in 1973.

In live performances of the song, Edgar Winter further pioneered the advancement of the synthesizer as a lead instrument by becoming the first person to strap a keyboard instrument around his neck, giving him the on-stage mobility and audience interaction of guitar players. The song was performed three years prior to its release when Edgar was playing with his older brother Johnny Winter at the Royal Albert Hall in 1970. This rare recording was released in 2004 as one of several live bonus tracks included in the two-disc Legacy Edition CD of Johnny Winter's Second Winter.

In 1983, Winter released a beat-heavy, more-synthesizer-heavy reworking of the song; its contemporaneous video, an homage with Winter appearing as Dr. Frankenstein, was added to MTV's playlist in November of that year.

== Reception ==
The song is described as a hard rock, progressive rock, and blues rock instrumental, and an example of art rock by non-art rock bands.

Record World called the song "a thumping instrumental featuring fine performances by each member [of the group]." Rolling Stone listed it number 7 on their top 25 best rock instrumentals.

== Personnel ==
- Edgar Winter – ARP 2600 synthesizer, electric piano, alto saxophone, timbales
- Ronnie Montrose – guitar (1958 Gibson Les Paul Standard)
- Dan Hartman – bass
- Chuck Ruff – drums
- Rick Derringer – producer

== Charts ==
Chart (1973)	Peak position
Australia (Kent Music Report)	19
Canadian Singles Chart	1
West German Singles Chart	39
Mexican Singles Chart	10
New Zealand (Listener)	19
UK Singles Chart	18
Billboard Hot 100 (US)	1

=== Year-end charts ===
Chart (1973)	Rank
Canada	22

== Certifications ==
Region	Certification	Certified units/sales
United States (RIAA)	Gold	1,000,000^{^}
^{^} Shipments figures based on certification alone.

== Cover versions ==
A cover version performed by WaveGroup Sound was featured in the video game Guitar Hero as one of five tracks in its sixth and highest difficulty tier, referred to in-game as "Face Melters".

The band Phish has played the song live 94 times in the course of all their live shows.

Ringo Starr & His All-Starr Band performed the song while Edgar Winter was part of the band, with Winter playing synthesizer, alto saxophone and timbales.
