= Arnold Eidus =

American violinist (1922-2013)

- Born: Arnold Eidus; November 28, 1922; Bronx, New York, U.S.
- Died: June 3, 2013 (aged 90) Delray Beach, Florida, U.S.
- Genres: Classical, Pop, Latin, Jazz
- Occupations: Violinist, Recording artist, Record company executive
- Instrument: violin
- Years active: 1935–2012
- Labels: RCA Victor, His Master's Voice, Phillips, Stradivari, Basta

Arnold Eidus (28 November 1922 – 3 June 2013) was a concert violinist and recording artist.

== Life ==
Eidus's father (Harry Eidus, 1897–1984), a Jewish immigrant from Dvinsk, Latvia, was a violinist; his mother (Sadie "Sonia" Birkenfeld, 1901–1983), who was born in New York, played piano. A child prodigy, Eidus made his performance debut at Carnegie Hall at the age of 11. He studied at the Juilliard School under Louis Persinger (who also taught Yehudi Menuhin, Isaac Stern, and Ruggiero Ricci). He met his future wife, piano student Doris Dresher, at Juilliard.

== Recording career ==
Eidus was a versatile session accompanist who recorded and performed in the classical, jazz, pop, rhythm, blues, and Latin genres. He recorded with Perry Como, Coleman Hawkins, Lena Horne, Marian McPartland, Ruth Brown, Paul Desmond, Freddie Hubbard, Raymond Scott, Wes Montgomery, Patti Austin, Perez Prado, Frank Sinatra, Doris Day, Edgar Winter, Cal Tjader, Carmen McRae, and countless others over a career that spanned six decades. In 1945, as part of the American Broadcasting Company's orchestra, he was a featured soloist in a New York recording of Paul Whiteman's re-orchestration of George Gershwin's Rhapsody in Blue. He recorded his classical repertoire for the RCA Victor, His Master's Voice, Phillips, and Stradivari record labels.

== Concert career ==
In the summer of 1937, at age fifteen, Eidus performed in the Naumburg Orchestra Concerts at the Naumburg Bandshell in Central Park, a performance which was attended by over 7,500 people. In 1946 he became the first American violinist to win the coveted Jacques Thibaud Award in Paris. In the 1950s, he emerged as one of the most sought-after commercial violinists in New York, working in TV, radio, and films, on the concert stage, and in recording sessions. His classical repertoire included works by Kodály, Beethoven, Elgar, Copland, de Falla, Henryk Wieniawski, Sibelius, Brahms, and others.

In reviewing a February 7, 1950, recital at Carnegie Hall, The New York Times wrote, "Mr. Eidus is a brilliant virtuoso with a flair for the dramatic—perhaps one might say the theatrical—and his recital was never dull for a moment." This concert featured the debut and only public performance of jazz/pop composer Raymond Scott's Suite for Violin and Piano (which reportedly was composed as a showcase for Eidus) during the composer's lifetime.

In the United States, Eidus performed as soloist with the New York Philharmonic under Leonard Bernstein, the Chicago Symphony under Izler Solomon, and the Los Angeles Philharmonic under Antal Dorati (at the Hollywood Bowl). In Europe Eidus performed as soloist with the London Symphony (at Royal Albert Hall), the Vienna Philharmonic, the Paris Conservatoire Orchestra, the Budapest Radio Orchestra, and at other prestigious venues.

Eidus served as Concertmaster for the American Broadcasting Company, performing on and directing a weekly chamber music series.

== Record executive ==
In 1950, Eidus and cellist George Ricci founded the Stradivari Records label. In its November 4, 1950, issue, Billboard magazine reported that Eidus and Ricci "are producing chamber music in which they perform. Eidus and Ricci also handle all technical work themselves, including recording on tape and mastering." Besides Eidus and Ricci, the label's artist roster included pianist Leopold Mittman, conductor Alfred Vittori, violinist Emanuel Green, conductor Henri Rosco, flutist Guido Novello, and violinist Reno Fantuzzi.

== Personal life ==
Eidus married Doris Dresher (1921–2004), of Maywood, New Jersey, in 1946. They had two children, Robert and Licia.
