= Gregg Martinez =

American singer

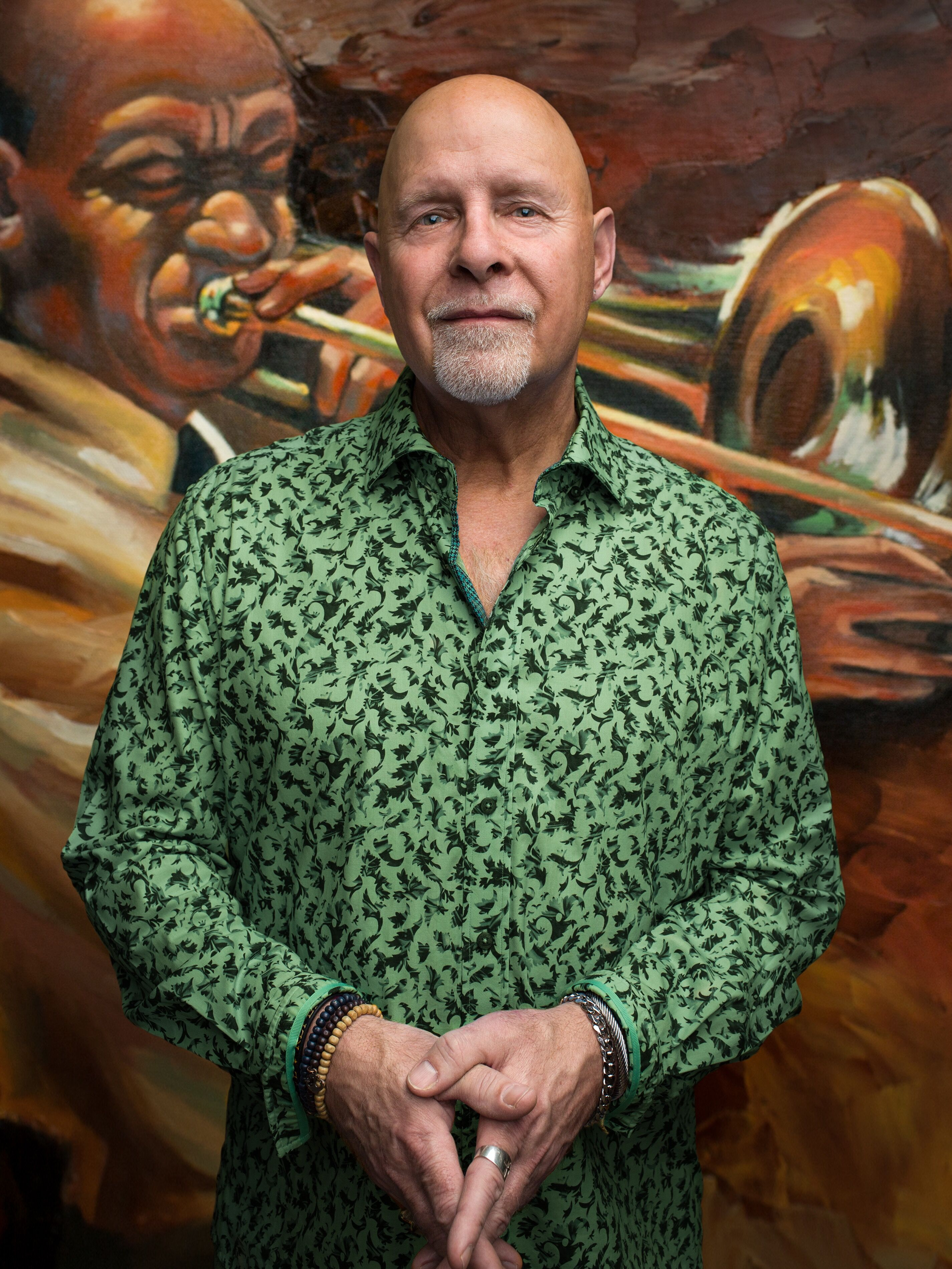
- Gregg Martinez 2019
- Born: Gregory John Martinez; August 2, 1956 (age 69); Lafayette, Louisiana
- Occupations: singer, songwriter, bandleader- instruments- guitar, trumpet
- Spouse(s): Brenda Borne (1977-1979); Janet Kinsey (1984-1987 1989-2012); Winona Glover (2018)
- Parent: Jimmie Martinez (1932-1976) Doris Grand (1933-2020

Gregg Martinez (born Gregory John Martinez on August 2, 1956 in Lafayette, Louisiana) is an American rhythm and blues singer and purveyor of the south Louisiana genre called Swamp Pop. He is also referred to as "Mac Daddy" and is a member of the Louisiana Music Hall of Fame. Martinez began singing in public at the age of eight in his home church in Carencro, Louisiana. He began his professional music career after graduating from Teurlings Catholic High School in Lafayette, Louisiana in 1974 by performing in the local nightlife scene of South Louisiana.

== Career ==
From 1981 through 1984 Martinez was frontman and bandleader of Gregg Martinez and Kingfish. In 1985 he began to tour nationally with a new backing group called the Heat. Within a few months he landed an exclusive contract with the Donald Trump casinos in Atlantic City, NJ, where he would appear regularly through 1988 and relocated to in 1986. He signed a recording contract with multi-platinum songwriter/producer/musicians Victor Carstarphen and Keith Benson - veterans of the Philadelphia, PA recording scene which included Teddy Pendergrass, The O'Jays, and Patti LaBelle. His recordings were not released. Martinez relocated briefly to Nashville in early 1989 but by the end of the year had moved to north TX near Wichita Falls.

In 1990 Martinez began a new chapter in his musical journey in the Contemporary Christian Music field. He released three Christian albums from 1991 to 1997. With the releases of For the Ages and All the Days, 1999, 2001, he began to blend the Christian music with the Rhythm and Blues of his earlier days. He formed Gregg Martinez Outreach in 1998 which most notably consisted of a public school anti-drug program which reached many thousands of students around the country.

By 2006 Martinez had relocated back to his native Louisiana and had also returned to the R&B/Blues/Swamp Pop genre with the release of Big Bad Daddy. At this time he also joined the legendary blue-eyed soul group the Boogie Kings. He wrote the title song for The Boogie Kings' 2007 release Never Go Away. Martinez'CD, Soul of the Bayou, was released April 30, 2016 on Louisiana Red Hot Records. It reached #2 on the national soul chart and #4 on the national R&B chart according to RootsMusicReport.com. Soul of the Bayou was also voted #8 of the top 50 albums in Louisiana 2016 by Offbeat Magazine. Martinez has been nominated five times for Best Male Vocalist by Offbeats' Best of the Beat Awards. On February 9, 2019 he was inducted into the Louisiana Music Hall of Fame. On July 17, 2020, he released "MacDaddy Mojeaux" on Nola Blue Records. It has been critically acclaimed and receiving extensive airplay worldwide. He is the leader and tours regularly with Gregg Martinez and the Delta Kings.

His vocal style has been inspired and influenced by the soul crooners of the 60's/70's including Sam Cooke, Marvin Gaye, Al Green, and Louisiana artists G G Shinn, T K Hulin, Big Luther Kent, and Johnny Adams.

== Discography ==
- Wonders Never Cease – Independent 1991
- Love Has A Voice – Independent 1993
- They That Wait – Independent 1997
- For The Ages – Seaul Records 1999
- All The Days – Seaul Records 2001
- Christmas – Seaul Records 2002
- Bring Down The Thunder – Seaul Records 2004
- Big Bad Daddy – Seaul Records 2006
- The Fabulous Boogie Kings: Never Go Away – Spice Records 2007
- South of the Parish Line – Magnolia Records 2011
- Creole Soul – Louisiana Red Hot Records 2013
- The Fabulous Boogie Kings – Legacy Recordings 2015
- Soul of the Bayou – Louisiana Red Hot Records 2016
- MacDaddy Mojeaux – Nola Blue Records 2020
