= Roadwork (album) =

Live album by Edgar Winter's White Trash
- Released: March 1972
- Genre: Blues rock
- Length: 66:13
- Label: Epic
- Producer: Rick Derringer

Edgar Winter's White Trash chronology
| Edgar Winter's White Trash (1971) | Roadwork (1972) | They Only Come Out at Night (1972) |

Professional ratings
Review scores
| Source | Rating |
|---|---|
| Allmusic | 4.5/5 stars |

Roadwork is a live album by vocalist/keyboardist/saxophonist Edgar Winter and his band White Trash, a powerful revue famous for their fusion of funk, gospel, R&B, and rock 'n' roll. It was released as a double LP in 1972. Roadwork was the second of only three albums the band recorded together.

Highlights include Winter's vocals and virtuoso keyboard work, plus the guitar stylings of Rick Derringer. The longest track on the album was the band's own version of the John D. Loudermilk song, "Tobacco Road", which lasted over 17 minutes, taking up an entire side of the album. Derringer contributed lead vocals to "Still Alive and Well" and "Back in the USA", and Johnny Winter made a special appearance singing lead and playing guitar on "Rock and Roll, Hoochie Koo". Louisiana native Jerry LaCroix, who shared lead vocals with Winter in White Trash, is also prominently featured.

The album was recorded before live audiences at the Apollo Theater and the Academy of Music in New York City and in Los Angeles at the legendary Whisky a Go Go night club. The album was certified gold December 18, 1974 by the RIAA.

== Track listing ==
| No. | Title | Writer(s) | Length |
|---|---|---|---|
| 1. | "Save the Planet" | Jerry LaCroix, Edgar Winter | 7:35 |
| 2. | "Jive, Jive, Jive" | LaCroix, E. Winter | 3:14 |
| 3. | "I Can't Turn You Loose" | Otis Redding | 3:57 |
| 4. | "Still Alive and Well" | Rick Derringer | 3:52 |
| 5. | "Back in the U.S.A." | Chuck Berry | 6:00 |
| 6. | "Rock & Roll, Hoochie Koo" | Derringer | 5:42 |
| 7. | "Tobacco Road" | John D. Loudermilk | 17:13 |
| 8. | "Cool Fool" | E. Winter | 6:03 |
| 9. | "Do Yourself a Favor" | Stevie Wonder, Syreeta Wright | 4:48 |
| 10. | "Turn on Your Love Light" | Deadric Malone, Joe Scott | 7:49 |

== Personnel ==
- Edgar Winter: Lead and backing vocals, keyboards, alto saxophone
- Jerry LaCroix: Lead and backing vocals, tenor saxophone
- Jon Smith: Backing vocals, tenor saxophone
- Rick Derringer: Lead vocals, guitar
- Randy Jo Hobbs: Bass
- Bobby Ramirez: Drums
- Marshall Cyr: Trumpet
- Mike McLellan: Trumpet
- Tilly Lawrence: Trumpet
- Johnny Winter: Lead vocals, guitar on "Rock & Roll, Hoochie Koo"
- Pete Weiss: Engineering

== Production notes ==
At the start of their appearance at the Apollo Theater, the host Frankie Crocker, a New York d.j. who introduced them, chided their evident late arrival saying (slightly off mic):

"Y'know, every time we used to go downtown to them jive jobs they give us, they always say 'black folks: late, can't be on time,' now look at the White Trash!" (chuckle)

The comment was met with laughter from the audience. After the introduction, the audience again broke out into sporadic laughter, and a loud gasp after seeing Edgar's albino complexion, possibly not expecting much from the band as it consisted of all white musicians (apart from drummer Ramirez), but their doubts were quickly dispelled when the band launched into "Cool Fool", a funky R&B song.

This snippet appears on the original vinyl release at the beginning of Side 4.

== Charts ==
| Chart (1972) | Peak position |
|---|---|
| US Billboard 200 | 23 |

== Certifications ==
| Region | Certification | Certified units/sales |
|---|---|---|
| United States (RIAA) | Gold | 500,000^{^} |
^{^} Shipments figures based on certification alone.
