= Jasmine Nightdreams =

Studio album by Edgar Winter
- Released: June 1975
- Genre: Rock, jazz rock
- Length: 45:12
- Label: CBS, Blue Sky
- Producer: Edgar Winter, Dan Hartman

Edgar Winter chronology
Shock Treatment (1974)	Jasmine Nightdreams (1975)	The Edgar Winter Group With Rick Derringer (1975)

Jasmine Nightdreams is the fifth studio album by Edgar Winter, released in 1975.

== Track listing ==
All tracks are written by Edgar Winter, except where indicated.

No.	Title	Writer(s)	Length
1.	"One Day Tomorrow"	Edgar Winter, Dan Hartman	3:10
2.	"Little Brother"		4:08
3.	"Hello Mellow Feelin'"		2:47
4.	"Tell Me in a Whisper"	Winter, Hartman	3:25
5.	"Shuffle-Low"		4:20
6.	"Keep On Burnin'"		4:12
7.	"How Do You Like Your Love"		3:03
8.	"I Always Wanted You"		3:21
9.	"Outa Control"		4:09
10.	"All Out"		5:11
11.	"Sky Train"		2:16
12.	"Solar Strut"		5:10

== Personnel ==
=== Musicians ===
- Edgar Winter - "the nightdreamer" - vocals, saxophone, keyboards, synthesizer
- Johnny Winter - "slide rider" - slide guitar, harmonica
- Rick Derringer - "live wire+" - guitar
- Dan Hartman - "co-creator" - bass guitar, vocals
- Chuck Ruff - "rougé" - drums
- Rick Marotta - "the different drummer" - drums

=== Technical ===
- Design – John Berg, Teresa Alfieri
- Directed by – Rick Dobbis
- Directed by – Steve Paul
- Engineer – Dan Hartman
- Engineer (quadraphonic remix) – Shelly Yakus
- Engineer (quadraphonic sound) – Dan Hartman, Edgar Winter
- Mastered by (disc master) – Greg Calbi
- Mixed by (assistant) – David Thoener, Jimmy Iovine, Rod O'Brien
- Mixed by (mix master) – Shelly Yakus
- Photography (cover) – Steinbicker/ Houghton
- Photography (inside) – Bruce Weber, Wendi E. Lombardi
- Remix (supervision) – Dan Hartman, Edgar Winter

== Charts ==
Chart (1975)	Peak position
US Billboard 200	69
