= They Only Come Out at Night =

Studio album by the Edgar Winter Group
- Released: November 1972
- Recorded: August–September 1972
- Studios: Hit Factory and Sterling Sound, New York
- Genres: Rock; hard rock
- Length: 34:47
- Label: Epic
- Producer: Rick Derringer

The Edgar Winter Group chronology
Roadwork (1972)	They Only Come Out at Night (1972)	Shock Treatment (1974)

Professional ratings
Review scores
Source	Rating
AllMusic	4.5/5 stars
Christgau's Record Guide	B

They Only Come Out at Night is the debut studio album by American rock band the Edgar Winter Group, released in November 1972 by Epic Records. A commercial success, the album reached #3 on the US Billboard 200 chart and features the band's signature songs, "Frankenstein" and "Free Ride". The album was certified gold on April 30, 1973, and platinum on November 21, 1986, by the RIAA. The single "Frankenstein" was certified gold June 19, 1973, by the RIAA. In Canada, the album reached #4 on 2 separate occasions - May 5 and June 16, totaling 14 weeks in the top 10. The third single, "Hangin' Around", reached #39 in the singles chart.

== Overview ==
Recording for the first time as the Edgar Winter Group, Winter assembled an all-star lineup which featured himself, songwriter and multi-instrumentalist Dan Hartman, San Francisco guitarist Ronnie Montrose, and producer/guitarist Rick Derringer, with Eagles' producer Bill Szymczyk serving as technical director.

Montrose had recently left Van Morrison's band and didn't view himself as a rock guitarist when he joined the Edgar Winter Group. "(Winter) so much wanted to do that whole rock thing that he encouraged me," said the guitarist. "I was in the Edgar Winter Group, and I had better start delivering this heavy guitar music. Now. Because I hadn't done that before."

Only twenty-one years old when the album was recorded, Hartman was a child prodigy who had played with Winter's brother Johnny in the past. Hartman wrote or co-wrote six of the album's ten tracks while also contributing vocals, electric and acoustic guitar, ukulele, bass, maracas, and percussion. "Dan was a true genius and a musical visionary", said Winter. "The group would never have been the same without Dan."

"Free Ride" was chosen by Winter as the album's first single. Though it fared poorly initially, it became a hit after the followup single "Frankenstein" went to number 1 on the singles chart. Hartman had written "Free Ride" before joining Winter's band, and it is Hartman who plays the song's signature opening guitar chords. "I've never heard anybody play it with exactly the same feel as Dan", Winter has said. Two guitar solos are played simultaneously by Montrose on the song in an attempt to get an Eric Clapton feel.

The main riff of "Frankenstein" originated when Winter was playing with his brother Johnny in the late 1960s, and the song developed as a live staple. "I wanted an instrumental that I could use as a showcase. I thought of myself as an instrumentalist, not as a singer", Winter said. From that riff, the song developed into a jam in which Winter improvised a dual drum solo with drummer Red Turner. The song was played live many times before Winter ever considered recording it. "We played that song all over the world and then completely forgot about it. I didn't think of it for years", he said. Initially known simply as "The Instrumental", the band warmed up each day in the studio by playing the song. During the album sessions, it was producer Rick Derringer who convinced Winter to try to turn it into "something that would be usable" for inclusion on the album. Winter recalls that editing the song in the studio was a chore, with audiotape "lying all over the control room". "(It was) draped over the backs of chairs and overflowing the console and the couch. And we were trying to figure out how to put it all back together." The song obtained its title during recording when drummer Chuck Ruff heard a rough mix and said "Wow, man, it's like Frankenstein." "As soon as I heard 'Frankenstein', the monster was born", Winter recalled.

== Track listing ==
- The lengths of "Alta Mira" and "Free Ride" were likely swapped by mistake, as each track plays at the length that is printed beside the other.

Side one
No.	Title	Writer(s)	Length
1.	"Hangin' Around"	Edgar Winter; Dan Hartman	3:02
2.	"When It Comes"	E. Winter; Hartman	3:16
3.	"Alta Mira"	E. Winter; Hartman	3:08
4.	"Free Ride"	Hartman	3:20
5.	"Undercover Man"	E. Winter	3:49

Side two
No.	Title	Writer(s)	Length
6.	"Round & Round"	E. Winter	4:00
7.	"Rock 'n' Roll Boogie Woogie Blues"	E. Winter; Barbara Winter; Ronnie Montrose	3:25
8.	"Autumn"	Hartman	3:00
9.	"We All Had a Real Good Time"	E. Winter; Hartman	3:05
10.	"Frankenstein"	E. Winter	4:44
Total length:			34:47

== Personnel ==
=== The Edgar Winter Group ===
- Edgar Winter – organ, ARP 2600 synthesizer, piano, clavinet, marimba on "Alta Mira", saxophone, timbales, lead and backing vocals, liner notes
- Dan Hartman – bass, rhythm guitar, ukulele, percussion, maracas, lead vocals on tracks 1, 4, 8 and 9 backing vocals
- Ronnie Montrose – lead guitar, 12 string guitar, mandolin
- Chuck Ruff – drums, congas, vocals

=== Additional personnel ===
- Rick Derringer – slide guitar, pedal steel guitar, bass, backing vocals, claves, producer
- Randy Jo Hobbs – bass on "Free Ride" and "We All Had a Real Good Time"
- Johnny Badanjek – drums on "Free Ride" and "We All Had a Real Good Time"

=== Technical personnel ===
- Bill Szymczyk – technical director
- Harry Maslin – engineer, Hit Factory Studios
- Steve Paul – organic director

== Charts ==
Chart (1972-73)	Peak position
Australian Albums (Kent Music Report)	28
Canada Top Albums/CDs (RPM)	4
US Billboard 200	3

== Certifications ==
Region	Certification	Certified units/sales
Canada (Music Canada)	2× Platinum	200,000^{^}
United States (RIAA)	2× Platinum	2,000,000^{^}
^{^} Shipments figures based on certification alone.
