= Dying to Live (2008 film) =

Dying to Live: The Journey into a Man's Open Heart
- Directed by: Ben Mittleman
- Written by: Ben Mittleman
- Produced by: Robert F. Landau
- Starring: Ben Mittleman
- Edited by: Robert F. Landau
- Music by: Marc Chait
- Distributed by: HomeStan Productions, Inc.
- Release date: 2008
- Running time: 110 minutes
- Country: United States
- Language: English

Dying to Live: The Journey into a Man's Open Heart is a documentary film by actor and filmmaker Ben Mittleman. The film is based on his experiences through open-heart surgery while caring for his wife and his mother as they struggle with life-threatening illnesses.

== Synopsis ==
Documentary filmmaker Ben Mittleman turns the camera on himself when confronted with the same open-heart surgery that derailed his father's life. A quest for truth, Dying to Live gives public exposure to his own fears about mortality. In the same year Mittleman's wife Valerie and mother Anne each struggle with their own life-threatening illnesses. And, it's these affairs of his heart that contain the soul of Dying to Live. A love letter to Valerie, Dying to Live reveals the raw realities of Mittleman's fight to survive and heal the women who love him. With rare humor and spirit, the tale is told of an ordinary man struggling as he dives deeper into adulthood.

== Outreach ==
The film premiered as a benefit for the Los Angeles Caregivers Resource Center and was also featured at the 2008 American Society on Aging and National Council on Aging Media Festival. Dying to Live was also screened at the Jacksonville Film Festival.
