= Runnin' (Dying to Live) =

Single by 2Pac featuring The Notorious B.I.G.

from the album Tupac: Resurrection
- Released: September 30, 2003
- Recorded: 1993
- Genre: Hardcore hip hop
- Length: 3:52
- Label: Amaru; Interscope
- Songwriters: Tupac Shakur; Christopher Wallace; Osten Harvey; Marshall Mathers; Edgar Winter; Luis Resto
- Producer: Eminem • Easy Mo Bee

2Pac singles chronology
"Still Ballin'" (2003)	"Runnin' (Dying to Live)" (2003)	"Thugs Get Lonely Too" (2004)

The Notorious B.I.G. singles chronology
"Notorious B.I.G." (1999)	"Runnin' (Dying to Live)" (2003)	"Nasty Girl" (2005)

"Runnin' (Dying to Live)", is a posthumous song by the American rapper 2Pac, with an additional posthumous verse from the Notorious B.I.G. It was released as the first single from the soundtrack album Tupac: Resurrection on September 30, 2003.

Produced by Eminem, the song uses the Notorious B.I.G.'s vocals from a 1993 recording known as "Runnin' from tha Police", one of the few collaborations recorded by 2Pac and the Notorious B.I.G. during their lifetimes. 2Pac's vocals are taken from a re-recorded version intended for Thug Life's only studio album Thug Life: Vol. 1 that was later scrapped due to the feud between both artists.

The song peaked at number 19 for the week of December 20, 2003, on the Billboard Hot 100, becoming one of 2Pac's highest charting songs and his second most successful posthumous release as a lead artist.

== Overview ==
The song is a remake of an Easy Mo Bee–produced song called "Runnin' from tha Police", recorded by Tupac Shakur and the Notorious B.I.G. in 1993. Easy Mo Bee subsequently received songwriting credits on "Runnin' (Dying To Live)".

The chorus is from Edgar Winter's song "Dying to Live" (from the album Edgar Winter's White Trash). "Dying to Live" was originally recorded in the key of A major, but is pitched up to the key of C# major. The interview of the Notorious B.I.G. heard at the end of the track was recorded only a few weeks before his death.

== Music video ==
The video contains interviews of both Tupac and the Notorious B.I.G. It is the only song from the album to feature a music video. The video version mutes all language, violence and drug references, even Biggie's comment about two cops being shot (the radio version only censors all profanity except the word "bitches" in 2Pac's verse). In the video, it has past images and videos of 2Pac and Biggie, and once their verses end, the song fades out.

== Awards and nominations ==
Year	Ceremony	Award	Result
2005	ASCAP Rhythm & Soul Music Awards	Top Soundtrack Song of the Year	Won

== Track listing ==
Credits adapted from the single's liner notes.

UK CD single
No.	Title	Writer(s)	Producer(s)	Length
1.	"Runnin' (Dying to Live)" (featuring the Notorious B.I.G.)	Tupac Shakur; Christopher Wallace; Osten Harvey; Marshall Mathers; Edgar Winter; Luis Resto	Eminem	3:51
2.	"Still Ballin'" (Nitty remix) (featuring Trick Daddy)	Shakur; Johnny Jackson; Francisco Pimentel; Maurice Young	Nitty^{[a]}	2:49
Total length:				6:40

=== Notes ===
- ^{^[a]} signifies a remixer.
- "Runnin' (Dying to Live)" was originally produced by Easy Mo Bee. The song features members of the Outlawz Yaki Kadafi, E.D.I. Mean and Kastro, as well as rapper the Notorious B.I.G. and Live Squad rapper and producer Big Stretch
- ”Still Ballin’” was originally produced by Johnny "J", and the song featured Kurupt from Tha Dogg Pound

== Charts ==
=== Weekly charts ===
Chart (1998–2004)	Peak position
Austria (Ö3 Austria Top 40)	19
Belgium (Ultratop 50 Flanders)	30
Belgium (Ultratop 50 Wallonia)	2
France (SNEP)	28
Germany (GfK)	12
Ireland (IRMA)	15
Netherlands (Dutch Top 40)	15
Netherlands (Single Top 100)	13
New Zealand (Recorded Music NZ)	8
Scotland Singles (OCC)	19
Sweden (Sverigetopplistan)	37
Switzerland (Schweizer Hitparade)	9
UK Hip Hop/R&B (OCC)	4
UK Singles (OCC)	17
US Billboard Hot 100	19
US Hot R&B/Hip-Hop Songs (Billboard)	11
US Hot Rap Songs (Billboard)	5

=== Year-end charts ===
Chart (2004)	Position
Germany (Media Control GfK)	64
Netherlands (Single Top 100)	97
Switzerland (Schweizer Hitparade)	45
US Hot R&B/Hip-Hop Singles & Tracks (Billboard)	65

== Certifications ==
Region	Certification	Certified units/sales
New Zealand (RMNZ)	Gold	15,000^{‡}
^{‡} Sales+streaming figures based on certification alone.
