= Bertram Engel =

German rock drummer (born 1957)

Bertram Lutz Wilhelm Passmann, better known by his stage name Bertram Engel (born 27 November 1957 in Burgsteinfurt), is a German rock drummer.

Engel is best known for his work within Udo Lindenberg's Panikorchester, where he replaced Keith Forsey in 1976. Other musical collaborations include among others Eric Burdon, The Pretty Things, Jimmy Barnes and Robert Palmer. He has a guest appearance on drums in the Bruce Springsteen video "Hungry Heart" and can be heard playing drums on the Springsteen bootleg-album Secret Berlin Night.

== Biography ==
Engel began playing the piano at the age of seven. Later in his teenage years he attended the Music Academy in Münster where drums became his main skill.

Along with his eight-year-older brother Thomas Engel, the 1970s became the year where they released an album under the name Gebrüder Engel. He later came to meet Udo Lindenberg who pledged him as a drummer of his Panikorchester. Besides he also worked with Peter Maffay over four decades.

In the bands of these two musicians, Bertram Engel has been a member for years and he has been involved in studio recordings and on stage as drummer, composer and producer for decades.
