= Luther Kent =

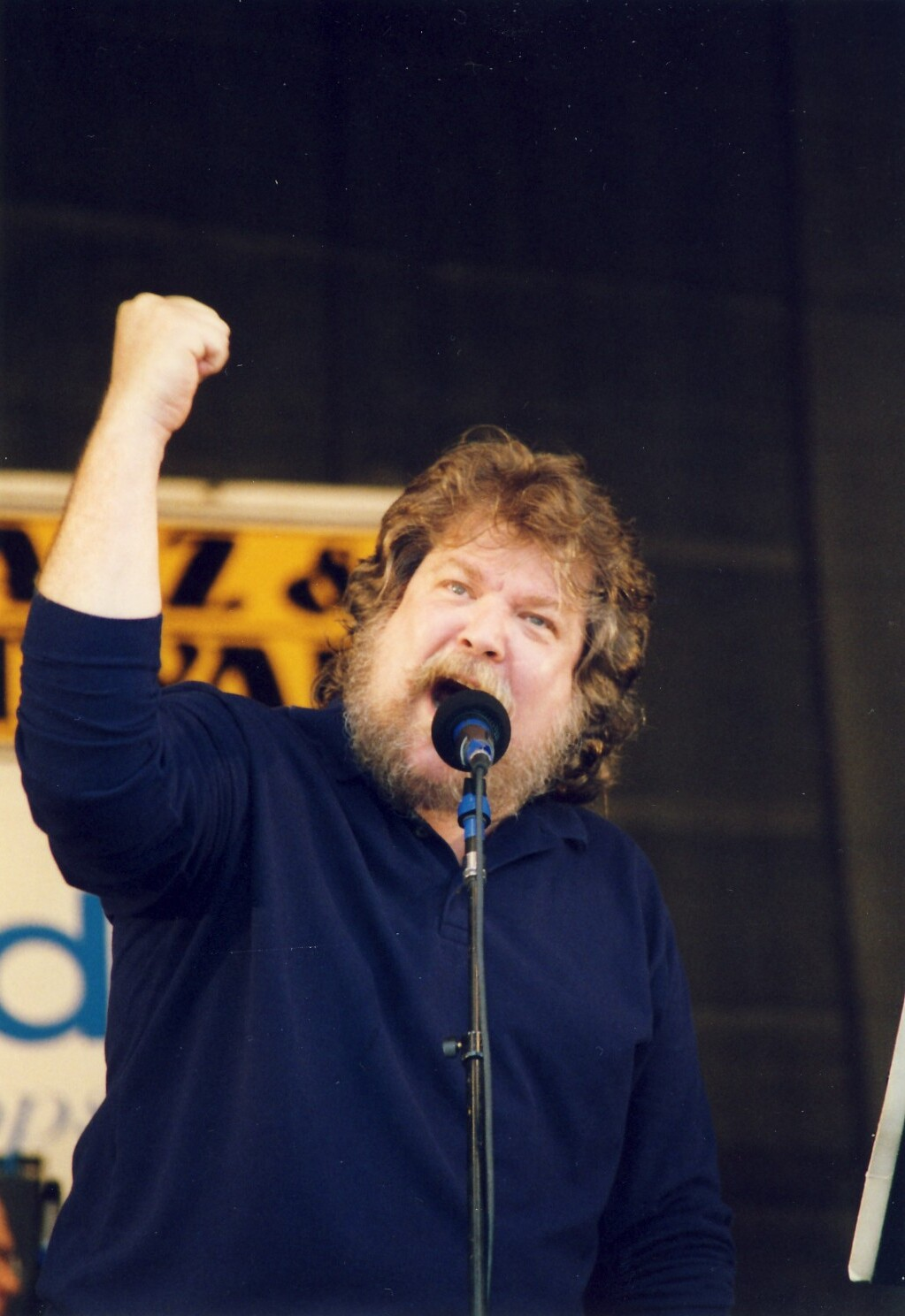
- Kent in 1997

Background information
- Also known as: Big Luther, Duke Royal
- Born: Kent Rowell; June 23, 1948; New Orleans, Louisiana, U.S.
- Died: August 16, 2024 (aged 76)
- Genres: Blues, rhythm and blues, gospel
- Occupation: Singer
- Instrument: Vocals
- Years active: 1962–2024
- Labels: Renegade, Louisiana Red Hot, Vetter Communications
- Website: LutherKent.com

Luther Kent (June 23, 1948 – August 16, 2024) was an American blues singer based in New Orleans, Louisiana. Kent was known for a big soulful voice and his big horn-based group, Luther Kent & Trick Bag, that mixed swinging blues with New Orleans R&B. Towards the end, Kent had a show that came on Saturdays on WBRH called Luther's House Party that is now hosted by his musical friend, Chris Leblanc as it's now called Chris's House Party.

== Biography ==
Luther Kent was born as Kent Rowell in New Orleans, Louisiana, on June 23, 1948. As a vocalist, he was influenced by artists such as Bobby Bland, Etta James, and Ray Charles.

Kent began to sing professionally when he was 14, and his first record was released by Montel Records. In 1970, he became the lead singer for a group named Cold Grits. The group was subsequently signed to Ode Records, but their record was never released. Kent joined Blood, Sweat & Tears in 1974 and toured with them until the end of that same year. However, he never recorded with the group, as he was still bound by contract with Ode Records at the time.

In 1977, Kent released his first solo album, World Class, on RCS Records, produced by Cy Frost at Abbey Road Studios in St. John's Wood, London, and Applewood Studios in Colorado. In 1978, Kent and ex-Wayne Cochran musical director, Charlie Brent, formed Luther Kent & Trick Bag. The band was active during the 1980s and 1990s, and released three CDs under the name.

Kent released a gospel album in 1996 teaming up with John Lee & the Heralds of Christ. The album also featured Allen Toussaint and Pete Fountain. Kent toured Italy in 2006 with Italian blues guitarist Robi Zonca and his band. The show was recorded and released as album Magic Box that year.

Apart from his solo work, Kent also sang as a guest with the traditional jazz group, The Dukes of Dixieland on selected dates. Kent was also on some of their recordings.

Kent also had a brief cameo in the pilot episode of Cop Rock, a short lived police procedural-musical television series that aired for only 11 episodes on ABC in 1990. In his only acting credit, Kent portrayed a corporate lobbyist attempting to bribe the mayor of Los Angeles. He also had a solo in that scene's musical number.

Kent died on August 16, 2024, at the age of 76 due to heart failure.

== Discography ==
- 1977 World Class (Record Company of the South)
- 1987 Luther Kent & Trick Bag / It's in the Bag (Renegade)
- 1987 Luther Kent & Trick Bag / Good News Blues (Renegade)
- 1996 Luther Kent with John Lee & The Heralds of Christ / Gospel & Holiday Spirituals (Renegade)
- 1997 Luther Kent & Trick Bag / Live (Renegade)
- 1999 Down in New Orleans (Louisiana Red Hot)
- 2008 The Bobby Bland Songbook (Vetter Communications)
- 2013 Luther (Atoula Publishing)

=== Other projects ===
- 2004 Forever Fabulous Chickenhawks Showband & All-Star Revue / Deep in the Heart (Louisiana Red Hot)
- 2005 The Dukes of Dixieland / Christmas in New Orleans (Leisure Jazz)
- 2005 The Dukes of Dixieland / Louisiana Legends (Leisure Jazz)
- 2006 The Dukes of Dixieland / New Orleans Mardi Gras (Leisure Jazz)
- 2006 The Dukes of Dixieland / Timeless (Leisure Jazz)
- 2006 Robi Zonca and his band featuring Luther Kent / Magic Box (Mousemen)
