= Together (Johnny and Edgar Winter album) =

Live album by Johnny Winter and Edgar Winter
- Released: July 1976
- Genres: Rock and roll; soul
- Length: 37.16
- Label: Blue Sky
- Producers: Johnny Winter, Edgar Winter

Johnny Winter chronology
Captured Live! (1976)	Together (1976)	Nothin' but the Blues (1977)

Edgar Winter chronology
The Edgar Winter Group with Rick Derringer (1975)	Together (1976)	Recycled (1977)

Together is a live album by brothers Johnny Winter (guitar, vocals) and Edgar Winter (saxophone, vocals). It is composed entirely of rock and roll and soul standards. It was recorded at the Swing Auditorium and the San Diego Sports Arena, and released in 1976.

The musicians on the album include the members of the Edgar Winter Group (Edgar on saxophone, Rick Derringer on guitar, Dan Hartman on piano, and Chuck Ruff on drums) as well as the members of Johnny Winter's band (Johnny and Floyd Radford on guitar, Randy Jo Hobbs on bass, and Richard Hughes on drums).

== Critical reception ==
Professional ratings
Review scores
Source	Rating
Allmusic	4.5/5 stars

On AllMusic, Michael B. Smith said, "Individually, Edgar Winter and his brother Johnny Winter are powerful artists, but combined, they are virtually unstoppable.... From start to finish, Edgar and Johnny are having a rockin' and rollin' good time, and that happiness channels over to the listener."

Goldmine magazine called "Rock & Roll Medley" one of the five must-hear tracks from Edgar Winter, saying "The Winter brothers engage in some soulful harmony lead vocals, and of course Johnny tears out a sizzling guitar solo."

== Track listing ==
Side 1

1. "Harlem Shuffle" (Bob Relf, Earl Nelson) – 3:41
2. "Soul Man" (David Porter, Isaac Hayes) – 2:55
3. "You've Lost That Lovin' Feelin'" (Barry Mann, Cynthia Weil, Phil Spector) – 5:04
4. "Rock & Roll Medley" – 6:17

- "Slippin' and Slidin'" (Richard Penniman, Edwin Bocage, Al Collins, James Smith)
- "Jailhouse Rock" (Jerry Lieber, Mike Stoller)
- "Tutti Frutti" (Richard Penniman, Dorothy LaBostrie)
- "Sick & Tired" (Chris Kenner, Dave Bartholomew)
- "I'm Ready" (Pearl King, Ruth Durand, Joe Robichaux)
- "Reelin' & Rockin'" (Chuck Berry)
- "Blue Suede Shoes" (Carl Perkins)
- "Jenny Take a Ride" (Enotris Johnson, Richard Penniman, Bob Crewe)
- "Good Golly Miss Molly" (Robert Blackwell, John Marascalco)

Side 2

1. "Let the Good Times Roll" (Leonard Lee) – 3:15
2. "Mercy, Mercy" (Don Covay, Ronald Miller) – 3:46
3. "Baby, Whatcha Want Me to Do" (Jimmy Reed) – 11:06

== Personnel ==
Musicians

- Johnny Winter – guitar, lead vocals
- Edgar Winter – saxophone, lead vocals
- Rick Derringer – guitar, background vocals
- Floyd Radford – guitar
- Randy Jo Hobbs – bass
- Dan Hartman – piano, background vocals
- Richard Hughes – drums
- Chuck Ruff – drums

Production

- Recording and mixing: Ray Thompson, Shelly Yakus, Andy Bloch, David Thoerner
- Package design: Paula Scher, John Berg
- Front and back cover photographs: Richard Avedon
