= Tobacco Road (song) =

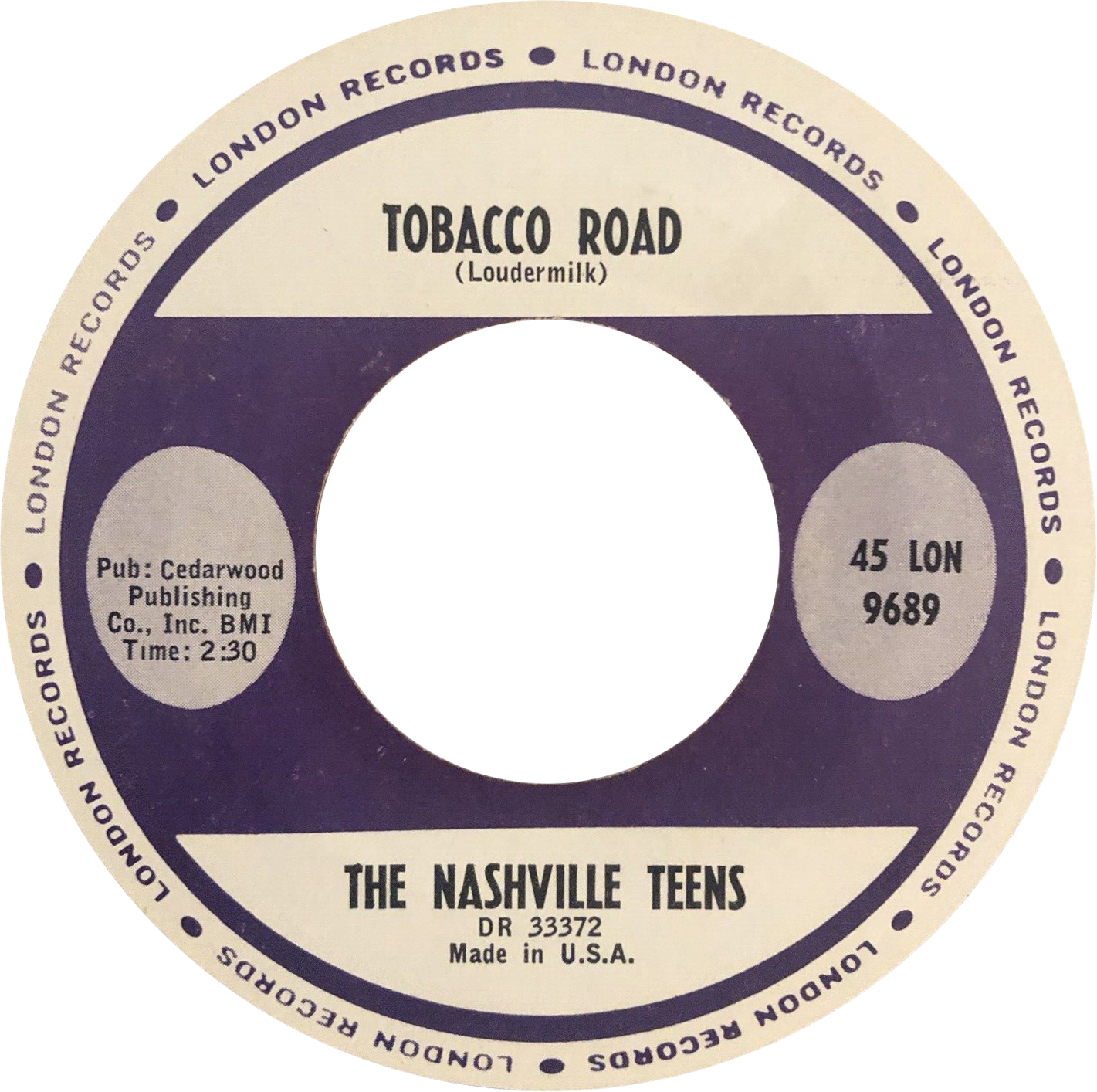
- Side A of the US single

Single by The Nashville Teens

from the album Tobacco Road
- B-side: "I Like It Like That"
- Released: June 26, 1964 (UK); August 1964 (US)
- Recorded: May 1964
- Genre: Garage rock; blues rock
- Length: 2:27
- Label: Decca (UK); London (US)
- Songwriter: John D. Loudermilk
- Producer: Mickie Most

The Nashville Teens singles chronology
"Tobacco Road" (1964)	"Google Eye" (1964)

"Tobacco Road" is a blues song written and first recorded by John D. Loudermilk in December 1959 and released in 1960. This song became a hit for The Nashville Teens in 1964 and has since become a standard across several musical genres.

== Loudermilk original version ==
Originally framed as a folk song, "Tobacco Road" was a semi-autobiographical tale of growing up in Durham, North Carolina. Released on Columbia Records, it was not a hit for Loudermilk, achieving only minor chart success in Australia. Other artists, however, immediately began recording and performing the song.

== Nashville Teens version ==
The English group The Nashville Teens' garage rock/blues rock rendering was a bold effort featuring prominent piano, electric guitar, and bass drum parts and a dual lead vocal. Mickie Most produced it with the same tough-edged-pop feel that he brought to The Animals' hits. "Tobacco Road" was a trans-Atlantic pop hit in 1964, reaching number 6 on the UK singles chart, number 3 in Canada, and number 14 on the U.S. singles chart. While the Teens would have some further success in the UK, in North America "Tobacco Road" became another one-hit wonder of the British Invasion. It reached number 9 on the New Zealand Lever Hit Parade charts

== Other notable versions and uses ==
Lou Rawls recorded the song as a slow blues and released it as a single in 1963, although it did not chart; it also became the title track of his subsequent album.

Jefferson Airplane recorded a version of "Tobacco Road" on their first album, Jefferson Airplane Takes Off, in 1966; it was one of two songs on their first album not written by a member of the band.

Also in 1966, the song was recorded by the Los Angeles band The Leaves on its album Hey Joe, and by the New York band The Blues Magoos on its debut album Psychedelic Lollipop.

British psychedelic band Spooky Tooth recorded a version in 1968 for their debut album, It's All About.

Rare Earth included the song on their 1969 album Get Ready.

American funk rock band War recorded a version with British singer Eric Burdon for their 1970 album Eric Burdon Declares "War". An additional recording appears on their album Love Is All Around, also with Burdon.

The band Jamul reached number 83 in Canada with their version June 6, 1970.

The song appeared on Edgar Winter's debut album Entrance in 1970, and in a 17-minute live version on his 1972 double LP Roadwork.

In the 1970s, songwriters Nicky Chinn and Mike Chapman claimed to have been inspired by "Tobacco Road" while writing The Sweet's "Block Buster!", after accusations of stealing the guitar riff from David Bowie's "Jean Genie".

Dan Seals covered the song in his 1985 album Won't Be Blue Anymore.

Roy Clark included the song on his 1986 album Rockin' in the Country, which peaked at number 56 on the Billboard Hot Country Singles chart.

In 1986, "Tobacco Road" was included on David Lee Roth's Eat 'Em and Smile album, reaching number 10 on the Billboard Rock chart.

In 2017 Suzi Quatro, Don Powell and Andy Scott released a version on their album Quatro, Scott & Powell.

In 2025, Richard Thompson and Hugh Cornwell (who were in the same school band) released a version to raise money for the charity Cure Parkinson's.
