= Shock Treatment (Edgar Winter album) =

Studio album by Edgar Winter Group
- Released: May 1974
- Studios: Record Plant, New York City, USA
- Length: 40:25
- Label: Epic
- Producer: Rick Derringer

Edgar Winter Group chronology
They Only Come Out at Night (1972)	Shock Treatment (1974)	Jasmine Nightdreams (1975)

Singles from Shock Treatment
- 1. "River's Risin'" Released: June 18, 1974; 2. "Easy Street" Released: September 1974; 3. "Someone Take My Heart Away" Released: December 1974

Professional ratings
Review scores
Source	Rating
AllMusic	3.5/5 stars
Christgau's Record Guide	C+

Shock Treatment is the fourth studio album by Edgar Winter and the second by the Edgar Winter Group. The album went to No. 13 on the Billboard Pop Albums chart, and had two charting singles: "Easy Street" (No. 83 Pop Singles) and "River's Risin'" (No. 33 Pop Singles). The album was certified gold July 18, 1974, by the RIAA. In Canada, the album reached No. 9 (2 weeks) and was No. 69 in the year end chart.

== Track listing ==
All tracks written by Dan Hartman, except where noted.

No.	Title	Writer(s)	Length
1.	"Some Kinda Animal"		3:05
2.	"Easy Street"		4:13
3.	"Sundown"		3:25
4.	"Miracle of Love"	Edgar Winter, Hartman	3:38
5.	"Do Like Me"	Winter	4:48
6.	"Rock & Roll Woman"		2:49
7.	"Someone Take My Heart Away"	Winter	4:08
8.	"Queen of My Dreams"		2:15
9.	"Maybe Some Day You'll Call My Name"		3:52
10.	"River's Risin'"		3:19
11.	"Animal"	Winter	4:53

== Personnel ==
- Edgar Winter — clavinet (tracks 1, 3, 4, 6, 7, 9–11), lead vocals (tracks 2, 4, 5, 7, 11), backing vocals (tracks 4–6, 10, 11), piano (tracks 2, 9, 10), ARP bass (tracks 2, 5, 8), saxophone (track 2), Mellotron (tracks 3, 7, 10), ARP synthesizer (tracks 4, 11), vibraphone (track 4), organ (track 5)
- Rick Derringer — lead guitar (tracks 1, 3–7, 9, 10, 11), backing vocals (tracks 5, 6, 10, 11), electric sitar (track 1), bass (track 3), rhythm guitar (track 10), slide guitar (track 10)
- Dan Hartman — bass (tracks 1, 2, 4, 6, 7, 9–11), lead vocals (tracks 1, 3, 6, 8–10), backing vocals (tracks 5, 6, 9–11), rhythm guitar (tracks 1, 3), acoustic guitar (tracks 3, 10), castanets (track 3), all guitars (track 8), autoharp (track 11)
- Chuck Ruff — drums; small frequency oscillator (track 11)

Technical

- Teresa Alfieri - design
- Vic Anesini - mastering
- Jimmy Iovine - assistant engineer
- Bill King - photography
- Lou Schlossberg - assistant engineer
- Shelly Yakus - engineer
- Lehman Yates - assistant engineer

== Charts ==
Chart (1974)	Peak position
Canada Top Albums/CDs (RPM)	9
US Billboard 200	13

== Certifications ==
Region	Certification	Certified units/sales
United States (RIAA)	Gold	500,000^{^}
^{^} Shipments figures based on certification alone.
