= Rebel Road =

Studio album by Edgar Winter
- Released: July 8, 2008
- Genre: Rock
- Length: 46:08
- Label: Airline
- Producer: Edgar Winter and Curt Cuomo

Edgar Winter chronology
Jazzin the Blues (2004)	Rebel Road (2008)

Professional ratings
Review scores
Source	Rating
Allmusic	3.5/5 stars

Rebel Road is the tenth solo album by vocalist/keyboardist/saxophonist Edgar Winter. It was released on July 8, 2008 by Airline Records. The album features lead and solo guitar work by Slash on the single "Rebel Road", vocals and harmonica by Clint Black on "The Power of Positive Drinking" and "On the Horns of a Dilemma", and lead and solo guitar by Edgar's brother Johnny Winter on "Rockin' the Blues". Winter dedicated "The Closer I Get" to his wife, Monique Winter, and "Peace and Love" to Ringo Starr.

== Track listing ==
All songs written by Edgar Winter, Curt Cuomo & James Zota Baker; except "Rebel Road" (Edgar Winter, Curt Cuomo, James Zota Baker, Jake Hooker), "The Closer I Get" (Edgar Winter) and "Texas Tornado" (Edgar Winter)

1. "Rebel Road" (with Slash) – 4:12
2. "Eye on You" – 3:49
3. "The Power of Positive Drinkin'" (with Clint Black) – 3:47
4. "Freedom" – 3:57
5. "Rockin' the Blues" (with Johnny Winter) – 5:01
6. "The Closer I Get" – 4:39
7. "I'd Do It Again" – 4:31
8. "Texas Tornado" – 4:50
9. "Peace and Love" – 4:47
10. "On the Horns of a Dilemma" (with Clint Black) – 3:13
11. "Oh No No" – 3:40

== Personnel ==
- Edgar Winter : vocals, saxophone, piano, organ, synthesizer and percussion
- Curt Cuomo : vocals, drums
- James Zota Baker : guitar, vocals
- Doug Rappoport : guitar, vocals
- Dean Parks : acoustic guitar
- Koko Powell : bass, vocals
- Mark Meadows : bass
- Dave Carpenter : bass
- Matt Bissonette : bass
- Abe Laboriel Jr. : drums
- Matt Laug : drums
- Gary Novak : drums
- Pete Maloney : drums
- Jimmy Paxson : drums
- Cameron Stone : Cello

== Special guests ==
- Slash : guitar solo on Rebel Road
- Clint Black : vocals and harmonica on The Power of Positive Drinking and On the Horns of a Dilemma
- Johnny Winter : lead and solo guitar on Rockin' the Blues

== Technical staff ==
- Ross Hogarth – Engineer/Mixer
- Rob Jacobs – Engineer/Mixer
- Erik Ron – Engineer/Vocals
