= Flipside (Canadian TV program) =

- Presented by: Jim McKenna
- Country of origin: Canada
- Original language: English
- No. of seasons: 1

Production
- Producer: Jim McKenna

Original release
- Network: CBC Television
- Release: 29 June – 14 September 1974

Flipside is a Canadian music journalism television program that aired on CBC Television in 1974.

== Premise ==
Jim McKenna produced and hosted Flipside, a Montreal-produced program concerning the music industry in Canada. Visiting artists performed on the program and were interviewed by McKenna. Guests included Jim Kale (The Guess Who), The Stampeders. Murray McLauchlan, a winner at the 1974 Juno Awards, was featured in a filmed report. The Ville Emard Blues Band was the subject of another filmed feature.

== Scheduling ==
The half-hour program was broadcast on Saturdays at 6:30 p.m. (Eastern) from 29 June to 14 September 1974.
