= Free Ride (song) =

1973 single by Edgar Winter

Single by Edgar Winter Group

from the album They Only Come Out at Night
- B-side: "When It Comes"
- Released: August 1973
- Recorded: 1972
- Genre: Rock
- Length: 3:08
- Label: Epic
- Songwriter: Dan Hartman
- Producer: Rick Derringer

Edgar Winter Group singles chronology
"Frankenstein" (1973)	"Free Ride" (1973)	"Hangin' Around" (1973)

Audio
- "Free Ride" on YouTube

"Free Ride" is a song written by Dan Hartman and performed by the Edgar Winter Group from their 1972 album They Only Come Out at Night, produced by Rick Derringer. The single was a top-15 U.S. hit in 1973, reaching number 14 on the Billboard Hot 100 and number 10 on Cash Box. In Canada, it peaked at number eight.

There appears to be two separate versions of the song. The album version, released in November 1972, where Ronnie Montrose is listed as lead guitar, clocks in at 3:08. According to drummer Chuck Ruff, “Ronnie Montrose left the band because he and Steve Paul (their manager) did not get along at all. They were gonna call a big meeting and fire him. I told Ronnie, so before they could do that he quit.” Many have noted that the 3:05‑long single released in August 1973 sounds different, with a mid‑song guitar solo of a different tone. Ruff later stated, “We actually did re‑record ‘Free Ride’ two or three times with Rick Derringer and Jerry Weems.”

== Personnel ==
- Edgar Winter – clavinet, electric piano, ARP 2600 synthesizer, backing vocals
- Ronnie Montrose – lead guitar, backing vocals (1958 Gibson Les Paul Standard)
- Dan Hartman – lead vocals, rhythm guitar, percussion
- Rick Derringer – rhythm guitar, backing vocals, producer
- Randy Jo Hobbs – bass guitar
- Johnny Badanjek – drums

== Other versions ==
Tavares recorded a version of the song for their 1975 album, In the City. Their version peaked at number 52 on the Billboard Hot 100 and number eight on the Hot Soul Singles chart. Hartman himself re-recorded the song and released it on his 1979 album Relight My Fire. Audio Adrenaline recorded the song and released it on their 1996 album Bloom. When The Cats Away recorded a version and was released in January 1990 and peaked at number 12.

== Charts ==
=== Weekly charts ===
Edgar Winter Group

Chart (1973)	Peak position
Australia (Kent Music Report)	84
Canada 100 (RPM)	8
US Billboard Hot 100	14
US Cash Box Top 100	10

Tavares

Chart (1975–76)	Peak position
Canada RPM Top Singles	71
US Billboard Hot 100	52
US Billboard R&B	8
US Cash Box Top 100	56

=== Year-end charts ===
Chart (1973)	Rank
Canada	109
US (Joel Whitburn's Pop Annual)	115
US Cash Box Top 100	65

== In popular culture ==
The song has been featured in several films, including Air America, Dazed and Confused, and Mighty Morphin Power Rangers: The Movie, the latter of which features Hartman's recording on its soundtrack album. The song also appeared in The Drew Carey Show episode "The Dog and Pony Show". In addition to film and television, the song has also been included in several video game soundtracks such as in the video game tie-in for the 2006 film Cars. The song was also included on Grand Theft Auto IV: The Lost and Damned, on the in-game radio station Liberty Rock Radio, and on MLB 11: The Show. In other media, the song is also used in the Disney California Adventure ride, Guardians of the Galaxy - Mission: Breakout! It was also sampled on the Girl Talk mash-up album Feed the Animals.
