= The Boogie Kings =

American Cajun swamp pop and blue-eyed soul group

The Boogie Kings (also known as The Fabulous Boogie Kings) are an American Cajun swamp pop and blue-eyed soul group.

== History ==
The band formed in Eunice, Louisiana in 1955 consisting of teenaged members Doug Ardoin, Skip Morris, Bert Miller and Harris Miller.

In the mid-1960s, the band expanded to include Ned Theall, a trumpeter from Abbeville, who became the group's leader. Because of Theall, and his musical arrangement skills, the band changed its style of music from swamp pop, to a more successful, blue-eyed soul sound of music.

In early 1965, the band released its first self-titled album on the Jin label and recorded at Floyd Soileau's studio in Ville Platte, Louisiana. During this time, the band was provided leadership from front man Clint West (born Clinton Joseph Guillory in Ville Platte on August 11, 1938). West booked the Boogie Kings in venues outside the Evangeline Parish and Acadiana area. West's vocals on songs such as "Try Me" and "Big Blue Diamonds" provided success for the Boogie Kings. The band later separated from its front man, Clint West, who then led his own version of the Boogie Kings, called "The Fabulous Kings". West has received several Hall of Fame Honors for his musical talents. West died on June 28, 2016, at St. Landry Extended Care Hospital in Opelousas, Louisiana.

The band began to feature trumpeter G.G. Shinn on vocals, who had previously been only an occasional vocalist. By May 1965, Jerry LaCroix, (performing under the name Jerry "Count" Jackson) joined the group.

A new album was recorded in New Orleans at Cosimo Matassa's studio under the production of Baton Rouge's Sam Montel, which was released in the late summer of 1965. This combined with a hitherto unseen stage performance not generally seen in southern Louisiana and Southeast Texas gave the band a stature and popularity new to the region.

In the winter-spring of 1966, the band traveled to Las Vegas in an attempt to break out. Hoping that the release of a 45 rpm by Houston's Huey Meaux ("That's Blue Eyed Soul", backed with "Do 'em All", recorded at his Pasadena, Texas studio) would launch them to success, this tour was not the success hoped for. The band returned to Louisiana in June 1966.

The Las Vegas exposure taught the band much about presentation and performance. However, friction involving G.G. Shinn led to his separation from the band in the summer of 1966, to be replaced by Duane Yates, formerly of the Capris.

Meanwhile, lawsuits were settled that resulted in the prohibition of Clint West using the name "Boogie Kings", though he had earlier released an album on Soileau's Jin label, Live at the Purple Peacock.

To integrate Duane into the band and present him to the band's followers, a new album was recorded at Sam Montel's Baton Rouge studio entitled Blue Eyed Soul. This was released in the fall of 1966. Although consisting mostly of cover material, the album featured a single, "Philly Walk", written by Ned Theall, which achieved respectable regional success, no mean thing in the face of the so-called "British Invasion." At this time in the South, the Music Business was a little behind the rest of the U.S.and Montel Records achieved success with "regional distribution" rather than National Distribution. Many songs were "territorial hits", usually 100 mile radius of the producing company. Montel's success was that from Houston to New Orleans and everything in the south Louisiana corridor. This was usually a test area for music on Montel and some other southern labels/producers and sometimes the record releases would be a giant hit in these areas but have no more sales potential outside because of the limited distribution/exposure of the record label.

Though mostly covers, the performances recorded did not come across as token album filler, but genuine interpretations of the material by the band. The personnel - Jerry Lacroix (vocals and sax), Duane Yates (vocals and trumpet), Ned Theall (trumpet), Norris Badeaux (lead sax), Dale Gothia (sax), Dan Silas (baritone sax), Bryan Leger (organ), Jack Hall (guitar), Gary Dorsey (bass), and Kenny Yetman (drums) – are considered by many who have known the band since inception to be the definitive Boogie Kings personnel. This roster constituted the group in its most unchanged form in the years that the band made several recordings, as well as the faces the public saw during the years of its expanding popularity from public appearances. In the Spring of 1967, Gary Walker was introduced into the group, and the three singers performed as "The Three Kings".

Jerry laCroix left the band in May 1967, though any void in the act was filled by Gary Walker. A live album had been recorded at Galveston's Bamboo Hut but, by the time this was released, Jerry was briefly with the Soul Counts, before joining G.G.'s "Rollercoasters."

The band toured throughout the United States and helped back big-name musicians on the stage and in the recording studio. The Boogie Kings, organized as loose co-operative, voted to replace Ned Theall while in Los Angeles in 1967. The band returned to Louisiana, and selected Jack Hall as leader. Ned organized a group featuring Duane Yates on vocals, Jon Smith on sax, and Bobby Ramirez on drums. In 1968, Ned Theall took back The Boogie Kings, and the band continued to play in Louisiana and southeast Texas.

By 1968, the band started going through a succession of vocalists, most of them very talented in their own right, though the stage excitement wrought by Clint West, G.G. Shinn, Jerry LaCroix, and Duane Yates was seldom recaptured. These vocalists included Rosemary Clark, Buddy Wright, Little Alfred Babineaux, James Anderson, and Johnny Giordano, to name just a few. Turnover among the sidemen began to accelerate as well. By the end of 1969, only Jack Hall and Dan Silas remained from the group's heyday.

The group called it quits in 1972–73. The first of many "reunions", organized by Theall, began in 1974 at the Texas Pelican Club between Lake Charles, Louisiana and Orange, Texas, setting the style for various reunions over the subsequent years. They reformed in 1975 and 1982. In the late 1980s, the band released "Cajun Soul" in 1988 and "Nine Lives" in 1989. After that recording, the band disbanded. They reunited in 1991 and went back to recording swamp pop music. The band released three albums in the 1990s and another in 2007. Yet another has yet still to be released and was recorded in 2008.

The man who had been the band's leader and driving force for so many years, Ned Theall, suddenly died on January 8, 2010. As would be expected, there was some question as to whether the band could or would survive.

On May 16, 2010, at the LMHOF Louisiana Music Homecoming held in Erwinville, Louisiana, the Boogie Kings, and Ned Theall himself, were inducted into The Louisiana Music Hall Of Fame, honoring their 55 years of excellence and crowd pleasing music.

== Recordings ==
All in all, The Boogie Kings have released twelve studio albums, three compilations and a double compilation album, including an upcoming studio album yet to be released. All albums were (and still are) recorded on Jin Records. The Boogie Kings have proven to be one of the most enduring bands of all time, having performed for over 55 years, thanks to Ned Theall's refusal to let this legendary band fade into obscurity. Ned Theall died on January 8, 2010. The latest Boogie Kings album, LEGACY, was released in February, 2016. This album was recorded in 2009, with Ned Theall leading the band and featuring Parker James and Greg Martinez on vocals. This album has eleven blue-eyed soul songs.

== Members ==
The Boogie Kings have had different members throughout the decades. Names such as Doug Ardoin, Skip Morris, Norris Badeaux, Bryan Leger, Mike Pollard, Ned Theall, Dan Silas, Duane Yates, G.G. Shin, Tommy Joe Richard, Christian Romero, Jerry "Count Jackson" Lacroix, Jon Smith, Bert and Harris Miller, Gary Walker, Willie Tee Trahan, Jerry Henderson, Tommie Joe Richard, Nick Farkas, Sed Sedlak, Gregg Martinez, Ted Broussard, Allen Wayne, Clint West, Ronnie Crowley, Alex Melton, David Hyde, Tommy "Bubba" Robin, Steve Morrow, Bubba Boudreaux, Shayne Whitmore, Mike Ritter, and Jeffrey J Fournet, Paul and Tony Field, Dale Gothia, Gary Dorsey, and Glen Guilbeau.
