= Entrance (album) =

Studio album by Edgar Winter
- Released: 1970
- Genre: Blues rock; jazz rock; rock and roll; progressive rock
- Length: 48:07
- Label: Epic
- Producer: Edgar Winter

Edgar Winter chronology
Entrance (1970)	Edgar Winter's White Trash (1971)

Professional ratings
Review scores
Source	Rating
AllMusic	4.5/5 stars
Christgau's Record Guide	C
The Village Voice	D

Entrance is the first studio album by Edgar Winter. His brother is the guitarist Johnny Winter, who co-wrote most of the material and who is featured on "Tobacco Road".

== Track listing ==
All tracks are written by Edgar Winter and Johnny Winter, except where noted.

No.	Title	Writer(s)	Length
1.	"Entrance"		3:31
2.	"Where Have You Gone"		2:39
3.	"Rise to Fall"		4:04
4.	"Fire and Ice"		6:52
5.	"Hung Up"		3:14
6.	"Back in the Blues"	Edgar Winter	2:17
7.	"Re-Entrance"		2:29
8.	"Tobacco Road"	John D. Loudermilk	4:10
9.	"Jump Right Out"		4:22
10.	"Peace Pipe"	E. Winter	4:42
11.	"A Different Game"		5:04
12.	"Jimmy's Gospel"	E. Winter	4:43

== Personnel ==
- Edgar Winter - vocals, organ, alto saxophone, piano, celeste
- Randal Dollahon - guitar
- Gene Kurtz - bass
- Jimmy Gillen - drums
- Ray Alonge, Earl Chapin, Brooks Tillotson - horns
- Paul Gershman, Emanuel Green, Gene Cahn, Ralph Oxman, Russ Savakus - strings
- Johnny Winter - guitar, harmonica, vocals on "Tobacco Road"
- Tommy Shannon - bass on "Tobacco Road"
- "Uncle" John Turner - drums on "Tobacco Road"

Technical

- Roy Segal, Stu Romain - engineer
- Steve Paul - organic director
- Richard Mantel - cover design
- Shepard Sherbell - photography

== Charts ==
Chart (1970)	Peak position
US Billboard 200	196
