= Edgar Winter's White Trash (album) =

Studio album by Edgar Winter's White Trash
- Released: 1971
- Genres: Rock and roll; boogie-woogie; blues; funk; R&B
- Length: 43:28
- Label: Epic
- Producer: Rick Derringer

Edgar Winter's White Trash chronology
Entrance (1970)	Edgar Winter's White Trash (1971)	Roadwork (1972)

Edgar Winter's White Trash is the second studio album by Edgar Winter, and his first with his group White Trash. The album reached #111 on the Billboard charts, and produced the single "Keep Playin' That Rock 'n' Roll", which went to #70 on Billboard's Top 100. The album was prepped for quadraphonic sound, but was left unreleased in this format. The album was produced by Rick Derringer. In Canada, the album reached #82. The track "Dying to Live" is sampled in 2Pac's posthumous release Runnin' (Dying to Live).

Guitar is played principally by Derringer, but Winter's older brother Johnny also plays on the track "I've Got News for You".

Professional ratings
Review scores
Source	Rating
Allmusic	4.5/5 stars
Christgau's Record Guide	C
Rolling Stone	
Circus	

== Reception ==
Reviewing the album for AllMusic, by Michael B. Smith said:

Perhaps one of his best-loved albums, Edgar Winter's White Trash combined funk, blues, R&B, and rock & roll to create one of the freshest sounds of the early '70s. Touching on gospel with "Fly Away" and "Save the Planet," Winter and his band cover all the bases, climbing into the lower end of the Top 40 with "Keep Playin' That Rock and Roll." Winter's hauntingly beautiful "Dying to Live," featuring some of his best piano work, serves as a valid anti-war statement, written at the height of the Vietnam era, and the remainder of the record is filled with genuine rock & roll/boogie-woogie/blues that will keep your head bobbing and your toes tapping.

== Track listing ==
No.	Title	Writer(s)	Length
1.	"Give It Everything You Got"	Jerry LaCroix, Edgar Winter	4:33
2.	"Fly Away"	LaCroix, E. Winter	3:02
3.	"Where Would I Be"	LaCroix, E. Winter	3:59
4.	"Let's Get It On"	LaCroix, E. Winter	5:05
5.	"I've Got News for You" (guitar: Johnny Winter)	Roy Alfred	3:56
6.	"Save the Planet"	LaCroix, E. Winter	5:41
7.	"Dying to Live"	E. Winter	4:04
8.	"Keep Playin' That Rock 'n' Roll" (guitar: Rick Derringer)	E. Winter	3:46
9.	"You Were My Light"	E. Winter	5:02
10.	"Good Morning Music" (guitar solo: Rick Derringer)	LaCroix, E. Winter	4:20

== Personnel ==
=== Musicians ===
- Edgar Winter – organ, piano, celeste, alto saxophone, lead vocals
- Jerry LaCroix – tenor saxophone, harmonica, lead vocals
- Jon Smith – tenor saxophone, vocals
- Tilly Lawrence – lead trumpet, vocals
- Mike McLellan – trumpet, vocals
- Floyd Radford – guitar
- George Sheck – bass guitar
- Bobby Ramirez – drums
- Ray Barretto – congas
- Johnny Winter – guitar, harmonica, vocals
- Rick Derringer – guitar, vocals, producer
- Steven Paul – organic director
- Patti Smith – poetry
- Gene Orloff – strings
- Emanuel Green – strings
- Alfred Brown – strings
- Selwart Richard Clark – strings
- Arnold Eidus – strings
- Max Pollikoff – strings
- Russell Savkas – strings
- George Ricci – strings
- Tasha Thomas – vocals
- Janice Bell – vocals
- Carl Hull – vocals
- Maretha Stewart – vocals
- Albertine Robinson – vocals
- Eileen Gilbert – vocals

=== Technical ===
- Lou Waxman – engineer
- Peter Weiss – engineer
- Richard Mantel – design
- Alen MacWeeney – photography
- Robert Honablue – mastering

== Charts ==
Chart (1971)	Peak position
Canada Top Albums/CDs (RPM)	82
US Billboard 200	111
