= Edgar Winter =

American musician (born 1946)

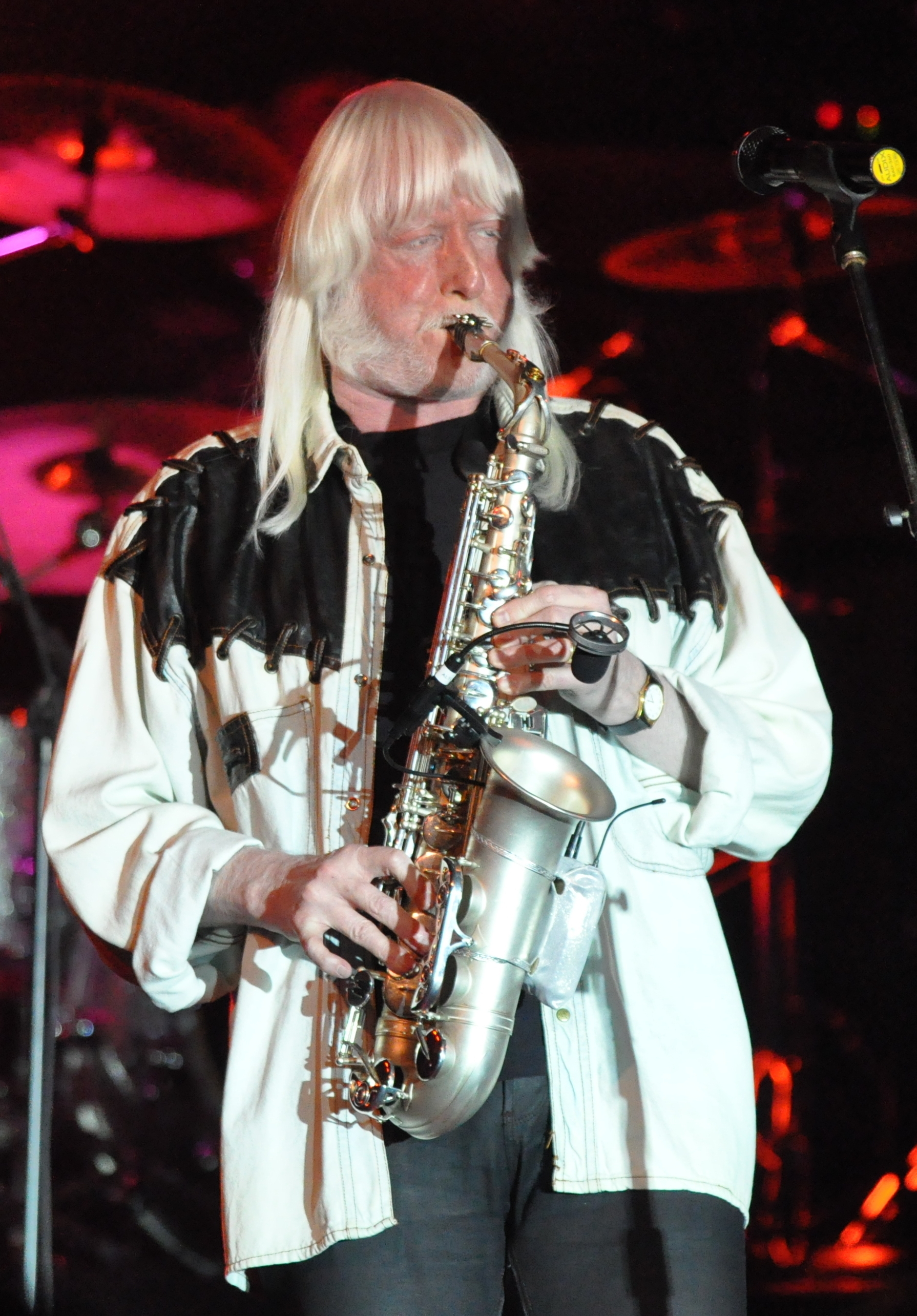
- Winter performing in 2009

Background information
- Born: Edgar Holland Winter; December 28, 1946 (age 79); Beaumont, Texas, U.S.
- Genres: Pop rock; blues rock; jazz fusion; hard rock; Southern rock; blue-eyed soul; boogie rock
- Occupations: Musician; songwriter; singer; record producer
- Instruments: Vocals; keyboards; saxophone; percussion
- Years active: 1969–present
- Labels: Epic; Airline
- Formerly of: The Edgar Winter Group; Sawbuck; Edgar Winter's White Trash; David Lee Roth; Ringo Starr & His All-Starr Band
- Website: edgarwinter.com

Edgar Holland Winter (born December 28, 1946) is an American multi-instrumentalist, working as a vocalist along with playing keyboards, saxophone, and percussion. His success peaked in the 1970s with his band the Edgar Winter Group and their popular songs "Frankenstein" and "Free Ride" which remain staple tracks of classic rock radio. He is the brother of blues singer and guitarist Johnny Winter, who died in 2014.

== Early life ==
Winter was born to John Winter II and Edwina Winter on December 28, 1946, in Beaumont, Texas. Both he and his elder brother Johnny were born with albinism. By the time he left the family home, Winter had mastered numerous instruments and reading and writing music.

== Career ==
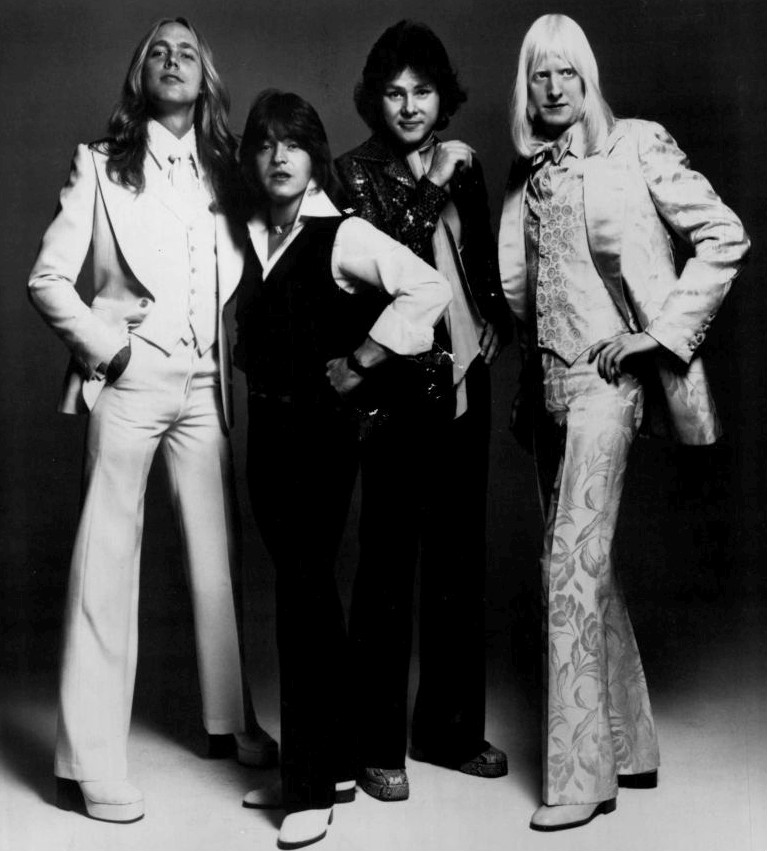
The Edgar Winter Group, Oct.1, 1975- L to R: Chuck Ruff, Rick Derringer, Dan Hartman, Edgar Winter.

Winter composed and performed songs of numerous genres, including rock, jazz, blues, and pop. His critically acclaimed 1970 debut release, Entrance, was first to demonstrate his unique style of genre-blending musicianship. His early recording of "Tobacco Road" gained attention. Edgar followed Entrance with two hit albums backed by his group White Trash, a group originally composed of musicians from Texas and Louisiana. White Trash, with Winter and Jerry Lacroix both on lead vocals and sax, released the studio album Edgar Winter's White Trash, in 1971. It reached No. 111 on the charts, and 1972's follow-up album (partially recorded at New York's Apollo Theater) Roadwork achieved gold status.

In late 1972, Winter brought together Dan Hartman, Ronnie Montrose and Chuck Ruff to form The Edgar Winter Group, who created such hits as the number one "Frankenstein" and "Free Ride" (with lead vocals by its writer Hartman). Released in November 1972, They Only Come Out at Night, peaked at the number 3 position on the Billboard Hot 200 and stayed on the charts for 80 weeks. It was certified gold in April 1973 by the RIAA, and double platinum in November 1986.

Winter invented the keyboard body strap early in his career, an innovation that allows him the freedom to move around on stage during his multi-instrument high-energy performances.

After They Only Come Out at Night, Winter released Shock Treatment, featuring guitarist Rick Derringer in place of Ronnie Montrose. That album contained Winter's third and final Top 40 single "River's Risin'", again sung by Hartman. Later albums included Jasmine Nightdreams, The Edgar Winter Group with Rick Derringer, Together, Recycled, a reunion with White Trash, Standing on Rock, Mission Earth, Live in Japan, Not a Kid Anymore, The Real Deal, Winter Blues and Rebel Road.

Winter also kept busy doing session work, playing saxophone on Meat Loaf's "All Revved Up with No Place to Go", Dan Hartman's solo hit "Instant Replay", Tina Turner's "Simply the Best" and David Lee Roth's remake of "Just a Gigolo", as well as appearing on material by Rick Derringer, Johnny Winter, Ronnie Montrose, Todd Rundgren, Michael McDonald and many others.

Major national television and radio campaigns have used Winter's music to advertise their products. Winter has also made frequent television appearances, both to promote his music and to give his opinions, on shows such as Politically Incorrect. Winter also starred with George Hamilton in a commercial for Miller Lite beer. He appeared in the film Netherworld and the TV shows The Cape, Mysterious Ways, Late Show with David Letterman, and Jimmy Kimmel Live!.

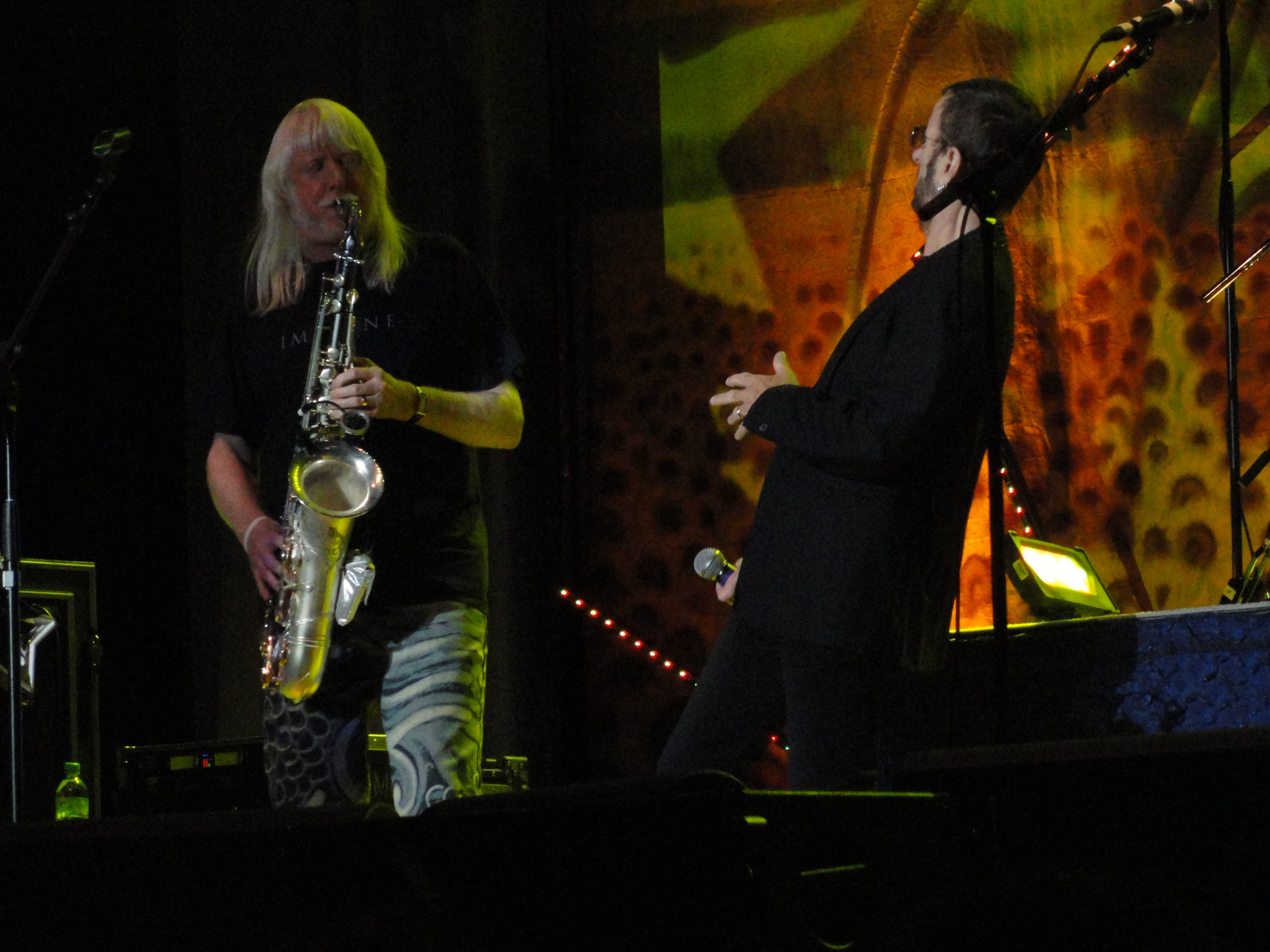
Edgar Winter with Ringo Starr in 2011

Winter's music has been used in many film and television projects, including Netherworld, Air America, Dazed and Confused, My Cousin Vinny, Encino Man, Son in Law, What's Love Got to Do with It, Wayne's World 2, Starkid, Wag the Dog, Knockabout Guys, Duets, Radio, The Simpsons, Queer as Folk, and Tupac: Resurrection.

Tupac: Resurrection, a biography of rapper Tupac Shakur, produced and co-written by Eminem, sampled Winter's song "Dying to Live" as "Runnin' (Dying to Live)," incorporating vocals by the Notorious B.I.G., Tupac, and Winter himself. "Runnin'" peaked at number 5 on the Hot R&B/Hip Hop Singles Sales chart and the soundtrack was No. 1 for 8 consecutive weeks. Blues performer Jonny Lang also covered "Dying to Live" around this time. Winter performed the song solo at the piano on Jimmy Kimmel Live!

Winter's 2003 CD and DVD titled Live at the Galaxy was recorded live at the Galaxy Theatre for Classic Pictures. It features the songs, "Keep Playing That Rock and Roll", "Turn on Your Love Light", "Free Ride", "Texas", "Show Your Love", "New Orleans", "Frankenstein" and "Tobacco Road". In addition, the DVD includes a 30-minute documentary, Edgar Winter: The Man and His Music.

Winter also played with Ringo Starr in the ninth (2006), tenth (2008), eleventh (2010-2011) and fifteenth (2022-) iterations of his All-Starr Band. The band's 2010–11 tour featured the reunion of Winter and Rick Derringer. From August to early-September 2017, The Edgar Winter Band toured as the opening act for both Deep Purple and Alice Cooper as they performed several North American tour dates as part of The Long Goodbye Tour.

In 2017, Cherry Red released a remastered four-CD compilation of all of the Edgar Winter solo albums from 1970 until 1980, entitled Tell Me in a Whisper: The Solo Albums 1970–1980. In 2018, Cherry Red also released a remastered six-CD compilation of Winter's White Trash band and the Edgar Winter Group band albums entitled I've Got News for You: Featuring the Edgar Winter Group & Edgar Winter's White Trash 1971–1977.

=== Mission Earth ===
Winter also produced, arranged, and performed on the 1986 album Mission Earth. This album's lyrics and music were written by Scientology founder L. Ron Hubbard. Hubbard is said to have left detailed instructions and audio tapes for the musicians and producers to follow when making the album. Winter described Mission Earth as "both a return to rock's primal roots and yet highly experimental." Winter wrote, "Ron's technical insight of the recording process was outstanding." Winter also described Hubbard's delineation of counter-rhythm in rock as something "which was nothing short of phenomenal, particularly in as much as it had then been entirely unexplored and only later heard in the African-based rhythms of Paul Simon's work, some five years after Ron's analysis."

== Personal life ==
Winter and his wife, Monique, live in Beverly Hills, California. The couple have no children. Winter stated in an interview: "I can see how that would be a wonderful rewarding thing, but I think there are enough people in the world" and that "it might have been more problematical if I had children with a career and all of it. I tour all the time. If I were to have children, I would want to be home all the time." He is a Scientologist.

== Discography ==
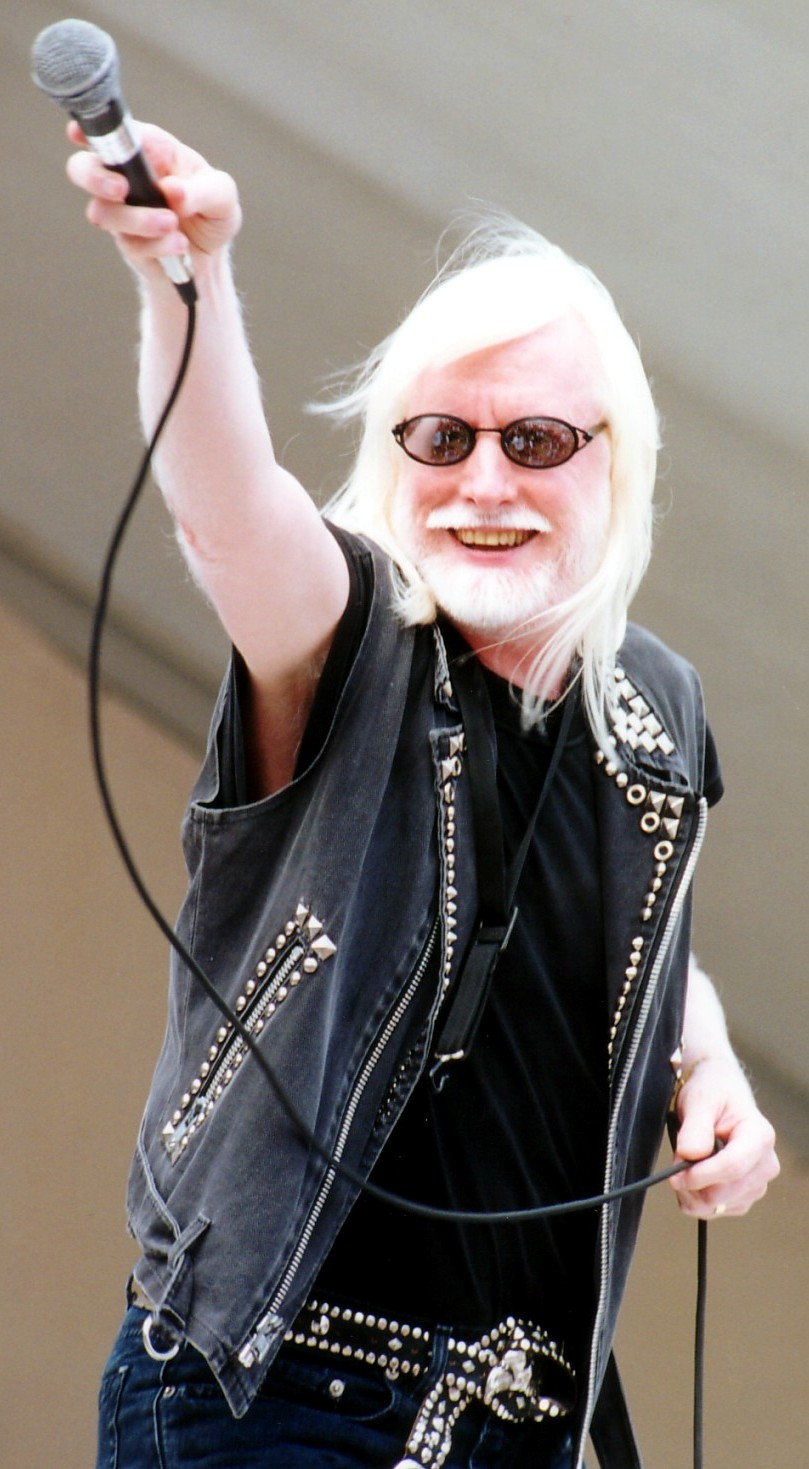
Winter in 2006

=== Solo albums ===
Year	Name	US Top 200
1970	Entrance	196
1975	Jasmine Nightdreams	69
1979	The Edgar Winter Album	–
1981	Standing on Rock	–
1989	Mission Earth	–
1994	Not a Kid Anymore	–
1996	The Real Deal	–
1999	Winter Blues	–
2003	Live at the Galaxy	–
2004	Jazzin' the Blues	–
2008	Rebel Road	–
2022	Brother Johnny	–
"–" denotes releases that did not chart.

=== Edgar Winter's White Trash albums ===
Year	Name	Peak chart positions		Notes
Year	Name	US Top 200	Can Top 100	Notes
1971	Edgar Winter's White Trash	111	82	
1972	Roadwork	23	–	US: Gold
1977	Recycled	–	–	
"–" denotes releases that did not chart.

=== Edgar Winter Group albums ===
Year	Name	Peak chart positions			Notes
Year	Name	US Top 200	AUS	Can Top 100	Notes
1972	They Only Come Out at Night	3	28	4	US: 2× Platinum; MC: 2× Platinum
1974	Shock Treatment	13	–	9	US: Gold No. 69 Can Year End
1975	The Edgar Winter Group with Rick Derringer	124	–	–	
"–" denotes releases that did not chart.

=== Edgar Winter compilation albums ===
Year	Name	Peak chart positions			Notes
Year	Name	US Top 200	AUS	Can Top 100	Notes
1989	The Edgar Winter Collection	–	–	–	
2002	The Best of Edgar Winter	–	–	–	
2014	Playlist: The Very Best of Edgar Winter	–	–	–	
2016	The Essential Edgar Winter [AKA The Definitive Collection]	–	–	–	2-CD set
2017	Tell Me in a Whisper: The Solo Albums 1970–1980	–	–	–	4-CD set
2018	I've Got News for You (1971–1977)	–	–	–	6-CD set

=== Albums with other artists ===
Year	Name	US Top 200
1976	Together with Johnny Winter (live)	89
1990	Edgar Winter & Rick Derringer: Live in Japan	–
2007	Edgar, Johnny Winter & Rick Derringer Live	–
2010	An Odd Couple with Steve Lukather (live)	–
"–" denotes releases that did not chart.

=== Singles ===
Year	Single	Peak chart positions						Certification	Album
Year	Single	US	AUS	CAN	GER	MEX	UK	Certification	Album
1970	"Tobacco Road"	–	–	–	–	–	–		Entrance
1971	"Where Would I Be"	128	–	–	–	–	–		Edgar Winter's White Trash
1971	"Give It Everything You Got"	–	–	–	–	–	–		Edgar Winter's White Trash
1971	"Keep Playin' That Rock 'n' Roll"	70	–	51	–	–	–		Edgar Winter's White Trash
1972	"I Can't Turn You Loose"	81	–	–	–	–	–		Roadwork
1972	"Round & Round"	108*	–	–	–	–	–		They Only Come Out at Night
1973	"Frankenstein"	1	19	1	39	10	18	US: Gold	They Only Come Out at Night
1973	"Free Ride"	14	84	8	–	–	–		They Only Come Out at Night
1973	"Hangin' Around"	65	–	39	–	–	–		They Only Come Out at Night
1973	"We All Had a Real Good Time "	–	–	–	–	–	–		They Only Come Out at Night
1974	"River's Risin'"	33	–	61	–	–	–		Shock Treatment
1974	"Easy Street"	83	–	79	–	–	–		Shock Treatment
1974	"Someone Take My Heart Away"	–	–	–	–	–	–		Shock Treatment
1975	"One Day Tomorrow"	–	–	–	–	–	–		Jasmine Nightdreams
1975	"Little Brother"	–	–	–	–	–	–		Jasmine Nightdreams
1975	"I Always Wanted You"	129*	–	–	–	–	–		Jasmine Nightdreams
1975	"People Music"	–	–	–	–	–	–		The Edgar Winter Group with Rick Derringer
1976	"Diamond Eyes"	–	–	–	–	–	–		The Edgar Winter Group with Rick Derringer
1976	"Let The Good Times Roll"	–	–	–	–	–	–		Together
1977	"Stickin' It Out"	–	–	–	–	–	–		Recycled
1979	"Above & Beyond"	–	–	–	–	–	–		The Edgar Winter Album
1979	"It's Your Life to Live"	–	–	–	–	–	–		The Edgar Winter Album
1981	"Love Is Everywhere"	–	–	–	–	–	–		Standing on Rock
1983	"Frankenstein 1984"	–	–	–	–	–	–		Single only
1989	"Cry Out"	–	–	–	–	–	–		Mission Earth
2000	"Texas"	–	–	–	–	–	–		Winter Blues
"–" denotes a recording that did not chart or was not released in that territory. "Above & Beyond" reached 94 on the US Dance chart in 1979. US Charts are Billboard unless otherwise noted. * Record World Singles Chart.

=== Producer ===
- Open Fire – (1978) (Ronnie Montrose) producer, piano, harpsichord
- Crazy from the Heat – (1985) (David Lee Roth)

=== Awards ===
- Brother Johnny – (2023) Grammy Award for Best Contemporary Blues Album 65th Annual Grammy Awards
