= DJ Fuze =

American Hip-Hop DJ

DJ Fuze, is an American Hip-Hop DJ and record producer, who is most known for his work in the 1990s with the multi-platinum, P-Funk-inspired rap group Digital Underground.

== Digital Underground ==
Fuze co-produced several songs on Digital Underground’s Grammy-nominated and multi-platinum debut album Sex Packets. Most notable of these songs is the Bay Area classic "Freaks of the Industry". He toured with D.U. internationally in 1990, supporting the group's singles "Doowutchyalike" and "The Humpty Dance" (Billboard Rap Chart position #1), and also toured the U.S. on the 1991 Budweiser Superfest tour supporting their follow-up effort This Is An EP Release featuring the single "Same Song" on which a young Tupac Shakur debuted. The following year, D.U. released Sons of the P, which featured the hit singles "Kiss You Back" and "No Nose Job", the latter of which showcased a unique scratching technique that Fuze playfully coined "the bumble-bee scratch", inspired by DJ QBert, and featured prominently in the song's intro. He demonstrated this scratch live at the Apollo Theater in 1992 during a televised performance with Digital Underground.

== Tupac ==
Fuze also collaborated with Tupac on his debut album 2Pacalypse Now. In addition to naming the album, Fuze produced the song "Violent", which is a partial remake of Shabba Ranks' and Cocoa Tea's dancehall hit "Pirate Anthem".

== Other work ==
=== Raw Fusion ===
Fuze was also one half of the group Raw Fusion along with fellow DU member Money-B. In 1991, the two scored a minor Bay Area radio hit "Throw Your Hands In The Air", which was the first single from their debut album Live from the Styleetron. The video, which featured cameo appearances by rappers Tupac and Saafir, was the first major video production by directors The Hughes Brothers, who later directed Menace II Society, Dead Presidents, American Pimp, and From Hell.

=== Luniz ===
In 1994, Fuze began working with the Oakland duo Luniz, and he produced three songs on their debut multi-platinum release Operation Stackola. Fuze also toured internationally with Luniz during their platinum period, supporting their hit "I Got Five On It".

=== Dru Down ===
Fuze also produced the minor Bay Area hit "Can You Feel Me" for Oakland rapper Dru Down in 1996.

== Film and video appearances ==
Fuze appeared with Digital Underground in the Hollywood 1991 cult film flop Nothing But Trouble, which starred Dan Aykroyd, John Candy, Chevy Chase, and Demi Moore. He also is featured in Digital Underground's videos for "The Humpty Dance", "Doowutchyalike", "Same Song", "Kiss You Back", and "No Nose Job".

Fuze also appeared with Tupac in the Oscar-nominated documentary film Tupac Resurrection as well as in Tupac's first two music videos, "Trapped" and "Brenda’s Got A Baby".

== Current activity ==
Fuze returned to college in 2003 and received a B.A. in International Development from the University of California, Berkeley, in 2007. He began touring again with Digital Underground upon graduating college, and he has also been sitting in with Dave Chappelle since 2008 at the comedian's exclusive Bay Area improv performances. He can now be found working with the youth of Oakland, California, hosting DJ classes through the non-profit organization Youth Radio.

== Discography ==
- Sex Packets (LP) Tommy Boy Music 1990
- This Is An E.P. Release (LP) Nuttin' Dis Funky Tommy Boy Music, Tommy Boy Music 1990
- Sons of the P (LP) title track + "No Nose Job" (single) Tommy Boy Music 1991
- Raw Fusion Live From The Styleetron Hollywood Basic Records 1992
- The "Body-Hat" Syndrome (CD) Tommy Boy Music 1993
- "Freaky Note" / "Glockadoodayoo" (12") Glockadoodayoo, Glocka... Hollywood BASIC 1994

== Production ==
- Freaks of The Industry (12") Tommy Boy Music 1990
- 2Pacalypse Now (CD) Interscope Records 1991
- Live From The Styleetron Hollywood Basic Records 1992
- Operation Stackola (CD) Noo Trybe Records 1995
- Can You Feel Me (CD) Relativity 1996

== Appearances ==
- The Humpty Dance (12") Tommy Boy Records 1989
- Sex Packets (CD) Tommy Boy Records 1990
- Same Song (EP Release Part 2) Nuttin' Nis Funky Tommy Boy Records 1991
- 2Pacalypse Now (CD) Interscope Records 1991
- Live From The Styleetron (CD) Hollywood BASIC 1991
- Sons Of The P (CD) Tommy Boy Records 1991
- Operation Stackola (CD) Virgin Records 1995
- Can You Feel Me (CD) Priority Records 1996
