= Live from the Styleetron =

Studio album by Raw Fusion
- Released: November 12, 1991
- Genre: Hip hop
- Length: 70:47
- Label: Hollywood Basic
- Producer: Money-B, DJ Fuze

Raw Fusion chronology
Live from the Styleetron (1991)	Hoochiefied Funk (1994)

Singles from Live from the Styleetron
- 1. "Rockin' to the PM" Released: 1991; 2. "Throw Your Hands in the Air" Released: 1991

Live from the Styleetron is the debut studio album by Oakland-based hip hop group Raw Fusion. Digital Underground member Ron Brooks, known as Money-B, produced the album with fellow DU member David Elliot, known as DJ FUZE. Tupac Shakur was one of the many DU affiliates to appear on the album. Live from the Styleetron peaked at number 32 on the Billboard Heatseekers chart. Raw Fusion promoted the album by opening for DU on a North American tour.

== Production ==
Digital Underground leader Gregory Jacobs guested on "Funkintoyoear", as both Shock G and Humpty Hump.

The album features eight members of Digital Underground, as well as guests Another Ninja, Cooley Ranks, Daddy Courtney, Jessica Jones, Mac-Mone, Margie Marie Rubio, Ronville, Sean, Styleetron, and Pam Taylor.

== 2Pac ==
Tupac Shakur, a roadie and backup dancer for Digital Underground, appeared as a guest artist on the album. Shakur's debut as an emcee had come only nine months prior, with the 19-year-old appearing on the DU track "Same Song", from the motion picture soundtrack to Nothing but Trouble. In October 1991, Shakur appeared on a single track on the DU album Sons of the P.

The track "#1 with a Bullet" was Shakur's third appearance as a rapper. Money-B stated in an interview that Shakur, at that time, was not the most lyrical rapper but was always able to grab the attention of everyone in the room, noting his tremendous work ethic, passion, and drive. Shakur released his first solo album, 2Pacalypse Now, on November 12, 1991, the same day that Live from the Styleetron was released.

== Critical reception ==
Professional ratings
Review scores
Source	Rating
AllMusic	4/5 stars

Trouser Press labeled the album "a forgettable, uneven debut". AllMusic compared Raw Fusion to jazz-influenced hip hop groups like A Tribe Called Quest and De La Soul.

== Track listing ==
#	Title	Length	Featured Artists	Sample(s)
1	"Live from the Styleetron"	3:03	Margie Marie Rubio	
2	"Hip Hip/Stylee Expression"	4:09		"Take Me to the Mardi Gras" by Bob James; "Drag Rap" by the Showboys; "La Di Da Di" by Doug E. Fresh feat. Slick Rick
3	"Don't Test"	5:30	Pam Taylor, Daddy Courtney	
4	"Do My Thang"	6:08		
5	"Ah Nah Go Drip"	6:34	Mac-Mone, Cooley Ranks, Clee	
6	"Nappy Headed Ninja"	4:31		
7	"Kill Mi Dead"	5:00	Mac-Mone	
8	"Rockin' to the P.M."	7:02	Roniece Levias, Piano-Man	"Get Up (I Feel Like Being a) Sex Machine" by James Brown; "Impeach the President" by the Honey Drippers; "Yes We Can Can" by the Pointer Sisters; "Change the Beat" by Beside; "Inspector Gadget" by Shuki Levy; "The Show" by Doug E. Fresh feat. Slick Rick
9	"Hang Time"	4:59		
10	"Traffic Jam"	5:21	Roniece Levias, Mac-Mone	
11	"Funkintoyoear"	4:43	Shock G, Big Money Odis, Pee Wee, Humpty Hump, Schmoovy-Schmoov	
12	"Wild Francis"	5:50	Roniece Levias, Mac-Mone	
13	"Throw Your Hands in the Air"	4:31	Mac-Mone, Piano-Man	"Bounce, Rock, Skate, Roll" by Vaughan Mason & Crew; "Children's Story" by Slick Rick; "Poison" by Bell Biv DeVoe
14	"#1 with a Bullet"	3:39	2Pac	"9mm Goes Bang" by Boogie Down Productions

== Billboard Charts ==
Year	Album details	Chart positions
Year	Album details	US Heatseekers
1991	Live from the Styleetron: Released: November 12, 1991; Label: Hollywood BASIC	32

== Credits ==
- Cover Illustration: Scott Anderson
- Cover Art Concept: Money-B, DJ FUZE
- Photography: Victor Hall
- Engineer, Mixing: Steve Counter, Darrin Harris, Matt Kelly, Money-B
- Mastering: Ken Lee
- Stylistic Advisor: Money-B
- Beat Box, Mixing, Scratching, Technician; DJ FUZE
- Bass, Guitar: Ramone "Pee Wee" Gooden
- Guitar: Sunny-B
- Saxophone: Jessica Jones
- Piano: The Piano-Man
