= Tupac: Resurrection (soundtrack) =

Soundtrack album by 2Pac
- Released: November 11, 2003
- Genre: West Coast hip hop; gangsta rap; hardcore hip hop; G-funk
- Length: 54:59
- Label: Amaru; Interscope
- Producer: Afeni Shakur (exec.); Easy Mo Bee; Eminem; Johnny "J"; Red Spyda; Shock G; Stretch

2Pac chronology
Nu-Mixx Klazzics (2003)	Tupac: Resurrection (2003)	2Pac Live (2004)

Singles from Tupac: Resurrection
- 1. "Runnin' (Dying to Live)" Released: September 6, 2003; 2. "One Day at a Time (Em's Version)" Released: March 22, 2004

Tupac: Resurrection is a soundtrack album for the Academy Award-nominated documentary of the same name. It was released on November 11, 2003, by Amaru Entertainment and Interscope Records.

== Background ==
It includes several previously released 2Pac recordings, including "Death Around the Corner" from Me Against the World, "Secretz of War" from Still I Rise, "Holler If Ya Hear Me" from Strictly 4 My N.I.G.G.A.Z... and "Rebel of the Underground" from 2Pacalypse Now; and unreleased 2Pac verses re-constructed into new tracks such as "Ghost", "One Day at a Time", and "Runnin (Dying to Live)".

== Singles ==
Single information
"One Day at a Time (Em's Version)"
- Released: 2003
- B-side:
"Runnin' (Dying to Live)"
- Released: 2003
- B-side: "Still Ballin"

== Production ==
Tupac's mother Afeni Shakur and Eminem executively produced the album.

The album features The Notorious B.I.G., Eminem, 50 Cent, Outlawz, and Digital Underground.

"Intro", "Ghost", "Death Around The Corner", "Bury Me A G" and "Str8 Ballin'" do not actually feature in the movie, but appear on the album.

== Critical reception ==
Professional ratings
Review scores
Source	Rating
AllMusic	4/5 stars
RapReviews.com	8/10
Rolling Stone	2/5 stars
Uncut	4/5 stars

The album received mixed to positive reviews.

== Commercial performance ==
The album sold more than 420,000 copies in its first week, debuting at number two on the Billboard 200 behind Jay-Z's The Black Album.

It sold 1,666,335 copies in the United States as of 2011.

It went platinum in the United States and gold in the United Kingdom.

== Awards and nominations ==
The song "Runnin' (Dying to Live)" won the Top Soundtrack Song of the Year award at the 2005 ASCAP Rhythm & Soul Music Awards.

== Track listing ==
No.	Title	Writer(s)	Producer	Length
1.	"Intro" (previously unreleased)			0:05
2.	"Ghost" (previously unreleased)	Tupac Shakur; Mark Jordan; Luis Resto; Marshall Mathers	Eminem	4:17
3.	"One Day at a Time (Em's Version)" (with Eminem feat. Outlawz) (previously unreleased)	Shakur; Henry Garcia; Malcolm Greenidge; Katari Cox; Rufus Cooper; Mathers; Resto; Delray Richardson	Eminem	3:44
4.	"Death Around the Corner" (from Me Against the World, 1995)	Shakur; Johnny "J" Jackson	Johnny "J"	4:07
5.	"Secretz of War" (feat. Outlawz) (from Still I Rise, 1999)	Shakur; R. Cooper; Greenridge; Yafeu Fula; J. Jackson; Bruce Washington	Johnny "J"	4:13
6.	"Runnin' (Dying to Live)" (feat. The Notorious B.I.G.) (released in 2002)	Shakur; Christopher Wallace; Osten Harvey; Edgar Winter; Mathers; Resto	Eminem; Easy Mo Bee	3:51
7.	"Holler If Ya Hear Me" (from Strictly 4 My N.I.G.G.A.Z..., 1993)	Shakur; Randy Walker; Barrett Strong; Norman Whitfield	Stretch	4:38
8.	"Starin' Through My Rear View" (feat. Outlawz) (from Gang Related soundtrack, 1997)	Shakur; Tyrone Wrice; Greenridge; Fula; Phil Collins	Makaveli; Johnny "J"	5:11
9.	"Bury Me a G" (feat. Thug Life) (from Thug Life, Volume I, 1994)	Shakur; Diron Rivers; Tyruss Himes; Walter Burns; Maurice Harding; Ronald Isley; Ernie Isley; Marvin Isley; Rudolph Isley; O'Kelly Isley Jr.; Chris Jasper	Thug Music	5:00
10.	"Same Song" (feat. Digital Underground, from This Is an EP Release, 1991)	Shakur; Ronald Brooks; George Clinton, Jr.; William Collins; Gregory Jacobs; J.S. Theracon; Jim Vitti	Shock G	3:57
11.	"Panther Power" (feat. Tyson) (from The Lost Tapes: Circa 1989, 2000)	Shakur; Raymond Tyson; Mark Dorado; Jimi "Chopmaster J" Dright	Chopmaster J and Strictly Dope	4:36
12.	"Str8 Ballin'" (from Thug Life, Volume I, 1994)	Shakur; Harvey; Clinton Jr.; Collins; Gary Cooper	Easy Mo Bee	5:04
13.	"Rebel of the Underground" (from 2Pacalypse Now, 1991)	Shakur; Jacobs	Shock G	3:17
14.	"The Realist Killaz" (feat. 50 Cent) (previously unreleased)	Shakur; Curtis Jackson; Andy Thelusma; Calvin Broadus; Washington; Fula; R. Cooper; Cox; Joseph Paquette; Wrice; Brad Jordan; Mike Dean; James Harris; Terry Lewis	Red Spyda	2:59
Total length:				54:59

Sample credits

- "Runnin' (Dying to Live)"
  - "Dying to Live" by Edgar Winter
- "The Realist Killaz"
  - "Hail Mary" by Makaveli
- "Starin' Through My Rear View"
  - "In The Air Tonight" by Phil Collins

== Charts ==
=== Weekly charts ===
Chart (2003–04)	Peak position
Belgian Albums (Ultratop Flanders)	41
Canadian Albums (Billboard)	3
Canadian R&B Albums (Nielsen SoundScan)	2
Dutch Albums (Album Top 100)	36
French Albums (SNEP)	57
German Albums (Offizielle Top 100)	76
Irish Albums (IRMA)	25
Swiss Albums (Schweizer Hitparade)	68
UK Albums (OCC)	62
US Billboard 200	2
US Top R&B/Hip-Hop Albums (Billboard)	3
US Soundtrack Albums (Billboard)	1

=== Year-end charts ===
Chart (2003)	Position
US Billboard 200	161
US Top R&B/Hip-Hop Albums (Billboard)	84
US Soundtrack Albums (Billboard)	12

Chart (2004)	Position
US Billboard 200	57
US Top R&B/Hip-Hop Albums (Billboard)	27
US Soundtrack Albums (Billboard)	1

== Certifications ==
Region	Certification	Certified units/sales
United Kingdom (BPI)	Gold	100,000^{^}
United States (RIAA)	Platinum	1,666,335
^{^} Shipments figures based on certification alone.
