= No Nose Job: The Legend of Digital Underground =

Compilation album by Digital Underground
- Released: June 19, 2001
- Genre: West Coast hip hop, alternative hip hop
- Label: Tommy Boy
- Producer: Digital Underground

Digital Underground chronology
The Lost Files (1999)	No Nose Job: The Legend of Digital Underground (2001)	Playwutchyalike: The Best of Digital Underground (2003)

Professional ratings
Review scores
Source	Rating
Allmusic	4/5 stars

No Nose Job: The Legend of Digital Underground is the first compilation album from the rap group, Digital Underground. It features several of their songs, such as "Same Song" and "The Humpty Dance".

== Track listing ==
1. "The Humpty Dance"
2. "Freaks Of The Industry"
3. "Doowutchyalike"
4. "Same Song"
5. "The Way We Swing"
6. "Packet Man"
7. "Dope-A-Delic (Do-U-B-Leeve-In-D-Flo)"
8. "No Nose Job (ultafunk Remix)"
9. "Kiss You Back"
10. "The Return Of The Crazy One"
11. "Wussup With The Love"
12. "Carry The Way (Along Time)"
13. "Flowin' On The D Line"
14. "Doo Woo You"
