= Kiss You Back =

Single by Digital Underground

from the album Sons of the P
- Released: 1991
- Recorded: 1991
- Genre: Hip hop
- Label: Tommy Boy
- Songwriters: Gregory Jacobs; Ron Brooks; George Clinton Jr.; Philippé Wynne
- Producer: The Underground Production Squad

Digital Underground singles chronology
"Same Song" (1991)	"Kiss You Back" (1991)	"No Nose Job" (1992)

Music video
- "Kiss You Back" on YouTube

Professional ratings
Review scores
Source	Rating
AllMusic	3/5 stars

"Kiss You Back" is a song written by Shock G, Money-B, George Clinton Jr. and Philippé Wynne, and performed by American hip hop group Digital Underground. It was released in 1991 through Tommy Boy Records as the lead single from the group's second full-length studio album Sons of the P. Produced and mixed by D.U. in-house production team credited as The Underground Production Squad, it contains a sample from Funkadelic's song "(Not Just) Knee Deep".

The song made it to number 40 on the Billboard Hot 100, number 50 on the Radio Songs, number 13 on the Hot R&B/Hip-Hop Songs, number 5 on the Hot Rap Songs and number 7 on the Dance Singles Sales charts in the United States. It also peaked at number 31 in New Zealand. On March 5, 1992, the song was certified gold by the Recording Industry Association of America for selling 500,000 copies in the US alone.

Released a year after the group's breakthrough single "The Humpty Dance", "Kiss You Back" became Digital Underground's second single to reach the US top-40.

== Track listing ==
No.	Title	Length
1.	"Kiss You Back" (Smack On The Cheek Mix)
2.	"Kiss You Back" (LP Mix)
3.	"Kiss You Back" (Full French Kiss Mix)
4.	"Kiss You Back" (Smackapella Mix)

== Personnel ==
- Gregory "Shock G" Jacobs — vocals, executive producer, illustration
- Ronald "Money-B" Brooks — vocals
- The Underground Production Squad — producers, mixing
- Atron Gregory — executive producer

== Charts ==
Chart (1991–1992)	Peak position
Australia (ARIA)	97
New Zealand (Recorded Music NZ)	31
US Billboard Hot 100	40
US Radio Songs (Billboard)	50
US Hot R&B/Hip-Hop Songs (Billboard)	13
US Hot Rap Songs (Billboard)	5
US Dance Singles Sales (Billboard)	7

== Certifications ==
Region	Certification	Certified units/sales
United States (RIAA)	Gold	500,000^{^}
^{^} Shipments figures based on certification alone.
