= Playwutchyalike: The Best of Digital Underground =

Compilation album by Digital Underground
- Released: June 10, 2003
- Genre: West coast rap
- Label: Tommy Boy Records/Rhino
- Producer: Digital Underground

Digital Underground chronology
No Nose Job: The Legend of Digital Underground (2001)	Playwutchyalike: The Best of Digital Underground (2003)

Professional ratings
Review scores
Source	Rating
AllMusic	4.5/5 stars
The Encyclopedia of Popular Music	4/5 stars

Playwutchyalike: The Best of Digital Underground is the second compilation album from rap group Digital Underground.

== Track listing ==
1. "Same Song" (Edit)
2. "The Way We Swing"
3. "Underwater Rimes" (Remix)
4. "The Humpty Dance"
5. "Freaks of the Industry"
6. "Doowutchyalike"
7. "Sex Packets"
8. "Packet Man"
9. "Nuttin' Nis Funky"
10. "Heartbeat Props"
11. "No Nose Job"
12. "Kiss You Back"
13. "Wussup wit the Luv" (Single version)
14. "We Got More"
