= The Return of the Crazy One =

Single by Digital Underground

from the album The Body-Hat Syndrome
- Released: September 21, 1993
- Recorded: 1993
- Genre: Hip hop
- Length: 4:40
- Label: Tommy Boy; Warner Bros.
- Songwriter: Gregory Jacobs
- Producer: The D-Flow Production Squad

Digital Underground singles chronology
"I Get Around" (1993)	"The Return of the Crazy One" (1993)	"Wussup wit the Luv" (1994)

Music video
- "The Return of the Crazy One" on YouTube

"The Return of the Crazy One" is the first single from Digital Underground's third album, The Body-Hat Syndrome (1993). It was written and produced by the D-Flow Production Squad, Digital Underground’s in-house production team.

== Charts ==
Chart (1993–1994)	Peak position
US Hot R&B/Hip-Hop Songs (Billboard)	77
US Maxi-Singles Sales (Billboard)	10
