= Raw Fusion =

US rap group

- Money B and DJ Fuze

Background information
- Origin: Oakland, California, U.S.
- Genre: Hip hop
- Years active: 1991–1994
- Labels: Hollywood, Elektra
- Spinoff of: Digital Underground
- Members: Money-B; DJ Fuze

Raw Fusion was an American spin-off project from Digital Underground emcee Money-B, with DJ talent provided by DU contributor DJ Fuze. Their albums contained cameos by many of the Digital Underground crew, including Shock G (as himself, Humpty Hump, and the Piano Man) and 2Pac. The group gave a more raw, hardcore feel than the funky styles that typical Digital Underground albums projected, pulling away from their Funkadelic and Parliament roots. Tracks put out under the Raw Fusion name tended to be more experimental, and had less of the flow, that was typically found in other tracks to which Money-B and DJ Fuze had contributed. The group released two albums before disbanding.

== Discography ==
Albums

- Live from the Styleetron (1991)
- Hoochiefied Funk (1994)

Year	Album details	Chart positions
Year	Album details	US Heatseekers
1991	Live from the Styleetron: Released: November 12, 1991; Label: Hollywood BASIC	32
