= No Nose Job =

Single by Digital Underground

from the album Sons of the P
- Released: February 15, 1992
- Recorded: 1991
- Genre: Hip hop
- Length: 4:59
- Label: Tommy Boy; Warner Bros.
- Songwriter(s): Gregory Jacobs
- Producer(s): Shock G

Digital Underground singles chronology
"Kiss You Back" (1991)	"No Nose Job" (1992)	"I Get Around" (1993)

Music video
- "No Nose Job" on YouTube

"No Nose Job" is the second and final single from Digital Underground's second album Sons of the P. It was written and produced by Shock G and Tupac Shakur.

== Music video ==
The music video features a cameo by 2Pac.

== Charts ==
Chart (1992)	Peak position
US Hot R&B/Hip-Hop Songs (Billboard)	28
US Hot Rap Songs (Billboard)	27
