= The Body-Hat Syndrome =

Studio album by Digital Underground
- Released: October 5, 1993
- Recorded: 1993
- Genre: West Coast hip hop
- Length: 1:14:47
- Label: Tommy Boy
- Producer: D-Flow Production Squad

Digital Underground chronology
Sons of the P (1991)	The Body-Hat Syndrome (1993)	Future Rhythm (1996)

Singles from The Body-Hat Syndrome
- 1. "The Return of the Crazy One" Released: September 21, 1993; 2. "Wussup Wit the Luv" Released: February 20, 1994

The Body-Hat Syndrome is the third full-length studio album by American hip hop group Digital Underground. It was released on October 5, 1993, via Tommy Boy Records. The album was produced by the D-Flow Production Squad. It peaked at number 79 on the Billboard 200 and number 16 on the Top R&B/Hip-Hop Albums in the United States.

The album saw rappers Saafir and Clee were added to the line-up. The opening song, "The Return of the Crazy One", which sampled Parliament's "Aqua Boogie (A Psychoalphadiscobetabioaquadoloop)", was released on September 21, 1993, as the lead single before the album's release, and peaked at number 77 on the US Hot R&B/Hip-Hop Songs. The album's second single, an anti-racism cultural awareness politico called "Wussup Wit the Luv", which features a guitar solo from the Funkadelic guitarist Michael Hampton and a verse from 2Pac, made it to number 99 on the Hot R&B/Hip-Hop Songs. Music videos were released for both of the album's singles. This was the last time 2Pac appeared on a Digital Underground studio album, despite Future Rhythm being recorded entirely before his death in 1996. The album also contains "The Humpty Dance Awards", the group's humorous shout-out to the many artists who sampled "The Humpty Dance" before 1993. Since then the list has grown to over 50 artists.

== Critical reception ==
Professional ratings
Review scores
Source	Rating
AllMusic	3/5 stars
Robert Christgau	A−
RapReviews	7/10
(The New) Rolling Stone Album Guide	4/5 stars

The Boston Globe called The Body-Hat Syndrome one of 1993's best hip hop albums. Trouser Press wrote: "Musically, Digital Underground is back at the top of its game, but conceptually the group is sounding the retreat".

== Track listing ==
No.	Title	Writer(s)	Length
1.	"The Return of the Crazy One"	Gregory Jacobs; Jeremy Jackson; George Clinton; Bernie Worrell; William Collins	4:39
2.	"Doo Woo You"	Jacobs; Reggie Gibson; David Elliot	7:36
3.	"Holly Wantstaho"	Jacobs; Gibson; Elliot; Clinton; Worrell	3:35
4.	"Bran Nu Swetta"	Jacobs; Ronald Brooks; Gibson; Elliot	4:58
5.	"The Humpty Dance Awards"	Jacobs	4:51
6.	"Body-Hats (Part One)"	Jacobs; Brooks; Gibson	1:36
7.	"Dope-A-Delic (Do-U-B-Leeve-In-D-Flo?)"	Jacobs; Brooks; Cleveland Askew; Clinton; Worrell; Collins; Walter "Junie" Morrison	4:07
8.	"Intermission"	Jacobs	0:54
9.	"Wussup wit the Luv"	Jacobs; Brooks; Askew; Tupac Shakur; Michael Hampton	6:35
10.	"Digital Lover"	Jacobs; Gibson; Charlie Wilson; Roger Troutman	4:38
11.	"Carry the Way (Along Time)"	Jacobs; Brooks; Gibson; Askew	4:15
12.	"Body-Hats (Part Two)"	Jacobs; Brooks; Gibson	1:31
13.	"Circus Entrance"	Jacobs; Askew	1:54
14.	"Jerkit Circus"	Jacobs; Brooks; Elliot	4:50
15.	"Circus Exit (The After-Nut)"	Jacobs; Elliot	0:43
16.	"Shake & Bake"	Jacobs; Brooks; Clinton; Collins	4:34
17.	"Body-Hats (Part Three)"	Jacobs; Brooks; Gibson	3:07
18.	"Do Ya Like It Dirty?"	Jacobs; Askew; Jackson; Michael Boston	4:45
19.	"Bran Nu Sweat This Beat"	Jacobs; Elliot	0:33
20.	"Wheee!"	Jacobs; Brooks; Gibson; Askew; Earl Cook; Clinton; DeWayne McKnight	5:08
Total length:			1:14:47

Sample credits

- Track 1 sampled "Aqua Boogie (A Psychoalphadiscobetabioaquadoloop)" performed by Parliament.
- Track 3 sampled "Holly Wants to Go to California" performed by Funkadelic.
- Track 7 sampled "Colour Me Funky" and "Trombipulation" performed by Parliament.
- Track 10 sampled "Computer Love" performed by Zapp.
- Track 16 sampled "Funkentelechy" performed by Parliament.
- Track 20 sampled "The Freeze" performed by Parliament.

Notes

- Tracks 1, 5, 6, 12, 14, 16 and 17 features Shock G's alter ego Humpty Hump.
- Tracks 5, 7 and 20 are omitted from all the cassette versions of the album.
- The "Special Italian Vinyl Version" of the album, which is the only LP version containing the original picture sleeve and comic insert.

== Personnel ==
- Gregory "Shock G" Jacobs — vocals, keyboards, turntables, programming, producer, arranger, art direction, illustrations, layout
- Ronald "Money-B" Brooks — vocals
- Reggie "Saafir" Gibson — vocals
- Cleveland "Clee" Askew — vocals
- Tupac "2Pac" Shakur — vocals (track 9)
- Michael "Dirty-Red" Boston — vocals (track 18)
- Earl "Schmoovy-Schmoov" Cook — vocals (track 20)
- David "DJ Fuze" Elliot — keyboards, turntables, programming
- Jeremy "Jay-Z" Jackson — additional vocals, keyboards, turntables, programming
- Ramone "Pee-Wee" Gooden — additional vocals
- Descaro "Mack Mone" Moore — additional vocals
- Shirley "Shassiah" Tabor — additional vocals
- Ronald "Omar" Everett — additional vocals
- Toby "T-Love" Holton — additional vocals
- Ronvell Sharper — additional vocals
- Gwen Everett — additional vocals
- Kim Morgan — additional vocals
- Michael Hampton — lead guitar (track 9)
- Mark "Mark Sexx" Skeete — additional vocals
- Shawn "The Shah" Trone — additional vocals
- Gary "Mudbone" Cooper — additional vocals
- Garry Shider — additional vocals
- D-Love — additional vocals
- O.B. — additional vocals
- Michael Denten — recording & mixing
- Darrin Harris — recording & mixing
- Steve Counter — recording & mixing
- Mark Slagle — recording & mixing
- Matt Kelley — recording & mixing
- Bob Morse — recording & mixing
- Renwick Smith Curry — engineering
- Malcolm Sherwood — engineering
- Jeff Gray — engineering
- Ken Lee — mastering
- Erwin Gorostiza — art direction, layout
- Mark Weinberg — design

== Charts ==
Chart (1993)	Peak position
US Billboard 200	79
US Top R&B/Hip-Hop Albums (Billboard)	16
