= Back In... =

Canadian television series

- Genre: Retrospective documentary series
- Country of origin: Canada
- No. of episodes: 20

Original release
- Network: M3

Related
- Back In... Love

Back In... is a retrospective documentary series broadcast on the Canadian music video channel MuchMoreMusic. The series also airs on Star! and some Citytv stations. 20 episodes have been broadcast, each profiled by a different year, going from 1980 to 1999. Each episode's title would always end with the last two digits of a year; such an example would be "Back In... '88" or "Back In... '99".

== About the show ==
The show premiered in 2004. Anderson Cooper was a commentator on the series.

- Fashions
- Fads
- Famous people born that year
- Top-selling albums of the year
- One-hit wonders
- Grammy Award winners
- Hunks and babes
- Hitched and ditched
- Highest-grossing movies for that year
- Movie award winners
- The top television programs for the season
- In memoriam
- Various top news stories
- (Occasionally) Where are they now?
- Chinese zodiac
- The top five best and worst videos of the year

== 1980s ==
=== 1980 ===
Best videos

1. "Video Killed the Radio Star" by Buggles
2. "Whip It" by Devo
3. "Ashes to Ashes" by David Bowie
4. "Once in a Lifetime" by Talking Heads
5. "Crazy Little Thing Called Love" by Queen

Worst videos

1. "Pop Muzik" by M
2. "The Tide Is High" by Blondie
3. "Can You Feel It" by The Jacksons
4. "Turn Me Loose" by Loverboy
5. "Could I Be Dreaming" by The Pointer Sisters

=== 1981 ===
Best videos

1. "Girls on Film" by Duran Duran
2. "Rapture" by Blondie
3. "Shake It Up" by The Cars
4. "Our Lips Are Sealed" by The Go-Go's
5. "Start Me Up" by The Rolling Stones

Worst videos

1. "Keep on Loving You" by REO Speedwagon
2. "The One That You Love" by Air Supply
3. "Give It to Me Baby" by Rick James
4. "Jessie's Girl" by Rick Springfield
5. "Working for the Weekend" by Loverboy

=== 1982 ===
Best videos

1. "Shock the Monkey" by Peter Gabriel
2. "Hungry Like the Wolf" by Duran Duran
3. "Don't You Want Me?" by The Human League
4. "Rock the Casbah" by The Clash
5. "Mickey" by Toni Basil

Worst videos

1. "Abracadabra" by Steve Miller Band
2. "Twilight Zone" by Golden Earring
3. "Poison Arrow" by ABC
4. "Down Under" by Men at Work
5. "I Ran (So Far Away)" by A Flock of Seagulls

=== 1983 ===
Best videos

1. "Thriller" by Michael Jackson
2. "Psycho Therapy" by Ramones
3. "Rockit" by Herbie Hancock
4. "Burning Down the House" by Talking Heads
5. "Our House" by Madness

Worst videos

1. "Mr. Roboto" by Styx
2. "Making Love Out of Nothing at All" by Air Supply
3. "Hot Girls in Love" by Loverboy
4. "Love Is a Battlefield" by Pat Benatar
5. "The Safety Dance" by Men Without Hats

=== 1984 ===
Best videos

1. "You Might Think" by The Cars
2. "Legs" by ZZ Top
3. "Jump" by Van Halen
4. "Sweet Dreams (Are Made of This)" by Eurythmics
5. "Smalltown Boy" by Bronski Beat

Worst videos

1. "We Should Be Lovers" by Zappacosta
2. "Give It Up" by KC and the Sunshine Band
3. "Rock Me Tonite" by Billy Squier
4. "Self Control" by Laura Branigan
5. "Somebody's Watching Me" by Rockwell

=== 1985 ===
Best videos

1. "Take On Me" by a-ha
2. "The Boys of Summer" by Don Henley
3. "Money for Nothing" by Dire Straits
4. "Don't Come Around Here No More" by Tom Petty and the Heartbreakers
5. "Cry" by Godley and Creme

Worst videos

1. "We Built This City" by Starship
2. "The Goonies 'R' Good Enough" by Cyndi Lauper
3. "Loverboy" by Billy Ocean
4. "Can't Fight This Feeling" by REO Speedwagon
5. "Miami Vice Theme" by Jan Hammer

=== 1986 ===
Best videos

1. "Sledgehammer" by Peter Gabriel
2. "Walk This Way" by Run-DMC featuring Aerosmith
3. "Addicted to Love" by Robert Palmer
4. "Papa Don't Preach" by Madonna
5. "Nasty" by Janet Jackson

Worst videos

1. "Real American" by Rick Derringer featuring Hulk Hogan
2. "Heartbeat" by Don Johnson
3. "We Don't Have to Take Our Clothes Off" by Jermaine Stewart
4. "Crush on You" by The Jets
5. "Bad Boys" by Gloria Estefan & Miami Sound Machine

=== 1987 ===
Best videos

1. "Land of Confusion" by Genesis
2. "Missionary Man" by Eurythmics
3. "Where the Streets Have No Name" by U2
4. "(You Gotta) Fight for Your Right (To Party!)" by Beastie Boys
5. "Dear God" by XTC

Worst videos

1. "Holiday Rap" by MC Miker G & DJ Sven
2. "We'll Be Together" by Sting
3. "Right on Track" by Breakfast Club
4. "Nothing's Gonna Change My Love for You" by Glenn Medeiros
5. "Talk Dirty to Me" by Poison

=== 1988 ===
Best videos

1. "This Note's for You" by Neil Young
2. "Need You Tonight" by INXS
3. "Faith" by George Michael
4. "Sweet Child o' Mine" by Guns N' Roses
5. "Fast Car" by Tracy Chapman

Worst videos

1. "Could've Been" by Tiffany
2. "Get Outta My Dreams, Get into My Car" by Billy Ocean
3. "Kokomo" by The Beach Boys
4. "Don't Worry, Be Happy" by Bobby McFerrin
5. "She's Like the Wind" by Patrick Swayze

=== 1989 ===
Best videos

1. "One" by Metallica
2. "Like a Prayer" by Madonna
3. "Free Fallin'" by Tom Petty
4. "All I Want Is You" by U2
5. "Fight the Power" by Public Enemy

Worst videos

1. "Electric Youth" by Debbie Gibson
2. "Seventeen" by Winger
3. "Sacred Emotion" by Donny Osmond
4. "Hangin' Tough" by New Kids on the Block
5. "How Am I Supposed to Live Without You" by Michael Bolton

== 1990s ==
=== 1990 ===
Best videos

1. "Freedom! '90" by George Michael
2. "Been Caught Stealing" by Jane's Addiction
3. "Janie's Got a Gun" by Aerosmith
4. "Epic" by Faith No More
5. "Thunderstruck" by AC/DC

Worst videos

1. "Have You Seen Her" by MC Hammer
2. "After the Rain" by Nelson
3. "Step by Step" by New Kids on the Block
4. "The Humpty Dance" by Digital Underground
5. "Romeo" by Dino

=== 1991 ===
Best videos

1. "Smells Like Teen Spirit" by Nirvana
2. "Losing My Religion" by R.E.M.
3. "Justify My Love" by Madonna
4. "Black or White" by Michael Jackson
5. "Wicked Game" by Chris Isaak

Worst videos

1. "Rico Suave" by Gerardo
2. "Too Legit to Quit" by MC Hammer
3. "Joyride" by Roxette
4. "Promise of a New Day" by Paula Abdul
5. "All 4 Love" by Color Me Badd

=== 1992 ===
Best videos

1. "Jeremy" by Pearl Jam
2. "November Rain" by Guns N' Roses
3. "Right Now" by Van Halen
4. "One" by U2
5. "In Bloom" by Nirvana

Worst videos

1. "Achy Breaky Heart" by Billy Ray Cyrus
2. "Missing You Now" by Michael Bolton featuring Kenny G
3. "Oochie Coochie" by MC Brains
4. "Take This Heart" by Richard Marx
5. "Will You Marry Me?" by Paula Abdul

=== 1993 ===
Best videos

1. "Everybody Hurts" by R.E.M.
2. "Cryin'" by Aerosmith
3. "Are You Gonna Go My Way" by Lenny Kravitz
4. "Human Behaviour" by Björk
5. "Runaway Train" by Soul Asylum

Worst videos

1. "Rock 'Em Sock 'Em Techno" by BKS featuring Don Cherry
2. "All That She Wants" by Ace of Base
3. "Bad Boys" by Inner Circle
4. "I'd Do Anything for Love (But I Won't Do That)" by Meat Loaf
5. "My Baby Loves a Bunch of Authors" by Moxy Früvous

=== 1994 ===
Best videos

1. "Sabotage" by Beastie Boys
2. "Buddy Holly" by Weezer
3. "Loser" by Beck
4. "Basket Case" by Green Day
5. "Creep" by TLC

Worst videos

1. "Cotton Eye Joe" by Rednex
2. "Biological Didn't Bother" by Shaquille O'Neal
3. "Pumps and a Bump" by MC Hammer
4. "Tootsie Roll" by 69 Boyz
5. "The Sign" by Ace of Base

=== 1995 ===
Best videos

1. "Waterfalls" by TLC
2. "Just" by Radiohead
3. "Scream" by Michael Jackson & Janet Jackson
4. "Bullet with Butterfly Wings" by Smashing Pumpkins
5. "Lightning Crashes" by Live

Worst videos

1. "You Are Not Alone" by Michael Jackson
2. "Beautiful Life" by Ace of Base
3. "Hold On" by Jamie Walters
4. "My Love Is for Real" by Paula Abdul
5. "Only Wanna Be with You" by Hootie & the Blowfish

=== 1996 ===
Best videos

1. "Virtual Insanity" by Jamiroquai
2. "Street Spirit (Fade Out)" by Radiohead
3. "Big Me" by Foo Fighters
4. "Tonight Tonight" by Smashing Pumpkins
5. "Devil's Haircut" by Beck

Worst videos

1. "C'mon N' Ride It (The Train)" by Quad City DJs
2. "Walking in Memphis" by Cher
3. "It's All Coming Back to Me Now" by Celine Dion
4. "Get Down (You're the One for Me)" Backstreet Boys
5. "Pony" by Ginuwine

=== 1997 ===
Best videos

1. "Da Funk" by Daft Punk
2. "Good Riddance (Time of Your Life)" by Green Day
3. "Paranoid Android" by Radiohead
4. "The Rain (Supa Dupa Fly)" by Missy Elliott
5. "Everlong" by Foo Fighters

Worst videos

1. "Barbie Girl" by Aqua
2. "Invisible Man" by 98 Degrees
3. "Honey" by Mariah Carey
4. "Quit Playing Games (With My Heart)" by Backstreet Boys
5. "MMMBop" by Hanson

=== 1998 ===
Best videos

1. "Ray of Light" by Madonna
2. "Doo Wop (That Thing)" by Lauryn Hill
3. "Torn" by Natalie Imbruglia
4. "Pretty Fly (For a White Guy)" by The Offspring
5. "Turn the Page" by Metallica

Worst videos

1. "Crazy Little Party Girl" by Aaron Carter
2. "If I Could Turn Back the Hands of Time" by R. Kelly
3. "Another One Bites the Dust" by Queen & Wyclef Jean featuring Pras & Free
4. "Are You Jimmy Ray?" by Jimmy Ray
5. "I Want You Back" by *NSYNC

=== 1999 ===
Best videos

1. "Praise You" by Fatboy Slim
2. "Everything Is Everything" by Lauryn Hill
3. "Learn to Fly" by Foo Fighters
4. "Let Forever Be" by The Chemical Brothers
5. "Unpretty" by TLC

Worst videos

1. "Give It to You" by Jordan Knight
2. "Look at Me" by Geri Halliwell
3. "From the Bottom of My Broken Heart" by Britney Spears
4. "I Drive Myself Crazy" by *NSYNC
5. "We Like to Party" by Vengaboys

== Spinoff ==
In late August 2006, a spinoff of Back In... was created, called Back In... Love connecting celebrities to other celebrities who had alleged or confirmed sexual or romantic encounters.

== Reception ==
CanWest News Service's Alex Strachan called Back In... a "fast-moving, witty nostalgia series". Strachan said that Anderson Cooper offered "ironic commentary" and that it was "a delightful, if occasionally scary, year-by-year look at pop culture in the mid-1980s and early 1990s". Brad Oswald of the Winnipeg Free Press thought the series was a "flimsy pop-culture retrospective" that is "lightweight fun".
