= Who Got the Gravy? =

Studio album by Digital Underground
- Released: September 8, 1998
- Genre: Hip hop
- Length: 52:44
- Label: Jake
- Producer: D-Flow Production Squad

Digital Underground chronology
| Future Rhythm (1996) | Who Got the Gravy? (1998) | ..Cuz a D.U. Party Don't Stop! (2008) |

Professional ratings
Review scores
| Source | Rating |
|---|---|
| AllMusic | 4/5 stars |
| Entertainment Weekly | B+ |
| (The New) Rolling Stone Album Guide | 3.5/5 stars |
| The Village Voice | (3-star Honorable Mention) |

Who Got the Gravy? is the fifth studio album by American hip hop group Digital Underground. It was released on September 8, 1998, via Jake Records. The album was produced by the D-Flow Production Squad. It features guest appearances from KRS-One, Big Pun, Biz Markie, Bust Stop of O.F.T.B., Trunk Turner, and Whateva. The album marks the debut of Esinchill and Mystic. The album did not reach the Billboard 200; however, it peaked at number 91 on the Top R&B/Hip-Hop Albums chart in the United States. It was met with generally favorable reviews from music critics.

== Track listing ==
| No. | Title | Writer(s) | Length |
|---|---|---|---|
| 1. | "I Shall Return (Intro)" (featuring KRS-One) | Gregory Jacobs; Lawrence Parker; Jeremy Jackson | 1:37 |
| 2. | "Holla-Holliday" | Jacobs; Cleveland Askew; Jackson; John Ashley Smith | 5:27 |
| 3. | "Wind Me Up" (featuring Esinchill) | Jacobs; Erick B. Campbell; Genji Siraisi; George Clinton; William Collins | 6:56 |
| 4. | "The Mission" (featuring Big Punisher, Bust Stop and Whateva) | Jacobs; Christopher Rios; Sammie Williams; Desmond A. Douglas; Barry White | 5:07 |
| 5. | "Odd Couple" (featuring Biz Markie) | Jacobs; Marcel Theo Hall; Jackson | 3:26 |
| 6. | "Blind Mice" | Jacobs; Askew; Smith | 5:09 |
| 7. | "The Gravy" (featuring Truck Turner) | Jacobs; D. McKay; John Alexander | 4:54 |
| 8. | "Peanut Hakeem" | Jacobs | 2:56 |
| 9. | "Man's Girl" | Jacobs; Ronald Brooks; Askew; Quintin Washington; White | 8:17 |
| 10. | "April Showers" (featuring Mystik) | Jacobs; Brooks; Mandolyn Ludlum; Jackson | 5:09 |
| 11. | "Cyber Teeth Tigers" (featuring KRS-One) | Jacobs; Parker; Barrett Strong; Norman Whitfield | 3:46 |
| Total length: | | | 52:44 |

== Charts ==
| Chart (1998) | Peak position |
|---|---|
| US Top R&B/Hip-Hop Albums (Billboard) | 91 |
