= This Is an EP Release =

EP by Digital Underground
- Released: January 15, 1991
- Recorded: 1990
- Genre: West Coast hip hop; jazz rap; electro-funk
- Length: 33:09
- Label: Tommy Boy
- Producer: Digital Underground

Digital Underground chronology
Sex Packets (1990)	This Is an EP Release (1991)	Sons of the P (1991)

Singles from This Is an EP Release
- 1. "Same Song" Released: January 6, 1991

Professional ratings
Review scores
Source	Rating
AllMusic	4/5 stars
Christgau's Consumer Guide: Albums of the '90s	A−
Entertainment Weekly	B
Los Angeles Times	3.5/4 stars
RapReviews	8/10

This Is an EP Release is the first extended play by American hip hop group Digital Underground. It was released on January 15, 1991, through TNT Recordings and Tommy Boy Records. The EP was produced by Digital Underground. It peaked at number 29 on the Billboard 200 and number 7 on the Top R&B/Hip-Hop Albums in the United States. It was certified gold on March 18, 1991, by the Recording Industry Association of America for selling 500,000 units.

Its single "Same Song" made it to number 61 on the Radio Songs and number 15 on the Dance Club Songs charts in the United States. Both "Same Song" and "Tie the Knot" off of the EP were included in the soundtrack to 1991 comedy horror film Nothing but Trouble. The album marks the expansion of the group with the debuts of 2Pac and Big Money Odis.

A music video for "Same Song" uses new footage from cast members from the film Nothing but Trouble, as well as clips from the film. Dan Aykroyd appears portraying a Scottish bagpipe artist, as well as a Los Angeles gang member, 2Pac portrayed an African king, while Dr. Dre and Eazy-E make cameo appearances. "Tie the Knot" contained jazz-influenced piano tracks and a comedic interpretation of "Bridal Chorus".

== Track listing ==
No.	Title	Writer(s)	Length
1.	"Same Song" (featuring 2Pac)	Gregory Jacobs; Ronald Brooks; Tupac Shakur	6:29
2.	"Tie the Knot"	Jacobs	3:13
3.	"The Way We Swing (Remix)" (featuring 2Pac)	Jacobs; Jimi Hendrix	4:58
4.	"Nuttin' Nis Funky"	Jacobs; Miles Davis	9:41
5.	"Packet Man" (Worth a Packet Remix)	Jacobs; George Clinton; William Collins; Glenn Goins	4:58
6.	"Arguin' on the Funk"	Jacobs; Brooks; David Elliot	3:50
Total length:			33:09

Sample credits

- Track 1 contains a sample taken from "Theme to the Black Hole" by Parliament.
- Track 2 is based on copyrighted adaptation of Lohengrin's "The Wedding March".
- Track 5 contains samples from the song "Foreplay" by Fred Wesley and the Horny Horns.

Notes

- Shock G appears as his alter ego Humpty Hump on all songs, except track 3, on which he appears as MC Blowfish.

== Personnel ==
- Gregory "Shock G" Jacobs — vocals, organ solo & synthesizer (track 1), acoustic piano & drum programming (track 2), sample arrangements (tracks: 1, 3), producer
- Jimi "Chopmater J" Dright — vocals (track: 2), (tracks: 1–4), producer
- Ronald "Money-B" Brooks — vocals (tracks: 1–3, 6), producer
- Tupac "2Pac" Shakur — vocals (tracks: 1, 3)
- Earl "Schmoovy-Schmoov" Cook — vocals (tracks: 1, 4)
- Kent Racker — vocals (track 2)
- "Bigg Money Odis" Brackens III — vocals (track 4)
- David "DJ Fuze" Elliot — turntables (tracks: 4, 6), producer
- Christopher John "CJ" Mackintosh — re-mixing (track 5)
- Atron Gregory — executive producer

== Charts ==
=== Weekly charts ===
Chart (1991)	Peak position
US Billboard 200	29
US Top R&B/Hip-Hop Albums (Billboard)	7

=== Year-end charts ===
Chart (1991)	Position
US Billboard 200	97

== Certifications ==
Region	Certification	Certified units/sales
United States (RIAA)	Gold	500,000^{^}
^{^} Shipments figures based on certification alone.
