= Future Rhythm =

Studio album by Digital Underground
- Released: June 4, 1996
- Recorded: 1995–1996
- Genre: West Coast hip hop
- Length: 54:49
- Labels: Critique; Radikal
- Producer: D-Flow Production Squad

Digital Underground chronology
The Body-Hat Syndrome (1993)	Future Rhythm (1996)	Who Got the Gravy? (1998)

Singles from Future Rhythm
- 1. "Oregano Flow" Released: 1996; 2. "Walk Real Kool" Released: 1996

Future Rhythm is the fourth studio album by the American hip hop group Digital Underground. It was released on June 4, 1996, via Critique/Radikal Records. The album was produced by the D-Flow Production Squad. It features guest appearances from Black Spooks, Luniz and the Del the Funky Homosapien. The album reached number 113 on the Billboard 200 and number 26 on the Top R&B/Hip-Hop Albums in the United States.

The album was supported with two singles: "Oregano Flow" and "Walk Real Kool", which peaked at numbers 75 and 95, respectively, on the US Billboard Hot R&B/Hip-Hop Songs chart. Songs "Food Fight" and "We Got More" were featured in Paris Barclay's film Don't Be a Menace to South Central While Drinking Your Juice in the Hood, with the latter ended up appearing in its soundtrack album.

== Critical reception ==
Professional ratings
Review scores
Source	Rating
AllMusic	2/5 stars
Rap Pages	8/10
The New Rolling Stone Album Guide	3.5/5 stars
The Source	3/5 stars

Mike Boehm of the Los Angeles Times wrote that the album "sports a nice, laid-back take on George Clinton's elaborately semi-chaotic P-Funk production approach." Jeff Niesel of The San Diego Union-Tribune opined that "the mellow grooves of 'Walk Real Kool', 'Future Rhythm' and 'Stylin'' simply fall flat."

== Track listing ==
No.	Title	Writer(s)	Length
1.	"Walk Real Kool"	Gregory Jacobs	3:53
2.	"Glooty-Us-Maximus"	Jacobs; Ronald Brooks; Reggie Gibson; Garrick Husbands; Jeremy Jackson; A. Parker; T. Allen	5:40
3.	"Oregano Flow" (Gumbo Soup Mix)	Jacobs; Brooks; Carl McIntosh; Jane Eugene; Steve Nichol	3:47
4.	"Fool Get a Clue" (featuring the Black Spooks)	Jacobs; Timothy Martin; Khari Butler; Michael Hampton; George Clinton	4:03
5.	"Rumpty Rump"	Jacobs; Brooks	1:01
6.	"Food Fight" (featuring Del the Funky Homosapien)	Jacobs; Teren Jones	3:59
7.	"Future Rhythm"	Jacobs; Shakeem Bocaj; Descaro Moore	3:52
8.	"Hokis Pokis (A Classic Case)"	Jacobs	5:21
9.	"We Got More" (featuring Luniz)	Jacobs; Husbands; Jerold Ellis	3:09
10.	"Hella Bump"	Jacobs; Bocaj	4:55
11.	"Stylin'"	Jacobs; Eric Baker; T. Allen; W. Harris	4:21
12.	"Midnite Snack"	Jacobs	0:57
13.	"Oregano Flow" (Hot Sauce Mix)	Jacobs	4:19
14.	"Want It All"	Jacobs; Brooks; M. Skeete; W. Williams	5:32
Total length:			54:49

Sample credits

- Track 3 contains elements from "Hangin' on a String (Contemplating)" by Loose Ends.
- Track 4 contains elements from "Funk Gets Stronger" by Funkadelic.

== Charts ==
Chart (1996)	Peak position
US Billboard 200	113
US Top R&B/Hip-Hop Albums (Billboard)	26
