= I Get Around (Tupac Shakur song) =

Single by 2Pac featuring Digital Underground

from the album Strictly 4 My N.I.G.G.A.Z...
- A-side: "Nothin' but Love"
- Released: June 10, 1993
- Recorded: 1992
- Genre: Hip-hop
- Length: 4:19
- Label: Interscope
- Songwriters: Tupac Shakur; Ronald Brooks
- Producer: The D-Flow Production Squad

2Pac singles chronology
"Gotta Get Mine" (1993)	"I Get Around" (1993)	"Keep Ya Head Up" (1993)

Digital Underground singles chronology
"No Nose Job" (1992)	"I Get Around" (1993)	"The Return of the Crazy One" (1993)

Music video
- "I Get Around" on YouTube

"I Get Around" is a song by American rapper 2Pac from his second studio album, Strictly 4 My N.I.G.G.A.Z... (1993). It was released on June 10, 1993, by Interscope Records as the album's second single and features Shakur's mentor Shock G and Money-B of Digital Underground, Shakur's old group. It was produced by Shock G, who produced it under the alias, The D-Flow Production Squad. AllMusic notes that in the song, Shakur "brags about his sexual conquests". Chart-wise, it was the album's most successful single, reaching numbers eleven and nine on the US Billboard Hot 100 and Cash Box Top 100.

== Composition and writing ==
According to both Money-B and Shock-G, the song originated as a sample and was originally intended to be used by Digital Underground. However, after six months the group could not compose lyrics that they felt were worthy of the sample. Shock-G initially offered the sample to bandmate Saafir when 2Pac began preparing his second studio album and needed material. Shock-G took the sample away from Saafir and gave it to Shakur, inflaming tensions between Shakur and Saafir, who had fallen out previously.

Shakur had asked his former bandmates to guest star on the track, but was concerned that neither of his bandmates would have time to write their own lyrics, so Shakur ghostwrote lyrics for Shock-G and Money-B. Shock-G's verse, as written by Shakur, would appear unaltered on the final version, but Money-B opted to write and perform his own lyrics, which Shock-G produced. The original third verse (sung by Shakur) appears on a remix featured on Death Row Greatest Hits.

== Commercial success ==
"I Get Around" peaked at number 11 on the US Billboard Hot 100. It spent 25 weeks on the chart, and also peaked at number nine on the Cash Box Top 100 and number five on the Billboard R&B chart. The single was certified gold by the Recording Industry Association of America (RIAA) on December 7, 1993 and sold 700,000 copies.

The song was then certified platinum on March 31, 2021.

Publication	Country	Accolade	Year	Rank
The Source	United States	The 100 Best Rap Singles of All Time	1998	*
Ego Trip	United States	Hip Hop's 40 Greatest Singles by Year 1980-98	1999	6
Blender	United States	Top 500 Songs of the 80s-00s	2005	307
Bruce Pollock	United States	The 7,500 Most Important Songs of 1944-2000	2005	*
Pitchfork	United States	The Pitchfork 500	2008	*
Pitchfork	United States	Top 200 Tracks of the 1990s	2010	107

== Music video ==
The accompanying music video for "I Get Around" was directed by American director, producer and screenwriter David Dobkin and filmed in Malibu, California on March 19, 1993.

== Live performances ==
Shakur performed the song live on The Arsenio Hall Show on July 19, 1993. He performed it on MTV Jams on July 28, 1993. He also performed the song live on January 4, 1996 at Gund Arena in Cleveland during the Tribute to Eazy-E tour.

== Track listing ==
- 12"
1. "I Get Around" (LP version) – 4:19
2. "I Get Around" (vocal version) – 6:07
3. "Nothing but Love" – 5:04
4. "I Get Around" (remix) – 6:06
5. "I Get Around" (remix instrumental) – 6:04
6. "I Get Around" (7" remix) – 3:36

- 12"
1. "I Get Around" (remix) – 6:06
2. "I Get Around" (7" remix) – 3:36
3. "Holler If Ya Hear Me" (Broadway mix) – 4:31
4. "Flex" (featuring: Dramacydal) – 4:19
- 12"
1. "I Get Around" (LP version) – 4:19
2. "Keep Ya Head Up" (radio version) – 4:25
3. "Keep Ya Head Up" (LP version) – 4:25
4. "I Get Around" (radio version) – 4:19
- CD
1. "I Get Around" (LP version) – 4:19
2. "I Get Around" (7" remix) – 3:36
- CD
1. "I Get Around" (extra clean version) – 4:19

== Charts ==
=== Weekly charts ===
Chart (1993–1994)	Peak position
US Billboard Hot 100	11
US Hot R&B/Hip-Hop Songs (Billboard)	5
US Hot Rap Songs (Billboard)	8
US Maxi-Singles Sales (Billboard)	2
US Rhythmic Airplay (Billboard)	7
US Cash Box Top 100	9

=== Year-end charts ===
Chart (1993)	Position
US Billboard Hot 100	56
US Hot R&B/Hip-Hop Songs (Billboard)	27

== Certifications ==
Region	Certification	Certified units/sales
New Zealand (RMNZ)	Platinum	30,000^{‡}
United States (RIAA)	Platinum	1,000,000^{‡}
^{‡} Sales+streaming figures based on certification alone.
