= Tupac: Resurrection =

2003 documentary film by Lauren Lazin

- Theatrical release poster
- Directed by: Lauren Lazin
- Produced by: Lauren Lazin; Preston Holmes; Karolyn Ali
- Starring: Tupac Shakur
- Cinematography: Jon Else
- Edited by: Richard Calderon
- Music by: Tupac Shakur
- Production companies: MTV Films; Amaru Entertainment
- Distributed by: Paramount Pictures
- Release dates: January 22, 2003 (Sundance); November 14, 2003 (United States)
- Running time: 111 minutes
- Country: United States
- Language: English
- Budget: $300,000
- Box office: $7.8 million

Tupac: Resurrection is a 2003 American documentary film about the life and death of rapper and actor Tupac Shakur. The film, directed by Lauren Lazin and released by Paramount Pictures, is narrated by Shakur himself.

Tupac: Resurrection premiered at the 2003 Sundance Film Festival on January 22, 2003, and was released in the United States by Paramount Pictures on November 14, 2003. As of July 1, 2008, it had earned over $7.8 million, making it the 21st-highest-grossing documentary film in the United States - (in nominal dollars, from 1982 to the present). The film was nominated for the Academy Award for Best Documentary Feature at the 77th Academy Awards.

== Synopsis ==
Tupac details his childhood, from growing up with a mother addicted to crack to being taken care of by drug dealers on the streets, as well as the type of jobs he had to do to make money. He also talks about his love for poetry, his friendship with Jada, what his lyrics mean, and about the negative resentment the media has had on him. This documentary then details his shooting, his reaction to getting shot, his paranoia after getting shot, and ultimately his death. The documentary ends with Tupac coming to terms with his life and his past, understanding the wrongs that he has done, as well as giving a monologue about stereotypes of black men, telling black people to not give in to stereotypes and to find self-control. It ends with showing the impact Tupac has had on the entire world after his passing.

== Reception ==
=== Critical response ===
Tupac: Resurrection has an approval rating of 78% on review aggregator website Rotten Tomatoes, based on 90 reviews, and an average rating of 6.75/10. The website's critical consensus states, "There's no question where the director's loyalty lies in this one-sided tribute; however, Tupac's charisma makes this doc an engaging sit". Metacritic assigned the film a weighted average score of 66 out of 100, based on 33 critics, indicating "generally favorable reviews".

== Accolades ==
- 2005: Academy Award for Best Documentary Feature (nomination)
- 2004: Black Reel Award for Best Film (nomination)

== Soundtrack ==
An official 14-track soundtrack album was released, although it only contained nine songs that featured in the movie. The following tracks, listed alphabetically by title, are written and/or performed by Tupac and feature in the film:

- 2 of Amerikaz Most Wanted
- Ballad of a Dead Soulja
- Black Jesuz
- Breathin
- Brenda's Got a Baby
- California Love Remix
- Can U C the Pride in the Panther - Performed by Mos Def
- Case of the Misplaced Mic
- Changes
- Cradle to the Grave
- Dear Mama
- Everything They Owe
- Fame
- Family Tree - Performed by Lamar Antwon Robinson
- Hail Mary
- Hell 4 a Hustler
- Hit 'Em Up
- Holler If Ya Hear Me
- Homeboyz
- I Get Around
- I'm Gettin Money
- If I Die 2 Nite
- Keep Ya Head Up
- Let Em Have It
- Letter to the President
- Lil' Homies
- Me Against the World
- Military Minds
- My Block (Nitty Remix)
- My Closest Roaddogz
- Never B Peace (Nitty Remix)
- Niggaz Nature Remix
- Nothin' to Lose
- One Day at a Time (Em's Version)
- Only Fear of Death
- Open Fire
- Outlaw
- Panther Power
- Part Time Mutha
- The Realist Killas
- Rebel of the Underground
- Runnin' (Dying to Live)
- Same Song – Performed by Digital Underground
- Secretz of War
- So Many Tears
- St. Ides Malt Liquor Commercial
- Starin' Through My Rear View
- Still Ballin' (Nitty Remix)
- Street Fame (Briss Remix)
- Strictly for My N.I.G.G.A.Z.
- Super Freak
- Temptations
- Thug N U Thug N Me
- Thugz Mansion (7 Remix)
- Trapped
- U Can Call (Jazze Pha Remix)
- Under Pressure
- Until the End of Time
- U R Ripping Us Apart!!! - Performed by Dead Prez
- When Thugz Cry
- When We Ride on Our Enemies (Briss Remix)
- Wife 4 Life - 4th Avenue Jones'
- Wonda Why They Call U Bitch
- Worldwide Mob Figgaz
- Y'all Don't Know Us
- You Don't Bring Me Flowers (feat. Ice T)

The following tracks, which Tupac had no input on, are also featured in the film:

- America the Beautiful
- All Along the Watchtower - Jimi Hendrix
- All That You Have Is Your Soul - Tracy Chapman
- Black Seeds Keep on Growing
- Exodus - Bob Marley
- Humpty Dance - Digital Underground
- Inner City Blues - Marvin Gaye
- Know the Ledge - Eric B. & Rakim
- Living for the City - Stevie Wonder
- Paid in Full - Eric B. & Rakim
- Parents Just Don't Understand - DJ Jazzy Jeff & the Fresh Prince
- Smooth Operator - Sade
- Vincent - Don McLean
- Waiting for You - Tony! Toni! Tone!
- Wuthering Heights - Kate Bush

== Certifications ==
Region	Certification	Certified units/sales
United Kingdom (BPI) video	Platinum	50,000^{*}
United Kingdom (BPI) soundtrack	Gold	100,000^{*}
^{*} Sales figures based on certification alone.
