= Sons of the P =

Studio album by Digital Underground
- Released: October 15, 1991
- Recorded: 1991
- Studio: Starlight Sound (Richmond, CA); Unique Recording (New York, NY); Axiom Recorders (Tampa, FL); The Disc Ltd. (Detroit, MI)
- Genre: West Coast hip hop
- Length: 1:04:40
- Label: Tommy Boy
- Producer: The Underground Production Squad

Digital Underground chronology
| This Is an EP Release (1991) | Sons of the P (1991) | The Body-Hat Syndrome (1993) |

Singles from Sons of the P
- 1. "Kiss You Back" Released: October 21, 1991; 2. "No Nose Job" Released: February 15, 1992

Sons of the P is the second studio album by American hip hop group Digital Underground. It was released on October 15, 1991, via Tommy Boy Records. The recording sessions took place at Starlight Sound in Richmond, with additional recordings done at Unique Recording Studios in New York, Axiom Recorders in Tampa, and The Disc Ltd. in Detroit. The album was produced by the Underground Production Squad. It features contributions from George Clinton, Stretch, and Treach.

The album peaked at number 44 on the Billboard 200 and number 23 on the Top R&B/Hip-Hop Albums in the United States. It was certified Gold by the Recording Industry Association of America on April 9, 1992, for selling 500,000 copies.

Its lead single, "Kiss You Back", reached No. 40 on the Billboard Hot 100, No. 13 on the Hot R&B/Hip-Hop Songs and No. 5 on the Hot Rap Songs, receiving Gold status by the RIAA on March 5, 1992. The song featured multi-layered choruses and background vocals sung by Boni Boyer, who briefly worked with D.U. shortly after her stint with Prince's Sign o' the Times/Lovesexy band.

The second single from the album, "No Nose Job", did not reach the Billboard Hot 100, however it made it to No. 28 on the Hot R&B/Hip-Hop Songs and No. 27 on the Hot Rap Songs.

George Clinton, who participated in the writing and recording of the title track, contributed vocals, marking one of his earliest studio guest appearances on a hip hop release, preceded only by Kurtis Blow's 1986 song "Magilla Gorilla".

== Critical reception ==
Professional ratings
Review scores
| Source | Rating |
|---|---|
| AllMusic | 4.5/5 stars |
| Robert Christgau | (3-star Honorable Mention) |
| PopMatters | 7/10 |
| RapReviews | 8/10 |
| The New Rolling Stone Album Guide | 4/5 stars |
| The Source | 3.5/5 stars |

Musician said that "this hour of power pulses with fat, spacious grooves, the kind you feel from head to toe...Throughout, funk serves as a truth ray, zapping racism and hypocrisy with thumping beats". Q critic gave the album 3 stars out of 5, saying that the album "had booty-shifting basslines to rival George Clinton and some engagingly daft lyrics". In his "Consumer Guide" column for The Village Voice, Robert Christgau wrote that "you can wear out the hard and the brother-brother-brother, but you can't wear out the cosmic slop", highlighting songs "The DFLO Shuffle" and "Kiss You Back". In retrospective reviews, DJ Fatboy of RapReviews compared the album to the group's previous work, saying "Sex Packets is the more popular album, but Sons of the P is the more worthwile offering", stating "album expands and goes deeper than its predecessor, and to this day, still stands as the best effort Digital Underground ever put on wax".

== Track listing ==
| No. | Title | Writer(s) | Length |
|---|---|---|---|
| 1. | "The DFLO Shuttle" | Gregory Jacobs; Ramone Gooden; Deon Evans; Tupac Shakur | 5:13 |
| 2. | "Heartbeat Props" | Jacobs; Gooden; George Clinton; DeWayne McKnight; Pete Bishop | 7:28 |
| 3. | "No Nose Job" | Jacobs | 4:59 |
| 4. | "Sons of the P" (featuring George Clinton) | Jacobs; Earl Cook; Clinton; Ronald Brooks | 9:05 |
| 5. | "Flowin' on the D-Line" | Jacobs; Jeremy Jackson | 3:05 |
| 6. | "Kiss You Back" | Jacobs; Brooks; Clinton; Philippé Wynne | 6:11 |
| 7. | "Tales of the Funky" | Stuart Jordan; Cook; Clinton; Walter Morrison; Garry Shider | 5:31 |
| 8. | "The Higher Heights of Spirituality" | Jacobs; Marlon Kemp | 0:48 |
| 9. | "Family of the Underground" (featuring Stretch and Treach) | Jacobs; Shirley Tabor; Ronald Everett; Elijah Williams; Ken Waters; Randy Walker; Donald Miller; Keith Jenkins; James Davis; Lee Spiller; Warren Williams; Anthony Criss; Sylvester Stewart | 5:47 |
| 10. | "The D-Flowstrumental" | Jacobs; Evans | 4:53 |
| 11. | "Good Thing We're Rappin'" | Jacobs | 11:36 |
| Total length: | | | 1:04:40 |

Sample credits

- Track 2 contains a sample of "Freak of the Week" as performed by Funkadelic.
- Track 6 contains a sample of "(Not Just) Knee Deep" as performed by Funkadelic.
- Track 7 contains a sample of "One Nation Under a Groove" as performed by Funkadelic.
- Track 9 contains a sample of "Family Affair" as performed by Sly and the Family Stone.

== Personnel ==
- Gregory "Shock G" Jacobs — rap vocals, singing, acoustic piano, digital keyboards, synthesizer, drum programming, sampler, sequencing, producer, mixing, executive producer, concept, illustration
- Ronald "Money-B" Brooks — rap vocals
- Ramone "Pee-Wee" Gooden — rap vocals, singing, digital keyboards, synthesizer
- Blocko — rap vocals, singing
- Randy "Stretch" Walker — rap vocals
- Tupac "2Pac" Shakur — rap vocals
- "Bigg Money Odis" Brackens III — rap vocals
- Stuart "Shorty B" Jordan — rap vocals
- Descaro "Mack Mone" Moore — rap vocals
- Mark "M.C. Clever" Moore — rap vocals
- Shirley "Shassiah" Tabor — rap vocals
- Ronald "Omar" Everett — rap vocals
- Ken "Kenny K" Waters — rap vocals
- Master Mind — rap vocals
- D-Love — rap vocals
- O.B. — rap vocals
- The God Rakiem — rap vocals
- George Clinton Jr. — singing
- Earl "Schmoovy-Schmoov" Cook — singing
- Boni Boyer — singing
- Roniece Levias — singing
- Jeremy "Jay-Z" Jackson — additional vocals, drum programming, sampler, sequencing, turntables (track 5)
- Marlon "Dr. Illenstein" Kemp — additional vocals, concept
- Anthony "Treach" Criss — additional vocals
- Otis Dunn — additional vocals
- The Conditioner — guitar
- Juan Carlos — live percussion
- Deon "Big D the Impossible" Evans — drum programming, sampler, sequencing
- David "DJ Fuze" Elliot — turntables
- 2Fly-Eli — turntables (track 9)
- Darrin Harris — recording & mixing (tracks: 1–4, 6–11)
- Steve Counter — recording (tracks: 1–4, 6–11)
- Marc Senasac — recording & mixing (track 5)
- Jeff Gray — mixing assistant (tracks: 1–4, 6–11)
- Lynn Levy — mixing assistant (tracks: 1–4, 6–11)
- Malcolm Sherwood — recording & mixing assistant (track 5)
- Atron Gregory — executive producer
- Mark Weinberg — art direction
- Victor Hall — cover photo

== Charts ==
=== Weekly charts ===
| Chart (1991-1992) | Peak position |
|---|---|
| Australian Albums (ARIA) | 145 |
| US Billboard 200 | 44 |
| US Top R&B/Hip-Hop Albums (Billboard) | 23 |

=== Year-end charts ===
| Chart (1992) | Position |
|---|---|
| US Top R&B/Hip-Hop Albums (Billboard) | 78 |

== Certifications ==
| Region | Certification | Certified units/sales |
|---|---|---|
| United States (RIAA) | Gold | 500,000^{^} |
^{^} Shipments figures based on certification alone.
