= The Lost Files (Digital Underground album) =

Compilation album by Digital Underground
- Released: October 26, 1999
- Genre: West Coast Rap
- Length: N/A
- Label: Lil Butta
- Producer: Digital Underground

Digital Underground chronology
The Lost Files (1999)	No Nose Job: The Legend of Digital Underground (2001)

Professional ratings
Review scores
Source	Rating
AllMusic	2.5/5 stars

The Lost Files is an album by rap group Digital Underground, released in 1999. It features unreleased tracks that were not included on previous albums.

== Track listing ==
1. "On One"
2. "X For the Ear"
3. "People Over the Stairs"
4. "Mind Bubble"
5. "Voodoo Woman"
6. "How Long"
7. "Nothing has Changed"
8. "Phone Call Away"
9. "Strawberry Letter 23"
10. "I Been Watching You"
11. "Know Me Feel Me"
