= Same Song =

Single by Digital Underground

from the album Nothing but Trouble soundtrack and This Is an EP Release
- Released: January 3, 1991
- Recorded: 1990
- Genre: Alternative hip-hop; comedy hip-hop; West Coast hip-hop
- Label: Tommy Boy; Warner Bros.
- Songwriters: Gregory Jacobs; Ronald Brooks; Tupac Shakur
- Producer: Shock G

Digital Underground singles chronology
"The Humpty Dance" (1990)	"Same Song" (1991)	"Kiss You Back" (1991)

2Pac singles chronology
"'Same Song'" (1991)	"Trapped" (1991)

Music video
- "Same Song" on YouTube

"Same Song" is a song by American rap group Digital Underground—featuring American rapper 2pac in his recording debut—from the soundtrack for the movie, Nothing But Trouble. The song is included on their EP album, This Is an EP Release, as well as on the Tupac: Resurrection soundtrack.

The video starts off with a hearse driving into a drive-in theater, showing clips from Nothing but Trouble. The Digital Underground crew leaves the hearse. Shock G, portraying an American rock musician, raps the first verse. Shock G's alter ego, Humpty Hump—alternately portraying an Arab, an Asian, and an Eskimo—raps the second and fifth verses. Money B, portraying an orthodox Jew, raps the third verse. Shock G raps the fourth verse, portraying a Jamaican rasta, and Tupac raps the final verse, portraying an African king.

Dan Aykroyd appears, portraying a Scottish bagpipe artist, as well as a Los Angeles gang member and a man in middle eastern clothing, while Dr. Dre and Eazy-E also make cameo appearances. Aykroyd's appearance is because Same Song is featured on the soundtrack of his Nothing but Trouble film, and Digital Underground also has a cameo appearance in the movie.

== Charts ==
Chart (1991)	Peak position
US Radio Songs (Billboard)	61
US Dance Club Songs (Billboard)	15
