= One Day at a Time (Em's Version) =

Promotional single by Tupac and Eminem featuring Outlawz

from the album Tupac: Resurrection
- Released: March 22, 2004
- Genre: Hip hop; gangsta rap
- Length: 3:46
- Label: Interscope
- Songwriters: Tupac Shakur; Marshall Mathers
- Producer: Eminem

"One Day at a Time (Em's Version)" is a song by American rappers 2Pac and Eminem from the 2003 soundtrack album Tupac: Resurrection: The Original Soundtrack. The track is Eminem's remix of the unreleased original, recorded in 1996, which features both Shakur and American rapper Spice 1. Eminem's version replaces Spice 1's vocals with newly recorded vocals from himself and the Outlawz. The song was released as a 12" promo single in 2004, no official music video was ever created. It charted at #80 on The Billboard Hot 100, number 55 in the RNB chart and 22 in rap singles. It also peaked at 134 in the UK.

== Critical reception ==
Allmusic wrote positively: "For one, she (Afeni Shakur) outsources the new productions to a trustworthy producer on a hot streak, Eminem, who works his magic on a trio of tracks: "Ghost," the powerful album opener; "One Day at a Time (Em's Version)," a thoughtful posse track with Em and the Outlawz." Rapreviews was also proud: "Eminem takes a far more direct role on his revision of the Outlawz song "One Day at a Time," adding a verse of his own to the song."

== Track listing ==
No.	Title	Writer(s)	Producer(s)	Length
1.	"One Day at a Time (Em's Version)" (with Eminem featuring Outlawz) (clean version)	Tupac Shakur; Marshall Mathers; Delray Richardson	Eminem	3:46
2.	"One Day at a Time (Em's Version)" (with Eminem featuring Outlawz) (dirty version)	Shakur; Mathers; Richardson	Eminem	3:46
3.	"One Day at a Time (Em's Version)" (with Eminem featuring Outlawz) (instrumental)	Shakur; Mathers; Richardson	Eminem	3:46
Total length:				11:18

== Charts ==
Chart (2004)	Peak position
US Billboard Hot 100	80
