= ..Cuz a D.U. Party Don't Stop! =

Studio album by Digital Underground
- Released: May 20, 2008
- Recorded: 2007–2008
- Genre: Hip hop
- Length: 56:49
- Label: Jake Records
- Producer: Digital Underground

Digital Underground chronology
Who Got the Gravy? (1998)	..Cuz a D.U. Party Don't Stop! (2008)	The Greenlight EP (2010)

..Cuz a D.U. Party Don't Stop! is the sixth and final studio album released by the rap group Digital Underground. The album was released on May 20, 2008, ten years after the group's fifth studio effort, Who Got the Gravy?, and two months after the group disbanded. This album also featured more debuts of new members such as Young Mass, Too Fly Eli, and Fifth Element.

== Track listing ==
No.	Title	Length
1.	"Eat Boiled Peanutz"	1:29
2.	"Who's Bumpin'"	5:26
3.	"Cali Boogie"	3:15
4.	"Lettuce in the Club"	3:22
5.	"More Manure"	3:48
6.	"Blue Skyy"	4:52
7.	"Hoo's Hoo"	1:36
8.	"Meeheadsoon"	3:23
9.	"Soundcheckin'"	1:12
10.	"Step Up"	3:47
11.	"Thuglife Party"	1:52
12.	"Family Freestyles"	5:20
13.	"Channel Surfin'"	1:17
14.	"All About You"	2:44
15.	"Children of the Sun"	3:50
16.	"Four One Four"	4:14
17.	"Everything Ya Done 4 Me"	3:39
18.	"Sex Packets Unplugged"	4:04
