= Shock G =

American rapper (1963–2021)

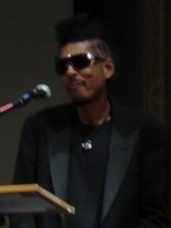
- Shock G in 2006

Background information
- Also known as: Humpty Hump; Piano Man; Rackadelic; Shah-G; MC Starchild; MC Blowfish; Gregory Racker; Icey Mike; Peanut Hakeem
- Born: Gregory Edward Jacobs; August 25, 1963; New York City, U.S.
- Origin: Oakland, California, U.S.
- Died: April 22, 2021 (aged 57) Tampa, Florida, U.S.
- Genres: West Coast hip-hop; alternative hip-hop; funk; psychedelic rap
- Occupations: Rapper; musician; singer; record producer; entertainer; cartoonist
- Instruments: Vocals; piano; keyboards
- Years active: 1984–2021
- Labels: TNT; Tommy Boy
- Formerly of: Digital Underground

Gregory Edward Jacobs (born Gregory Edward Racker, August 25, 1963 – April 22, 2021), known professionally as Shock G and by his alter ego Humpty Hump, was an American rapper and musician who was best known as the lead vocalist of the hip-hop group Digital Underground. He was responsible for Digital Underground's "The Humpty Dance", 2Pac's breakthrough single "I Get Around", and he was a co-producer of 2Pac's debut solo album 2Pacalypse Now (1991).

== Early life, family, education and early career ==
Gregory Edward Racker was born on August 25, 1963, in Queens, New York City, New York. He spent most of his childhood in locations on the East Coast with his family, eventually settling in Tampa, Florida. As a drummer he won the 1978 "Most Talented" trophy at Greco Junior High School. As a result of his parents' divorce, he later relocated back to New York City, where he traded his drums in for a set of turntables upon discovering and marvelling over hip-hop while the art form was still in an underground developmental stage. He was mentored in the craft by his cousin Rene Negron (also known as DJ-Stretch), and their close friend Shawn Trone (also known as MC Shah-T of the parody-rap group No Face) who suggested Greg use the name "Shah-G". Jacobs liked the idea, but mistakenly thought his friend said Shock G, and began using that name instead.

He returned to Tampa less than two years later. He dropped out of Chamberlain High School and formed the Master Blasters, a mobile DJ crew which featured three DJs and four emcees at its height. They performed at parties and for crowds at Riverfront Park's outdoor Sunday gatherings, eventually capturing the interest of Tony Stone, a program director at radio station WTMP, the city's primary R&B station. Stone offered the 16-year-old Jacobs a job DJing on the air, and for a short while, as "Gregory Racker", he was the youngest radio personality in central Florida with a regular time slot. After being fired for playing the fifteen-minute-long album version of "(Not Just) Knee Deep" by Funkadelic in a five-minute time slot, and also after tensions with his father escalated, Jacobs found himself backpacking the United States for a few years, drifting through odd jobs and petty criminal adventures. It was during this phase of his life that his focus switched from DJing to keyboard playing, and while utilizing piano practice-rooms at music stores and colleges around the country, he effectively taught himself to play the piano.

Deciding to pursue music seriously, he returned home, obtained his high school diploma and began attending Hillsborough Community College (HCC), where he studied music theory under Jim Burge and piano under Patricia J. Trice. At HCC, he met and formed a bond with Kenneth Waters, and the two began performing together under various names including The Chill Factor, and also The Four Horsemen, which included MC Skoobie-D, and the MD Dazzlin Doc-P who had recently moved to Tampa from the Bronx. In 1985, after two years of producing local artists for hire, playing solo piano gigs around town, performing with Waters, and being a keyboardist in Warren Allen Brooks' band, Jacobs and his aspiring-actress girlfriend Davita Watts eloped to Los Angeles in search of greater opportunity. In LA, he played keyboards in Kenny McCloud's pop-funk band Onyx before relocating to the San Francisco Bay Area. He found work at Oakland music store, and where his group Digital Underground would form a few years later.

== Career ==
=== Digital Underground ===
Shock G formed Digital Underground along with Chopmaster J and Kenneth Waters (also known as Kenny-K) in Oakland, California. After around 15 months of unsuccessful negotiations with various small record companies, in 1988 the trio released a 12-inch single on Macola Records. It featured "Your Life's a Cartoon", with "Underwater Rimes" as the B-side. Both songs were penned, produced, and performed by Jacobs, who sketched the cartoonish cover illustrations. The record included the logo for Digital Underground's startup label, TNT, as well as Macola's logo. TNT was founded by Tupac Shakur's management CEO Atron Gregory. In 1989, the group signed with Tommy Boy Records and released "Doowutchyalike", receiving minimal radio airplay but becoming an underground hit. Its video was more successful, reaching number 40 on the MTV's top 100 videos of the year. "Doowutchyalike" paved the way for Digital Underground's debut studio album Sex Packets and the highest-charting song of their career "The Humpty Dance", both released in early 1990, and each achieving platinum sales certifications by the Recording Industry Association of America (RIAA). The latter was rapped by Humpty Hump, the most flamboyant of Shock G's several alter egos. By that time, Digital Underground had expanded significantly, with DJ Fuze, Money-B, and Schmoovy-Schmoov joining the group, and with Ramone "Pee Wee" Gooden and Tupac Shakur joining by 1991.

=== Other identities ===
Jacobs performed under many aliases he developed over his career, resulting in characters that were maintained with such discipline that both fans and industry insiders believed they were separate people. While he rapped in his normal voice as Shock G, as "Humpty Hump" he adopted a more nasal sound as part of this character's exaggerated buffoonish persona that included garish clothes and Groucho glasses attached to a large, rubber nose. A fictional biography was included in Digital Underground's press kit stating that Humpty Hump's real name was Edward Ellington Humphrey III, and he wore the Groucho glasses after burning his nose in a deep fryer accident. Jacobs made public appearances as one person or the other, but at live shows and video shoots he would use a stand-in or camera tricks to maintain the illusion. Jacobs sometimes performed as other characters such as MC Blowfish, Icey-Mike, The Computer Woman, ButtaFly, and Peanut Hakeem.

=== Television and film work ===
Shock G's TV appearances include It's Showtime at the Apollo in 1992, several The Arsenio Hall Show performances between 1990 and 1994, and several live MTV performances, including MTV Spring Break 1990 in Daytona Beach, Yo! MTV Raps (performing live with Ed Lover and Doctor Dré) in 1991, Club MTV Live (with Downtown Julie Brown) in 1992, and "MTV Jams" in 1994. Most of these consisted of music performances with either Digital Underground or 2Pac; however, on an episode of the 1991 sitcom Drexell's Class, Jacobs played a small role as a furnace repairman. In the show's storyline, the title character, Otis Drexell, insists that the furnace repairman looks exactly like Humpty Hump, but neither he nor his coworker (Jason Priestley) have heard of any such hip-hop artist, especially not one with such a ridiculous name. The episode ends with a live performance of Digital Underground's "No Nose Job" on a cruise ship full of Sports Illustrated swimsuit models, which is presented as a scene from one of Drexell's dreams.

With his fellow Digital Underground group members, Jacobs appeared in the Dan Aykroyd–directed 1991 comedy film Nothing But Trouble appearing as both Shock G and Humpty Hump. The group (including Tupac Shakur) made a cameo music performance, as well as played a small role in the film as themselves. Jacobs has appeared in a handful of music documentaries, including Thug Angel: Life of an Outlaw (2000) about Tupac Shakur, and Parliament Funkadelic: One Nation Under a Groove (2005) about George Clinton & P-Funk, both of which received heavy TV rotation, and both of which relied heavily on Jacobs' commentary.

=== Production, solo work, and miscellaneous ===
In addition to his work with Digital Underground, Shock G found moderate success as a solo artist and music producer. In 1993, Shock G produced Tupac Shakur's breakthrough platinum single "I Get Around", as well as guest starred on the single and music video, and went on to produce Tupac's "So Many Tears" from his multi-platinum 1995 album Me Against the World. Tupac's first published work was while still a member of Digital Underground when he appeared on the 1991 song and video "Same Song", which also appeared in the Chevy Chase, Dan Aykroyd and Demi Moore film Nothing But Trouble. Shock co-produced Tupac's debut album 2Pacalypse Now. Shock G appeared as a producer and guest artist on fellow Oakland-based rap group The Luniz' platinum debut release Operation Stackola in 1995, also appearing as a guest emcee in the "I Got 5 on It (Bay Ballas Remix)" and video.

In 1996 the Wayans brothers' film Don't Be a Menace to South Central While Drinking Your Juice in the Hood features the Shock G song "We Got More". The song features Oakland rappers Luniz and is in three separate scenes of the film. It is featured in two places on the soundtrack. In 1998, Prince included the Shock G-produced "Love Sign" on his triple-CD Crystal Ball album. Shock G has toured and performed on stage with George Clinton and P-Funk, including a guest performance with Clinton at Woodstock 1999.

In 2003, Shock G produced the single "Risky Business" for Los Angeles underground artist Murs, and also appeared in the video, as himself and as Humpty Hump. Murs performed this song live with Shock G at the Paid Dues festival, and also featured him as his stage DJ/music conductor on a two-month extensive Definitive Jux label U.S. and Canada tour. On January 20, 2009, Shock G's single "Cherry Flava'd Email" was renamed and released as a special edition called "Cherry Flava'd Election" to commemorate the inauguration of President Barack Obama.

On June 24, 2011, Shock G was featured on an episode of the podcast You Had to Be There with comedians Nikki Glaser and Sara Schaefer.

== Death ==
On April 22, 2021, Jacobs was found dead in a motel room in Tampa, Florida, at age 57. On June 10, 2021, the Hillsborough County medical examiner announced that Shock G's death was caused by an accidental overdose of fentanyl, methamphetamine and ethanol (alcohol).

== Discography ==
=== Studio albums ===
- 2004 Fear of a Mixed Planet

=== Production discography ===
==== Digital Underground albums ====
- 1990 Sex Packets
- 1991 This Is an EP Release
- 1991 Sons of the P
- 1993 The Body-Hat Syndrome
- 1996 Future Rhythm
- 1998 Who Got the Gravy
- 1999 The Lost Files
- 2008 ..Cuz a D.U. Party Don't Stop!
- 2010 The Greenlight EP

==== Songs ====
- 1987 "Your Life's a Cartoon" — Digital Underground
- 1988 "Underwater Rimes" — Digital Underground
- 1989 "Doowutchyalike" — Digital Underground
- 1990 "Don't Funk Wid the Mo (Remix)" — Monie Love
- 1990 "Tellin' Time (Mike's Rap)" — Dr. Dre, Michael Concepcion
- 1990 "What I Won't Do for Love (Shock G Remix)" — 2Pac & Digital Underground (unreleased)
- 1991 "Rockin to the PM" — Raw Fusion
- 1991 "Rebel of the Underground"; Words of Wisdom; Tha' Lunatic — 2Pac
- 1993 "I Get Around" — 2Pac & Digital Underground
- 1993 "Get Away (Remix)" — Bobby Brown
- 1995 "So Many Tears"; "Fuck the World" — 2Pac & Shock G
- 1995 "P.Y.T."; "Swing It to the Left Side" — Smooth
- 1995 "Broke Hos"; "5150" — Luniz
- 1995 "Funk Session" — Too $hort & Shock G
- 1996 "We Got More" — Shock G & Luniz
- 1996 "Don't Ring My Bell" — Luniz
- 1996 "Gloomy Sunday" — Mystic
- 1996 "Nothing Has Changed", Digital Underground; "People Over the Stairs", Shock G; "Pick-a-Part", Clue; "Come N' Bounce", Shay
- 1997 "True Playas" — Whoridas
- 1997 "Cause I Had To" — & P-90 (unreleased)
- 1998 "Love Sign" — Prince
- 1998 "Broad Minded"; Sendin' You a Signal — Mr. No No
- 1999 "Crawl Before You Ball"; "Liquid Ho Magnet"; Running Man — Saafir
- 2000 "Do What Ya Want" — Rhythm & Green
- 2000 "Let the Beat Breathe" — Esinchill
- 2001 "Chassy" — Mac Mall
- 2002 "Bus Gus" — Metaphysical
- 2002 "God Cumz" — Mr. Next
- 2003 "Risky Business" — Murs
- 2004 "Smilin' Faces" — KRS-One

=== Guest appearances ===
- 1989 "Love Talk" — Tyler Collins
- 1990 "We're All in the Same Gang" — The West Coast Rap All-Stars
- 1990 "Time for Peace" — Davey-D, Paris, Tech & Sway
- 1991 "Trapped" — 2Pac
- 1991 "Throw Your Hands in the Air"; "Funkintoyoear" — Raw Fusion
- 1992 "Money" — Gold Money
- 1993 "I Get Around — 2Pac
- 1993 "Close the Crack House" — Professor X, Wise Intelligent, Big Daddy Kane, Chuck D
- 1993 "Rhythm & Rhyme" — George Clinton
- 1993 "Paint the White House Black" — George Clinton, Ice Cube, Kam, Yo-Yo, Dr. Dre, Public Enemy, Pupa Curly
- 1994 "Freaky Note"; "Do Your Homework"; "Dirty Drawls" — Raw Fusion
- 1994 "The Original Lesson" — Ben Sidran, Shock G
- 1995 "I Got 5 on It (Remix)"; 5150 — Luniz
- 1995 "Funk Session" — Too $hort
- 1995 "Fuck the World" — 2Pac
- 1995 "Black Book" — African Identity
- 1996 "Knee Deep (Deep as a Mutha Funker Remix)"; "Knee Deep (Midnight Mix)" — George Clinton
- 1996 "We Got More" — Luniz & Shock G
- 1999 "Glayz Donutt Face" — C-Funk
- 1999 "Miss Bartender" — Money-B
- 1999 "Crawl Before You Ball" — Saafir
- 2000 "No DNA" — Clee & Drank-a-Lot
- 2001 "Chassy" — Mac Mall
- 2002 "Wuz Crackulatin'," 2wice
- 2003 "Risky Business" — Murs
- 2003 "Way of Life" — Stylophonic
- 2003 "At the Next Show" — Sir Mix-a-lot
- 2004 "Snake and the Apple" — Stucky
- 2004 "Who's Microphone - The Humpty/Durty Remix" — Split 50
- 2005 "Career Finders" — Perceptionists
- 2005 "Say What You Say" — Soma Rasa
- 2005 "California Girls Dipped in Chocolate" — Slapbak
- 2005 "Freaky Pumps" — Fat Lip
- 2005 "City to City" — Straw
- 2005 "Love Letters" — 2Pac, Rappin' 4-Tay, Assassin
- 2006 "The Wizard" — Mr. Rakafela
- 2006 "If You're True"; "Pain and Misery (remix)" — InershA
- 2006 "Shock G Interlude" — 2Pac
- 2007 "Shock G's Outro/Hidden Track" — Assassin, Ray Luv, 2Pac
- 2007 "California Dreamin" — San Quinn, Assassin
- 2007 "Plainfield" — Prince Paul, Bernie Worrell
- 2008 "Crazy" — Maddie Lauer
- 2008 "Light of Love" — Yameen, Lady Alma
- 2018 "Heem" — Undaflow, Big Sharp
- 2019 "Keep It PI" — Cuttynclean JC feat. Mistah fab and Moe Green

=== Digital Underground videos ===
- "Doowutchyalike" (1989)
- "The Humpty Dance" (1989)
- "Doowutchyalike" (video remix) (1990)
- "Same Song" (1991)
- "Kiss You Back" (1991)
- "No Nose Job" (1992)
- "Return of the Crazy One" (1993)
- "Wussup Wit the Luv" (1994)
- "Oregano Flow" (1996)
- "Walk Real Kool" (1996)
- "Wind Me Up" (1998)

=== Featured guest video appearances ===
- "We're All in the Same Gang" (1990) Westcoast All-Stars
- "Throw Your Hands in the Air" (1991) Raw Fusion
- "Trapped" (1991) 2Pac
- "Money" (1992) Gold Money
- "Close the Crackhouse" (1992) X-Clan
- "I Get Around" (1993) 2Pac featuring Digital Underground
- "No Brothas Allowed" (1994) No Face
- "I Got 5 on It (Bay Ballas Remix)" (1995) Luniz
- "Temptations" (1995) 2Pac
- "Risky Business" (2003) Murs
- "Hit the Streets" (2003) Element
- "City to City" (2005) Straw the Vegas Don
- "Crazy" (2008) Maddie Lauer

=== DVDs ===
- Nothing But Trouble (1991)
- Thug Angel: The Life of an Outlaw (2000)
- Tupac: Resurrection (2003)
- Digital Underground: Raw and Uncut (2004)
- Parliament/Funkadelic; One Nation Under a Groove (2005)
