= Nothing but Trouble (1991 film) =

1991 film by Dan Aykroyd

- Theatrical release poster
- Directed by: Dan Aykroyd
- Screenplay by: Dan Aykroyd
- Story by: Peter Aykroyd
- Produced by: Robert K. Weiss
- Starring: Chevy Chase; Dan Aykroyd; John Candy; Demi Moore
- Cinematography: Dean Cundey
- Edited by: Malcolm Campbell; James R. Symons
- Music by: Michael Kamen
- Color process: Technicolor
- Production company: Applied Action
- Distributed by: Warner Bros.
- Release date: February 15, 1991
- Running time: 93 minutes
- Country: United States
- Language: English
- Budget: $45 million
- Box office: $8.4 million

Nothing but Trouble is a 1991 American comedy horror film written and directed by Dan Aykroyd in his directorial debut. Based on a story by Peter Aykroyd, it stars Dan Aykroyd and John Candy (both in dual roles) along with Chevy Chase and Demi Moore, and tells the tale of Chris Thorne and Diane Lightson, two yuppies (played by Chase and Moore) and Chris's clients Fausto and Renalda Squiriniszu, who are taken to court for running a stop sign in the bizarre, financially bankrupt hamlet of Valkenvania, which is dominated by the 106-year-old judge Alvin "J.P." Valkenheiser (played by Aykroyd).

Production began in 1990 under the title Git, which was changed in production to Valkenvania. Subsequently, prior to release, Warner Bros. changed the title to Nothing but Trouble; in a press statement released in December 1990, Aykroyd said that he preferred the Valkenvania title.

Upon release, the film was largely panned by critics for its humor, screenplay, tone, and direction, and was also a box-office bomb. Critics compared the film's tone to that of films such as Abbott and Costello Meet Frankenstein, Psycho, The Texas Chainsaw Massacre, The Rocky Horror Picture Show, and The Munsters. Aykroyd received the Golden Raspberry Award for Worst Supporting Actor at the 12th Golden Raspberry Awards.

== Plot ==
While hosting a party in his Manhattan penthouse, financial publisher Chris Thorne meets beautiful lawyer Diane Lightson, and agrees to escort her to consult client Howard Suntz in Atlantic City the following day. Two of Chris's clients, boisterous Brazilian billionaire siblings Fausto and Renalda Squiriniszu, overhear Chris planning the road trip with Diane and invite themselves along. During the trip, the Squiriniszus urge Chris to take a scenic detour off the drab New Jersey Turnpike, which ultimately places them in the dilapidated village of Valkenvania. After running a stop sign and subsequently attempting to outrun pursuing chief of police Dennis Valkenheiser, the group is captured and taken before his 106-year-old grandfather, Judge Alvin "J.P." Valkenheiser. At their hearing, Chris's dismissive and disrespectful attitude offends Judge Valkenheiser, and the yuppies are locked in a hidden room under the courthouse to be judged the next day. They later overhear Judge Valkenheiser mercilessly executing a group of convicted drug dealers in a deadly roller coaster nicknamed "Mr. Bonestripper".

Invited upstairs for dinner, the quartet learns that Judge Valkenheiser is detaining them due to his deep and longstanding grudge against "bankers", which he considers Chris to be. Judge Valkenheiser explains that in 1917, a financier from New York swindled his grandfather into mining out the town in exchange for shares in the now defunct United Coke Company, subsequently impoverishing both the family and the town. The group attempts an escape, but Judge Valkenheiser's massive mute granddaughter Eldona captures Chris and Diane. The Squiriniszus escape by jumping through a window, and make it to the edge of the property before encountering a waiting Dennis. Noticing that Dennis seems stressed and overworked, the Squiriniszus talk him into abandoning his dead-end life and career by escaping with them.

A series of trick hallways and booby traps land Chris and Diane in an attic room filled with IDs and news clippings, where the couple discover that Judge Valkenheiser has been using the house to capture and terminate undesirables—especially bankers—since the 1890s. During another escape down a series of slides, Diane lands in the property's salvage yard, where she meets and befriends Judge Valkenheiser's severely deformed grandchildren Bobo and L'il Debbull, who are barred from living in the house. Chris, still in the house, sneaks into Judge Valkenheiser's bedroom to explore, but Judge Valkenheiser discovers and attacks him. While attempting to flee from Judge Valkenheiser, Chris collides with Eldona. Judge Valkenheiser ceases his attack and declares Chris must marry Eldona per "house policy".

Meanwhile, in the court room, the alternative rap group Digital Underground, having been arrested for speeding, is ordered by Judge Valkenheiser to verify their claim of being musicians, which they do with an impromptu performance. Delighted, Judge Valkenheiser acquits the band, but then asks them to stay behind as musicians and witnesses for the wedding. Chris initially cooperates in exchange for his life, but is later caught pleading with the group to help him escape. The band departs without understanding Chris's plight, and an enraged Judge Valkenheiser sentences him to execution via "Mr. Bonestripper". The machine breaks down just before Chris is fed into it, and he escapes unscathed into the junkyard. Judge Valkenheiser attempts to lure Chris by abducting and trapping Diane in another murderous contraption known as the Gradertine, but Chris distracts the Valkenheisers by setting off an explosion, proceeding to retrieve Diane at the last second before the pair escapes the premises via a passing freight train.

After Chris and Diane report their ordeal to the authorities, the police prepare a large-scale raid of Judge Valkenheiser's courthouse. Chris and Diane are asked to accompany the police to Valkenvania only to discover that the troopers involved are fully aware of and allied with Judge Valkenheiser due to his ability to swiftly handle undesirables. Just as the combined forces are about to dispatch Chris and Diane for knowing too much, the massive underground coal fires roar out of control, finally destroying the courthouse, and the duo successfully escapes from the ensuing chaos.

In Brazil, Dennis, now the Squiriniszus' personal security detail and Renalda's lover, vows to shield the siblings from harm. Back in New York, Diane awakens Chris to the news broadcast of the Valkenvania disaster. Chris spots Judge Valkenheiser rummaging through the debris where he announces that he and the rest of his family survived. Brandishing Chris's driver's license, Judge Valkenheiser announces that they plan to move in with "grandson" Chris, who flees the scene, leaving a cartoonish hole in the wall.

== Cast ==
- Chevy Chase as Chris Thorne, a financial publisher
- Dan Aykroyd as:
  - Alvin "J.P." Valkenheiser, the 106-year-old judge who rules Valkenvania.
  - Bobo, the severely deformed grandson of Alvin who lives in Valkenvania's salvage yard with his twin brother, L'il Debbull.
- John Candy as:
  - Dennis Valkenheiser, the grandson of Alvin who is Valkenvania's chief of police.
  - Eldona Valkenheiser, the mute granddaughter of Alvin and the fraternal twin sister of Dennis who is an expert mechanic.
- Demi Moore as Diane Lightson, a lawyer Chris falls for.
- Valri Bromfield as Miss Purdah, the trigger-happy grandniece of Alvin and the cousin of Dennis and Eldona.
- Taylor Negron as Fausto Squiriniszu, a wealthy Brazilian.
- Bertila Damas as Renalda Squiriniszu, the sister of Fausto.
- Raymond J. Barry as FBI Agent Mark
- Brian Doyle Murray as FBI Agent Brian
- John Wesley as Sam
- Daniel Baldwin as Dealer #1
- John Daveikis as L'il Debbull, the severely deformed grandson of Alvin who lives with his twin brother, Bobo, in Valkenvania's salvage yard.

Dan's brother Peter makes a cameo early in the film as the doorman Mike. Dan's and Peter's father P.H. Aykroyd and Dan's daughter Danielle appear as porch people alongside Richard Kruk, producer Robert K. Weiss, and Dan's father-in-law Earl Dixon. Rap group Digital Underground has a minor role featuring a young Tupac Shakur.

== Style and interpretation ==
Entertainment Weekly, Vibe and Den of Geek described the film as a horror comedy. The Los Angeles Times critic Peter Rainer wrote, "The intention seems to be a slap-happy cross between Psycho and Abbott and Costello Meet Frankenstein". Lou Cedrone, writing for The Baltimore Sun, said that the film "plays like a comedy version of The Texas Chainsaw Massacre films." Candice Russel, writing for the Sun Sentinel, called Nothing but Trouble a "variation on The Rocky Horror Picture Show". The film's humor was described by critics as deriving from gross-out and sketch comedy. Nathan Rabin interpreted the plot as "[tapping] into a fear common among wealthy Manhattan yuppies: that once they leave the cozy confines of the five boroughs, inbred hillbillies will try to kill them for being wealthy Manhattan yuppies."

== Production ==
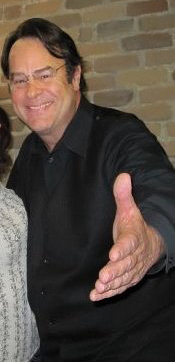
The film was comedian, writer and actor Dan Aykroyd's directorial debut.

=== Development ===
The story was developed after a screening of the 1987 film Hellraiser that producer Robert K. Weiss attended with Dan and Peter Aykroyd. Weiss had a fractured rib and suggested the three attend a film to take his mind off his injury, but that it could not be a comedy because it hurt him to laugh, hence the choice of a horror film. Once the screening started and the three saw the audience laughing, Weiss suggested that they make a horror comedy together, since audiences wanted to laugh and be scared simultaneously.

Peter Aykroyd relayed an event from 1978 in which Dan had been pulled over for speeding in upstate New York and was taken to the justice of the peace to stand trial in what Dan referred to as a "kangaroo court", and after he was fined $50, the justice of the peace invited Dan to stay for tea, and he ended up staying there for four hours. It was suggested that a horror story be developed based on this event, and Aykroyd spent six months writing it as a screenplay titled Git, which was later changed to Road to Ruin; Dan Aykroyd described the script as "a monster movie", comparing it to Beetlejuice and The Texas Chain Saw Massacre. Much of the bizarre characters and events, such as the giant mutant babies, were based on a series of dreams Aykroyd was having, and he set the story in the fictional town of Valkenvania, which was based loosely on the town of Centralia, Pennsylvania.

Aykroyd offered the script to John Hughes, who, while interested in the story, ultimately turned it down because he only directed his own scripts; Hughes received a special thanks credit. John Landis disliked the script and immediately turned it down. The script caught the attention of Warner Bros. Pictures, who wanted John Candy to costar. Aykroyd wanted to play the parts of Judge Alvin "J.P." Valkenheiser and Chris Thorne, but the studio wanted Chevy Chase as Thorne, and Aykroyd agreed. With no director attached, Aykroyd reluctantly agreed to direct the film to secure the deal. Aykroyd later agreed to play the giant adult baby Bobo as well, after no one else wanted to play the part, and found it stressful to play two parts in heavy makeup while simultaneously directing and producing. Warner Bros. had faith in Aykroyd, and gave him a $40 million budget. It ultimately went $5 million over, for a total of $45 million.

=== Filming ===
Production began on May 7, 1990, in Los Angeles, California, under the title Trickhouse. Two months later, on July 12, the title was changed to Valkenvania, and a release date was scheduled for Christmas 1990. The Valkenheiser mansion, Town Hall and other environments were constructed on two soundstages at Warner Bros. Studios; one of the set pieces, dubbed Autohenge, was a garden constructed of scrap metal. Designer William Sandell was inspired by his previous experience as a kinetic sculptor. The production designers acquired props and decorations from "every prop resource in town", as well as Aykroyd's personal collection. The Greystone Mansion in Beverly Hills was used to shoot the scenes depicting Chris Thorne's New York City apartment. Exteriors were also shot in the Lehigh Valley, 60 miles north of Philadelphia; second-unit photography occurred in Pennsylvania, New Jersey and New York City.

=== Music ===
The film score is composed by Michael Kamen.

Nothing but Trouble (Music from the Motion Picture Soundtrack)

Soundtrack album by various artists
- Released: March 5, 1991
- Recorded: 1990
- Label: Warner Bros. Records
- Producers: Michael Ostin (exec.); Gary LeMel (exec.); Peter Aykroyd; Shock G; Barry Beckett; Bob Crewe; Bruce Gowdy; Hank Williams Jr.; Jim Ed Norman; Madonna; Marty Paich; Michael Kamen; Ron Nevison; Shep Pettibone

Singles from Nothing but Trouble
- 1. "Same Song" Released: January 6, 1991

Professional ratings
Review scores
Source	Rating
AllMusic	2.5/5 stars

Nothing but Trouble (Music from the Motion Picture Soundtrack) was released in 1991 through Warner Bros. Records, with ten songs:

No.	Title	Producer(s)	Length
1.	"The Good Life" (performed by Ray Charles)	Marty Paich
2.	"Same Song" (performed by Digital Underground)	Shock G
3.	"Get Over" (performed by Nick Scotti)	Madonna; Shep Pettibone
4.	"Big Girls Don't Cry" (performed by Frankie Valli and the Four Seasons)	Bob Crewe
5.	"Tie the Knot" (performed by Digital Underground)	Shock G
6.	"Bonestripper" (performed by Damn Yankees)	Ron Nevison
7.	"Atlantic City (Is a Party Town)" (performed by Elwood Blues Revue)	Bruce Gowdy; Peter Aykroyd
8.	"La Chanka" (performed by Bertila Damas)	Peter Aykroyd; Beledo
9.	"I Mean I Love You" (performed by Hank Williams Jr.)	Barry Beckett; Hank Williams Jr.; Jim Ed Norman
10.	"Valkenvania Suite" (performed by Michael Kamen)	Michael Kamen

Other songs

Four songs used in the film were not included on the soundtrack album:

- "A Garden in the Rain" performed by Blue Barron
- "She's a Great, Great Girl" performed by Jack Teagarden
- "Wabash Cannonball" performed by Doc Watson
- "Helen Claire" performed by Michael Kamen

== Release ==
In December 1990, Warner Bros. changed the film's title to Nothing but Trouble. On December 20, Dan Aykroyd stated in a press release that he would always think of the film as Valkenvania. A promotional illustration by Boris Vallejo was commissioned in 1991. The film's release was delayed to recut for a PG-13 rating, removing the film's over the top violence, and the studio rescheduled The Bonfire of the Vanities to the Christmas release date.

The film was released on February 15, 1991. It opened at #8 in 1,671 theaters, grossing $3,966,240 opening weekend. The site lists its total gross upon completed release as $8,479,793, with a 50.5% drop-off in its second week of release.

=== Critical reception ===
Nothing but Trouble was panned by critics. Chris Hicks, writing for the Deseret News, wrote, "Though Aykroyd seems to be having the time of his life as the judge, Chase, Candy, and Moore appear much less animated than usual [and] downright embarrassed in some scenes". Writing for The New York Times, Vincent Canby criticized Aykroyd's script, believing its narrative had "loose ends", and said that "the movie looks less funny than expensive". The Hollywood Reporter criticized the film's comedy, considering it to be "skit-level". The Los Angeles Times critic Peter Rainer wrote, "If you're in the mood to be clobbered with stale jokes, it might seem fitfully amusing. Occasionally, the talents of the cast burn through the haze of misfires and remembered routines".

Lou Cedrone, writing for The Baltimore Sun, said that "if there is a laugh here, it goes by unnoticed". Chicago Tribune critic Dave Kehr wrote that "Valkenvania bids fair to become one of the legendary disasters of the movie business, a movie so unfunny, so distasteful and so painful to watch that you can't take your eyes off it". Jay Boyar, writing for the Orlando Sentinel wrote: "The problem is that the neophyte director appears to believe that being gross, in itself, is enough. Even John Waters, in his Pink Flamingos period, realized that wit was also necessary. Besides, Waters was genuinely outrageous in a startlingly original way. The grotesquerie of Aykroyd's film reminded me of a disturbed child trying to gross out a friend on the playground." Candice Russel, writing for the Sun Sentinel, wrote that "this mean-spirited effort by Aykroyd proves that he cannot write an effective comedy; if he's acting, he should leave the direction to someone else". The Washington Post writer Hal Hinson called the film "nothing but trouble and agony and pain and suffering and obnoxious, toxically unfunny bad taste; it's nothing but miserable".

Entertainment Weekly critic Michael Sauter wrote: "[Aykroyd and Candy] generate approximately four laughs. Chase adds maybe two. In movie-ticket terms, that's less than one laugh per dollar; as a video rental, it's a slightly better deal." The same publication printed a second review by Owen Gleiberman, writing: "Most of the jokes are so lame that Chevy Chase can't even be bothered to look nonchalant. A sadder excuse for a movie would be hard to imagine." Writing for People, Ralph Novak wrote that "after a few minutes, it's clear that this comedy is not enigmatic—just hopelessly confused". Empire writer Jo Berry wrote: "Unfortunately this isn't even half as fun as the shortest bumper-car ride, with the cast lost in a sea of unfunny situations and badly executed antique jokes on loan from The Munsters all obviously puzzled about why they are actually there." A staff review in Variety opined, "it's a good bet a film is in trouble when the highlight comes from seeing John Candy in drag"; while TV Guide stated, "Aykroyd's film has a relentless imbecility that allows it to stand with films such as Bela Lugosi Meets a Brooklyn Gorilla, John Goldfarb, Please Come Home! and Which Way to the Front? as one of the worst attempts at comedy ever filmed". Roger Ebert famously hated Nothing But Trouble so much that he refused to write a review for it after giving the movie an emphatic "Thumbs Down" and actually wanted a few noisy teenagers to make even more noise so he would not hear any more of the movie while watching it in the theater auditorium. His At the Movies partner, Gene Siskel, also gave the film an emphatic "Thumbs Down" on their program.

On Rotten Tomatoes, the film has an approval rating of 15% based on reviews from 26 critics. The site's consensus states: "There's nothing good in Nothing But Trouble, a grotesque comedy that is more likely to make audiences ill than make them laugh". On Metacritic, the film has a score of 13 out of 100 based on 16 reviews, indicating "overwhelming dislike". Audiences polled by CinemaScore gave an average grade of "D+" on an A+ to F scale. Nathan Rabin, in his "My Year of Flops" segment for The A.V. Club in 2007, wrote: "Aykroyd here has lovingly, meticulously created a hideous, grotesque nightmare world nobody in their right mind would want to visit the first time around, let alone return to." Thirteen years later however, Rabin stated that he came to appreciate the film, one that he felt worked best once he rejected seeing it as a comedy and instead saw it as "a nightmare-inducing, viscerally unsettling horror movie and meditation of the malevolent cult of Chevy Chase, formerly funny actor, sketch performer and famously terrible human being."

IGN named Nothing but Trouble as Dan Aykroyd's worst film. The film has also received praise, with Complex listing Nothing but Trouble as one of "25 Underrated 90s Comedies"; staff writer Matt Barone called it "a strangely magnetic cluster-fuck of a high-concept comedy". IFC listed Nothing but Trouble as one of "10 '90s Comedies That Really Need Sequels".

=== Accolades ===
In 1992, at the 12th Golden Raspberry Awards, Aykroyd received the Golden Raspberry Award Worst Supporting Actor, where the film was also nominated for Worst Picture, Worst Actress (Demi Moore for this film and The Butcher's Wife), Worst Supporting Actress (John Candy in drag), Worst Director and Worst Screenplay. It also took home Worst Picture at the 1991 Stinkers Bad Movie Awards.

=== Response from cast and crew ===
Bertila Damas said she enjoyed working with Demi Moore and Taylor Negron, but did not get along with Chase, who has a reputation for being difficult to work with. Dan Aykroyd defended the movie in a 2024 interview, calling it "a fun, very serviceable comedy" that was doomed by opening against The Silence of the Lambs and Sleeping with the Enemy.
