= Money-B =

American rapper

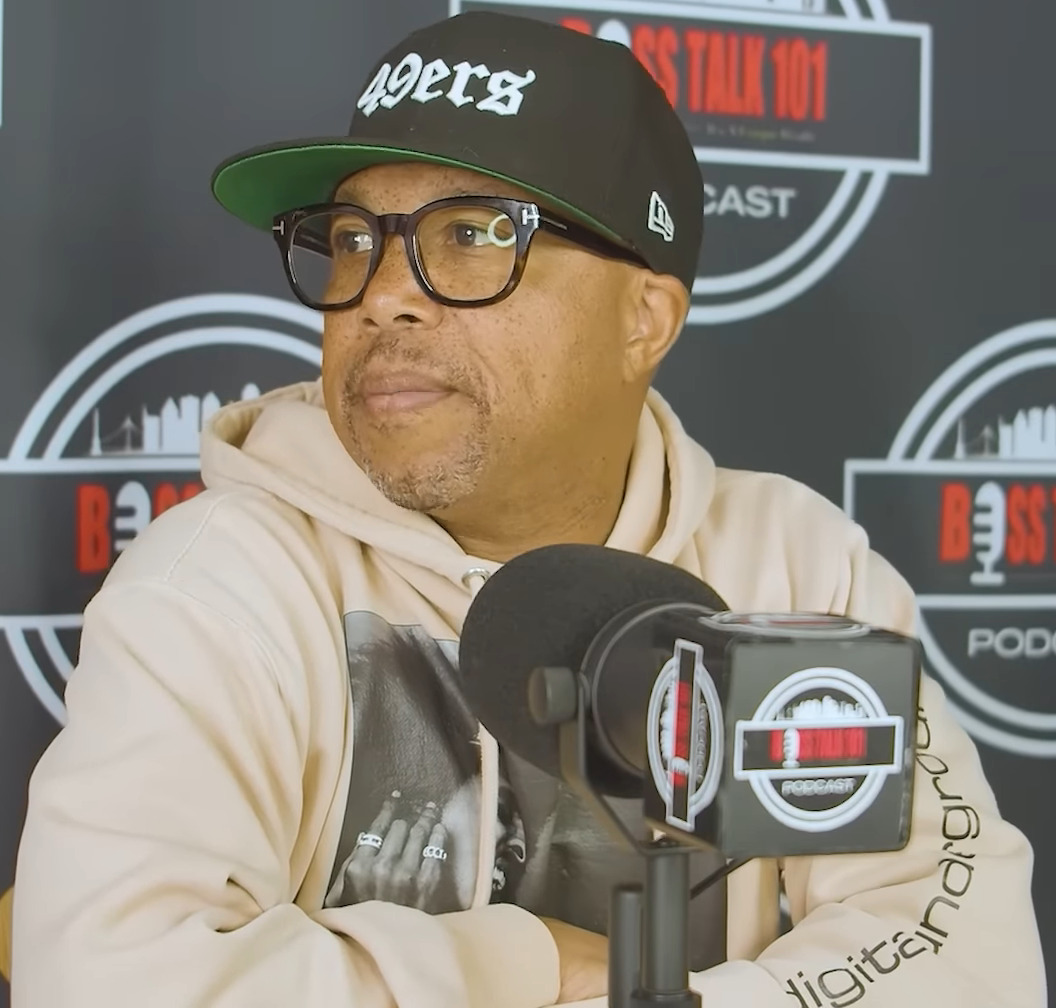
- Money-B in 2025

Background information
- Born: Ronald Brooks; September 22, 1969 (age 56); Philadelphia, Pennsylvania, U.S.
- Origin: Oakland, California, U.S.
- Genres: Hip hop
- Years active: 1989–present
- Member of: Digital Underground

Ronald Brooks, better known by his stage name Money-B, is an American rapper, best known for being a member of the funk and rap group Digital Underground. He is a member of Raw Fusion with DJ Fuze whom they had two albums, Live From the Styleetron and Hoochified Funk. He was featured on 2pac's 1993 single "I Get Around".

He had a solo album named Talkin' Dirty which features Digital Underground, released in 1999. He contributed to the script and acted as himself for the Digital Underground portion of the 2017 Tupac Shakur biopic All Eyez on Me.

His memoir, A D.U. Party Don't Stop: The Money B Story, is scheduled for release on October 13, 2026.

== Discography ==
Solo albums

- Talkin' Dirty (1999)
- Mandatory (Volume 1) (2007)
- 4 Tha Funk Of It (2009)
- The Tonite Show With Money B (with DJ.Fresh) (2009)

With Digital Underground

- Sex Packets (1990)
- This Is an EP Release (1991)
- Sons of the P (1991)
- The Body-Hat Syndrome (1993)
- Future Rhythm (1996)
- Who Got the Gravy? (1998)

With Raw Fusion

- Live From The Styleetron (1991)
- Hoochiefied Funk (1994)

Guest appearances

- "Call It What You Want" (by Above The Law feat. 2Pac & Money-B) (1992)
- "I Get Around" (by 2pac feat. Digital Underground) (1993)
