= Doowutchyalike =

Single by Digital Underground

from the album Sex Packets
- B-side: "Hip Hop Doll"
- Released: 1989
- Genre: Hip-hop; funk
- Length: 8:54
- Label: TNT; Tommy Boy
- Songwriter: Gregory Jacobs
- Producer: Shock G

Digital Underground singles chronology
"Underwater Rimes" (1988)	"Doowutchyalike" (1989)	"The Humpty Dance" (1990)

Music video
- "Doowutchyalike" on YouTube

"Doowutchyalike" is a song performed by American hip-hop collective Digital Underground, written and produced by its frontman Shock G. It was released in 1989 through TNT/Tommy Boy Records as the lead single from the group's debut studio album Sex Packets.

In the United States, the song peaked at number 29 on the Hot R&B/Hip-Hop Songs, number 19 on the Hot Rap Songs and number 20 on the Dance Singles Sales charts. In the United Kingdom, it reached number 79 on the UK singles chart, number 27 on the Official Hip Hop and R&B Singles Chart and number 19 on the Official Independent Singles Chart. It also made it to number 139 in Australia.

The song can be heard in Gina Prince-Bythewood's 2000 romantic sports drama film Love & Basketball.

== Track listing ==
12" TB 932 1989
No.	Title	Writer(s)	Length
1.	"Doowutchyalike" (Playhowyalike Mix)	Gregory Jacobs
2.	"Hip Hop Doll" (Vocal Mix)	Jacobs; Ken Waters
3.	"Doowutchyalike" (Instrumental Mix)	Jacobs
4.	"Doowutchyalike" (Radio Mix)	Jacobs
5.	"Hip Hop Doll" (Instrumental Mix)	Jacobs; Waters
6.	"Doowutchyalike" (Underground Like-Appella Mix)	Jacobs

12" TB 955 1990
No.	Title	Writer(s)	Length
1.	"Doowutchyalike" (The "Just Throw A Break-Beat Up Under There" Remix)	Jacobs
2.	"Doowutchyalike" (Playhowyalike Mix)	Jacobs
3.	"Packet Man" (45 King Extended Mix)	Jacobs; George Clinton; William Collins; Glenn Goins
4.	"Packet Man" (LP Version)	Jacobs; Clinton; Collins; Goins
5.	"Packet Man" (Instrumental)	Jacobs; Clinton; Collins; Goins

== Charts ==
Chart (1989)	Peak position
UK Singles (Official Charts)	79
US Hot R&B/Hip-Hop Songs (Billboard)	82

Chart (1990)	Peak position
Australia (ARIA Charts)	139
US Hot R&B/Hip-Hop Songs (Billboard)	29
US Hot Rap Songs (Billboard)	19
US Dance Singles Sales (Billboard)	20

Chart (2001)	Peak position
UK Hip Hop/R&B (Official Charts)	27
UK Indie (Official Charts)	19
