= Sex Packets =

Studio album by Digital Underground
- Released: March 20, 1990
- Recorded: 1989
- Genre: Hip-hop
- Length: 65:26 (CD); 81:14 (Cassette)
- Labels: Tommy Boy; Warner Bros.
- Producer: Digital Underground

Digital Underground chronology
Sex Packets (1990)	This Is an EP Release (1991)

Singles from Sex Packets
- 1. "Doowutchyalike" Released: October 18, 1989; 2. "The Humpty Dance" Released: January 20, 1990

Sex Packets is the debut studio album by American hip-hop group Digital Underground, released on March 20, 1990.

== Album background ==
The album is a concept album about "G.S.R.A." (Genetic Suppression Relief Antidotes), a pharmaceutical substance that is produced in the form of a large glowing pill about the size of a quarter, which comes in a condom-sized package and is allegedly developed by the government to provide its intended users such as astronauts with a satisfying sexual experience in situations where the normal attainment of such experiences would be counter-productive to the mission at hand.

== Release and reception ==
Professional ratings
Review scores
Source	Rating
AllMusic	5/5 stars
The Encyclopedia of Popular Music	4/5 stars
Entertainment Weekly	C+
Orlando Sentinel	4/5 stars
RapReviews	8/10
The Rolling Stone Album Guide	4/5 stars
Spin Alternative Record Guide	8/10
The Village Voice	B

The album was released in the spring of 1990 following the success of its two lead-off singles: "Doowutchyalike", a moderate club hit, followed by "The Humpty Dance", which reached No. 11 on the pop chart, No. 7 on the R&B chart, and No. 1 on the Billboard Rap Singles chart. Sex Packets was released to positive reviews and eventually achieved platinum sales. Newsday noted that "as the romantic—and in the end, middlebrow—self-consciousness of the artist seeps into hip-hop, Digital Underground turns it on its head, shuffling the goofy indistinguishably with the avant-garde." The Source praised the album's experimental fusion of musical styles, with Digital Underground incorporating jazz piano and funk elements into their hip-hop production. The reviewer highlighted tracks like "Doowhutchyalike" as a "unique whimsical party jam" and noted how "The Humpty Dance" gained widespread appeal among dance floor audiences. The review also commended the group's production approach of combining live drums and turntables. The album was re-issued on February 8, 2005, by Rhino Entertainment.

== Legacy ==
In 1998, the album was selected as one of The Source's "100 Best Rap Albums". It is included in the book 1001 Albums You Must Hear Before You Die. The album is broken down track by track by Digital Underground in Brian Coleman's book Check the Technique. In 2022, Rolling Stone placed it at number 114 on their list of the "200 Greatest Hip-Hop Albums of All Time".

== Track listing ==
=== CD ===
No.	Title	Length
1.	"The Humpty Dance"	6:30
2.	"The Way We Swing"	6:48
3.	"Rhymin' on the Funk"	6:16
4.	"The New Jazz (One)"	0:37
5.	"Underwater Rimes (Remix)"	4:23
6.	"Gutfest '89 (Edit)"	5:50
7.	"The Danger Zone"	5:31
8.	"Freaks of the Industry"	5:38
9.	"Doowutchyalike"	8:51
10.	"Packet Prelude"	0:57
11.	"Sex Packets"	7:21
12.	"Street Scene"	0:33
13.	"Packet Man"	4:41
14.	"Packet Reprise"	1:23

=== LP ===
Side A
No.	Title	Length
1.	"The Humpty Dance"	6:00
2.	"The Way We Swing"	6:48
3.	"Packet Prelude"	0:57
4.	"Sex Packets"	7:21
5.	"Street Scene"	0:33
6.	"Packet Man"	4:41

Side B
No.	Title	Length
1.	"Freaks of the Industry"	5:38
2.	"Underwater Rimes (Remix)"	4:23
3.	"The New Jazz (One)"	0:37
4.	"Rhymin' on the Funk"	6:16
5.	"The Danger Zone"	5:31
6.	"Packet Reprise"	1:30
7.	"Doowutchyalike (Edit)"	4:12

=== Cassette ===
The cassette version of the album has 3 extra tracks, plus an extended version of "Gutfest '89"

Side 1 (Safe Side)
No.	Title	Details	Length
1.	"The Humpty Dance"		6:30
2.	"The Way We Swing"		6:48
3.	"Hip Hop Doll"	Cassette-only track	5:30
4.	"Underwater Rimes (Remix)"		4:23
5.	"Rhymin' on the Funk"		6:16
6.	"The New Jazz (One)"		0:37
7.	"The Danger Zone"		5:31
8.	"Doowutchyalike"		8:51

Side 2 (Sex Side)
No.	Title	Details	Length
9.	"Freaks of the Industry"		5:38
10.	"Gutfest '89 (Full)"	Cassette-only version	8:17
11.	"Sound of the Underground"	Cassette-only track	5:06
12.	"A Tribute to the Early Days"	Cassette-only track	3:06
13.	"Packet Prelude"		0:57
14.	"Sex Packets"		7:21
15.	"Street Scene"		0:33
16.	"Packet Man"		4:41
17.	"Packet Reprise"		1:30

== Charts ==
=== Weekly charts ===
Chart (1990-1991)	Peak position
Australian Albums (ARIA)	153
UK Albums (Official Charts)	59
US Billboard 200	24
US Top R&B/Hip-Hop Albums (Billboard)	8

=== Year-end charts ===
Chart (1990)	Position
US Billboard 200	57
US Top R&B/Hip-Hop Albums (Billboard)	26

== Certifications ==
Region	Certification	Certified units/sales
United States (RIAA)	Platinum	1,000,000^{^}
^{^} Shipments figures based on certification alone.
