= The Humpty Dance =

1990 single by Digital Underground

Single by Digital Underground

from the album Sex Packets
- Released: January 20, 1990
- Recorded: 1989
- Studio: Starlight Sound (Richmond, California)
- Genre: Golden age hip-hop; new jack swing; funk
- Length: 6:30 (original version); 4:42 (radio edit)
- Label: Tommy Boy
- Songwriters: Shock G; George Clinton
- Producer: Shock G

Digital Underground singles chronology
"Doowutchyalike" (1989)	"The Humpty Dance" (1990)	"Same Song" (1991)

"The Humpty Dance" is a song by the American hip-hop group Digital Underground from their debut album, Sex Packets (1990). Released as the second single from the album in January 1990, it reached No. 11 on the pop chart, No. 7 on the R&B chart, and No. 1 on the Billboard Rap Singles chart. The song is sung by Shock G's alter ego, "Humpty Hump", marking the character's second musical appearance; the first was Digital Underground's "Doowutchyalike," a pre-album video-single released in the spring of 1989. The song has been sampled by many different artists and producers.

In 2008, "The Humpty Dance" was ranked No. 30 on VH1's 100 Greatest Songs of Hip Hop and No. 65 on VH1's 100 Greatest Songs of the '90s in 2007. The song was included in the musical reference book 1001 Songs You Must Hear Before You Die. At the 1990 MTV Video Music Awards, it received a nomination for Best Rap Video but lost to "U Can't Touch This" by MC Hammer. Canadian television channel MuchMoreMusic's series Back In... rated the song's video as one of the worst of 1990.

In 2021, the song was ranked number 241 on Rolling Stone's list of the 500 Greatest Songs of All Time.

== Composition ==
Of the five raw elements that make up the "Humpty Dance" drum track, one is a sample from "Sing a Simple Song" by Sly and the Family Stone, in the form of a one-measure-long drum loop. Digital Underground incorporated the Family Stone drum loop with four other raw elements; a deep tonal kick drum that alternated between two bass notes, a handclap snare (also a sample, taken from "Theme From the Black Hole" by the band Parliament), drum-machine hi-hats running continuously throughout which were programmed to 8th-notes, and a guitar hit happening once every bar, all assembled into the now-familiar pattern that forms the Humpty Dance drum track. The vocal sample that happens in the song's chorus sections is from Parliament's "Let's Play House" from their 1980 album, Trombipulation.

== Subject matter ==
"The Humpty Dance" is a tribute to Humpty's sexual prowess despite his ridiculous appearance. Humpty introduces the appearance theme with the opening line, "I'm about to ruin the image and the style that you're used to," a protest against the uniformity among successful rappers of the time.

In the final verse, Humpty describes the Humpty Dance itself as a loose, easy dance, "like MC Hammer on crack ... Anyone can play this game." The contrast is with the precision dancing in MC Hammer's videos. The song ends with an invitation for people of all races to join in the dance.

== Humpty Hump ==
"The Humpty Dance" is Shock G's second song to feature his alter-ego "Humpty Hump," who debuted on "Doowutchyalike" which was Digital Underground's first video release in 1989. The character, which sports a buffoon persona, colorful clothes, and Groucho glasses, is sung by Shock G. A fictional biography was constructed for Humpty, the story being that Edward Ellington Humphrey III, former lead singer of "Smooth Eddie and the Humpers," had become a rapper after burning his nose in a kitchen accident with a deep-fryer. Because of the "accident", the character is seen wearing a large nose disguise.

== In popular culture ==
A brief section of the song was performed by Justin Timberlake and Jimmy Fallon on Late Night with Jimmy Fallon in September 2010.

=== Sampling "The Humpty Dance" ===
"The Humpty Dance" is one of the most sampled songs recorded by a hip hop/rap artist. Digital Underground humorously devoted the song "The Humpty Dance Awards" from their album The Body-Hat Syndrome to the many recording artists who sampled the track. Since then, dozens more artists have sampled the Humpty Dance song, from Ice Cube to Public Enemy.

- "A Crazy Break" – WC & the Maad Circle (full drum loop)
- "Ain't That a Bitch" – Kam (full drum loop)
- "Assata's Song (Remix)" – Paris (full drum loop on bridge)
- "Attention: The Shawanda Story" – Lo-Key? (full drum loop)
- "Back to the Underground" – WC & the Maad Circle (vocal, snare & kicks used in drum track)
- "Behind Closed Doors" – WC & the Maad Circle (raw instrumental used as their drum track)
- "Blow Your Mind" – Redman (drum loop)
- "Boom! Shake the Room" – Will Smith (drum track looped underneath as kick drum support)
- "Buck tha Devil – Da Lench Mob (full drum loop)
- "Bumbell" – Yukmouth feat. Tech N9ne (bassline)
- "Can't Truss It" – Public Enemy (full drum loop)
- "Cherish the Day" (Best of Sade version) – Sade (raw instrumental used as drum track in last 30 secs of song)
- "Christmas Spliff" – Luke (full drum loop)
- "City to City" – Straw tha Vegas Don feat. Shock G (raw instrumental scratched in first verse)
- "Cotex" – BWP (full drum loop; looped in reverse)
- "Curse" – Recoil
- "D.O.G. Me Out" – Guy (piece of loop, muted, as kick drum support)
- "Dirty Water" – Made in London (full drum loop)
- "DJVD" – Nitzer Ebb (bassline)
- "Don't Be Afraid (Jazz You Up Version)" – Aaron Hall (full drum loop)
- "Dr. Trevis (Signs Off)" – Redman (bit of drum loop underneath)
- "Drive-By (Rollin' Slow)" – Boss (full drum loop)
- "Flip Squad's in da House" – Big Kap, Flip Squad, Funkmaster Flex (full drum loop & bassline)
- "Funk Mobb Niggaz" – Little Bruce (full drum loop)
- "Get a Little Freaky with Me" – Aaron Hall (full drum loop)
- "Here We Go Again" – Portrait (raw instrumental as their drum track)
- "His Story" – TLC (full drum loop)
- "Hold Onto My Bumper" – Dice (full drum loop)
- "Holiday Madness" – Kam (full drum loop)
- "How I'm Comin'" – LL Cool (full drum loop)
- "How Ya Gonna Reason With a Psycho" – Insane Poetry (full drum loop)
- "I Made Love (4 Da Very First Time)" – Little Shawn (drum track doubled up)
- "If U Can't Dance" – Spice Girls (drum loop & bassline)
- "I'm Outstanding" – Shaquille O'Neal (drum track looped underneath as support)
- "Imma Gitz Mine" – Erick Sermon (chopped & muted drum bit underneath; kick drum support)
- "Is It Good to You" – Heavy-D & the Boys (full drum loop)
- "Jackin' For Beats" – Ice Cube (raw instrumental)
- "Live and Learn" – Joe Public (full drum loop)
- "Lost in the Storm" – Chubb Rock (raw instrumental used as their drum track)
- "Love Don't Make Sense" – Alexander O'Neal (full drum loop)
- "Love Sick" – Gang Starr (vocal sample scratched in choruses)
- "Mama Said Knock You Out" – LL Cool J (full drum loop)
- "Night of a Thousand Furry Toys" – Richard Wright (full drum loop)
- "Not Your Money" – Oaktown's 357 (full drum loop)
- "Nothin'" – Gold Money (full drum loop)
- "PlayGround" – ABC (full loop, muted, used for kick drum support)
- "Public Service Announcement" – Jay-Z (lyrics & rhyme cadence interpolation)
- "Really Doe" – Ice Cube (bit of drum track underneath)
- "SMPTE" – The Boys (full drum loop)
- "Stop What Ya Doin'" – Apathy (one full bar length vocal & music sample)
- "Teddy's Jam 2" – Guy (full loop)
- "The Break Up" – WC & the Maad Circle (full drum loop)
- "The Humpty Dance Awards" – Digital Underground (full drum loop & bassline)
- "The Money is Made" – Detroit's Most Wanted (full drum loop)
- "Time 4 Sum Aksion" – Redman (drum track chopped underneath; kick drum support)
- "Two 4 the Time" – Nubian Crackers (raw instrumental as their drum track)
- "Walk Thru Hell" – K-Stone (raw full instrumental)
- "What About Your Friends" – TLC (drum track looped underneath for support)
- "Who's the Mack?" – Ice Cube (vocal sample)
- "Witchhunt" – Godflesh (drum loop & bassline)
- "You Gotta Believe" – Marky Mark & the Funky Bunch (full drum loop)
- "Young N*ggaz" – 2Pac (drum track underneath)

Printed References:

Posted References:

Audio References:

== Charts ==
=== Weekly charts ===
Chart (1990)	Position
US Billboard Hot 100	11
US Rap Chart (Billboard)	1
US Cash Box Top 100	13

=== Year-end charts ===
Chart (1990)	Position
US Billboard Hot 100	62

== Certifications ==
Region	Certification	Certified units/sales
United States (RIAA)	Platinum	1,000,000^{^}
^{^} Shipments figures based on certification alone.
