= Digital Underground =

American alternative hip hop band

- Digital Underground in 1992

Background information
- Origin: Oakland, California, U.S.
- Genres: Alternative hip-hop; funk
- Years active: 1987–present
- Labels: TNT; Tommy Boy; Warner Bros.; Critique/Radikal; Interscope; Universal
- Members: Money-B; Young Hump
- Past members: Shock G; Kenny K; Chopmaster J; Pee-Wee; Bigg Money Odis; DJ Fuze; Saafir; J-Beats; Cleetis Mack; 2Pac; Young Mass; Esinchill; Element

Digital Underground is an American alternative hip-hop group from Oakland, California. The group was formed in 1987 by Digital Underground's leader and mainstay Gregory "Shock G" Jacobs, alongside Tampa hip-hop radio deejay Kenneth "Kenny-K" Waters and Jimi "Chopmaster J" Dright of Berkeley, California.

Heavily influenced by the various funk bands of the 1970s, Digital Underground sampled such music frequently. As "Rackadelic", Jacobs designed album covers and cartoon-laced liner notes, in homage to Parliament-Funkadelic album designs. Digital Underground is also notable for launching the career of member Tupac Shakur, as well as spinning off side projects and solo acts including Raw Fusion, Saafir, Gold Money (Pee-Wee & Bigg Money Odis) and singer Mystic.

Following the release of their "Doowutchyalike" single and video in the summer of 1989, the band gained popularity with their song "The Humpty Dance" in 1990. Digital Underground toured nearly every year until 2008; this consisted of live shows in Europe, Japan, Canada, Australia, and the United States. While the group's origins lay mostly in Oakland and Berkeley, California, various characters and voices from around the US and UK appeared on the band's albums. Shock G and Money-B were the only individuals to appear on every album. Other recurring key contributors were David "DJ Fuze" Elliot, and deejay/producer Jeremy "J-Beats" Jackson, who both assisted Jacobs in developing the sound.

Shock G died in 2021, but Digital Underground continues to tour. Saafir died in 2024, and Cleetis Mack died in 2026.

In 2025, Jeff Mezydlo of Yardbarker included the band in his list of "20 underrated bands from the 1990s who are worth rediscovering".

== History ==
=== Formation ===
Jacobs spent most of his youth in Tampa, Florida and New York City. Founded in 1987, the group's image was originally more militant, and was intended to be a tribute to social activists The Black Panthers. However, when groups like N.W.A and Public Enemy rose to prominence, Jacobs chose to take the image in a more whimsical and upbeat direction.

=== Sex Packets ===
Sex Packets, the group's debut album, was released in early 1990 following the success of their two previous singles, which were included on the album. "Doowutchyalike", a moderate club hit, debuted the previous year, followed in January by the more successful song "The Humpty Dance", a humorous dance number that reached No. 11 on the Billboard Hot 100, No. 7 on the R&B chart, and No. 1 on the Billboard Rap Singles chart. It was rapped by Shock G's alter ego Humpty Hump, and featured a drum track with over 50 confirmed usages in other songs. Sex Packets features P-Funk samples, jazz-influenced interludes, and a combination of samples and live instrumentation, earning it positive reviews and platinum sales.

=== This Is an EP Release ===
This Is an EP Release is the RIAA Gold certified second Digital Underground release, from which two songs, "Tie the Knot" and "Same Song" were featured in the film Nothing But Trouble starring Dan Aykroyd, Chevy Chase, Demi Moore, and John Candy. "Tie The Knot", features jazzy piano tracks and a comedic interpretation of "Bridal Chorus". "Same Song" has an organ solo and improvised organ bits throughout the song, making it one of hip-hop's first singles to successfully integrate live instrumentation with music samples. Tupac Shakur made his debut on the latter song and portrayed an African king in the video. Tupac also can be heard joking around on the remixed version of "The Way We Swing" as a background vocalist, adding humorous ad-libs between the verses. Tupac first began to appear on stage with the group as one of its dancers and "hype men".

=== Sons of the P ===
The group's second full album featured two singles, "No Nose Job" and "Kiss You Back", the latter of which featured multi-layered choruses and background vocals sung by Boni Boyer, who briefly worked with Digital Underground shortly after her stint with Prince's Sign of the Times/Love Sexy band. Despite the fact that a choir of singers were portrayed in the video, the actual studio singing was exclusively Boni on all tracks, excluding the male voices. It has been mistakenly reported that "Kiss You Back" was co-written and co-performed by George Clinton, but his name appears in the writers credit due to a sample of "(Not Just) Knee Deep" by Funkadelic being used. He did, however, actively participate in the writing and recording of the title track "Sons of the P", which he also contributed vocals to, and which marked one of the earliest studio guest appearances by Clinton on a Hip Hop release, which is preceded only by Kurtis Blow's "Magilla Gorilla" released in 1986. Both the album and the "Kiss You Back" single were each certified Gold by the RIAA.

The group surprised the audience at a 1991 episode of Showtime at the Apollo, pretending to be a group called "the Unknown Rappers" from Beaumont, Texas. The trio wore paper bags over their heads and began a rap, which led to boos, before revealing who they truly were, and began their hit "Kiss You Back".

=== The Body-Hat Syndrome ===
With the leading single "The Return of the Crazy One", and its accompanying X-rated video, which was reworked for public consumption, gaining positive feedback, the rest of The Body-Hat Syndrome unfurled to less than outstanding crossover commercial acclaim. The album's second single, an anti-racism cultural awareness politico called "Wussup Wit the Luv", featured a solo from Funkadelic guitarist Michael Hampton, as well as a verse and video appearance from Tupac Shakur. This would be the last time Tupac appeared on any Digital Underground release, while lead rappers Saafir and Clee were added to the band's lineup. This album also features "The Humpty Dance Awards", the group's humorous shout-out to the artists who sampled the Humpty Dance prior to 1993.

=== Future Rhythm ===
Future Rhythm, the group's fourth full album, would be their first independent release, including two songs that were featured in the Wayans brothers' film Don't Be a Menace to South Central While Drinking Your Juice in the Hood: "Food Fight", featuring Del tha Funkee Homosapien, and "We Got More" with Luniz. The album also contains an early performance from rapper Sly Boogy, while he was still a member of the Black Spooks, who appeared on the song "Fool Get a Clue".

=== Who Got the Gravy? ===
In 1998, eight years after the group's first album, Digital Underground released Who Got the Gravy?, which reached No. 91 on the Top 200 R&B/Hip-Hop Albums chart. The album intentionally featured several East Coast rappers at a time when the East vs. West rivalry was active, in an attempt to downplay and ridicule it. The guests included New York City natives Big Pun, Biz Markie and KRS-One.

=== ..Cuz A D.U. Party Don't Stop! ===
Digital Underground's final studio album, ..Cuz a D.U. Party Don't Stop!, was released on May 20, 2008, although a substantial portion of it was recorded at a live show from 2005. Shortly before its release, the group took an indefinite hiatus. Money-B has stated that Shock G expressed interest in writing a book and exploring music unfit for the Digital Underground name.

On May 18, 2010, The Greenlight EP was released, which features some previously unreleased Digital Underground tracks.

== Discography ==
=== Albums ===
- Sex Packets (1990) US No. 24, R&B No. 8; UK No. 59
- Sons of the P (1991) US No. 44, R&B No. 23
- The Body-Hat Syndrome (1993) US No. 79, R&B No. 16
- Future Rhythm (1996) US No. 113, R&B No. 26
- Who Got the Gravy? (1998) R&B No. 91
- ..Cuz a D.U. Party Don't Stop! (2008)

=== EPs ===
- This Is an EP Release a.k.a. Same Song (1991) US No. 29, R&B No. 7, UK No. 52
- The Greenlight EP (2010)

=== Soundtracks ===
- Nothing But Trouble (1991)
- Don't Be a Menace to South Central While Drinking Your Juice in the Hood (1996)
- Tupac: Resurrection (2003)

=== Compilations ===
- Yo! Rap Hits (1991)
- Oakland Soul: The Bay Area Soundtrack (1997)
- The Lost Files (1999)
- No Nose Job: The Legend of Digital Underground (2001)
- Outrageous Rap (2002)
- Playwutchyalike: The Best of Digital Underground (2003)
- Rhino Hi-Five: Digital Underground (2005)
- Songs You Know: Ol' Skool Hip Hop (2007)
- Westside Bugg Presents... The Best of the West (2008)

=== Singles ===
Year	Single	Peak position								Album
Year	Single	US	US R&B	US Dance	US Radio	AUS	NZ	NL	UK	Album
1988	"Underwater Rimes"	—	—	—	—	—	—	—	—	Sex Packets
1989	"Doowutchyalike"	—	—	—	—	—	—	—	79	Sex Packets
1990	"The Humpty Dance"	11	7	20	—	—	—	—	80	Sex Packets
1990	"Doowutchyalike (Remix) / Packet Man"	—	29	—	—	139	—	—	—	Sex Packets
1990	"Packet Man (The C.J. Mackintosh Remixes)" (Europe only)	—	—	—	—	—	—	—	—	Sex Packets
1990	"Freaks of the Industry" (US promo only)	—	—	—	—	—	—	—	—	Sex Packets
1991	"Same Song"	—	—	15	61	—	—	—	52	This Is An E.P. Release
1991	"Nuttin' Nis Funky" (US only)	—	—	—	—	—	—	—	—	This Is An E.P. Release
1991	"Kiss You Back"	40	13	—	50	97	31	—	—	Sons Of The P
1992	"No Nose Job"	—	28	—	—	—	—	42	—	Sons Of The P
1993	"The Return of the Crazy One"	—	77	—	—	—	—	—	—	The "Body-Hat" Syndrome
1994	"Wussup Wit The Luv"	—	99	—	—	—	—	—	—	The "Body-Hat" Syndrome
1996	"Oregano Flow"	—	75	—	—	—	—	—	—	Future Rhythm
1996	"Walk Real Kool" (US only)	—	95	—	—	—	—	—	—	Future Rhythm
1998	"Wind Me Up" (US promo only)	—	—	—	—	—	—	—	—	Who Got The Gravy
1998	"The Mission" (US promo only)	—	—	—	—	—	—	—	—	Who Got The Gravy
"—" denotes releases that did not chart or were not released.

=== Videos ===
- "Doowutchyalike" (1989)
- "The Humpty Dance" (1990)
- "Doowutchyalike" (video remix) (1990)
- "Same Song" (1991)
- "Kiss You Back" (1991)
- "No Nose Job" (1992)
- "Return of the Crazy One" (1993)
- "Wassup Wit the Luv" (1994)
- "Oregano Flow" (1996)
- "Walk Real Kool" (1996)
- "Wind Me Up" (1998)

=== DVDs ===
- Tupac Shakur: Thug Angel: The Life of an Outlaw (2000)
- Tupac: Resurrection (2003)
- Digital Underground: Raw and Uncut (2004)
- One Nation Under a Groove (2005)
