= Greatest Hits (Tupac Shakur album) =

Greatest hits album by 2Pac
- Released: November 24, 1998
- Genres: Hip-hop; R&B
- Length: 114:43
- Labels: Amaru; Death Row; Interscope; Jive
- Producers: Dr. Dre; Tony Pizarro; Big D the Impossible; DJ Quik; Dat Nigga Daz; DJ Daryl; Nate Dogg; Warren G; Easy Mo Bee; Johnny "J"; QDIII; Live Squad; Reggie Moore; Raw Fusion; Shock G; Soulshock & Karlin; 2Pac

2Pac chronology
R U Still Down? (Remember Me) (1997)	Greatest Hits (1998)	Still I Rise (1999)

Singles from Greatest Hits
- 1. "Changes" Released: October 13, 1998; 2. "Unconditional Love" Released: January 26, 1999

Greatest Hits is a posthumous double-disc greatest hits album by American rapper 2Pac, released by Amaru Entertainment, Death Row Records, Interscope Records, and Jive Records on November 24, 1998.

The album's non-chronological sequence focuses on the highlights of 2Pac's career. Twenty-one of his tracks are accompanied by four previously unreleased songs: "God Bless the Dead", "Unconditional Love", "Troublesome '96", and "Changes". Some tracks have alternate mixes, while the original mix of "California Love" makes its first proper album appearance after initially only being available as a single.

"Changes" earned 2Pac the first and only posthumous Grammy Award nomination for Best Rap Solo Performance. This is one of two 2Pac releases—and one of only nine hip-hop albums—to have been certified Diamond in the United States.

== Commercial performance ==
Greatest Hits debuted at number five on the US Billboard 200 chart, selling 268,000 copies in its first week. In January 1999, the album reached its peak at number three on the chart. It has spent 433 weeks on the Billboard 200. On October 16, 2000, it was certified 9× platinum. Nearly 11 years later, in June 2011, it was certified by the RIAA for shipments of over 10 million, the late rapper's first RIAA Diamond award. With 5.33 million units sold which is 10.66 million in RIAA sales, it remains the best-selling rap greatest hits compilation of all time and the twentieth best-selling rap album since Nielsen Soundscan began tracking record sales in 1991.

Tupac Shakur's virtual appearance at the annual Coachella Festival on April 15, 2012, spurred a re-entry for the album on the Billboard 200 chart; it jumped in at No. 129 with 4,000 copies sold according to Nielsen SoundScan (a gain of 571% over the previous week).

The album was certified Platinum by the BPI on 16 August 2002, making it 2Pac's highest selling album in the UK.

Professional ratings
Review scores
Source	Rating
AllMusic	4.5/5 stars
Christgau's Consumer Guide	(1-star Honorable Mention)
Entertainment Weekly	A−
Los Angeles Times	4/4 stars
Rolling Stone Album Guide	5/5 stars

== Track listing ==
Disc 1
No.	Title	From	Length
1.	"Keep Ya Head Up" (features uncredited vocals by Dave Hollister)	Strictly 4 My N.I.G.G.A.Z... (1993)	4:22
2.	"2 of Amerikaz Most Wanted" (featuring Snoop Doggy Dogg)	All Eyez on Me (1996)	4:07
3.	"Temptations"	Me Against the World (1995)	5:00
4.	"God Bless the Dead" (features uncredited vocals by Stretch)	Previously unreleased	4:22
5.	"Hail Mary" (features uncredited vocals by Outlawz and Prince Ital Joe)	The Don Killuminati: The 7 Day Theory (1996)	5:12
6.	"Me Against the World" (featuring Dramacydal)	Me Against the World (1995)	4:39
7.	"How Do U Want It" (featuring K-Ci & JoJo) (some lyrics are censored from the original album version)	All Eyez on Me (1996)	4:48
8.	"So Many Tears"	Me Against the World (1995)	3:58
9.	"Unconditional Love" (features uncredited vocals by Nanci Fletcher)	Previously unreleased	3:59
10.	"Trapped" (some lyrics are censored from the original album version)	2Pacalypse Now (1991)	4:44
11.	"Life Goes On"	All Eyez on Me (1996)	5:01
12.	"Hit 'Em Up" (featuring Hussein Fatal, Yaki Kadafi & E.D.I. Mean of Outlawz)	How Do U Want It CD Single (1996)	5:12
Total length:			55:24

Disc 2
No.	Title	From	Length
1.	"Troublesome '96"	Previously unreleased	4:36
2.	"Brenda's Got a Baby"	2Pacalypse Now (1991)	3:53
3.	"I Ain't Mad at Cha" (featuring Danny Boy)	All Eyez on Me (1996)	4:53
4.	"I Get Around" (with Digital Underground)	Strictly 4 My N.I.G.G.A.Z... (1993)	4:19
5.	"Changes" (features uncredited vocals by Talent)	Previously unreleased	4:29
6.	"California Love" (featuring Dr. Dre and Roger Troutman)	"California Love" (Long Radio Edit) from "How Do U Want It" single (1996)	4:45
7.	"Picture Me Rollin'" (featuring Danny Boy, CPO, Syke)	All Eyez on Me (1996)	5:14
8.	"How Long Will They Mourn Me?" (featuring Nate Dogg and uncredited vocals by Thug Life)	Thug Life, Volume I (1994)	3:52
9.	"Toss It Up" (A new mix with some altered lyrics featuring uncredited vocals by K-Ci & JoJo, Danny Boy, Aaron Hall)	The Don Killuminati: The 7 Day Theory (1996)	4:42
10.	"Dear Mama"	Me Against the World (1995)	4:40
11.	"All About U" (featuring Nate Dogg, Top Dogg, Dru Down and uncredited vocals by Hussein Fatal and Yaki Kadafi)	Non-album remix of "All Bout U", made for Greatest Hits (Snoop Dogg is replaced by Top Dogg)	4:36
12.	"To Live & Die in L.A." (featuring Val Young)	The Don Killuminati: The 7 Day Theory (1996)	4:32
13.	"Heartz of Men"	All Eyez on Me (1996)	4:43
Total length:			59:14

== Charts ==
=== Weekly charts ===
Weekly chart performance for Greatest Hits
Chart (1998–1999)	Peak position
Australian Albums (ARIA)	11
Austrian Albums (Ö3 Austria)	15
Belgian Albums (Ultratop Flanders)	3
Belgian Albums (Ultratop Wallonia)	30
Canada Top Albums/CDs (RPM)	18
Dutch Albums (Album Top 100)	1
European Albums (Music & Media)	16
Finnish Albums (Suomen virallinen lista)	10
German Albums (Offizielle Top 100)	9
Irish Albums (IRMA)	10
New Zealand Albums (RMNZ)	19
Norwegian Albums (VG-lista)	10
Scottish Albums (Official Charts)	40
Swedish Albums (Sverigetopplistan)	40
Swiss Albums (Schweizer Hitparade)	13
UK Albums (Official Charts)	17
UK Independent Albums (Official Charts)	3
UK R&B Albums (Official Charts)	2
US Billboard 200	3
US Top R&B/Hip-Hop Albums (Billboard)	1

Chart (2000)	Peak position
UK Albums (Official Charts Company)	96

Chart (2001)	Peak position
Ireland (IRMA)	59
UK Albums (Official Charts Company)	25

Chart (2002)	Peak position
Belgium (Ultratop 50 Wallonia)	30

Chart (2015)	Peak position
US Billboard 200	78
UK Albums (Official Charts Company)	74

Chart (2017)	Peak position
US Billboard Catalog Albums	2
US Billboard Digital Albums	23

Chart (2020–2022)	Peak position
Canadian Albums (Billboard)	36

Chart (2025)	Peak position
Greek Albums (IFPI)	18

=== Year-end charts ===
Year-end chart performance for Greatest Hits
Chart (1999)	Position
Australian Albums (ARIA)	72
Belgian Albums (Ultratop Flanders)	26
Dutch Albums (Album Top 100)	26
German Albums (Offizielle Top 100)	41
UK Albums (OCC)	79
US Billboard 200	16
US Top R&B/Hip-Hop Albums (Billboard)	8

Chart (2001)	Position
Canadian R&B Albums (Nielsen SoundScan)	124
UK Albums (OCC)	184

Chart (2002)	Position
Canadian R&B Albums (Nielsen SoundScan)	137
Canadian Rap Albums (Nielsen SoundScan)	69

Chart (2015)	Position
US Billboard 200	148

Chart (2016)	Position
US Billboard 200	121

Chart (2017)	Position
US Billboard 200	78
US Top R&B/Hip-Hop Albums (Billboard)	45

Chart (2018)	Position
US Billboard 200	168
US Top R&B/Hip-Hop Albums (Billboard)	93

Chart (2019)	Position
US Billboard 200	89
US Top R&B/Hip-Hop Albums (Billboard)	59

Chart (2020)	Position
US Billboard 200	88
US Top R&B/Hip-Hop Albums (Billboard)	53

Chart (2021)	Position
US Billboard 200	81
US Top R&B/Hip-Hop Albums (Billboard)	45

Chart (2022)	Position
US Billboard 200	61
US Top R&B/Hip-Hop Albums (Billboard)	31

Chart (2023)	Position
US Billboard 200	64
US Top R&B/Hip-Hop Albums (Billboard)	24

Chart (2024)	Position
US Billboard 200	115
US Top R&B/Hip-Hop Albums (Billboard)	40

Chart (2025)	Position
US Billboard 200	104
US Top R&B/Hip-Hop Albums (Billboard)	35

== Certifications ==
Certifications and sales for Greatest Hits
Region	Certification	Certified units/sales
Australia (ARIA)	2× Platinum	140,000^{^}
Belgium (BRMA)	Gold	25,000^{*}
Canada (Music Canada)	Platinum	100,000^{^}
Denmark (IFPI Danmark)	2× Platinum	40,000^{‡}
France (SNEP)	Gold	100,000^{*}
Germany (BVMI)	Gold	250,000^{^}
Italy (FIMI)	Gold	25,000^{‡}
Netherlands (NVPI)	Platinum	100,000^{^}
New Zealand (RMNZ)	2× Platinum	30,000^{‡}
Poland (ZPAV)	Gold	50,000^{*}
Switzerland (IFPI Switzerland)	Gold	25,000^{^}
United Kingdom (BPI)	3× Platinum	900,000^{‡}
United States (RIAA)	Diamond	5,330,000
^{*} Sales figures based on certification alone.^{^} Shipments figures based on certification alone.^{‡} Sales+streaming figures based on certification alone.

== See also ==
- List of best-selling albums in the United States
- List of number-one R&B albums of 1998 (U.S.)
