= R U Still Down? (Remember Me) =

Studio album by 2Pac
- Released: November 25, 1997
- Recorded: 1992–1994
- Genres: Hip-hop; gangsta rap
- Length: 102:40
- Labels: Amaru; Interscope; Jive
- Producers: Tony Pizarro; Akshun; Choo; Def Jef; DJ Daryl; Warren G; Khalid A. Hafiz; Johnny "J"; Live Squad; Levant Marcus; Michael Mosley; QDIII; Quimmy Quim; Chris Rosser; Conrad Rosser; Ricky Rouse; Soulshock & Karlin; 2Pac

2Pac chronology
The Don Killuminati: The 7 Day Theory (1996)	R U Still Down? (Remember Me) (1997)	Greatest Hits (1998)

Singles from R U Still Down? (Remember Me)
- 1. "I Wonder If Heaven Got a Ghetto" Released: September 21, 1997; 2. "Do for Love" Released: February 27, 1998

R U Still Down? (Remember Me) is the sixth studio album and second double album by American rapper, 2Pac, released on November 25, 1997. It is his second posthumous release and his first album to be released without his creative input. It contains previously unreleased material from the time period of his albums Strictly 4 My N.I.G.G.A.Z., Thug Life: Volume 1 and Me Against the World. Throughout the album, 2Pac airs his views on life from a time before he became involved in the controversial East Coast–West Coast rivalry. His lyrics foreshadow his death in songs like "Open Fire", "Thug Style" and "Only Fear of Death". The album spawned two hits, "Do for Love" and "I Wonder If Heaven Got a Ghetto", of which "Do for Love" was certified Gold by the RIAA. R U Still Down? (Remember Me) sold 549,000 copies in its first week, and topped the R&B charts in the United States for three weeks.

== Background ==
The album was the first to be released from 2Pac's mother's imprint, Amaru Entertainment and features almost all previously unreleased material, all of which was recorded between 1992 and 1994. Of the material previously released is "Definition of a Thug Nigga"; previously released on the 1993 soundtrack Poetic Justice (soundtrack). Two retitled remixes of "I Wonder If Heaven's Got a Ghetto"; first released as a B-side of the 1993 single "Keep Ya Head Up". "I'm Getting Money"; although technically unreleased, features the same lyrics as the 1994 song "Str8 Ballin'", only with the words, "Straight ballin'", being replaced with the words, "I'm Gettin' Money." "Nothin' But Love" was originally released on the "I Get Around" single, but the version here is a different mix (and shorter).

The album's production was overseen by the producer(s), We Got Kidz Productions; producing entirely new instrumentals for numerous songs, adding new production to various original instrumentals and serving as the album's executive producer, alongside Afeni Shakur and Lisa Smith-Putnam. Other producers hired to create new music for the album were QDIII, Soulshock & Karlin, Mike Mosley, and Ricky Rouse (in partnership with We Got Kidz Productions).

R U Still Down? was the name of several handwritten track lists 2Pac had written in 1993 and 1994 that featured both unreleased songs and songs that would later be issued on Me Against The World and Thug Life: Volume 1. Interscope Records originally planned to release an album under the same name in December 1995, during 2Pac's imprisonment. With no new material being able to be recorded, like R U Still Down? (Remember Me), the album was to feature unused songs from his previous three albums, Strictly 4 My N.I.G.G.A.Z., Thug Life: Volume 1 and Me Against the World. However, this version was never released due to 2Pac's early release from prison, by virtue of signing to Death Row Records.

Two more unreleased songs from this period of 2Pac's career, "Changes" and "God Bless the Dead", were released the following year on the next posthumous release, Greatest Hits. This period of 2Pac's career would then go unexplored until the release of the 2003 song "Runnin' (Dying to Live)", which was followed by the 2004 album Loyal to the Game, all of which was recorded during this same period.

== Critical reception ==
Professional ratings
Review scores
Source	Rating
AllMusic	2.5/5 stars
The Daily Vault	B
Entertainment Weekly	B
NME	4/10
Now	3/5 stars
Spin	8/10
Rolling Stone	2/5 stars

"As always, there's ample self-destructive bullshit," noted Spin, "but as a whole the album's eerie and undeniable." Matt Diehl of Entertainment Weekly give a mixed review, observing how "many of the 26 tracks are barely demo-worthy gangsta pap ... Still, 2Pac's raw talent burns through when his voice goes hoarse with rage [and] his blend of charismatic confidence and Travis Bickle paranoia is a bittersweet reminder of a gifted yet contradictory artist lost in the rap wars."

== Track listing ==
Credits adapted from the album's liner notes.

Disc 1
No.	Title	Writer(s)	Producer(s)	Length
1.	"Redemption"	Ricky Rouse	We Got Kidz Productions; Ricky Rouse^{[a]}	1:48
2.	"Open Fire" (featuring Akshun)	Tupac Shakur; Ronald Williams	Akshun	2:52
3.	"R U Still Down? (Remember Me)"	Shakur; Tony Pizarro; Curtis Mayfield	Tony Pizarro; 2Pac	4:07
4.	"Hellrazor" (featuring Stretch & Val Young)	Shakur; Randy Walker; Quincy Jones III; Valaria Young	QDIII; (original production by Live Squad)^{[c]}	4:15
5.	"Thug Style"	Shakur; Malcolm Greenidge; Katari Cox; Chris Rosser; Conrad Rosser	We Got Kidz Productions; (original production by Chris Rosser^{[c]} & Conrad Rosser)^{[c]}	4:16
6.	"Where Do We Go from Here (Interlude)"	Shakur; Pizarro; George Clinton, Jr.; William Collins; Gary Cooper	Tony Pizarro; 2Pac	4:31
7.	"I Wonder If Heaven Got a Ghetto"	Shakur; Larry Goodman; Derrick McDowell; Roger Troutman; Larry Troutman	Soulshock & Karlin; (original production by Laylaw)^{[c]}	4:21
8.	"Nothing to Lose" (featuring Y?N-Vee)	Shakur; R. Walker; Lorenzo Patterson; Tracy Curry; O'Shea Jackson; Clinton, Jr.; Collins; Bernie Worrell; Anthony Wheaton	2Pac; Live Squad	3:39
9.	"I'm Gettin' Money"	Shakur; Mike Mosley	Mike Mosley; Natures Fynest^{[a]}	3:32
10.	"Lie to Kick It" (featuring Richie Rich)	Shakur; Richard Serrell; Warren Griffin III; Don Blackman	Warren G	3:39
11.	"Fuck All Y'all"	Shakur; Greenidge; Cox	We Got Kidz Productions	4:32
12.	"Let Them Thangs Go"	Shakur; Greenidge; Cox; Clinton, Jr.; Collins; Worrell	We Got Kidz Productions; Quimmy Quim^{[a]}; DJ Daryl^{[b]}	3:33
13.	"Definition of a Thug Nigga"	Shakur; Griffin III; Larry Mizell	2Pac; Warren G	4:09
Total length:				41:43

Disc 2
No.	Title	Writer(s)	Producer(s)	Length
1.	"Ready 4 Whatever" (featuring Big Syke)	Shakur; Tyruss Himes; Johnny Jackson; Gil Scott-Heron	Johnny "J"	4:05
2.	"When I Get Free"	Shakur; Greenidge; Cox; Rouse	We Got Kidz Productions; Ricky Rouse^{[a]}	4:46
3.	"Hold On, Be Strong" (featuring Stretch)	Shakur; Vance Branch; Philip Bailey; Al McKay; Steve Beckmeier	Choo	4:11
4.	"I'm Losin' It" (featuring Big Syke & Spice 1)	Shakur; Himes; Robert Green; Pizarro; Maurice Harding	Tony Pizarro; Def Jef^{[a]}; Levant Marcus^{[a]}	3:55
5.	"Fake Ass Bitches"	Shakur; J. Jackson	Johnny "J"; We Got Kidz Productions^{[b]}	3:10
6.	"Do for Love" (featuring Eric Williams of Blackstreet)	Shakur; Carsten Schack; Kenneth Karlin; Bobby Caldwell; Alfons Kettner	Soulshock & Karlin	4:42
7.	"Enemies with Me" (featuring Dramacydal)	Shakur; Greenidge; Cox; Yafeu Fula; Mutah Beale; Randy Walker; Christopher Walker; David Spradley; Steve Arrington; Garry Shider; Roger Parker; Charles Carter; Clinton, Jr.	We Got Kidz Productions; (original production by Live Squad)^{[c]}	4:15
8.	"Nothin' but Love" (featuring Dave Hollister)	Shakur; Daryl Anderson; Marvin Craig; Mark Adam Wood, Jr.	DJ Daryl; 2Pac	4:28
9.	"16 on Death Row"	Shakur	2Pac; We Got Kidz Productions^{[b]}	5:42
10.	"I Wonder If Heaven Got a Ghetto (Hip-Hop Version)" (featuring Maxee)	Shakur; Goodman; McDowell; R. Troutman; L. Troutman; Larry Blackmon	Soulshock & Karlin	4:40
11.	"When I Get Free II" (featuring Yaki Kadafi)	Shakur; Chris Rosser; Conrad Rosser; Stanley Clarke	Chris Rosser; Conrad Rosser	3:22
12.	"Black Starry Night (Interlude)"	Shakur; Anderson; R. Troutman; L. Troutman	DJ Daryl	0:48
13.	"Only Fear of Death"	Shakur; R. Walker; Diron Rivers; Himes; Walter Burns; Harding; Clinton, Jr; Collins; Worrell	Live Squad	5:09
Total length:				48:45

Notes

- ^{^[a]} signifies a co-producer
- ^{^[b]} signifies an additional producer
- ^{^[c]} signifies the original producer

== Samples ==
Definition of a Thug Nigga

- "Brother's Gonna Work It Out" by Willie Hutch
- "Ashley's Roachclip" by The Soul Searchers
- "Wind Parade" by Donald Byrd
- " Nuthin but a G' Thang (freestyle Remix) by Snoop Doggy Dogg and Dr. Dre
- "Jingle Bells" by James Pierpont

Ready 4 Whatever

- "1980" by Gil Scott-Heron

R U Still Down (Remember Me)

- "He's a Fly Guy" by Curtis Mayfield

Hellrazor

- "Free 'Em All" by J-Flexx

Do for Love

- "What You Won't Do for Love" by Bobby Caldwell

F*** All Y'all

- "Street Life" by Geto Boys

I Wonder if Heaven Got a Ghetto (hip-hop version/single release)

- "Two of Us" by Cameo

Let Them Thangs Go

- "Flash Light" by Parliament

Nothin' but Love

- "Something About That Woman" by Lakeside

Nothing to Lose

- "The Grand Finale" by The D.O.C.
- "Us" by Ice Cube
- "I Wanna Hold On to You" by Mica Paris

When I Get Free II

- "Synthetic Substitution" by Melvin Bliss
- "Concerto for Jazz/Rock Orchestra, Part I" by Stanley Clarke

Where Do We Go From Here

- "May the Force Be With You" by Bootsy's Rubber Band

Black Starry Night (Interlude)

- "Do It Roger" by Roger

I Wonder if Heaven Got a Ghetto (OG remake version)

- "Do It Roger" by Roger

Lie to Kick It

- "Funky President" by James Brown
- "Haboglabotribin'" by Bernard Wright

Only Fear of Death

- "Hihache" by Lafayette Afro Rock Band

== Legacy ==
On his 2008 album Untitled, Nas sampled "I Wonder If Heaven Got a Ghetto" on his song, "Black President". On his verse from Tyler, The Creator’s song Smuckers Kanye West rhymes “I dreamed of 2Pac. He asked me, ‘Are you still down?’ Yeah, my nigga.”

== Charts ==
=== Weekly charts ===
Chart (1997–1998)	Peak position
Australian Albums (ARIA)	50
Austrian Albums (Ö3 Austria)	23
Canadian Albums (Billboard)	12
Dutch Albums (Album Top 100)	29
French Albums (SNEP)	52
German Albums (Offizielle Top 100)	25
New Zealand Albums (RMNZ)	20
Swedish Albums (Sverigetopplistan)	41
UK Albums (Official Charts)	44
UK R&B Albums (Official Charts)	6
US Billboard 200	2
US Top R&B/Hip-Hop Albums (Billboard)	1

=== Year-end charts ===
Chart (1998)	Position
US Billboard 200	38
US Top R&B/Hip-Hop Albums (Billboard)	10

== Certifications ==
Region	Certification	Certified units/sales
Netherlands (NVPI)	Gold	50,000^{^}
New Zealand (RMNZ)	Gold	7,500^{‡}
United Kingdom (BPI)	Gold	100,000^{*}
United States (RIAA)	4× Platinum	2,166,117
^{*} Sales figures based on certification alone.^{^} Shipments figures based on certification alone.^{‡} Sales+streaming figures based on certification alone.

== See also ==
- List of number-one R&B albums of 1997 (U.S.)
- List of number-one R&B albums of 1998 (U.S.)
