= Do for Love =

Single by 2Pac featuring Eric Williams

from the album R U Still Down? (Remember Me)
- B-side: "Brenda's Got a Baby"
- Released: 1998
- Recorded: 1994
- Genre: Hip hop soul; R&B
- Length: 4:40
- Label: Amaru; Interscope; Jive
- Songwriters: Alfons Kettner; Bobby Caldwell; Carsten Schack; Kenneth Karlin; Tupac Shakur
- Producer: Soulshock & Karlin

2Pac singles chronology
"Are U Still Down" (1998)	"Do for Love" (1998)	"Changes" (1998)

Music video
- "Do for Love" on YouTube

"Do for Love" (originally titled "Sucka 4 Luv" in its unreleased form) is the second and final posthumously released single by Tupac Shakur from his second posthumous album R U Still Down? (Remember Me).

Originally recorded for the album Me Against the World, the vocal sample is from "What You Won't Do for Love" by Bobby Caldwell. The song was produced by Soulshock & Karlin. It charted at number 21 on the Billboard Hot 100 in the US, and number 12 in the UK.

== Commercial performance ==
The song was certified Gold by RIAA on March 31, 1998, selling over 500,000 copies.

== Charts ==
=== Weekly charts ===
Weekly chart performance for "Do for Love"
Chart (1998)	Peak position
Australia (ARIA)	52
Canada Dance/Urban (RPM)	9
Netherlands (Dutch Top 40)	17
Netherlands (Single Top 100)	18
New Zealand (Recorded Music NZ)	18
Scottish Singles Sales (Official Charts)	36
Sweden (Sverigetopplistan)	33
UK Singles (Official Charts)	12
UK Hip Hop/R&B (Official Charts)	4
US Billboard Hot 100	21
US Hot R&B/Hip-Hop Songs (Billboard)	10
US Hot Rap Songs (Billboard)	2

=== Year-end charts ===
Year-end chart performance for "Do for Love"
Chart (1998)	Position
Netherlands (Dutch Top 40)	86
Netherlands (Single Top 100)	86
US Billboard Hot 100	89
US Hot R&B/Hip-Hop Songs (Billboard)	46

== Certifications ==
Certifications for "Do for Love"
Region	Certification	Certified units/sales
Denmark (IFPI Danmark)	Gold	45,000^{‡}
New Zealand (RMNZ)	2× Platinum	60,000^{‡}
United Kingdom (BPI)	Platinum	600,000^{‡}
United States (RIAA)	Gold	800,000
^{‡} Sales+streaming figures based on certification alone.
