= Unconditional Love (Tupac Shakur song) =

Single by 2Pac

from the album Greatest Hits and Family Affair
- Released: January 26, 1999
- Recorded: February 1, 1996 (2Pac's vocals and basic tracks); 1998 (overdubs and Mixing)
- Genre: Hip hop; R&B
- Length: 3:58
- Label: Amaru; Death Row; Interscope; Jive
- Songwriter: Tupac Shakur
- Producer: Johnny "J"

2Pac singles chronology
"Changes" (1998)	"Unconditional Love" (1999)	"Baby Don't Cry (Keep Ya Head Up II)" (1999)

Music video
- "Unconditional Love" on YouTube

"Unconditional Love" is a song by 2Pac featuring Nanci Fletcher. The song was released posthumously as promotional single for his 1998 Greatest Hits album. To date, the explicit version of the song has only been released on the promotional single. The song peaked at number 73 on the airplay chart.

== Overview ==
The song was written by 2Pac for fellow Death Row rapper M.C. Hammer. 2Pac recorded a demo of it himself before giving the song to Hammer, this demo is what was used for songs release. Hammer's version was first released on Family Affair in 1998. Hammer would later dance and read the lyrics to this song on the first VH1 Hip Hop Honors in 2004.

According to the Family Affair album insert, "Unconditional Love" lyrics were written and arranged by 2Pac and the songs producer, Johnny "J". Johnny "J" was credited for producing both versions of the song.

Hammer wrote this about the song: "This song was given to me as a gift from the late Tupac Shakur. He told me this was a song about how true love is unconditional. He wanted me to rap it because it reflected what I stand for. The secret is this is also what he stood for. We know that our Bible says that God's love is unconditional. Thank you Tupac for this beautiful, spiritual song." Hammer would later go on to mention his friendship with Tupac and the gift of this song to him in a TBN interview.

== Music video ==
A video for "Unconditional Love" was filmed between January 11–12, 1999. It features Tha Realest (looking and sounding like 2Pac) recording this song in the studio.

== Track listing ==
1. "Unconditional Love" featuring Nanci Fletcher (Clean Version)
2. "Unconditional Love" featuring Nanci Fletcher (LP Version)
