= Ghetto Gospel =

2005 single by 2Pac

Single by 2Pac

from the album Loyal to the Game
- B-side: "Thugs Get Lonely Too"
- Released: January 25, 2005
- Recorded: 1992
- Genre: Conscious hip-hop; gospel
- Length: 3:58
- Label: Amaru; Interscope
- Songwriters: Tupac Shakur; Elton John; Bernie Taupin
- Producer: Eminem

2Pac singles chronology
"Thugs Get Lonely Too" (2004)	"Ghetto Gospel" (2005)	"Untouchable" (2006)

"Ghetto Gospel" is a song by American rapper Tupac Shakur, which was released as the lead single from his 2004 posthumous album Loyal to the Game. The song was produced by American rapper Eminem and samples Elton John's 1971 song "Indian Sunset".

The single topped the charts in the UK (for three weeks), Australia, Czech Republic, and Ireland. In New Zealand, it peaked at number three. The song was written by Tupac as an outcry to "end the war on the streets", addressing the futility of racial difference and dissidence, particularly under the unifying banner of poverty. He also pays tribute to murdered black activists Malcolm X and Bobby Hutton in the song.

In response to Eminem's remix, Elton John said: "how he's managed to meld [Indian Sunset] with Tupac, I'll never know. It's just genius".

== Background and recording ==
Tupac recorded the song for inclusion on the 1992 Christmas-themed compilation album A Very Special Christmas 2, but due to his legal issues, the song was dropped from the compilation and was never released. This version has a much faster tempo and has a third and fourth verse which didn't feature in the 2004 remix. This version was produced by Big D the Impossible, a regular producer on Tupac's first two albums; 2Pacalypse Now and Strictly 4 My N.I.G.G.A.Z... and does not contain the "Indian Sunset" sample, but builds on a sample of Tracy Chapman's song "Crossroads" instead.

Recounting the experience in 2015, Eminem said: "You wouldn't be able to tell the 18/19-year-old Marshall that he would ever be able to get his hands on some Tupac vocals and have that opportunity. It was such a significant piece of history for me and so much fun. I'm like a kid in a candy store; going nuts with the fact that I'm putting beats under his rhymes".

== Music video ==
"Ghetto Gospel" was the only song on Loyal to the Game with an accompanying music video. The music video showcases the last day of a man's life before he is fatally shot in the evening. Neither 2Pac nor Elton John physically appeared in the video – though clips of 2Pac are shown on a television. Towards the end of the music video, the actor (J. D. Williams) is shot but then appears at his own funeral. At the end of the video, there is a message from 2Pac's mother, Afeni Shakur, saying "Remember to keep yourself alive, there is nothing more important than that".

== Track listing ==
CD single

No.	Title	Writer(s)	Sample(s)	Length
1.	"Ghetto Gospel"	Tupac Shakur; Marshall Mathers; Elton John; Bernard Taupin	*Contains elements from "Indian Sunset" by Elton John	3:58

UK CD single

No.	Title	Writer(s)	Producer(s)	Length
1.	"Ghetto Gospel"	Tupac Shakur; Marshall Mathers; Elton John; Bernard Taupin	Eminem	3:58
2.	"Thugs Get Lonely Too" (featuring Nate Dogg)	Shakur; Nathaniel Hale; Mathers	Eminem	4:48

== Official versions ==
- "Ghetto Gospel" (album version explicit)

== Charts ==
=== Weekly charts ===
Chart (2005–2006)	Peak position
Australia (ARIA)	1
Australian Urban (ARIA)	1
Austria (Ö3 Austria Top 40)	3
Belgium (Ultratop 50 Flanders)	25
Belgium (Ultratop 50 Wallonia)	5
Czech Republic Airplay (ČNS IFPI)	1
Denmark (Tracklisten)	20
European Hot 100 (Billboard)	3
Germany (GfK)	3
Hungary (Editors' Choice Top 40)	28
Ireland (IRMA)	1
New Zealand (Recorded Music NZ)	3
Scotland Singles (Official Charts)	1
Switzerland (Schweizer Hitparade)	7
UK Singles (Official Charts)	1
UK Hip Hop/R&B (Official Charts)	1

=== Year-end charts ===
Chart (2005)	Position
Australia (ARIA)	12
Austria (Ö3 Austria Top 40)	21
European Hot 100 (Billboard)	23
Germany (Media Control GfK)	22
Ireland (IRMA)	5
New Zealand (RIANZ)	11
Switzerland (Schweizer Hitparade)	35
UK Singles (OCC)	13

== Certifications ==
Region	Certification	Certified units/sales
Australia (ARIA)	Platinum	70,000^{^}
Denmark (IFPI Danmark)	Gold	45,000^{‡}
Germany (BVMI)	Gold	150,000^{‡}
New Zealand (RMNZ)	2× Platinum	60,000^{‡}
United Kingdom (BPI)	Platinum	600,000^{‡}
^{^} Shipments figures based on certification alone.^{‡} Sales+streaming figures based on certification alone.

== Release history ==
Region	Date	Format(s)	Label(s)	Ref.
United States	November 22, 2004	Urban contemporary radio	Amaru; Interscope	
