= I Wonder If Heaven Got a Ghetto =

Single by 2Pac

from the album R U Still Down? (Remember Me)
- B-side: "When I Get Free"
- Released: September 21, 1997
- Recorded: 1992
- Genre: Hip-hop; R&B
- Length: 4:40
- Label: Amaru; Interscope; Jive
- Songwriters: Tupac Shakur, D.K. McDowell, Larry Troutman, Lawrence Goodman, Roger Troutman
- Producer: Soulshock & Karlin

2Pac singles chronology
"Wanted Dead or Alive" (1997)	"I Wonder If Heaven Got a Ghetto" (1997)	"Are U Still Down" (1998)

Music video
- "I Wonder If Heaven Got a Ghetto" on YouTube

"I Wonder If Heaven Got a Ghetto" is a song by American rapper 2Pac. It was released as the first single from the posthumous album R U Still Down? (Remember Me). The original version, titled "I Wonda if Heaven's Got a Ghetto", was released as a B-side on the 1993 single, "Keep Ya Head Up".

There are two versions of the song on the R U Still Down? (Remember Me) album. One, a remake of the original (using the same sample); the other, a completely new remix, subtitled as the "hip hop version", was the version used for the song's single release.

The song's title originally came from the lyrics of fellow West Coast rapper, Spice 1's 1992 song, "Welcome to the Ghetto", and contains a direct sample of Cameo's 1978 song, Two of Us.

Many of the song's lyrics were reused in 2Pac's 1992 single "Changes" .

Rapper Nas interpolated "I Wonder if Heaven Got a Ghetto" in the song "Black President" from his untitled 2008 album. The line "And though it seems heaven sent/We ain't ready to have a black president" is used repeatedly as the song's chorus. Rapper The Game used the instrumental in the beginning of his song "I Didn't Wanna Write This Song" off of his studio album Born 2 Rap.

== Music video ==
In the Lionel C. Martin directed music video from September 14–15, 1997, the perspective is a first-person viewpoint of Shakur. After being shot, he stumbles to a nunnery in fictional Rukahs, New Mexico. ('Rukahs' spelled backward is 'Shakur'.) The license plate of the car that Shakur gets in with the older man reads "61671", which references Shakur's birthday on June 16, 1971. The room he goes into with the girl is room number 7. The clock in the background at the end is set to 4:03, the same time Shakur officially died at 4:03, Tupac also appears at the end, he goes into Amaru Diner, Amaru being his middle name.

In the first 5 seconds "...rapper Tupac Shakur shot multiple times" is heard from the helicopter.

The video also features several notable figures. Mother Teresa is seen getting on a bus, and already on the bus are Jimi Hendrix, Martin Luther King Jr., Huey P. Newton, and Elvis Presley.

== Charts ==
=== Weekly charts ===
Weekly chart performance for "I Wonder If Heaven Got a Ghetto"
Chart (1997–1998)	Peak position
Australia (ARIA)	70
New Zealand (Recorded Music NZ)	11
UK Singles (Official Charts)	21
UK R&B (Official Charts Company)	4
US Billboard Hot 100	67
US Hot R&B/Hip-Hop Songs (Billboard)	14
US Hot Rap Songs	18

=== Year-end charts ===
Year-end chart performance for "I Wonder If Heaven Got a Ghetto"
Chart (1998)	Position
US Hot R&B/Hip-Hop Songs (Billboard)	77
