= Loyal to the Game =

Studio album by 2Pac
- Released: December 14, 2004
- Recorded: 1991–1994 (2Pac's vocals); 2003–2004 (production, guest vocals and mixing)
- Genre: Gangsta rap
- Length: 64:56
- Labels: Amaru; Interscope
- Producers: Eminem; DJ Quik; Luis Resto; Raphael Saadiq; Red Spyda; Scott Storch

2Pac chronology
2Pac Live (2004)	Loyal to the Game (2004)	Live at the House of Blues (2005)

Singles from Loyal to the Game
- 1. "Thugs Get Lonely Too" Released: September 23, 2004; 2. "Ghetto Gospel" Released: April 25, 2005

Loyal to the Game is the ninth studio album and fifth posthumous studio album by American rapper Tupac Shakur. It was the first posthumous album released by his mother, Afeni Shakur, through her label Amaru Entertainment without the involvement of Suge Knight or Death Row Records. The album was produced by Eminem and consists of remixes of previously unreleased music recorded by Tupac before his death in 1996. Released in the United States on December 14, 2004, Loyal to the Game debuted at number one on the US Billboard 200 chart. It was later certified Platinum by the Recording Industry Association of America (RIAA).

== Background ==
During an interview with MTV, Eminem stated he was so moved by Tupac's life and work that he wrote a letter to Tupac's mother, Afeni Shakur, asking her to consider letting him produce his next album. Shakur agreed, allowing Eminem to produce three new songs for the 2003 soundtrack album, Tupac: Resurrection, and the entirety of Loyal to the Game, bar bonus content.

All songs on the album were recorded prior to Tupac's involvement in the controversial East Coast–West Coast hip-hop rivalry, serving as the second posthumous album released consisting of material from this time period, the first being 1997's R U Still Down? (Remember Me). Although the songs are mostly unreleased, the title track, "Loyal to the Game", was previously released on the cassette edition of the 1994 soundtrack album Above the Rim, and subsequently as the B-side to the album's lead single, "Regulate".

The album featured two singles: "Thugs Get Lonely Too", which served as a promotional single for the album, and "Ghetto Gospel", which served as the lead single. The album has a version of "Ghetto Gospel" with a much faster tempo and contains a third and fourth verse which did not appear in Eminem's remix.

== Production ==
Loyal to the Game marks the only posthumous Tupac album not to feature any original production. When remixing these songs, Eminem used various unusual production techniques, namely, modifying the pace and pitch of Tupac's voice to better suit the instrumentals he produced. The style of the production on the album fitted more to the form of a Shady/Aftermath release, of which Eminem partly created, than it did to any original or previous posthumous Tupac release. There were also various uses of cutting and pasting vocals to produce new words synonymous with rap culture at that time, such as making it sound as though Tupac is saying, "2005", "G-Unit", "Obie Trice" and "Em".

The album includes four bonus remixes by Scott Storch, Red Spyda, Raphael Saadiq, and DJ Quik.

== Critical reception and commercial performance ==
Professional ratings
Review scores
Source	Rating
AllMusic	3/5 stars
AllHipHop	3.5/5 stars
The Independent	2/5 stars
Los Angeles Times	2/4 stars
Now	2/5 stars
PopMatters	5/10
RapReviews	8/10
Rolling Stone	3/5 stars
Vibe	3.5/5 stars

Loyal to the Game debuted at number one on the US Billboard 200 chart, with first-week-sales of over 330,000 copies in its first week. On February 15, 2005, the album was certified platinum by the Recording Industry Association of America (RIAA) for sales of over a million copies in the US. As of September 2011, the album has sold 1,204,124 copies in the United States.

== Track listing ==
No.	Title	Producer	Length
1.	"Soldier Like Me (Return of the Soulja)" (featuring Eminem)	Eminem, Luis Resto (Originally produced by Big D The Impossible and Randy "Stretch" Walker)	3:50
2.	"The Uppercut" (featuring E.D.I. Mean and Young Noble of the Outlawz)	Eminem, Luis Resto (Originally produced by 2Pac)	3:50
3.	"Out on Bail"	Eminem, Luis Resto (Originally produced by LG)	3:54
4.	"Ghetto Gospel" (featuring Elton John)	Eminem, Luis Resto (Originally produced by Big D The Impossible)	3:58
5.	"Black Cotton" (featuring Eminem and Kastro and Young Noble of the Outlawz)	Eminem, Luis Resto (Originally produced by Big D The Impossible)	5:03
6.	"Loyal to the Game" (featuring G-Unit)	Eminem, Luis Resto (Originally produced by Reginald Heard)	3:23
7.	"Thugs Get Lonely Too" (featuring Nate Dogg)	Eminem, Luis Resto (Originally produced by Randy "Stretch" Walker)	4:48
8.	"N.I.G.G.A. (Never Ignorant, Getting Goals Accomplished)" (featuring Jadakiss)	Eminem, Luis Resto (Originally produced by Big D The Impossible)	3:02
9.	"Who Do You Love?"	Eminem, Luis Resto (Originally produced by 2Pac and Randy "Stretch" Walker)	3:28
10.	"Crooked Nigga Too"	Eminem, Luis Resto (Originally produced by Big D The Impossible)	2:55
11.	"Don't You Trust Me?"	Eminem, Luis Resto (Originally produced by Big D The Impossible)	4:55
12.	"Hennessey" (featuring Obie Trice)	Eminem, Luis Resto (Originally produced by Thug Music)	3:27
13.	"Thug 4 Life"	Eminem, Luis Resto (Originally produced by Johnny "J")	2:54

Bonus tracks
No.	Title	Producer(s)	Length
14.	"Po Nigga Blues (Scott Storch Remix)" (featuring Ron Isley)	Scott Storch (Originally produced by Daryl L. Anderson (DJ Daryl))	3:38
15.	"Hennessey (Red Spyda Remix)" (featuring E.D.I. Mean and Sleepy Brown)	Red Spyda	3:18
16.	"Crooked Nigga Too (Raphael Saadiq Remix)" (featuring Raphael Saadiq)	Raphael Saadiq (Originally produced by Big D The Impossible)	4:02
17.	"Loyal to the Game (DJ Quik Remix)" (featuring Big Syke)	DJ Quik	4:20

Sample credits

- "Ghetto Gospel" contains a sample of "Indian Sunset" performed by Elton John.
- "Don't You Trust Me?" contains a sample of "Do You Have a Little Time" performed by Dido.
- "N.I.G.G.A." contains a sample of "(Don't Worry) If There's a Hell Below, We're All Going to Go" performed by Curtis Mayfield.

Notes

- Originally, "Out on Bail" was intended for an unreleased version of Thug Life: Volume 1 but due to controversial reasons, the original version did not make the final cut and was remixed after Eminem went on board. The original version can be found on YouTube.

== Original Versions ==
“Judgement Day” (Soldier Like Me) featuring Stretch, Mopreme Shakur & Sister Soulja.

”The Uppercut” information unknown.

“Out On Bail” was meant to be released on Thug Life Vol. 1.

“Ghetto Gospel” 2 Versions of the song, one was Remixed and the other version has 4 Pac verses.

“Black Cotton” featuring Mouse Man.

“Loyal 2 The Game” featuring Treach & The Riddler.

“Thugs Get Lonely Too” a version of the original song featured Tech N9ne and was meant for the R U Still Down (Remember Me).

“N.I.G.G.A.” featuring Mopreme Shakur & Mouse Man.

“Who Do U Love” fearuring Stretch.

“Crooked Nigga Too” featuring Stretch

“Don’t U Trust Me”.

“Hennessey” featuring Mopreme Shakur & Big Syke.

“Thug 4 Life” featuring Stretch.

Most of the songs are available on YouTube

== Charts ==
=== Weekly charts ===
Weekly chart performance for Loyal to the Game
Chart (2004–2005)	Peak position
Australian Albums (ARIA)	21
Australian Urban Albums (ARIA)	3
Belgian Albums (Ultratop Flanders)	100
Canadian Albums (Billboard)	7
Dutch Albums (Album Top 100)	44
French Albums (SNEP)	55
German Albums (Offizielle Top 100)	50
Irish Albums (IRMA)	20
Italian Albums (FIMI)	68
New Zealand Albums (RMNZ)	31
Scottish Albums (Official Charts)	75
Swiss Albums (Schweizer Hitparade)	21
UK Albums (Official Charts)	20
UK R&B Albums (Official Charts)	5
US Billboard 200	1
US Top R&B/Hip-Hop Albums (Billboard)	1
US Top Rap Albums (Billboard)	1

=== Year-end charts ===
Year-end chart performance for Loyal to the Game
Chart (2005)	Position
UK Albums (OCC)	143
US Billboard 200	51
US Top R&B/Hip-Hop Albums (Billboard)	21

== Certifications ==
Certifications for Loyal to the Game
Region	Certification	Certified units/sales
New Zealand (RMNZ)	Gold	7,500^{^}
United Kingdom (BPI)	Gold	100,000^{^}
United States (RIAA)	Platinum	1,000,000^{^}
^{^} Shipments figures based on certification alone.

== Release history ==
Region	Date
United States	December 14, 2004
