= Thugs Get Lonely Too =

Single by 2Pac featuring Nate Dogg

from the album Loyal to the Game
- Released: September 23, 2004
- Recorded: 1992 – 2004
- Genre: R&B; gangsta rap
- Length: 4:48
- Label: Interscope Records
- Songwriters: Tupac Shakur; Marshall Mathers; Nathaniel Hale
- Producer: Eminem

2Pac singles chronology
"Runnin' (Dying to Live)" (2003)	"Thugs Get Lonely Too" (2004)	"Ghetto Gospel" (2005)

Nate Dogg singles chronology
"Groupie Luv" (2004)	"Thugs Get Lonely Too" (2004)	"Gangsta Party" (2005)

"Thugs Get Lonely Too" is a song by rapper Tupac Shakur featuring Nate Dogg. The song was released as a 12" promo single for his 2004 posthumous album Loyal to the Game. The song was also used as the b-side to the album's lead single "Ghetto Gospel".

It charted at number 55 on the Hot R&B/Hip-Hop Songs chart and number 98 on the Billboard Hot 100. As the song was released as a promotional single only, no official music video for the song was created. In 1993.

== Original Version ==
The original version of "Thugs Get Lonely Too" was recorded during the Strictly 4 My N.I.G.G.A.Z. & Thug Life era. It was recorded at Toyz Recording Studios in Baltimore, MD.and produced by Frank Starchak and Tupac. Rick Heyman sampled from the song "If I Was Your Girlfriend" by Prince. The title of the song also resembles a track called Gigolos Get Lonely Too by The Time, composed by Prince. It also originally featured a verse recorded from underground rap artist Tech N9ne as the two had met multiple times and were close friends before his death. When QD3 did the soundtrack to the film "Gangland" Tech recorded his verse, but the final version wasn't released until years later on YouTube.

== Track listing ==
UK CD single
No.	Title	Writer(s)	Producer(s)	Length
1.	"Thugs Get Lonely Too" (feat. Nate Dogg)	Tupac Shakur; Marshall Mathers; Nathaniel Hale	Eminem	4:48
2.	"Hennessey" (Red Spyda remix) (feat. E.D.I. and Sleepy Brown)	Shakur; Andy Thelusma; Malcolm Greenidge; Patrick Brown	Red Spyda	3:18
Total length:				8:06

== Weekly charts ==
Charts	Peak position
US Billboard Hot 100	98
US Hot R&B/Hip-Hop Songs (Billboard)	55
US Rhythmic Airplay (Billboard)	31
