= YGD Tha Top Dogg =

Top Dogg
- Also known as: YGD, YGD Tha Top Dogg
- Born: Derrick Wade; February 17, 1979 (age 47); Grenada, Mississippi
- Origin: Compton, California, U.S.
- Genres: West Coast Hip hop; G-funk
- Years active: 1997–present
- Labels: Darkside Music (Current); Death Row, Priority (1998-2001)

Derrick Wade (born February 17, 1979, in Grenada, Mississippi) better known by his stage name Top Dogg and YGD Tha Top Dogg is an American rapper. Raised in Compton, California, Top Dogg was signed to Death Row Records.

== Career ==
In 1998, Death Row Records CEO Suge Knight planned to launch many new rappers to come for the second generation of Death Row Records. Although he was incarcerated, he pushed rapper Top Dogg (also known as YGD) as his first new face making his television debut appearance in the video "All About U" on the 2Pac "Greatest Hits" album replacing Snoop Dogg. Top Dogg had generated a buzz from a hidden track on the "Gang Related" titled "Goin Back To Cali" aimed toward Biggie Smalls & Puff Daddy. The video, "All About U," received heavy play and Suge followed in 1999 with "Suge Knight Represents: Chronic 2000" album to introduce a brand new roster headed by Top Dogg, Tha Realest, and Soopafly, with Daz Dillinger as the veteran lead-producer.

In 2000, the music video for Top Dogg's "Cindafella" track received minor airplay with an innovative concept produced by TC as many earlier videos and directed by K.C. Amos, and his album "Every Dog Has His Day" was shelved as his contract expired and he was not renewed.

== Discography ==
=== Albums ===
- 2010: The Renegade

=== Singles ===
- 1997: Going Back To Cali
- 1998: All About U (Remix) feat. 2Pac, Nate Dogg, Dru Down & Top Dogg
- 1999: They Wanna Be Like Us
- 1999: We Don't Love Em'
- 1999: Top Dogg Cindafella

=== Mixtapes ===
- 2008: Top Dogg Vol. 1 - Mix Tape

=== Compilation albums ===
- 1999: Suge Knight Represents: Chronic 2000 (Death Row compilation CD).
- 2000: Too Gangsta for Radio (Death Row compilation CD).

=== Other related releases ===
- 1999: Dr. Dre feat. Doobie, YGD tha Top Dogg - Hoe Hopper - (Unreleased Death Row Track)
- 1999 : Dr. Dre feat. YGD Top Dogg - Die Muthafucka Die - (Unreleased Death Row Track)
- 2011 : The Stomper feat. Spanky Loco & YGD Top Dogg - We Bang Wicked prod. Gnostik Mindz
- 2012 : Mr. Ensane & YGD Top Dogg - Life prod. Ill Slim Collin
- 2023 : YGD Top Dogg & Mr. Ensane - OG Life Lessons prod. Ill Slim Collin
