= Maria (Danish singer) =

Danish singer and songwriter (born 1978)

- Born: Maria Jensen; 13 May 1978 (age 47)
- Origin: Denmark
- Genres: Soul, R&B
- Occupations: Singer, songwriter
- Years active: 2001–present
- Labels: DreamWorks Records (2002–2004); ART:ERY (2015–2016) Kintsugi Records ( 2021-Present)

Maria Lumiere (née Jensen on 13 May 1978), known as just Maria, is a Danish singer and songwriter.

== Career ==
Born in Denmark, she grew up living in different parts of Europe. Despite her parents' initial hesitation and the fact that she did not come from a musical family, she decided to pursue a career as a singer. She was eventually discovered and signed by Soulshock, from the writing and production duo Soulshock & Karlin, to Soulpower/DreamWorks Records. Her first single "I Give, You Take" was released in 2003 and received success on R&B/Top 40 radio. It reached #33 on the Billboard Pop 100 chart. Her debut album, My Soul was released in September 2003. DreamWorks failed to follow up with promotion for a second single, and she was let go when DreamWorks Records was sold, shortly before the label folded.

Afterwards, she ended up studying acting in New York, and doing other ventures such as voiceover work, and writing for other artists (such as Mikkel Solnado's album It's Only Love, Give It Away).

She collaborated with producer Holbek (alias Steen Rock) on the song “Hudløs” from his album Frit Løb in 2011.

The following year, she announced she was working on some new music, and her three-track EP Oh So Full of Promise was released in early 2013.

Next To You, written by Maria and produced by Chris Colonna from The Bumblebeez, was featured in the 80 year-anniversary campaign for Lacoste. Additionally, her song "Missing piece" was featured in a 2013 Pandora campaign.

Her second full-length album Oh So Full of Promise was released on digital and streaming services through her independent label Kintsugi Records. She collaborated with the artist PEDER on the song "The Last Time."

== Personal life ==
Maria is of mixed Guyanese and Danish descent.

== Discography ==
=== Albums ===
- My Soul (2003)
- Oh So Full of Promise

=== EPs ===
- Oh So Full of Promise – EP (2013)

=== Singles ===
- "I Give, You Take" (2003)
- "Make You Stay" (2012)
- "Missing Piece" (2013)

=== Collaborations ===
- "She will never learn" DEEW ( Buddha bar )
- "Hudløs" (2011) (with Holbek)
- "Next To You" (2012) (with Bumblebeez)
- " Hold you back" (Feat Maria & Fuat Talay)- Mashti &Jean Von Baden Buddha Bar Hotel Paris
- "The Last Time" (2016) (with PEDER)
