= Changes (Tupac Shakur song) =

1998 single by 2Pac

Single by 2Pac

from the album Greatest Hits
- Released: October 13, 1998
- Recorded: 1992; 1998 (remix)
- Genre: Conscious hip-hop; political hip-hop; R&B
- Length: 4:43; 4:30 (remix); 4:54 (remix) (with longer piano intro)
- Label: Amaru; Death Row; Interscope; Jive
- Songwriters: Tupac Shakur; Deon Evans; Bruce Hornsby
- Producers: Big D the Impossible; Trackmasters (remix)

2Pac singles chronology
"Do for Love" (1998)	"Changes" (1998)	"Unconditional Love" (1999)

Music video
- "Changes" on YouTube

"Changes" is a song by American rapper 2Pac. It was recorded in 1992 before being remixed and released as a single from Shakur's Greatest Hits compilation on October 13, 1998. The song features Talent, an R&B trio from Kansas City consisting of Marlon "Castor Troy" Hatcher, Keith "Casino" Murrell and Ernest "Bishop" Dixon that was active from 1998 to 2005. The song discusses societal conflicts, particularly race relations and classism, at times contrasting with broader global conflicts and difficulties of life in the ghetto.

"Changes" samples Bruce Hornsby and the Range's 1986 song "The Way It Is". The chorus was sung by Talent. "Changes" received a nomination for Best Rap Solo Performance at the 2000 Grammy Awards, making it the only posthumous song to be nominated in this category. The song is widely regarded as one of Shakur's greatest songs, as well as one of the greatest rap songs of all time. In 2017, Consequence ranked the song number two on their list of the 20 greatest Tupac Shakur songs.

== Production and recording ==
The song was originally recorded during his tenure at Interscope Records in 1992 and was produced by Big D The Impossible (Deon Evans). "Changes" was later remixed in 1998 by Poke from Trackmasters.

The song re-uses lines from "I Wonder If Heaven Got a Ghetto" which was recorded during the same year, and samples the 1986 hit "The Way It Is" by Bruce Hornsby and the Range. The chorus of "The Way It Is" was slightly reworded and sung by Talent and was used for this song. At times Tupac re-used lines from other unreleased songs because he planned to make an updated version at a later date. However, since his death many of the unreleased and unmastered songs have been officially released.

The remixed version released in 1998 has notably different percussion, and a few minor changes to the musical elements. The chorus on the original track features a notable difference in a vocal sample of the line, "It's like that and that's the way it is", from Run DMC's "It's Like That", which is also played twice during the intro. The second chorus adds the Ice Cube line, "Dope dealers, you're as bad as the police", from his song, "Us". The third chorus omits the Ice Cube sample and adds B-boy-style chant with an unknown person repeating, "Clap your hands and feel it, clap your hands and feel it!" until the song ends.

=== Samples ===
The song is an interpretation of the 1986 hit "The Way It Is" by Bruce Hornsby and the Range, and samples the drum loop from the 1984 song "Set It Off" by Strafe. Bay Area rapper E-40 had interpreted the song already on his track, "Things'll Never Change", for his album Tha Hall of Game. The Tupac "Changes" instrumental was used by Insane Clown Posse in "Mom Song", a Mother's Day song. Nas sampled the song for his song "Black President". Polo G interpolated "Changes" on his 2020 song "Wishing for a Hero".

== Overview ==
The song was a number-one hit in Norway and the Netherlands and reached the top ten in the singles charts of several other countries, including number three in the United Kingdom, which gained Tupac a broader audience.

Released posthumously on his album Greatest Hits, the song talks about all of the different issues that were related to Tupac's era of influence—notably racism, police brutality, drugs and gang violence. The "Huey" that 2Pac mentions in the song ("two shots in the dark, now Huey's dead") is Huey P. Newton, founder of the Black Panther Party. The song refers to the possibility of a black president of the United States, claiming "we ain't ready". Further, the last verse of the song refers to Tupac's imagining himself being shot to death, mimicking the sound of the gun with the phrase "rat-a-tat-tat-tat-tat".

The Chris Hafner-directed music video is a compilation of a number of previous music videos Tupac released in addition to home videos and never-before-seen pictures, similar to the format of The Notorious B.I.G.'s "Dead Wrong", released in 1999.

== Critical reception ==
Chuck Taylor of Billboard wrote, "This latest posthumous Tupac Shakur release is an unquestionable smash. Cleverly sampling Bruce Hornsby and the Range's No. 1 "The Way It Is" from 1986, the rapper masterfully talks to his disciples like a pastor delivering a motivating and positive sermon to his congregation. He tells of the trials and tribulations of life in the ghetto and is blunt about the need for change and an end to black-on-black violence, saying that 'misplaced hate makes disgrace to races.' This track is a must for any playlist and ironic in that its all-important message surfaces after the artist became a victim of what his song addresses." The track was selected by the Vatican as part of their 2009 MySpace music playlist.

"Changes" is widely regarded as one of Shakur's greatest songs. In 2017, Consequence ranked the song number two on their list of the 20 greatest Tupac Shakur songs.

== Accolades ==
"Changes" was nominated for Best Rap Solo Performance at the Grammy Awards of 2000 and remains the only posthumous song to be nominated in this category. It was also nominated at the MTV Video Music Award for Best Editing in a Video & Best Rap Video in 1999.

== Charts ==
=== Weekly charts ===
Chart (1998–1999)	Peak position
Australia (ARIA)	7
Austria (Ö3 Austria Top 40)	6
Belgium (Ultratop 50 Flanders)	2
Belgium (Ultratop 50 Wallonia)	11
Canada (Nielsen SoundScan)	14
Canada Top Singles (RPM)	19
Canada Dance/Urban (RPM)	3
Denmark (Tracklisten)	7
European Hot 100 Singles (Music & Media)	6
Finland (Suomen virallinen lista)	13
France (SNEP)	39
Germany (GfK)	2
Ireland (IRMA)	5
Netherlands (Dutch Top 40)	1
Netherlands (Single Top 100)	1
New Zealand (Recorded Music NZ)	3
Norway (VG-lista)	1
Poland Airplay (Music & Media)	5
Scottish Singles Sales (Official Charts)	10
Sweden (Sverigetopplistan)	3
Switzerland (Schweizer Hitparade)	2
UK Singles (Official Charts)	3
UK Indie (Official Charts)	1
UK Hip Hop/R&B (Official Charts)	1
US Billboard Hot 100	32
US Hot R&B/Hip-Hop Songs (Billboard)	12
US Pop Airplay (Billboard)	38

=== Year-end charts ===
Chart (1999)	Position
Belgium (Ultratop 50 Flanders)	26
Belgium (Ultratop 50 Wallonia)	45
Canada Dance/Urban (RPM)	18
Germany (Media Control)	20
Netherlands (Dutch Top 40)	22
Netherlands (Single Top 100)	11
New Zealand (RIANZ)	32
Romania (Romanian Top 100)	81
Sweden (Hitlistan)	18
Switzerland (Schweizer Hitparade)	12
UK Singles (OCC)	64
US Hot R&B/Hip-Hop Singles & Tracks (Billboard)	95

== Certifications ==
Region	Certification	Certified units/sales
Belgium (BRMA)	Gold	25,000^{*}
Denmark (IFPI Danmark)	Platinum	90,000^{‡}
Germany (BVMI)	Gold	250,000^{^}
Italy (FIMI)	Gold	50,000^{‡}
Netherlands (NVPI)	Gold	50,000^{^}
New Zealand (RMNZ)	4× Platinum	120,000^{‡}
Sweden (GLF)	Platinum	30,000^{^}
Switzerland (IFPI Switzerland)	Gold	25,000^{^}
United Kingdom (BPI)	2× Platinum	1,200,000^{‡}
^{*} Sales figures based on certification alone.^{^} Shipments figures based on certification alone.^{‡} Sales+streaming figures based on certification alone.
