= List of Billboard number-one R&B albums of 1998 =

These are the Billboard magazine R&B albums that reached number one in 1998.

== Chart history ==
Issue date	Album	Artist
January 3	Live	Erykah Badu
January 10	My Way	Usher
January 17	My Way	Usher
January 24	My Way	Usher
January 31	Money, Power & Respect	The Lox
February 7	My Balls and My Word	Young Bleed
February 14	Anytime	Brian McKnight
February 21	Anytime	Brian McKnight
February 28	Anytime	Brian McKnight
March 7	Charge It 2 da Game	Silkk the Shocker
March 14	Charge It 2 da Game	Silkk the Shocker
March 21	My Homies	Scarface
March 28	My Homies	Scarface
April 4	Life or Death	C-Murder
April 11	The Pillage	Cappadonna
April 18	Moment of Truth	Gang Starr
April 25	I Got the Hook-Up	Soundtrack / various artists
May 2	I Got the Hook-Up	Soundtrack / various artists
May 9	I Got the Hook-Up	Soundtrack / various artists
May 16	Capital Punishment	Big Pun
May 23	There's One in Every Family	Fiend
May 30	Capital Punishment	Big Pun
June 6	It's Dark and Hell Is Hot	DMX
June 13	It's Dark and Hell Is Hot	DMX
June 20	It's Dark and Hell Is Hot	DMX
June 27	It's Dark and Hell Is Hot	DMX
July 4	MP da Last Don	Master P
July 11	MP da Last Don	Master P
July 18	El Niño	Def Squad
July 25	Am I My Brother's Keeper	Kane & Abel
August 1	N.O.R.E.	Noreaga
August 8	Life in 1472	Jermaine Dupri
August 15	Life in 1472	Jermaine Dupri
August 22	Da Game Is to Be Sold, Not to Be Told	Snoop Dogg
August 29	Da Game Is to Be Sold, Not to Be Told	Snoop Dogg
September 5	Da Game Is to Be Sold, Not to Be Told	Snoop Dogg
September 12	The Miseducation of Lauryn Hill	Lauryn Hill
September 19	The Miseducation of Lauryn Hill	Lauryn Hill
September 26	The Miseducation of Lauryn Hill	Lauryn Hill
October 3	The Miseducation of Lauryn Hill	Lauryn Hill
October 10	The Miseducation of Lauryn Hill	Lauryn Hill
October 17	Vol. 2... Hard Knock Life	Jay-Z
October 24	Vol. 2... Hard Knock Life	Jay-Z
October 31	Vol. 2... Hard Knock Life	Jay-Z
November 7	Vol. 2... Hard Knock Life	Jay-Z
November 14	R.	R. Kelly
November 21	Tical 2000: Judgement Day	Method Man
November 28	Greatest Hits	2Pac
December 5	Greatest Hits	2Pac
December 12	Greatest Hits	2Pac
December 19	Greatest Hits	2Pac
December 26	Doc's da Name 2000	Redman

== See also ==
- 1998 in music
- R&B number-one hits of 1998 (USA)
