= Dear Mama =

1995 single by Tupac Shakur

- US cover

Single by 2Pac

from the album Me Against the World
- B-side: "Old School"
- Released: February 9, 1995
- Studio: Encore Studios (Burbank, California)
- Genre: Hip-hop
- Length: 4:39
- Label: Interscope; Jive
- Songwriter: Tupac Shakur
- Producer: Tony Pizarro

2Pac singles chronology
"Cradle to the Grave" (1994)	"Dear Mama" (1995)	"So Many Tears" (1995)

Music video
- "Dear Mama" on YouTube

"Dear Mama" is a song by American rapper 2Pac from his third studio album, Me Against the World (1995). It was released on February 9, 1995, as the lead single from the album. Dedicated to his mother, Afeni Shakur, Shakur details his childhood poverty and his mother's addiction to crack cocaine, but argues that his love and deep respect for his mother supersede bad memories. The song became his first top ten on the Billboard Hot 100, peaking at number nine. It also topped the Hot Rap Singles and Hot Dance Music Maxi-Singles, and made success in three other US charts. As of March 2021, "Dear Mama" is certified 3× Platinum by the Recording Industry Association of America (RIAA).

"Dear Mama" has been consistently ranked among the best of its genre, appearing on numerous "greatest" lists. In 2009, the song was inducted into the National Recording Registry by the Library of Congress, who deemed it a work that is "culturally, historically, or aesthetically important, and/or inform or reflect life in the United States", making it the first hip-hop recording by a soloist to be inducted. In a press release, the organization called the song "a moving and eloquent homage to both the murdered rapper's own mother and all mothers struggling to maintain a family in the face of addiction, poverty and societal indifference."

== Background ==
The song is a tribute to Shakur's mother, Afeni Shakur. She and her husband were active members of the Black Panther Party in New York in the late 1960s and early 1970s. Shakur was born a month after his mother was acquitted of more than 150 charges of "Conspiracy against the United States government and New York landmarks" in the New York "Panther 21" court case. She was often absent during his childhood in favor of being an activist, and also became addicted to crack cocaine during Shakur's adolescence. Shakur was kicked out by Afeni at age 17, and they had little contact for many years. Having "lost all respect" for his mother, he subsequently moved into a vacant apartment with friends and began writing poetry and rap lyrics. In 1990, realizing her habit was out-of-control, Afeni enrolled in a twelve-step program at a drug and alcohol treatment center in Norwalk, Connecticut. Following her completion, she reconciled with her son, who was at this point a successful rapper. In 2023, Billy Garland, Shakur's father, admitted he was upset about being labeled a "coward" in "Dear Mama", in which Shakur raps: "No love for my daddy 'cause the coward wasn't there", before remarking his father as dead.

== Production ==
Record producer Tony Pizarro recalled that Shakur frequently referenced the idea of "Dear Mama" across multiple songs, which led Pizarro to believe it could be developed into a standalone track. He stated that Shakur later made a concept for the song and referenced "In My Wildest Dreams" (1978) by Joe Sample of the Crusaders as a musical inspiration. Pizarro prepared the beat based on the sample, after which Shakur recorded and completed the vocals for the track. According to Master Tee's 2023 lawsuit, the initial version of "Dear Mama" was recorded in October 1993, with Shakur writing the lyrics down on a toilet.

The song was written shortly before Shakur served a prison term. Upon completion of the track, Shakur called close friend Jada Pinkett-Smith, remarking "I wrote this song about our mothers and I want you to hear it." Similar to Afeni Shakur, Pinkett-Smith's mother had struggled with drug addiction, and their experiences growing up with this as children led to their friendship. She later remarked that the song gave her a "rush of emotions" upon her first listen. Johnny "J", one of Shakur's producers, noted that his emotional and vulnerable songs were his personal favorites.

In a 1995 interview with the Los Angeles Times, Shakur revealed he was influenced by emotionally expressive songs including Don McLean’s "Vincent" (1972), which he described as deeply "touching" lyrically. He explained that he wanted his own music to evoke similar emotional responses in listeners, and took for example that "Dear Mama" was written to directly appeal to his peers' emotional experiences. When questioned about misogyny in his lyrics, Shakur defended his music, noting that he worked in the studio with women and played his songs for women before their release, remarking that he wrote "Dear Mama" for Afeni due to his unconditional love.

In May 2016, DJ King Assassin, Shakur's DJ, shared an earlier version of "Dear Mama" online. He described the differences between the official version and the earlier recording, stating that the original version differed significantly in its hook, which initially sampled a song by rapper Yo-Yo, a collaborator associated with Ice Cube's Da Lench Mob. According to him, the sampled lyric—"Wouldn't be a damn thing without a woman"—was from Ice Cube's "It's a Man's World", and the scratching on the track was performed by King Assassin himself. He further explained that, shortly after the track's initial completion at Echo Sound Studios in Los Angeles, Shakur returned to the studio and informed the team that the Yo-Yo sample had to be removed due to a refusal to grant clearance by Pat Charbonet. As a result, the sample was taken out of the song. King Assassin added that an excerpt featuring comedian Richard Pryor, which appears in the earlier version, was also omitted from the officially released recording.

== Writing and analysis ==
Dear Mama

You always was committed,

A poor single mother on welfare, tell me how you did it.

There's no way I can pay you back,

But the plan is to show you that I understand; You are appreciated

In "Dear Mama", Shakur praises his mother's courage, arguing that many mothers share this trait, and also describes the "highs and lows" of her past. In a cultural and historical context, "Dear Mama" is one of notable hip-hop songs in which male rappers state their reverence for their mothers. Statistics show that a disproportionate number of African-American households are headed by single mothers, and author Mickey Hess asserts that their bravery and role in their children's lives leads to their status as an "eternal symbol of love" in their offspring's eyes. In another one of his book, Is Hip Hop Dead?: The Past, Present, and Future of America's Most Wanted Music, he asserts that his mother's appearance in Shakur's music is designed to establish credibility with listeners. In this sense, he "connects himself to black radical history through his mother's affiliation with the Black Panthers", and explains that his music is autobiographical, illustrating that 2Pac, as a performer, and Tupac Shakur, as a person, are one and the same. In addition, Shakur recorded the tune as he knew he was not the only person to grow up with a parent struggling with drug addiction.

And even as a crack fiend, mama... You always was a black queen, mama.

The song's most famous lyric is one in which Shakur declares his love for Afeni, as well as his disappointment in her. Michael Eric Dyson, the author of Holler If You Hear Me: Searching for Tupac Shakur, interprets that this line reflects Shakur's emotional maturity, arguing that he is able to acknowledge his mother's love while recognizing and naming her struggles. Dyson further suggests that Shakur's willingness to present both praise and difficulty reveals the honesty in his portrayal of their relationship. In the song, Shakur addresses the absence of a father figure, stating that he received no love from his father because "the coward wasn't there", adding that he did not cry upon his death, and explaining that his anger prevented him from grieving for someone who he viewed as a stranger. The father mentioned here was Lumumba Shakur, who divorced Afeni after learning Shakur was not his biological son and later died in February 1986. According to Black Fathers: An Invisible Presence in America, this sentiment "seemed to resonate with a generation of Black males who felt estranged from their fathers."

The lyrics also reference Shakur's difficult adolescence, including getting kicked out of his home by his mother at age 17, involvement in drug dealing, and hugging his mother while incarcerated. Scholar George Yancy, writing for The Philadelphia Tribune, argued that the song's slow tempo contributes to a reflective tone, noting that Shakur begins by framing a context in which his mother was taken for granted amid his own disruptive behavior. The song recalls lines such as being "suspended from school" and "scared to go home", followed by reflections on misdirected blame toward his mother, including the admission that "when things went wrong, we blamed mama." These lyrics underscore the regret and self-reflection expressed in the narrative. Emphasizing the song's writing, Yancy described "Dear Mama" as a praise song centered on Black motherhood, arguing that it speaks to how many listeners perceive their own mothers. He notes that the song draws attention to Shakur's personal relationship with his mother, suggests that listening to the song can renew appreciation for one's mother. He further emphasized that the song has a transformative effect, encouraging listeners to reconsider how they see, understand, and value their mothers.

== Release and commercial success ==
“Dear Mama” was first released on February 9, 1995, as the lead single from Me Against the World. The song entered Billboard's Hot R&B Singles chart on March 11, rose to number two the next week, then topped the chart during the week of March 25. It additionally topped the Billboard Hot Rap Singles chart for five weeks and on April 29, peaked at number nine on the Hot 100. “Dear Mama” also topped the Hot Dance Music Maxi-Singles sales chart for four weeks, and peaked at number 16 on the Rhythmic Airplay chart. On the year-end charts, “Dear Mama” ranked at number 27 on the Hot R&B Singles chart and number 51 on the Hot 100. In 2014, “Dear Mama” made a brief appearance on the Ringtones chart.

Internationally, “Dear Mama” made its appearance at number 84 on UK Singles, reaching higher success at number 15 on its Hip-Hop/R&B Singles chart. It also peaked at number four in New Zealand, as well as number 31 and 37 on the Dutch Single Top 100 and Top 40 charts in the Netherlands, respectively. The song would later rank at number 40 on the latter country's year-end charts. Following the 1999 release of “Dear Mama”, the song made appearances in charts from Australia, Belgium, Germany, Sweden, and Switzerland, as well as reappearing on the UK Charts with higher success than its original placement, peaking at number 27. In terms of record certifications, on July 13, 1995, "Dear Mama" was certified Platinum by the Recording Industry Association of America (RIAA), and was later certified 3× Platinum on March 31, 2021. According to the British Phonographic Industry (BPI), the song is certified Gold for selling 400,000 units as of May 24, 2024, and for Recorded Music NZ (RMNZ), it is certified 2× Platinum for selling 60,000 units as of May 2, 2024.

== Music video ==
The music video for "Dear Mama" was directed by Lionel C. Martin, who was approached by Interscope Records to direct a music for Shakur while he was incarcerated. Although Martin had not previously met Shakur, the two discussed the video's concept by telephone, in which Shakur emphasized that the video should prominently feature Afeni and convey a strong message centered on women and motherhood. Afeni provided personal photographs of her son that were incorporated into the final edit. Martin developed a concept focused on depicting Shakur's upbringing, combining dramatized scenes with personal photos. Afeni was present during filming and appeared in the video alongside her sister.

The video features staged sequences portraying Shakur's childhood that were intended to reflect the narrative of "Dear Mama". Actors were cast to portray younger versions of Shakur and his family members, particularly focusing on achieving a naturalistic and autobiographical tone. As Shakur was incarcerated at the time of production, the video incorporates a combination of a lookalike and archival footage to represent him. Footage from the video for "Brenda's Got a Baby" (1991), directed by the Hughes brothers, was integrated into scenes, allowing Shakur's presence without newly filmed material. Upon completion, the video was praised by Shakur, in which he asked Martin to direct "So Many Tears" (1995), followed by "Toss It Up" (1996), with the latter marking their first in-person meeting.

== Critical reception ==
Jeff Weiss, writing for the Los Angeles Times, praised "Dear Mama", stating that it demonstrates Shakur's ability to distill complex emotions into clear and stark imagery. Cheo Coker of Rolling Stone described the song as a heartfelt, at times unflinching dedication to his mother that reflects the mutual hardships they experienced. Robert Christgau included "Dear Mama" the eighth best single of 1995 in his Pazz & Jop critics' poll.

== Legacy ==
The song is often considered Shakur's most "emotionally resonant" song. Rolling Stone placed "Dear Mama" at number eighteen on its 2012 list of The 50 Greatest Hip-Hop Songs of All Time. Carrie Golus of USA Today opined that "Dear Mama" was the sole reason for the double-platinum certifications of Me Against the World. He explained that the song presents a sensitive side of the rapper, which led to increased recognition, particularly among female fans. In 1997, shortly after the rapper's death, Afeni mentioned "Dear Mama" in a People article. She revealed that she could not listen to it without crying, explaining that the emotional impact of the song "gets worse every time".

LA Weekly placed the song at number six on their list The 20 Best Hip-Hop Songs in History. In 2009, "Dear Mama" was one of the twenty-five recordings selected for preservation at the National Recording Registry in the Library of Congress, making it the third hip-hop song to do so after Public Enemy and Grandmaster Flash and The Furious Five. The Library of Congress described the song as a "moving and eloquent homage" not just to Afeni, but also to mothers more broadly who struggle to support their families amid addiction, poverty, and social neglect. Afeni stated she was honored that "Dear Mama" was selected, noting that it resonated with her personally as well as with many other mothers who have faced similar circumstances. She added that Shakur recognized those struggles and remains a hero to many people. In 2017, Shakur's handwritten lyrics for "Dear Mama" were auctioned by the auction site Moments in Time for $75,000.

"Dear Mama" has influenced numerous rappers. In an interview with MTV, Eminem reflected that he frequently played the song in his car shortly after his release. Common described "Dear Mama" as one of Shakur's songs that influenced him the most, calling the song courageous and "one of the most heartfelt songs I've ever heard in hip-hop". He further emphasized that "Dear Mama" demonstrated how a rapper could maintain authenticity while expressing compassion and love. Kendrick Lamar said the song had a profound impact on him, explaining that it helped him understand the importance of vulnerability and expressing oneself without fear.

== Copyright lawsuit ==
On November 21, 2023, co-producer and bus driver Terrence Thomas, known professionally as Master Tee, filed a copyright lawsuit against Interscope, Universal Music Group, and producer Tony Pizarro, alleging that he had not been properly credited or compensated for his contributions to "Dear Mama". The lawsuit cited several pieces of evidence including Shakur's handwritten credits and a 1996 MTV interview in which he stated that he received the beat from Thomas Thomas, who had worked as a bus driver in New York City for 26 years, claimed that he met Shakur in 1993 and recorded an early version of "Dear Mama" with him in October of that year. According to the lawsuit, this version differed from the one released in 1995, although Thomas asserted that the original recording had been widely circulated. He further alleged that the master recording was created at a New York City studio and that Pizarro later made "unilateral changes", such as removing Thomas's producer tag and adding an interpolation of The Spinners’ "Sadie" (1975), in an effort to obscure Thomas's authorship and ownership interests.

Thomas stated that he had long been unaware of the alleged misattribution, claiming he had been "duped by a skillful campaign of deception" by Pizarro. He argued that his recent discovery of the alleged infringement allowed him to bring the claim within the three-year statute of limitations for copyright actions in the U.S., as reported by Music Business Worldwide. The lawsuit described the defendants as "a self-serving group" that had mismanaged his publishing and master recording rights. It also named Hulu, FX Networks, and The Walt Disney Company—distributors of the documentary Dear Mama (2023)—as defendants. Thomas sought damages including unpaid royalties, as well as relief for copyright infringement, unjust enrichment, and misappropriation of intellectual property. In addition, he requested a judicial declaration recognizing him as a co-writer and co-producer, along with an injunction to prevent the defendants from collecting further royalties from the song pending resolution of the dispute.

After the case was paused in mid-April 2024 for settlement discussions, Interscope Records and the other defendants moved to resume proceedings in June, stating that Thomas was not prepared to engage in meaningful negotiations. According to court filings, the defendants alleged that Thomas had demanded substantial payments from each party, including either a $1.6 million lump-sum settlement or, alternatively, $200,000 alongside a 15% writer's royalty and an increased producer royalty share for "Dear Mama" and a doubling of his producer royalty. The defendants also noted that Pizarro had not participated in the settlement conference and may not have been properly served. They requested that the court set a deadline, no sooner than two weeks after ruling on the status of settlement discussions, for filing a motion to dismiss the case.

== Track listing ==
12", cassette, CD, maxi

1. "Dear Mama" (LP Version) — 4:41
2. "Dear Mama" (Instrumental) — 5:21
3. "Bury Me a G" — 4:59
4. "Dear Mama" (Moe Z. Mix) — 5:09
5. "Dear Mama" (Instrumental Moe Z. Mix) — 5:09
6. "Old School" (LP Version) — 4:59

== Credits and personnel ==
Credits are adapted from the single's liner notes.

Locations

- Recorded at Encore Studios, Burbank, California
- Mixed at Enterprise Studios, Burbank, California

Musicians

- Tupac Shakur – vocals, writing
- Tony Pizarro – writing, production, engineering
- DF Master Tee – additional production
- Reggie Green – background vocals
- Moses – additional production
- Sweet Franklin – background vocals

Technical

- Eric Altenburger – design
- Paul Arnold – mixing engineer
- Atron Gregory – management
- Stephen Levy – A&R assistant
- Reisig & Taylor – photography
- Jill Rose – coordinator
- Tyehimba Services – management
- Watani Tyehimba – management
- Tom Whalley – A&R direction

Samples

- Contains a sample from "In My Wildest Dreams", written and performed by Joe Sample
- Contains an interpolation of "Sadie", written by Bruce Hawes, Charles Simmons, and Joseph B. Jefferson, and performed by the Spinners

== Charts ==
=== Weekly charts ===
1995 weekly chart performance for "Dear Mama"
Chart (1995)	Peak position
Netherlands (Dutch Top 40)	37
Netherlands (Single Top 100)	31
New Zealand (Recorded Music NZ)	4
UK Singles (Official Charts)	84
UK Hip Hop/R&B (Official Charts)	15
US Billboard Hot 100	9
US Dance Singles Sales (Billboard)	1
US Hot R&B/Hip-Hop Songs (Billboard)	3
US R&B/Hip-Hop Airplay (Billboard)	7
US Hot Rap Songs (Billboard)	1
US Rhythmic Airplay (Billboard)	16

1999 weekly chart performance for "Dear Mama"
Chart (1999)	Peak position
Australia (ARIA)	37
Belgium (Ultratop 50 Flanders)	4
Germany (GfK)	81
Sweden (Sverigetopplistan)	43
Switzerland (Schweizer Hitparade)	43
UK Singles (Official Charts)	27

2014 weekly chart performance for "Dear Mama"
Chart (2014)	Peak position
US Billboard Ringtones	29

=== Year-end charts ===
Year-end chart performance for "Dear Mama"
Chart (1995)	Peak position
New Zealand (Recorded Music NZ)	40
US Billboard Hot 100	51
US Hot R&B/Hip-Hop Songs (Billboard)	27

== Certifications ==
Region	Certification	Certified units/sales
New Zealand (RMNZ)	2× Platinum	60,000^{‡}
United Kingdom (BPI)	Gold	400,000^{‡}
United States (RIAA)	3× Platinum	3,000,000^{‡}
^{‡} Sales+streaming figures based on certification alone.
