= So Many Tears =

1995 single by 2Pac

Single by 2Pac

from the album Me Against the World
- B-side: If I Die 2Nite; "Hard to Imagine" by Dramacydal
- Released: June 13, 1995
- Recorded: September 22, 1994
- Studio: Soundcastle Studios, Los Angeles
- Genre: Conscious hip-hop -R&B
- Length: 3:58
- Label: Out da Gutta; Interscope; Atlantic
- Songwriter: Tupac Shakur
- Producer: D-Flizno Production Squad

2Pac singles chronology
| "Dear Mama" (1995) | "So Many Tears" (1995) | "Temptations" (1995) |

Music video
- "So Many Tears" on YouTube

"So Many Tears" is a song by American rapper 2Pac from his third studio album, Me Against the World (1995). It was released on June 13, 1995, as the album's second single. It was produced by Shock G, who used samples of Stevie Wonder's "That Girl", and is often described as one of the album's best. A music video was made for "So Many Tears" and there were also numerous live performances of this song on Saturday Night Live and on Shakur's House of Blues concert, his last recorded show.

== Composition ==
The song was produced by Shakur's longtime mentor, Shock G, who produced it using a sample of the song "That Girl" by Stevie Wonder with a slowed down harmonica solo heard during the chorus. The song's lyrics are autobiographical with Rolling Stone's Cheo H. Coker noting the track "finds an almost vulnerable 2Pac not only dealing with the senseless violence that marked his childhood but with the internal demons that threaten to consume him, snapping at his conscience like hellhounds on a bluesman’s trail".

== Live performances ==
Shakur performed "So Many Tears" during his Saturday Night Live appearance on February 17, 1996. He also performed the song on his House of Blues concert and it is included on the Live at the House of Blues live album.

== Music video ==
Similar to the music video for "Dear Mama", many shots use a lookalike of 2Pac, mixed with previously released footage of the artist. Tupac himself was serving his four-and-a-half-year prison sentence. He released this song, and the associated album, while being sentenced. While in prison his album quickly climbed the charts. The demand for a video grew: the video was released while he was in prison and for that reason could not be in the video. No other video was made when he was released. The music video features cameo appearances by Spice 1, E-40, B-Legit, Big Syke and Treach.

== Track listing ==
Maxi-single

1. "So Many Tears"
2. "So Many Tears" (Key of Z Remix)
3. "So Many Tears" (Reminizim' Remix)
4. "Hard to Imagine" by Dramacydal
5. "If I Die 2Nite"

Promo single

1. "So Many Tears"
2. "So Many Tears" (Key of Z Remix)
3. "So Many Tears" (Reminizm' Remix)
4. "If I Die 2Nite"

== Credits ==
- Writers: T. Shakur, G. Jacobs, R. Walker, E. Baker, S. Wonder
- Publishing: Joshua's Dream / Interscope Pearl Music / Warner-Tamerlane Publishing Corp. / Grand Imperial Thug Music / Pubhowyalike Music, BMI / Triboy Music Publishing / Black Bull Music / Jobete Music Co., ASCAP
- Produced by D-Flizno Production Squad for Stayin' Biznizzy Productions
- Engineered by Mike Schlesinger & Tim Nitz
- Recorded and Mixed at Soundcastle Studios
- Background Vocals: Thug Life, Digital Underground (appears courtesy of Tommy Boy Records) & Stretch
- Keyboards: The Piano Man
- Guitar: Eric "Kenya" Baker
- Contains a sample from "That Girl" (Stevie Wonder; Black Bull Music / Jobete Music Co., Inc., ASCAP), as recorded by Stevie Wonder, under license from Motown Records. During the chorus, a slowed-down harmonica solo is heard.

== Charts ==
| Chart (1995) | Peak position |
|---|---|
| US Billboard Hot 100 | 44 |
| US Hot R&B/Hip-Hop Songs (Billboard) | 21 |
| US Hot Rap Songs (Billboard) | 6 |

== Certifications ==
Certifications for "So Many Tears"
| Region | Certification | Certified units/sales |
|---|---|---|
| New Zealand (RMNZ) | Gold | 15,000^{‡} |
^{‡} Sales+streaming figures based on certification alone.
