= Temptations (song) =

Single by 2Pac

from the album Me Against the World
- B-side: "Me Against the World"
- Released: August 29, 1995
- Recorded: October 26, 1993 (remix: June 30, 1994)
- Studio: Unique Studios (New York City)
- Genre: Hip-hop
- Length: 5:00
- Label: Interscope
- Songwriter: Tupac Shakur
- Producer: Easy Mo Bee

2Pac singles chronology
"So Many Tears" (1995)	"Temptations" (1995)	"California Love" (1995)

Music video
- "Temptations" on YouTube

"Temptations" is a song by American rapper Tupac Shakur (2Pac) from his third studio album, Me Against the World (1995). It was released as a single in the US on August 29, 1995, and was released as a CD, cassette, and 12" promo. While rapping is solely performed by Shakur, Erick Sermon and producer Easy Mo Bee are also featured in the song primarily as background vocalists. The song uses the bassline from "Computer Love" by Zapp, and the theme focuses on relationship and infidelity issues. Debuting at number sixty-eight on the Billboard Hot 100, the song did fairly well in the United States. It was also well received by critics, with many writers commenting on its romantic tone.

The song's music video does not have any shots of Shakur, since he was incarcerated at the time. Instead, the video features many celebrities such as Coolio, Ice-T, Isaac Hayes, Warren G, Adina Howard, Salt-N-Pepa, Shock G, B-Real, Treach, Jada Pinkett Smith, Marcus Chong, and Kenya Moore. Taking place in a hotel, the video opens and closes with the concierge (Ice-T) complaining about Coolio (a bellboy). The main plot of the video follows Coolio while he is working in the hotel.

== Writing and composition ==
The idea for "Temptations" began in late 1993 when record producer Easy Mo Bee came to Shakur while he was on the set of Above the Rim (1994). At Rucker Park in New York City, Mo Bee approached Shakur with several different songs they could sample for the Me Against the World album. Out of the pieces he showed the rapper, Shakur favored the Zapp song "Computer Love." Despite being frequently sampled in the past by other artists, Shakur proposed that they simply speed up the tempo of "Computer Love" and use a low frequency automatic filter to retrieve the song's bassline.

"Temptations" (1995)
The bassline is sampled from the Zapp song "Computer Love." After producer Easy Mo Bee added beats and fillers, the song was no longer R&B, and instead, it was hip-hop.

After adding new beats and synth pads/leads, Mo Bee decided to add a sample of the Redman and Erick Sermon song "Watch Yo Nuggets", which contributes to much of the song's tenor section with the repeated line of "Hey." The song's hook samples "Overnight Sensation" by Avalanche, "Sing a Simple Song" by Sly & the Family Stone and the guitar from "In the Rain" by The Dramatics. The song also features Mo Bee and some of his friends singing harmonies.

"Temptations" deals with a male-female relationship, where Shakur is—in Mo Bee's word's—basically saying to his significant other, "I like the time I'm spendin' with [you], but baby, I'm busy." Other than the theme of the relationship issues, the song also focuses on the ability for anyone to feel lonely. The lines "'cause even thugs get lonely, understand. Even the hardest of my homies need attention; catch you blowin' up the telephone, reminiscing." from the third verse, are explained by William Buckholz in his 2011 book, Understand Rap: Explanations of Confusing Rap Lyrics You and Your Grandma Can Understand. He states that despite having a "tough" attitude and exterior, thugs are not emotionless. Buckholz goes on to say that there are times where everyone longs for the company of someone—be a friend or significant other—so they can share feelings and troubles with.

== Music video ==
Despite being the only rapper to perform in the song's musical composition, the music video neglects an appearance by Shakur because of his incarceration for alleged sexual abuse. Set in Hotel Alexandria and directed by David Nelson, the video features celebrity guest appearances by Adina Howard, B-Real, Bill Bellamy, Cheryl James, Coolio, Crystal Waters, DJ Spinderella, Ice-T, Isaac Hayes, Jada Pinkett Smith, Jasmine Guy, Kenya Moore, Shock G, Joe Torry, Taye Diggs, Treach, Warren G, and Yo-Yo.

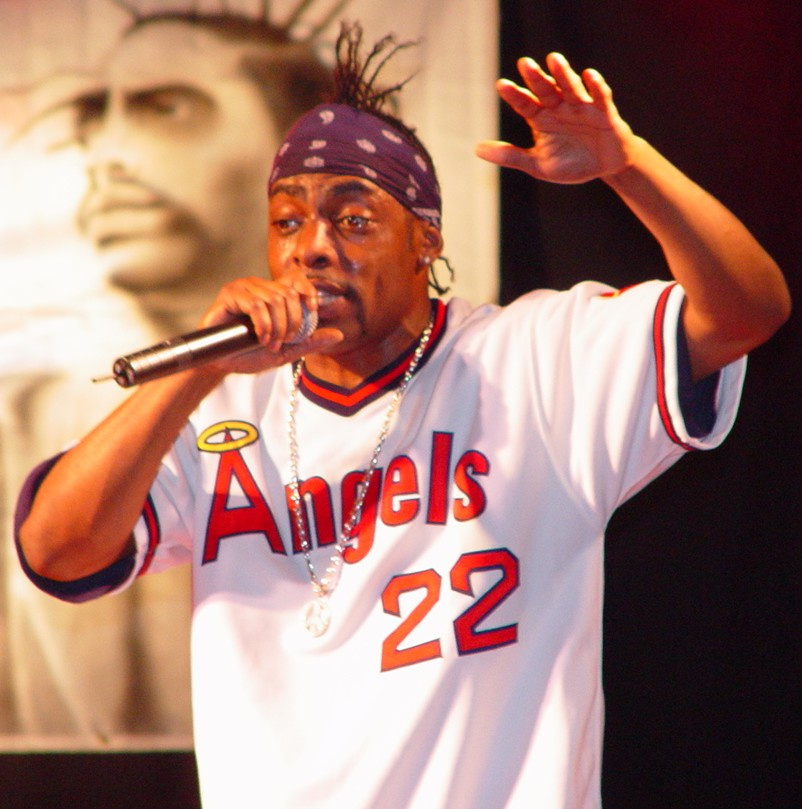
Fellow rapper Coolio took the main role in the "Temptations" music video.

Nelson said the video's production was ambitious, stating: "It's an incredible challenge to make a creative clip of a song without the artist." He goes onto say that Coolio helped enormously because he was the first to commit to his role as the bellboy. Nelson says that Coolio's role "provides the thread that weaves together the entire concept of the video." Yvette Lang, who executive produced the clip for F.M. Rocks, described the filming to be like a "big party" to show their support for Shakur. Ice-T's role as the hotel concierge was not originally intended. At first, there was a comedian set to play his role, but he ended up cancelling at the last minute. Since Ice-T was only available to shoot in the morning, Nelson decided to make him the concierge. The director called it a "strange blessing" since he is more memorable as a concierge, rather than his intended role.

"I shot the clip as if it were a movie, and the preview edit is the equivalent of a film trailer. We both wanted the video to be sexy and erotic, but not sleazy. It definitely pushes the envelope, but then it throws comedy to keep things from getting too serious."

— David Nelson, Billboard

The music video opens with Ice-T, the concierge, and Coolio, the bellboy, in a hotel lobby. Ice-T is getting onto Coolio about how he does not put forth enough effort in his work and does not deserve the job. The song begins to play after this scene ends, and the plot follows Coolio who, while on the job, sees acts of strip poker, lesbian affairs, and several sexual scenarios. The bellboy eventually is invited into one of the rooms and the music comes to an end. The video ends with a scene of Ice-T continuing to complain about the bellboy's work ethics.

=== Controversy ===
The Los Angeles Times inquires that the video deals with acts which lead to Shakur's imprisonment, commenting: "The clip itself practically invites that kind of scrutiny. The hotel setting and explicit sex echo Shakur's own crimes, which involved sodomy occurring in a hotel." Nelson denies these claims, insisting that it is purely coincidental that Shakur was imprisoned for similar occurrences.

== Critical reception ==
Steve Huey at AllMusic described the piece as a romance, and said that it gave a "new meaning as an escape from the hellish pressure of everyday life." Cheo Hodari Coker of Rolling Stone said the song is based on a slow beat and "avoids formulaic, radio-friendly material," and instead focuses on rhymes and confessions from the heart. Jon Pareles of The New York Times wrote that Shakur is describing himself as a "touring rap star" with the song line: "Even though I'm known for my one-night stands, I want to be an honest man." Jordan Spak wrote in the Sun-Sentinel Tribune Company that Tupac is apologizing to his listeners and defining his stance on moral rights and wrongs.

== Chart performance ==
"Temptations" did fairly well on United States charts. It spent six weeks on the Billboard Hot 100, peaking at number sixty-eight. The song debuted at number thirteen on the US Hot Rap Singles, and spent fourteen weeks on the Hot R&B/Hip-Hop Songs, debuting at number thirty-five.

== Charts ==
=== Weekly charts ===
Chart (1995)	Peak position
US Billboard Hot 100	68
US Hot R&B/Hip-Hop Songs (Billboard)	35
US Hot Rap Songs (Billboard)	13

== Formats and track listings ==
CD single

#	Name	Time	Ref
1	"Temptations (Album Version)"	5:00	
2	"Temptations (Battlecat Club Mix)"	4:46	
3	"Temptations (Battlecat Hip Hop Mix)"	5:07	
4	"Temptations (Instrumental)"	4:58	
5	"Me Against The World (Album Version)"	4:39	
6	"Me Against The World (Soul Power Mix)"	4:44	

Cassette single

#	Name	Time	Ref
1	"Temptations" (Album Version)	5:00	

12" LP promo

#	Name	Time	Ref
Side A			
1	"Temptations" (Clean Radio Edit)	4:27	
2	"Temptations" (Album Version)	5:00	
3	"Temptations" (Instrumental)	4:58	
Side B
1	"Temptations" (Battlecat Hip Hop Mix)	5:07	
2	"Temptations" (Battlecat Club Mix)	5:46	
3	"Temptations" (Battlecat Club Mix Instrumental)	5:03	

Cassette promo

#	Name	Time	Ref
Side A			
1	"Temptations" (Clean Radio Edit)	4:27	
2	"Me Against The World" (Radio Edit)	4:07	
Side B
1	"Temptations" (Clean Radio Edit)	4:27	
2	"Me Against The World" (Radio Edit)	4:07	

CD promo

#	Name	Time	Ref
1	"Temptations" (Radio Edit)	4:27	
2	"Temptations" (Clean Battlecat Hip Hop Mix)	5:07	

Cassette Maxi single

#	Name	Time	Ref
Side A			
1	"Temptations" (Album Version)	5:00	
2	"Temptations" (Battlecat Club Mix)	5:46	
3	"Temptations" (Instrumental)	4:58	
Side B
1	"Temptations" (Battlecat Hip Hop Mix)	5:07	
2	"Me Against the World" (Album Version)	4:39	
3	"Me Against the World" (Soul Power Mix)	4:44	
