= Me Against the World =

Studio album by 2Pac
- Released: March 14, 1995
- Recorded: September 1993 – November 1994
- Studios: 12 Trak Studios (Sacramento, California); Echo Sound (Los Angeles, California); Encore Studios (Burbank, California); Enterprise Studios (Burbank, California); Mobboss Studios (Los Angeles, California); Pure Studios (Los Angeles, California); Quad Recording Studios (New York City, New York); Soundcastle (Los Angeles, California); Unique Studios (New York City, New York); Westlake Audio (Los Angeles, California)
- Genres: Conscious rap; G-funk
- Length: 66:00
- Labels: Out da Gutta; Interscope; Atlantic
- Producers: Easy Mo Bee; Johnny "J"; Soulshock & Karlin; Tony Pizarro; D-Flizno Production Squad; Mike Mosley; Shock G; Brian G; Sam Bostic; Moe Z.M.D.

2Pac chronology
Thug Life, Volume I (1994)	Me Against the World (1995)	All Eyez on Me (1996)

Singles from Me Against the World
- 1. "Dear Mama" Released: February 9, 1995; 2. "So Many Tears" Released: June 13, 1995; 3. "Temptations" Released: August 29, 1995

Me Against the World is the third studio album by American rapper 2Pac. It was released on March 14, 1995, by Interscope Records and Out da Gutta Records and distributed by Atlantic Records. 2Pac draws lyrical inspiration from his impending prison sentence, troubles with the police, and poverty.

According to 2Pac, Me Against the World was made to show the hip-hop audience his respect for the art form. Lyrically, he intentionally tried to make the album more personal and reflective than his previous efforts. Considered by several music critics to be the best of any of his albums up to that point in his career, the album's musical production was handled by his mentor Shock G, Easy Mo Bee, Tony Pizarro, Johnny "J" and the Danish hip-hop duo Soulshock and Karlin, among others. Me Against the World features guest appearances from rap group Dramacydal and rapper Richie Rich.

Released while Tupac was imprisoned, Me Against the World made an immediate impact on the charts, debuting at number one on the Billboard 200, holding the top spot for four consecutive weeks, and also topping the Top R&B/Hip-Hop Albums chart. "Dear Mama" was released as the album's first single in February 1995 and would be the album's most successful single, topping the Hot Rap Singles chart, and peaking at number nine on the Billboard Hot 100. While he was in prison, the album overtook Bruce Springsteen's Greatest Hits as the best-selling album of the year in the United States at the time.

Me Against the World was eventually certified double platinum by the Recording Industry Association of America (RIAA). At the 38th Grammy Awards, the album was nominated for Best Rap Album and "Dear Mama" was nominated for Best Rap Solo Performance. The album received acclaim, being ranked among the best albums of the 1990s. It has been ranked by many critics as one of the greatest hip-hop albums, as well as one of the greatest albums of all time. In 2008, the National Association of Recording Merchandisers (NARM), in conjunction with the Rock and Roll Hall of Fame, included Me Against the World in its list of the Definitive 200 Albums of All Time. The album was also included in the book 1001 Albums You Must Hear Before You Die.

== Background ==
By 1994, Tupac Shakur, age 23, was already a prominent and controversial rapper. His second album, Strictly 4 My N.I.G.G.A.Z., received platinum certification by the Recording Industry Association of America (RIAA), entered the top 25 on the Billboard 200, and yielded two Gold-certified top 15 singles: "I Get Around" and "Keep Ya Head Up". In rapid succession, however, he had become involved in a string of violent encounters.

From incidents in 1993, Shakur was sentenced to 15 days in jail for assaulting director Allen Hughes while filming Menace II Society, pled guilty to the attempted assault on a rival rapper and saw the charges dropped after he shot two off-duty police officers. Later that year, Shakur and two associates were charged with gang-raping a female fan in Shakur's hotel room, a charge he vehemently denied. In the ensuing trial, Shakur was acquitted of seven felonies, including rape, sodomy and gun charges, but was convicted of two counts of sexual abuse for unwanted touching and was subsequently sentenced to 18 months to 4.5 years in prison. On November 30, 1994, one day before the jury reached their verdict, Shakur was shot and robbed at gunpoint at the lobby of a New York recording studio. He believed the shooting was set up by East Coast associates and collaborators, such as The Notorious B.I.G., Andre Harrell and Sean "Puffy" Combs.

According to Shakur, Me Against the World aimed to show the hip-hop audience his respect for the art form. Shakur purposefully made Me Against the World's lyrics more personal and reflective than previously. This was widely attributed to Shakur's growing maturity and perhaps an effort to reconcile with his troubled past.

== Theme ==
Me Against the World was really to show people that this is an art to me. That I do take it like that. And whatever mistakes I make, I make out of ignorance, not out of disrespect to music or the art. So Me Against the World was deep, reflective. It was like a blues record. It was down-home. It was all my fears, all the things I just couldn’t sleep about. Everybody thought that I was living so well and doing so good that I wanted to explain it. And it took a whole album to get it all out. It’s explaining my lifestyle, who I am, my upbringing and everything. It talks about the streets but talks about it in a different light. There’s a song on there dedicated to mothers, just a song I wrote just for my mother. And it digs deeper like that. I just wanted to do something for all mothers. I’m proud of that song. It affected a lot of people.

— Tupac Shakur

Often depicting the travails of male survival in the ghetto, prominent sentiments include anguish, despair, hopelessness, paranoia, and self-loathing. Such dark tracks, sometimes simultaneously menacing, are "If I Die 2Nite", "Lord Knows", "Outlaw", and "Fuck The World". But there are exceptions. Nostalgic jubilance distinguishes "Old School"—a roster his favorite rap songs, with associated joys, predating his adulthood—while bittersweet optimism occurs in "It Ain't Easy". "Can U Get Away" aims to flirtatiously encourage and lure a romantic interest away from her current, abusive relationship. And the track most popular, "Dear Mama", is a reverent ode to his mother. Throughout the album, Shakur employs various poetical devices, such as alliteration ("If I Die 2Nite") and paired couplets ("Lord Knows").

== Production ==
Although originally released by Interscope, the album was later released twice by Amaru Entertainment, the label owned by Shakur's mother, Afeni Shakur. The album was recorded at ten different studios, and it was mastered at Bernie Grundman Mastering by Brian Gardner. Several critics found the album's musical production the best on any of Tupac's albums to date.

Steve "Flash" Juon of RapReviews, assigning the album a perfect 10 of 10, particularly praised "So Many Tears" and "Temptations". Jon Pareles of The New York Times called the production a "fatalistic calm, in a commercial mold", and added that "while 2Pac doesn't sing, other voices do, providing smooth melody". Yet James Bernard of Entertainment Weekly, dissenting, complained that Shakur's "vocals are buried deep in the mix. That's a shame—if they were more in-your-face, the lackluster beats might be less noticeable."

Sonically, the album establishes a balanced, cohesive fusion between regional hip-hop aesthetics, organically combining the drum sounds of East Coast hardcore hip-hop like boom bap production with the melodic production elements of West Coast G-funk and bay area hip-hop. The instrumentation relies on clean yet heavy arrangements, featuring slow-rolling, viscous basslines and casual synthesizer hooks that frequently emulate Dr. Dre's signature production style and broader funk traditions. This highly polished and clean overall mix serves as a defining characteristic of West Coast hip-hop production. Rather than allowing a single regional style to dominate, a diverse group of producers heavily shaped the album's distinct, unified sound. Musically, this sonic landscape acts as a direct evolutionary successor to Shakur's previous collaborative album, Thug Life: Volume 1. Smooth vocal melodies frequently layer the tracks, providing a calm contrast to the intense energy of the underlying production.

== Singles ==
"Dear Mama" was released as the album's first single in February 1995, along with the track "Old School" as the B-side. "Dear Mama" would be the album's most successful single, topping the Hot Rap Singles chart, and peaking at No. 9 on the Billboard Hot 100. The single was certified platinum in July 1995, and later placed at No. 51 on the year-end charts.

It was reported that "Can U Get Away" was intended to be released as the next single with a music video directed by Shakur's longtime friend Jada Pinkett. Instead, "So Many Tears" was released as the second single, in June 1995. It reached No. 6 on the Hot Rap Singles chart, and No. 44 on the Billboard Hot 100.

"Temptations," released in August, was the third and final single from the album. The single is the least successful of the three released, but still did fairly well on the charts, reaching No. 68 on the Billboard Hot 100, No. 35 on the Hot R&B/Hip-Hop Singles & Tracks, and No. 13 on the Hot Rap Singles charts.

"Me Against the World", the title track, was released as a single in Europe. It included the Soul Power Remix and the Soul Power Hip Hop Remix. The track appears in the film Bad Boys, which was released into theaters in April 1995.

== Critical reception ==
Professional ratings
Initial reviews (in 1995)
Review scores
Source	Rating
Chicago Sun-Times	4/4 stars
Entertainment Weekly	B−
The Guardian	3/4 stars
Los Angeles Times	3.5/4 stars
Rolling Stone	3.5/5 stars
Select	4/5 stars
Smash Hits	4/5 stars
The Source	4/5 stars
The Village Voice	C+

Professional ratings
Retrospective reviews (after 1995)
Review scores
Source	Rating
AllMusic	5/5 stars
Consequence of Sound	A
The Encyclopedia of Popular Music	4/5 stars
MusicHound R&B	4/5 stars
RapReviews	10/10

Me Against the World received critical acclaim. In a contemporary review, Cheo H. Coker at Rolling Stone called the album Shakur's best and said it was "by and large a work of pain, anger and burning desperation — [it] is the first time 2Pac has taken the conflicting forces tugging at his psyche head-on". Jon Pareles, writing in The New York Times, called Shakur the "St. Augustine of gangster rap" due to his ambivalence towards the behavior and nature of the gangster lifestyle. In his review for The Source, the leading hip-hop magazine in the United States, Allen Gordon hailed Shakur as an elite lyricist on display on the album, called it "his best work by far" and noted that "any complaints critics and fans alike had about Tupac's last two albums can be put to rest". He particularly praised the production and lyricism of the "incredible" title track, "So Many Tears", "Temptations", "Heavy in the Game", "Dear Mama" and "Old School", but also noted "It Ain't Easy", "If I Die 2Nite" and "Young Niggaz" as "notable" tracks.

"This may be the first hip-hop blues LP," observed Matt Hall in Select. "Not so much in the music, although the harp blasts owe more to Howlin' Wolf than Tupac's previous two solo efforts, but more with Shakur's vocals, which are at once rebellious and resigned ... Me Against the World is a statement of intent, a note from the depths of America, and a fine, thoughtful LP." In The Guardian, critic Caroline Sullivan observed a "surprisingly optimistic" and thoughtful 2Pac on display on the album, deeming it "worth a listen" despite criticizing the presence of "anodyne" beats and predictable samples.

Jaleel Abdul-Adil of the Chicago Sun-Times stated that "2Pac's latest also mixes toughness and tenderness. Desperation follows raw anger on "Fuck the World" and "It Ain't Easy," but most tracks confess frailties beneath the rapper's tough exterior. "Dear Mama" is a tear-jerking tribute to his mother, "Lord Knows" discloses desperate considerations of suicide, and "So Many Tears" ponders a merciless world that wrecks young lives. 2Pac even includes a sorrowful "shout-out" to Robert Sandifer, the Chicago youth whose brief life ended in a brutal shooting. After earlier releases that lacked focus and consistency, 2Pac finally presents a polished project of self-examination and social commentary. It's ironic that it arrives as his sentence begins."

Some reviewers were less impressed. James Bernard from Entertainment Weekly said, "2Pac does the black-man-backed-into-a-corner routine better than just about anyone because that's largely who he is. When he says it's 'me against the world,' there's an urgency that only comes from experience. On record, the rapper-turned-movie icon’s vocals are buried deep in the mix. That’s a shame-if they were more in-your-face, the lackluster beats might be less noticeable." Robert Christgau of The Village Voice said Shakur witlessly exploited fundamental hip-hop themes such as persecution while exhibiting an offensive level of self-pity: "His I-love-Mom rings true because Mom was no saint, and his respect for old G's seems genuine, probably because they told him how smart he was. But whether the metaphor be dead homies or suicide threat, the subtext of his persecution complex is his self-regard."

=== Legacy ===
Me Against the World was one of Tupac's most acclaimed albums, with many calling it the magnum opus of his career; the work is considered one of the greatest and most influential hip-hop albums of all time. In a retrospective review, AllMusic editor Steve Huey dubbed the album "[Shakur's] most thematically consistent, least self-contradicting work", and stated, "it may not be his definitive album, but it just might be his best". Steve "Flash" Juon of RapReviews seemed to feel differently, remarking that the album "is not only the quintessential Shakur album, but one of the most important rap albums released in the 1990s as a whole". On MTV's Greatest Rappers of All Time list, Me Against the World was listed as one of Tupac's "certified classic" albums, along with 2Pacalypse Now, All Eyez on Me and The Don Killuminati: The 7 Day Theory. "One of the best five rap albums ever," remarked Mojo, after Shakur's death.

In 1996, at the 38th Grammy Awards, Me Against the World was nominated for Best Rap Album and the single "Dear Mama" was nominated for Best Rap Solo Performance. Me Against the World won Best Rap Album at the 1996 Soul Train Music Awards. In 2008, the National Association of Recording Merchandisers, in conjunction with the Rock and Roll Hall of Fame, recognized Me Against the World as one of the "most influential and popular albums", ranking it number 170 on a list of 200 other albums by artists of various musical genres. The album was also included in the book 1001 Albums You Must Hear Before You Die.

• (*) signifies unordered lists

Publication	Country	Accolade	Year	Rank
New Nation	UK	Top 100 Albums by Black Artists		49
Garry Mulholland	UK	Fear of Music: The 261 Greatest Albums Since Punk and Disco	2006	*
Blender	United States	500 CDs You Must Own Before You Die	2003	*
Ego Trip	United States	Hip Hop's 25 Greatest Albums by Year 1980–1998	1999	7
Nude as the News	United States	The 100 Most Compelling Albums of the 90s	1999	47
Pause & Play	United States	Albums Inducted into a Time Capsule, One Album per Week		*
Robert Dimery	United States	1001 Albums You Must Hear Before You Die	2005	*
The Source	United States	The 100 Best Rap Albums of All Time	1998	*
About.com	United States	100 Greatest Hip Hop Albums		10
About.com	United States	10 Essential Hip-Hop Albums	2008	8
About.com	United States	Best Rap Albums of 1995	2008	2
Complex	United States	The 90 Best Rap Albums of the '90s	2014	23
RollingOut	United States	The 20 Greatest West Coast Hip-hop Albums Of All Time	2013	2

== Commercial performance ==
Me Against the World debuted at number one on the US Billboard 200, selling 240,000 copies in the first week. The album held the top spot for four consecutive weeks. The album also debuted at number one on the US Top R&B/Hip-Hop Albums chart, thus giving 2Pac the first number one album on both R&B and Pop charts. While Shakur was in prison, the album overtook Bruce Springsteen's Greatest Hits as the best-selling album in the United States, a feat which he took pride in. Shakur became the first artist to have a number one album while serving a prison sentence. On April 26, 1995, the album was certified gold and platinum in the United States. On December 6, 1995, the album was certified double platinum for sales of over two million copies in the United States. As of September 2011, the album has sold 3,524,567 copies in the United States.

Shakur's virtual appearance at the annual Coachella Festival (April 15, 2012) led to the album selling 1,000 copies the following week (up by 53% from the previous week).

== Track listing ==
Credits adapted from the album's liner notes.

No.	Title	Writer(s)	Producer(s)	Length
1.	"Intro"	Tupac Shakur	Tony Pizarro; Jill Rose^{[a]}	1:40
2.	"If I Die 2Nite"	Shakur; Betty Wright; Willie Clarke; Norman Durham; Osten Harvey	Easy Mo Bee	4:02
3.	"Me Against the World" (featuring Dramacydal)	Shakur; Minnie Riperton; Richard Rudolph; Leon Ware; Burt Bacharach; Hal David; Malcolm Greenidge; Yafeu Fula; Kenneth Karlin; Carsten Schack	Soulshock and Karlin	4:41
4.	"So Many Tears"	Shakur; Gregory Jacobs; Eric Baker; Stevie Wonder	Shock G; Big Stretch	3:59
5.	"Temptations"	Shakur; Harvey; Roger Troutman; Larry Troutman; Shirley Murdock	Easy Mo Bee	5:01
6.	"Young Niggaz"	Shakur; Nathan Leftenant; Charles Singleton; Thomas Jenkins; Larry Blackmon; Loren Stewart; Le-Morrious Tyler	Moe Z.M.D.; Le-morrious "Funky Drummer" Tyler	4:53
7.	"Heavy in the Game" (featuring Richie Rich)	Shakur; Mike Mosley; Sam Bostic	Mike Mosley; Sam Bostic	4:24
8.	"Lord Knows"	Shakur	Brian G; Moe Z.M.D.^{[b]}; Tony Pizarro^{[b]}	4:32
9.	"Dear Mama"	Shakur; Joe Sample; Tony Pizarro	Tony Pizarro; DF Master Tee & Moses^{[a]}	4:40
10.	"It Ain't Easy"	Shakur; Pizarro	Tony Pizarro	4:54
11.	"Can U Get Away"	Shakur; Mosley; Frankie Beverly	Mike Mosley	5:46
12.	"Old School"	Shakur; John Buchanan; Donald Tilery	Soulshock; Jay-B^{[a]}; Ezi Cut^{[a]}	4:41
13.	"Fuck the World"	Shakur; Jacobs	Shock G	4:14
14.	"Death Around the Corner"	Shakur; Johnny "J"	Johnny "J"	4:07
15.	"Outlaw" (featuring Dramacydal)	Shakur; Moe Z.	Moe Z.M.D.	4:33
Total length:				66:07

Notes

- Additional Vocals on "Lord Knows" performed by Natasha Walker
- Background Vocals on "Fuck the World" performed by Shock G
- Background Vocals on "Me Against the World" performed by Puff Johnson
- Background Vocals on "So Many Tears" performed by Thug Life, Digital Underground & Stretch
- ^{^[a]} signifies a co-producer.
- ^{^[b]} signifies an additional producer.

Sample credits

- "If I Die 2Nite" contains samples from:
  - "Tonight Is the Night", written by Betty Wright and Willie Clarke, as recorded by Betty Wright
  - "Tonight", written by Norman Durham, as recorded by Kleeer
  - "Deep Cover (187)", written by Calvin Broadus, Colin Wolfe, and Dr. Dre, as recorded by Dr. Dre
- "Me Against the World" contains samples from:
  - "Walk On By", written by Burt Bacharach and Hal David, as recorded by Isaac Hayes
  - "Inside My Love", written by Minnie Riperton, Richard Rudolph, and Leon Ware, as recorded by Minnie Riperton
- "So Many Tears" contains a sample from "That Girl", written and recorded by Stevie Wonder
- "Temptations" contains samples from:
  - "Computer Love", written by Roger Troutman, Larry Troutman, and Shirley Murdock, as recorded by Zapp
  - "Watch Your Nuggets", written by Reggie Noble, George Clinton, Garry Shider, and David Spradley, as recorded by Redman & Erick Sermon
- "Young Niggaz" contains an interpolation of "She's Strange", written by Nathan Leftenat, Charles Singleton, Tomi Jenkins, and Larry Blackmon
- "Dear Mama" contains:
  - a sample from "In All My Wildest Dreams", written and recorded by Joe Sample
  - an interpolation of "Sadie", written by Joseph B. Jefferson, Bruce Hawes, and Charles Simmons
- "Can U Get Away" contains an interpolation of "Happy Feelin's", written by Frankie Beverly and performed by Maze
- "Old School" contains samples from:
  - "We Share", written by John Buchanan and Donald Tilery, as recorded by the Soul Searchers
  - "Dedication", written by Maxwell Nixon, as recorded by Brand Nubian

== Personnel ==
- 2Pac - composer, primary artist, vocals
- Eric Altenburger - art direction, design
- Kim Armstrong - vocals (background)
- Paul Arnold - engineer, mixing
- Burt Bacharach - composer
- Eric Baker - composer
- Larry Blackmon - composer
- Sam Bostic - composer, producer
- George Clinton - composer
- Hal David - composer
- Kevin "KD" Davis - engineer, mixing
- Digital Underground - guest artist
- Dramacydal - guest artist, performer, primary artist
- Easy Mo Bee - composer
- Eboni Foster - vocals (background)
- Reggie Green - vocals (background)
- Jeff Griffin - mixing
- Greg Jacobs - composer
- Gregory Jacobs - composer
- Johnny "J" - composer
- Puff Johnson - guest artist, vocals (background)
- Lady Levi - guest artist
- Jay Lean - engineer, mixing
- Eric Lynch - engineer
- Moe Z - composer
- Bob Morris - engineer
- Mike Mosley - composer
- Shirley Murdock - composer
- Tim Nitz - engineer
- Tony "D" Pizarro - composer, engineer, mixing, producer
- Richie Rich - guest artist
- Minnie Riperton - composer, vocals (background)
- Roger - composer
- Jill Rose - vocals
- Richard Rudolph - composer
- Joe Sample - composer
- Garry Shider - composer
- Charlie Singleton - composer
- David Spradley - composer
- Thug Life - guest artist
- Larry Troutman - composer
- Le-Morrious "Funky Drummer" Tyler - composer
- Ronnie Vann - guitar
- Natasha Walker - guest artist, vocals (background)
- Leon Ware - composer
- Brian Gardner - mastering
- Stevie Wonder - composer

== Charts ==
=== Weekly charts ===
Chart (1995)	Peak position
Australian Albums (ARIA)	93
Canada Top Albums/CDs (RPM)	20
German Albums (Offizielle Top 100)	23
Swedish Albums (Sverigetopplistan)	20
UK Albums (Official Charts)	90
US Billboard 200	1
US Top R&B/Hip-Hop Albums (Billboard)	1

Chart (1997)	Peak position
US Catalog Albums (Billboard)	12

=== Year-end charts ===
Chart (1995)	Position
US Billboard 200	34
US Top R&B/Hip-Hop Albums (Billboard)	3
Chart (1996)	Position
US Top R&B/Hip-Hop Albums (Billboard)	65
Chart (2001)	Position
Canadian R&B Albums (Nielsen SoundScan)	158
Chart (2002)	Position
Canadian R&B Albums (Nielsen SoundScan)	168
Canadian Rap Albums (Nielsen SoundScan)	89

== Certifications ==
Region	Certification	Certified units/sales
New Zealand (RMNZ)	Gold	7,500^{‡}
United Kingdom (BPI)	Gold	100,000^{*}
United States (RIAA)	3× Platinum	3,524,567
^{*} Sales figures based on certification alone.^{‡} Sales+streaming figures based on certification alone.

== See also ==
- List of number-one albums of 1995 (U.S.)
- List of number-one R&B albums of 1995 (U.S.)
