= Keep Ya Head Up =

Single by 2Pac

from the album Strictly 4 My N.I.G.G.A.Z...
- B-side: "I Wonder If Heaven Got a Ghetto"; "Rebel of the Underground"
- Released: October 28, 1993
- Recorded: 1992
- Genre: Hip-hop; R&B
- Length: 4:23
- Label: Interscope
- Songwriters: Tupac Shakur; Daryl Anderson; Roger Troutman; Stan Vincent
- Producer: DJ Daryl

2Pac singles chronology
"I Get Around" (1993)	"Keep Ya Head Up" (1993)	"Papa'z Song" (1994)

Audio sample
- "Keep Ya Head Up": file; help

Music video
- "Keep Ya Head Up" on YouTube

"Keep Ya Head Up" is a song by American rapper 2Pac from his second studio album, Strictly 4 My N.I.G.G.A.Z... (1993). It was released on October 28, 1993 by Interscope Records as the album's third single, peaking at numbers 12 and 13 on the US Billboard Hot 100 and Cash Box Top 100.

== Background ==
The song features R&B singer Dave Hollister and is dedicated to Shakur's godson Elijah, and Corin, daughter of Salt from Salt-N-Pepa — the two had met through Treach of Naughty by Nature. The song focuses on black womanhood. Additionally, it makes reference to Latasha Harlins, who was shot by a Korean shopkeeper in 1991, increasing tensions between the Black and Korean communities of Los Angeles before the 1992 Los Angeles riots; The music video for the song opens up with the words "Dedicated to the memory of Latasha Harlins, it's still on."

== Production and release ==
The beat is sampled from Zapp's "Be Alright" and the chorus is taken from The Five Stairsteps' "O-o-h Child". It was first released in Shakur's 1993 album Strictly 4 My N.I.G.G.A.Z. later appearing after his death in 1998 in his Greatest Hits compilation. A "sequel" to the song, "Baby Don't Cry (Keep Ya Head Up II)" was released on 2Pac's posthumous album Still I Rise in 1999. The song was featured in the Tupac biopic All Eyez on Me.

== Music video ==
The music video for "Keep Ya Head Up" has a basic format with Shakur rapping in the middle of a circle surrounded by a crowd of people and in some scenes he is seen holding a young child. His mother Afeni Shakur and close friend Jada Pinkett Smith made cameo appearances in the video.

== Critical reception ==
Publication	Country	Accolade	Year	Rank
Bruce Pollock	United States	The 7,500 Most Important Songs of 1944–2000	2005	*
Rock and Roll Hall of Fame	United States	The Songs That Shaped Rock	2011	*

Alyssa Rosenberg of Brisbane Times felt the song "weaved together a critique of negligent fathers, an argument for abortion rights and a sharp analysis of misogyny."

== Track listing ==
- CDS – maxi single
1. "Keep Ya Head Up" (LP version)
2. "Keep Ya Head Up" (Vibe Tribe remix)
3. "Keep Ya Head Up" (Madukey remix)
4. "Rebel of the Underground"
5. "I Wonda If Heaven's Got a Ghetto"
- 7" vinyl
1. "Keep Ya Head Up"
2. "Keep Ya Head Up" (instrumental)

== Charts ==
=== Weekly charts ===
Chart (1993–1994)	Peak position
US Billboard Hot 100	12
US Hot R&B/Hip-Hop Songs (Billboard)	7
US Hot Rap Songs (Billboard)	2
US Maxi-Singles Sales (Billboard)	2
US Cash Box Top 100	13

=== Year-end charts ===
Chart (1994)	Position
US Billboard Hot 100	61
US Hot R&B/Hip-Hop Songs (Billboard)	53

== Certifications ==
Region	Certification	Certified units/sales
New Zealand (RMNZ)	2× Platinum	60,000^{‡}
United Kingdom (BPI)	Silver	200,000^{‡}
United States (RIAA)	Platinum	1,000,000^{‡}
^{‡} Sales+streaming figures based on certification alone.

== Credits ==
- Engineer – Bob Tucker (tracks: A2, B2), Norman "Slam" Whitfield, Jr.* (tracks: A2, B2)
- Engineer [Remix] – Eric Flickinger (tracks: B1), Franklin Purrell (tracks: B1)
- Mixed By – D. Nettlesbey* (tracks: A2), Norman "Slam" Whitfield, Jr.* (tracks: A2)
- Producer – D-Flow Production Squad, The* (tracks: B2), D.J. Daryl* (tracks: A1, B1)
- Remix [Additional] – Norman "Slam" Whitfield, Jr.* (tracks: B2)

Remix,

- Producer [Additional Production] – Bryant "Moe Doe" Johnson* (tracks: B1), Battlecat* (tracks: B2), Howard Johnson (2) (tracks: B2), Kris Kellow* (tracks: B2), Lea Reis (tracks: B1), Paul Arnold (tracks: B2), Vibe Tribe (10) (tracks: A2)
- Vocals – Black Angel, The (tracks: A1, B1), Money B (2) (tracks: B2), Shockalock (tracks: B2)
