= Soulshock and Karlin =

Danish songwriting/production duo

Soulshock & Karlin
- Origin: Denmark
- Genres: Pop; hip hop; R&B
- Years active: 1989–present
- Label: Soulpower Productions
- Members: Carsten Schack; Kenneth Karlin
- Website: www.soulpower.net

Soulshock & Karlin is a Danish songwriting/production duo, consisting of Carsten Schack and Kenneth Karlin. They have produced many successful songs, including 2Pac's "Do for Love", Monica's "Before You Walk Out of My Life", Whitney Houston's "Heartbreak Hotel", JoJo's "Leave (Get Out)", and Toni Braxton's "I Love Me Some Him". In a reference to a famous commercial, in March 2001 Arena Magazine called the team "probably the best R&B producers in the world".

Soulshock & Karlin have written and produced hits for many artists such as Brandy, Usher, Monica, Whitney Houston, Luther Vandross, Craig David and Sting in "Rise & Fall", and again 2Pac in "Me Against the World", "I Wonder If Heaven Got a Ghetto", "Old School", and "Baby Don't Cry (Keep Ya Head Up II)". Their remix credits include Usher's "U Got It Bad", and "Brokenhearted" by Brandy featuring Wanya Morris of Boyz II Men.

The duo took a break from working together in 2010 when Soulshock was asked to become a judge on the Danish version of The X Factor before becoming the in-house producer for the U.S. incarnation of the show. Since reuniting in early 2016, the duo has released new songs and productions with several major label artists including K. Michelle, Marko Penn feat Gucci Mane, Carter Park feat G-Eazy, H.I.M, Luke Christopher, Solo Lucci and several others.

== Biography ==
Soulshock began his career as a hip-hop club DJ, spinning records in his bedroom. His big break came in 1989 when he took third place in the DMC Mixing Championships in London. The contest victory led to a DJ position on the European Tour for Queen Latifah, Jungle Brothers and Chill Rob G. That gig, in turn, gave Soulshock the opportunity to remix songs for Mc Lyte, Queen Latifah among others. With his remixes playing on KIIS-FM, Soulshock came out to New York City to study under DJ Red Alert. But as Soulshock recalls, "I went back to Denmark, because it was so tough being in New York and I was making no money at all." EMI/Medley had offered Soulshock and his former partner, Cutfather, a label deal in Denmark. In 1990, he opened Soulpower Productions and Records. Moving toward more of an R&B vibe, Soulshock needed a great keyboard player, and found one in Karlin.

A fan of jazz greats such as Bob James and Stanley Clarke, Karlin was an integral part of Denmark's jazz scene before joining with Soulshock producing Patti LaBelle's "All Right Now". A musician in the traditional sense of the word, Karlin says, "I think our different backgrounds are what make our tracks interesting." While the future overseas looked bright, Soulshock & Karlin felt that the brand of R&B/hip-hop they specialized in was being overshadowed in Europe by dance and house music. The duo made the move to Los Angeles and, after months of struggling, finally had a break through with CeCe Peniston. Their single "I'm in the Mood" came out and attracted some attention. Following this, Soulshock & Karlin scored their first big hit with Monica's number-one R&B single "Before You Walk Out of My Life", which they wrote and produced. Hits with artists such as Toni Braxton, Brandy, Brownstone, Silk, and 2Pac followed.

In 1999, Soulshock & Karlin enjoyed another number-one single with Whitney Houston's "Heartbreak Hotel", which received two Grammy nominations: Best R&B Song, and Best R&B Performance by a Duo or Vocalist. Soulshock & Karlin produced the tracks "Rise and Fall" by Craig David and Sting; Blu Cantrell's "Don't Wanna Say Goodbye", Monica's "Breaks My Heart", "I Wrote This Song", and "What Hurts the Most", and the first single from American Pop Idol contestant Justin Guarini, "Sorry".

Soulshock & Karlin produced and wrote their first number-one hit "Leave (Get Out)" performed by JoJo, and the number-one R&B song "Truth Is" performed by American Idol winner Fantasia (which also received a Grammy nomination for Best R&B Album) and tracks for rapper Nelly. Soulshock and Karlin went on to collaborate with Keyshia Cole, Kelly Rowland, and Samantha Jade and to produce songs for the debut solo albums of Cheryl Cole and 2008 The X Factor winner Alexandra Burke, 3 Words and Overcome respectively.

== Singles discography ==
Year	Single	Artist	Peak chart position		
Year	Single	Artist	US R&B	US 100	UK
1991	"Wanna Dance!" *	Yasmin	—	—	—
1991	"Love Rears Its Ugly Head" (Remix) *	Living Colour	—	—	12
1992	"Fly Girl" *	Queen Latifah	16	—	67
1992	"Casualties of War" (Remix) *	Eric B. & Rakim	—	—	—
1992	"All Right Now"	Patti LaBelle	30	—	—
1992	"All Day All Night" (Remix)	Stephanie Mills	20	—	—
1993	"Demolition Man" (Remix)	Sting	—	—	21
1993	"For What It's Worth" (Remix)	Oui 3	—	—	23
1993	"Show Me"	Ultra Naté	—	—	67
1994	"I'm In the Mood"	CeCe Peniston	7	32	16
1994	"Hit By Love"	CeCe Peniston	47	90	33
1994	"I Belong to You" (Remix)	Toni Braxton	—	—	—
1995	"Before You Walk out of My Life"	Monica	1	7	22
1995	"Me Against the World"	2Pac	—	—	—
1995	"Brokenhearted" (Soul Power Groove Mix)	Brandy (feat. Wanya Morris)	2	9	—
1995	"Hooked On You"	Silk	12	54	—
1995	"Come On" (Remix)	Barry White	12	87	—
1996	"Got to Be Real"	Jordan Hill	—	—	—
1996	"Love Don't Live Here Anymore" (Remix)	Madonna	—	78	—
1997	"I Wonder If Heaven Got a Ghetto"	2Pac	14	67	21
1997	"I Love Me Some Him"	Toni Braxton	9	19	—
1997	"Too Much" (Remix)	Spice Girls	—	9	1
1998	"Heartbreak Hotel"	Whitney Houston (feat. Faith Evans and Kelly Price)	1	2	25
1998	Summertime '98 (Remix)	DJ Jazzy Jeff & The Fresh Prince	—	—	—
1998	"Do for Love"	2Pac	10	21	12
1999	"You Don't Know"	702	50	—	—
1999	"It's All About You (Not About Me)"	Tracie Spencer	6	18	65
1999	"Still In My Heart"	Tracie Spencer	36	88	—
1999	"Give You What You Want"	Chico DeBarge	1	71	—
2000	"Baby Don't Cry (Keep Ya Head Up II)"	2Pac	36	72	—
2000	"Tell Me How You Feel"	Joy Enriquez	—	—	—
2000	"My Getaway"	T-Boz	79	—	44
2000	"I Can't Do that"	Stephen Simmonds	—	—	—
2001	"Shining Through"	Fredro Starr (feat. Jill Scott)	—	—	—
2001	"U Got It Bad" (Soulpower Remix)	Usher	1	1	5
2001	"Can Heaven Wait"	Luther Vandross	63	—	—
2003	"Rise & Fall"	Craig David (feat. Sting)	—	—	2
2003	"I Give, You Take"	Maria	—	—	—
2003	"Sorry"	Justin Guarini	—	—	—
2004	"Truth Is"	Fantasia	2	21	—
2004	"Leave (Get Out)"	JoJo	—	12	2
2004	"Thank You" *	Jamelia	—	—	2
2004	"DJ"	Jamelia	—	—	9
2004	"Walk On By"	Seal	—	—	—
2005	"Backwards Again"	Tammin	—	—	—
2005	"Beautiful Goodbye"	Kasey Butler	—	—	—
2005	"Whatever"	Brie Larson	—	—	—
2006	"Where Did You Go"	Ashley Parker Angel	—	—	—
2006	"So Done"	Jeannie Ortega	—	—	—
2006	"Coming for You"	JoJo	—	—	—
2006	"Something About You" *	Jamelia	—	—	9
2007	"Turn Around"	Samantha Jade	—	—	—
2007	"Forget You"	L.A.X. Gurlz	—	—	—
2008	"Sandcastle Disco"	Solange	—	—	—
2008	"If She Knew"	Lemar	—	—	14
2009	"I Love the DJ"	R. Kelly	—	—	—
2009	"Breathe Slow"	Alesha Dixon	—	—	3
2010	"One Shot"	JLS	—	—	6
2010	"If I Knew Then"	Backstreet Boys	—	—	—
2016	"Ain't She"	H.I.M	—	—	—
"—" denotes releases that did not chart "*" denotes Soulshock only.
