= Tony Pizarro =

American record producer

Anthony D. Pizarro is an American record producer. Listed as one of the "Top 50 Hip Hop Producers of All Time" by About.com, he was credited on Tupac Shakur's 1995 single "Dear Mama", which has been inducted into the National Recording Registry by the Library of Congress. As one of Shakur's primary producers, Pizarro has contributed to sales of over 75 million units.

After Shakur's death, Pizarro re-emerged as an executive for Def Jam Recordings, and effectively promoted other hip hop acts including DMX, Scarface, M.O.P., WC, and Keith Murray. As a recording engineer, he has been credited on albums for artists such as Ice-T, Teena Marie, and Tevin Campbell.
