= Amaru Entertainment =

American record label

- Parent company: Universal Music Group
- Founded: 1997
- Founder: Afeni Shakur
- Distributor: Interscope
- Genre: Hip hop
- Country of origin: United States of America
- Location: Marin City, California

Amaru Entertainment (formerly Amaru Records) was a record label founded in 1997 by Afeni Shakur after the death of her son Tupac Amaru Shakur. The label was created to handle the release of Tupac's previously unreleased material, and was given the rights to release recordings made during his time at both Interscope and Death Row Records, as well as the rights to re-release his Interscope albums 2Pacalypse Now, Strictly 4 My N.I.G.G.A.Z..., Thug Life, Volume I, and Me Against the World. The label initially distributed its releases through Jive Records, beginning with R U Still Down? (Remember Me), but, as of 2011, the releases were being distributed by Interscope. Amaru has released 11 posthumous albums by 2Pac, as well as a documentary, titled Tupac: Resurrection.

On May 2, 2016, Afeni Shakur died of a heart attack. Since Afeni's passing, Amaru Entertainment has been managed by Tom Whalley, the music executive who signed Tupac to Interscope Records. Sekyiwa "Set" Shakur, Tupac's younger half-sister and president of the Tupac Amaru Shakur Foundation, has been in an ongoing litigation with Tom Whalley over control of Amaru Entertainment and Tupac's estate.

== Controversy ==
=== Lee Ha-neul "Miari Vox" remarks and the legal dispute ===
While promoting their song "Xcstasy", Lee Ha-neul, a member of the fellow Korean hip-hop group DJ DOC, appeared as a guest on the cable TV channel Mnet "Hip Hop the Vibe" segment and publicly criticized South Korean girl group Baby Vox, accusing them of commercially exploiting a deceased person. In response, American rapper, Floss P countered Lee remarks, stating, "I appreciate the criticism. We did our best with Baby Vox's music, but it seems we fell short of Mr. Ha-neul musicality." However, I also believe DJ DOC's rapping merely borrowed American rap styles. It appears to lack a distinct identity. It does not seem proper for a public figure to criticize others by claiming "it is not someone else's work while utilizing their own work." Upon seeing these remarks, Lee Ha-neul subsequently posted a lengthy message on his website slandering Baby Vox and Floss P. In the process, he caused a major controversy by using the sexually derogatory term "Miari Vox," inflicting significant damage on Baby Vox's image. In response, Baby Vox side took a hardline stance, sending an ultimatum to Lee Ha-neul to apologize by June 19. Lee Ha-neul held an official press conference and apologized, stating that his choice of the word "Miari Vox" was a blunt expression even in his own opinion. However, regarding Baby Vox agency, he said, "Think about which is greater: the defamation you suffered or the honor of Shakur you tarnished," adding, "I think the latter is greater." Consequently, Yoon Deung-ryong, CEO of DR Music, filed a criminal lawsuit against Lee Ha-neul. Fellow entertainer Kim Jin-pyo posted on his website pointing out that the incident stemmed from Baby Vox including a rap by American rapper Tupac Shakur in their recent album, stating, "Anyway, I have a feeling Tupac will be laughing a little because of this." Many fans of hip-hop artists also directed meaningful criticism at Baby Vox. Regarding this incident, a music industry insider, Mr. Kang, stated, "Hip-hop musicians attacking idol stars is a common form of "diss" in the American hip-hop scene," adding, "While it feels like Lee Ha-neul is imitating Eminem, the repercussions are expected to be significant given that he indiscriminately attacked a specific celebrity."

=== Tupac Records copyright lawsuit ===
Amaru Records, founded by Shakur's mother, announced that they would sue Baby Vox and their agency to stop the use of Shakur's music and trademarks without a license agreement. In response, Baby Vox appealed against the accusation, stating that "the sampling of Shakur's music was done legally after receiving an offer from a company at Bungaroo Music, the mecca of American hip-hop." They further explained that Amaru does not hold all of Shakur copyrights, so there is no legal issue, and that Shakur's copyrights are shared by several labels including Tupac State and Interscope, in addition to Amaru. They also revealed that they released their last album after purchasing the rights to use music, portraits, and video for the Asian region from Death Row and DTTG last November. Ultimately, the incident was concluded as a mere misunderstanding after it was confirmed that they had legally purchased the music.

== See also ==
- Lists of record labels
