= Johnny Winter discography =

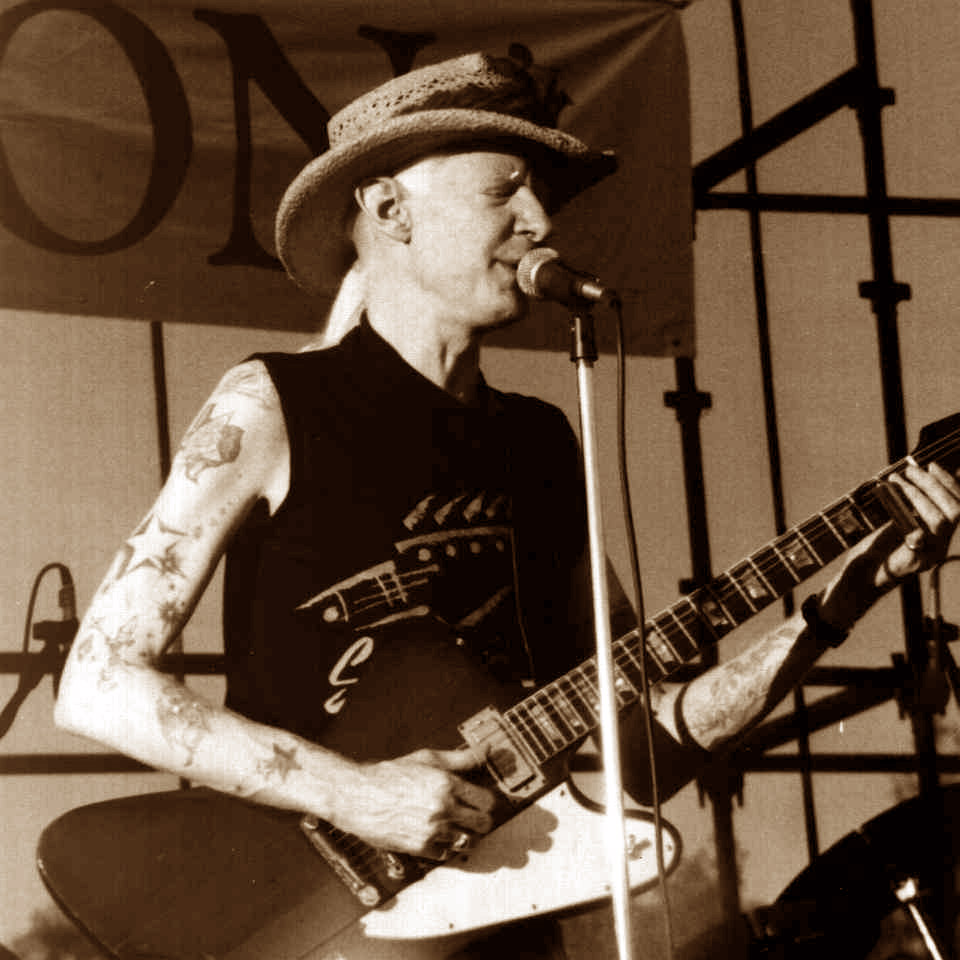
- In concert 1990
- Studio albums: 19
- Live albums: 9
- Live Bootleg Series: 15
- Compilation: 15
- Singles: 25
- Albums as producer and/or guitarist: 9
- Concert videos: 2
- Documentary films: 1

Johnny Winter (1944–2014) was an American rock and blues musician. From 1959 to 1967, he recorded several singles for mostly small record companies in his native Texas. In 1968, Winter completed his first album, The Progressive Blues Experiment, and in 1969, he was signed to Columbia Records. With the label, Winter had his greatest success on the American record chart; Johnny Winter (1969), Second Winter (1969), Live Johnny Winter And (1971), and Still Alive and Well (1973) all reached the top forty on the Billboard 200 album chart. In 1974, the Recording Industry Association of America (RIAA) certified Live Johnny Winter And gold, his only record to receive an award from the organization.

Beginning in 1973, Winter's music was issued by Blue Sky Records, a Columbia custom label. At Blue Sky, Winter also became a producer and was responsible for releases by Chicago blues pioneer Muddy Waters. He produced Hard Again (1977), which earned Waters a Grammy Award and helped re-establish his popularity. In the years after 1984, Winter changed record companies several times, never remaining with any one for more than three albums. These included Alligator Records, MCA Records' Voyager subsidiary, Pointblank Records, Virgin Records, and Megaforce Records. In 2007, he began producing a number of albums from his personal recordings, designated the "Live Bootleg Series". Winter's last studio album, Step Back, released shortly after his death in 2014, was his most successful in the record charts since his Columbia period. Several live albums and compilations have appeared on Billboard's "Blues Albums" specialty chart.

Throughout his career, Winter's recording catalogue was plagued by bootleg albums and unauthorized re-releases of singles from his early pre-Columbia Records days. These records competed with his official releases and some were doctored with later overdubs by other musicians. Royalties were not Winter's primary concern: "I just don't want that bullshit out ... It's just bad music."

== Albums ==
=== Studio albums ===
List of studio albums with year, title, details, chart peak, and reference(s)
Year	Title	Details	Chart peak Billboard 200	Ref(s)
1968	The Progressive Blues Experiment	Released: Fall 1968; Label: Sonobeat (R-S1002); Format: LP record, reel-to-reel audio tape, 8-track audio cartridge; Note: Reissued with new album cover by Imperial in March 1969	40	
1969	Johnny Winter	Released: April 15, 1969; Label: Columbia (CS 9826); Format: LP, 8-track, reel-to-reel, audio cassette	24 (Note: On the RPM charts in Canada, Johnny Winter reached No. 23; Second Winter No. 60; Still Alive and Well No. 7; Saints & Sinners No. 40;John Dawson Winter III No. 77; Guitar Slinger No. 73; Johnny Winter And Live No. 48; "Rock and Roll, Hoochie Koo" No. 79; and "Boney Moroney" No. 97.)	
1969	Second Winter	Released: November 1969; Label: Columbia (KCS 9947); Format: Double LP; Note: Only 3 sides used (4th is blank)	55 (Note: On the UK Albums chart, Second Winter reached No. 59; Johnny Winter And No. 29; Step Back No. 41; and Johnny Winter And Live No. 20.)	
1970	Johnny Winter And	Released: September 1970; Label: Columbia (C 30221); Format: LP, 8-track	154	
1973	Still Alive and Well	Released: March 1973; Label: Columbia (KC 32188); Format: LP, 8-track, cassette	22 (Note: On the Australian album chart, Still Alive and Well reached No. 48; and Saints & Sinners No. 78.)	
1974	Saints & Sinners	Released: February 1974; Label: Columbia (PC 32715); Format: LP, 8-track, cassette	42	
1974	John Dawson Winter III	Released: November 1974; Label: Blue Sky (PZ 33292); Format: LP, 8-track, cassette	78	
1977	Nothin' but the Blues	Released: July 1977; Label: Blue Sky (PZ 34813); Format: LP, 8-track, cassette	146	
1978	White, Hot and Blue	Released: July 1978; Label: Blue Sky (JZ 35475); Format: LP, cassette	141	
1980	Raisin' Cain	Released: March 1980; Label: Blue Sky (JZ 36343); Format: LP, cassette	—	
1984	Guitar Slinger	Released: May 1984; Label: Alligator (AL 4735); Format: LP, compact audio disc (CD), cassette	183	
1985	Serious Business	Released: September 1985; Label: Alligator (AL 4742); Format: LP, CD, cassette	156	
1986	Third Degree	Released: November 1986; Label: Alligator (AL 4748); Format: LP, CD, cassette	—	
1988	The Winter of '88	Released: October 1988; Label: Voyager/MCA (MCA-42241); Format: LP, CD, cassette	—	
1991	Let Me In	Released: July 1, 1991; Label: Pointblank/Virgin/Atlantic (91744-2); Format: LP, CD	—	
1992	Hey, Where's Your Brother?	Released: November 2, 1992; Label: Pointblank/Virgin/EMI (V2-86512); Format: CD	—	
2004	I'm a Bluesman	Released: June 15, 2004; Label: Virgin America (72435 90081 27); Format: CD	— (Note: On Billboard's Blues Albums chart, I'm a Bluesman reached No. 7; Live in NYC '97 No. 7; The Woodstock Experience No. 1; Live at the Fillmore East 10/3/70 No. 1; The King of Slide No. 6; The Best of Johnny Winter No. 11; The Johnny Winter Anthology No. 11; True to the Blues: The Johnny Winter Story No. 2; Remembrance Vol. 1 No. 8; and Breakin' It Up, Breakin' It Down No. 3.)	
2011	Roots	Released: September 2011; Label: Megaforce (20286 16038); Format: LP, CD	163	
2014	Step Back	Released: August 2014; Label: Megaforce (20286 21696); Format: LP, CD	17	
"—" denotes a release that did not chart

=== Live albums ===
List of live albums with year, title, details, chart peak, and reference(s)
Year	Title	Details	Chart peak Billboard 200	Ref(s)
1971	Live Johnny Winter And	Recorded: Late 1970; Venue: Fillmore East, New York City; Pirates World, Dania Beach, Florida; Released: March 1971; Label: Columbia (C 30475); Format: LP record, 8-track audio cartridge; Note: Certified gold by RIAA in 1974	40	
1976	Captured Live!	Recorded: September 1975; Venue: Swing Auditorium, San Bernardino; San Diego Sports Arena; Oakland Coliseum (all in California).; Released: March 1976; Label: Blue Sky (PZ 33944); Format: LP, 8-track, audio cassette	93	
1976	Together	Venue: Swing Auditorium, San Bernardino, California; San Diego Sports Arena, California; Released: June 1976; Label: Blue Sky (PZ 34033); Format: LP, 8-track, cassette; Note: Listed as "Johnny and Edgar Winter"	86	
1998	Live in NYC '97	Recorded: March 10, 1997; Venue: The Bottom Line, New York City; Released: March 1998; Label: Pointblank/Virgin/EMI (45527); Format: Compact audio disc (CD)	—	
2009	The Woodstock Experience	Recorded: August 17, 1969; Venue: Woodstock Music & Art Fair, Bethel, New York; Released: 2009; Label: Columbia/Legacy (88697 48244 2); Format: Double CD; Note: CD2 contains Winter's live Woodstock performance; CD1 is his 1969 Columbia debut album.	—	
2010	Live at the Fillmore East 10/3/70	Recorded: October 3, 1970; Venue: Fillmore East, New York City; Released: 2010; Label: Collectors' Choice Live (6000); Format: CD	—	
2011	Rockpalast: Blues Rock Legends Vol. 3	Recorded: April 21, 1979; Venue: Grugahalle, Essen, Germany; Released: 2011; Label: MIG (90362 CD); Format: Double CD; Note: 6 tracks were released on a single LP, titled Live at Rockpalast (MVD Audio, 2011).	—	
2015	Live from Japan	Recorded: April 15, 2011; Venue: Zepp, Tokyo; Released: April 2015; Label: MVD Audio (6664A); Format: CD, double LP	—	
2018	The King of Slide	Released: April 21, 2018; Label: Friday Music (FRM 42018); Format: LP; Note: Limited edition (1,000) for Record Store Day in 2018	—	
"—" denotes a release that did not chart

=== Live Bootleg Series albums ===
The "Live Bootleg Series" are authorized, official releases produced by Winter for the Friday Music label. The CDs and LPs include the notice: "All master recordings are owned and controlled by Johnny Winter and are compiled from the authorized Johnny Winter archives". The recordings were not state-of-the-art for the time and many similar recordings had previously circulated as actual bootleg albums. The peak chart positions refer to Billboard's "Blues Albums" chart (none appeared on the broader Billboard 200 album chart).

List of "Live Bootleg Series" albums with year, title, details, chart peak, and reference(s)
Year	Title	Details Catalogue no. & number of tracks	Chart peak Blues Albums	Ref(s)
2007	Live Bootleg Series Vol. 1	FRM 1064 – 12 tracks	15	
2008	Live Bootleg Series Vol. 2	FRM 1083 – 6 tracks	7	
2008	Live Bootleg Series Vol. 3	FRM 1085 – 7 tracks	—	
2009	Live Bootleg Series Vol. 4	FRM 1100 – 10 tracks	9	
2009	Live Bootleg Series Vol. 5	FRM 1143 – 8 tracks	8	
2010	Live Bootleg Series Vol. 6	FRM 1156 – 7 tracks	5	
2011	Live Bootleg Series Vol. 7	FRM 1160 – 7 tracks	15	
2012	Live Bootleg Series Vol. 8	FRM 1162 – 7 tracks	—	
2013	Live Bootleg Series Vol. 9	FRM 1163 – 7 tracks	—	
2013	Live Bootleg Series Vol. 10	FRM 1164 – 7 tracks	—	
2014	Live Bootleg Special Edition	FRM 41914 (LP only) – 6 tracks	9	
2014	Live Bootleg Series Vol. 11	FRM 1165 – 7 tracks	15	
2016	Live Bootleg Series Vol. 12	FRM 1167 – 7 tracks	10	
2016	Live Bootleg Series Vol. 13	FRM 1169 – 7 tracks	—	
2018	Live Bootleg Series Vol. 14: It's Johnny's Birthday	FRM 22344 – 9 tracks	—	
"—" denotes a release that did not chart

=== Compilation albums ===
After Winter signed to Columbia Records in 1969, his former associates began licensing albums consisting of Winter's early singles and demos for various labels. These 40 or so songs continue to be re-packaged and re-released by numerous small record companies. In several interviews, Winter asserts that these were unauthorized and that some have been overdubbed with other musicians. For completeness, two of the more noteworthy compilations of pre-1968 recordings are included. The rest of those listed below contain songs that were recorded from 1968 on.

List of compilation albums with year, title, details, chart peak, and reference(s)
Year	Title	Details	Chart peak Billboard 200	Ref(s)
1969	The Johnny Winter Story	Recorded: c. 1961–1964 for various single labels; Released: August 1969; Label: GRT (GRT-10010); Format: LP record, 8-track audio cartridge; Note: Repackaged with different titles & cover art by many labels	111	
1992	Scorchin' Blues	Recorded: 1968–1978 for Columbia & Blue Sky; Label: Legacy (ZK 52466); Format: Compact audio disc (CD), audio cassette	—	
1994	A Rock n' Roll Collection	Recorded: 1969–1979 for Columbia & Blue Sky; Label: Legacy (C2K 46985); Format: 2-CD	—	
1996	The Return of Johnny Guitar (The Best of Johnny Winter 1984–86)	Recorded: 1984–1986 for Alligator; Label: Music Club (MCCD 270); Format: CD	—	
1997	White Hot Blues	Recorded: 1969–1980 for Columbia & Blue Sky; Label: Legacy (CK 65213); Format: CD	—	
2001	Deluxe Edition	Recorded: 1984–1986 for Alligator; Label: Alligator; Format: CD	—	
2002	The Best of Johnny Winter	Recorded: 1969–1979 for Columbia & Blue Sky; Label: Legacy (CK 85926); Format: CD	—	
2003	Winter Essentials 1960–1967	Recorded: Prior to 1968 for various single labels; Label: Fuel 2000 (302 061 309 2); Format: 2-CD; Note: Contains nearly all of Winter's pre-1968 singles, plus additional demos from the same period; re-released as Beginnings: 1960–1967 (2010)	—	
2009	The Johnny Winter Anthology	Recorded: 1968–1997 for various labels; Label: Shout! Factory (82663-11328); Format: 2-CD	—	
2011	Playlist: The Very Best of Johnny Winter Live	Recorded: 1969–1977 for Columbia & Blue Sky; Label: Legacy (88697 86946 2); Format: CD; Note: Released in Europe with some different tracks as Setlist: The Very Best of Johnny Winter (2011, Legacy)	—	
2014	The Essential Johnny Winter	Recorded: 1969–1980 for Columbia & Blue Sky; Label: Legacy (88883704942); Format: 2-CD	—	
2014	True to the Blues: The Johnny Winter Story	Recorded: 1968–2011 for various labels; Label: Legacy (88883740852); Format: 4-CD box set	—	
2015	Remembrance Vol. 1	Recorded: Live recordings released as part of "Live Bootleg Series"; Label: Friday Music (FRM 1166); Format: 3-CDs	—	
2015	It's My Life, Baby	Released: April 18, 2015; Label: Alligator; Format: LP; Note: Initially released on Record Store Day in 2015	—	
2017	Remembrance Vol. 2	Recorded: Live recordings released as part of "Live Bootleg Series"; Label: Friday Music (FRM 1177); Format: 3-CDs	—	
"—" denotes a release that did not chart

== Singles ==
List of singles with year, title, details, chart peak, and reference(s)
Year	Title A-side / B-side	Details	Chart peak Hot 100	Ref(s)
1959	"School Day Blues" / "You Know I Love You"	Label: Dart (131); Note: The Winter brothers are listed on the single as 'Johnny and the Jammers'	—	
1960	"Creepy" / "Oh My Darling"	Label: KRCo (106)	—	
1960	"One Night of Love" / "Hey, Hey, Hey"	Label: KRCo (107); Note: As 'Johnny Winter and the Crystaliers'	—	
1961	"Shed So Many Tears" / "That's What Love Does"	Label: Frolic (45-501)	—	
1962	"Voodoo Twist" / "Ease My Pain"	Label: Frolic (45-503)	—	
1963	"Crying in My Heart" / "Broke and Lonely"	Label: Diamond Jim (204) (Note: "Crying in My Heart" with "Broke and Lonely" was re-released by Jin Records (174).); Note: As 'Texas Guitar Slim'	—	
1963	"Road Runner" / "The Guy You Left Behind"	Label: Todd (45-1084)	—	
1963	"Gangster of Love" / "Eternally"	Label: Frolic (509)	—	
1964	"Eternally" / "You'll Be the Death of Me"	Label: Atlantic (45-2248)	—	
1964	"Gone For Bad" / "I Won´t Believe It"	Label: MGM (K 13380); Note: Originally released by Frolic (512)	—	
1966	"Please Come Home for Christmas" / "Out of Sight"	Label: Cascade (364); Note: The Winter brothers are listed as 'The Insight'	—	
1967	"Birds Can't Row Boats" / "Leavin' Blues"	Recorded: 1966; Label: Pacemaker (PM-243)	—	
1967	"Tramp" / "Parchman Farm"	Label: Universal (U-30496); Note: As 'The Traits' (Johnny leading Roy Head's former backup band) (Note: Although Winter's AllMusic biography states that he also recorded a version of "Harlem Shuffle" with the Traits, Sullivan's more comprehensive book about Winter does not mention the 1966 single: "In 1967, Johnny also performed briefly with the Traits, a Houston-based band, and played on 'Tramp'/'Parchman Farm,' ... He joined the band after vocalist Roy Head left, which was shortly after the release of the band's hit single 'Treat Her Right'.")	—	
1968	"Rollin' and Tumblin'" / "Mean Town Blues"	Label: Sonobeat (R-S107); Album: The Progressive Blues Experiment; Note: First single with Tommy Shannon (bass guitar) and Uncle John Turner (drums)	—	
1969	"Rollin' and Tumblin'" / "Forty Four"	Label: Imperial (66376); Album: The Progressive Blues Experiment	— (Note: On Billboard's Bubbling Under Hot 100 chart, "Rollin' and Tumblin'" (Imperial) reached No. 129.)	
1969	"I'm Yours and I'm Hers" / "I'll Drown in My Tears"	Label: Columbia (4-44900); Album: Johnny Winter	—	
1969	"Johnny B. Goode" / " I'm Not Sure"	Label: Columbia (4-45058); Album: Second Winter	92	
1970	"Rock and Roll, Hoochie Koo" / "21st Century Man"	Label: Columbia (4-45260); Album: Johnny Winter And (B-side is non-album track); Note: B-side recorded September 20, 1970	—	
1971	"Jumpin' Jack Flash" / "Good Morning Little School Girl"	Label: Columbia (4-45368); Album: Live Johnny Winter And	89	
1973	"Silver Train" / "Rock & Roll"	Label: Columbia (4-45860); Album: Still Alive and Well	— (Note: On the Cash Box Looking Ahead chart, "Silver Train" reached No. 112, "Stone County" No. 106, and "Boney Moroney" No. 103.)	
1973	"Can't You Feel It" / "Rock & Roll"	Label: Columbia (4-45899); Album: Still Alive and Well	—	
1974	"Stone County" / "Bad Luck Situation"	Label: Columbia (4-46006); Album: Saints & Sinners	—	
1974	"Boney Moroney" / "Hurtin' So Bad"	Label: Columbia (4-46036); Album: Saints & Sinners	—	
1974	"Raised on Rock" / "Pick Up on My Mojo"	Label: Blue Sky (ZS4 2754); Album: John Dawson Winter III	—	
1974	"Golden Olden Days of Rock & Roll" / "Stranger"	Label: Blue Sky (ZS8 2756); Album: John Dawson Winter III	—	
1976	"Let the Good Times Roll" / "Soul Man"	Label: Blue Sky (ZS8 2764); Album: Together; Note: Listed as 'Johnny and Edgar Winter'	—	
"—" denotes a release that did not chart

== Albums as producer and/or guitarist ==
List of albums by other artists with year, title, details, chart peak, and reference(s)
Year	Title	Details	Chart peak Billboard 200	Ref(s)
1975	Temple of Birth	Artist: Jeremy Steig; Released: 1975; Label: Columbia (KC 33297); Format: LP record; Note: Johnny Winter plays guitar on three tracks.	—	
1977	Hard Again	Artist: Muddy Waters; Released: January 10, 1977; Label: Blue Sky (PZ 34449); Format: LP, audio cassette; Note: Winter produced the album and plays guitar; won Grammy Award for Best Ethnic or Traditional Folk Recording.	143	
1978	I'm Ready	Artist: Muddy Waters; Released: February 1978; Label: Blue Sky (JZ 34928); Format: LP, cassette, 8-track audio cartridge; Note: Winter produced the album and plays guitar, and sings on one track; won Grammy for Best Ethnic or Traditional Folk Recording.	157	
1979	Muddy "Mississippi" Waters – Live	Artist: Muddy Waters; Released: January 1979; Recorded live: March 18, 1977 – August 26, 1978; Label: Blue Sky (JZ 35712); Format: LP, cassette, 8-track; Note: Winter produced the album, plays guitar on several tracks, and sings backing vocals on one track; won Grammy for Best Ethnic or Traditional Folk Recording.	—	
1979	Blast	Artist: Blast (with Ula Hedwig and Jaroslav Jakubovič); Released: 1979; Label: Columbia (JC 36012); Format: LP; Note: Winter plays guitar.	—	
1981	King Bee	Artist: Muddy Waters; Released: 1981; Label: Blue Sky (PZ 37064); Format: LP, cassette, 8-track; Note: Winter produced the album and plays guitar.	192	
1984	Whoopin'	Artist: Sonny Terry; Released: 1984; Label: Alligator (AL 4734); Format: LP, cassette, compact audio disc (CD); Note: Winter produced the album and plays guitar and piano.	—	
2007	Breakin' It Up, Breakin' It Down	Artist: Muddy Waters, Johnny Winter, James Cotton; Released: 2007; Recorded: March 1977 (live); Label: Epic (88697 07283 2); Format: CD; Note: Winter plays guitar and sings on some tracks.	—	
2018	Both Sides of the Sky	Artist: Jimi Hendrix; Released: 2018; Recorded: May 7, 1969; Label: Legacy (19075814192); Format: CD; Note: Winter plays guitar on "Things I Used to Do" (demo).	8	(Note: Although he is often listed as the second guitarist on Woke Up This Morning and Found Myself Dead, the infamous live Jimi Hendrix jam bootleg with Jim Morrison, Winter claims "I didn't play with him [Morrison]; I never even met Jim Morrison. It really worried me that they had that record out and said I was on it when I wasn't.")
"—" denotes a release that did not chart

== Concert videos ==
List of concert videos with year, title, details, chart peak, and reference(s)
Year	Title	Details	Chart peak	Ref(s)
2012	Live from Japan	Released: 2012; Recorded: April 15, 2011; Label: MVD Visual (MVD5421D); Format: DVD	—	
2016	Live in Sweden 1987	Artist: Johnny Winter with Dr. John; Released: April 22, 2016; Recorded: 1987; Label: MVD Visual (MVD8127D); Format: DVD	—	
"—" denotes a release that did not chart

== Documentary film ==
Johnny Winter: Down & Dirty is a documentary film about the life and music career of Johnny Winter. It was directed by Greg Olliver and is 104 minutes long. The movie premiered on March 12, 2014, at the South by Southwest Film Festival. It was released on DVD on March 4, 2016.

== Bibliography ==
- Ruhlmann, William (1996). "Johnny Winter". In Erlewine, Michael; Bogdanov, Vladimir; Woodstra, Chris; Koda, Cub (eds.). All Music Guide to the Blues: The Experts' Guide to the Best Blues Recordings. All Music Guide to the Blues. Miller Freeman Books. ISBN 978-0-87930-424-9.
- Kent, David (1993). Australian Chart Book 1970–1992 (illustrated ed.). Australian Chart Book. ISBN 978-0-646-11917-5.
- Sullivan, Mary Lou (2010). Raisin' Cain: The Wild and Raucous Story of Johnny Winter. Backbeat Books. ISBN 978-0-87930-973-2.
- Whitburn, Joel (2015). The Comparison Book Billboard/Cash Box/Record World 1954–1982. Sheridan Books. ISBN 978-0-89820-213-7.
