= True to the Blues: The Johnny Winter Story =

Compilation album by Johnny Winter
- Released: February 25, 2014
- Recorded: 1968–2011
- Genres: Blues; Blues rock
- Label: Legacy
- Producer: Jerry Rappaport

Johnny Winter chronology
Live Bootleg Series Vol. 10 (2013)	True to the Blues: The Johnny Winter Story (2014)	Live Bootleg Special Edition (2014)

True to the Blues: The Johnny Winter Story is a compilation album by blues rock guitarist and singer Johnny Winter. Comprising four CDs, and packaged as a box set, it contains songs selected from numerous albums – some recorded in the studio and some live – released over a 43-year period, from 1968 to 2011, as well as several previously unreleased tracks. The box set also includes a 50-page booklet of essays and photos. It was released by Legacy Recordings on February 25, 2014.

== Critical reception ==
Professional ratings
Review scores
Source	Rating
All About Jazz	5/5 stars
AllMusic	4/5 stars
Mojo	3/5 stars
PopMatters	7/10

On AllMusic, Steve Legett said, "by the end of [the 1960s] Winter had returned to the blues, where being an amazing electric guitar player with a roaring voice brought him his true calling. That's where this four-disc, 56-track box set picks up the story, the first such set to span the commercial and in-the-public-eye portion of Winter's career, beginning in 1968 and running all the way through to his Roots album, which was released in 2011, deftly drawing on some 27 albums from various labels ... It's an impressive catalog of blistering slide runs and manic, propulsive blues shuffles, stomps, and boogies, all delivered with Winter's roar of a voice. Winter's career has made him nothing short of a monument, really, in the postmodern blues world ..."

In All About Jazz, John Kelman wrote, "True to the Blues: The Johnny Winter Story does, indeed, focus heavily on the albino Texan's first and most successful decade—and, most assuredly not coincidentally, the time when he was ... signed to Columbia Records, a label then prepared to put serious money behind him, and ultimately yield significant visibility. Still, this four-disc, four-and-a-half hour collection does manage to include, on the fourth CD, at least some representation of Winter's post-Columbia discography for labels like Alligator and Virgin, straight through to his 2011 Megaforce release, Roots."

On Ultimate Classic Rock, Jeff Giles said, "How do you sum up a recording career spanning more than five decades and over 25 albums? There's obviously no foolproof way to do it, but the folks at Legacy have made it look easy with True to the Blues: The Johnny Winter Story … if you’ve never experienced Johnny Winter's music, True to the Blues makes for an excellent primer, offering choice moments throughout his development as a singer, songwriter, and player."

In PopMatters, Steve Horowitz wrote, "[In the late '60s and early '70s Johnny Winter] was a blues rocker with an emphasis on the rocker. But then Winter changed to a more blues oriented musician. As this compilation shows, Winter always had elements of both genres in his electric guitar playing … The anthology shows Winter had the cosmic ability to shred and find the soul of a song from the beginning. He took his axe to newly discovered worlds of feedback and kept on whacking."

On No Depression, Grant Britt said, "This is a fitting epitaph, but still not his final statement. The latest chapter of his continuing roots saga called Step Back was set to come out in September featuring a dazzling array of guitarists including Eric Clapton, Billy Gibbons, Joe Bonamassa, Leslie West, and Dr. John. But his is not a tragic ending. Johnny Winter went out still at the top of his powers after doing yet another successful show, giving his fans what they wanted but could never get enough of. That's a legacy any man would be proud to leave behind."

== Track listing ==
Disc 1
From The Progressive Blues Experiment (1968):

1. "Bad Luck and Trouble" (Johnny Winter) – 3:44
2. "Mean Town Blues" (Winter) – 4:29

From Fillmore East: The Lost Concert Tapes 12/13/68 (recorded 1968, released 2003):

3. Mike Bloomfield's introduction of Johnny Winter – 1:04
4. "It's My Own Fault" (John Lee Hooker, Jules Taub, B.B. King) – 10:58

From Johnny Winter (1969):

5. "I'm Yours and I'm Hers" (Winter) – 4:31
6. "Mean Mistreater" (James Gordon) – 3:54
7. "Dallas" (Winter) – 2:47
8. "Be Careful with a Fool" (Joe Josea, King) – 5:16

From The Woodstock Experience (recorded 1969, released 2009):

9. "Leland Mississippi Blues" (Winter) – 4:51

From Second Winter: Legacy Edition (1969; Legacy Edition 2008):

10. "Memory Pain" (Percy Mayfield) – 5:30
11. "Highway 61 Revisited" (Bob Dylan) – 5:07
12. "Miss Ann" (Enotris Johnson, Little Richard) – 3:40
13. "Hustled down in Texas" (Winter) – 3:32
14. "Black Cat Bone" (Winter) – 5:36
15. "Johnny B. Goode" (Chuck Berry) – 3:33

Disc 2
Recorded at the Atlanta Pop Festival (1970) – previously unreleased:

1. "Eyesight to the Blind" (Sonny Boy Williamson) – 5:03
2. Johnny Winter's intro – 0:43
3. "Prodigal Son" (Winter) – 5:12

Recorded at the Atlanta Pop Festival (1970) – previously released on The First Great Rock Festivals of the Seventies (1971):

4. "Mean Mistreater" (Gordon) – 5:48

From Johnny Winter And (1970):

5. "Rock and Roll, Hoochie Koo" (Rick Derringer) – 3:31
6. "Guess I'll Go Away" (Winter) – 3:27
7. "On the Limb" (Derringer) – 3:35

From Live Johnny Winter And (recorded 1970, released 1971):

8. "It's My Own Fault" (Hooker, Jules Taub, King) – 11:45
9. "Jumpin' Jack Flash" (Mick Jagger, Keith Richards) – 4:26

From Live at the Fillmore East 10/3/70 (recorded 1970, released 2010):

10. "Good Morning Little School Girl" (Don Level, Bob Love) – 4:40
11. "Mean Town Blues" (Winter) – 17:31

Disc 3
From Still Alive and Well (1973):

1. "Still Alive and Well" (Derringer) – 3:44
2. "Rock Me Baby" (Arthur Crudup, Big Bill Broonzy) – 3:50
3. "Rock & Roll" (Winter) – 4:45

From Saints & Sinners (1974):

4. "Rollin' Cross the Country" (Dan Hartman, Winter) – 4:33
5. "Hurtin' So Bad" (Winter) – 4:40
6. "Bad Luck Situation" (Winter) – 2:50

From John Dawson Winter III (1974):

7. "Self Destructive Blues" (Winter) – 3:28
8. "Sweet Papa John" (Winter) – 3:10
9. "Rock and Roll People" (John Lennon) – 2:45

From Together (1976):

10. "Harlem Shuffle" (Bobby Relf, Earl Nelson) – 3:38

From Captured Live! (1976):

11. "Bony Moronie" (Larry Williams) – 6:42
12. "Roll with Me" (Derringer) – 4:53

From Nothin' but the Blues (1977):

13. "Tired of Tryin'" (Winter) – 3:41
14. "TV Mama" (Winter) – 3:12
15. "Walkin' thru the Park" (Muddy Waters) – 4:06

From Breakin' It Up, Breakin' It Down (recorded 1977, released 2007):

16. "I Done Got Over It" (Guitar Slim) – 6:01

Disc 4
From The Essential Johnny Winter (released 2013):

1. "One Step at a Time" (Winter) – 4:00
2. "Honest I Do" (Ewart Abner, Jimmy Reed) – 4:21

From White, Hot and Blue (1978):

3. "Nickel Blues" (Winter) – 3:34

From Raisin' Cain (1980):

4. "Talk Is Cheap" (Jim Liban) – 4:42
5. "Wolf in Sheep's Clothing" (Jon Paris) – 5:33
6. "Bon Ton Roulet" (Clarence Garlow) – 4:45

From Guitar Slinger (1984):

7. "Don't Take Advantage of Me" (Lonnie Brooks) – 5:25

From Serious Business (1985):

8. "Master Mechanic" (Steve Prestage, Joe Shamwell, Walter Godbold) – 3:38

From Third Degree (1986):

9. "Mojo Boogie" (J. B. Lenoir) – 4:52

From The Winter of '88 (1988):

10. "Stranger Blues" (Clarence Lewis, Elmore James, Morris Levy) – 6:56

From Let Me In (1991):

11. "Illustrated Man" (Fred James, Mary-Ann Brandon) – 3:40

From Hey, Where's Your Brother? (1992):

12. "Hard Way" (T-Bone Walker, Grover McDaniel) – 4:00

From The 30th Anniversary Concert Celebration (recorded 1992, released 1993):

13. "Highway 61 Revisited" (Dylan) – 6:12

From Roots (2011):

14. "Maybellene" (Berry) – 2:48
15. "Dust My Broom" (Robert Johnson) – 6:02

== Personnel ==
Musicians

- Johnny Winter: guitar, resonator guitar, acoustic guitar, harmonica, mandolin, bass, drums, vocals
- Gene Barge – tenor saxophone
- Mike Bloomfield – guitar
- Randy Brecker – trumpet
- Bobby Caldwell – drums
- Charles Calmese – bass
- Tom Compton – drums
- James Cotton – harmonica
- John Cresci – drums
- Steve Cropper – guitar
- Lew Del Gatto – tenor saxophone
- Rick Derringer – guitar, vocals
- Mike DiMeo – piano
- Willie Dixon – acoustic bass
- Donald "Duck" Dunn – bass
- Steve Elsen – baritone saxophone
- Jim Exum – trombone
- Anton Fig – drums
- Jeff Ganz – bass
- Johnny B. Gayden – bass
- Vince Gill – guitar
- Paul Harris – piano
- Dan Hartman – guitar, bass, piano, vocals
- Randy Jo Hobbs – bass, percussion, vocals
- Walter "Shakey" Horton – harmonica
- Richard Hughes – drums, percussion
- Jerry Jemmott – bass
- Dr. John – piano
- Booker T. Jones – organ
- Casey Jones – drums
- Kansas – handclaps
- Jim Keltner – drums
- Al Kooper – organ
- Vito Luzzi – drums
- Bob Margolin – guitar
- Paul Nelson – guitar
- Terry Ogolini – tenor saxophone
- Jon Paris – bass, harmonica
- Pinetop Perkins – piano
- Floyd Radford – guitar
- Pat Ramsey – harmonica
- Chick Ruff – drums
- Pat Rush – guitar
- Ken Saydak – piano
- Tommy Shannon – bass
- G. E. Smith – guitar
- Willie "Big Eyes" Smith – drums
- Scott Spray – bass
- Tom Strohman – saxophone
- I.P. Sweet – bass
- Don Tenuto – trumpet
- Bobby Torello – drums
- Derek Trucks – guitar
- "Uncle" John Turner – drums, percussion
- Muddy Waters – guitar, vocals
- Edgar Winter – saxophone, piano, organ, ARP String Synthesizer, tack piano, drums, vocals
- Randy Z – drums

Production

- Jerry Rappaport – compilation producer
- Paul Nelson – executive producer
- Mark Wilder – mastering
- Federico Ruiz – art direction, design
