= The Johnny Winter Anthology =

Compilation album by Johnny Winter
- Released: 2009
- Genre: Blues
- Label: Shout! Factory

Johnny Winter chronology
| Live Bootleg Series Vol. 4 (2009) | The Johnny Winter Anthology (2009) | The Woodstock Experience (2009) |

Professional ratings
Review scores
| Source | Rating |
|---|---|
| Allmusic | 3/5 stars |

The Johnny Winter Anthology is the first collection to include songs from blues musician Johnny Winter's entire career, from his start at Imperial Records, to his rise to worldwide fame on Columbia and Blue Sky, to his late-career renaissance at Alligator, Pointblank and Virgin.

== Track listing ==
=== Disc one ===
1. "Rollin' and Tumblin'" (from: The Progressive Blues Experiment)
2. "Be Careful With a Fool" (from: Johnny Winter)
3. "Country Girl" (from: Johnny Winter)
4. "I’m Yours And I’m Hers" (from: Johnny Winter)
5. "Highway 61 Revisited" (from: Second Winter)
6. "Hustled Down in Texas" (from: Second Winter)
7. "Memory Pain" (from: Second Winter)
8. "Slippin' and Slidin'" (from: Second Winter)
9. "Black Cat Bone (Live)"
10. "Look Up" (from: Johnny Winter And)
11. "Prodigal Son" (from: Johnny Winter And)
12. "Rock and Roll, Hoochie Koo" (from: Johnny Winter And)
13. "Good Morning Little School Girl (Live)" (from: Live Johnny Winter And)
14. "Jumpin' Jack Flash (Live)" (from: Live Johnny Winter And)
15. "Mean Town Blues (Live)" (from: Live Johnny Winter And)
16. "Johnny B. Goode (Live)" (from: Live Johnny Winter And)
17. "All Tore Down" (from: Still Alive and Well)

=== Disc two ===
1. "Still Alive and Well" (from: Still Alive and Well)
2. "Silver Train" (from: Still Alive and Well)
3. "Rock Me Baby" (from: Still Alive and Well)
4. "Bony Moronie" (from: Saints & Sinners)
5. "Rolling Cross the Country" (from: Saints & Sinners)
6. "Stone County" (from: Saints & Sinners)
7. "Thirty Days" (from: Saints & Sinners)
8. "Rock & Roll People" (from: John Dawson Winter III)
9. "Self-Destructive Blues" (from: John Dawson Winter III)
10. "It's All Over Now (Live)" (from: Captured Live!)
11. "Rock & Roll Medley (Live):" (from: Together)
  1. "Slippin' and Slidin'"
  2. "Jailhouse Rock"
  3. "Tutti Frutti"
  4. "Sick and Tired"
12. "Sweet Love and Evil Women" (from: Nothin' but the Blues)
13. "Messin' with the Kid" (from: White, Hot and Blue)
14. "Like a Rolling Stone" (from: Raisin' Cain)
15. "It’s My Life, Baby" (from: Guitar Slinger)
16. "Johnny Guitar" (from: Hey, Where's Your Brother?)
17. "Hideaway (Live)" (from: Live in NYC '97)
18. "Lone Wolf" (from: I'm a Bluesman)
