= Steve Paul =

American music manager (1941–2012)

- Born: Stephen Neal Paul; April 28, 1941; The Bronx, New York City, New York, U.S.
- Died: October 21, 2012 (aged 71); Queens, New York City, New York, U.S.
- Education: Dobbs Ferry High School
- Occupations: Talent manager, nightclub owner
- Partner: Robert Kitchen

Stephen Neal Paul (April 28, 1941 – October 21, 2012) was an American talent manager and nightclub owner. Paul was the one-time manager of Johnny Winter, among other related performers, as well as being the owner of The Scene, a popular New York City club from 1964 to 1970, and the founder of Blue Sky Records.

== Early life ==
Paul was born in the Bronx. His father was a high school principal. Paul attended Dobbs Ferry High School where he graduated at 16. He began his career at the age of 17 doing public relations for a New York City restaurant and Peppermint Lounge.

== Career ==
Paul first became known as the owner of Steve Paul's The Scene, a popular New York City club that opened in 1964.

He was the host of his own TV show, The Steve Paul Scene, broadcast in September 1967. The show featured live performances by The Blues Project, Moby Grape, The Staple Singers and Aretha Franklin.

In 1968, he became the manager of Johnny Winter. Paul had travelled from New York to Texas to successfully promote his managerial abilities to Winter, after reading a Rolling Stone review of Texas music by Larry Sepulvado, in which Winter was described as "the hottest item outside of Janis Joplin". Based on Paul's negotiating abilities, Winter shortly thereafter in 1968 signed the then-largest recording contract ever offered by Columbia Records: $600,000, payable over five years.

Winter performed regularly at Steve Paul's New York club, The Scene, where various artists, such as Jimi Hendrix, Jim Morrison and Janis Joplin, would make guest appearances. Many of these performances were of historic significance, such as the performance by Jimi Hendrix, Buddy Miles and Johnny Winter in February 1969. It is also the place where on March 18, 1968, Jimi Hendrix and a very intoxicated Jim Morrison accompanied by Buddy Miles were recorded together live, on Hendrix's own recording device, a recording which has become notoriously sought after by fans and collectors alike.

Johnny Winter appeared at Woodstock Music Festival, but his performance was not included in the film or initial soundtrack recordings, due to unresolved contractual issues between Steve Paul and the festival organizers, prior to Winter's performance.

Steve Paul was Winter's manager for fifteen years. In 1970, Paul, who also managed The McCoys, brought the artists together, resulting in Winter's successful Johnny Winter And (1970), including the hit "Rock and Roll, Hoochie Koo". The McCoys had first met Winter during their term as the resident house band at The Scene, commencing in 1969.

=== Blue Sky Records ===
In 1973, Paul started Blue Sky Records, a label promoted and distributed by Columbia Records. Between 1973 and 1982, it became the principal recording label for Johnny Winter, Edgar Winter, Rick Derringer, Dan Hartman, and David Johansen, all of whom were managed by Paul. Through Johnny Winter's involvement as a producer, the label is also credited with reviving the later career of Muddy Waters. The label largely ceased operations with Winter's departure in 1983, which coincided with the termination of his management relationship with Steve Paul.

== Later years and death ==
In the 2000s, Paul developed Downtown TV, an online entertainment network. He also produced musical revues on and off Broadway and nightclubs.

On October 21, 2012, Paul died of undisclosed causes in a Queens area hospital at the age of 71.
