= Live at the Fillmore East 10/3/70 =

Live album by Johnny Winter
- Released: April 20, 2010
- Recorded: October 3, 1970
- Genre: Blues rock
- Length: 66:40
- Label: Collectors' Choice
- Producer: Bob Irwin

Johnny Winter chronology
Live Bootleg Series Vol. 6 (2010)	Live at the Fillmore East 10/3/70 (2010)	Live Bootleg Series Vol. 7 (2011)

Live at the Fillmore East 10/3/70 is an album by Johnny Winter And, a blues rock band led by guitarist and singer Johnny Winter. As the name suggests, the album was recorded live at the Fillmore East in New York City on October 3, 1970. It was released by Collectors' Choice Music on April 20, 2010.

Johnny Winter And featured two lead guitarists – Winter, and Rick Derringer — along with Randy Jo Hobbs on bass and Bobby Caldwell on drums. Another album from the same concert tour is Live Johnny Winter And, which came out in 1971. The band also released an eponymous studio album, recorded several months earlier with a different drummer – Rick Derringer's brother Randy Zehringer.

== Critical reception ==
Professional ratings
Review scores
Source	Rating
Allmusic	4.5/5 stars

On AllMusic, Thom Jurek said, "This is the Johnny Winter And group simply tearing it up on a selection of originals and covers. The sound quality is phenomenal and the energy on this gig not only rivals that of [Live Johnny Winter And], it leaves it in the dust.... The improvisation and guitar challenges are voluminous, wildly energetic, and creative.... This set blows the stuff in Winter’s own officially released bootleg series away, and becomes his definitive live recording, hands down."

In PopMatters, David Maine wrote, "The Johnny Winter set, recorded at the Fillmore East in 1970 with sideman Rick Derringer, is a fiery blend of guitar-stomp blues and blues rock originals. The sound quality is excellent overall, especially for trebleheads. Bass and percussion tones are a little thin, but the vocals and guitars ring through loud and clear.... Winter and Derringer’s back-and-forth guitar assault is worth the price all by itself, and, with a frenetic version of Winter's "Mean Town Blues" checking in at 18 minutes, the set does not want for extended workouts."

On Blogcritics, Glen Boyd said, "The chemistry between guitarists Winter and Derringer is undeniable, and a good argument could be made based on this recording that Winter never again found a foil quite like Derringer — at least within the context of a blues rock band. But speaking of the blues, this is still the area where Winter himself most shines as a guitarist. Nowhere is this more evident than on the 22-minute "It's My Own Fault". Listening to this track today, in retrospect, it's clear that the blues was where Winter's true musical heart [lay] even way back then."

== Track listing ==
Track listing
No.	Title	Writer(s)	Length
1.	"Guess I’ll Go Away" (from the album ‘’Johnny Winter And‘’, 1970)	Johnny Winter	4:39
2.	"Good Morning Little School Girl" (from the album ‘’Johnny Winter‘’, 1969)	Sonny Boy Williamson	3:37
3.	"Rock and Roll, Hoochie Koo" (from the album ‘’Johnny Winter And‘’, 1970)	Rick Derringer	4:47
4.	"It's My Own Fault" (from the album ‘’The Progressive Blues Experiment‘’, 1968)	Riley King, Jules Taub	22:24
5.	"Highway 61 Revisited" (from the album ‘’Second Winter‘’, 1969)	Bob Dylan	7:31
6.	"Mean Town Blues" (from the album ‘’The Progressive Blues Experiment‘’, 1968)	Johnny Winter	18:07
7.	"Rollin' and Tumblin'" (from the album ‘’The Progressive Blues Experiment‘’, 1968)	Muddy Waters	4:31

== Personnel ==
Johnny Winter And

- Johnny Winter – guitar, vocals
- Rick Derringer – guitar, vocals
- Randy Jo Hobbs – bass, vocals
- Bobby Caldwell – drums

Production

- Producer, engineer, tape research: Bob Irwin
- Executive producer: Gordon Anderson
- Liner notes: Richie Unterberger
