= The McCoys =

American rock band (1962–1969)

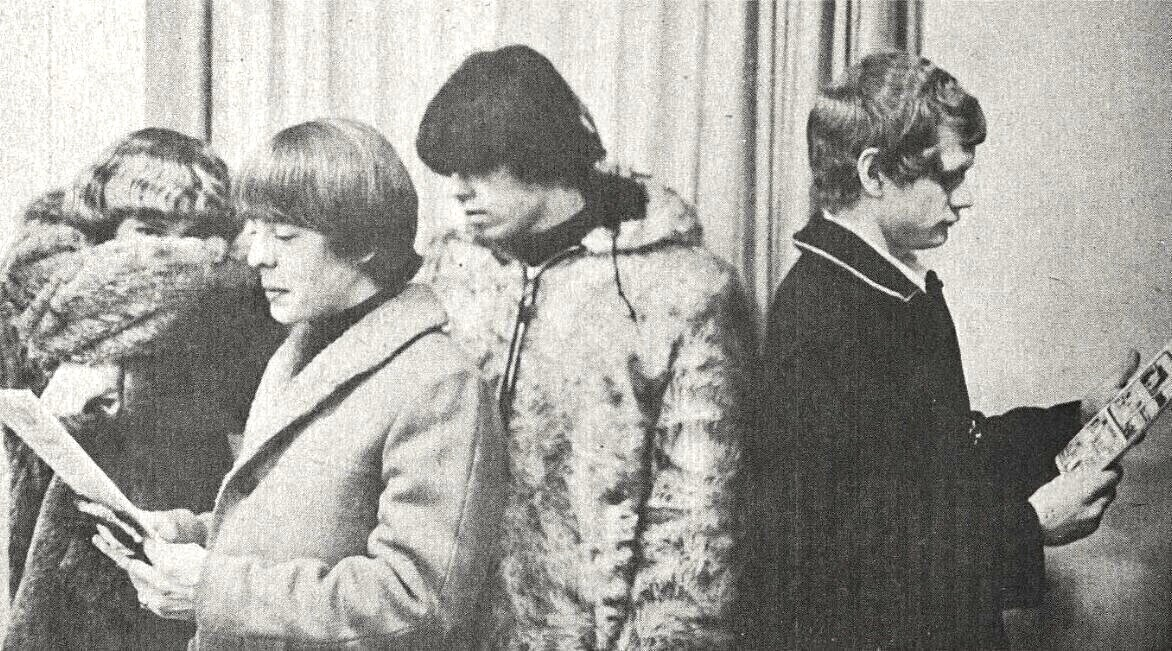
- The McCoys in 1966. From left to right: Randy Z, Rick Derringer, Randy Jo Hobbs, Ronnie Brandon (who departed the group in 1965)

Background information
- Also known as: Rick and the Raiders
- Origin: Fort Recovery, Ohio, U.S.
- Genres: Pop rock, garage rock, rock and roll, psychedelic rock
- Years active: 1962–1969
- Labels: Bang, Immediate, Mercury
- Past members: Rick Derringer; Randy Z Sean Michaels; Ronnie Brandon; Randy Jo Hobbs; Bobby Peterson

The McCoys were an American rock group formed in Fort Recovery, Ohio in 1962. They are best known for their 1965 hit single "Hang On Sloopy". Originally named Rick and the Raiders, they changed their name to "The McCoys" from the B-side of The Ventures' hit record "Walk, Don't Run" titled "The McCoy".

== Career ==
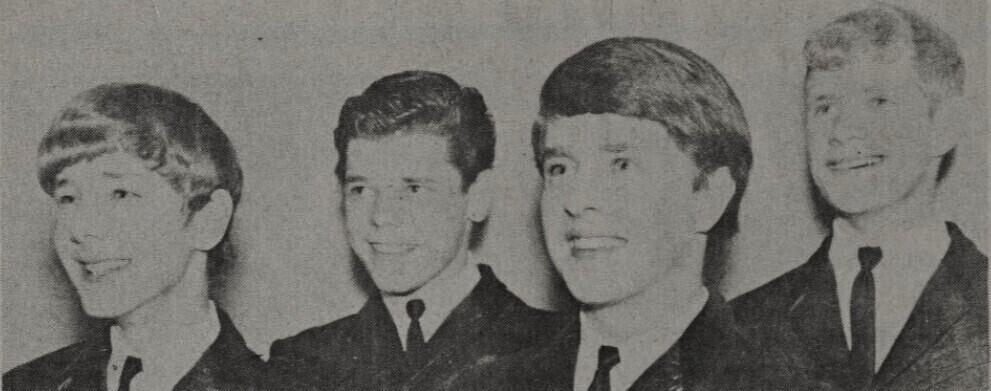
The McCoys in 1966

The original members were all from Union City, Indiana; however, the Zehringer boys were initially from Fort Recovery, Ohio. The band members were guitarist and lead singer Richard Zehringer (later known as Rick Derringer), his brother Randy (later known as Randy Z) on drums, and bassist Dennis Kelly. This first line-up was known as The Rick Z Combo, and later known as Rick and the Raiders. When Kelly left for college, the Zehringers were joined by bassist Randy Jo Hobbs, saxophonist Sean Michaels, and keyboardist Ronnie Brandon. This was the line-up that took the name of "The McCoys". Brandon left the group in 1965 and was replaced by Bobby Peterson on keyboards.

Their best-known hit is "Hang On Sloopy", which was No. 1 in the United States in the Billboard Hot 100 chart in October 1965 and is the official rock song of the state of Ohio. It also is the unofficial fight song of the Ohio State Buckeyes and is played at many Ohio State athletic events by the OSU bands. Sales of the single in the US alone were over one million copies. Other hits include a top 10 cover of "Fever" (Billboard No. 7) and a top 40 cover of Ritchie Valens's "Come On, Let's Go" (Billboard No. 21).

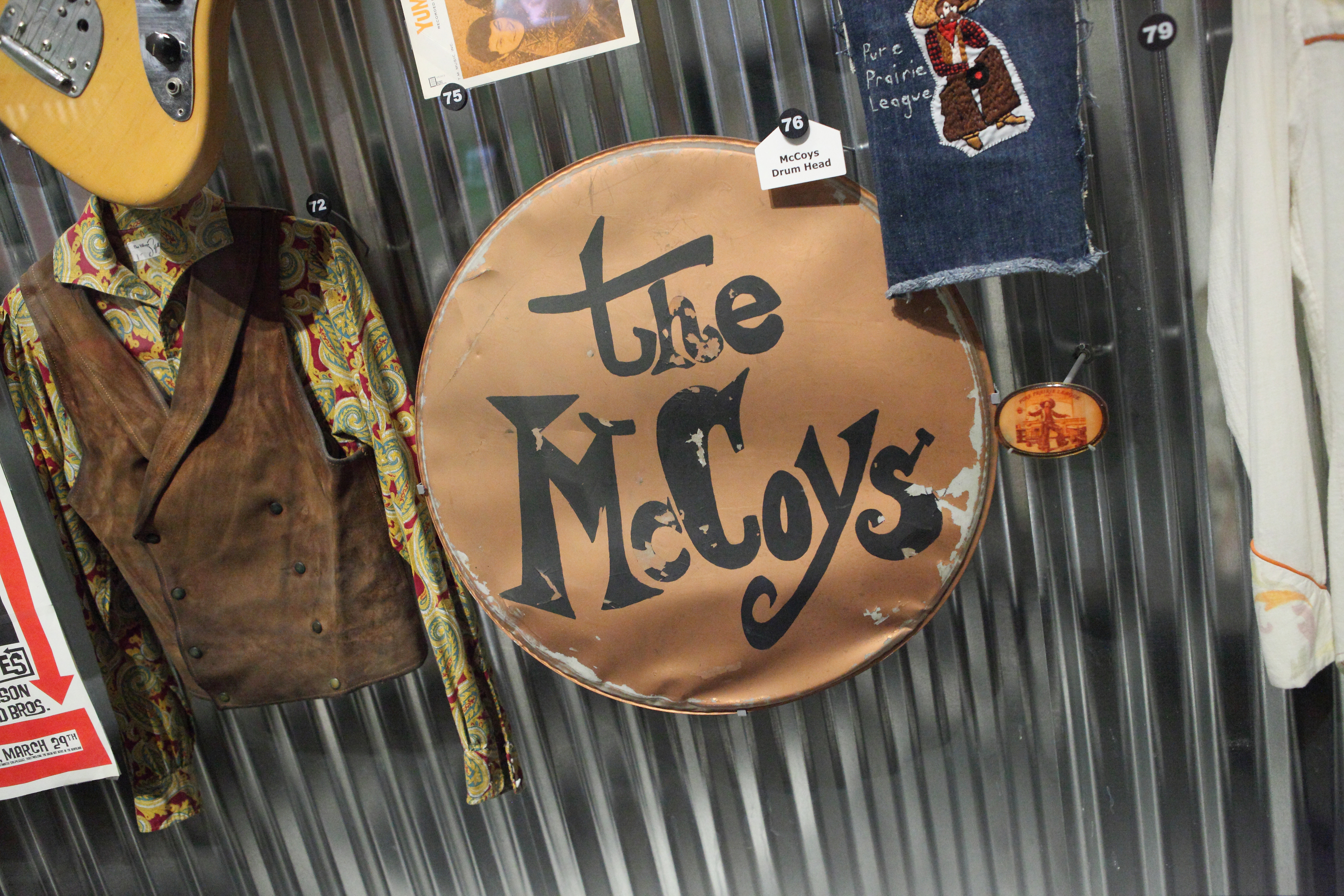
Drumhead featured at the Rock and Roll Hall of Fame in Cleveland

A cover of "Sorrow", the B-side of their version of "Fever", was a hit in the United Kingdom for The Merseys and later covered by David Bowie. Its opening line, "with your long blonde hair and eyes of blue" was quoted by George Harrison in the fadeout of "It's All Too Much", featured on the 1969 soundtrack of Yellow Submarine.

The McCoys performed as part of Murray the K's Christmas show on December 18, 1965, at the Brooklyn Fox Theater. Also performing on the program were Peter & Gordon, Wilson Pickett, The Fortunes, the Moody Blues, The Toys, Lenny Welch, Cannibal and the Headhunters, The Vibrations, The Spinners, The O'Jays, Bloodless Revolutionaries, Patti Michaels, Bobby Diamond, and Diane Langan.

The McCoys were being labeled as a bubblegum pop act, much to the disdain of the band. In 1967, after the death of Bert Berns, The McCoys broke free from Bang Records in hopes of recording more serious music. They ended up signing a deal with Mercury Records and recorded their last two records, Infinite McCoys (1968) and Human Ball (1969), for the label. The albums were The McCoys' attempt at making psychedelic music that would appeal to the mature listeners of that time. Both were commercial failures and did not chart anywhere.

The two Zehringer brothers (then known as Rick Derringer and Randy Z) and Hobbs became Johnny Winter's band for the albums Johnny Winter And and Live Johnny Winter And in 1970 and 1971 respectively. At first, the band was supposed to be called Johnny Winter & The McCoys, but was changed due to management warning Winter about their bubblegum past, and how it could hurt his reputation as a serious musician. As backing musicians, both Derringer and Hobbs contributed to Winter's later releases Still Alive and Well (1973), Saints & Sinners (1974), and John Dawson Winter III (1974). Derringer and Hobbs later played with Edgar Winter as well as appeared on Together (1976). Hobbs later toured with Johnny Winter, but without Derringer, on Winter's Captured Live! (1976). Derringer also played with Steely Dan and Cyndi Lauper and formed bands such as DNA, with drummer Carmine Appice.

Hobbs died of drug-related heart failure on August 5, 1993 (Derringer's birthday) at the age of 45. Peterson died in Gainesville, Florida on July 21, 1993, at the age of 47. On May 27, 2025, it was announced that Rick Derringer had died the previous day at the age of 77.

== Discography ==
=== Albums ===
Year	Album	Billboard 200	Record label
1965	Hang On Sloopy	44	Bang Records
1966	You Make Me Feel So Good	—	Bang Records
1968	Infinite McCoys	—	Mercury Records
1969	Human Ball	—	Mercury Records
1976	Glass Derringer	—	LA International
"—" denotes releases that did not chart.

=== Singles ===
Year	A-side/B-side Both sides from same album except where indicated	Label & reference	Chart Positions				Album
Year	A-side/B-side Both sides from same album except where indicated	Label & reference	US	US CB	CAN (CHUM/RPM)	UK	Album
1965	"Hang On Sloopy" b/w "I Can't Explain It"	Bang 506	1	1	—	5	Hang On Sloopy
1965	"Fever" b/w "Sorrow"	Bang 511	7	9	2	44	Hang On Sloopy
1966	"Up and Down" b/w "If You Tell a Lie" (from Hang on Sloopy)	Bang 516	46	50	75	—	Non-album track
1966	"Come On, Let's Go" b/w "Little People"	Bang 522	22	17	36	51 (Note: Chart position is from the official UK "Breakers List".)	You Make Me Feel So Good
1966	"(You Make Me Feel) So Good" b/w "Runaway"	Bang 527	53	53	42	—	You Make Me Feel So Good
1966	"Don't Worry Mother, Your Son's Heart Is Pure" b/w "Ko-Ko"	Bang 532	67	60	46	—	Non-album tracks
1967	"I Got to Go Back (and Watch That Little Girl Dance)" b/w "Dynamite" (from You Make Me Feel So Good)	Bang 538	69	90	34	—	Non-album tracks
1967	"Beat The Clock" b/w "Like You Do to Me"	Bang 543	92	79	—	—	Non-album tracks
1967	"Say Those Magic Words" b/w "I Wonder If She Remembers Me" (Non-album track)	Bang 549	—	—	—	—	You Make Me Feel So Good
1968	"Jesse Brady" b/w "Resurrection"	Mercury 72843	98	94	—	—	Infinite McCoys
1968	"Epilogue" b/w "Daybreak"	Mercury 72897	—	—	—	—	Human Ball
1969	"Love Don't Stop" b/w "Only Human"	Mercury 72917	—	—	—	—	Human Ball
1969	"Don't Fight It" b/w "Rosa Rodrigues"	Mercury 72967	—	—	—	—	Non-album tracks
"—" denotes releases that did not chart or were not released in that territory.

== See also ==
- 1965 in music
- List of Billboard Hot 100 number-one singles of 1965
