= Pirates World =

Former amusement park in Dania, Florida

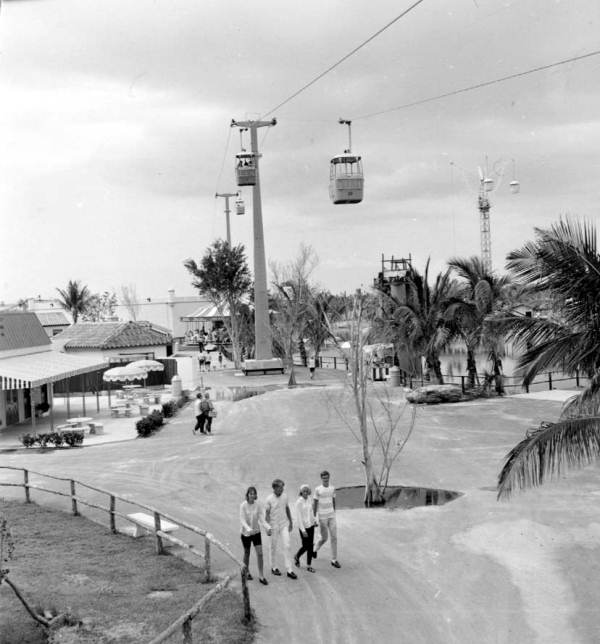
- Sky trail amusement ride at Pirates World, 1967
- Interactive map of Pirates World
- Location: Dania, Florida, United States
- Coordinates: 26.04°N 80.13°W
- Status: Defunct
- Opened: 1967
- Closed: 1973
- Owner: Recreation Corporation of America
- Area: 78 acres (32 ha)

Attractions
- Total: 15+
- Roller coasters: 2
- Water rides: 2 (log flume & pirate ship)

Pirates World was a 100-acre (40 ha) pirate-themed amusement park in Dania, Florida, that opened April 8, 1967. Developed by Recreation Corporation of America, it was located on the north side of Sheridan Street between U.S. Route 1 and A1A. With the opening of Walt Disney World in 1971, attendance dropped drastically, and the park was closed in 1973.

== History ==
Pirates World was successful in its early years, but in 1971 Walt Disney World opened in Florida, which took much business away from the theme park. In 1973, it became bankrupt and closed (though some sources list the park as having closed in 1975). Norman Kaufman, a venturing carnival rides owner back in Coney Island, bought some of the steeplechase's fiberglass horses and eventually gave one of them to the "Coney Island, USA" museum more than 20 years later. The fate of the others is unknown.

In 1978, a biblical theme park was to have been developed on the site, but those plans fell through. The land was sold, zoned residential and condominiums were built over the last traces of the park.

== Attractions ==
The park featured "The Crow's Nest" observation tower, which had originally been the Belgian Aerial Tower at the 1964 New York World's Fair. This structure was bought secondhand after the fair and transported to the site, where it was re-erected. It consisted of a central post from which were suspended four metal cages by cables, designed to carry several standing passengers. To balance the structure, two cages would be in the air while two were being loaded on the ground, and the cages would be raised and lowered simultaneously.

Another feature was the pirate ship ride - an actual life-sized pirate ship. The ship, piloted by park personnel, cruised along a "river" through a barrage of cannon fire and "enemy" pirates shooting at the ship, while the pirates that were aboard the ship were firing back at them, protecting their passengers from harm.

There were amusement park games owned and run by Cindy and Joe Dickman, along with a petting zoo and seal pond. Members of the Miami Dolphins played the Football Toss, and there was also a shooting gallery. The games at Pirates World were a High striker, Tip the Cats, Tic Tac Toe, ring toss, Football Toss, Can Can and a Watergun game. The petting zoo had an elephant (by 1972, there were deer instead, as the elephant had grown too large for the enclosure) and a seal pond where one could feed fish to the seals.

Also at Pirates World was the "Grand National Steeplechase," which was originally from Coney Island, along with "Wild Beetle Race," a Wild mouse roller coaster, a log flume (also bought second-hand from the New York World Fair), the Pirates Shooting Gallery from Freedomland U.S.A. and various carnival flat rides, including a paratrooper, a sky ride, some carny games, a skee-ball arcade and spiral slides.

== Rock music concerts ==
Pirates World was the venue for several rock music concerts, playing host to such artists as The Jeff Beck Group (1969), Led Zeppelin (1969), Iron Butterfly (1970), Faces (1970, 1971), Grateful Dead (1970), Traffic (1970), Black Sabbath (1971), Blood, Sweat & Tears (1971), Deep Purple (1971), Jethro Tull (1971), Grand Funk Railroad (1971), Steve Miller Band (1971), The Guess Who (1971), The Moody Blues (1971), Emerson, Lake & Palmer (1971), Three Dog Night (1971), Manassas (1972), David Bowie (1972), The Doors (1972), Wishbone Ash (1973), Alice Cooper (1973), Frank Zappa (1973), The Beach Boys (1973), and Steely Dan (1974). The Johnny Winter album Live Johnny Winter And (1971) was partly recorded at Pirates World in fall 1970. It was not uncommon for crowd control problems to break out at some of these concerts. In March 1971, police clashed with concert goers at a Grand Funk Railroad concert. Eleven people were arrested and two policemen were injured.

== Films ==
Over the years, several film and television programs were also filmed on the site, including Jack and the Beanstalk (1970), Thumbelina (1970), Musical Mutiny (1970) and Santa and the Ice Cream Bunny (1972).
