= The Scene (performance venue) =

Nightclub in New York City (1964–69)

Coordinates: 40.76004°N 73.98821°W

The Scene was a nightclub on West 46th Street, Manhattan, New York City operated by Steve Paul between 1964 and 1969. It was notable for historic performances by Tiny Tim, The Doors, the Buffalo Springfield and Jimi Hendrix, among many others.

== History ==
The Scene, also known as "Steve Paul's The Scene", was located in the basement of 301 West 46th Street, in New York's Theater District. Steve Paul had started his entertainment career as a publicist for the Peppermint Lounge. Paul opened the club in 1964, initially as a club for actors, musicians and theatre workers from Broadway. At the time, the only musician in the club was a resident pianist. Regular musical acts commenced in 1966. The shift in focus to musical acts was quite popular, and involved such acts as The Young Rascals, The Lovin' Spoonful, and Sammy Davis Jr. Blood Sweat and Tears with Al Kooper played some of their earliest gigs there. B B King played there for 2 nights and Jimi Hendrix sat in both nights. It also became a popular club with Andy Warhol and those associated with him, including Edie Sedgwick.

The club's initial popularity waned, resulting in a period of closure until reopened with the assistance, financial and otherwise, of such persons as Peter Yarrow, Allen Ginsberg and Tiger Morse. In its second incarnation, the club became particularly popular with Jimi Hendrix, who regularly performed there after hours, in jams with other notable musicians. The first New York performances of the Jimi Hendrix Experience were at The Scene, on June 3 and 4, 1967, subsequent to Steve Paul seeing the band at the Monterey International Pop Festival. Other acts featured included The Velvet Underground, Pink Floyd, Jeff Beck, Traffic, Fleetwood Mac and The Chambers Brothers. Admission to the club was strictly controlled by Steve Paul, who was twenty-three years old at the time of the commencement of the club's second incarnation. Other regular attendees included photographer Linda Eastman, who later married Paul McCartney, and Tiny Tim, who often opened the sets. In 1967, The Doors played for three weeks at The Scene, their first east coast appearance, becoming the biggest draw in the history of the club. This led to an increase in their popularity in New York City, and the east coast in general. Much of the 1970 documentary Groupies was shot in and around The Scene.

The club closed on 12 July 1969. According to Sterling Morrison, of the Velvet Underground, the closure was prompted by Steve Paul's refusal to pay protection money to the New York Mafia. This resulted in fights being started at the club, placing its liquor license in jeopardy.

=== Patricia Kathleen McGlone ===
The skeleton of a woman referred to as "Midtown Jane Doe" was found by construction workers at 301 W. 46th St. in Manhattan in February, 2003. Her identity remained a mystery for 20 years, until advanced investigative forensics were applied to the case, and it was discovered that she was 16 year old Patricia Kathleen McGlone. She is said to have died in 1969, corresponding to the closing year of "Steve Paul's The Scene", and that she was married to a man associated to the location, with Detective Ryan Glas stating "At this point in the investigation, what I can say is, he does have a connection to where she was found."
