= Captured Live! =

Live album by Johnny Winter
- Released: March 1, 1976
- Recorded: September 14, 1975, Swing Auditorium, San Bernardino, California; September 18, 1975, Sports Arena, San Diego, California; September 20, 1975, Coliseum, Oakland, California
- Genre: Rock and roll
- Length: 46:00
- Label: Blue Sky
- Producer: Johnny Winter

Johnny Winter chronology
John Dawson Winter III (1974)	Captured Live! (1976)	Together (1976)

Captured Live! is a 1976 album by Johnny Winter. The performances were recorded in 1975 at three California venues: Swing Auditorium, San Diego Sports Arena and Oakland Coliseum.

== Critical reception ==
Professional ratings
Review scores
Source	Rating
AllMusic	3.5/5 stars
Rolling Stone	(Not Rated)
The Penguin Guide to Blues Recordings	3/4 stars

In a review for AllMusic, William Ruhlmann gave the album three and a half out of five stars. He notes that Winter only wrote one of the songs and added:

All the songs are basically vehicles for his guitar playing, sometimes performed in unison with [second guitarist Floyd] Radford. Winter plays fast, filling up measures with torrents of notes that must impress any guitar fan, and he earns the big cheers heard in between numbers. It's no surprise that his biggest seller is a live album [Live Johnny Winter And (1971)], and this one is another accomplished effort.

== Track listing ==
Songwriters and track running times are taken from the original Blue Sky Records LP. Other releases may have different listings.

Side 1

1. "Bony Moronie" (Larry Williams) – 6:50
2. "Roll With Me" (Rick Derringer) – 4:46
3. "Rock and Roll People" (John Lennon) – 5:39
4. "It's All Over Now" (Bobby Womack, Shirley Jean Womack) – 6:15

Side 2

1. "Highway 61 Revisited" (Bob Dylan) – 10:38
2. "Sweet Papa John" (Johnny Winter) – 12:37

== Personnel ==
Musicians

- Johnny Winter – guitar, slide guitar, vocals
- Floyd Radford – guitar
- Randy Jo Hobbs – bass guitar, background vocals
- Richard Hughes – drums
