= Sonobeat Records =

- Founded: 1967
- Founder: Bill Josey Sr., Bill Josey Jr.
- Distributor(s): Liberty Records, Liberty/United Artists Records
- Genre: Psychedelic rock, jazz, blues, country)
- Country of origin: United States
- Location: Austin, Texas
- Official website: sonobeatrecords.com

Sonobeat Records was an independent record label owned by Bill Josey Sr. and Bill Josey Jr. The father and son team created an eclectic library of hundreds of recordings of singers, musicians, and bands in Austin, Texas between the years of 1967 and 1976. Sonobeat released 24 singles, three commercial albums, and seven non-commercial promotional/demo albums on its own label. Two Sonobeat-produced albums were released nationally by Liberty Records and Liberty/United Artists Records labels.

== Album discography ==
- Lee Arlano Trio- Jazz To The Third Power (PJ-s1001, 1968)
- Winter- The Progressive Blues Experiment (R-s1002, 1968; reissue: Imperial/Liberty LP-12431; 1969; 2nd reissue: United Artists UA-LA139-F, 1973, and retitled Austin Texas) - note: "Winter" is Johnny Winter-guitar/vocal, Tommy Shannon-bass, Uncle John Turner-drums.
- Wali And The Afro Caravan- Home Lost And Found (The Natural Sound) (R-s1003, 1969; reissue: Solid State/Liberty/United Artists SS-18065, 1970)
