= Rock and Roll, Hoochie Koo =

1970 song by Rick Derringer

Song by Johnny Winter And

from the album Johnny Winter And
- Released: 1970
- Recorded: 1970
- Genre: Hard rock
- Length: 3:29
- Label: Columbia
- Songwriter: Rick Derringer
- Producers: Johnny Winter, Rick Derringer

"Rock and Roll, Hoochie Koo" is a rock song written by American musician Rick Derringer. It was first recorded in 1970 by Johnny Winter and his band Johnny Winter And, of which Derringer was a member. In 1973, Derringer recorded a solo version, which was his only top 40 chart hit as a solo artist in the US. It became a staple of 1970s classic rock radio and rock music compilations. Both Winter and Derringer have recorded multiple live versions of the song.

== Original version ==
"Rock and Roll, Hoochie Koo" was initially recorded by Johnny Winter in 1970 with his band Johnny Winter And, which included Rick Derringer and other former members of the McCoys. According to Derringer:

The first song I wrote for Johnny was 'Rock and Roll, Hoochie Koo'. 'Rock and Roll' to satisfy the rock 'n' roll that I was supposed to be bringing into the picture, and 'Hoochie Koo' to satisfy the king of blues sensibility that Johnny was supposed to maintain. And it worked out great.

However, Winter noted, "The reviewers liked it. I didn't think 'Rock and Roll, Hoochie Koo' would do as well as it did 'cause it was a little corny. Rock and Roll, Hoochie Koo. You don't ever know". The song is included on the Johnny Winter And album, which reached number 154 on the Billboard 200 album chart.

In 1970, they recorded the song during the Live Johnny Winter And tour, which was released as Live at the Fillmore East 10/3/70 in 2010. In a review of the album for AllMusic, Thom Jurek commented that "this one blows away the JWA [Johnny Winter And] studio version or Derringer's own hit single take", although he felt it did not measure up to the other songs recorded that night. Winter and Derringer later recorded the song with Winter's brother for Edgar Winter's White Trash live 1972 album Roadwork, described in an album review as a "rousing rendition".

== Rick Derringer version ==
"Rock and Roll, Hoochie Koo"

Single by Rick Derringer

from the album All American Boy
- B-side: "Time Warp (instrumental)"
- Released: 1973
- Recorded: 1973
- Studio: Caribou Ranch, Nederland, Colorado
- Genre: Hard rock, funk rock
- Length: 2:55 (single edit); 3:43 (album version)
- Label: Blue Sky
- Songwriter: Rick Derringer
- Producers: Bill Szymczyk, Rick Derringer

Rick Derringer singles chronology
"Rock and Roll, Hoochie Koo" (1973)	"Teenage Love Affair" (1974)

Audio
- "Rock and Roll, Hoochie Koo" on YouTube

Rick Derringer recorded the song for his 1973 solo debut album All American Boy. He plays guitar, bass, and tambourine and sings the lead vocal, with Bobby Caldwell on drums and Carl Hall, Lani Groves, and Tasha Thomas providing the backing vocals. The song was recorded at Caribou Ranch near Nederland, Colorado.

Edited for release as a single on Winter's Blue Sky Records, it reached number 23 on the Billboard Hot 100 chart in 1974. In Australia, the single reached number 84. In Canada, it peaked at number 11 on the RPM top single charts.

In a retrospective song review for AllMusic, Stephen Thomas Erlewine described it as:

a good, fun rock & roll song. It's not a great song, but it does make for a good record ... In the decades since, the song has dated a little bit – it now sounds like the excess of '70s hard rock, impossible to be heard outside of a '70s stadium or classic rock radio – but as that kind of recording, it's pretty fun.

Over the years Derringer recorded several live versions of "Rock and Roll, Hoochie Koo".

Derringer's version of the song was included in the soundtrack of the 1993 comedy film Dazed and Confused as well as the soundtrack of season 4 of the Netflix science-fiction horror television series Stranger Things in 2022.

=== Charts ===
==== Weekly charts ====
Chart (1974)	Peak position
US Hot 100 (Billboard)	23
Australia (Kent Music Report)	84
Canada Top Singles (RPM)	11

==== Year-end charts ====
Chart (1974)	Position
Canada (RPM)	117

== See also ==
- Hoochie coochie
