= Still Alive and Well =

1973 studio album by Johnny Winter

Studio album by Johnny Winter
- Released: March 1973
- Genre: Rock
- Length: 39.00
- Label: Columbia
- Producer: Rick Derringer

Johnny Winter chronology
Live Johnny Winter And (1971)	Still Alive and Well (1973)	Saints & Sinners (1974)

Still Alive and Well is an album by blues rock guitarist and singer Johnny Winter. It was his fifth studio album, and his first since Johnny Winter And almost three years earlier. It was released by Columbia Records in 1973.

Many of the songs on the album have a more rock-oriented power trio sound, with Randy Jo Hobbs playing bass and Richard Hughes on drums. Rick Derringer, who produced, plays guitar on three tracks. Still Alive and Well features two Rolling Stones songs—"Silver Train" and "Let It Bleed".

== Critical reception ==
Professional ratings
Review scores
Source	Rating
AllMusic	3/5 stars
Christgau's Record Guide	B+
Rolling Stone	4/5 stars
The Penguin Guide to Blues Recordings	2.5/4 stars

In Rolling Stone, Tony Glover wrote, "Yes, he is. In this long-awaited return album, Johnny Winter takes up where he left off. His fingers are fleet and sure as ever, his vocals have bite and growl, and the flash and power of yore are hanging right in there."

On AllMusic, James Chrispell said, "Still Alive and Well proved to the record-buying public that Johnny Winter was both. This is a truly enjoyable album, chock-full of great tunes played well."

Robert Christgau wrote, "Winter will never be an especially personable singer, but I like what's he's putting out on this monkey-off-my-comeback: two late-Stones covers, plenty of slide, and a good helping of nasty."

== Track listing ==
Side 1
No.	Title	Writer(s)	Length
1.	"Rock Me Baby"	Big Bill Broonzy, Arthur Crudup	3:48
2.	"Can't You Feel It"	Dan Hartman	2:54
3.	"Cheap Tequila"	Rick Derringer	4:04
4.	"All Tore Down"	Joe Crane	4:28
5.	"Rock & Roll"	Johnny Winter	4:51

Side 2
No.	Title	Writer(s)	Length
1.	"Silver Train"	Mick Jagger, Keith Richards	3:37
2.	"Ain't Nothing to Me"	Leon Payne (as Pat Patterson)	3:06
3.	"Still Alive & Well"	Derringer	3:43
4.	"Too Much Seconal"	Winter	4:20
5.	"Let It Bleed"	Jagger, Richards	4:09

Bonus tracks on remastered release
No.	Title	Writer(s)	Length
1.	"Lucille"	Richard Penniman	2:45
2.	"From a Buick 6"	Bob Dylan	2:38

"Can't You Feel It" is incorrectly listed as 5:04 on early pressings.

== Personnel ==
Musicians

- Johnny Winter – guitar, slide guitar, mandolin, vocals
- Randy Jo Hobbs – bass
- Richard Hughes – drums
- Rick Derringer – slide guitar on "Silver Train", pedal steel guitar and click guitar on "Ain't Nothing to Me", electric guitar on "Cheap Tequila"
- Jeremy Steig – flute on "Too Much Seconal"
- Todd Rundgren – Mellotron on "Cheap Tequila"
- Mark Klingman – piano on "Silver Train"

Production

- Producer: Rick Derringer
- Reissue Producer: Bob Irwin
- Digitally Remastered: Vic Anesini
- Cover Design: John Berg, Ed Lee

== Legacy ==
- New York hard rock band Circus of Power, covered and released the Derringer song "Still Alive and Well" on their 1989 live EP Still Alive....
- Austin, Texas-based singer/songwriter/guitarist Carolyn Wonderland covered "Still Alive and Well" on her 2008 album, Miss Understood.
