= Live Johnny Winter And =

Live album by Johnny Winter And
- Released: March 1971
- Recorded: Fall 1970
- Venue: Fillmore East, New York City; Pirate's World, Dania, Florida
- Genre: Rock and roll
- Label: Columbia
- Producer: Johnny Winter, Rick Derringer

Johnny Winter chronology
| Johnny Winter And (1970) | Live Johnny Winter And (1971) | Still Alive and Well (1973) |

Live Johnny Winter And is an album by Johnny Winter, recorded with his group Johnny Winter And live during the fall of 1970 at the Fillmore East in New York City and at Pirates World in Dania, Florida. It was released in March 1971.

Besides Winter, the group included guitarist Rick Derringer and bassist Randy Jo Hobbs, both former members of the McCoys, and drummer Bobby Caldwell. (Caldwell had replaced ex-McCoy Randy Zehringer after the group recorded their self-titled studio album a few months earlier).

== Background ==
Winter said it was his manager Steve Paul's idea to make a rock album. Winter recalls that "blues had kind of peaked, and Paul felt that I might not stick around if I didn't do rock ... it wasn't really what I wanted to do, but it was the right thing to do at the time".

Winter went on to say the album was his "least favorite, but it was the biggest selling album I ever had, and when I listen back on it now it makes me cringe". When asked why, Winter explained he was playing through an Ampeg SVT and "it was kind of brittle sounding", and he didn't particularly care for the sound; "there's some good playing on the album, and it wasn't a horrible record, but it's just not one of my favorites". Winter also added that there was "just too much competition" between him and Derringer, "we got in each other's way a lot".

The album was one of Winter's most successful on the album charts in the US, UK, and Canada. A single from the album, "Jumpin' Jack Flash" backed with "Good Morning Little School Girl", was his highest showing on the U.S. Hot 100 chart. In 2010, additional songs recorded during the same tour were released on Live at the Fillmore East 10/3/70.

== Critical reception ==
Professional ratings
Review scores
| Source | Rating |
|---|---|
| AllMusic | 3.5/5 stars |
| Christgau's Record Guide | B− |

In a retrospective review for AllMusic, Bruce Eder noted that, although the album was recorded during the tour to promote the group's recent studio album, it "is weighted very heavily toward Winter's covers of well-known rock & roll numbers ... But for all of the musical virtues (and obvious joy) that Winter and company bring to those standards, the most interesting cuts here are 'It's My Own Fault' and Winter's own 'Mean Town Blues'."

Robert Christgau found fault with "Mean Town Blues", however, he felt "this is what every live album ought to be and all too few are: loud, fast, raucous, and to the point". John Morthland wrote in Creem that "the medley of 'Great Balls of Fire', 'Long Tall Sally', and 'Whole Lotta Shakin' Goin' On' is Derringer's showcase. He makes it an object lesson in pacing and excitement, tightening and weaving these time-tested oldies into something brand new but still as exhilarating as the originals".

American guitarist Jim Campilongo said "the song that blows me away is 'It's My Own Fault' – a blues-rock tour-de-force that clocks in at 12 minutes and 14 seconds; every second of it is vital, spirited, and interesting ... the most obvious things on the album are the wonderful and fiery penta-tonic onslaughts of Winter, but my vote for most valuable player goes to Derringer and his rhythm playing".

== Track listing ==
Side 1
| No. | Title | Writer(s) | Length |
|---|---|---|---|
| 1. | "Good Morning Little School Girl" | Don Level, Bob Love | 4:35 |
| 2. | "It's My Own Fault" | Jules Taub, Riley King | 12:14 |
| 3. | "Jumpin' Jack Flash" | Mick Jagger, Keith Richards | 4:26 |

Side 2
| No. | Title | Writer(s) | Length |
|---|---|---|---|
| 1. | "Rock and Roll Medley": "Great Balls of Fire"; "Long Tall Sally"; "Whole Lotta Shakin' Goin' On" | Jerry Lee Lewis; Enotris Johnson, Richard Penniman, Robert Blackwell; Dave Williams, Sunny David | 6:46 |
| 2. | "Mean Town Blues" | Johnny Winter | 8:59 |
| 3. | "Johnny B. Goode" | Chuck Berry | 3:22 |

== Personnel ==
Johnny Winter And

- Johnny Winter – vocals, guitar
- Rick Derringer – vocals, guitar
- Randy Jo Hobbs – vocals, bass
- Bobby Caldwell – drums, percussion

Production

- Produced by Johnny Winter and Rick Derringer
- On-site production: Murray Krugman
- Engineering: Jim Reeves, Jim Greene, Tim Geelan, Ronnie Albert, Howie Albert, Russ Payne
- Photography: Norman Seeff
- Design: Dick Mantel, Norman Seeff

== Charts and certification ==
Live Johnny Winter And is the only Winter album to be certified by the RIAA as "Gold" (selling in excess of 500,000 copies) in the U.S. In the UK, it peaked at number 20, which was his best showing on the UK Albums Chart. It was also Winter's highest performing live album on the U.S. Billboard 200 and Canadian RPM100 album charts. A single from the album, "Jumpin' Jack Flash" backed with "Good Morning Little School Girl", reached number 89 on Billboard's Hot 100 chart and became his highest entry on the main U.S. singles chart.

1971 album charts
| Chart | Peak position | Ref(s) |
|---|---|---|
| Canada RPM 100 Albums | 48 | |
| UK Official Charts | 20 | |
| US Billboard 200 | 40 | |
