= Johnny Winter =

American blues guitarist and singer (1944–2014)

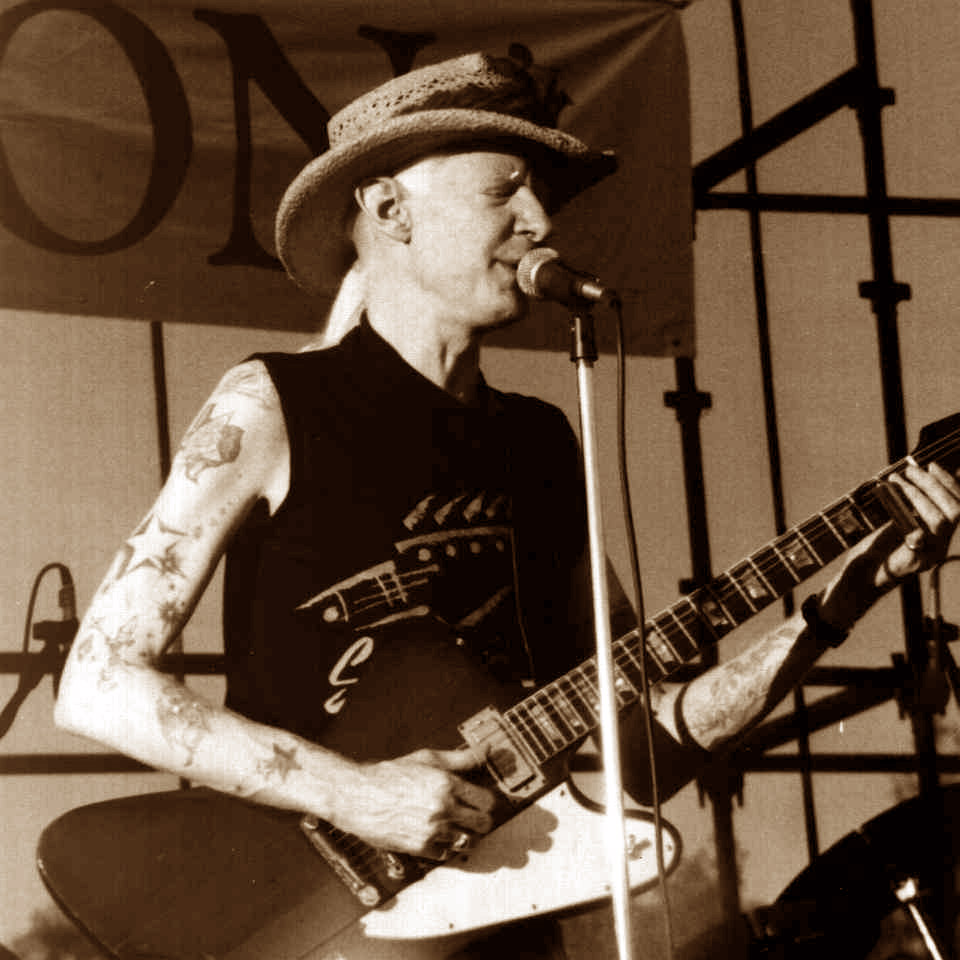
- Winter in 1990

Background information
- Born: John Dawson Winter III; February 23, 1944; Beaumont, Texas, U.S.
- Died: July 16, 2014 (aged 70) near Zürich, Switzerland
- Genres: Blues; blues rock; rock and roll; Southern rock; country blues
- Occupations: Musician; songwriter; producer
- Instruments: Guitar; vocals
- Years active: 1959–2014
- Labels: Columbia; Blue Sky; Alligator; Pointblank

John Dawson Winter III (February 23, 1944 – July 16, 2014) was an American singer, guitarist, songwriter, and record producer. Winter was known for his high-energy blues rock albums, live performances, and slide guitar playing from the late 1960s into the early 2000s. He also produced three Grammy Award–winning albums for blues singer and guitarist Muddy Waters. After his time with Waters, Winter recorded several Grammy-nominated blues albums. In 1988, he was inducted into the Blues Foundation Hall of Fame and in 2003, he was ranked 63rd in Rolling Stone magazine's list of the "100 Greatest Guitarists of All Time".

== Early life ==
Johnny Winter was born in Beaumont, Texas, on February 23, 1944. He and his younger brother Edgar Winter (born 1946) were nurtured at an early age by their parents in musical pursuits. Both were born with albinism. Their father, Leland, Mississippi native John Dawson Winter Jr. (1909–2001), was also a musician who played saxophone and guitar and sang at churches, weddings, Kiwanis and Rotary Club gatherings. Johnny and his brother began performing at an early age. When Winter was ten years old, the brothers appeared on a local children's show with Johnny playing ukulele.

== Career ==
=== Early career ===
Winter's recording career began at the age of 15, when his band Johnny and the Jammers released "School Day Blues" on Dart Records, a local Houston record label. During that same period, he was able to see performances by classic blues artists such as Muddy Waters, B.B. King, and Bobby Bland. In the early days, Winter would sometimes sit in with Roy Head and the Traits when they performed in the Beaumont area, and in 1967, Winter recorded a single with the Traits: "Tramp" backed with "Parchman Farm" (Universal Records 30496). In March 1969, his first recorded album The Progressive Blues Experiment, was released on Austin's Sonobeat Records, later reissued by Imperial after Winter's official debut on Columbia had been released.

=== Signing with Columbia Records ===
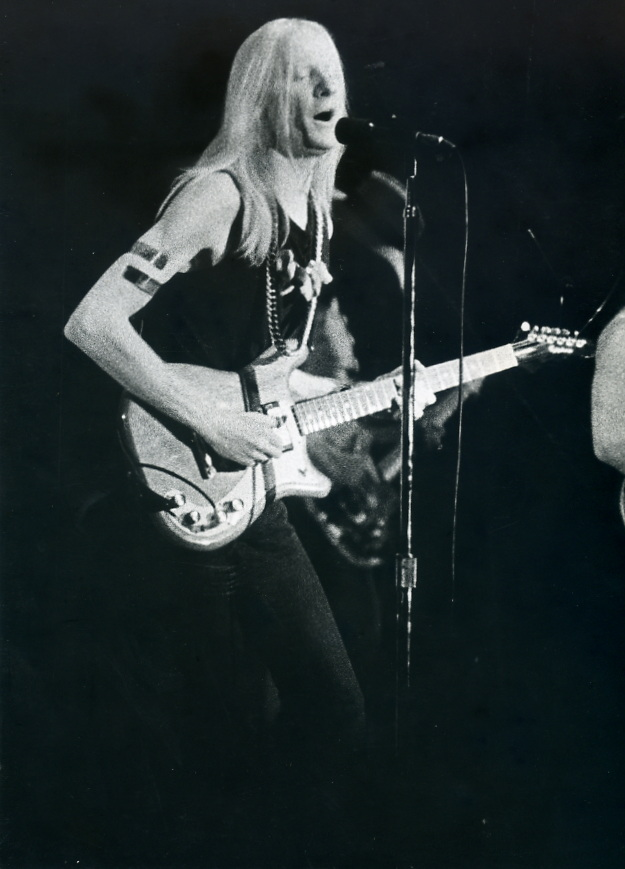
Johnny Winter, Santa Monica Civic Auditorium, 1969

Winter got his biggest break in December 1968, when Mike Bloomfield, whom he met and jammed with in Chicago, invited him to sing and play a song during a Bloomfield and Al Kooper concert at the Fillmore East in New York City. As it happened, representatives of Columbia Records (which had released the Top Ten Super Session album by Bloomfield, Kooper, and Stephen Stills) were at the concert. Winter played and sang B.B. King's "It's My Own Fault" to loud applause, and within a few days, was signed to what was reportedly the largest advance in the history of the recording industry at that time—$600,000.

Winter's first Columbia album, Johnny Winter, was recorded and released in 1969. It featured the same backing musicians with whom he had recorded The Progressive Blues Experiment, bassist Tommy Shannon and drummer Uncle John Turner, plus Edgar Winter on keyboards and saxophone on two tracks, and (for his "Mean Mistreater") Willie Dixon on upright bass and Big Walter Horton on harmonica. The album featured a few selections that became Winter signature songs, including his song "Dallas" (an acoustic blues, on which Winter played a steel-bodied, resonator guitar), John Lee "Sonny Boy" Williamson's "Good Morning Little School Girl", and B.B. King's "Be Careful with a Fool".

The album's success coincided with Imperial Records picking up The Progressive Blues Experiment for wider release. The same year, the Winter trio toured and performed at several rock festivals, including Woodstock. With brother Edgar added as a full member of the group, Winter also recorded his second album, Second Winter, in Nashville in 1969. The two-disc album only had three recorded sides (the fourth was blank). It introduced more staples of Winter's concerts, including Chuck Berry's "Johnny B. Goode" and Bob Dylan's "Highway 61 Revisited". Winter entered into a short-lived affair with Janis Joplin, which culminated at a concert at New York's Madison Square Garden, where he joined her on stage to sing and perform.

=== Unofficial albums ===
Winter was falsely rumored to have recorded with Jimi Hendrix and Jim Morrison on the 1968 Hendrix bootleg album Woke up this Morning and Found Myself Dead which was recorded at New York City's the Scene club. But according to Winter, "I never even met Jim Morrison! There's a whole album of Jimi and Jim and I'm supposedly on the album but I don't think I am 'cause I never met Jim Morrison in my life! I'm sure I never, never played with Jim Morrison at all! I don't know how that [rumor] got started."

Beginning in 1969, several Winter albums were released which were cobbled together from approximately 15 singles he recorded before signing with Columbia in 1969. There are about 30 "sides" of Winter's early career, as singles usually had two songs. Many of these songs were produced by Roy Ames, owner of Home Cooking Records/Clarity Music Publishing, who had briefly managed Winter. According to an article from the Houston Press, Winter left town for the express purpose of getting away from Ames who he considered unethical. Ames died on August 14, 2003, of natural causes at age 66. As Ames left no obvious heirs, ownership rights of the Ames master recordings remain unclear. As Winter stated in an interview when the subject of Roy Ames came up, "This guy has screwed so many people it makes me mad to even talk about him."

=== Johnny Winter And ===
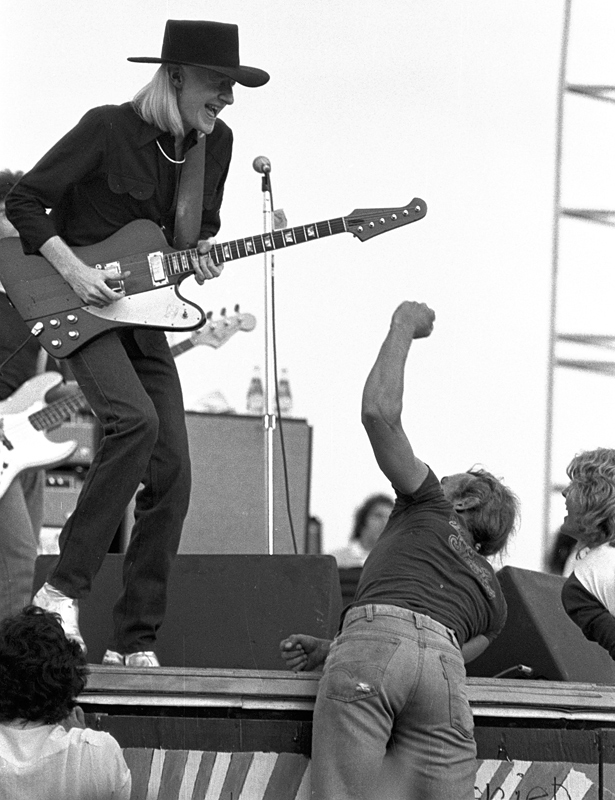
Woodstock Reunion, Parr Meadows, Yaphank, New York, 1979

In 1970, when his brother Edgar released a solo album Entrance and formed Edgar Winter's White Trash, an R&B/jazz-rock group, the original trio disbanded. Johnny Winter then formed a new band with the remnants of the McCoys—guitarist Rick Derringer, bassist Randy Jo Hobbs, and drummer Randy Z (who was Derringer's brother, their family name being Zehringer). Originally to be called "Johnny Winter and the McCoys", the name was shortened to "Johnny Winter And", which was also the name of their first album. The album included Derringer's "Rock and Roll, Hoochie Koo" and signaled a more rock-oriented direction for Winter. When Johnny Winter And began to tour, Randy Z was replaced with drummer Bobby Caldwell. Their mixture of the new rock songs with Winter's blues songs was captured on the live album Live Johnny Winter And. It included a new performance of "It's My Own Fault", the song which brought Winter to the attention of Columbia Records.

Winter's momentum was throttled when he sank into heroin addiction during the Johnny Winter And days. After he sought treatment for and recovered from the addiction, Winter was put in front of the music press by manager Steve Paul to discuss the addiction candidly. By 1973, he returned to the music scene with the release of Still Alive and Well, a basic blend of blues and hard rock, whose title track was written by Rick Derringer. His comeback concert at Long Island, New York's Nassau Coliseum featured the "And" line-up minus Rick Derringer and Bobby Caldwell. Also performing on stage was Winter's wife Susie. Saints & Sinners and John Dawson Winter III, two albums released in 1974, continue in the same direction. In 1975, Winter returned to Bogalusa, Louisiana, to produce an album for Thunderhead, a Southern rock band which included Pat Rush and Bobby "T" Torello, who would later play with Winter. A second live Winter album, Captured Live!, was released in 1976 and features an extended performance of "Highway 61 Revisited".

=== Muddy Waters sessions ===
In live performances, Winter often told the story about how, as a child, he dreamed of playing with the blues guitarist Muddy Waters. He got his chance in 1974, when blues artists came together to honor Waters, the musician responsible for bringing blues to Chicago; the resulting concert presented many blues classics and was the start of a TV series, Soundstage (this particular session was called "Blues Summit in Chicago"). And in 1977, after Waters' long-time label Chess Records went out of business, Winter brought Waters into the studio to record Hard Again for Blue Sky Records, a label set up by Winter's manager and distributed by Columbia. In addition to producing the album, Winter played guitar with Waters veteran James Cotton on harmonica. Winter produced two more studio albums for Waters, I'm Ready (with Big Walter Horton on harmonica) and King Bee and a best-selling live album Muddy "Mississippi" Waters – Live. The partnership produced three Grammy Awards for Waters and an additional Grammy for Winter's own Nothin' But the Blues, with backing by members of Waters' band. Waters told Deep Blues author Robert Palmer that Winter had done remarkable work in reproducing the sound and atmosphere of Waters's vintage Chess Records recordings of the 1950s. AllMusic writer Mark Deming noted: "Between Hard Again and The Last Waltz [1976 concert film by The Band], Waters enjoyed a major career boost, and he found himself touring again for large and enthusiastic crowds".

== Lawsuit against DC Comics ==
In 1996, Winter and his brother Edgar filed suit against DC Comics and the creators of the Jonah Hex: Riders of the Worm and Such limited series, claiming, among other things, defamation: two characters named Johnny and Edgar Autumn in the series strongly resemble the Winters. The brothers claimed the comics falsely portrayed them as "vile, depraved, stupid, cowardly, subhuman individuals who engage in wanton acts of violence, murder and bestiality for pleasure and who should be killed." The California Supreme Court sided with DC Comics, holding that the comic books were deserving of First Amendment protection.

== Later career ==
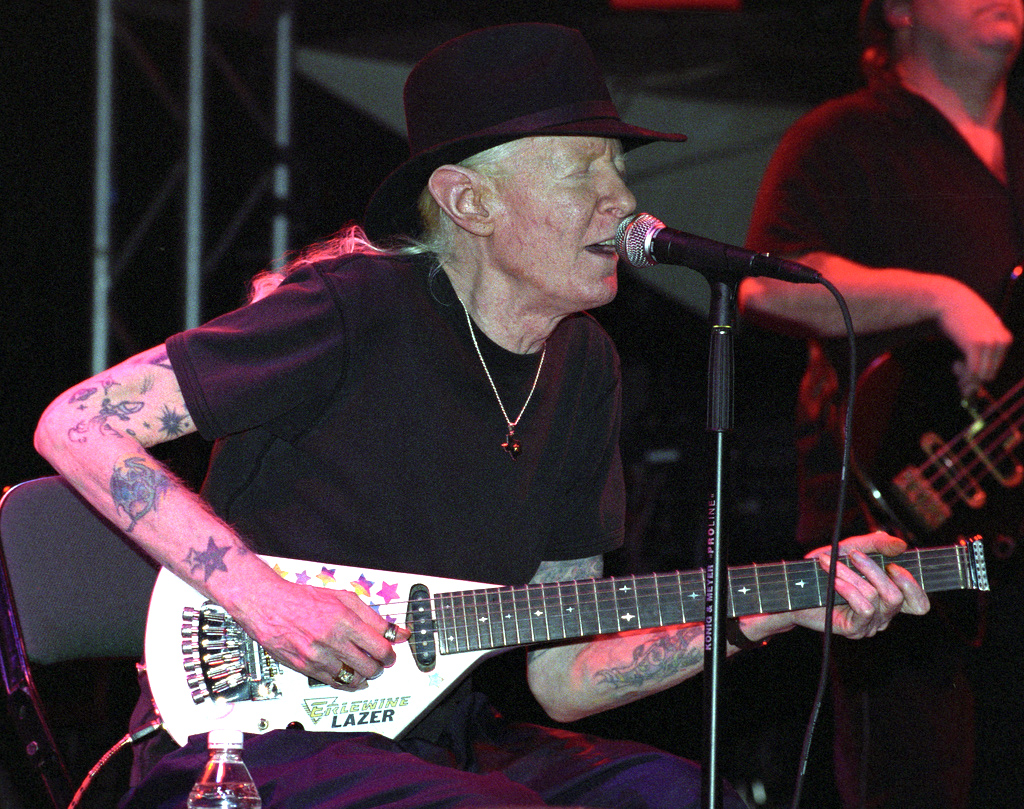
Winter in 2007

After his time with Blue Sky Records, Winter began recording for several labels, including Alligator, Pointblank, and Virgin, where he focused on blues-oriented material. In 2004, he received a Grammy Award nomination for his I'm a Bluesman album. Beginning in 2007, a series of live Winter albums titled the Live Bootleg Series and a live DVD all entered the Top 10 Billboard Blues chart. In 2009, The Woodstock Experience album was released, which includes eight songs that Winter performed at the 1969 festival. In 2011, Winter released Roots on Megaforce Records. It includes Winter's interpretation of eleven early blues and rock 'n' roll classics and features several guest artists (Vince Gill, Sonny Landreth, Susan Tedeschi, Edgar Winter, Warren Haynes, and Derek Trucks). His last studio album, Step Back (which features appearances by Joe Bonamassa, Eric Clapton, Billy Gibbons, Leslie West, Brian Setzer, Dr. John, Paul Nelson, Ben Harper and Joe Perry), was released on September 2, 2014. Nelson and Winter won a Grammy Award in the Best Blues Album category for Step Back in 2015. Nelson said Winter knew it was an award winner and Winter told him "If we don't win a Grammy for this, they're nuts."

Winter continued to perform live, including at festivals throughout North America and Europe. He headlined such prestigious events as the New Orleans Jazz & Heritage Festival, Chicago Blues Festival, the 2009 Sweden Rock Festival, the Warren Haynes Christmas Jam, and Rockpalast. He also performed with the Allman Brothers at the Beacon Theatre in New York City on the 40th anniversary of their debut. In 2007 and 2010, Winter performed at Eric Clapton's Crossroads Guitar Festivals. Two guitar instructional DVDs were produced by Cherry Lane Music and the Hal Leonard Corporation. The Gibson Guitar Company released the signature Johnny Winter Firebird guitar in a ceremony in Nashville with Slash presenting.

=== Teddy Slatus management ===
During the time Teddy Slatus was employed as Winter's manager (1984 to 2005) it has been alleged Slatus abused his power and continued to give Winter methadone to stop him from asking about getting paid. Winter could barely talk or play anymore until Paul Nelson took over his management in 2005, slowly easing him off drugs and smoking.

== Personal life and death ==
In 1993, Winter married Susan Warford, who died in 2019.

Winter was professionally active until the time of his death on July 16, 2014, near Zürich, Switzerland. He was found dead in his hotel room two days after his last performance, at the Cahors Blues Festival in France. The cause of Winter's death was not officially released. According to his guitarist friend and record producer Paul Nelson, Winter died of emphysema combined with pneumonia.

Writing in Rolling Stone magazine, after Winter's death, David Marchese said, "Winter was one of the first blues rock guitar virtuosos, releasing a string of popular and fiery albums in the late Sixties and early Seventies, becoming an arena-level concert draw in the process" ... [he] "made an iconic life for himself by playing the blues".

Winter is buried at Union Cemetery (Easton, Connecticut).

=== Recognition and legacy ===
Winter produced three Grammy Award-winning albums by Muddy Waters – Hard Again (1977), I'm Ready (1978), and Muddy "Mississippi" Waters – Live (1979). Several of Winter's own albums were nominated for Grammy Awards – Guitar Slinger (1984) and Serious Business (1985) for Best Traditional Blues Album, and Let Me In (1991) and I'm a Bluesman (2004) for Best Contemporary Blues Album. In 2015, Winter posthumously won the Grammy Award for Best Blues Album for Step Back. The album also won the 2015 Blues Music Award for Best Rock Blues Album. At the 18th Maple Blues Awards in 2015, Winter was also posthumously awarded the B.B. King International Artist of The Year Award.

In 1980, Winter was on the cover of the first issue of Guitar World. In 1988, he was inducted into the Blues Hall of Fame, the first non-African-American performer to be inducted into the Hall.

Multiple guitarists have cited Winter as an influence, including Joe Perry, Frank Marino, Michael Schenker, Adrian Smith, Alex Skolnick and Billy Corgan, whose band The Smashing Pumpkins released a song titled "Tribute to Johnny".

In her audiobook May You Live in Interesting Times: A Memoir (2021), comedian and founding Saturday Night Live cast member Laraine Newman recounts losing her virginity to Winter at the age of 17 in the late 1960s.

In 2008, Winter appeared alongside brother Edgar in the documentary film American Music: Off the Record directed by Benjamin Meade.

== Guitars and picking style ==
Winter played a variety of guitars during his career, but he is probably best known for his use of Gibson Firebirds. He owned several, but favored a 1963 Firebird V model. Winter explained:

I still have all six of them ... but that first one [1963] I ever bought is my favorite because I've played it so long and I've gotten used to it. They all sound different, but that one sounds the best. The neck is nice and thin ... there's nothing it can't do. It's a great guitar.

The original Firebird was a departure from Gibson's traditional configuration, with Firebird "sidewinder" pickups in place of the company's standard sized PAF humbucker or P-90 single-coil pickup models. Later Firebirds used a different (non-sidewinder) design, which may account for Winter's preference for the 1963. Firebird pickups were still different from Gibson's Mini-Humbuckers, but the terminology is often incorrectly mixed. Firebird pickups, by nature of their design, are brighter than Mini-Humbuckers. In a 2014 interview, Winter described the tone:

The Firebird is the best of all worlds. It feels like a Gibson, but it sounds closer to a Fender than most other Gibsons. I was never a big fan of humbucking pickups, but the mini humbuckers on the Firebird have more bite and treble.

In 2008, the Gibson Custom Shop issued a signature Johnny Winter Firebird V in a ceremony in Nashville with Slash presenting.

In 1984, luthier Mark Erlewine approached Winter with his Lazer electric guitar. With its unusual design (for the time) without a headstock and having a small body, Winter responded immediately: "the first day I plugged it in, it sounded so good that I wanted to use it for a gig that night." He commented:

[The Lazer is] the closest thing I've found to sounding like a Strat and feeling like a Gibson ... Lazer is a bit easier to play than the Firebird. The action is high, but the strings pull easier ... But I still use the Firebird on slide songs; the slide still sounds better on the Firebird.

Other guitars that Winter owned and played include a Gibson ES-125 (his first electric guitar), a Fender Stratocaster, a Gibson Les Paul/SG Custom, a Fender Mustang, a Gibson Les Paul Goldtop with P-90 pickups, a Gibson Flying V, an Epiphone Wilshire, a Gibson Black Beauty, a Fender Electric XII (strung with only 6 strings), and an acoustic National Resonator.

Winter played with a thumb pick and his fingers. His picking style was inspired by Chet Atkins and Merle Travis and he never used a flat pick. Winter preferred a plastic thumb pick sold by Gibson and a steel pinky slide, later marketed by Dunlop.

== Discography ==
Studio albums

- The Progressive Blues Experiment (Sonobeat 1968, reissued by Imperial/UA 1969)
- Johnny Winter (Columbia 1969)
- Second Winter (Columbia 1969)
- Johnny Winter And (Columbia 1970)
- Still Alive and Well (Columbia 1973)
- Saints & Sinners (Columbia 1974)
- John Dawson Winter III (Columbia 1974)
- Nothin' but the Blues (Blue Sky 1977)
- White, Hot and Blue (Blue Sky 1978)
- Raisin' Cain (Blue Sky 1980)
- Guitar Slinger (Alligator 1984)
- Serious Business (Alligator 1985)
- Third Degree (Alligator 1986)
- The Winter of '88 (Voyager/MCA 1988)
- Let Me In (Pointblank/Virgin 1991)
- Hey, Where's Your Brother? (Pointblank/Virgin 1992)
- I'm a Bluesman (Virgin America 2004)
- Roots (Megaforce 2011)
- Step Back (Megaforce 2014)

Live albums

- Live Johnny Winter And (Columbia 1971)
- Captured Live! (Blue Sky 1976)
- Together (Blue Sky 1976) – with Edgar Winter
- Live in NYC '97 (Pointblank/Virgin 1998)
- The Woodstock Experience (Sony/Legacy 2009)
- Live at the Fillmore East 10/3/70 (Collectors' Choice 2010)
