= White, Hot and Blue =

1978 studio album by Johnny Winter

Studio album by Johnny Winter
- Released: August 1978
- Recorded: The Schoolhouse
- Genre: Blues
- Length: 36:10
- Label: Blue Sky
- Producer: Johnny Winter

Johnny Winter chronology
Nothin' but the Blues (1977)	White, Hot and Blue (1978)	Raisin' Cain (1980)

White, Hot and Blue is a 1978 album by Johnny Winter. Following on from the previous year's Nothin' but the Blues, it again focuses on blues music but moves back to Winter's traditional formula of mixing original tracks, of which there are three, with cover versions.

== Background ==
At the time, Winter had frequently collaborated with Muddy Waters's band on Waters's albums Hard Again (1977) and I'm Ready (1978), as well as on his own album Nothin' but the Blues (1977). However, for this album, the band lineup was completely renewed. Second guitarist Pat Rush met Winter while playing in the band Thunderhead and later joined Winter's band during the tour in support of Nothin' but the Blues.

In 1993, the album was released on CD for the first time in the world by Sony Music Entertainment Japan. In September 2007, a reissue combining the previous album Nothin' but the Blues and this album on a single CD was released by BGO Records.

== Critical reception ==
Professional ratings
Review scores
Source	Rating
AllMusic	3.5/5 stars
Christgau's Record Guide	B−
Rolling Stone	(Not rated)

William Ruhlmann of AllMusic awarded the album 3.5 out of 5 stars, commenting that "the ferocious performances heard on Waters's albums are carried over here as well," and noting that while Taj Mahal's "E.Z. Rider" is rendered as Rolling Stones–style rock, the rest of the album is more firmly rooted in the blues.

== Track listing ==
1. "Walkin' by Myself" (James A. Lane a.k.a. Jimmy Rogers) - 3.28
2. "Slidin' In" (Johnny Winter) - 5.04
3. "Divin' Duck Blues" (Sleepy John Estes) - 3.27
4. "One Step at a Time" (Johnny Winter) - 3.58
5. "Nickel Blues" (Johnny Winter) - 3.33
6. "E.Z. Rider" (Traditional) - 4.00
7. "Last Night" (Walter Jacobs) - 5.35
8. "Messin' with the Kid" (Mel London) - 2.53
9. "Honest I Do" (Jimmy Reed) - 4.12

== Personnel ==
- Johnny Winter - guitar, harmonica, vocals
- Edgar Winter - keyboards, saxophone, vocals
- Bobby Torello - drums
- Isaac Payton Sweat - bass
- Pat Rush - guitar
- Pat Ramsey - harmonica
- Tom Brock - mandolin
