= Second Winter =

1969 studio album by Johnny Winter

Studio album by Johnny Winter
- Released: October 27, 1969
- Recorded: July 19–22 and August 8–12, 1969; Nashville, Tennessee
- Genre: Blues rock; psychedelic rock
- Length: 47:03
- Label: Columbia
- Producer: Johnny Winter

Johnny Winter chronology
Johnny Winter (1969)	Second Winter (1969)	Johnny Winter And (1970)

Professional ratings
Review scores
Source	Rating
AllMusic	4.5/5 stars
Rolling Stone	(favorable)
Music Box	4/5 stars
The Penguin Guide to Blues Recordings	3/4 stars

Second Winter is the third studio album by Texas blues guitarist Johnny Winter, released in 1969. The original plan was to edit the songs from the recording session into one album but it was later thought that all the recordings were good enough to be released. The album was released as a "three-sided" LP, with a blank fourth side on the original vinyl. Two more songs, "Tell the Truth" and "Early in the Morning" were left unfinished but included on a 2004 re-release of the album.

== Background ==
The original LP was released as a double album, but side D contained no tracks, while side A included three songs and sides B and C each contained four songs. According to Winter himself, this format was chosen due to a technical limitation because all 11 tracks could not fit on a single record without reducing the volume level. When released on CD, all tracks were compiled onto a single disc.

In Winter's home country of the United States, the album did not achieve a Top 40 position on the Billboard chart following his previous album Johnny Winter (1969). However, the album entered the UK Albums Chart, reaching a peak position of number 59.

The 2004 Legacy Edition included two previously unreleased tracks as bonus material on disc one along with a bonus disc titled Live at the Royal Albert Hall, featuring live recordings from a concert held on April 17, 1970. This bonus disc also contains an early version of "Frankenstein" which would later be released by Edgar Winter with his own group.

== Track listing ==
Side one
No.	Title	Writer(s)	Length
1.	"Memory Pain"	Percy Mayfield	5:27
2.	"I'm Not Sure"	Johnny Winter	5:18
3.	"The Good Love"	Dennis Collins	4:38

Side two
No.	Title	Writer(s)	Length
1.	"Slippin' and Slidin'"	Eddie Bocage, Al Collins, Little Richard, James Smith	2:43
2.	"Miss Ann"	Enotris Johnson, Little Richard	3:04
3.	"Johnny B. Goode"	Chuck Berry	3.45
4.	"Highway 61 Revisited"	Bob Dylan	5:07

Side three
No.	Title	Writer(s)	Length
1.	"I Love Everybody"	Johnny Winter	3:50
2.	"Hustled Down in Texas"	Johnny Winter	3:31
3.	"I Hate Everybody"	Johnny Winter	2:35
4.	"Fast Life Rider"	Johnny Winter	7:05
5.	"Early In the Morning" (Legacy Bonus Track)	Dallas Bartley, Leo Hickman, Louis Jordan	3:49
6.	"Tell the Truth" (Legacy Bonus Track)	Lowman Pauling	4:30

Legacy Edition Bonus Disc Live at Royal Albert Hall 04-17-70
No.	Title	Writer(s)	Length
1.	"Help Me"	Ralph Bass, Sonny Boy Williamson II, Willie Dixon	4:49
2.	"Johnny B. Goode"	Chuck Berry	3:41
3.	"Mama, Talk To Your Daughter"	A Atkins, J. B. Lenoir	5:16
4.	"It's My Own Fault"	B. B. King, Jules Taub	12:00
5.	"Black Cat Bone"	Johnny Winter	5:38
6.	"Mean Town Blues"	Johnny Winter	11:13
7.	"Tobacco Road"	John D. Loudermilk	11:05
8.	"Frankenstein"	Edgar Winter	9:11
9.	"Tell the Truth"	Lowman Pauling	9:08

== Personnel ==
Musicians

- Johnny Winter – guitar, mandolin, vocals
- Edgar Winter – piano, organ, harpsichord, alto saxophone, vocals
- "Uncle" John Turner – percussion
- Tommy Shannon – bass
- Dennis Collins – bass on "The Good Love"

Production

- Johnny Winter – producer
- Edgar Winter – production consultant
- Steve Paul – spiritual producer
- Ed Kollis – engineer
- Tony Lane – album design
- Richard Avedon – cover photography
