= Rick Derringer =

American rock musician (1947–2025)

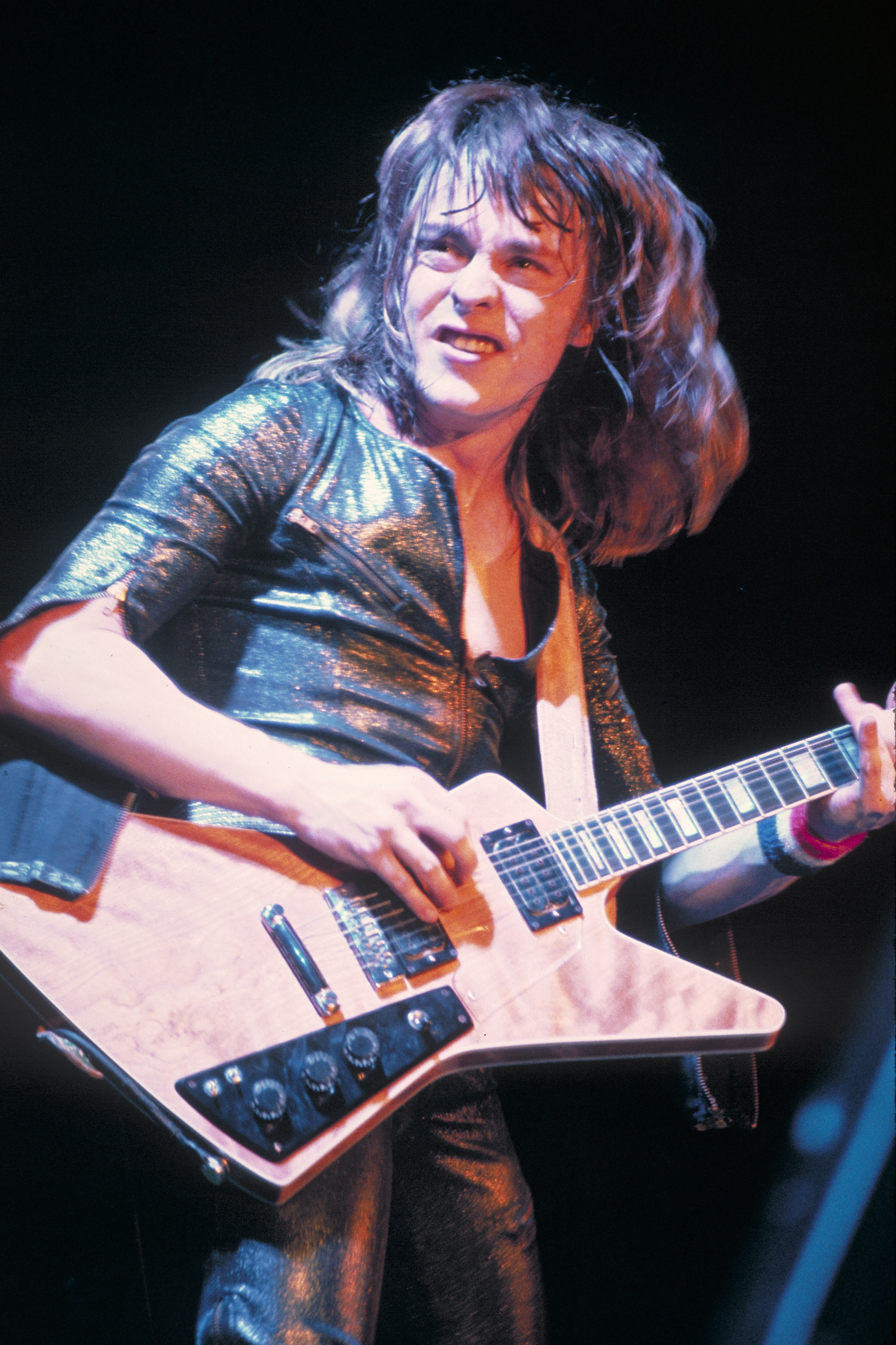
- Derringer in 1974

Background information
- Born: Richard Dean Zehringer; August 5, 1947; Celina, Ohio, U.S.
- Died: May 26, 2025 (aged 77) Ormond Beach, Florida, U.S.
- Genres: Hard rock; blues rock; pop rock
- Occupation: Musician; songwriter; producer
- Instruments: Guitar; vocals
- Years active: 1965–2025
- Formerly of: The McCoys
- Website: rickderringer.com

Richard Dean Zehringer (August 5, 1947 – May 26, 2025), known professionally as Rick Derringer, was an American guitarist, singer, and songwriter. He gained success in the 1960s with his band, the McCoys. Their debut single, "Hang On Sloopy", became a number-one hit in 1965 and is regarded as a classic track from the garage rock era. The McCoys had seven songs chart in the top 100, including covers of "Fever" and "Come On, Let's Go". After releasing All American Boy, Derringer established a career as a solo artist.

In 1973, Derringer found further success with his song "Rock and Roll, Hoochie Koo". He worked extensively with brothers Edgar and Johnny Winter, playing lead and rhythm guitar in their bands and producing all of their gold and platinum records, including Edgar Winter's hits "Frankenstein" and "Free Ride" (both in 1973). He collaborated with Steely Dan, Cyndi Lauper, and "Weird Al" Yankovic, producing Yankovic's Grammy Award-winning songs "Eat It" (1984) and "Fat" (1988). He produced the World Wrestling Federation's album The Wrestling Album (1985) and its follow-up, Piledriver: The Wrestling Album II (1987). Those albums featured Hulk Hogan's entrance song, "Real American”, initially the theme song of the tag team U.S. Express; and the Demolition tag team's theme, "Demolition." Derringer produced three songs on the soundtrack of the 1984 Tom Hanks film Bachelor Party.

== Life and career ==
=== Early life and 1960s ===
Derringer was born in Celina, Ohio, on August 5, 1947, and grew up in Fort Recovery, Ohio. He was the son of John Otto Zehringer and Janice Lavine (Thornburg) Zehringer. His father was a section foreman on the Nickel Plate Railroad. According to Derringer, aside from his parents' extensive record collection, his first major influence was his uncle Jim Thornburg, who was a popular guitarist and singer in Ohio. Derringer recalled hearing him play guitar in the kitchen of his parents' home and knowing immediately that he wanted to learn the instrument. He was eight years old at the time, and his parents gave him his first electric guitar for his ninth birthday. Inspired by the "British invasion" of the Beatles and other UK bands in the mid-1960s, Rick and his brother Randy began playing music together. After he finished the eighth grade, the family moved to Union City, Indiana, where Derringer formed a band he called the McCoys. He renamed the band the Rick Z Combo and then Rick and the Raiders before reverting to the original name.

In the summer of 1965, before Derringer turned 18, the McCoys were hired to back a New York-based band called the Strangeloves in concert. The Strangeloves, record producers from New York City, were looking for a band to record the song "My Girl Sloopy", written by Wes Farrell and Bert Berns, and chose the McCoys. Derringer persuaded the producers to change the title to "Hang On Sloopy". The Strangeloves recorded the guitar and instrumental parts and the McCoys were brought into the studio to sing on the recording, which was released under their name in 1965 and reached number one on the Hot 100. Barry McGuire's "Eve of Destruction" fell from number one to number two; The Beatles' "Yesterday" zoomed from number 45 to number three.

"Hang On Sloopy" became an anthem for Derringer's home state of Ohio, especially at Ohio State Buckeyes football games, where fans chant "O-H-I-O" during the song's chorus. It is also a staple at Cleveland Guardians home games at Progressive Field and plays at the end of every tour at Ohio Caverns.

Along with musicians, Elliott Randall, Marty Kupersmith, Harvey Brooks, Paul Harris, and Billy Williams, Derringer played on Eric Mercury's 1969 Electric Black Man album.

=== 1970s ===
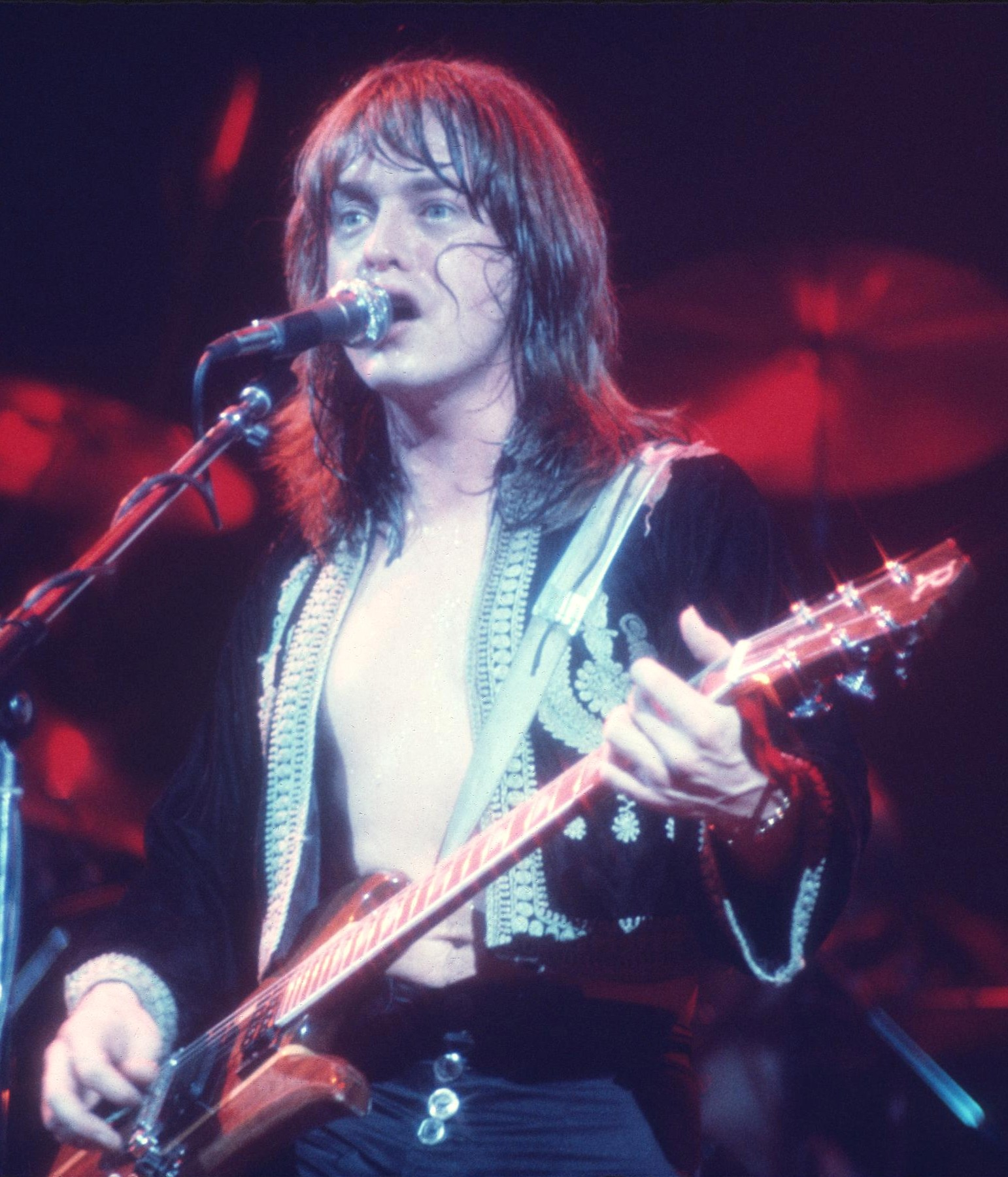
Derringer performing at New Haven Coliseum in 1977

Derringer and the McCoys joined Johnny Winter in a group called "Johnny Winter And", with the "And" referring to the McCoys. Derringer later became part of Edgar Winter's White Trash and the Edgar Winter Group. After the McCoys split up, Derringer played guitar on albums by, among others, Steely Dan, Alice Cooper, Bette Midler and Barbra Streisand.

In 1973, Derringer released his first solo album, All American Boy, which featured his hit song "Rock and Roll, Hoochie Koo". The song had already appeared on the albums Johnny Winter And (1970) and Roadwork (1972). Derringer's version reached the Top 25 on the Billboard Hot 100 chart, becoming his highest-charting single, but despite the single's success the album, All American Boy, was not commercially successful. One critic called it a "sadly neglected album of great merit".

Derringer's later albums, both solo and with his band Derringer, included 1977's Sweet Evil, co-written with Cynthia Weil and Rolling Thunder Revue author Larry Sloman. He released the critically acclaimed album Guitars and Women in 1979, which was re-released with liner notes by Razor & Tie in 1998. He played guitar on two Steely Dan tracks, "Show Biz Kids" on Countdown to Ecstasy (1973) and "Chain Lightning" on Katy Lied (1975), and is credited with having helped Donald Fagen to secure a record deal in 1972. Derringer collaborated with his neighbor Todd Rundgren, playing on four of Rundgren's solo albums. He was a regular in Andy Warhol's circle and frequently visited Warhol's studio, The Factory.

=== 1980s and 1990s ===
Derringer played guitar on "My Rival" from Steely Dan's Gaucho (1980) and contributed to Fagen's first solo album, The Nightfly (1982). In 1983, he played guitar on two hit power ballads written and produced by Jim Steinman: Air Supply's "Making Love Out of Nothing at All" and Bonnie Tyler's "Total Eclipse of the Heart". Derringer said his guitar solo in "Making Love Out of Nothing at All" was his favorite of all the solos he had recorded. That year, he recorded guitar parts for Meat Loaf's poorly received album Midnight at the Lost and Found. Both "Making Love Out of Nothing at All" and "Total Eclipse of the Heart" were originally offered to Meat Loaf by Steinman for that album, but Meat Loaf's record company refused to pay Steinman for the compositions.

In 1983, Derringer wrote "Shake Me" for his Good Dirty Fun solo album, accompanied by a video produced by Jake Hooker, the husband of Lorna Luft. Singer Lourett Russell Grant appeared in the video alongside Derringer. In 1984, Derringer played guitar on Barbra Streisand's cover of Steinman's "Left in the Dark", released as the lead single from her album Emotion. In 1985, Derringer's friendship with Cyndi Lauper led him and Steinman to collaborate again, with Derringer producing The Wrestling Album (1985) for the World Wrestling Federation, consisting mostly of wrestlers' theme songs. He wrote several songs for the album, including "Real American", co-written with Bernard Kenny. The song was originally used as the theme song for U.S. Express (Barry Windham and Mike Rotunda), but became Hulk Hogan's theme song after Windham left the World Wrestling Federation in 1985. The song was used by US President Barack Obama at the 2011 White House Correspondents' Dinner, where he played it while unveiling his birth certificate. It was used as a campaign song by Hillary Clinton, as a victory song by Newt Gingrich, and in four videos during the campaign of Donald Trump.

In 1986, Derringer worked with Meat Loaf again on Blind Before I Stop, co-writing the song "Masculine". He played guitar on two songs on Cyndi Lauper's album True Colors, "Calm Inside the Storm" and "The Faraway Nearby". From 1986 to 1992, he served as a guitarist on Lauper's tours and commented that Lauper was "better live" than Barbra Streisand. He played with Lauper again on her third album, A Night to Remember, which was released in 1989.

In 1987, Meat Loaf appeared on Way Off Broadway, a nationally distributed cable TV show with Derringer as the music director. The show was hosted by Joy Behar. Other guests on the show included Larry Carlton, Robbie Dupree, and Edgar Winter. Derringer returned to the World Wrestling Federation in 1987 to produce a second music album, Piledriver: The Wrestling Album II. He co-wrote the theme song for Demolition and recorded a new version of "Rock and Roll, Hoochie Koo" as a duet with Gene Okerlund.

In the 1980s, he produced the Kodomo Band and toured in Asia, including with Edgar Winter, during the 1990 White Light tour, and worked for several New York City-based jingle houses. Derringer produced "Weird Al" Yankovic's debut album, "Weird Al" Yankovic (1983). Between 1983 and 1989, he produced six Yankovic albums, for which he received his only Grammy Award. Yankovic expressed openness to the idea of working with Derringer again.

In 1997, Derringer became an Evangelical Christian. Thereafter, he consistently aligned himself with conservative causes in the United States. He described himself as a "Jesus freak" and recorded albums of Christian songs with his third wife, Jenda.

=== 2000s and 2010s ===
In 2001, Derringer, Tim Bogert, and Carmine Appice released the album Derringer, Bogert & Appice (DBA): Doin' Business as... on the German record label Steamhammer Records. Derringer had previously worked with Appice on an album, Party Tested by DNA (Derringer'n'Appice), and it was re-released in 2011.

In 2001, Derringer, his wife and their children released the first two of four Christian music albums through Panda Studio Productions: Aiming 4 Heaven (2001), Derringer X 2 (2001), the holiday album Winter Wonderland (2004), and We Live (2008). In 2002, Derringer was featured in Dan Muise's book Gallagher, Marriott, Derringer & Trower – Their Lives and Music. In 2002 he released Free Ride Smooth Jazz, which included his smooth jazz radio hit remake "Jazzy Koo".

In May 2009, he self-released the album Knighted by the Blues and its popular song, "Sometimes", co-written with Jenda. Derringer followed up with the release of The Three Kings of the Blues (Freddie King, B.B. King, Albert King) on Mike Varney's Blues Bureau International Records.

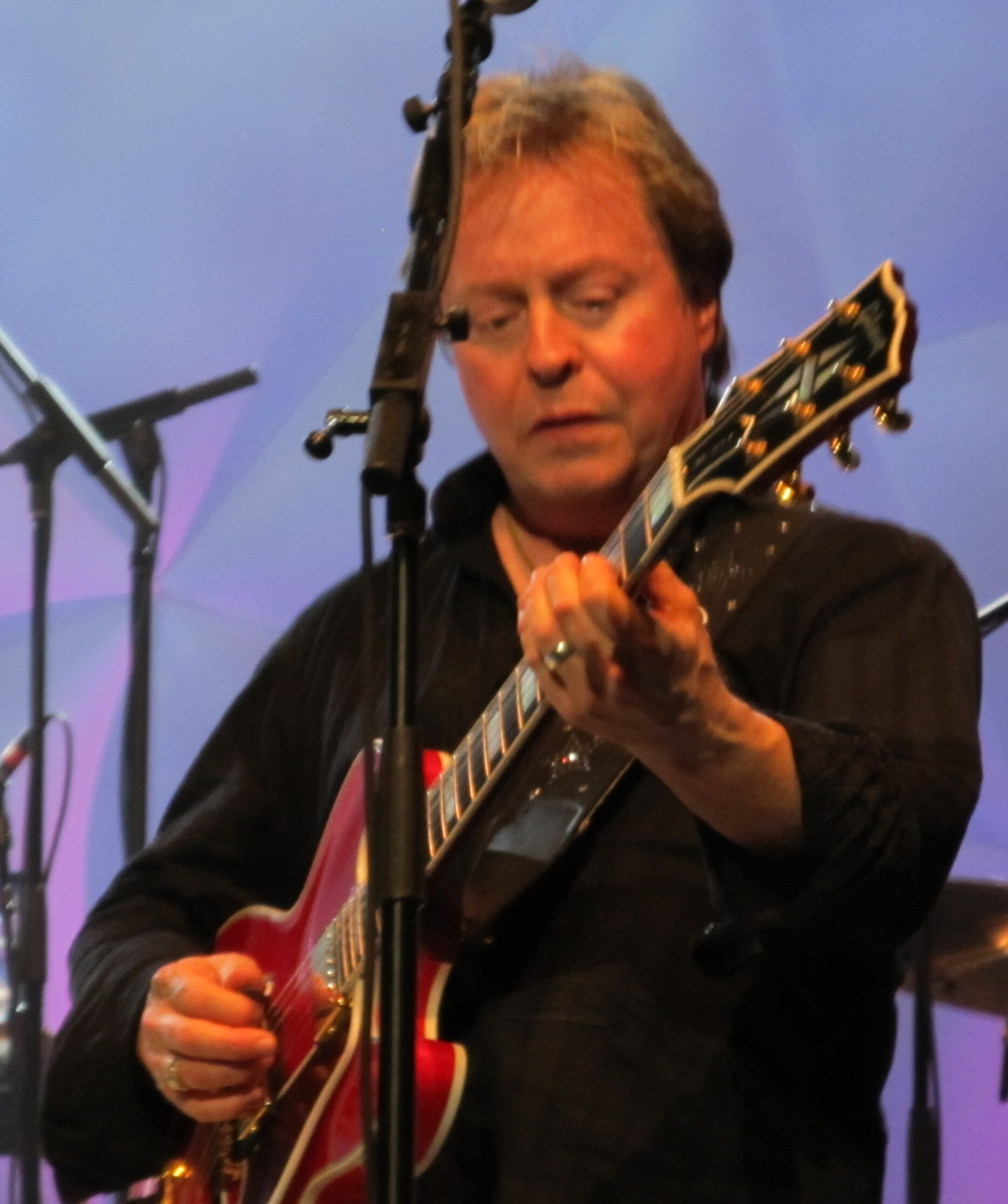
Derringer playing with Ringo Starr's All-Starr Band in Paris, June 2011

Derringer went on three world tours with Ringo Starr & His All-Starr Band. For one, rehearsals began in June 2010 and they traveled across Europe, Russia, South America, Mexico and the USA. The tour featured Wally Palmar, Edgar Winter, Gary Wright, Richard Page, and Gregg Bissonette. Derringer played with Paul McCartney in a performance at New York's Radio City to celebrate Starr's 70th birthday.

In 2013, Derringer and Jenda created the Asia Project after she discovered that the two largest-selling songs in history were Chinese. As Ricky Wu and Jenda Tu, the Derringers recorded and released their versions of the songs: Wang Qiwen and Yang Chengang's 2004 song "Mouse Loves Rice" and the actress Liu Shi Shi's "Season of Waiting".

In 2014, Derringer performed on Peter Frampton's Guitar Circus tour with other notable guitarists, including B.B. King, Roger McGuinn (ex-Byrds), Don Felder (ex-Eagles), Leslie West (ex-Mountain), Cheap Trick's Rick Nielsen, Toto's Steve Lukather, Los Lobos' David Hidalgo, and Pearl Jam's Mike McCready.

In 2017, Derringer was charged with carrying a loaded gun on a Delta Air Lines flight from Cancún in Mexico to Atlanta, Georgia. According to his manager, Derringer believed he was permitted to carry the gun due to his possession of a valid Florida concealed weapon permit. Derringer later pleaded guilty, agreeing to pay a $1,000 fine.

In 2017, Derringer re-recorded Hulk Hogan's theme, "Real American", with updated lyrics. The re-recorded version was released on May 28, 2017. To debut and promote the re-recording, Derringer appeared on Infowars. Changes to the lyrics include "I gotta be a man, I can't let it slide" changed to "I gotta lend a hand, I can't let it slide" and "fight for the right of every man" changed to "fight for the rights of everyone". The lines "Best not mess with my US" and "Ours is a cause that's right and just, we're built on truth, in God we trust" were also added to the second verse. In 2017, Derringer collaborated with baseball players Tom Seaver and Gary Redus to release a version of "Take Me Out to the Ball Game", honoring his lifelong love of baseball. In 2018 he toured with Vanilla Fudge, Mitch Ryder and Badfinger under the name "HippieFest". Derringer performed the guitar solo for an anti-bullying campaign version of "Hang on Sloopy" by the Love Love Kids, released in October 2019.

== Personal life ==
Derringer married Liz Agriss in 1969, a writer whom he met when she was working for Andy Warhol. The marriage ended in divorce. Later he married Dyan Buckelew and they had one daughter. The marriage also ended in divorce. His third wife was Jenda.

In 2017, Derringer appeared on Alex Jones's Infowars several times. In one of those appearances, political consultant Roger Stone interviewed him about his support for Donald Trump.

== Death ==
Derringer died in Ormond Beach, Florida on May 26, 2025, at the age of 77. According to TMZ, Derringer's wife Jenda said he "died peacefully after being taken off life support Monday night following a medical episode". His caretaker and close friend, Tony Wilson, said Derringer had undergone a triple bypass two months earlier but had been doing well.

== Discography ==
=== Rick Derringer ===
Studio albums

- All American Boy (1973) – US No. 25, AUS No. 38
- Spring Fever (1975) – US No. 141
- Guitars and Women (1979, re-released 1998)
- Face to Face (1980)
- Good Dirty Fun (1983)
- Back to the Blues (1993)
- Electra Blues (1994)
- Tend the Fire (1997)
- Blues Deluxe (1998)
- Jackhammer Blues (2000)
- Free Ride (2002)
- Rockin' American (2007)
- Knighted by the Blues (2009)
- The Three Kings of the Blues (2010)
- High City (2014)

Live albums

- King Biscuit Flower Hour, Rick Derringer & Friends (1998)
- Live in Japan (1998)

Compilation albums

- Rock and Roll Hoochie Koo: The Best of Rick Derringer (1996)
- Collection: The Blues Bureau Years (2006)
- Joy Ride: Solo Albums 1973–1980 (2017)
- Complete Blue Sky Albums: 1976–1978 (2017)

=== Edgar Winter's White Trash ===
- Edgar Winter's White Trash (1971) – With Johnny Winter
- Roadwork (1972)

=== Edgar Winter ===
- Jasmine Nightdreams (1975) – With Johnny Winter

=== Johnny and Edgar Winter ===
- Together (1976)

=== Dick Glass Featuring Rick Derringer and the McCoys ===
- The Glass Derringer (1976)

=== With Edgar Winter, Ian Hunter, Dr. John, Lorna Luft, Hall and Oates ===
- Live at Cheney Hall (2006)
- Rock Spectacular: Live at the Ritz 1982 (2010)

=== The McCoys ===
– Formed in 1965 by Richard Zehringer on guitar and vocals, Dennis Kelly on bass (who would be replaced by Randy Jo Hobbs) and Randy Zehringer on drums.

- Hang On Sloopy (1965)
- You Make Me Feel So Good (1966)
- Infinite McCoys (1968)
- Human Ball (1969)

=== Johnny Winter And ===
- Johnny Winter And (1970)
- Live Johnny Winter And (1971)

=== The Edgar Winter Group ===
- They Only Come Out at Night (1972) – Epic
- Shock Treatment (1974) – Epic
- The Edgar Winter Group with Rick Derringer (1975) – Epic
- The Edgar Winter Group with Rick Derringer – Live in Japan (1990) – Cypress

=== Derringer ===
Studio albums

- 1976: Derringer
- 1977: Sweet Evil
- 1978: If I Weren't So Romantic I'd Shoot You – Dan Hartman plays piano, organ, and rhythm guitar on 6 songs.

Live albums

- 1976: Live in Cleveland
- 1977: Derringer Live

Compilation

- 1996: Required Rocking

=== DNA ===
(duo project with Carmine Appice)

- 1983: Party Tested

=== Derringer, Bogert & Appice ===
(trio with Tim Bogert and Carmine Appice)

- 2001: Doin' Business As...

=== The Derringers ===
- Not to be confused with the Derringer group, this band, The Derringers, was a family project bringing together Rick Derringer himself, his wife Brenda Jean, and their two children towards religious music. Four albums were produced under this name:*
- 2001: Aiming 4 Heaven
- 2001: Derringer X 2
- 2004: Winter Wonderland
- 2008: We Live

=== Collaborations ===
- Alarm Clock by Richie Havens (1970) – Guitar
- Countdown to Ecstasy by Steely Dan (1973) – Slide guitar on Show Biz Kids
- Thomas Jefferson Kaye by Thomas Jefferson Kaye (1973) – Acoustic and electric guitar
- Still Alive and Well by Johnny Winter (1973) – Guitar on Cheap Tequila and Still Alive and Well; slide guitar on Silver Train; pedal steel on Ain't Nothing to Me
- First Grade by Thomas Jefferson Kaye (1974) – Acoustic, electric, and slide guitar
- Katy Lied by Steely Dan (1975) – Solo on Chain Lightning
- Images by Dan Hartman (1976) – Rhythm guitar and solo on Thank You for the Good Times
- Songs for the New Depression by Bette Midler (1976) – Pedal steel on Let Me Just Follow Behind
- Gaucho by Steely Dan (1980) – Guitar on My Rival
- Schwartz by Eddie Schwartz (1980) – Guitar
- Connections by Richie Havens (1980) – Guitar
- The Nightfly by Donald Fagen (1982) – Guitar
- Eye to Eye by Eye to Eye (1982) – Guitar
- Lick It Up by Kiss (1983) – Guitar solo on Exciter
- Faster Than the Speed of Night by Bonnie Tyler (1983) – Guitar
- Emotion by Barbra Streisand (1984) – Guitar
- Public Life by Eddie Schwartz (1984) – Solo guitar
- Come See About Me by Neil Sedaka (1984) – Guitar on Cathy's Clown
- True Colors by Cyndi Lauper (1986) – Guitar on Calm Inside the Storm and The Faraway Nearby
- Zazu by Rosie Vela (1986) – Guitar
- Blind to Reason by Grayson Hugh (1988) – Electric guitar on Romantic Heart, Tears of Love, and Empty as the Wind
- A Night to Remember by Cyndi Lauper (1989) – Guitar
- A New Day Yesterday by Joe Bonamassa (2000) – Vocals and guitar solo on Nuthin' I Wouldn't Do (For a Woman Like You)
- Winter Blues by Edgar Winter (2009) – Rhythm guitar on New Millennium and On the Tip of My Tongue; guitar on White Man's Blues
- 10x10 by Ronnie Montrose (2017) – Guitar on "Love Is An Art" with Edgar Winter
- Myles Goodwyn and Friends of the Blues by Myles Goodwyn (2018) - guitar solo on "Last Time I'll Ever Sing The Blues"
- 1000 Hands: Chapter One by Jon Anderson (2019) – Guitar
