= Johnny Winter And =

1970 studio album by Johnny Winter

Studio album by Johnny Winter
- Released: September 1970
- Recorded: June 9, 1970, New York City
- Genre: Hard rock
- Length: 41:36
- Label: Columbia
- Producer: Johnny Winter and Rick Derringer

Johnny Winter chronology
Second Winter (1969)	Johnny Winter And (1970)	Live Johnny Winter And (1971)

Professional ratings
Review scores
Source	Rating
Allmusic	4.5/5 stars
Christgau's Record Guide	B+
Rolling Stone	favorable

Johnny Winter And is the fourth studio album by Texas blues guitarist Johnny Winter, released in 1970. Besides Winter, the group included guitarist Rick Derringer, bassist Randy Jo Hobbs and drummer Randy Zehringer, all former members of the McCoys. This was the first album released with Rick Derringer as a sideman. It was also the name of his band for a short time.

September 12, 2018, Sony Japan released a 13-song remastered version with 2 bonus cuts.

== Track listing ==
1. "Guess I'll Go Away" (Johnny Winter) (3:28)
2. "Ain't That a Kindness" (Mark Klingman) (3:29)
3. "No Time to Live" (Jim Capaldi, Steve Winwood) (4:36)
4. "Rock and Roll, Hoochie Koo" (Rick Derringer) (3:31)
5. "Am I Here?" (Randy Zehringer) (3:24)
6. "Look Up" (Derringer) (3:34)
7. "Prodigal Son" (Winter) (4:18)
8. "On the Limb" (Derringer) (3:36)
9. "Let the Music Play" (Allan Nicholls, Otis Stephens) (3:15)
10. "Nothing Left" (Winter) (3:30)
11. "Funky Music" (Derringer) (4:55)

2018 Remastered Reissue with Bonus Tracks

12. "Guess I'll Go Away" (Live) (4:40)
13. "Rock and Roll, Hoochie Koo" (Live) (4:56)

== Personnel ==
Johnny Winter And

- Johnny Winter – vocals, guitar
- Rick Derringer – vocals, guitar
- Randy Jo Hobbs – vocals, bass
- Randy Zehringer – drums

Production

- Produced by Johnny Winter and Rick Derringer
- Production assistants: Roy Segal, Edgar Winter
- Engineering: Roy Segal
- Photography: Norman Seeff
- Design: Lloyd Ziff
