= Randy Jo Hobbs =

American bassist (1948–1993)

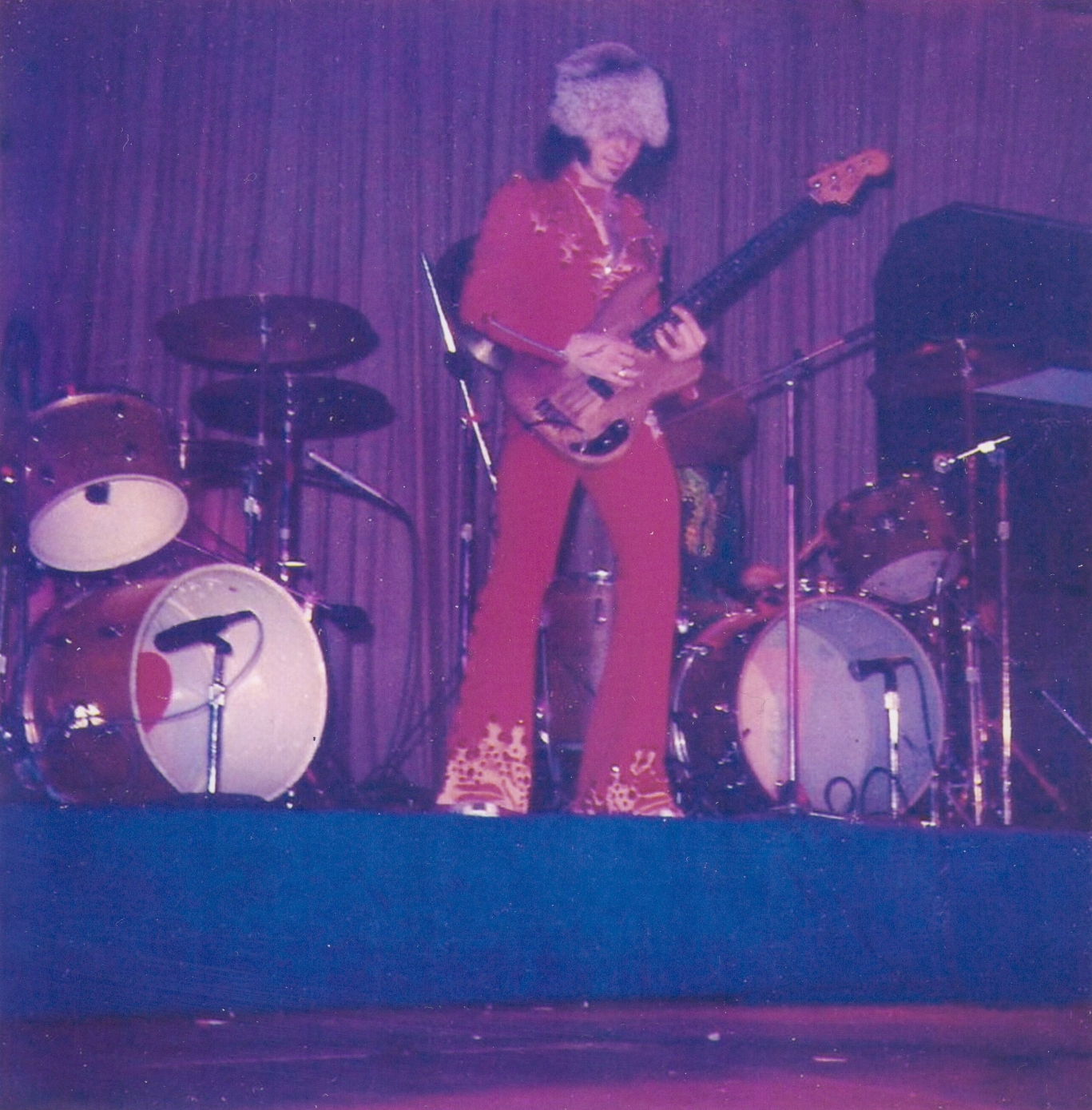
- Hobbs in 1973

Background information
- Born: March 22, 1948; Winchester, Indiana, U.S.
- Died: August 5, 1993 (aged 45) Dayton, Ohio, U.S.
- Occupation: Musician
- Instrument: Bass guitar
- Formerly of: The McCoys; Johnny Winter; Edgar Winter; Montrose

Randy Jo Hobbs (March 22, 1948 – August 5, 1993) was an American musician. He played bass for The McCoys during the 1965–1969 period and in the bands of the brothers Edgar Winter and Johnny Winter during 1970–1976.

== Career ==
Hobbs played bass with Jimi Hendrix on some 1968 live sessions which were later released unofficially as Woke Up This Morning and Found Myself Dead (1980) and New York Sessions (1998), and officially as Bleeding Heart (1994). He joined up with a later version of Montrose, appearing on the Jump on It album, released in 1976. That same year, Hobbs also played bass on Rick Derringer's album with Dick Glass, Glass Derringer.

== Death ==
Hobbs was found dead of heart failure due to drug-related complications, aged 45, in a hotel room in Dayton, Ohio, in 1993.
