= The Rolling Stones 1964 tours =

The Rolling Stones had six concert tours in 1964.

== Personnel ==
- Mick Jagger – lead vocals, harmonica
- Keith Richards – guitar, backing vocals
- Brian Jones – guitar, harmonica, backing vocals
- Bill Wyman – bass guitar, backing vocals
- Charlie Watts – drums, percussion

== 1st British tour ==
1st British tour 1964
- Tour by The Rolling Stones
- Start date: 6 January 1964
- End date: 27 January 1964
- Legs: 1
- No. of shows: 28

The Rolling Stones concert chronology
- British Tour 1963; 1st British tour 1964; 2nd British tour 1964

The Rolling Stones' first British tour was a concert tour. The tour commenced on 6 January and concluded on 27 January 1964.

=== 1st British tour dates ===
| Date | City | Country | Venue |
|---|---|---|---|
| 6 January 1964; 2 shows | Harrow | England | Granada Theatre |
| 7 January 1964; 2 shows | Slough | England | Adelphi Theatre |
| 8 January 1964; 2 shows | Maidstone | England | Granada Theatre |
| 9 January 1964; 2 shows | Kettering | England | Granada Theatre |
| 10 January 1964; 2 shows | Walthamstow | England | Granada Theatre |
| 12 January 1964; 2 shows | Tooting | England | Granada Theatre |
| 14 January 1964; 2 shows | Mansfield | England | Granada Theatre |
| 15 January 1964; 2 shows | Bedford | England | Granada Theatre |
| 19 January 1964; 2 shows | Coventry | England | Coventry Theatre |
| 20 January 1964; 2 shows | Woolwich | England | Granada Theatre |
| 21 January 1964; 2 shows | Aylesbury | England | Granada Theatre without Brian Jones |
| 22 January 1964; 2 shows | Shrewsbury | England | Granada Theatre |
| 26 January 1964; 2 shows | Leicester | England | De Montfort Hall |
| 27 January 1964; 2 shows | Bristol | England | Colston Hall |

== 2nd British tour ==
2nd British tour 1964
- Tour by The Rolling Stones
- Start date: 8 February 1964
- End date: 7 March 1964
- Legs: 1
- No. of shows: 58

The Rolling Stones concert chronology
- 1st British tour 1964; 2nd British tour 1964; 1st American tour 1964

The Rolling Stones' 2nd British tour was a concert tour. The tour commenced on 8 February and concluded on 7 March 1964.

=== 2nd British tour dates ===
| Date | City | Country | Venue |
|---|---|---|---|
| 8 February 1964; 2 shows | Edmonton | England | Regal Cinema |
| 9 February 1964; 2 shows | Leicester | England | De Montfort Hall |
| 10 February 1964; 2 shows | Cheltenham | England | Odeon Theatre |
| 11 February 1964; 2 shows | Rugby | England | Granada Theatre |
| 12 February 1964; 2 shows | Guildford | England | Odeon Theatre |
| 13 February 1964; 2 shows | Kingston upon Thames | England | Granada Theatre |
| 14 February 1964; 2 shows | Watford | England | Gaumont State Cinema |
| 15 February 1964; 2 shows | Rochester | England | Odeon Theatre |
| 16 February 1964; 2 shows | Portsmouth | England | Portsmouth Guildhall |
| 17 February 1964; 2 shows | Greenford | England | Granada Theatre |
| 18 February 1964; 2 shows | Colchester | England | Rank Theatre |
| 19 February 1964; 2 shows | Stockton-on-Tees | England | Rank Theatre |
| 20 February 1964; 2 shows | Sunderland | England | Rank Theatre |
| 21 February 1964; 2 shows | Hanley | England | Gaumont Theatre |
| 22 February 1964; 2 shows | Bournemouth | England | Bournemouth Winter Gardens |
| 23 February 1964; 2 shows | Birmingham | England | Birmingham Hippodrome |
| 24 February 1964; 2 shows | Southend-on-Sea | England | Odeon Theatre |
| 25 February 1964; 2 shows | Romford | England | Odeon Theatre |
| 26 February 1964; 2 shows | York | England | Rialto Theatre |
| 27 February 1964; 2 shows | Sheffield | England | Sheffield City Hall |
| 28 February 1964; 2 shows | Cardiff | Wales | Sophia Gardens |
| 29 February 1964; 2 shows | Brighton | England | Hippodrome |
| 1 March 1964; 2 shows | Liverpool | England | Liverpool Empire Theatre |
| 2 March 1964; 2 shows | Nottingham | England | Albert Hall |
| 3 March 1964; 2 shows | Blackpool | England | Opera House Theatre |
| 4 March 1964; 2 shows | Bradford | England | Gaumont Theatre |
| 5 March 1964; 2 shows | Blackburn | England | Odeon Theatre |
| 6 March 1964; 2 shows | Wolverhampton | England | Gaumont Theatre |
| 7 March 1964; 2 shows | Morecambe | England | Morecambe Winter Gardens |
| 13 May 1964; 2 shows | Newcastle | England | City Hall |
| 14 May 1964; 2 shows | Bradford | England | St George's Hall |
| 24 May 1964; 2 shows | Coventry | England | Theatre |
| 25 May 1964; 2 shows | East Ham | England | Granada |
| 26 May 1964; 2 shows | Birmingham | England | Town Hall |
| 27 May 1964; 2 shows | Cannock | England | Danilo |
| 28 May 1964; 2 shows | Stockport | England | Essoldo |
| 29 May 1964; 2 shows | Sheffield | England | City Hall |
| 30 May 1964; 2 shows | Slough | England | Adelphi |

== 1st American tour ==
1st American tour 1964
- Tour by The Rolling Stones
- Associated album: The Rolling Stones
- Start date: 5 June 1964
- End date: 20 June 1964
- Legs: 1
- No. of shows: 12

The Rolling Stones concert chronology
- 2nd British tour 1964; 1st American tour 1964; 3rd British tour 1964

The Rolling Stones' 1st American tour was the band's first concert tour of America. The tour commenced on 5 June and concluded on 20 June 1964. On this tour, the band supported their first U.S. album The Rolling Stones.

=== 1st American tour dates ===
| Date | City | Venue |
|---|---|---|
| 5 June 1964 | San Bernardino, California | Swing Auditorium, Orange Show Fairground |
| 6 and 7 June 1964; 2 shows each day | San Antonio, Texas | Teen Fair of Texas, Joe Freeman Coliseum, San Antonio Teen Fair of Texas (Producers Robert "Bob" Coffen and Charles Coffen) |
| 12 June 1964 | Excelsior, Minnesota | Big Reggie's Ballroom, Excelsior Amusement Park |
| 13 June 1964 | Omaha, Nebraska | Omaha Civic Auditorium |
| 14 June 1964 | Detroit, Michigan | Olympia Stadium |
| 17 June 1964 | Pittsburgh, Pennsylvania | West View Park |
| 18 June 1964 | Syracuse, New York | Onondaga County War Memorial |
| 19 June 1964 | Harrisburg, Pennsylvania | Pennsylvania Farm Show Complex & Expo Center |
| 20 June 1964; 2 shows | New York City | Carnegie Hall |

On 31 July 1964 the Rolling Stones played their first ever two dates in Ireland ... the first in Dublin, and the second, on their way home via Belfast International Airport, in Ballymena (the Flamingo Ballroom) where they played for S.D.Barr with the Cossacks Showband. They appeared that evening at 12.30 a.m. to a packed house. It was a warm up for their 3rd British tour and a taster for their first Irish tour the next year.

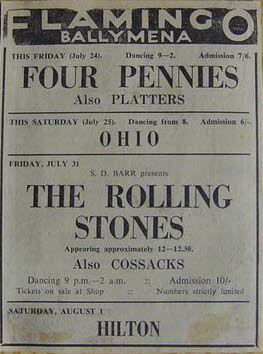

== 3rd British tour ==
3rd British tour 1964
- Tour by The Rolling Stones
- Start date: 1 August 1964
- End date: 22 August 1964
- Legs: 1
- No. of shows: 11

The Rolling Stones concert chronology
- 1st American tour 1964; 3rd British tour 1964; 4th British tour 1964

The Rolling Stones' 3rd British tour was a concert tour by the band. The tour commenced on 1 August and concluded on 22 August 1964. It concluded with concerts in the Channel Islands and included a single concert in the Netherlands, which was cut short after a few songs due to rowdy fans, who rioted with the police after the Stones had gone off the stage.

=== 3rd British tour dates ===
| Date | City | Country | Venue |
|---|---|---|---|
| 1 August 1964 | Hastings | England | Hastings Pier |
| 2 August 1964 | Warminster | England | Longleat |
| 7 August 1964 | Richmond upon Thames | England | Athletic Ground |
| 8 August 1964 | Scheveningen | Netherlands | Kurhaus, Kurzaal |
| 9 August 1964 | Manchester | England | New Elizabethan Ballroom |
| 10 August 1964 | New Brighton | England | New Brighton Tower |
| 13 August 1964 | Douglas | Isle of Man | Palace Ballroom |
| 18 August 1964 | Saint Peter Port | Guernsey | New Theatre Ballroom, Guernsey |
| 19 August 1964 | Saint Peter Port | Guernsey | New Theatre Ballroom, Guernsey |
| 20 August 1964 | Saint Peter Port | Guernsey | New Theatre Ballroom, Guernsey |
| 21 August 1964 | Saint Helier | Jersey | Springfield Hall, Jersey |
| 22 August 1964 | Saint Helier | Jersey | Springfield Hall, Jersey |

== 4th British tour ==
4th British tour 1964
- Tour by The Rolling Stones
- Start date: 5 September 1964
- End date: 11 October 1964
- Legs: 1
- No. of shows: 64

The Rolling Stones concert chronology
- 3rd British tour 1964; 4th British tour 1964; 2nd American tour 1964

The Rolling Stones' 4th British tour was a concert tour by the band. The tour commenced on 5 September and concluded on 11 October 1964.

=== 4th British tour dates ===
| Date | City | Country | Venue |
|---|---|---|---|
| 5 September 1964; 2 shows | Finsbury Park, London | England | Astoria Theatre |
| 6 September 1964; 2 shows | Leicester | England | Odeon Theatre |
| 8 September 1964; 2 shows | Colchester | England | Odeon Theatre |
| 9 September 1964; 2 shows | Luton | England | Odeon Theatre |
| 10 September 1964; 2 shows | Cheltenham | England | Odeon Theatre |
| 11 September 1964; 2 shows | Cardiff | Wales | Capitol Theatre |
| 13 September 1964; 2 shows | Liverpool | England | Liverpool Empire Theatre |
| 14 September 1964; 2 shows | Chester | England | ABC Theatre |
| 15 September 1964; 2 shows | Manchester | England | Odeon Theatre |
| 16 September 1964; 2 shows | Wigan | England | ABC Theatre |
| 17 September 1964; 2 shows | Carlisle | England | ABC Theatre |
| 18 September 1964; 2 shows | Newcastle upon Tyne | England | Odeon Theatre |
| 19 September 1964; 2 shows | Edinburgh | Scotland | Usher Hall |
| 20 September 1964; 2 shows | Stockton-on-Tees | England | ABC Theatre |
| 21 September 1964; 2 shows | Kingston upon Hull | England | ABC Theatre |
| 22 September 1964; 2 shows | Lincoln | England | ABC Theatre |
| 24 September 1964; 2 shows | Doncaster | England | Gaumont Theatre |
| 25 September 1964; 2 shows | Hanley | England | Gaumont Theatre |
| 26 September 1964; 2 shows | Bradford | England | Gaumont Theatre |
| 27 September 1964; 2 shows | Birmingham | England | Birmingham Hippodrome |
| 28 September 1964; 2 shows | Romford | England | Odeon Theatre |
| 29 September 1964; 2 shows | Guildford | England | Odeon Theatre |
| 1 October 1964; 2 shows | Bristol | England | Colston Hall |
| 2 October 1964; 2 shows | Exeter | England | Odeon Theatre |
| 3 October 1964; 2 shows | London | England | Edmonton, Regal Theatre |
| 4 October 1964; 2 shows | Southampton | England | Gaumont Theatre |
| 5 October 1964; 2 shows | Wolverhampton | England | Gaumont Theatre |
| 6 October 1964; 2 shows | Watford | England | Gaumont Theatre |
| 8 October 1964; 2 shows | London | England | Lewisham, Odeon Theatre |
| 9 October 1964; 2 shows | Ipswich | England | Gaumont Theatre |
| 10 October 1964; 2 shows | Southend-on-Sea | England | Odeon Theatre |
| 11 October 1964; 2 shows | Brighton | England | Hippodrome |

== 2nd American tour ==
2nd American tour 1964
- Tour by The Rolling Stones
- Associated album: 12 × 5
- Start date: 24 October 1964
- End date: 15 November 1964
- Legs: 1
- No. of shows: 11

The Rolling Stones concert chronology
- 4th British tour 1964; 2nd American tour 1964; Irish tour 1965

The Rolling Stones' 2nd American tour was a concert tour by the band. The tour commenced on 24 October 1964 and concluded on 15 November 1964. On this tour, the band supported their album 12 × 5.

=== 2nd American tour dates ===
| Date | City | Venue |
|---|---|---|
| 24 October 1964 | New York City, New York | Academy of Music (2 shows) |
| 26 October 1964 | Sacramento, California | Memorial Auditorium |
| 31 October 1964 | San Bernardino, California | Swing Auditorium |
| 1 November 1964 | Long Beach, California | Civic Auditorium |
| 1 November 1964 | San Diego, California | Balboa Park Bowl |
| 3 November 1964 | Cleveland, Ohio | Public Hall |
| 4 November 1964 | Providence, Rhode Island | Loews Theater |
| 11 November 1964 | Milwaukee, Wisconsin | Milwaukee Theatre (without Brian Jones) |
| 12 November 1964 | Fort Wayne, Indiana | War Memorial Coliseum (without Brian Jones) |
| 13 November 1964 | Dayton, Ohio | Hara Arena (without Brian Jones) |
| 14 November 1964 | Louisville, Kentucky | Memorial Auditorium (2 shows) (without Brian Jones) |
| 15 November 1964 | Chicago | Arie Crown Theater |
