= List of the Rolling Stones concert tours =

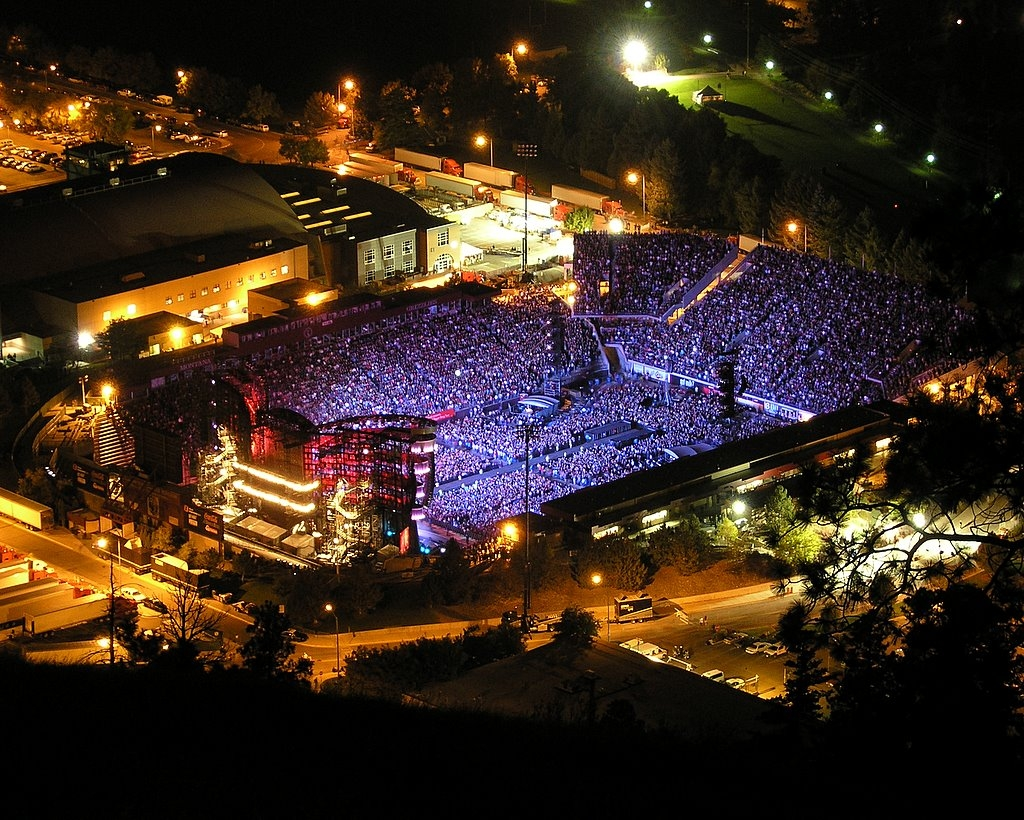
The Rolling Stones concert at Washington–Grizzly Stadium in Missoula, Montana on 4 October 2006

Since forming in 1962, the English rock band the Rolling Stones have performed more than two thousand concerts around the world, becoming one of the world's most popular live music attractions in the process. The Stones' first tour in their home country was in September 1963 and their first American tour began in June 1964. In their early years of performing, the band would undertake numerous short tours of the United Kingdom and North America, playing in small- and medium-size venues to audiences composed largely of screaming girls. As time moved on, their audience base expanded (in terms of both size and diversity) and they would increasingly favour larger arenas and stadiums. For many years, the group would choose to play in their native country along with Continental Europe and North America on a three-year rotating cycle.

Many audio recordings exist of Rolling Stones concerts, both official and unofficial. Seventeen official concert albums (eighteen in the United States) have been released by the band, six of which were previously unreleased concert recordings released from 2011 to 2012, including the highly bootlegged Brussels Affair. Several of their concerts have also been filmed and released under a variety of titles, such as The Stones in the Park which records the band's performance at Hyde Park in 1969 on the festival of the same name.

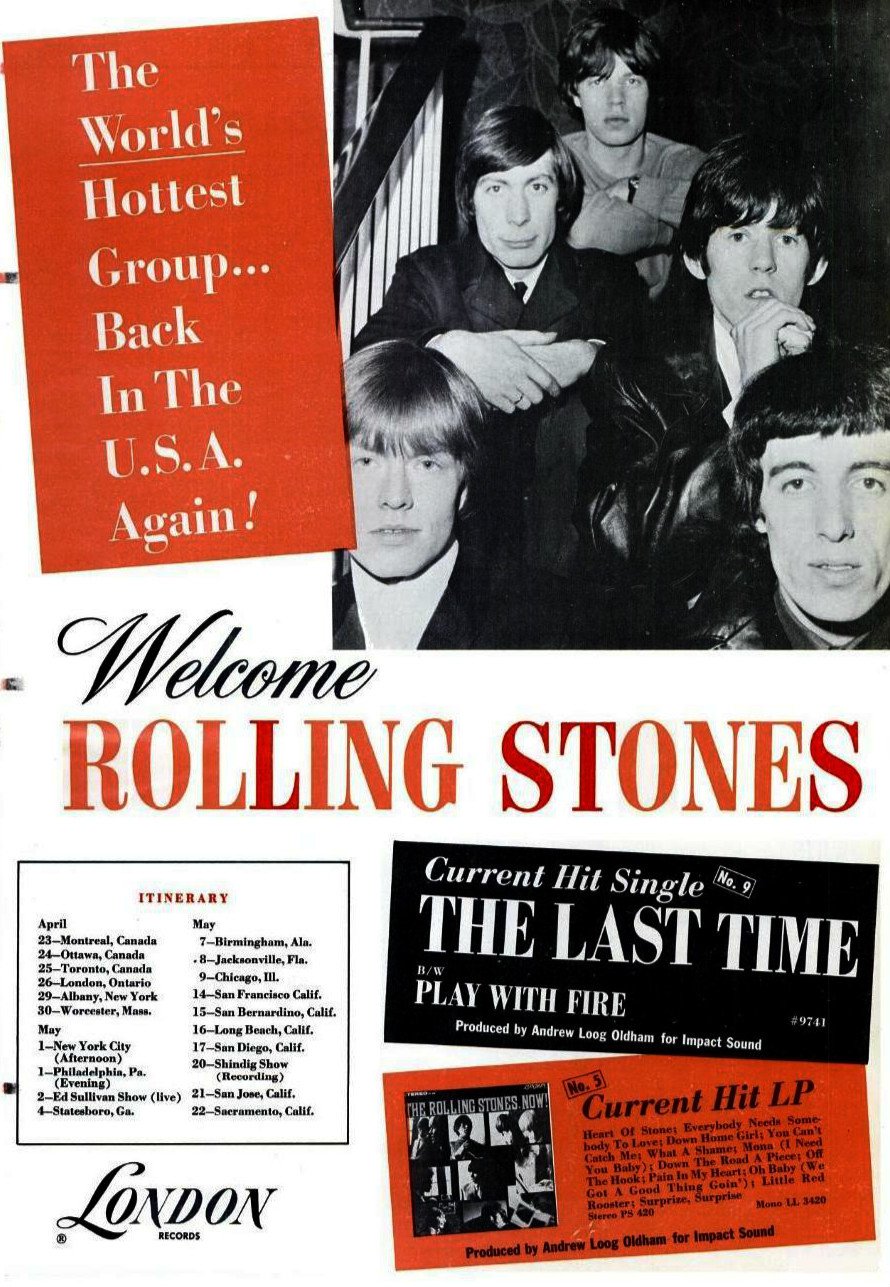
Advertisement for their 1st American Tour 1965

The most famous and heavily documented of all the band's concerts was the Altamont Free Concert at the Altamont Speedway in 1969, the final show of their American Tour 1969. For this concert, the biker gang Hells Angels provided security, which resulted in a fan, Meredith Hunter, being stabbed and beaten to death by the Angels after he drew a firearm. Part of the tour and the Altamont concert were documented in Albert and David Maysles' film Gimme Shelter. As a response to the growing popularity of bootleg recordings, the album Get Yer Ya-Ya's Out! (UK 1; US 6) was released in 1970; it was declared by critic Lester Bangs to be the best live album ever.

The biggest concert the band gave was in front of 1,3 million people in Rio de Janeiro, Brazil, in 2006 as part of the A Bigger Bang Tour. The second largest was in 2016, when the band played for the first time in Cuba, during their América Latina Olé tour. An estimated 500 000 fans, more than half of the population of Havana, saw the Rolling Stones whose music had been banned by the Cuban regime until only nine years before the concert. A live album and film, The Rolling Stones: Havana Moon, were released in 2016.

== Concert tour chronology ==
In bold, the tours which, when completed, became the highest-grossing of all time. (Note: The Rolling Stones' 12 July 1962 debut show 14-song setlist was as follows: Kansas City (Wilbert Harrison cover); Honey What's Wrong (Bully Fury cover); Confessin' The Blues (Chuck Berry cover); Bright Lights, Big City (Jimmy Reed cover); Dusty My Blues (Elmore James cover); Down The Road Apiece (Chuck Berry cover); I Wanna Love You (Charles Smith cover), I'm Your Hoochie Coochie Man (Muddy Waters cover); Back in the U.S.A. (Chuck Berry cover); Kind of Lonesome (Jimmy Reed cover); Blues Before Sunrise (Elmore James cover); Big Boss Man (Jimmy Reed cover); Don't Stay Out All Night (Billy Boy Arnold cover); Happy Home (Elmore James cover). The line-up was: Mick, Keith, Brian, Stu, and Dick, but no drummer.)

| Year | Title | Date | Associated album(s) | Continent(s) | Shows |
|---|---|---|---|---|---|
| 1963 | British Tour 1963 | 29 September 1963 – 3 November 1963 | —N/a | Europe | 60 |
| 1964 | 1st British Tour 1964 | 6 January 1964 – 27 January 1964 | —N/a | Europe | 28 |
| 1964 | 2nd British Tour 1964 | 8 February 1964 – 7 March 1964 | —N/a | Europe | 58 |
| 1964 | 1st American Tour 1964 | 5 June 1964 – 20 June 1964 | The Rolling Stones | North America | 11 |
| 1964 | 3rd British Tour 1964 | 1 August 1964 – 22 August 1964 | The Rolling Stones | Europe | 11 |
| 1964 | 4th British Tour 1964 | 5 September 1964 – 11 October 1964 | The Rolling Stones | Europe | 64 |
| 1964 | 2nd American Tour 1964 | 24 October 1964 – 11 November 1964 | 12 × 5 | North America | 11 |
| 1965 | Irish Tour 1965 | 6 January 1965 – 8 January 1965 | The Rolling Stones No. 2 | Europe | 6 |
| 1965 | Far East Tour 1965 | 22 January 1965 – 16 February 1965 | The Rolling Stones No. 2 | Oceania; Asia | 36 |
| 1965 | 1st British Tour 1965 | 5 March 1965 – 18 March 1965 | The Rolling Stones No. 2 | Europe | 28 |
| 1965 | 1st European Tour 1965 | 26 March 1965 – 2 April 1965 | The Rolling Stones No. 2 | Europe | 11 |
| 1965 | 2nd European Tour 1965 | 16 April 1965 – 18 April 1965 | The Rolling Stones No. 2 | Europe | 3 |
| 1965 | 1st American Tour 1965 | 23 April 1965 – 29 May 1965 | The Rolling Stones, Now! | North America | 22 |
| 1965 | 3rd European Tour 1965 | 15 June 1965 – 29 June 1965 | —N/a | Europe | 15 |
| 1965 | 2nd Irish Tour 1965 | 3 September 1965 – 4 September 1965 | —N/a | Europe | 2 |
| 1965 | 4th European Tour 1965 | 11 September 1965 – 17 September 1965 | —N/a | Europe | 11 |
| 1965 | 2nd British Tour 1965 | 24 September 1965 – 17 October 1965 | —N/a | Europe | 48 |
| 1965 | 2nd American Tour 1965 | 29 October 1965 – 5 December 1965 | Out of Our Heads | North America | 41 |
| 1966 | Australasian Tour 1966 | 18 February 1966 – 1 March 1966 | —N/a | Oceania | 18 |
| 1966 | European Tour 1966 | 26 March 1966 – 5 April 1966 | —N/a | Europe | 12 |
| 1966 | American Tour 1966 | 24 June 1966 – 28 July 1966 | Aftermath | North America | 32 |
| 1966 | British Tour 1966 | 23 September 1966 – 9 October 1966 | —N/a | Europe | 23 |
| 1967 | European Tour 1967 | 25 March 1967 – 17 April 1967 | Between the Buttons | Europe | 27 |
| 1969 | American Tour 1969 | 7 November 1969 – 6 December 1969 | Beggars Banquet | North America | 24 |
| 1970 | European Tour 1970 | 30 August 1970 – 9 October 1970 | Let It Bleed | Europe | 23 |
| 1971 | UK Tour 1971 | 4 March 1971 – 26 March 1971 | —N/a | Europe | 18 |
| 1972 | American Tour 1972 | 3 June 1972 – 26 July 1972 | Exile on Main St. | North America | 48 |
| 1973 | Pacific Tour 1973 | 18 January 1973 – 27 February 1973 | —N/a | North America; Oceania | 14 |
| 1973 | European Tour 1973 | 1 September 1973 – 19 October 1973 | Goats Head Soup | Europe | 42 |
| 1975 | Tour of the Americas '75 | 1 June 1975 – 8 August 1975 | Made in the Shade | North America | 46 |
| 1976 | Tour of Europe '76 | 28 April 1976 – 23 June 1976 | Black and Blue | Europe | 41 |
| 1978 | US Tour 1978 | 10 June 1978 – 26 July 1978 | Some Girls | North America | 25 |
| 1981 | American Tour 1981 | 25 September 1981 – 19 December 1981 | Tattoo You | North America | 50 |
| 1982 | European Tour 1982 | 26 May 1982 – 25 July 1982 | Tattoo You | Europe | 36 |
| 1989 | Steel Wheels/Urban Jungle Tour | 31 August 1989 – 25 August 1990 | Steel Wheels | North America; Asia; Europe | 115 |
| 1990 | Steel Wheels/Urban Jungle Tour | 31 August 1989 – 25 August 1990 | Steel Wheels | North America; Asia; Europe | 115 |
| 1994 | **Voodoo Lounge Tour** | 1 August 1994 – 30 August 1995 | Voodoo Lounge | North America; South America; Africa; Asia; Oceania; Europe | 129 |
| 1995 | **Voodoo Lounge Tour** | 1 August 1994 – 30 August 1995 | Voodoo Lounge | North America; South America; Africa; Asia; Oceania; Europe | 129 |
| 1997 | **Bridges to Babylon Tour** | 23 September 1997 – 19 September 1998 | Bridges to Babylon | North America; Asia; South America; Europe | 97 |
| 1998 | **Bridges to Babylon Tour** | 23 September 1997 – 19 September 1998 | Bridges to Babylon | North America; Asia; South America; Europe | 97 |
| 1999 | No Security Tour | 25 January 1999 – 20 June 1999 | No Security | North America; Europe | 43 |
| 2002 | **Licks Tour** | 3 September 2002 – 9 November 2003 | Forty Licks | North America; Oceania; Asia; Europe | 117 |
| 2003 | **Licks Tour** | 3 September 2002 – 9 November 2003 | Forty Licks | North America; Oceania; Asia; Europe | 117 |
| 2005 | **A Bigger Bang Tour** | 21 August 2005 – 26 August 2007 | A Bigger Bang | North America; South America; Asia; Oceania; Europe | 147 |
| 2006 | **A Bigger Bang Tour** | 21 August 2005 – 26 August 2007 | A Bigger Bang | North America; South America; Asia; Oceania; Europe | 147 |
| 2007 | **A Bigger Bang Tour** | 21 August 2005 – 26 August 2007 | A Bigger Bang | North America; South America; Asia; Oceania; Europe | 147 |
| 2012 | 50 & Counting | 25 October 2012 – 13 July 2013 | GRRR! | Europe; North America | 30 |
| 2013 | 50 & Counting | 25 October 2012 – 13 July 2013 | GRRR! | Europe; North America | 30 |
| 2014 | 14 On Fire | 21 February 2014 – 22 November 2014 | —N/a | Asia; Europe; Oceania | 29 |
| 2015 | Zip Code | 20 May 2015 – 15 July 2015 | Sticky Fingers (Deluxe 2015 Edition) | North America | 17 |
| 2016 | América Latina Olé | 3 February 2016 – 25 March 2016 | —N/a | South America | 14 |
| 2017 | No Filter Tour | 9 September 2017 – 23 November 2021 | Blue & Lonesome | Europe; North America | 58 |
| 2018 | No Filter Tour | 9 September 2017 – 23 November 2021 | Blue & Lonesome | Europe; North America | 58 |
| 2019 | No Filter Tour | 9 September 2017 – 23 November 2021 | Blue & Lonesome | Europe; North America | 58 |
| 2021 | No Filter Tour | 9 September 2017 – 23 November 2021 | Blue & Lonesome | Europe; North America | 58 |
| 2022 | Sixty | 1 June 2022 – 3 August 2022 | —N/a | Europe | 14 |
| 2024 | Hackney Diamonds Tour | 28 April 2024 – 21 July 2024 | Hackney Diamonds | North America | 20 |

== See also ==
- List of highest-grossing concert tours
- List of highest-grossing live music artists
