= The Rolling Stones 1966 tours =

The Rolling Stones had four concert tours in 1966. Ike & Tina Turner supported them on the UK leg in the fall. "I didn't know who the Stones were," Tina recalled. "They were just these white boys and Mick was the one who was always standing in the wings watching us. He was a little shy of me, but finally we started having fun and I tried to teach him some dances, because he'd just stand still onstage with the tambourine. He'd try things like the Pony or some hip movements backstage and we'd all just laugh." Tina later appeared solo with the Stones on their 1981 tour. In April, the band released the album Aftermath to critical success; they promoted it during their American tour in June and July.

== Personnel ==
- Mick Jagger – lead vocals, harmonica, tambourine
- Keith Richards – guitar, backing vocals
- Brian Jones – guitar, organ, electric dulcimer, harmonica, backing vocals
- Bill Wyman – bass guitar, backing vocals
- Charlie Watts – drums

== Australian tour ==
Australian tour 1966
- Tour by the Rolling Stones
- Start date: 18 February 1966
- End date: 1 March 1966
- Legs: 1
- No. of shows: 18

the Rolling Stones concert chronology
- 2nd American tour 1965; Australian tour 1966; European tour 1966

The tour of Australia and New Zealand commenced on 18 February and concluded on 1 March 1966.

=== Australian tour dates ===
Date	City	Country	Venue
18 February 1966; 2 shows	Sydney	Australia	Commemorative Auditorium Showgrounds
19 February 1966; 2 shows	Sydney	Australia	Commemorative Auditorium Showgrounds
21 February 1966; 2 shows	Brisbane	Australia	Brisbane City Hall
22 February 1966; 2 shows	Adelaide	Australia	Centennial Hall
24 February 1966; 2 shows	St Kilda	Australia	Palais Theatre
25 February 1966; 2 shows	St Kilda	Australia	Palais Theatre
26 February 1966; 2 shows	St Kilda	Australia	Palais Theatre
28 February 1966; 2 shows	Wellington	New Zealand	Wellington Town Hall
1 March 1966; 2 shows	Auckland	New Zealand	Auckland Civic Theatre

== European tour ==
European tour 1966
- Tour by the Rolling Stones
- Start date: 26 March 1966
- End date: 5 April 1966
- Legs: 1
- No. of shows: 12

the Rolling Stones concert chronology
- Australian tour 1966; European tour 1966; American tour 1966

The European tour commenced on 26 March and concluded on 5 April 1966.

=== European tour dates ===
Date	City	Country	Venue
26 March 1966	Den Bosch	Netherlands	Brabanthal
27 March 1966	Antwerp	Belgium	Palais Des Sports
29 March 1966; 2 shows	Paris	France	L'Olympia
30 March 1966; 2 shows	Marseille	France	Salle Vallier
31 March 1966; 2 shows	Lyon	France	Palais d'Hiver
3 April 1966; 2 shows	Stockholm	Sweden	Kungliga Tennishallen
5 April 1966; 2 shows	Copenhagen	Denmark	K.B. Hallen

== American tour ==
American tour 1966
- Tour by the Rolling Stones
- Associated album: Aftermath
- Start date: 24 June 1966
- End date: 28 July 1966
- Legs: 1
- No. of shows: 32

the Rolling Stones concert chronology
- European tour 1966; American tour 1966; British tour 1966

The American tour commenced on 24 June and concluded on 28 July 1966, and supported their album Aftermath. The last gig – in Honolulu, Hawaii – was broadcast on Hawaiian radio's KPOI.

=== American tour dates ===
Date	City	Country	Venue
24 June 1966	Lynn, Massachusetts	United States	Manning Bowl
25 June 1966	Cleveland	United States	Cleveland Arena
25 June 1966	Pittsburgh	United States	Civic Arena
26 June 1966	Washington, D.C.	United States	Washington Coliseum
26 June 1966	Baltimore	United States	Baltimore Civic Center
27 June 1966	Hartford, Connecticut	United States	Dillon Stadium
28 June 1966	Buffalo, New York	United States	Buffalo Memorial Auditorium
29 June 1966	Toronto	Canada	Maple Leaf Gardens
30 June 1966	Montreal	Canada	Montreal Forum
1 July 1966	Atlantic City, New Jersey	United States	Marine Ballroom, Steel Pier
2 July 1966	New York City	United States	Forest Hills Tennis Stadiums; Music Festival
3 July 1966	Asbury Park, New Jersey	United States	Asbury Park Convention Hall
4 July 1966	Virginia Beach	United States	Virginia Beach Civic Center (The Dome)
6 July 1966	Syracuse, New York	United States	Onondaga County War Memorial
8 July 1966	Detroit	United States	Cobo Hall
9 July 1966	Indianapolis	United States	Indiana State Fair Coliseum
10 July 1966	Chicago	United States	Arie Crown Theater
11 July 1966	Houston	United States	Sam Houston Coliseum
12 July 1966	St. Louis	United States	Kiel Auditorium
14 July 1966	Winnipeg	Canada	Winnipeg Stadium
15 July 1966	Omaha, Nebraska	United States	Omaha Civic Auditorium
19 July 1966	Vancouver	Canada	PNE Forum
20 July 1966	Seattle	United States	Seattle Center Coliseum
21 July 1966	Portland, Oregon	United States	Memorial Coliseum
22 July 1966; 2 shows	Sacramento, California	United States	Memorial Auditorium
23 July 1966	Salt Lake City	United States	Lagoon Amusement Park
24 July 1966; 2PM show	San Bernardino, California	United States	Swing Auditorium
24 July 1966; 2 evening shows	Bakersfield, California	United States	Civic Auditorium
25 July 1966	Los Angeles	United States	Hollywood Bowl
26 July 1966	Daly City	United States	Cow Palace
28 July 1966	Honolulu	United States	Hawaiʻi International Center

=== Hawaii set list ===
1. Intro / Not Fade Away
2. The Last Time
3. Paint It Black
4. Lady Jane
5. Mother's Little Helper
6. Get Off of My Cloud
7. "19th Nervous Breakdown"
8. "(I Can't Get No) Satisfaction"

== British tour ==
British tour 1966
- Tour by the Rolling Stones
- Start date: 23 September 1966
- End date: 9 October 1966
- Legs: 1
- No. of shows: 23

the Rolling Stones concert chronology
- American tour 1966; British tour 1966; European Tour 1967

The British tour commenced on 23 September and concluded on 9 October 1966.

=== British tour dates ===
Date	City	Country	Venue
23 September 1966	London	England	Royal Albert Hall
24 September 1966; 2 shows	Leeds	England	Odeon Theatre
25 September 1966; 2 shows	Liverpool	England	Liverpool Empire Theatre
28 September 1966; 2 shows	Manchester	England	Apollo Theatre
29 September 1966; 2 shows	Stockton-on-Tees	England	ABC Theatre
30 September 1966; 2 shows	Glasgow	Scotland	Odeon Theatre
1 October 1966; 2 shows	Newcastle upon Tyne	England	Newcastle City Hall
2 October 1966; 2 shows	Ipswich	England	Gaumont Theatre
6 October 1966; 2 shows	Birmingham	England	Odeon Theatre
7 October 1966; 2 shows	Bristol	England	Colston Hall
8 October 1966; 2 shows	Cardiff	Wales	Capitol Theatre
9 October 1966; 2 shows	Southampton	England	Gaumont Theatre
