= The Rolling Stones 2nd British Tour 1964 =

1964 concert tour by the Rolling Stones

- Continental tour by the Rolling Stones
- Poster to the concerts in London. A similar layout was used for the other events
- Location: UK, Europe
- Start date: 8 February 1964
- End date: 7 March 1964
- Legs: 1
- No. of shows: 58

the Rolling Stones concert chronology
- 1st British Tour 1964; 2nd British Tour 1964; 1st American Tour 1964

The Rolling Stones' 1964 2nd British Tour was a concert tour. The tour commenced on February 8 and concluded on March 7, 1964. They played two shows at all venues.

== Tour band ==
- Mick Jagger – lead vocals, harmonica, percussion
- Keith Richards – guitar, backing vocals
- Brian Jones – guitar, harmonica, backing vocals
- Bill Wyman – bass guitar, backing vocals
- Charlie Watts – drums

== Tour dates ==
Date	City	Country	Venue
February 8, 1964	London	England	Regal Theater
February 9, 1964	Leicester	England	De Montfort Hall
February 10, 1964	Cheltenham	England	Odeon Theater
February 11, 1964	Rugby	England	Granada Theater
February 12, 1964	Guildford	England	Odeon Theater
February 13, 1964	London	England	Granada Theater
February 14, 1964	Watford	England	Gaumont Theater
February 15, 1964	Rochester	England	Odeon Theater
February 16, 1964	Portsmouth	England	Portsmouth Guildhall
February 17, 1964	London	England	Granada Theater
February 18, 1964	Colchester	England	Rank Theater
February 19, 1964	Stockton	England	Odeon Theater
February 20, 1964	Sunderland	England	Odeon
February 21, 1964	Stoke	England	Gaumont Theater
February 22, 1964	Bournemouth	England	Bournemouth Winter Gardens
February 23, 1964	Birmingham	England	Birmingham Hippodrome
February 24, 1964	Southend	England	Odeon Theater
February 25, 1964	London	England	Odeon Cinema
February 26, 1964	York	England	Rialto Theater
February 27, 1964	Sheffield	England	Sheffield City Hall
February 28, 1964	Cardiff	Wales	Sophia Gardens
February 29, 1964	Brighton	England	Brighton Hippodrome
March 1, 1964	Liverpool	England	Empire Theater
March 2, 1964	Nottingham	England	Albert Hall
March 3, 1964	Blackpool	England	Blackpool Opera House
March 4, 1964	Bradford	England	Gaumont Cinema
March 5, 1964	Blackburn	England	Odeon Theater
March 6, 1964	Wolverhampton	England	Gaumont Cinema
March 7, 1964	Morecambe	England	Morecambe Winter Gardens
