= The Rolling Stones 2nd American Tour 1964 =

1964 concert tour by the Rolling Stones

- National tour by the Rolling Stones
- Poster to the concert in Louisville
- Location: North America
- Associated album: 12 X 5
- Start date: 24 October 1964
- End date: 11 November 1964
- Legs: 1
- No. of shows: 11

the Rolling Stones concert chronology
- 4th British Tour 1964; 2nd American Tour 1964; Irish Tour 1965

The Rolling Stones' 1964 2nd American Tour was a concert tour by the band. The tour commenced on October 24 and concluded on November 15, 1964. On this tour, the band supported their album 12 X 5.

== The Rolling Stones ==
- Mick Jagger – lead vocals, percussion, harmonica
- Keith Richards – guitar, backing vocals
- Brian Jones – guitar, harmonica, backing vocals
- Bill Wyman – bass guitar, backing vocals
- Charlie Watts – drums

== Tour set list ==
1. "Not Fade Away"
2. "Walking the Dog"
3. "If You Need Me"
4. "Carol"
5. "Time Is on My Side"
6. "Around and Around"
7. "Tell Me"
8. "It's All Over Now"
9. "Hi-Heel Sneakers"
10. "You Can Make It If You Try"
11. "I'm a King Bee"
12. "I'm Alright"

== Tour dates ==
- 24/10/1964 New York City, New York, Academy of Music (2 shows)
- 26/10/1964 Sacramento, California, Memorial Auditorium
- 31/10/1964 San Bernardino, California, Swing Auditorium
- 01/11/1964 Long Beach, California, Civic Auditorium
- 02/11/1964 San Diego, California, Balboa Park Bowl
- 03/11/1964 Cleveland, Ohio, Public Hall
- 04/11/1964 Providence, Rhode Island, Loews Theater
- 11/11/1964 Milwaukee, Wisconsin, Auditorium (without Brian Jones)
- 12/11/1964 Fort Wayne, Indiana, War Memorial Coliseum (without Brian Jones)
- 13/11/1964 Dayton, Ohio, Wampler's Hara Arena (without Brian Jones)
- 14/11/1964 Louisville, Kentucky, Memorial Auditorium (2 shows) (without Brian Jones)
- 15/11/1964 Chicago, Illinois, Arie Crown Theatre
