= The Rolling Stones Australasian Tour 1966 =

1966 concert tour by the Rolling Stones

The Rolling Stones Australian Tour 1966
- Continental tour by the Rolling Stones
- Advertisement for the concerts in St. Kilda
- Location: Oceania
- Start date: 18 February 1966
- End date: 1 March 1966
- No. of shows: 18

the Rolling Stones concert chronology
- 2nd American Tour 1965; Australian Tour 1966; European Tour 1966

The Rolling Stones' 1966 Australian Tour was a concert tour of Australia and New Zealand by the band. The tour commenced on 18 February and concluded on 1 March 1966.

== The Rolling Stones ==
- Mick Jagger – lead vocals, harmonica, maracas
- Keith Richards – guitar, backing vocals
- Brian Jones – guitar, harmonica, organ on "That's How Strong My Love Is", backing vocals, tambourine
- Bill Wyman – bass guitar, backing vocals
- Charlie Watts – drums

== Tour set list ==
Songs performed include:

- Mercy, Mercy
- She Said Yeah
- Play with Fire
- Not Fade Away
- The Spider and the Fly
- That's How Strong My Love Is
- "Get Off of My Cloud"
- "19th Nervous Breakdown"
- "(I Can't Get No) Satisfaction"

== Tour dates ==
Date	City	Country	Venue
18 February 1966*; 2 shows	Sydney	Australia	Commemorative Auditorium Showgrounds
19 February 1966*; 2 shows	Sydney	Australia	Commemorative Auditorium Showgrounds
21 February 1966; 2 shows	Brisbane	Australia	Brisbane City Hall
22 February 1966; 2 shows	Adelaide	Australia	Centennial Hall
24 February 1966; 2 shows	Melbourne	Australia	Palais Theatre, St. Kilda
25 February 1966; 2 shows	Melbourne	Australia	Palais Theatre, St. Kilda
26 February 1966; 2 shows	Melbourne	Australia	Palais Theatre, St. Kilda
28 February 1966; 2 shows	Wellington	New Zealand	Town Hall
1 March 1966; 2 shows	Auckland	New Zealand	Civic Theatre

*The shows in Sydney had The Searchers as a support act.
