= The Rolling Stones 3rd British Tour 1964 =

1964 concert tour by the Rolling Stones

- Tour by the Rolling Stones
- Poster to the concert in Weymouth, Dorset
- Associated album: The Rolling Stones
- Start date: 1 August 1964
- End date: 29 August 1964
- Legs: 1
- No. of shows: 11

the Rolling Stones concert chronology
- 1st American Tour 1964; 3rd British Tour 1964; 4th British Tour 1964

The Rolling Stones' 1964 3rd British Tour was a concert tour by the band. The tour commenced on August 1 and concluded on August 29, 1964. It included a single concert in The Netherlands.

== The Rolling Stones ==
- Mick Jagger – lead vocals, harmonica, percussion
- Keith Richards – guitar, backing vocals
- Brian Jones – guitar, harmonica, backing vocals
- Bill Wyman – bass guitar, backing vocals
- Charlie Watts – drums

== Tour set list ==
Songs performed include:

- Not Fade Away
- Walking the Dog
- I Just Want to Make Love to You
- If You Need Me
- Around and Around
- Hi-Heel Sneakers
- I Wanna Be Your Man
- I'm a King Bee
- "You Can Make It If You Try
- Down in the Bottom
- Carol
- Tell Me
- It's All Over Now
- Suzie Q
- Can I Get a Witness

== Tour dates ==
- 01/08/1964 Hastings, Pier Ballroom (stop after 12 minutes due to hysteria)
- 03/08/1964 Longleat House, Warminster
- 07/08/1964 London, Richmond Athletic Ground
- 08/08/1964 Scheveningen, Netherlands, Kurhaus, Kurzaal
- 09/08/1964 Manchester, Belle Vue, New Elizabethan Ballroom
- 10/08/1964 New Brighton, Tower Ballroom
- 13/08/1964 Douglas, Isle of Man, Palace Ballroom
- 18/08/1964 St. Peter Port, New Theatre Ballroom, Guernsey
- 19/08/1964 St. Peter Port, New Theatre Ballroom, Guernsey
- 20/08/1964 St. Peter Port, New Theatre Ballroom, Guernsey
- 21/08/1964 St. Helier, Springfield Hall, Jersey
- 22/08/1964 St. Helier, Springfield Hall, Jersey
- 24/08/1964 Weymouth, Gaumont Cinema, Dorset (two shows)
- 25/08/1964 Weston-super-Mare, Odeon Cinema, Somerset (two shows)
- 26/08/1964 Exeter, ABC Cinema, Devon (two shows)
- 29/08/1964 Torquay, Town Hall, Devon (two shows)
