= The Stones in the Park =

1969 outdoor festival in Hyde Park, London

Coordinates: 51°30′23″N 0°10′08″W

Hyde Park Festival, 5 July 1969
- Free concert by the Rolling Stones
- Venue: Hyde Park, London
- Date: 5 July 1969
- Attendance: 250,000–500,000 (estimated)

the Rolling Stones concert chronology
- European Tour 1967; Hyde Park Festival, 5 July 1969; American Tour 1969

The Stones in the Park was a free outdoor festival held in Hyde Park on 5 July 1969, headlined by the Rolling Stones and featuring Third Ear Band, King Crimson, Screw, Alexis Korner's New Church, Family and the Battered Ornaments, in front of an estimated audience between 250,000 and 500,000 spectators.

It was the Stones' first public concert in over two years, and was planned as an introduction of their new guitarist, Mick Taylor, though circumstances inevitably changed following the death of former member Brian Jones two days earlier. The band rehearsed at the Beatles' studio in a basement on Savile Row, and Mick Jagger and Keith Richards came up with a 14-song set; the Hyde Park concert would be the first time many of the songs had been played before a public audience. The PA system was supplied by Watkins Electric Music, who had handled amplification at previous Hyde Park events.

Picture during the concert

Fans started to arrive at the park with candles on 4 July in tribute to Jones, and by the morning of 5 July, 7,000 people had already gathered. Jagger read a short eulogy on stage before the Stones' set began, reading two stanzas of Percy Bysshe Shelley's poem on John Keats's death, Adonaïs, from a calf-bound book. After this recital, several hundred cabbage white butterflies were released.

While the event is considered a memorable one by several critics, they also agree that it was not one of the Stones' best performances. In a 1971 interview with Rolling Stone magazine, Richards evaluated their performance, "We played pretty bad until near the end, because we hadn't played for years ... Nobody minded, because they just wanted to hear us play again." The Stones' portion of concert, together with interviews with the Stones and concert-goers, and backstage scenes, was filmed by Granada Television and broadcast that September. It has since been released on DVD and Blu-ray. In April 2013, the band announced their intention to play two return concerts on 6 and 13 July, although the performances were not free.

== Background ==
The festival was an important one for the Stones. They had not performed a public concert since their 1967 European Tour, and in 1968 had only performed at the NME Poll Winners Concert and at their television project The Rolling Stones Rock and Roll Circus. In interviews, Mick Jagger stated that he felt the band's forte was performing live, rather than in the studio, and was keen to return to the stage. Blackhill Enterprises, which had already managed several successful concerts in Hyde Park, including a festival headlined by Blind Faith in June 1969 attended by 150,000 people, were contacted to organise one at the next convenient date after the organiser-compère of that concert, Sam Cutler, had met Jagger in the VIP area at the concert and later at the Royal Albert Hall. When asked why the festival would be free, Jagger noted that they had not made much money from previous concert tours anyway, and that he felt the audience would have a better time if they did not have to pay although he ensured that the cost of the concert would be covered by selling exclusive television rights to Granada Television.

However, the gradual estrangement of Brian Jones and his decreasing musical contributions – he had only appeared on two tracks on the then in-progress Let It Bleed — made a return to touring problematic. They had shelved The Rolling Stones Rock and Roll Circus after having been upstaged by The Who. By June 1969, matters had finally come to a head and it was decided that Jones should be replaced for the gig.

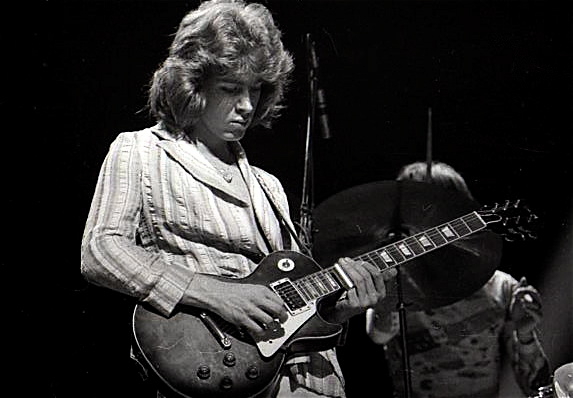
The Hyde Park concert was Mick Taylor's first gig with the band

Mick Taylor, who had by this time obtained a reputation for himself by playing with John Mayall & the Bluesbreakers, was invited to work on Let It Bleed. The band enjoyed his contributions and decided to make him an offer to join full-time. After considering this for a few days, he accepted, and his position was officially announced at a press conference in the park's bandstand on 13 June. The single "Honky Tonk Women," recorded on 1 June with Taylor, was rush-released to tie in with the festival date. The Hyde Park concert would be Taylor's first gig with the band, and as they had barely had any time to rehearse with him he was understandably nervous. Jagger, too, was nervous, unsure whether Jones's fans would take to Taylor and indeed whether they would boycott the concert; he did not expect the crowd to match the 150,000 who had come to the Blind Faith gig. In addition, the hot summer had sent the pollen levels soaring and Jagger suffered from hay-fever and laryngitis in the days leading up to the concert.

Jones died on 3 July, two days before the festival. The Stones were in Olympic Studios when they were told of his death by Ian Stewart, and, although grief-stricken, decided they would go ahead with the gig and dedicate their performance to him. Keith Richards later wrote:

The all-important thing for us was it was our first appearance for a long time, and with a change of personnel. It was Mick Taylor's first gig. We were going to do it anyway. Obviously a statement had to be made of one kind or another, so we turned it into a memorial for Brian. We wanted to see him off in grand style. The ups and downs with the guy are one thing, but when his time's over, release the doves, or in this case the sackfuls of white butterflies.

The band rehearsed at the Beatles' studio in the basement of Savile Row, and Jagger and Richards came up with a 14-song set; the Hyde Park concert would be the first time many of the songs had been played before a public audience.

== Performance ==
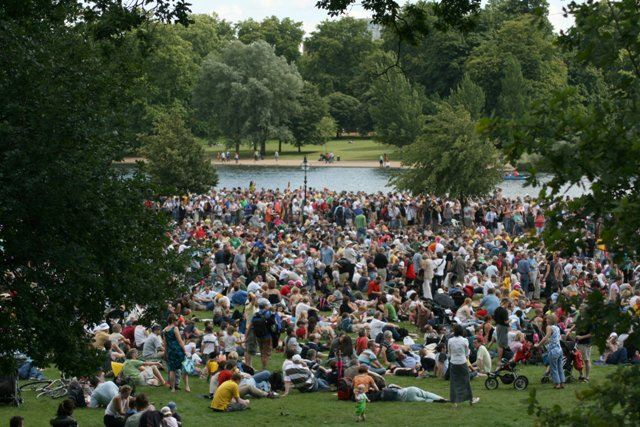
Hyde Park, seen here in 2007

The performers at the festival included Third Ear Band, Screw, King Crimson, Alexis Korner's New Church, Roy Harper, Battered Ornaments, Family and The Rolling Stones.

Fans started to arrive at the park with candles on 4 July in tribute to Jones, and the police allowed the park to be opened late so they could stay. By the following morning, there were already 7,000 people. As with the Stones' performance at the infamous Altamont Free Concert later that year, the Hells Angels were hired as stewards to protect the stage and equipment, something suggested by the Grateful Dead's manager Rock Scully, who was used to the Angels performing this service at free festivals in California. According to Cutler, Jagger said that he was keen on doing a similar free concert in California at some time in the future. At Hyde Park, fifty Angels patrolled the vicinity of the stage, though there was little resemblance other than a superficial one to their American counterparts. They performed their duties in exchange for a cup of tea. In the event, there were only twelve arrests on the day and a subsequent police report claimed that the Angels were "totally ineffective".

King Crimson at this point still consisted of the original line-up of Robert Fripp, Greg Lake, Ian McDonald, Michael Giles and lyricist Peter Sinfield. They had not yet released an album, and were invited to play on the strength of word of mouth after their live performances in venues such as the Marquee Club. Sam Cutler introduced them on stage, stating the "new band is gonna go a long way". The band's setlist was "21st Century Schizoid Man", "The Court of the Crimson King", "Get Thy Bearings", "Epitaph", "Mantra", "Travel Weary Capricorn" and "Mars".

Three of the tracks appeared in studio form on the band's debut album, In the Court of the Crimson King, albeit with different lyrics compared with the performance here. The band's set has since been released on CD, with some bonus material. Recalling the event, Fripp remembers the sense of community at the event and the good weather, particularly noting a sense of goodwill backstage.

Alexis Korner's involvement with Blues Incorporated had been a key ingredient in the Stones forming in 1962, and he had played onstage with several group members during this time. New Church had been formed with guitarist Peter Thorup after the demise of Blues Incorporated.

Roy Harper had been regularly appearing at a number of Hyde Park festivals since 1968 and saw his popularity increase as a result of these. This eventually resulted in Blackhill's Peter Jenner managing him, leading to a contract with Harvest Records. For 5 July gig, he contributed a one-song set between equipment changes.

The Battered Ornaments had been the backing band for Cream collaborator Pete Brown. They performed without Brown, who had been fired from the band the previous day. Guitarist Chris Spedding took over lead vocals. The band supplied the armoured personnel carrier that carried the Stones from their hotel to the park.

=== The Rolling Stones ===
The band met at the Londonderry Hotel on Park Lane, overlooking the park, where they had booked a tenth-floor suite, and proceeded to the park in the armoured personnel carrier, together with their two official photographers, Michael Cooper and Spanish Tony Sanchez. They alighted from the carrier into a caravan-trailer behind the stage. Jagger, his face heavily made up and with a studded leather collar around his neck, was clad in a white dress. He had borrowed the dress, which had been made for Sammy Davis Jr. at the Mr. Fish boutique, and wore it to Prince Rupert Lowenstein's white ball, where he had shown it to Princess Margaret. Jagger was only to wear it for half-an-hour at the Hyde Park concert, after which he tore it off to reveal a violet T-shirt and white loon pants.

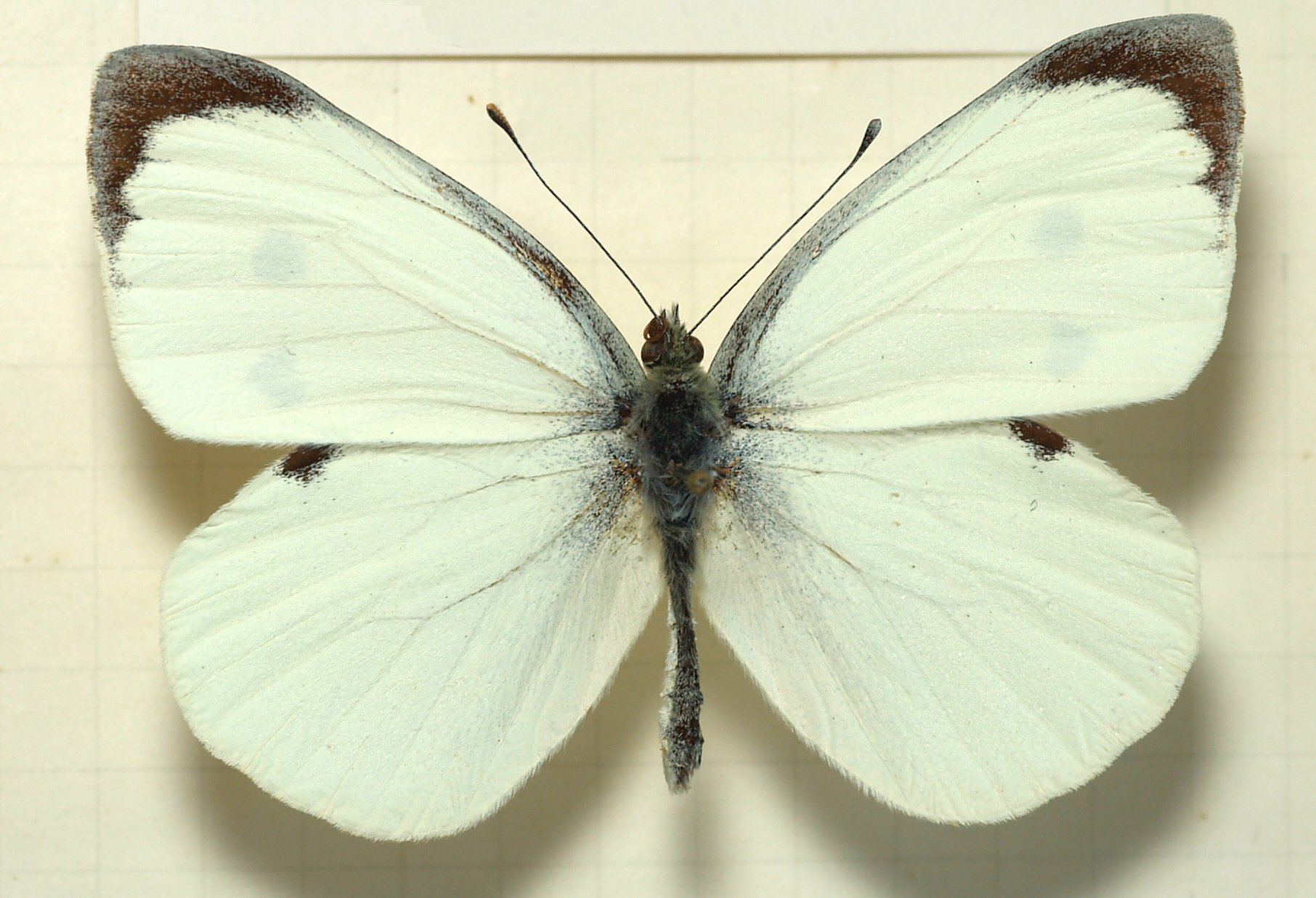
A male specimen of Pieris brassicae, the large cabbage white

Before the Stones opened their set, Jagger addressed the crowd, asking them to be quiet so he could read something as a tribute to Jones. He then read two stanzas of Percy Bysshe Shelley's poem on John Keats's death, Adonaïs, from a calf-bound book. After this recital, several hundred cabbage white butterflies were released, despite the Royal Parks authority having stipulated before the concert that any butterflies released by the Stones should be sterilised and should certainly not be of the voracious cabbage white genus (Pieris spp.). Two and a half thousand butterflies were due to be released, but many of them died from lack of air in storage.

The Stones then launched into "I'm Yours and I'm Hers", which, according to Philip Norman, was an ironic choice given that Marianne Faithfull and Marsha Hunt, both of whom Jagger was alleged to be having relationships with at that time, were in the audience. (The song was performed because it was a favourite of Jones.)

The setlist for their performance was "I'm Yours & I'm Hers", "Jumpin' Jack Flash", "No Expectations", "Mercy Mercy", "Stray Cat Blues", "I'm Free", "Down Home Girl", "Love in Vain", "Give Me a Little Drink", "Midnight Rambler", "(I Can't Get No) Satisfaction", "Honky Tonk Women", "Street Fighting Man" and "Sympathy for the Devil".

During the 18-minute-long rendition of "Sympathy for the Devil", a number of Ginger Johnson's African tribal drummers joined the band. After the concert ended, the volunteers who cleared up the 5,000 tonnes of rubbish were each given a copy of "Honky Tonk Women".

Though park keepers feared that the crowd would cause damage to the park, an official estimate suggested the cost was only around £100 (now £1,000). Park superintendent John Hare reported the most serious damage was to a silver birch tree planted the previous year. He praised the concertgoers, many of whom helped clear up after the concert and were awarded with a free Stones LP if they returned a full sack.

== Date ==
Date	City	Country	Venue	Opening Acts
5 July 1969	London	England	Hyde Park	Family Battered Ornaments Roy Harper Alexis Korner's New Church King Crimson Screw Third Ear Band

== Equipment ==
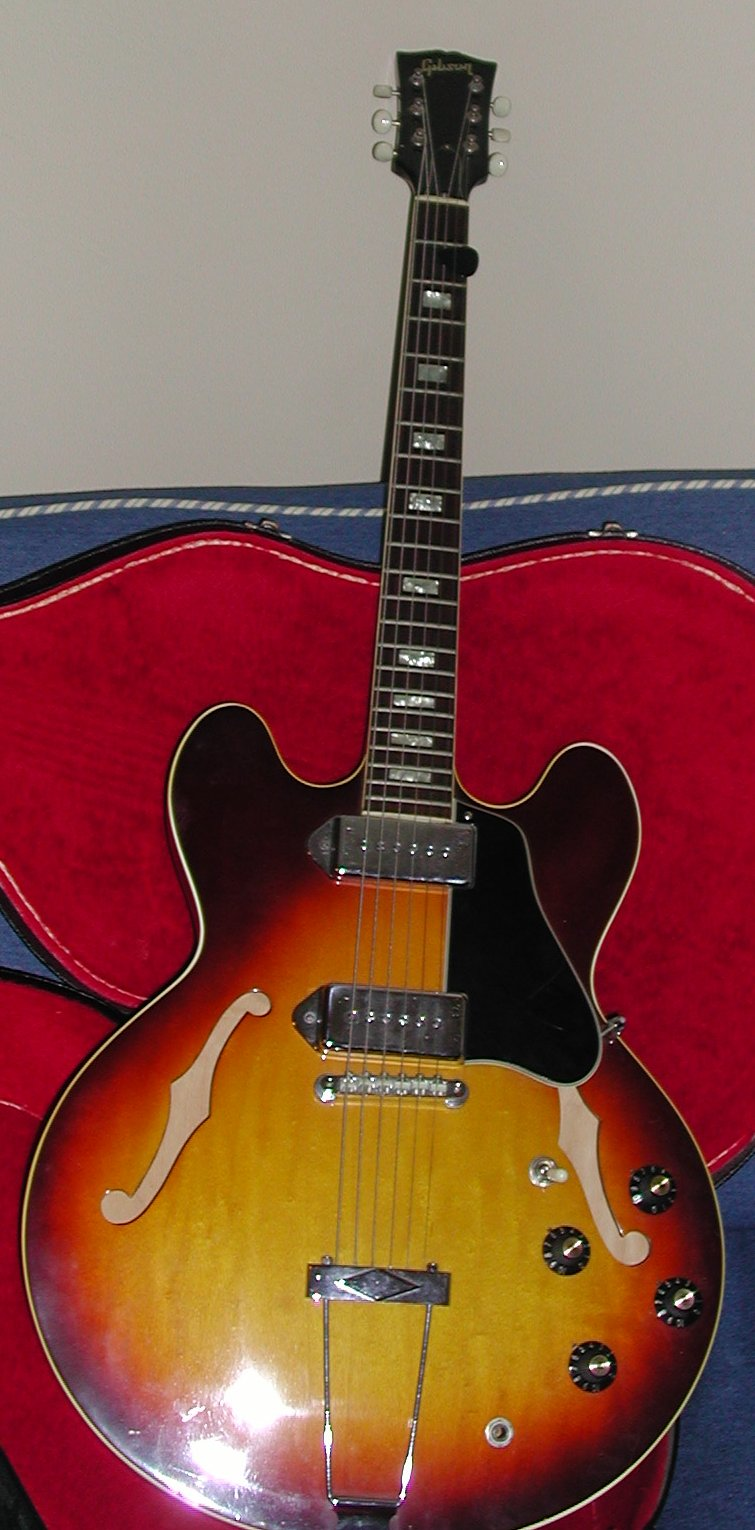
A Gibson ES-330 similar to the one that Keith Richards used for part of the set at Hyde Park

Blackhill Enterprises provided a 6 feet (1.8 m) high stage, with the speakers being housed in a thirty-foot-high tower so that people at the far end of the park would be able to hear the music. The stage was flanked by palm trees in pots and behind the performers there was a blowup of the cover of the Beggars Banquet album. Richards had started experimenting with open tunings by this point in the band's career, particularly after hearing Ry Cooder, and the Hyde Park gig was the first chance audiences got to hear them. He played a Gibson ES-330 tuned to open G tuning played both open and with a capo on the fourth fret, and a Gibson Flying V. Taylor, meanwhile, played a Gibson Les Paul for the opening number, followed by an SG for the majority of the set. The PA system was supplied by Watkins Electric Music, who already handled amplification at previous Hyde Park shows. Company founder Charlie Watkins recalls it was the largest PA he had assembled to that point and, unable to provide enough gear himself, he was forced to borrow extras from other groups, later saying, "I didn't have many columns, but I wanted to put 1500W up. I borrowed some from T-Rex. They all chipped in — that's what we used to do."

== Reception ==
In 1971, in an interview with Rolling Stone magazine, Richards said, "We played pretty bad until near the end, because we hadn't played for years ... Nobody minded, because they just wanted to hear us play again."

The Guardian's Richard Gott stated that the show was "a great and epoch-making event in British social history", although he added that "most of the music ... was indifferent". According to Norman, "the band's underpreparedness was painfully obvious. Keith and Mick Taylor's guitars, so harmonious at first meeting, turned into a pair of pneumatic drills fighting a grudge match to the death. Charlie's drumming and Bill's bass each seemed to have melted into jelly." The Daily Telegraph's Iain Martin stated that the Stones were "under-rehearsed and quite possibly nervous, not having performed live in front of an audience in more than two years. The guitars were badly out of tune and half the songs were approached at the wrong tempo", adding that Jagger appeared to be "trying to cover up for the shortcomings of his bandmates". Retrospectively reviewing the DVD release of the Stones' set, Film 4 commented: "It isn't the greatest film about the band and it isn't their greatest performance, but for fans it captures the band at a significant moment."

== DVD release ==
The Stones in the Park

Video by The Rolling Stones
- Released: 25 September 2006; 2 September 1969 (TV)
- Recorded: 5 July 1969
- Genre: Documentary film
- Length: 56 minutes
- Label: Granada Ventures
- Directors: Leslie Woodhead and Jo Durden-Smith
- Producer: John Sheppard

The DVD, released on 25 September 2006, includes the same concert footage as the TV broadcast of 25 September 1969. The DVD includes three previously unseen songs which were filmed at the concert – "Mercy, Mercy", "Stray Cat Blues" and "No Expectations". The latter two are incomplete but are included here due to their uniqueness (HD). Also included is news footage of their early fame from 1964, footage of Mick Jagger discussing his arrest for drugs possession in July 1967 and his subsequent press conference on his release from prison, and a 1971 interview with Bill Wyman and Charlie Watts about their tour of France.

Eagle Rock Entertainment later reissued the special on DVD and Blu-ray as From the Vault – Hyde Park – Live in 1969 in 2015.

=== Track listing ===
1. "Midnight Rambler" (4:30)
2. "(I Can't Get No) Satisfaction" (4:00)
3. "I'm Free" (2:50)
4. Eulogy (for Brian Jones) (2:00)
5. "I'm Yours & I'm Hers" (Johnny Winter) (2:10)
6. "Jumpin' Jack Flash" (3:20)
7. "Honky Tonk Women" (3:05)
8. "Love in Vain" (Robert Johnson) (4:30)
9. "Sympathy for the Devil" (10:30)

Bonus tracks

- "Mercy Mercy"
- "Stray Cat Blues"
- "No Expectations"

== 2013 concert ==
On Richard Bacon's BBC Radio 5 Live show on 3 April 2013 it was announced that the Rolling Stones would hold a concert in Hyde Park as part of their 50th anniversary celebrations on 6 July. Mick Jagger quipped, "I'll try and keep the poetry to a minimum", and remarked, in respect of the white dress that he wore for the 1969 concert, "I can still just about get into the zippers." On 9 April it was announced that they would hold a second concert, on 13 July.

== See also ==
- List of historic rock festivals
