= Tony Sanchez (photographer) =

British photographer of Spanish ancestry

Tony Sanchez, also known as Spanish Tony (died 2000), was a British photographer of Spanish ancestry. He worked as Keith Richards' assistant for eight years and co-wrote with John Blake a bestselling memoir about this time, entitled Up and Down with the Rolling Stones: My Rollercoaster Ride with Keith Richards (1979).

Sanchez was the son of Spanish immigrants, and his father ran an Italian restaurant in London's Mayfair.

Sanchez met the Rolling Stones through his connection with the art dealer Robert Fraser. According to Keith Richards, Sanchez, who had been a croupier and bouncer, was able to help Fraser when he was in trouble with gambling debts, and became Fraser's drug dealer and general helper.

Sanchez was one of the Rolling Stones' two official photographers, along with Michael Cooper for The Stones in the Park free outdoor festival held in London's Hyde Park on 5 July 1969.

Tony Sanchez died in 2000.

== Publications ==
- Up and Down with the Rolling Stones (1979), originally entitled Up and Down with the Rolling Stones - The Inside Story
