= The Rolling Stones 1st British Tour 1964 =

1964 concert tour by the Rolling Stones

- National tour by the Rolling Stones
- Poster to the final concerts in Bristol
- Location: England, Europe
- Start date: 6 January 1964
- End date: 27 January 1964
- Legs: 1
- No. of shows: 28

the Rolling Stones concert chronology
- British Tour 1963; 1st British Tour 1964; 2nd British Tour 1964

The Rolling Stones' 1964 1st British Tour was a concert tour. The tour commenced on 6 January and concluded on 27 January 1964. They played two shows a day at all venues.

== Tour band ==
- Mick Jagger – lead vocals, harmonica, percussion
- Keith Richards – guitar, backing vocals
- Brian Jones – guitar, harmonica, backing vocals
- Bill Wyman – bass guitar, backing vocals
- Charlie Watts – drums

== Tour set list ==
1. "Girls"
2. "Come On"
3. "Mona"
4. "You Better Move On"
5. "Roll Over Beethoven"
6. "I Wanna Be Your Man"
7. "Money (That's What I Want)"
8. "Memphis Tennessee"
9. "Pretty Thing"
10. "I Can Tell"
11. "Road Runner"
12. "Bye Bye Johnny"

== Tour dates ==
Date	City	Country	Venue
6 January 1964	London	England	Granada Theatre
7 January 1964	Slough	England	Adelphi Cinema
8 January 1964	Maidstone	England	Granada Cinema
9 January 1964	Kettering	England	Granada Theatre
10 January 1964	London	England	Granada Cinema
12 January 1964	London	England	Granada Cinema
14 January 1964	Mansfield	England	Granada Cinema
15 January 1964	Bedford	England	Granada Cinema
19 January 1964	Coventry	England	Coventry Theatre
20 January 1964	London	England	Granada Cinema
21 January 1964	Aylesbury	England	Granada Theatre
22 January 1964	Shrewsbury	England	Granada Theatre
26 January 1964	Leicester	England	De Montfort Hall
27 January 1964	Bristol	England	Colston Hall
