= The Progressive Blues Experiment =

1968 studio album by Johnny Winter

Studio album by Johnny Winter
- Released: 1968
- Recorded: August 1968
- Studio: Vulcan Gas Company, Austin, Texas
- Genre: Blues
- Label: Sonobeat
- Producer: Bill Josey; Rim Kelley

Johnny Winter chronology
The Progressive Blues Experiment (1968)	Johnny Winter (1969)

Professional ratings
Review scores
Source	Rating
AllMusic	4/5 stars
The Penguin Guide to Blues Recordings	3.5/4 stars
Rolling Stone	(mixed)

The Progressive Blues Experiment is the unauthorized debut album by American blues rock musician Johnny Winter. He recorded it in August 1968 at the Vulcan Gas Company, an Austin music club, with his original trio of Tommy Shannon on bass guitar and John "Red" Turner on drums. The album features a mix of Winter originals and older blues songs, including the standards "Rollin' and Tumblin'", "Help Me", and "Forty-Four".

Local Austin, Texas-based Sonobeat Records issued the album with a plain white cover in late 1968. After Winter signed to Columbia Records, the rights were sold to Imperial Records, who reissued it in March 1969. The Imperial edition, with a new cover, reached number 40 on the Billboard 200 album chart. In 1973, United Artists reissued it with another new cover under the name Austin Texas. In 2005, Capitol issued a 24-bit remastered edition of the album on compact disc.

"Bill Josey, who owned Sonobeat Records, had recorded a live show at the Vulcan Gas Company in Austin so Johnny would have a demo to shop for a major label. However, Josey released that performance as Progressive Blues Experiment on his own label. But before the ink had dried on Johnny's Columbia contract, Josey sold the LP to United Artists. This album is still one of Johnny's best-selling and most highly acclaimed releases, but the artist never saw a penny. 'Bill Josey had the tapes and he got the money,' Johnny says. 'Even now when they sell that CD, I don't get any money.'"

== Track listing ==
Songwriters and track running times are taken from the original Sonobeat LP. Other releases may have different listings.

Side one
No.	Title	Writer(s)	Length
1.	"Rollin' and Tumblin'"	McKinley Morganfield (a.k.a. Muddy Waters)	3:09
2.	"Tribute to Muddy"	Johnny Winter	6:20
3.	"I Got Love If You Want It"	James Moore (a.k.a. Slim Harpo)	3:52
4.	"Bad Luck and Trouble"	Winter	3:43
5.	"Help Me"	Sonny Boy Williamson, Ralph Bass	3:46

Side two
No.	Title	Writer(s)	Length
1.	"Mean Town Blues"	Winter	4:26
2.	"Broke Down Engine"	Blind Willie McTell (Note: On the 1969 Imperial reissue, the credit for "Broke Down Engine" is shown as "Arranged & Adapted by Johnny Winter".)	3:25
3.	"Black Cat Bone"	Winter	3:46
4.	"It's My Own Fault"	B.B. King, Jules Taub (a.k.a. Jules Bihari)	7:20
5.	"Forty-Four"	Roosevelt Sykes (Note: On the 1969 Imperial reissue, the credit for "Forty-Four" is shown as "C. Burnett" (also known as Howlin' Wolf).)	3:28

== Personnel ==
- Johnny Winter – vocals, electric guitar, National steel guitar, mandolin, harmonica
- Tommy Shannon – bass guitar
- John "Red" Turner – drums
