= The Rolling Stones European Tour 1966 =

1966 concert tour by the Rolling Stones

- Continental tour by the Rolling Stones
- Poster to the concerts in Marseille, France
- Location: Europe
- Start date: 26 March 1966
- End date: 5 April 1966
- No. of shows: 12

the Rolling Stones concert chronology
- Australasian Tour 1966; European Tour 1966; American Tour 1966

The Rolling Stones' 1966 European Tour was a concert tour by the band. The tour commenced on 26 March and concluded on 5 April, 1966. Support acts for the tour included Wayne Fontana & the Mindbenders, Ian Witcomb, Antoine et les Problèmes (les Charlots), the Newbeats, Les Hou-Lops and Ronnie Bird.

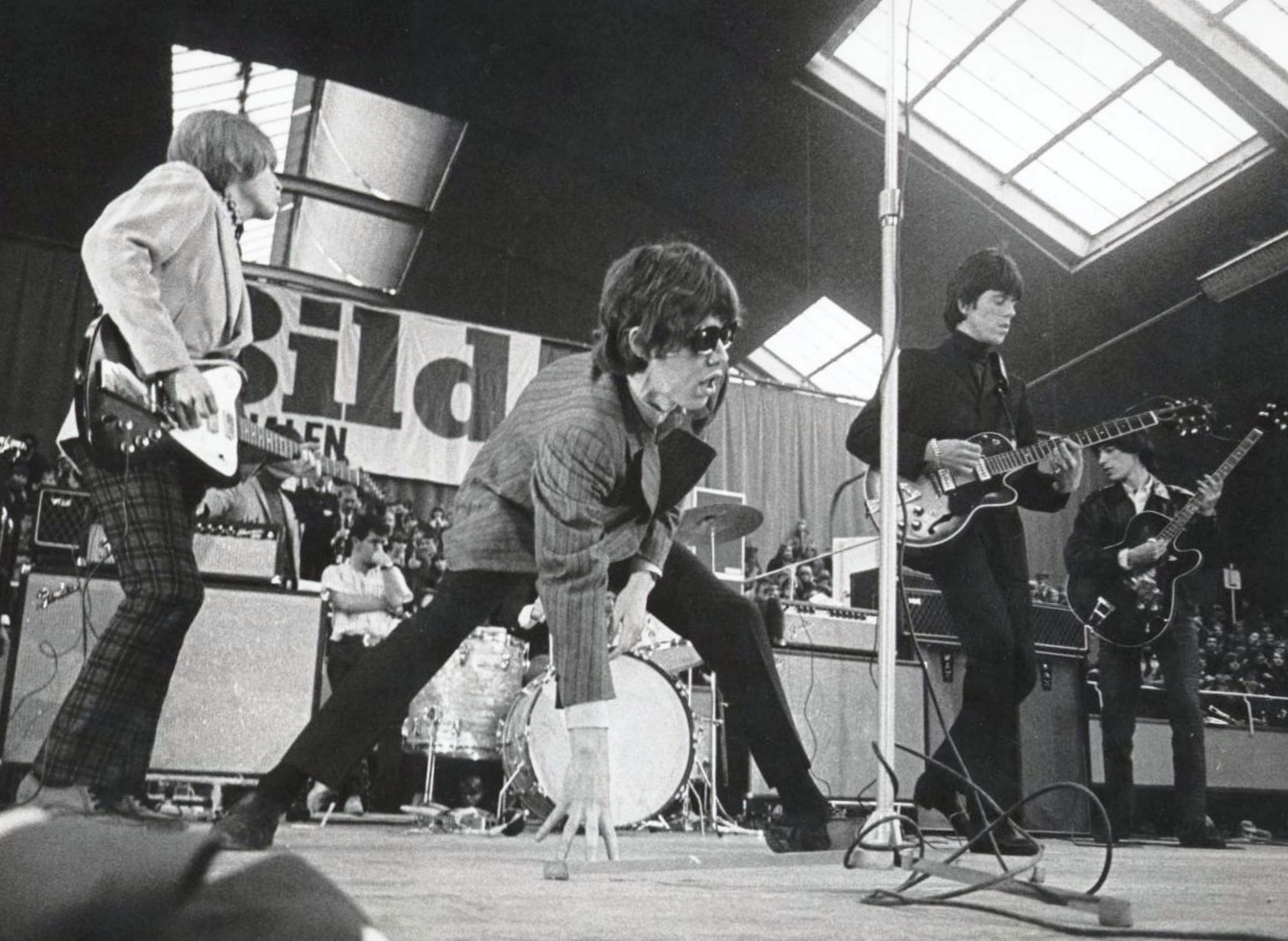
The Rolling Stones at the Kungliga tennishallen. From left: Brian Jones, Mick Jagger, Keith Richards, Bill Wyman

== Personnel ==
The Rolling Stones

- Mick Jagger – lead vocals, harmonica, percussion
- Keith Richards – guitar, backing vocals
- Brian Jones – guitar, harmonica, backing vocals, percussion
- Bill Wyman – bass guitar, backing vocals
- Charlie Watts – drums

== Tour dates ==
Date	City	Country	Venue
26 March 1966	Den Bosch	Netherlands	Brabanthal
27 March 1966	Schaerbeek	Belgium	Palais Des Sports
29 March 1966; 2 shows	Paris	France	L'Olympia
30 March 1966; 2 shows	Marseille	France	Salle Vallier
31 March 1966; 2 shows	Lyon	France	Palais d'Hiver
3 April 1966; 2 shows	Stockholm	Sweden	Kungliga Tennishallen
5 April 1966; 2 shows	Copenhagen	Denmark	K.B. Hallen

== Set list ==
- The Last Time
- Mercy Mercy (Don Covay cover)
- She Said Yeah (Larry Williams cover)
- Play With Fire
- Not Fade Away (The Crickets cover)
- The Spider and the Fly
- Time Is on My Side (Kai Winding & His Orchestra cover)
- "19th Nervous Breakdown"
- Hang On Sloopy (The McCoys cover)
- "Get Off of My Cloud"
- Around and Around (Chuck Berry cover)
- I'm All Right (Bo Diddley cover)
- (I Can't Get No) Satisfaction
