= The Rolling Stones 1st American Tour 1964 =

1964 concert tour by the Rolling Stones

- National tour by the Rolling Stones
- Poster to the final concerts in New York City
- Location: U.S., North America
- Associated album: The Rolling Stones
- Start date: 5 June 1964
- End date: 20 June 1964
- Legs: 1
- No. of shows: 11

the Rolling Stones concert chronology
- 2nd British Tour 1964; 1st American Tour 1964; 3rd British Tour 1964

The Rolling Stones' 1964 1st American Tour was the band's first concert tour of the United States. The tour commenced on June 5 and concluded on June 20, 1964. On this tour, the band supported their first U.S. album The Rolling Stones. The band played eleven shows in total, including two each on 6 and 7 June, and gave several performances on various television shows during the tour. The band also recorded their next single, "It's All Over Now", next British EP, Five by Five, and much of its next US album, 12 x 5, at Chess Studios on 10 and 11 June.

== Tour set list ==
1. "Not Fade Away"
2. "Talkin' 'Bout You"
3. "I Wanna Be Your Man"
4. "Hi-Heeled Sneakers"
5. "Route 66"
6. "Walking The Dog"
7. "Tell Me"
8. "Beautiful Delilah"
9. "Can I Get a Witness"
10. "I Just Want To Make Love To You"
11. "I'm Alright"

== Tour dates ==
Date	City	Country	Venue
5 June 1964	San Bernardino	United States	Swing Auditorium
6 June 1964 (2 shows)	San Antonio	United States	Joe Freeman Coliseum
7 June 1964 (2 shows)	San Antonio	United States	Joe Freeman Coliseum
12 June 1964	Excelsior	United States	Excelsior Amusement Park
13 June 1964	Omaha	United States	Music Hall Auditorium
14 June 1964	Detroit	United States	Olympia Stadium
17 June 1964	Pittsburgh	United States	West View Park
18 June 1964	Syracuse	United States	Onondaga County War Memorial
19 June 1964	Harrisburg	United States	Farm Show Arena
20 June 1964 (2 shows)	New York City	United States	Carnegie Hall
