= The Rolling Stones British Tour 1963 =

1963 concert tour by the Rolling Stones

- Continental tour by the Rolling Stones
- Poster to the concerts in Hanley
- Location: UK, Europe
- Start date: 29 September 1963
- End date: 3 November 1963
- Legs: 1
- No. of shows: 60

the Rolling Stones concert chronology
- British Tour 1963; 1st British Tour 1964

The Rolling Stones' first concert tour was a "package tour" headlined by the Everly Brothers and Bo Diddley, presented by Don Arden, compered by British comedian Bob Bain. From the Watford date onwards, the Everly Brothers were augmented (NOT replaced) by Little Richard. The tour commenced on 29 September and concluded on 3 November 1963. They performed two ten-minute shows at every date.

Other acts of the tour were Mickie Most (promoting "Mister Porter"), The Flintstones and Julie Grant ("Up on the Roof", "Count on Me").

== Tour musicians ==
- The Everly Brothers
- Bo Diddley
- Little Richard
- Mickie Most
- Julie Grant
- The Flintstones

The Rolling Stones

- Mick Jagger – lead vocals, harmonica
- Keith Richards – guitar, backing vocals
- Brian Jones – guitar, harmonica, backing vocals
- Bill Wyman – bass guitar, backing vocals
- Charlie Watts – drums, percussion
- Ian Stewart – Piano

== Tour set list ==
Songs performed by the Rolling Stones include:

- "Poison Ivy"
- "Fortune Teller"
- "Come On"
- "Money"
- "Route 66"
- "Roll Over Beethoven"
- "Memphis Tennessee"

== Tour dates ==
Date	City	Country	Venue
29 September 1963	London	England	New Victoria Theatre
1 October 1963	London	England	Odeon Theatre
2 October 1963	London	England	Regal Theatre
3 October 1963	Southend-on-Sea	England	Odeon Theatre
4 October 1963	Guildford	England	Odeon Theatre
5 October 1963	Watford	England	Gaumont Theatre
6 October 1963	Cardiff	Wales	Capitol Theatre
8 October 1963	Cheltenham	England	Odeon Theatre
9 October 1963	Worcester	England	Gaumont Theatre
10 October 1963	Wolverhampton	England	Gaumont Theatre
11 October 1963	Derby	England	Gaumont Theatre
12 October 1963	Doncaster	England	Gaumont Theatre
13 October 1963	Liverpool	England	Odeon Theatre
16 October 1963	Manchester	England	Odeon Theatre
17 October 1963	Glasgow	Scotland	Odeon Theatre
18 October 1963	Newcastle upon Tyne	England	Odeon Theatre
19 October 1963	Bradford	England	Gaumont Theatre
20 October 1963	Hanley	England	Gaumont Theatre
22 October 1963	Sheffield	England	Gaumont Theatre
23 October 1963	Nottingham	England	Odeon Theatre
24 October 1963	Birmingham	England	Odeon Theatre
25 October 1963	Taunton	England	Gaumont Theatre
26 October 1963	Bournemouth	England	Gaumont Theatre
27 October 1963	Salisbury	England	Gaumont Theatre
29 October 1963	Southampton	England	Gaumont Theatre
30 October 1963	St Albans	England	Odeon Theatre
31 October 1963	London	England	Odeon Theatre
1 November 1963	Rochester	England	Odeon Theatre
2 November 1963	Ipswich	England	Gaumont Theatre
3 November 1963	London	England	Hammersmith Odeon

== See also ==
- List of The Rolling Stones concert tours
