= The Rolling Stones 4th British Tour 1964 =

1964 concert tour by the Rolling Stones

- Continental tour by the Rolling Stones
- Poster to the Odeon Theatre concerts in London. A similar layout was used for other events.
- Location: UK, Europe
- Associated album: The Rolling Stones
- Start date: 5 September 1964
- End date: 11 October 1964
- Legs: 1
- No. of shows: 64

the Rolling Stones concert chronology
- 3rd British Tour 1964; 4th British Tour 1964; 2nd American Tour 1964

The Rolling Stones' 1964 4th British Tour was a concert tour by the band. The tour commenced on September 5 and concluded on October 11, 1964.

== The Rolling Stones ==
- Mick Jagger – lead vocals, harmonica, percussion
- Keith Richards – guitar, backing vocals
- Brian Jones – guitar, harmonica, backing vocals
- Bill Wyman – bass guitar, backing vocals
- Charlie Watts – drums

== Tour set list ==
1. "Not Fade Away"
2. "I Just Want to Make Love to You"
3. "Walking the Dog"
4. "If You Need Me"
5. "Around and Around"
6. "I'm a King Bee"
7. "I'm Alright"
8. "It's All Over Now"

== Tour dates ==
- 05/09/1964 London, Finsbury Park, Astoria Theatre (2 shows)
- 06/09/1964 Leicester, Odeon Theatre (2 shows)
- 08/09/1964 Colchester, Odeon Theatre (2 shows)
- 09/09/1964 Luton, Odeon Theatre (2 shows)
- 10/09/1964 Cheltenham, Odeon Theatre (2 shows)
- 11/09/1964 Cardiff, Wales, Capitol Theatre (2 shows)
- 13/09/1964 Liverpool, Empire Theatre (2 shows)
- 14/09/1964 Chester, ABC Theatre (2 shows)
- 15/09/1964 Manchester, Odeon Theatre (2 shows)
- 16/09/1964 Wigan, ABC Theatre (2 shows)
- 17/09/1964 Carlisle, ABC Theatre (2 shows)
- 18/09/1964 Newcastle upon Tyne, Odeon Theatre (2 shows)
- 19/09/1964 Edinburgh, Scotland, Usher Hall (2 shows)
- 20/09/1964 Stockton-on-Tees, ABC Theatre (2 shows)
- 21/09/1964 Kingston-upon-Hull, ABC Theatre (2 shows)
- 22/09/1964 Lincoln, ABC Theatre (2 shows)
- 24/09/1964 Doncaster, Gaumont Theatre (2 shows)
- 25/09/1964 Hanley, Gaumont Theatre (2 shows)
- 26/09/1964 Bradford, Gaumont Theatre (2 shows)
- 27/09/1964 Birmingham, Hippodrome Theatre (2 shows)
- 28/09/1964 Romford, Odeon Theatre (2 shows)
- 29/09/1964 Guildford, Odeon Theatre (2 shows)
- 01/10/1964 Bristol, Colston Hall (2 shows)
- 02/10/1964 Exeter, Odeon Theatre (2 shows)
- 03/10/1964 London, Edmonton, Regal Theatre (2 shows)
- 04/10/1964 Southampton, Gaumont Theatre (2 shows)
- 05/10/1964 Wolverhampton, Gaumont Theatre (2 shows)
- 06/10/1964 Watford, Gaumont Theatre (2 shows)
- 08/10/1964 London, Lewisham, Odeon Theatre (2 shows)
- 09/10/1964 Ipswich, Gaumont Theatre (2 shows)
- 10/10/1964 Southend, Odeon Theatre (2 shows)
- 11/10/1964 Brighton, Hippodrome (2 shows)
