= Johnny Winter (album) =

1969 studio album by Johnny Winter

Studio album by Johnny Winter
- Released: April 15, 1969
- Recorded: Nashville, February–March, 1969
- Genre: Blues rock
- Length: 33:35
- Label: Columbia
- Producer: Johnny Winter

Johnny Winter chronology
| The Progressive Blues Experiment (1969) | Johnny Winter (1969) | Second Winter (1969) |

Professional ratings
Review scores
| Source | Rating |
|---|---|
| AllMusic | 4.5/5 stars |
| The Penguin Guide to Blues Recordings | 3/4 stars |
| PopMatters | Favorable |
| Rolling Stone | Negative |
| Sputnikmusic | 5/5 stars |

Johnny Winter is Johnny Winter's second studio album. Columbia Records released the album in 1969, after signing Winter to the label for a reported $600,000. As with his first album, The Progressive Blues Experiment, Winter mixes some original compositions with songs originally recorded by blues artists. The album reached number 24 on the Billboard 200 albums chart.

== Track listing ==
1. "I'm Yours & I'm Hers" (Johnny Winter) – 4:27
2. "Be Careful with a Fool" (Joe Josea, B.B. King) – 5:15
3. "Dallas" (Johnny Winter) – 2:45
4. "Mean Mistreater" (James Gordon) – 3:53
5. "Leland Mississippi Blues" (Johnny Winter) – 3:19
6. "Good Morning Little School Girl" – (Don Level, Bob Love) – 2:45
7. "When You Got a Good Friend" (Robert Johnson) – 3:30
8. "I'll Drown in My Tears" (Henry Glover) – 4:44
9. "Back Door Friend" (Lightnin' Hopkins, Stan Lewis) – 2:57

2004 reissue bonus tracks

10. "Country Girl" (B.B. King) – 3:08
11. "Dallas" (Johnny Winter) – 3:37
12. "Two Steps from the Blues" (John Riley Brown, Deadric Malone) – 2:35

== Personnel ==
- Johnny Winter – lead guitar, slide guitar, harmonica, vocals
- "Uncle" John Turner – drums, percussion
- Tommy Shannon – bass
- Edgar Winter – piano on "I'll Drown in My Tears", alto saxophone on "Good Morning Little School Girl"
- Elsie Senter – backing vocals on "I'll Drown in My Tears"
- Carrie Hossell – backing vocals on "I'll Drown in My Tears"
- Peggy Bowers – backing vocals on "I'll Drown in My Tears"
- Stephen Ralph Sefsik – alto saxophone on "I'll Drown in My Tears"
- Norman Ray – baritone saxophone on "I'll Drown in My Tears"
- Walter "Shakey" Horton – harmonica on "Mean Mistreater"
- Willie Dixon – acoustic bass on "Mean Mistreater"
- Karl Garvin – trumpet on "Good Morning Little School Girl"
- A. Wynn Butler – tenor saxophone on "Good Morning Little School Girl"

=== Production ===
- Johnny Winter – producer
- Eddie Kramer – production consultant
- Marvin Devonish – production assistant
- Charlie Bragg, Ed Hudson, Neil Wilburn – engineers
- Steve Paul – spiritual producer
