= The Rolling Stones European Tour 1967 =

1967 concert tour by the Rolling Stones

- Continental tour by the Rolling Stones
- Poster to the concert in Bremen, West-Germany
- Location: Europe
- Associated album: Between the Buttons
- Start date: 25 March 1967
- End date: 17 April 1967
- No. of shows: 27

the Rolling Stones concert chronology
- British Tour 1966; European Tour 1967; Hyde Park Festival 1969

The Rolling Stones' 1967 European Tour was a concert tour by the band to promote their new album Between the Buttons and new single "Let's Spend the Night Together" / "Ruby Tuesday".

== History ==
The tour commenced on 25 March and concluded on 17 April 1967. It was the last Rolling Stones concert tour to include Brian Jones, who initially formed and named the band.

This tour would also be one of the first times a rock band from Western Europe performed in Eastern Europe, when on 13 April, they played two shows at the Palace of Culture and Science in Warsaw, Poland. The people who did attend were told to behave accordingly during the concert or they would be removed from the venue, however, a riot started. Visiting Soviet officials were not pleased by the Rolling Stones performance and it would be a long while before the Stones would return to the Eastern Bloc nations. "They thought the show was so awful, so decadent, that they said this would never happen in Moscow," said Jagger.

== Personnel ==
- Mick Jagger – lead vocals
- Keith Richards – guitar, backing vocals
- Brian Jones – guitar, harmonica, electric dulcimer, recorder, organ
- Bill Wyman – bass guitar, backing vocals
- Charlie Watts – drums

== Set list ==
1. "The Last Time"
2. "Paint It Black"
3. "19th Nervous Breakdown"
4. "Lady Jane"
5. "Get Off of My Cloud"/"Yesterday's Papers"
6. "Under My Thumb"
7. "Ruby Tuesday"
8. "Let's Spend the Night Together"
9. "Goin' Home"
10. "(I Can't Get No) Satisfaction"

== Tour dates ==
Date	City	Country	Venue
25 March 1967; 2 shows	Helsingborg	Sweden	Idrottens Hus
27 March 1967; 2 shows	Örebro	Sweden	Vinterstadion
29 March 1967; 2 shows	Bremen	West Germany	Stadthalle
30 March 1967; 2 shows	Cologne	West Germany	Sporthalle
31 March 1967	Dortmund	West Germany	Westfalenhalle
1 April 1967; 2 shows	Hamburg	West Germany	Ernst-Merck-Halle
2 April 1967; 2 shows	Vienna	Austria	Stadthalle
5 April 1967; 2 shows	Bologna	Italy	Palazzo Dello Sport
6 April 1967; 2 shows	Rome	Italy	Palazzo Dello Sport
8 April 1967; 2 shows	Milan	Italy	Palalido
9 April 1967; 2 shows	Genova	Italy	Palazzo Dello Sport
11 April 1967; 2 shows	Paris	France	L'Olympia
13 April 1967; 2 shows	Warsaw	Poland	Palace of Culture and Science, Congress Hall
14 April 1967	Zürich	Switzerland	Hallenstadion
15 April 1967	The Hague	Netherlands	Houtrusthallen
17 April 1967	Athens	Greece	Leoforos Alexandras Stadium

== Supporting acts ==
Including: the Easybeats, the Creation, the Batman (Didi & the ABC Boys), & Achim Reichel (Ex-Rattles), the Move, Czerwono-Czarni (Warsaw), Stormy Six (Italy), Lucas (Sweden, Helsingborg).
