= Brighton Hippodrome =

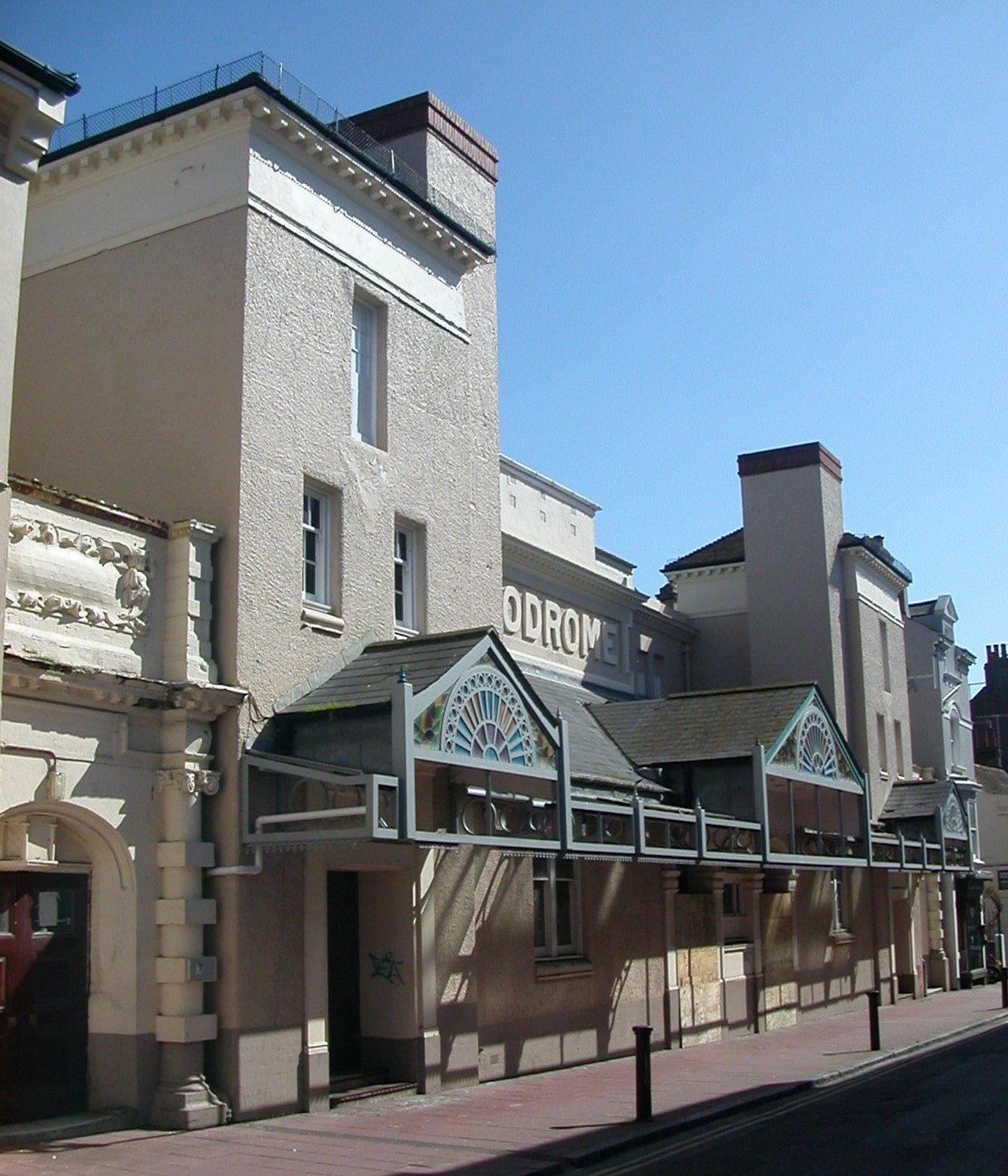
- The façade of the Brighton Hippodrome from the northwest

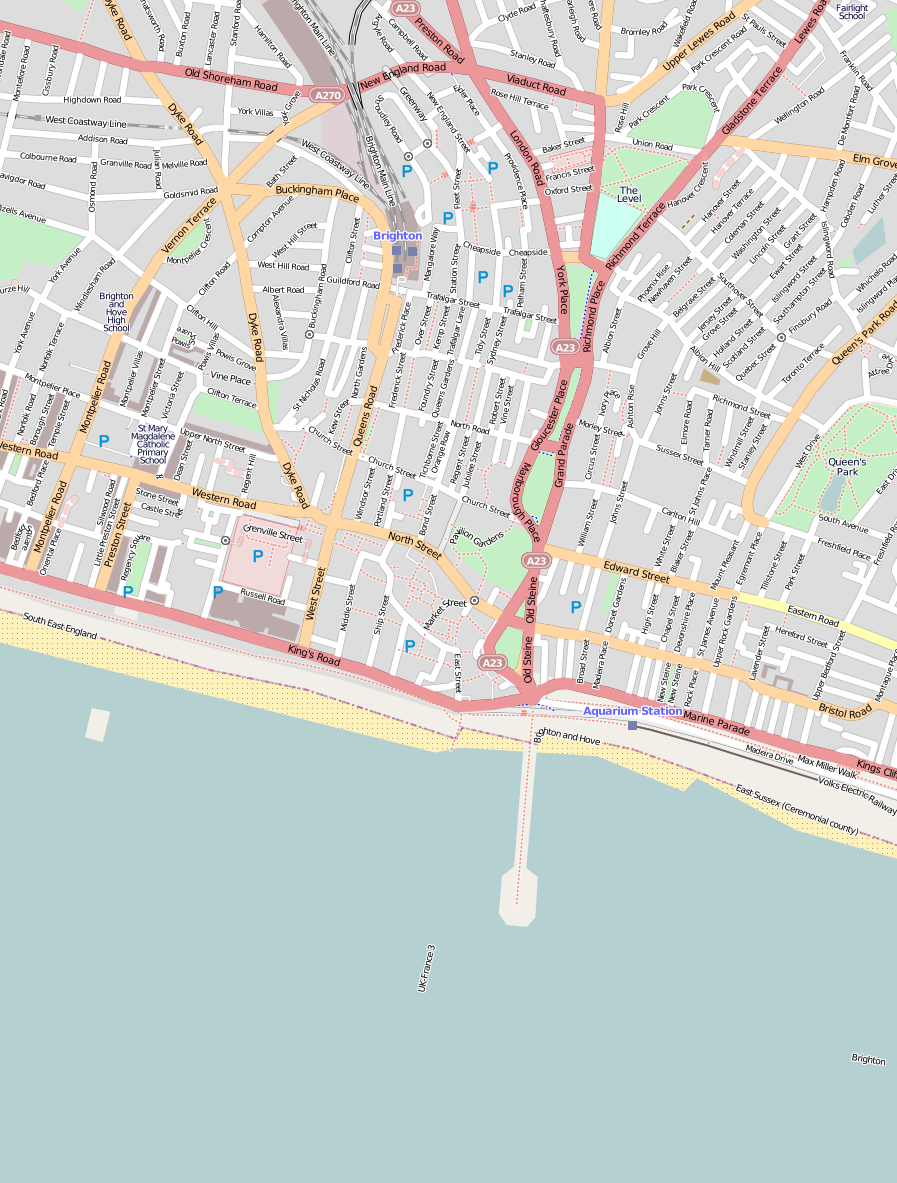
- Location within central Brighton
- 50.8218°N 0.1427°W
- Location: 52–58 Middle Street, Brighton, Brighton and Hove, East Sussex, United Kingdom

History
- Built: 1897
- Rebuilt: 1901; 1939

Site notes
- Architect: Frank Matcham (1901)

Listed Building – Grade II*
- Official name: Mecca Bingo (Former Hippodrome), 52–58 Middle Street
- Designated: 20 December 1985
- Reference no.: 1381793

Brighton Hippodrome is an inactive entertainment venue in Brighton, England. It was built in 1897 and closed in 2007.

The Hippodrome has hosted an ice rink, circus acts, variety theatre, vaudeville shows and bands such as the Beatles and the Rolling Stones. The flamboyantly decorated interior, with a large auditorium and Rococo embellishments, has survived.

In July 2010, the owner announced that it would cost £9 million to restore the building and convert it into a live music venue, and a charitable trust expressed concern over its future. Since 2011, several plans have been submitted to convert the building for alternative uses. English Heritage has listed the building at Grade II* for its architectural and historical importance.

== History ==
=== 1890s: Construction ===
By the end of the 19th century, Brighton had been a fashionable and thriving seaside resort, which had experienced rapid growth, for more than 100 years. It developed around the medieval fishing village of Brighthelmstone—a grid of streets running inland from the sea, intercut with narrow twittens. Middle Street, the most important and central of these streets, was built up from the 16th century, and was lined with houses both large and small, inns, the town's oldest school and a richly decorated synagogue.

Land on the east side of the street was chosen as the site of the Real Ice Skating Rink in 1897. It was designed by the architect Lewis Karslake and had a long stuccoed façade with short towers at each end. The venture was unsuccessful, as ice skating did not gain popularity.

=== 1900s—1930s: Circus and variety theatre ===
In 1900, the owners converted the venue into a circus. Frank Matcham, a prolific theatre architect, was engaged to enlarge and rebuild the interior. The building was renamed the Hippodrome and reopened in its new form in 1901. The following year the circus failed and the site was auctioned. It was bought by theatre entrepreneur Thomas Barrasford who commissioned architect Bertie Crewe to modify the auditorium, replacing the circus ring with seating, and on 22 December 1902 the Hippodrome reopened as a variety theatre.

Barrasford died at the venue in February 1910 and the Hippodrome was sold to the Variety Theatres Controlling Company (VTCC). It quickly became Brighton's most important variety theatre. Shows of all types were staged there, and top-name entertainers such as Harry Houdini, W C Fields, Lillie Langtry, Sarah Bernhardt, Bill "Bojangles" Robinson, Gracie Fields, Laurel and Hardy and Sammy Davis Jr. appeared. Laurence Olivier made his professional stage début—but fell over on his first entrance. One of Charlie Chaplin's first roles was a bit-part in theatre impresario Fred Karno's comedy Saturday to Monday, staged in May 1907; and Vivien Leigh gave an acclaimed performance in George Bernard Shaw's play The Doctor's Dilemma in January 1942. Local stars also featured: Max Miller, the Brighton-born music hall entertainer and comedian, appeared on many occasions between 1928 and 1960; and the conjoined twins Daisy and Violet Hilton, whose vaudeville career began in their home town in 1911 at the age of three, topped the bill with their variety show.

The venue's early success led to expansion. In 1919 the lower floors of the two houses on the north side, known as Hippodrome House since Barrasford made his home there in 1902, was converted into a Palm Court for teas and dances. Its maximum capacity may have been up to 3,000 although an attendance of 4,500 was recorded on one occasion. Further changes of ownership in 1928 and 1932 made the Hippodrome part of the Moss Empires circuit.

=== Postwar: concerts and bingo ===
After World War II, the popularity of variety theatre waned, and the new practice of centralised booking of productions by an agency in London meant that the tastes of Brighton audiences were not specifically catered for: the venue typically received shows that had toured around the country and had no local connection. The Hippodrome accordingly hosted variety shows starring such stars as Petula Clark in 1958 as well as concerts and other large-scale events: concerts by the Beatles (part of their 1964 World Tour) and the Rolling Stones (on their 4th British Tour 1964) in October 1964. This could not stop the decline, though, and on 22 November 1964 the theatre was closed. Brighton Corporation considered acquisition but the idea lapsed. In 1966 it was converted into a short-lived television and film studio. In 1967, it was turned into a Mecca Bingo hall; the conversion work included the insertion of a raised floor above the stage and through the proscenium arch. Mecca was bought by the Rank Organisation in 1990.

=== 2006—present: Closure and redevelopment proposals ===
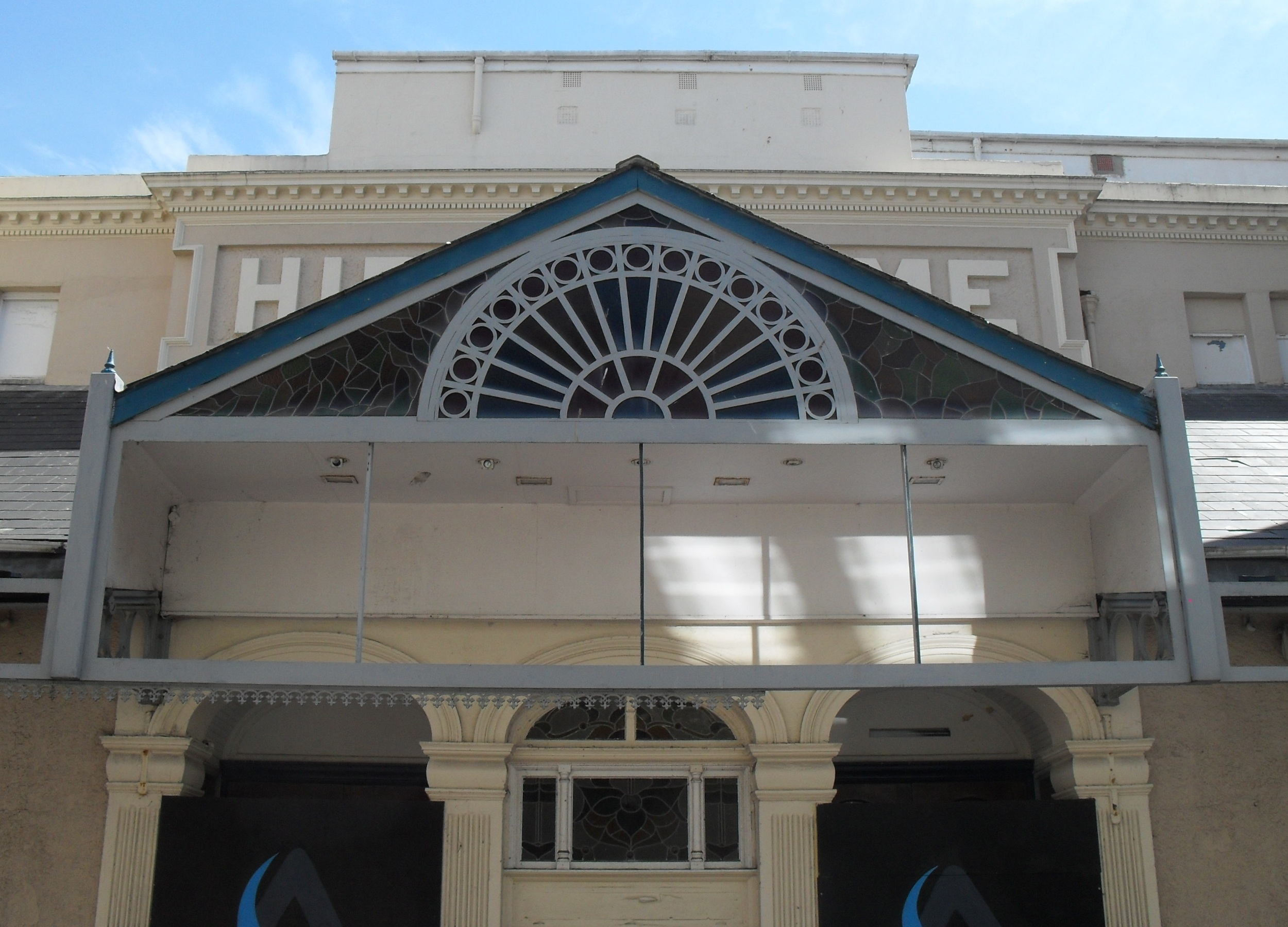
The glazed awning spans the façade. The three-arched main entrance is visible below this section.

Repairs were carried out on the coloured glass awnings above the entrance in the early 1990s. The building closed as a bingo hall in August 2006 and is still empty as of 2026. In 2003, the property investment firm London Merchant Securities (later called Cheval Properties) bought it and leased it to Academy Music Group (AMG), who planned to work with events company Live Nation to establish a live music venue in it. In July 2010, AMG announced that this would probably cost at least £9 million: suitable soundproofing in the narrow, partly residential street would cost about £3 million, and the deteriorating structural condition meant repair work would be difficult and expensive. Initial analysis work cost £1/2 million. The Theatres Trust, the statutory advisory body on theatre conservation, placed the Hippodrome on its register of "buildings requiring special attention" in 2009; on a list of 82 theatres in Britain, it was placed in the top ten at highest risk. It was number one on the list in 2013 and the following three years.

Brighton and Hove City Council stated in October 2011 that AMG had met officers from the licensing and planning departments in an attempt to move the situation forward. Four months later, Live Nation announced its intention to seek planning permission to convert the building into "one of the city’s main live music venues", at an estimated cost of £9 million. By this time the company had spent at least £100,000 on structural and other surveys. Nothing came of these plans, though, and in February 2013 another group—Alaska Development Consultants—unveiled an £18 million plan to turn the Hippodrome into an eight-screen cinema. Five new shops and a public square would be part of the plans, and the building would be connected to an adjacent shopping arcade. Local firm Russ Drage Architects drew up the plans. A local and national campaign, preferring the building to be used for live theatre or similar events, protested against the plans; but by January 2014 Alaska Development Consultants' proposals had evolved into a £35 million scheme including a restaurant on a removable floor above the auditorium. English Heritage announced their support for these plans in April 2014, and in November 2014 the city council's planning department gave final approval. The site, together with the contiguous Dukes Lane shopping street, was immediately put on the market. In April 2015, AMG acquired the freehold and offered campaigners a six-month moratorium to develop plans for restoration. Work to achieve restoration continues.

Under the name Mecca Bingo, 52–58 Middle Street, the building was listed at Grade II* on 20 December 1985; such buildings are defined as being "particularly important ... [and] of more than special interest". As of February 2001, it was one of 70 Grade II*-listed buildings and structures, and 1,218 listed buildings of all grades, in the city of Brighton and Hove.

The building is currently under renovation, and it has been confirmed that the Academy Music Group will operate the venue when it reopens, once again as a concert hall, with an increased capacity of 2,300.

== Architecture ==
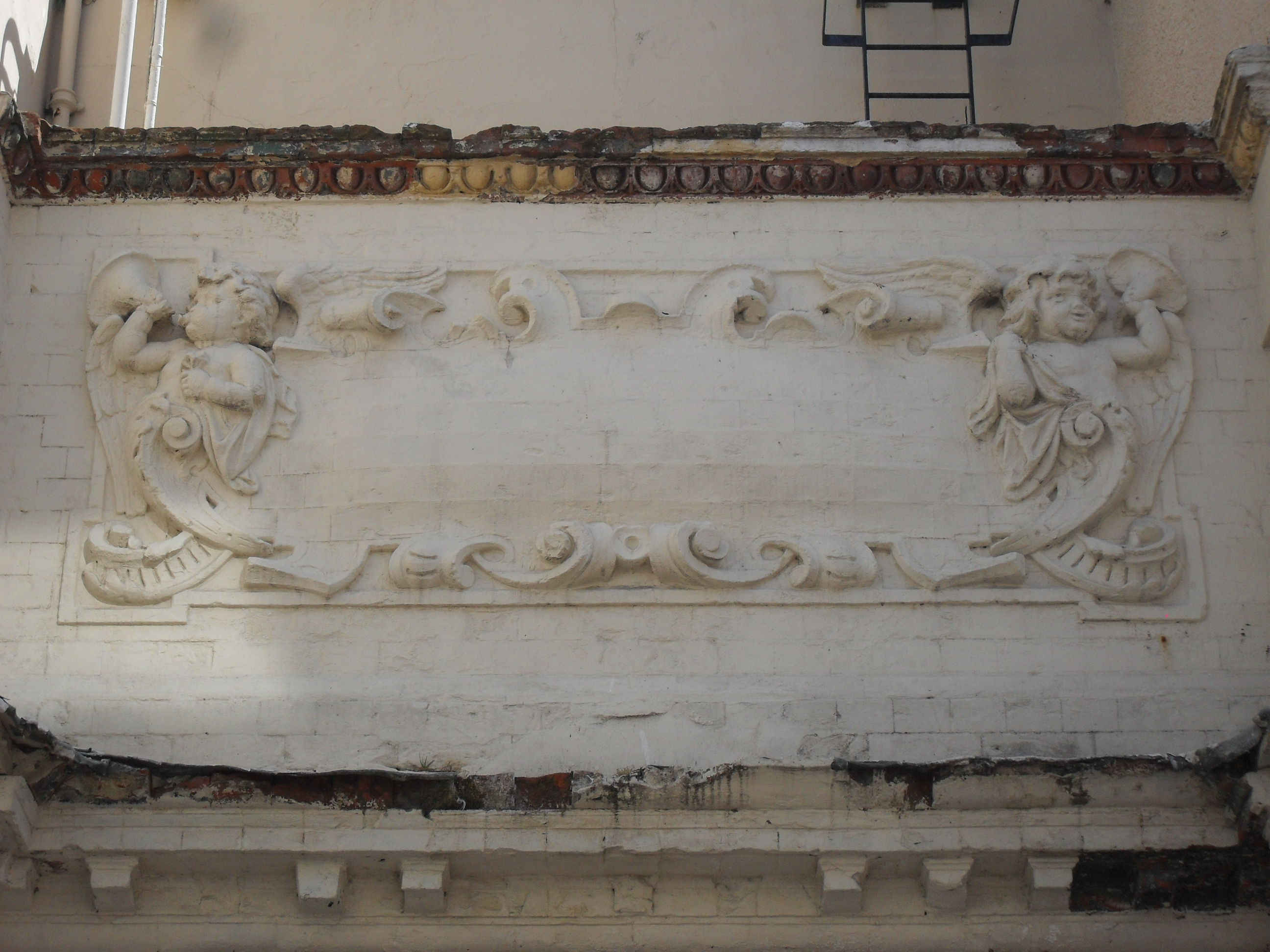
Elaborate scrollwork and putti decorate the cartouches above the outer entrances.

The exterior of the former Hippodrome is in three parts and is stuccoed, but there is apparently brickwork, terracotta and stone underneath. The original (1897) section is symmetrical, but the extension northwards in 1939 took in two houses which make the composition unbalanced. The central section has a stepped pediment above a dentil cornice and a rectangular panel with the letters hippodrome projecting. Below this, a three-part awning projects as a lean-to, forming a low roof. This obscures the centre bay, which has three arches with entrances below. The middle entrance has a porch flanked by fluted pilasters and topped by an entablature with a pulvinated (convex) frieze. The arch has a decorative archivolt. Between the porch and the two plain outer entrances in the centre bay are single straight-headed windows divided into two lights by a single mullion.

A pair of short towers stand alongside the centre bay. They each have a simple straight-headed entrance with pilasters, a cornice and a pediment at ground-floor level, and two more windows and a door above. A wide dentil cornice runs around each tower, and on the inside an extra section projects inwards and upwards beyond the cornice line. Elaborate single-storey entrance bays flank the towers, with chamfered arches, ornate mouldings, Ionic columns and a cornice. Above the frieze is a scroll-moulded cartouche which is framed by the upper sections of the columns.

Inside, much of Frank Matcham's original work remains, and the design is considered to be one of his finest and to display "his hallmark decorative richness". A narrow foyer leads to an auditorium shaped like a horseshoe, with seats arranged in a circle around it and in front of the stage. Above this is a proscenium arch featuring elaborate Rococo-style moulded plasterwork showing dolphins and female figures, and with egg-and-dart decoration to the architrave. Above the auditorium is an intricately patterned dome, and there are Indo-Saracenic-style onion domes on top of the two-part stage-boxes—evoking the style of the nearby Royal Pavilion. The stage and proscenium arch are now partly obscured by the new floor inserted in 1967. More Rococo decoration is found on the panelled segmented ceiling, from which a large lantern also hangs. The newer rooms on the northern side, all decorated in an elaborate Middle Eastern style, include a conservatory and bars.

== See also ==
- Grade II* listed buildings in Brighton and Hove

== Bibliography ==
- Antram, Nicholas; Morrice, Richard (2008). Brighton and Hove. Pevsner Architectural Guides. London: Yale University Press. ISBN 978-0-300-12661-7.
- Brighton Polytechnic. School of Architecture and Interior Design (1987). A Guide to the Buildings of Brighton. Macclesfield: McMillan Martin. ISBN 1-869865-03-0.
- Collis, Rose (2010). The New Encyclopaedia of Brighton. (based on the original by Tim Carder) (1st ed.). Brighton: Brighton & Hove Libraries. ISBN 978-0-9564664-0-2.
- Dale, Antony (1950). The History and Architecture of Brighton. Brighton: Bredin & Heginbothom Ltd.
- Dale, Antony (1967) [1947]. Fashionable Brighton 1820–1860 (2nd ed.). Newcastle-upon-Tyne: Oriel Press Ltd. ISBN 0-85362-028-8.
- Musgrave, Clifford (1981). Life in Brighton. Rochester: Rochester Press. ISBN 0-571-09285-3.
