= The Rolling Stones 1965 tours =

The Rolling Stones had eleven concert tours in 1965. The tours are combined here to present a year-long view of the band's activity.

== Personnel ==
- Mick Jagger – lead vocals, harmonica
- Keith Richards – guitar, backing vocals
- Brian Jones – guitar, harmonica, backing vocals
- Bill Wyman – bass guitar, backing vocals
- Charlie Watts – drums, percussion

== Irish Tour 1965 ==
The Rolling Stones Irish Tour 1965
- Continental tour by the Rolling Stones
- Location: Europe
- Associated album: The Rolling Stones No. 2
- Start date: 6 January 1965
- End date: 8 January 1965
- Legs: 1
- No. of shows: 6

The Rolling Stones' 1965 Irish Tour was the first concert tour of Ireland by The Rolling Stones. The tour commenced on January 6 and concluded on January 8, 1965.

=== Irish Tour dates ===
Date	City	Country	Venue
6 January 1965; 2 shows	Belfast	Northern Ireland	ABC Theatre
7 January 1965; 2 shows	Dublin	Ireland	Adelphi Theatre
8 January 1965; 2 shows	Cork	Ireland	Savoy Theatre

== Far East Tour 1965 ==
The Rolling Stones Far East Tour 1965
- Tour by the Rolling Stones
- Location: Asia; Oceania
- Associated album: The Rolling Stones No. 2
- Start date: 22 January 1965
- End date: 16 February 1965
- No. of shows: 36

The Rolling Stones' 1965 Far East Tour was the first concert tour of Oceania by the band. The tour commenced on 22 January and concluded on 16 February 1965.

This series of concerts was a package tour with Roy Orbison, The Newbeats, and Ray Columbus & the Invaders, and was promoted by Harry M. Miller. In Australia, there were different local support acts in each city.

Parts of the Sydney leg of the tour were filmed by Movietone News and screened in cinemas. Footage in Stones Roll Down Under included their arrival at Sydney Airport, part of the airport press conference and part of the performance of "Not Fade Away" from their first Sydney show.

=== Far East Tour dates ===
Date	City	Country	Venue
22 January 1965; 2 shows	Sydney	Australia	Manufacturer's Auditorium, Agricultural Hall
23 January 1965; 3 shows	Sydney	Australia	Manufacturer's Auditorium, Agricultural Hall
25 January 1965; 2 shows	Brisbane	Australia	Brisbane City Hall
26 January 1965; 2 shows	Brisbane	Australia	Brisbane City Hall
27 January 1965; 2 shows	Sydney	Australia	Manufacturer's Auditorium, Agricultural Hall
28 January 1965; 2 shows	Melbourne	Australia	Palais Theatre
29 January 1965; 3 shows	Melbourne	Australia	Palais Theatre
1 February 1965; 2 shows	Christchurch	New Zealand	Theatre Royal
2 February 1965; 2 shows	Invercargill	New Zealand	Civic Theatre
3 February 1965; 2 shows	Dunedin	New Zealand	Dunedin Town Hall
6 February 1965; 2 shows	Auckland	New Zealand	Auckland Town Hall
8 February 1965; 2 shows	Wellington	New Zealand	Wellington Town Hall
10 February 1965; 2 shows	Melbourne	Australia	Palais Theatre
11 February 1965; 2 shows	Adelaide	Australia	Adelaide Showgrounds
12 February 1965; 2 shows	Adelaide	Australia	Adelaide Showgrounds
13 February 1965; 3 shows	Perth	Australia	Capitol Theatre
16 February 1965; 2 shows	Singapore	Malaysia	Singapore Badminton Stadium

== 1st British Tour 1965 ==
The Rolling Stones 1st British Tour 1965
- Continental tour by the Rolling Stones
- Location: UK, Europe
- Associated album: The Rolling Stones No. 2
- Start date: 5 March 1965
- End date: 18 March 1965
- No. of shows: 28

The Rolling Stones' 1965 1st British Tour commenced on March 5 and concluded on March 18, 1965.

Parts of the Liverpool (March 6) and Manchester (March 7) shows were recorded for Got Live If You Want It!—the third official EP by The Rolling Stones.

=== 1st British Tour dates ===
Date	City	Country	Venue
5 March 1965; 2 shows	London	England	Edmonton, Regal Theatre
6 March 1965; 2 shows	Liverpool	England	Liverpool Empire Theatre
7 March 1965; 2 shows	Manchester	England	Palace Theatre
8 March 1965; 2 shows	Scarborough	England	Futurist Theatre
9 March 1965; 2 shows	Sunderland	England	Odeon Theatre
10 March 1965; 2 shows	Huddersfield	England	ABC Theatre
11 March 1965; 2 shows	Sheffield	England	Sheffield City Hall
12 March 1965; 2 shows	Leicester	England	Leicester Trocadero
13 March 1965; 2 shows	Rugby	England	Granada Theatre
14 March 1965; 2 shows	Rochester	England	Odeon Theatre
15 March 1965; 2 shows	Guildford	England	Odeon Theatre
16 March 1965; 2 shows	Greenford	England	Granada Theatre
17 March 1965; 2 shows	Southend-on-Sea	England	Odeon Theatre
18 March 1965; 2 shows	Romford	England	ABC Theatre

== 1st European Tour 1965 ==
The Rolling Stones 1st European Tour 1965
- Continental tour by the Rolling Stones
- Location: Europe
- Associated album: The Rolling Stones No. 2
- Start date: 26 March 1965
- End date: 1 April 1965
- No. of shows: 11

The Rolling Stones' 1965 1st European Tour was the first concert tour of Scandinavia by the band. The tour commenced on March 26 and concluded on April 1, 1965.

=== Tour set list ===
1. "Everybody Needs Somebody to Love"
2. "Tell Me"
3. "Around and Around"
4. "Time Is on My Side"
5. "It's All Over Now"
6. "Little Red Rooster"
7. "(Get Your Kicks on) Route 66"
8. "The Last Time"

=== 1st European Tour dates ===
Date	City	Country	Venue
26 March 1965; 2 shows	Odense	Denmark	Fyns Forum
28 March 1965; 2 shows	Copenhagen	Denmark	Tivoli Gardens
30 March 1965; 2 shows	Copenhagen	Denmark	Tivoli Gardens
31 March 1965; 2 shows	Gothenburg	Sweden	Mässhallen
1 April 1965	Stockholm	Sweden	Kungliga tennishallen
2 April 1965	Stockholm	Sweden	Kungliga tennishallen

== 2nd European Tour 1965 ==
The Rolling Stones 2nd European Tour 1965
- National tour by the Rolling Stones
- Location: France, Europe
- Associated album: The Rolling Stones No. 2
- Start date: 16 April 1965
- End date: 18 April 1965
- No. of shows: 3

The Rolling Stones' 1965 2nd European Tour was the first concert tour of France by the band. The tour commenced on April 16 and concluded on April 18, 1965.

=== Tour set list ===
1. "Everybody Needs Somebody to Love" (intro)
2. "Around and Around"
3. "Off the Hook"
4. "Time Is on My Side"
5. "Carol"
6. "It's All Over Now"
7. "Little Red Rooster"
8. "Route 66"
9. "Everybody Needs Somebody to Love" (full song)
10. "The Last Time"
11. "I'm Alright"
12. "Hey Crawdaddy"

=== 2nd European Tour dates ===
Date	City	Country	Venue
16 April 1965	Paris	France	L'Olympia
17 April 1965	Paris	France	L'Olympia
18 April 1965	Paris	France	L'Olympia

== 1st American Tour 1965 ==
The Rolling Stones 1st American Tour 1965
- Continental tour by the Rolling Stones
- Location: North America
- Associated album: The Rolling Stones, Now!
- Start date: 23 April 1965
- End date: 29 May 1965
- No. of shows: 22

The Rolling Stones' 1965 1st American Tour commenced on April 23 and concluded on May 29, 1965. It was actually their third American tour, having toured the US twice in 1964. This tour included their first concert dates in Canada. On this tour, the band supported their album The Rolling Stones, Now!.

=== 1st American Tour dates ===
Date	City	Country	Venue
23 April 1965	Montreal, Quebec	Canada	Maurice Richard Arena
24 April 1965	Ottawa, Ontario	Canada	Ottawa Auditorium
25 April 1965	Toronto, Ontario	Canada	Maple Leaf Gardens
26 April 1965	London, Ontario	Canada	Treasure Island Gardens
29 April 1965; 2 shows	Albany, New York	United States	Palace Theatre
30 April 1965	Worcester, Massachusetts	United States	Worcester Memorial Auditorium
1 May 1965	New York City, New York	United States	Academy of Music
1 May 1965	Philadelphia, Pennsylvania	United States	Convention Hall
4 May 1965	Statesboro, Georgia	United States	Georgia Southern College, Hanner Gymnasium
6 May 1965	Clearwater, Florida	United States	Jack Russell Stadium
7 May 1965	Birmingham, Alabama	United States	Legion Field
8 May 1965	Jacksonville, Florida	United States	Jacksonville Coliseum
9 May 1965	Chicago	United States	Arie Crown Theater
14 May 1965	San Francisco	United States	Civic Auditorium
15 May 1965	San Bernardino, California	United States	Swing Auditorium
16 May 1965	Long Beach, California	United States	Civic Auditorium
17 May 1965	San Diego	United States	Golden Hall
21 May 1965	San Jose, California	United States	San Jose Civic Auditorium
22 May 1965	Fresno, California	United States	Ratcliffe Stadium
22 May 1965	Sacramento, California	United States	Memorial Auditorium
29 May 1965; 3 shows	New York City	United States	Academy of Music

=== Tour set list ===
Songs performed include:

- Not Fade Away
- (Get Your Kicks on) Route 66
- Off the Hook
- Little Red Rooster
- Come On
- Play with Fire
- Pain in My Heart
- It's All Over Now
- The Last Time

== 3rd European Tour 1965 ==
The Rolling Stones 3rd European Tour 1965
- Continental tour by the Rolling Stones
- Location: Europe
- Start date: 15 June 1965
- End date: 29 June 1965
- No. of shows: 15

the Rolling Stones concert chronology
- 1st American Tour 1965; 3rd European Tour 1965; 2nd Irish Tour 1965

The Rolling Stones' 1965 3rd European Tour commenced on June 15 and concluded on June 29, 1965.

=== Tour set list ===
Songs performed include:

- Not Fade Away
- (Get Your Kicks on) Route 66
- Off the Hook
- Little Red Rooster
- Come On
- Play with Fire
- Pain in My Heart
- It's All Over Now
- The Last Time
- I'm Moving On
- I'm Alright
- Around and Around
- Time Is on My Side
- Everybody Needs Somebody to Love

=== 3rd European Tour dates ===
Date	City	Country	Venue
15 June 1965 (2 shows)	Glasgow	Scotland	Odeon Theatre
16 June 1965 (2 shows)	Edinburgh	Scotland	Usher Hall
17 June 1965 (2 shows)	Aberdeen	Scotland	Capitol Theatre
18 June 1965 (2 shows)	Dundee	Scotland	Caird Hall
24 June 1965 (2 shows)	Oslo	Norway	Messehallen
25 June 1965	Porin maalaiskunta	Finland	Yyteri Beach
26 June 1965 (2 shows)	Copenhagen	Denmark	Falkoner Centret
29 June 1965 (2 shows)	Malmö	Sweden	Baltiska hallen

The Rolling Stones 2nd Irish Tour 1965
- Continental tour by the Rolling Stones
- Location: Europe
- Start date: 3 September 1965
- End date: 4 September 1965
- No. of shows: 2

== 2nd Irish Tour 1965 ==
The Rolling Stones' 1965 2nd Irish Tour commenced on September 3 and concluded on September 4, 1965.

This concert tour was featured in the documentary Charlie Is My Darling.

=== Tour set list ===
Songs performed include:

- "Everybody Needs Somebody to Love"
- "Pain in My Heart"
- "Around and Around"
- "Time Is on My Side"
- "I'm Moving On"
- "The Last Time"
- "(I Can't Get No) Satisfaction"
- "I'm Alright"

=== 2nd Irish Tour dates ===
Date	City	Country	Venue
3 September 1965 (2 shows)	Dublin	Ireland	Adelphi Theatre
4 September 1965 (2 shows)	Belfast	Northern Ireland	ABC Theatre

The Rolling Stones 4th European Tour 1965
- Continental tour by the Rolling Stones
- Location: Europe
- Start date: 11 September 1965
- End date: 17 September 1965
- No. of shows: 11

== 4th European Tour 1965 ==
The Rolling Stones' 1965 4th European Tour commenced on September 11 and concluded on September 17, 1965.

=== Tour set list ===
Songs performed include:

- "Everybody Needs Somebody to Love"
- "Pain in My Heart"
- "Around and Around"
- "Time Is on My Side"
- "I'm Moving On"
- "The Last Time"
- "(I Can't Get No) Satisfaction"
- "I'm Alright"

=== 4th European Tour dates ===
Date	City	Country	Venue
11 September 1965 (2 shows)	Münster	West Germany	Halle Münsterland
12 September 1965 (2 shows)	Essen	West Germany	Grugahalle
13 September 1965 (2 shows)	Hamburg	West Germany	Ernst-Merck-Halle
14 September 1965 (2 shows)	Munich	West Germany	Zirkus Krone-Bau
15 September 1965	West Berlin	West Germany	Waldbühne
17 September 1965	Vienna	Austria	Stadthalle

== 2nd British Tour 1965 ==
The Rolling Stones 2nd British Tour 1965
- Continental tour by the Rolling Stones
- Location: UK, Europe
- Start date: 24 September 1965
- End date: 17 October 1965
- No. of shows: 48

The Rolling Stones' 1965 2nd British Tour commenced on September 24 and concluded on October 17, 1965. The tour's start date coincided with the UK release date of the band's third album Out of Our Heads.

=== Tour set list ===
Songs performed include:

- "She Said Yeah"
- "Mercy, Mercy"
- "Hitch Hike"
- "Cry to Me"
- "The Last Time"
- "That's How Strong My Love Is"
- "I'm Moving On"
- "Talkin' 'bout You"
- "Oh Baby"
- "(I Can't Get No) Satisfaction"

=== 2nd British Tour dates ===
Date	City	Country	Venue
24 September 1965 (2 shows)	London	United Kingdom	Astoria Theatre
25 September 1965 (2 shows)	Southampton	United Kingdom	Gaumont Theatre
26 September 1965 (2 shows)	Bristol	United Kingdom	Colston Hall
27 September 1965 (2 shows)	Cheltenham	United Kingdom	Odeon Theatre
28 September 1965 (2 shows)	Cardiff	United Kingdom	Capitol Theatre
29 September 1965 (2 shows)	Shrewsbury	United Kingdom	Granada Theatre
30 September 1965 (2 shows)	Hanley	United Kingdom	Gaumont Theatre
1 October 1965 (2 shows)	Chester	United Kingdom	ABC Theatre
2 October 1965 (2 shows)	Wigan	United Kingdom	ABC Theatre
3 October 1965 (2 shows)	Manchester	United Kingdom	Odeon Theatre
4 October 1965 (2 shows)	Bradford	United Kingdom	Gaumont Theatre
5 October 1965 (2 shows)	Carlisle	United Kingdom	ABC Theatre
6 October 1965 (2 shows)	Glasgow	United Kingdom	Odeon Theatre
7 October 1965 (2 shows)	Newcastle	United Kingdom	City Hall
8 October 1965 (2 shows)	Stockton-on-Tees	United Kingdom	ABC Theatre
9 October 1965 (2 shows)	Leeds	United Kingdom	Odeon Theatre
10 October 1965 (2 shows)	Liverpool	United Kingdom	Empire Theatre
11 October 1965 (2 shows)	Sheffield	United Kingdom	Gaumont Theatre
12 October 1965 (2 shows)	Doncaster	United Kingdom	Gaumont Theatre
13 October 1965 (2 shows)	Leicester	United Kingdom	De Montfort Hall
14 October 1965 (2 shows)	Birmingham	United Kingdom	Odeon Theatre
15 October 1965 (2 shows)	Cambridge	United Kingdom	Regal Theatre
16 October 1965 (2 shows)	Northampton	United Kingdom	ABC Theatre
17 October 1965 (2 shows)	London	United Kingdom	Granada Theatre

The Rolling Stones 3rd American Tour 1965
- Continental tour by the Rolling Stones
- Location: North America
- Associated album: Out Of Our Heads
- Start date: 29 October 1965
- End date: 5 December 1965
- No. of shows: 41

== 2nd American Tour ==
The Rolling Stones' 2nd American Tour in 1965 was actually the Rolling Stones 4th American tour, having toured twice in 1964 and once earlier in 1965. The tour commenced on 29 October and concluded on 5 December 1965. On this tour, the band supported their album Out of Our Heads.

=== Tour set list ===
1. "She Said Yeah"
2. "Hitch Hike"
3. "Heart of Stone"
4. "Mercy, Mercy"
5. "That's How Strong My Love Is"
6. "Play With Fire"
7. "The Last Time"
8. "Good Times"
9. "Oh Baby"
10. "Get Off of My Cloud"
11. "I'm Moving On"
12. "(I Can't Get No) Satisfaction"

=== 2nd American Tour dates ===
Date	City	Country	Venue
29 October 1965	Montreal	Canada	Montreal Forum
30 October 1965	Ithaca	United States	Barton Hall, Cornell University
30 October 1965	Syracuse	United States	War Memorial Hall
31 October 1965	Toronto	Canada	Maple Leaf Gardens
1 November 1965	Rochester	United States	Rochester Community War Memorial
3 November 1965	Providence	United States	Rhode Island Auditorium
4 November 1965; 2 shows	New Haven	United States	New Haven Arena
5 November 1965	Boston	United States	Boston Garden
6 November 1965	New York City	United States	Academy of Music; 2 shows
6 November 1965	Philadelphia	United States	Philadelphia Convention Hall and Civic Center
7 November 1965; 2 shows	Newark	United States	Newark Symphony Hall
10 November 1965	Raleigh	United States	Reynolds Coliseum
12 November 1965	Greensboro	United States	Greensboro Coliseum
13 November 1965	Washington, D.C.	United States	Washington Coliseum
13 November 1965	Baltimore	United States	Baltimore Civic Center
14 November 1965	Knoxville	United States	Knoxville Civic Coliseum
15 November 1965	Charlotte	United States	Charlotte Coliseum
16 November 1965	Nashville	United States	Nashville Municipal Auditorium
17 November 1965	Memphis	United States	Mid-South Coliseum
20 November 1965	Shreveport	United States	Hirsch Coliseum, State Fair Grounds
21 November 1965	Fort Worth	United States	Will Rogers Memorial Center
23 November 1965	Tulsa	United States	Assembly Center
24 November 1965	Pittsburgh	United States	Civic Arena
25 November 1965	Milwaukee	United States	Milwaukee Arena
26 November 1965	Detroit	United States	Cobo Hall
27 November 1965	Dayton	United States	Hara Arena
27 November 1965	Cincinnati	United States	Cincinnati Gardens
28 November 1965; 2 shows	Chicago	United States	Arie Crown Theater, McCormick Place
29 November 1965	Denver	United States	Denver Coliseum
30 November 1965	Phoenix	United States	Arizona Veterans Memorial Coliseum
1 December 1965	Vancouver	Canada	PNE Agrodome
2 December 1965	Seattle	United States	Seattle Coliseum
3 December 1965; 2 shows	Sacramento	United States	Sacramento Memorial Auditorium
4 December 1965; 2 shows	San Jose	United States	San Jose Civic Auditorium
5 December 1965	San Diego	United States	Community Concourse, Convention Hall
5 December 1965	Los Angeles	United States	Los Angeles Memorial Sports Arena
