= Swing Auditorium =

Indoor arena in San Bernardino, California (1949–1981)

Coordinates: 34.1121°N 117.2939°W

The Swing Auditorium was an indoor arena located at 689 E Street in San Bernardino, California. It had a capacity of 10,000 patrons.

Named for California state senator Ralph E. Swing, the arena was constructed at the grounds of the National Orange Show in 1949.

Many musicians and other artists performed at the venue, including the Dillards, Jack Benny, George Burns, Louis Armstrong, Grateful Dead, Led Zeppelin, Ike & Tina Turner, Elvis Presley, Johnny Winter, and (for 13 consecutive years) Bob Hope.

Sammy Davis Jr. hosted a benefit concert at the venue in 1958, featuring performances by Judy Garland, Jerry Lewis, Tony Curtis, Danny Thomas and Shirley MacLaine. Davis hosted the event to demonstrate his appreciation to the San Bernardino Community Hospital for treating him following an automobile accident in 1954. Davis lost his left eye as a result.

The venue altered in the 1960s, becoming a prominent rock arena for the West Coast.

In 1964, it was the launching point of the first American tour of the Rolling Stones. The Grateful Dead's February 26, 1977 performance there was released in 2019 as the album Dave's Picks Volume 29.

Fleetwood Mac also performed at the venue, including a major point in their history when guitarist Peter Green returned to the band for a short period in 1971 following the departure of guitarist Jeremy Spencer, to support the band on their latest tour. The band's February 19, 1971 performance with the lineup of Danny Kirwan, Christine McVie, Peter Green, Mick Fleetwood, and John McVie was recorded.

On September 11, 1981, the auditorium was irreparably damaged when it was struck by a twin-engine Cessna T310P, registered N5705M, in an accident that killed the pilot and passenger, following which the building had to be demolished.
