= Capitol Theatre, Cardiff =

Former venue in Cardiff, Wales

Capitol Theatre
- The Cap
- Interactive map of Capitol Theatre
- Former names: Capitol Cinema
- Address: Queen Street
- Location: Cardiff
- Coordinates: 51.4827°N 3.1725°W
- Capacity: 3,158
- Type: Cinema and concert venue

Construction
- Built: 1919–1921
- Opened: 24 December 1921
- Closed: 21 January 1978
- Demolished: 1983

Capitol Theatre was a cinema and concert venue located in Cardiff, Wales, which featured a 3,158-seat auditorium was purpose built entertainment venue, which closed on 21 January 1978. It held an auditorium, a ballroom, three restaurants, a bar, a banqueting hall and a games hall.

== History ==
Construction of the theatre took 3 years. The Capitol Theatre opened on 24 December 1921 with the British comedy film Nothing Else Matters. The theatre had a seating capacity of 3,158 in the stalls, circle and balcony, which at the time, was the largest purpose-built cinema in Europe. It was originally owned by Tilney Kinema Company, but in 1931 it was leased to Paramount Cinemas. In 1941 the Rank Organisation took over the lease, and in 1964 they purchased the theatre from the Tilney Kinema Company.

The notable artists that played at the theatre included such musicians as Tom Jones, the Beatles, Queen, Led Zeppelin, Santana, Elton John, Rod Stewart, T.Rex and Bob Dylan. The Beatles' last UK concert tour concluded with two performances at the theatre on 12 December 1965. The Rolling Stones performed at Capitol Theatre with Ike & Tina Turner and the Yardbirds on 8 October 1966. Chuck Berry played there on 9 June 1970, supported by Shakin' Stevens and the Sunsets and the Wild Angels. Santana's only shows in Wales were here on 7 September 1975. The Rank Organisation closed the theatre in 1978 and it was demolished in 1983. The Capitol Centre now occupies the site.
