= Shaw Davis & the Black Ties =

- Origin: Pompano Beach, Florida, United States
- Genres: Blues rock, hard rock
- Years active: 2016–present
- Labels: Chin Music Records
- Members: Shaw Davis; Bobby Van Stone; Greg Riordan
- Website: https://www.shawdavisblackties.com/

Shaw Davis & the Black Ties is an American blues rock and hard rock trio. Formed in 2016 in Pompano Beach, Florida, United States, they have released three albums with their most recent being 2021's Red Sun Rebellion issued on Chin Music Records. They took part in the 2018 International Blues Challenge in Memphis, Tennessee. Having played over 300 shows, the band have shared the stage with Samantha Fish, Chris Duarte, Mike Zito, Albert Castiglia, G. E. Smith and Anthony Gomes, Foghat, the Guess Who, Blackberry Smoke, the Georgia Satellites, Bishop Gunn, Walter Trout, Eric Tessmer, Samantha Fish and Blue Öyster Cult.

== Career ==
The trio formed in 2016, in Pompano Beach, Florida, comprising Shaw Davis (guitar, vocals), Patrick Stevenson (bass guitar, vocals) and Bobby Van Stone (drums). They became a regional favorite and toured extensively before Shaw Davis & the Black Ties released their eponymous debut album in June 2017. An EP, Alive from Legacy (2018), provided three live tracks and they then represented South Florida in the 2018 International Blues Challenge in Memphis. The outfit performed more than 300 shows in two years, appearing nationally across the United States.

Their sophomore release, Tales from the West, was released in late 2018, was nominated in three categories for an Independent Blues Music Award, for 'Best Modern Roots Band', 'Best New Artist', and 'Best Modern Roots CD'. The album debuted at number 20 on the Roots Music Report Blues Rock Chart. The album contained nine original numbers and a couple of versions of other's material including Junior Kimbrough's "I Gotta Try You Girl". However one reviewer noted "I can't say that any of the songs really represent the blues. This is hard rock with a Frank Zappa cover that gets way, way into the metal genre". Shaw Davis & the Black Ties were cited as one of the "Top 50 Rock & Blues Artists You Must Hear In 2019" by Rock & Blues Muse. In support of their album, the band undertook their 'Tales From The West Tour' in mid-2019, sharing the stage with Samantha Fish, Chris Duarte, Mike Zito, Albert Castiglia, G. E. Smith and Anthony Gomes.

A new single was released by the trio on March 12, 2021, on Chin Music Records and distributed by Sony Orchard. "Higher" was taken from their then-upcoming album, Red Sun Rebellion. Shaw Davis & The Black Ties enlisted Paul Nelson to produce their latest tome. The album comprised nine tracks, including the trio's take on the blues standard, "Rock Me Baby".

The trio's touring schedule has seen them perform alongside Blackberry Smoke, Walter Trout, Eric Tessmer, Samantha Fish and Anthony Gomes.

== Band members ==
- Shaw Davis : Guitar, vocals
- Greg Riordan: Bass, vocals
- Bobby Van Stone : Drums

== Discography ==
=== Albums ===
Year	Title	Label
2017	Shaw Davis & the Black Ties	Self-released
2019	Tales from the West	Self-released
2021	Red Sun Rebellion	Sony Orchard
