= Great Guitars =

Great Guitars may refer to

- Great Guitars (band) jazz guitar supergroup
- Great Guitars (Great Guitars album) 1976 jazz album
- Great Guitars (Joe Louis Walker album) 1997 blues album
