= Remembrance Vol. 1 =

Compilation album by Johnny Winter
- Released: January 13, 2015
- Genre: Blues rock, blues
- Length: 133:45
- Label: Friday Music
- Producer: Johnny Winter

Johnny Winter chronology
Step Back (2014)	Remembrance Vol. 1 (2015)	Live from Japan (2015)

Remembrance Vol. 1 is a three-CD album by blues rock guitarist and singer Johnny Winter. It is a compilation of live recordings, many of them previously released, selected from throughout Winter's career. It was released on the Friday Music label on January 13, 2015.

The first disc, Best of the Live Bootleg Series, contains songs selected from the Live Bootleg Series albums. These are authorized recordings, released from 2007 to 2014, many of which had been previously released as bootlegs. The second disc, Live Bootleg Special Edition, was previously released in 2014 only as a vinyl LP. The third disc, Live Bootleg Rarities Vol. 1, contains previously unreleased tracks.

Remembrance Vol. 1 debuted at #8 on the Billboard chart for Top Blues Albums.

== Critical reception ==
Professional ratings
Review scores
Source	Rating
Toronto Sun	3.5/5 stars

In the Toronto Sun, Darryl Sterdan said, "Not surprisingly, the three-disc Remembrance Volume 1 feels slightly cobbled together... But Winter's unfailingly powerful performances, along with a 25-song set list that includes mainstays like "Crossroads", "Jumpin' Jack Flash", "Johnny B. Goode" and "Killing Floor" — not to mention odds 'n' sods from "The Crawl" and "Wipe Out" to "Wildwood Flower" — make this a memorable memorial."

== Track listing ==
Disc one – Best of the Live Bootleg Series

1. Introduction – :14
2. "Sen-Sa-Shun" (Sonny Thompson, Freddie King) – 7:36
3. "Messin' with the Kid" (Mel London) – 4:38
4. "Mean Mistreater" (Muddy Waters) – 8:50
5. "Boot Hill" (traditional) – 5:14
6. "Stranger Blues" (Clarence Lewis, Elmore James, Morris Levy) – 6:31
7. "You Keep Sayin' that You're Leaving" (Johnny Winter) – 7:15
8. "One Step at a Time" (Winter) – 5:41
9. "Crossroads" (Robert Johnson) – 5:42
10. "Rollin' and Tumblin'" (Waters) – 3:37

Disc two – Live Bootleg Special Edition

1. "Hideaway" (Sonny Thompson, King) – 9:40
2. "Ain't That Just Like a Woman" (Claude Demetrius, Fleecie Moore) – 4:36
3. "Johnny B. Goode" (Chuck Berry) – 5:28
4. "Serious as a Heart Attack" (Winter) – 6:23
5. "Stranger" (Winter) – 6:33
6. "Jumpin' Jack Flash" (Mick Jagger, Keith Richards) – 5:42

Disc three – Live Bootleg Rarities Vol. 1

1. "Mean Town Blues" (Winter) – 7:20
2. "Sound the Bell" (Clarence Garlow, Eddie Shuler, Canut Guillen) – 7:05
3. "Killing Floor" (Chester Burnett) – 4:52
4. "Mississippi Blues" (Willie Brown) – 3:31
5. "Run Rudolph Run" (Johnny Marks, Marvin Brodie) – 3:38
6. "The Crawl" (Shuler, Raymond Victoria) – 2:44
7. "Wildwood Flower" (traditional) – 2:03
8. "Wipe Out" (The Surfaris) – 4:30
9. "Come Back Baby" (Ray Charles) – 4:18

== Personnel ==
Production

- Produced by Johnny Winter
- Executive producers: Paul Nelson, Joe Reagoso
- Mastering: Joe Reagoso
- Album cover photography: Ben Fixler
- Art direction: Paul Nelson
- Layout: Joe Reagoso, John Herdt
