= Preacher and the President =

Studio album by Joe Louis Walker
- Released: 1998
- Studio: Muscle Shoals
- Genre: Blues
- Label: Verve
- Producers: Steve Cropper, Joe Louis Walker

Joe Louis Walker chronology
Great Guitars (1997)	Preacher and the President (1998)	Silvertone Blues (1999)

Preacher and the President is an album by the American musician Joe Louis Walker, released in 1998 through Verve Records. Walker supported the album with a North American tour, backed by the Bosstalkers. The album was nominated for a W. C. Handy Award.

== Production ==
Recorded at Muscle Shoals Sound Studio, the album was produced by Steve Cropper. Walker wrote nine of the album's 10 songs. He was backed by the Muscle Shoals Rhythm Section. The title track references Jimmy Swaggart and Bill Clinton. "Uhh!" is a cover of the Dyke and the Blazers song.

== Critical reception ==
Professional ratings
Review scores
Source	Rating
The Age	4/5 stars
AllMusic	4/5 stars
Robert Christgau	(neither)
The Encyclopedia of Popular Music	4/5 stars
Knight Ridder	A
The Tampa Tribune	3/4 stars

The Age opined that "Joe Louis demonstrates on the pleading 'Tell the Truth' and the profoundly emotional 'Yveline' why he is one of the few major blues finds of the past decade." The Chicago Tribune wrote that, "if the vocals and fretwork on the LP smolder rather than sear, the soulful songcraft is still first-rate." The Washington Post noted that the album "offers an appealing view of his extroverted showmanship and his considerable growth as a songwriter who knows how to provoke an audience's laughter and sympathy."

The Toronto Star stated that "Walker's songwriting is fine, his fancy backup sophisticated." The Chicago Reader concluded that Walker "approaches the suave urbanity of Al Green or Lionel Richie." The Advocate deemed Walker "an American roots music master." The Chicago Sun-Times listed Preacher and the President among the 10 best blues albums of 1998.

== Track listing ==
No.	Title	Length
1.	"Preacher and the President"
2.	"Yveline"
3.	"Repay My Love"
4.	"I'm Not Messin' Around"
5.	"Y&T"
6.	"Lyin' in the Name of Love"
7.	"Pride of a Fool"
8.	"Uhh!"
9.	"Tell the Truth"
10.	"My Real Fantasy"
