= Leila Bela =

American avant-garde musician, writer, photographer

Leila Bela ليلا بلا
- Born: Tehran, Iran
- Origin: Austin, Texas, U.S.
- Genres: Experimental, avant-garde, noise
- Occupations: Musician, writer, actress, record producer, film director
- Instruments: drums, harp, santur, violin, psaltery among other instruments
- Years active: 2002–present
- Label: Ellahy Amen Records
- Website: www.leilabela.com

Leila Bela (Persian: ليلا بلا) is an Iranian-born American avant-garde musician, writer, photographer, actress, multi-instrumentalist, playwright, and recording artist from Austin, Texas.

== Early life and education ==
Bela was born Leila Bela Kousheshi, in Tehran, Iran, to a family of Persian female singers and musicians such as her great-aunt Monir Vakili as well as former Persian royalty, descendants of the Qajar Empire but was not raised by them. Her mother abandoned her at age four and she lived in several foster homes and with family and strangers all over the world growing up. In her early teens she was very active in the punk and underground music scene. She began attending Nightclubs and gay bars such as Numbers and Rich's in Houston, Tx.

In her late teens she began writing freelance articles about underground music for various local papers. Her first major job was an interview with Trent Reznor of Nine Inch Nails. She had been told by the paper only to cover the show, but when Reznor saw her, he introduced himself and offered her an interview, allowing her to use his recording device to record it. She accepted, and he later invited her to the opening of the very first Lollapalooza as his guest and a reporter.

After dealing with issues of misogyny in the newspaper industry she started her own one-woman music magazine in 1998 called NYXLair while attending college at the University of Houston. There she double majored in theatre and physics and minored in literature, as well as taking independent studies in photography and playwriting. She was one of five students, chosen out of thousands who had submitted original plays, to study with award-winning playwright Edward Albee, known for his dark themes.

Her Shakespeare audition in her second year at university also landed her in a class taught by master Shakespearean director Sir Peter Hall, who chose four people for the semester class in Houston. She performed such roles as Natalia in Three Sisters in 2001, Lady Nijo in Top Girls in 2002, Regan in King Lear, Phoebe in As You Like It, and Antigone in Antigone.

== Career ==
Despite her teachers urging her to pursue an acting career, Bela decided to start writing a concept album of experimental music after school and soon left the theatre world for music with a theatrical twist. After releasing her first album, which she recorded at home on a small recording device, she started playing live shows. After opening for bandleader Martin Atkins' group in a show, she joined his supergroup Pigface briefly in 2004.

In 2002, she launched Ellahy Amen Records, a label based in Paris, France and Austin, Texas for avant-garde musicians.

According to her website, Bela got the idea to start her own label after getting offers from other labels that she wasn't satisfied with; she didn't want to be on a male-run label. According to an interview on Persian radio, this decision came after Mike Patton emailed her urging her to pick the label that was the best permanent home for her music rather than a label that would be a quick fix. Artists signed to her label include Bela herself; Maya Bond, an eight-year-old singer-songwriter; and Lexion Blacklord, a musician from Switzerland.

Bela is also the creator of a custom-made instrument called a Beltar, which has sympathetic strings and can play either noise or melody. The Beltar can be used both electrically or acoustically. Bela designed it to look like a weapon based on a theory Trey Spruance related to her of how "instruments are the weapons of angels".

In 2004, she was invited to play SXSW's music festival to promote her album.

Bela collaborated with Eric Tessmer in 2010 on a Persian folk song called "To Beya". Bela wrote the rearrangement of the song and directed a video that was shown on a Persian Film Festival site.

Bela was featured in Dazed Magazine as one of 12 artists who made alternative anthems for Dazed. She created an experimental track for them to stream called "Bitten Reformer".

== Discography ==
Year	Album
2003	Angra Manyu
