= Live from Japan =

Live album by Johnny Winter
- Released: April 2015
- Recorded: April 15, 2011
- Venue: Zepp, Tokyo
- Genre: Blues rock
- Label: MVD Audio
- Producer: Paul Nelson

Johnny Winter chronology
Remembrance Vol. 1 (2015)	Live from Japan (2015)	Live Bootleg Series Vol. 12 (2016)

Live from Japan
- Directed by: Kiyoshi Inasawa
- Produced by: Kohshiro Yamashita; Kota Akutsu
- Starring: The Johnny Winter Band
- Distributed by: MVD Visual
- Release date: July 2012

Live from Japan is an album and a concert video by blues rock guitarist and singer Johnny Winter. It was recorded at Zepp music hall in Tokyo on April 15, 2011. This was the last night of a three-concert run by Winter, his first live performances in Japan.

The album was released in April 2015 as a CD, and also as a two-disc vinyl LP. The concert video was released in July 2012 in DVD format.

== Critical reception ==
Writing about the album on AllMusic, Mark Deming said, "A mobile recording system was on hand to capture the historic event, and Live from Japan documents a typically fiery show from the Texas guitar slinger, showing off his powerful instrumental style as he wails through a set of blues standards."

Writing about the video on Folk & Acoustic Music Exchange, Mark S. Tucker said, "As the concert proceeds and that well steeped blues blood of his stirs, Winter gets more animated, his own music infecting him as much as the audience.... By the time he lights into "Got My Mojo Working", everything's up to speed and kinetic, even with the august gent still seated. Johnny becomes what he is: a blues king holding court and showering blessings on the people. From there, you're buckled in for the ride."

== Track listing ==
1. "Hideaway" (Freddie King, Sonny Thompson) – 4:29
2. "Sugar Coated Love" (Jay Miller) – 5:51
3. "She Likes to Boogie Real Low" (Frankie L. Sims, Joe Corona) – 3:59
4. "Good Morning Little Schoolgirl" (Sonny Boy Williamson) – 4:12
5. "Got My Mojo Working" (Preston Foster, King, Thompson) – 7:00
6. "Johnny B. Goode" (Chuck Berry) – 4:16
7. "Blackjack" (Ray Charles) – 8:16
8. "All Tore Down" (Johnny Winter) – 2:57
9. "Lone Wolf" (Winter) – 4:51
10. "Don't Take Advantage of Me" (Winter) – 7:46
11. "Bony Maronie" (Larry Williams) – 5:16
12. "It's All Over Now" (Bobby Womack, Shirley Womack) – 4:47
13. "Dust My Broom" (Robert Johnson) – 7:18
14. "Highway 61 Revisited" (Bob Dylan) – 6:38

== Personnel ==
The Johnny Winter Band

- Johnny Winter – guitar, vocals
- Paul Nelson – guitar
- Scott Spray – bass
- Vito Liuzzi – drums, vocals

Production

- Produced by Paul Nelson
- Packaging design, photos: Marion Amundsen
- Liner notes: Lance Purdue
