= Tessmer =

Tessmer is a German surname, a Germanized form of the West Slavic personal name Tešimir/Těšimir. Notable people with the surname include:

- Eric Tessmer (born 1981), American blues guitarist
- Estel Tessmer (1910–1972), American football and basketball player
- Jay Tessmer (born 1971), American baseball player

== See also ==
- Tesser
- Tesmer
