= Dark Night (album) =

Studio album by James Armstrong
- Released: 1998
- Genre: Blues
- Label: HighTone

James Armstrong chronology
Sleeping with a Stranger (1995)	Dark Night (1998)	Got It Goin' On (2000)

Dark Night is an album by the American musician James Armstrong, released in 1998. Armstrong supported the album with a North American tour.

== Production ==
Armstrong recorded the album after recuperating from a home invasion and serious stabbing, which is referenced in the title track. Armstrong lost feeling in his fingers and had to relearn how to play guitar; he also learned slide guitar during his recovery. "Lil' James" is about Armstrong's son, who was also injured in the attack. Michael Ross played lead guitar on the majority of the tracks; Joe Louis Walker and Doug MacLeod played lead guitar on a few tracks. "Bank of Love" is about falling in love with a bank teller.

== Critical reception ==
Professional ratings
Review scores
Source	Rating
AllMusic	4/5 stars
The Penguin Guide to Blues Recordings	3/4 stars
The Philadelphia Inquirer	3/4 stars

Jazziz wrote that Armstrong's "vocals and songs are vulnerable, brooding, and brimming with resignation... His hoarse, laconic delivery and falsetto on 'Too Many Misses' and 'Dark Night' are soul-piercing." The Toronto Star called the album "a dozen soulful tunes with a light, appealing but emotionally edgy voice a la Otis Redding." The Calgary Herald said that Armstrong's "blues riffs are clean and bold and his singing reveals his deep blues roots."

The Record concluded: "Serviceable on his debut, Armstrong's vocals take on a new soulful fiber on Dark Night." The Ottawa Citizen deemed Dark Night "a mixture of anger and depression leavened with the ray of hope that marks all of the best blues music." The Daily Advertiser labeled it "a smooth, understated exercise in tasteful West Coast blues." The Philadelphia Inquirer determined that Armstrong "wins you over with the undeniable honesty of his performances."

AllMusic wrote that Michael Ross's "silky leads blend with Armstrong's still very potent singing voice quite sympathetically."

== Track listing ==
No.	Title	Length
1.	"Dark Night"
2.	"Too Many Misses for Me"
3.	"Slender Man Blues"
4.	"Trouble on the Home Front"
5.	"Lil' James"
6.	"Can't Get Off Your Love (Heaven Help Me)"
7.	"Bank of Love"
8.	"What I Would Do (For Your Love)"
9.	"Witchin' Moon"
10.	"Here for the Music"
11.	"Standing in Your Way"
12.	"Just in Case"
