= Blue Soul =

Blue Soul may refer to:

- Blue Soul (Blue Mitchell album)
- Blue Soul (Joe Louis Walker album)
