= Jason Ricci =

American harmonica player and singer (born 1974)

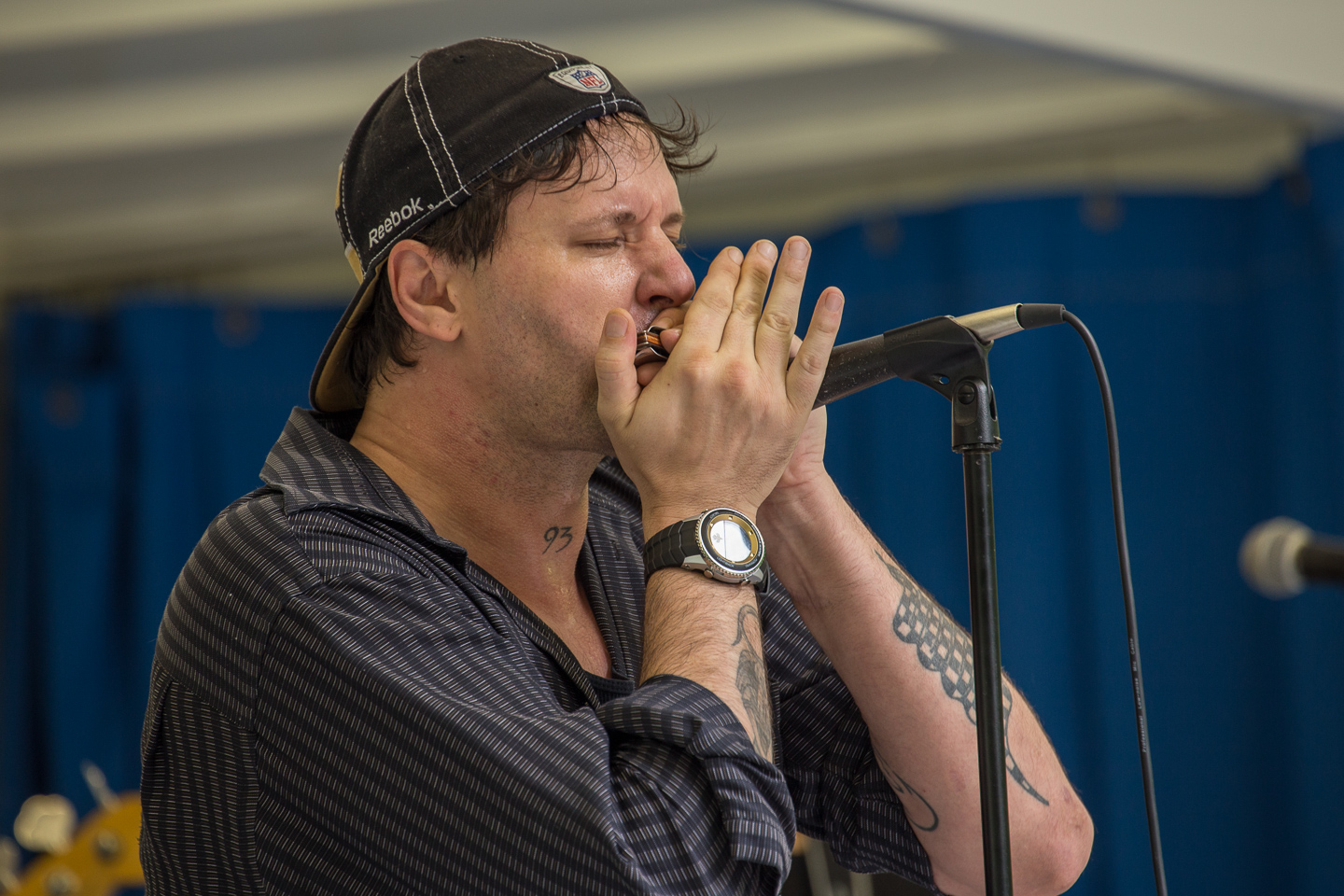
- Jason Ricci performing on stage

Background information
- Born: February 3, 1974 (age 52); Portland, Maine, United States
- Genres: Blues, rock
- Occupation: Musician
- Instruments: vocals, harmonica
- Years active: 1995–present
- Label: Eller Soul
- Website: jasonriccimusic.com

Jason Ricci (born February 3, 1974) is an American harmonica player and singer. In addition to his solo albums, Ricci has appeared as a guest harmonica player on albums with Johnny Winter, Terence Blanchard, Nick Curran, Ana Popović, Walter Trout, Cedric Burnside, The Mannish Boys and Joe Louis Walker among others. Ricci was named "Best Harmonica Player" at the 2010 Blues Music Awards, and also performed on Grammy winning 2014 Johnny Winter album Step Back. In February 2015, Ricci played at the Rock and Roll Hall of Fame with the Paul Shaffer Band, Tom Morello and Zac Brown to induct The Paul Butterfield Blues Band. Ricci also continues touring with his band Jason Ricci and the Bad Kind as well as with other bands such as: "Harmonicon" (Sugar Blue, Billy Branch, Ricci), "JJ Appleton and Jason Ricci" and "Mark Hummel's Harmonica Blowout". In 2017, Jason Ricci and The Bad Kind signed a record deal with the Eller Soul label and released their new album Approved By Snakes released on June 16, 2017.

== Biography ==
=== Early life ===
Raised in Portland, Maine, United States, Jason Ricci is the son of Joseph Ricci (co-founder of Elan School), and his first wife Cheryl Benton. His parents divorced in 1979. Ricci started performing in punk bands at the age of 14. Initially a vocalist, Ricci decided to pursue an instrument as well and the band chose harmonica for him. Being a blues fan, Ricci's mother encouraged his development as a harmonica player. Ricci names Howard Levy and his overblowing technique as having influenced his early harmonica playing as well as his decision not to switch to the saxophone. He further developed his playing style listening to and emulating Little Walter, Paul Butterfield, Pat Ramsey, and Adam Gussow. Jason has also directly referenced Pat Ramsey as a major influence in his developing a fast pentatonic approach to his playing, stating he prefers to be deliberate in his note choice in favor of speed for "speed's sake".

=== Musical career ===
In 1995, Ricci moved from Portland to Memphis, TN, where shortly thereafter he placed first in the Sonny Boy Blues Society contest at 21 years of age. Later that same year Ricci recorded his first album, Jason Ricci.

In Memphis, Ricci began playing with David Malone Kimbrough, son of Junior Kimbrough, and soon was a part of the bands of both Kimbroughs and was sitting in with R. L. Burnside. This also marked a dark period for Ricci, as drug addiction led to a one-year stint in jail.

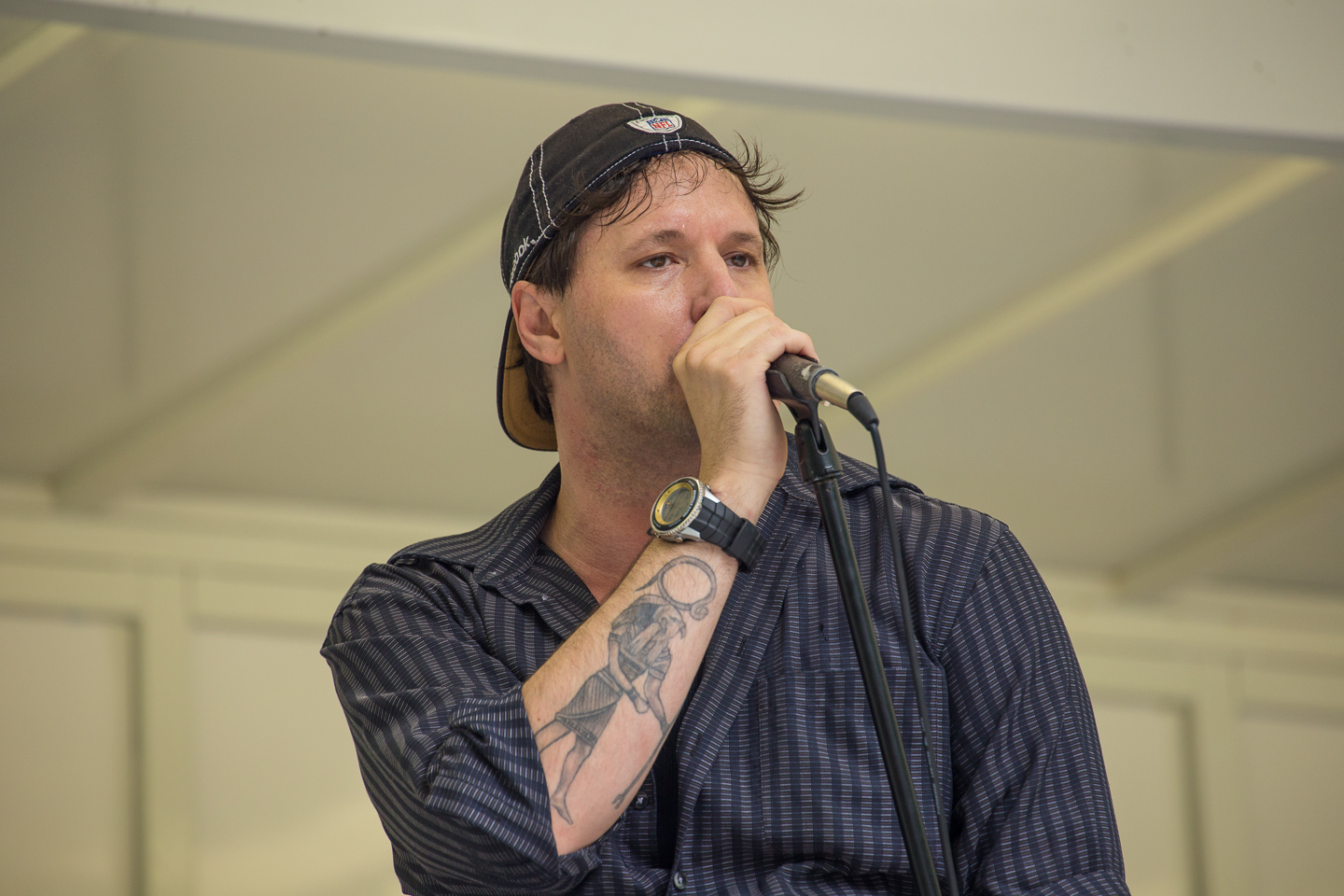
Ricci singing

In 1999, Ricci won the Mars National Harmonica Contest, and began playing with Keith Brown, later recording with him as well. In 2000, he received a two-page write up in Blues Access magazine by Adam Gussow (harmonica player for Satan and Adam) saying:

I am convinced he along with New Jersey's Dennis Gruenling is one of the best harmonica players of his generation.

Gussow has also included Jason Ricci in the Top 10 All Time Harmonica Players list on his Modern Blues Harmonica website.

After 15 months with Big Al and the Heavyweights, and a brief period of living in Raleigh, North Carolina, Ricci started his own band, Jason Ricci & New Blood, in 2002. This band features Shawn Starski, who, in June 2008, was named by Guitar Player magazine as one of the "Top Ten Hottest New Guitarists." In 2005, Ricci was honored with the Muddy Waters Most Promising New Blues Artist award.

In 2007, Ricci and New Blood were signed to Eclecto Groove, a new subdivision of Delta Groove Productions. His first album with the label, titled Rocket Number Nine, was released October 23, 2007. Later in 2009 the band recorded Done With The Devil for the same Label. Done With The Devil signaled a new direction in Ricci's musical inspiration, as his study of the occult strongly influenced the writing on the album. The band as a whole has been nominated for Blues Band of the Year three times by Blues Wax magazine. Ricci won the Blues Critic Award for Harmonica Player of the Year (2008) and was nominated for a Blues Music Award for Harmonica Player of the Year in 2009 and 2010. By January 2011, Ricci had relocated to New Orleans, and assembled a new band, Approved By Snakes, with guitarist John Lisi. Ricci received "Best Harmonica Player" at the May 6, 2010 Blues Music Awards.

Ricci played harmonica on the song "My Babe" on Johnny Winter's 2014 album Step Back. The album won the Grammy Award for Best Blues Album in February 2015.

In February 2015, Ricci began a national tour with a new band named Jason Ricci and the Bad Kind.

In April 2015, Ricci played harmonica on the song "Born in Chicago" with Zac Brown and Tom Morello at the 2015 Rock and Roll Hall of Fame induction ceremony for The Paul Butterfield Blues Band. In August 2017, Ricci was awarded the "Bernie Bray Harmonica Player of the Year Award" by The Society for the Preservation and Advancement of the Harmonica at the SPAH annual conference in Tulsa, OK. In 2018, Ricci received Blues Music Award nominations both for best harmonica instrumentalist and best rock blues artist, of which he was awarded best harmonica instrumentalist.

=== Side projects ===
Ricci participates as an Expert Guide (instructor) in the Harmonica Collective, an annual conference for harmonica players wishing to improve their skills and collaborate with other musicians, which he co-founded with Winslow Yerxa in 2013. He also posts free video harmonica lessons to his web site, and teaches live lessons via Skype.

== Personal life ==
Ricci has been openly "queer" gay/bisexual most his career and has been outspoken about this subject in many interviews. This has been a professional obstacle as well as an opportunity for Ricci to challenge both gay stereotypes and traditional blues expectations:

The [gay] community doesn't like drum sets and guitars and actual live music. They're used to lip-synching, and dudes in dresses, and Madonna, and Cher, and techno beats. Those are the things that kept me from coming out earlier. I felt like I had nothing in common with the gay community, and I still don't feel like I have a lot in common with the community. I'm hoping that changes, but the majority of their icons are press-friendly little Mickey Mouse-doll figureheads that you're more likely to see on a show redecorating somebody's house than onstage at a blues festival... When I came out of the closet as a gay white male from an upper-middle-class suburban home, I came out as not just gay, but as a white guy, and as a guy who likes punk, and as a guy who didn't come from total poverty, and all those things that we associate with being 'blues' things. And when I did that, I wanted to sing about that. I wanted to write songs about what my life was like, and I wanted to use terminology that was modern.

Ricci's openness with being gay has occasionally been a difficult issue in the traditionally conservative blues world, as he's been "disinvited" from a number of venues and events.

Jason Ricci married Kaitlin Dibble on May 17, 2017.

== Discography ==
- 1995: Jason Ricci
- 1997: Down At The Juke
- 2001: Feel Good Funk
- 2004: Live At Checkers Tavern
- 2005: Her Satanic Majesty Requests Harmonica Music (compilation)
- 2006: Blood on the Road
- 2007: Rocket Number 9
- 2009: Done with the Devil
- 2010: Down That Road... (compilation)
- 2015: Dirty Memory (with JJ Appleton)
- 2017: Approved By Snakes (Jason Ricci & The Bad Kind)
- 2019: My Chops Are Rolling!! (Jason Ricci & The Bad Kind)

Ricci has also appeared as a guest harmonica player with Johnny Winter, Nick Curran, Ana Popović, Walter Trout, Cedric Burnside, The Mannish Boys, Altered Five Blues Band and Joe Louis Walker among others.
