= The Gift (Joe Louis Walker album) =

Studio album by Joe Louis Walker
- Released: 1988
- Genre: Blues, soul
- Label: HighTone
- Producer: Joe Louis Walker

Joe Louis Walker chronology
Cold Is the Night (1986)	The Gift (1988)	Blue Soul (1989)

The Gift is the second album by the American musician Joe Louis Walker, released in 1988. Walker was backed by the Boss Talkers. He supported the album with a North American tour.

== Production ==
The album was produced by Walker with assistance from Bruce Bromberg. Walker's singing style was influenced by gospel music; he wanted the music to be reminiscent of the Memphis soul of the 1960s. He tried to avoid blues clichés in his lyrics. The Memphis Horns played on several tracks. Steve Berlin contributed a tenor sax solo to "Mama Didn't Raise No Fool".

== Critical reception ==
Professional ratings
Review scores
Source	Rating
AllMusic	4.5/5 stars
Robert Christgau	A−
MusicHound Blues: The Essential Album Guide	4/5 stars
Oakland Tribune	3/4 stars
The Penguin Guide to Blues Recordings	3/4 stars

The San Diego Union-Tribune wrote that "Walker's music swings with a smooth rhythm that lends itself well to his polished vocals and linear guitar solos." The Washington Post called the album "a taut, funky record steeped in '60s soul and highlighted by some stirring vocals that occasionally recall Otis Redding." Robert Christgau said that, "like they say, he just plays the blues... Yet between sharp tempos and worldly-wise material, he overcomes the boredom factor built into that time-worn endeavor."

The Chicago Tribune labeled Walker "an impressive lyric writer [who] has created wry and wise songs gloriously free of the usual blues cliches." The Globe and Mail determined that Walker's "a tad more traditional (and less guilt-ridden) in his approach to the blues (and life) than Cray, and he's got a nice tough edge to his playing that the yuppified Cray sometimes lacks." The San Francisco Examiner praised the "sleek production and depth of feeling."

AllMusic wrote that the album "just may be his finest album of all, filled with soulful vocal performances, bone-cutting guitar work, and tight backing."

== Track listing ==
No.	Title	Length
1.	"One Time Around"
2.	"Thin Line"
3.	"747"
4.	"The Gift"
5.	"What About You"
6.	"Shade Tree Mechanic"
7.	"1/4 to 3"
8.	"Mama Didn't Raise No Fool"
9.	"Everybody's Had the Blues"
10.	"Main Goal"
