= Speechless (1994 film) =

- Theatrical release poster
- Directed by: Ron Underwood
- Written by: Robert King
- Produced by: Geena Davis; Renny Harlin
- Starring: Michael Keaton; Geena Davis; Bonnie Bedelia; Ernie Hudson; Charles Martin Smith; Gailard Sartain; Christopher Reeve
- Cinematography: Donald Peterman
- Edited by: Richard Francis-Bruce
- Music by: Marc Shaiman
- Distributed by: Metro-Goldwyn-Mayer (United States); United International Pictures (International)
- Release date: December 16, 1994
- Running time: 99 minutes
- Language: English
- Budget: $38 million
- Box office: $25.1 million

Speechless is a 1994 American romantic comedy film directed by Ron Underwood. It stars Michael Keaton, Geena Davis (who also co-produced with her then-husband, director Renny Harlin), Bonnie Bedelia, Ernie Hudson and Christopher Reeve.

== Plot ==
After meeting each other for the first time in the gift shop of the Las Cruces, New Mexico hotel where they are both staying, insomniac writers Julia Mann and Kevin Vallick fight over the last box of sleep medicine. Initially, they do not realize both are speechwriters for rival candidates in a New Mexico Senate election, so they both fall in love. Julia works for Democratic candidate Lloyd Wannamaker and Kevin for Republican candidate Ray Garvin. Inadvertently influencing each other's work, they discover each other's jobs when they are both invited to speak at a school. Both shocked, they end up attacking each other verbally on stage. Later, in their campaign speeches, they continue to argue, unbeknownst to everyone else. Their romance causes great confusion, as they have to decide if love and politics can mix.

Also complicating matters are, amongst other things, Kevin's cutthroat ex-wife Annette, who got Kevin the job on the Republican's campaign. Julia's estranged fiancé, television war correspondent Robert "Baghdad Bob" Freed (also known as "Mr. Flak Jacket") turns up and wants her back. She had broken off the engagement, as she believed he wanted a cheering section more than he wanted a wife.

Julia's organizer accidentally falls into Kevin's hands, and he hacks into her Wannamaker's speech, making him sound foolish. Then, Julia's team meets with Kevin's in his offices. He doesn't attend, but meets with Julia that night; she tells him she's engaged again and he warns her she's getting fired. She takes advice from him to make Wannmaker more loved by the people by having him help rescue a missing bear cub that has been dominating the news. This gives Julia a promotion to press secretary.

At a televised debate, Julia breaks off the engagement, and immediately after Kevin tells her he's crazy for her. They sneak off, spending the night together. The next morning at dawn, Annette shows up, tasking Kevin to write a campaign ad. Not able to wake him, Julia writes a sitcom-style ad.

The next morning, Kevin chews out Julia because he thinks she leaked financial info to the press, not thanking her for the successful ad. Later on, Mike Kratz, whom Julia replaced as Wannamaker's press secretary, tells Kevin that both Wannamaker and Garvin took bribes. A man named Alan Proctor is responsible for both bribes, but has chosen Wannamaker. Julia is told by campaign manager Marvin Lucas as they approach the stage in victory.

Kevin arrives, interrupting Wannamaker's victory speech, to declare his love, swooping down into Julia's arms. The film closes with a news report given by Bob of Julia's late entry into a senatorial race, with Kevin as campaign manager.

== Cast ==
- Michael Keaton as Kevin Vallick
- Geena Davis as Julia Mann
- Bonnie Bedelia as Annette
- Ernie Hudson as Dan Ventura
- Christopher Reeve as Bob Freed
- Charles Martin Smith as Mike Kratz
- Gailard Sartain as Lee Cutler
- Ray Baker as Ray Garvin
- Mitchell Ryan as Lloyd Wannamaker
- Willie Garson as Dick
- Paul Lazar as Harry
- Richard Poe as Tom
- Harry Shearer as Chuck
- Steven Wright as Eddie
- Jodi Carlisle as Doris Wind
- Robin Pearson Rose as Teacher
- Peter Mackenzie as Andy
- Mickey Cottrell as Debate Moderator
- Richard McGonagle as Dignitary
- Tony Genaro as Truck Driver
- Mary Pat Gleason as Desk Clerk
- Jon Favreau as Debate Control Room Operator (uncredited)

== Production ==
The film was widely interpreted as an imitation of the contemporaneous, real-life romance of rival political consultants James Carville (key advisor to the first presidential campaign of Bill Clinton) and Mary Matalin (speechwriter for President George H. W. Bush). However, actor Michael Keaton reported that the script had been developed before Carville and Matalin had ever met—though Keaton did admit to viewing The War Room, a documentary about Carville's work, to prepare himself for the film. Keaton came on board after dropping out of Batman Forever.

== Reception ==
The film received mostly negative reviews from critics. On the review aggregator website Rotten Tomatoes, 13% of 30 critics' reviews are positive. Audiences surveyed by CinemaScore gave the film a grade B on scale of A to F.

Roger Ebert of the Chicago Sun-Times gave it 2 out of 4, and wrote: "The level of humor is dialed safely down to the Sitcom setting, which limits what can happen, and how much we can care about it." Gene Siskel of the Chicago Tribune gave the film 1 out of 4 and was critical of the lack of chemistry between the leads and the script, writing: "This script needed to be completely overhauled before filming began."

Brian Lowry of Variety wrote: "Never achieves the madcap hilarity of the '40s romantic comedies it seeks to emulate, and some of the dramatic moments feel a bit forced." Marjorie Baumgarten of the Austin Chronicle gave a positive review and wrote: "It comes down to the charms of Keaton and Davis in the end. You like these characters and root for them to score."

Geena Davis was nominated for a Golden Globe Award for Best Actress – Motion Picture Musical or Comedy for her performance at the 52nd Golden Globes.

=== Box office ===
The film debuted at No. 5 in the United States and went on to gross $20.6 million. It grossed $25.1 million worldwide. In Latin America, several countries released the film with the title No Se Tú, taking advantage of the 1992 hit song by Mexican singer Luis Miguel, included in the soundtrack of the film.

=== Year-end lists ===
- Honorable mention – Michael MacCambridge, Austin American-Statesman
- 8th worst – Desson Howe, The Washington Post

== Soundtrack ==
The soundtrack included "House of Love" by Amy Grant and Vince Gill, "Born to Be Wild" by Steppenwolf, "Big Girls Don't Cry" by The Four Seasons, "Count Your Blessings" by Jack Sheldon, "Hit the Road Jack" by Ray Charles, "To Be Alone with You" by Bob Dylan, "Anything You Can Do" by Betty Hutton and Howard Keel, "Just in Time" by Tony Bennett, "Mi Tierra" by Gloria Estefan, "Sorry Seems to Be the Hardest Word" by Elton John, "No Sé Tú" by Luis Miguel, "All Shook Up" by Elvis Presley and "2 Sides", a track also present on James Armstrong's 2000 album, Got It Goin' On.

Marc Shaiman composed the score for the film and arranged "Count Your Blessings".
