= Everybody Wants a Piece =

Studio album by Joe Louis Walker
- Released: October 9, 2015
- Genre: Blues
- Length: 52:44
- Label: Provogue
- Producer: Paul Nelson

Joe Louis Walker chronology
Hornet's Nest (2014)	Everybody Wants a Piece (2015)

Everybody Wants a Piece is a 2015 album by Joe Louis Walker. The album received a Grammy Award nomination for Best Contemporary Blues Album.

== Track listing ==
1. "Everybody Wants a Piece" (Joe Louis Walker) – 5:03
2. "Do I Love Her" (Taj Mahal) – 3:02
3. "Buzz on You" (Richard Fleming, Tom Hambridge) – 5:01
4. "Black & Blue" (John Bradford, Walker) – 5:57
5. "Witchcraft" (Walker ?) – 5:12
6. "One Sunny Day" (Danny Kirwan) – 4:33
7. "Gospel Blues" (Bradford, Anthony Cage, Walker, Phillip Young) – 5:54
8. "Wade in the Water" (traditional) – 6:25
9. "Man of Many Words" (Buddy Guy) – 3:14
10. "Young Girls Blues" (Bradford, Cage, Walker, Young) – 4:15
11. "35 Years Old" (Joe Russo, Walker) – 4:08
