= James Armstrong (musician) =

American guitarist, singer and songwriter (born 1957)

- Born: April 22, 1957 (age 68); Los Angeles, California, U.S.
- Genres: Soul blues, electric blues
- Occupations: Guitarist, singer, songwriter
- Instruments: Guitar, vocals
- Years active: 1970s–present
- Labels: HighTone; Catfood Records
- Website: Official website

James Armstrong (born April 22, 1957) is an American soul blues and electric blues guitarist, singer and songwriter. He released three albums on HighTone Records and is signed with Catfood Records. His songs have been used in the soundtracks of three films; Speechless, Hear No Evil, and The Florentine.

== Biography ==
Armstrong's father was a jazz guitarist and his mother a blues singer. Having learned the guitar at a young age, Armstrong formed his first band at school and was touring the United States in his late teens. Inspired by Albert King and Robert Cray, his musical education included backing musicians such as Albert Collins, Big Joe Turner and Smokey Wilson. Armstrong relocated to the San Francisco Bay Area and, in 1995, released his debut album, Sleeping with a Stranger, on HighTone.

However, in April 1997, Armstrong was almost stabbed to death by an intruder at his home. The shoulder injury necessitated months of rehabilitation, which still left Armstrong with limited guitar playing ability in his left hand. He adjusted his playing style, hired a lead guitar player, and realised that playing slide guitar helped to slowly recover his dexterity. His second, introspective, album, Dark Night, was issued in 1998. It incorporated Joe Louis Walker and Doug MacLeod playing lead guitar on a couple of the songs. The album track, "Bank of Love", was used in the films Hear No Evil and The Florentine.

Armstrong recommenced live performances on the blues festival circuit, with a noteworthy appearance at the 1999 Pocono Blues Festival in Pennsylvania. In early 2000, Armstrong returned to the recording studio to work on his next album, Got It Goin' On. He was aided in the project by utilising Walker's rhythm section, plus a guest appearance from the keyboardist Jim Pugh. In 2001, Armstrong's song "Pennies and Picks" from Got It Goin' On, earned him a W.C. Handy Award nomination for 'Song of the Year'. Armstrong himself was nominated for 'Contemporary Male Blues Guitarist of the Year'. "2 Sides", another song from Got It Goin' On was included in the film soundtrack for Speechless.

Armstrong has worked with Albert Collins, Keb' Mo', Coco Montoya, Roy Brown, Chaka Khan, Ricky Lee Jones, Mitch Mitchell and Tommy Castro.

Armstrong's 2011 release on Catfood Records, Blues At The Border, was his first recording in 11 years. James released Guitar Angels on Catfood Records in 2014.

In 2016, Armstrong started his own record label, Guitar Angels Records. The first release on his label, in May 2016, was the self-titled CD Mary Jo Curry from the Springfield, Illinois vocalist.

== Critical comments ==
Living Blues: "... With a skintight band and a well-balanced combination of fire, technical proficiency, and taste, Armstrong continues on his way to the upper echelon of contemporary blues artists."

CBC Radio: "...full of haunting and subtle nuances that point to a life rich with experience, this musician has paid his dues. James plays for and with his audience, extending the reach of the blues to include highly charged sensuality, yearning, healing and good lowdown fun!"

JazzTimes: "...demonstrates the kind of flexibility that allows him easily and convincingly shift gears from slow blues... to urban funk... to N’awlins grooves to rousing roadhouse shuffles..."

Tony Russell: "If you define 'blues' by the rigid categories of structure rather than the flexible language of feeling allusion, Robert Cray... Larry Garner, Joe Louis Walker and James Armstrong are a new and uncategorizable breed, their music blues-like rather than blues, each of them blending ideas and devices from a variety of sources – soul, rock, jazz, gospel – with a sophistication beyond the reach of their forerunners".

== Album discography ==
| Album title | Record label | Year of release |
|---|---|---|
| Sleeping with a Stranger | HighTone Records | 1995 |
| Dark Night | HighTone Records | 1998 |
| Got It Goin' On | HighTone Records | 2000 |
| Blues At The Border | Catfood Records | 2011 |
| Guitar Angels | Catfood Records | 2014 |
| Bright Day, Blue Shore | Catfood Records | 2015 |
| Blues Been Good to Me | Catfood Records | 2017 |

== See also ==
- List of soul-blues musicians
- List of electric blues musicians
