= Rockpalast: Blues Rock Legends Vol. 3 =

Live album by Johnny Winter
- Released: February 25, 2011
- Recorded: April 21, 1979
- Venue: Grugahalle (Essen, Germany)
- Genre: Blues rock
- Length: 118:23
- Label: MIG

Johnny Winter chronology
Live Bootleg Series Vol. 7 (2011)	Rockpalast: Blues Rock Legends Vol. 3 (2011)	Roots (2011)

Rockpalast: Blues Rock Legends Vol. 3 is a two-CD live album by guitarist and singer Johnny Winter. It was recorded on April 21, 1979, at the Grugahalle in Essen, Germany. It was released in Germany by MIG Records on February 25, 2011. It was also released as a concert video on DVD.

This performance was originally broadcast live on the television show Rockpalast. The concert that night was by the J. Geils Band, followed by Patti Smith, and then Johnny Winter.

== Critical reception ==
Red Lick said, "... it's your usual Winter performance with frenzied clusters of powerful notes, tons of terrific solos, hard grinding rhythm guitar and croaky vocals bawled out at full volume until Johnny and the audience are exhausted and delirious."

== Track listing ==
Disc 1

1. "Hideaway" (Freddie King) – 11:02
2. "Messin' with the Kid" (Mel London) – 7:47
3. "Walking By Myself" (Jimmy Rogers) – 8:27
4. "Mississippi Blues" (traditional, arranged by Johnny Winter) – 18:12
5. "Divin' Duck" (Sleepy John Estes) – 6:33
6. "Johnny B. Goode" (Chuck Berry) – 6:53

Disc 2

1. "Suzie Q" (Dale Hawkins, Stan Lewis, Eleanor Broadwater) – 13:14
2. Drum solo (Bob Torello) – 10:43
3. "I'm Ready" (Pearl King, Ruth Durand, Joe Robichaux) – 5:48
4. "Rockabilly Boogie" (traditional, arranged by Winter) – 6:06
5. Medley (Winter) – 15:26
6. "Jumpin' Jack Flash" (Mick Jagger, Keith Richards) – 7:50

== Personnel ==
Musicians

- Johnny Winter – guitar, vocals
- Jon Paris – bass
- Bob Torello – drums

Production

- Egon Bröse – sound recording
- Hoppi – audio mastering
- Ernst Höller – technical director
- Wilhelm Lang – production manager
- Peter Rüchel – executive producer, liner notes
- Manfred Becker – photos
