= Step Back (album) =

2014 studio album by Johnny Winter

Studio album by Johnny Winter
- Released: September 2, 2014
- Genre: Blues
- Length: 50:33
- Label: Megaforce
- Producer: Paul Nelson

Johnny Winter chronology
Live Bootleg Series Vol. 11 (2014)	Step Back (2014)	Remembrance Vol. 1 (2015)

Step Back is the nineteenth and final studio album by blues guitarist and singer Johnny Winter. It features performances by a number of guest musicians, including Jason Ricci, Eric Clapton, Dr. John, Lou Marini and Tom Malone from The Blues Brothers Band, Billy Gibbons from ZZ Top, Joe Perry from Aerosmith, Leslie West from Mountain (Winter had guested on West's Still Climbing the previous year), and Brian Setzer from the Stray Cats. It was released by Megaforce Records on September 2, 2014.

As on Winter's previous studio album, Roots, the songs are mainly blues standards. Roots and Step Back were both produced by his guitarist Paul Nelson.

Step Back was released posthumously. Winter had finished recording the album, and then played a concert tour in Europe, before he died on July 16, 2014. The album debuted at No. 1 on the Billboard charts for Blues Albums and Independent Albums, and at No. 17 on the Billboard 200.

At the 2015 Grammy Awards, Step Back won the Grammy Award for Best Blues Album. Step Back also won the 2015 Blues Music Award for Best Rock Blues Album.

== Critical reception ==
Professional ratings
Aggregate scores
Source	Rating
Metacritic	68/100
Review scores
Source	Rating
Allmusic	3.5/5 stars
Rolling Stone	3/5 stars
Record Collector	3/5 stars

On AllMusic, Steve Leggett said, "Produced by Winter's guitarist, Paul Nelson, the album is full of gritty, soaring guitar, the kind of straightforward blues-rock style Winter has always been known for, and it's obvious over his last two albums that Winter still found joy and excitement in it all, and he went out playing perhaps as well as he ever had, having learned the nuances of these classic blues songs inside and out.... It's all solid, and it's comforting to know that Winter went out in peace with the blues and his legacy, and most importantly, without his skills diminishing."

In Rolling Stone, Patrick Doyle wrote, "Winter's final album, Step Back, doesn't always match his early grit... [T]he new LP draws from the Fifties electric blues Winter heard as a teenager.... The highlight comes late, when Winter plays a loose solo acoustic take of Son House's "Death Letter" — a rare understated moment that proves even without his Gibson Firebird, Winter could go back to the Delta with the best of them."

In Glide Magazine, Doug Collette said, "Based on its selection of elemental blues and rock material, Johnny Winter's Step Back is a logical extension of his previous record, the more literally conceived and executed Roots. The late Texan's final studio album lives up to the broad perspective at which its title hints with diverse arrangements that illustrate his versatility.... Just as Johnny Winter’s live performances in recent years reaffirmed the legitimacy of his influence on generations of musicians, so does Step Back add final punctuation to a life-long statement of musical purpose."

In the Seattle Post-Intelligencer, Wesley Britton wrote, "... in short order, the vibrancy, energy, and variety of what I heard blew all my preconceived blues away. Instead, I was taken back in time as Step Back is a collection of covers where Winter repeated the same formula of his 2011 Roots where Winter and a cast of all-star friends offered their takes on some memorable rock and blues classics. In a very real sense, Roots and Step Back, both produced by guitarist Paul Nelson, are appropriate full-circle collaborations where Winter et al show their affection for the music that inspired and influenced them all those years ago."

On Write a Music Review, Keith Hannaleck said, "Fortunately for music fans [Winter] completed his final album before passing away and it will likely go down as one of his very best. Step Back is a guitar hero tribute, not just for Johnny but for those players that admired him and had the honor of being part of the project.... Winter’s voice is strong throughout and his guitar playing is clear and concise.... Winter was always a star and before he left this earth he burned as bright as ever with Step Back. I believe he will finally get his Grammy with this monumental accomplishment.... Long live the blues and the music of Johnny Winter; this was one hell of an exit for one of the greatest guitar players on the planet."

== Track listing ==
No.	Title	Writer(s)	With	Length
1.	"Unchain My Heart"	Bobby Sharp	Blues Brothers Horns	3:15
2.	"Can't Hold Out (Talk to Me Baby)"	Willie Dixon	Ben Harper (lap slide guitar, vocals)	4:09
3.	"Don't Want No Woman"	Don Robey	Eric Clapton (guitar)	3:07
4.	"Killing Floor"	Howlin' Wolf	Paul Nelson (guitar)	4:28
5.	"Who Do You Love"	Bo Diddley	—	2:52
6.	"Okie Dokie Stomp"	Clarence "Gatemouth" Brown	Brian Setzer (guitar)	2:58
7.	"Where Can You Be"	Jimmy Reed	Billy Gibbons (guitar)	3:58
8.	"Sweet Sixteen"	B.B. King, Joe Josea	Joe Bonamassa (guitar)	7:57
9.	"Death Letter"	Son House	—	3:39
10.	"My Babe"	Willie Dixon	Jason Ricci (harmonica)	4:25
11.	"Long Tall Sally"	Little Richard, Robert Blackwell, Enotris Johnson	Leslie West (guitar)	2:53
12.	"Mojo Hand"	Lightnin' Hopkins	Joe Perry (guitar)	3:49
13.	"Blue Monday"	Dave Bartholomew	Dr. John (piano)	3:02

== Personnel ==
Musicians

- Johnny Winter – guitar, steel guitar, vocals
- Paul Nelson – guitar
- Scott Spray – bass
- Tommy Curiale – drums
- Mike DiMeo – piano on "Don't Want No Woman", "Who Do You Love", "Okie Dokie Stomp", "My Babe", "Long Tall Sally", "Blue Monday"; Hammond B-3 organ on "Unchain My Heart", "Sweet Sixteen"
- Tom "Bones" Malone – trombone on "Unchain My Heart", "Okie Dokie Stomp", "Sweet Sixteen", "Blue Monday"
- "Blue" Lou Marini – tenor saxophone on "Unchain My Heart", "Okie Dokie Stomp", "Sweet Sixteen", "Blue Monday"
- Joe Meo – alto saxophone on "Unchain My Heart", "Okie Dokie Stomp", "Sweet Sixteen", "Blue Monday"
- Don Harris – trumpet on "Unchain My Heart", "Okie Dokie Stomp", "Sweet Sixteen", "Blue Monday"
- Frank "King Bee" Latorre – harmonica on "Killing Floor"
- Meredith Dimenna – backing vocals on "Who Do You Love"
- Wendy Brown Rashad – backing vocals on "Unchain My Heart"
- Shauna Jackson – backing vocals on "Unchain My Heart"
- Cynthia Tharpe – backing vocals on "Unchain My Heart"

Production

- Producer: Paul Nelson
- Recording engineer: Brendan Muldowney
- Assistant recording engineers: Ian Callanan, Mikhail Pivovarov, Nicholas Wells
- Mixing: Mike "Metal" Goldberg
- Mastering: Greg Calbi
- Art direction, design: Stephen Jensen
- Photography: Michael Weintrob, Marty Temme

== Charts ==
Chart	Peak position
Billboard Blues Albums	1
Billboard Independent Albums	1
Billboard 200	17
Danish Albums (Hitlisten)	30
