= Roots (Johnny Winter album) =

2011 studio album by Johnny Winter

Studio album by Johnny Winter
- Released: September 27, 2011
- Genre: Blues
- Length: 52:34
- Label: Megaforce
- Producer: Paul Nelson

Johnny Winter chronology
Rockpalast: Blues Rock Legends Vol. 3 (2011)	Roots (2011)	Setlist: The Very Best of Johnny Winter Live (2011)

Roots is an album by blues guitarist and singer Johnny Winter. His first studio album in seven years, it was released by Megaforce Records on September 27, 2011.

On Roots, Winter and his band perform eleven blues standards. Each song features a different guest performer. These featured musical artists include Warren Haynes, Derek Trucks, John Popper, Vince Gill, and Johnny's brother Edgar Winter.

Roots was Johnny Winter's penultimate studio album. Before he died on July 16, 2014, he had largely completed work on Step Back, which was released on September 2, 2014.

== Production ==
In a 2012 interview, Roots producer and guitarist Paul Nelson said, "Johnny used to play with Eric Clapton on these "Crossroads" projects every four years or so, and he'd always include one or two of these traditional songs on every album. We thought, why not do an album of all traditional songs that everyone loves? I asked Johnny to pick out the songs and it took him 15 minutes. I had these different musicians in mind and I knew how they'd fit. It was an honor to do."

Winter recorded the lead vocal tracks with a single take for each song. He explained to keyboardist Mike DiMeo, "If I can't get it the first time, I can't get it."

== Critical reception ==
Professional ratings
Review scores
Source	Rating
Allmusic	4/5 stars

On AllMusic, Steve Leggett said, "... this isn't one of those "let's help out the old guitar player explore his roots" kind of blues album. Technically it is, perhaps, but this is every square inch Winter's album. He sings here as well as he ever has and his guitar playing is powerful and brilliant, like it always is, and he's diving into songs and material that he's always emulated — the end result is a coherently shaped, explosive, vibrant, and joyous set of Winter at his best doing what he loves the best.... Roots is easily one of the best blues albums of the year, and with the raw yet elegant grace that Winter brings to these songs, it's also one of the finest albums of his long career."

On About.com Blues, Keith A. Gordon wrote, "For what is essentially only his second new album in nearly two decades, Winter rounded up some friends to accompany him in the studio. It's a mark of the guitarist's status in the blues world that he managed to bring in such talents as Sonny Landreth, Warren Haynes, Susan Tedeschi, and Derek Trucks, among others, for the recording of Roots, a straight-talking, hard-rocking collection of blues and R&B standards. With so many gifted musicians surrounding him, you'd think that Winter could leave a lot of the heavy lifting to others, but that's not the case here — Roots is one of the best albums of his lengthy career, the guitarist playing and singing with the same belly full of fire that he brought to his work in the 1980s."

On Guitar-Muse.com, Oscar Jordan said, "It's a surprisingly energetic and impassioned record from the sixty-seven-year-old Winter, but he gets an assist from some stellar guests. Derek Trucks joins him on a killer version of "Dust My Broom". Old blood and new blood intermingle on this blazing slide guitar fest to great affect [sic]. The same goes for Winter's cover of "T-Bone Shuffle" with Sonny Landreth. These tracks are pretty much a tutorial on the use of excellent slide playing, with everybody delivering the goodies at the top of their game.... If you're looking for a record that harkens back to Winter's early 70s fire-breathing blues-rock heyday, you won't find it here. But true blues fans will get a kick out of this record."

== Track listing ==
No.	Title	Writer(s)	Featuring	Length
1.	"T-Bone Shuffle"	T-Bone Walker	Sonny Landreth (guitar)	4:54
2.	"Further On Up the Road"	Joe Medwick	Jimmy Vivino (guitar)	4:18
3.	"Done Somebody Wrong"	Elmore James	Warren Haynes (guitar)	4:47
4.	"Got My Mojo Working"	Preston Foster	Frank Latorre (harmonica)	5:09
5.	"Last Night"	Little Walter	John Popper (harmonica)	5:47
6.	"Maybellene"	Chuck Berry	Vince Gill (guitar)	2:49
7.	"Bright Lights, Big City"	Jimmy Reed	Susan Tedeschi (guitar, vocals)	4:28
8.	"Honky Tonk"	Billy Butler, Bill Doggett, Clifford Scott, Shep Shepherd	Edgar Winter (saxophone)	3:43
9.	"Dust My Broom"	Robert Johnson	Derek Trucks (guitar)	6:04
10.	"Short Fat Fannie"	Larry Williams	Paul Nelson (guitar)	4:07
11.	"Come Back Baby"	Walter Davis	John Medeski (organ)	6:28

== Personnel ==
=== Musicians ===
- Johnny Winter – guitar, vocals
- Paul Nelson – guitar
- Scott Spray – bass
- Vito Liuzzi – drums
- Mike DiMeo – keyboards on "T-Bone Shuffle", "Further On Up the Road", "Done Somebody Wrong", "Maybellene", "Bright Lights, Big City", "Honky Tonk", "Come Back Baby"
- Johnny Montagnese – hand claps on "Honky Tonk"
- Joe Meo – saxophone on "Short Fat Fannie", "Come Back Baby"
- Don Harris – trumpet on "Come Back Baby"

=== Production ===
- Produced by Paul Nelson
- Recording, mixing: Brendan Muldowney
- Art direction, design: Stephen Jensen
- Photography: Louis Torrieri, Neil Zlozower
