= Paul Nelson (musician) =

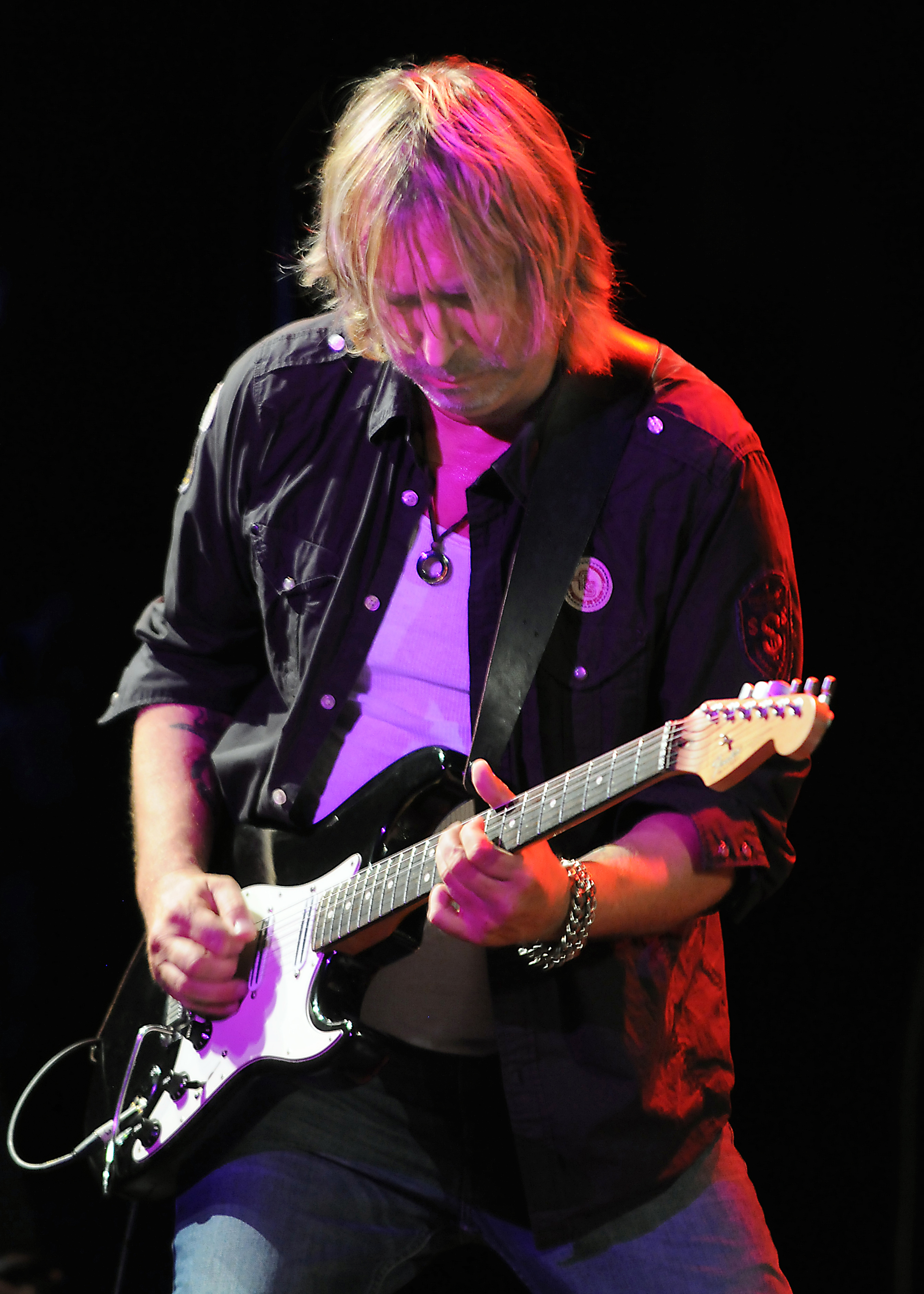

Background information
- Born: October 18, 1960; New York City, New York, U.S.
- Died: March 10, 2024 (aged 63)
- Genres: Blues, rock, pop, funk, jam R&B
- Occupations: Musician; songwriter; arranger; record producer; performer
- Instrument: Guitar
- Labels: Sony, Virgin, Sony Japan, EMI, Megaforce, Mascot, Universal, Friday Music, Warner, Metal Blade, Lion, Century Media, Drive-Thru, Cleopatra Records, NBC, WWE, TNN
- Formerly of: Paul Nelson Band
- Website: paulnelsonguitar.com

Paul Nelson (October 18, 1960 – March 10, 2024) was an American, Grammy Award winning blues and rock guitarist, record producer and songwriter. He played and or recorded alongside artists such as Eric Clapton, Buddy Guy, and members of the Allman Brothers Band. He was the hand-picked guitarist to join Johnny Winter's band in 2010, performing on and producing several of Winter's albums, including the Grammy Award-nominated I'm a Blues Man, Roots, and Step Back, which won the Grammy Award for Best Blues Album, debuted at number one on the Billboard chart for Blues Albums, and Independent Albums, and debuted at number 16 on the Billboard 200 albums chart, marking the highest spot in Winter's career. Nelson was also a Blues Music Award recipient for Best Rock Blues Album, was inducted into the New York Blues Hall of Fame, and was a recipient of the KBA award from the Blues Foundation. He received a Grammy nomination for his work as producer and performer on Joe Louis Walker's Everybody Wants a Piece.

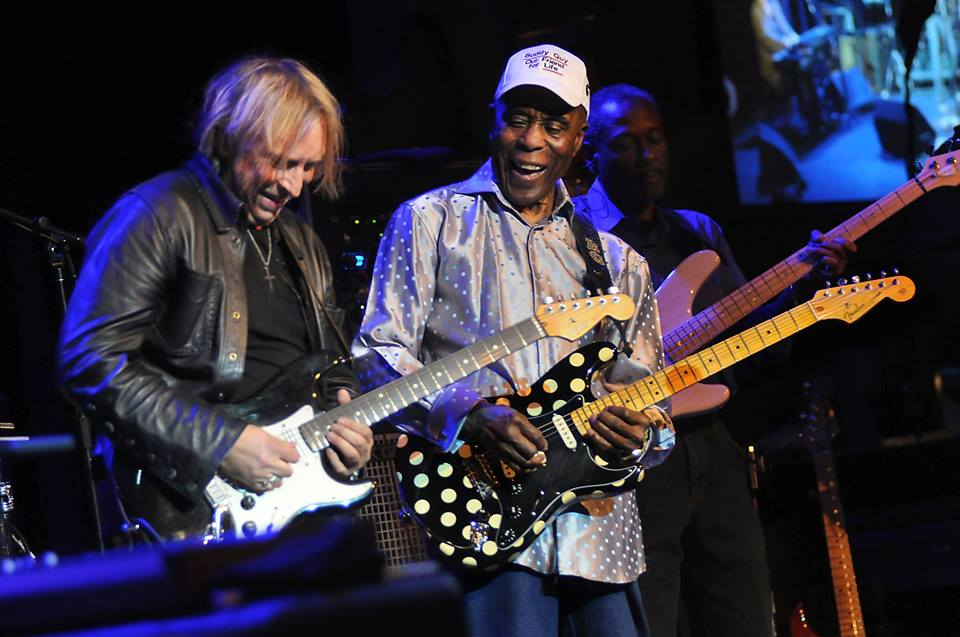

== Career ==
Paul Nelson was credited as being a composer and performer for music heard on international and national television broadcasts such as NBC, TNN, and UPN, as well as for the WWE and was featured in many publications such as Rolling Stone, Billboard, USA Today, Guitar World, Guitar Player, Premier Guitar, Classic Rock, and Vintage Guitar magazines. His solo guitar work can be heard on his first solo CD, entitled Look, and his Sony/EMI album release Badass Generation. He also performed on the Halifax song "Anthem For Tonight" from their album The Inevitability of a Strange World, and featured on the Xbox 360 game Prey. Nelson also produced many albums, including 14 albums for Johnny Winter's Live Bootleg series (all breaking the top 10 in the Billboard Blues Chart); plus Martin Barre's Live at the Factory Underground.

Nelson produced and performed on Joe Louis Walker's Everybody Wants a Piece, for which he received a Grammy Nomination; and a James Montgomery album featuring Jimmy Vivino (Conan O'Brien), Mark Naftalin (of Paul Butterfield Blues Band), Grace Kelly (Stephen Colbert) and the Uptown Horns (Rolling Stones, James Brown). He also produced albums for Leo "Bud" Welch, Lance Lopez — Live From NYC, Tyler Morris — Next in Line, and Otis — Eyes of the Sun.

Nelson executive produced and appeared in the Johnny Winter documentary Down And Dirty, directed by Greg Oliver. He also appeared in the documentary Sidemen: Long Road To Glory alongside Gregg Allman, Bonnie Raitt, Elvin Bishop, Pinetop Perkins, and Hubert Sumlin.

== Early years ==
Nelson was born in Manhattan, New York. His love for music and the guitar started at an early age listening to and playing blues, rock, pop, jazz, fusion, country, funk, and Southern rock, becoming inspired by guitar players Billy Gibbons, Jeff Beck, Robben Ford, Larry Carlton, Johnny Winter, Albert Collins, Freddie King, Stevie Ray Vaughan, Joe Satriani, Jimi Hendrix, B.B. King, and Duane Allman. Wanting to pursue music as a career, he enrolled into Berklee College of Music, quickly discovering Miles Davis, John Coltrane, and Wes Montgomery. It was soon after he began studying privately with Steve Vai, Mike Stern, and Steve Khan. Nelson soon built a name for himself as an "A" list session player, and was on the first call list for guitar spots for many national and international performing artists. This later led to his teaming up with rock and blues icon Johnny Winter.

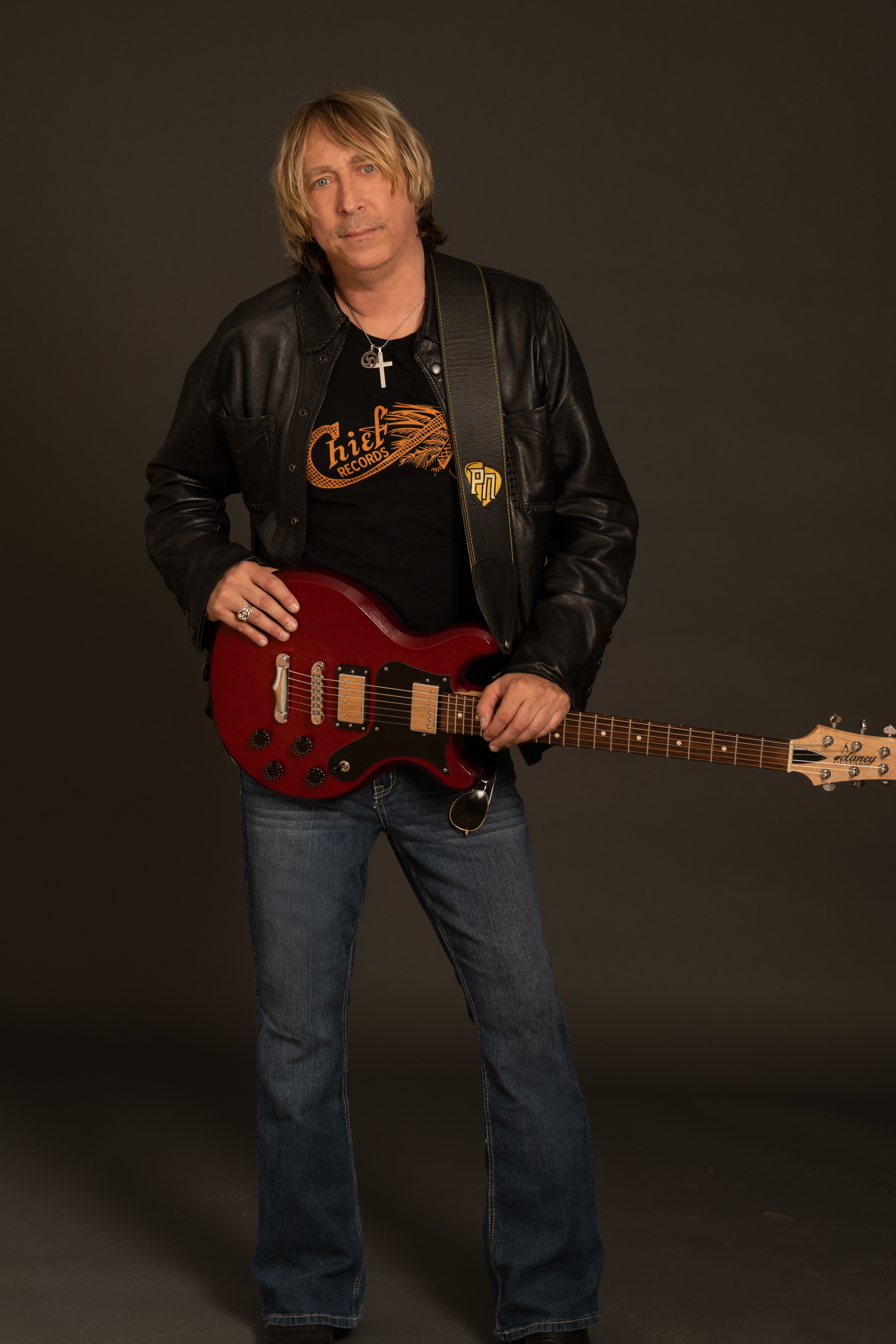

== Later career ==
Nelson toured the world, sharing the stage and recording with top artists such as Buddy Guy, Johnny Winter, Eric Clapton, Billy Gibbons, Vince Gill, Slash, Brian Setzer, Joe Perry, Derek Trucks, Edgar Winter, Ben Harper, Hubert Sumlin, Rick Derringer, Robben Ford, Joe Bonamassa, James Cotton, Steve Vai, Sonny Landreth, Earl Slick, Bob Margolin, Dickey Betts, Mark Knopfler, Bobby Rush, Joe Walsh, Pat Travers, Brent Mason, Larry Carlton, Elvin Bishop, Derek St. Holmes, Kim Simmonds/Savoy Brown, Gov't Mule, Anders Osborne, Quinn Sullivan, Los Lobos, Lucky Peterson, Samantha Fish, Ana Popović, Jon Herington, Ronnie Baker Brooks, JT Taylor, Joe Louis Walker, Popa Chubby, Bobby Rush, Ricky Byrd, Mark Naftalin, Ronnie Earl, Susan Tedeschi, G-Love, Jeff Timmons, Jerry Portnoy, Samantha Fish, Uptown Horns, Harvey Brooks, Steven Seagal, Bill Evans, Magic Slim, Coco Montoya, Reese Wynans, Kid Ramos, Scott Sharrard, Ray Davies, George Lynch, Kenny Wayne Shepherd, Ana Popović, Anthony Jackson, Tom Hambridge, Junior Brown, John Medeski, Ron Holloway, Jimmy Vivino of Late Night With Conan O'Brien, Paul Schaffer's CBS Orchestra, and the Blues Brothers Horns. He appeared on Late Night With David Letterman and Jimmy Kimmel Live. Nelson released his first solo instrumental album entitled Look, and then signed with Sony Music Group for the Paul Nelson Band album Badass Generation, and international tours.

Nelson produced Shaw Davis & the Black Ties' third album, Red Sun Rebellion (2021).

On March 12, 2024, Nelson's management, Bullseye Management, announced on Instagram that he had died from a heart attack, on March 10, aged 63, while on the road touring.

== Selected discography ==
- The Worldwide Mega-Book of Heavy Metal Bands (Rock & Roll Reference Series) (book) (feat. artist)
- Wacken Open Air documentory (feat. guitarist/interview)
- Look – Paul Nelson BWB Records (solo album)
- Warmth in the Wilderness: A Tribute to Jason Becker – Lion Records "Blue" (feat. guitarist)
- Gigs From Hell: True Stories From Rock and Roll's Frontline (book) (feat. story)
- A Return To Fantasy: A Tribute To Uriah Heep Century Media Records – various artists (feat. artist)
- A-Z of Power Metal (Rockdetector) (book/CD) (feat. artist)
- Beyond Inspiration: A Tribute to Uli Jon Roth – Lion Music "Pagannini Paraphrase (feat. guitarist)
- I'm a Bluesman Virgin Records – Johnny Winter (guitarist/writer)
- The Collector's Guide To Heavy Metal (book) (feat. artist)
- Prey – Xbox 360 game
- The Mob (producer)
- The Inevitability of a Strange World – Halifax Drive Thru Records (guest guitarist)
- Pigswear EMI/Virgin (producer)
- Johnny Winter Live Bootleg Series Volume 1 (producer)
- Warmth in the Wilderness, Vol. II: A Tribute to Jason Becker – various artists (feat. guitarist)
- Johnny Winter Live Bootleg Series Volume 2 (producer)
- Johnny Winter Live Bootleg Series Volume 3 (producer)
- Johnny Winter Live Bootleg Series Volume 4 (producer)
- Raisin' Cain: The Wild and Raucous Story of Johnny Winter (book) (feat. artist)
- Live On The Legendary Rhythm & Blues Cruise – Joe Louis Walker (guest guitarist)
- Johnny Winter Plays The Blues Cherry Lane (instructional book/CD) (guest guitarist)
- Roots – Johnny Winter Megaforce Records (guitarist/producer)
- Live From Japan – Johnny Winter – DVD EMI (guitarist/producer)
- True to the Blues: The Johnny Winter Story – Johnny Winter Sony Legacy (ex. producer)
- Step Back Sony/Megaforce – Johnny Winter (guitarist/producer)
- Everybody Wants a Piece – Joe Louis Walker Mascot Records (guest guitarist/producer)
- Blues Christmas Cleopatra Records – various artists
- Southern Rock Christmas Cleopatra Records – various artists
- XFL Televised Football League NBC TNN UPN (guitarist/music composer)
- Live From NYC Cleopatra Records – Lance Lopez (producer)
- Badass GenerationSony Records/EMI – Paul Nelson Band (solo album)
- Johnny Winter: Down and Dirty Megaforce/EMI documentary (feat. artist)
- Sidemen: Long Road To Glory documentary (feat. artist)
- The James Montgomery Blues Band Cleopatra Records – James Montgomery (guest guitarist/producer)
- Life of a Dreamer Blue Canoe Records – Yonrico Scott (Derek Trucks) (guest guitarist)
- 10,000 Feet Below E H Records – Eliza Neals "Cold Cold Night" (feat. Paul Nelson)
- InstrumentHead – Michael Weintrob photography book (feat. artist)
- Eyes of the Sun Cleopatra Records – Otis (guest guitarist/ex. producer)
- Next in Line Vizztone Records – Tyler Morris (producer)
- Live at the Underground Pilot Light Records – Martin Barre (producer)
- All I Got for Christmas was the Blues and a Broken Heart (Paul Nelson and Anthony Krizan – Spin Doctors)
- Rise Up (Harper and the Midwest Kind) (guest guitarist)
- Borrowed Time (Memphis Lightning) (guest guitarist)
- Consider This Thread City Records (Patty Tuite) (guest guitarist/producer)
- Red Sun Rebellion Sony (Shaw Davis & the Black Ties (producer)
- Hard Case of the Blues Thread City Records – Patty Tuite (guitarist/producer)
- Prestidigitation – Tobin Mueller (guitarist)
- My Time to Shine – Jureesa McBride (guitarist/producer)
- Grab Brothers (Pilot Light Records) – Grab Brothers (guest guitarist/producer)
- It Ain't Easy (Pilot Light Records) – Joshua Morris (guest guitarist/producer)
- InstrumentHead Revealed – Michael Weintrob photography book (feat. artist)
- Too Much Blues (Pilot Light Records) – Willie J Laws (guest guitarist/producer)
- Guitar Head (Deko Records/Warner) – Marcus Rezak (producer)
- Ready to Rock (For the Love of King/Bootsy Collins Foundation Album #11 with Paul McCartny) (various artists)
- Traces of Yesterday (Deko/Warner) – Zero One Zero (producer)
