= Great Guitars (band) =

Great Guitars was a supergroup formed by jazz guitarists Charlie Byrd, Herb Ellis, and Barney Kessel in 1973.

The trio performed intermittently from 1973 and released several live albums: Great Guitars (1975), Great Guitars 2 (1976), Great Guitars at the Winery (1980), Great Guitars: Straight Tracks (1991), Return of the Great Guitars (1996), Great Guitars Concord Jazz (2005). After a stroke ended Kessel's career in 1992, Ron Escheté, Mundell Lowe, Larry Coryell, and Tal Farlow variously joined Byrd and Ellis in later concerts.
