= Anthony Gomes =

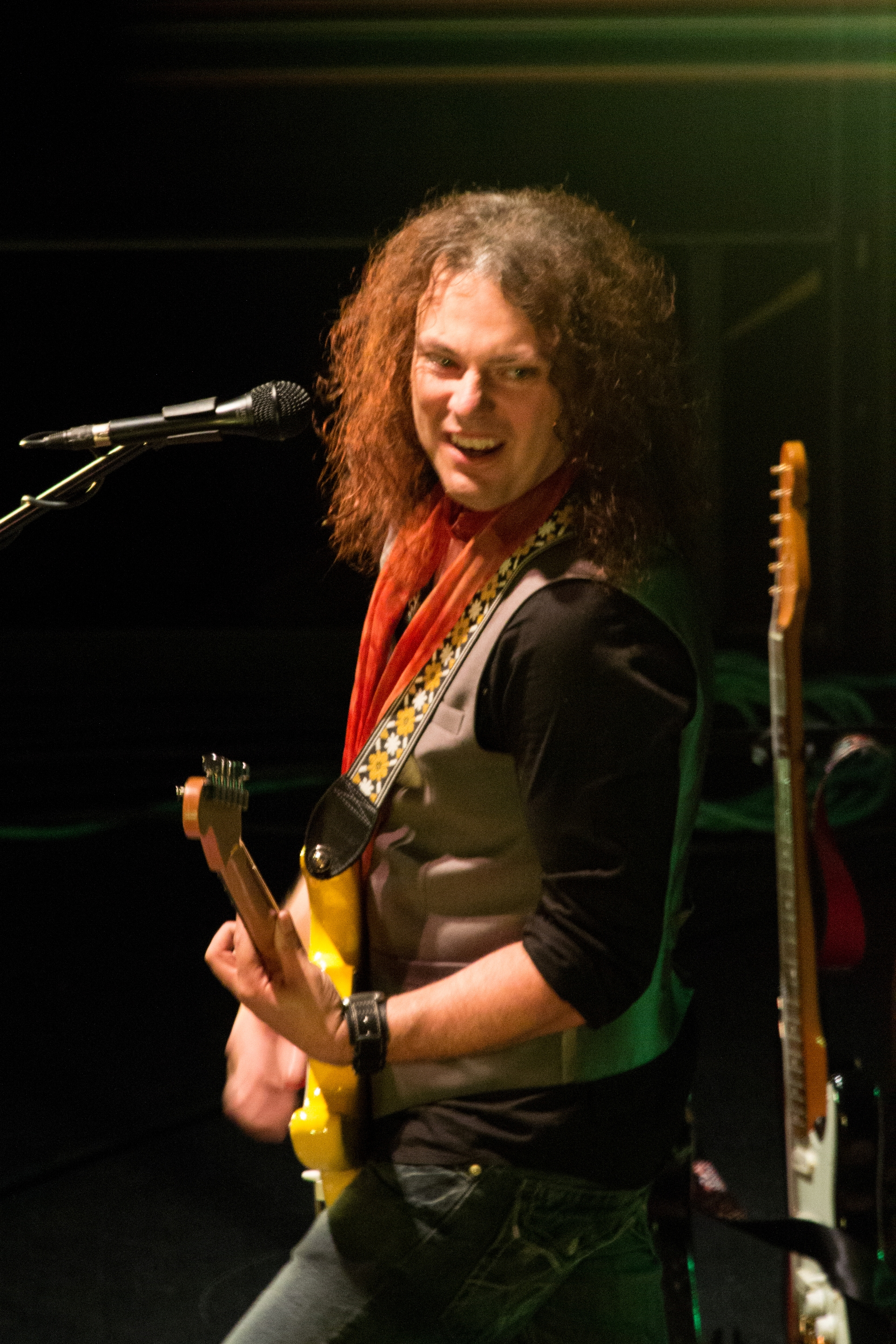

Background information
- Born: Anthony Gomes Kay; May 14, 1970 (age 56); Toronto, Ontario, Canada
- Genres: Southern rock, blues rock, blues
- Occupations: Musician, singer-songwriter
- Instruments: Guitar, vocals
- Years active: 1998–present
- Website: http://www.anthonygomes.com

Anthony Gomes (born May 14, 1970, Toronto, Ontario, Canada) is a Canadian blues and blues rock guitarist and singer. He was born to a Portuguese father and a French-Canadian mother. After his 1998 debut album release Blues in Technicolor, he began touring the United States and Canada and he has since recorded fourteen more studio albums.

Gomes resides in St. Louis, Missouri, United States, playing a fusion of blues with rock and soul, and with the Anthony Gomes Band has toured North America and Europe.

== Discography ==
- 1997: Primary Colors (Urban Electric Records 1108)
- 1998: Blues in Technicolor (Urban Electric Records 1109)
- 2000: Sweet Stringin' Soul (Urban Electric Records 1110)
- 2002: Unity (33rd Street Records 3313; Up 2 Zero Entertainment 1111)
- 2006: Music Is The Medicine (Up 2 Zero Entertainment 1112; Adrenaline Records/ADA 40023; Ruf Records 1138)
- 2006: Long Way Home (Up 2 Zero Entertainment 1113) reissue of 1997 indie album
- 2008: Anthony Gomes LIVE (Ruf Records 1136; Up 2 Zero Entertainment 1120)
- 2008: Primary Colors (Up 2 Zero Entertainment 1122) reissue
- 2009: New Soul Cowboys (Up 2 Zero Entertainment 1119)
- 2012: Up 2 Zero (Up 2 Zero Entertainment 1115)
- 2013: ...Before The Beginning [all acoustic album] (Up 2 Zero Entertainment 1117)
- 2014: Rebel Blue [compilation] (Up 2 Zero Entertainment)
- 2015: Electric Field Holler (Up 2 Zero Entertainment 1121)
- 2018: Peace, Love & Loud Guitars (Up 2 Zero Entertainment 1123)
- 2018: New Soul Cowboys: Coming Back For You (Up 2 Zero Entertainment 1127)
- 2020: Containment Blues (Up 2 Zero Entertainment 1130)
- 2022: High Voltage Blues (Rat Pak Records 603432)
- 2025: Praise The Loud (Rat Pak Records 817127)

== Awards ==
- 1998: Buddy Guy's Legends "Best Unsigned Blues Band"
- 2003: BluesWax Artist of the Year
