= Blue Soul (Joe Louis Walker album) =

Studio album by Joe Louis Walker
- Released: 1989
- Genre: Blues
- Label: HighTone
- Producer: Joe Louis Walker

Joe Louis Walker chronology
The Gift (1988)	Blue Soul (1989)	Live at Slim's, Volume One (1991)

Blue Soul is an album by the American musician Joe Louis Walker, released in 1989. Walker supported the album with a North American tour, backed by the Boss Talkers. Blue Soul was nominated for a Bammie Award for "Outstanding Blues Album".

== Production ==
The album was produced by Walker; he also wrote the horn arrangements. It incorporated hard blues, gospel, and folk blues sounds. "Personal Baby" is about the virtues of fidelity in a relationship. David Hidalgo played accordion on "Ain't Nothin' Goin' On". "I'll Get to Heaven on My Own" is performed with just Walker's voice and slide guitar. "Prove Your Love" is a soul song with overdubbed vocals.

== Critical reception ==
Professional ratings
Review scores
Source	Rating
AllMusic	4.5/5 stars
Chicago Tribune	3/4 stars
Robert Christgau	B
The Encyclopedia of Popular Music	4/5 stars
MusicHound Blues: The Essential Album Guide	4.5/5 stars
The Penguin Guide to Blues Recordings	4/4 stars
Tulsa Tribune	4/4 stars

Robert Christgau deemed the "unsoullike, unaccompanied" "I'll Get to Heaven on My Own" as the album's "standout" song. The New York Times wrote that Walker's voice "is weather-beaten but ready for more; his guitar solos are fast, wiry and incisive, often starting out with impetuous squiggles before moaning with bluesy despair." The Fayetteville Observer warned that "Walker nears Las Vegas-style schmaltz on a couple of early tracks."

The Province noted that Walker "applies his light-fingered, spare guitar style to a variety of blues-styling, including soul and gospel." The Chicago Tribune stated that Walker has "a contemporary style heavily influenced by B.B. King and the Stax sound, an impressive ability on guitar and an appealing vocal style marked a strangely velvety cragginess."

AllMusic praised the "vicious guitar from one of the hottest relatively young bluesmen on the circuit."

== Track listing ==
No.	Title	Length
1.	"Prove Your Love"
2.	"Ain't Nothin' Goin' On"
3.	"T.L.C."
4.	"Personal Baby"
5.	"Since You've Been Gone"
6.	"Alligator"
7.	"Dead Sea"
8.	"City of Angels"
9.	"I'll Get to Heaven on My Own"
