= Great Guitars (Joe Louis Walker album) =

Studio album by Joe Louis Walker
- Released: April 8, 1997
- Genre: Blues
- Length: 58:37
- Label: Polygram
- Producers: Joe Louis Walker; Ike Turner; Steve Cropper; John Snyder

Joe Louis Walker chronology
Blues of the Month Club (1995)	Great Guitars (1997)	Preacher and the President (1998)

Professional ratings
Review scores
Source	Rating
Uncut	4/5 stars

Great Guitars is an album by blues guitarist Joe Louis Walker. It was released in 1997 on the Polygram label as catalogue number 537141.

Many of the songs on the album are duets with other artists. The album received mostly favourable reviews upon its release.

== Track listing ==
1. "Low Down Dirty Blues" (Walker) – 6:57
2. "First Degree" (Turner, Walker) – 4:22
3. "Mile-Hi Club" (Walker) – 6:08
4. "Fix Our Love" (Walker) – 6:05
5. "Every Girl I See (Looks Good to Me)" (Dixon, Murphy) – 6:01
6. "Cold and Evil Night" (Walker) – 5:23
7. "Hop on It" (Grand, Walker) – 2:24
8. "Nighttime" (Walker) – 5:49
9. "Sugar" (Walker) – 6:21
10. "In God's Hands" (Walker) – 4:28
11. "High Blood Pressure" (Walker) – 4:39

== Personnel ==
Musicians

- Joe Louis Walker: vocals, guitar, slide guitar, percussion, foot stomping, arrangements
- Tom Rose: guitar, backing vocals
- Mike Eppley: organ, piano, backing vocals
- Joe Thomas: bass, backing vocals
- Curtis Nutall: drums

Guest musicians

- Bonnie Raitt: vocals, slide guitar on "Low Down Dirty Blues"
- Ike Turner: guitar, keyboards, bass, tambourine on "First Degree"
- Scotty Moore: guitar on "Mile-Hi Club"
- Little Charlie Baty: guitar on "Mile-Hi Club"
- Steve Cropper: guitar on "Mile-Hi Club"
- Clarence Gatemouth Brown: guitar on "Mile-Hi Club"
- Otis Rush: vocals, guitar on "Fix Our Love"
- Buddy Guy: guitar on ""Every Girl I See (Looks Good to Me)"
- Otis Grand: rhythm guitar, lap-steel guitar on "Hop on It"
- Steve Diamond: piano on "Hop on It"
- Steve Gomes: bass on "Hop on It"
- Rob Stupka: drums on "Hop on It"
- Matt "Guitar" Murphy: guitar on "Nighttime"
- Taj Mahal: national steel guitar, ratchet guitar, foot stomping on "In God's Hands"
- Robert Lockwood, Jr.: 12-string electric guitar on "High Blood Pressure"
- Charles "D.C." Carnes: rhythm guitar on "High Blood Pressure"
- Wallace Coleman: harmonica on "High Blood Pressure"
- Richard Smith: bass on "High Blood Pressure"
- Jimmy "Gator" Hoare: drums on "High Blood Pressure"
- The Tower of Power Horns:

Bill Churchville: horn arrangements, trumpet
Barry Danielian: horn arrangements, trumpet
Stephen "Doc" Kupka: baritone saxophone
Emilio Castillo: tenor saxophone
John Scarpulla: tenor saxophone

- The Johnny Nocturne Horns:

George Spencer: trumpet
Marty Wehner: horn arrangements, trombone
Rob Sudduth: baritone saxophone
John Firmin: tenor saxophone

Production

- Produced by Joe Louis Walker, Ike Turner, Steve Cropper, John Snyder
- Executive producer: Jean-Philippe Allard.
- Engineered by Scotty Moore, David Luke, Howard Willing, Jay Newland, Jim Albert, Ken Kessie, Mark Hewitt, Mike Creswell, Paul Haumann, Stephen Hart, Steve Spaperri
- Assistant Engineers: Ben Conrad, John Brant, Ron Black.
- Mastered by Chris Bellman.
