= Eric Tessmer =

Guitarist

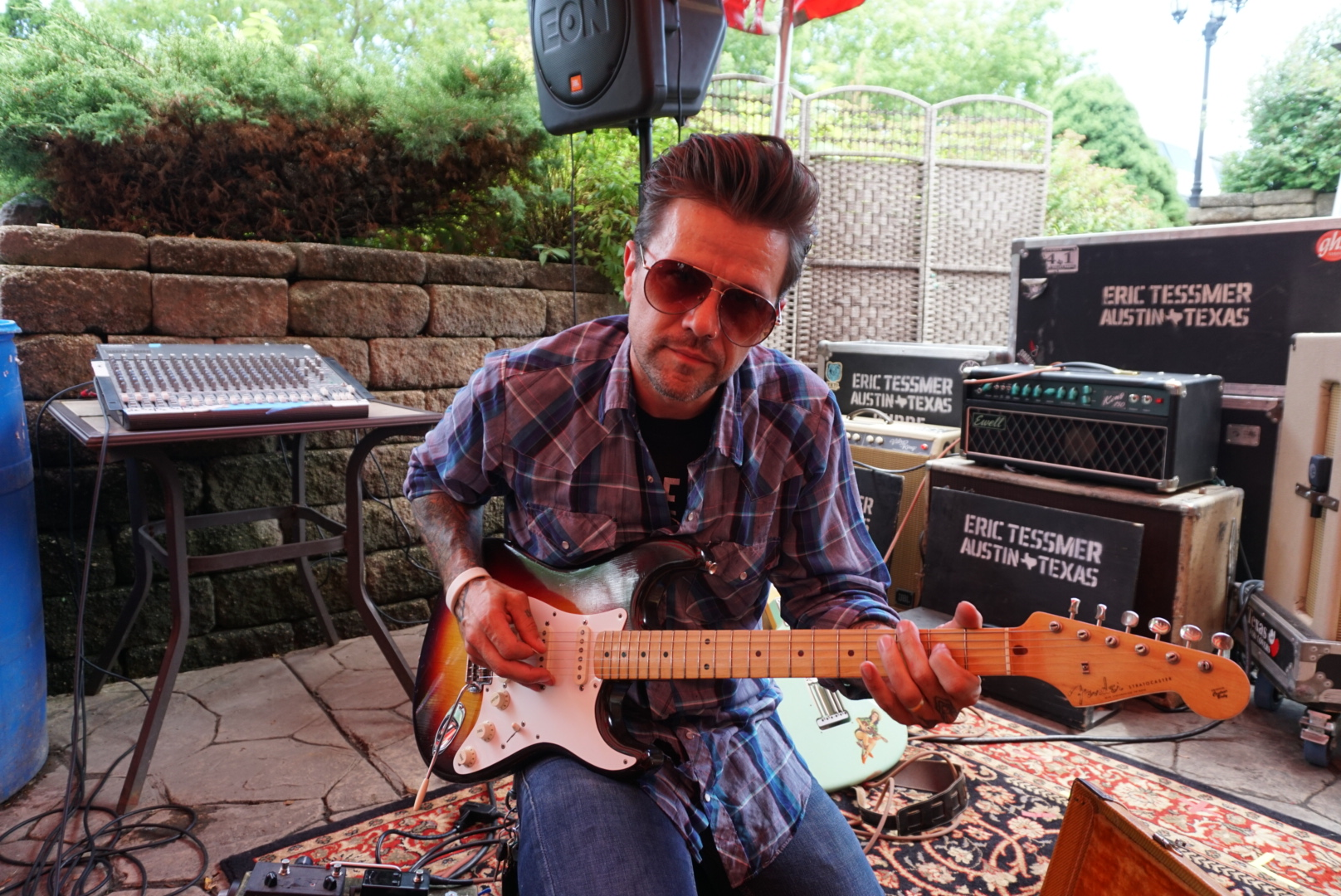
- Eric Tessmer July 2019
- Born: Eric James Tessmer; August 19, 1981 (age 45); Richland Center, Wisconsin
- Musical career
- Genres: Blues; soul; R&B; blues rock
- Occupations: Guitarist, singer-songwriter
- Instruments: Guitar; vocals; drums
- Years active: 1999–present
- Labels: Grooveyard Records; Mascot Label Group; Bear Family Records; Favored Nations
- Website: erictessmer.com

Signature
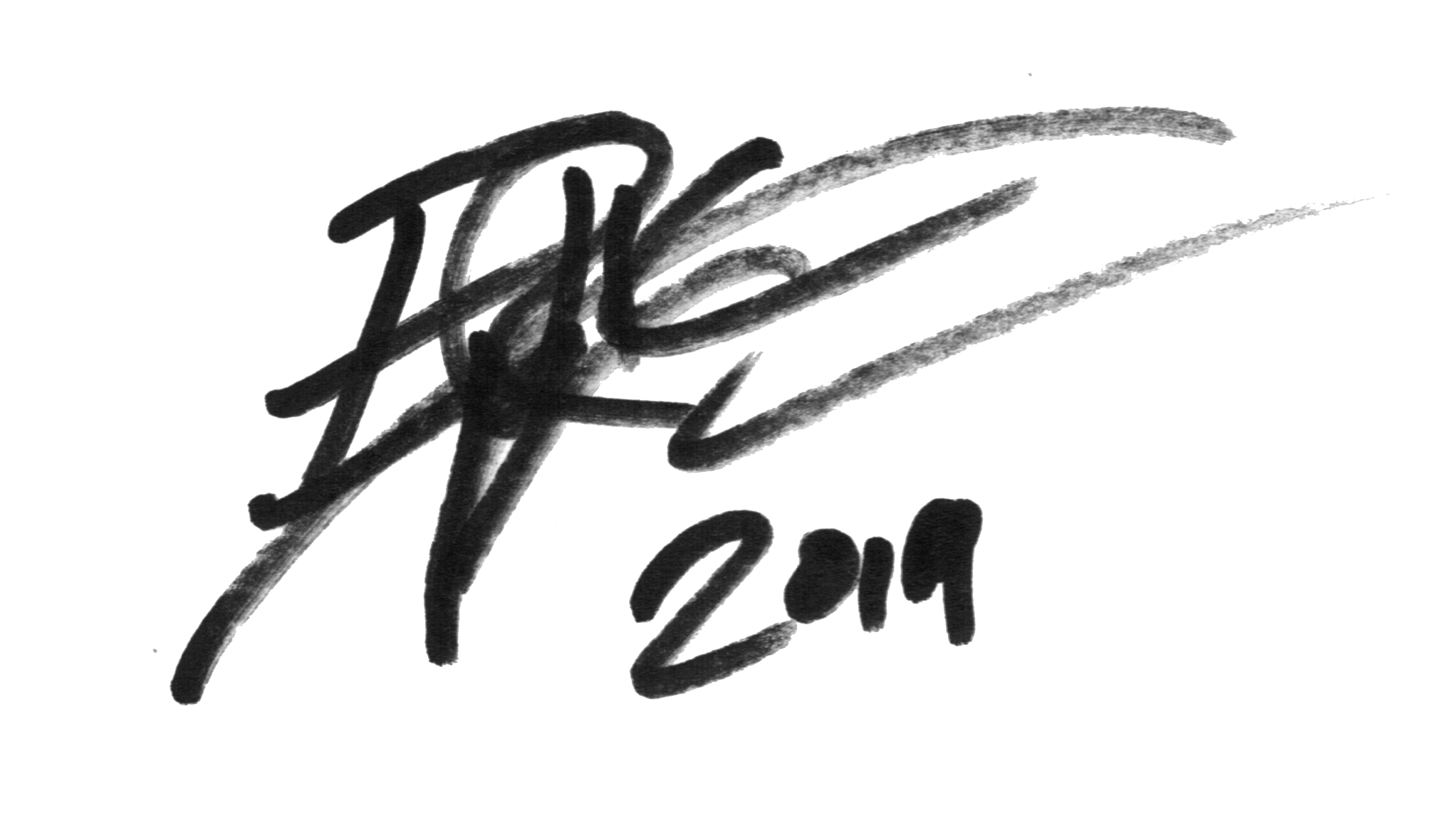

Eric Tessmer (born August 19, 1981) is an American blues guitarist. The Austin Chronicle named Tessmer the best guitarist in the city for 2017–2018, based on their annual poll.

== Early life ==
Tessmer was born on August 19, 1981. His father, a guitar player, named him Eric James Tessmer in honor of Eric Clapton and Jimi Hendrix. Tessmer grew up in Wisconsin, and moved to Austin at age 19 to pursue a career in guitar. He was too young to get into nightclubs and unable to afford an apartment, so he sang in gospel choirs and lived in his rehearsal space.

== Career ==
In 2005, the Eric Tessmer Band released its first EP, Last Night at Joe’s..., but in 2008 the Eric Tessmer band broke up and, despite frequent touring and the release of the album Roots Rock Rhythm in 2010, Tessmer did not achieve wider recognition. In 2015, Tessmer quit drinking and began releasing EPs, some of which contain songs with themes centered on sobriety. In 2018, Tessmer was the top choice in the annual Austin Chronicle poll for the Austin Music Awards, and was named the best guitarist in Austin. In 2019, Tessmer began working with Nancy Wilson from the band Heart.

== Musical style ==
Tessmer's songwriting has been described as being inspired by Stevie Ray Vaughan, to whom he was compared in his early years in Austin. He still receives comparisons to Vaughan because he plays the guitar with a similar "power and finesse". The Fender (company) recently presented him with a surf green copy of the 1959 Fender Stratocaster that he uses as his main guitar. He has also cited David Gilmour, Eric Clapton, Jimi Hendrix, and Gary Clark Jr. as inspirations. HuffPost contributor Ashley Jude Collie has described Tessmer's "soul-chedelic" style as "Tessmer’s own cocktail of R&B, soul and blues rock".

== Recognition ==
- 2017: Black Fret Major grant $18,000
- 2018: Austin Chronicle Austin Music Awards, Best Guitarist

== Musical equipment ==
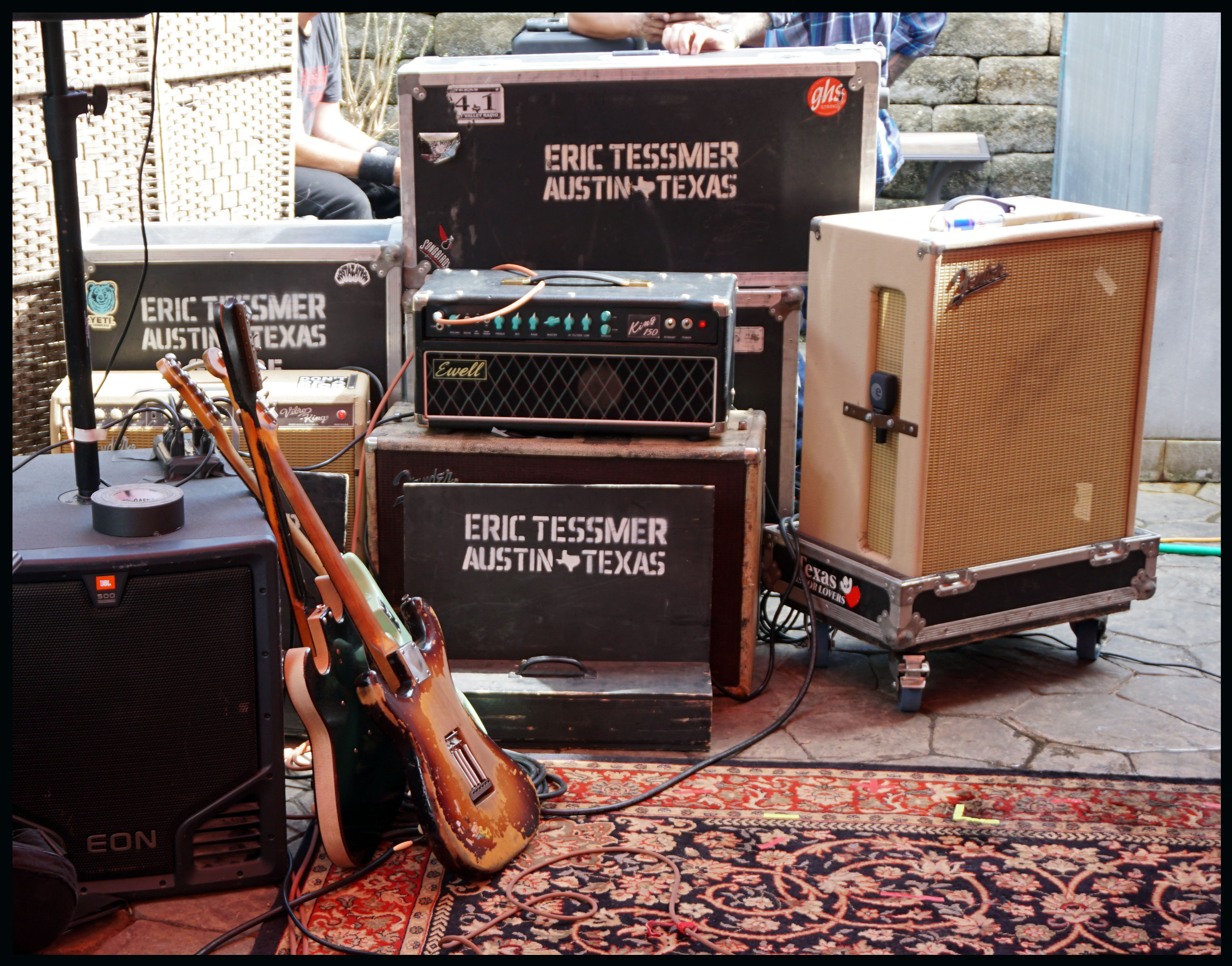
Eric Tessmer's rig 3 guitars and amplifiers

=== Guitars ===
- Vintage 1959 Fender Stratocaster
- 1960's Danelectro Silvertone 1 pickup black and white
- Fender Custom Shop Stratocaster '59 RI Dale Wilson Masterbuilt
  - Surf Green with Matching Headstock

=== Amplifiers ===
- Fender Vibro-King
- 61' Fender 1x15 cab
- Leslie

== Personal life ==
He lives in Austin, Texas.

== Discography ==
- Blues Bullets (2002)
- Last Night at Joe’s... Eric Tessmer Band (2005)
- Green Diamond (2010)
- Eric Tessmer EP1 (2016)
- Eric Tessmer EP2 (2019)

== See also ==
- Austin music
