= Joe Louis Walker =

American singer-songwriter (1949–2025)

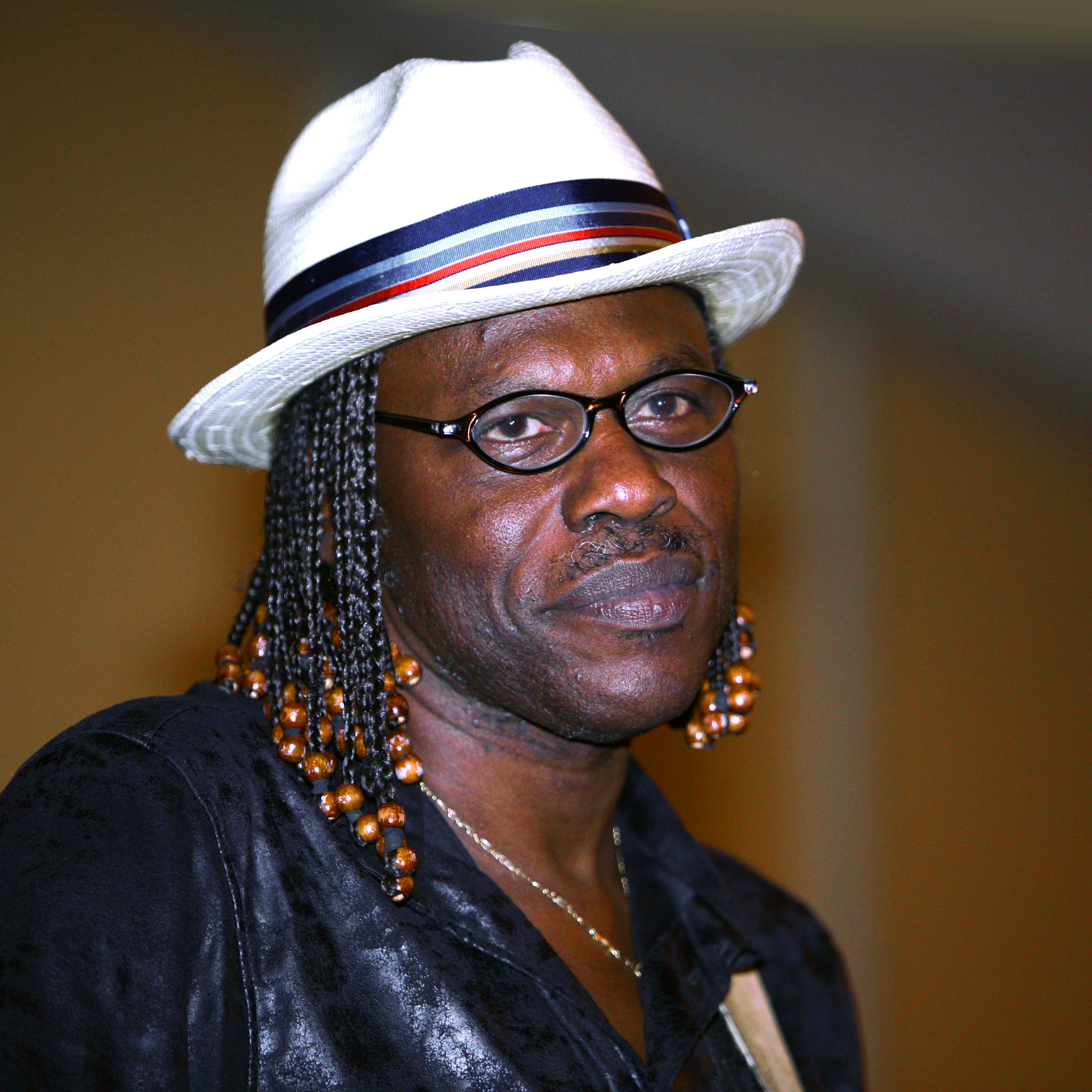
- Walker in 2007

Background information
- Born: Louis Joseph Walker Jr. December 25, 1949; San Francisco, California, U.S.
- Died: April 30, 2025 (aged 75) Poughkeepsie, New York, U.S.
- Genre: Electric blues
- Occupations: Musician; songwriter; record producer
- Instruments: Guitar; vocals
- Years active: 1964–2025
- Labels: Polygram; HighTone; Provogue; Evidence Music; JSP; Stony Plain; Verve; Alligator
- Website: www.joelouiswalker.com

Louis Joseph Walker Jr. (December 25, 1949 – April 30, 2025), known as Joe Louis Walker, was an American musician, best known as an electric blues guitarist, singer, songwriter and producer. His knowledge of blues history is revealed by his use of older material and playing styles.

NPR Music described him as "Powerful, soul-stirring, fierce and gritty...a legendary boundary-pushing icon of modern blues." Another music journalist noted "If you define 'blues' by the rigid categories of structure rather than the flexible language of feeling allusion, Robert Cray... Larry Garner, Joe Louis Walker and James Armstrong are a new and uncategorizable breed, their music blues-like rather than blues, each of them blending ideas and devices from a variety of sources – soul, rock, jazz, gospel – with a sophistication beyond the reach of their forerunners".

== Career ==
Walker was born Louis Joseph Walker Jr. in San Francisco, California, on December 25, 1949. He came from a musical family, amidst the early influences of T-Bone Walker, B.B. King, Meade Lux Lewis, Amos Milburn, and Pete Johnson. Walker first picked up the guitar at the age of eight, and became a known quantity within the Bay Area music scene by the age of 16. While publicly performing through his teens, he soaked up many influences (especially vocalists such as Wilson Pickett, James Brown, Bobby Womack and Otis Redding). In these early years, Walker played with John Lee Hooker, J.J. Malone, Buddy Miles, Otis Rush, Thelonious Monk, The Soul Stirrers, Willie Dixon, Charlie Musselwhite, Steve Miller, Nick Lowe, John Mayall, Earl Hooker, Muddy Waters, and Jimi Hendrix. By 1968, he had forged a friendship with Mike Bloomfield; they were roommates for many years until Bloomfield's untimely death.

This event was the catalyst that placed Walker into a lifestyle change. He left the world of the blues and enrolled himself at San Francisco State University, achieving a degree in Music and English. Throughout this time, Walker was regularly performing with The Spiritual Corinthians Gospel Quartet. After a 1985 performance at the New Orleans Jazz & Heritage Festival, he was inspired to return to his blues roots whereupon he formed the "Bosstalkers" and signed to the HighTone label. Under the auspices of Bruce Bromberg and Dennis Walker, his debut album, Cold Is The Night was released in 1986. He began a worldwide touring schedule, delivering a four more releases in succession for HighTone (The Gift (1988), Blue Soul (1989), Live at Slims Vol. 1 (1991), and Live at Slims Vol. 2 (1992).

After the long partnership with HighTone, Walker was signed by Polygram to their Verve/Gitanes record label. His first of many Polygram releases ensued with Blues Survivor in 1993. This marked the beginning of an eclectic era that merged many of his gospel, jazz, soul, funk and rock influences with his trademark blues sensibilities. 1993 also saw the release of B.B. King's Grammy Award-winning Blues Summit album, which featured a duet with Walker (a Walker original, "Everybody's Had the Blues"). This was followed up by a live DVD release, featuring another duet with Walker (a rendition of "T-Bone Shuffle").

JLW was released in 1994, featuring guests such as James Cotton, Branford Marsalis, and the Tower of Power horn section.

During this period, Walker's touring schedule saw many re-appearances at the world's music festivals (North Sea Jazz, Montreux, Glastonbury, San Francisco, Russian River Jazz, Monterey, New Orleans Jazz & Heritage, Byron Bay, Australia, Notodden, Lucerne, and at the Beacon Theatre in New York City). Walker also spent years covering all the major western television networks (Conan O'Brien, Imus, Jools Holland UK, inauguration for George W. Bush, inducting B.B. King for President Bill Clinton and Hillary Clinton into the Kennedy Center Honors, Ohne Filter Germany, Rock and Roll Hall of Fame) as well as numerous worldwide TV networks.

Blues of the Month Club was released in 1995, and was the first of three Walker albums that were co-produced with Steve Cropper. This was followed up by the release of Great Guitars in 1997. Walker's guest musicians on this release, included Bonnie Raitt, Buddy Guy, Taj Mahal, Clarence "Gatemouth" Brown, Otis Rush, Scotty Moore, Robert Lockwood, Jr., Matt "Guitar" Murphy, Steve Cropper, Tower of Power, and Ike Turner.

Also in 1996, Walker played guitar on James Cotton's, Deep in the Blues, a Grammy Award winner for "Best Traditional Blues Album". In addition, Walker won his third Blues Music Award for Band of the Year (1996) which was preceded by two similar awards for "Contemporary Male Artist of the Year" (1988 and 1991). Walker also won the 1995 Bammy (Bay Area Music Award) for "Blues Musician of the Year". He then released Preacher and the President in 1998 and Silvertone Blues in 1999 (his sixth album for Polygram). This sequence continued with In The Morning (Telarc 2002), Pasa Tiempo (Evidence 2002), Guitar Brothers (JSP 2002), She's My Money Maker (JSP 2003), Ridin' High (Hightone 2003), New Direction (Provogue 2004) and Playin' Dirty (JSP 2006).

In 2002, he featured on the Bo Diddley tribute album, Hey Bo Diddley – A Tribute!, performing the song "Who Do You Love?". He also played While My Guitar Gently Weeps on the Beatles Tribute Album, The Blues White Album.

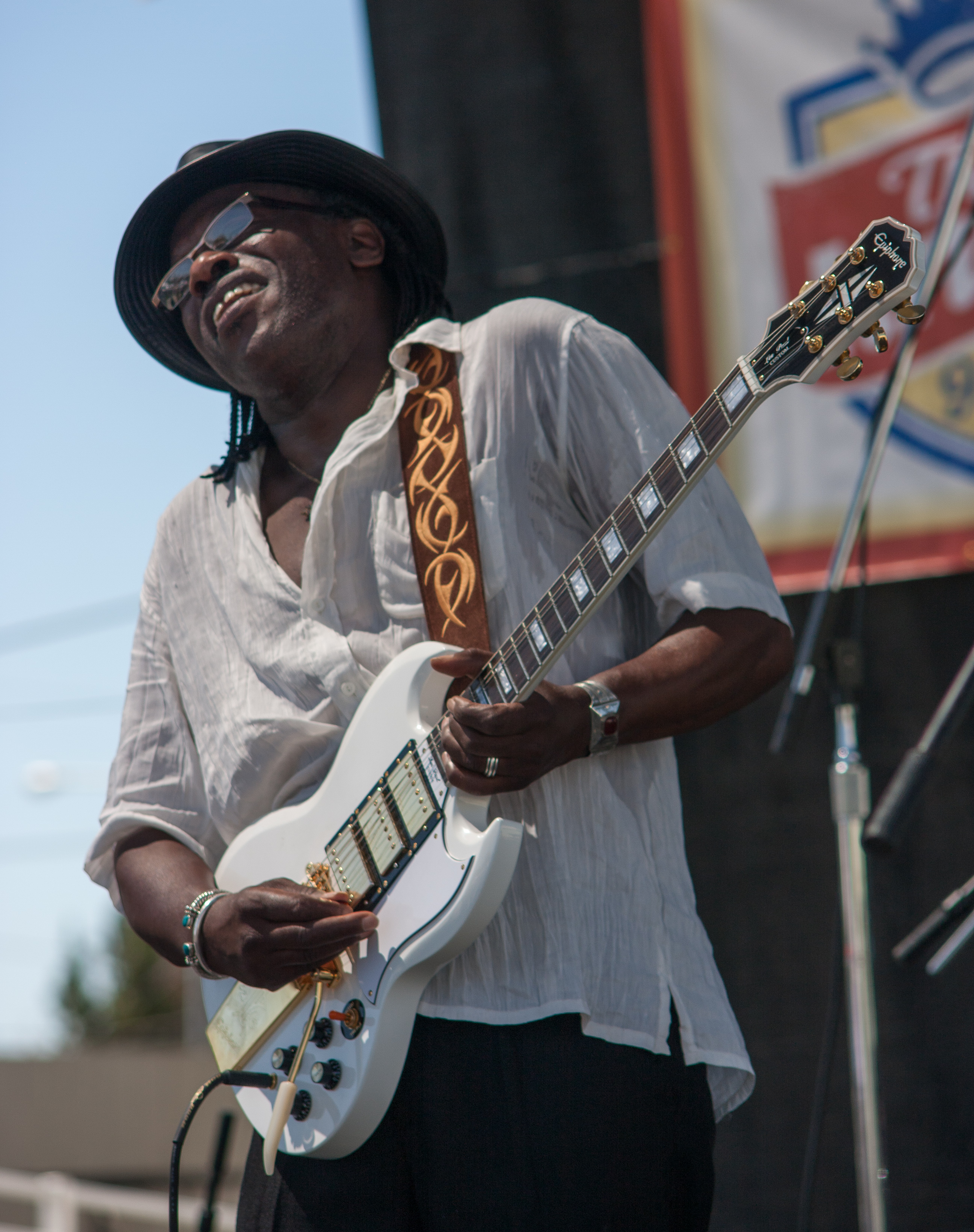
Walker playing guitar at the Petaluma Wine, Jazz, and Blues Festival, August 2009.

In March 2008, Walker signed to Stony Plain Records, and recorded his first album Witness to the Blues for the label in April (produced by Duke Robillard). This album featured guest appearances by Robillard and Todd Sharpville, and was released in September 2008. His second album for the label was released in September 2009 entitled, Between a Rock and the Blues. This album featured Kevin Eubanks as a special guest, best known for his work as the musical director for The Tonight Show with Jay Leno. This album garnered five nominations in the 2010 Blues Music Awards, and it won, "Best CD of the Year Overall".

In 2012, Walker signed with Chicago-based Alligator Records and released Hellfire, produced by Tom Hambridge. Billboard Magazine called it "One of the strongest albums in Walker's canon. Hellfire blows all over the map…gutbucket blues, joyous gospel, Rolling Stones-style rock crunch, and aching R&B. Walker's guitar playing is fine and fierce. Hellfire is a heavenly showcase for Walker's virtues." In 2014, Alligator released Hornet's Nest, also produced by Hambridge. The Chicago Sun-Times said: "Hard rock to gospel, Hornet's Nest is proudly modern, designed to rest comfortably alongside anything from the Black Keys or Jack White. Walker's voice demands attention: scorching, imploring, always commanding, it leads this dynamic album along with his heavy guitar fills that lay the ground work for the horn-peppered soul, Memphis soul, gospel harmony, and a vortex of power chords and funk. He is living proof of the boundless potential of blues."

In 2013, Walker was inducted to the Blues Hall of Fame. In addition that year, Walker was nominated in four categories for a Blues Music Award.

His album Everybody Wants a Piece (2015) was nominated for a Grammy. In an interview with PatchChord News in early December he shared his philosophy about music, saying "Don't be afraid to add other cultures into your sound."

Walker died of a cardiac-related illness in Poughkeepsie, New York, on April 30, 2025, at the age of 75.

== Discography ==
=== Albums ===
- Cold is the Night (HighTone, 1986)
- The Gift (HighTone, 1988)
- Blue Soul (HighTone, 1989)
- Live at Slim's, Volume One (HighTone, 1991)
- Live at Slim's, Volume Two (HighTone, 1992)
- Blues Survivor (Verve/Gitanes/Polygram, 1993)
- JLW (Verve/Gitanes/Polygram, 1994)
- Blues of the Month Club (Verve/Gitanes/Polygram, 1995)
- Great Guitars (Verve/Gitanes/Polygram, 1997)
- Preacher and the President (Verve/Gitanes/Polygram, 1998)
- Silvertone Blues (Blue Thumb/Gitanes/Polygram, 1999)
- Guitar Brothers with Otis Grand (JSP, 2001)
- In the Morning (Telarc, 2002)
- Pasa Tiempo (Evidence, 2002)
- $he's My Money Maker – The Slide Guitar Album (JSP, 2003)
- Ridin' High – Live (HighTone, 2003)
- New Direction (Provogue, 2004)
- Playin' Dirty (JSP, 2006)
- Witness to the Blues (Stony Plain, 2008)
- Between a Rock and the Blues (Stony Plain, 2009)
- Joe Louis Walker's Blues Conspiracy Live on the Legendary Rhythm & Blues Cruise (Dixie Frog, 2010)
- Hellfire (Alligator, 2012)
- Hornet's Nest (Alligator, 2014)
- Everybody Wants a Piece (Provogue, 2015)
- Journeys to the Heart of the Blues with Bruce Katz, Giles Robson (Alligator, 2018)
- Blues Comin' On (Cleopatra, 2020)
- Eclectic Electric (Cleopatra, 2021)
- Weight of the World (Forty Below, 2023)
- Cold is the Night Reimagined (Valley Entertainment, 2025)

=== DVDs ===
- Live at 'On Broadway' (Blues Express, 2001)
- Joe Louis Walker in Concert (inakustik, 2003)
- Viva Las Vegas Live (Cleopatra, 2019) DVD + CD set

=== With James Cotton ===
- Deep in the Blues (also with Charlie Haden) (Verve/Gitanes/Polygram, 1996)

== See also ==
- List of blues musicians
- West Coast blues
- List of guitarists by genre
