= Dick Shurman =

- Born: Richard L. Shurman; May 23, 1950 (age 76); Los Alamos, New Mexico, United States
- Genres: Chicago blues, blues, rhythm and blues
- Occupations: Record producer, sound engineer, music journalist, music historian, backing vocalist
- Labels: Alligator, Delmark, various

Richard L. Shurman (born May 23, 1950) is an American record producer, sound engineer, music journalist, music historian, and backing vocalist.

He has produced numerous recordings by notable musicians including Johnny Winter, Lurrie Bell, Eddie C. Campbell, Albert Collins, Little Smokey Smothers, Jody Williams, Roy Buchanan, Big Bill Morganfield, Larry Garner, Robert Cray, Hip Linkchain, Magic Slim, Charlie Musselwhite, Otis Rush, Johnny Heartsman, and Fenton Robinson. Shurman has also written many liner notes, and is the publisher of Chicago Blues News. In 2005, he was the recipient of the Blues Foundation's "Keeping the Blues Alive" award. He co-produced Showdown!, an album which won a Grammy Award for Best Traditional Blues Album in 1987.

Shurman was inducted into the Blues Hall of Fame in 2014 for his multitudinous contributions as a 'non-performer'.

== Biography ==
Shurman was born in Los Alamos, New Mexico, United States, and later resided in Milwaukee and Madison, Wisconsin, before relocating to Seattle after his father secured employment with Boeing. There he befriended a number of blues musicians, and started writing articles for the British magazine, Blues Unlimited. Shurman first attended the University of Chicago in September 1968. Fearing that his continual attendance at local blues clubs may harm his education, he enrolled at the University of Washington, earning a master's degree in library science that enabled him to begin full-time employment in a suburban library back in Chicago. He continued to work full-time in a succession of library jobs. His occasional writing work led Shurman to interview musicians such as Albert Collins, Otis Rush, Jody Williams, Johnny Heartsman, and Lee "Shot" Williams. Shurman befriended many blues figures including Earl Hooker and Johnny Heartsman.

His involvement in, and passion for Chicago blues, led Shurman into record production work. His most successful period was with Alligator Records, often working alongside the label's founder Bruce Iglauer on production duties. Albert Collins was signed by Alligator Records in 1978, on the recommendation of Shurman, whom Collins had met in Seattle. His first release for the label was Ice Pickin' (1978), which was recorded at Curtom Studios, Chicago, and produced by Iglauer, Shurman and Richard McLeese.

Shurman co-produced the album Showdown!, with Iglauer, which won a Grammy Award for Best Traditional Blues Album in 1987.

Shurman has contributed to various publications, including Living Blues, Juke Blues and Block Magazine. In 1997, Shurman jointly compiled and wrote the liner notes for Sonny Boy Williamson II's compilation album, His Best. In 2000, Shurman gave encouragement to Jody Williams to resume performing, and produced Williams' comeback album, Return of a Legend (2002), on which his bold playing belied his thirty-year break from music.

In 2010, following the death of Little Smokey Smothers, Shurman and Iglauer jointly penned an obituary which appeared in Living Blues.

In 2014, Shurman was inducted as a member of the Blues Hall of Fame.

Shurman has annotated many albums and contributed to chapters of books, feature articles and reviews, and for many years had a news column in Living Blues. He is also a member of the Chicago Blues Festival Advisory Committee. His annotation work included the ten disc box set, Ladies and Gentlemen... Mr. B.B. King (2012). In addition he earlier penned the liner notes for Howlin' Wolf's 1991 compilation, The Chess Box.

== Selected record production and other work ==
Year	Album title	Artist	Other information
1976	Right Place, Wrong Time	Otis Rush	Liner notes
1978	Ice Pickin'	Albert Collins	Co-production with Bruce Iglauer and Richard McLeese
1980	Frostbite	Albert Collins	Co-production with Iglauer and Casey Jones
1983	Don't Lose Your Cool	Albert Collins	Co-production with Iglauer and Collins
1984	Guitar Slinger	Johnny Winter	Co-production with Iglauer and Winter
1985	Serious Business	Johnny Winter	Co-production with Iglauer and Winter
1985	Showdown!	Albert Collins, Robert Cray and Johnny Copeland	Co-production with Iglauer
1985	When a Guitar Plays the Blues	Roy Buchanan	Co-production with Iglauer and Buchanan
1986	Dancing on the Edge	Roy Buchanan	Co-production with Iglauer and Buchanan
1986	Third Degree	Johnny Winter	Co-production with Winter
1987	Hot Wires	Roy Buchanan	Co-production with Justin Niebank, Iglauer and Buchanan
1991	The Touch	Johnny Heartsman	Co-production with Iglauer
1991	Let Me In	Johnny Winter	Co-production with Winter; backing vocalist
1992	Hey, Where's Your Brother?	Johnny Winter	Co-production with Winter
1997	His Best	Sonny Boy Williamson II	Compiler and liner notes with Andy McKaie
1998	Rough News	Charlie Musselwhite	Producer and backing vocalist
1998	Live in NYC '97	Johnny Winter	Producer
1998	Black Tornado	Magic Slim	Producer
2000	Snakebite	Magic Slim	Producer
2000	Once Upon the Blues	Larry Garner	Producer and backing vocalist
2001	Ramblin' Mind	Big Bill Morganfield	Producer
2002	Return of a Legend	Jody Williams	Producer
2004	I'm a Bluesman	Johnny Winter	Co-production with Tom Hambridge and Winter
2009	Chicago Blues Buddies	Little Smokey Smothers	Producer, photography and liner notes
2012	Spider Eating Preacher	Eddie C. Campbell	Producer
2013	Blues in my Soul	Lurrie Bell	Producer and liner notes
