= Serious Business (Johnny Winter album) =

1985 studio album by Johnny Winter

Studio album by Johnny Winter
- Released: 1985
- Recorded: Streeterville Studios, Chicago, Illinois
- Genre: Blues
- Length: 43:52
- Label: Alligator (US), Sonet (UK)
- Producer: Johnny Winter; Bruce Iglauer; Dick Shurman

Johnny Winter chronology
Guitar Slinger (1984)	Serious Business (1985)	Third Degree (1986)

Serious Business is an album by guitarist and singer Johnny Winter. It was released in 1985 on vinyl and CD by Alligator Records.

Serious Business was nominated for a Grammy Award for Best Traditional Blues Album.

== Critical reception ==
Professional ratings
Review scores
Source	Rating
Allmusic	3.5/5 stars
The Penguin Guide to Blues Recordings	3.5/4 stars

On AllMusic, William Ruhlmann said, "Signing to the Chicago-based independent blues label Alligator Records, [Winter] staged his own comeback with 1984's Guitar Slinger, and its follow-up, Serious Business, is in the same vein. That vein is straight Chicago-style electric blues in the manner of Muddy Waters.... He was already developing from his old mile-a-minute playing style into more of an expressive bluesman in the late '70s. Here, the transition is complete.... Maybe Johnny Winter isn't trying to be a superstar anymore, but his striving to be a consummate bluesman is wholly successful."

== Track listing ==
1. "Master Mechanic" (A.D. Prestage, Joe Shamwell, Walter Godbold) – 3:37
2. "Sound the Bell" (Clarence Garlow, Eddie Shuler) – 3:23
3. "Murdering Blues" (Doctor Clayton) – 5:02
4. "It Ain't Your Business" (James Moore) – 3:50
5. "Good Time Woman" (Johnny Winter) – 6:03
6. "Unseen Eye" (Sonny Boy Williamson II) – 4:18
7. "My Time After Awhile" (Bob Geddins) 6:13
8. "Serious as a Heart Attack" (Johnny Winter) – 3:31
9. "Give It Back" (Sonny Thompson) – 3:48
10. "Route 90" (Clarence Garlow, Leon René) – 4:07

== Personnel ==
Musicians

- Johnny Winter – guitar, vocals
- Ken Saydak – piano
- Johnny B. Gayden – bass
- Casey Jones – drums
- Jon Paris – harmonica on "Murdering Blues", "Good Time Woman", "Unseen Eye", "Give It Back"

Production

- Johnny Winter, Bruce Iglauer, Dick Shurman – producers
- Justin Niebank – engineering, mixing
- Fred Breitberg – engineering for "Murdering Blues", "Unseen Eye"
- Chris Garland – design
- Ebet Roberts, Terrence Bert – photography
- Greg Calbi – mastering
- Recorded at Streeterville Studios in Chicago, Illinois and at Red Label Studios in Winnetka, Illinois
