= Ramblin' Mind =

Studio album by Big Bill Morganfield
- Released: 2001
- Genre: Blues
- Label: Blind Pig
- Producer: Dick Shurman

Big Bill Morganfield chronology
Rising Son (1999)	Ramblin' Mind (2001)	Blues in the Blood (2003)

Ramblin' Mind is an album by the American musician Big Bill Morganfield, released in 2001. Morganfield supported the album with a North American tour.

== Production ==
The album was produced by Dick Shurman. Morganfield wrote nine of its songs. He was backed by many of the musicians who had played with his father, Muddy Waters, including pianist Pinetop Perkins and guitarist Bob Margolin. Taj Mahal duetted with Morganfield on "Strong Man Holler" and "You're Gonna Miss Me". Billy Branch contributed on harmonica. "Mellow Chick Swing" is a cover of the Sonny Boy Williamson I song. "People Sure Act Funny" is a version of the song made famous by Arthur Conley.

== Critical reception ==
Professional ratings
Review scores
Source	Rating
AllMusic	4/5 stars
Entertainment Weekly	B
The Penguin Guide to Blues Recordings	3/4 stars
Pittsburgh Post-Gazette	3/4 stars

Entertainment Weekly noted that, "formulaic as it can be, Chicago blues is a powerful force in the right hands." The Chicago Tribune determined that, "where his superb 1999 debut showcased veterans of Waters' Chicago band, Ramblin' Mind broadens the palette with jazz and Mississippi Delta blues." The Independent deemed it "a cracking Chicago blues album." The Gazette said that, "on 'Mellow Chick Swing', an old Sonny Boy Williamson tune, he jumps the blues on top of Mr. B's swinging piano pounding and Bill Lupkin's Williamson-inspired harp playing." The Commercial Appeal opined that Morganfield's "guitar playing is journeyman, his songwriting pedestrian, and his singing frankly weak."

AllMusic wrote that "Morganfield's expressive vocals always hit their mark."

== Track listing ==
No.	Title	Length
1.	"Mellow Chick Swing"
2.	"Strong Man Holler"
3.	"Roll with Me"
4.	"What's the Matter"
5.	"People Sure Act Funny"
6.	"Ramblin' Mind"
7.	"Trace of You"
8.	"Dirty Dealin' Mama"
9.	"Foolish Love"
10.	"My Doggy's Got the Blues"
11.	"Troubles"
12.	"Highway 69"
13.	"Little Angel"
14.	"You're Gonna Miss Me"
