= Let Me In (Johnny Winter album) =

1991 studio album by Johnny Winter

Studio album by Johnny Winter
- Released: June 8, 1991
- Studio: Streeterville (Chicago)
- Genre: Blues
- Length: 49:18 (CD): 45.15 (LP)
- Label: Pointblank
- Producer: Dick Shurman; Johnny Winter

Johnny Winter chronology
The Winter of '88 (1988)	Let Me In (1991)	Hey, Where's Your Brother? (1992)

Let Me In is an album by guitarist and singer Johnny Winter. It was released in 1991 on vinyl and CD by Pointblank Records.

Let Me In was nominated for a Grammy Award for Best Contemporary Blues Album.

== Critical reception ==
Professional ratings
Review scores
Source	Rating
AllMusic	4/5 stars
Chicago Tribune	3/4 stars

On AllMusic, Thom Owens said, "Though the set focuses on blues material, Winters [sic] can never leave his rock roots behind — the sheer volume and pile-driving energy of his performances ensures that."

In the Chicago Tribune, Dan Kening wrote, "The original "White Tornado" returns with a strong outing that both reinforces his reputation as a world-class blues guitarist and indicates a growing maturity.... Winter shows he has at long last learned to balance technical flash with emotional substance."

In the Chicago Reader, David Whiteis wrote, "Johnny Winter's Let Me In is a new contribution from a bluesman well on his way to elder-statesman status.... At this point Winter's guitar is beyond criticism — he's toned down his excesses, but he's still got that machine-gun multinote style, playing straight-ahead blues in manic linear patterns — he doesn't build a solo so much as blast straight through it."

== Track listing ==
1. "Illustrated Man" (Fred James, Mary-Ann Brandon) – 3:37
2. "Barefootin'" (Robert Parker) – 4:06
3. "Life Is Hard" (Fred James) – 6:17
4. "Hey You" (Mike Himelstein) – 2:42
5. "Blue Mood" (Jessie Mae Robinson) – 3:01
6. "Sugaree" (Marty Robbins) – 2:57
7. "Medicine Man" (Robbie Fisher, Henley Douglas) – 4:22
8. "You're Humbuggin' Me" (Rocket Morgan, J.D. Miller) – 2:43
9. "If You Got a Good Woman" (Johnny Winter) – 4:23
10. "Got to Find My Baby" (John Heartsman) – 2:40
11. "Shame Shame Shame" (Jimmy Reed) – 4:16
12. "Let Me In" (Johnny Winter) – 4:11
13. "You Lie Too Much" (Mac Rebennack) – 4:03*
- "You Lie Too Much" was omitted from the vinyl issue.

== Personnel ==
Musicians

- Johnny Winter – electric guitar, acoustic guitar, vocals
- Jeff Ganz – electric bass, fretless bass, upright bass
- Tom Compton – drums
- Dr. John – piano on "Barefootin'", "Life Is Hard", "Sugaree", "You Lie Too Much"
- Ken Saydak – piano on "If You Got a Good Woman"
- Billy Branch – harmonica on "Hey You", "If You Got a Good Woman", "Shame Shame Shame"
- Dennis, Margaret, Johnny and Brian Drugan, Dave Brickson, John Gabrysiak, Dick Shurman – ensemble vocals on "Hey You"

Production

- Dick Shurman, Johnny Winter – producers
- David Axelbaum – engineer
- Dave Brickson – assistant engineer
- Greg Calbi – mastering
- Mark Weiss – photography
- Bill Smith – design
- Recorded and mixed at Streeterville Recording Studios, Chicago
