= Block Magazine =

African-American community publication

- Editor: Rien Wisse
- Categories: Music, blues
- Frequency: Quarterly
- Founded: 1975
- Country: The Netherlands
- Website: Blockmagazine.nl

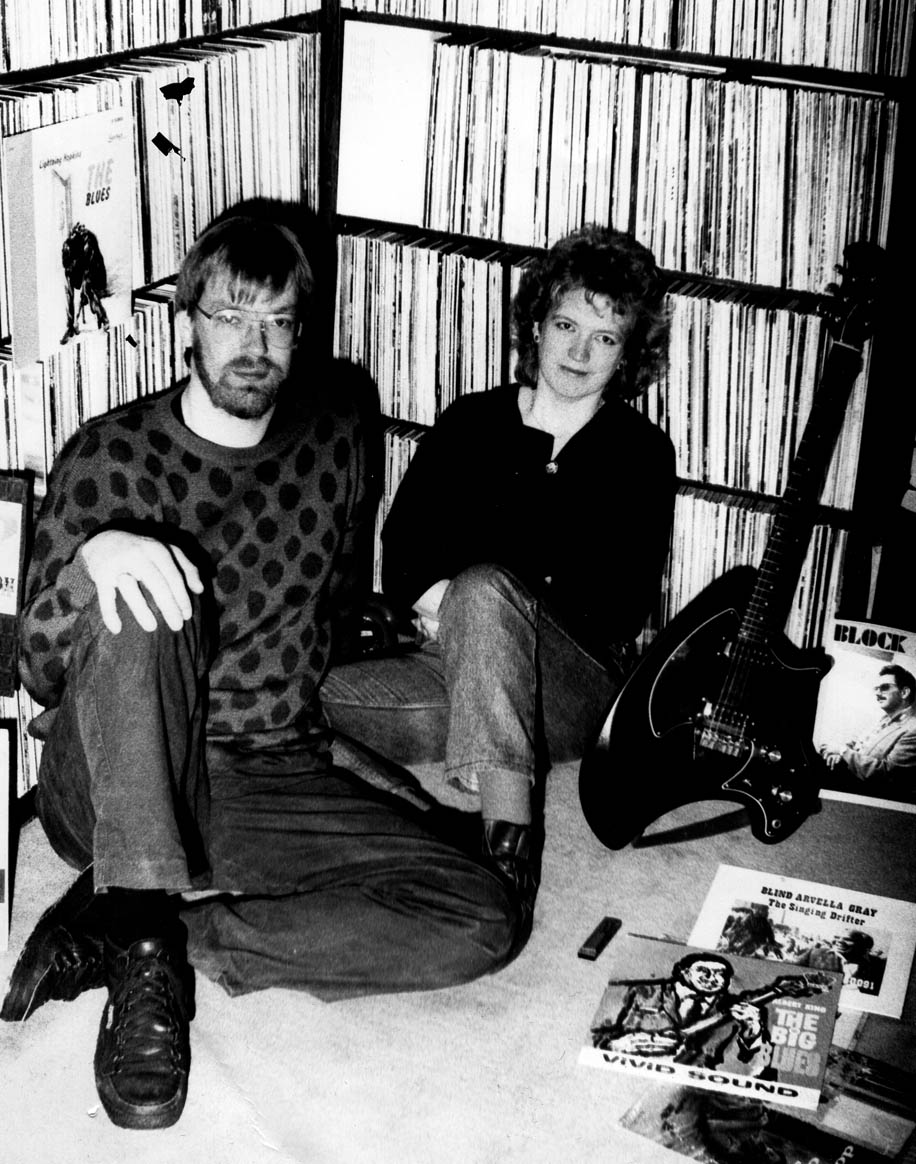
Rien and his wife Marion Wisse (1986)

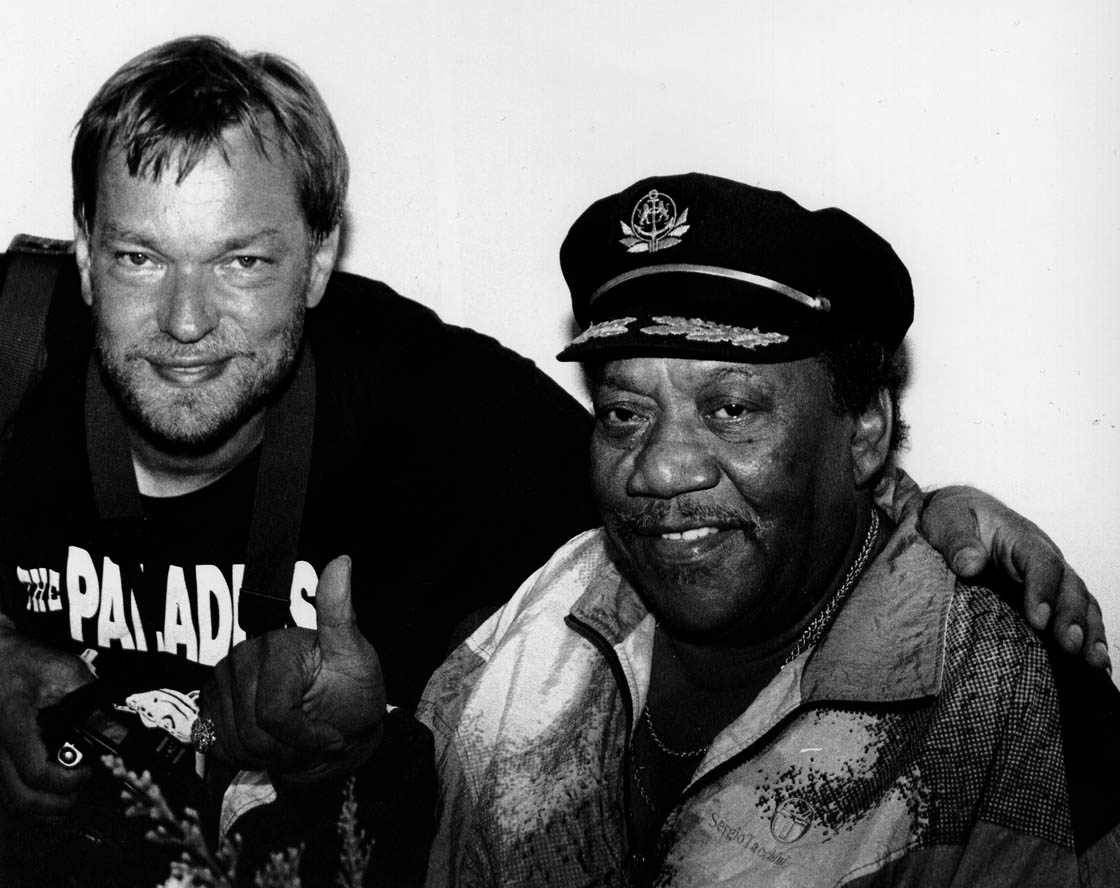
Rien Wisse and Bobby Bland (1994)

BLOCK Magazine is a quarterly magazine about the African-American blues tradition. It is the Netherlands' oldest blues periodical. The magazine was founded in Almelo, in the east of the Netherlands in 1975, by Rien and Marion Wisse. They frequently tour the United States and visit record companies and artists. They have interviewed more than 200 blues artists, including Solomon Burke, Robert Cray, Bo Diddley, Al Green, and Zora Young. Rien and Marion own a collection of approximately 30,000 blues related images.

In 1995, they produced the acoustic CD No Less Than Wireless, containing recordings by Maybe It's The Blues, The Taildraggers, Greyhound and Champagne Charlie.

In January 2010, Block Magazine received the KBA (Keeping the Blues Alive) Award from the Blues Foundation in the category of Print Media.

According to the board of the Blues Foundation: Print Media: Block, Netherlands: "What began as a small fan magazine in 1975 has grown into one of Europe’s finest blues magazines. Block, an amalgam of blues and rock, was first published 35 years ago by Rien Wisse and his wife Marion in the Netherlands. Like most of these efforts, the magazine is mostly financed by their love of the blues and their own money. In 1982, Rien dropped rock coverage and turned Block into THE Dutch blues magazine. The magazine is published four times a year and features articles written by American blues journalists like Bill Dahl, Dick Shurman and Scott Bock. The beautiful photos are part of Block’s 30,000 photo file which dates back to its early days. Finally, its 64 pages concentrate on profiles, reviews of records and performances, and the Wisse’s travels throughout the American blues landscape."
