= Guitar Slinger (Johnny Winter album) =

1984 studio album by Johnny Winter

Studio album by Johnny Winter
- Released: 1984
- Recorded: Red Label Recording Studio, Winnetka, Illinois; Streeterville Recording Studios, Chicago, Illinois
- Genre: Blues
- Length: 39:37
- Label: Alligator
- Producers: Johnny Winter, Bruce Iglauer, Dick Shurman

Johnny Winter chronology
Raisin' Cain (1980)	Guitar Slinger (1984)	Serious Business (1985)

Professional ratings
Review scores
Source	Rating
Allmusic	4/5 stars
The Penguin Guide to Blues Recordings	3.5/4 stars

Guitar Slinger is an album by guitarist and singer Johnny Winter. Released in 1984, it was his first studio album in four years, and his first album for Alligator Records. It was the second consecutive album to feature no original Winter compositions.

Guitar Slinger was nominated for a Grammy Award for Best Traditional Blues Album.

== Track listing ==
1. "It's My Life, Baby" (Don Robey) – 4:08
2. "Don't Take Advantage of Me" (Lee Baker, Jr.) – 5:22
3. "Iodine in My Coffee" (Muddy Waters) – 3:44
4. "Trick Bag" (Earl King) – 3:20
5. "Mad Dog" (Charles Sheffield, Eddie Shuler) – 4:27
6. "Boot Hill" – 3:35
7. "I Smell Trouble" (Don Robey) – 4:50
8. "Lights Out" (Mac Rebennack, Seth David) – 2:33
9. "Kiss Tomorrow Goodbye" (Al Reed) – 3:53
10. "My Soul" (Jamesetta Hawkins) – 3:45

== Personnel ==
Musicians

- Johnny Winter – guitar, vocals
- Ken Saydak – keyboards
- Johnny B. Gayden – bass
- Casey Jones – drums
- Terry Ogolini – tenor saxophone
- Steve Eisen – baritone saxophone
- Don Tenuto – trumpet
- Jim Exum – trombone
- Gene Barge – tenor saxophone on "Lights Out"
- Billy Branch – harmonica on "Iodine in My Coffee"

Production

- Johnny Winter, Bruce Iglauer, Dick Shurman – producers
- Fred Breitberg – recording engineer
- Glenn Odagawa – assistant recording engineer
