= Red Bank Jazz & Blues Festival =

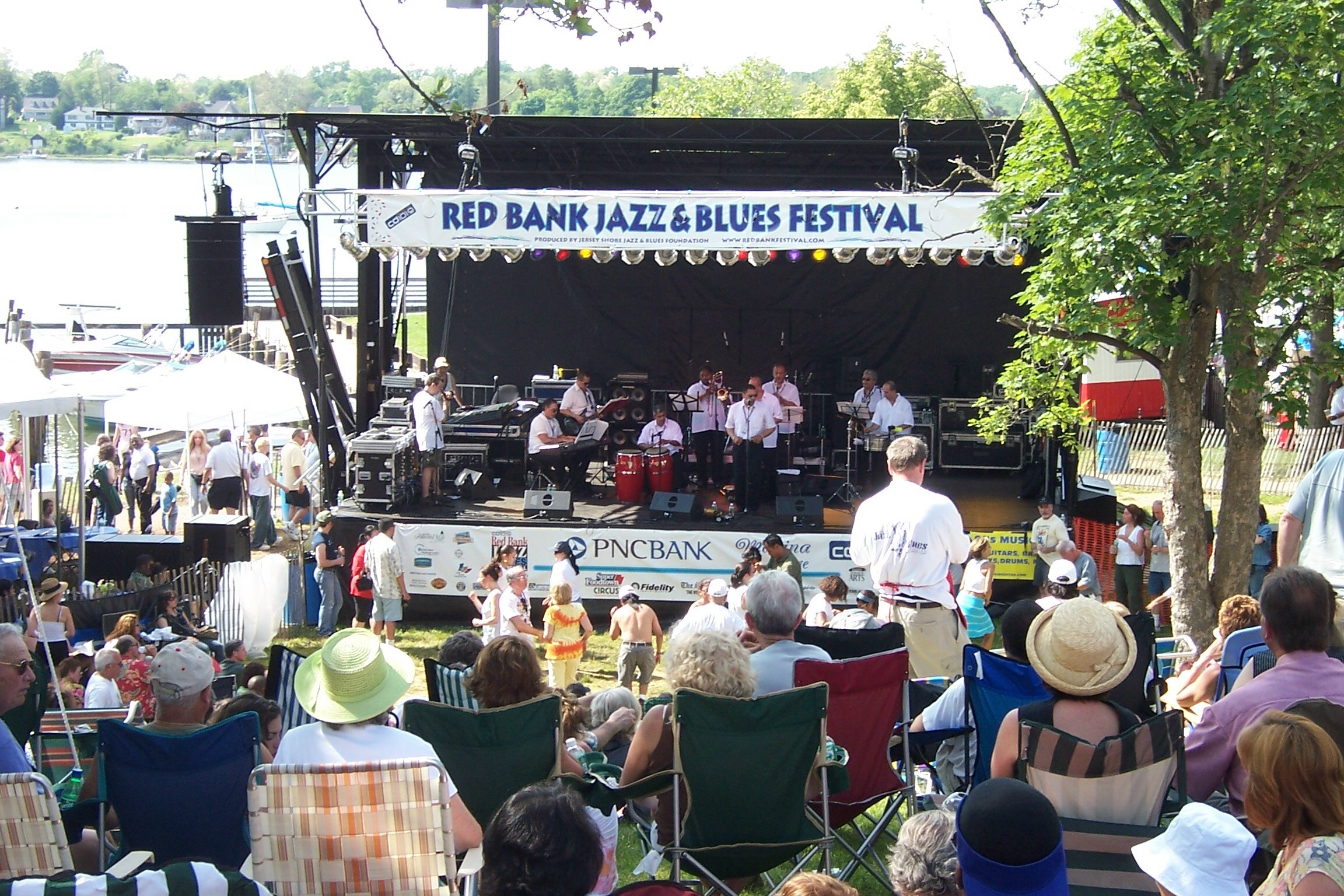
- Ray Rodriguez y Swing Sabroso perform on the Marina Stage, June 2005
- Genre: Blues,
- Location: Red Bank, New Jersey
- Years active: 1987–2016
- Attendance: 80,000–150,000
- Website: Jersey Shore Jazz & Blues Festival 2011

The Red Bank Jazz & Blues Festival, also sometimes known as Red Bank Riverfest, was a music festival that took place the first weekend in June each year in Red Bank, New Jersey. Sited at Marine Park along the Navesink River, the festival was in operation between 1987 and 2016. Organized during some of this time by the non-profit Jersey Shore Jazz & Blues Foundation, the festival typically ran from Friday late afternoon through Sunday late afternoon, and according to varying estimates attracted some 80,000 to 150,000 people over the three days. It was said to be the largest free event of its kind in the Northeast United States.

== History ==
Music was presented on the main Marina Stage as well as the smaller Harbor Experience or Riverfront Stage. Beginning in the late 2000s, a third stage showcased local and youth artists. Numerous vendors of foods and wares surrounded the music area, which was a short stroll from Red Bank's Broad Street center. The event grew out of, and then somewhat co-existed with, the International Food Festival, which had been in operation since around 1980 with the purpose of showcasing the efforts of local restaurants while featuring some music as well.

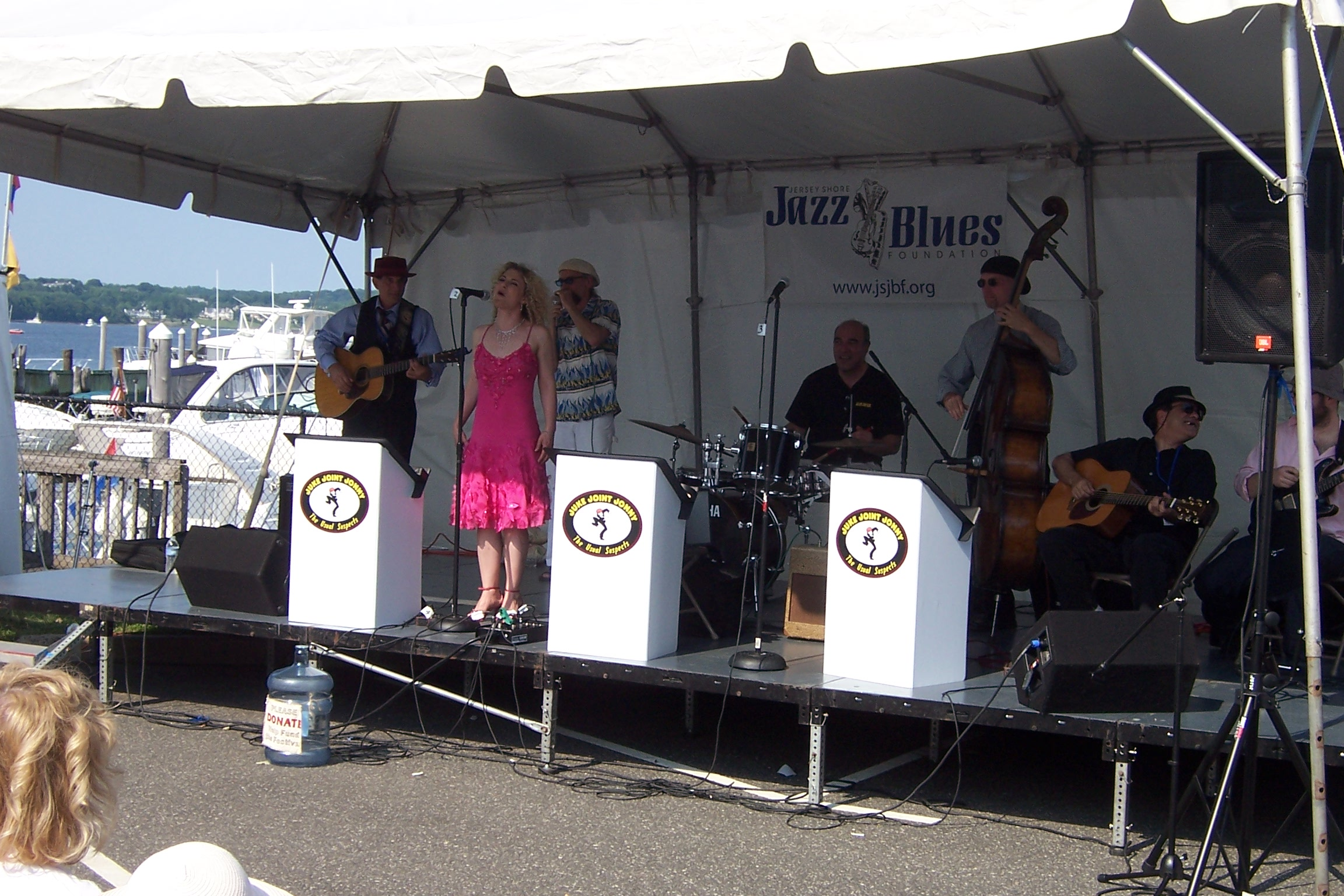
Juke Joint Johnny perform with Chelsea Palermo on the Riverfront Stage, June 2009; marina boats on the Navesink set the scene.

In 2007, the festival was sponsored by Washington Mutual; area smooth jazz radio station CD 101.9 always had a presence as well. In 2008, the festival lacked a title sponsor for the first time since 2003; organizers said the festival's existence was in financial jeopardy for 2009. The festival did go forward in 2009 despite the ongoing late 2000s recession and even further diminished sponsorship, with organizers stressing the need for attendees to contribute and some second stage performers foregoing being paid. Due to construction in Marine Park, the 2010 festival relocated inland to Monmouth Park under the name Jersey Shore Jazz & Blues Festival.

For 2011, the Red Bank Riverfest reclaimed its old spot in the first weekend of June in the park, featuring local, often rock-oriented bands, while the Jersey Shore Jazz & Blues Festival scheduled itself for single days each in Middletown, Long Branch, and Asbury Park across July, August, and September. Relations between the two organizations had been poor for a while, and the two events continued to go their separate ways over the next few years.

As of 2017, however, Riverfest stopped happening, due its organizers said to costs having become prohibitive.

Typical headlining acts for the Festival included John Pizzarelli (2010), Houston Person (2009), Big Bill Morganfield (2007), Eddie Palmieri (2005), Rod Piazza and the Mighty Flyers (2002), and Bernie Worrell and the Woo Warriers (1999).

== See also ==
- List of blues festivals
- List of jazz festivals
