= Big Shoulders =

Big Shoulders was a Chicago-based blues influenced rock and roll band, known for their bawdy renditions of popular folk tunes. They were active in the 1980s and 1990s.

Their two albums were produced by Ken Saydak, the band's singer and keyboardist, and Larry Clyman, the band's guitarist, both former members of Lonnie Brooks's band. Other members were Ron Sorin from Skid City on harmonica, and ex-Vanessa Davis Band founding members Gary Krolak and Greg Bigger on bass and drums respectively.

== Discography ==
- Big Shoulders (Rounder Records, 1989)
- Nickel History (Rounder Records, 1991)
