= Johnny B. Moore =

American Chicago blues musician

- Born: Johnny Belle Moore; January 24, 1950 (age 75); Clarksdale, Mississippi, United States
- Genres: Chicago blues, electric blues
- Occupation(s): Guitarist, singer, songwriter
- Instrument(s): Guitar, vocals Piano, harmonica
- Years active: 1970s–present
- Labels: Various

Johnny B. Moore (born Johnny Belle Moore, January 24, 1950, Clarksdale, Mississippi) is an American Chicago blues and electric blues guitarist, singer and songwriter. He was a member of Koko Taylor's backing band in the mid-1970s. He has recorded nine solo albums since 1987. Moore's music retains a link to the earlier Chicago blues of Jimmy Reed and Muddy Waters, who also travelled to Chicago from the Mississippi Delta.

"If Johnny B. Moore isn't a star in the making," stated Allmusic's Bill Dahl, "there's no justice in the world." The blues historian Gérard Herzhaft commented that "[Moore's] albums reflect a strong Delta flavor that is refreshing in the present blues scene, dominated by rock or funk overtones." However, the blues historian Tony Russell noted in 1997 that Moore "was still one of Chicago's interesting secrets".

== Biography ==
Moore's father, Floyd Moore, a Baptist minister, taught his son to play the guitar from the age of seven. John Lee Hooker's "Boogie Chillen'" was the first piece Moore mastered, but he was influenced by the style of Magic Sam. In his early days Moore performed gospel music in his hometown of Clarksdale and later in Chicago with the Gospel Keys.

In his teen years Moore's mother died. In 1964, the teenage Moore relocated to Chicago with his father, step mother, and 15 siblings. In high school Moore learned to read music, and his education was enhanced by listening to blues records with Letha Jones, the widow of the pianist Little Johnny Jones. By the late 1960s Moore was working in a lamp factory, but after work played music. He was further tutored by Jimmy Reed, whom he first met in his childhood, and then with the Charles Spiers band.

By 1975, Moore found a further musical outlet by joining Koko Taylor's backing band, the Blues Machine, as lead guitarist. He played on Taylor's album The Earthshaker (1978).

He toured separately with Taylor and with Willie Dixon, undertaking European tours with both, and worked in Dixon's band until Dixon died, in 1992. He also augmented his income by appearing more often under his own name. Moore was on the bill at the inaugural Chicago Blues Festival, on June 10, 1984.

His debut album, Hard Times, was released in 1987 on the B.L.U.E.S. label. In the 1990s he recorded six more albums of his own, and started the new millennium with Born in Clarksdale, Mississippi (2001) for the Austrian label Wolf. His Live at Blue Chicago (1996), recorded in the basement of that club, featured Ken Saydak on keyboards. The 1999 live album, Acoustic Blue Chicago, featured Willie Kent, Lester Davenport and Bonnie Lee. Moore often used a bottleneck on his guitar solos.

Moore appeared again at the Chicago Blues Festival in 2002. He has made guest appearances on albums by several other blues musicians, including Willie Kent's Too Hurt to Cry (1994). His album Rockin' in the Same Old Boat (2003) was described by Allmusic journalist Matt Collar: "Moore's hard-driving lead guitar lines are well intact as is his off-hand, sometimes slurred vocal delivery".

== Discography ==
=== Albums ===
Year of release	Album title	Record label
1987	Hard Times	B.L.U.E.S.
1993	Lonesome Blues Chicago Blues Session, Vol. 5	Wolf Records
1996	Johnny B. Moore	Delmark
1996	Live at Blue Chicago (live album)	Delmark
1997	Trouble World	Delmark
1997	911 Blues	Wolf
1999	Acoustic Blue Chicago (live album)	Blue Chicago
2001	Born in Clarksdale, Mississippi	Wolf
2003	Rockin' in the Same Old Boat	Delmark

== See also ==
- List of Chicago blues musicians
- List of electric blues musicians
