= The Winter of '88 =

1988 studio album by Johnny Winter

Studio album by Johnny Winter
- Released: 1988
- Recorded: May–June 1988
- Studio: Ardent Studio/Alpha Sound; Memphis, TN
- Genre: Blues
- Length: 47.26
- Label: MCA
- Producer: Terry Manning

Johnny Winter chronology
Third Degree (1986)	The Winter of '88 (1988)	Let Me In (1991)

Professional ratings
Review scores
Source	Rating
Allmusic	3/5 stars

The Winter of '88 is a 1988 album by Johnny Winter. It was released by MCA Records and it represents Winter's first album with a major after years spent with smaller labels such as Blue Sky Records and Alligator Records. The album contains three compositions by Jerry Lynn Williams who also had several of his songs recorded by Eric Clapton. Winter chose to record the album with his live band at the time, consisting in Jon Paris on bass and harmonica and Tom Compton on drums. He chose, however, to retain Ken Saydak on keyboards from his time with Alligator. Stylistically, the album indicates a return to a more rock-oriented sound.

== Track listing ==
1. "Close to Me" (Jerry Lynn Williams) 4:32
2. "Rain" (Dan Daley) 5:25
3. "Stranger Blues" (Clarence Lewis, Elmore James, Morris Levy) 4:05
4. "Ain't That Just Like a Woman" (Claude Demetrius, Fleecie Moore) 2:53
5. "World of Contradictions" (Johnny Winter) 4:16
6. "Lightning" (Bleu Jackson, Fred James) 5:40
7. "Looking for Trouble" (Tom Larsen) 3:55
8. "Show Me" (Williams) 4:41
9. "Anything for Your Love" (Williams) 4:03
10. "Look Away" (Terry Manning) 5:56
11. "Mother Earth" (CD Bonus Track)
12. "It'll Be Me" (CD Bonus Track)

== Personnel ==
- Johnny Winter - guitar, vocals
- Terry Manning - keyboards, backing vocals
- Lester Snell - keyboards
- Ken Saydak - piano
- Jon Paris - bass guitar, harmonica
- Tom Compton - drums
- William Brown - backing vocals

== Production ==
- Produced, Recorded & Mixed by Terry Manning
- Mastered by Bob Ludwig
