= Skeeter Brandon =

American singer

- Born: Calvin Thomas Brandon; April 22, 1948; Halifax, Virginia, United States
- Died: March 20, 2008 (aged 59) Chapel Hill, North Carolina, United States
- Genres: Blues
- Occupations: Keyboardist, singer, songwriter
- Instruments: Vocals, keyboards
- Years active: 1966–2007
- Labels: New Moon Records, Music Maker, Rock House Records
- Formerly of: Highway 61, Prime Rib Blues Band

Skeeter Brandon (April 22, 1948 – March 20, 2008) was an American blind blues keyboardist, singer and songwriter.

From 1966 to 1991, Brandon played in various bands across the United States. He joined Highway 61 in 1991, and recorded four albums in that ensemble until their break-up in 2001. In 1994 he formed the Prime Rib Blues Band. Popular Skeeter Brandon songs include "Strollie Bun", "That's What Lovin You Has Done To Me", "Soap Opera Blues", and "The Last Goodby". Brandon's lifetime in music reflected the influence of the African-American songster tradition.

== Biography ==
Calvin Thomas Brandon was born the son of Ivory Royster and Mary Brandon, in Halifax, Virginia, United States. One of sixteen children, Brandon was blind since childhood but sang in his local church at the age of six and was playing the piano three years later. He was educated at the Governor Morehead School for the blind in Raleigh, North Carolina, which he first attended in 1954. He learned to play both trumpet and snare drum, and had some success in his teenage years as the leader of his own band playing around in Raleigh and Goldsboro, North Carolina. They specialized in playing cover versions of popular tracks by artists including Sam & Dave, Otis Redding, and Wilson Pickett. He slowly eased the trumpet playing out of his performing repertoire and formed the Soul Stars Band, that were good enough to earn a residency at the Playboy Club in Goldsboro. Brandon concentrated on playing the keyboards and singing for the rest of his life. At the Playboy Club, Brandon was noticed by Clarence Carter who, in 1970, employed Brandon in his backing band. This led to Brandon making appearances worldwide. Brandon and Carter subsequently recorded together at the Muscle Shoals Sound Studio in Alabama.

By 1973, Brandon had joined the backing band for the Chi-Lites. By the middle of that decade, Brandon felt confident and experienced enough to both tour and record under his own name. This led to another recording session at Muscle Shoals Sound Studio. The resulting single, "I Kept on Smilin'" b/w "24 Hour Love Man" was released by Hit Man Records, and sold so well locally that Atlantic Records re-released it in 1975. Brandon then joined William Bell on tour before returning to his home in Goldsboro. He teamed up with another blind musician and played small clubs across North Carolina. Rarely restricted by his loss of vision, Brandon was known for walking through the audience mid-set. In the 1980s, Brandon recorded with a couple of North Carolina gospel ensembles, Slim & the Supreme Angels and Willis Pittman & the Burden Lifters.

in 1991, Brandon was recruited to lead a new outfit, Skeeter Brandon & Highway 61 (often abbreviated to HWY 61). They toured along the East Coast, and released four albums; Rockin' With the Blues, Hi-Test Blues (both 1993), License to Thrill (1996), and I'm a Man of My Word (1999). Guests artists on Hi-Test Blues included Mark Wenner of the Nighthawks, Ann Rabson of Saffire – The Uppity Blues Women, and Bob Margolin. Max Drake played lead guitar on License to Thrill and I'm a Man of My Word. The band split up in 2001, and then the Music Maker Relief Foundation provided assistance to Brandon with his bills and arranged a number of shows for him. Previously in 1994 Brandon had also formed the Prime Rib Blues Band. Brandon's solo effort, It's Good To Go, was released in 2003 on Rock House Records.

On March 20, 2008, Skeeter Brandon died at the age of 59 in Chapel Hill, North Carolina, United States. He had stopped performing in the Charlotte area just four months before his death. Brandon left behind a wife, Vanessa Brandon, and four children.

== Discography ==
Year	Title	Record label	Accreditation
1993	Rockin' With the Blues	New Moon Records	Skeeter Brandon & Highway 61
1993	Hi-Test Blues	New Moon Records	Skeeter Brandon & Highway 61
1996	Licence to Thrill	New Moon Records	Skeeter Brandon & Highway 61
1999	I'm a Man of My Word	New Moon Records	Skeeter Brandon & Highway 61
2003	It's Good To Go	Rock House Records	Skeeter Brandon
