= The Touch (Johnny Heartsman album) =

Studio album by Johnny Heartsman
- Released: 1991
- Genre: Blues
- Label: Alligator
- Producer: Dick Shurman

Johnny Heartsman chronology
Sacramento (1987)	The Touch (1991)	Made in Germany (1995)

The Touch is an album by the American musician Johnny Heartsman, released in 1991. He supported it with a European tour.

== Production ==
Recorded in Sacramento, the album was produced by Dick Shurman. Heartsman wrote the majority of its songs. He played guitar, flute, and organ, and also arranged the songs. "Walkin' Blues" is a version of the Amos Milburn song. Although credited to Heartsman, "Paint My Mailbox Blue", was written by Taj Mahal. Heartsman's guitar solo on "Please Don't Be Scared of My Love" lifts a musical passage from the popular song "Lonely Avenue".

== Critical reception ==
Professional ratings
Review scores
Source	Rating
All Music Guide to the Blues	5/5 stars
Chicago Tribune	3/4 stars
The Grove Press Guide to the Blues on CD	3.5/5 stars
MusicHound Blues: The Essential Album Guide	3/5 stars
North County Times	3.5/4 stars
The Penguin Guide to Blues Recordings	3.5/4 stars
Syracuse Herald American	3/4 stars
The Union	4/5 stars
The Virgin Encyclopedia of the Blues	3/5 stars
The Windsor Star	A

The Chicago Tribune noted that "Heartsman is an exponent of the Bay area style of blues, a style with a jazzier, more 'uptown' sound than Chicago blues." The Windsor Star said that Heartsman's "singing often comes across like Mose Allison with more energy, never forcing emotion on the listener, but providing subtle shadings that are just as effective." The Washington Post opined, "Moving from exuberant jump tunes to breathy flute instrumentals to gritty soul ballads, he's a master of mood, and though his lyrics sometimes fall flat, he nearly always has something colorful and unexpected up his sleeve."

The Montgomery Advertiser called The Touch "an excellent piece of musicianship, but only a mediocre blues album." The Syracuse Herald American concluded that "his songwriting is hit or miss". The Morning Call noted Heartsman's "polished and seductive" vocals and said that the album "reinforces the legend".

== Track listing ==
No.	Title	Length
1.	"Serpent's Touch"
2.	"Paint My Mailbox Blue"
3.	"You're So Fine"
4.	"Tongue"
5.	"Attitude"
6.	"Got to Find My Baby"
7.	"The Butler Did It"
8.	"Please Don't Be Scared of My Love"
9.	"Oops"
10.	"Walkin' Blues"
11.	"Let Me Love You, Baby"
12.	"Heartburn"
13.	"Endless"
14.	"Tongue" (unexpurgated version)
