= I'm a Bluesman =

2004 studio album by Johnny Winter

Studio album by Johnny Winter
- Released: June 15, 2004
- Genre: Blues
- Length: 52:34
- Label: Virgin
- Producer: Johnny Winter, Tom Hambridge, Dick Shurman

Johnny Winter chronology
Live in NYC '97 (1998)	I'm a Bluesman (2004)	Live Bootleg Series Vol. 1 (2007)

I'm a Bluesman is an album by blues guitarist and singer Johnny Winter. This was his first studio album with new material in twelve years, released by Virgin Records on June 25, 2004.

The album is a mixture of original songs and covers of blues standards. As the album's title suggests, the songs have strong emphasis on traditional electric blues over the blues-rock elements on some previous Winter albums.

I'm a Bluesman was nominated for a Grammy Award for Best Contemporary Blues Album.

== Critical reception ==
Professional ratings
Review scores
Source	Rating
Allmusic	3/5 stars

Music website AllMusic gave I'm a Bluesman three out of five stars. Reviewer Richie Unterberger stated that "... it was about exactly the set you'd expect from Winter, setting energetic if predictably formatted material to solid electric blues arrangements..." and pointed out the acoustic song "That Wouldn't Satisfy" as providing the album's more inspired moments.

== Track listing ==
No.	Title	Writer(s)	Length
1.	"I'm a Bluesman"	Scott Spray	4:12
2.	"Cheatin' Blues"	Tom Hambridge	3:22
3.	"I Smell Smoke"	Roger Reale, Jon Tiven, Sally Tiven	3:57
4.	"Lone Wolf"	Tom Hambridge	3:29
5.	"So Much Love"	Jon Paris	3:22
6.	"The Monkey Song"	Ken Howell	6:13
7.	"Shake Down"	Scott Spray	4:02
8.	"Sweet Little Baby"	Johnny Winter	2:48
9.	"Pack Your Bags"	Scott Spray	4:04
10.	"Last Night"	Freddie Scott, Roger Reale	3:12
11.	"That Wouldn't Satisfy"	Hop Wilson	4:08
12.	"Sugar Coated Love"	Jay Miller	4:01
13.	"Let's Start All Over Again"	James Montgomery, Johnny Winter	4:25
14.	"Headed for Hard Times (*)"	Fred James, Mary-Ann Brandon	4:13

(*) Bonus track for Japan edition.

== Personnel ==
=== Musicians ===
- Johnny Winter – vocals, electric guitar, acoustic guitar, slide guitar
- Paul Nelson – rhythm guitar
- Scott Spray – bass
- Wayne June – drums
- James Montgomery – harmonica

=== Guest musicians ===
- Tom Hambridge – drums, percussion, backing vocals
- Mike Welch – rhythm guitar
- Brad Hallen – bass
- Reese Wynans – keyboards
- Tommy MacDonald – bass
- Sal Baglio – rhythm guitar

=== Production ===
- Produced by Tom Hambridge and Dick Shurman.
- Co-Produced by Johnny Winter.
- Recorded by Ducky Carlisle
- Mixed by David Axelbaum and Dick Shurman.
- A&R – David J. Wolter.
- Mastered by Greg Calbi
- CD Design by Kirk Richard Smith Creative Direction Sean Mosher Smith
