= Mel Melton =

American musician & singer

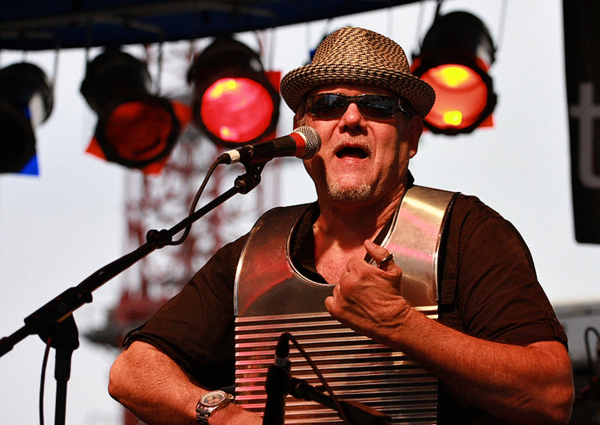

Background information
- Born: Gastonia, North Carolina, U.S.
- Genres: Zydeco, Cajun music Blues
- Instruments: Voice, harmonica, rubboard
- Years active: 1972-present

Mel Melton is an American musician, singer, and chef. Much of his music is in the Zydeco style and his cooking primarily focuses on the culture of southern Louisiana.

== Biography ==
A native of Gastonia, North Carolina, Roy "Mel" Melton first went to Lafayette, Louisiana, to visit a college friend during the summer and play music before returning to the University of North Carolina. He changed his plans when he fell in love with the rich culture and physical beauty of southwest Louisiana. Melton soon moved permanently to Lafayette and began playing in a band he co-founded with slide-guitar player Sonny Landreth.

To help support his musical career, Melton took a series of jobs and eventually discovered a new talent and another part of the Cajun lifestyle: Louisiana cooking. Over the next fifteen years, he honed his musical and cooking skills, eventually becoming a well-known Cajun chef. At the same time, he was becoming known as a singer and a harmonica player who created a Zydeco style of playing that put him in great demand. In addition to playing with Sonny Landreth, Melton was frequently on stage with the King of Zydeco, Clifton Chenier, and spent a year touring with internationally known Zachary Richard.

Melton recorded on Landreth's first record, Blues Attack, which also featured C.J. Chenier on saxophone and Buckwheat Zydeco on the Hammond organ. In 1982, Landreth and Melton formed the band Bayou Rhythm, and eventually added C.J. Chenier to the lineup. The band recorded Way Down in Louisiana in 1985. A song on that record “Congo Square,” was co-written by Landreth and Melton and has since been recorded by The Neville Brothers, John Mayall, Tom Principato and several other artists. Bayou Rhythm toured heavily, headlined national shows and also opened for musicians including Ray Charles, B.B. King, Dr. John, The Neville Brothers, Stevie Ray Vaughan, Dave Edmunds, and The Fabulous Thunderbirds.

One of the special attractions of a Bayou Rhythm concert began at the American Music Festival in 1986, when Melton was challenged to a gumbo cook-off with fellow musician Rockin' Dopsie. The success of the event led Melton to cook more as part of his bands’ gigs.

In 1986, Melton left the band to pursue a full-time chef career in Chicago. In the first month there, as chef at Capers, he won the Grand Prize at the Rolls-Royce/Krug Champagne Invitational Chef Competition. The restaurant was named one of the top ten new Chicago restaurants of 1987. He frequently did cooking demonstrations and appeared on various Chicago radio and television programs. He was also a featured chef at the Chicago Jazz Festival, The American Cancer Society Christmas Gala, and Mardi Gras at the Limelight Club.

In 1990, Melton moved back home to North Carolina, where he continued showcasing his cooking skills at numerous events and cooking schools and by opening several restaurants. In 1995, he formed his current band, Mel Melton & the Wicked Mojos, and in 1998 recorded his first CD, Swampslinger, for New Moon Music, a Chapel Hill-based blues label. The CD was named one of the top ten blues CD of the year by The Washington Post. He followed that up with Mojo Dream in 2000, on the Nashville-based Nightfly label, and it was awarded “Zydeco Record of the Year” by Real Blues Magazine. He also authored his first cookbook, Cookie Boy, the Authentic Cajun Recipes of Mel Melton, published by Kartobi Press of Farmington, New Mexico.

Melton's third album with his band was Papa Mojo’s Roadhouse, featuring guest appearances by Sonny Landreth and Trisha Yearwood's former guitarist, Johnny Garcia, on Louisiana Red Hot Records. The record covers the scale of Louisiana dance hall music, “with rowdy Zydeco and Cajun tunes, swamp bop, juke joint blues and New Orleans funk.” Music journalist Philip Van Vleck (Billboard, Dirty Linen, Metro), said in Triangle Live: “It’s the best record he’s ever released because he just keeps getting better instead of older. His vocal work has never been more forceful, or polished, and his harmonica playing is simply unfailingly brilliant.”

Melton's band features Max Drake on guitar. Melton describes his band's sound and his songs, as “Mojo Music.” “It’s like the food,” he stated. “Down in Louisiana everyone cooks, and they like to stir it up their own way. And when people leave one of our shows I want them to feel like they’ve been down in the swamp at a big party and they’ve had a great time. That’s what it’s all about.”

In 2007, Melton opened Papa Mojo's Roadhouse in Durham, North Carolina. There he focused on how bringing in first-class original musical talent became a stopping-off point for many acts on tour through the southeast. The food at Papa Mojo's Roadhouse was critically acclaimed as being one of the best places for authentic Cajun food outside of Louisiana. In 2008, celebrity television chef Bobby Flay presented Melton with the restaurant's award first place in the casual dining category during the N.C. State Fair. In 2014, Melton closed Papa Mojo's Roadhouse to focus on his music and to continue teaching cooking. He frequently plays in North Carolina and Virginia and several of his 2018 shows featured John Dee Holeman.

== Music discography ==
With Sonny Landreth

- 1981 – Blues Attack

With Bayou Rhythm

- 1985 – Way Down in Louisiana

With Mel Melton and the Wicked Mojos

- 1998 – Swampslinger
- 2000 – Mojo Dreams
- 2003 – Papa Mojo’s Roadhouse

== Culinary career ==
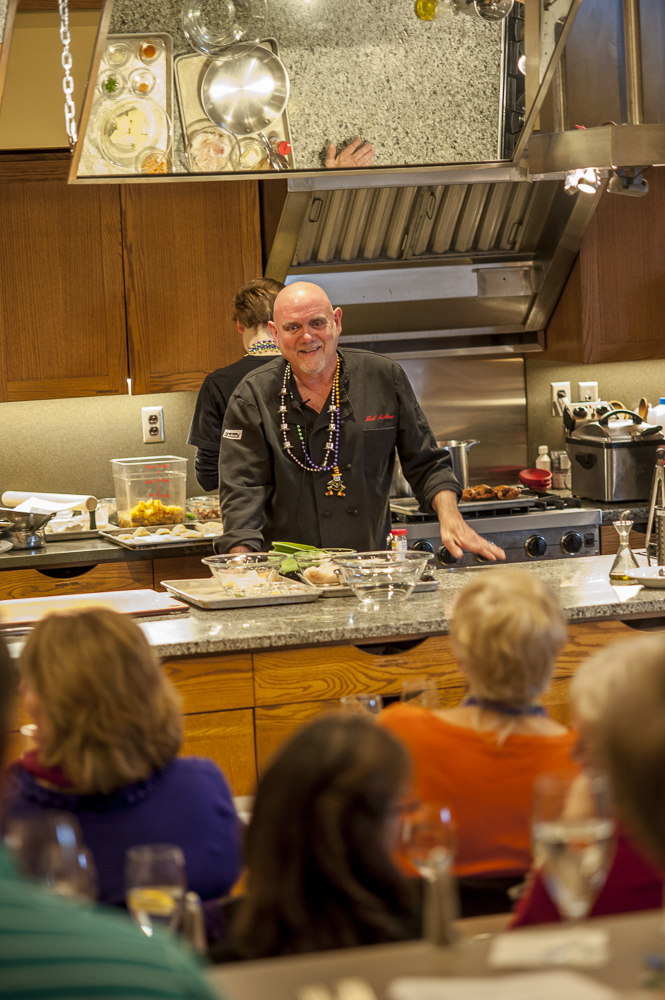
Chef Mel Melton leading a cooking class in 2013

Charter Member of Chefs de Cuisine Acadian, Lafayette, LA, 1983

Grand prize winner, Rolls-Royce / Krug Champagne Invitational Chef Competition, Chicago, IL, June 1986

Named as one of the top ten new restaurants in Chicago, Chicago Tribune & Pioneer Press, Chicago, IL, January, 1987

Certified Senior Executive Chef, Marriott Conference Services, Duke University Fuqua School of Business, Durham, NC, 1991

Grand Prize Winner - Casual Restaurant, Best in the State Award, State of N.C. Agricultural Commission, 2008

Second Place Winner - Casual Restaurant, Best in the State Award, State of N.C. Agricultural Commission, 2009 & 2010

Voted Best Cajun Restaurant in the Triangle - Indy Week, 2009 - 2013

Performed and cooked with Paula Deen at the Durham Performing Arts Center, 2010

Named one the Fifteen Best Cheeseburgers in the U.S. - Wisconsin Cheese Board, 2012

Selected to appear on Deep Fried Masters, episode featuring fair food and “Got to Be NC”, 2013

== Published works ==
- 2000 - Cookie Boy, the Authentic Cajun Recipes of Mel Melton (Kartobi Press)
