= Third Degree (Johnny Winter album) =

1986 studio album by Johnny Winter

Studio album by Johnny Winter
- Released: 1986
- Recorded: Streetville Studios, Chicago, Illinois
- Genre: Blues
- Length: 43:53
- Label: Alligator
- Producers: Johnny Winter and Dick Shurman

Johnny Winter chronology
Serious Business (1985)	Third Degree (1986)	The Winter of '88 (1988)

Professional ratings
Review scores
Source	Rating
AllMusic	3.5/5 stars
The Penguin Guide to Blues Recordings	3/4 stars

Third Degree is a 1986 album by Johnny Winter and the final one of the trilogy he made for Alligator Records. Following disagreements with Alligator's boss Bruce Iglauer during the production of Winter's previous album, Serious Business, the album was produced by Dick Shurman with Iglauer taking on an Executive Producer role.

Next to Winter's previous album, Third Degree presents more variety. Winter chose not to provide original material, focusing instead on blues standards. For three of the tracks, Winter reunited with bassist Tommy Shannon and drummer Uncle Red Turner, who were Winter's backing band on his first three albums in the late 1960s/early 1970s. Another notable guest on the record is Doctor John, who performed on "Love, Life and Money" and "Tin Pan Alley". (Dr. John and Winter had previously performed together on the occasion of an episode of "In Session TV" in 1983.) Winter also included two solo acoustic numbers, "Evil on My Mind" and "Bad Girl Blues", practicing for months with a National Steel Guitar.

== Track listing ==
1. "Mojo Boogie" (J.B. Lenoir) — 4:52
2. "Love, Life and Money" (Willie Dixon, Henry Glover) — 5:20
3. "Evil on My Mind" (Johnny Winter) — 2:17
4. "See See Baby" (Freddie King, Sonny Thompson) — 3:10
5. "Tin Pan Alley" (Jerry Jones) — 5:48
6. "I'm Good" (Bill Collins, Bonnie Lee) — 3:49
7. "Third Degree" (Eddie Boyd, Willie Dixon) — 6:34
8. "Shake Your Moneymaker" (Elmore James) — 2:40
9. "Bad Girl Blues" (William Borum a.k.a. Memphis Willie B. ) — 4:33
10. "Broke and Lonely" (John Jacob Watson a.k.a. Johnny Guitar Watson) — 4:50

== Personnel ==
- Johnny Winter — electric guitar, National steel guitar, vocals
- Ken Saydak — piano
- Doctor John — piano on 2 and 5
- Johnny B. Gayden — bass
- Tommy Shannon — bass on 4, 8 and 10
- Uncle Red Turner — drums on 4, 8 and 10
- Casey Jones — drums
