= Raw Magic =

Studio album by Magic Slim
- Released: 1982
- Recorded: March 1980
- Genre: Blues, Chicago blues
- Label: Alligator

Magic Slim chronology
Doing Fine (1981)	Raw Magic (1982)	Grand Slam (Essential Boogie) (1982)

Raw Magic is an album by the American musician Magic Slim, released in 1982. It contains tracks Slim recorded for the French Isabel label. He supported it with a North American tour. Raw Magic was reissued in 1990.

== Production ==
The album was recorded in March 1980 in France. Slim was backed by the Teardrops, which included Junior Petis on guitar, Nate Applewhite on drums, and Nick Holt on bass. The bass line on the cover of "Mustang Sally" incorporates a sixteenth note not found in the original. "You Can't Lose What You Never Had" is a version of the Muddy Waters song. "Mama, Talk to Your Daughter" was written by J. B. Lenoir.

== Critical reception ==
Professional ratings
Review scores
Source	Rating
All Music Guide to the Blues	3/5 stars
Robert Christgau	B−
The Encyclopedia of Popular Music	3/5 stars
Lincoln Journal Star	5/5 stars
MusicHound Blues: The Essential Album Guide	2.5/5 stars
The Penguin Guide to Blues Recordings	3.5/4 stars
Rolling Stone	3/5 stars

The Boston Globe called the album "a scorching Chicago blues dance party record". The Clarion-Ledger said that the music "invokes memories of the old 'stroll' sound, that '50s rhythm 'n' blues music". The Telegram stated that Slim "rips off the notes and slams out the rhythms in a driving, energetic fashion".

Rolling Stone opined that "those who think the [Chicago blues] style is all formula ought to check out what new tricks Slim has taught it." Robert Christgau wrote that "Slim conscientiously approximates the licks and grooves of his betters without adding a thing." Reviewing the reissue, The Ottawa Citizen praised the "hard-edged, rhythmically tight blues".

== Track listing ==
Side A

1. "You Can't Lose What You Never Had"
2. "Gravel Road"
3. "Ain't Doing Too Bad"
4. "Why Does a Woman Treat a Good Man So Bad"

Side B

1. "Mama, Talk to Your Daughter"
2. "Mustang Sally"
3. "In the Heart of the Blues"
