= His Best (Sonny Boy Williamson II album) =

Greatest hits album by Sonny Boy Williamson II
- Released: May 20, 1997
- Recorded: August 12, 1955 – April 30, 1964
- Studio: Chess Studios Chicago, Illinois
- Genre: Harmonica blues, Chicago blues, country blues
- Label: Chess, MCA
- Producer: Leonard Chess, Phil Chess, Willie Dixon, Andy McKaie
- Compiler: Andy McKaie, Dick Shurman

Sonny Boy Williamson II chronology
Portrait of a Blues Man (1996)	His Best (1997)	Boppin' with Sonny (1997)

His Best is a 1997 greatest hits compilation album by Sonny Boy Williamson II released by Chess and MCA Records in May as a part of The Chess 50th Anniversary Collection, which released many albums titled His Best for musicians such as Bo Diddley, Little Walter, and others.

== Songs ==
The album features all three of Williamson's singles that charted on Billboard's R&B Singles chart; "Don't Start Me Talking" (#3), "Keep It to Yourself" (#14), and "Help Me" (#24). The album also featured "Bring It On Home" (later covered by Led Zeppelin) and "One Way Out" (covered by Allman Brothers Band).

== Track listing ==
All tracks written by Sonny Boy Williamson II, except where noted.

1. "Good Evening Everybody" – 2:36
2. "Don't Start Me Talking" – 2:36
3. "All My Love in Vain" – 2:51
4. "Keep It to Yourself" – 2:50
5. "Fattening Frogs for Snakes" – 2:23
6. "I Don't Know" – 2:28
7. "Cross My Heart" (Williamson, Greg Guidry) – 3:24
8. "Born Blind" – 2:35
9. "Ninety Nine" – 2:40
10. "Your Funeral and My Trial" – 2:33
11. "Keep Your Hands Out of My Pockets" – 2:51
12. "Sad to Be Alone" – 2:59
13. "Checkin' Up on My Baby" – 1:59
14. "Down Child" – 2:37
15. "Nine Below Zero" – 3:30
16. "Bye Bye Bird" (Williamson, Willie Dixon) – 2:35
17. "Help Me" (Williamson, Dixon, Ralph Bass) – 3:11
18. "Bring It On Home" (Dixon) – 2:39
19. "My Younger Days" – 3:24
20. "One Way Out" (Williamson, Elmore James) – 2:46

== Personnel ==
All personnel per Allmusic

Performers

- Sonny Boy Williamson II – lead vocals, harmonica
- Buddy Guy – guitar
- Robert Lockwood, Jr. – guitar
- Matt "Guitar" Murphy – guitar
- Eugene Pierson – guitar
- Jimmy Rogers – guitar
- Luther Tucker – guitar
- Muddy Waters – guitar
- Willie Dixon – double bass
- Jack Meyers – bass
- Milton Rector – bass
- Lafayette Leake – piano
- Otis Spann – piano
- Fred Below – drums
- Al Duncan – drums
- Clifton James – drums
- Jarrett Gibson – saxophone
- Donald Hankins – saxophone

Production

- Leonard Chess – producer, engineer
- Phil Chess – producer, engineer
- Willie Dixon – producer, engineer
- Andy McKaie – producer, compiler
- Dick Shurman – liner notes, compiler
- Erick Labson – remastering
- Bill Inglot – remixing
- John Strother – remixing

Artwork/Design

- Vartan – art director
- Geary Chansley – photo research
- Meire Murakami – design
- Val Wilmer – photography
- Galen Gart – photography
