= Hey, Where's Your Brother? =

1992 studio album by Johnny Winter

Studio album by Johnny Winter
- Released: 1992
- Genres: Blues rock, blues
- Length: 54:41
- Label: Pointblank
- Producers: Johnny Winter, Dick Shurman

Johnny Winter chronology
Let Me In (1991)	Hey, Where's Your Brother? (1992)	Live in NYC '97 (1998)

Hey, Where's Your Brother? is an album by the American musician Johnny Winter. It was released in 1992 by Pointblank Records. Edgar Winter played on three of the album's songs. The brothers supported the album by jointly playing several shows. The first single was "Johnny Guitar".

== Production ==
Recorded in Chicago, the album was produced in part by Dick Shurman. Winter used few guitar overdubs; he decided to add his brother after deciding that his standard trio sound needed a boost.

== Critical reception ==
Professional ratings
Review scores
Source	Rating
AllMusic	3/5 stars
Calgary Herald	A
Chicago Tribune	3/4 stars
The Gazette	C
The Indianapolis Star	2/4 stars

The Calgary Herald wrote that "Johnny and Edgar ... leave no doubt that this is the way blues is supposed to be played—with all the dirt and dust everyday existence cakes on your soul cleansed by purifying blues chords that caress the spirit and take it to a better place." The Indianapolis Star deemed "You Must Have a Twin" "a reheated version of 'Maybelline' [that] works because Winter injects the right amount of indignity in his voice." The Lexington Herald-Leader noted that the songs "run the gamut from slow grinds to sambas, but each song is propelled by a spirited vocal, an inventive rhythm section and a blazing guitar solo by Winter."

== Track listing ==
1. "Johnny Guitar" (Johnny "Guitar" Watson) — 3:26
2. "She Likes to Boogie Real Low" (Frankie Lee Sims) — 3:14
3. "White Line Blues" (Johnny Winter) — 4:44
4. "Please Come Home for Christmas" (Charles Brown, Gene Redd) — 4:36
5. "Hard Way" (Ellas McDaniel, Grover McDaniel, T-Bone Walker) — 3:58
6. "You Must Have a Twin" (Winter) — 2:44
7. "You Keep Sayin' That You're Leaving" (Winter) — 5:22
8. "Treat Me Like You Wanta" (Winter) — 3:43
9. "Sick and Tired" (Dave Bartholomew, Fats Domino, Chris Kenner) — 3:37
10. "Blues This Bad" (Jon Paris) — 3:36
11. "No More Doggin'" (Rosco Gordon, John Lee Hooker, Jules Taub) — 3:33
12. "Check Out Her Mama'" (Fred James) — 4:01
13. "I Got My Brand on You'" (Willie Dixon) — 5:27
14. "One Step Forward (Two Steps Back)" (Paris) — 2:28

== Personnel ==
Musicians

- Johnny Winter – electric and acoustic guitars, vocals
- Jeff Ganz – electric bass, upright bass, fretless bass, electric guitar
- Tom Compton – drums, percussion
- Edgar Winter – organ (tracks 4 and 7), alto sax (track 4), baritone and tenor saxes (track 9), vocals (track 4)
- Billy Branch – harmonica (tracks 6, 8, 13, 14)

Production

- Produced by Dick Shurman and Johnny Winter
- Engineering, mixing – David Axelbaum
- Engineering assistance – David Brickson, Jim Godfrey, Mike Siebold
- Mastering – Greg Calbi
- Photography – William Claxton
