= Vartan (art director) =

Vartan Kurjian, better known as Vartan, is a Grammy-winning art director and designer, primarily for MCA Records and Universal Music Group. As of 2014, he had worked on over 600 albums.

Vartan began his career in Japan, working as a graphic artist. In 1979, he joined the art department at MCA Records, becoming a senior art director in 1991. Vartan won a Grammy Award for Best Recording Package at the 34th Annual Grammy Awards, in 1992, for Billie Holiday - The Complete Decca Recordings performed by Billie Holiday. In 1994, Vartan was promoted to VP of creative packaging.

== Noted albums worked on ==
- When the Eagle Flies (Traffic, 1974)
- Frampton (Peter Frampton, 1975)
- I'm in You (Peter Frampton, 1977)
- Zenyatta Mondatta (The Police, 1980)
- At Newport 1960 (Muddy Water, 1987 reissue)
- His Best (Sonny Boy Williamson II, 1997)
- The Harder They Come (soundtrack, 2003 reissue)
- Innervisions (Stevie Wonder, 2000 reissue)
