= Live in NYC '97 =

Live album by Johnny Winter
- Released: March 10, 1998
- Genre: Blues
- Length: 57:54
- Label: Virgin
- Producer: Dick Shurman

Johnny Winter chronology
Hey, Where's Your Brother? (1992)	Live in NYC '97 (1998)	I'm a Bluesman (2004)

Professional ratings
Review scores
Source	Rating
AllMusic	4/5 stars
The Penguin Guide to Blues Recordings	3/4 stars

Live in NYC '97 is a live album by blues musician Johnny Winter, recorded at The Bottom Line in Manhattan. Additional recording took place at Studio 900, New York City.

== Track listing ==
1. "Hide Away" (Freddie King, Sonny Thompson) - 7:28
2. Medley - 6:53
  - "Sen-Sa-Shun"
  - "Got My Mojo Working" (Freddie King, Sonny Thompson, Preston Foster)
3. "She Likes to Boogie Real Low" (Frankie L. Sims, Joe Corona) - 6:39
4. "Blackjack" (Ray Charles) - 8:21
5. "Just a Little Bit" (John Thornton, Piney Brown, Ralph Bass, Earl Washington) - 5:10
6. "The Sun Is Shining" (Jimmy Reed, Calvin Carter, Ewart Abner) - 6:14
7. "The Sky Is Crying" (Elmore James) - 7:19
8. "Johnny Guitar" (Johnny "Guitar" Watson, Johnny Winter) - 4:32
9. "Drop the Bomb" (Snooks Eaglin) - 5:18

== Personnel ==
- Johnny Winter: guitar and vocals
- Mark Epstein: bass and background vocals
- Tom Compton: drums

Bottom Line recording staff

- Chris Andersen: engineer
- Wes Naprstek: assistant engineer
- George Fishler: assistant engineer

Studio 900 recording staff

- Joe Johnson: engineer
- Paul Clements: assistant engineer

Miscellaneous staff

- Dick Shurman: producer
- Mixed by David Axelbaum, at Streeterville, Chicago
