= Black Tornado (album) =

Studio album by Magic Slim & the Teardrops
- Released: 1998
- Studio: Hot Ham & Cheese
- Genre: Blues, Chicago blues
- Label: Blind Pig
- Producer: Dick Shurman

Magic Slim & the Teardrops chronology
See What You're Doin' to Me (1998)	Black Tornado (1998)	Snakebite (2000)

Black Tornado is an album by the American musician Magic Slim, released in 1998. He was backed by his band, the Teardrops. Magic Slim supported the album with a North American tour. The album title is a reference to his nickname. Black Tornado won a AFIM Indie Award for electric blues album of the year.

== Production ==
Recorded at Hot Ham & Cheese, in Chicago, the album was produced by Dick Shurman. Shurman urged Magic Slim to choose songs that he had not before recorded. "Still a Fool" is a cover of the Muddy Waters song. Magic Slim's son Shawn Holt made his recording debut on "Young Man's Blues", contributing guitar and vocals. The title track is an instrumental.

== Critical reception ==
Professional ratings
Review scores
Source	Rating
AllMusic	4/5 stars
Dayton Daily News	B
Los Angeles Times	A
The Penguin Guide to Blues Recordings	4/4 stars
The Tampa Tribune	2.5/4 stars

The St. Petersburg Times called the tracks "studies in wrenching guitar jams." The Dayton Daily News labeled the album "elegant in its simplicity... No one instrument dominates on any track." The Chicago Tribune wrote that "Magic Boogie" "treads the line separating John Lee Hooker and ZZ Top." The Los Angeles Times deemed Black Tornado "sweaty, rockin', roadhouse blues by a master of the craft." The San Diego Union-Tribune praised the "passionate, full-force style of Chicago blues that doesn't concern itself with dressing up." The Boston Herald included Black Tornado on its list of the best albums of 1998.

AllMusic noted that "the original material is up to the 50-percent mark, making this their most adventuresome outing to date."

== Track listing ==
No.	Title	Length
1.	"Jealous Man"
2.	"Wake Me Up Early"
3.	"Still a Fool"
4.	"Black Tornado"
5.	"Playin' with My Mind"
6.	"I Can't Trust My Woman"
7.	"Magic Boogie"
8.	"You've Got Bad Intentions"
9.	"Crazy Woman"
10.	"Young Man's Blues"
11.	"It's Alright"
12.	"Love Like I Wanna"
