= Max Drake =

American blues guitarist (born 1952)

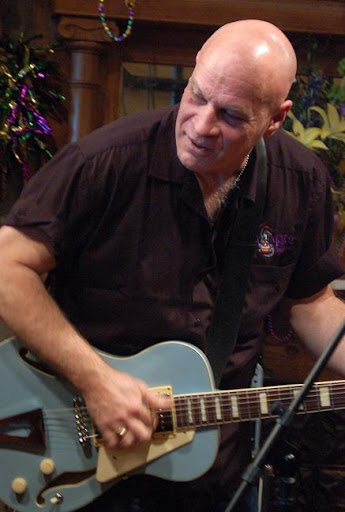
- Drake performing in 2012

Background information
- Born: June 1, 1952 (age 73); Burlington, North Carolina, United States
- Genres: Blues, Piedmont blues
- Occupations: Musician, songwriter, teacher
- Instruments: Guitar, mandolin
- Years active: 1975–present

Max Voorhees Drake II (born June 1, 1952) is an American blues guitarist and songwriter from Yanceyville, North Carolina. He has performed with musicians such as B.B. King, Bo Diddley, Chuck Berry, Lightnin' Hopkins, and Nappy Brown.

== Biography ==
=== Early life and career ===
Max Drake was born in Burlington, North Carolina and grew up in Reidsville. He started his first band at age 23 in 1975. From the mid-1970s until 1989 he gained distinction as a guitarist in Arhooly R&B Deluxe Band. While in Arhooly, there were performances with prominent bluesmen including B.B. King, Bo Diddley, and Robert Cray. Drake became especially known for his agility on slide guitar.

In the 1990s, Drake performed with the Charlotte-based Extraordinaires and also Thomas "Mookie" Brill before recording and performing frequently with Skeeter Brandon. In the 2000s, he played rhythm guitar in Big Bill Morganfield's band, going on worldwide tours. Morganfield is the son of Muddy Waters (aka McKinley Morganfield) often cited as the "father of modern Chicago blues."

As the band toured Europe, blues enthusiasts became increasingly interested in Morganfield. Many were familiar with his father's seminal contributions to electric blues from his work on Chess Records. It was said that the band's version of Waters' "Got My Mojo Working" stood up to the original. Tours in Spain that Drake accompanied him on particularly enjoyed popularity due to the legacy connection to Waters.

After the multiyear run with Morganfield ended, Drake stayed closer to his home and family in Caswell County, North Carolina. He went on to work extensively with Mel Melton & The Wicked Mojos in the 2010s while teaching aspiring blues artists.

Drake has performed at public schools in North Carolina in partnership with the Greensboro-based Piedmont Blues Preservation Society.

== Discography ==
- Got it Bad (1995)
- New Moon Blues on Rise (1996)
- Global Voices: Traditional, Sacred & Contemporary Vocal Music (1998)
- Contemporary Global Voices (2000)
- Popskull & High Art (2008)
