= Johnny Heartsman =

American blues musician

- Heartsman in 1991

Background information
- Also known as: John Leroy Heartsman
- Born: Johnnie Eastman Jr. February 9, 1936; Houston, Texas, United States
- Origin: San Fernando, California, U.S.
- Died: December 27, 1996 (aged 60) Sacramento, California, United States
- Genres: Electric blues, soul blues
- Occupations: Singer, songwriter, musician, arranger
- Instruments: Vocals, bass guitar, flute, keyboards, guitar
- Years active: 1953–1996
- Label: Alligator Records

John Leroy "Johnny" Heartsman (February 9, 1936 – December 27, 1996) was an American electric blues and soul blues musician and songwriter. He showed musical diversity, playing a number of musical instruments, including the electronic organ and flute. He contributed his distinctive guitar playing to a number of recordings made in the San Francisco Bay Area in the 1950s and 1960s. He continued playing until his death.

His best-known recording, "Johnny's House Party", was an R&B hit in 1957. Other notable tracks recorded by Heartsman are "Paint My Mailbox Blue" and "Heartburn". He variously worked with Jimmy McCracklin, Sugar Pie DeSanto, Big Mama Thornton, Ray Agee, Jimmy Wilson, Johnny Fuller, Al King, Tiny Powell and Joe Simon.

== Biography ==
Heartsman was born Johnnie Eastman Jr. in Houston, Texas, and moved at an early age to San Fernando, California. He was initially influenced by Lafayette Thomas. In his teenage years, Heartsman started working as a session musician, in the studio with a local record producer, Bob Geddins. One of his earliest involvements was playing the bass guitar for the 1953 recording of "Tin Pan Alley", by Jimmy Wilson. His own efforts yielded the instrumental track "Johnny's House Party (Parts 1 & 2)", released by the Music City label, which reached number 13 on the U.S. Billboard R&B chart in June 1957. The record billed the act as John Heartsman, the Rhythm Rocker and the Gaylarks.

His continued working as a session musician into the early 1960s. He played on Tiny Powell's "My Time After Awhile" and Al King's cover version of "Reconsider Baby". Heartman's guitar-playing technique involved imaginative use of the guitar's volume control, producing "an eerie moan". His later work included playing in show bands, performing in cocktail lounges, and playing as the touring organist for Joe Simon. He spent 1970–1973 in Midland, Texas, as the leader of the house band at the Chateau Club. It was here that he hired the young blues guitarist and singer-songwriter Jay Boy Adams. Adams credits Heartsman as one of his musical mentors.

By the late 1980s, Heartsman had reverted to playing the blues. His debut album, Sacramento, was released in 1987. It was described by one reviewer as "a great success". He had previously appeared at the San Francisco Blues Festival in 1985. The record producer Dick Shurman oversaw the recording of Heartsman's album The Touch, released by Alligator Records in 1991.

Over the years, Heartsman wrote songs for Jesse James ("Are You Gonna Leave Me"), Roy Buchanan ("Goose Grease"), John Hammond, Jr. (Got to Find My Baby"), Amos Garrett ("Move On Down the Line"), and several more for Joe Simon.

He continued his music career until he died of a stroke in Sacramento, California, in December 1996, at the age of 60.

== Discography ==
Year	Title	Record label
1984	Music of my Heart	Cat 'n Hat Records CNH-1001
1987	Sacramento	CrossCut
1991	The Touch	Alligator
1995	Made in Germany (live album)	In-Akustik
2000	Still Shinin'	Have Mercy

== See also ==
- List of West Coast blues musicians
