= Magic Slim =

American blues singer and guitarist

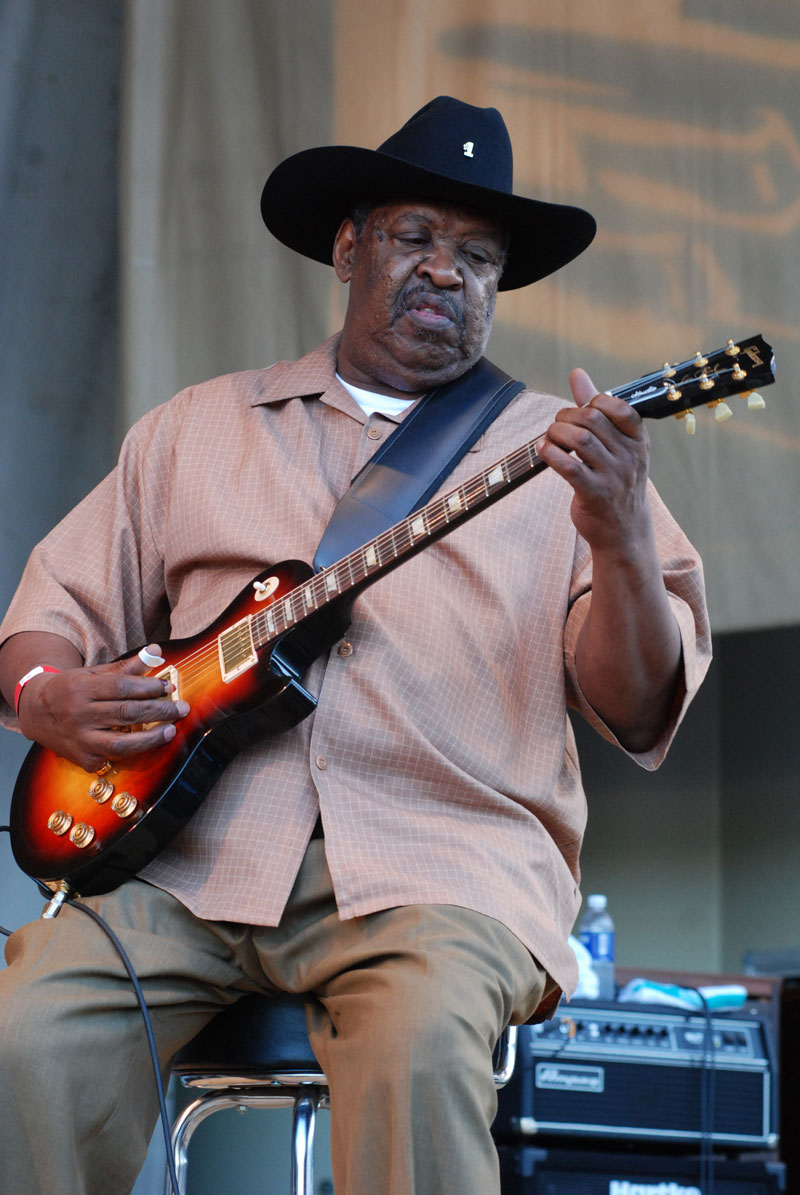
- Magic Slim at the Chicago Blues Festival, 2008

Background information
- Also known as: Magic Slim
- Born: Morris Holt; August 7, 1937; Torrance, Mississippi, United States
- Died: February 21, 2013 (aged 75) Philadelphia, Pennsylvania, United States
- Genre: Blues
- Instruments: Vocals, electric guitar
- Years active: 1955–2013

Morris Holt (August 7, 1937 – February 21, 2013), known as Magic Slim, was an American blues singer and guitarist. Born at Torrance, near Grenada, Mississippi, the son of sharecroppers, he followed blues greats such as Muddy Waters and Howlin' Wolf to Chicago, developing his own place in the Chicago blues scene.

In 2017, Magic Slim was posthumously inducted into the Blues Hall of Fame.

== Biography ==
Magic Slim was forced to give up playing the piano when he lost his little finger in a cotton gin mishap. He moved first to nearby Grenada. He first came to Chicago in 1955 with his friend and mentor Magic Sam. The elder (by six months) Magic (Sam) let the younger Magic (Slim) play bass with his band and gave him his nickname.

At first Slim was not rated very highly by his peers. He returned to Mississippi to work and got his younger brother Nick interested in playing bass. By 1965 he was back in Chicago and in 1970 Nick joined him in his band, the Teardrops. They played in the dim, smoke-filled juke joints popular in Chicago in the 1970s on bandstands barely large enough to hold the musicians.

Slim's recording career began in 1966 with the song "Scufflin'", followed by a number of singles into the mid-1970s. He recorded his first album in 1977, Born Under a Bad Sign, for the French label MCM. During the 1980s, Slim released albums for Alligator, Rooster Blues and Wolf Records and won his first W. C. Handy Award. In 1980 he recorded a cover version of "Mustang Sally".

In 1983, the guitarist John Primer joined the Teardrops and played with the group for 13 years. Releases included Spider in My Stew on Wolf Records – which included the title track "Spider in My Stew", composed by Willie Dixon and originally recorded by Buster Benton - and a 1996 Blind Pig release, Scufflin', which presented the post-Primer lineup with the recent addition of the guitarist and singer Jake Dawson.

In 1994, Slim moved to Lincoln, Nebraska, where the Zoo Bar had been booking him for years. He was frequently accompanied by his son Shawn Holt, an accomplished guitarist and singer.

In 2003, Magic Slim and the Teardrops won the W. C. Handy Award as Blues Band of the Year for the sixth time. They released a live performance on CD and DVD in August 2005 entitled Anything Can Happen.

Slim died at a hospital in Philadelphia, Pennsylvania, on February 21, 2013, at age 75. He had health problems that had worsened while he was on tour several weeks earlier. His manager had stated that bleeding ulcers had sent Slim to the hospital, but that he also suffered from heart, lung and kidney problems.

In May 2013, Magic Slim was posthumously awarded another Blues Music Award in the category Traditional Blues Male Artist. In 2017, Magic Slim was posthumously inducted in to the Blues Hall of Fame.

== Discography ==
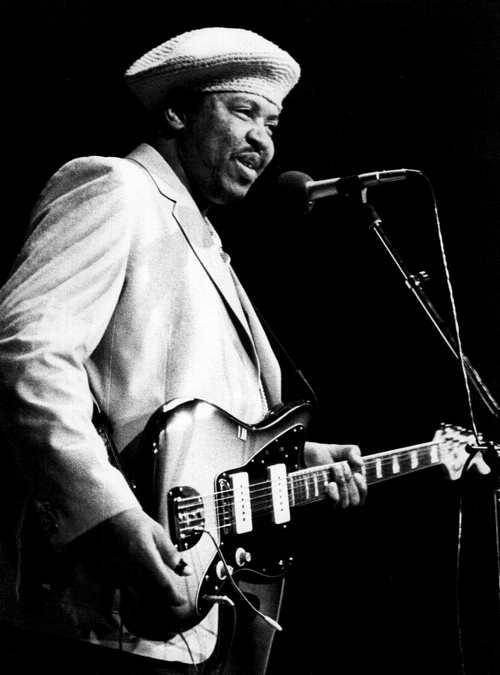
Magic Slim in 1980

- 1977: Born on a Bad Sign (MCM Blues Records, reissued on Storyville)
- 1978: Let Me Love You (Magic Slim, Vol. 2) (MCM Blues Records, reissued on Storyville)
- 1978: Living Chicago Blues, Volume 2 (Alligator 7702)
- 1979: Highway Is My Home (Black & Blue, reissued on Evidence)
- 1980: Live 'n' Blue (Candy Apple 0401)
- 1980: In the Heart of the Blues (Isabel)
- 1981: Doing Fine (Isabel)
- 1982: Raw Magic (Alligator 4728)
- 1982: Grand Slam (Essential Boogie) (Rooster Blues 2618)
- 1983: T.V. Dinner Blues (Blue Dog 001)
- 1984: Blues From the Zoo Bar (Blue Dog 002)
- 1986: Chicago Blues Session, Volume 3 (The 1987 WC Handy Blues Award Winner) (Wolf Records)
- 1987: Chicago Blues Session, Volume 4 (Nora Lee), with Alabama Jr. Pettis and John Primer (Wolf Records)
- 1987: Live at B.L.U.E.S., with John Primer (Blues R&B 3701)
- 1989: Magic Slim Live! (Plymouth House 8902)
- 1989: Chicago Blues Session, Volume 10 (You Can't Lose What You Ain't Never Had) (Wolf Records)
- 1990: Gravel Road (CrossCut Records; Blind Pig Records)
- 1990: Chicago Blues Session, Volume 18 (Live on the Road) (Wolf Records)
- 1992: 44 Blues, with John Primer and Bonnie Lee (Wolf Records)
- 1995: Alone & Unplugged (Wolf Records)
- 1996: Scufflin' (Blind Pig)
- 1998: Black Tornado (Blind Pig)
- 1998: Don't Tell Me About Your Troubles: Zoo Bar Collection, Volume 1, recorded live (Wolf Records)
- 1998: See What You're Doin' To Me: Zoo Bar Collection, Volume 2, recorded live (Wolf Records)
- 1998: Teardrop: Zoo Bar Collection, Volume 3, with John Primer, recorded live (Wolf Records)
- 1998: Spider In My Stew: Zoo Bar Collection, Volume 4, with John Primer, recorded live mid-1980s (Wolf Records)
- 1998: Highway Is My Home: Zoo Bar Collection, Volume 5, with John Primer, recorded live late-1980s (Wolf Records)
- 2000: Snakebite (Blind Pig)
- 2002: Blue Magic, produced by Popa Chubby who played second guitar on 4 tracks (Blind Pig)
- 2005: Anything Can Happen, live (Blind Pig)
- 2006: That Ain't Right, Magic Slim & the Teardrops / Joe Carter with Sunnyland Slim, split album/recorded 1977 (Delmark)
- 2007: The Essential Magic Slim, compilation (Blind Pig)
- 2008: Midnight Blues, with James Cotton, Elvin Bishop, Lil' Ed Williams, Lonnie Brooks and Otis Clay, produced by Nick Moss (Blind Pig)
- 2008: Chapel Hill, with Nalle and Omar Dykes (Marsk Music)
- 2010: Rough Dried Woman, compilation/material recorded 1986–1992 (Wolf Records)
- 2010: Raising the Bar (Blind Pig)
- 2012: Bad Boy (Blind Pig)
- 2012: Tin Pan Alley, compilation/material recorded 1992–1998 (Wolf Records)
- 2013: Magic Blues: The Blues of the Magic Man, compilation (Wolf Records)
- 2014: Pure Magic, compilation/material recorded 1992–1995 (Wolf Records)
- 2019: I'm Gonna Play the Blues, recorded live 2010 (Wolf Records)
- 2024: Slow Blues, with John Primer, compilation (Wolf Records) 2-CD

== See also ==
- List of blues musicians
- Chicago Blues Festival
- San Francisco Blues Festival
- Sweden Rock Festival
- Notodden Blues Festival
- List of stage names
