= Big Bill Morganfield =

American blues singer and guitarist (born 1956)

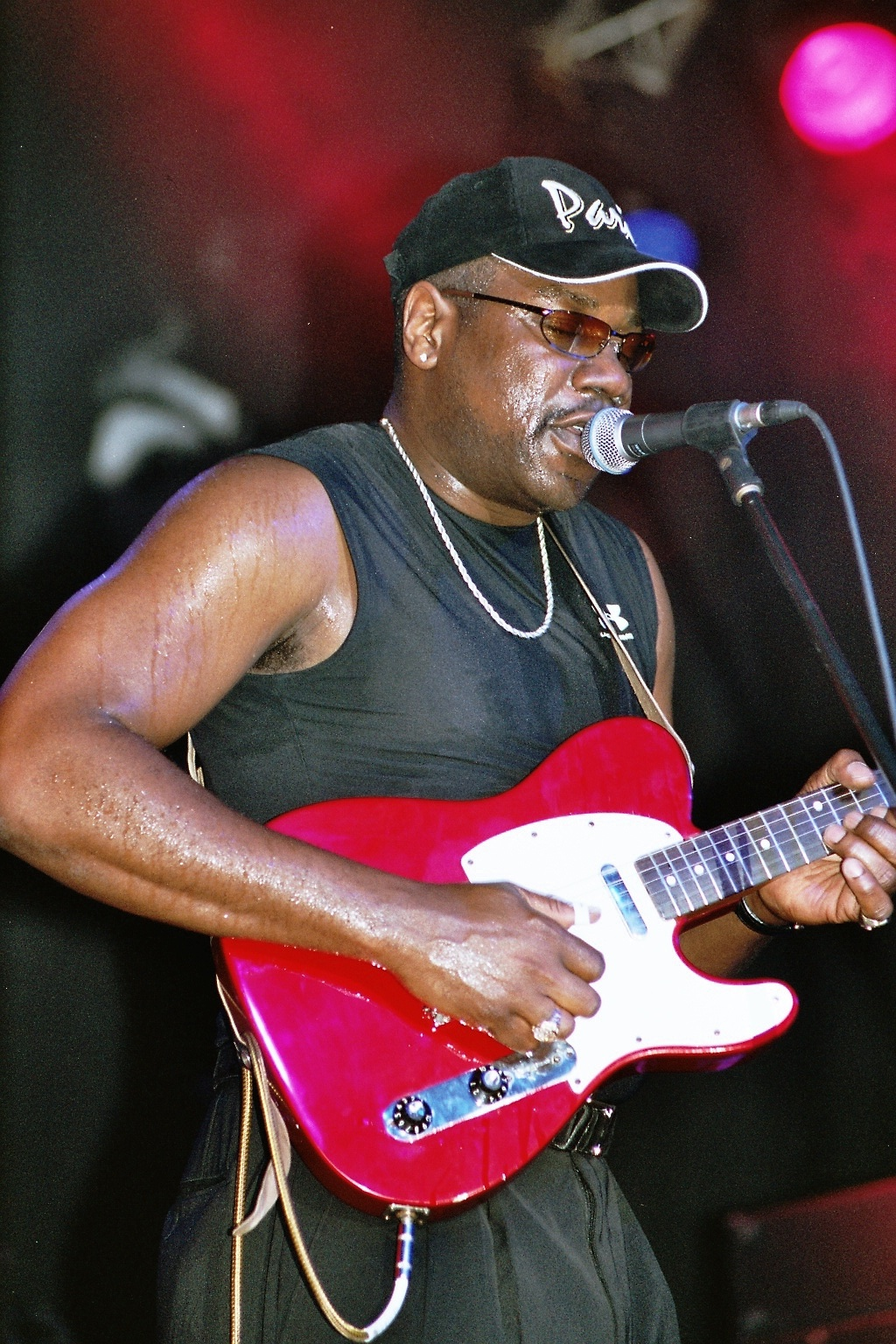
- Morganfield performing at Burnley Blues Festival, April 2006. Photo: Phil Wight

Background information
- Born: William Morganfield; June 19, 1956 (age 70); Chicago, Illinois, United States
- Genres: Blues, R&B, soul
- Occupations: Musician, songwriter, teacher
- Instruments: Vocals, guitar
- Years active: 1990 – present
- Labels: Taxim, Blind Pig, Black Shuck
- Website: Official website

William "Big Bill" Morganfield (born June 19, 1956) is an American blues singer and guitarist. He is the son of McKinley Morganfield, also known as Muddy Waters, and the half-brother of Mud Morganfield.

== Biography ==
Morganfield was born in Chicago, Illinois. He had little contact with his father. Instead he was raised in Southern Florida by his grandmother, and now lives in Atlanta, Georgia. As a child he listened to his father's records, but also to more popular fare such as The Jackson Five. He came to music later in life, having first worked as a teacher after earning a bachelor's degree in English from Tuskegee University and another in Communications from Auburn University. He did not begin playing music seriously until after his father's death in 1983, and then spent six years studying guitar. A well-received performance with Lonnie Mack at Atlanta's Center Stage convinced Morganfield that his career move was a good one, but dissatisfied with his craft, he returned to studying traditional blues forms and songwriting while continuing work as a teacher.

He got his first break in 1996 when he and his band ("The Stone Cold Blues Band" 1996-1998) played at the Blue Angel Cafe in Chattanooga, Tennessee. The band consisted of professional Atlanta based musicians who helped launch his career. In 1998 he then began to play the east coast that led to bigger shows like the "Stan Rogers Folk Fest" and the "Montreal Jazz Festival" .

His first independent album,"Rising Son", was released in 1999 by Blind Pig Records. The album was recorded in Chicago, and featured Paul Oscher, Willie "Big Eyes" Smith, and Pinetop Perkins. In 2000, he won the W.C. Handy Award for Best New Blues Artist. The title cut was featured in the 2004 film A Love Song for Bobby Long. (In 1997 Taxim Records released a demo-intended recording of Big Bill Morganfield called Nineteen Years Old without the consent of Morganfield. American laws do not apply as this recording was taken to Germany for release.)

In 1999, Morganfield appeared at the San Francisco Blues Festival.

Ramblin' Mind, Morganfield's next album, included Taj Mahal on two songs, plus his song "Strong Man Holler". Billy Branch played harmonica on the album. In 2009, Morganfield released the album Born Lover, produced by Bob Margolin and Brian Bisesi.

During the 2000s, Morganfield headlined many festivals and performed at venues around the world. In concert, Morganfield performs his own material with an occasional number from his father's work. He also performed at a Kennedy Center Honors tribute to his father. His version of Waters' "Got My Mojo Working" has been said to be as potent as the original. Tours in Spain that band member Max Drake accompanied him on were particularly popular, due to the legacy connection to Waters.

Morganfield appeared in the Bob Dylan biopic A Complete Unknown (2024), playing the role of a blues musician who meets and jams with Dylan in a TV studio.

== Discography ==
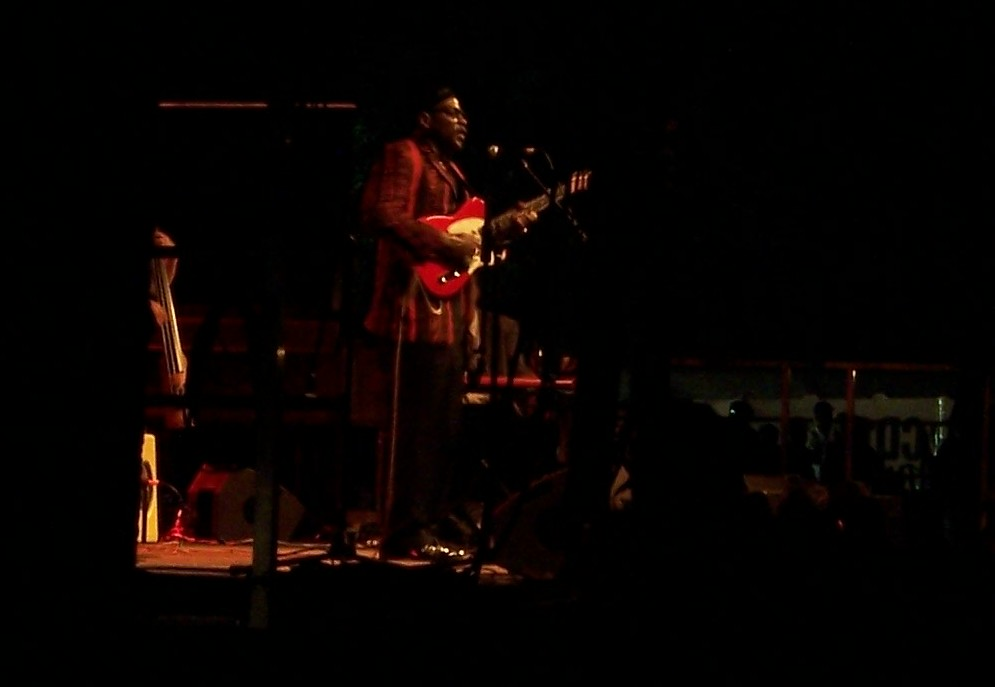
Big Bill Morganfield leading his band at the Red Bank Jazz & Blues Festival, June 2007

- Nineteen Years Old (A Tribute to Muddy Waters) (Taxim, 1997) early demo recordings
- Rising Son (VooDoo/DixieFrog; Blind Pig, 1999)
- Ramblin' Mind (VooDoo/DixieFrog; Blind Pig, 2001)
- Blues in the Blood (VooDoo/DixieFrog; Blind Pig, 2003)
- Born Lover (Black Shuck, 2009)
- Blues with a Mood (Black Shuck, 2013)
- Bloodstains on the Wall (Black Shuck, 2016)

== See also ==
- List of Auburn University people
- List of guitarists by genre
