= Ken Saydak =

American pianist and singer-songwriter

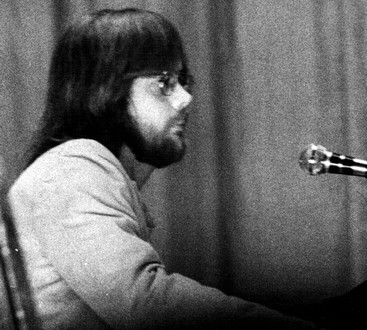
- Saydak in 1976

Background information
- Born: August 18, 1951 (age 74); Chicago, Illinois, United States
- Genres: Blues, Chicago blues, blues-rock, piano blues
- Occupations: Musician, singer-songwriter, session musician
- Instruments: Piano, keyboards, vocals
- Years active: 1972–present
- Label: Various
- Website: Official website

Ken Saydak (born August 18, 1951, Chicago, Illinois, United States) is an American Chicago blues pianist and singer-songwriter. In a long career, he has played as a sideman with Lonnie Brooks, Mighty Joe Young, Johnny Winter and Dave Specter. Saydak has released three albums under his own name since 1999. Billboard once described him as "a gripping frontman".

== Biography ==
During the 1980s, Saydak played on tours and albums by Johnny Winter, including Winter's Grammy Award nominated LP, Guitar Slinger. Following this spell, Saydak became one of the members of the blues rock band, Big Shoulders, who issued two albums (produced by Saydak) before disbanding.

His debut solo album was 1999's Foolish Man released on Delmark Records. Saydak has also produced his own albums, as well as Zora Young's 2000 issue, Learned My Lesson. He has now appeared on over fifty albums.

The Chicago Sun Times reported "Ken Saydak has built an impressive body of work with his three solo albums and his studio work...It's My Soul is his best stand-alone project yet".

== Discography ==
=== Albums ===
- Foolish Man (1999) – Delmark
- Love Without Trust (2001) – Delmark
- It's My Soul (2005) – Evidence

=== Other appearances ===
- 1976 – Mighty Joe Young – Mighty Joe Young – Keyboards
- 1983 – Hot Shot – Lonnie Brooks – Keyboards
- 1984 – Guitar Slinger – Johnny Winter – Keyboards
- 1985 – Serious Business – Johnny Winter – Piano
- 1986 – Third Degree – Johnny Winter – Piano
- 1988 – The Winter of '88 – Johnny Winter – Keyboards
- 1990 – Big Shoulders – Big Shoulders – Organ, piano, accordion, vocals
- 1991 – Nickel History – Big Shoulders – Organ, piano, accordion, vocals
- 1991 – Bluebird Blues – Dave Specter with Bill Smith – Organ, piano
- 1991 – Let Me In – Johnny Winter – Piano
- 1993 – Fortune Tellin' Man – Jesse Fortune – Organ, piano
- 1994 – Blueplicity – Dave Specter – Organ, piano
- 1994 – Gotcha! – Barkin' Bill Smith – Piano
- 1994 – One to Infinity – Tad Robinson – Organ, piano
- 1995 – Had My Fun – Karen Carroll – Organ, piano
- 1995 – Sweetheart of the Blues – Bonnie Lee – Organ, piano
- 1995 – Wild Cards – Al Miller – Organ, piano
- 1996 – Left Turn on Blue – Dave Specter – Organ
- 1996 – Long Way to Ol' Miss – Willie Kent – Piano
- 1996 – Live at Blue Chicago – Johnny B. Moore – Keyboards
- 1997 – 700 Blues – Lurrie Bell – Organ, Piano
- 1997 – Troubled World – Johnny B. Moore – Piano
- 1998 – Blues Spoken Here – Dave Specter and Lenny Lynn – Piano
- 1998 – Kiss of Sweet Blues – Lurrie Bell – Organ, piano
- 1998 – Make Room for the Blues – Willie Kent – Electric piano
- 1998 – Ready – James Wheeler – Piano
- 1999 – Knockin' at Your Door – John Primer – Organ, piano
- 2000 – Can't Take It – James Wheeler – Organ, piano
- 2000 – Learned My Lesson – Zora Young – Organ, piano, producer
- 2000 – Royal Blue – Koko Taylor – Piano
- 2000 – Speculatin' – Dave Specter – Piano
- 2002 – In the House: Live at Lucerne, Vol. 1 – Bob Stroger – Piano, vocals, producer
- 2004 – Have a Little Faith – Mavis Staples – Choir, chorus
- 2004 – Chinatown – Paul Filipowicz – Piano
- 2008 – Tell Me Why – Alex Wilson – Hammond organ

== See also ==
- List of Chicago blues musicians
