= List of songs recorded by Mary J. Blige =

Songs by American singer

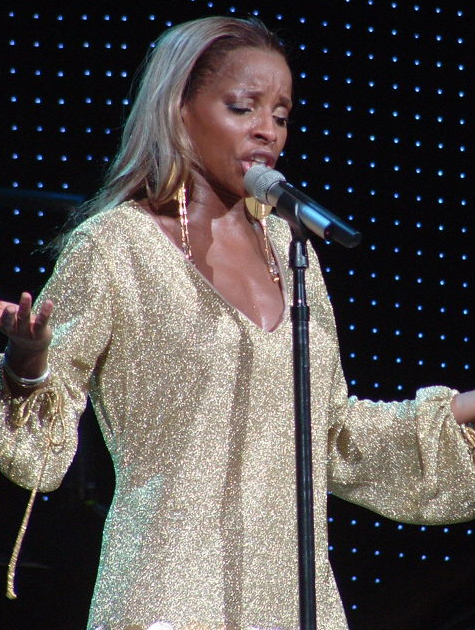
Mary J. Blige performing in December 2006.

This is an alphabetical listing of songs recorded by American singer Mary J. Blige, listing the year of each song's first official release and the album(s) and/or single(s) they were included on.

Mary J. Blige has 15 studio albums in her career so far, as well as a soundtrack album and several compilations containing songs not available on her studio albums.

== Songs ==
Key
•	Indicates single release

Name of song, writers, samples, album and year of release
Song	Writer(s)	Sample(s)	Album or Single	Year	Ref.
"25/8" •	Mary J. Blige; Crystal Johnson; Eric Hudson; Al Sherrod Lambert	"Now That We Found Love" (Kenneth Gamble and Leon Huff)	My Life II... The Journey Continues (Act 1)	2011	
"2U"	Mary J. Blige; Kiyamma Griffin	—	No More Drama	2001	
"911" (Duet with Wyclef Jean)	Wyclef Jean; Jerry Duplessis; Katia Cadet; Mary Brown	—	The Ecleftic: 2 Sides II a Book (Note: Later included on Reflections (A Retrospective) in 2006.)	2000	
"A Dream"	Rodney Jerkins	—	Money Talks (Soundtrack) and The Tour (Japanese edition)	1997	
"A Night to Remember" (Shalamar cover)	Nidra Beard; Charmaine Sylvers; Dana Meyers	—	Think Like a Man Too	2014	
"About You" (featuring will.i.am)	Mary J. Blige will.i.am Keith Harris	"Feeling Good" (Anthony Newley, Leslie Bricusse)	The Breakthrough	2005	
"Ain't No Way" • (Carolyn Franklin cover) (Duet with Whitney Houston or Patti LaBelle) (Note: Mary J. Blige performed this song as a duet with Whitney Houston in 1999 live at VH1 Divas, which was later included on the live album released that year. Mary later recorded a studio version duet with Patti LaBelle for the latter's album Classic Moments, which was also included on the compilation Mary J. Blige & Friends.)	Carolyn Franklin	—	VH1 Divas Live/99 and Classic Moments (Note: Later appeared on the compilation Mary J. Blige & Friends.)	1999 and 2005	
"Ain't Nobody" (Rufus and Chaka Khan cover)	David "Hawk" Wolinski	—	My Life II... The Journey Continues (Act 1)	2011	
"Ain't Really Love"	Mary J. Blige; Bryan-Michael Cox; Johnta Austin; Candice Childress	—	The Breakthrough	2005	
"All Fun and Games"	Terius Nash; Christopher Stewart	—	Think Like a Man Too	2014	
"All My Love"	Mary J. Blige; Bruce Miller; Dmitri Christo; Sean Combs	"Never My Love" by The Association (Donald Addrisi, Richard Addrisi)	Love & Life	2003	
"All That I Can Say" •	Lauryn Hill	—	Mary	1999	
"Alone" (featuring Dave Young)	Davel "Bo" McKenzie; Dave Young	—	The Breakthrough	2005	
"Almost Gone"	Lalah Hathaway	—	Mary (Japanese Edition)	1999	
"Amazing" • (featuring DJ Khaled)	Mary J. Blige; Denisia Andrews; Brittany Coney; DJ Khaled; Street Runner; Tarik Azzouz	"You Don't Love Me" by Willie Cobbs (Willie Cobbs, Ellas McDaniels)	Good Morning Gorgeous	2022	
"As" • (Stevie Wonder cover)	Stevie Wonder	—	Ladies & Gentlemen: The Best of George Michael and Mary (International Editions)	1998	
"Ask Myself" (with Robin Thicke)	Robin Thicke; Bobby Keyes; Robert Daniels	—	Mary J. Blige & Friends	2006	
"Baggage"	Mary J. Blige; James Harris III; Terry Lewis; Bobby Ross Avila; Issiah J. Avila; James O. Wright; Dave Young	—	The Breakthrough	2005	
"Be Happy" •	Mary J. Blige; Arlene DelValle; Sean "Puffy" Combs; Jean-Claude Olivier	"You're So Good to Me" by Curtis Mayfield (Curtis Mayfield) "I Want You" by Marvin Gaye (Leon Ware, Arthur "T-Boy" Ross)	My Life	1994	
"Be with You"	Mary J. Blige; Chucky Thompson; Sean "Puffy" Combs	—	My Life	1994	
"Be Without You" •	Mary J. Blige; Bryan-Michael Cox; Jason Perry; Johnta Austin	—	The Breakthrough	2005	
"Beautiful"	Mary J. Blige; James Harris III; Terry Lewis	—	How Stella Got Her Groove Back (Note: Also released as the b-side of "All That I Can Say".) (Soundtrack)	1998	
"Beautiful Day"	Bruce Miller	—	No More Drama	2001	
"Beautiful Ones"	Cecil Ward; Rich Harrison	"April Fools" by Earl Klugh (Burt Bacharach, Hal David)	Mary	1999	
"Beautiful People"	Mary J. Blige; Kaytranada; Preston Harris	—	Gratitude	2024	
"Better"	Terius Nash; Christopher Stewart	—	Think Like a Man Too	2014	
"Brand New"	Mary J. Blige; Erik Ortiz; Kevin Crowe; Kenneth Bartolomei	—	Stronger with Each Tear (U.S. iTunes Pre-Order edition)	2009	
"Breathing" (featuring Fabolous)	Mary J. Blige; Jocelyn Donald; John Jackson; Jose Leonel Sandoval; Shaun Thomas	"Kick in the Door" by The Notorious B.I.G. (Christopher Wallace, Christopher Martin and Jay Hawkins) "I Put a Spell on You" by Screamin' Jay Hawkins (Jay Hawkins and Herb Slotkin)	Gratitude	2024	
"Can't Get Enough"	Mary J. Blige; James Harris III; Terry Lewis; Bobby Ross Avila; Issiah J. Avila	—	The Breakthrough	2005	
"Can't Get You Off My Mind" (featuring The LOX)	Mary J. Blige; Rodney Jerkins; Jason Phillips; Sean Jacobs; David Styles	—	Share My World	1997	
"Can't Hide from Luv" (featuring Jay-Z)	Mary J. Blige; Andre Harris; Vidal Davis; Ryan Toby	—	The Breakthrough	2005	
"Can't Wait for You"	Mary J. Blige; Denisia Andrews; Brittany Coney; Gabriella Wilson; Rodney Jerkins	—	Gratitude	2024	
"Cargo"	Terius Nash; Christopher Stewart; Mary J. Blige	"Fool Yourself" by Little Feat (Fred Tackett)	Think Like a Man Too	2014	
"Changes I've Been Going Through"	Mark Morales; Mark C. Rooney; Sean Combs	"Make the Music with Your Mouth, Biz" by Biz Markie (Marley Marl, Biz Markie)	What's the 411?	1992	
"Checkin' for Me"	Cecil Ward; Chucky Thompson	—	No More Drama (2001 UK Edition & 2002 Japanese Edition) "Family Affair" (US CD single)	2001	
"City on Fire"	Jeff Bhasker; Pat Reynolds; Mary J. Blige	—	Stronger with Each Tear (Reissue releases only)	2010	
"Closer"	Mary J. Blige; LaNeah Menzies	—	Stronger with Each Tear (U.S. iTunes edition)	2009	
"Color" (Note: Known as "I Can See in Color" on some editions of the album.)	Mary J. Blige; Raphael Saadiq; LaNeah Menzies	—	Stronger with Each Tear	2009	
"Come See About Me"	Mary J. Blige; Jocelyn "Jazzy" Donald; Ant Clemons; Marcello Valenzano; Andre Christopher Lyon; Leon Michaels	—	Good Morning Gorgeous	2022	
"Come to Me (Peace)"	Mary J. Blige (Lyrics and Melody); Terius Nash (Lyrics and Melody); Christopher Stewart (Music); Kuk Harrell (Music)	—	Growing Pains	2007	
"Confrontation" (Funkmaster Flex and Big Kap featuring Mary J. Blige)	Aston Taylor; Mary J. Blige; Joseph Brim; James Heard; Lorenzo Grooms; Anthony Prendatt; Alphonse Constant; Patrick Harvey	"Where My Homiez" by Ill Al Skratch (Lorenzo Grooms, Anthony Prendatt, Alphonse Constant, Patrick Harvey)	The Tunnel and Mary (U.S. Limited Edition)	1999	
"Crazy Games"	Mary J. Blige; Kenny Dickerson	—	No More Drama (2001 Edition)	2001	
"Dance for Me" •	Bruce Miller; Mary J. Blige; Ahkim Miller	"The Bed's Too Big Without You" by The Police (Sting)	No More Drama	2001	
"Deep Inside" • (featuring Elton John)	Mary J. Blige; Tara Geter; Kevin Deane	"Bennie and the Jets" by Elton John (Elton John, Bernie Taupin)	Mary	1999	
"Destiny"	Mary J. Blige; Bryan Reeves; Kiyamma Griffin; Bryan Peguero	"Don't Let Me Be Misunderstood" by Nina Simone (Bennie Benjamin, Sol Marcus, Gloria Caldwell)	No More Drama (2001 Edition)	2001	
"Didn't Mean"	Mary J. Blige; Sean Combs; Dimitri Cristo	"Find a Way" by A Tribe Called Quest (Ali Shaheed Muhammad, Kamaal Fareed, Malik Taylor, Dong Hwa Chung, Bebel Gilberto, James Yancey)	Love & Life (International pressings)	2003	
"Do You Hear What I Hear?" • (featuring Jessie J) (Harry Simeone cover)	Noël Regney; Gloria Shayne Baker	—	A Mary Christmas	2012	
"Don't Fuck Up"	Mary J. Blige; Shaun Thomas	—	Gratitude	2024	
"Don't Go"	Mary J. Blige; Big Bub; Faith Evans; Chucky Thompson; Sean "Puffy" Combs	"Goodbye Love" by Guy (Teddy Riley, G. Griffen, Aaron Hall, Timmy Gatling) "Stay with Me" by DeBarge (Mark DeBarge, El DeBarge, Etterlene "Bunny" Jordan)	My Life	1994	
"Don't Go"	Mary J. Blige; Bruce Miller; Deric Angelettie; Sean Combs	"The Long Goodbye" by Lou Donaldson (John Williams, Johnny Mercer)	Love & Life	2003	
"Don't Mind" •	Mary J. Blige; Priscilla Renea; Jerry Duplessis	—	My Life II... The Journey Continues (Act 1)	2011	
"Don't Walk Away"	Bryce Wilson; Mary J. Blige; Darryl Brown	—	"Missing You" (Note: Previously included on a Cassette promo of Share My World but did not make the final tracklist.) (UK CD2)	1997	
"Don't Waste Your Time" (Duet with Aretha Franklin)	Gen Rubin; Denise Rich	—	Mary	1999	
"Doubt" •	Mary J. Blige; Sam Romans	—	The London Sessions	2014	
"Each Tear" (Note: The original 2009 version was solely sung by Mary. Later versions from 2010 pressings of the album feature Jay Sean, Tiziano Ferro, Vanessa Amorosi, Rea Garvey or K'naan depending on the country.) •	Mary J. Blige; Dwayne Chin-Qee; Mitchum Chin	—	Stronger with Each Tear	2009	
"Empty Prayers"	Mary J. Blige; Christopher "Tricky" Stewart; Crystal Johnson; Kenneth Coby	—	My Life II... The Journey Continues (Act 1)	2011	
"Enough"	Mary J. Blige; Bianca "Blush" Atterbury; Marcello Valenzano; Andre Christopher Lyon; Peter Skellern	—	Good Morning Gorgeous	2022	
"Enough Cryin" • (featuring Brook Lynn)	Mary J. Blige; Rodney Jerkins; Sean Garrett; Sean Carter	—	The Breakthrough	2005	
"Everyday"	Angie Stone; D'Angelo	—	"Everything" (UK CD2)	1997	
"Everyday It Rains"	Sean "Puffy" Combs; Nashiem Myrick	"It's Your Thing" by The Isley Brothers (Ronald Isley, O'Kelly Isley Jr., Rudolph Isley)	The Show (Soundtrack) (Note: Previously included on a Cassette promo of My Life but did not make the final tracklist. Later appeared on the 2019 compilation HERstory, Vol.1.)	1995	
"Everything" •	James Harris III; Terry Lewis	"You Are My Everything" by The Stylistics (Thom Bell, Linda Creed) "The Payback" by James Brown (James Brown, Fred Wesley, John Starks)	Share My World	1997	
"Fade Away"	Mary J. Blige; Shaffer Smith (Lyrics); Mikkel S. Eriksen; Tor Erik Hermansen	—	Growing Pains	2007	
"Failing in Love"	Mary J. Blige; Jocelyn "Jozzy" Donald; London on da Track; Slim Wav; Archer	—	Good Morning Gorgeous	2022	
"Family Affair" •	Mary J. Blige; Bruce Miller; Andre Young; Camara Kambon; Asiah Lewis; Luchana N. Lodge; Mike Elizondo	—	No More Drama	2001	
"Favorite Flavor" (LL Cool J featuring Mary J. Blige)	James Todd Smith; Jean-Claude Olivier; Samuel Barnes; Ryan Toby	—	Todd Smith (Note: Also appears on the compilation album Mary J. Blige & Friends.)	2006	
"Father in You"	Mary J. Blige; Andre Harris; Vidal Davis; Ryan Toby	—	The Breakthrough	2005	
"Feel Inside" (featuring Nas)	Mary J. Blige; Andrea Martin; Jerry Duplessis; Arden Altino; Nasir Jones; Dennis Coles; Robert Diggs; Gary Grice; Lamont Hawkins; Darryl Hill; Jason Hunter; Russell Jones; Clifford Smith; Elgin Turner; Corey Woods	—	My Life II... The Journey Continues (Act 1)	2011	
"Feel Like a Woman"	Mary J. Blige; Theron Feemster; Terius Nash	—	Growing Pains	2007	
"Feel Like Makin Love"	Mary J. Blige; Mechalie Jamison; Steven Jordan; Sean Combs	—	Love & Life	2003	
"Find the Love"	Mary J. Blige; Cainon Lamb; Derrick Baker; Vincent Berry II; Cortni Elisa Jordan	—	Strength of a Woman	2017	
"Flying Away"	Mary J. Blige	"God Bless You" by Brenda Russell (Brenda Russell)	No More Drama	2001	
"Follow" (with Disclosure)	Mary J. Blige; James Napier; Guy Lawrence; Howard Lawrence	—	The London Sessions	2014	
"Forever No More" (Poem)	Mary J. Blige	—	No More Drama	2001	
"Friends"	Mary J. Blige; Sean Foote; Majid Hasan; Mario Winans; Stevie J	"Mellow Mood (Part 1)" by Barry White (Barry White, Tom Brock, Robert Taylor)	Love & Life	2003	
"Get It Right" (featuring Taraji P. Henson)	Mary J. Blige; Crystal Johnson; Ronnie Jackson	—	My Life II... The Journey Continues (Act 1) (U.S. iTunes store edition)	2011	
"Get to Know You Better"	Bryce Wilson	—	Share My World	1997	
"Girl from Yesterday"	Cecil Ward; Chucky Thompson	—	No More Drama (Japanese Pressings and UK 2002 Edition Bonus Track)	2001	
"Give Me You" •	Diane Warren	—	Mary	1999	
"Glow Up" (featuring Quavo, DJ Khaled and Missy Elliott)	Mary J. Blige; Darhyl Camper, Jr. Jazmine Sullivan; Khaled Khaled; Quavious Marshall; Melissa Elliott	—	Strength of a Woman	2017	
"GMG" (Interlude)	—	—	Good Morning Gorgeous	2022	
"God's Child" (featuring Fat Joe)	Mary J. Blige; Joseph Cartagena; Erskine Isaac; Bryan Jones; Pat Kelly; Angelo Velasquez	—	Gratitude	2024	
"Gone Forever" (featuring Remy Ma and DJ Khaled)	Mary J. Blige; Benjamin Diehl; Brittany Coney; Denisia Andrews; DJ Khaled; Giorgio Moroder; Nicholas Warwar; Raney Shockne; Reminisce Mackie; Tarik Azzouz	—	Good Morning Gorgeous (Deluxe Edition)	2022	
"Good Love" (featuring T.I.)	Shaffer Smith; Jeremy Reeves; Ray Romulus; Jonathan Yip	—	Stronger with Each Tear	2009	
"Good Morning Gorgeous" •	Mary J. Blige; Dernst "D'Mile" Emile II; H.E.R. David "Lucky Daye" Brown; Tiara Thomas	—	Good Morning Gorgeous	2022	
"Gonna Breakthrough" (featuring Brook Lynn)	Mary J. Blige; Diana Gordon; Dernst Emile; Quarun Wages	"The Champ" by The Mohawks (Harry Palmer)	The Breakthrough	2005	
"Gonna Make It" (Jazmine Sullivan)	Mary J. Blige; Jazmine Sullivan	—	Stronger with Each Tear (U.S. Amazon.com MP3 download edition)	2009	
"Good Woman Down"	Mary J. Blige; Sean Garrett; Patrick Douthit	"Heart Breaking Decision" by Meli'sa Morgan (Robert Aries, Freddy Jackson and Meli'sa Morgan)	The Breakthrough	2005	
"Grown Woman" (featuring Ludacris)	Mary J. Blige; Terius Nash; Dejion Madison; Christopher Bridges	—	Growing Pains	2007	
"Happy Endings"	Mary J. Blige; Herb Middleton	—	Love & Life (Standard Japanese edition)	2003	
"Have Yourself a Merry Little Christmas" (Judy Garland cover)	Hugh Martin; Ralph Blane	—	A Mary Christmas	2012	
"He Think I Don't Know"	Gerald Isaac	—	No More Drama (2002 Edition)	2002	
"Hello Father"	Mary J. Blige; Benjamin Wright; Chauncey Hollis	—	Strength of a Woman	2017	
"Hello It's Me" (Nazz cover)	Todd Rungren	—	Growing Pains (iTunes, U.K. and Japanese editions)	2007	
"Here I Am"	Mary J. Blige; Storm Ford; Shaun Thomas	—	Gratitude	2024	
"Here with Me" • (featuring Anderson .Paak)	Mary J. Blige; Anderson .Paak; Ant Clemons; Uforo "Bongo" Ebong	—	Good Morning Gorgeous	2022	
"Hurt Again"	Mary J. Blige; Andre Harris; Vidal Davis; Brian Sledge	—	Growing Pains	2007	
"I Am" •	Mary J. Blige; Mikkel S. Eriksen; Tor Erik Hermansen; Johnta Austin; Ester Dean; Magnus Beite	—	Stronger with Each Tear	2009	
"I Can Love You" • (featuring Lil' Kim)	Mary J. Blige; LaTonya Blige-DaCosta; Rodney Jerkins	"Queen Bitch" by Lil' Kim (Lil' Kim, Carlos Broady, Nashiem Myrick)	Share My World	1997	
"I Can't Wait" (featuring will.i.am)	Mary J. Blige; William Adams	—	Stronger with Each Tear (Reissue releases only)	2010	
"I Don't Want to Do Anything" • (Duet with K-Ci Hailey)	Devante Swing	—	What's the 411?	1992	
"I Feel Good"	Shaffer Smith; Mikkel S. Eriksen; Tor Erik Hermansen	—	Stronger with Each Tear	2009	
"I Found My Everything" (featuring Raphael Saadiq)	Mary J. Blige; Raphael Saadiq; Kevin Wooten; Robert Ozuna	—	The Breakthrough	2005	
"I Got Plans" (featuring Ferg)	Mary J. Blige; Dernst Emile II; Darold Ferguson Jr. Akil King; Kimberly Krysiuk; Cassidy Podell	—	Gratitude (Target edition)	2024	
"I Guess That's Why They Call It the Blues" (Elton John featuring Mary J. Blige)	Elton John; Bernie Taupin; Davey Johnstone	—	Elton John One Night Only – The Greatest Hits (Note: A live version appears on Elton John's live album One Night Only and the 2006 compilation album Mary J. Blige & Friends. A studio version was also recorded and released promotionally.)	2000	
"I Love U (Yes I Du)"	Mary J. Blige; Jamal Jones; Ester Dean; Devon Reed	"Let the Dollar Circulate" by Billy Paul (Donald Level and Billy Paul Williams)	Stronger with Each Tear	2009	
"I Love You" •	Mary J. Blige; Sean "Puffy" Combs	"Ike's Mood I" by Isaac Hayes	My Life	1994	
"I Never Wanna Live Without You"	Mary J. Blige; Big Bub; Faith Evans; Chucky Thompson; Sean "Puffy" Combs; Herb Middleton	—	My Life	1994	
"I Want You"	Jerry Duplessis; Arden Altino; Jazmine Sullivan	—	Think Like a Man Too	2014	
"I'll Be There for You/You're All I Need to Get By" • (Method Man featuring Mary J. Blige)	Clifford Smith; Robert Diggs	"You're All I Need to Get By" by Marvin Gaye and Tammi Terrell (Nickolas Ashford and Valerie Simpson)	Tical (Note: Later included on Reflections (A Retrospective) in 2006.)	1995	
"I'm Goin' Down" • (Rose Royce cover)	Norman Whitfield; Joel Schumacher	—	My Life	1994	
"I'm in Love" (The Gap Band cover)	Ronnie Wilson; Lonnie Wilson	—	Mary	1999	
"I'm the Only Woman"	Mary J. Blige	"Give Me Your Love" by Curtis Mayfield (Curtis Mayfield)	My Life	1994	
"If I Don't Love You This Way" (Jackson 5 cover)	Leon Ware; Pam Sawyer	—	Love & Life (Japanese Standard and UK First Pressing Editions)	2003	
"If You Love Me?"	Johnta Austin; Bryan-Michael Cox	—	Growing Pains	2007	
"In the Meantime"	Mary J. Blige; Terry Robinson	—	No More Drama	2001	
"In the Morning"	Mary J. Blige; Dernst Emile; Anesha Birchett; Antea Birchett	—	Stronger with Each Tear	2009	
"Indestructible"	Mary J. Blige; Brandon Hodge; Davion Farris; Eric Dawkins; Elese Teyonie Russell	—	Strength of a Woman	2017	
"Irreversible"	Harmony Samuels; Courtney Harrell; Donnell Shawn; Bryan Clark; Mary J. Blige	—	My Life II... The Journey Continues (Act 1) (U.S. Deluxe and Japanese editions)	2011	
"It's a Wrap" •	Mary J. Blige; Sean Combs; Mario Winans	—	Love & Life	2003	
"It's Me"	Mary J. Blige; Priscilla Renea; Brandon Hodge; Richard Butler; Dwayne Nesmith; Tremaine Neverson	—	Strength of a Woman	2017	
"It's On" (featuring R. Kelly)	R. Kelly	—	Share My World	1997	
"Just Fine" •	Mary J. Blige (Lyrics and Melody); Terius Nash (Lyrics and Melody); Christopher Stewart (Music); Phalon Alexander (Music)	—	Growing Pains	2007	
"Keep It Moving"	Mary J. Blige; Bruce Miller; Dana Stinson	—	No More Drama (2001 Edition)	2001	
"Keep Your Head"	Mary J. Blige; LaTonya Blige-DaCosta	—	Share My World	1997	
"King & Queen" (Duet with John Legend)	John Legend; Avriele Crandle	"Visions" by Stevie Wonder (Paul Bollenback and Stevie Wonder)	Once Again and Reflections (A Retrospective)	2006	
"Kiss and Make Up"	Priscilla Renea Hamilton; Mary J. Blige; LaShawn Daniels; Ronald "Flippa" Colson; Warren "Oak" Felder; Andrew "Pop" Wansel; Stephen Mostyn; Raysean Hairston	"Every Generation" by Ronnie Laws (Ronnie Laws)	Think Like a Man Too	2014	
"Kitchen"	Mary J. Blige; Terius Nash; Christopher Stewart	—	Stronger with Each Tear (Original 2009 release only)	2009	
"Know" •	Mary J. Blige; Denisia Andrews; Brittany Coney; Mark Spears	—	Non-album single	2019	
"Let Me Be the 1" (featuring 50 Cent)	Mary J. Blige; Mechalie Jamison; Curtis Jackson; Malik Crosby; Cecil Sanchez; Sean Combs; Mario Winans	"I'll Bet You" by The Jackson 5 (George Clinton, Sidney Barnes, Theresa Lindsey)	Love & Life	2003	
"Let No Man Put Asunder" (First Choice cover)	Bruce Gray; Bruce Hawes	—	Mary	1999	
"Little Drummer Boy" (Trapp Family cover)	Katherine Kennicott Davis; Henry Onorati; Harry Simeone	—	A Mary Christmas	2012	
"Long Hard Look"	Sam Romans; Harry Craze; Hugo Chegwin; Ben Harrison; James Murray; Mustafa Omar	—	The London Sessions	2014	
"Love"	Mary J. Blige; Bruce Miller; Ron Lawrence; Kwame Holland	—	No More Drama	2001	
"Love @ 1st Sight" • (featuring Method Man)	Mary J. Blige; Mechalie Jamison; Mario Winans; Sean Combs; Clifford Smith; Steven Jordan	"Hot Sex" by A Tribe Called Quest (Kamaal Fareed, Ali Muhammad, Malik Taylor)	Love & Life	2003	
"Love a Woman" (featuring Beyoncé)	Mary J. Blige; Sean Garrett; Beyoncé Knowles; Menardini Timothee	—	My Life II... The Journey Continues (Act 1)	2011	
"Love Changes" (Jamie Foxx featuring Mary J. Blige)	Warryn Campbell; Breyon Prescott	—	Unpredictable (Note: Also appears on the compilation album Mary J. Blige & Friends.)	2005	
"Love in the Middle"	Mary J. Blige; Brandon Hodge	—	Strength of a Woman (Target edition)	2017	
"Love Is All We Need" • (featuring Nas)	James Harris III; Terry Lewis; Mary J. Blige	"Moonchild" by Rick James (Rick James)	Share My World	1997	
"Love No Limit" •	Kenneth "G-Love" Greene; Dave "Jam" Hall	—	What's the 411?	1992	
"Love Will Never"	Mary J. Blige; Jocelyn "Jazzy" Donald; Uforo "Bongo" Ebong; Eric Hudson; Phil Lewis	—	Good Morning Gorgeous	2022	
"Love Without the Heartbreak"	Mary J. Blige; Anderson .Paak; Rogėt Chahayed; Alissia Benveniste	—	Good Morning Gorgeous	2022	
"Love Yourself" • (featuring Kanye West)	Mary J. Blige; Kanye West; Charles Hinshaw; David D. Brown; Darhyl Camper	"Nobody Knows" by The SCLC Operation Breadbasket Orchestra And Choir (I. Andrews)	Strength of a Woman	2017	
"Mary, Did You Know?" (Michael English)	Mark Lowry; Buddy Greene	—	A Mary Christmas	2012	
"Mary Jane" •	Mary J. Blige	"All Night Long" by Mary Jane Girls (Rick James) "Close the Door" by Teddy Pendergrass (Kenny Gamble, Leon Huff)	My Life	1994	
"Mary's Joint"	Mary J. Blige; Sean "Puffy" Combs; Chucky Thompson	—	My Life	1994	
"Memories"	Carsten Schack; Kenneth Karlin; Chanette Higgens; Channoah Higgens; Mary J. Blige	—	Mary	1999	
"Midnight Drive" (featuring Brook Lynn)	Rico Love; Pierre Medor	—	My Life II... The Journey Continues (Act 1)	2011	
"Mirror" (featuring Eve)	Mary J. Blige (Lyrics and Melody); Terius Nash (Lyrics and Melody); Eve Jeffers (Lyrics and Melody); Christopher Stewart (Music)	—	Growing Pains (iTunes, U.K. and Japanese editions)	2007	
"Miss Me with That"	Amber Streeter; Harvey Mason; Damon Thomas; Mansur Zafr; Lamar Edwards	—	My Life II... The Journey Continues (Act 1) (U.S. Deluxe and Japanese editions)	2011	
"Missing You" •	Babyface	—	Share My World	1997	
"Misty Blue" (Wilma Burgess cover)	Bob Montgomery	—	The Tour	1998	
"MJB Da MVP" •	Curtis Jackson; Jayceon Taylor; Andre Lyon; Marcello Valenzano	"Rubberband" by The Tramps (Ronnie Baker, Allan Felder and Norman Harris) "All Night Long" by Nayobe (James Johnson) "Remind Me" by Patrice Rushen (Patrice Rushen and Karen Evans) "Everybody Loves the Sunshine" (Roy Ayers)	The Breakthrough	2005	
"Moment of Love"	Terius Nash; Christopher Stewart	—	Think Like a Man Too	2014	
"Mr. Wrong" • (featuring Drake)	James Scheffer; Aubrey Graham; Richard Butler, Jr. Daniel Morris	"Me and Mrs. Jones" by Billy Paul (Kenneth Gamble, Leon Huff and Cary Gilbert)	My Life II... The Journey Continues (Act 1)	2011	
"My Life" (Note: A re-recorded version was released in 2006 on Reflections (A Retrospective).)	Mary J. Blige; Arlene DelValle; Chucky Thompson; Sean "Puffy" Combs	"Everybody Loves the Sunshine" by Roy Ayers (Roy Ayers)	My Life	1994	
"My Love" •	Kenneth "G-Love" Greene; Dave "Jam" Hall	—	What's the 411?	1992	
"My Loving"	Mary J. Blige; Sam Romans; Rodney Jerkins	—	The London Sessions	2014	
"My Man" (Santana featuring Big Boi and Mary J. Blige)	Antwan Patton; Nsilo Reddick; Nicholas Sherwood; Rob Thomas	—	All That I Am (Note: Also appears on the compilation album Mary J. Blige & Friends.)	2005	
"Need Love" (featuring Usher)	Mary J. Blige; Charles A. Hinshaw; Anthony Jermaine White; Kim Owens	—	Good Morning Gorgeous	2022	
"Need Someone"	Matt Morris	—	My Life II... The Journey Continues (Act 1)	2011	
"Need You More" (featuring Jadakiss)	Mary J. Blige; LaTonya Blige-DaCosta; Rodney Jerkins; Jason Philips; Joshua Pyle	"Hold On" by En Vogue (Thomas McElroy, Denzil Foster, Terry Ellis, Cindy Herron, Maxine Jones, Dawn Robinson)	Gratitude	2024	
"Never Been"	Missy Elliott; Henri Charlemagne	"Why Oh Why" by McFadden & Whitehead (Gene McFadden, John Whitehead, Jerry Cohen)	No More Drama	2001	
"Never Give Up on Me"	Mary J. Blige; Dernst Emile II; Akil King; Kim Krysiuk; Cassidy Podell	"My Love Doesn't Come Easy" by Jean Carn (Eddie Levert, Dennis Williams, Mike Jackson)	Gratitude	2024	
"Next Level" (featuring Busta Rhymes)	Mary J. Blige; Richard Butler, Jr. Trevor Smith, Jr. Nathaniel Hills	—	My Life II... The Journey Continues (Act 1)	2011	
"No Condition"	Mary J. Blige; Kevin Cossom; Marcella Araica; Nathaniel Hills	—	My Life II... The Journey Continues (Act 1)	2011	
"No Happy Holidays"	Mary J. Blige; Kiyamma Griffin; Tara Geter	—	Mary	1999	
"No Idea"	Mary J. Blige; Anderson Paak; Uforo "Bongo" Ebong; Eric Hudson; Adriana Flores; Bryan Ponce	—	Good Morning Gorgeous	2022	
"No More Drama" •	James Harris III; Terry Lewis	"The Young and the Restless Theme" (Barry Devorzan, Perry Botkin Jr.)	No More Drama	2001	
"No One Else"	K-Ci Hailey	"Free at Last" by Al Green (Al Green) "La Di Da Di" by Doug E. Fresh and MC Ricky D (Doug E. Fresh, MC Ricky D)	My Life	1994	
"No One Will Do"	Erik Ortiz; Kevin Crowe; Clifford L. Brown III; Dave Young	"I Swear I Love No One but You" by The O'Jays; Bunny Sigler	The Breakthrough	2005	
"Nobody but You"	Mary J. Blige; Sam Smith; James Napier; Matthew Coleman	—	The London Sessions	2014	
"Nobody but You"	Mary J. Blige; David Grant; Rodney Jerkins; Astyn Turrentine	—	Gratitude	2024	
"Noche De Paz (Silent Night)" (featuring Marc Anthony)	Traditional	—	A Mary Christmas	2012	
"Not Gon' Cry" •	Babyface	—	Waiting to Exhale (Soundtrack) and Share My World	1996	
"Not Lookin'" (featuring K-Ci Hailey)	Mary J. Blige; Jean Norris; Dean Hostler; Ike Lee	—	Mary	1999	
"Not Loving You"	James Napier; Sam Smith	—	The London Sessions	2014	
"Not Today" • (featuring Eve)	Mary J. Blige; Bruce Miller; Andre Young; Ron Feemster; Mike Elizondo; Eve Jeffers	—	Love & Life	2003	
"Nowhere Fast" (Brook Lynn featuring Mary J. Blige)	Mary J. Blige (Lyrics and Melody); Terius Nash (Lyrics and Melody); Christopher Stewart (Music); Phalon Alexander (Music)	—	Growing Pains (iTunes, U.K. and Japanese editions)	2007	
"On Top" (featuring Fivio Foreign)	Mary J. Blige; Jocelyn "Jozzy" Donald; Marcello Valenzano; Andre Christopher Lyon; Shawn Hibbler; Jamie Hurton; Thomas Bell; Alexander Hart	—	Good Morning Gorgeous	2022	
"One" • (Mary J. Blige and U2)	Bono; Adam Clayton; The Edge; Larry Mullen Jr.	—	The Breakthrough	2005	
"One Life"	Mary J. Blige; Ester Dean; Mikkel S. Eriksen; Tor Erik Hermansen; Calvin Harris	—	My Life II... The Journey Continues (Act 1) (U.K. Deluxe and Japanese editions)	2011	
"Only Love" •	Mary J. Blige; David "Lucky Daye" Brown; Warren Felder; Andrew Wansel	"Doctor Love" by First Choice (Allan Felder, Norman Harris, Ron Tyson)	Non-album single	2018	
"Ooh!" •	Mary J. Blige; Mechalie Jamison; Dimitri Christo; Sean Combs	"Singing This Song for My Mother" by Bohannon	Love & Life	2003	
"Our Love"	Charles Jackson; Marvin Yancy	—	Share My World	1997	
"Out My Head"	Dave Young; Rich Harrison	—	The Breakthrough (Japanese edition) "Enough Cryin" (UK CD2 and European Maxi-Single)	2005	
"Overjoyed" (Stevie Wonder cover)	Stevie Wonder	—	Ballads	2000	
"Petit Papa Noël" (Tino Rossi cover)	Raymond Vincy; Henri Martinet	—	A Mary Christmas	2012	
"Pick Me Up"	Mary J. Blige; Emeli Sandé; Shahid Khan; Shakil Ashraf	—	The London Sessions	2014	
"PMS"	Mary J. Blige; Terri Robinson; Tara Tillman; Chucky Thompson	"Simply Beautiful" by Al Green (Al Green)	No More Drama	2001	
"Power Back"	Terius Nash; Christopher Stewart; Mary J. Blige	—	Think Like a Man Too	2014	
"Press On"	Mary J. Blige; Keir Gist; Charmelle Cofield	"Summer Breeze" by Seals and Crofts (Jimmy Seals, Darrell Crofts)	Love & Life	2003	
"Propose"	Terius Nash; Christopher Stewart	—	Think Like a Man Too	2014	
"Rainy Dayz" • (featuring Ja Rule)	Jeffrey Atkins; Irving Lorenzo	—	No More Drama (2002 Edition)	2002	
"Real Love" •	Mark C. Rooney; Mark Morales	"Top Billin'" by Audio Two (Kirk Robinson)	What's the 411?	1992	
"Reflections (I Remember)"	Mary J. Blige; Bryan-Michael Cox; Kendrick Dean; Johnta Austin	—	Reflections (A Retrospective)	2006	
"Reminisce" •	Kenneth "G-Love" Greene; Dave "Jam" Hall	"Stop, Look, Listen" by MC Lyte (MC Lyte)	What's the 411?	1992	
"Rent Money" (featuring Dave East)	Mary J. Blige; Shawn Butler; Dernst "D'Mile" Emile II; Dave East; Sean Combs; Robert Kelly; Christopher Wallace; Daron Jones	—	Good Morning Gorgeous	2022	
"Right Now" •	Mary J. Blige; Sam Smith; James Napier; Guy Lawrence; Howard Lawrence	—	The London Sessions	2014	
"Roses"	Mary J. Blige (Lyrics and Melody); Terius Nash (Lyrics and Melody); Christopher Stewart (Music)	—	Growing Pains	2007	
"Round and Round"	Poke; Mary J. Blige	"D'Evils" (DJ Premier, Shawn Carter)	Share My World	1997	
"Rudolph, The Read-Nosed Reindeer" (Gene Autry cover)	Johnny Marks	—	A Mary Christmas	2012	
"Running" (featuring Ne-Yo)	Mary J. Blige; Shaffer Smith; Kasseem Dean; Arden Altino	—	Good Morning Gorgeous (Target edition)	2022	
"Said and Done"	Mary J. Blige; Ryan Leslie	—	Stronger with Each Tear (Original 2009 release only)	2009	
"Searching" (featuring Roy Ayers)	Mary J. Blige; LaTonya Blige-DaCosta; Xenos DaCosta; Rodney Jerkins; Fred Jerkins III	"Searching" by Roy Ayers (Roy Ayers)	Share My World	1997	
"See That Boy Again" (featuring Pharrell Williams)	Pharrell Williams	—	Think Like a Man Too	2014	
"Self Love"	Daryhl Camper; Samuel Dew; Mary J. Blige	—	Think Like a Man Too	2014	
"Set Me Free" •	Mary J. Blige; Darhyl Camper; Jazmine Sullivan; Charles Hinshaw	—	Strength of a Woman	2017	
"Seven Days" • (featuring George Benson)	Malik Pendleton	—	Share My World	1997	
"Sexy" (featuring Jadakiss)	Mary J. Blige; Aaron Phillips; Kiyamma Griffin; Jadakiss	"I Can't Help It" by Stevie Wonder (Stevie Wonder, Susaye Greene)	Mary	1999	
"Shake Down" (featuring Usher)	Mary J. Blige (Lyrics and Melody); Terius Nash (Lyrics and Melody); Usher Raymond (Lyrics and Melody); Christopher Stewart (Music); Phalon Alexander (Music)	—	Growing Pains	2007	
"Share My World"	Mary J. Blige; Rodney Jerkins	—	Share My World	1997	
"Show Love"	Mary J. Blige; Sean Garrett; Chucky Thompson	—	The Breakthrough (Vinyl, iTunes, U.K. and Japanese editions)	2005	
"Silent Night"	Traditional	—	A Mary Christmas (Target edition)	2012	
"Sincerity" (featuring Nas and DMX)	Kenny Kornegay; Mary J. Blige; Earl Simmons; Nasir Jones	"Nautilus" by Bob James (Bob James)	Mary (U.S. Limited Edition) and "Deep Inside" (UK CD2)	1999	
"Sleep Walkin'"	Mary J. Blige; Christopher Stewart	—	Growing Pains (Japanese edition)	2007	
"Slow Down"	Mark C. Rooney; Mark Morales; Joseph E. Keeley	—	What's the 411?	1992	
"Smile" (featuring Prince Charlez)	Mary J. Blige; Theron Feemster; Charles Hinshaw Jr.	—	Strength of a Woman	2017	
"Smoke"	Shaffer Smith (Lyrics); Reggie Perry	—	Growing Pains	2007	
"So Lady" (featuring Raphael Saadiq)	Mary J. Blige; Raphael Saadiq; Teedra Moses	—	The Breakthrough (International editions)	2005	
"Someone to Love Me (Naked)" • (featuring Diddy and Lil Wayne)	Mary J. Blige; Jerry Duplessis; Sean Combs; Leroy Watson; Dwayne Carter; Tony Williams	"You Roam When You Don't Get It at Home" by The Sweet Inspirations (Bettye Crutcher, David Porter and Ronnie Williams)	My Life II... The Journey Continues (Act 1) (U.S. Deluxe, U.K. Deluxe and Japanese editions)	2011	
"Special Part of Me"	Mary J. Blige; Sean Combs; Mario Winans	—	Love & Life	2003	
"Stairway to Heaven" (Led Zeppelin cover) (featuring Travis Barker, Randy Jackson, Steve Vai and Orianthi)	Jimmy Page; Robert Plant	—	Stronger with Each Tear (Reissue releases only)	2010	
"Stay"	Mary J. Blige; Ester Dean; Traci Hale	—	Stronger with Each Tear (U.S. Amazon.com MP3 download edition)	2009	
"Stay Down" •	Mary J. Blige; Bryan-Michael Cox; Johnta Austin	—	Growing Pains	2007	
"Steal Away" (featuring Pharrell)	Mary J. Blige; Pharrell Williams	—	No More Drama	2001	
"Strength of a Woman"	Mary J. Blige; Brandon Hodge; Benjamin Wright; Davion Farris; Eric Dawkins	—	Strength of a Woman	2017	
"Stronger" •	Ester Dean; Chris Brown; Chauncy Hollis; Jamal Jones; Darnell Dalton	—	More than a Game (Soundtrack) and Stronger with Each Tear (Reissue releases only)	2009	
"Suitcase" •	Mark J. Feist; Crystal Nicole; Adrian Sotomayor	—	Think Like a Man Too	2014	
"Superpowers"	Mary J. Blige; Nija Charles; Kevin Ekofo; Jay Gogna; Makeba Riddick-Woods; Shaun Thomas; Tre'Von Waters	—	Gratitude	2024	
"Survivor"	Brandon Hodge; William Tyler; Davion Farris; Dave Hoddell; Spike Hoddell	—	Strength of a Woman	2017	
"Sweet Thing" • (Rufus cover)	Tony Maiden; Chaka Khan	—	What's the 411?	1992	
"Take Me as I Am" •	Jason Suecof; Ezekiel Lewis; Candice Nelson; Keri Hilson; Thabiso Nkhereanye	"A Garden of Peace" by Lonnie Liston Smith (Lonnie Liston Smith)	The Breakthrough	2005	
"Talk to Me"	Mary J. Blige; Eric Hudson; Johnta Austin	"Key to the Heart" by The Emotions (Robert Wright and Verdine White)	Growing Pains	2007	
"Telling the Truth" (featuring Kaytranada)	Mary J. Blige; Louis Celestin; Ashton Simmonds; Matthew Tavares; Chestor Hansen; Alexander Sowinski	—	Strength of a Woman	2017	
"Testimony"	Mary J. Blige; Kenny Dickerson; Michelle Bell	—	No More Drama	2001	
"Thank You"	Mary J. Blige; Darhyl Camper Jr. Jazmine Sullivan	—	Strength of a Woman	2017	
"The Christmas Song (Chesnuts Roasting on an Open Fire)"	Robert Wells; Mel Tormé	—	A Mary Christmas	2012	
"The First Noel" (featuring The Clark Sisters)	Traditional	—	A Mary Christmas	2012	
"The Living Proof" •	Mary J. Blige; Thomas Newman; Harvey Mason; Damon Thomas	—	The Help (Soundtrack) and My Life II... The Journey Continues (Act 1)	2011	
"The Love I Never Had"	James Harris III; Terry Lewis; James Wright; Mary J. Blige	—	Mary	1999	
"The Naked Truth"	Mary J. Blige; Brandon Hodge	—	Strength of a Woman (Target edition)	2017	
"The One" • (featuring Drake)	Mary J. Blige; Rodney Jerkins; Ester Dean; Aubrey Graham	—	Stronger with Each Tear	2009	
"Therapy" •	Mary J. Blige; Sam Smith; Francis Anthony White	—	The London Sessions	2014	
"Thick of It" •	Mary J. Blige; Darhyl Camper; Jazmine Sullivan	"Give a Little Love" by Bay City Rollers (Phil Wainman and John Goddison)	Strength of a Woman	2017	
"This Christmas" • (Donny Hathaway cover)	Donny Hathaway; Nadine McKinnor	—	A Mary Christmas	2012	
"This Love is for You"	Mary J. Blige; Ester Dean; Christopher "Tricky" Stewart	—	My Life II... The Journey Continues (Act 1) (U.K. Deluxe and Japanese editions)	2011	
"Thriving" • (featuring Nas)	Mary J. Blige; Denisia Andrews; Darhyl Camper Jr. Brittany Coney; Nasir Jones	—	Non-album single	2019	
"Till the Morning"	Pharrell Williams	—	Growing Pains	2007	
"Time"	Mary J. Blige; Chucky Thompson	"Pastime Paradise" by Stevie Wonder (Stevie Wonder) "I'm Glad You're Mine" by Al Green (Al Green) "Time is Not on Our Side" by Al Green (Al Green)	Mary	1999	
"Tonight"	Mary J. Blige; Andrew Harr; Jermaine Jackson; Kevin Cossom; Akon	"Rapper Dapper Snapper" by Edwin Birdsong (Edwin Birdsong)	Stronger with Each Tear	2009	
"Tough Love" (featuring Moneybagg Yo)	Mary J. Blige; Charles A. Hinshaw; Cynthia De Mari Biggs; D'Mile; Dexter Wansel; DJ Cassidy	—	Good Morning Gorgeous (Deluxe Edition)	2022	
"U + Me (Love Lesson)" •	Mary J. Blige; Brandon Hodge; Charles Hinshaw Jr. David D. Brown	—	Strength of a Woman	2017	
"Ultimate Relationship (A.M.)"	Donald Lawrence; Steve White	—	Love & Life	2003	
"Vegas Nights" (featuring The-Dream)	Mary J. Blige; Terius Nash; Christopher Stewart	—	Think Like a Man Too	2014	
"We Got Hood Love" (Note: Known as "Hood Love" on some editions of the album.) • (featuring Trey Songz)	Mary J. Blige; Bryan-Michael Cox; Johnta Austin; Kendrick Dean	—	Stronger with Each Tear (Original 2009 release only)	2009	
"We Ride (I See the Future)" •	Mary J. Blige; Bryan-Michael Cox; Kendrick Dean; Johnta Austin	—	Reflections (A Retrospective)	2006	
"What Love Is"	Mary J. Blige; Mikkel S. Eriksen; Tor Erik Hermansen; Shaffer Smith (Lyrics)	—	Growing Pains	2007	
"What's the 411?" (featuring Grand Puba)	Maxwell Dixon; Tony Dofat	"Pride and Vanity" by Ohio Players (Marvin R. Pierce, Gregory A. Webster, Norman Napier, Ralph Middlebrooks, Leroy Bonner, Marshall Jones, Andrew Noland, Walter Morrison) "Very Special" by Debra Laws (William Jeffery)	What's the 411?	1992	
"When We"	Mary J. Blige; Mechalie Jamison; Andy Craemer; Mario Winans; Sean Combs	"I Want You" by Marvin Gaye (Arthur "T-Boy" Ross, Leon Ware)	Love & Life	2003	
"When You Wish Upon a Star" (featuring Barbra Streisand and Chris Botti) (Cliff Edwards cover)	Leigh Harline; Ned Washington	—	A Mary Christmas	2012	
"When You're Gone"	Mary J. Blige; James Napier; Francis Anthony White	—	The London Sessions	2014	
"Whenever I Say Your Name" • (Duet with Sting)	Sting	—	Sacred Love and Love & Life (UK Reissue and Japanese Tour Edition) (Note: Also appears on the compilation album Mary J. Blige & Friends.)	2003	
"Where I've Been" (featuring Eve)	Mary J. Blige; Eve; Swizz Beatz	—	No More Drama	2001	
"Whole Damn Year" •	Mary J. Blige; Emeli Sandé; Knox Brown	—	The London Sessions	2014	
"Whole Lotta Love" (Led Zeppelin cover)	Jimmy Page; Robert Plant; John Bonham; John Paul Jones; Willie Dixon	—	Stronger with Each Tear (Reissue releases only)	2010	
"Why" • (featuring Rick Ross)	Mary J. Blige; Dave Young; Eric Hudson; William Roberts II	—	My Life II... The Journey Continues (Act 1)	2011	
"Willing & Waiting"	Mary J. Blige; Mechalie Jamison; Andy Creamer	"When Love Calls" by Atlantic Starr (David Lewis, Wayne Lewis)	Love & Life	2003	
"Winter Wonderland"	Felix Bernard; Richard Bernhard Smith	—	A Mary Christmas (Target edition)	2012	
"Wonderful"	Priscilla Renea Hamilton; Mary J. Blige; LaShawn Daniels; Ronald "Flippa" Colson; Warren "Oak" Felder; Andrew "Pop" Wansel; Stephen Mostyn; Raysean Hairston	"Push It Along" by A Tribe Called Quest (Kamaal Fareed Ali, Ali Shaheed Muhammad and Grover Washington Jr.)	Think Like a Man Too	2014	
"Work in Progress (Growing Pains)"	Charles Harmony; Shaffer Smith (Lyrics)	—	Growing Pains	2007	
"Work That" •	Mary J. Blige; Theron Feemster; Sean Garrett	—	Growing Pains	2007	
"Worth My Time"	Mary J. Blige; James Napier	—	The London Sessions	2014	
"You Ain't the Only One"	Mary J. Blige; Bryan Jones; Patrick Kelly; Angelo Velasquez	—	Gratitude	2024	
"You Bring Me Joy" •	Mary J. Blige; Jo-Jo Hailey	"It's Ecstasy When You Lay Down Next to Me" by Barry White (Ekundayo Paris, Nelson Pigford)	My Life	1994	
"You Don't Have to Worry" •	Kenneth "G-Love" Greene; Edward "DJ Eddie F" Ferrell	"Papa Don't Take No Mess" by James Brown (James Brown, Fred Wesley, John Starks, Charles Bobbit)	Who's That Man? (Note: A remixed version appears on the album What's the 411? Remix) (Soundtrack)	1993	
"You Gotta Believe"	Mary J. Blige; Big Bub; Faith Evans; K-Ci Hailey; Chucky Thompson; Sean "Puffy" Combs	—	My Life	1994	
"You Know"	Mary J. Blige; Sean Garrett; Eric Hudson	—	Reflections (A Retrospective)	2006	
"(You Make Me Feel Like) A Natural Woman" • (Aretha Franklin cover)	Gerry Goffin; Carole King; Jerry Wexler	—	My Life (European 1995 Reissue & 2019 25th Anniversary Edition); Share My World (UK and Japanese Editions)	1995	
"You Remind Me" •	Eric Milteer; Dave "Jam" Hall	"Remind Me" by Patrice Rushen (Patrice Rushen)	What's the 411?	1992	
"You Want This"	Mary J. Blige; Harvey Mason; Damon Thomas; Eric Dawkins; Dewain Whitmore Jr. Joi Campbell; Adonis Shropshire; Kevin Randolph	—	My Life II... The Journey Continues (Act 1) (U.K. Deluxe and Japanese editions)	2011	
"Your Child" •	Gerald Isaac	—	Mary	1999	
