= Share My World Tour =

1997–98 concert tour by Mary J. Blige

- Tour by Mary J. Blige
- Location: United States; Europe
- Associated album: Share My World
- Start date: September 2, 1997
- End date: May 3, 1998
- No. of shows: 27

Mary J. Blige concert chronology
- Share My World Tour (1997–98); The Mary Show Tour (2000)

The Share My World Tour was the first headlining concert tour by American recording artist Mary J. Blige. It was launched in support of her multi-platinum third studio album Share My World (1997), and also contained material from her first and second studio albums What's the 411? (1992) and My Life (1994). The eight-month tour began on September 2, 1997, in the United States and continued through May 3, 1998. Concerts were held in North America and Europe.

== Opening acts ==
- Usher

== Set list ==
This set list is from the Los Angeles show on April 11, 1998. It does not represent the setlist of the entire tour.

1. "Announcer" (intro)
2. "Real Love"
3. "You Remind Me"
4. "Reminisce" (Remix)
5. "Sweet Thing"
6. "Mary Jane (All Night Long)"
7. "Love No Limit" (Remix)
8. "Summer Madness" (interlude)
9. "My Life"
10. "You Gotta Believe"
11. "Slow Down"
12. "Mary's Joint"
13. "I'm the Only Woman"
14. "Share My World" (interlude)
15. "I’m Goin’ Down"
16. "Thank You Lord" (interlude)
17. "I Can Love You"
18. "Keep Your Head" (Interlude)
19. "Everything"
20. "Seven Days"
21. "Not Gon' Cry"
22. "Missing You"
23. "Day Dreaming"
24. "Misty Blue"

Notes

- "Everyday It Rains", "I Love You", "You Bring Me Joy", and "Be Happy" were performed from August 28 to November 17, 1997.
- "Slow Down", "Mary's Joint", "I'm the Only Woman", "Missing You", "Day Dreaming", and "Misty Blue" were only performed in 1998.

== Band ==
- Music Director/Bass: Lanar "Kern" Brantley
- Keyboards: Luke Austin
- Keyboards: Jeff Motley
- Drums: Michael Clemons
- Keyboards: Loren Dawson
- Intro Announcer: Benny Pough
- Background vocals: Dustin Adams, Joya Owens, Chantell Jones, Michelle Matlock
  Additional vocals: Cindy Mizelle, Sharon Bryant-Gallwey, Audrey Wheeler, Paulette McWilliams

== Tour dates ==
List of concerts, showing date, city, country and venue
Date	City	Country	Venue
North America (Note: Part of Budweiser Superfest.)
August 28, 1997	Buffalo	United States	Marine Midland Arena
August 29, 1997	Cleveland	United States	Gund Arena
August 30, 1997	Philadelphia	United States	CoreStates Center
September 1, 1997	Charlotte	United States	Charlotte Coliseum
September 2, 1997	Memphis	United States	Pyramid Arena
September 3, 1997	Indianapolis	United States	Market Square Arena
September 4, 1997	Nashville	United States	Nashville Arena
September 5, 1997	Auburn Hills	United States	The Palace of Auburn Hills
September 6, 1997	Chicago	United States	United Center
September 7, 1997	Dayton	United States	UD Arena
September 10, 1997	Atlanta	United States	Lakewood Amphitheatre
September 11, 1997	Baltimore	United States	Baltimore Arena
September 12, 1997	New York City	United States	Madison Square Garden
September 13, 1997	Hartford	United States	Hartford Civic Center
September 14, 1997	Worcester	United States	Worcester's Centrum Centre
September 17, 1997	Pittsburgh	United States	Civic Arena
September 18, 1997	Hampton	United States	Hampton Coliseum
September 19, 1997	Greensboro	United States	Greensboro Coliseum
September 20, 1997	Orlando	United States	Orlando Arena
September 21, 1997	Miami	United States	Miami Arena
September 23, 1997	Oklahoma City	United States	Myriad Arena
September 24, 1997	Denver	United States	McNichols Sports Arena
September 26, 1997	Houston	United States	The Summit
September 27, 1997	St. Louis	United States	Kiel Center
September 28, 1997	Dallas	United States	Starplex Amphitheater
October 1, 1997	Seattle	United States	KeyArena
October 2, 1997	Sacramento	United States	ARCO Arena
October 3, 1997	San Jose	United States	San Jose Arena
October 4, 1997	Inglewood	United States	Great Western Forum
October 5, 1997	Phoenix	United States	Arizona Veterans Memorial Coliseum
October 6, 1997	San Diego	United States	Cox Arena at Aztec Bowl
Europe
November 2, 1997	Brussels	Belgium	Ancienne Belgique
November 5, 1997	Zürich	Switzerland	El Cubanito
November 9, 1997	Hamburg	Germany	CCH-Saal 3
November 11, 1997	Sheffield	England	Sheffield Arena
November 12, 1997	London	England	Wembley Arena
November 13, 1997	London	England	Wembley Arena
November 14, 1997	Manchester	England	NYNEX Arena
November 17, 1997	Rotterdam	Netherlands	Ahoy
North America
March 25, 1998	Detroit	United States	Fox Theatre
March 26, 1998	Detroit	United States	Fox Theatre
March 27, 1998	Chicago	United States	Arie Crown Theater
March 28, 1998	Chicago	United States	Arie Crown Theater
March 29, 1998	Atlanta	United States	Fox Theatre
March 30, 1998	Atlanta	United States	Fox Theatre
March 31, 1998	Miami	United States	James L. Knight Center
April 2, 1998	Washington, D.C.	United States	DAR Constitution Hall
April 3, 1998	Washington, D.C.	United States	DAR Constitution Hall
April 4, 1998	New York City	United States	The Theater at Madison Square Garden
April 5, 1998	New York City	United States	The Theater at Madison Square Garden
April 9, 1998	Oakland	United States	Paramount Theatre
April 10, 1998	Oakland	United States	Paramount Theatre
April 11, 1998	Los Angeles	United States	Universal Amphitheatre
April 12, 1998	Los Angeles	United States	Universal Amphitheatre
April 13, 1998	Seattle	United States	Paramount Theatre
April 16, 1998	Pittsburgh	United States	Palumbo Center
April 17, 1998	Richmond	United States	Landmark Theater
April 18, 1998	Philadelphia	United States	Mann Center for the Performing Arts
April 19, 1998	Cleveland	United States	CSU Convocation Center

== Live album ==
The Tour

Live album by Mary J. Blige
- Released: July 28, 1998 (U.S.)
- Recorded: April 11 & 12, 1998
- Venues: Universal Amphitheatre, Universal City, California
- Genres: R&B, Hip-Hop
- Length: 109:18
- Label: MCA
- Producers: Mary J. Blige, Lanar Brantley

Mary J. Blige chronology
Share My World (1997)	The Tour (1998)	Mary (1999)

A live album entitled The Tour was released on July 28, 1998 by MCA Records, which reached No. 7 on Billboard's Top R&B Albums and No. 21 on Billboard 200 charts. The album was recorded during Blige's Share My World Tour at the Universal Amphitheater in Los Angeles, California.

=== Track listing ===
1. "Intro" – 0:35
2. "Real Love" – 1:30
3. "You Remind Me" – 0:37
4. "Reminisce" – 2:39
5. "Sweet Thing" – 4:53
6. "Mary Jane (All Night Long)" – 2:20
7. "Love No Limit" – 3;16
8. "Summer Madness" – 1:42 (Interlude)
9. "My Life" – 2:21
10. "You Gotta Believe" – 2:27
11. "Slow Down" – 1:51
12. "Mary's Joint" – 1:30
13. "I'm the Only Woman" – 2:04
14. "Share My World" – 1:59 (Interlude)
15. "I'm Goin' Down" – 3:16
16. "Thank You Lord" – 1:18 (Interlude)
17. "I Can Love You" – 3:44
18. "Keep Your Head" (Interlude) – 1:10
19. "Everything" – 6:34
20. "Seven Days" – 4:24
21. "Not Gon' Cry" – 5:37
22. "Missing You" – 6:47
23. "Day Dreaming" – 2:49
24. "Misty Blue" – 5:08
25. "A Dream" (Japan Bonus Track)
