= Music Saved My Life Tour =

2010–11 concert tour by Mary J. Blige

- Tour by Mary J. Blige
- Promotional poster for the tour
- Location: North America; Asia; Europe; Australia
- Associated album: Stronger with Each Tear
- Start date: September 6, 2010
- End date: February 8, 2011
- No. of shows: 30

Mary J. Blige concert chronology
- Love Soul Tour (2008); Music Saved My Life Tour (2010–11); The Liberation Tour (2012)

Music Saved My Life Tour was the eighth concert tour by American recording artist, Mary J. Blige. It was launched in support of her ninth studio Stronger with Each Tear (2009). It began in September 2010 and continued through February 2011. Concerts were held in North America, Europe, Asia and Australia.

== Background ==
Universal Music Group announced Blige's tour on September 1, 2010. The tour was described as Blige venturing back to her R&B roots from her previous festival performances, which focused on a heavy rock sound. Blige states the tour's title comes from her personal viewpoint of music after her battles with drug and alcohol abuse. She further commented:

"Music makes us want to live. You don't know how many times people have told me that they'd been down and depressed and just wanted to die. But then a special song caught their ear and that helped give them renewed strength. That's the power music has. I believe there are certain things that God uses to get us out of a bad situation, and I believe music was one of the things he used for me. The first time I heard 'Keep on Moving' by Soul II Soul, I felt like somebody pumped a new spirit in me that made me want to go on. [Without music] I honestly think I would be in a really bad situation. I don't take it for granted. I have no doubt I was born to do this.

== Opening acts ==
- Jazmine Sullivan (North America)
- El DeBarge (North America)
- Miguel (North America)
- Lemar (England)
- Gyptian (England)
- Beatbox Drase (Manchester)
- Minmi (Japan)
- Mye (Japan)

== Set list ==
1. "MJB da MVP"
2. "The One"
3. "Enough Cryin"
4. "You Bring Me Joy"
5. "Be Happy" / "You Remind Me" / "Real Love" / "Everyday It Rains"
6. "I'm The Only Woman"
7. "I Love U (Yes I Du)"
8. "Love Is All We Need"
9. "Reminisce" (contain elements of "They Reminisce Over You (T.R.O.Y.)")
10. "Love No Limit" / "Mary Jane (All Night Long)"
11. "Good Woman Down"
12. "Everything"
13. "All That I Can Say"
14. "I Never Wanna Live Without You"
15. "Seven Days"
16. "Your Child" (contain elements of "The Lady in My Life")
17. "Deep Inside"
18. "I Am"
19. "Sweet Thing"
20. "Not Gon' Cry"
21. "I'm Going Down"
22. "Take Me As I Am" (acoustic)
23. "No More Drama"
24. "I Love You" (instrumental interlude)
25. "I Can Love You" / "Work That"
26. "Just Fine"
27. "Family Affair"

Encore

28. "Be Without You"

=== Additional notes ===
- "I Can Love You", "Work That", "The One", and "Family Affair". were only performed during select dates in North America and Europe.
- During the first concert in New York, Blige performed "I'm Goin' Down" with Katlyn Nichol.
- During the second concert in New York, Blige performed "Fancy" and "Holding You Down (Goin' in Circles)" with Swizz Beatz and Jazmine Sullivan.
- "Stairway to Heaven" was performed during the concert in Basel.

=== Musicians ===
- Mary J. Blige - Main Performer, Vocals
- Omar Edwards - Musical Direction
- Rexsell Hardy - Musical Direction
- Devine Evans - Music Programmer
- Tiffany Bastiani - Vocals (Background)
- Carlos Battery - Vocals (Background)
- Robert "JJ" Smith - Bass
- Rexsell Hardy - Drums
- Jeff Motley - Keyboards
- Luke Austin - Keyboards
- Omar Edwards - Keyboards
- Shawn Hinton - Guitar

== Tour dates ==
List of concerts, showing date, city, country and venue
Date	City	Country	Venue
September 6, 2010^{[A]}	Seattle	U.S.	Memorial Stadium
October 1, 2010^{[B]}	Mobile	U.S.	Miller Lite Stage
October 2, 2010	Atlanta	U.S.	Chastain Park Amphitheater
October 3, 2010	Virginia Beach	U.S.	Virginia Beach Amphitheater
October 7, 2010	Bristow	U.S.	Jiffy Lube Live
October 8, 2010	Atlantic City	U.S.	Borgata Events Center
October 10, 2010	Ledyard	U.S.	MGM Grand at Foxwoods
October 11, 2010	New York City	U.S.	Radio City Music Hall
October 12, 2010	New York City	U.S.	Radio City Music Hall
October 15, 2010	Detroit	U.S.	Fox Theatre
October 16, 2010	St. Louis	U.S.	Fox Theatre
October 17, 2010 (Note: The October 17, 2010 show at Chicago Theater, Chicago was originally set to take place on October 16 before being rescheduled.)	Chicago	U.S.	Chicago Theatre
October 20, 2010	Los Angeles	U.S.	Gibson Amphitheatre
October 21, 2010	Los Angeles	U.S.	Gibson Amphitheatre
October 23, 2010	Concord	U.S.	Sleep Train Pavilion
October 29, 2010	Basel	Switzerland	Messe Basel
October 30, 2010	Basel	Switzerland	Messe Basel
November 2, 2010	London	England	The O_{2} Arena
November 3, 2010	Birmingham	England	LG Arena
November 5, 2010	Manchester	England	Manchester Evening News Arena
January 16, 2011	Seoul	South Korea	Grand Peace Palace
January 19, 2011	Tokyo	Japan	JCB Hall
January 20, 2011	Tokyo	Japan	JCB Hall
January 22, 2011	Osaka	Japan	Namba Hatch
January 26, 2011^{[C]}	Perth	Australia	Fremantle Oval
January 28, 2011^{[C]}	Sydney	Australia	Parramatta Park
January 29, 2011^{[C]} (Note: The January 29, 2011 show at Sidney Myer Music Bowl, Melbourne was originally set to take place on January 28 at Royal Melbourne Showgrounds before being rescheduled.)	Melbourne	Australia	Sidney Myer Music Bowl
January 30, 2011^{[C]} (Note: The January 30, 2011 show at Brisbane Riverstage, Brisbane was originally set to take place on January 29 at Pine River Park before being rescheduled due to the Queensland Floods.)	Brisbane	Australia	Riverstage
February 2, 2011^{[C]} (Note: The February 2, 2011 show at Theabarton Theatre, Adelaide was originally set to take place at Memorial Prive Drive before being rescheduled.)	Adelaide	Australia	Thebarton Theatre
February 5, 2011^{[C]}	Rotorua	New Zealand	Rotorua International Stadium
February 8, 2011	Kuala Lumpur	Malaysia	Plenary Hall

Festivals and other miscellaneous performances
^{A} This concert was a part of 2010 Bumbershoot
^{B} This concert was a part of Bayfest
^{C} These concerts are a part of the Raggamuffin Music Festival

== Cancelled shows ==
List of cancelled concerts, showing date, city, country, and venue
Date	City	Country	Venue
October 5, 2010	Raleigh	U.S.	Raleigh Memorial Auditorium
October 22, 2010	Las Vegas	U.S.	Pearl Concert Theatre
October 26, 2010	Amsterdam	Netherlands	Heineken Music Hall
December 18, 2010	Harare	Zimbabwe	Harare International Conference Centre (Note: Originally set to take place at Jaggers Msasa Warehouse.)
January 30, 2011	Port Macquarie	Australia	Cassegrain Winery
February 3, 2011	Sydney	Australia	Sydney Entertainment Centre

== Box office ==
List of concerts, showing venue, city, attendance and revenue
Venue	City	Attendance (Tickets sold / available)	Gross revenue
Radio City Music Hall	New York City	11,150 / 11,896 (94%)	$1,200,835
Fox Theatre	Detroit	4,091 / 4,260 (96%)	$392,465
Chicago Theatre	Chicago	3,481 / 3,481 (100%)	$330,390
The O_{2} Arena	London	8,148 / 8,148 (100%)	$550,439
Manchester Evening News Arena	Manchester	3,530 / 4,413 (80%)	$245,030
TOTAL		30,400 / 32,198 (94%)	$2,719,159

== Critical reception ==
Overall, the tour received praise from music critics and spectators alike. Blige was noted for her positive messages through her performances encouraging women to believe in themselves and know there is something "better" plan for them. Ines Min (The Korea Times) wrote, "A soulful train of songs, including 'Reminisce', was accompanied by her smooth dancing skills before breaking down the stage with the pique song 'Good Woman Down'. The performer shook, jumped and shimmied in perfect motion, spurring the crowd to rise in an emotional fervor." Anthony Langone (The Depaula) continued the praise for Blige noting, "Never have I seen such a venue this alive. The entire crowd was on its feet singing every word. This is a true testament of Blige's star power. The ability to not only command the stage, but all the people in a sold-out venue is no easy task. Blige did it with ease, making it look easy." Jon Pareles (The New York Times) stated, "In her songs Ms. Blige transmutes setbacks into determination; she confronts trouble, she cries, she wills herself to get over it, she finds the next love. Onstage she's a pop star as life coach, preaching sermons in self-esteem with gospel cadences."
