= Ballads (Mary J. Blige album) =

Compilation album by Mary J. Blige
- Released: December 20, 2000
- Recorded: 1991–2000
- Genre: R&B; hip hop soul
- Label: Universal Music Japan
- Producer: P. Diddy, Babyface

Mary J. Blige chronology
Mary (1999)	Ballads (2000)	No More Drama (2001)

Professional ratings
Review scores
Source	Rating
Allmusic	link

Ballads is a compilation album released on December 20, 2000 by American R&B singer Mary J. Blige. It was released exclusively in Japan, which includes previously unreleased track "Overjoyed", a cover of Stevie Wonder.

== Track listing ==
No.	Title	Album	Length
1.	"Overjoyed"	Conception	3:46
2.	"You Remind Me"	What's the 411?	4:15
3.	"Beautiful"	How Stella Got Her Groove Back	6:29
4.	"Everything"	Share My World	4:58
5.	"Slow Down"	What's the 411?	4:30
6.	"I Never Wanna Live Without You"	My Life	6:12
7.	"Seven Days"	Share My World	5:09
8.	"(You Make Me Feel Like) A Natural Woman"	New York Undercover	2:56
9.	"I Don't Want to Do Anything" (duet with K-Ci Hailey)	Uptown MTV Unplugged	6:00
10.	"Give Me You"	Mary	4:09
11.	"No Happy Holidays"	Mary	5:17
12.	"Your Child"	Mary	5:28
13.	"Missing You"	Share My World	4:17
14.	"I Love You"	My Life	4:29
15.	"Don't Go"	My Life	4:58
16.	"Misty Blue"	The Tour	5:08

== Certifications ==
Certifications for Ballads
Region	Certification	Certified units/sales
Japan (RIAJ)	Gold	100,000^{^}
^{^} Shipments figures based on certification alone.
