= The Tour (album) =

Live album by Mary J. Blige
- Released: July 28, 1998
- Recorded: April 1998
- Venue: Universal Amphitheater in Los Angeles
- Genre: R&B
- Length: 70:31
- Label: MCA
- Producers: Mary J. Blige, Lanar Brantley

Mary J. Blige chronology
Share My World (1997)	The Tour (1998)	Mary (1999)

Professional ratings
Review scores
Source	Rating
AllMusic	3/5 stars
Entertainment Weekly	B+
Los Angeles Times	3/4 stars
Rolling Stone	3/5 stars
The Village Voice	A−

The Tour is a live recording album by American R&B singer Mary J. Blige, released July 28, 1998. The album was recorded from two shows in Los Angeles at the Universal Amphitheater during her Share My World Tour in 1997-1998 in the U.S.

== Critical reception ==
In a contemporary review for Rolling Stone, Jancee Dunn wrote that The Tour "deftly captures the energy and exuberance" of Blige's live shows while calling the singer "a commanding, self-assured performer" who "plays her audience like a damn fiddle". Entertainment Weekly critic Matt Diehl said while the arrangements were occasionally overwrought, Blige compensated with passionate vocals and impressive covers of classic soul songs, "blending motifs into each other like an expert DJ". Robert Christgau deemed the record Blige's "de facto best-of" in The Village Voice; he explained in 2003 why it remained his favorite album of hers:

"Not for its slightly gauche show band, or even for its concentrated song selection and bonus covers. More for its hype man cheerleading like the nameless subaltern he is and the high-pitched cheers he works up; for Mary missing notes, or claiming she's getting fat and then not worrying about it anyway. In this context, deathless nonpoetry like 'I know that I was wrong for all that carrying on/But are you gonna hold it against me?' carries weight."

== Track listing ==
1. "Intro"
2. "Real Love"
3. "You Remind Me"
4. "Reminisce"
5. "Sweet Thing"
6. "Mary Jane (All Night Long)"
7. "Love No Limit"
8. "Summer Madness"
9. "My Life"
10. "You Gotta Believe"
11. "Slow Down"
12. "Mary's Joint"
13. "I'm the Only Woman"
14. "Share My World"
15. "I'm Goin' Down"
16. "Thank You Lord"
17. "I Can Love You"
18. "Keep Your Head" (with Dustin Adams)
19. "Everything"
20. "Seven Days"
21. "Not Gon' Cry"
22. "Missing You"
23. "Day Dreaming"
24. "Misty Blue"
25. "A Dream" (Japanese Bonus Track)

== Personnel ==
=== Musicians ===
- Mary J. Blige - Main Performer, Vocals
- Lanar Brantley - Musical Direction
- Benny Pough - Introduction Announcer
- Dustin Adams - Vocals (Background), Performer
- Paulette McWilliams - Vocals (Background)
- Joya Owens - Vocals (Background)
- Audrey Wheeler - Vocals (Background)
- Angel Rogers - Vocals (Background)
- Sharon Bryant-Gallaway - Vocals (Background)
- Chantell Jones - Vocals (Background)
- Michelle Matlock - Vocals (Background)
- Cindy Mizelle - Vocals (Background)
- Lanar Brantley - Bass
- Michael Clemons - Drums
- Jeff Motley - Keyboards
- Luke Austin - Keyboards
- Loren Dawson - Keyboards
- Devine Evans - Protools (Music Programmer)

=== Production ===
- Mary J. Blige - producer
- Lanar Brantley - producer
- Kirk Burrowes - Executive Producer
- Hank Shocklee - Executive Producer
- LaTonya Blige-DaCosta - Associate Executive Producer
- Lanar Brantley - mixing
- Larry Alexander - mixing
- Hank Shocklee - mixing
- Greg Pinto - Mixing Assistant
- Larry Alexander - sequencing
- Tom Coyne - mastering
- Chuck Orozco - engineering
- Larry Alexander - engineering
- John Protozko - engineering
- Booker T. Jones III - engineering
- Jeff Keese - engineering
- Scott Peets - engineering

== Chart performance ==
Chart (1998)	Peak position
Canada Top Albums/CDs (RPM)	4
US Billboard 200	21

== Certifications ==
Region	Certification	Certified units/sales
United States (RIAA)	Gold	500,000^{^}
^{^} Shipments figures based on certification alone.
