= Mary J. Blige & Friends =

Compilation album by Mary J. Blige
- Released: October 31, 2006
- Genre: R&B; soul
- Label: Geffen

Mary J. Blige chronology
The Breakthrough (2005)	Mary J. Blige & Friends (2006)	Reflections (A Retrospective) (2006)

Mary J. Blige & Friends is a compilation album by American recording artist Mary J. Blige. Released on October 31, 2006 it was sold exclusively in Circuit City stores, and includes tracks featuring guest artists such as Sting, Robin Thicke, and Nas. Also included was a bonus DVD that included a brief career biography, excerpts and behind the scenes views of some of her music videos, interviews with collaborators, and live performances of "Can't Hide from Luv", "Family Affair", and "No More Drama".

== Track listing ==
No.	Title	Writer(s)	Producer(s)	Length
1.	"Whenever I Say Your Name" (with Sting)	Sting, Mary J. Blige	Sting	5:25
2.	"Ask Myself" (with Robin Thicke)	Robin Thicke, Bobby Keyes, Robert Daniels	Robin Thicke, Pro J	3:47
3.	"Ain't No Way" (with Patti LaBelle)	Carolyn Franklin		4:28
4.	"Love Changes" (with Jamie Foxx)	Skip Scarborough		4:30
5.	"Alone" (with Dave Young)	Davel "Bo" McKenzie, Dave Young	Davel "Bo" McKenzie, Dave Young, Mary J. Blige	4:30
6.	"Favorite Flavor" (with LL Cool J)	Ryan Toby, Samuel Barnes	Trackmasters	3:28
7.	"Love Is All We Need" (with Nas)	James Harris III, Terry Lewis, Blige, Rick James	Jimmy Jam & Terry Lewis	4:17
8.	"My Man" (with Santana & Big Boi)	Antwan Patton, Nsilo Reddick, Nicholas Sherwood, Rob Thomas	Big Boi, The Beat Bullies	4:34
9.	"I Guess That's Why They Call It the Blues" (with Elton John)	Elton John, Bernie Taupin, Davey Johnstone		5:09

== Charts ==
Chart (2002–2009)	Peak position
US Billboard 200	95
US Top Catalog Albums (Billboard)	1
US Top R&B/Hip-Hop Albums (Billboard)	8
