= Love Is All We Need =

1997 single by Mary J. Blige

Single by Mary J. Blige

from the album Share My World
- Released: March 12, 1997
- Studio: Flyte Tyme (Edina, Minnesota)
- Length: 4:16
- Label: MCA
- Songwriters: Mary J. Blige; James Harris III; Rick James; Nasir Jones; Terry Lewis
- Producer: Jimmy Jam and Terry Lewis

Mary J. Blige singles chronology
"All That I Got Is You" (1996)	"Love Is All We Need" (1997)	"I Can Love You" (1997)

Nas singles chronology
"Head over Heels" (1997)	"Love Is All We Need" (1997)	"Escobar '97" (1997)

"Love Is All We Need" is a song by American singer Mary J. Blige, with a guest rap from Nas. It was written by Blige, Nas, James Harris III, and Terry Lewis for Blige's third studio album, Share My World (1997), while production was helmed by Jimmy Jam & Terry Lewis. The song contains a sample of the song "Moonchild" (1985) as performed by American singer Rick James. With its more buoyant tone, it stood in conspicuous contrast to much of the more dark-rooted material featured on Blige's earlier albums.

The song was released by MCA Records as the album's lead single and earned generally positive reviews from music critics. It became Blige's second song to reach the top of the US Billboard Dance Club Play chart, and it also peaked with the top five of the UK R&B Singles Chart and within the top 10 of the New Zealand Singles Chart. A remix of "Love Is All We Need" features a separate rap cameo by Foxy Brown and a vocal interpolation of Diana Ross' "Do You Know Where You're Going To (Theme from Mahogany)".

== Background ==
Citing creative differences, Blige and mentor Sean "Diddy" Combs parted ways after the release of her multi-platinum second album My Life (1994). During the production of her next album Share My World, Combs' absence was filled with a bevy of high-profile producers, such as duo Jimmy Jam & Terry Lewis. The end result produced songs that were less entrenched in the hip hop soul of her first two albums, and replaced with a style that was more aligned with R&B, revealing a softer side and noticeably lighter mood of Blige who had made a concerted effort to clean up her life after experiencing clinical depression, while also battling drug and alcohol addiction.

"Love Is All We Need" was one out of three songs that James Harris III and Terry Lewis wrote and produced for the album. In a 1997 interview with Jet magazine, Blige commented on their contribution: "They have this thing where things for the artist. They created Mary songs. We walked into the studio and they had everything that would Mary sing. When I heard "Love Is All We Need, I said, "This is a Mary song"." Harris further elaborated in 2011: "When she came up to Minneapolis to work on songs, we gave her a bunch of things that sounded really different than she was thinking she should sound like [...] So we played her a couple of tracks, and those tracks ended up becoming "Love Is All We Need”" with Nas and "Everything."

== Critical reception ==
Jonathan Bernstein from Entertainment Weekly noted "the exultant way Blige reacts to the whomping drums, vast chorus, and wide-screen production Jimmy Jam and Terry Lewis cook up" on "Love Is All We Need". Pan-European magazine Music & Media stated that here, "Ms. Blige proves that she has matured as an artist to the extent that she now can be regarded as one of the leading artists in the R&B field. This midtempo song is a fine example of this. The icing on the cake is provided by an imaginative rap by Nas and a sample of Rick James' "Moonchild"." Billboard editor Larry Flick called "Love Is All We Need" a "hit-bound jam that, once again, elevates [Blige] miles above the ever-growing pack of wannabes gunning for her throne."

Music Week rated the song three out of five, describing it as a "lively, funky track featuring rapper Nas and a tasty Rick James sample." A reviewer from People Magazine viewed it as "brilliantly produced" and "a muscular ode to the power of commitment." The reviewer added, "With rapper Nas adding encouragement, Mary J. dives deep into the song’s dense grooves with a tone that’s alternately raw and rugged and then as clear as a spring day. Like much of this excellent CD, it’s a perfect blend of attitude and straight-up skill." Alexis Petridis, writing for The Guardian, remarked: "A booming, dense production by Jam & Lewis, a feature from Nas in his imperial phase [...] a killer hook, Blige on commanding form. Even here, delivering a buoyant paean to lasting romance, there is a raw power and attitude to her voice that sets her apart."

== Chart performance ==
Blige debuted "Love Is All We Need" at the 1997 Soul Train Music Awards on March 7, 1997. The song was issued to radio and video outlets on March 12. While well-received as an airplay single on US radios, "Love Is All We Need" was never given a physical release by MCA Records and as a result, it never charted on the US Billboard Hot 100 singles chart, though it did reach number one on the US Dance Club Songs chart, becoming Blige's second song to do so after 1995's "You Bring Me Joy." Meanwhile, "Love Is All We Need" became an international hit, reaching number seven on the New Zealand Singles Chart and number 15 in the United Kingdom, where it became Blige's first top twenty hit on the UK Singles Chart since 1995's "Mary Jane (All Night Long)." The song also reached number four on the UK R&B Singles chart.

== Music video ==
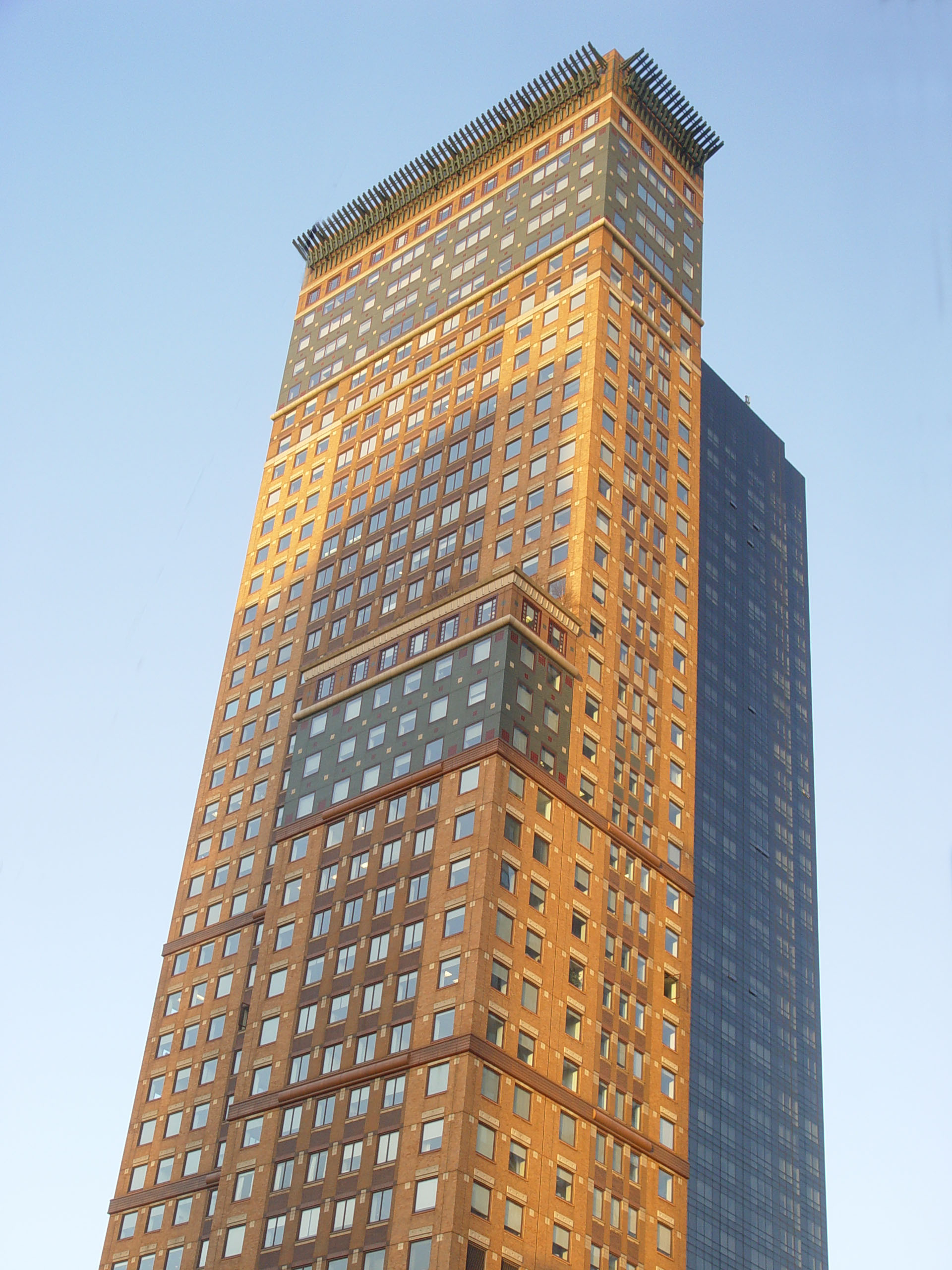
Portions of the visuals for "Love Is All We Need" were filmed at the roof of the Carnegie Hall Tower.

The accompanying music video for "Love Is All We Need" was directed by Paul Hunter and shot in New York City on February 24–25, 1997. The visual open with an aerial shot of a city apartment block. Blige leaves a car and goes into an apartment building with a little girl. She goes through her apartment and later sings as she sits in a chair and stands on a staircase, before appearing at a fashion show. Nas is in a fancy chair rapping his verse. The final scene shows Blige on top of the Carnegie Hall Tower.

== Track listings ==
UK cassette single

1. "Love Is All We Need" – 4:18
2. "Love Is All We Need" (Cutfather & Joe Remix)^{[d]} – 4:16

UK CD single 1

1. "Love Is All We Need" – 4:18
2. "Love Is All We Need" (Instant Flava Remix)^{[a]} – 4:59
3. "Love Is All We Need" (Mark!s Needy Vocal)^{[b]} – 9:20
4. "Love Is All We Need" (D.Y.M.K. Club Mix)^{[c]} – 6:40

UK CD single 2

1. "Love Is All We Need" (Cutfather & Joe Remix)^{[d]} – 4:16
2. "Love Is All We Need" (Cutfather & Joe Stripped Down Mix)^{[d]} – 4:15
3. "Love Is All We Need" (Elusive Club Mix)^{[c]} – 8:15
4. "Love Is All We Need" (Mark!s Faster Mary Faster Dub)^{[b]} – 11:41
5. "Love Is All We Need" (Hard On Dub)^{[c]} – 6:53

UK 12-inch single

1. "Love Is All We Need" – 4:18
2. "Love Is All We Need" (Mark!s Needy Vocal)^{[b]} – 9:20
3. "Love Is All We Need" (Instant Flava Remix)^{[a]} – 4:59
4. "Love Is All We Need" (Elusive Club Mix)^{[c]} – 8:15

Japanese CD single

1. "Love Is All We Need" – 4:18
2. "You Bring Me Joy" – 4:14
3. "Love Is All We Need" (Instrumental) – 4:18

Notes

- ^{^[a]} Remixed by Matt Ward and Dean Gillard.
- ^{^[b]} Remixed by Mark Picchiotti.
- ^{^[c]} Remixed by Boris Dlugosch and Michi Lange.
- ^{^[d]} Remixed by Cutfather & Joe.

Sample credits

- "Love Is All We Need" contains a contains a sample from "Moonchild" as written and performed by Rick James.

== Personnel ==
Personnel are adapted from the Share My World liner notes.

- Mary J. Blige – lead vocals, background vocals
- LaTonya Blige-DaCosta – background vocals
- Nas – additional vocals
- Jimmy Jam & Terry Lewis – production

== Charts ==
=== Weekly charts ===
Weekly chart performance for "Love Is All We Need"
Chart (1997)	Peak position
Europe (Eurochart Hot 100)	98
Israel (Israeli Singles Chart)	20
Netherlands (Single Top 100)	90
New Zealand (Recorded Music NZ)	7
Scottish Singles Sales (Official Charts)	49
Sweden (Sverigetopplistan)	31
UK Singles (Official Charts)	15
UK Hip Hop/R&B (Official Charts)	4
US Radio Songs (Billboard)	43
US Dance Club Songs (Billboard)	1
US Dance Singles Sales (Billboard) with "I Can Love You"	9
US Hot R&B/Hip-Hop Songs (Billboard) with "I Can Love You"	2
US Rhythmic Airplay (Billboard)	11

=== Year-end charts ===
Year-end chart performance for "Love Is All We Need"
Chart (1997)	Position
UK Urban (Music Week)	2
US Hot R&B Singles (Billboard)	31
US Rhythmic Top 40 (Billboard)	55

== Release history ==
Release dates and formats for "Love Is All We Need"
Region	Date	Format(s)	Label(s)	Ref.
United States	March 12, 1997	Radio	MCA	
Japan	March 29, 1997	CD	MCA	
United States	April 15, 1997	Contemporary hit radio	MCA	
United Kingdom	May 5, 1997	CD; cassette	MCA	
United Kingdom	May 12, 1997	12-inch vinyl	MCA	
