= Prince Charles Alexander =

American musician and record producer (born 1958)

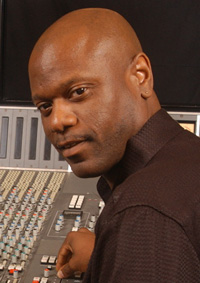

Background information
- Born: April 2, 1958 (age 68); Boston, Massachusetts, United States
- Occupations: Record producer, audio engineer

Charles Alexander (born April 2, 1958), known professionally as Prince Charles Alexander, is an American record producer, audio engineer and professor of music. He received a Grammy for Best Contemporary Soul Gospel Album in 2003.

== Early life and career ==
Alexander was born in Boston and is a graduate of Boston Latin School. He holds an M.S. from Northeastern University and a B.A. from Brandeis University.

Alexander fronted "Prince Charles and the City Beat Band" as the lead singer and multi-instrumentalist, with a focus on the wind synthesizer called the "Lyricon" in recordings and in live performances. Along with manager and Executive Producer Tony Rose (Solid Platinum Records & Productions) Prince Charles recorded and co-produced three albums, "Gang War", "Stone Killers", and "Combat Zone" on Virgin Records from the early to mid-1980s.

== Production and engineering career ==
Alexander disbanded his funk group in the mid-1980s and began focusing on audio engineering. After the switch, he became a multi-platinum recording engineer, mixing engineer and producer for clients that include Mary J. Blige, Puff Daddy, Usher, Boyz II Men, Jodeci, X-Clan, Brandy, Babyface, Sting and Aretha Franklin. He mixed and recorded the Notorious B.I.G.'s One More Chance at The Hit Factory. Alexander earned more than 40 Platinum and Gold certifications from the RIAA and won a Grammy for Best Contemporary Soul Gospel Album in 2003.

Alexander is a Professor in the Music Production & Engineering Department at Berklee College of Music in Boston, Massachusetts. He simultaneously held an Adjunct Instructor position at NYU's Clive Davis Institute of Recorded Music, teaching Music Production from 2006 to 2014. In 2006, Alexander also taught Audio Technology at the Institute of Audio Research in NYC. He has lectured at the City College of New York in Manhattan, the University of Oslo in Oslo, Norway, and the Cape Town Academy at Stellenbosch University in Cape Town, South Africa. He is a member of the Producers and Engineers Wing of the Grammy Committee Board of Governors, the Audio Engineering Society (AES) and the Musician's Union Local 802 in New York City.

He is author of Hip-Hop Production: Inside the Beats (Berklee Press, 2022), a book about the technological history of hip-hop. In November 2023, the Africana Studies Division at Berklee College of Music inducted Prince Charles Alexander into the Berklee Hip-Hop Hall of Fame.

== Personal life ==
Alexander was raised Catholic.
