= My Life (Mary J. Blige album) =

Studio album by Mary J. Blige
- Released: November 29, 1994
- Recorded: December 1993–September 1994
- Studios: Axis Studios Recording; Clinton Recording Studios; Daddy's House; The Hit Factory; Sound on Sound Recordings (New York City)
- Genre: R&B
- Length: 64:59
- Labels: Uptown; MCA
- Producers: Sean "Puffy" Combs; Chucky Thompson; Nashiem Myrick; Dalvin DeGrate; Herb Middleton; Prince Charles Alexander; Poke

Mary J. Blige chronology
| What's the 411? Remix (1993) | My Life (1994) | Share My World (1997) |

Singles from My Life
- 1. "Be Happy" Released: October 26, 1994; 2. "I'm Goin' Down" Released: January 18, 1995; 3. "Mary Jane (All Night Long)" Released: February 8, 1995; 4. "You Bring Me Joy" Released: May 23, 1995; 5. "I Love You" Released: May 28, 1995

My Life is the second album by American R&B recording artist Mary J. Blige, released on November 29, 1994, by Uptown Records and MCA Records. Many of the topics on My Life deal with clinical depression, Blige's battling with both drugs and alcohol, as well as being in an abusive relationship. Unlike her debut, What's the 411? (1992), Blige contributed lyrics to fourteen of the album's tracks, making it her most introspective and personal album at the time. Similar to her debut album, My Life features extensive production from Sean "Puffy" Combs for his newly founded label, Bad Boy Entertainment, which was at the time backed by Arista Records.

Considered to be her breakthrough album, My Life became Mary J. Blige's second album to reach the top ten on the Billboard 200 chart, peaking at number seven, and debuting at number one on the Top R&B/Hip-Hop Albums chart, where it stayed for eight weeks. In 1996, the album was nominated for Best R&B Album at the 38th Grammy Awards, while in December of the same year, the album was certified triple platinum by the Recording Industry Association of America, for shipments of three million copies in the United States. It also won the 1995 Billboard Music Award for Top R&B Album. A special commemorative edition of the album was released on November 20, 2020. In 2025, the album was selected by the Library of Congress to be inducted into the National Recording Registry.

== Background ==
Following the success of her debut album, What's the 411?, and a remixed version in 1993, Blige went into the recording studio in the winter of 1993 to record her second album, My Life. Producer Chucky Thompson was brought in and had originally been contracted to produce one song and an interlude for the project. He ended up being a last minute replacement as the producers Blige worked with previously on What's the 411? demanded more money when the album was certified triple platinum. Blige loved the one song Thompson produced for her, which made Combs change the direction of the album.

Combs called recording engineer Prince Charles Alexander out of the blue after Jodeci went to record Diary of a Mad Band. Alexander was brought in at the end of the record, after working on albums by other artists on Bad Boy Entertainment, such as Total, The Notorious B.I.G. and 112. In the middle of recording My Life, Combs suggested covering Rose Royce's 1977 hit "I'm Going Down", which he wanted Alexander to handle the session. However, the two butted heads over production credit issues, as Combs wanted to give credit to himself and Thompson, although neither were present for the song's recording session. Alexander fought hard to seek production credit from Combs and the two battled it out over the phone over the issue. Combs later explained it was due to receiving a flat royalty rate for producing the majority of the songs and Alexander's production credit would have interfered with the royalty rate. To circumvent this issue, Alexander insisted on having two more sessions with Bad Boy acts. One of the other songs he produced was another Rose Royce cover – "Love Don't Live Here Anymore" for Faith Evans' 1995 debut Faith. Alexander was later called back in to do some mixing and recording.

On the song "K. Murray Interlude", it originally featured The Notorious B.I.G.. He was taken off due to the song's lyrical content, which would have forced Uptown Records to release the album with a Parental Advisory sticker. Rapper Keith Murray was the replacement, while The Notorious B.I.G.'s verse would be released as the song "Who Shot Ya".

The album was a breakthrough for Blige, who at this point was in a clinical depression, battling both drugs and alcohol as well as being in an abusive relationship with singer K-Ci Hailey. In this period, Blige would once again dominate the charts with her singles: the Top 40 hit "Be Happy", a cover version of "I'm Goin' Down" and "You Bring Me Joy". The album uses primary soul samples from R&B musicians such as Curtis Mayfield, Roy Ayers, Al Green, Teddy Pendergrass, Marvin Gaye, Barry White, Rick James, and his protégés, the Mary Jane Girls.

== Critical reception ==
Professional ratings
Initial reviews (in 1994)
Review scores
| Source | Rating |
|---|---|
| Cash Box | (favorable) |
| Chicago Tribune | 3/4 stars |
| Entertainment Weekly | B |
| The Guardian | 3/4 stars |
| Knoxville News Sentinel | 2.5/5 stars |
| Los Angeles Times | 1.5/4 stars |
| Music Week | 4/5 stars |
| NME | 7/10 |
| The Philadelphia Inquirer | 3.5/4 stars |

Professional ratings
Retrospective reviews (after 1994)
Review scores
| Source | Rating |
|---|---|
| AllMusic | 4/5 stars |
| Mojo | 4/5 stars |
| Pitchfork | 7.0/10 |
| The Rolling Stone Album Guide | 3.5/5 stars |

NME wrote that the beats "reign supreme" and commended Blige for "telling her audience she grew up the same way they did, listened to the same things, was influenced by the same situations." Village Voice critic Robert Christgau gave it a three-star honorable mention, indicating "an enjoyable effort consumers attuned to its overriding aesthetic or individual vision may well treasure". He cited "Mary Jane" and "I'm Going Down" as highlights while calling the album "an around-the-way girl's recipe for happiness". In a mixed review, Jonathan Bernstein of Spin found most of the songs too "ordinary" and felt that Blige's compositions "give her space to stretch out and emote, but for all the melody they possess they might as well be breathing exercises." Connie Johnson was more critical in the Los Angeles Times, finding it "drab" and devoid of attitude from Blige, who "doesn't add her own hard-core signature to any significant degree".

In 2002, My Life was ranked number 57 on Blender's list of the 100 greatest American albums of all time. The following year, Rolling Stone placed it at number 279 on their 500 Greatest Albums of All Time, 281 on a 2012 revised list, and 126 on a 2020 list. In 2006, the record was included in Time's 100 greatest albums of all-time list. Most recently, the album was recognized by Apple Music as the 86th best album of all time in 2024 on the Apple Music 100 Best Albums list.

== Accolades ==
| Publication | Country | Accolade | Year | Rank |
|---|---|---|---|---|
| Apple Music | United States | Apple Music 100 Best Albums | 2024 | 86 |
| Blender | United States | The 100 Greatest American Albums of All time | 2002 | 57 |
| Entertainment Weekly | United States | The 100 Best Albums of the Last 25 Years | 2008 | 70 |
| Rolling Stone | United States | The Essential Recordings of the 90s | 1999 | * |
| Rolling Stone | United States | Women in Rock: The 50 Essential Albums | 2002 | 17 |
| Rolling Stone | United States | The 100 Greatest Albums of the 90s | 2010 | 63 |
| Rolling Stone | United States | The 500 Greatest Albums of All Time | 2003 | 279 |
| Rolling Stone | United States | The 500 Greatest Albums of All Time | 2012 | 281 |
| Rolling Stone | United States | The 500 Greatest Albums of All Time | 2020 | 126 |
| TIME | United States | Top 100 Albums of All Time | 2006 | * |
| Vibe | United States | 100 Essential Albums of the 20th Century | 1999 | * |
| Vibe | United States | 150 Albums That Define the Vibe Era (1992–2007) | 2007 | * |
| The Rough Guide | United States | Soul: 100 Essential CDs | 2000 | * |
| The New Nation | United Kingdom | Top 100 Albums by Black Artists | | 38 |
| FNAC | France | The 1000 Best Albums of All Time | 2008 | 862 |

== Commercial performance ==
My Life debuted at number nine on the US Billboard 200 chart, and eventually peaked at number seven. The album also debuted at number one on the US Top R&B/Hip-Hop Albums chart and it spent a total of eight weeks at the top of that chart. The album would ultimately go on to spend 46 weeks on the Billboard 200 Albums Chart and 84 weeks on the Top R&B/Hip-Hop Albums chart. The album also charted in Canada peaking at number 37 on the Canadian Albums Chart, and at number 59 on the UK Albums Chart. On December 13, 1995, My Life was certified triple platinum by the Recording Industry Association of America (RIAA), for shipments of three million copies in the United States. As of December 2009, the album has sold 2.8 million copies in the US.

== Track listing ==
Unless otherwise indicated, Information is taken from the Album's Liner Notes.

| No. | Title | Writer(s) | Producer(s) | Length |
|---|---|---|---|---|
| 1. | "Intro" | Mary J. Blige | Chucky Thompson; Sean "Puffy" Combs | 1:04 |
| 2. | "Mary Jane (All Night Long)" | Rick James; Blige | Thompson; Combs | 4:39 |
| 3. | "You Bring Me Joy" | Blige; Joel "JoJo" Hailey | Thompson (music); Combs (music); Hailey (vocals) | 4:13 |
| 4. | "Marvin Interlude" | Blige | Thompson; Combs | 0:36 |
| 5. | "I'm the Only Woman" | Blige | Thompson; Combs | 4:30 |
| 6. | "K. Murray Interlude" (performed by Keith Murray) | Keith Murray; Thompson; Combs; Nashiem Myrick | Myrick; Thompson; Combs | 0:22 |
| 7. | "My Life" | Blige; Arlene DelValle; Thompson; Combs | Thompson; Combs | 4:17 |
| 8. | "You Gotta Believe" | Blige; Big Bub; Faith Evans; Cedric "K-Ci" Hailey; Thompson; Combs | Herb Middleton; Thompson; Combs | 5:02 |
| 9. | "I Never Wanna Live Without You" | Blige; Big Bub; Evans; Thompson; Combs; Middleton | Middleton; Thompson; Combs | 6:17 |
| 10. | "I'm Goin' Down" | Norman Whitfield | Thompson; Combs; Prince Charles Alexander^{[a]}; Mark "Led" Ledford^{[a]} | 3:42 |
| 11. | "My Life Interlude" | Blige; Big Bub; Thompson; Combs | Thompson; Combs | 1:15 |
| 12. | "Be with You" | Blige; Thompson; Combs | Thompson; Combs | 4:26 |
| 13. | "Mary's Joint" | Blige; Combs; Thompson | Thompson; Combs | 5:02 |
| 14. | "Don't Go" | Blige; Big Bub; Evans; Combs; Thompson | Thompson; Combs | 4:59 |
| 15. | "I Love You" | Blige; Combs | Thompson; Combs | 4:31 |
| 16. | "No One Else" | K-Ci Hailey | Mr. Dalvin | 4:15 |
| 17. | "Be Happy" | Blige (Lyrics); DelValle (Lyrics); Combs (Music); Jean-Claude Olivier (Music) | Combs; Poke | 5:49 |
| Total length: | | | | 64:59 |

International bonus track
| No. | Title | Writer(s) | Producer | Length |
|---|---|---|---|---|
| 18. | "(You Make Me Feel Like) A Natural Woman" | Gerry Goffin; Carole King; Jerry Wexler | James Mtume | 2:56 |
| Total length: | | | | 67:55 |

25th anniversary edition bonus disc
| No. | Title | Writer(s) | Producer | Length |
|---|---|---|---|---|
| 1. | "Mary Jane (All Night Long)" (Remix) (featuring LL Cool J) | James; Blige | Combs; Thompson | 5:31 |
| 2. | "I'm Goin' Down" (Remix) (featuring Mr. Cheeks) | Whitfield | Thompson; Combs; Alexander^{[a]}; Ledford^{[a]} | 3:50 |
| 3. | "I Love You" (Remix) (featuring Smif-N-Wessun) | Blige; Combs | Thompson; Combs | 4:55 |
| 4. | "Be Happy" (Bad Boy Butter Remix) | Blige (Lyrics); DelValle (Lyrics); Combs (Music); Olivier (Music) | Combs; Poke | 4:44 |
| 5. | "Be Happy" (Ron G Remix) | Blige (Lyrics); DelValle (Lyrics); Combs (Music); Olivier (Music) | Combs; Poke | 3:42 |
| 6. | "(You Make Me Feel Like) A Natural Woman" | Goffin; King; Wexler | Mtume | 2:56 |
| Total length: | | | | 25:38 |

=== Notes ===
- ^{^a} signifies a co-producer

Sample credits

- "Mary Jane (All Night Long)" contains an interpolation of "All Night Long" by Mary Jane Girls
- "Mary Jane (All Night Long)" also contains a sample of "Close the Door" by Teddy Pendergrass
- "You Bring Me Joy" contains a sample of "It's Ecstasy When You Lay Down Next to Me" by Barry White
- "I'm the Only Woman" contains a sample of "Give Me Your Love" by Curtis Mayfield
- "K. Murray Interlude" contains a sample of "I'm Afraid the Masquerade Is Over" by David Porter
- "K. Murray Interlude" music also used for "Who Shot Ya?" by The Notorious B.I.G.
- "My Life" contains a sample of "Everybody Loves the Sunshine" by Roy Ayers
- "Don't Go" contains a sample of "Goodbye Love" by Guy
- "Don't Go" also contains re-sung vocal samples of "Stay With Me" by DeBarge and "Speak to My Heart" by New York Restoration Choir with Donnie McClurkin
- "I Love You" contains a sample of "Ike's Mood I" by Isaac Hayes
- "No One Else" contains a sample of "Free At Last" by Al Green
- "No One Else" also contains a vocal sample of "La Di Da Di" by Doug E. Fresh & Slick Rick
- "Be Happy" contains a sample of "You're So Good to Me" by Curtis Mayfield
- "Be Happy" also contains a sample of "I Want You" by Marvin Gaye

== Personnel ==
Unless otherwise indicated, Information is taken from the Album's liner notes

- Mary J. Blige – vocals (1–2, 4, 10–12, 15, lead on 3, 5, 7–9, 13–14, 16–17), background vocals (8–9, additional on 14, 16)
- Andre Harrell – executive producer
- Big Bub – additional background vocals (14)
- Bassy Bob Brockmann – strings, additional keyboards (1), digital music programming (1, 3), recording engineer (3–5, 8–9, 11–12, 15), mixing (1, 3–4, 6, 8, 11–12)
- Bruce Purse – trumpet (10)
- Prince Charles Alexander – flute, piccolo flute, tenor saxophone (10), recording engineer (5, 7, 10, 15, 17), mixing (7, 10, 17)
- Chucky Thompson – keyboards (9, additional on 8), instruments (4, 11–13, all other on 9, additional on 2–3, 5, 7, 14–15, 17)
- Mr. Dalvin – arranger, additional instruments (16)
- Darryl Pearson – additional bass (16)
- Debra Young – production coordination
- Diane Monroe – violin (10)
- Eileen Folson – cello (10)
- Faith Evans – background vocals (8–9, additional on 14)
- Frank Colon – percussion (10)
- Fred McFarlane – additional keyboards (10)
- Gloria Agostini – harp (10)
- Herb Middleton – keyboards (8, additional on 9), all other instruments (8)
- Herb Powers – mastering
- JoDee Stringham – design
- JoJo Hailey – background vocals (3, 8)
- K-Ci Hailey – arranger, background vocals (8), background vocals (16)
- Keenya Mauldin – hair stylist
- Keith Murray – vocals (6)
- Kevin "K-Dog" Johnson – drums (10)
- Latonya J. Blige – background vocals (3, 5, 13, 17, additional on 7)
- Lenny Underwood – piano (10)
- Lesa Terry – violin (10)
- Mark "Led" Ledford – trumpet (10)
- Nasheim Myrick – recording engineer (1, 3–7, 9, 11–15, 17), music programming (3)
- Paul Pesco – guitar (10)
- Rashad Smith – additional music programming (7)
- Regina Carter – violin (10)
- Rich Travali – recording engineer (2, 9)
- Rob Paustian – recording engineer (15–16), mixing (16)
- Sam Fine – make-up
- Sante D'Orazio – photography
- Sean "Puffy" Combs – executive producer
- Sybil Pennix – stylist
- Tim Dawg – associate executive producer
- Tony Maserati – recording engineer (1, 5–7, 9, 11, 13–15), mixing (2, 5, 7, 9, 13–15, 17)
- Victor Bailey – bass (10)
- Vincent Henry – alto saxophone (10)

== Charts ==
=== Weekly charts ===
Weekly chart performance for My Life
| Chart (1994–95) | Peak position |
|---|---|
| Australian Albums (ARIA) | 111 |
| Canada Top Albums/CDs (RPM) | 37 |
| Dutch Albums (Album Top 100) | 69 |
| UK Albums (Official Charts) | 59 |
| UK R&B Albums (Official Charts) | 7 |
| US Billboard 200 | 7 |
| US Top R&B/Hip-Hop Albums (Billboard) | 1 |

=== Year-end charts ===
Year-end chart performance for My Life
| Chart (1995) | Position |
|---|---|
| US Billboard 200 | 20 |
| US Top R&B/Hip-Hop Albums (Billboard) | 1 |

== Certifications ==
| Region | Certification | Certified units/sales |
|---|---|---|
| Canada (Music Canada) | Gold | 50,000^{^} |
| United Kingdom (BPI) | Gold | 100,000^{*} |
| United States (RIAA) | 3× Platinum | 3,000,000^{^} |
^{*} Sales figures based on certification alone.^{^} Shipments figures based on certification alone.

== See also ==
- Mary J. Blige's My Life
- List of number-one R&B albums of 1994 (U.S.)
- List of number-one R&B albums of 1995 (U.S.)
- Billboard Year-End
