= Share My World =

Studio album by Mary J. Blige
- Released: April 22, 1997
- Studios: The Hit Factory (New York City); Battery Studios; Chicago Trax; The Chicago Recording Company (Chicago, Illinois); Flyte Tyme Studios (Edina, Minnesota); The Record Plant (Los Angeles, California)
- Genre: R&B
- Length: 68:34
- Labels: MCA; Universal
- Producers: Steve Stoute; Babyface; Bryce Wilson; George Pearson; James Mtume; Jimmy Jam & Terry Lewis; Malik Pendleton; Poke & Tone; Rodney Jerkins; R. Kelly

Mary J. Blige chronology
My Life (1994)	Share My World (1997)	The Tour (1998)

Singles from Share My World
- 1. "Love Is All We Need" Released: March 18, 1997; 2. "I Can Love You" Released: May 6, 1997; 3. "Everything" Released: August 4, 1997; 4. "Missing You" Released: October 2, 1997; 5. "Seven Days" Released: March 20, 1998

Share My World is the third studio album by American R&B singer Mary J. Blige, released by MCA on April 22, 1997. The album became Blige's first to open at number one on the US Billboard 200 album chart. Moreover, it is her first album where she serves as an executive producer, alongside Steve Stoute, who also shared executive producer credits on the album.

Guest appearances are made by hip hop and R&B stars such as Lil' Kim, Nas, The LOX, George Benson, Roy Ayers and R. Kelly. The album was released to generally positive reviews from most music critics, and earned Blige numerous accolades and nominations, including a Grammy Award nomination for Best R&B Album in 1998. The album became her first to chart in the top ten internationally, including Canada, Sweden and the UK, while it entered the top forty in countries such as New Zealand, Germany and France.

It is certified triple platinum by the Recording Industry Association of America (RIAA) for excess of three million copies shipped in the US.

== Background ==
Share My World marked several personal and professional changes in Blige’s life and career. Following the departure of label head Andre Harrell the year before, Blige defected from Uptown Records in favor of its MCA parent. Meanwhile, she severed professional ties with long-time producer, manager and mentor Sean "Puffy" Combs shortly before the production of Share My World began. His absence was filled with a bevy of high-profile producers, such as: Rodney Jerkins, Jimmy Jam and Terry Lewis, Babyface, Bryce Wilson and R. Kelly. The result produced an album that was less entrenched in the hip hop soul of her first two albums, and replaced with a style that was more aligned with R&B.

During the making and run of her second album My Life (1994), Blige had reportedly experienced clinical depression, while also battling drug and alcohol addiction, and enduring an often turbulent relationship with K-Ci Hailey — all of which heavily influenced the dark mood of that album. In late 1996, however, Blige reportedly made a concerted effort to clean up her life and subsequently found herself in more positive frame of mind while recording Share My World, which influenced the albums noticeably lighter mood.

== Critical reception ==
Professional ratings
Review scores
Source	Rating
AllMusic	4/5 stars
Chicago Tribune	2/4 stars
Encyclopedia of Popular Music	4/5 stars
Entertainment Weekly	B+
Music Week	4/5 stars
Rolling Stone	3/5 stars
The Rolling Stone Album Guide	2.5/5 stars
Spin	8/10
USA Today	3.5/4 stars
The Village Voice	A−

Alex Henderson of AllMusic wrote in his review, "Her strongest and most confident effort up to that point, Share had much more character, personality, and honesty than most of the assembly line fare dominating urban radio in 1997. For all their slickness, emotive cuts like "Get to Know You Better," "Love Is All We Need," and "Keep Your Head" left no doubt that Blige was indeed a singer of depth and substance. Although high tech, the production of everyone from R. Kelly (with whom she duets on the inviting "It's On") and Babyface to Jimmy Jam and Terry Lewis doesn't come across as forced or robotic, but, in fact, is impressively organic." Ernest Hardy of Rolling Stone commended Blige's transition from sound to singing, writing that "On Share My World even Blige's harshest critics will have to concede that she's moved beyond sound to real singing. Listen to "Seven Days," "Missing You" and the already-classic "Not Gon' Cry" (also on the Waiting to Exhale soundtrack), and you hear Blige's signature ache married to newfound technique. There's shading, depth and control in her vocals now."

Steve Jones of USA Today said the songs "run the usual gamut of love themes, but it's Blige's powerful, emotional deliveries and street sensibility that separate her from the competition." Village Voice critic Robert Christgau said "Blige is a diva for her own time. As befits her hip hop ethos, she's never soft if often vulnerable, and as befits her hip hop aesthetic, she plays her natural vocal cadences for melodic signature and sometimes hook. She redefines the New York accent for the '90s. And she's taken two straight follow-ups to the next level." Jonathan Bernstein from Entertainment Weekly was more critical, finding Share My World "uneven" and the songwriting "meandering and half finished." Tom Moon later wrote in The Rolling Stone Album Guide (2004) that the record displayed "Blige's hit-song savvy but fewer memorable performances" than previous albums. The Sydney Morning Herald critic Bernard Zuel found that "the well-stocked cupboard here (18 songs) is full of lush settings and beats which suggest a little action, even if they are more supine than fly-time [...] Lyrically, this is your typical R&B deadzone with many of the raps heading nowhere fast and Mary J. having not much to say beyond love me/stay with me/come back to me."

=== Awards and nominations ===
Ceremony	Category	Result
25th Annual American Music Awards	Favorite Soul/R&B Album	Won
25th Annual American Music Awards	Favorite Soul/R&B Female Artist	Nominated
40th Grammy Awards	Best R&B Album	Nominated
Soul Train Music Awards	Best R&B/Soul Album – Female	Nominated
Soul Train Music Awards	Best R&B/Soul Single – Female (for "Everything")	Nominated
Soul Train Lady of Soul Awards	Best R&B/Soul Album	Won
NAACP Image Awards	Outstanding Female Artist	Nominated

== Commercial performance ==
For the Billboard issue dated May 10, 1997, Share My World debuted at number one on both the US Billboard 200 and R&B Albums chart with sales of 240,000 copies, marking Blige's first official number-one album on the Billboard 200 chart. The album had ended the four-week stint of Life After Death by The Notorious B.I.G., which was released posthumously five weeks earlier.

In addition to debuting number one in the US, the album also debuted in the top ten in countries such as Canada, Sweden and the UK. The album also reached the top forty in France, Germany and New Zealand.

Share My World was certified triple Platinum by the Recording Industry Association of America (RIAA), for shipments of three million copies in the US. As of December 2009, the album has since sold 2.8 million copies domestically.

== Track listing ==
Share My World track listing
No.	Title	Writer(s)	Producer(s)	Length
1.	"Intro"	Poke & Tone; Rich Nice	Poke & Tone; Nice	1:24
2.	"I Can Love You" (featuring Lil' Kim)	Blige; Kimberly Jones; Rodney Jerkins; Carlos Broady; Nashiem Myrick	R. Jerkins	4:46
3.	"Love Is All We Need" (featuring Nas)	Blige; James Harris III; Terry Lewis; Nasir Jones; Rick James	Jimmy Jam & Terry Lewis	4:14
4.	"Round and Round"	Blige; Poke; DJ Premier; Shawn Carter	Poke & Tone; George “Golden Fingers” Pearson^{[a]}	4:24
5.	"Share My World (Interlude)"	Poke & Tone; Nice	Poke & Tone; Nice	0:30
6.	"Share My World"	Blige; R. Jerkins	R. Jerkins	5:07
7.	"Seven Days"	Malik Pendleton	Pendleton	5:09
8.	"It's On" (featuring R. Kelly)	Kelly	Kelly	4:42
9.	"Thank You Lord (Interlude)"	Kelly Price; R. Jerkins	R. Jerkins	0:44
10.	"Missing You"	Babyface	Babyface	4:16
11.	"Everything"	Harris; Lewis; Hachidai Nakamura; Rokusuke Ei; James Brown; Linda Creed; Thom Bell; John Starks; Fred Wesley	Jimmy Jam & Terry Lewis	4:59
12.	"Keep Your Head"	Blige; LaTonya Blige-DaCosta	Poke & Tone; Pearson	3:48
13.	"Can't Get You Off My Mind" (featuring The LOX)	Blige; R. Jerkins; Jason Phillips; Sean Jacobs; David Styles	R. Jerkins	4:39
14.	"Get to Know You Better"	Bryce Wilson	Wilson	4:32
15.	"Searching" (featuring Roy Ayers)	Blige; Blige-DaCosta; Xenos DaCosta; R. Jerkins; Fred Jerkins III; Roy Ayers	R. Jerkins; F. Jerkins	5:05
16.	"Our Love"	Chuck Jackson; Marvin Yancy	James Mtume	5:21
17.	"Not Gon' Cry"	Babyface	Babyface	4:54
Total length:				68:34

United Kingdom and Japan bonus track
No.	Title	Writer(s)	Producer(s)	Length
18.	"(You Make Me Feel Like) A Natural Woman"	Gerry Goffin; Carole King; Jerry Wexler	Mtume	2:57
Total length:				71:31

Notes

- ^{^[a]} denotes co-producer(s)

Sample credits

- "I Can Love You" contains a sample of "Queen Bitch" as performed by Lil' Kim.
- "Love Is All We Need" contains a sample of "Moonchild" as performed by Rick James.
- "Round and Round" contains a sample of "Go Back Home" as performed by Allen Toussaint.
- "Share My World" contains an interpolation of "Share My World" by DeBarge.
- "Everything" contains a sample of "You Are Everything" as performed by The Stylistics; "The Payback" as performed by James Brown; "Sukiyaki" as performed by A Taste of Honey.
- "Searching" contains replayed elements of "Searchin" as performed by Roy Ayers.

== Personnel ==
=== Musicians ===
- Roy Ayers – Vibraphone
- George Benson – Guitar
- Gene Bianco – String Arrangements, String Conductor, String Contractor
- LaTonya Blige-DaCosta – Vocals (Background)
- Mary J. Blige – Executive Producer, Vocals, Vocals (Background)
- Darryl Brown – Bass
- Mary Brown – Vocals (Background)
- Mike Campbell – Guitar
- Lafayette Carthon, Jr. – Keyboards
- Minio Class – Fender Rhodes
- DJ Do It All – Scratching
- Nathan East – Bass
- Kenneth "Babyface" Edmonds – Arranger, Drum Programming, Keyboards, Musician, Producer
- Basil Fearrington – Bass
- Michael Jordan – Guitar
- R. Kelly – Instrumentation, Mixing, Multi Instruments, Performer, Producer, Vocals, Vocals (Background)
- Lil' Kim – Rap
- The LOX – Rap
- Josh Milan – Keyboards
- Ed Moore – Guitar
- Ed Tree Moore – Guitar
- James Mussen – Drums
- Nas – Rap
- Dunn Pearson, Jr. – Keyboards
- Malik Pendleton – Mixing, Multi Instruments, Producer, Vocal Arrangement, Vocals (Background)
- Mike Scott – Guitar
- Shanice – Vocals (Background)
- Abdulhameed Zuhri – Guitar

=== Production ===
- Dionne Alexander – Hair Stylist
- Bilal Allah – Sequencing
- Engineer
- Kyle Bess – Assistant Engineer, Mixing, Mixing Assistant
- Bob "Bassy" Bob Brackmann – Mixing
- Chris Brickley – Engineer
- Trey Fratt – Assistant Engineer
- Lyndell Fraser – Engineer
- Jon Gass – Mixing
- Stephen George – Engineer, Mixing, Programming
- Brad Gilderman – Engineer
- Kenny J. Gravillis – Art Direction, Design
- Steve Hodge – Engineer, Mixing
- Jimmy Jam – Arranger, Instrumentation, Multi Instruments, Musical Associate, Producer
- Fred Jerkins III – Mixing, Multi Instruments, Producer
- Rodney Jerkins – Arranger, Drum Arrangements, Drum Programming, Instrumentation, Introduction, Mixing, Multi Instruments, Musician, Producer, Rap, Vocals
- Derek Khan – Stylist
- Jeff Lane – Assistant Engineer
- Ken Lewis – Engineer, Mixing
- Terry Lewis – Arranger, Instrumentation, Multi Instruments, Musical Associate, Producer
- Ron Lowe – Assistant Engineer
- Tony Maserati – Engineer, Mixing
- Mr Lee – Programming
- James Mtume – Keyboards, Producer
- Rich Nice – Arranger, Narrator, Producer
- Appolon "Chap" Noel – Assistant, Assistant Engineer, Engineer
- Nzínga – Make-Up
- One Drop Scott – Arranger, Drum Programming
- George R. "Golden Fingers" Pearson – Keyboards, Producer
- Angela Piva – Engineer, Mixing
- Poke – Arranger, Drum Programming, Producer
- Poke & Tone – Arranger, Drum Programming
- Herb Powers – Mastering
- David Radin – Sequencing
- Dexter Simmons – Engineer, Mixing
- Ivy Skoff – Production Assistant, Production Coordination
- Xavier Smith – Assistant, Assistant Engineer, Mixing, Mixing Assistant
- Steve Stoute – Executive Producer, Sequencing
- Greg Thompson – Assistant Engineer
- Ed Tinley – Assistant, Assistant Engineer, Engineer
- Tizone – Mixing
- Tone – Arranger, Drum Programming, Producer
- Richard Travali – Engineer, Mixing
- Tom Vercillo – Engineer, Mixing
- Randy Walker – MIDI, MIDI Programming, Programming
- Kevin Westenberg – Photography
- Bryce Wilson – Keyboards, Producer

== Charts ==
=== Weekly charts ===
Weekly chart performance for Share My World
Chart (1997)	Peak position
Australian Albums (ARIA)	71
Canada Top Albums/CDs (RPM)	4
Dutch Albums (Album Top 100)	11
European Albums (Music & Media)	22
French Albums (SNEP)	31
German Albums (Offizielle Top 100)	37
Japanese Albums (Oricon)	43
New Zealand Albums (RMNZ)	27
Scottish Albums (Official Charts)	90
Swedish Albums (Sverigetopplistan)	8
Swiss Albums (Schweizer Hitparade)	41
UK Albums (Official Charts)	8
UK R&B Albums (Official Charts)	1
US Billboard 200	1
US Top R&B/Hip-Hop Albums (Billboard)	1

=== Year-end charts ===
Year-end chart performance for Share My World
Chart (1997)	Position
Canadian Albums (SoundScan)	85
Canadian R&B Albums (SoundScan)	13
UK Albums (OCC)	87
US Billboard 200	25
US Top R&B/Hip-Hop Albums (Billboard)	4

== Certifications ==
Certifications for Share My World
Region	Certification	Certified units/sales
Canada (Music Canada)	Platinum	100,000^{^}
Japan (RIAJ)	Gold	100,000^{^}
United Kingdom (BPI)	Gold	100,000^{^}
United States (RIAA)	3× Platinum	3,000,000^{^}
^{^} Shipments figures based on certification alone.

== See also ==
- List of number-one albums of 1997 (U.S.)
- List of number-one R&B albums of 1997 (U.S.)
