= I Can Love You =

1997 single by Mary J. Blige

Single by Mary J. Blige

from the album Share My World
- Released: June 9, 1997
- Studio: The Record Plant (Los Angeles, California)
- Length: 4:23
- Label: MCA
- Songwriters: Mary J. Blige; LaTonya Blige-DaCosta; Rodney Jerkins; Kimberly Jones; Carlos Broady; Nashiem Myrick
- Producer: Rodney Jerkins

Mary J. Blige singles chronology
"Love Is All We Need" (1997)	"I Can Love You" (1997)	"Everything" (1997)

Lil' Kim singles chronology
"Crush On You" (1997)	"I Can Love You" (1997)	"Not Tonight" (Ladies Night remix) (1997)

Music video
- "I Can Love You" on YouTube

"I Can Love You" is a song by American recording artist Mary J. Blige. It was written by Blige along with her sister LaTonya Blige-DaCosta, Rodney Jerkins, and Lil' Kim for her third album, Share My World (1997), with Jerkins producing the song and Lil' Kim providing additional vocals. The song contains elements of the song "Queen Bitch," a track from Kim's debut album Hard Core (1996), co-written by Carlos Broady and Nashiem Myrick. Due to the inclusion of the sample, they are also credited as songwriters.

The song was released to generally positive reviews from music critics and issued by MCA Records as the second US single from Share My World on June 9, 1997. It emerged as the album's highest-charting single, reaching number 28 on the US Billboard Hot 100, while also peaking at number two on the Billboard Hot R&B Singles chart. The accompanying music video was directed by Kevin Bray.

== Background ==
"I Can Love You" was written by Blige along with her sister LaTonya Blige-DaCosta, Rodney Jerkins, and Lil' Kim for her third album, Share My World (1997), while production was helmed by Jerkins. Jerkins had heard through MCA Records A&R Hank Shocklee that Blige was holding a listening session in New York City to recruit producers for her next project Share My World. Coincidentally, he received a call from Blige who was a fan of his work on singer Gina Thompson's 1996 single "The Things That You Do" and wanted him to come to New York to play some ideas for her. Jerkins, who would end up placing five tracks on Share My World, came up at least ten tracks which he felt were urgent to Blige.

In 2020, he commented on "I Can Love You" in an interview with VLAD TV: "When I got in the room I played [...] the beat and Mary went crazy and she was like 'You're not leaving New York. You're staying here. We're gonna work this week'." Jerkins further elaborated on the nature of the song which samples the piano movements in the beginning of "Queen Bitch," a track from Kim's debut album Hard Core (1996): "That beat was so different. It was like the way that it was structured, it was just meant to be a Mary classic in my mind [...] I had the sample from Lil Kim and I was just like 'I'll put some cords over that.' I always felt like the essence of Mary was hip-hop so I was like 'This was an artist that used hip-hop beats and had chords over top,' so that's what I wanted just to establish with her."

== Critical reception ==
"I Can Love You" earned largely positive reviews from music critics. Larry Flick from Billboard magazine called the song "a deserved smash." He found that "like its predecessor, 'Love Is All We Need', this jam cruises at an uplifting jeep-funk pace, with Miss Blige getting sultry over layers of soothing love chants tightly arranged by producer-of-the-moment Rodney Jerkins. The result is a wickedly catchy jam that will sooth a brow fevered by the ongoing spree of factory-like funk that crowds the airwaves. Top 40 will probably focus on the snug rap-free edit, though the more airy and expansive album version has a guest rhyme by Lil' Kim that's quite cute and well worth a listen."

Alexis Petridis, writing for The Guardian, called the song "terrific. The strings swirl and sigh, Blige brings the unrequited heartbreak, Lil' Kim takes a more straightforward approach to luring the object of her affections away from his relationship." Da'Shan Smith from uDiscoverMusic found that the track "features one of Kim's best verses over a sample of her own track 'Queen Bitch', an infamous cut released by the rapper on her 1996 debut album, Hard Core. It was a unique moment of female solidarity and a piece of hip-hop history." BET.com called the song "one of the finest examples of Blige's symbiotic relationship with hip hop: Here, she somehow transforms Lil Kim's cocky mission statement 'Queen Bitch' into another heartfelt, unmistakably Mary plea for love." Vibe felt that Lil' Kim's "hard-hitting delivery perfectly complements Blige's soulful lyrics, and somehow you find yourself bumping to a song about stealing another woman's man."

== Chart performance ==
Unlike Share My World's first single, "Love Is All We Need", "I Can Love You" was issued as a commercial single in United States, where it served as the album's second single. It peaked at number two on the US Billboard Hot R&B Singles chart while also reaching number 28 on the Billboard Hot 100, becoming Share My World's highest-charting single. It was eventually ranked 31st on Billboard's Hot R&B Singles year-end chart for 1997. Elsewhere, "I Can Love You" was released as the B-side to Blige's 1997 single "Missing You."

== Music video ==
The music video for "I Can Love You" was shot in May 1997 and directed by American director Kevin Bray. Shot at a house in the woods, the video features Mary in scenes outside, as well as her, Kim, and others partying and having fun inside.

== Track listings ==
US cassette single US CD single

1. "I Can Love You" (album version) – 4:47
2. "Love Is All We Need" (Trackmasters remix featuring Foxy Brown) – 4:58

US double 12-inch single

1. "I Can Love You" (album version) – 4:47
2. "I Can Love You" (instrumental) – 5:14
3. "I Can Love You" (a cappella) – 5:03
4. "Love Is All We Need" (Trackmasters remix featuring Foxy Brown) – 4:58
5. "Love Is All We Need" (Trackmasters remix featuring Foxy Brown instrumental) – 4:11
6. "Love Is All We Need" (Trackmasters remix featuring Foxy Brown a cappella) – 4:13

Sample credits

- "I Can Love You" contains elements from "Queen Bitch" (1996) as performed by Lil' Kim.
- "Love Is All We Need (All We Need Is Love Remix)" contains replayed elements from "The Theme from Mahogany" (1975) as performed by Diana Ross.

== Personnel ==
Personnel are adapted from the Share My World liner notes.

- Mary J. Blige – lead vocals, background vocals, writing
- LaTonya Blige-DaCosta – background vocals, writing
- Carlos Broady – writing (sample)
- Rodney Jerkins – writing, production
- Lil' Kim – additional vocals, writing
- Nashiem Myrick – writing (sample)

== Charts ==
=== Weekly charts ===
Weekly chart performance for "I Can Love You"
Chart (1997)	Peak position
US Billboard Hot 100	28
US Dance Singles Sales (Billboard) with "Love Is All We Need"	9
US Hot R&B/Hip-Hop Songs (Billboard) with "Love Is All We Need"	2

=== Year-end charts ===
Year-end chart performance for "I Can Love You"
Chart (1997)	Position
US Hot R&B Singles (Billboard)	31

== Release history ==
Release dates and formats for "I Can Love You"
Region	Date	Format(s)	Label(s)	Ref.
United States	June 9, 1997	Urban radio	MCA	
Japan	September 22, 1997	CD	MCA	
