= I Love You (Mary J. Blige song) =

1995 single by Mary J. Blige

Single by Mary J. Blige

from the album My Life
- A-side: "You Bring Me Joy"
- Released: May 28, 1995
- Recorded: 1994
- Genre: R&B; soul; hip-hop soul
- Label: Uptown; MCA
- Songwriters: Isaac Hayes; Mary J. Blige; Sean Combs
- Producer: Chucky Thompson

Mary J. Blige singles chronology
"You Bring Me Joy" (1995)	"I Love You" (1995)	"(You Make Me Feel Like) A Natural Woman" (1995)

"I Love You" is a song by American singer-songwriter Mary J. Blige, released in May 1995 by Uptown and MCA Records, as the first single from her second album, My Life (1994). It was included as a B-side on the standard cassette release of Blige's single "You Bring Me Joy". It charted as a double A-side with "You Bring Me Joy", peaking at numbers 43 and 57 on the US Cash Box Top 100 and Billboard Hot 100 charts, and number 29 on the Billboard Hot R&B/Hip-Hop songs chart.

There were plans and negotiations of a possible music video for this single to be shot back-to-back with "You Bring Me Joy", but plans were scrapped. I Love You (Part 2) was recorded with rapper duo Smif-n-Wessun. The song samples the piano loop of Isaac Hayes's "Ike's Mood" from 1970's album "...To Be Continued", and samples "Hollywood's World" by DJ Hollywood.

== Charts ==
Chart (1995)	Peak position
US Billboard Hot 100 You Bring Me Joy / I Love You	57
US Hot R&B/Hip-Hop Songs (Billboard) You Bring Me Joy / I Love You	29
US Cash Box Top 100 "You Bring Me Joy / I Love You"	43

== Other recordings ==
- I Love You (Part 3) was later recorded by Keyshia Cole. On Cole's version, rapper Lil' Wayne is featured.
