= You Bring Me Joy (Mary J. Blige song) =

1995 single by Mary J. Blige

- Artwork used for US commercial cassette releases

Single by Mary J. Blige

from the album My Life
- Released: May 23, 1995
- Length: 4:36
- Label: Uptown; MCA
- Songwriters: Mary J. Blige; Sean "Puffy" Combs; Joel "Jo-Jo" Hailey; Chucky Thompson; Ekundayo Paris; Nelson Pigford
- Producers: Sean "Puffy" Combs; Chucky Thompson

Mary J. Blige singles chronology
"I'll Be There for You/You're All I Need to Get By" (1995)	"You Bring Me Joy" (1995)	"I Love You" (1995)

"You Bring Me Joy" is a song by American singer-songwriter Mary J. Blige. It was written by Blige, Sean "Puffy" Combs, Joel "Jo-Jo" Hailey, and Chucky Thompson for her second studio album, My Life (1994), while overall music production was helmed by Combs and Thompson with the vocal tracks being produced by Jo-Jo. The song is built around a sample of "It's Ecstasy When You Lay Down Next to Me" (1977) by singer Barry White. Due to the inclusion of the sample, Ekundayo Paris and Nelson Pigford are also credited as songwriters.

"You Bring Me Joy" served as the third single from My Life and topped the US Billboard Dance Club Play chart. Charting alongside Blige's next single, "I Love You", it also reached number 57 on the Billboard Hot 100 and number 29 on the Billboard Hot R&B Singles chart. "You Bring Me Joy" was also a club hit in the United Kingdom, peaking at number five on the Record Mirror Club Chart.

== Critical reception ==
Steve Baltin from Cash Box wrote, "Without achieving the notoriety of a Boyz II Men or Whitney Houston, Blige has quickly become one of the surest bets on both the pop and R&B singles charts, currently appearing twice on each chart. The latest single from her My Life album is sure to follow suit rapidly. Featuring a solid beat to accompany Blige's sweet vocals, the track is a natural at a plethora of formats." Jonathan Bernstein from Spin noted, "The same piano intro that gave 'Real Love' its irresistible bounce reappears to serve the same purpose in 'You Bring Me Joy'."

== Music video ==
The accompanying music video for "You Bring Me Joy" was directed by Marcus Raboy. It was shot at a big blue and red room from April 10–11, 1995 where Blige and other dancers do crazy dance moves. The video was later published on Blige's official YouTube channel in December 2019, and had generated more than 1.3 million views as of January 2023.

== Track listing ==
- US cassette single
1. "You Bring Me Joy" (album version) – 4:14
2. "I Love You" (album version) – 4:31
- US cassette maxi-single
1. "You Bring Me Joy" (album version) – 4:14
2. "You Bring Me Joy" (E-Smoove's Soul mix) – 5:23
3. "You Bring Me Joy" (E-Smoove's Funk mix) – 4:18
4. "You Bring Me Joy" (E-Smoove's Dub mix) – 8:19
- US 12-inch single
1. "You Bring Me Joy" (album version) – 4:14
2. "You Bring Me Joy" (E-Smoove's Funk mix) – 4:18
3. "You Bring Me Joy" (E-Smoove's Dub mix) – 8:19

== Personnel ==
Personnel are adapted from the My Life liner notes.

- Mary J. Blige – lead vocals
- LaTonya J. Blige – background vocals
- Joel "Jo-Jo" Hailey – background vocals
- Chucky Thompson – additional instruments
- Bassy Bob Brockman – music programming, recording engineer, mixing
- Nashiem Myrick – music programming, recording engineer

== Charts ==
=== Weekly charts ===
Chart (1995)	Peak position
UK Club Chart (Music Week)	5
UK Pop Tip Club Chart (Music Week)	21
US Billboard Hot 100 with "I Love You"	57
US Dance Club Songs (Billboard)	1
US Dance Singles Sales (Billboard)	25
US Hot R&B/Hip-Hop Songs (Billboard) with "I Love You"	29
US Cash Box Top 100	28

=== Year-end charts ===
Chart (1995)	Position
UK Club Chart (Music Week)	86
US Dance Club Play (Billboard)	40
US Hot R&B Singles (Billboard)	97

== Release history ==
Release dates and format(s) for "You Bring Me Joy"
Region	Date	Format(s)	Label(s)	Ref.
United States	May 23, 1995	Rhythmic contemporary radio	Uptown; MCA	
