= Everything (Mary J. Blige song) =

1997 single by Mary J. Blige

Single by Mary J. Blige

from the album Share My World
- Released: August 4, 1997
- Studio: Flyte Time (Edina, Minnesota)
- Length: 4:59
- Label: MCA
- Songwriters: James Harris III; Terry Lewis
- Producer: Jimmy Jam & Terry Lewis

Mary J. Blige singles chronology
| "I Can Love You" (1997) | "Everything" (1997) | "Missing You" (1997) |

Music video
- "Everything" on YouTube

"Everything" is a song by American singer Mary J. Blige. It was written and produced by Jimmy Jam & Terry Lewis for Blige's third album, Share My World (1997). The song contains samples from "You Are Everything" (1971) by American soul group The Stylistics and "The Payback" (1973) by American singer James Brown, also incorporating elements from "Sukiyaki" (1961) by Japanese singer Kyu Sakamoto. Due to the inclusion of the samples, Brown, Hachidai Nakamura, Rokusuke Ei, Linda Creed, Thom Bell, John Starks, and Fred Wesley are also credited as songwriters.

MCA Records released the song as the third single from Share My World in August 1997. "Everything" reached number twenty-four on the US Billboard Hot 100 and number five on the US Hot R&B/Hip-Hop Songs. It also peaked at number six on the UK Singles Chart, becoming Blige's first top ten hit in the UK, and entered the top ten in the Netherlands and the top twenty in New Zealand. An accompanying music video, directed by Hype Williams, was filmed in Kauaʻi, Hawaii in June 1997.

== Critical reception ==
Larry Flick from Billboard stated in his review of "Everything", that Blige "is in typically solid diva form on this romantic jeep cruiser, which is fueled by a prominent sample of "You Are Everything" by the Stylistics, as well as a snippet from James Brown's "The Payback"." He noted that producers Jam and Lewis "do an exemplary job of letting Blige breathe freely as an artist (which she does with delicious soul), while also injecting their own signature pop/R&B flavor." Jonathan Bernstein from Entertainment Weekly felt that "she unleashes equal joy" on the song. Alan Jones from Music Week declared it as a "wonderful Jam & Lewis creation" and "a spartan urban contemporary track, which provides emphatic proof of Blige's singing ability." Ralph Tee from the magazine's RM Dance Update concluded, "For me this is the standout song from 'Share My World', the familiarity factor in the music and Mary's best vocal yet having a lot to do with it." Gerald Martinez from New Sunday Times opined that Blige "mixes sweetness and power". Laura Jamison from Salon also noted that "Everything" quotes Stylistics' song, adding that it "draws you in with its sheer familiarity."

== Music video ==
The accompanying music video for the song was directed by American director Hype Williams and shot in Kauaʻi, Hawaii in June 1997. The video blends South Asian style against the lush jungles, cliffs and black sand beaches of the island.

== Track listings ==
CD single (CD1), UK (1997)
| No. | Title | Length |
|---|---|---|
| 1. | "Everything" (album version) | 5:01 |
| 2. | "Everything" (Full Crew club mix) | 4:31 |
| 3. | "Everything" (Curtis & Moore vocal mix) | 7:13 |
| 4. | "Love Is All We Need" (remix) | 4:13 |

CD single (CD2), UK (1997)
| No. | Title | Length |
|---|---|---|
| 1. | "Everything" (Instant Flava Mix) | 4:31 |
| 2. | "Everything" (Full Crew Old Skool Mix) | 4:14 |
| 3. | "Everything" (Curtis & Moore dub) | 6:00 |
| 4. | "Everyday" | 4:24 |

Cassette single, UK (1997)
| No. | Title | Length |
|---|---|---|
| 1. | "Everything" (LP edit) |
| 2. | "Everything" (classic radio edit) |

== Credits and personnel ==
Credits are adapted from the Share My World liner notes.

- Thom Bell – writer (sample)
- Mary J. Blige – executive producer, vocals
- James Brown – writer (sample)
- Linda Creed – writer (sample)
- Rokusuke Ei – writer (sample)
- James Harris III – producer, writer
- Terry Lewis – producer, writer
- Hachidai Nakamura – writer (sample)
- John Starks – writer (sample)
- Steve Stoute – producer
- Fred Wesley – writer (sample)
- Elbernita "Twinkie" Clark – writer (sample)

== Charts ==
=== Weekly charts ===
| Chart (1997) | Peak position |
|---|---|
| Australia (ARIA) | 125 |
| Europe (Eurochart Hot 100) | 23 |
| Iceland (Íslenski Listinn Topp 40) | 36 |
| Netherlands (Dutch Top 40 Tipparade) | 6 |
| Netherlands (Single Top 100) | 62 |
| New Zealand (Recorded Music NZ) | 13 |
| Scottish Singles Sales (Official Charts) | 31 |
| UK Singles (Official Charts) | 6 |
| UK Hip Hop/R&B (Official Charts) | 3 |
| US Billboard Hot 100 | 24 |
| US Dance Singles Sales (Billboard) | 2 |
| US Hot R&B/Hip-Hop Songs (Billboard) | 5 |
| US Rhythmic Airplay (Billboard) | 11 |

=== Year-end charts ===
| Chart (1997) | Position |
|---|---|
| US Hot R&B Singles (Billboard) | 46 |
| Chart (1998) | Position |
| US Hot R&B Singles (Billboard) | 66 |

== Certifications ==
| Region | Certification | Certified units/sales |
|---|---|---|
| United Kingdom (BPI) | Silver | 200,000^{‡} |
^{‡} Sales+streaming figures based on certification alone.

== Release history ==
| Region | Date | Format(s) | Label(s) | Ref. |
|---|---|---|---|---|
| United States | July 29, 1997 | Rhythmic contemporary radio | MCA | |
| United Kingdom | August 4, 1997 | CD; cassette | MCA | |
| Japan | August 6, 1997 | CD | MCA | |
| United Kingdom | August 11, 1997 | 12-inch vinyl | MCA | |
| United States | September 30, 1997 | Contemporary hit radio | MCA | |
