= Seven Days (Mary J. Blige song) =

Single by Mary J. Blige

from the album Share My World
- Released: March 20, 1998
- Studio: Battery Studios, Chicago
- Length: 5:09
- Label: MCA
- Songwriter: Malik Pendleton
- Producer: Malik Pendleton

Mary J. Blige singles chronology
"Missing You" (1997)	"Seven Days" (1998)	"As" (1999)

Music video
- "Seven Days" on YouTube

"Seven Days" is a song by American singer Mary J. Blige. It was written and produced by Malik Pendleton for her third studio album Share My World (1997). The song is supported with a guitar solo from American guitarist George Benson. Lyrically, "Seven Days" talks about a woman going through a dilemma in a relationship with a man who had been her best friend before a truth or dare? game led to them experiencing a relationship that has left Blige and the man in question at a crossroads of how to address each other.

The song was released as the album's fourth and final single by MCA Records on March 20, 1998. "Seven Days" peaked at number three on the US R&B/Hip-Hop Airplay and number 71 US Radio Songs, also reaching number 22 on the UK Singles Chart. Blige gave a memorable performance of "Seven Days" at the 25th American Music Awards, again with a guitar solo from Benson.

== Critical reception ==
Larry Flick from Billboard magazine wrote that the song "casts the Queen of Hip-Hop Soul as a woman trying to reconcile a foray into forbidden love, a role she plays to the hilt." He added, "Her diva chops are as sharp as ever as she whips through the track's bluesy ballad sound with palpable grit and drama. Producer Malik Pendleton presides over a flawless remix during which Blige breaks it down for a spoken passage that would make Millie Jackson proud. There's also a version of the song featuring George Benson floating one of his trademark jazz guitar solos. Pick a version—and play it over and over and over again."

== Music video ==
A music video was produced to promote the single and premiered in September 1997. It was directed by Steve Willis and features George Benson towards the end playing a guitar. Throughout the video, Blige sings in many places; many scenes where she is singing include in the car in which she is driving down the street, in the bed, in her bedroom, and in her condo. Her love interest is featured prominently throughout the video with her as well especially in the scenes where they are sitting on opposite sides of the bed or while watching television where two people are kissing.

== Track listings ==
US CD single
No.	Title	Writer(s)	Producer(s)	Length
1.	"Seven Days" (radio edit)	Malik Pendleton	Pendleton	3:57
2.	"Seven Days" (remix)	Pendleton	Pendleton	5:36
3.	"Round and Round" (Brooklyn Funk R&B Bump Mix featuring Big Pun)	Mary J. Blige; Poke; DJ Premier; Shawn Carter	Poke & Tone; George "Golden Fingers" Pearson^{[a]}; Leroy "Ysae (e-say)" Southwell^{[b]}	5:28
4.	"Round and Round" (Brooklyn Funk B-Boy Mix featuring Elementary & Half Time)	Blige; Poke; DJ Premier; Carter	Poke & Tone; Pearson^{[a]}; Southwell^{[b]}	6:15

Notes

- ^{^[a]} denotes co-producer(s)

== Charts ==
=== Weekly charts ===
Weekly chart performance for "Seven Days"
Chart (1998)	Peak position
Australia (ARIA)	195
Europe (Eurochart Hot 100)	98
Scotland Singles (OCC)	76
UK Singles (OCC)	22
UK Dance (OCC)	8
UK Hip Hop/R&B (OCC)	7
US Radio Songs (Billboard)	71
US R&B/Hip-Hop Airplay (Billboard)	3

=== Year-end charts ===
Year-end chart performance for "Seven Days"
Chart (1998)	Position
UK Urban (Music Week)	19
