= Mary Jane (All Night Long) =

Single by Mary J. Blige

from the album My Life
- Released: February 8, 1995
- Length: 4:41
- Label: Uptown; MCA
- Songwriters: Mary J. Blige; Sean "Puffy" Combs; Chucky Thompson; Rick James
- Producers: Sean Combs; Chucky Thompson

Mary J. Blige singles chronology
"I'm Going Down" (1995)	"Mary Jane (All Night Long)" (1995)	"I'll Be There for You/You're All I Need to Get By" (1995)

"Mary Jane (All Night Long)" is a song by American singer-songwriter Mary J. Blige. It was written by Blige, Chucky Thompson and Sean "Puffy" Combs for her second studio album, My Life (1994), while production was helmed by Combs and Thompson. The song is built around a sample of the 1983 song "All Night Long" by American girl group Mary Jane Girls and "Close the Door" from 1978 by American singer Teddy Pendergrass. Due to the inclusion of the sample, Rick James is also credited as songwriter.

Released as the album's third single, "Mary Jane (All Night Long)" peaked at number 37 on the US Hot R&B/Hip-Hop Airplay chart and became a top twenty single on the UK Singles Chart, where it reached number 17. The official remix for "Mary Jane (All Night Long)" features rapper LL Cool J. The remix version was later included on Blige's compilation HERStory, Vol. 1 (2019) and My Life — 25th Anniversary Edition (2020). A music video for the song was never made.

== Critical reception ==
Larry Flick from Billboard magazine complimented the song as "another pearl" from the queen of hip-hop soul's "current masterpiece", My Life. He remarked that "this sexy homage to the Mary Janes Girls' evergreen 'All Night Long' demands immediate turntable attention. [...] If there is a realistic candidate to be the Gladys Knight or Billie Holiday for our generation, Blige is it. No voice is as brutally honest or evocative." Chuck Campbell from Knoxville News Sentinel noted its "controlled vocals and less-is-more music".

A reviewer from Music Week gave the song a full score of five out of five and named it an "sassy reworking", writing, "With Sean 'Puffy' Combs and Bottom Dollar on remix duty, this is one classy track." James Hamilton from the Record Mirror Dance Update deemed it an "excellent slower but similar remake" in his weekly dance column. Jonathan Bernstein from Spin noted that Blige "kickstarts" the record with the "thumping lilt" of the Mary Jane Girls song, "presented as her own composition."

== Track listings ==
- UK 12" single – MCST 2088
1. "Mary Jane (All Night Long)" (Album version) – 4:37
2. "Mary Jane (All Night Long)" (Bottom Dollar House Vocal) – 7:56
3. "Mary Jane (All Night Long)" (Soul Power Roller Skate Mix) – 5:04
4. "I'm Goin' Down" (Remix) – 3:47
- UK CD single – MCSTD 2088
1. "Mary Jane (All Night Long)" (Radio Mix) – 3:40
2. "Mary Jane (All Night Long)" (Album version) – 4:37
3. "Mary Jane (All Night Long)" (Soul Power Roller Skate Mix) – 5:04
4. "Mary Jane (All Night Long)" (Bottom Dollar House Vocal) – 7:56
5. "Mary Jane (All Night Long)" (Soul Power Mix) – 5:55
- UK Cassette single – MCSTC 2088
1. "Mary Jane (All Night Long)" (Radio Mix) – 3:40
2. "Mary Jane (All Night Long)" (Soul Power Roller Skate Mix) – 5:04

== Credits and personnel ==
Credits adapted from the My Life liner notes.

- Mary J. Blige – vocals
- Rich Travali - recording engineer
- Tony Maserati - audio mixing
- Chucky Thompson – additional instruments

== Charts ==
=== Weekly charts ===
Chart (1995)	Peak position
Europe (Eurochart Hot 100)	57
New Zealand (Recorded Music NZ)	33
Scotland Singles (OCC)	63
UK Singles (OCC)	17
UK Dance (OCC)	3
UK Hip Hop/R&B (OCC)	4
US R&B/Hip-Hop Airplay (Billboard)	37

=== Year-end charts ===
Chart (1995)	Position
UK Club Chart (Music Week)	79

== Certifications ==
Region	Certification	Certified units/sales
New Zealand (RMNZ)	Gold	15,000^{‡}
^{‡} Sales+streaming figures based on certification alone.
