= Missing You (Mary J. Blige song) =

1997 single by Mary J. Blige

Single by Mary J. Blige

from the album Share My World
- Released: November 17, 1997
- Genre: Soul; gospel
- Length: 4:19
- Label: MCA
- Songwriter: Babyface
- Producer: Babyface

Mary J. Blige singles chronology
"Everything" (1997)	"Missing You" (1997)	"Seven Days" (1998)

"Missing You" is a song by American singer Mary J. Blige. It was written and produced by Babyface for her third studio album, Share My World (1997). In the United Kingdom, the song was released as the album's third single in November 1997, when it reached number 19 on the UK Singles Chart. The song was not serviced to US radio until July 1998. "Missing You" features background vocals from singer Shanice and talks about a woman in a dilemma over a relationship with a man who she at first claimed she "wasn't in love" with but then finds herself "thinking about him all the time" and her missing him.

== Critical reception ==
Larry Flick of Billboard wrote that "the song deftly illustrates two notably different sides of La Blige. In its original form, she is the picture of quiet strength, letting producer/writer Babyface drive the pleading ballad to radio-friendly effect. In a live setting, Blige unleashes a white-knuckled intensity that no producer has fully captured yet. She rips through the song with a fervor that is reminiscent of a young Gladys Knight, breathing tangible subtext into every syllable. Also, the live arrangement breaks the track down to a '70s-styled soul throwdown that will educate Bilge's young fans, while delighting mature listeners to no end." Jonathan Bernstein from Entertainment Weekly described it as "an atypically tart country-blues lament", noting that it "features a choir of aching Mary J.’s." A reviewer from Music Week gave the song three out of five, adding that "this touching, torch-like ballad could be just the single to cross Blige over to a wider audience." The magazine's Alan Jones stated that the singer's "reign as the Queen of Hip Hop Soul is likely to continue with the release of Missing You, a gorgeous new Babyface song with gospel undertones."

== Track listings ==
- CD 1
1. "Missing You" (album version)
2. "I Can Love You" (album version)
3. "Missing You" (Curtis and Moore club remix)
4. "I Can Love You" (Brooklyn Funk R&B mix)
- CD 2
1. "Missing You" (Curtis and Moore radio edit)
2. "Everything" (So So Def remix)
3. "Everything" (Malik mix)
4. "Don't Walk Away"

== Personnel ==
Personnel are adapted from the Share My World liner notes.

- Babyface – production, writing
- Mary J. Blige – executive production, vocals
- Nathan East – bass
- Jon Gass – mixing
- Shanice Wilson – backing vocals

== Charts ==
=== Weekly charts ===
Chart (1997)	Peak position
Scottish Singles Sales (Official Charts)	41
UK Singles (Official Charts)	19
UK Hip Hop/R&B (Official Charts)	6
US R&B/Hip-Hop Airplay (Billboard)	23

=== Year-end charts ===
Chart (1997)	Position
UK Urban (Music Week)	28

== Release history ==
Region	Date	Format(s)	Label(s)	Ref.
United Kingdom	November 17, 1997	CD; cassette	MCA	
United States	July 7, 1998	Rhythmic contemporary; urban radio	MCA	
