= Mary J. Blige discography =

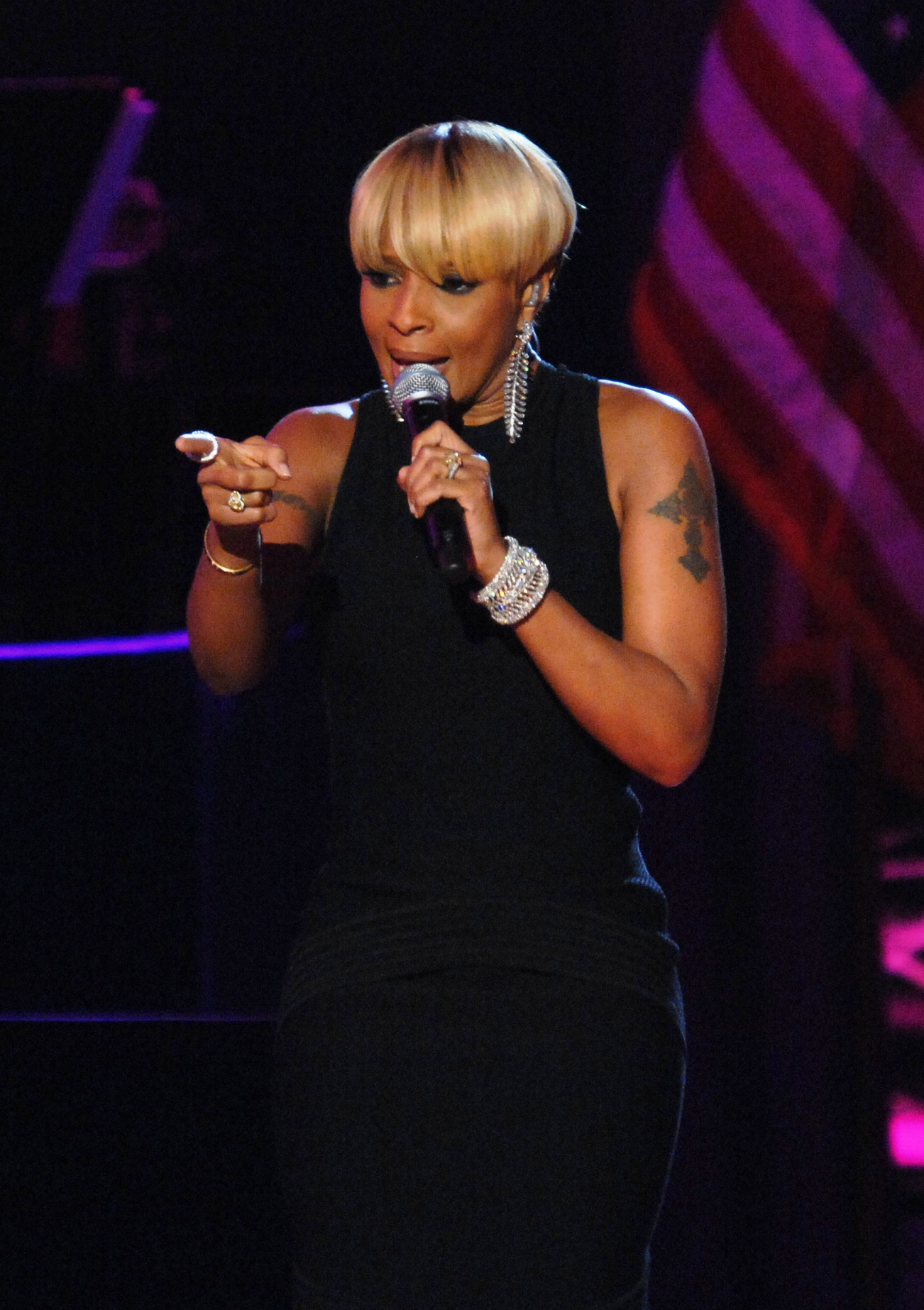
- Blige performing at the Neighborhood Ball in 2009
- Studio albums: 15
- Soundtrack albums: 1
- Live albums: 2
- Compilation albums: 9
- Singles: 83

American singer Mary J. Blige began her career as a backing vocalist for Uptown Records in the early 1990s. In a career spanning more than 30 years, she has released 15 studio albums and 83 singles—including more than 20 as a featured artist. The "Queen of Hip-Hop Soul" and The "Queen of R&B" has sold an estimate of over 100 million records worldwide, and over 20 million in the United States alone. Billboard ranked Blige as the 18th Greatest Billboard 200 Woman of all time, the 45th Greatest Hot 100 Woman of all time and 88th Greatest Artist of all time.

In 2009, Billboard ranked Blige as the most successful female R&B/hip-hop artist of the past 25 years. In March 2017, Billboard magazine ranked her 2006 song "Be Without You" as the most successful R&B/hip-hop song of all time, as it spent an unparalleled 75 weeks on the Hot R&B/Hip-Hop Songs chart, 15 of those weeks at number one. In 2011, VH1 ranked Blige as the 80th greatest artist of all time. Moreover, she was ranked 100th on the list of "100 Greatest Singers of All Time" by Rolling Stone magazine. In 2012, VH1 ranked Blige ninth among "The 100 Greatest Woman in Music" listing.

Blige started her own musical career in 1992, releasing her multi-platinum-selling debut album, What's the 411? on MCA and Uptown Records. The album gave Blige her first Billboard 200 top-ten album, and has since launched an additional 12 studio albums in the top ten on this chart. Among Blige's most popular songs to date are "Family Affair", "Real Love", "Not Gon' Cry" and "Be Without You". Blige has had four Billboard Hot 100 top-ten singles as a lead artist in the United States, and has had a total of sixteen top-forty charting singles in the United States. She has had forty-two singles charting on the Billboard Hot 100, making Blige one of the best-performing artists to date on the chart.

== Albums ==
=== Studio albums ===
List of studio albums, with selected chart positions, sales figures and certifications
Title	Album details	Peak chart positions										Sales	Certifications
Title	Album details	US	US R&B	AUS	AUT	CAN	FRA	GER	NLD	SWI	UK	Sales	Certifications
What's the 411?	Released: July 28, 1992; Label: Uptown, MCA; Formats: CD, LP, cassette, digital download	6	1	—	—	—	—	—	—	—	53	US: 3,500,000	RIAA: 4× Platinum; BPI: Silver
My Life	Released: November 29, 1994; Re-issues: November 20, 2020; Label: Uptown, MCA; Formats: CD, LP, cassette, digital download	7	1	111	—	37	—	—	69	—	59	US: 2,800,000	RIAA: 3× Platinum; BPI: Gold; MC: Gold
Share My World	Released: April 22, 1997; Label: MCA; Formats: CD, LP, cassette, digital download	1	1	71	—	4	31	37	11	41	8	US: 2,800,000; US: 559,000 (BMG Music Club)	RIAA: 3× Platinum; BPI: Gold; MC: Platinum
Mary	Released: August 17, 1999; Label: MCA; Formats: CD, LP, cassette, digital download	2	1	66	—	5	51	38	20	16	5	US: 2,100,000	RIAA: 2× Platinum; BPI: Gold; MC: Gold
No More Drama	Released: August 28, 2001; Label: MCA; Formats: CD, LP, cassette, digital download	2	1	36	17	5	8	13	9	7	4	US: 3,100,000; UK: 578,500	RIAA: 3× Platinum; BPI: Platinum; BVMI: Gold; IFPI SWI: Platinum; MC: 2× Platinum; NVPI: Gold; SNEP: Gold
Love & Life	Released: August 26, 2003; Label: Geffen; Formats: CD, LP, cassette, digital download	1	1	62	49	6	18	21	22	3	8	US: 1,000,000	RIAA: Platinum; BPI: Gold
The Breakthrough	Released: December 20, 2005; Label: Matriarch, Geffen; Formats: CD, LP, cassette, digital download	1	1	19	42	13	25	28	12	7	22	US: 3,100,000	RIAA: 3× Platinum; ARIA: Gold; BPI: Gold; BVMI: Gold; IFPI SWI: Platinum
Growing Pains	Released: December 18, 2007; Label: Matriarch, Geffen; Formats: CD, LP, digital download	1	1	146	36	41	73	32	31	6	6	US: 1,600,000	RIAA: Platinum; BPI: Silver
Stronger with Each Tear	Release: December 21, 2009; Label: Matriarch, Geffen; Formats: CD, LP, digital download	2	1	—	—	42	—	—	89	66	33	US: 950,000	RIAA: Gold
My Life II... The Journey Continues (Act 1)	Released: November 21, 2011; Label: Matriarch, Geffen; Formats: CD, LP, digital download	5	2	177	—	—	143	93	95	31	76	US: 800,000	RIAA: Gold
A Mary Christmas	Released: October 15, 2013; Label: Matriarch, Verve; Formats: CD, LP, digital download	10	2	—	—	—	—	—	96	—	28	US: 328,000	RIAA: Gold
The London Sessions	Released: November 24, 2014; Label: Matriarch, Capitol; Formats: CD, LP, digital download	9	1	111	—	—	113	—	94	27	40		
Strength of a Woman	Released: April 28, 2017; Label: Matriarch, Capitol; Formats: CD, LP, digital download	3	2	100	—	22	170	—	—	63	54	US: 165,000	
Good Morning Gorgeous	Released: February 11, 2022; Label: Mary Jane, 300; Formats: CD, digital download	14	9	—	—	—	—	—	—	56	— (Note: Good Morning Gorgeous did not enter the UK Albums chart, but peaked at number 24 on the UK Album Downloads Chart.)		
Gratitude	Released: November 15, 2024; Label: Mary Jane, 300; Formats: CD, digital download	—	—	—	—	—	—	—	—	—	— (Note: Gratitude did not enter the UK Albums chart, but peaked at number 36 on the UK Album Downloads Chart.)		
"—" denotes an album that did not chart or was not released in that territory.

=== Soundtrack albums ===
List of soundtrack albums, with selected chart positions, sales figures and certifications
Title	Album details	Peak chart positions	
Title	Album details	US	US R&B
Think Like a Man Too	Released: July 14, 2014; Label: Epic; Formats: CD, digital download	30	1

=== Compilations ===
List of studio albums, with selected chart positions, sales figures and certifications
Title	Album details	Peak chart positions										Certifications
Title	Album details	US	US R&B	AUS	AUT	CAN	FRA	NLD	SWI	UK	UK R&B	Certifications
What's the 411? Remix	Released: December 7, 1993; Label: Uptown/MCA	118	22	—	—	—	—	—	—	—	—	RIAA: Gold
The Tour	Released: July 28, 1998; Label: MCA	21	7	—	—	—	65	68	—	—	18	RIAA: Gold
Ballads	Released: December 20, 2000; Label: MCA	—	—	—	—	—	—	—	—	—	—	
Dance for Me	Released: August 13, 2002; Label: MCA	76	36	—	—	47	—	—	—	—	—	
My Collection of Love Songs	Released: January 1, 2006; Label: Matriarch/Geffen	—	—	—	—	—	—	—	—	—	—	
Mary J. Blige & Friends	Released: November 14, 2006; Label: Matriarch/Geffen	95	8	—	—	—	—	—	—	—	—	
Reflections (A Retrospective)	Released: December 12, 2006; Label: Matriarch/Geffen	9	2	134	75	60	—	12	19	40	7	BPI: Platinum
Soul Is Forever: The Remix Album	Released: June 2, 2008 (UK); Label: RGS Entertainment	—	—	—	—	—	—	—	—	—	—	
Herstory Vol. 1	Released: December 6, 2019; Label: Geffen, UMe	—	— (Note: Herstory Vol. 1 did not enter the Top R&B/Hip-Hop Albums chart, but peaked at number six on the R&B Album Sales chart.)	—	—	—	—	—	—	—	—	
"—" denotes an album that did not chart or was not released in that territory.

== Singles ==
=== As lead artist ===
==== 1990s ====
List of singles as lead artist, with selected chart positions and certifications, showing year released and album name
Single	Year	Peak chart positions										Certifications	Album
Single	Year	US	US R&B /HH	AUS	FRA	GER	NLD	NZ	SWE	SWI	UK	Certifications	Album
"You Remind Me"	1992	29	1	—	—	—	—	—	—	—	90	RIAA: Gold	What's the 411?
"Real Love"	1992	7	1	—	—	—	—	—	—	—	68	RIAA: Gold; BPI: Silver; RMNZ: Gold	What's the 411?
"Reminisce"	1992	57	6	192	—	—	—	—	—	—	31		What's the 411?
"Sweet Thing"	1993	28	11	—	—	—	—	48	—	—	—		What's the 411?
"Love No Limit"	1993	44	5	—	—	—	—	—	—	—	—		What's the 411?
"You Remind Me" (remix)	1993	—	—	—	—	—	—	—	—	—	48		What's the 411?
"Real Love" (remix)	1993	—	—	—	—	—	—	—	—	—	26		What's the 411?
"You Don't Have to Worry"	1993	63	11	—	—	—	—	—	—	—	36		Who's the Man?: Original Motion Picture Soundtrack
"I Don't Want to Do Anything" (featuring K-Ci Hailey)	1993	—	86	—	—	—	—	—	—	—	—		What's the 411?
"My Love" (Note: Song was not released in the US as a commercial single but was issued as a full, physical single release in the UK.)	1994	—	23	—	—	—	—	—	—	—	29		What's the 411? Remix
"Be Happy"	1994	29	6	76	—	—	—	—	—	—	30		My Life
"I'm Goin' Down"	1995	22	13	—	—	—	—	—	—	—	12		My Life
"Mary Jane (All Night Long)"	1995	—	—	—	—	—	—	33	—	—	17	RMNZ: Gold	My Life
"You Bring Me Joy"	1995	57	29	—	—	—	—	—	—	—	—		My Life
"I Love You"	1995	57	29	—	—	—	—	—	—	—	—		My Life
"(You Make Me Feel like) a Natural Woman"	1995	95	39	127	—	—	36	15	—	—	23		New York Undercover soundtrack
"Not Gon' Cry"	1996	2	1	164	—	—	—	12	—	—	39	RIAA: Platinum	Waiting to Exhale: Original Soundtrack Album
"Love Is All We Need" (featuring Nas)	1997	—	—	—	—	—	90	7	31	—	15		Share My World
"I Can Love You" (featuring Lil' Kim)	1997	21	2	—	—	—	—	—	—	—	—		Share My World
"Everything"	1997	24	5	125	—	—	46	13	—	—	6	BPI: Silver	Share My World
"Missing You"	1997	—	—	—	—	—	—	—	—	—	19		Share My World
"Seven Days"	1998	—	—	195	—	—	—	—	—	—	22		Share My World
"As" (with George Michael)	1999	—	57	45	27	38	7	21	27	22	4	BPI: Gold	Mary
"All That I Can Say"	1999	44	6	—	—	—	60	—	—	—	29		Mary
"Deep Inside"	1999	51	9	—	—	—	40	—	—	—	42		Mary
"Your Child"	1999	— (Note: "Your Child" did not enter the Billboard Hot 100, but peaked at number six on the Bubbling Under Hot 100 Singles chart.)	23	—	—	—	—	—	—	—	—		Mary
"—" denotes a recording that did not chart or was not released in that territory.

==== 2000s ====
List of singles as lead artist, with selected chart positions and certifications, showing year released and album name
Single	Year	Peak chart positions										Certifications	Album
Single	Year	US	US R&B /HH	AUS	FRA	GER	NLD	NZ	SWE	SWI	UK	Certifications	Album
"Give Me You"	2000	68	21	58	—	76	77	—	—	64	19		Mary
"Family Affair"	2001	1	1	8	1	10	3	2	7	4	8	ARIA: Platinum; BPI: 2× Platinum; BVMI: Platinum; GLF: Gold; IFPI SWI: Platinum; RMNZ: 4× Platinum; SNEP: Gold	No More Drama
"No More Drama"	2001	15	16	30	42	47	12	38	29	17	9	BPI: Silver	No More Drama
"Dance for Me"	2002	—	—	66	82	82	29	—	44	50	13		No More Drama
"Rainy Dayz" (featuring Ja Rule)	2002	12	8	—	—	58	8	29	55	65	17		No More Drama
"Love @ 1st Sight" (with Method Man)	2003	22	10	32	49	36	46	27	23	23	18		Love & Life
"Ooh!"	2003	29	14	—	—	—	—	—	—	—	—		Love & Life
"Not Today" (featuring Eve)	2003	41	21	—	57	—	—	—	—	—	40	RIAA: Platinum (Video single)	Love & Life
"Whenever I Say Your Name" (with Sting)	2003	—	77	—	—	—	—	—	—	50	60		Love & Life
"It's a Wrap"	2004	—	71	—	—	—	—	—	—	—	—		Love & Life
"Be Without You"	2005	3	1	30	22	12	—	9	34	5	32	RIAA: 2× Platinum; BPI: Gold; RMNZ: Platinum	The Breakthrough
"One" (with U2)	2006	86	—	118	35	6	2	—	27	2	2	BPI: Gold; BVMI: Platinum; GLF: Gold	The Breakthrough
"Enough Cryin"	2006	32	2	—	—	88	52	—	—	—	46		The Breakthrough
"Take Me as I Am"	2006	58	3	—	—	—	—	—	—	—	—		The Breakthrough
"MJB da MVP" (Note: "MJB da MVP" was played briefly by radio in the US in 2005 before the first official single from The Breakthrough, "Be Without You", was released. It was the only single from Mary J. Blige's Reflections (A Retrospective) album in the UK.) (featuring 50 Cent)	2006	75	19	—	—	—	—	—	—	—	33		The Breakthrough
"We Ride (I See the Future)"	2006	— (Note: "We Ride (I See the Future)" did not enter the Billboard Hot 100, but peaked at number 18 on the Bubbling Under R&B/Hip-Hop Singles chart.)	38	—	—	69	53	—	—	—	—		Reflections (A Retrospective)
"Just Fine"	2007	22	3	—	—	—	54	—	—	—	16	BPI: Silver; RMNZ: Gold	Growing Pains
"Work That"	2008	65	16	—	—	—	—	—	—	—	—		Growing Pains
"Stay Down"	2008	—	34	—	—	—	—	—	—	—	—		Growing Pains
"Stronger"	2009	—	84	—	—	—	—	—	—	—	—		More than a Game soundtrack
"The One" (featuring Drake)	2009	63	32	—	—	—	—	—	—	—	—		Stronger with Each Tear
"I Am"	2009	55	4	—	—	—	—	—	—	—	34		Stronger with Each Tear
"—" denotes a recording that did not chart or was not released in that territory.

==== 2010s ====
List of singles as lead artist, with selected chart positions and certifications, showing year released and album name
Single	Year	Peak chart positions								Certifications	Album
Single	Year	US	US R&B /HH	US Adult R&B	FRA	ITA	KOR Int.	UK	UK R&B	Certifications	Album
"Each Tear"	2010	—	—	—	—	1	20	183	—	FIMI: Platinum	Stronger with Each Tear
"We Got Hood Love" (featuring Trey Songz)	2010	—	25	14	—	—	58	—	—		Stronger with Each Tear
"Someone to Love Me (Naked)" (featuring Diddy & Lil Wayne)	2011	— (Note: "Someone to Love Me (Naked)" did not enter the Billboard Hot 100, but peaked at number eight on the Bubbling Under Hot 100 Singles chart.)	28	—	—	—	—	—	—		My Life II... The Journey Continues (Act 1)
"25/8"	2011	—	35	8	—	—	—	—	—		My Life II... The Journey Continues (Act 1)
"Mr. Wrong" (featuring Drake)	2011	87	10	—	—	—	—	—	—		My Life II... The Journey Continues (Act 1)
"The Living Proof"	2011	—	—	27	—	—	—	—	—		My Life II... The Journey Continues (Act 1)
"Why" (featuring Rick Ross)	2012	—	30	—	—	—	—	—	—		My Life II... The Journey Continues (Act 1)
"Don't Mind"	2012	—	35	3	—	—	—	—	—		My Life II... The Journey Continues (Act 1)
"This Christmas"	2013	— (Note: "This Christmas" did not enter the Billboard Hot 100, but peaked at number 65 on the Holiday 100 chart.)	—	21	—	—	—	—	—		A Mary Christmas
"Do You Hear What I Hear?" (featuring Jessie J)	2013	—	—	—	—	—	—	59	7		A Mary Christmas
"Suitcase"	2014	—	—	29	—	—	—	—	—		Think Like a Man Too
"Therapy"	2014	—	—	28	—	—	—	—	—		The London Sessions
"Right Now"	2014	—	—	—	87	—	—	100	13		The London Sessions
"Whole Damn Year"	2014	—	21	5	—	—	—	—	—		The London Sessions
"Doubt"	2015	—	37	8	—	—	—	—	—		The London Sessions
"Thick of It"	2016	— (Note: "Thick of It" did not enter the Billboard Hot 100, but peaked at number 17 on the Bubbling Under Hot 100 Singles chart.)	47	1	—	—	—	—	—		Strength of a Woman
"U + Me (Love Lesson)"	2017	—	— (Note: "U + Me (Love Lesson)" did not enter the Billboard Hot R&B/Hip-Hop Songs chart, but peaked at number 11 on the R&B/Hip-Hop Airplay chart.)	1	—	—	—	—	—		Strength of a Woman
"Love Yourself" (featuring Kanye West)	2017	—	— (Note: "Love Yourself" did not enter the Billboard Hot R&B/Hip-Hop Songs chart, but peaked at number 34 on the R&B/Hip-Hop Airplay chart.)	11	—	—	—	—	—		Strength of a Woman
"Set Me Free"	2017	—	— (Note: "Set Me Free" did not enter the Billboard Hot R&B/Hip-Hop Songs chart, but peaked at number 31 on the R&B/Hip-Hop Airplay chart.)	8	—	—	—	—	—		Strength of a Woman
"Only Love"	2018	—	— (Note: "Only Love" did not enter the Billboard Hot R&B/Hip-Hop Songs chart, but peaked at number 24 on the R&B/Hip-Hop Airplay chart.)	5	—	—	—	—	—		Non-album singles
"Thriving" (featuring Nas)	2019	—	— (Note: "Thriving" did not enter the Billboard Hot R&B/Hip-Hop Songs chart, but peaked at number 37 on the R&B/Hip-Hop Airplay chart.)	21	—	—	—	—	—		Non-album singles
"Know"	2019	—	— (Note: "Know" did not enter the Billboard Hot R&B/Hip-Hop Songs chart, but peaked at number 41 on the R&B/Hip-Hop Airplay chart.)	12	—	—	—	—	—		Non-album singles
"—" denotes a recording that did not chart or was not released in that territory.

==== 2020s ====
List of singles as lead artist, with selected chart positions and certifications, showing year released and album name
Single	Year	Peak chart positions			Certifications	Album
Single	Year	US	US R&B /HH	US Adult R&B	Certifications	Album
"Always" (with Waze & Odyssey, George Michael and Tommy Theo)	2020	—	—	—		Non-album single
"Good Morning Gorgeous"	2021	83	33	1	RIAA: Gold	Good Morning Gorgeous
"Amazing" (featuring DJ Khaled)	2021	—	— (Note: "Amazing" did not enter the Billboard Hot R&B/Hip-Hop Songs chart, but peaked at number 24 on the R&B/Hip-Hop Digital Songs chart.)	—		Good Morning Gorgeous
"Rent Money" (featuring Dave East)	2022	—	— (Note: "Rent Money" did not enter the Billboard Hot R&B/Hip-Hop Songs chart, but peaked at number 19 on the Hot R&B Songs chart.)	—		Good Morning Gorgeous
"Here with Me" (featuring Anderson .Paak)	2022	—	— (Note: "Here with Me" did not enter the Billboard Hot R&B/Hip-Hop Songs chart, but peaked at number 19 on the R&B/Hip-Hop Airplay chart.)	4		Good Morning Gorgeous
"Still Believe in Love" (featuring Vado)	2023	—	— (Note: "Still Believe in Love" did not enter the Billboard Hot R&B/Hip-Hop Songs chart, but peaked at number 12 on the R&B/Hip-Hop Airplay chart.)	1		Non-album singles
"Beautiful Life All Stars" (featuring Vado)	2024	—	—	—		Non-album singles
"Christmas Without You"	2024	—	—	—		Non-album singles
"Breathing" (featuring Fabolous)	2024	—	— (Note: "Breathing" did not enter the Billboard Hot R&B/Hip-Hop Songs chart, but peaked at number 13 on the R&B/Hip-Hop Airplay chart.)	1		Gratitude
"You Ain't the Only One"	2024	—	— (Note: "You Ain't the Only One" did not enter the Billboard Hot R&B/Hip-Hop Songs chart, but peaked at number 18 on the R&B/Hip-Hop Airplay chart.)	1		Gratitude
"More Than a Lover"	2026	—	—	—		Non-album singles
"Want Love"	2026	—	—	—		Non-album singles
"—" denotes a recording that did not chart or was not released in that territory.

=== As a featured artist ===
List of singles as a featured artist, with selected chart positions and certifications, showing year released and album name
Single	Year	Peak chart positions										Certifications	Album
Single	Year	US	US R&B /HH	AUS	GER	IRE	NLD	NZ	SWE	SWI	UK	Certifications	Album
"Check It Out" (Grand Puba featuring Mary J. Blige)	1992	— (Note: "Check It Out" did not enter the Billboard Hot 100, but peaked at number ten on the Bubbling Under Hot 100 Singles chart.)	85	—	—	—	—	—	—	—	—		Reel to Reel
"I'll Be There for You/You're All I Need to Get By" (Method Man featuring Mary J. Blige)	1995	3	1	—	100	—	36	22	—	—	10	RIAA: Platinum	Tical
"Can't Knock the Hustle" (Jay-Z featuring Mary J. Blige)	1996	73	35	—	—	—	—	26	—	—	30		Reasonable Doubt
"Lean on Me" (Kirk Franklin featuring Mary J. Blige & The Family)	1999	79	26	—	—	—	57	27	—	—	—		The Nu Nation Project
"911" (Wyclef Jean featuring Mary J. Blige)	2000	38	6	—	12	10	8	—	1	9	9	BPI: Silver; GLF: Gold	The Ecleftic: 2 Sides II a Book
"Back 2 Life 2001" (DJ Clue featuring Mary J. Blige & Jadakiss)	2001	—	57	—	—	—	—	—	—	—	—		The Professional 2
"Come Close" (Common featuring Mary J. Blige)	2002	65	21	—	—	—	—	—	—	—	—		Electric Circus
"I Try" (Talib Kweli featuring Mary J. Blige)	2004	—	77	—	—	—	—	—	—	—	59		The Beautiful Struggle
"Ain't No Way" (Patti LaBelle featuring Mary J. Blige)	2005	—	62	—	—	—	—	—	—	—	—		Classic Moments
"Be Easy" (Young Hot Rod featuring Mary J. Blige)	2006	—	91	—	—	—	—	—	—	—	—		Fastlane
"Runaway Love" (Ludacris featuring Mary J. Blige)	2006	2	3	—	—	—	—	21	—	—	52	RIAA: Platinum	Release Therapy
"Wake Up Call (Mark Ronson remix)" (Maroon 5 featuring Mary J. Blige)	2007	—	—	—	—	—	—	—	—	—	—		Call and Response: The Remix Album and Soul Is Forever: The Remix Album
"Disrespectful" (Chaka Khan featuring Mary J. Blige)	2007	—	—	—	—	—	—	—	—	—	—		Funk This
"You're All Welcome" (Jay-Z featuring Mary J. Blige)	2007	—	55	—	—	—	—	—	—	—	—		Non-album singles
"Just Stand Up!" (with Various Artists)	2008	11	83	39	—	11	—	19	51	—	26	RIAA: 2× Platinum (Video single)	Non-album singles
"IfULeave" (Musiq Soulchild featuring Mary J. Blige)	2008	71	8	—	—	—	—	—	—	—	—		OnMyRadio
"Sumthin's Gotta Give" (Big Boi featuring Mary J. Blige)	2008	—	83	—	—	—	—	—	—	—	—		Non-album single
"Remember Me" (T.I. featuring Mary J. Blige)	2009	29	42	—	—	19	—	—	—	—	34		Paper Trail: Case Closed
"This Is to Mother You" (Sinéad O'Connor featuring Mary J. Blige)	2009	—	—	—	—	—	—	—	—	—	—		Non-album singles
"It's Coming" (Latonya Blige featuring Mary J. Blige)	2009	—	—	—	—	—	—	—	—	—	—		Non-album singles
"Hard Times Come Again No More" (The Roots featuring Mary J. Blige)	2010	—	—	—	—	—	—	—	—	—	—		Hope for Haiti Now
"Bridge over Troubled Water" (Andrea Bocelli with Mary J. Blige)	2010	75	—	—	—	—	—	—	—	—	—		Non-album single
"It Ain't Over Til It's Over" (DJ Khaled featuring Mary J. Blige, Fabolous & Jadakiss)	2011	—	—	—	—	—	—	—	—	—	—		We the Best Forever
"F for You" (Disclosure featuring Mary J. Blige)	2014	—	—	—	—	—	—	—	—	—	22		Settle
"Hands" (Various Artists for Orlando)	2016	—	—	—	—	—	—	—	—	—	—		Non-album singles
"Where's the Love?" (The Black Eyed Peas featuring The World)	2016	—	—	15	39	—	68	—	—	41	47		Non-album singles
"—" denotes a recording that did not chart or was not released in that territory.

== Other charted and certified songs ==
List of other charted and certified songs, with selected chart positions and certifications, showing year released and album name
Title	Year	Peak chart positions						Certifications	Album
Title	Year	US R&B /HH	US AC	US Dance	US Holiday Dig.	KOR Int.	SWI	Certifications	Album
"Beautiful"	1998	72	—	—	—	—	—		How Stella Got Her Groove Back Soundtrack
"Sincerity" (featuring Nas & DMX)	1999	72	—	—	—	—	—		Mary
"Confrontation" (Funkmaster Flex and Big Kap featuring Mary J. Blige)	1999	81	—	—	—	—	—		The Tunnel and Mary
"Let No Man Put Asunder"	1999	—	—	20	—	—	—		Mary
"Someday at Christmas"	1999	87	—	—	—	—	—		My Christmas Album
"He Think I Don't Know"	2002	—	—	15	—	—	—		No More Drama
"Hooked" (featuring P. Diddy)	2003	54	—	—	—	—	—		—N/a
"Love & Life Intro" (Mary J. Blige featuring Jay-Z and P. Diddy)	2003	— (Note: "Love & Life Intro" did not enter the Hot R&B/Hip-Hop Songs chart, but peaked at number 21 on the Bubbling Under R&B/Hip-Hop Singles chart, which acts as a 25-song extension to the R&B/Hip-Hop Songs chart.)	—	—	—	—	—		Love & Life
"Baggage"	2005	— (Note: "Baggage" did not enter the Hot R&B/Hip-Hop Songs chart, but peaked at number 4 on the Bubbling Under R&B/Hip-Hop Singles chart, which acts as a 25-song extension to the R&B/Hip-Hop Songs chart.)	—	—	—	—	—		The Breakthrough
"Ain't Really Love"	2005	73	—	—	—	—	—		The Breakthrough
"Turn Off the Lights" (Mary J. Blige featuring Jay-Z)	2006	— (Note: "Turn Off the Lights" did not enter the Hot R&B/Hip-Hop Songs chart, but peaked at number 15 on the Bubbling Under R&B/Hip-Hop Singles chart, which acts as a 25-song extension to the R&B/Hip-Hop Songs chart.)	—	—	—	—	—		—N/a
"Hurt Again"	2007	55	—	—	—	—	—		Growing Pains
"You're Welcome" (Jay-Z featuring Mary J. Blige)	2008	55	—	—	—	—	—		—N/a
"I Feel Good"	2009	68	—	—	—	97	—		Stronger with Each Tear
"Good Love" (featuring T.I.)	2009	56	—	—	—	15	—		Stronger with Each Tear
"In the Morning"	2009	—	—	—	—	99	—		Stronger with Each Tear
"Feel Inside" (featuring Nas)	2011	— (Note: "Feel Inside" did not enter the Hot R&B/Hip-Hop Songs chart, but peaked at number 6 on the Bubbling Under R&B/Hip-Hop Singles chart, which acts as a 25-song extension to the R&B/Hip-Hop Songs chart.)	—	—	—	—	—		My Life II... The Journey Continues (Act 1)
"Ain't Nobody"	2011	—	—	—	—	—	55		My Life II... The Journey Continues (Act 1)
"Love a Woman" (featuring Beyoncé)	2011	89	—	—	—	—	—		My Life II... The Journey Continues (Act 1)
"It's a Wrap" (remix) (Mariah Carey featuring Mary J. Blige)	2012	—	—	—	—	100	—	RMNZ: Gold	Angels Advocate
"My Favorite Things"	2013	—	13	—	—	—	—		A Mary Christmas
"When You Wish Upon a Star" (featuring Barbra Streisand and Chris Botti)	2013	—	—	—	10	—	—		A Mary Christmas
"The First Noel" (featuring The Clark Sisters)	2013	—	21	—	—	—	—		A Mary Christmas
"—" denotes a recording that did not chart or was not released in that territory.

== Guest appearances ==
List of non-single guest appearances, with other performing artists, showing year released and album name
Title	Year	Other performer(s)	Album
"I'll Do 4 U"	1990	Father MC	Father's Day
"Do the One, Two"	1992	Father MC	Close to You
"One Nite Stand"	1992	Father MC	Close to You
"Dolly My Baby"	1992	Super Cat	Don Dada
"Good Luvin'"	1992	Christopher Williams	Changes
"Trippin Out (remix)"	1992	Prince Markie Dee	Free
"Feel of Your Lips"	1994	Sista, Virginia Williams, K-Ci	4 All the Sistas Around da World
"Love Don't Live Here Anymore"	1995	Faith Evans	Faith
"Everlasting Love"	1995	—N/a	Rhythm of the Games: Olympic Games Album
"Touch Me, Tease Me"	1996	Case, Foxy Brown	Case / The Nutty Professor (soundtrack)
"All That I Got Is You" (album version)	1996	Ghostface Killah	Ironman
"I Used to Love Him"	1996	Lauryn Hill	The Miseducation of Lauryn Hill
"Christmas in the City"	1997	Angie Martinez	A Very Special Christmas 3
"That's the Way I Feel About You"	1998	Gerald Levert	Love & Consequences
"Coming From"	1998	DMX	Flesh of My Flesh, Blood of My Blood
"As"	1998	George Michael	Ladies & Gentlemen: The Best of George Michael
"The Message"	1999	Dr. Dre, Rell	2001
"Confrontation"	1999	Funkmaster Flex, Big Kap	The Tunnel
"Ain't No Way"	1999	Whitney Houston	Divas Live '99
"I'm Every Woman (Reprise)"	1999	W. Houston, Chaka Khan, Faith Hill, Brandy, LeAnn Rimes	Divas Live '99
"Hold On"	2000	Lil' Kim	The Notorious K.I.M.
"I Guess That's Why They Call It the Blues"	2000	Elton John	One Night Only
"There's Only One"	2001	Busta Rhymes	Genesis
"Little Bro/Little Sis"	2001	Malik Pendleton	Look Around
"Do Nothin' Till You Hear From Me"	2001	—N/a	Red Hot + Indigo
"Breathe"	2001	Angie Martinez, La India	Up Close and Personal
"Braveheart Party"	2001	Nas, Bravehearts	Stillmatic
"Can't Knock the Hustle"/"Family Affair"	2001	Jay-Z	Jay-Z: Unplugged
"Beauty and the Thug"	2002	Jaheim	Still Ghetto
"Heaven Somewhere"	2002	Common, Omar, C. Green, Bilal, J. Scott, E. Badu, L. Lynn	Electric Circus
"Whenever You Need Me"	2003	Nick Cannon	Nick Cannon
"Da Club"	2003	Diddy	—N/a
"Whenever I Say Your Name"	2003	Sting	Sacred Love
"Baby Girl Interlude"/"Intro""	2003	Missy Elliott	This Is Not a Test!
"Don't Worry"	2004	The Game	The Documentary
"On the Move"	2004	Rah Digga	Everything Is a Story
"I'm a Hustla (remix)"	2005	Cassidy	I'm a Hustla
"Tell Me Why"	2005	Will Smith	Lost and Found
"My Struggles"	2005	Missy Elliott, Grand Puba	The Cookbook
"It All Goes By So Fast"	2005	Ray Charles	Genius & Friends
"My Man"	2005	Santana, Big Boi	All That I Am
"Never Too Much"	2005	—N/a	So Amazing: An All-Star Tribute to Luther Vandross
"Living in Pain"	2005	Notorious B.I.G., 2Pac, Nas	Duets: The Final Chapter
"Love Changes"	2005	Jamie Foxx	Unpredictable
"Favorite Flavor"	2006	LL Cool J	Todd Smith
"It's Alright"	2006	Mobb Deep, 50 Cent	Blood Money
"Touch It (remix)"	2006	Busta Rhymes, Rah Digga, Missy Elliott, Lloyd Banks, Papoose, DMX	The Big Bang
"Making It Hard"	2006	Diddy	Press Play
"Hood Love"	2006	Johntá Austin	—N/a
"All of Me"	2007	50 Cent	Curtis
"What About the Baby"	2007	Wyclef Jean	Carnival Vol. II: Memoirs of an Immigrant
"Do You (remix)"	2007	Ne-Yo	Because of You
"Magic (NYC remix)"	2008	Robin Thicke	Something Else
"Change"	2008	T-Pain, Akon, Diddy	Thr33 Ringz
"Fancy"	2009	Drake	Thank Me Later
"Grind Hard"	2009	Jadakiss	The Last Kiss
"Decision"	2009	Busta Rhymes, Jamie Foxx, John Legend, Common	Back on My B.S.
"People"	2009	Queen Latifah	Persona
"The Way I Live"	2009	KRS-One & Buckshot	Survival Skills
"You Make Me Feel Brand New"	2009	Rod Stewart	Soulbook
"What Child Is This"	2009	Andrea Bocelli	My Christmas
"It's a Wrap (remix)"	2010	Mariah Carey	Angels Advocate
"Care (Demo Version)"	2010	Kid Rock, T.I.	Born Free
"Fancy" (remix)	2010	Drake, Swizz Beatz	—N/a
"Don't Play This Song"	2010	Kid Cudi	Man on the Moon II: The Legend of Mr. Rager
"These Worries"	2010	Kid Cudi	Man on the Moon II: The Legend of Mr. Rager
"Betcha Wouldn't Hurt Me"	2010	Quincy Jones, Q-Tip, Alfredo Rodríguez	Q Soul Bossa Nostra
"Each Tear"	2011	Rea Garvey	Can't Stand the Silence
"Reach Out"	2012	Nas	Life Is Good
"Who You're Around"	2012	Meek Mill	Dreams and Nightmares
"Now or Never"	2012	Kendrick Lamar	Good Kid, M.A.A.D City
"We Three Kings"	2012	Rod Stewart	Merry Christmas, Baby
"Being with You"	2014	Smokey Robinson	Smokey & Friends
"Very Best"	2015	Rick Ross	Black Market
"Overthinking"	2016	Romans	Overthinking Pt. 1
"Sorry Seems to Be the Hardest Word"	2018	—N/a	Revamp: Reimagining the Songs of Elton John & Bernie Taupin
"Lord Above"	2019	Fat Joe, Eminem	Family Ties
"Know How I Feel"	2020	Dave East	Karma 3
"You Will Never Find Another Me"	2020	Busta Rhymes	Extinction Level Event 2: The Wrath of God
"Spinnin"	2021	Jam & Lewis	Jam & Lewis: Volume One
"Diamond Life"	2021	Snoop Dogg, DJ Cassidy	Snoop Dogg Presents Algorithm
"I Like"	2023	Diddy	The Love Album: Off the Grid

== Soundtrack appearances ==
List of soundtrack appearances, with other performing artists, showing year released and album name
Title	Year	Other performer(s)	Film
"You Remind Me"	1991	—N/a	Strictly Business
"You Don't Have to Worry"	1993	—N/a	Who's the Man?
"(You Make Me Feel Like) A Natural Woman"	1995	—N/a	New York Undercover
"Freedom (Theme from Panther)"	1995	Various Artists	Panther
"Every Day It Rains"	1995	—N/a	The Show
"Not Gon' Cry"	1995	—N/a	Waiting to Exhale
"Touch Me, Tease Me"	1996	Case, Foxy Brown	The Nutty Professor
"A Dream"	1997	—N/a	Money Talks
"Beautiful"	1998	—N/a	How Stella Got Her Groove Back
"Our Love"	1998	—N/a	New York Undercover: A Night at Natalie's
"All I Need (Razor Sharp remix)"	2001	Method Man	How High
"Real Love"	2001	—N/a	Two Can Play That Game
"Star for Live"	2002	—N/a	Deliver Us from Eva
"Didn't Mean"	2003	—N/a	Bad Boys II
"Not Today"	2004	Eve	Barbershop 2: Back in Business
"Sorry Seems to Be the Hardest Word"	2004	—N/a	Bridget Jones: Edge of Reason
"Got to Be Real"	2004	Will Smith	Shark Tale
"Never Gonna Break My Faith"	2006	—N/a	Bobby
"Good Woman Down"	2006	Aretha Franklin	I Can Do Bad All By Myself
"I Can Do Bad"	2009	—N/a	I Can Do Bad All By Myself
"I Can See in Color"	2009	—N/a	Precious
"Stronger"	2009	—N/a	More than a Game
"The Living Proof"	2011	—N/a	The Help: Music from the Motion Picture
"Harden My Heart"	2012	Julianne Hough	Rock of Ages
"Shadows of the Night"	2012	—N/a	Rock of Ages
"Here I Go Again"	2012	Diego Boneta, Paul Giamatti, J. Hough, M. Blige, Tom Cruise	Rock of Ages
"Any Way You Want It"	2012	Mary J. Blige, J. Hough, Constantine Maroulis	Rock of Ages
"Every Rose Has Its Thorn"	2012	Julianne Hough, Diego Boneta, Tom Cruise, Mary J. Blige	Rock of Ages
"Don't Stop Believin'"	2012	J. Hough, D. Boneta, T. Cruise, Alec Baldwin, Russell Brand, M. Blige	Rock of Ages
"Rise Up Shepherd and Follow"	2013	Nas	Black Nativity
"Think Like A Man Too"	2014	Mary J. Blige	Think Like A Man Too
"Shake Down"	2015	Terrence Howard	Empire
"Don't Let Me Be Misunderstood"	2015	—N/a	Nina Revisited
"Mirage"	2016	—N/a	Hidden Figures
"Mighty River"	2017	—N/a	Mudbound
"Can't Be Life"	2020	—N/a	Body Cam
"It's All Love"	2020	Justin Timberlake, Anderson .Paak, George Clinton	Trolls World Tour
"Just Sing"	2020	Justin Timberlake, Anderson .Paak, Kenan Thompson, Kelly Clarkson	Trolls World Tour
"Atomic Dog World Tour Remix"	2020	George Clinton, Parliament-Funkadelic, Anderson .Paak	Trolls World Tour
"It's All Love (History of Funk)"	2020	Anderson .Paak, George Clinton	Trolls World Tour
"Just Sing (Trolls World Tour)"	2020	Justin Timberlake, Anna Kendrick, Anderson .Paak, Kelly Clarkson, Kenan Thompson, James Corden, Rachel Bloom, Anthony Ramos, Red Velvet, Icona Pop and Sam Rockwell	Trolls World Tour
"See What You've Done"	2020	—N/a	Belly Of The Beast
"When I Can't Do Better"	2023	—N/a	The Color Purple (2023 film)

== See also ==
- Mary J. Blige videography
