= Mary J. Blige videography =

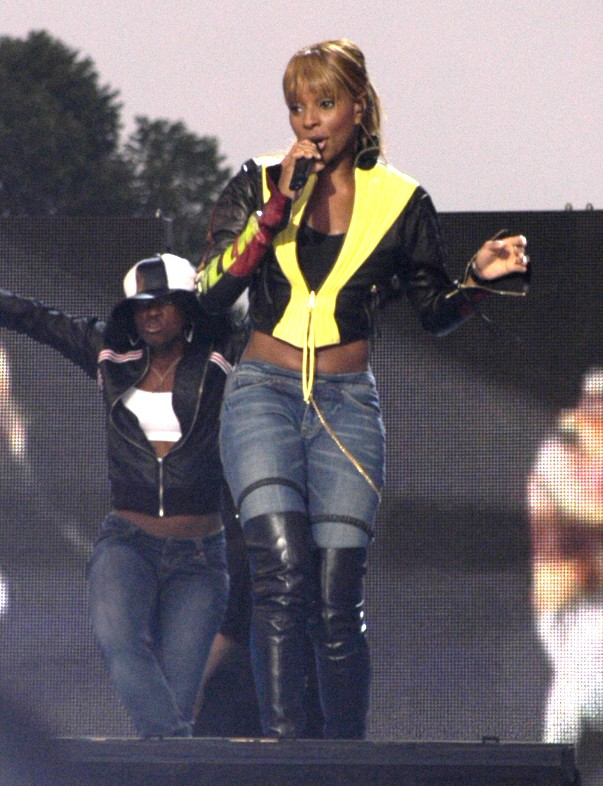
- Blige performing at the National Mall, Washington, D.C., during the NFL Kickoff Live concert (2003)
- Music videos: 77
- Video albums: 5
- Feature films: 14

American singer, songwriter and actress Mary J. Blige has released numerous music videos throughout her career, beginning with the singles from her debut album What's the 411? (1992), including "Real Love", "Reminisce", and "Love No Limit". Her subsequent videos featured songs from across her discography, including "Be Happy", "Not Gon' Cry", "Family Affair", "No More Drama", "Be Without You", "Just Fine", "Mr. Wrong", "Thick of It", and "Good Morning Gorgeous". Her videos have been directed by filmmakers including Hype Williams, F. Gary Gray, Matthew Rolston, and Eif Rivera. She has also appeared in music videos by other artists, including The Notorious B.I.G., Method Man, Kirk Franklin, Common, and Maroon 5. Blige has released several video albums, including Love & Life - The Tour (2003), Live from the House of Blues (2004), and Reflections (A Retrospective) Video Reel (2006).

Blige made her acting debut in the 2001 film Prison Song and has since appeared in films including I Can Do Bad All by Myself (2009), Rock of Ages (2012), Mudbound (2017), Respect (2021), and Rob Peace (2024). Her portrayal of Florence Jackson in Mudbound earned nominations for the Academy Award for Best Supporting Actress and Golden Globe Award for Best Supporting Actress – Motion Picture. Her television acting credits include The Jamie Foxx Show, Empire, How to Get Away with Murder, and Power Book II: Ghost.

Blige has made numerous television appearances as a performer and guest, including on Soul Train, MTV Unplugged, Saturday Night Live, American Idol, The Voice, and Lip Sync Battle. She has also appeared in music and cultural documentaries, including Fade to Black (2004), Beats, Rhymes & Life: The Travels of A Tribe Called Quest (2011), Quincy (2018), Mary J. Blige's My Life (2021), and Thriller 40 (2023).

== Video albums ==
Year	Video album
2003	Love & Life – The Tour
2004	Live from the House of Blues
2004	Live from Los Angeles
2006	BET Presents The Breakthrough
2006	Reflections (A Retrospective) Video Reel

== Music videos ==
=== 1990s ===
Title	Year	Director(s)	Artist(s)
"Real Love"	1992	Marcus Raboy	Mary J. Blige
"Reminisce"	1992	Marcus Raboy	Mary J. Blige
"Love No Limit"	1993	Millicent Shelton, Sean Combs	Mary J. Blige
"You Remind Me (Remix)"	1993	Marcus Raboy	Mary J. Blige feat. Greg Nice
"You Don't Have to Worry"	1993	F. Gary Gray	Mary J. Blige
"You Don't Have to Worry (Remix)"	1993	F. Gary Gray	Mary J. Blige feat. Craig Mack
"Be Happy"	1994	Hype Williams, Sean Combs	Mary J. Blige
"You Bring Me Joy"	1994	Marcus Raboy	Mary J. Blige
"I'm Goin' Down"	1995	Matthew Rolston	Mary J. Blige
"(You Make Me Feel Like) A Natural Woman"	1995	Brett Ratner	Mary J. Blige
"Not Gon' Cry"	1996	Wayne Maser, Elizabeth Bailey	Mary J. Blige
"Love Is All We Need"	1997	Paul Hunter	Mary J. Blige feat. Nas
"I Can Love You"	1997	Kevin Bray	Mary J. Blige feat. Lil' Kim
"Everything"	1997	Hype Williams	Mary J. Blige
"Everything (So So Def Remix)"	1998	Steve Willis	Mary J. Blige feat. Jermaine Dupri & R.O.C.
"Seven Days"	1998	Steve Willis	Mary J. Blige
"As"	1999	Big TV!	Mary J. Blige with George Michael
"All That I Can Say"	1999	Noble Jones	Mary J. Blige
"Deep Inside"	1999	Marcus Raboy	Mary J. Blige

=== 2000s ===
Title	Year	Director(s)	Artist(s)
"Your Child"	2000	Bille Woodruff	Mary J. Blige
"Give Me You"	2000	Earle Sebastian	Mary J. Blige
"Give Me You" (Niño Mix)	2000	Steve Willis	Mary J. Blige
"Family Affair"	2001	Dave Meyers	Mary J. Blige
"Dance for Me"	2001	Urban Ström	Mary J. Blige feat. Common
"No More Drama"	2001	Sanji	Mary J. Blige
"Rainy Dayz"	2001	David Palmer	Mary J. Blige feat. Ja Rule
"Love @ 1st Sight"	2003	Chris Robinson	Mary J. Blige feat. Method Man
"Ooh!"	2003	Sanji	Mary J. Blige feat. Eve
"Whenever I Say Your Name"	2004	Jim Gable	Sting with Mary J. Blige
"It's a Wrap"	2004	Sanaa Hamri	Mary J. Blige
"Be Without You"	2005	Matthew Rolston	Mary J. Blige
"One"	2005	Paul Hunter	Mary J. Blige with U2
"Enough Cryin"	2006	Hype Williams	Mary J. Blige
"Touch It" (Remix)	2006	Benny Boom	Busta Rhymes featuring Mary J. Blige, Rah Digga, Missy Elliott, Lloyd Banks, Papoose & DMX
"Take Me as I Am"	2006	Bille Woodruff	Mary J. Blige
"We Ride (I See the Future)"	2006	Erik White	Mary J. Blige
"Just Fine"	2007	Chris Applebaum	Mary J. Blige
"Stay Down"	2008	Hype Williams	Mary J. Blige
"The One"	2009	Anthony Mandler	Mary J. Blige
"Stronger"	2009	Anthony Mandler	Mary J. Blige
"I Am"	2009	Anthony Mandler	Mary J. Blige

=== 2010s ===
Title	Year	Director(s)	Artist(s)
"Each Tear"	2010	Marcus Raboy	Mary J. Blige
"We Got Hood Love"	2010	Chris Robinson	Mary J. Blige feat. Trey Songz
"Someone to Love Me (Naked)"	2011	Colin Tilley	Mary J. Blige feat. Diddy & Lil Wayne
"25/8"	2011	Diane Martel	Mary J. Blige
"Mr. Wrong"	2011	Diane Martel	Mary J. Blige feat. Drake
"Why"	2012	Colin Tilley	Mary J. Blige feat. Rick Ross
"Don't Mind"	2012	Colin Tilley	Mary J. Blige
"Have Yourself a Merry Little Christmas"	2013	Markus Klinko, Indrani	Mary J. Blige
"My Favorite Things"	2013	Markus Klinko, Indrani	Mary J. Blige
"F for You (Remix)"	2014	Kate Moross	Disclosure feat. Mary J. Blige
"A Night to Remember"	2014	Christopher Sims	Mary J. Blige
"Stay with Me (Remix)"	2014	Andrew Listermann, Danny Lockwood	Sam Smith feat. Mary J. Blige
"Suitcase"	2014	Mike Ho	Mary J. Blige
"Right Now"	2014	Mike Ho	Mary J. Blige
"Therapy"	2014	Sarah McColgan	Mary J. Blige
"Whole Damn Year"	2014	Mike Ho, Alexandre Moors	Mary J. Blige
"Doubt"	2015	Ethan Lader	Mary J. Blige
"World's Gone Crazy (Theme from The View)"	2016	Unknown	Mary J. Blige
"Thick of It"	2016	Dennis Leupold	Mary J. Blige
"Love Yourself"	2017	Taj	Mary J. Blige feat. A$AP Rocky
"Strength of a Woman"	2017	Andrew Sandler	Mary J. Blige feat. Remy Ma and DJ Khaled

=== 2020s ===
Title	Year	Director(s)	Artist(s)
"Good Morning Gorgeous"	2021	Eif Rivera	Mary J. Blige
"Amazing"	2021	Eif Rivera	Mary J. Blige feat. DJ Khaled
"Rent Money"	2022	Eif Rivera	Mary J. Blige feat. Dave East
"Come See About Me"	2022	Eif Rivera	Mary J. Blige feat. Fabolous
"Still Believe in Love"	2023	Eif Rivera	Mary J. Blige feat. Vado
"Gone Forever"	2024	Eif Rivera	Mary J. Blige feat. Remy Ma and DJ Khaled
"Breathing"	2024	Eif Rivera	Mary J. Blige feat. Fabolous
"You Ain't the Only One"	2024	Eif Rivera	Mary J. Blige
"Here I Am"	2024	Eif Rivera	Mary J. Blige

== Music Videos (featuring Mary J. Blige) ==
Year	Title	Album	Director
1991	"I'll Do 4 U" (with Father MC)	Father's Day	-
1992	"Check It Out" (with Grand Puba)	Reel To Reel	Kevin Bray
1995	"I'll Be There for You/You're All I Need to Get By" (with Method Man)	Non-album single	Diane Martel
1995	"One More Chance/Stay With Me" (with The Notorious B.I.G.)	Non-album single	Hype Williams/Sean "Puffy" Combs
1995	"Freedom (Theme From Panther)" (with Various Artists)	Panther: The Original Motion Picture Soundtrack	Antoine Fuqua
1996	"Touch Me Tease Me" (with Case)	Case	Brett Ratner
1998	"Lean on Me" (with Kirk Franklin)	The Nu Nation Project	Mark Gerard
2000	"911" (with Wyclef Jean)	The Ecleftic: 2 Sides II A Book	Marcus Raboy
2002	"Come Close" (with Common)	Electric Circus	Sanaa Hamri/Ahmir "Questlove" Thompson
2004	"I Try" (with Talib Kweli)	The Beautiful Struggle	Steven Murashige
2005	"Tears in Heaven" (with Various Artists)	Tsunami Relief	Marcus Raboy
2006	"Be Easy" (with Young Hot Rod)	Fastlane	Elad Offer
2006	"Runaway Love" (with Ludacris)	Release Therapy	Jessy Terrero
2008	"Something's Gotta Give" (with Big Boi)	Sir Luscious Left Foot: The Son of Chico Dusty	Bryan Barber
2008	"IfULeave" (with Musiq Soulchild)	On My Radio	Sanji
2008	"Just Stand Up" (with Various Artists)	Just Stand Up	Don Mischer
2010	"We Are the World 25 for Haiti" (with Artists for Haiti)	—N/a	Paul Haggis
2016	"Where's the Love?" (with The Black Eyed Peas featuring The World)	—N/a	Michael Jurkovac
2018	"Girls Like You" (with Maroon 5 featuring Cardi B) (Original, Volume 2 and Vertical Video versions)	Red Pill Blues	David Dobkin

== Filmography ==
Year	Title	Role	Notes
2001	Prison Song	Mrs. Butler	Film debut
2009	I Can Do Bad All by Myself	Tanya	
2010	Chico and Rita	(voice)	
2012	Rock of Ages	Justice Charlier	
2013	Betty & Coretta	Dr. Betty Shabazz	TV movie
2013	Black Nativity	Angel	
2014	Champs	Herself	
2015	The Wiz Live!	Evillene	TV movie
2017	Mudbound	Florence Jackson	
2018	Sherlock Gnomes	Irene (voice)	
2020	Trolls World Tour	Queen Essence (voice)	
2020	Body Cam	Renee Lomito-Smith	
2020	The Violent Heart	Nina	
2020	Pink Skies Ahead	Doctor Monroe	
2021	Respect	Dinah Washington	
2024	Rob Peace	Jackie Peace	

== Television ==
Year	Title	Role	Notes
1992	Soul Train	Herself	Episode: "Al Jarreau/Mary J. Blige/Pete Rock & C.L. Smooth"
1992	In Living Color	Herself	Episode: "Men on Cooking"
1992	Out All Night	Herself	Episode: "Smooth Operator"
1992	The Uptown Comedy Club	Herself	Episode: "Episode #1.11"
1992–2001	Showtime at the Apollo	Herself	Recurring Guest
1993	MTV Unplugged	Herself	Episode: "Uptown Unplugged"
1993–2006	Saturday Night Live	Herself	Recurring Guest
1995	New York Undercover	Herself	Guest Cast: Seasons 1-2
1997	All That	Herself	Episode: "Mary J. Blige"
1997–2006	Top of the Pops	Herself	Recurring Guest
1998	The Jamie Foxx Show	Ola Mae	Episode: "Papa Don't Preach"
1999	Moesha	Herself	Episode: "Good Vibrations?"
2000	The Greatest	Herself	Episode: "100 Greatest Rock & Roll Moments on TV"
2001	Behind the Music	Herself	Episode: "Sean 'P. Diddy' Combs"
2001	Journeys in Black	Herself	Episode: "Patti LaBelle"
2001	Access Granted	Herself	Episode: "Mary J. Blige: Family Affair"
2001	Strong Medicine	Simone Fellows	Episode: "History"
2001–2004	Intimate Portrait	Herself	Recurring Guest
2002	The Nick Cannon Show	Herself	Episode: "Nick Takes Over Music"
2005	Soul Deep: The Story of Black Popular Music	Herself	Episode: "From Ghetto to Fabulous"
2005	Access Granted	Herself	Episode: "Lil Kim: Lighters Up"
2006	The Life & Rhymes of...	Herself	Episode: "Mary J. Blige"
2006	Dancing with the Stars	Herself	Episode: "Final Results"
2006–2008	One Life to Live	Herself	Recurring Cast
2006–2012	American Idol	Herself	Recurring Guest
2007	Classic Albums	Herself	Episode: "Jay Z: Reasonable Doubt"
2007	America's Next Top Model	Herself	Episode: "The Girl Who Gets a Mango"
2007	Ghost Whisperer	Jackie Boyd	Episode: "Mean Ghost"
2007	Entourage	Herself	Episode: "Gary's Desk"
2008	Live from Abbey Road	Herself	Episode: "Episode #2.1"
2008	Dancing with the Stars	Herself	Episode: "Round 6: Results"
2008	Imagine	Herself	Episode: "Jay-Z: He Came, He Saw, He Conquered"
2009	Extreme Makeover: Home Edition	Herself	Episode: "Ward Family"
2009	So You Think You Can Dance	Herself	Episode: "Finale: Winner Announced"
2009	30 Rock	Herself	Episode: "Kidney Now!"
2011	The Marriage Ref	Herself	Episode: "Episode #2.4" & "#2.5"
2011–2013	The X Factor USA	Herself	Episode: "Episode #1.22" & "#3.26"
2012	Life After	Herself	Episode: "Andre Harrell"
2012	Tamar & Vince	Herself	Episode: "Meet the Herberts"
2012	Great Performances	Herself	Episode: "Rod Stewart: Merry Christmas, Baby"
2012	The Voice	Herself/Adviser	Recurring Adviser: Season 3
2013	The X Factor UK	Herself	Episode: "Episode #10.12" & "#10.26"
2015	Lip Sync Battle	Herself	Episode: "Terrence Howard vs. Taraji P. Henson, Part 1"
2015	The Voice	Herself/Adviser	Episode: "The Battles Premiere"
2015	Empire	Angie	Episode: "Sins of the Father"
2015	Black-ish	Mirabelle Chalet	Episode: "Pops' Pops' Pops"
2016	Inside the Label	Herself	Episode: "Uptown Records, Part I & II"
2016	How to Get Away with Murder	Ro	Guest Star: Season 3
2019	The Umbrella Academy	Cha-Cha	Main Cast: Season 1
2019	Scream	Sherry Elliot	Recurring Cast: Season 3
2020	Peace of Mind with Taraji	Herself	Episode: "Episode 3, Part 1: Holiday Blues with Mary J. Blige"
2020–2024	Power Book II: Ghost	Monet Stewart Tejada	Main Cast
2021	The Badass Questionnaire	Herself	Episode: "Mary J. Blige"
2021	Celebrity IOU: Joyride	Herself	Episode: "Don't Go Ham"
2022	Earnin' It	Herself	Main Guest
2022	Lost Ollie	Rosy (voice)	Main Cast
2023	The Wine Down with Mary J. Blige	Herself/Host	Main Host

== Documentaries ==
Year	Title	Notes
2001	It's Only Rock and Roll	
2004	Urban Soul: The Making of Modern R&B	
2004	Mary J. Blige: Queen of Hip Hop Soul	
2004	Fade to Black	
2005	All We Are Saying	
2010	Teenage Paparazzo	
2011	Beats, Rhymes & Life: The Travels of A Tribe Called Quest	
2012	Be Inspired: The Life of Heavy D	
2017	Can't Stop, Won't Stop: A Bad Boy Story	
2017	Welcome to My Life	
2017	George Michael Freedom	
2018	Quincy	
2021	Mary J. Blige's My Life	
2023	Thriller 40	
