= The London Sessions Tour =

2015 concert tour by Mary J. Blige

- Tour by Mary J. Blige
- Promotional poster for the tour
- Associated album: The London Sessions
- Start date: June 26, 2015
- End date: November 15, 2015
- No. of shows: 9 in Europe; 13 in North America; 2 in Asia; 24 in total

Mary J. Blige concert chronology
- The Liberation Tour (2012); The London Sessions Tour (2015); King and Queen of Hearts World Tour (2016)

The London Sessions Tour (known as MJB Live! in the United States) is the eighth headlining concert tour by American recording artist, Mary J. Blige. The tour supports Blige's twelfth studio album, The London Sessions. Beginning June 2016, the tour started in Europe playing various music festivals. During the fall of 2015, Blige briefly performed in the United States.

== Opening acts ==
- Tamar Braxton (Augusta, Columbus, Orlando)
- Damon Williams (Jacksonville)
- Keyshia Cole (Tampa)

== Setlist ==
The following setlist was performed June 30, 2015, at the Mitsubishi Electric Halle in Düsseldorf, Germany. It does not represent all concerts for the duration of the tour.

1. "Just Fine"
2. "The One"
3. "You Bring Me Joy"
4. "Love Is All We Need" / "Real Love" / "Be Happy"
5. "Love No Limit"
6. "Enough Cryin"
7. "I Can Love You"
8. "Don't Mind"
9. "Share My World"
10. "Seven Days"
11. "Your Child"
12. "Take Me as I Am"
13. "Good Woman Down"
14. "My Life"
15. "Doubt"
16. "Therapy"
17. "Nobody But You"
18. "My Loving"
19. "F for You"
20. "I'm Goin' Down"
21. "Not Gon' Cry"
22. "No More Drama"
23. "One"

Encore

24. "Be Without You"
25. "Family Affair"

== Tour dates ==
List of concerts, showing date, city, country and venue
Date (2015)	City	Country	Venue
June 26^{[A]}	Pilton	England	Worthy Farm
June 28	Brussels	Belgium	Ancienne Belgique
June 30	Düsseldorf	Germany	Mitsubishi Electric Halle
July 2	Birmingham	England	Barclaycard Arena
July 3	Manchester	England	O_{2} Apollo Manchester
July 4^{[B]}	London	England	Finsbury Park
July 5^{[C]}	New Orleans	U.S.	Mercedes-Benz Superdome
July 7	Frankfurt	Germany	Jahrhunderthalle
July 8^{[D]}	Montreux	Switzerland	Auditorium Stravinski
July 10^{[E]}	Rotterdam	Netherlands	Theater Hal 1
October 16	Marina Bay	Singapore	Grand Theatre
October 17^{[F]}	Kuala Lumpur	Malaysia	MIECC Exhibition Hall
October 30	Augusta	U.S.	James Brown Arena
October 31	Columbus	U.S.	Columbus Civic Center
November 1	Durham	U.S.	Durham Performing Arts Center
November 3	Jackson	U.S.	Mississippi Coliseum
November 4	Memphis	U.S.	Orpheum Theatre
November 6	Jacksonville	U.S.	Jacksonville Veterans Memorial Arena
November 7	Orlando	U.S.	CFE Arena
November 8	Tampa	U.S.	USF Sun Dome
November 10	Florence	U.S.	Florence Civic Center
November 13	Atlantic City	U.S.	Borgata Event Center
November 14	Buffalo	U.S.	Shea's Performing Arts Center
November 15	Ledyard	U.S.	Grand Theater

Festivals and other miscellaneous performances
^{A} Glastonbury Festival
^{B} Wireless Festival
^{C} Essence Music Festival
^{D} Montreux Jazz Festival
^{E} North Sea Jazz Festival
^{F} SoulFest Asia

List of cancelled & rescheduled concerts, showing date, city, country, venue and reason
Date (2015)	City, country	Venue	Reason
October 20	Brisbane, Australia	BCEC Great Hall	Cancelled; part of "SoulFest"
October 24	Sydney, Australia	The Domain Outdoor Stage	Cancelled; part of "SoulFest"
October 25	Melbourne, Australia	Sidney Myer Music Bowl	Cancelled; part of "SoulFest"
October 26	Auckland, New Zealand	Western Springs Stadium	Cancelled; part of "SoulFest"

List of box office data, showing venue, city, country, attendance and revenue
Venue	City, country	Attendance (Tickets sold / available)	Gross revenue
Durham Performing Arts Center	Durham, U.S.	2,697 / 2,712 (99%)	$208,974
Jacksonville Veterans Memorial Arena	Jacksonville, U.S.	3,531 / 6,175 (57%)	$291,373
USF Sun Dome	Tampa, U.S.	3,891 / 6,167 (63%)	$293,329
