= The London Sessions (Mary J. Blige album) =

Studio album by Mary J. Blige
- Released: November 24, 2014
- Recorded: July 2014
- Studios: RAK, London, UK
- Length: 45:34
- Labels: Capitol; Matriarch
- Producers: Rodney "Darkchild" Jerkins; Jimmy Napes; Steve Fitzmaurice; Eg White; Sam Romans; Disclosure; Craze & Hoax; Knox Brown; MJ Cole; Naughty Boy

Mary J. Blige chronology
| Think Like a Man Too (2014) | The London Sessions (2014) | Strength of a Woman (2017) |

Alternate cover

Singles from The London Sessions
- 1. "Therapy" Released: September 23, 2014; 2. "Right Now" Released: October 27, 2014; 3. "Whole Damn Year" Released: December 1, 2014; 4. "Doubt" Released: March 9, 2015

The London Sessions is the twelfth studio album by American R&B singer-songwriter Mary J. Blige. It was released on November 24, 2014, by Capitol Records and Matriarch Records. On October 26, 2014, the album leaked in its entirety to the Internet, with Billboard calling it "superb" and "objectively her best since 2005's The Breakthrough".

== Background ==
In June 2014, Blige released a full-length soundtrack album for the comedy film Think Like a Man Too. The project followed her gold-selling holiday album A Mary Christmas, which became a top ten success in United States, but it underperformed commercially: Think Like a Man Too debuted and peaked at number 30 on the Billboard 200, with 8,688 copies sold in its first week, becoming the lowest sales debut of any of Blige's studio albums. "Suitcase", the only single released from the album, reached the top 30 on Billboard's Adult R&B Songs chart only. In February 2014, amid the production for the soundtrack album, Blige recorded vocals for a remix version of "F for You", a song by British electronic garage-house duo Disclosure. The remix, while retaining most of the original track from their album Settle, was re-recorded for release as a single and became a top ten hit on the UK Dance Chart. Inspired by its response, Blige initially hoped to record an EP with the duo, in July 2014, it was announced Blige would move to London to experiment with a new sound. Blige spent a month in London recording her album in RAK studios with a host of young British acts, including Disclosure, Naughty Boy, Emeli Sandé and Sam Smith. The results were ten new songs, co-written and recorded by the singer in one month in postcodes W6, NW8 and NW5.

During an interview with The Guardian, American executive producer of the album Rodney Jerkins spoke on the musical direction stating, "You have so much different music here. Variety births the next generation. In California the music kind of all feels the same. That 90s house vibe you have right now – it feels fresh. Dancin', celebratin' – feelin' good about life. We're making a Mary Blige record, but she can introduce new styles to the world." In the same interview Blige shared about the project's vision saying, "Our idea was to become part of London... to really embrace the culture – to really live in it. Not that I haven't been here before, but I've never had the chance to really soak in it the way I have this time. To make records from the London-scene perspective. The music is free over here the way it used to be in the States. Artists are just free to do what they love. Listening to the radio you can hear the freedom. The music is living and breathing – you can hear that from Adele's last album. It was massive – a big deal. But she did what she loved." Rodney Jerkins revealed a film crew is making a documentary of Blige's creative process in London with a new documentary, and he plans to drop in audio clips from it between tracks.

== Composition ==
"Right Now" was described by Disclosure member Howard Lawrence as, "start[ing] with some chords I made on Jimmy Napes' piano. We took that and gave it a Disclosure-y feel with some drums that (brother) Guy made. Mary leaves the instrumental side to us and gets much more involved when it comes to writing vocals."

Tom Horan of The Observer spoke on the Naughty Boy produced and Emeli Sandé co-written track "Pick Me Up" stating, "[it] mixes sub-bass with clarinet and a percussion sound that recalls early 00s UK garage". The Sam Smith penned "Therapy" was described as a doo-wop track.

Sam Romans spoke on a song he produced for the album saying, "I'm doing a track at the moment with Naughty Boy – a soul track – and he was saying it's amazing how a Pakistani singer from Watford and a Jewish producer are making something that would be described as black music. That is the interesting thing about England."

== Promotion ==
Mary J. Blige embarked on live performances prior to the release of The London Sessions. On September 23, 2014 Blige performed "Right Now" and "Therapy" on Later... with Jools Holland. It was announced Blige would perform at London's iTunes Festival on September 25 as the main act. During the 70 minute concert, Blige introduced three previously unreleased songs from the album: "Doubt", "Not Loving You" and "When You're Gone". It was announced on October 23, 2014 Blige would be a performer on the American Music Awards singing a rendition of "Therapy" airing live on November 23, 2014. During an episode of Grey's Anatomy on October 23, 2014, a snippet of lead single "Therapy" was played and on November 6, 2014 "Not Loving You" and "Long Hard Look" were also included in scenes of the show. On October 29, 2014 Blige invited critics and media outlets to a private screening of the Sam Wrench directed documentary for the album at New York City's SoHo House. On November 6, 2014 Blige was invited to perform at the White House for 'Salute the Troops' and sang a rendition of "When You're Gone". Blige was a guest on the Ellen DeGeneres Show on November 14, 2014 and performed "Right Now". As a guest on The Tonight Show Starring Jimmy Fallon and the Wendy Williams Show on December 1 and 2 respectively, Blige performed a rendition of "Therapy". On December 2, 2014 Blige celebrated the release of the album at the iHeart Radio Theater in New York City. The event was broadcast on all Urban iHeart radio formats. From the album, Blige performed "Doubt", "Therapy" and "Right Now". As a featured artist in 'A Very GRAMMY Christmas', Blige performed a rendition of "When You're Gone".

=== Singles ===
The first single, "Therapy", was co-written by Sam Smith and borrows from doo-wop with its simple beat, minimal instrumentation, and backing harmonies. The song was made available for download on September 23 via iTunes. On September 22, 2014, Blige debuted second single "Whole Damn Year" on Power 105's The Breakfast Club. The song debuted on the Billboard Hot R&B/Hip-Hop Airplay chart at number 27 and Adult R&B Songs chart as greatest gainer of the week at number 15. The song was scheduled to be released October 21, 2014 as a digital download.

"Right Now" was released as the album's lead single in the United Kingdom on October 27, 2014 and overall third single from the London Sessions. The songs audio was released to Mary J. Blige's YouTube account on September 25, 2014. The Mike Ho directed music video, which premiered on Blige's VEVO account on October 24, 2014. The song was met with positive feedback from numerous online music sites. MTV.com stated, "Mary J. Blige may be a music industry veteran, but lately she’s been in the habit of teaming up with some of the scene’s newest artists—and it’s paying off in a major way. Disclosure also produced the song, so it veers away from the traditional R&B and soul tones that inhabit most of Blige’s work, and the title of the track alone evokes its own of-the-moment feeling. “Right Now” is the most innovative thing we’ve heard from Blige in a while."

"Doubt" was released as the fourth single on February 17, 2015.

== Critical reception ==
Professional ratings
Aggregate scores
| Source | Rating |
|---|---|
| Metacritic | 74/100 |
Review scores
| Source | Rating |
| AllMusic | 4/5 stars |
| Cuepoint (Expert Witness) | A− |
| The Daily Telegraph | 4/5 stars |
| Entertainment Weekly | B+ |
| The Guardian | 3/5 stars |
| NME | 7/10 |
| Pitchfork | 7/10 |
| Rolling Stone | 3.5/5 stars |
| Slant Magazine | 3/5 stars |
| Spin | 7/10 |

Upon release, The London Sessions received positive reviews from music critics. Ally Carnwath from The Observer felt that while "collaborations between US R&B royalty and UK acts have become relatively common [...] it’s hard to think of one as heartfelt and classy as this." He noted that "Blige’s co-writers [...] find striking ways to frame Blige’s voice without distracting from its richness and emotional range." Neil McCormick from The Daily Telegraph described Blige's album "a transatlantic adventure", that "is as much a triumph for Britain as it is for her." He found that "Blige’s presence confers regal honour on a new wave of British talent" with the "impressive results channeling the cool understatement and spacy melodiousness you find in such class Brit acts as Jessie Ware and Katy B." Noting "self-conscious nods towards Amy Winehouse", The Guardian writer Tim Jonze found that "Blige has the vocal charisma to lift up several piano ballads, and when genuine infusions of the current London scene occur it neatly refreshes her sound."

Jamieson Cox, writing for Time magazine, found that The London Sessions is "proof positive that [Blige] is still a creative force with great instincts" and called the album a "thrilling [...] record that somehow straddles the line between a comforting, casual experience and a foray into uncharted, dynamic terrain". He felt that "the album’s most exciting and lingering tracks are the ones where Blige cedes control and morphs into one of the world’s most skilled dance vocalists".

=== Accolades ===
| Publication | Country | Accolade | Year | Rank |
|---|---|---|---|---|
| News.com | Australia | Best Albums in 2014 | 2014 | 8 |
| iTunes | United Kingdom | Best of 2014: R&B Albums | 2014 | 1 |
| ABC News | United States | The Year in Review: The 50 Best Albums of 2014 | 2014 | 10 |
| Billboard | United States | The 10 Best R&B Albums of 2014 | 2014 | 1 |
| Chicago Tribune | United States | Top Albums of 2014 | 2014 | 4 |
| Complex | United States | The Complex Staff Lists their Favorite Songs and Albums of 2014 (Edwin Ortiz) | 2014 | 8 |
| eMusic | United States | The 25 Best R&B Albums of 2014 | 2014 | 11 |
| Fuse | United States | 40 Best Albums of 2014 | 2014 | 23 |
| Houston Chronicle | United States | The Best Albums of 2014 | 2014 | 7 |
| iTunes | United States | Best of 2014: R&B Albums | 2014 | 8 |
| Los Angeles Times | United States | Times Music Critics' Consensus Top 10 List (Mikael Wood/Gerrick Kennedy) | 2014 | 4/6 |
| The New York Times | United States | Ben Ratliff's Top 10 Albums and Songs of 2014 | 2014 | 4 |
| NPR | United States | NPR Music's 50 Favorite Albums of 2014 | 2014 | * |
| Rolling Stone | United States | 20 Best R&B Albums of 2014 | 2014 | 6 |
| Time | United States | Top 7 Most Underrated Pop Albums of 2014 | 2014 | * |
| Vintage Vinyl News | United States | Top 55 Best Albums by a Veteran Artist for 2014 | 2014 | 12 |

== Commercial performance ==
The album debuted at number nine on the Billboard 200 and number one on Top R&B/Hip-Hop Albums, with 55,000 albums sold and 2,000 shifted in album-equivalent units. It became her 13th top ten entry on the Billboard 200 and her tenth number one entry on Top R&B/Hip-Hop albums. In its second week of sales, the album dropped to number 25 on the chart, selling 26,000 copies, bringing the total copies to 81,000 copies. In its third week of sales, the album dropped to number 46 on the chart, selling 22,000 copies, bringing the total copies to 109,000 copies.

== Track listing ==
| No. | Title | Writer(s) | Producer(s) | Length |
|---|---|---|---|---|
| 1. | "Therapy" | Mary J. Blige; Sam Smith; Francis Anthony White | White; Stephen Fitzmaurice; Rodney "Darkchild" Jerkins; Jimmy Napes | 3:23 |
| 2. | "Doubt" | Blige; Sam Romans | Jerkins; Romans | 3:59 |
| 3. | "Not Loving You" | James Napier; Smith | Fitzmaurice; Napes | 3:26 |
| 4. | "When You're Gone" | Blige; Napier; White | Jerkins | 3:24 |
| 5. | "Right Now" | Blige; Smith; Napier; Guy Lawrence; Howard Lawrence | Disclosure | 3:49 |
| 6. | "My Loving" | Blige; Romans; Rodney Jerkins | Jerkins; Marc Kinchen^{[a]} | 4:25 |
| 7. | "Long Hard Look" | Romans; Harry Craze; Hugo Chegwin; Ben Harrison; James Murray; Mustafa Omar | Craze & Hoax | 3:36 |
| 8. | "Whole Damn Year" | Blige; Emeli Sandé; Knox Brown | Brown | 4:11 |
| 9. | "Nobody but You" | Blige; Smith; Napier; M. Coleman | MJ Cole | 4:38 |
| 10. | "Pick Me Up" | Blige; Sandé; Shahid Khan; Shakil Ashraf | Naughty Boy; Shakavelli^{[a]} | 3:07 |
| 11. | "Follow" (with Disclosure) | Blige; Napier; G. Lawrence; H. Lawrence | Disclosure | 4:08 |
| 12. | "Worth My Time" | Blige; Napier | Fitzmaurice; Napes | 3:28 |
| Total length: | | | | 45:34 |

Notes

- ^{^[a]} denotes co-producer

== Charts ==
=== Weekly charts ===
| Chart (2014) | Peak position |
|---|---|
| Australian Albums (ARIA) | 111 |
| Belgian Albums (Ultratop Flanders) | 100 |
| Belgian Albums (Ultratop Wallonia) | 155 |
| Dutch Albums (Album Top 100) | 94 |
| French Albums (SNEP) | 113 |
| Irish Albums (IRMA) | 91 |
| Italian Albums (FIMI) | 67 |
| Scottish Albums (Official Charts) | 58 |
| Swiss Albums (Schweizer Hitparade) | 27 |
| UK Albums (Official Charts) | 40 |
| UK R&B Albums (Official Charts) | 4 |
| US Billboard 200 | 9 |
| US Top R&B/Hip-Hop Albums (Billboard) | 1 |

=== Year-end charts ===
| Chart (2015) | Position |
|---|---|
| US Billboard 200 | 164 |
| US Top R&B/Hip-Hop Albums (Billboard) | 18 |

== Release history ==
Release history and formats for The London Sessions
| Region | Date | Format(s) | Label | Ref |
|---|---|---|---|---|
| United Kingdom | November 21, 2014 | Digital download | Capitol | |
| United Kingdom | November 24, 2014 | CD | Capitol | |
| United States | December 2, 2014 | CD; digital download | Capitol | |
