= Know (song) =

Single by Mary J. Blige
- Released: August 8, 2019
- Length: 3:07
- Label: Republic
- Songwriters: Denisia Andrews; Mary J. Blige; Brittany Coney; Mark Spears
- Producer: Sounwave

Mary J. Blige singles chronology
"Thriving" (2019)	"Know" (2019)	"Always" (2020)

"Know" is a song by American singer Mary J. Blige. It was written by Blige, Mark "Sounwave" Spears, and Denisia “Blue June” Andrews and Brittany “Chi Coney” Coney from songwriting duo Nova Wav, while production was helmed by Spears. The song was released by Republic Records as a standalone single on August 8, 2019; it became her last release with the label. It peaked at number 12 on the US Adult R&B Songs.

== Background ==
"Know" was written by Blige along with Mark "Sounwave" Spears, and Denisia “Blue June” Andrews and Brittany “Chi Coney” Coney from songwriting duo Nova Wav. Production was overseen by Top Dawg's Spears. The song is built around a sample of the song “Reflections” (1973) by Detroit singer Albert Jones which lays the groundwork for the thumping beat and is looped throughout the song. Words by Jones open the song.

== Critical reception ==
Erika Marie from HotNewHipHop found that Blige "has always been an artist to take from her real-life circumstances and turn it into the music of triumph, so the soulful "Know" is just another way that the singer attempts to encourage others by sharing her story of overcoming obstacles." Rap-Up wrote about the song: "The Queen of Hip-Hop Soul returns with her empowering anthem "Know." The soulful song opens with some words of wisdom from the R&B powerhouse, who chronicles her inspiring journey."

== Chart performance ==
Released by Republic Records as a standalone single on August 8, 2019, "Know" debuted at number 44 on the US R&B/Hip-Hop Airplay chart in the week of September 21, 2019. It eventually peaked at number 41 four weeks later. The song also reached number twelve on Billboard's Adult R&B Songs chart.

== Credits and personnel ==
Credits adapted from the liner notes of "Know."

- Denisia Andrews – writer
- Mary J. Blige – writer
- Brittany Coney – writer
- Tony Maserati – mixing
- Mark Spears – producer, writer

== Charts ==
Chart performance for "Know"
Chart (2019)	Peak position
US Adult R&B Songs (Billboard)	12
US R&B/Hip-Hop Airplay (Billboard)	41

== Release history ==
Release history and formats for "Know"
Region	Date	Format(s)	Label	Ref
United States	August 8, 2019	Digital download	Republic Records	
