= Right Now (Mary J. Blige song) =

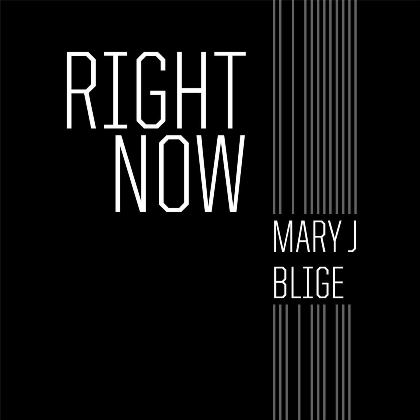

Single by Mary J. Blige

from the album The London Sessions
- Released: October 27, 2014
- Recorded: 2014
- Genre: R&B; UK garage; deep house
- Length: 3:49
- Label: Capitol; Matriarch
- Songwriter(s): Mary J. Blige; Guy Lawrence; Howard Lawrence; James Napier; Sam Smith
- Producer(s): Disclosure

Mary J. Blige singles chronology
| "Therapy" (2014) | "Right Now" (2014) | "Whole Damn Year" (2014) |

Music video
- "Right Now" on YouTube

"Right Now" is a song recorded by American singer Mary J. Blige from her twelfth studio album, The London Sessions (2014). It was written by Blige, Sam Smith, Jimmy Napes, and Disclosure, featuring production from the latter. Musically, "Right Now" is a mid-tempo R&B song, with deep house and UK garage influences. Lyrically, it exudes a displeased woman letting her lover know that she is fed up with his ways, and is planning on making changes. The song was released as the album's second single on October 27, 2014.

"Right Now" peaked at number one on the US Dance Club Songs chart, becoming Blige's fifth song to do so. Numerous remixes and cover versions of the song were made, most notably reworks by Basement Jaxx and Simon Neale. Blige performed the song on several television and award show ceremonies, such as Later... with Jools Holland, The Ellen DeGeneres Show, and BBC Radio 1Xtra.

== Conception and release ==
"Right Now" was written by Blige and English musicians Sam Smith, James Napier, and brothers Guy and Howard Lawrence from electronic music duo Disclosure. Production of the song was helmed by Disclosure, while American record producer Rodney "Darkchild" Jerkins was consulted for vocal production. "Right Now" was recorded at Metropolis Studios and at MusicBox Studios in London. Production of the song was motivated by "F for You", the fourth single from Disclosure's debut studio album, Settle (2013). In late 2013, Blige saw the duo's single their Vevo video site, and got in touch with them about covering the song. The resulting duet, largely composed by Blige, became a top ten hit on the UK Dance Chart. Inspired by its response, Blige initially hoped to record an extended play with the duo, though her label encouraged her to enhance recording overseas and soon it was announced that Blige would move to London to experiment with a new sound with a host of young British acts.

With "Right Now", Howard Lawrence approached Blige with some chords he had made on songwriter James Napier's piano. His brother Guy further helped in the production of the song, adding drums that gave "it a Disclosurey feel". Blige joined production during the vocal writing which resulted in a friendly "dog-fight". While much of "Right Now" was written within two and half hours, the duo spent a lot of time editing and polishing the track. Commenting on the creation process, Howard commented: "That's how Guy and me work. We'll write a whole song very roughly, then go in and proof-read it for a long, long time and change it so much that you wouldn't even recognise it from when you started".

== Composition ==
Musically, the song consists of a shuffling back-beat, throbbing synthesizers, dramatic strings, and a glitchy, uptempo percussion. It merges deep house and UK garage with contemporary R&B, while elements of hip hop music are also present. Many contemporary critics viewed "Right Now" as a clear influence of Disclosure's signature sound. Nick Murray from Rolling Stone magazine found elements of London's "woozy, late-1990s garage music" and American record producer Timbaland's "early-aughts pop bangers" and further went on to describe its production as "a smooth, syncopated retro-sex sound".

== Music video ==
The music video for "Right Now" was directed by Mike Ho. It marked his second collaboration with Blige after their video for "Suitcase". The visuals video feature Blige being chauffeured in a black Bentley while enjoying the night views of the city, intercut with footage of her singing to the camera in a yellow dress. After her arrival at the London nightclub, she takes off her fur coat and throws it on the ground before performing the track in front of an excited crowd.

== Credits and personnel ==
Credits adapted from the liner notes of The London Sessions.

- Production: Disclosure
- Vocal production: Rodney "Darkchild" Jerkins, Disclosure
- Background vocals: Howard Lawrence, James Napier, Sam Smith
- Recording: Trehy Harris, James Napier
- Recording assistance: Alex Robinson, Gus Pirelli
- Mixing: Disclosure

== Charts ==
| Chart (2015) | Peak position |
|---|---|
| CIS Airplay (TopHit) | 191 |
| UK Singles (OCC) | 100 |
| UK Hip Hop/R&B (OCC) | 13 |
| US Dance Club Songs (Billboard) | 1 |

== Release history ==
Release history and formats for "Right Now"
| Region | Date | Format | Label | Ref. |
|---|---|---|---|---|
| United States | November 24, 2014 | Digital download | Capitol | |

== See also ==
- List of number-one dance singles of 2015 (U.S.)
