= Gratitude (Mary J. Blige album) =

Studio album by Mary J. Blige
- Released: November 15, 2024
- Genre: R&B
- Length: 41:20
- Label: 300; Mary Jane
- Producer: Bizness Boi; Aidan Brody; Will Campbell; Darkchild; DJ Cassidy; D'Mile; Doc; Fortune; Kaytranada; Pat Kelly; Kofo; Jack Lawson; Nick San Antonio; S. Dot

Mary J. Blige chronology
Good Morning Gorgeous (2022)	Gratitude (2024)

Singles from Gratitude
- 1. "Breathing" Released: August 15, 2024; 2. "You Ain't the Only One" Released: October 18, 2024

Gratitude is the fifteenth studio album by American singer Mary J. Blige. It was released on November 15, 2024, through 300 Entertainment and her Mary Jane Productions imprint. The album was promoted with the release of two singles: "Breathing" and "You Ain't the Only One", which both topped the US Adult R&B Airplay chart.

== Background and release ==
In 2022, Blige released her fourteenth studio album, Good Morning Gorgeous, through 300 Entertainment and her Mary Jane Productions imprint. The record project received six nominations at the 65th Grammy Awards, including Album of the Year and Best R&B Album, and produced the Adult R&B Songs number-one hit "Good Morning Gorgeous", her biggest-selling single since "Be Without You" (2005).

In April 2023, Blige indicated that her next studio album would likely be the last of her career. In September 2024, the singer announced that the project – her second album under 300 Entertainment and her Mary Jane Productions imprint – would be titled Gratitude and supported by the United States concert tour The For My Fans Tour along with R&B singers Ne-Yo and Mario. Elborating on the theme of the album, she told People magazine: "The overall theme is enjoying life and understanding that, again, life is what inspires me, whether I take the good with the bad. I look at every lesson as a blessing and I understand that I'm not the only one on the earth going through things. I celebrate my triumph, and I work through my hard times. So, the album is going to be fun in that perspective."

== Promotion ==
The first single to be lifted from Gratitude was "Breathing," which contains a sample of "I Put a Spell on You" (1956) by Screamin' Jay Hawkins. Released on August 15, 2024, the song earned largely positive reviews from music critics. The song's album version featuring rapper Fabolous became Blige's ninth number-one hit as well her third consecutive year with a number-one song on Billboard's US Adult R&B Songs chart. Gratitude was also preceded by second single "You Ain't the Only One," released on October 18, 2024. It became the album's second and Blige's tenth number one hit overall on the Adult R&B Songs chart in January 2025.

== Critical reception ==
Professional ratings
Review scores
Source	Rating
Riff Magazine	7.0/10
Stereoboard	3/5 stars
Soul in Stereo	3/5 stars

Renowned for Sound editor Gabriel Barnett found that most songs on Gratitude "resonate with her legacy of promoting self-love through vibrant R&B, yet they still feel fresh and emotionally sincere," but noted that it "stumbles slightly in the middle, venturing into unfashionable territory." He concluded: "Gratitude reminds us that Mary J. Blige still holds her place among the greats. While the slower tracks don't always land, the album is creatively constructed, vocally impressive, and true to her essence. Fans have plenty to celebrate here, and this release is a promising sign of even more to come from the Queen." Al Shipley from Spin remarked: "Blige sings in a lower register now, sounding hoarse at times, but there's still a lot of expressive detail in how she sings a piano ballad like "Here I Am." If Gratitude does turn out to be Blige's swan song, it's fittingly more of a love letter to New York hip-hop than any album she's made in a long time."

Riff magazine's Talia M. Wilson felt that Gratitude "continues Blige's evolution of maturity and independence that Good Morning Gorgeous began. It's not as solid as its predecessor, for its less commercial sound and weaker features. But vocally, Blige has never been stronger, and her creativity has evolved to new levels." Edward Bowser, writing for Soul in Stereo, rated the album three out of five stars. He noted "an unshakable weariness" in Blige's vocals and wrote: "Even more recent projects like Strength of a Woman were a far stronger showcase of a woman who molded an entire genre in her image. True to its name, Gratitude will make you thankful for the little things [...] but it for sure leaves you wanting more." Reid Sperisen from The Daily Bruin wrote: "Despite lagging in the middle and ending on an awkward thematic note, Gratitude mostly succeeds because of its consistently melodic production and Blige's presence as a stupendous vocal storyteller."

== Chart performance ==
In the United Kingdom, Gratitude debuted at number ten on the UK R&B Albums chart and number 36 on the UK Album Downloads chart in the week of November 22, 2024. In the United States, it became Blige's first studio album to miss the Billboard 200 tally.

== Track listing ==
Gratitude track listing
No.	Title	Writer(s)	Producer(s)	Length
1.	"Breathing" (featuring Fabolous)	Mary J. Blige; Jocelyn Donald; Jay Hawkins; John Jackson; Christopher Martin; Jose Leonel Sandoval; Shaun Thomas; Christopher Wallace	S. Dot; Cashmere Brown^{[a]}	3:28
2.	"Need You More" (featuring Jadakiss)	Blige; LaTonya Blige-DaCosta; Terry Ellis; Denzil Foster; Cindy Herron; Rodney Jerkins; Maxine Jones; Thomas McElroy; Jason Phillips; Joshua Pyle; Dawn Robinson	Jack Lawson; Darkchild	4:07
3.	"Beautiful People"	Blige; Louis Celestin; Preston Harris	Kaytranada	3:09
4.	"You Ain't the Only One"	Blige; Bryan Jones; Patrick Kelly; Angelo Velasquez	Aidan Brody; Doc; Pat Kelly; Will Campbell	2:48
5.	"Never Give Up on Me"	Blige; Dernst Emile II; Akil King; Kim Krysiuk; Cassidy Podell	DJ Cassidy; D'Mile	3:17
6.	"Nobody but You"	Blige; David Grant; Jerkins; Astyn Turrentine	D1; Darkchild	3:07
7.	"Here I Am"	Blige; Storm Ford; Thomas	S. Dot	2:53
8.	"Don't Fuck Up"	Blige; Thomas	S. Dot	2:54
9.	"Superpowers"	Blige; Nija Charles; Kevin Ekofo; Jay Gogna; Makeba Riddick-Woods; Thomas; Tre'Von Waters	Bizness Boi; Fortune; Kofo; S. Dot	2:52
10.	"Can't Wait for You"	Blige; Denisia Andrews; Brittany Coney; Gabi Wilson; Jerkins	Darkchild	3:31
11.	"God's Child" (featuring Fat Joe)	Blige; Joseph Cartagena; Erskine Isaac; Bryan Jones; Kelly; Velasquez	Brody; Doc; Nick San Antonio; Kelly; Campbell	4:15

Digital bonus track
No.	Title	Writer(s)	Producer(s)	Length
12.	"I Got Plans" (featuring Ferg)	Blige; Emile; Darold Ferguson Jr.; King; Krysiuk; Podell	DJ Cassidy; D'Mile; Kuk Harrell^{[v]}	4:59
Total length:				41:20

Notes

- ^{^[a]} signifies an additional producer.
- ^{^[v]} signifies a vocal producer.

Sample credits

- "Breathing" contains excerpts and samples from "Kick in the Door" (1997) by American rapper Notorious B.I.G. and "I Put a Spell on You" (1956) by Screamin' Jay Hawkins.
- "Need You More" contains samples from "Hold On" (1990) as performed by En Vogue.
- "Never Give Up On Me" samples "My Love Don't Come Easy" (1979) by Jean Carn.

== Personnel ==
Musicians

- Mary J. Blige – lead vocals (all tracks), background vocals (tracks 2, 6, 10)
- Fabolous – vocals (track 1)
- Frank Bunot – bass (tracks 2, 6)
- Jadakiss – vocals (track 2)
- Jonathan Zighelboim – saxophone (track 4)
- Ryan Edward Easter – trumpet (track 4)
- Astyn Turrentine – background vocals (track 6)
- Zachary Harriott – guitar (track 6)
- Chelton Grey – bass (track 10)
- Homero Gallardo – guitar (track 10)
- Rob Gueringer – guitar (track 10)
- Fat Joe – vocals (track 11)
- Ferg – vocals (track 12)

Technical

- Zach Pereyra – mastering (tracks 1–3, 5–10, 12)
- Eric Castillo – mastering (tracks 4, 11)
- Manny Marroquin – mixing (tracks 1–3, 5–10, 12)
- Kaytranada – mixing (track 3)
- Pat Kelly – mixing (tracks 4, 11), recording (1, 2, 4–10), vocal engineering (1, 4, 11)
- Anna Parks – recording (tracks 2, 6)
- Lauren D'Elia – recording (track 3)
- Roberto "Mr. Earcandy" Vazquez – recording (track 10)
- Kuk Harrell – vocal engineering (track 12)
- Jelli Dorman – vocal engineering (track 12)
- Anthony Vilchis – mixing assistance (tracks 1–3, 5–10, 12)
- Trey Station – mixing assistance (tracks 1–3, 5–10, 12)
- Will Campbell – mixing assistance (tracks 4, 11)
- Emmit "Trill" Walker – string arrangement (track 7)

== Charts ==
Chart performance for Gratitude
Chart (2024)	Peak position
UK Album Downloads (OCC)	36
UK R&B Albums (OCC)	10

== Release history ==
Gratitude release history
Region	Date	Format	Label	Ref(s)
Various	November 15, 2024	CD; digital download; streaming	300; Mary Jane	
