= Thriving (song) =

Single by Mary J. Blige featuring Nas
- Released: May 10, 2019
- Length: 3:42
- Label: Republic
- Songwriters: Denisia Andrews; Mary J. Blige; Darhyl Camper Jr.; Brittany Coney; Nasir Jones
- Producer: DJ Camper

Mary J. Blige singles chronology
"Only Love" (2018)	"Thriving" (2019)	"Know" (2019)

"Thriving" is a song by American singer Mary J. Blige featuring guest vocals from rapper Nas. It was written by Blige, Darhyl "DJ" Camper Jr., Nas and Denisia “Blue June” Andrews and Brittany “Chi Coney” Coney from songwriting duo Nova Wav, while production was helmed by Camper. The song is built around a sample of the song "Under the Influence of Love" (1967) by American girl group Love Unlimited. "Thriving" was released by Republic Records as a digital single on May 10, 2019, to commence with Nas and Blige's The Royalty Tour and peaked at number 21 on the US Adult R&B Songs.

== Background ==
"Thriving" was written by Blige and Nas along with Darhyl "DJ" Camper Jr., and Denisia “Blue June” Andrews and Brittany “Chi Coney” Coney from songwriting duo Nova Wav. Blige performed a solo version of the song first on New York City radio station Power 105.1's The Breakfast Club and shared a snippet on Instagram in March 2019. Along with the cover art, Blige also posted a quote from poet Maya Angelou on her Instagram in April 2019, writing "my mission in life is not merely to survive, but to THRIVE, and do so with some passion, some compassion, some humor, and some style."

== Critical reception ==
Rolling Stone editor Ryan Reed wrote that "with its melismatic vocal hooks, the track showcases Blige’s soulful voice throughout as she reflects on overcoming challenges [...] Nas appears halfway through with a brief verse, name-dropping Muhammad Ali and squashing negative energy." Jon Pareles, writing for The New York Times, called the song "Blige's latest parcel of motivational advice. Her message [...] is delivered atop a tense, urgent, two-bar vamp and a sustained tone that run nearly nonstop through the track, hinting at psychedelic-era Temptations. Even in such tight confines, Blige stokes a gospel-charged conviction."

== Chart performance ==
Released on May 10, 2019, to commence with the kickoff of Nas and Blige's 2019 joint The Royalty Tour, "Thriving" debuted at the US R&B/Hip-Hop Airplay chart in the week ending May 25, 2019. It eventually peaked at number 37 in the week of July 6, 2019. The song also reached number 18 on Billboard's US Adult R&B Songs chart.

== Credits and personnel ==
Credits adapted from the liner notes of "Thriving."

- Denisia Andrews – writer
- Mary J. Blige – vocals, writer
- Darhyl Camper Jr. – producer, writer
- Brittany Coney – writer
- Lauren D'Elia – recording
- Nasir Jones – vocals, writer
- Tony Maserati – mixing

== Charts ==
Chart performance for "Thriving"
Chart (2019)	Peak position
US R&B/Hip-Hop Airplay (Billboard)	37

== Release history ==
Release history and formats for "Thriving"
Region	Date	Format(s)	Label	Ref
United States	May 10, 2019	Digital download; streaming	Republic	
