= Think Like a Man Too (soundtrack) =

Soundtrack album by Mary J. Blige
- Released: June 17, 2014
- Length: 56:37
- Label: Epic
- Producers: Arden "Keyz" Altion; Darhyl "Hey DJ" Camper; Ronald "Flippa" Colson; Jerry Duplessis; Mark J. Feist; Pop & Oak; Rodney Jerkins; Steve "AceFace" Mostyn; Tricky Stewart; The-Dream

Mary J. Blige chronology
A Mary Christmas (2013)	Think Like a Man Too (2014)	The London Sessions (2014)

Singles from Think Like a Man Too
- 1. "Suitcase" Released: June 3, 2014

Think Like a Man Too is the first soundtrack album by American singer Mary J. Blige. It serves as the soundtrack from the romantic comedy film of the same name (2014). The album was released on June 17, 2014, by Epic Records. It features guest appearances from The-Dream and Pharrell Williams, while production was handled by Rodney Jerkins, The-Dream, Tricky Stewart, Williams, Pop & Oak, Jerry Duplessis, Darhyl "Hey DJ" Camper, Mark J. Feist, and Ronald "Flippa" Colson, among others.

The album earned largely mixed reviews from musics critics, who complimented its production value but found that it failed to match the quality of Blige's usual output. Think Like a Man Too debuted at number 30 on the US Billboard 200 chart, with 8,688 copies sold its first week. It also debuted on the Top R&B/Hip-Hop Albums chart at number six, her 16th top ten entry on the chart. The soundtrack's sole single "Suitcase," reached the top 30 on the US Billboard Adult R&B Songs chart.

== Background ==
On May 30, 2014, it was announced that Think Like A Man Too (Music From & Inspired By the Film) would introduce an entire collection of new songs by Mary J. Blige, including the album's first single "Suitcase." The music showcases Blige's signature sound, while her remake of Shalamar's hit "A Night To Remember" was inspired by key scenes in both the film and trailer. Influenced by the backdrop to the film, "Vegas Nights" featuring The-Dream was included as the end credits to the film, while "Moment of Love" showcases the songstress' powerful and passionate vocals.

== Singles ==
"Suitcase" was released for download on June 3, 2014, as the first single from the soundtrack. It was later sent for urban contemporary and urban adult contemporary airplay in the US on June 10, 2014. The song was produced and co-written by Mark J. Feist.

=== Other songs ===
"Moment of Love" and the Shalamar remake,"A Night to Remember", were released as promotional singles on iTunes on June 3, 2014, as part of the album pre-order.

== Critical response ==
Professional ratings
Review scores
Source	Rating
AllMusic	3.5/5 stars
Los Angeles Times	2/4 stars

Think Like a Man Too received generally mixed reviews from music critics. Andy Kellmann of AllMusic gave the album a positive review, calling it "a solid, elegant '70s throwback dashed with Latin, Philly, and Memphis soul touches and an easy groove." He found that "as a soundtrack, it's an enjoyable change of pace". Associated Press writer Melanie J. Sims found that "Blige, the Queen of Hip-Hop Soul, easily proves herself more than capable of exercising a vocal and emotional range to capture all the ups, downs and misfires one might expect from a movie inspired by Steve Harvey's best-selling relationship guide book." She added that "as a whole, the Think Like a Man Too compilation reveals that while women and men might be closer to figuring each other out, we can never outsmart love."

SoulTracks editor J. Matthew Cobb wrote: "To be quite honest, Blige has had better material than what's being offered her on Think Like a Man Too. Some of the material is quite sappy. That's just heartbreaking, but she's having the time of her life here [...] Like Aretha did with Sparkle, she has pulled off an interesting motion picture soundtrack all on her own. And, like the film and the lead actors inside it, Blige is well deserving of the marquee spotlight." Levon Dennison from Renowned for Sound that "while the songs on the record are relatively catchy and well produced, they simply do not match the usual output we are used to from the R&B superstar." Commenting on the album's moderate sales debut, Mikael Wood from the Los Angeles Times wrote that "in a sense, Blige appears to have anticipated such a cool reception: This might be her laziest album ever [...] None of this stuff is great; I'd be shocked if any of it ends up on Blige's next hits disc. But it's kind of a kick to hear this avatar of artistic seriousness – the woman Bono once asked to help remake the grandiose “One” – in such a lightweight mode. If only it hadn't blown away so easily."

== Commercial performance ==
In the United States, Think Like a Man Too debuted at number 30 on the Billboard 200, with 8,688 copies sold in its first week, becoming the lowest sales debut of any of Blige's albums. On Billboard's Top R&B/Hip-Hop Albums chart, the soundtrack album charted at number six, marking Blige's 16th top ten entry on the chart, tying her with Mariah Carey for the second-most top tens by a female artist.

== Track listing ==
Think Like a Man Too track listing
No.	Title	Writer(s)	Producer(s)	Length
1.	"A Night to Remember"	Dana Myers; Charmaine Elaine Sylvers; Nidra Sylvers	Rodney Jerkins	4:14
2.	"Vegas Nights" (featuring The-Dream)	Mary J. Blige; Terius Nash; Christopher Stewart	Stewart; The-Dream; Jerkins	3:05
3.	"Moment of Love"	Nash; Stewart	Nash; Stewart	4:07
4.	"See That Boy Again" (featuring Pharrell Williams)	Williams	Williams	4:13
5.	"Wonderful"	Priscilla Renea Hamilton; Blige; LaShawn Daniels; Ronald "Flippa" Colson; Warren "Oak" Felder; Andrew "Pop" Wansel; Stephen Mostyn; Raysean Hairston; Kamaal Fareed; Ali Shaheed Jones-Muhammad; Grover Washington Jr.	Ronald "Flippa" Colson; Pop & Oak; AceFace	3:31
6.	"Kiss and Make Up"	Hamilton; Blige; Daniels; Ronald "Flippa" Colson; Felder; Wansel; Mostyn; Hairston; Ronnie Laws	Ronald "Flippa" Colson; Oak; Pop; AceFace	3:31
7.	"Cargo"	Nash; Stewart; Blige; Fred Tackett	Stewart; The-Dream	3:02
8.	"Suitcase"	Mark J. Feist; Crystal Nicole; Adrian Sotomayor	Feist	3:48
9.	"I Want You"	Jerry Duplessis; Arden Altino; Jazmine Sullivan	Duplessis; Arden "Keyz" Altino^{[a]}	6:15
10.	"Self Love"	Daryhl Camper; Samuel Dew; Blige	Daryhl "DJ" Camper	3:43
11.	"Power Back"	Nash; Stewart; Blige	Stewart; The-Dream	3:56
12.	"All Fun and Games"	Nash; Stewart	Tricky Stewart; The-Dream	4:45
13.	"Better"	Nash; Stewart	Tricky Stewart; The-Dream	4:06
14.	"Propose"	Nash; Stewart	Stewart; The-Dream	4:21
Total length:				56:37

Notes

- ^{^[a]} signifies a co-producer

Sampling credits

- "A Night to Remember" is a cover of the Shalamar song of the same name.
- "Wonderful" contains a sample from "Push It Along" as performed by A Tribe Called Quest.
- "Kiss and Make Up" contains a sample from "Every Generation" as performed by Ronnie Laws.
- "Cargo" contains a sample from "Fool Yourself" as performed by Little Feat.

== Personnel ==
- Mary J. Blige — Composer, Vocals, Executive Producer
- The-Dream — Featured Artist, Composer, Producer
- Pharrell Williams — Featured Artist, Composer, Producer
- Christopher Stewart — Composer, Producer
- Rodney Jerkins — Producer, Musician
- Mark J. Feist — Composer, Producer
- Jerry Duplessis — Composer, Producer
- Arden Altion — Composer, Producer
- Ronald "Flippa" Colson — Composer, Producer
- Oak — Composer, Producer
- Pop — Composer, Producer
- Ace Face — Composer, Producer
- Darhyl Camper — Composer, Producer
- Bart Schoudel — Vocal Producer, Engineer
- Brian Thomas — Engineer
- Andrew Coleman — Arranger, Engineer
- Mike Larson — Arranger, Engineer
- Nick Valentin — Assistant Engineer
- Ian Mercel — Assistant Engineer
- Jaycen Joshua — Mixing
- Dave Kutch — Mastering

== Charts ==
Chart performance for Think Like a Man Too
Chart (2014)	Peak position
US Billboard 200	30
US Soundtrack Albums (Billboard)	3
US Top R&B/Hip-Hop Albums (Billboard)	6
