= Doubt (Mary J. Blige song) =

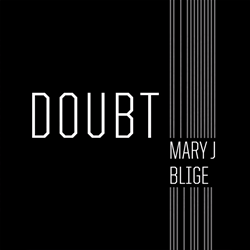

Single by Mary J. Blige

from the album The London Sessions
- Released: March 9, 2015
- Length: 3:48
- Label: Capitol; Matriarch
- Songwriter(s): Mary J. Blige; Sam Romans
- Producer(s): Rodney "Darkchild" Jerkins; Romans

Mary J. Blige singles chronology
"Whole Damn Year" (2014)	"Doubt" (2015)	"Thick of It" (2016)

Music video
- "Doubt" on YouTube

"Doubt" is a song by American singer Mary J. Blige. It was written by Blige and English musician Sam Romans for her twelfth studio album The London Sessions (2014), while production was helmed by Romans along with Rodney "Darkchild" Jerkins. "Doubt" is a R&B ballad, with gospel influences. The song was released as the album's fourth and final single on March 9, 2015, and peaked in the top ten on the US Adult R&B Songs.

== Background ==
"Doubt" was written by Mary J. Blige along with English musician Sam Romans and conceived in the summer of 2014 during which Blige had been staying in London to experiment with a new sound on her twelfth studio album The London Sessions. Production on the track was helmed by Romans along with American producer Rodney "Darkchild" Jerkins. A gospel-influenced ballad about "the trials and tribulations in life," Blige elaborated in an interview with The Fader that "Doubt" was "something that so many people deal with. There’s this voice in their head telling them, "You won't do this, and you won't do that." But they beat the doubt by proving that they're stronger than what the doubt was saying. They can be successful, they can win, and they can be whatever they want to be."

== Critical reception ==
In his review of parent album The London Sessions, PopMatters editor Colin McGuire found the song "was one of only a couple tracks here that seems like it might actually be found on a prior Mary J. release, the contemporary gospel tendencies and pretty backing harmonies making way for her recipe of rhythm." Similarly, Time editor Jamieson Cox noted that the song was not "much of a departure from the music Blige has been making for two decades: confessional, sung with power and depth, and built to cultivate a connection with the listener [...] perhaps, a little more spare, and inclined towards a clean, cool sound rather than oppressive warmth."

Jordan Sargent from Pitchfork described "Doubt" as "a classic Blige self-help anthem" and felt that it was the "only one of [a] quartet of ballads [...] which rises to the level of the album's better, later songs." Renowned for Sound critic Helena Ho called "Doubt" a "very churchy track characterised by old pianos and a recital choir. With the sweeping strings, it's all very elevating and inspiring as she croons, "I can't keep doubting myself now." But despite all this, something still sounds missing; perhaps the song could be performed with more gusto – not just from the singer herself but also from the instrumental. It's the same piano progression the whole way through, and a few empowering crescendos and build ups could go a long way."

== Music video ==
A music video for "Doubt" was directed by Ethan Lader produced by Roger Ubina. Filmed inside the Million Dollar Theatre at Broadway in Downtown Los Angeles, it features Blige taking stage in an empty theater. The visuals premiered online on March 12, 2015.

== Live performances ==
Blige performed the song on The London Sessions Tour and at the Glastonbury Festival. She also performed it with Taylor Swift at The 1989 World Tour along with "Family Affair".

== Credits and personnel ==
Credits adapted from The London Sessions liner notes.

- Jonathan Allen – recording assistance
- Mary J. Blige – vocals, writer
- Matt Champlin – editor, engineer
- Maddox Chhim – mixing assistance
- Isobel Griffiths – assistant contractor
- Simon Hale – conductor
- Trehy Harris – recording
- Rodney "Darkchild" Jerkins – producer
- Jaycen Joshua – mixing
- Ryan Kaul – mixing assistance
- Everton Nelson – leader
- Ben Rhodes – recording assistance
- Sam Romans – backing vocals, instruments, producer, writer
- Lucy Whalley – assistant contractor

== Charts ==
Chart performance for "Doubt"
Chart (2015)	Peak position
US R&B/Hip-Hop Airplay (Billboard)	37
