= Still Believe in Love =

Single by Mary J. Blige featuring Vado
- Released: October 27, 2023
- Length: 4:06
- Label: Beautiful Life
- Songwriters: Tawatha Agee; Mary J. Blige; Jeff Gitelman; James Mtume; Cassidy Podell; Bradley Thomas, Jr.; Eliott Trent; Teyon Winfree
- Producers: Jelli Dorman; Kuk Harrell; Jeff "Gitty" Gitelman; DJ Cassidy

Mary J. Blige singles chronology
"Here with Me" (2022)	"Still Believe in Love" (2023)	"Breathing" (2024)

"Still Believe in Love" is a song by American singer Mary J. Blige. It was written by Blige, Jeff "Gitty" Gitelman, DJ Cassidy, Bradley Thomas, Jr., Eliott Trent, and guest vocalist Vado, while production was helmed by Cassidy and Gitelman along with Kuk Harrell and Jelli Dorman. The song contains a sample from "C.O.D. (I'll Deliver)" (1984) by American R&B group Mtume. Due to the inclusion of the sample, Mtume band members James Mtume and Tawatha Agee are also credited as songwriters.

In September 2023, Blige first performed "Still Believe in Love" for the first time with Vado at the Hip Hop Forever concert. The song was eventually released by Blige's record label Beautiful Life Music as a standalone single on October 27, 2023. In late 2023, it became Blige's eighth chart topper on the Adult R&B Songs chart. In early 2024, the song also peaked at number 12 on the US R&B/Hip-Hop Airplay chart.

== Background ==
"Still Believe in Love" was written by Mary J. Blige along with Jeff "Gitty" Gitelman, DJ Cassidy, Bradley Thomas, Jr., Eliott Trent, and guest vocalist Vado. Production was helmed by Cassidy and Gitelman along with Kuk Harrell and Jelli Dorman. The song contains a sample from "C.O.D. (I'll Deliver)" (1984) by American R&B group Mtume, written by James Mtume and Tawatha Agee, both of whom are also credited as songwriters. Portions of the song while Blige was going through her divorce from Kendu Isaacs in 2016. In an interview with CBS Mornings, Blige spoke about the inspiration behind the song: "I was trying to believe in something other than what I was living in and dealing with, and that's hate, self-hate, you know? I started this journey during that marriage, that sparked the lyrics for "Good Morning Gorgeous," and that’s the love for myself. So I still believe in love. I'm not going to give up on love, I'm not going to give up on romance, I'm not going to give up on myself. I'm not going to do that."

== Critical reception ==
Gabriel Bras Nevares from HotNewHipHop described "Still Believe in Love" as a "classic, Bad Boy-era R&B and hip-hop fusion as its instrumentation. With slick bass playing, bright keys and synth pads, plus some gorgeous vocal harmonies, it's a pretty fitting and effectively breezy throwback cut. Still, don't let that old-school feeling distract you from the modern sheen and crispness of the production." Antwane Folk from Rated R&B commented on the song: "Beaming in energy and pure, optimistic joy, Blige sings about being selective in finding her next companion. Despite a previous failed romance, she remains open to new love, encouraging those who have gone through heartbreak to do the same."

== Chart performance ==
"Still Believe in Love" peaked at number 12 on the US R&B/Hip-Hop Airplay chart in the week January 13, 2024. It also reached the top spot of Billboard's US Adult R&B Songs chart, becoming Blige's seventh number-one hit on the chart. It would remain eight weeks atop the chart.

== Music video ==
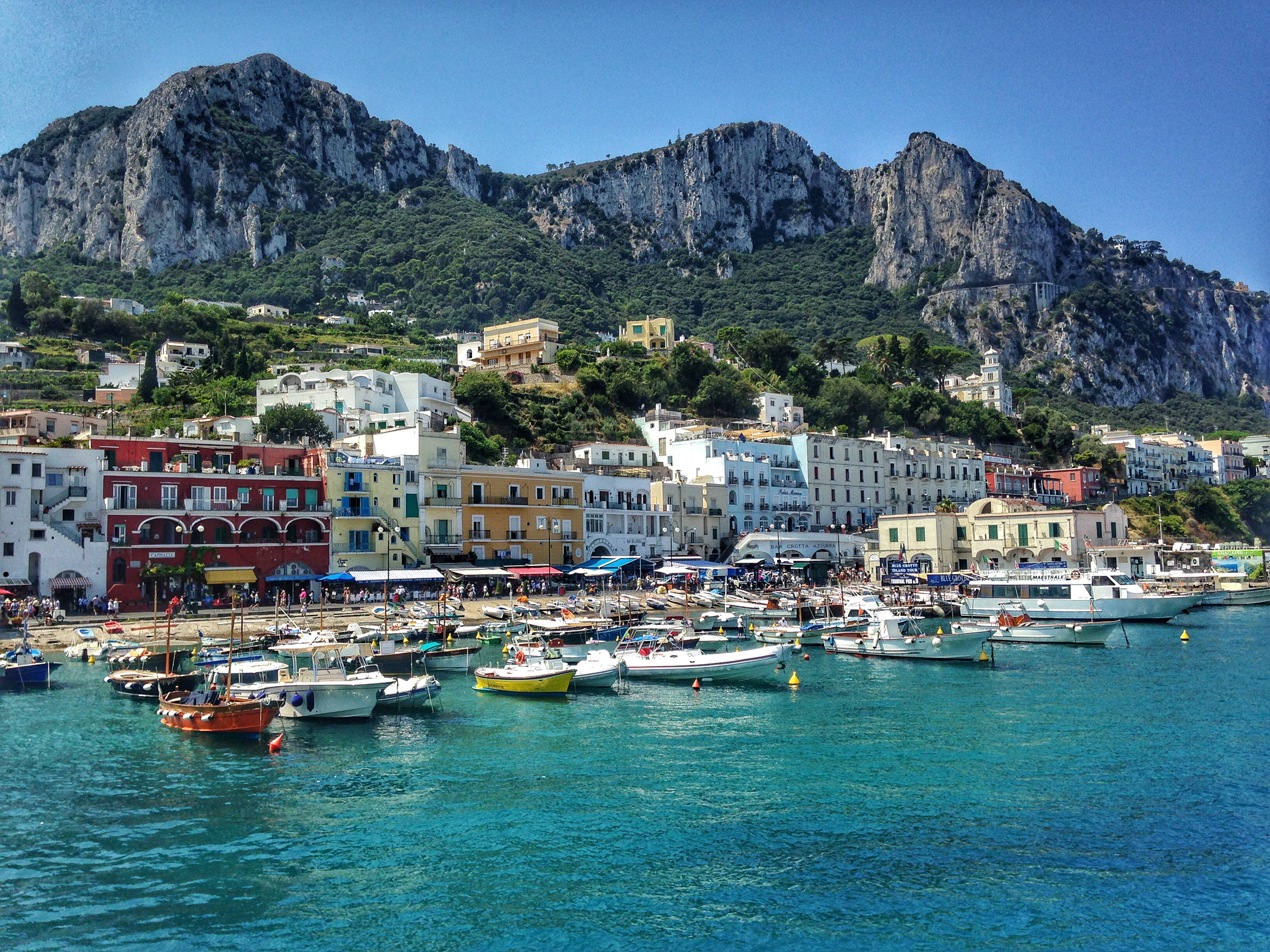
A music video for "Still Believe in Love" was filmed on the shoreline of the Italian island of Capri.

A music video for "Still Believe in Love" was directed by Eif Rivera and filmed during Blige's vacation with friends and family on a yacht in front of the Capri shoreline in summer 2023. Rapper Vado appears alongside Blige in the visuals. It premiered online on October 3, 2023.

== Credits and personnel ==
Credits adapted from the liner notes of "Still Believe in Love."

- Tawatha Agee – writer
- Mary J. Blige – vocals, writer
- Jelli Dorman – producer
- Bradley Thomas, Jr. – writer
- Jeff Gitelman – producer
- Kuk Harrell – producer
- James Mtume – writer
- Cassidy Podell – producer, writer
- Eliott Trent – writer
- Teyon Winfree – writer

== Charts ==
=== Weekly charts ===
Weekly chart performance for "Still Believe in Love"
Chart (2023–24)	Peak position
US R&B/Hip-Hop Airplay (Billboard)	12

=== Year-end charts ===
Year-end chart performance for "Still Believe in Love"
Chart (2024)	Position
US Adult R&B Songs (Billboard)	12

== Release history ==
Release history and formats for "Still Believe in Love"
Region	Date	Format(s)	Label	Ref
Various	October 27, 2023	Digital download	Beautiful Life Music	
