= Breathing (Mary J. Blige song) =

Single by Mary J. Blige featuring Fabolous

from the album Gratitude
- Released: August 15, 2024
- Length: 3:28
- Label: 300; Mary Jane
- Songwriters: Mary J. Blige; Jocelyn Donald; Jay Hawkins; John Jackson; Christopher Martin; Jose Leonel Sandova; Shaun Thomas; Christopher Wallace
- Producer: Shaun "S. Dot" Thomas

Mary J. Blige singles chronology
| "Still Believe in Love" (2024) | "Breathing" (2024) | "You Ain't the Only One" (2024) |

"Breathing" is a song by American singer Mary J. Blige. It was written by Blige, Jocelyn Donald, Jose Leonel Sandova, Shaun "S. Dot" Thomas and guest vocalist Fabolous for Blige's fifteenth studio album, Gratitude (2024), while production was helmed by Thomas, with Cashmere Brown credited as a co-producer. The song was released by Mary Jane Productions Inc. and 300 Entertainment on August 15, 2024, as the album's lead single and became Blige's ninth chart topper on the US Adult R&B Songs chart. It also peaked at number 13 on the US R&B/Hip-Hop Airplay chart.

== Background ==
"Breathing" was written by Mary J. Blige along with Jocelyn "Jozzy" Donald, Jose Leonel "PurpleKBeats" Sandova, Shaun "S. Dot" Thomas and guest vocalist Fabolous for her fifteenth studio album, Gratitude (2024). Production on the song was overseen by Thomas, while Cashmere Brown served as a co-producer. The song samples from the song "Kick in the Door" (1997) by American rapper Notorious B.I.G. which in turn contains a sample of "I Put a Spell on You" (1956) by Screamin' Jay Hawkins. Due to the inclusion of the sample, B.I.G., Hawkins, and DJ Premier are also credited as songwriters. In an interview with People, Blige elaborated on the song: "The story behind the track is what I'm doing finally, which is living, breathing, enjoying my life and celebrating the happiness and freedom I have that life brings. That's why it's called "Breathing." I finally get to exhale and inhale and then exhale and enjoy life, enjoy love."

== Critical reception ==
Vibe editor Mya Abraham declared "Breathing" as "classic Mary with a bit more of a hip-hop feel with Fab kicking the song off," while Sha Be Allah, writing for The Source found that the song "showcases Blige's unparalleled vocals and intimate lyricism. It is a song about what she promised: being happy where she is and reveling in it. Again, Blige proves why she was heralded as the Queen of Hip-Hop Soul." Zachary Horvath from HotNewHipHop called "Breathing" a throwback style single" as well as a "grand and uplifiting [...] classic Mary J Blige record."

== Chart performance ==
Released on August 16, 2024, "Breathing" debuted at number 49 on the US R&B/Hip-Hop Airplay chart in the week ending August 31, 2024. It eventually peaked at number 13 in the week of October 26, 2024. The same week, the song also reached the top spot on Billboard's US Adult R&B Songs chart, becoming Blige's ninth number-one hit as well her third consecutive year with a number-one song on the chart. With nine Adult R&B chart toppers, Blige moved into a tie with singers Maxwell, Tank and Usher for the fourth-most number-one hits only after Alicia Keys, Toni Braxton and Charlie Wilson.

== Music video ==
A music video for "Breathing" was directed by frequent collaborator Eif Rivera. Filming locations included the Legacy Castgle in Pequannock, New Jersey and the East River Greenway on the east side of the island of Manhattan, New York City. The visuals were released through Blige's official YouTube account on August 16, 2024.

== Credits and personnel ==
Credits adapted from the liner notes of "Breathing."

- Mary J. Blige – vocals, writer
- Cashmere Brown – co-producer
- Jocelyn Donald – writer
- Jay Hawkins – writer (sample)
- John Jackson – writer
- Pat Kelly – recording engineer
- Manny Marroquin – mixing engineer
- Christopher Martin – writer (sample)
- Jose Leonel Sandoval – writer
- Shaun "S. Dot" Thomas – producer, writer
- Christopher Wallace – writer (sample)

== Charts ==
=== Weekly charts ===
Weekly chart performance for "Breathing"
| Chart (2024) | Peak position |
|---|---|
| US R&B/Hip-Hop Airplay (Billboard) | 13 |

=== Year-end charts ===
Year-end chart performance for "Breathing"
| Chart (2024) | Position |
|---|---|
| US Adult R&B Songs (Billboard) | 40 |

== Release history ==
Release history and formats for "Breathing"
| Region | Date | Editions(s) | Format(s) | Label | Ref |
|---|---|---|---|---|---|
| Various | August 15, 2024 | Standard | Digital download | 300 Entertainment; Mary Jane | |
| Various | August 16, 2024 | Remix | Digital download | 300 Entertainment; Mary Jane | |
