= A Mary Christmas =

Studio album by Mary J. Blige
- Released: October 15, 2013
- Genre: Christmas
- Length: 45:53
- Label: Matriarch; Interscope; Verve
- Producer: David Foster

Mary J. Blige chronology
My Life II... The Journey Continues (Act 1) (2011)	A Mary Christmas (2013)	Think Like a Man Too (2014)

A Mary Christmas is the eleventh studio album and first Christmas album by American R&B recording artist Mary J. Blige. The labels Matriarch, Interscope, and Verve released the album on October 15, 2013. The album was primarily produced by David Foster, and features guest appearances from Barbra Streisand, Chris Botti, Jessie J, The Clark Sisters, and Marc Anthony.

The album peaked at number ten on the US Billboard 200, becoming her twelfth top-ten entry on the chart. It also peaked at number five on the Top R&B/Hip-Hop Albums chart. It marked Blige's fifteenth top-ten entry on the latter chart, tying her with Snoop Dogg for second-most top ten entries in the Nielsen SoundScan era. Upon its release, A Mary Christmas received generally mixed reviews amongst critics. The album was certified Gold by the Recording Industry Association of America (RIAA) on December 4, 2013, denoting shipments of 500,000 copies.

A deluxe version of the album, expanded with four additional tracks, A Mary Christmas: Anniversary Edition was released in October 2023.

== Background ==
Blige confirmed in June 2013 that she had been working on a Christmas album, also revealing the record would include a "jazzy" duet with Barbra Streisand on "When You Wish Upon a Star".

The album marks the first collaboration between Blige and legendary producer and hit-maker David Foster, chairman of the Verve Music Group. Foster is also the producer of multi-platinum Christmas albums by Michael Bublé, Rod Stewart, Andrea Bocelli, Josh Groban, and Celine Dion. Chris Walden wrote two arrangements for the album.

== Critical reception ==
Professional ratings
Aggregate scores
Source	Rating
Metacritic	49/100
Review scores
Source	Rating
AllMusic	3/5 stars
The Guardian	2/5 stars
The Independent	2/4 stars
Los Angeles Times	2/4 stars
Slant Magazine	2.5/5 stars

A Mary Christmas received generally mixed or average reviews from critics. At Metacritic, which assigns a normalized rating out of 100 to reviews from mainstream publications, the album received an average score of 49, based on five reviews. Andy Kellman of AllMusic rated A Mary Christmas three out of five stars. He felt that the album "won't likely reach the high status of, say, Mariah Carey's Merry Christmas, but it's a full-effort holiday release that many of her fans should be able to enjoy for several years." In his review for Renowned for Sound, Josh Dixon remarked that with A Mary Christmas "Blige has provided listeners with something unique and thoroughly pleasant. This album will undoubtedly remove any notions of stress you may feel about the holidays, and for that reason, along with its stunning instrumentation and impressive vocal range, it deserves to be recognized as a thoughtful and well-crafted holiday album."

Tim Jonze from The Guardian gave the album two stars, saying that it seemed very similar to a formula used by The X Factor contestants of putting out Christmas albums. He applauded Blige's vocals, but specifically criticized her cover of "Rudolph the Red-Nosed Reindeer," calling it "unlistenable." Eric Henderson of Slant Magazine gave the album two and a half out of five stars, criticizing the album for not taking any risks, along with the kid-friendly songs included on the album. Randy Lewis of The Los Angeles Times gave the album two stars, criticizing the album's overproduction, stating the production made the songs very overwhelming. Andy Gill from The Independent felt that "one hardly looks to Mary J Blige for restraint, but here the combination with David Foster's orchestrations adds an extra layer of icing to an already sickly cake. Even when things start out sensitively, as with the twinkling celesta of "My Favourite Things," they inevitably end up in a welter of soupy strings, with Blige seeking to import surplus emotion where none is required. Barbra Streisand, on "When You Wish Upon a Star," is the best of her several duetters."

== Commercial performance ==
A Mary Christmas debuted at number 23 on the US Billboard 200 and at number 5 on the Top R&B/Hip-Hop Albums with first week sales of 12,000 copies. After four weeks of fluctuating on the chart, A Mary Christmas entered the top 20 for the first time in its sixth week, rising from number 22 to number 13 with a 110% sales increase to 31,000 copies. In its seventh week, the album experienced an 82% increase to 57,000 copies sold, despite falling two positions to number 15. In its eight-week, the album rose to number 10 despite a 10% drop to 51,000 copies, giving Blige her 12th top ten album. A Mary Christmas rose less than 1% to 52,000 copies sold in its ninth week, falling one spot to number 11. In its tenth week, A Mary Christmas fell to number 13 with a 25% increase to 64,000 copies sold, the album's best-selling week. In its eleventh week, the album sold approximately 32,000 copies (a decline of 49% from the previous week) and placed at number 21 on the Billboard 200, reflecting the end of the 2013 holiday season. A Mary Christmas was the third best-selling Christmas album of 2013 with 328,000 copies sold for the year.

On December 4, 2013, the album was certified Gold by the RIAA.

== Track listing ==
All songs produced by David Foster.

No.	Title	Writer(s)	Length
1.	"Little Drummer Boy"	Katherine Kennicott Davis; Henry Onorat; Harry Simeone	4:09
2.	"Have Yourself a Merry Little Christmas"	Hugh Martin; Ralph Blane	4:37
3.	"My Favorite Things"	Oscar Hammerstein II; Richard Rodgers	3:51
4.	"This Christmas"	Nadine McKinnor; Donny Pitts	3:18
5.	"The Christmas Song (Chestnuts Roasting on an Open Fire)"	Mel Tormé; Bob Wells	3:53
6.	"Rudolph, the Red-Nosed Reindeer"	Johnny Marks	2:27
7.	"When You Wish Upon a Star" (featuring Barbra Streisand and Chris Botti)	Leigh Harline; Ned Washington	3:42
8.	"Mary, Did You Know"	Buddy Greene; Mark Lowry	3:48
9.	"Do You Hear What I Hear?" (featuring Jessie J)	Noël Regney; Gloria Shayne Baker	4:19
10.	"Petit Papa Noël"	Raymond Vincy; Henri Martinet	3:57
11.	"The First Noel" (featuring The Clark Sisters)	Traditional	4:24
12.	"Noche De Paz (Silent Night)" (featuring Marc Anthony)	Joseph Mohr	3:28
Total length:			45:53

Target bonus tracks
No.	Title	Writer(s)	Length
13.	"Winter Wonderland"	Felix Bernard; Richard B. Smith	2:50
14.	"Silent Night"	Mohr	4:10
Total length:			52:53

2023 anniversary edition
No.	Title	Writer(s)	Length
15.	"O Holy Night"	Traditional	3:56
16.	"Do You Hear What I Hear?" (solo version)	Regney; Baker	4:21
Total length:			61:10

== Charts ==
=== Weekly charts ===
Weekly chart performance for A Mary Christmas
Chart (2013)	Peak position
Dutch Albums (Album Top 100)	96
Irish Albums (IRMA)	62
Japanese Albums (Oricon)	162
Scottish Albums (OCC)	56
Swedish Albums (Sverigetopplistan)	34
UK Albums (OCC)	28
UK R&B Albums (OCC)	2
US Billboard 200	10
US Top R&B/Hip-Hop Albums (Billboard)	2
US Top Holiday Albums (Billboard)	1

=== Year-end charts ===
2013 year-end chart performance for A Mary Christmas
Chart (2013)	Position
US Top R&B/Hip-Hop Albums (Billboard)	90

2014 year-end chart performance for A Mary Christmas
Chart (2014)	Position
US Billboard 200	59
US Top R&B/Hip-Hop Albums (Billboard)	14

== Certifications ==
Certifications for A Mary Christmas
Region	Certification	Certified units/sales
United States (RIAA)	Gold	500,000^{^}
^{^} Shipments figures based on certification alone.

== Release history ==
Release history and formats for A Mary Christmas
Region	Date	Format(s)	Label	Edition(s)	Ref
Various	October 15, 2013	CD; digital download; streaming; vinyl	Matriarch; Verve	Standard edition	
Various	October 6, 2023	CD; digital download; streaming; vinyl	Matriarch; Verve	Anniversary edition	
