= Whole Damn Year =

Single by Mary J. Blige

from the album The London Sessions
- Released: December 1, 2014
- Length: 3:48
- Label: Capitol; Matriarch
- Songwriters: Mary J. Blige; Emeli Sandé; Knox Brown
- Producer: Knox Brown

Mary J. Blige singles chronology
"Right Now" (2014)	"Whole Damn Year" (2014)	"Doubt" (2015)

Music video
- "Whole Damn Year" on YouTube

"Whole Damn Year" is a song by American singer Mary J. Blige. It was written by Blige, Emeli Sandé and Knox Brown for her twelfth studio album The London Sessions (2014), featuring production from the latter. "Whole Damn Year" is a R&B song, with a neo soul influence. The song was released as the album's third single on December 1, 2014.

== Background ==
"Whole Damn Year" was written by Blige along with producer Knox Brown and musician Emeli Sandé. Commenting on its creation, Sandé stated: “I wrote this song and I love this song, but I didn’t think that it was a song for me for some reason [...] And as soon as Mary heard it and connected to it, it really felt like the song had found its natural and true home.”

== Chart performance ==
On September 22, 2014, Blige debuted the song "Whole Damn Year" on Power 105's The Breakfast Club. The song debuted on the US Hot R&B/Hip-Hop Airplay chart at number 27 and US Adult R&B Songs chart as greatest gainer of the week at number 15. The song was eventually released on October 21, 2014 as a digital download.

== Music video ==
The music video for "Whole Damn Year" was directed by Mike Ho and Alexandre Moors and released on December 2, 2014. Shot in black and white, it dramatizes the violence in Blige's words, including scenes of domestic abuse and bullying. In the end, the couples seem to hug and make up.

== Credits and personnel ==
Credits adapted from the liner notes of The London Sessions.

- Mary J. Blige – vocals, writer
- Knox Brown – producer, writer
- Matt Champlin – engineer
- Maddox Chhim – mixing assistance
- Trehy Harris – recording
- Rodney "Darkchild" Jerkins – mixing, vocal producer
- Jaycen Joshua – mixing
- Ryan Kaul – mixing assistance
- Alex Robinson – recording
- Emeli Sandé – writer

== Charts ==
Chart (2014)	Peak position
US Hot R&B/Hip-Hop Songs (Billboard)	39
US R&B/Hip-Hop Airplay (Billboard)	21
