= You Ain't the Only One =

Single by Mary J. Blige

from the album Gratitude
- Released: October 18, 2024
- Studio: Invite Only Studios (New York City, New York)
- Length: 2:48
- Label: 300; Mary Jane
- Songwriters: Mary J. Blige; Pat Kelly; Jezus Rose; Angelo "Doc" Velasquez
- Producers: Aidan Brody; Will Campbell; Kelly; Velasquez

Mary J. Blige singles chronology
"Breathing" (2024)	"You Ain't the Only One" (2024)

"You Ain't the Only One" is a song by American singer Mary J. Blige. It was written by Blige along with Patrick "Pat" Kelly, Jezus Rose, and Angelo "Doc" Velasquez for her fifteenth studio album, Gratitude (2024), while production was overseen by Kelly, Velasquez, Aidan Brody and Will Campbell. The song was released by Mary Jane Productions Inc. and 300 Entertainment on October 18, 2024, as the album's second single and became Blige's tenth chart topper on the US Adult R&B Songs chart. It has also reached number 18 on Billboard's US R&B/Hip-Hop Airplay chart.

== Background ==
"You Ain't the Only One" was written by Mary J. Blige along with Patrick "Pat" Kelly, Jezus Rose, Angelo "Doc" Velasquez for her fifteenth studio album, Gratitude (2024). Production on the song was overseen by Kelly, Velasquez, Aidan Brody and Will Campbell. In an interview with People at the evening of her Rock & Roll Hall of Fame induction ceremony, Blige commented on the song: "I listen to a lot of stories that my fans talk to me about. I've been through a lot, but sometimes you listen to other people's stories, and you say, 'Wow, I'm just complaining' because their stories is worse than yours. Everyone has something that they're dealing with and that they're suffering through. The single is basically saying, 'You're not alone. You're not the only one out here dealing with life. Life is not life-ing for you only'."

== Critical reception ==
Vibe editor Mya Abraham called "You Ain't the Only One" an "uptempo, relatable groove where [Blige] provides reassurance to listeners dealing with life’s ebb and flows," while Essence editor Okla Jones described the song as a "powerful anthem, offering comfort and solidarity through relatable lyrics." Edward Bowser, writing for Soul in Stereo, called it a "one-two punch of empowerment" that reminded him "of something from an 80s sitcom, and that's not a diss – sure, the song's themes are a bit heavy, but the upbeat lyrics provide a lot of hope, and Mary has always danced through her pain." Devin Morton from HotNewHipHop found that "You Ain't the Only One" was "quintessential adult contemporary R&B. Blige sounds at home over the beat, and the beat itself is an upbeat one. Lyrically, the track talks about the ups and downs of life, saying that if you've ever felt down, "you ain't the only one." She reminds listeners to go through life by remembering your goals and what you've already achieved, and to "play the hand you were dealt"."

== Chart performance ==
Released on October 18, 2024, as the second single to precede parent album Gratitude, "You Ain't the Only One" debuted at number 43 on the US R&B/Hip-Hop Airplay chart in the week ending January 18, 2025. It has since peaked at number 18 in the week of October 26, 2024. The same week, the song also reached the top spot on Billboard's US Adult R&B Songs chart, becoming Blige's tenth number-one hit as well her third consecutive number-one single on the chart. With nine Adult R&B chart toppers, "You Ain't the Only One" moved Blige into a tie with singer Charlie Wilson for the third-most number-one hits only after Alicia Keys and Toni Braxton.

== Music video ==
A music video for "You Ain't the Only One" was directed by frequent collaborator Eif Rivera. The visuals were released through Blige's official YouTube account on October 21, 2024.

== Credits and personnel ==
Credits adapted from the liner notes of "Breathing."

- Mary J. Blige – vocals, writer
- Adian Brody – producer
- Will Campbell – mixing assistance, producer
- Eric Castillo – mastering engineer
- Ryan Edward Easter – trumpets
- Patrick "Pat" Kelly – engineer, producer, writer
- Jezus Rose – writer
- Angelo "Doc" Velasquez – producer, writer
- Jonathan Zighelboim – saxophone

== Charts ==
Chart performance for "You Ain't the Only One"
Chart (2024–25)	Peak position
US R&B/Hip-Hop Airplay (Billboard)	18

== Release history ==
Release history and formats for "You Ain't the Only One"
Region	Date	Editions(s)	Format(s)	Label	Ref
Various	October 18, 2024	Standard	Digital download	300 Entertainment; Mary Jane	
