= Therapy (Mary J. Blige song) =

Single by Mary J. Blige

from the album The London Sessions
- Released: September 23, 2014
- Length: 3:26
- Label: Capitol; Matriarch
- Songwriters: Mary J. Blige; Sam Smith; Eg White
- Producers: White; Stephen Fitzmaurice; Rodney "Darkchild" Jerkins; Jimmy Napes

Mary J. Blige singles chronology
"Suitcase" (2014)	"Therapy" (2014)	"Right Now" (2014)

Music video
- "Therapy" on YouTube

"Therapy" is a song recorded by American singer Mary J. Blige from her twelfth studio album, The London Sessions (2014). It was written by Blige, British singer Sam Smith and Eg White. Production was handled by White, Stephen Fitzmaurice, Rodney "Darkchild" Jerkins, and Jimmy Napes. "Therapy" is an uptempo pop song with strong influences from doo-wop and rhythm and blues. The song was released as album's lead single on September 23, 2014 and peaked at number 28 on the US Adult Contemporary chart.

== Conception and release ==
"Therapy" was written by Blige and English musicians Sam Smith and Eg White. The pair was among a host of young British acts commissioned to work with Blige in London following the success of her version of "F for You", a remake of English electronic music duo Disclosure's fourth single from their debut studio album, Settle (2013), and her duet version of Smith's "Stay with Me". Initially composed for Smith's debut album In the Lonely Hour (2014), "Therapy" was already reference-vocaled when the White and Smith played it for Blige. Upon hearing it, Blige felt inspired: "It was like, 'OK. This is it. This is the first moment. This is the one that says I'm doing something different.' Slight lyrical and tonal changes were made to make it fit for her. On the process, Blige later elaborated: "At the end of the day, I pictured myself singing it. I went and sang the song. And it was perfect, 'cause I just felt like the message was universal. Because I think everybody needs a little bit. And it's not, you know, literally sitting in front of a doctor all the time. It could be whatever your therapy is. What works for you."

== Composition ==
Musically, "Therapy" is an uptempo pop song with strong influences from doo-wop and rhythm and blues. Influences of gospel genres were also found in the song. It consists of a spacious beat, handclaps, a Hammond organ and the multitracked humming of co-writer Sam Smith. The instrumentation includes thumping drums, guitars, bass guitars, organs, and a piano. Andy Kellman from Allmusic magazine felt the song was "seemingly inspired more by Anthony Hamilton's Southern gospel-soul", while many other contemporary critics viewed the retro-soul sound of "Therapy" as a relative of and an answer to late English singer Amy Winehouse and her 2006 song "Rehab" on which she talked about her refusal to enter a rehabilitation clinic.

== Music video ==
Blige filmed the music video for "Therapy" with director Sarah McColgan in early-October. It remains unreleased yet.

== Credits and personnel ==
Credits adapted from the liner notes of The London Sessions.

- Production: Stephen Fitzmaurice; Rodney "Darkchild" Jerkins, Jimmy Napes, Eg White
- Vocal production: Rodney "Darkchild" Jerkins
- Background vocals: Sam Smith
- Drums, guitar, organ: Eg White
- Additional guitar: Ben Jones
- Additional drums: Sylvester Earl Harvin
- Additional bass: Jodi Milliner
- Additional piano: Kieran McIntosh
- Recording: Trehy Harris, Stephen Fitzmaurice
- Recording assistance: Alex Robinson, Darren Heelis
- Mixing: Tom Elmhirst, Rodney "Darkchild" Jerkins
- Mixing assistance: Joe Viciano

== Charts ==
Chart performance for "Therapy"
Chart (2015)	Peak position
US Adult Contemporary (Billboard)	28

== Release history ==
Release history and formats for "Therapy "
Region	Date	Format(s)	Label	Ref
United States	September 23, 2014	Digital download	Capitol	
