= Suitcase (Mary J. Blige song) =

Single by Mary J. Blige

from the album Think Like a Man Too (Music from and Inspired by the Film)
- Released: June 10, 2014
- Recorded: 2014
- Genre: R&B
- Length: 3:48
- Label: Epic
- Songwriters: Mark J. Feist; Crystal Nicole; Adrian Sotomayor
- Producer: Mark J. Feist

Mary J. Blige singles chronology
| "F for You" (2014) | "Suitcase" (2014) | "Therapy" (2014) |

Music video
- "Suitcase" on YouTube

"Suitcase" is a song by American recording artist Mary J. Blige. It was co-written by Mark J. Feist, Crystal Nicole, and Adrian Sotomayor, and produced by the former for Blige's soundtrack album Think Like a Man Too (2014), recorded for the comedy film of the same name. Sent as the album's lead and only single for urban contemporary and urban adult contemporary airplay in the US on June 10, 2014, following the release of the buzz track "A Night to Remember", it reached the top 30 on the US Adult R&B Songs chart.

== Background ==
On May 30, 2014, it was announced that Blige had recorded an entire collection of music from and inspired by Tim Story's comedy film Think Like a Man Too, the sequel to Story's 2012 film Think Like a Man based on Steve Harvey's book Act Like a Lady, Think Like a Man. Comprising 14 new recordings, including a remake of Shalamar's hit "A Night to Remember" as well as collaborations with musicians Jerry Duplessis, Rodney Jerkins and Pharrell Williams, Blige primarily worked with frequent contributors Tricky Stewart and The-Dream, who produced the bulk of the album.

While the soundtrack was nearing completion, producer Mark J. Feist was able to submit one of his demo records. After working on different track ideas, Feist traveled to Atlanta, Georgia to work with upcoming singer Crystal Nicole. During that particular visit, the pair penned "Suitcase", which resulted from them "trying to write a bunch of female empowerment records." Written in an hour and a half, Feist further elaborated on the writing process with Nicole: "We just sat there in her basement and she had a pen in her hand and she sung me a hook, a verse and then I jumped up and down, screaming 'That's it, that's it' and then we cut it." Once the demo of "Suitcase" was completed, Epic Records head L.A. Reid became instrumental in getting Blige on it.

== Music video ==
The music video for "Suitcase" was directed by Mike Ho. In the clip, with mascara running down her eyes, a teary-eyed and disheveled Blige sits in an all-white room while being observed by men in lab coats. Her man, played by actor Christian Keyes, stands on the other side of the glass as she reflects on all the heartache he has caused her.

== Charts ==
=== Weekly charts ===
| Chart (2014) | Peak position |
|---|---|
| US Adult R&B Songs (Billboard) | 29 |
