= Dance for Me (album) =

Remix album by Mary J. Blige
- Released: August 13, 2002
- Length: 71:55
- Label: MCA
- Producer: Al B. Rich; Curtis Moore; Rich Pangilinan; Hex Hector; Junior Vasquez; Mac Quayle; Thunderpuss; Albert Castillo

Mary J. Blige chronology
No More Drama (2001)	Dance for Me (2002)	Love & Life (2003)

Dance for Me is a remix album by American recording artist Mary J. Blige. Released in the United States on August 13, 2002 by MCA Records, the album contains remixes from her previously released three albums Share My World (1997), Mary (1999) and No More Drama (2001). Named after Blige's same-titled 2002 single, it includes rare dance remixes, produced by Al B. Rich, Curtis Moore, Hex Hector, Junior Vasquez, and Thunderpuss.

Following its release, the album reached number 36 on the US Top R&B/Hip Hop Albums chart and entered the lower half of the Billboard 200. AllMusic declaring Dance for Me "the best, most innovative remix albums of recent vintage."

== Critical reception ==
Professional ratings
Review scores
Source	Rating
AllMusic	3/5 stars

AllMusic editor John Bush rated the album three out of five stars and called it "the best, most innovative remix albums of recent vintage." Billboard wrote about Dance for Me: "Unbeknownst to many of Ms. Blige's ardent R&B/hip-hop fans, the singer is also hugely popular in house music clubs around the world—where incredibly savvy, uptempo rer her smash singles have taken or all their own. Dance for Me brings together many such moments, focusing on tracks from the artist's Mary, No More Drama, and Share My World albums [...] Now, do what the title demands." Nikolas Markantonatos, writing for The Massachusetts Daily Collegian, found that "Blige and her A-list remixers pump up the bass and tempo and sprinkle enough wizardry into the mix to create one of the best remix albums to come out in a while [...] A lot of Blige’s songs were already great dance numbers, so it was hard to improve on many of them, but Blige, along with her remixers, did one fine job of doing just that on Dance for Me."

== Track listing ==
Dance for Me track listing
No.	Title	Remixer(s)	Length
1.	"No More Drama" (Thunderpuss Remix)	Thunderpuss	9:18
2.	"Family Affair" (Spanish Fly Remix)	Spanish Fly	7:53
3.	"Everything" (Curtis + Moore Remix)	Curtis & Moore	7:06
4.	"Rainy Dayz" (Thunderpuss Remix, featuring Ja Rule)	Thunderpuss	7:57
5.	"He Think I Don't Know" (HQ2 Club Mix)	Hex Hector, Mac Quayle	8:25
6.	"Your Child" (Junior Vasquez Remix)	Junior Vasquez	7:31
7.	"Never Been" (Al B. Rich 2 Step Groove Remix)	Al B. Rich, Albert Castillo, Rich Pangilinan	5:34
8.	"Dance for Me" (G-Club Remix)	Gerald Elms	7:12
9.	"Give Me You" (Extended Nino Radio Mix)	Nino, Hiten Bharadia, Philip Larsen	6:42
10.	"Let No Man Put Asunder"		4:20
Total length:			71:55

Japanese bonus track
No.	Title	Producer(s)	Length
11.	"Love Is All We Need" (Cutfather & Joe Remix)	Cutfather & Joe	4:16

== Charts ==
=== Weekly charts ===
Weekly chart performance for Dance for Me
Chart (2002)	Peak position
US Billboard 200	76
US Top R&B/Hip-Hop Albums (Billboard)	36

=== Year-end charts ===
Year-end chart performance for Dance for Me
Chart (2002)	Position
Canadian R&B Albums (Nielsen SoundScan)	147
