= DJ Riddler =

American DJ and record producer

DJ Riddler/The Riddler
- Also known as: DJ Rich; The Riddler; Rich Pangilinan
- Born: Richie Pangilinan; Chicago, Illinois, U.S.
- Genres: Dance
- Occupations: DJ; producer; remixer
- Years active: 1987–present
- Labels: Tommy Boy; Strictly Hype; MCA; Ultra
- Website: www.djriddler.com

Richie Pangilinan (born in Chicago, Illinois), better known as DJ Riddler or The Riddler, is an American dance DJ, producer, remixer, streamer, music director and radio personality, formerly with Houston's 92.1 Radio Now. Prior to that, he was on the radio with New York City's WKTU 103.5FM, WHTZ 100.3FM, on Portland's KKRZ 100.3FM and KKHH "Hot 95.7 FM" in Houston.

He became the first Asian-American and Filipino-American mixshow DJ to be on commercial radio in New York, Austin, and San Antonio. DJ Riddler was also part of the group Mynt who had several hits including "How Did You Know", "Stay" and "Still Not Sorry". DJ Riddler has released over 19 commercial mix compilations on such record labels as Tommy Boy Records, Strictly Hype Records (SHR), MCA Records and Ultra Records selling over one-million copies. Billboard magazine lists The Riddler as one of the top 10 acts of all time with the most entries on the Dance/Electronic Albums chart.

== Career ==
Pangilinan began his career in Houston, Texas back in 1987, working for a rhythmic top 40 station KNRJ (now KHMX 96.5) under a different DJ name, Rippin' Rich. However, his break into the radio world was when in 1993, joined KRBE 104.1 FM under Tom Poleman and Paul "Cubby" Bryant and became DJ Rich. From there he held radio mixshows with KHFI-Austin and KTFM-San Antonio. In 1995, he left Texas for New York City to work for WHTZ-Z100 and Tommy Boy Records.

While at Tommy Boy Records, Pangilinan was credited for his work on the platinum-selling "Jock Jam Megamix" and Jock Jams compilations. The "Jock Jam Megamix" was one of the first legalized mash-ups to sell over 500,000 copies according to SoundScan in the late 1990s. In addition, he helped Filipino-American dance artist, Jocelyn Enriquez, signed to Tommy Boy Records in 1997. In 2003, Pangilinan was the executive producer for Enriquez' third album All My Life.

Pangilinan has also held positions at Capitol Records, MCA Records and Ultra Records in A&R, marketing, and radio & club promotions.

On New York radio, Pangilinan became the first Asian-American mixshow DJ. DJ Rich started on New York's Top 40 station Z100 every weekend with his Planet Z radio mixshow featuring the current club hits. In 2000, Pangilinan was moved to WKTU 103.5 FM from Z100 and was given the name DJ Riddler. His radio mixshow on WKTU quickly became noticed and won several awards like Best Radio Mixshow DJ at the International Dance Music Awards in Miami, Florida during the Winter Music Conference in 2001 and again in 2003.

In 2003, DJ Riddler joined Sirius Satellite Radio and was given his own show called Riddler Remixed on The Beat 36. On November 12, 2008, Sirius-XM replaced The Beat with BPM and took Riddler Remixed off the air. On August 8, 2009, Sirius-XM brought back The Riddler on BPM on the show Adrenaline.

Pangilinan is also part of the production team Al B. Rich along with Albert Castillo that produced for MYNT and other artists. In 2007, DJ Riddler along with his partner Albert Castillo also produced the song "The Anthem" for Pitbull featuring Lil Jon, which appears on Pitbull's album The Boatlift. Pangilinan was also asked by Disney Films to create a megamix similar to the Jock Jams in 2007 for the film High School Musical.

In July 2008, DJ Riddler returned to Houston on the new KKHH Hot 95.7 FM for the Hot Mix at 5 every week day.

In August 2010, The Riddler was named Best Mixshow DJ 2011 at the Promo Only Summer Sessions/DJ Times Convention in Atlantic City. He also won that title in 2011 and 2013.

In 2011, The Riddler was nominated again for Best Radio Mixshow DJ at the International Dance Music Awards in Miami, Florida during the Winter Music Conference along with Armin Van Buuren, Tiësto, Above and Beyond, Markus Schulz, Dennis Ruyer and Pete Tong. In May 2011, Riddler's show on Sirius-XM was changed to Riddler's Revolution and featured weekly guest DJs including R3hab, Zedd, Nervo and more.

In 2012, The Riddler was nominated again for Best Radio Mixshow DJ and Best Podcast at the International Dance Music Awards in Miami, Florida during the Winter Music Conference. By April 2012, Riddler left Sirius-XM and took his Revolution show to IHeartRadio Club Phusion. He also released another commercial CD compilation called Dance Mix USA: In the Club, Vol. 2 on Phase One. In October 2012, Riddler released his solo EP Enigma on Soltrenz/Strictly Rhythm, which featured the vocals from DreamRoc'a, Dragonfly, Nick Fowler and Jay R.

In January 2013, The Riddler was nominated for the second straight year Best Podcast at the International Dance Music Awards in Miami during the Winter Music Conference. In January 2014, Billboard magazine listed The Riddler as one of the top 10 acts of all time with the most entries on the Dance/Electronic Albums chart.

In 2015, Pangilinan started doing productions under another alias, Sneaker Snob where he remixed such artists like Ariana Grande, Selena Gomez, OneRepublic, the 1975, and others.

In June 2016, he was named Assistant Program Director/Music Director for CBS Radio KKHH Hot 95.7 and Program Director for KKHH HD-2 Energy 95.7 until December 30, 2016 when CBS Radio flipped formats to Adult Classics. In March 2017, he was named Assistant Program Director/Music Director and Afternoon Drive On-Air Personality on Radio One KROI "92.1 Radio Now" in Houston. In August 2018, he added Assistant Program Director/Music Director duties for Top 40 WNOW-FM "Radio Now 100.9" Indianapolis with Urban One. In April 2019, he left KROI.

In March 2019, Riddler won Best Radio Mixshow DJ at the Remix Awards held in Miami, FL during Miami Music Week at the Fontainebleau Hotel.

In January 2020, he released his first solo single, "HOU".

In January 2021, Riddler became Director of Entertainment and Digital Content for Rise Rooftop in Houston, TX, a 13,000 music venue with the largest retractable roof that is not a sports stadium.

== Discography ==
=== Mixed compilations ===
Year	Title	Label
2000	MTV: Grind, Vol. 1	Tommy Boy Records
2000	Planet Dance	Tommy Boy Records
2001	Club Series, Vol. 4	Strictly Hype Records (SHR)
2001	Club Series, Vol. 5	Strictly Hype Records (SHR)
2001	Dance Mix NYC	Tommy Boy Records
2002	Dance Mix NYC, Vol. 2	Tommy Boy Records
2002	Club Nation America. Vol. 2	MCA/Ministry Of Sound
2003	Dance Mix NYC, Vol. 3	Tommy Boy Records
2003	Dance Mix NYC, Vol. 4	Tommy Boy Records
2003	Rewind: Greatest Party Hits	Tommy Boy Records
2004	Dance Mix NYC, Vol. 5	Tommy Boy Records
2005	Ultra.Dance 06	Ultra Records
2005	Ultra.Trance:5	Ultra Records
2006	Club Anthems Vol. 3	Ultra Records
2007	Ultra.Dance 08	Ultra Records
2008	Ultra 2009	Ultra Records
2012	Dance Mix USA: In the Club, Vol. 2	Phase One

=== Also appears on ===
Year	Title	Label
1997	Jock Jams, Volume 3	Tommy Boy Records
2003	Deborah Cox: Remixed	J Records

=== Singles/EPs ===
Year	Title	Label
2010	"Higher" (feat. Craig Smart)	Amerada Music
2012	Enigma (EP)	Soltrenz/Strictly Rhythm
2020	HOU (single)	AL B Rich Music

=== Selected remixography as DJ Riddler ===
- A Great Big World - "Say Something"
- Ally Brooke - "Higher"
- Avenue Beat - "F2020"
- Backstreet Boys - "Straight Through My heart"
- Bella Thorne - "Call It Whatever"
- Britney Spears - "Criminal"
- Celine Dion - "Ashes"
- Celine Dion - "Flying on My Own"
- Charli XCX featuring Rita Ora - "Doing It"
- Cher Lloyd - "I Wish"
- Christina Aguilera - "Beautiful"
- Chris Brown - "Yeah 3X"
- Chromeo - "Jealous"
- Ciara - "Oh"
- Demi Lovato - "Heart Attack"
- Dido - "Don't Leave Home"
- Dido - "White Flag"
- Dillon Francis - "When We Were Young"
- DNCE - "Cake by the Ocean"
- D.R.A.M. - "Broccoli"
- Drake - "Find Your Love"
- Erika Jayne - "One Hot Pleasure"
- Flo-Rida - "Zillionaire"
- Foster The People - "Pumped Up Kicks"
- Frankie J - "More Than Words"
- Frankie J - "Obsession"
- Frankie J - "Don't Wanna Try"
- Hailee Steinfeld - "Love Myself"
- Hot Chelle Rae - "Tonight, Tonight"
- High School Musical - "High School Musical Megamix"
- Idina Menzel - "At This Table"
- Ivy Levan featuring Diplo - "27 Club"
- Janet Jackson - "I Want You"
- Janet Jackson - "R&B Junkie"
- Janet Jackson - "Son of a Gun"
- Jason Derulo - "It Girl"
- Jewel - "Intuition"
- Jess Glynne - "Don't Be So Hard"
- J. Cole - "Power Trip"
- John Holiday - “Love Finds a Way”
- Jordin Sparks - "Battlefield"
- Joss Stone - "You Had Me"
- Julia Michaels - "Issues"
- Kelly Clarkson - "Behind These Hazel Eyes"
- Kelly Clarkson - "Catch My Breath"
- Lil Wayne - "How to Love"
- Lorde - "Greenlight"
- Luther Vandross - "I'd Rather"
- Mariah Carey - "Never Too Far"
- Mariah Carey - "Hero"
- Mariah Carey - "You're Mine"
- Maroon 5 - "This Summer"
- Max featuring Gnash - "Lights Down Low"
- Melanie C - "Never Be the Same"
- Mike Posner - "Please Don't Go"
- MYNT feat. Kim Sozzi - "How Did You Know"
- MYNT - "Still Not Sorry"
- Nelly - "Just a Dream"
- Paramore - "I'm into You"
- Paramore - "Ain't It Fun"
- Pink - "Feel Good Time"
- Pink - "Just Like a Pill"
- Pink - "Please Don't Leave Me"
- Pink - "Raise Your Glass"
- Pink - "Perfect"
- Pitbull - "The Anthem"
- Pitbull - "Rain Over Me"
- Pitbull - "Feel This Moment"
- Pitbull - "Timber"
- Rita Ora - "R.I.P."
- Ricky Martin - "Adios"
- Ricky Martin - "Mr. Put It Down"
- Robin Schulz - "Shed a Light"
- Sara Bareilles - "King of Anything"
- Selena Gomez - "Lose You to Love Me"
- Shontelle - "Impossible"
- Steve Angello - "Wasted Love"
- The Script - "Breakeven"
- The Script - "For the First Time"
- The Script - "Nothing"
- Train - "Play That Song"
- Various Artists - "Jock Jam Megamix"
- Wayne Wonder - "No Letting Go"
- Zac Brown Band - "Someone I Used to Know"
- Zendaya - "Replay"
- ZZ Ward - "Last Love Song"

=== Selected remixography as Sneaker Snob ===
- Ariana Grande - "Into You"
- Ariana Grande featuring The Weeknd - "Love Me Harder"
- Ellie Goulding - "Still Falling for You"
- Flume - "Never Be Like You"
- Kid Ink featuring Usher- "Body Language"
- John Legend - "Love Me Now"
- OneRepublic - "Kids"
- OneRepublic - "Wherever I Go"
- Martin Garrix featuring Bebe Rexha - "In the Name of Love"
- Selena Gomez - "Kill Em with Kindness"
- Tinashe - "2 On"
- The 1975 - "The Sound"
