= List of awards and nominations received by Yolanda Adams =

Yolanda Adams
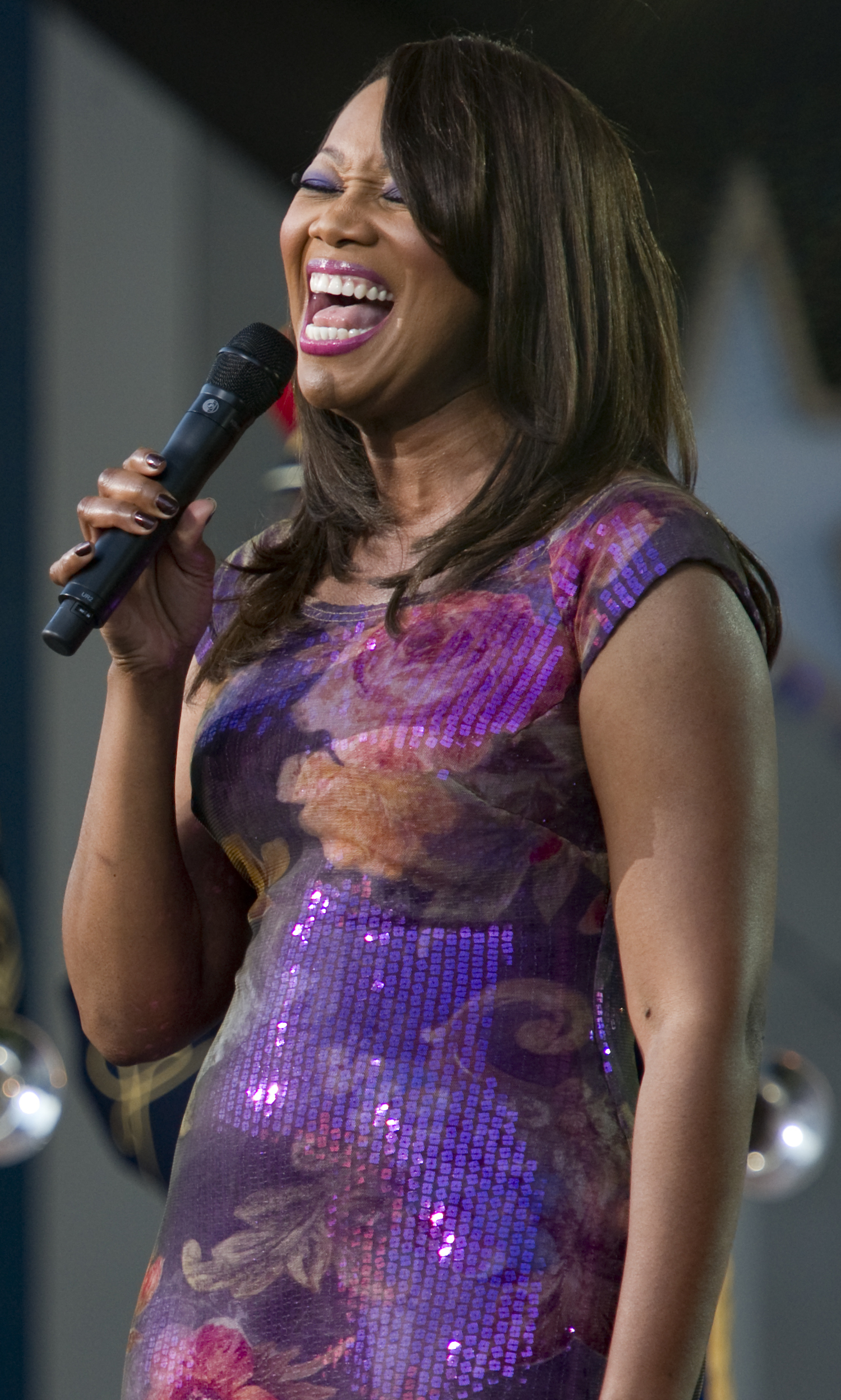
- Adams singing the national anthem at the 2010 National Memorial Day Concert

Background information
- Also known as: Queen of Contemporary Gospel Music, First Lady of Modern Gospel
- Born: Yolanda Yvette Adams; August 27, 1961 (age 65); Houston, Texas, U.S.
- Genres: Gospel, R&B, soul
- Occupations: Singer; radio host; actress
- Years active: 1982–present
- Labels: Sound of Gospel; Tribute/Benson; Verity; Elektra; Atlantic; Columbia; N-House
- Website: yolandaadamslive.com

Yolanda Adams (born August 27, 1961) is an American gospel singer, actress, and host of her own nationally syndicated morning gospel show. She is one of the best-selling gospel artists of all time, having sold nearly 10 million albums worldwide. In addition to achieving multi-platinum status, she has won four Grammy Awards, four Dove Awards, five BET Awards, six NAACP Image Awards, six Soul Train Music Awards, two BMI Awards and sixteen Stellar Awards. She was the first Gospel artist to be awarded an American Music Award.

She is known as the "Queen of Contemporary Gospel Music", the "First Lady of Modern Gospel", while Variety dubbed her the "Reigning Queen of Urban Gospel".

Adams was named by Billboard, in 2009, as the No. 1 gospel artist of the decade, driven by the sales of her No. 1 album Mountain High...Valley Low. In 2016, President Barack Obama awarded her the Presidential Lifetime Achievement Award for her volunteer service. She was inducted into the Gospel Music Hall of Fame by the Gospel Music Association in 2017. In 2018, she became the first gospel artist nominated for a Tony Award for her work on SpongeBob SquarePants. In 2019, she received the Soul Train Music Awards Lady of Soul Award, and received critical acclaim for officially opening Super Bowl LIV with her performance of "America the Beautiful". Billboard listed her as one of the Top Gospel Artist of the 2010s. She has scored five number one albums on Billboard's Top Gospel Album. Adams was inducted into the Black Music & Entertainment Walk of Fame in 2022.

== Awards and nominations ==
=== American Music Awards ===
Year	Award	Nominated work	Result
2002	Favorite Artist – Contemporary Inspirational	Herself	Won

=== BET Awards ===
Year	Award	Nominated work	Result
2001	Best Gospel Artist	Herself	Nominated
2002	Best Gospel Artist	Herself	Won
2003	Best Gospel Artist	Herself	Won
2004	Best Gospel Artist	Herself	Won
2006	Best Gospel Artist	Herself	Won
2012	Best Gospel Artist	Herself	Won
2023	Dr. Bobby Jones Best Gospel/Inspirational Award	"One Moment from Glory"	Nominated
2025	Dr. Bobby Jones Best Gospel/Inspirational Award	"Church Doors"	Nominated

=== GMA Dove Awards ===
Year	Award	Nominated work	Result
1992	Traditional Gospel Recorded Song of the Year	"Through the Storm"	Won
1999	Song of the Year	"Is Your All On The Altar?"	Won
2002	Urban Recorded Song of the Year	"I Believe I Can Fly"	Nominated
2002	Traditional Gospel Album of the Year	Doug and Melvin Williams Duets	Nominated
2002	Contemporary Gospel Album of the Year	The Experience	Nominated
2003	Traditional Gospel Recorded Song of the Year	"Thank You"	Nominated
2003	Urban Album of the Year	Believe	Nominated
2005	Special Event Album of the Year	The Passion of the Christ: Songs	Won
2006	Contemporary Gospel Recorded Song of the Year	"Be Blessed"	Nominated
2006	Urban Album of the Year	Day by Day	Nominated
2007	Contemporary Gospel Recorded Song of the Year	"This Too Shall Pass"	Nominated
2012	Contemporary Gospel Album of the Year	Becoming	Nominated
2015	Traditional Gospel Song of the Year	"How Awesome Is Our God"	Won
2017	Gospel Music Hall of Fame	Herself	Inducted
2025	Contemporary Gospel Album of the Year	Sunny Days	Nominated
2025	Contemporary Gospel Recorded Song of the Year	"Church Doors"	Nominated

=== Grammy Awards ===
Year	Award	Nominated work	Result
1995	Best Contemporary Soul Gospel Album	Save The World	Nominated
1996	Best Contemporary Soul Gospel Album	More Than A Melody	Nominated
1997	Best Contemporary Soul Gospel Album	Shakin' The House...Live In L.A.	Nominated
1997	Best Contemporary Soul Gospel Album	Live In Washington	Nominated
1999	Best Contemporary Soul Gospel Album	Songs From The Heart	Nominated
2000	Best Contemporary Soul Gospel Album	Mountain High...Valley Low	Won
2002	Best Contemporary Soul Gospel Album	The Experience	Won
2006	Best Contemporary Soul Gospel Album	Day By Day	Nominated
2006	Best Gospel Song	"Be Blessed"	Won
2006	Best Gospel Performance	"Be Blessed"	Nominated
2007	Best Gospel Performance	"Victory"	Won
2007	Best R&B Performance By A Duo Or Group With Vocals	"Everyday (Family Reunion)"	Nominated
2016	Best Gospel Performance/Song	"How Awesome Is Our God [Live]"	Nominated
2020	Best Gospel Performance/Song	"Talkin' 'Bout Jesus"	Nominated
2025	Best Gospel Performance/Song	"Church Doors"	Nominated
2026	Best Gospel Album	Sunny Days	Nominated

=== NAACP Image Awards ===
Year	Award	Nominated work	Result
2006	Outstanding Gospel Artist (Traditional or Contemporary)	Day by Day	Won
2007	Outstanding Gospel Artist (Traditional or Contemporary)	Herself	Nominated
2012	Outstanding Gospel Artist (Traditional or Contemporary)	Becoming	Nominated
2025	Outstanding Gospel/Christian Album	Sunny Days	Nominated
2025	Outstanding Gospel/Christian Album	"Church Doors"	Nominated

=== Soul Train Awards ===
Year	Award	Nominated work	Result
Soul Train Awards
1996	Best Gospel Album	More Than A Melody	Nominated
2001	Best R&B/Soul Single – Female	"Open My Heart"	Won
2002	Best Gospel Album	The Experience	Nominated
2019	Lady of Soul Award	Herself	Honored
Soul Train Lady of Soul Awards
1996	Best Gospel Album	More Than A Melody	Won
2000	Best Gospel Album	Mountain High... Valley Low	Won
2000	R&B/Soul Album of the Year – Solo	Mountain High... Valley Low	Nominated
2001	R&B/Soul or Rap Song of the Year	"Open My Heart"	Won
2002	Best Gospel Album	Believe	Nominated

=== Stellar Awards ===
Year	Category	Work	Result
1996	Contemporary Female Artist of the Year	Herself	Won
1997	Contemporary Female Artist of the Year	Shakin' The House: Live In LA	Won
1997	Music Video of the Year	Shakin' The House: Live In LA	Won
2000	Female Vocalist of the Year	Songs From the Heart	Nominated
2000	Traditional Female Vocalist of the Year	Songs From the Heart	Nominated
2001	Artist of the Year	Mountain High... Valley Low	Won
2001	CD of the Year	Mountain High... Valley Low	Won
2001	Contemporary Female Vocalist of the Year	Mountain High... Valley Low	Won
2001	Female Vocalist of the Year	Mountain High... Valley Low	Won
2001	Contemporary CD of the Year	Mountain High... Valley Low	Nominated
2001	Music Video of the Year	"Open My Heart"	Won
2001	Song of the Year	"Open My Heart"	Nominated
2002	Contemporary Female Vocalist of the Year	The Experience	Won
2002	Female Vocalist of the Year	The Experience	Won
2002	Artist of the Year	The Experience	Nominated
2002	CD of the Year	The Experience	Nominated
2002	Contemporary CD of the Year	The Experience	Nominated
2002	Producer of the Year	The Experience	Nominated
2003	Contemporary Female Vocalist of the Year	Believe	Won
2003	Urban/Inspirational Performance of the Year	Believe	Won
2003	Artist of the Year	Believe	Nominated
2003	CD of the Year	Believe	Nominated
2003	Female Vocalist of the Year	Believe	Nominated
2003	Music Video of the Year	"Never Give Up"	Nominated
2004	Music Video of the Year	"The Prayer" (with Donnie McClurkin)	Nominated
2007	Contemporary Female Vocalist of the Year	Day by Day	Nominated
2008	Special Event CD of the Year	Yolanda Adams, The Best of Me	Nominated
2009	Special Event CD of the Year	What A Wonderful Time	Nominated
2012	Contemporary Female Vocalist of the Year	Becoming	Nominated
2012	Female Vocalist of the Year	Becoming	Nominated

=== Tony Awards ===
Year	Award	Nominated work	Result
2018	Best Original Score (Music and/or Lyrics) Written for the Theatre	SpongeBob SquarePants	Nominated

=== Miscellaneous honors ===
Year	Organization	Award	Nominated work	Result
2022	Black Music & Entertainment Walk of Fame		Herself	Inducted
2025	Missouri Gospel Music Hall of Fame		Herself	Inducted
