= Al B. Rich =

US musical group

- Origin: United States
- Genres: Electronica; House
- Years active: 2000-present
- Labels: Ultra Records
- Spinoffs: MYNT
- Members: Albert Castillo; Rich "DJ Riddler" Pangilinan

Al B. Rich is the remix and production team of American record producers Albert Castillo and Rich "DJ Riddler" Pangilinan. Castillo, a musician who holds a Latin Grammy, also was a member of the production team, Cibola, in the late 1990s. Pangilinan, a musician had also worked for years as a DJ and producer and is credited for his work on the gold record status "Jock Jam Megamix" on Tommy Boy Records.

They met in the late 1990s, while Castillo was producing for the production team called Cibola and remained friends. It was not until 2000, that the two decided to work together as a production team. Their first remix project was for a girl group called Eden's Crush created on the American TV show Popstars. They remixed both "Love This Way" and "Get Over Yourself" AL B. Rich then started remixing several projects including Janet Jackson, Mariah Carey, and several others.

Rich's 2002 compilation album, Club Nation America, Vol. 2, received a three-star rating from AllMusic, whose reviewer, Alex Henderson, noted, "One of the stronger club/dance-pop compilations of 2002, Club Nation America, Vol. 2 is enthusiastically recommended to club-hounds who hold rhythm and melody in equally high regard."

In 2004, AL B. Rich started their own group called "MYNT" on Ultra Records. They transformed a cover of Kurtis Mantronik's "How Did You Know" into a number three smash hit single on the Billboard Hot Dance Airplay chart that stayed on the charts for months. The song achieved some crossover success on the Billboard Hot 100 chart peaking at #97. It was later followed by "Stay" (an original composition), which went top 5 on the Hot Dance Airplay chart in 2005. Both tracks were credited as "MYNT Featuring Kim Sozzi". In October 2005, they released their first full-length CD (Still Not Sorry) and their third single "Still Not Sorry", with Angelique-Solorzano on vocals.

In 2007, Al B. Rich produced a record called "The Anthem" for Pitbull feat. Lil Jon, which sampled the song "Calabria" by Enur. "The Anthem" is on Pitbull's full-length The Boatlift.

Castillo is a Mexican-American who is currently married. Pangilinan is a married Filipino-American.

== Discography ==
=== Mixed compilations ===
- 2002: Ministry of Sound: Club Nation America, Vol. 2

=== Remixography ===
- Amber - "Anyways"
- Amber - "Just Like That"
- Amuka - "Craving"
- Amuka - "Appreciate Me"
- Angelo Venuto feat. Reina - "Vivo Por Lei"
- Anna Vissi - "Call Me"
- Christina Aguilera - "Beautiful"
- Ciara - "Oh"
- Dax Riders - "Real Fonky Time"
- Deborah Cox - "Remixed"
- Dido - "Don't Leave Home"
- Dido - "White Flag"
- DJ Encore - "I See Right Through to You"
- DJ Encore - "Walking in the Sky"
- Eden's Crush - "Get Over Yourself"
- Eden's Crush - "Love This Way"
- Frankie J - "More Than Words"
- Frankie J - "Obsession"
- Frankie J - "Don't Wanna Try"
- Frou Frou - "Breathe In"
- India - "Seduce Me Now"
- Jamie-Lynn Sigler - "Cry Baby"
- Janet Jackson - "I Want You"
- Janet Jackson - "R&B Junkie"
- Janet Jackson - "Son of a Gun"
- Jewel - "Intuition"
- Jocelyn Enriquez - "All My Life"
- Jocelyn Enriquez - "Make Me An Angel"
- Jocelyn Enriquez - "No Way No How"
- Joss Stone - "You Had Me"
- Kelly Clarkson - "Behind These Hazel Eyes"
- Kristine W. - "Wonder of it All"
- Luther Vandross - "I'd Rather"
- Mariah Carey - "Never Too Far"
- Mariah Carey - "Hero"
- Melanie C - "Never Be The Same"
- Michael Meth - "I Will Take You There"
- MYNT feat. Kim Sozzi - "How Did You Know"
- MYNT - "Still Not Sorry"
- Nivea - "Don't Mess With My Man"
- Pink - "Feel Good Time"
- Pink - "Just Like a Pill"
- Pitbull - "The Anthem"
- Suzanne Smith - "Closer"
- Tina Ann - "Need To Say Goodbye"
- Various Artists - "Jock Jam Megamix"
- Wayne Wonder - "No Letting Go"
