= 1995 Soul Train Lady of Soul Awards =

American awards show

Soul Train Lady of Soul Awards
- Date: August 6, 1995
- Location: Santa Monica Civic Auditorium, Santa Monica, California
- Country: United States
- Hosted by: Tyra Banks, Brian McKnight, Gladys Knight

Highlights
- Most awards: Brandy (4)

The 1995 Soul Train Lady of Soul Awards were held on August 6, 1995 at the Santa Monica Civic Auditorium in Santa Monica, California. The program was hosted by Tyra Banks, Brian McKnight, and Gladys Knight.

== Special awards ==
=== Aretha Franklin Award for Entertainer of the Year ===
- Salt-N-Pepa

=== Lena Horne Award for Outstanding Career Achievement ===
- Debbie Allen

== Winners and nominees ==
Winners are in bold text.

=== Best R&B/Soul Single – Solo ===
- **Brandy – "I Wanna Be Down"**
  - Anita Baker – "I Apologize"
  - Mary J. Blige – "I'm Going Down"
  - Toni Braxton – "How Many Ways"

=== Best R&B/Soul Single – Group, Band or Duo ===
- **TLC – "Creep"**
  - BlackGirl – "Let's Do It Again"
  - Brownstone – "If You Love Me"
  - Total – "Can't You See"

=== R&B/Soul Album of the Year – Solo ===
- **Brandy – Brandy**
  - Anita Baker – Rhythm of Love
  - Mary J. Blige – My Life
  - Da Brat – Funkdafied

=== R&B/Soul Album of the Year – Group, Band or Duo ===
- **TLC – CrazySexyCool**
  - BlackGirl – Treat U Right
  - Brownstone – From the Bottom Up
  - Changing Faces – Changing Faces

=== Best R&B/Soul or Rap New Artist ===
- **Brandy – "I Wanna Be Down"**
  - Aaliyah – "Back & Forth"
  - Brownstone – "If You Love Me"
  - Da Brat – "Give It 2 You"

=== Best Rap Album ===
- **Da Brat – Funkdafied**
  - Dis-n-Dat – Bumpin'
  - TLC – CrazySexyCool

=== R&B/Soul or Rap Song of the Year ===
- **Brandy – "I Wanna Be Down"**
  - Brownstone – "If You Love Me"
  - Janet Jackson – "Any Time, Any Place"
  - TLC – "Creep"

=== Best R&B/Soul or Rap Music Video ===
- **Mary J. Blige – "I'm Going Down"**
  - Anita Baker – "I Apologize"
  - Janet Jackson – "You Want This"
  - TLC – "Creep"

=== Best Gospel Album ===
- **Helen Baylor – The Live Experience**
  - GMWA Woman of Worship – It's Our Time
  - Dorothy Norwood – Live with the Georgia Mass Choir
  - Dottie Peoples – On Times God

=== Best Jazz Album ===
- **Geri Allen – Twenty One**
  - Patti Austin – That Secret Place
  - Cassandra Wilson – Blue Light 'til Dawn
  - Nancy Wilson – Love, Nancy

== Presenters ==
- Xscape and Jody Watley – Presented Best R&B/Soul Single – Group, Band or Duo
- Tisha Campbell and BlackGirl – Presented Best R&B/Soul or Rap Music Video
- Jermaine Dupri, Mark Curry and Lela Rochon – Presented Best R&B/Soul Single Solo
- Immature and Helen Baylor – Presented Best Jazz Album
- Stevie Wonder – Presented Aretha Franklin. Award for Entertainer of the Year
- Changing Faces, Steve Harvey and Cassandra Wilson – Presented Best R&B/Soul or Rap New Artist
- Aaliyah, Total and Stacey Dash – Presented Best Rap Album
- Brandy, Dis-n-Dat and Kenya Moore – Presented Best Gospel Album
- Johnnie Cochran – Presented Lena Horne Award for Career Achievement
- Da Brat, Monica and Dorien Wilson – Presented R&B/Soul or Rap Song of the Year
- Naughty By Nature and Dianne Reeves – Presented Best R&B/Soul Album – Group, Band or Duo
- Brownstone and Arthel Neville – Presented Best R&B/Soul Album – Solo
