= Jock Jams, Volume 1 =

Album released in 1995

Compilation album by Various artists
- Released: July 25, 1995
- Genre: Dance
- Length: 59:31
- Label: Tommy Boy Records
- Producer: ESPN

Jock Jams chronology
Jock Jams, Volume 1 (1995)	Jock Jams, Volume 2 (1996)

Professional ratings
Review scores
Source	Rating
AllMusic	4/5 stars

Jock Jams, Volume 1 is the first album in the Jock Jams compilation album series, released in July 1995.

Two years after this album was released, "Jock Jam Megamix" was released, containing songs from this album and the next two.

== Track listing ==
1. Michael Buffer - "Let's Get Ready to Rumble" 0:25
2. 2 Unlimited - "Get Ready for This" 3:25
3. Tag Team - "Whoomp! (There It Is)" 3:43
4. Black Box - "Strike It Up" 3:35
5. 69 Boyz - "Tootsee Roll" 4:03
6. "Pump It Up, Go 'Head, Go 'Head" 0:17
7. K7 - "Come Baby Come" 3:55
8. Rob Base and DJ E-Z Rock - "It Takes Two" 4:32
9. "Gridiron Groove" 0:16
10. C&C Music Factory - "Gonna Make You Sweat (Everybody Dance Now)" 4:01
11. Naughty by Nature - "Hip Hop Hooray" 3:51
12. M/A/R/R/S - "Pump Up the Volume" 3:58
13. Snap! - "The Power" 4:12
14. "Uh, Ungawaa!" 0:19
15. EMF - "Unbelievable" 3:27
16. Village People - "YMCA" 4:40
17. Technotronic - "Pump Up the Jam" 3:58
18. 2 Unlimited - "Twilight Zone" 3:24
19. Ray Castoldi - "The Old Ballgame" 0:38
20. Gary Glitter - "Rock and Roll Part 2 (Hey Song)" 2:58

== Charts ==
=== Weekly charts ===
Chart (1995)	Peak position
US Billboard 200	30
US Top R&B/Hip-Hop Albums (Billboard)	33

=== Year-end charts ===
Chart (1995)	Position
US Billboard 200	184
Chart (1996)	Position
US Billboard 200	69
