= 1996 Soul Train Lady of Soul Awards =

American awards show

Soul Train Lady of Soul Awards
- Date: September 9, 1996
- Location: Santa Monica Civic Auditorium, Santa Monica, California
- Country: United States
- Hosted by: Queen Latifah, Peabo Bryson, Veronica Webb

Highlights
- Most awards: Faith Evans (2)

The 1996 Soul Train Lady of Soul Awards were held on September 9, 1996 at the Santa Monica Civic Auditorium in Santa Monica, California. Produced by Don Cornelius Productions, the program was hosted by Queen Latifah, Peabo Bryson, and Veronica Webb. George Duke served as the show's music director.

== Special awards ==
=== Aretha Franklin Award for Entertainer of the Year ===
- Brandy

=== Lena Horne Award for Outstanding Career Achievement ===
- Vanessa Williams

== Winners and nominees ==
Winners are in bold text.

=== Best R&B/Soul Single – Solo ===
- **Mary J. Blige – "Not Gon' Cry"**
  - Faith Evans – "Soon as I Get Home"
  - Whitney Houston – "Exhale (Shoop Shoop)"
  - Monica – "Before You Walk Out of My Life"

=== Best R&B/Soul Single – Group, Band or Duo ===
- **TLC – "Waterfalls"**
  - Groove Theory – "Tell Me"
  - Total – "Kissin' You"
  - Xscape – "Who Can I Run To"

=== R&B/Soul Album of the Year – Solo ===
- **Faith Evans – Faith**
  - Mariah Carey – Daydream
  - Randy Crawford – Naked and True
  - Monica – Miss Thang

=== R&B/Soul Album of the Year – Group, Band or Duo ===
- **Xscape – Off the Hook**
  - Pure Soul – Pure Soul
  - Groove Theory – Groove Theory
  - Total – Total

=== Best R&B/Soul or Rap New Artist ===
- **Faith Evans – "Soon as I Get Home"**
  - Bahamadia – "Uknowhowwedu"
  - Groove Theory – "Tell Me"
  - Nonchalant – "5 O'Clock"

=== Best R&B/Soul or Rap Music Video ===
- **MC Lyte – "Keep On Keepin' On"**
  - Nonchalant – "5 O'Clock"
  - Salt-N-Pepa – "Ain't Nuthin' But a She Thing"
  - TLC – "Waterfalls"

=== Best Gospel Album ===
- **Yolanda Adams – More Than a Melody**
  - Shirley Caesar – Shirley Caesar Live...He Will Come
  - GMWA Woman of Worship – Jeses Is the Name
  - CeCe Winans – Alone in His Presence'

=== Best Jazz Album ===
- **Cassandra Wilson – New Moon Daughter**
  - Dee Dee Bridgewater – Love and Peace: A Tribute to Horace Silver
  - Etta James – Time After Time
  - Diana Krall – All for You: A Dedication to the Nat King Cole Trio

=== R&B/Soul Composer of the Year ===
- **Marqueze Etheridge, Lisa Lopes, Organized Noize – "Waterfalls"**
  - Andrea Martin, Carsten Schack, Kenneth Karlin – "Before You Walk Out of My Life"
  - Whitney Houston, Babyface, Michael Houston – "Count On Me"
  - Faith Evans, Sean Combs, Chucky Thompson – "Soon as I Get Home"

== Presenters ==
- LL Cool J, MC Lyte, Robert Townsend and Zhané - Presented Best R&B/Soul Single Solo
- Lisa Leslie, Total and Chantay Savage - Presented Best R&B/Soul or Rap New Artist
- Jesse Jackson - Presented Aretha Franklin. Award for Entertainer of the Year
- Da Brat, Mark Curry and Pure Soul - Best Jazz Album
- Mary J. Blige, Shemar Moore and 702 - Presented R&B/Soul or Rap Composer of the Year
- Faith Evans, Steve Harvey and Dru Hill - Presented Best Gospel Album
- Jamie Foxx, Dorien Wilson and Shades - Presented Best R&B/Soul Single - Group, Band, Duo
- Arnold Schwarzenegger - Presented Lena Horne Award for Career Achievement
- Groove Theory, Tichina Arnold, John Witherspoon and Gail Devers - Presented Best R&B/Soul or Rap Music Video
- New Edition - Presented Best R&B/Soul Album - Group, Band or Duo
- Jermaine Dupri, Reagan Gomez-Preston, Tommy Ford and Nonchalant - Presented Best R&B/Soul Album - Solo
