= Jock Jams, Volume 5 =

Compilation album by Various artists
- Released: August 24, 1999
- Genre: Dance, hip hop, R&B
- Label: Tommy Boy Records
- Producer: ESPN

Jock Jams series chronology
Jock Jams, Volume 4 (1998)	Jock Jams, Volume 5 (1999)	Jock Jams: The All-Star Jock Jams (2001)

Professional ratings
Review scores
Source	Rating
Allmusic	3/5 stars

Jock Jams, Volume 5 is the fifth album in the Jock Jams compilation album series.

== Track listing ==
1. "Can You Feel It!" - Van Earl Wright
2. "Reach Up" - Perfecto All-Stars
3. "We Like to Party" - Vengaboys
4. "Ray of Light" - Madonna
5. "Miami" - Will Smith
6. "Turn It Up (Remix)/Fire It Up" - Busta Rhymes
7. "We Came to Play!" - The Jock Jams Cheerleaders
8. "I'm Gonna Get You" - Bizarre Inc.
9. "Nice and Slow" (Remix) - Usher
10. "Woof Woof" - 69 Boyz
11. "Mexican Hat Dance" - Ray Castoldi
12. "Nobody's Supposed to Be Here" (Remix) - Deborah Cox
13. "Feel It" - Tamperer featuring Maya
14. "Deep to Right Field!" - Van Earl Wright
15. "Too Close" (Remix) – Next
16. "Suavemente" (Remix) – Elvis Crespo
17. "You Ugly" – The Jock Jams Cheerleaders
18. "Burnin' Up" – Cevin Fisher
19. "All I Have to Give" (Remix) – Backstreet Boys
20. "Got to Be Real" – Cheryl Lynn
21. "Hit the Showers" – Van Earl Wright

== Charts ==
Chart (1999)	Peak position
U.S. Billboard 200	51
