= Jock Rock, Volume 2 =

Compilation album by Various artists
- Released: 1995
- Genre: Rock
- Label: Tommy Boy Records
- Producer: ESPN

Jock Rock series chronology
Jock Rock, Volume 1 (1994)	Jock Rock, Volume 2 (1995)	Jock Rock 2000 (1999)

Professional ratings
Review scores
Source	Rating
Allmusic	4/5 stars

Jock Rock, Volume 2 is the second album in the Jock Rock compilation album series, released in 1995.

== Track listing ==
1. "Sirius" – The Alan Parsons Project
2. "En Fuego " – Dan Patrick
3. "The Final Countdown" – Europe
4. "Rock and Roll All Nite" – Kiss
5. "Respect" – Aretha Franklin
6. "Wooly Bully" – Sam the Sham and the Pharaohs
7. "The Homecoming Game"
8. "Hold On! I'm Comin'" – Sam & Dave
9. "Low Rider" – War
10. "The Addams Family Theme" – Ray Castoldi
11. "Great Balls of Fire" – Jerry Lee Lewis
12. "Get Ready" – Rare Earth
13. "The Stadium Beat"
14. "I Want You Back" – The Jackson 5
15. "He Could Go All The Way!" – Chris Berman
16. "Nobody but Me" – The Human Beinz
17. "Cool Jerk" – The Capitols
18. "William Tell Overture" – Ray Castoldi
19. "Devil With The Blue Dress On/Good Golly Miss Molly" – Mitch Ryder & The Detroit Wheels
20. "The 300 Game"
21. "Twist & Shout" – The Isley Brothers
22. "Louie Louie" – The Kingsmen
23. "We Are the Champions – Queen

== Charts ==
Chart (1995)	Peak position
U.S. Billboard 200	121
