= Jock Rock 2000 =

Compilation album by Various artists
- Released: 1999
- Genre: Rock, alternative
- Label: Tommy Boy Records
- Producer: ESPN

Jock Rock series chronology
Jock Rock, Volume 2 (1995)	Jock Rock 2000 (1999)

Professional ratings
Review scores
Source	Rating
Allmusic	3/5 stars

Jock Rock 2000 is the third album in the Jock Rock series of compilation albums.

== Track listing ==
1. "Let's Get It On!" – Mills Lane
2. "Firestarter" – Prodigy
3. "It's All about the Benjamins (Rock Remix)" – Puff Daddy featuring Lil' Kim, The LOX and The Notorious B.I.G.
4. "Flagpole Sitta" – Harvey Danger
5. "Semi-Charmed Life" – Third Eye Blind
6. "One Week (Pull's Break Remix)" – Barenaked Ladies
7. "Go, Fight, Win!" – Bleacher Creatures
8. "Ready to Go (Rock version)" – Republica
9. "Machinehead" – Bush
10. "The Rockafeller Skank" – Fatboy Slim
11. "The Bleacher Creatures" – Bleacher Creatures
12. "Oh Yeah, All Right" – Local H
13. "Peppyrock" – BTK
14. "Put Your Hands Together!" – Bleacher Creatures
15. "Block Rockin' Beats" – The Chemical Brothers
16. "Zoot Suit Riot – Cherry Poppin' Daddies
17. "Walk This Way" – Aerosmith featuring Run-D.M.C.
18. "The Sportscenter Mega Mix" – Dan Patrick, Stuart Scott and Kenny Mayne
19. "Can't Wait One More Minute" – CIV
20. "Pump It Up" – Elvis Costello
21. "Down for the Count" – Mills Lane

== Charts ==
Chart (1999–2000)	Peak position
U.S. Billboard 200	78
