= Bumpin' (Dis-n-Dat album) =

1994 studio album by Dis-n-Dat

Studio album by Dis-n-Dat
- Released: October 11, 1994
- Recorded: 1993–1994
- Genre: Hip hop, Miami bass
- Length: 36:34
- Label: Epic Street/SME Records; EK 57625
- Producer: The Bass Mechanics (69 Boyz and Quad City DJ's)

Singles from Bumpin'
- 1. "Party" Released: 1994; 2. "Freak Me, Baby" Released: 1995

Bumpin' is the only studio album by hip hop duo Dis-n-Dat, released October 11, 1994, on Epic Records.

The album was produced by CC Lemonhead and Jay Ski, best known for their work with the popular Miami bass groups 95 South, 69 Boyz, and Quad City DJ's. Bumpin', however, failed to match the success of those groups, only making it to 53 on the R&B charts and 24 on the Heatseekers chart. Despite the album's failure, the single "Freak Me, Baby" peaked at #60 on the Billboard Hot 100, the duo's only single to chart. "Party" also found success on the R&B and hip hop charts and appeared on ESPN's Jock Jams, Volume 2.

== Track listing ==
1. "Party"- 4:51
2. "Whoot, Here It Is"- 4:09
3. "Do Dat Thang"- 4:29
4. "Freak Me, Baby"- 3:24
5. "Double D Bass"- :50
6. "Bumpin'"- 3:06
7. "Callin Cleotis"- :42
8. "Hotel, Motel"- 3:23
9. "Yeah, Just Hit Me"- 3:30
10. "Dis 'N' Dat"- 4:09

== Charts ==
Chart (1994)	Peak position
Billboard Top R&B Albums	53
Billboard Top Heatseekers	24
