= Jock Jams, Volume 2 =

Compilation album by various artists
- Released: August 20, 1996
- Genre: Dance
- Length: 53:52
- Label: Tommy Boy
- Producer: Patrick Edmonds; Ray Castoldi

Jock Jams series chronology
| Jock Jams, Volume 1 (1995) | Jock Jams, Volume 2 (1996) | Jock Jams, Volume 3 (1997) |

Professional ratings
Review scores
| Source | Rating |
|---|---|
| AllMusic | 3/5 stars |

Jock Jams, Volume 2 is the second album in the Jock Jams compilation album series, presented by American international basic cable sports channel ESPN. It was released on August 20, 1996 via Tommy Boy Records. It peaked at number 10 on the US Billboard 200 albums charts. The Recording Industry Association of America certified the compilation platinum on November 1, 1996 and two times platinum on November 10, 1999.

== Track listing ==
| No. | Title | Performer(s) | Length |
|---|---|---|---|
| 1. | "Welcome to the Big Show" | Dan Patrick and Chris Berman | 0:07 |
| 2. | "No Limit" | 2 Unlimited | 3:01 |
| 3. | "Everybody Everybody" | Black Box | 4:04 |
| 4. | "1, 2, 3, 4 (Sumpin' New)" | Coolio | 3:08 |
| 5. | "We Got a Love Thang" | CeCe Peniston | 3:51 |
| 6. | "This Is Your Night" | Amber | 3:14 |
| 7. | "Hey, Hey You" | The Jock Jams Cheerleaders | 0:38 |
| 8. | "This Is How We Do It" | Montell Jordan | 3:18 |
| 9. | "Set It Off" | Strafe | 3:48 |
| 10. | "Macarena" | Los del Mar | 3:52 |
| 11. | "I Like to Move It" | Reel 2 Real | 3:40 |
| 12. | "Groovin' in the Bleachers" | The Jock Jams Cheerleaders | 0:25 |
| 13. | "Party" | Dis N' Dat | 3:52 |
| 14. | "Get Down Tonight" | KC and the Sunshine Band | 3:06 |
| 15. | "Give It Up" | The Goodmen | 2:58 |
| 16. | "Action, Boys, Action" | The Jock Jams Cheerleaders | 0:27 |
| 17. | "The Bomb" | The Bucketheads | 3:22 |
| 18. | "Boom Boom Boom" | The Outhere Brothers | 3:08 |
| 19. | "What's Up?" | DJ Miko | 3:54 |
| 20. | "Happy and You Know It" | Ray Castoldi | 0:37 |
| 21. | "Macho Man" | Village People | 3:26 |
| Total length: | | | 53:52 |

== Charts ==
=== Weekly charts ===
| Chart (1996) | Peak position |
|---|---|
| US Billboard 200 | 10 |

=== Year-end charts ===
| Chart (1996) | Position |
|---|---|
| US Billboard 200 | 108 |

== Certifications ==
| Region | Certification | Certified units/sales |
|---|---|---|
| United States (RIAA) | 2× Platinum | 2,000,000^{^} |
^{^} Shipments figures based on certification alone.
