= Secret Love (Kim Sozzi song) =

Single by Kim Sozzi

from the album Just One Day
- Released: 2010
- Recorded: 2001
- Genre: Electronic dance, house
- Length: 3:30
- Label: Ultra
- Songwriter(s): Kim Sozzi
- Producer(s): Kim Sozzi, Josh Harris

Kim Sozzi singles chronology
"Kiss Me Back" (2009)	"Secret Love" (2010)	"Just One Day" (2010)

"Secret Love" is an Electronica/Dance single from American singer/songwriter Kim Sozzi that was originally recorded in 2001 but was rerecorded and released in 2010 with new mixes. The track is the third single release from her 2009 album "Just One Day" and is the follow-up track to "Kiss Me Back" and "Feel Your Love." It is also the third number one single on the Hot Dance Airplay Chart for Sozzi.

== Track listing ==
Digital download

1. "Secret Love" (Josh Harris Radio Edit) – 3:34
2. "Secret Love" (Josh Harris Radio Edit with Intro) – 3:48
3. "Secret Love" (Josh Harris Bedtime Remix) – 3:36
4. "Secret Love" (Wendel Kos Radio Edit) – 3:42
5. "Secret Love" (Wendel Kos First Sunlight Remix) – 7:34
6. "Secret Love" (Wendel Kos First Sunlight Remix Dub) – 6:27
7. "Secret Love" (Stellar Project Radio Edit) – 3:05
8. "Secret Love" (Stellar Project Remix) – 6:11

== Chart positions ==
- Hot Dance Airplay: #1
