= Kiss Me Back =

Single by Kim Sozzi

from the album Just One Day
- Released: 2009
- Recorded: 2009
- Genre: Electronic dance, house
- Length: 2:50
- Label: Ultra
- Songwriters: Kim Sozzi, Jeff Martens

Kim Sozzi singles chronology
"Feel Your Love" (2008)	"Kiss Me Back" (2009)	"Secret Love" (2010)

"Kiss Me Back" is name of a 2009 Electronica/Dance single from American singer and songwriter Kim Sozzi. The track is featured on her 2009 album Just One Day and is the follow-up track to "Feel Your Love," which also went to number one on the Billboard Hot Dance Airplay Chart in 2008.

== Track listing ==
Digital download

1. "Kiss Me Back (Cry Tonight)" (Radio Edit) – 2:57
2. "Kiss Me Back (Cry Tonight)" (Jeff Martens Remix) – 5:28

== Chart positions ==
- Hot Dance Airplay: #1
