= Jock Rock, Volume 1 =

Compilation album by Various artists
- Released: 1994
- Genre: Rock
- Label: Tommy Boy Records
- Producer: ESPN

Jock Rock series chronology
Jock Rock, Volume 1 (1994)	Jock Rock, Volume 2 (1995)

Professional ratings
Review scores
Source	Rating
Allmusic	link

Jock Rock, Volume 1 is the first album in the Jock Rock compilation album series, released in 1994. The following year, it was certified gold in the United States.

== Track listing ==
1. "And the home of the..."
2. "We Will Rock You" – Queen
3. "Charge"
4. "Blitzkrieg Bop" – The Ramones
5. "Rock and Roll (Part 2)" – Gary Glitter
6. "Let's Go!"
7. "Mony Mony" – Tommy James and the Shondells
8. "Shotgun" – Junior Walker & the All Stars
9. "He Shoots! He Scores!"
10. "I Got You (I Feel Good)" – James Brown
11. "Who Wants a Hot Dog?"
12. "Tequila" – The Champs
13. "Make Some Noise"
14. "Dance to the Music" – Sly and the Family Stone
15. "Born to Be Wild" – Steppenwolf
16. "Dee-fense!"
17. "What I Like About You" – The Romantics
18. "Shout!" – The Isley Brothers
19. "Takin' Care of Business" – Bachman-Turner Overdrive
20. "Three Point Goal!"
21. "Bang the Drum All Day" – Todd Rundgren
22. "Na Na Hey Hey Kiss Him Goodbye" – Steam
23. "And That's The End of the Ballgame"
24. "SportsCenter Theme ("Da Da Da")

== Charts ==
=== Weekly charts ===
Chart (1994)	Peak position
US Billboard 200	79

=== Year-end charts ===
Chart (1995)	Position
US Billboard 200	184
