= Jock Jams, Volume 3 =

Compilation album by Various artists
- Released: September 9, 1997
- Genre: Dance
- Length: 60:23
- Label: Tommy Boy Records
- Producer: ESPN

Jock Jams series chronology
Jock Jams, Volume 2 (1996)	Jock Jams, Volume 3 (1997)	Jock Jams, Volume 4 (1998)

Professional ratings
Review scores
Source	Rating
Allmusic	3/5 stars

Jock Jams, Volume 3 was the third album in the Jock Jams compilation album series.

It contained the single "The Jock Jam" (or "ESPN Presents the Jock Jam"), which peaked at #31 on the U.S. Billboard Hot 100 and was certified gold by the RIAA for sales of over 500,000 copies.

== Track listing ==
1. "It's Awesome Baby!" – Dick Vitale
2. "Tribal Dance" - 2 Unlimited
3. "Ready to Go" – Republica
4. "I Like It Like That" – Tito Nieves
5. "C'mon N' Ride It (The Train)" – Quad City DJ's
6. "Let's Go" – The Jock Jams Cheerleaders
7. "Da' Dip" – Freak Nasty
8. "Jump!" – The Movement
9. "R.O.W.D.I.E." – The Jock Jams Cheerleaders
10. "Jellyhead" – Crush
11. "No Diggity" – BLACKstreet featuring Dr. Dre
12. "The Chant" – The Jock Jams Cheerleaders
13. "Let Me Clear My Throat" – DJ Kool
14. "That's the Way (I Like It)" – KC & The Sunshine Band
15. "Supersonic" – Sabrina Sang
16. "Fired Up!" – Funky Green Dogs
17. "Robi Rob's Boriqua Anthem" – C+C Music Factory
18. "Don't Stop Movin'" – Livin' Joy
19. "Don't Stop, Get It, Get It!!" – The Jock Jams Cheerleaders
20. "Cotton Eye Joe" – Rednex
21. "The Jock Jam Mega Mix"
22. "The Chicken Dance" – Ray Castoldi

== Charts ==
=== Weekly charts ===
Chart (1997)	Peak position
US Billboard 200	23

=== Year-end charts ===
Chart (1997)	Position
US Billboard 200	178
