= Jock Jams, Volume 4 =

Compilation album by Various artists
- Released: August 25, 1998
- Genre: Dance, hip hop, pop
- Label: Tommy Boy Records
- Producer: ESPN

Jock Jams series chronology
Jock Jams, Volume 3 (1997)	Jock Jams, Volume 4 (1998)	Jock Jams, Volume 5 (1999)

Professional ratings
Review scores
Source	Rating
Allmusic	3/5 stars

Jock Jams, Volume 4 is the fourth album in the Jock Jams compilation album series.

== Track listing ==
1. "Yeah Baby!" – Austin Powers
2. "Unlimited Megajam" – 2 Unlimited
3. "Mo Money Mo Problems" – Notorious B.I.G.
4. "Can You Feel It" – 3rd Party
5. "Space Jam" – Quad City DJ's
6. "Watch Out We're Here" – The Jock Jams Cheerleaders
7. "Raise the Roof" – Luke
8. "Gettin' Jiggy wit It" – Will Smith
9. "Everybody (Backstreet's Back)" – Backstreet Boys
10. "No One Pushes Us Around" – J.K. Simmons
11. "Going Out of My Head" – Fatboy Slim
12. "Hear the Organ Get Wicked" – Ray Castoldi
13. "Mueve La Cadera (Move Your Body)" – Reel 2 Real
14. "Push It" – Salt-n-Pepa
15. "Seventh Inning Stretch" – Bob Sheppard (P.A. Announcer for the N.Y. Yankees)
16. "Jump Around" – House of Pain
17. "One More Night" – Amber
18. "Beautiful Day" – Hypertrophy
19. "Be Aggressive" – The Jock Jam Cheerleaders
20. "Get Ready to Bounce" – Brooklyn Bounce
21. "Tubthumping" – Chumbawamba
22. "Good Night" – Bob Sheppard
23. "Son of Jock Jam (Mega Mix)" – Jock Jam All Stars

== Charts ==
=== Weekly charts ===
Chart (1998)	Peak position
US Billboard 200	20
US Top R&B/Hip-Hop Albums (Billboard)	43

=== Year-end charts ===
Chart (1998)	Position
US Billboard 200	166
Chart (1999)	Position
US Billboard 200	155
