= Until the Day =

Studio album by Nonchalant
- Released: March 26, 1996
- Recorded: 1994–1996
- Studio: B.L.A.K. Hole Studios (Capitol Heights, MD); Cue Recording Studios (Falls Church, VA); Horizon Studios (Capital Heights, MD); Talamasca Sound (Glen Cove, NY)
- Genre: Hip hop
- Length: 47:47
- Label: MCA
- Producer: Alonzo "Lonnie" Simmons, Jr.; Chucky Thompson; Dewayne "Bam" Staten, Sr.; Kapin; Mark Murray

Singles from Until the Day
- 1. "5 O'Clock" Released: February 6, 1996; 2. "Until the Day" Released: August 13, 1996

Until the Day is the only studio album by American rapper Nonchalant. It was released on March 26, 1996, via MCA Records. Recording sessions took place at B.L.A.K. Hole Studios and Horizon Studios in Capitol Heights, Maryland, at Cue Recording Studios in Falls Church, Virginia and at Talamasca Sound in Glen Cove, New York. Production was handled by Alonzo "Lonnie" Simmons Jr., Dewayne "Bam" Staten Sr., Kapin, Chucky Thompson and Mark Murray, with Nicole Bernard serving as executive producer. The album peaked at number 94 on the Billboard 200 and number 20 on the Top R&B Albums, spending six weeks on the former and 10 weeks on the latter.

The album produced two singles: "5 O'Clock" and "Until the Day". Its lead single, "5 O'Clock", reached No. 24 on the Billboard 200 and No. 8 on the Hot R&B/Hip-Hop Songs in the United States, No. 30 in Germany, and No. 44 on the UK Singles Chart. It was also certified Gold by the Recording Industry Association of America on May 1, 1996, for selling 500,000 units in the US. A follow-up single, "Until the Day", achieved minor success, making it to No. 88 on the Hot R&B/Hip-Hop Songs.

== Critical reception ==
Professional ratings
Review scores
Source	Rating
AllMusic	4/5 stars
laut.de	5/5 stars
Muzik	4/5 stars

AllMusic's Alex Henderson gave the album four stars out of a possible five, saying: "Until the Day is an album that, for the most part, is as solid lyrically as it is musically and rhythmically. The R&B-drenched tracks are consistently appealing, and Nonchalant's lyrics are memorable whether she's rapping about relationships or addressing socio-political concerns".

== Track listing ==
No.	Title	Writer(s)	Producer(s)	Length
1.	"Intro"	Tanya Pointer; Alonzo Simmons, Jr.; DeWayne Staten, Sr.; Kapin L. Ferguson, Jr.; Anthony "Chuck" Morton	Lonnie; Bam; Kapin	1:54
2.	"It's All Love"	Carl Thompson; Daoud Baptiste	Chucky Thompson	4:59
3.	"Crab Rappers"	Pointer; Simmons, Jr.; Staten, Sr.; Ferguson, Jr.	Lonnie; Bam; Kapin	4:28
4.	"5 O'Clock"	Pointer; Simmons, Jr.; Staten, Sr.; Ferguson, Jr.; Raguel Dill; Andre "Smoovy" Harrison	Lonnie; Bam; Kapin	4:47
5.	"Lookin' Good to Me"	Pointer; Simmons, Jr.; Staten, Sr.; Ferguson, Jr.	Lonnie; Bam; Kapin	4:27
6.	"Kickin' It with Non"	Pointer; Simmons, Jr.; Staten, Sr.; Ferguson, Jr.	Lonnie; Bam; Kapin	0:50
7.	"Have a Good Time"	Pointer; Simmons, Jr.; Staten, Sr.; Ferguson, Jr.	Lonnie; Bam; Kapin	4:53
8.	"Lights N' Sirens"	Pointer; Simmons, Jr.; Staten, Sr.; Ferguson, Jr.	Lonnie; Bam; Kapin	4:15
9.	"Non Interlude"	Pointer; Simmons, Jr.; Staten, Sr.; Ferguson, Jr.	Lonnie; Bam; Kapin	1:31
10.	"Until the Day"	Quasim Baptiste; Thompson; D. Baptiste	Chucky Thompson	4:44
11.	"Mr. Good Stuff"	Pointer; Simmons, Jr.; Staten, Sr.; Ferguson, Jr.	Lonnie; Bam; Kapin	5:04
12.	"Thank You"	Pointer; Mark Murray	Mark Murray; Leonardo Pettis (co.)	4:23
13.	"Outro"	Simmons, Jr.; Staten, Sr.; Ferguson, Jr.	Lonnie; Bam; Kapin	1:32
Total length:				47:47

== Personnel ==
- Tanya "Nonchalant" Pointer – vocals, sleeve notes
- Michelle Blackwell – backing vocals (tracks: 2, 10)
- Quasim Baptiste – rap vocals (track 10)
- George Franklin Jackson III – backing vocals (track 10)
- Leonardo Pettis – backing vocals & co-producer (track 12)
- Alonzo "Lonnie" Simmons Jr. – guitar (tracks: 4, 11), producer (tracks: 1, 3–9, 11, 13)
- James Barry – guitar (track 12)
- DeWayne "Bam" Staten Sr. – producer (tracks: 1, 3–9, 11, 13)
- Kapin L. Ferguson Jr. – producer (tracks: 1, 3–9, 11, 13)
- Carl "Chucky" Thompson – producer (tracks: 2, 10), mixing (track 2)
- Mark Murray – producer (track 12)
- B.L.A.K. Productions – recording (tracks: 1, 3–9, 11, 13), mixing (tracks: 1, 3–9, 13), tracking (tracks: 1, 3, 5–9, 13)
- Chris Murphy – recording (track 2)
- Ken Schubert – engineering (track 2), recording & mixing (track 10)
- Doug Johnson – recording (track 10)
- Bill Appleberry – recording (track 10)
- Waveform 7 Productions – recording (track 12)
- Prince Charles Alexander – mixing (track 12)
- Josh Wertheimer – engineering assistant (track 12)
- Chris Gehringer – mastering
- Nicole Bernard – executive producer
- Kenny Gravillis – art direction, design
- Danny Clinch – photography
- Stefan Campbell – stylist

== Charts ==
Chart performance for Until the Day
Chart (1996)	Peak position
US Billboard 200	94
US Top R&B Albums (Billboard)	20
