= Deep Inside =

1999 single by Mary J. Blige

Single by Mary J. Blige

from the album Mary
- Released: October 12, 1999
- Length: 5:26
- Label: MCA
- Songwriters: Mary J. Blige; Tara Geter; Kevin Deane; Elton John; Bernie Taupin
- Producer: Deane

Mary J. Blige singles chronology
"All That I Can Say" (1999)	"Deep Inside" (1999)	"Give Me You" (2000)

"Deep Inside" is a song by the American singer Mary J. Blige. It was written by Blige, Tara Geter, and Kevin Deane for Blige's fourth studio album, Mary (1999), while production was led by Deane. The song features a sample of piano playing from Elton John's "Bennie and the Jets" (1974). John and co-writer Bernie Taupin are also credited as songwriters.

The song was released as the second US single from Mary and the third single elsewhere. Like the preceding single, "All That I Can Say" (1999), it was a moderate success in the United States, peaking at number 51 on the Billboard Hot 100. In the United Kingdom, it failed to enter the UK Singles Chart top 40. The music video for "Deep Inside" has Blige and her dancers performing to the song "Sincerity", which appears on the deluxe edition of the Mary album in the United States and the United Kingdom single of "Deep Inside".

== Music video ==
The music video was shot on October 8, 1999, in New York City and was directed by Marcus Raboy. Another version of the music video has Elton John playing the piano. "Deep Inside" was premiered on November 10, 1999, on MTV during a season finale of the adults-only animated TV show, Beavis and Butt-head.

In the beginning, Blige steps on the stage, wearing a blonde glitter dress, before the screen fades out, flashing back all of the music videos that starred Blige herself, including "Love Is All We Need", "Seven Days", "Everything", "Be Happy", "I'm Goin' Down", "You Bring Me Joy", "Real Love" and "I Can Love You". The next scene begins with two security guards blocking the red carpet and Blige begins singing. After the first verse, she stands on the red carpet waving her hands at the whole audience taking pictures of her. She steps inside the tour bus looking in the mirror at herself, pushing her hand singing the hook.

In the next scene, Blige walks out of a 1997 Dodge Caravan, talking off a hoodie being exposed. Then she walks away from an electrical fence with a bronze-raccoon coat and a white tank. She stands in a Harlem neighborhood with the Manhattan Bridge mocking her 15 feet away. The next scene starts with black-suited dancers and Blige in a red suit dancing to her song "Sincerity". After the song ends, they clearly dance to "Deep Inside", with Blige singing loudly by herself. She looks at the screen screaming her quote "MJB" at the end of the song, where the Manhattan Bridge is shown.

== Track listings ==
UK CD 1 – MCSTD 40224

1. "Deep Inside" (Radio Edit) – 3:49
2. "Deep Inside" (Hex Hector Remix) – 8:27
3. "Let No Man Put Asunder" (Maurice Joshua Remix) – 5:23

UK CD 2 – MCXTD 40224

1. "Deep Inside" (Stargate Radio Mix) – 4:20
2. "Sincerity" (featuring DMX and Nas) – 5:15
3. "Deep Inside" (Stargate Double Remix) – 6:37

UK 12-inch single – MCST 40224

1. "Deep Inside" (Hex Hector Remix) – 8:27
2. "Sincerity" (featuring DMX and Nas) – 5:15
3. "Let No Man Put Asunder" (Maurice Joshua Remix) – 5:23

Italian 12-inch single 1 – NL 19-99

1. "Deep Inside" (Hex Hector Remix) – 8:27
2. "Deep Inside" (Stargate Double Remix) – 6:37
3. "Deep Inside" (Hex Hector Radio Edit) – 4:22
4. "Deep Inside" (Radio Edit) – 3:49

Italian 12-inch single 2 – NL 23-99

1. "Deep Inside" (Hex Hector Remix) – 8:27
2. "Let No Man Put Asunder" (Maurice Joshua Remix) – 5:23
3. "Let No Man Put Asunder" (Silk's House Mix) – 4:46

French 12-inch single – 155 703-1

1. "Deep Inside" (Kojak Extended version) – 6:19
2. "Deep Inside" (Kojak Edit version) – 3:47
3. "Deep Inside" (Kojak Main version) – 5:02

== Personnel ==
Personnel are adapted from the Mary liner notes.

- Mary J. Blige – lead vocals, songwriter
- Elton John – acoustic piano, songwriting (sample)
- Dustin Adams - background vocals
- Kevin Deane – additional instruments, songwriting
- Tara Geter – songwriting
- Terri Robinson - background vocals
- Bernie Taupin – songwriting (sample)

== Charts ==
=== Weekly charts ===
Chart (1999–2000)	Peak position
Netherlands (Dutch Top 40)	40
Netherlands (Single Top 100)	81
Scotland Singles (OCC)	77
UK Singles (OCC)	42
UK Dance (OCC)	8
UK Hip Hop/R&B (OCC)	10
US Billboard Hot 100	51
US Hot R&B/Hip-Hop Songs (Billboard)	9

=== Year-end charts ===
Chart (2000)	Position
US Hot R&B/Hip-Hop Singles & Tracks (Billboard)	67

== Release history ==
Region	Date	Format(s)	Label	Ref.
United States	October 12, 1999	Rhythmic contemporary; urban radio	MCA	
United Kingdom	November 29, 1999	12-inch vinyl; CD	MCA	
New Zealand	December 13, 1999	CD	MCA	
