= Still Not Sorry =

Studio album by MYNT
- Released: November 15, 2005
- Recorded: 2004–2005
- Genres: Electronica, dance
- Label: Ultra Records
- Producers: Patrick Moxey, Rich Pangilinan

Still Not Sorry is the debut album by the New York trio MYNT. The album did not appear on any of the Billboard charts, though their first single "How Did You Know" peaked at #3 in the Hot Dance Airplay chart and #97 Billboard Hot 100. Following singles included "Stay", "Still Not Sorry" and "You're the Only One."

== Track listing ==
1. "How Did You Know" – 3:49
2. "Stay" – 3:17
3. "Still Not Sorry" (featuring Marisol Angelique) – 3:24
4. "Playa Haters" – 2:48
5. "You're the Only One" – 3:51
6. "Take Me Home" (featuring Marisol Angelique) – 3:44
7. "Kiss Me (Besame)" (featuring Marisol Angelique) – 3:35
8. "Back in Love" – 3:25
9. "Takin' Over" (featuring Marisol Angelique) – 4:12
10. "Send Me an Angel" – 3:19
11. "Stay" [Valentin Remix] – 3:12
12. "Still Not Sorry" [Mr Sam Radio Remix] – 4:12

== Personnel ==
Person	Task(s)
Ray Balconis	Vocal producer
Albert Castillo	Vocals, Producer
Kim Clarke	Make-up
Dominique Keegan	Stylist
Patrick Moxey	Executive producer
Rich Pangilinan	Executive producer, A&R
Kim Sozzi	Vocals
David Waxman	A&R

== Singles ==
=== How Did You Know? ===
"How Did You Know" cover

"How Did You Know?" was the first single from the album. It was the only single that has ever charted in the American charts to date.

- Released: June 1, 2004
- Writers: K. Khaleel, R. Sutcliffe
- Chart positions: #97 (US Hot 100), #3 (US Hot Dance Airplay)
- Track listing:
1. "How Do You Know?" [Mynt Original Radio] – 3:49
2. "How Do You Know?" [Mynt Original Extended] – 7:48
3. "How Do You Know?" [Mynt Original Instrumental] – 4:49
4. "How Do You Know?" [TV track] – 4:49
5. "How Do You Know?" [Kryia vs. Velez Remix Radio] – 4:36
6. "How Do You Know?" [Kryia vs. Velez Remix Extended] – 6:10

=== Stay ===
"Stay" was the second single from the album. It was released on digital download and 12" vinyl single.

- Released: March 8, 2005
- Writers: Axwell, George Nakas, Roger Olsson, Klas V. Wahl, Liz Winstanley
- Chart positions: #10 (US Hot Dance Airplay)

=== Back in Love ===
"Back in Love" cover

"Stay" was the third single from the album. It was also released digitally and 12" vinyl single.

- Released: August 9/September 6, 2005
- Writers: Greg Bonnick, Jenna Gibbons, John Lind, Martin George Page, Leontyne Price
- Chart positions: —
- Track listing:
1. "Back in Love" [Radio Edit] – 3:22
2. "Back in Love" [Mixshow Edit] – 6:17
3. "Back in Love" [Lee/Cabrera Main Mix] – 8:24
4. "Back in Love" [Lee/Cabrera Dub] – 6:55

=== Still Not Sorry ===
"Still Not Sorry" cover

"Still Not Sorry" was the fourth single from the album. Although it never appeared on any American charts, the "Mr Sam Radio Remix" of the song is their signature-song. The song is their best-known song among the public. Also, the song was used during Britney Spears' The Onyx Hotel Tour tour in Scandinavia.

- Released: October 11, 2005
- Writer: George Samuelson
- Chart positions: —
- Track listing:
1. "Still Not Sorry" [Al B. Rich Radio Edit] – 3:56
2. "Still Not Sorry" [Al B. Rich Club Mix] – 7:01
3. "Still Not Sorry" [Mr Sam Vocal Radio Edit] – 4:10
4. "Still Not Sorry" [Mr Sam Dub Radio Edit] – 4:11
5. "Still Not Sorry" [Mr Sam Vocal Mix] – 8:43
6. "Still Not Sorry" [Mr Sam Dub Mix] – 8:43
7. "Still Not Sorry" [Josh Harris Remix] – 7:47

=== You're the Only One ===
"You're the Only One" cover

"You're the Only One" was the fifth and last single from the album. The song was only released on iTunes.

- Released: April 11, 2006
- Writers: Albert Castillo and Rich "DJ Riddler" Pangilinan
- Chart positions: —
- Track listing:
1. "You're the Only One" – 3:48
2. "You're the Only One" [Al B. Rich Club Mix] – 8:14

== Song information ==
1. "How Did You Know"
  Licensed from Neutone Recordings
  Written by K. Khaleel & R. Sutcliffe Published by EMI Colgems, Copyright Control
  Produced by Albert Castillo and Rich "DJ Riddler" Pangilinan for Al B. Rich Music Group
  Vocal Performance by Kim Sozzi
2. "Stay"
  Music & Lyrics: Klas Wahl / Roger Olsson / Axwell / George Nakas / Liz Winstanley. Published by: Universal Music Publishing AB / Universal Music Publishing Ltd.
  Produced by Albert Castillo and Rich "DJ Riddler" Pangilinan for Al B. Rich Music Group Vocal #:Performance by Kim Sozzi
3. "Still Not Sorry"
  Written and composed by George Samuelson. Published by EMI Music Publishing Scandinavia (BMI)
  Produced by Albert Castillo and Rich "DJ Riddler" Pangilinan for Al B. Rich Music Group Vocal
  Performance by Marisol Angelique Solorzano
4. "Playa Haters"
  Produced and Written by Albert Castillo and Rich "DJ Riddler" Pangilinan for Al B. Rich Music Group /ASCAP
  Vocal Performance by Albert Castillo and Rich "DJ Riddler" Pangilinan
5. "You're the Only One"
  Produced and Written by Albert Castillo and Rich "DJ Riddler" Pangilinan for Al B. Rich Music Group /ASCAP. Lyrics by Robert de Fresnes © Big Life Music / Distinctive Music
  Vocal Performance by Joe Murena
6. "Take Me Home"
  Produced and Written by Marisol Angelique Solorzano, Albert Castillo and Rich "DJ Riddler" Pangilinan
  for AL B. RICH MUSIC GROUP/ASCAP
  Vocal Performance by Marisol Angelique Solorzano
7. "Kiss Me (Besame)"
  Produced and Written by Marisol Angelique Solorzano, Albert Castillo and Rich "DJ Riddler" Pangilinan for Al B. Rich Music Group/ASCAP
  Vocal Performance by Marisol Angelique Solorzano
8. "Back in Love"
  Written by: Greg Bonnick/Leon Price/Jenna Gibbons/Martin George Page/John Lind. Published by: EMI Music Publishing Ltd./EMI Songs Ltd./EMI April Music Inc. (ASCAP)/EMI Blackwood Music Inc. (BMI)/Zomba Music Publishing Ltd./Charleville Music/Deertrack Music. Produced by Albert Castillo and Rich "DJ Riddler" Pangilinan for Al B. Rich Music Group.
  Vocal Performance by Kim Sozzi
9. "Takin' Over"
  Music & Lyrics: Klas Wahl / Roger Olsson / Axel Hedfors / George Nakas / Liz Winstanley. Published by: Universal Music Publishing AB / Universal Music Publishing Ltd. Produced by Albert Castillo and Rich "DJ Riddler" Pangilinan for Al B. Rich Music Group.
  Vocal Performance by Marisol Angelique Solorzano
10. "Send Me an Angel"
  Music & Lyrics: Anders Henjer. Published by: Universal Music Publishing AB) Produced by Albert Castillo and Rich "DJ Riddler" Pangilinan for Al B. Rich Music Group.
  Vocal Performance by Kim Sozzi
11. "Stay" [Valentin Remix]
  Additional production by Valentin for Valkrys Enterprises, Inc.
12. "Still Not Sorry" [Mr Sam Radio Remix]
  Additional production byExecutive Producers: Patrick Moxey, Rich Pangilinan
  A&R Direction: David Waxman, Rich Pangilinan, Mark Davenport
  Vocal Producer: Ray Balconis for Studio Ray
  Management: Track One Media

== Chart performance ==
"How Did You Know?"

U.S. Billboard Hot 100
97
