= 2000 Soul Train Lady of Soul Awards =

American awards show

Soul Train Lady of Soul Awards
- Date: September 2, 2000
- Location: Santa Monica Civic Auditorium, Santa Monica, California
- Country: United States

Highlights
- Most awards: Mary J. Blige (2), Destiny's Child (2), Angie Stone (2)

The 2000 Soul Train Lady of Soul Awards were held on September 2, 2000 at the Santa Monica Civic Auditorium in Santa Monica, California. The sixth annual awards program was hosted by singers Sisqó and Pink, and actor Shemar Moore. Destiny's Child, Mary J. Blige, and Angie Stone each took home two trophies.

== Special awards ==
=== Aretha Franklin Award for Entertainer of the Year ===
- Toni Braxton

=== Lena Horne Award for Outstanding Career Achievement ===
- Halle Berry

== Winners and nominees ==
Winners are in bold text.

=== Best R&B/Soul Single – Solo ===
- **Angie Stone – "No More Rain (In This Cloud)"**
  - Aaliyah – "Try Again"
  - Mary J. Blige – "All That I Can Say"
  - Lauryn Hill – "Everything Is Everything"

=== Best R&B/Soul Single – Group, Band or Duo ===
- **Destiny's Child – "Say My Name"**
  - Jazzyfatnastees – "The Wound"
  - Mary Mary – "Shackles (Praise You)"
  - TLC – "Unpretty"

=== R&B/Soul Album of the Year – Solo ===
- **Mary J. Blige – Mary**
  - Yolanda Adams – Mountain High... Valley Low
  - Eve – Let There Be Eve...Ruff Ryders' First Lady
  - Amel Larrieux – Infinite Possibilities

=== R&B/Soul Album of the Year – Group, Band or Duo ===
- **Destiny's Child – The Writing's on the Wall**
  - 702 – 702
  - Blaque – Blaque
  - Trin-I-Tee 5:7 – Spiritual Love

=== Best R&B/Soul or Rap New Artist – Solo ===
- **Angie Stone – "No More Rain (In This Cloud)"**
  - Eve – "Gotta Man"
  - Macy Gray – "Do Something"
  - Jennifer Lopez – "If You Had My Love"

=== Best R&B/Soul or Rap New Artist – Group, Band or Duo ===
- **Mary Mary – "Shackles (Praise You)"**
  - F.A.T.E. – "Just Because"
  - Jazzyfatnastees – "The Wound"
  - So Plush – "Damn (Should've Treated U Right)"

=== R&B/Soul or Rap Song of the Year ===
- **Mary J. Blige – "All That I Can Say"**
  - Destiny's Child – "Say My Name"
  - Missy "Misdemeanor" Elliott – "Hot Boyz"
  - TLC – "Unpretty"

=== Best R&B/Soul or Rap Music Video ===
- **Missy "Misdemeanor" Elliott – "Hot Boyz"**
  - Aaliyah – "Try Again"
  - Da Brat – "That's What I'm Looking for"
  - Eve – "Love Is Blind"

=== Best Gospel Album ===
- **Yolanda Adams – Mountain High... Valley Low**
  - Karen Clark-Sheard – Finally Karen
  - Trin-I-Tee 5:7 – Spiritual Love
  - CeCe Winans – Alabaster Box
