= All That I Can Say =

Single by Mary J. Blige

from the album Mary
- B-side: "Beautiful"
- Released: June 30, 1999
- Length: 5:30 (album version); 3:59 (radio edit)
- Label: MCA
- Songwriter: Lauryn Hill
- Producer: Lauryn Hill

Mary J. Blige singles chronology
"As" (1999)	"All That I Can Say" (1999)	"Deep Inside" (1999)

Music video
- "All That I Can Say" on YouTube

"All That I Can Say" is a song by American recording artist Mary J. Blige. It was composed by fellow R&B singer Lauryn Hill, who also sang backing vocals, for Blige's fourth studio album, Mary (1999). Released as the album's lead single in June 1999 by MCA Records, it became a moderate commercial success in both the United States and United Kingdom, peaking at numbers forty-four and twenty-nine, respectively, while becoming a top ten hit on the R&B chart. The accompanying music video was directed by Noble Jones.

Blige performed the song live on the first incarnation of The Queen Latifah Show in September 1999, which featured an impromptu appearance by Hill who performed an original rap verse. She also performed the song on Top of the Pops. The song won R&B/Soul or Rap Song of the Year at the 2000 Soul Train Lady of Soul Awards. At the 42nd Grammy Awards, "All That I Can Say" earned Blige her sixth Grammy Award nomination for Best Female R&B Vocal Performance, while Hill was nominated for Best R&B Song for her contributions.

== Background ==
"All That I Can Say" was written by singer Lauryn Hill and originally intended to be recorded by Whitney Houston for her fourth studio album My Love Is Your Love (1998). Due to timing issues, Houston was unable to record her vocals and the song was instead given to Mary J. Blige, who had started work on self-titled next album, while Hill eventually produced a rendition of Stevie Wonder's "I Was Made to Love Her" for Houston's album. Blige found that "All That I Can Say" marked a rare occasion for her to enjoy a sisterly experience with someone other than her two blood sisters, telling Rap Pages in 1999: "She's a perfect example of how to just bond with your women. It's rare in the business, because there are a lot of women that I refuse to work with."

== Critical reception ==
Larry Flick from Billboard magazine wrote that the song "demonstrates yet another formidable step forward in the career path of this fly girl gone sophisticate." He noted that Blige is "in good hands with this dreamy, '70s-based jazz/funk smash", and that she is "sounding as sharp as cut glass, with a smattering of scatting and just enough grit to define the artist's signature edge in this classy number." He also described the track as "spirited, joyful, retro, and yet right on the edge, sounding like nothing she's delivered before". The Daily Vault's Mark Millan stated that "All That I Can Say" "gets things off to a good start, and Blige's voice has never sounded as softly sweet as it is here". Stacey A. Rather from Lincolnian said the song has a "pop sound that is very prevalent in music right now."

Stevie Chick from NME called it a "perfect, loving pastiche of Wonder's Moog-powered balladry." He added, "It is, tellingly, written, arranged and produced by Lauryn herself. Standing head and shoulders above the rest of the LP, it almost cruelly reveals the distance between Hill, and this pretender to her throne." Another editor, John Robinson, wrote, "'All That I Can Say' is glorious, as if straight out of the '70s soul/funk golden age. Those searching synths could've been stripped straight from Stevie Wonder's Fulfillingness' First Finale album, that melody embodies not a little of Al Green's sexy, laid-back magic. And Mary J's vocals eschew the modern, octave-skipping histrionics of Mariah et al, in favour of a more reserved delivery, building up to an angelic crescendo on the run-out groove that may be the most perfect 30 seconds or so of music recorded this year." "'All That I Can Say' is also as sublime a listening experience as you're likely to hear all year, written, produced, performed to perfection, and guaranteed to coat you head to toe in goose pimples in under four minutes flat. Shameless, yeah. But as in shamelessly good."

== Chart performance ==
In the United States, "All That I Can Say" was delivered to radio on June 30, 1999. Though the song was not released commercially, it peaked at number 44 on the Billboard Hot 100 and number six on the Hot R&B Singles & Tracks chart.

== Music video ==
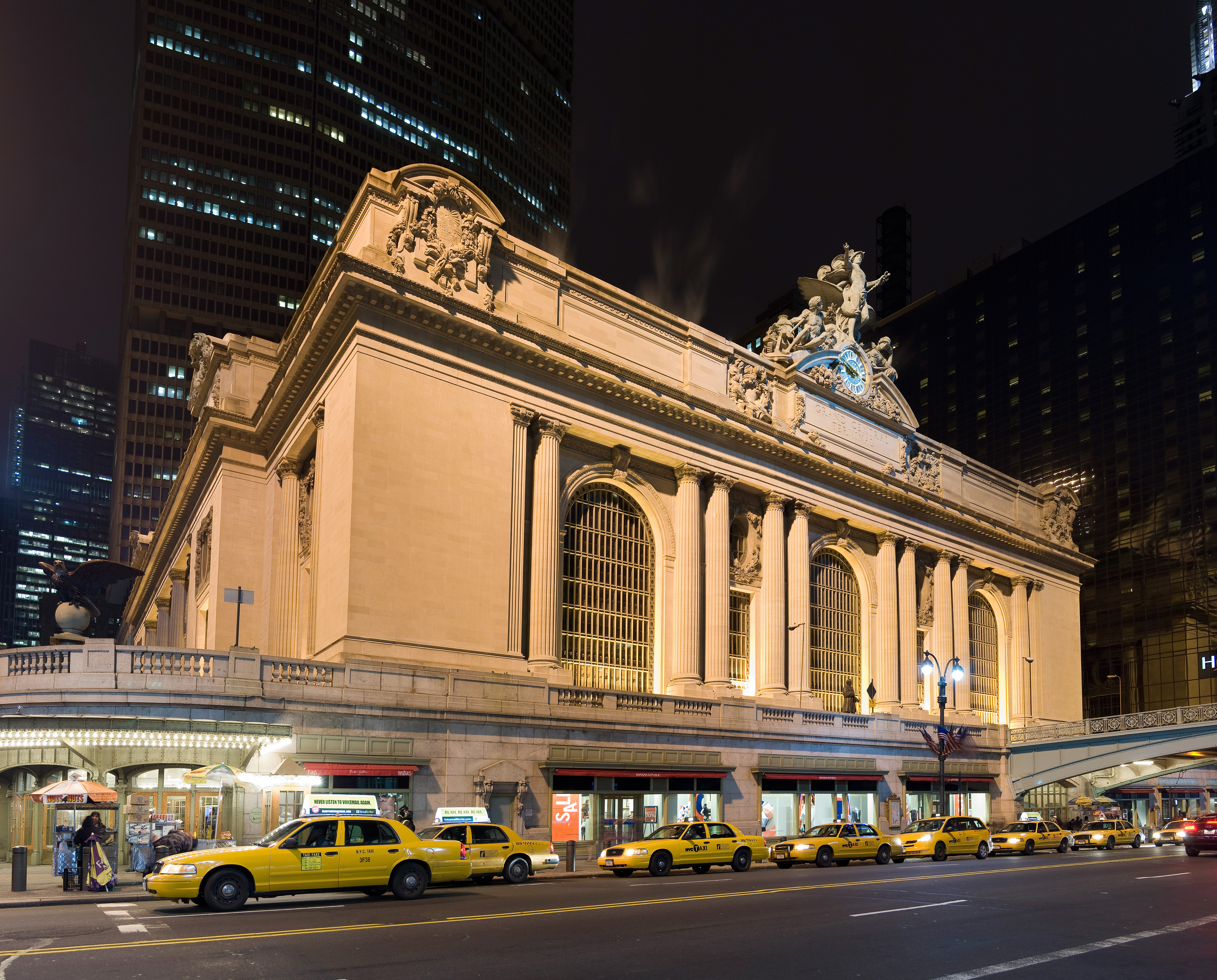
Grand Central Station served as one of the settings for the music video

A music video for "All That I Can Say" was directed by Noble Jones and produced by Toronto-based Revolver Film Company. Filmed in New York City in July 1999. it features Bluge in a surreal dream sequence. Canada-based visual effects company TOPIX/Mad Dog completed the visual effects in the video which integrates live-action, timelapse photography, stock footage, and 3D clouds. Softimage artist Sean Montgomery was consulted to create and animate orbs, while TOPIX/Mad Dog composited Blige into scenes featuring Times Square, a white horse running through the streets, and a waterfall at the end of a street. Critics called "All That I Can Say" a "palpable departure from her previous video treatments."

The video opens with Blige asleep as a white horse runs through the city. At 9:00 a.m., her alarm wakes her, and she starts singing before gazing out at the clouds. She then walks through a confetti-filled street near Grand Central Station, where billboards flash her image and the message, "New York Loves You Mary…". Red bubbles appear, each showing her in a different outfit. Later, she ascends a massive escalator into the sky and walks on clouds toward a naked man in the distance. Just as they’re about to meet, the alarm rings again. Blige wakes up, puzzled, and looks out at the clouds as the video ends. "All That I Can Say" was later made available on Blige's official YouTube channel in 2009, and had generated almost five million views as of November 2023.

== Track listings ==
UK CD single

No.	Title	Writer(s)	Producer(s)	Length
1.	"All That I Can Say" (Radio Edit)	Lauryn Hill	Hill	3:39
2.	"Beautiful" (Blackstar Remix featuring Mos Def and Talib Kweli)	James Harris III; Terry Lewis; Mary J. Blige; Dante Terrell Smith; Talb Greene	Jimmy Jam and Terry Lewis; Hi-Tek^{[A]}
3.	"All That I Can Say" (Album Version)	Hill	Hill	5:30

Notes

- ^{^[A]} denotes additional producer

== Charts ==
=== Weekly charts ===
Weekly chart performance for "All That I Can Say"
Chart (1999)	Peak position
Europe (Eurochart Hot 100)	81
Netherlands (Dutch Top 40 Tipparade)	20
Netherlands (Single Top 100)	91
Scotland (OCC)	52
UK Singles (Official Charts)	29
UK Dance (OCC)	14
UK R&B (OCC)	5
US Billboard Hot 100	44
US Hot R&B/Hip-Hop Songs (Billboard)	6

=== Year-end charts ===
Year-end chart performance for "All That I Can Say"
Chart (1999)	Position
UK Urban (Music Week)	15
US Hot R&B/Hip-Hop Songs (Billboard)	48

== Release history ==
List of releases of "All That I Can Say"
Region	Date	Format(s)	Label	Ref.
United States	June 30, 1999	Radio	MCA	
United Kingdom	August 9, 1999	12-inch vinyl; CD; cassette	MCA	

== Cover versions ==
In 2000, French pianist Alex Bugnon covered the song from his album As Promised, which featured a guest vocals from Blige's then-current labelmate Christopher Williams. In 2011, jazz vocalist Gretchen Parlato covered the song on her album The Lost and Found.
