= 5 O'Clock (Nonchalant song) =

Single by Nonchalant

from the album Until the Day
- Released: February 6, 1996
- Recorded: 1995
- Genre: Hip hop
- Length: 4:45
- Label: MCA
- Songwriter(s): Tanya Pointer
- Producer(s): DeWayne "Bam" Staten, Sr., Alonzo "Lonnie" Simmons, Jr., and Kapin L. Ferguson, Jr.

Nonchalant singles chronology
"5 O'Clock" (1996)	"Until the Day" (1996)

"5 O'Clock" is the lead single released from Nonchalant's debut album, Until the Day.

== Background ==
Produced by DeWayne "Bam" Staten, Sr., Kapin L. Ferguson, Jr., and Alonzo "Lonnie" Simmons, Jr. of B.L.A.K. (Bam, Lonnie, and Kapin) Productions (with additional remixes produced by K-Def and B.L.A.K. Productions),Starrstrukk "On The Mark productions "5 O'Clock" was released in early 1996 and eventually reached number 24 on the Billboard Hot 100 and number 8 on the Hot R&B/Hip-Hop Songs, spending 20 weeks on each chart, while also topping the Hot Rap Singles at number one. The single also earned a gold certification from the Recording Industry Association of America for sales of 500,000 copies. Despite the success of "5 O'clock", neither her album Until the Day nor the follow-up single also titled "Until the Day" were able to achieve much success and to date she has yet to release another album.

== Single track listing ==
1. "5 O'Clock" (K-Def Remix)- 4:25
2. "5 O'Clock" (B.L.A.K. Productions Remix)- 5:06
3. "5 O'Clock" (Dusk 'til Dawn Remix)- 4:47
4. "5 O'Clock" (DJ Heart Attack Remix)- 4:54
5. "5 O'Clock" (StarrStrukk hot mix)-4:00
6. "5 O'Clock" (LP Version)- 4:45

== Charts ==
Chart (1996)	Peak position
Billboard Hot 100	24
Billboard Hot R&B/Hip-Hop Singles & Tracks	8
Billboard Hot Rap Singles	1
Billboard Rhythmic Top 40	33
Billboard Hot Dance Music/Maxi-Singles Sales	5
