= Your Child =

2000 single by Mary J. Blige

Single by Mary J. Blige

from the album Mary
- Released: June 5, 2000
- Length: 5:34
- Label: MCA
- Songwriter: Gerald Isaac
- Producer: Gerald Isaac

Mary J. Blige singles chronology
"Give Me You" (2000)	"Your Child" (2000)	"911" (2000)

"Your Child" is a song by American singer Mary J. Blige. It was written and produced by Gerald Isaac for Blige's fourth studio album, Mary (1999). The song was released by MCA Records as the album's fourth and final single on June 5, 2000, in the United States. It peaked at number one on the US Billboard Dance Club Play chart and reached number 23 on the Billboard Hot R&B/Hip-Hop Singles & Tracks chart. The accompanying music video for "Your Child" featured Blige performing alongside Harvey White, Joyce Washington, Billie Woodruff and actor Leon Robinson.

== Charts ==
=== Weekly charts ===
Chart (2000)	Peak position
US Bubbling Under Hot 100 (Billboard)	6
US Dance Club Songs (Billboard)	1
US Hot R&B/Hip-Hop Songs (Billboard)	23

=== Year-end charts ===
Chart (2000)	Position
US Hot R&B/Hip-Hop Singles & Tracks (Billboard)	46
