= Mynt =

- Genres: Electronica, dance-pop
- Years active: 2004–present
- Labels: Ultra Records
- Members: Marisol Angelique; Joe Murena; Rich "DJ Riddler" Pangilinan; Albert Castillo
- Past members: Kim Sozzi
- Website: Official website

Mynt is a dance music act from New York City. The co-ed quintet is made up of DJ/producer/remixers Albert Castillo and Rich "DJ Riddler" Pangilinan, male vocalist Joseph Murena, and female vocalists Marisol Angelique-Solorzano and Kim Sozzi.

== Career ==
=== Beginnings ===
Prior to forming the act, Castillo had done club mixes and productions, Rich Pangilinan was also a remixer and DJ for radio station, WKTU, Sozzi had two hits on the Hot Dance Music/Club Play chart, "Feelin' Me"(#4/2001) and "We Get Together"(Credited as HQ2/Hex Hextor Presents Kim Sozzi, #18/2002), Angelique-Solorzano did background vocal work and Murena was a semi-finalist on American Idol.

=== Not another "Faceless/Production" act ===
While some dance pundits think that this might be just another "faceless DJ/production" act, the members dispel that theory, saying that they were inspired by early 1990s acts such as Deee-lite and C&C Music Factory and they want to share, in their own words, "unique blend of the American Club culture with an alternative rock twist". All the members of the band (before Kim Sozzi's departure) are prominently featured on the album's sleeve.m

== Discography ==
=== Albums ===
- 2005 – "Still Not Sorry" Ultra Records

=== Singles ===
- How Did You Know June 1, 2004
- Stay (Kim Sozzi single) March 8, 2005
- Back in Love August 9, 2005
- Still Not Sorry October 11, 2005
- You're the Only One April 11, 2006

== Chart history ==
In 2004 the act transformed a cover of Kurtis Mantronik's "How Did You Know" into a number three smash hit single on the Billboard Dance/Mix Show Airplay chart that stayed on the charts for months. The song achieved some crossover success on the Billboard Hot 100 chart peaking at #97. It was later followed by "Stay" (an original composition), which went top 5 on the Dance/Mix Show Airplay chart in 2005. Both tracks were credited as "MYNT Featuring Kim Sozzi". In October 2005, they released their first full-length CD (Still Not Sorry) and their third single "Still Not Sorry", with Angelique-Solorzano on vocals.
