= Give Me You (Mary J. Blige song) =

2000 single by Mary J. Blige

Single by Mary J. Blige

from the album Mary
- Released: February 28, 2000
- Length: 5:34 (US album version); 4:10 (UK single mix)
- Label: MCA
- Songwriter: Diane Warren
- Producers: Manuel Seal; Nate-Love Clemons

Mary J. Blige singles chronology
"Deep Inside" (1999)	"Give Me You" (2000)	"Your Child" (2000)

"Give Me You" is a song by American singer Mary J. Blige. It was written by Diane Warren for Blige's fourth studio album, Mary (1999), while production was helmed by Manuel Seal, featuring co-production from Nate-Love Clemons. The song was released as the third single from the album on February 28, 2000. "Give Me You" peaked at number 19 on the UK Singles Chart while reaching number 21 on the US Hot R&B/Hip-Hop Singles & Tracks chart and number 68 on the Billboard Hot 100.

In the UK, the Niño remix was the main radio version. The Mary album was then re-released there with the Niño remix added to the track listing. NBA legend Michael Jordan makes a cameo in the music video.

== Track listings ==
US CD single

1. "Give Me You" (LP version) – 5:03
2. "Give Me You" (Niño Remix) – 6:40

UK cassette single

1. "Give Me You" (Niño Radio Mix) – 3:34
2. "Give Me You" (LP version) – 5:03

UK CD 1

1. "Give Me You" (Niño Radio Mix) – 3:34
2. "Give Me You" (Extended Niño Mix) – 6:39
3. "Give Me You" (Club Path) – 5:52
4. "Give Me You" (Royal Garden R&B Mix) – 3:42

UK CD 2

1. "Give Me You" (Single Mix with Orchestral Intro) – 4:10
2. "Give Me You" (Royal Garden's Discotip Extended) – 7:02
3. "Sexy" (featuring Jadakiss) – 4:47

== Personnel ==
Personnel are adapted from the Mary liner notes.

- Mary J. Blige – vocals
- Eric Clapton – lead guitar
- Michael Clemons – drums
- Nate-Love Clemons – bass synthesizer, co-production
- Paul Pesco – additional guitars
- Paul Riser – string arrangements
- Manuel Seal – acoustic piano, electric piano, production
- Diane Warren – songwriting

== Charts ==
=== Weekly charts ===
Weekly chart performance for "Give Me You"
Chart (1999–2000)	Peak position
Australia (ARIA)	58
Europe (Eurochart Hot 100)	64
European Radio Top 50 (Music & Media)	32
Germany (GfK)	76
Ireland (IRMA)	45
Italy Airplay (Music & Media)	9
Netherlands (Single Top 100)	77
Scottish Singles Sales (Official Charts)	24
Switzerland (Schweizer Hitparade)	64
UK Singles (Official Charts)	19
UK Hip Hop/R&B (Official Charts)	9
US Billboard Hot 100	68
US Hot R&B/Hip-Hop Songs (Billboard)	21

=== Year-end charts ===
Year-end chart performance for "Give Me You"
Chart (2000)	Position
UK Urban (Music Week)	36

== Release history ==
Release history and formats for "Give Me You"
Region	Date	Format(s)	Label(s)	Ref.
United States	February 28, 2000	Urban radio	MCA	
United States	February 29, 2000	Rhythmic contemporary; urban adult contemporary radio	MCA	
Japan	April 5, 2000	CD	MCA	
United States	April 10, 2000	Contemporary hit radio	MCA	
