= Soul Train Lady of Soul Awards =

American award show

- Awarded for: Outstanding achievements of female artists in the music entertainment industry
- Country: United States
- Presented by: Soul Train Music Awards
- First award: August 6, 1995; 31 years ago
- Final award: August 6, 2005; 21 years ago

The Soul Train Lady of Soul Awards were an American award show that was established in 1995 by the Soul Train Music Awards to honor the achievements of female recording artists. Produced by Don Cornelius Productions and presented annually, the annual presentation ceremony featured performances by artists; ost shows were presented in a televised ceremony.

== Ceremonies ==
#	Date	Host	Venue
01	1995	Tyra Banks, Brian McKnight and Gladys Knight	Santa Monica Civic Auditorium, Santa Monica, California
02	1996	Queen Latifah, Peabo Bryson and Veronica Webb	Santa Monica Civic Auditorium, Santa Monica, California
03	1997	Chaka Khan, Bill Bellamy and Erykah Badu	Santa Monica Civic Auditorium, Santa Monica, California
04	1998	Brandy, LL Cool J and Brian McKnight	Santa Monica Civic Auditorium, Santa Monica, California
05	1999	Shemar Moore, Deborah Cox, Monica and Busta Rhymes	Santa Monica Civic Auditorium, Santa Monica, California
06	2000	Shemar Moore, Sisqó and Pink	Santa Monica Civic Auditorium, Santa Monica, California
07	2001	Shemar Moore, Luther Vandross, Leeza Gibbons and Eve	Santa Monica Civic Auditorium, Santa Monica, California
08	2002	Shemar Moore, Arsenio Hall and Jill Scott	Pasadena Convention Center, Pasadena, California
09	2003	Arsenio Hall, Aisha Tyler, Heather Headley and Tyrese	Pasadena Convention Center, Pasadena, California
10	2005	Ciara, Toni Braxton and Brian McKnight	Pasadena Convention Center, Pasadena, California

== See also ==
- Soul Train Music Awards
