= Nonchalant =

American rapper

- Born: Tanya Pointer
- Origin: Washington, D.C., United States
- Genre: Hip hop
- Occupations: DJ; Rapper
- Years active: 1986–2001, 2012–present
- Label: MCA

Tanya Pointer, also known as Nonchalant is an American rapper and songwriter from Washington, D.C. who was signed to MCA Records.

Nonchalant is best known for her hit single "5 O'Clock", which peaked at number 24 on the US Billboard Hot 100 and was eventually certified gold by the RIAA, for sales of over 500,000 copies. It peaked at number 44 in the UK Singles Chart in June 1996. Her debut album, Until the Day, was released on March 26, 1996, and while it received positive reviews, it failed to match the success of its lead single, reaching number 94 on the US Billboard 200. After her album ran its course, Nonchalant appeared on the song "Keep on Pushin'" from the Dangerous Ground soundtrack alongside fellow rappers MC Lyte, Yo-Yo and Bahamadia. She released a single entitled "Take It There" in 1998, but after it failed to catch on, she was dropped from MCA. Her last appearance was on the Half Baked soundtrack on the song entitled "Flyin'". She largely disappeared from the hip hop circuit by 2001, but returned in 2013 as a DJ.

== Discography ==
=== Albums ===
Year	Title	Chart positions	
Year	Title	US	US R&B
1996	Until the Day: Released: March 26, 1996; Label: MCA	94	20
2021	For All Non-Believers: Released: September 3, 2021; Label: Aralc Entertainment	-	-

=== Singles ===
Year	Single	Chart positions			Album
Year	Single	US Hot 100	US R&B	US Rap	Album
1996	"5 O'Clock"	24	8	1	Until the Day
1996	"Until the Day"	–	88	25	Until the Day
