= Dis-n-Dat =

American hip hop group

- Origin: Miami, Florida, U.S.
- Genres: Hip hop, Miami bass
- Years active: 1993–1995
- Label: Epic Street
- Members: Tishea "Dis" Bennett; Tenesia "Dat" Bennett

Dis-n-Dat was an American Miami bass hip hop duo consisting of sisters Tishea and Tenesia Bennett. They recorded for Epic Records.

Closely associated with popular Miami bass acts, the 69 Boyz and Quad City DJ's, Dis-n-Dat released their debut album, Bumpin' on October 11, 1994, with Quad City DJs and 69 Boyz members CC Lemonhead and Jay Ski producing the entire album. The album produced two semi-successful singles—"Freak Me, Baby" and "Party"—the latter of which appeared on ESPN's double-platinum Jock Jams, Volume 2. In 1995, the album was nominated for Best Rap Album at Soul Train's Lady of Soul Awards.

== Discography ==
=== Album ===
Year	Title	Chart positions	
Year	Title	U.S. R&B	U.S. Heat
1994	Bumpin': Released: October 11, 1994; Label: Epic Street	53	24

=== Singles ===
Year	Single	Chart positions			Album
Year	Single	U.S. Hot 100	U.S. R&B	U.S. Rap	Album
1994	"Party"	102	59	11	Bumpin'
1995	"Freak Me, Baby"	60	38	6	Bumpin'
