= The Jock Jam =

Mashup song released in 1997

Single by ESPN

from the album Jock Jams, Volume 3
- Released: September 1997
- Genre: Novelty
- Length: 3:08
- Label: Tommy Boy Records
- Producers: Rich "DJ Riddler" Pangilinan, Bobby Dedic

"The Jock Jam" (released as a single by the name "ESPN Presents the Jock Jam") is a mash-up song from the compilation album Jock Jams, Volume 3.

The single was released in late September 1997 on Tommy Boy Records. It consists of samples of songs and phrases from popular dance, eurodance and rap recordings, either sport-themed or not, that were released on previous volumes of the Jock Jams compilation series. It appeared on Jock Jams volume 3, even though most of the songs contained in this mix were released on the two previous volumes. Those are mixed in a three-minute megamix fashion, mixed and produced by Rich "DJ Riddler" Pangilinan and Bobby Dedic.

This song received significant radio airplay when it was released, notably in United States and Canada, which is a rare feat for a dance mash-up. The song peaked at 31 on the Billboard hot 100 and was certified gold by the RIAA on October 22, 1997 for sales of 500,000 copies.

A second mash-up named "Son of Jock Jam (Mega Mix)" was released on Jock Jams, Volume 4. That album also includes a mash-up of songs by 2 Unlimited named "Unlimited Megajam".

== Samples used ==
Many songs and samples were used in the making of this recording. In order of appearance:

- Michael Buffer - "Let's get ready to rumble!" (quote)
- 2 Unlimited - "Get Ready for This"
- Tag Team - "Whoomp! (There It Is)"
- Technotronic - "Pump Up the Jam"
- Amber - "This Is Your Night"
- Faith No More - "Be Aggressive"
- Rob Base and DJ E-Z Rock - "It Takes Two"
- Reel 2 Real - "I Like to Move It"
- The Goodmen - "Give It Up"
- The Outhere Brothers - "Boom Boom Boom"
- Dan Patrick - "Simply en fuego." (quote)
- Keith Olbermann - "Welcome to the big show." (quote)
- 69 Boyz - "Tootsee Roll"
- 2 Unlimited - "Twilight Zone"
- The Bucketheads - "The Bomb! (These Sounds Fall into My Mind)"
- Black Box - "Strike It Up"
- Jock Jam Cheerleaders - "Action, Boys, Action"
- Gary Glitter - "Rock and Roll (Part 2)"
- Chris Berman - "He could. go. all. the. way!" (quote)
- Jock Jam Cheerleaders - "Hey, Hey You!"
- Village People - "Y.M.C.A."
- Black Box - "Everybody Everybody"
- C+C Music Factory - "Gonna Make You Sweat (Everybody Dance Now)"

== Chart performance ==
=== Peak positions ===
Chart (1997)	Peak position
US Billboard Hot 100	31

=== Year-end charts ===
Chart (1997)	Position
U.S. Billboard Hot 100	72
