= Mary (Mary J. Blige album) =

Studio album by Mary J. Blige
- Released: August 17, 1999
- Recorded: 1998–1999
- Length: 73:01
- Label: MCA
- Producers: Mary J. Blige; Babyface; Nate-Love Clemons; Bryant Crockett; Kevin Deane; Kiyamma Griffin; Funkmaster Flex; Rich Harrison; Lalah Hathaway; Lauryn Hill; Dean Hostler; Floyd Howard; Gerald Isaac; Jimmy Jam & Terry Lewis; K-Smoove; Moise LaPorte; Ike Lee; Malik Pendleton; Manuel Seal; Soulshock & Karlin; Chucky Thompson

Mary J. Blige chronology
The Tour (1998)	Mary (1999)	No More Drama (2001)

Singles from Mary
- 1. "As" Released: March 1, 1999; 2. "All That I Can Say" Released: July 9, 1999; 3. "Deep Inside" Released: September 28, 1999; 4. "Give Me You" Released: March 23, 2000; 5. "Your Child" Released: May 29, 2000

Mary is the fourth studio album by American singer Mary J. Blige, released August 17, 1999, on MCA Records. The album debuted at number two on the Billboard 200 chart, selling 239,000 copies in its first week. It spent 57 weeks on the chart and produced five charting singles. Upon its release, Mary received acclaim from music critics. It has been certified double platinum by the Recording Industry Association of America for sales of two million units in the United States.

== Background ==
According to critic Stephen Thomas Erlewine, the album showcases a creative move by Blige from urban contemporary to adult contemporary, eschewing her previous work's overt hip hop elements for classicist soul music and more mature songwriting. Highlighted by sleek and polished production reminiscent of 1970s soul, Mary came as a surprise to many of her fans and critics. Similar to Blige's previous release Share My World, the singer served as executive producer. Blige worked with various artists on the album including Aretha Franklin, Lauryn Hill, Jadakiss, Eric Clapton, Elton John, K-Ci, and George Michael. "I'm in Love", "As" and "Let No Man Put Asunder" are cover versions of songs originally performed by The Gap Band, Stevie Wonder, and First Choice respectively.

== Release and promotion ==
Blige performed "No Happy Holidays" on Motown Live and VH1 in December 1998. According to the album's executive producer Kirk Burrowes, she and MCA decided not to go forward with pushing the song as the first single.

The album was released in the United States on August 17, 1999, and in the United Kingdom on October 1, 1999.

"All That I Can Say," "Deep Inside," "Your Child," and "Give Me You" were the album's commercial singles in the United States. "As"—Blige's collaboration with George Michael—was released as the lead single everywhere else worldwide. Three singles from the album charted on the Billboard Hot 100: "All That I Can Say" at number 44, "Deep Inside" at number 51, and "Give Me You" at number 68. All four United States singles charted on the Billboard Hot R&B/Hip-Hop Singles & Tracks: "All That I Can Say" at number six, "Deep Inside" at number nine, "Your Child" at number 23, and "Give Me You" at number 21.

== Critical reception ==
Professional ratings
Review scores
Source	Rating
AllMusic	4/5 stars
Encyclopedia of Popular Music	4/5 stars
Entertainment Weekly	B+
Los Angeles Times	3/4 stars
NME	6/10
Q	4/5 stars
Rolling Stone	4/5 stars
Spin	9/10
USA Today	3.5/4 stars
The Village Voice	A−

Mary was met with universal acclaim from critics. Q wrote, "Blige can turn from sassy to agonized to vulnerable in the space of a single phrase [...] The Queen Of Hip Hop Soul remains classy and invincible". Craig Seymour of Spin praised its classicist influences and called Mary "emotionally gripping and stylistically diverse", writing that "[Blige's] assured blues moans, gospel shouts, and jazzy inflections graph the history of African-American music". Chicago Tribune writer Greg Kot noted "a more organic feel" in its production, which he viewed as less "uninspired" than on Blige's previous albums. Entertainment Weekly's Anthony DeCurtis complimented Blige's vocal embellishments and the album's "lush and spare" arrangements, stating "Musically, Mary is essentially a long, soulful, ballad-tempo vamp over which Blige alternately — and sometimes simultaneously — tells tales of faithless love, preaches the gospel of female strength, and determinedly clings to hope". The Source complimented Blige's "pure emotion" and stated "she dares to break the hip-hop soul template she helped create, and do something different. Something our loop-weary souls need". Steve Jones of USA Today commended Blige for "making you feel rather than merely hear what she's singing about", adding that she "continues to separate herself from her peers, conveying a wide range of emotions without becoming whiny, petty or overwrought".

Despite viewing its strength as "more in how Blige sings the songs than the songs themselves", Los Angeles Times writer Soren Baker commented that "the lively, supple instrumentation only adds to the force of her already dominating delivery" and noted "a more soul-stirring, straightforward R&B attitude than the hip-hop/R&B hybrid of her earlier collections". Rolling Stone writer Touré said "Blige seems to have moved away from the Terry McMillan once-again-he's-breaking-my-heart mantra to, perhaps, an Oprah love-your-spirit ethos". Christopher John Farley of Time wrote that "Mary is somewhat inconsistent in song quality, but Blige's soul-singed vocals save the weaker material". Ann Powers of The New York Times viewed that the album exemplifies a "new conscience" of feminine themes in contemporary R&B at the time, adding that "if Mary gestures toward an older, non-hip-hop audience, it also makes the claim for Ms. Blige's canonization within the rhythm-and-blues hall of fame". In his consumer guide for The Village Voice, critic Robert Christgau wrote, "Rather than hating playas, she's bored with them [...] all that she can say is that she's ready to love someone serious and walk away from anyone who isn't".

In a retrospective review for The Rolling Stone Album Guide, Tom Moon deemed Mary an improvement over Blige's previous album, commenting that it "more fully realizes Blige's vision for Share My World". AllMusic editor Stephen Thomas Erlewine praised its "sheer classiness", writing that "There's still grit in the music, but it's been glossed over with a polished production". Erlewine described it as "a rewarding, engaging way to mature" and wrote that "Blige's voice is richer and her skills have deepened, and her new songs, while not as streetwise, are worthy of her talents".

== Accolades ==
Spin ranked the album number 15 in its year-end list of best albums. Blige won and was nominated for many awards for this album.

- She was nominated for 2 MTV Europe Music Awards for Best Video and Best Song ("As" with George Michael).
- In 2000 Blige was nominated for a Brit Award for Best International Female Solo Artist.
- 3 Grammy Awards nominations for Best R&B Vocal Performance - Female ("All That I Can Say"), Best R&B Vocal Performance by a Duo or Group ("Don't Waste Your Time" with Aretha Franklin), and Best R&B Album (Mary).
- In 2001 Blige was nominated for a Soul Train Music Award for Best Female R&B/Soul Single for "Your Child".
- Blige won a Soul Train Music Award for Best R&B/Soul Album, Female (Mary) and was also nominated for Best R&B/Soul or Rap Album.
- Blige also won 2 Soul Train Lady of Soul Awards for Solo R&B/Soul Album of the Year for Mary and R&B/Soul or Rap Song of the Year for "All That I Can Say". She was also nominated for Best Solo R&B/Soul Single for "All That I Can Say".
- Blige also won the first ever BET award for Best Female Artist in 2001 for Deep Inside.

== Commercial performance ==
Mary debuted at number two on the US Billboard 200 chart, with first-week sales of 239,000 copies in the United States. It also entered at number one on Billboard's Top R&B/Hip-Hop Albums chart, becoming Blige's fourth album to top the chart. Mary spent 57 weeks on the Billboard 200 and 69 weeks on the Billboard Top R&B/Hip-Hop Albums. Billboard ranked it 20th and 17th on its 1999 and 2000 Top R&B/Hip-Hop Albums year-end chart, respectively. On October 18, 2000, the album was certified double platinum by the Recording Industry Association of America (RIAA) for shipments of two million copies in the United States. By December 2009, Mary had sold 2,100,000 copies in the United States.

In the United Kingdom, Mary marked Blige's highest-charting album yet, debuting at number five on the UK Albums Chart. As steady seller, it was certified Silver by the British Phonographic Industry (BPI) on April 24, 2000, and reached Gold status on July 22, 13, indicating shipments of 100,000 copies in the United Kingdom. In Canada, the album peaked at number nine on both RPM's Canada Top Albums/CDs and the Canadian R&B Albums chart. On August 23, 1999, it was certified Gold by Music Canada for shipments of 40,000 copies. Elsewhere, Mary became Blige's first top ten album in Sweden and first top 20 entry in Japan, Norway, Switzerland, and the Netherlands.

== Track listing ==
North American track listing
No.	Title	Writer(s)	Producer(s)	Length
1.	"All That I Can Say"	Lauryn Hill	Lauryn Hill	5:30
2.	"Sexy" (featuring Jadakiss)	Mary J. Blige; Jason Phillips; Stevie Wonder; Susaye Greene	Floyd Howard; Kiyamma Griffin	4:47
3.	"Deep Inside"	Blige; Tara Geter; Kevin Deane; Elton John; Bernie Taupin	Deane	5:26
4.	"Beautiful Ones"	Rich Harrison; Cecil Ward; Burt Bacharach; Hal David	Harrison; Chucky Thompson	5:59
5.	"I'm in Love"	Ronnie Wilson; Lonnie Wilson	Blige	4:50
6.	"Time"	Blige; Thompson; Wonder	Blige; Thompson	5:06
7.	"Memories"	Carsten Schack; Kenneth Karlin; Chanette Higgens; Channoah Higgens; Blige	Soulshock and Karlin	4:38
8.	"Don't Waste Your Time" (duet with Aretha Franklin)	Gen Rubin; Denise Rich	Babyface	4:12
9.	"Not Lookin'" (duet with K-Ci Hailey of Jodeci)	Blige; Jean Morris; Dean Hostler; Ike Lee	Lee; Hostler	5:27
10.	"Your Child"	Gerald Isaac	Isaac	5:36
11.	"No Happy Holidays"	Blige; Griffin; Geter	Griffin	5:16
12.	"The Love I Never Had"	James Harris III; Terry Lewis; James Wright; Blige	Jimmy Jam and Terry Lewis	6:48
13.	"Give Me You"	Diane Warren	Manuel Seal; Nate-Love Clemons	5:03
14.	"Let No Man Put Asunder"	Bruce Gray; Bruce Hawes	Malik Pendleton; Bryant Crockett; Moise LaPorte	4:23
Total length:				73:01

United States limited edition enhanced bonus CD
No.	Title	Writer(s)	Producer(s)	Length
1.	"Sincerity" (featuring Nas and DMX)	Kenny "K-Smoove" Kornegay; Blige, Earl Simmons; Nasir Jones	Kornegay	5:16
2.	"Confrontation"	Aston Taylor; Blige; Joseph Brim; James Heard; Lorenzo Grooms; Anthony Prendatt; Alphonse Constant; Patrick Harvey	Funkmaster Flex	4:15
3.	"All That I Can Say" (music video)
4.	"Deep Inside" (music video)
Total length:				9:41

International track listing
No.	Title	Writer(s)	Producer(s)	Length
1.	"All That I Can Say" (edit)	Hill	Hill	3:57
2.	"Sexy" (featuring Jadakiss)	Blige; Phillips; Wonder; Greene	Howard; Griffin	4:47
3.	"Deep Inside" (edit)	Blige; Geter; Deane; John; Taupin	Deane	4:20
4.	"Beautiful Ones" (edit)	Harrison; Ward; Bacharach; David	Harrison; Thompson	4:44
5.	"I'm in Love"	R. Wilson; L. Wilson	Blige	4:50
6.	"As" (duet with George Michael)	Wonder	Babyface	4:41
7.	"Time"	Blige; Thompson; Wonder	Blige; Thompson	5:07
8.	"Memories"	Schack; Karlin; Chanette Higgens; Channoah Higgens; Blige	Soulshock and Karlin	4:38
9.	"Don't Waste Your Time" (duet with Aretha Franklin)	Rubin; Rich	Babyface	4:10
10.	"Not Lookin'" (edit; duet with K-Ci Hailey)	Blige; Morris; Hostler; Lee	Lee; Hostler	4:49
11.	"Your Child" (edit)	Isaac	Isaac	4:40
12.	"No Happy Holidays" (edit)	Blige; Griffin; Geter	Griffin	4:45
13.	"The Love I Never Had" (edit)	Harris; Lewis; Wright; Blige	Jimmy Jam and Terry Lewis	5:45
14.	"Give Me You"	Warren	Seal; Clemons	5:03
15.	"Let No Man Put Asunder"	Gray; Hawes	Pendleton; Crockett; LaPorte	4:28
Total length:				70:44

European reissue bonus track
No.	Title	Writer(s)	Producer(s)	Length
16.	"Give Me You" (Niño radio mix)	Warren	Seal; Clemons; Hiten Bharadia^{[a]}; Philip Larsen^{[a]}	3:34
Total length:				74:18

Japanese track listing
No.	Title	Writer(s)	Producer(s)	Length
1.	"All That I Can Say"	Lauryn Hill	Lauryn Hill	3:57
2.	"Sexy" (featuring Jadakiss)	Blige; Phillips; Wonder; Greene	Howard; Griffin	4:47
3.	"Deep Inside"	Blige; Geter; Deane; John; Taupin	Deane	4:20
4.	"Beautiful Ones"	Harrison; Ward; Bacharach; David	Harrison; Thompson	4:44
5.	"I'm in Love"	R. Wilson; L. Wilson	Blige	4:50
6.	"As" (duet with George Michael)	Wonder	Babyface	4:41
7.	"Time"	Blige; Thompson; Wonder	Blige; Thompson	5:07
8.	"Memories"	Schack; Karlin; Chanette Higgens; Channoah Higgens; Blige	Soulshock and Karlin	4:38
9.	"Almost Gone"	Lalah Hathaway	Hathaway	4:09
10.	"Don't Waste Your Time" (duet with Aretha Franklin)	Rubin; Rich	Babyface	4:10
11.	"Not Lookin'" (duet with K-Ci Hailey)	Blige; Morris; Hostler; Lee	Lee; Hostler	4:49
12.	"Your Child"	Isaac	Isaac	4:40
13.	"No Happy Holidays"	Blige; Griffin; Geter	Griffin	4:45
14.	"The Love I Never Had"	Harris; Lewis; Wright; Blige	Jimmy Jam and Terry Lewis	5:45
15.	"Give Me You"	Warren	Seal; Clemons	5:03
16.	"Let No Man Put Asunder"	Gray; Hawes	Pendleton; Crockett; LaPorte	4:28
Total length:				74:53

Notes

- ^{^[a]} signifies a remix producer

Sample credits

- "Sexy" contains an interpolation of "I Can't Help It" as performed by Michael Jackson and written by Stevie Wonder
- "Deep Inside" contains a sample of "Bennie and the Jets" as performed by Elton John.
- "I’m In Love" is a cover version of and contains samples from The Gap Band song of the same name.
- "Beautiful Ones" contains a sample of "The April Fools" as performed by Earl Klugh.
- "Time" contains an interpolation of "Pastime Paradise" as performed by Stevie Wonder
- "Let No Man Put Asunder" is a cover version of the First Choice song of the same name; Musical arrangement is based on the Frankie Knuckles and Shep Pettibone remixes of the First Choice recording.

== Personnel ==
Unless otherwise indicated, liner notes based on the North American Edition of Mary.

=== Musicians ===
Vocals

- Dustin Adams – Background Vocals (3)
- Anthem (Channette & Channoah Higgins) – Background Vocals (7)
- Sharon Bryant – Background Vocals (5, 14)
- DMX – Rap (1 on US Limited Edition)
- Funkmaster Flex – Rap
- Aretha Franklin – Vocals (Sung by) (8)
- Cedric "K-Ci" Hailey – Vocals (9)
- Lauryn Hill – Background Vocals (1)
- Jadakiss – Rap (vocals) (2)
- Paulette McWilliams – Background Vocals (5, 13, 14)
- George Michael – Vocals (6 on International Edition)
- Cindy Mizelle – Background Vocals (14)
- Nas – Rap (1 on US Limited Edition)
- Terri Robinson – Background Vocals (3)
- Cecil Ward – Background Vocals (4)
- Audrey Wheeler – Background Vocals (14)
- Elizabeth Withers – Background Vocals (5)

Instruments

- Tom Barney – Bass (played by) (1)
- Chuck Berghofer – Bass (12)
- Nate–Love Clemons – Synthesizer Bass, Additional Synthesizers (13)
- Chuck Domenico – Bass (12)
- Nathan East – Bass (8)
- Paul Johnson – Bass (12)
- Eric Lorde – Bass (10)
- Larry Corbett – Cello (12)
- Dane Little – Cello (12)
- David Low – Cello (12)
- Babyface – Drum Machine, Acoustic Guitar, Additional Keyboards (8)
- Michael Clemons – Drums (13)
- Paulinho Da Costa – Percussion (12)
- Chris "Daddy" Dave – Live Drums (12)
- Che Pope – Drum Machine (1)
- Ike Lee III – Keyboards (9)
- Bryant Crockett – Keyboards (14)
- Loris Holland – Keyboards (1)
- Elton John – Piano (3)
- Dion Kipling – Additional Keyboards (10)
- Moise Laporte – Keyboards (14)
- Malik Pendleton – Synthesizer (14)
- Rex Rideout – Keyboards (6)
- Gen Rubin – Organ (played by), Wurlitzer (8)
- Manuel Seal Jr. – Electric Piano, Acoustic Piano, Keyboards (13)
- Gary Grant – Flugelhorn, Trumpet (12)
- Dave Trigg – Flugelhorn, Trumpet (12)
- Mark Bowers – Electric Guitar (14)
- Eric Clapton – Lead Guitar (13)
- Soong Lee – Guitar (9)
- Eli Lishinsky – Guitar (6)
- Jeff Mironov – Guitar (1)
- Paul Pesco – Additional Guitars (13)
- Mike Scott – Guitar (12)
- Kevin Deane – Additional Instruments (3)
- Kiyamma Griffin – Multiple Instruments (2, 11)
- Rich Harrison – Multiple Instruments (4)
- Jimmy Jam – Additional Instruments (12)
- Terry Lewis – Additional Instruments (12)
- Karlin – Multiple Instruments (7)
- Soulshock – Multiple Instruments (7)
- Chucky Thompson – Additional Instruments (5, 6)
- Reverend Dave Boruff – Saxophone (12)
- Slyde Hyde – Trombone (12)
- Bruce Otto – Trombone (12)
- Brian Dembow – Viola (12)
- Simon Oswell – Viola (12)
- Evan Wilson – Viola (12)
- Bruce Dukov – Concertmaster (12)
- Darius Campo – Violin (12)
- Joel Derouin – Violin (12)
- Ron Folsom – Violin (12)
- Armen Garabedian – Violin (12)
- Berj Garabedian – Violin (12)
- Endre Granat – Violin (12)
- Alan Grunfield – Violin (12)
- Kathleen Lenski – Violin (12)
- Anatoly Rosinsky – Violin (12)
- Bob Sanov – Violin (12)
- Eddie Stein – Violin (12)
- Roger Wilkie – Violin (12)

=== Production ===
Executive producers

- Mary J. Blige – Executive Producer, Lead Vocals (All Tracks), Background Vocals (3, 8, 10, 12–13)
- Kirk Burrowes – Executive Producer
- LaTonya Blige-DaCosta – Associate Executive Producer
- Hank Shocklee – Associate Executive Producer
- Ivy Skoff – Project Coordinator

Producers

- Mary J. Blige – 5
- Babyface – 8, “As”
- Bryant Crockett – 14
- Kevin Deane – 3
- Kiyamma Griffin – 2, 11
- Rich Harrison – 4
- Lauryn Hill – 1
- Dean Holster – 9
- Floyd Howard – 2
- Gerald Isaac – 10
- Jimmy Jam – 12
- Terry Lewis – 12
- Karlin – 7
- Soulshock – 7
- Moise Laporte – 14
- Ike Lee III – 9
- Nate Love-Clemons – 13
- Malik Pendleton – 14
- Manuel Seal Jr. – 13
- Chucky Thompson – 4, 6

Mixing

- Larry Alexander (11)
- Ben Arrindell (13)
- Commissioner Gordon (1)
- E’lyk – Mixing assistant (8)
- Ben Garrison (6)
- Jon Gass (8)
- Steve Hodge (12)
- Manny Marroquin (7)
- Malik Pendleton (14)
- Angela Piva (2–5, 9)
- Edwin “Eddie Ed” Ramos (10)
- Warren Riker (14)
- Tim Roggeman – Mixing assistant (1)
- Jamie Siegel – Mixing assistant (1)
- Soulshock (7)
- Yuri Zwadiuk (6)

Recording engineers

- Larry Alexander – Pro–Tools (9)
- Prince Charles Alexander (3)
- Geoff Allen – Assistant Engineer (13)
- Chuck Bailey – Assistant Engineer (4)
- Paul Boutin (8)
- Jim “Bonsai” Caruso – Percussion (12)
- Commissioner Gordon (1)
- Dave Dar – Assistant Engineer (2, 9)
- Mario De Arce – Pro–Tools (1)
- Alex Dejonge – Assistant Engineer (4)
- Steve Eigner (13)
- Niall Flynn – Additional Engineer (“As”)
- Jason Goldstein (5–6)
- Steve Hodge (12)
- George Karras (11)
- David Kennedy (4)
- Ken Lewis (14)
- Eli Lishinsky (6)
- Manny Marroquin (7)
- Steve Mazur – Assistant Engineer (8)
- Michael McCoy – Assistant Engineer (9)
- Appolon Noel (14)
- Angela Piva (2, 9)
- Tony Prendatt (1)
- Carl Robinson (13)
- Andy Salas – Assistant Engineer (4–5)
- Al Schmitt – Strings & Horns (12)
- Jamie Siegel – Assistant Engineer (1)
- Xavier Smith – Assistant Engineer (12)
- Alex Sok – Assistant Engineer (9)
- Michael Tocci – Assistant Engineer (3)

Programming

- Kobie Brown – Additional Music Programming (1)
- Bryant Crockett – Keyboard Instrument Programming (14)
- Niall Flynn – Additional Music Programming (“As”)
- Gerald Isaac – Music Programming (10)
- Moise Laporte – Keyboard Instrument Programming (14)

Arrangers

- Lauryn Hill – 1
- Gerald Isaac – 10
- Jimmy Jam – Vocals on 12
- Terry Lewis – Vocals on 12
- Karlin – 7
- Soulshock – 7
- Ike Lee III – 9
- George Michael – “As”
- Paul Riser – Strings on 13
- Randy Waldman – Strings & Horns on 12
- Cecil Ward – Vocals on 4
- Jim Wright – Rhythm on 12

== Charts ==
=== Weekly charts ===
Weekly chart performance for Mary
Chart (1999)	Peak position
Australian Albums (ARIA)	66
Canada Top Albums/CDs (RPM)	9
Canadian R&B Albums (Nielsen SoundScan)	9
Dutch Albums (Album Top 100)	20
European Albums (Music & Media)	19
French Albums (SNEP)	51
German Albums (Offizielle Top 100)	38
Japanese Albums (Oricon)	13
Norwegian Albums (VG-lista)	15
Scottish Albums (Official Charts)	30
Swedish Albums (Sverigetopplistan)	6
Swiss Albums (Schweizer Hitparade)	16
UK Albums (Official Charts)	5
UK R&B Albums (Official Charts)	1
US Billboard 200	2
US Top R&B/Hip-Hop Albums (Billboard)	1

=== Year-end charts ===
1999 year-end chart performance for Mary
Chart (1999)	Position
UK Albums (OCC)	170
US Billboard 200	89
US Top R&B/Hip-Hop Albums (Billboard)	20

2000 year-end chart performance for Mary
Chart (2000)	Position
US Billboard 200	87
US Top R&B/Hip-Hop Albums (Billboard)	17

== Certifications ==
Certifications for Mary
Region	Certification	Certified units/sales
Canada (Music Canada)	Gold	50,000^{^}
Japan (RIAJ)	Platinum	200,000^{^}
United Kingdom (BPI)	Gold	100,000^{*}
United States (RIAA)	2× Platinum	2,100,000
^{*} Sales figures based on certification alone.^{^} Shipments figures based on certification alone.

== See also ==
- List of number-one R&B albums of 1999 (U.S.)
