= Kim Sozzi =

- Also known as: Kim Styles
- Born: Kim Marie Sozzi
- Origin: Long Island, New York, United States
- Genres: Electronica, dance, dance-pop
- Occupation: Singer-songwriter
- Instrument: Vocals
- Years active: 1999–present
- Labels: Columbia; Epic; Ultra
- Formerly of: MYNT
- Website: Official website

Kim Sozzi is an American dance-pop singer from Long Island, New York.

== Career ==
Kim Sozzi's career began in 1999 when she signed a contract on Columbia Records for her first major album, Life Goes On. Her first single from the album was "Til I Cry You Out Of Me", followed by "Letting Go" which was on the soundtrack for the TV show Dawson's Creek. Both singles were successful, but the album was shelved and never released. Another single, "Feelin' Me", was a popular dance track.

As part of the group MYNT, Kim Sozzi released the single "How Did You Know" followed by an album, Still Not Sorry, which featured Kim Sozzi on vocals on some tracks. Kim Sozzi later left the group to pursue her solo career.

Kim Sozzi signed with Ultra Records and released a new single, "Alone", a cover of the Heart song, and another single "Break Up" which achieved some success in the US and the UK. In 2008, she released "Like a Star". "Feel Your Love" was released at the end of 2008, becoming Kim Sozzi's most successful single, peaking at No. 1 on the Billboard Dance Airplay Chart. "Just One Day" was released on July 21, 2009, on Ultra Records. She also made a song with Jim Johnston "You Can Look But You Can't Touch" for the WWE Divas Nikki and Brie, The Bella Twins, which is now solely attributed to Nikki.

== Discography ==
=== Albums ===
- 1999: Life Goes On
- 2007: Still Not Sorry
- 2009: Just One Day

=== EPs ===
- 2011: EP 1
- 2011: EP 2

=== Singles ===
- "Til I Cry You Out of Me" (Teaching Mrs. Tingle) (Soundtrack) (from Life Goes On)
- "Letting Go" (Dawsons Creek) (Soundtrack) - (from Life Goes On)
- "Feelin' Me" - Edel Records
- "Every 1's a Winner" (as Kim Styles) - (from The German Album)
- "Show Me the Way" (as Kim Styles feat. José Carreras) - (from The German Album)
- "How Did You Know" (Soundtrack) - (from Still Not Sorry) (No. 3 Billboard Dance Charts)
- "Stay" - (from Still Not Sorry)
- "Alone" - (from Just One Day)
- "Break Up" - (from Just One Day) (No. 23 UK Singles Chart June 2007)
- "Like a Star" - (from Just One Day)
- "Feel Your Love" - (from Just one Day) (No. 1 Billboard Dance Charts)
- "Kiss Me Back" - (from Just One Day) (No. 1 Billboard Dance Charts 12/9/2009)
- "Secret Love" - (from Just One Day) (No. 1 Billboard Dance Charts 2/22/2010)
- "Just One Day" - (from Just One Day)
- "Rated R" - standalone digital single
- "Little Bird" - standalone digital single (No. 15 Billboard Dance Charts)
- "Crystallized" - standalone digital single
- "Never Say Goodnight"
- "How Did You Know" - standalone digital single

== Music videos ==
- "Every 1's a Winner"
- "Break Up"
- "Feel Your Love"
