= Jock series =

Superseries of sports anthem music albums by Tommy Boy Records and ESPN

The Jock series is a superseries of sports anthem music albums started by Tommy Boy Records and ESPN in 1994.

The Jock series consists of the Jock Rock, the Jock Jams and the Slam Jams series.

== Jock Rock ==
The Jock Rock series of albums consisted of alternative and classic rock songs. Some tracks on the Jock Rock albums were dubbed into the "Jock Jam Megamix".

Year	Album	U.S. peak
1994	Jock Rock, Volume 1	79
1995	Jock Rock, Volume 2	121
1999	Jock Rock 2000	78

== Jock Jams ==
Albums in the Jock Jams series mainly consist of 1980s and 1990s dance and house music, as well as hip hop, classic disco, mashups, and cheerleaders and other sports figures saying phrases. When some of the songs and quotes became popular, they were incorporated into a mash-up entitled "The Jock Jam".

Year	Album	U.S. peak
1995	Jock Jams, Volume 1	30
1996	Jock Jams, Volume 2	10
1997	Jock Jams, Volume 3	23
1998	Jock Jams, Volume 4	20
1999	Jock Jams, Volume 5	51
2001	Jock Jams: The All-Star Jock Jams	188

=== The All-Star Jock Jams ===
Jock Jams: The All-Star Jock Jams

Compilation album by Various Artists
- Released: November 6, 2001
- Genre: Rock; pop; electronic
- Length: 55:26
- Label: Tommy Boy
- Producer: ESPN

Jock Jams series chronology
Jock Jams, Volume 5 (1999)	Jock Jams: The All-Star Jock Jams (2001)

Jock Jams: The All-Star Jock Jams is the sixth album in the series, released on November 6, 2001. This album release was the last album released under the Jock series name.

Tracks were:

1. "Let's Get Ready to Rumble" - Michael Buffer
2. "We're Not Gonna Take It" - Twisted Sister
3. "...Baby One More Time" - Britney Spears
4. "Bye Bye Bye" - *NSYNC
5. "Who Let the Dogs Out" - Baha Men
6. "I See You Baby" - Groove Armada
7. "Song 2" - Blur
8. "Rock and Roll, Pt. 2" - Gary Glitter
9. "Hip Hop Hooray" - Naughty by Nature
10. "Jungle Boogie" - Kool & the Gang
11. "Right Here, Right Now" - Fatboy Slim
12. "Kernkraft 400" - Zombie Nation
13. "Go" - Moby
14. "Get Ready for This" - 2 Unlimited
15. "Whoomp! (There It Is)" - Tag Team
16. "Jump Around" - House of Pain
17. "Na Na Na Na (Kiss Him Goodbye)" - Steam
  Professional ratings
  Review scores
  Source	Rating
  Allmusic	3.5/5 stars

Chart (2001)	Peak position
U.S. Billboard 200	188

== Downfall of Jock Jams ==
As the final Jock compilation album was released in 2001, Tommy Boy Records faced low critical reception, low sales, stiff competition from competitor Now That's What I Call Music!'s U.S. series, and loss of song rights from record labels as a result of Now Music. Tommy Boy's CEO Tom Silverman has been quoted saying that "labels wouldn't license their songs to us when the NOW compilations started coming out under a collective revenue-sharing agreement", in regard to why the label stopped releasing new compilation albums. He noted that it "It really pissed me off..." because, to him, "...it felt like an anti-trust thing. How can four labels make a decision to do that?"

Jock Jams also experienced a decline in 'anthems' that were available to use to justify a new album every year. The slow-to-adapt sporting industry had a limited number of songs that were recognizable or actively being used by a sporting team. Tom says that "It got harder toward the end to find songs, yeah. We would use old songs because there was not enough new stuff to justify an album. We couldn't find 15 songs every year that were the new anthems."

Napster, and the wave of piracy it introduced in the early 2000s, affected the music industry in huge ways. With Napster, anyone could illegally download any Jock series compilation without paying for a physical copy. This "free" method of downloading music allowed anyone to create their own CD mixes, without the need of the music industry, record labels, or special permission to mix songs from, for example, Jock Jams, Volume 1, Volume 2, and Volume 4.

== Legacy ==
Jock Jams legacy is defined by Volume 1 going platinum in under a year and peaking at No. 30 on the Billboard charts. Following its commercial success over 6 albums, its downfall was marked by the rise of Napster, the slow adaptation of the sporting industry, and loss of song rights controlled by four big labels in the late 1990s/early 2000s.

The All-Star Jock Jams (volume 6) reached No. 188 on the Billboard 200 for the week of November 24, 2001. It remained at that position for one week, falling from chart the following week.

Despite no further releases, Jock Jams has had a lasting impact on sporting events and venues, as well as being credited for paving the way for modern bands to get their music into stadiums and integrated into sporting culture. In the words of Tom Silverman, "...if you look now, they still play the Village People everywhere. There are songs that we used on that series that are still 80 percent of what you hear at games today. Fall Out Boy is one of the 20 percent of new stuff you hear, along with Pitbull, maybe Flo Rida and Pharrell."
