= Ray Castoldi =

American organist

Ray Castoldi has been the stadium organist at Madison Square Garden since 1989. During the summer, when the New York Rangers and New York Knicks are spending their offseasons, Castoldi is heard at the organ at New York Mets games at Citi Field on weekends (and previously Shea Stadium). He is the only person to play for the Mets, Rangers and Knicks in the same season. (Gladys Goodding played organ for the Brooklyn Dodgers, the Knicks and Rangers in the same year; likewise Eddie Layton and Jack Shaindlin played for the New York Yankees, Knicks and Rangers in the same season.)

Castoldi has played the organ at the 1994 NBA Finals, 1994 Stanley Cup Final, 1994 NHL All-Star Game, 1998 NBA All-Star Game, 1999 NBA Finals, 2014 Stanley Cup Final, and the 2026 NBA Finals all of which were played at Madison Square Garden. He also played during the 2000 World Series, played at Shea Stadium, and the 2013 MLB All-Star Game at Citi Field. He was also a music director for the ice hockey competition at the 2006 Winter Olympics in Turin, Italy. He has also played for many other events such as several Pro Bowls, several NHL All-Star Games, and several Winter Olympic Hockey games.

Castoldi has contributed to the Jock Jams and Jock Rock series of albums, as well as Hallmark Cards.

Castoldi also wrote Slapshot, the song that is played after the Rangers score a goal at Madison Square Garden.
