= Sentimento (disambiguation) =

Sentimento is a 2002 album by Andrea Bocelli

Sentimento (Italian and Portuguese "feeling") may also refer to:

- Sentimento (Bonga album), 1985
- Sentimento (EP), a 2009 EP by Valerio Scanu
- Sentimento (Valerio Scanu song)
- "Sentimento", a 1968 song by Patty Pravo
- "Sentimento", by Piccola Orchestra Avion Travel, winning song at Sanremo Music Festival 2000

== See also ==
- Sentimiento (disambiguation) (Spanish)
