= I Am (Mary J. Blige song) =

Single by Mary J. Blige

from the album Stronger with Each Tear
- Released: December 8, 2009
- Length: 3:28
- Label: Matriarch; Geffen
- Songwriters: Johntá Austin; Magnus Beite; Mary J. Blige; Esther Dean; Mikkel Eriksen; Tor Erik Hermansen
- Producer: Stargate

Mary J. Blige singles chronology
"What Child Is This" (2009)	"I Am" (2009)	"Each Tear" (2010)

Music video
- "I Am" on YouTube

"I Am" is a song by American R&B singer Mary J. Blige. It was written by Blige, Johntá Austin, Ester Dean, Magnus Beite, Tor Erik Hermansen, Mikkel Eriksen for her ninth studio album, Stronger with Each Tear (2009), while production was helmed by Hermansen and Eriksen under their production moniker Stargate. Lyrically, the song "I Am" confidently tells one's lover nobody can treat them better than the person they are with at the present time.

== Release and promotion ==
"I Am" was sent to urban radio in the week beginning November 10, 2009 and was released as a digital download on December 8, 2009 She performed "I Am" live for the first time at the 2009 American Music Awards on November 22, 2009. Blige also performed "I Am" on Lopez Tonight, So You Think You Can Dance, The Jay Leno Show, Jimmy Kimmel Live!, A&E Television's Private Sessions, The Today Show, The View, The Ellen DeGeneres Show, and on the Late Show with David Letterman. In the United Kingdom, the song was released as the first single from Stronger with Each Tear on March 1, 2010. Mary J Blige performed "I Am" on Alan Carr: Chatty Man on March 11, 2010.

== Critical reception ==
BET.com wrote of the song: "This song is a perfect showcase of Mary's brighter outlook in the new millennium. Looking back at all the drama and pain of the '90s – both in her music and in her personal life – it's hard not to smile hearing her newfound confidence and optimism here."

== Chart performance ==
"I Am" debuted at number 67 on the US Billboard Hot 100 in the week ending December 26, 2009. It eventually peaked at number 55, also reaching number three on the Dance Club Songs and number four on the Hot R&B/Hip-Hop Songs as well as topping the Adult R&B Songs. Billboard ranked it 12th on the latter chart's 2010 year-end ranking. In the United Kingdom, "I Am" entered and peaked on the UK Singles Chart at number 24 on March 7, 2010. Elsewhere, it peaked at number 11 on the Japan Hot 100.

== Music video ==
A music video for "I Am" was directed by Anthony Mandler, who has also produced the visuals for Blige's other 2009 singles "The One" and "Stronger." It was filmed in various locations throughout Somis, California, in particular at the 10,000-square-foot L-shaped Sharpe residence that had been completed in 2005 as well as the nearby coastline. The video premiered via Vevo on December 8, 2009.

== Track list ==
UK CD single
No.	Title	Producer(s)	Length
1.	"I Am"	Stargate	3:23
2.	"I Am" (instrumental)	Stargate	3:26

Digital remix single
No.	Title	Producer(s)	Length
1.	"I Am" (David Audé remix)	Stargate; David Audé^{[a]}	6:28
2.	"I Am" (David Audé radio remix)	Stargate; Audé^{[a]}	3:47
3.	"I Am" (Boy Baxter club remix)	Stargate; Boy Baxter^{[a]}	5:42
4.	"I Am" (Boy Baxter radio remix)	Stargate; Baxter^{[a]}	3:18

Notes

- ^{^a} denotes co-producer(s)

== Charts ==
=== Weekly charts ===
Weekly chart performance for "I Am"
Chart (2009–10)	Peak position
Canada Hot 100 (Billboard)	96
European Hot 100 Singles (Billboard)	95
Japan Hot 100 (Billboard)	11
Scottish Singles Sales (Official Charts)	69
South Korea International (Circle)	28
UK Singles (Official Charts)	34
UK Hip Hop/R&B (Official Charts)	9
US Billboard Hot 100	55
US Dance Club Songs (Billboard)	3
US Hot R&B/Hip-Hop Songs (Billboard)	4
US Rhythmic Airplay (Billboard)	25

=== Year-end charts ===
Year-end chart performance for "I Am"
Chart (2010)	Position
US Adult R&B Songs (Billboard)	12
US Hot R&B/Hip-Hop Songs (Billboard)	8

== Release history ==
List of release dates, showing region, release format, label, and reference
Region	Date	Format(s)	Label	Ref
United States	November 24, 2009	Airplay	Matriarch, Geffen Records	
United States	December 8, 2009	Digital download	Matriarch, Geffen Records	
United Kingdom	February 25, 2010	Digital download	Polydor Records	
United Kingdom	March 1, 2010	CD single	Polydor Records	
