= Lasciami entrare =

Studio album by Valerio Scanu
- Released: 2014
- Genre: Pop
- Length: 41:09
- Language: Italian, English
- Label: NatyLoveYou
- Producer: Valerio Scanu

Valerio Scanu chronology
Live in Roma (2013)	Lasciami entrare (2014)	It's Xmas Day (2014)

Singles from Lasciami entrare
- 1. "Sui nostri passi" Released: 7 January 2014; 2. "Lasciami entrare" Released: 22 April 2014

Lasciami entrare (Italian: Let Me In) is the fifth album of the Italian singer Valerio Scanu, which was released on January 28, 2014 by NatyLoveYou.

The album was preceded by the single "Sui nostri passi" released on January 7, 2014. A week later the videoclip was released.

The album contains 11 tracks, two of which are in English, "Sometimes Love" and "Alone" and the rest in Italian. A 12th song "Parole di cristallo2 in acoustic version is available only with the digital album download.

The album was recorded after contract termination with recording label Emi Music Italy and the creation of his own label NatyLoveYou.

In this album we see Scanu in the roles of singer, lyrics writer and also producer. Scanu also composed the music of the song "Parole di cristallo". The lyrics of eight songs in this album have been written by Scanu. "Sometimes Love" has been written by singer/composer Kykah while "Un giorno in più" has been written together with singer/composer Silvia Olari.

The arrangements and artistic production was assigned to Luca Mattioni, who, together with two mastering engineers, Matt Howe who mixed the album in London and Chris Gehringer who mastered the album in New York, gave an international sound to this project.

The album is produced and presented by NatyLoveYou, an independent recording label founded by Scanu himself, and distributed by Self Distribuzioni and Digital Believe Italy (for the digital version).

Scanu presented to his fans a brief explanation of every song. In particular, the title of the album 'Lasciami Entrare', when translated means "Let Me In", represents the dream of the artist to enter into the heart of people, even into the heart of those who do not know him.

== Track listing ==
1. "Sui nostri passi" (Valerio Scanu, Luca Mattioni, Mario Cianchi) – 3:43
2. "Come fanno le stelle" (Federica Fratoni, Daniele Coro) – 3:54
3. "Parole di cristallo" (Scanu, Davide Rossi, Federico Paciotti) – 4:46
4. "Lasciami entrare" (Scanu, Paciotti) – 2:54
5. "Per noi" (Scanu, Rossi, M. Tommasi, Paciotti) – 3:11
6. "Ancora per me" (Scanu, Paciotti) – 3,40
7. "Alone" (W. O. Knight, Mattioni) – 4:15
8. "Un giorno in più" (Scanu, A. Amati, S. Olari) – 3:31
9. "Vorrei dirtelo" (Scanu, L. Bussoletti, Paciotti) – 3:04
10. "Sometimes love" (W. O. Knight, F. Turco, D. Serafino) – 3:27
11. "Dormi" (Scanu, R. Canale, R. L. Di Benedetto) – 3:54
12. "Parole di cristallo" (acoustic) (Scanu, Rossi, Paciotti) – 3:30 (download versions only)

== Charts ==
Chart (2014)	Peak position
Italian Albums (FIMI)	2
