= Stronger with Each Tear =

Studio album by Mary J. Blige
- Released: December 18, 2009
- Genre: R&B
- Length: 48:19
- Labels: Matriarch; Geffen
- Producers: Jeff Bhasker; Bryan-Michael Cox; D'Mile; Ron Fair; Rodney Jerkins; Anthony M. Jones; J.U.S.T.I.C.E. League; Ryan Leslie; Polow da Don; RedOne; Salaam Remi; Pat Reynolds; The Runners; Raphael Saadiq; Stargate; Stereotypes; The-Dream; Tricky Stewart; Supa Dups; will.i.am; WyldCard

Mary J. Blige chronology
Growing Pains (2007)	Stronger with Each Tear (2009)	My Life II... The Journey Continues (Act 1) (2011)

Alternative covers
- International artwork

Singles from Stronger with Each Tear
- 1. "The One" Released: July 21, 2009; 2. "Stronger" Released: August 18, 2009; 3. "I Am" Released: December 8, 2009; 4. "Each Tear" Released: February 26, 2010; 5. "We Got Hood Love" Released: March 30, 2010

Stronger with Each Tear is the ninth studio album from American singer-songwriter Mary J. Blige, released in the US on December 21, 2009, under Blige's imprint Matriarch Records. Internationally, it was released December 18, 2009, in Australia and Germany, and on various dates between December 2009 and May 2010 in other territories.

Stronger with Each Tear is an R&B album with contemporary production. The album debuted at number two on the US Billboard 200 chart with first-week sales of 332,000 copies, and earned Blige a record ninth number one debut on the US R&B/Hip-Hop Albums chart. Stronger with Each Tear received generally positive reviews from critics, winning the 2010 NAACP Image Award for Outstanding Album.

== Background ==
Blige started working on her ninth album while she toured with Robin Thicke in 2008. In an interview with Rap-Up magazine she said:

The album represents who and what I am right now. I'm a stronger human being after all the growing pains. It's about life, love, change, strength—mostly really knowing who you are and being confident in that.

The album was initially titled Stronger, after the song "Stronger", which Blige recorded and released as the lead single from the soundtrack Music Inspired by More than a Game from the LeBron James' documentary More than a Game. However Rap-Up later revealed that the album had been re-titled Stronger with Each Tear.

== Composition ==
Music journalist Robert Christgau described the Stronger with Each Tear as containing "midtempo love vows." The Irish Times said that with the album, Blige "dabbled" in contemporary music trends of the time. Album opener "Tonight" has "atmospheric" qualities. Lead single and track two, "The One" with Drake, features auto-tune vocals. Track four, "Good Love" with T.I., was called "groovy" and a "surprising" hit. "I Am," track five, is a "classic Blige" hip-hop/pop single that "perfectly captures the album’s overall mood." Track 10, "Kitchen," has a "strong melody" a gospel piano. Track 11, "In the Morning," has a Motown sound. From the motion picture Precious, album closer "Color" (alternatively titled "I Can See in Color") resembles a retro "old-style" of soul with electric piano instrumentation and a gospel backing.

== Release and promotion ==
The album was originally scheduled for US release on November 24, 2009 but this was pushed back to December 15, 2009 which would have put Blige's album in a chart battle with Alicia Keys' album The Element of Freedom. The album was pushed back once more to December 21, 2009. Australian media outlets revealed that the album's international version would have an altered track listing, containing a duet version of "Each Tear" with the Australian artist Vanessa Amorosi. There are also four other versions of the track performed by the Italian singer Tiziano Ferro and the UK singer Jay Sean, Rea Garvey and K'naan.

After a number of appearances to promote the song "Stronger" for the soundtrack Music Inspired by More than a Game, Blige formally began the album's promotion in America by premiering the second single "I Am" at the American Music Awards (2009). The following day she appeared on the Lopez Tonight show for an interview and encore performance of "I Am". Blige also appeared on The Jay Leno Show, The Today Show, and was also on a special shown on BET named Words & Sounds With Mary J. Blige. She was on a taping of The View. On April 21, 2010, Blige appeared on American Idol's charity telethon, Idol Gives Back to perform her cover of Led Zeppelin's "Stairway to Heaven" with Orianthi and Randy Jackson on guitars.

On April 13, 2010, Blige appeared on an episode of The Oprah Winfrey Show where she performed "Each Tear" and her version of "Stairway to Heaven."

=== Singles ===
- "The One", featuring Drake was released as the album's first single in the US and Australia on July 21, 2009. Featuring Drake, the song was co-written by Ester Dean and produced by Rodney Jerkins. It peaked at number sixty-three on the US Billboard Hot 100.
- "I Am" which was written by Blige, Johntá Austin and Ester Dean with music produced by Stargate, was released as the first international single (second in the US) in December 2009. It debuted on the Hot R&B/Hip Hop Songs chart at number forty-six prior to its full release and peaked at number four upon release. It debuted on Japan's Oricon chart at number 92 and peaked at number 11 on that chart, while also debuting on the Hot 100 at sixty-seven and peaking at number fifty-five. It was also the international lead single from the album.
- "Each Tear" was released as the second international single from the album in February 2010. There are different versions of the song. For Australia, it features the singer-songwriter Vanessa Amorosi; for Italy, Tiziano Ferro; for the UK, Jay Sean; for Germany, Rea Garvey and for Canada, K'naan. Marcus Raboy filmed a video which was then edited to show each of the guests in versions for their respective markets. It peaked at number one in Italy and number 183 in the UK, while failing to chart elsewhere. The single was not released in the United States.
- "We Got Hood Love" featuring Trey Songz was released as the third US single from the album on March 30, 2010. The song debuted at number eighty-two on the Hot R&B/Hip-Hop Songs chart following the album's release due to strong digital downloads and radio airplay. A video was filmed with Mary J. Blige and football player George Wilson in Miami, while Trey Songz filmed his scenes in a New York City apartment. Chris Robinson directed the video for the single with a planned May 10, 2010 premiere through Vevo, though it actually appeared on Rap-Up on May 6, 2010.

Other songs

- "Stairway to Heaven" was released on April 13, 2010, as an iTunes only release. Available as a download only and with no video the Led Zeppelin cover features Travis Barker, Randy Jackson, Steve Vai and Orianthi. Another Zeppelin cover, "Whole Lotta Love", is the single's B-side. The songs only appear on the international version of the album. It was released again on April 22, 2010, to raise money for American Idol's Idol Gives Back.

== Critical reception ==
Professional ratings
Aggregate scores
Source	Rating
Metacritic	75/100
Review scores
Source	Rating
AllMusic	3.5/5 stars
Chicago Tribune	3/4 stars
Christgau's Consumer Guide	(3-star Honorable Mention)
Entertainment Weekly	B
The Irish Times	3/5 stars
Los Angeles Times	3/4 stars
Rolling Stone	3.5/5 stars
Spin	6/10
The Times	3/5 stars
USA Today	3/4 stars

Stronger with Each Tear received generally favorable reviews from critics. At Metacritic, which assigns a normalized rating out of 100 to reviews from mainstream critics, the album has an average score of 75 based on twelve reviews.

Andy Kellman from AllMusic called "Stronger with Each Tear a "very good Blige album, if not quite a classic. One of her briefest sets, it is tremendously (almost studiously) balanced between all the ground she has covered so well before. That's no criticism, though, since most of the songs are easily memorable and display so much range." Boston Globe critic Sarah Rodman found that the album was a "reminder that Blige gets stronger with each album", further noting: "The queen of hip-hop soul splits her loyalty between three masters with the agility of a gymnast, but she manages to hold a mood with seamless transitions between each." Similarly, Billboard wrote: "Like fine wine and Brett Favre, some things just get better with time [...] Blige has never been in better voice-or more adventurous."

Margaret Wapplerf from The Los Angeles Times felt that Stronger with Each Tear finds Blige "as in touch with that resilient truth as ever, her personal discoveries bound in slick but never alienating packaging." USA Today editor Steve Jones remarked that the album "finds the now-mature Blige happy, confident and ready to have some fun." While he felt that the "upbeat songs don't lend themselves to the emotional torrents that used to flow from her regularly," a "stellar list of producers and songwriters [...] give her plenty of radio-friendly beats in keeping with the album's overall positive vibe." BBC Music critic Daryl Easlea called it a "body of work that is one of the strongest in R&B. Although Stronger with Each Tear may not be one of her greatest works, it ensures that Blige remains as relevant as any of her more recent contemporaries."

In a mixed review, Jon Pareles from The New York Times wrote that Blige's "chosen producers are masters of what might be called algorithm-and-blues: crisply digitized grids of beats and hooks [...] The arrangements are often supremely clever, but the songs can also be busy and bloodless, and they’re built for adequate voices, not commanding ones. Often they tend to treat vocals as one more neatly placed sound effect." Mikael Wood from Spin magazine wrote: "Blige has spent the past decade effecting a slow transformation from R&B's queen of pain to the closest thing the genre counts to Oprah Winfrey [...] It's hard to believe this is the same woman who once felt the need to announce she was done with drama. Yet despite the conviction that those track names suggest—and despite solid writing and production contributions from A-listers [...] it feels less vital than 2005's terrific The Breakthrough or 2007's Growing Pains [...] The result is minor Mary—strong by many standards, a bit tepid by hers." In his Consumer Guide, Robert Christgau offered the description, "plainspoken, low-drama, midtempo love vows, with attempted glamour relegated to the cover shoot", while naming "Tonight" and "I Am" as the record's highlights.

== Accolades ==
Year	Region	Award	Category	Result
2010	United States	NAACP Image Awards	Outstanding Album	Won

== Commercial performance ==
The album debuted at number two on the US Billboard 200 chart with first-week sales of 332,000 copies. It also went to number one on the R&B chart. Blige is the ninth woman in SoundScan's 18-year history to see at least three albums all debut with an opening sales week of 300,000 or more. Stronger with Each Tear had sold 726,100 copies in the United States by April 2010, and was certified Gold by the RIAA on January 6, 2011.

In the UK, it debuted at number 33 on the main albums chart in its first week but dropped out of the top forty on its second week. On the UK R&B Chart it debuted at number four and fell nine places to number 13 in its second week.

Following the album's US release, "We Got Hood Love" charted at 82 on the Hot R&B/Hip Hop Songs chart from strong digital downloads. Album track "I Feel Good" entered the Hot R&B/Hip-Hop Songs chart at number 83 on the issue dated February 6, 2010, and later reached a peak of 68. "Good Love" featuring T.I. entered the Hot R&B/Hip-Hop Songs chart at number 59 and peaked at 58.

== Track listing ==
Standard track listing
No.	Title	Writer(s)	Producer(s)	Length
1.	"Tonight"	Mary J. Blige; Aliaune Thiam; Edwin Birdsong; Andrew Harr; Jermaine Jackson; Kevin Cossom	The Runners; Akon^{[a]}	4:00
2.	"The One" (featuring Drake)	Blige; Aubrey Graham; Ester Dean; Rodney Jerkins	Jerkins	3:14
3.	"Said and Done"	Blige; Ryan Leslie	Leslie	3:23
4.	"Good Love" (featuring T.I.)	Shaffer Smith; Jeremy Reeves; Ray Romulus; Jonathan Yip	Stereotypes; Ne-Yo^{[a]}	4:01
5.	"I Feel Good"	Smith; Tor Erik Hermansen; Mikkel Eriksen	Stargate; Ne-Yo^{[a]}	3:47
6.	"I Am"	Blige; Johntá Austin; E. Dean; Hermansen; Eriksen	Stargate; Ron Fair^{[b]}	3:23
7.	"Each Tear"	Blige; Mitchum Chin; Dwayne Chin-Quee	Supa Dups; Fair^{[b]}	4:15
8.	"I Love U (Yes I Du)"	Blige; Jamal Jones; E. Dean; Devon Reed; Donald Level; Billy Williams	Polow da Don	3:23
9.	"We Got Hood Love" (featuring Trey Songz)	Blige; Bryan-Michael Cox; Kendrick Dean; Austin	Cox; WyldCard; Fair^{[c]}	4:15
10.	"Kitchen"	Blige; Terius Nash; Christopher Stewart	Tricky Stewart; The-Dream; Kuk Harrell^{[a]}	4:31
11.	"In the Morning"	Blige; Anesha Birchett; Antea Birchett	D'Mile; Fair^{[c]}	4:36
12.	"I Can See In Color" (from the motion picture Precious)	Blige; Raphael Saadiq; LaNeah Menzies	Saadiq	5:31
Total length:				48:19

US Amazon MP3 download bonus tracks
No.	Title	Writer(s)	Producer(s)	Length
13.	"Stay"	Blige; E. Dean; Traci Hale	Anthony M. Jones	3:49
14.	"Gonna Make It" (featuring Jazmine Sullivan)	Blige; Sullivan	Salaam Remi	3:36
Total length:				55:44

US iTunes bonus tracks
No.	Title	Writer(s)	Producer(s)	Length
13.	"Closer"	Blige; LaNeah Menzies	Leslie	4:11
14.	"Brand New" (Pre-Order Only)	Blige; Erik Ortiz; Kevin Crowe; C. Brown III; D. Young; B. Sigler	J.U.S.T.I.C.E. League	3:39
Total length:				56:09

International edition
No.	Title	Writer(s)	Producer(s)	Length
1.	"Whole Lotta Love"	Jimmy Page; Robert Plant; John Bonham; John Paul Jones; Willie Dixon	RedOne; Fair	3:34
2.	"Tonight"	Blige; Thiam; Birdsong; Harr; Jackson; Cossom	The Runners; Akon^{[a]}	4:00
3.	"The One"	Blige; Graham; Dean; Jerkins	Jerkins	3:14
4.	"I Can't Wait" (featuring will.i.am)	Blige; William Adams	will.i.am	4:25
5.	"Good Love" (featuring T.I.)	Smith; Reeves; Romulus; Yip	Stereotypes; Ne-Yo^{[a]}	4:01
6.	"I Feel Good"	Smith; Hermansen; Eriksen	Stargate; Ne-Yo^{[a]}	3:47
7.	"I Am"	Blige; Austin; E. Dean; Hermansen; Eriksen	Stargate; Fair^{[b]}	3:23
8.	"Each Tear" (featuring Jay Sean)	Blige; Chin; Chin-Quee	Supa Dups; Fair^{[b]}	4:32
9.	"I Love U (Yes I Du)"	Blige; Jones; E. Dean; Reed; Level; Williams	Polow da Don	3:23
10.	"City on Fire"	Blige; Jeff Bhasker; Pat Reynolds	Bhasker; Reynolds	3:34
11.	"Stronger" (from motion picture More than a Game)	Blige; E. Dean; Chris Brown; Chauncy Hollis; Jones; D. Dalton	Polow da Don; Hit-Boy	4:09
12.	"In the Morning"	Blige; Anesha Birchett; Antea Birchett	D'Mile; Fair^{[c]}	4:36
13.	"Color" (from the motion picture Precious)	Blige; Saadiq; Menzies	Saadiq	5:31
14.	"Stairway to Heaven" (featuring Travis Barker, Randy Jackson, Steve Vai and Orianthi)	Jimmy Page; Robert Plant	Fair; Tal Herzberg	8:44
15.	"I Am" (Dave Audé Remix)	Blige; Austin; E. Dean; Hermansen; Eriksen	Dave Audé	6:28
Total length:				67:21

Notes

- In the US, "Each Tear" is a solo song, but on international versions feature Jay Sean except for in Italy where it features Tiziano Ferro; Vanessa Amorosi for Australia; Rea Garvey for Germany; and K'naan for Canada.
- ^{^[a]} signifies co-producer(s)
- ^{^[b]} signifies vocal producer(s)
- ^{^[c]} signifies additional producer(s)

Sample credits

- "Tonight" contains elements of "Rapper Dapper Snapper" as written and performed by Edwin Birdsong.
- "I Love U (Yes I Du)" contains a sample of the recording "Let the Dollar Circulate" as performed by Billy Paul.

== Personnel ==
- Kory Aaron – assistant engineer
- Mary J. Blige – executive producer, vocals, backing vocals, co-writer
- Dylan "3-D" Dresdow – mix engineer
- Jaime Martinez – assistant engineer
- Aubry "Big Juice" Delaine – engineer
- Steven Dennis – assistant engineer
- Pat Dillett – engineer
- Mike "Handz" Donaldson – engineer
- Mikkel S. Eriksen – engineer
- Ron Fair – vocal tracking
- Drew FitzGerald – creative director
- Brian "Big Bass" Gardner – mastering
- Thaddis Kuk Harrell – vocal tracking
- Tal Herzberg – engineer
- Josh Houghkirk – mixing assistant
- Kendu Isaacs – producer, management
- Jaycen Joshua – mixing
- Jaha Johnson – management
- Kim Kimble – hair stylist
- Damien Lewis – engineer
- Giancarlo Lino – mixing assistant
- Anthony Mandler – photography
- Tony Mardini – engineer
- D'Andre Michael – make-up
- Peter Mokran – mixing
- Luis Navarro – assistant engineer
- Carlos Oyanedel – engineer
- Tal Oz – assistant
- Dave Pensado – mixing
- Marni Senofonte – stylist
- Jason Sherwood – assistant engineer
- Allen Sides – engineer
- Clifford Harris Jr. – featured artist
- Aubrey Graham – featured artist
- Tremaine Neverson – featured artist
- Allen Sodes – string engineer
- The Stereotypes – engineer
- Phil Tan – mixing
- Brian "B-Luv" Thomas – engineer
- Sam Thomas – engineer
- Pat Thrall – engineer
- Jenifer Tracy – design
- Pat Viola – vocal engineer
- Eric Weaver – assistant
- Frank Wolf – string engineer
- Andrew Wuepper – engineer

== Charts ==
=== Weekly charts ===
Weekly chart performance for Stronger with Each Tear
Chart (2009–10)	Peak position
Dutch Albums (Album Top 100)	89
Greek Albums (IFPI)	20
Italian Albums (FIMI)	18
Japanese Albums (Oricon)	30
Swedish Albums (Sverigetopplistan)	38
Swiss Albums (Schweizer Hitparade)	66
UK Albums (Official Charts)	33
UK R&B Albums (Official Charts)	4
US Billboard 200	2
US Top R&B/Hip-Hop Albums (Billboard)	1

=== Year-end charts ===
Year-end chart performance for Stronger with Each Tear
Chart (2010)	Position
US Billboard 200	24
US Top R&B/Hip-Hop Albums (Billboard)	9

== Certifications ==
Certifications and sales for Stronger with Each Tear
Region	Certification	Certified units/sales
United States (RIAA)	Gold	500,000^{^}
^{^} Shipments figures based on certification alone.

== Release history ==
=== Original release ===
Release history and formats for Stronger with Each Tear
Country	Date	Format	Label	Catalog
Australia	December 18, 2009	CD, digital download	Universal Music	2725654
Germany	December 18, 2009	CD, digital download	Universal Music	0602527256542
Italy	December 18, 2009	CD, digital download	Universal Music	060252725654
Greece	December 18, 2009	CD, digital download	Universal Music	060252725654
Sweden	December 18, 2009	CD, digital download	Universal Music	060252725654
Netherlands	December 18, 2009	CD, digital download	Universal Music	060252725654
Switzerland	December 18, 2009	CD, digital download	Universal Music	060252725654
France	December 21, 2009	CD, digital download	Barclay Records	060252725654
United States	December 21, 2009	CD, digital download	Matriarch Records	602527256542
Japan	December 23, 2009	CD	Universal Music	UICF9065
Korea	February 2, 2010	CD	Universal Music	DF6424
Brazil	February 2, 2010	Digital download	Universal Music	

=== Reissue release ===
Release history and formats for the reissu eof Stronger with Each Tear
Country	Date	Format	Label	Catalog
Germany	March 15, 2010	CD, digital download	Universal Music	060252731839
Italy	March 19, 2010	CD, digital download	Universal Music	060252731839
Greece	March 19, 2010	CD, digital download	Universal Music	060252731839
Sweden	March 19, 2010	CD, digital download	Universal Music	060252731839
Netherlands	March 19, 2010	CD, digital download	Universal Music	060252731839
Switzerland	March 19, 2010	CD, digital download	Universal Music	060252731839
United Kingdom	March 22, 2010	CD, digital download	Polydor Records	2725654
France	March 22, 2010	CD, digital download	Barclay Records	060252731839
Australia	March 23, 2010	International re-release	Universal Music	
Canada	April 13, 2010	CD, Digital download	Geffen Records	
razil	April 20, 2010	CD	Universal Music	602527318394
Australia	April 23, 2010	Australian re-release	Universal Music	2736019
Japan	May 12, 2010	CD, Digital download	Universal Music	UICF1125
