= More than a Game =

- Theatrical release poster
- Directed by: Kristopher Belman
- Written by: Kristopher Belman; Brad Hogan
- Produced by: Harvey Mason Jr. Kristopher Belman; Kevin Mann
- Starring: LeBron James; Dru Joyce III; Romeo Travis; Sian Cotton; Willie McGee; Dru Joyce II
- Edited by: Scott Balcerek
- Music by: Harvey Mason Jr.
- Distributed by: Lionsgate
- Release dates: September 6, 2008 (Toronto International Film Festival); October 2, 2009 (United States)
- Running time: 105 minutes
- Country: United States
- Language: English
- Box office: $960,387

More than a Game is a 2008 American documentary film that follows basketball superstar LeBron James and four of his teammates through the trials and tribulations of high school basketball in Akron, Ohio, and James's journey to fame. The film trailer was released featuring the single "Stronger" by Mary J. Blige, which she released in support of the film. The soundtrack titled Music Inspired by More than a Game was released September 28, 2009. The film had limited theatrical release on October 2, 2009.

== Synopsis ==
More than a Game is a documentary that focuses in on five young basketball players—LeBron James, Dru Joyce III, Romeo Travis, Sian Cotton, Willie McGee—and their coach, Dru Joyce II, performing on an AAU team with the growing stardom of the future NBA superstar, LeBron James. Taking them through their pre-teens to high school, this film follows their incredible journey as the unknown Ohio team rises to the top of youth athletics.

== Cast ==
- LeBron James as himself
- Dru Joyce III as himself
- Romeo Travis as himself
- Sian Cotton as himself
- Willie McGee as himself
- (Coach) Dru Joyce II as himself

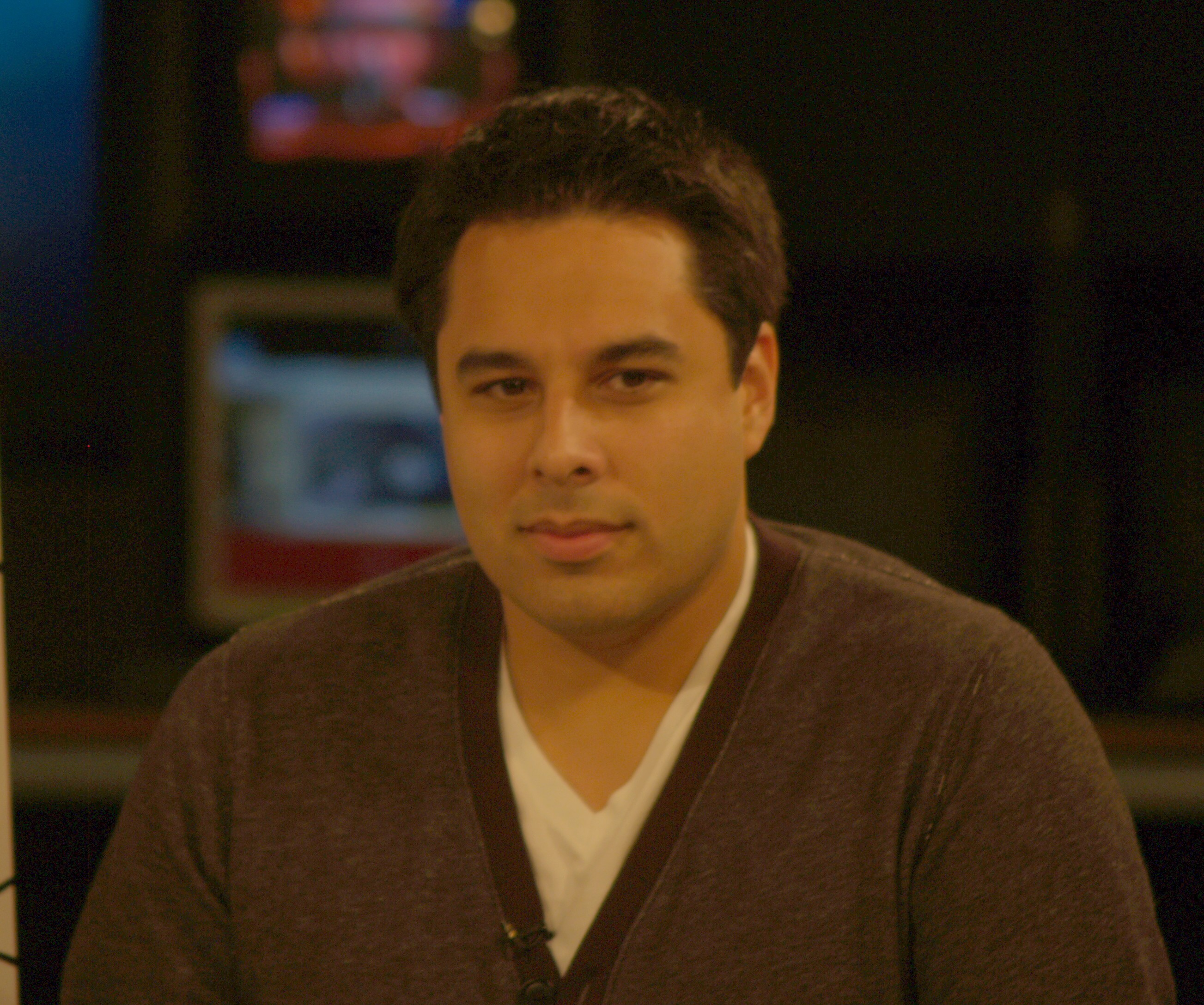
More than a Game director Kristopher Belman, 2009

== Soundtrack ==
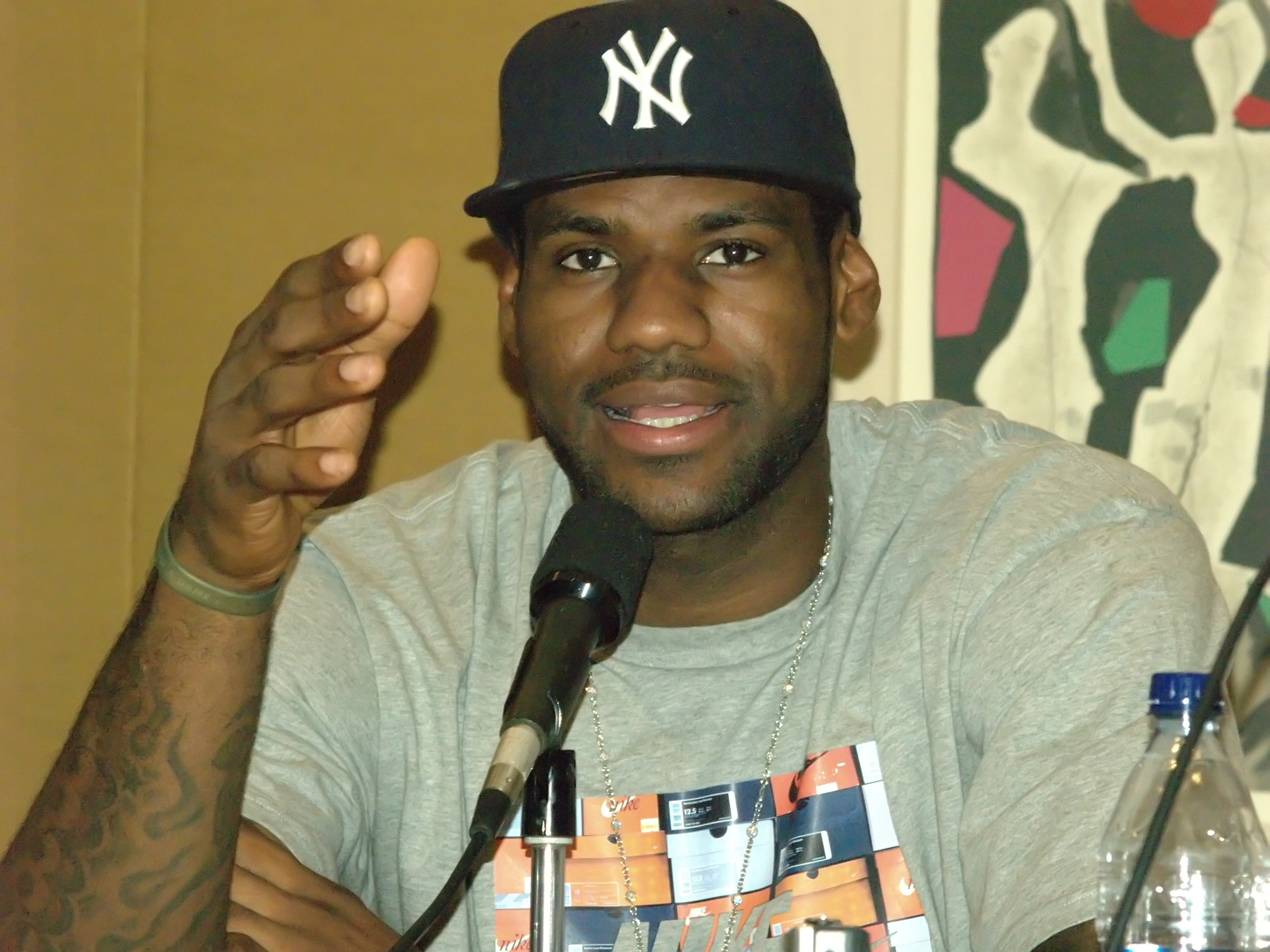
James at a press conference in New York City discussing the film

The music is mainly inspired by A. J. Mighton and John Colwill. An executive producer of the movie, Harvey Mason Jr., also is an executive producer of the soundtrack album, Music Inspired by More than a Game. The album was due for release on September 28, 2009, in the UK and September 29 in the US. Interscope is the main record label involved although Polow da Don's label Zone 4 inc/productions Mason's Harvey Mason Media the main production associates and publishers involved. Producers for the project include Boi-1da, Danielle Rayna, Polow da Don and Jerome Harmon amongst others.

The soundtrack features songs from Ester Dean, Drake, T.I., Mary J. Blige, Jay-Z, and Soulja Boy, amongst others. The album also features additional vocals or raps from Chris Brown, Kanye West, Lil Wayne, Eminem, Toni Braxton, JoJo, Jordin Sparks, Ya Boy, Omarion, and Faith Evans plus others. A number of songs were released as singles. First, "Stronger" by Mary J Blige is the soundtrack's lead single and was released on August 4, 2009, to support the film and later on August 21, 2009, as the second single from Blige's ninth studio album also titled Stronger with Each Tear. "Drop It Low" by Ester Dean (with Chris Brown) was released as a single on August 9, 2009, while "Forever" by Drake (featuring Kanye West, Lil Wayne, & Eminem) was released as a single on September 15, 2009.

== Reception ==
=== Box office ===
More than a Game opened with $182,943 in its first weekend and grossed a total of $960,387, $950,675 in the United States and Canada, and $9,712 worldwide.

=== Critical response ===
On the review aggregator Rotten Tomatoes, the film has an approval rating of 71%, based on 52 reviews, with an average rating of 6.4/10. The site's critical consensus reads, "Though the film may not delve as deep as some would prefer, More than a Game is an inspiring documentary featuring likable youngsters, a positive message, and some exciting in-game footage." On Metacritic, the film has a score of 59 out of 100, based on 18 reviews, indicating "mixed or average reviews".

== See also ==
- List of basketball films
