= Sanremo Music Festival 2010 =

Italian song contest (60th edition)

Dates and venue
- Semi-final 1: 16 February 2010
- Semi-final 2: 17 February 2010
- Semi-final 3: 18 February 2010
- Semi-final 4: 19 February 2010
- Final: 20 February 2010
- Venue: Teatro Ariston; Sanremo, Italy

Production
- Broadcaster: Radiotelevisione italiana (RAI)
- Director: Duccio Forzano
- Musical director: Marco Sabiu
- Artistic director: Gianmarco Mazzi
- Presenters: Antonella Clerici

Big Artists section
- Number of entries: 15
- Voting system: Mixed (televotes, jury and orchestra votes)
- Winner: "Per tutte le volte che..." Valerio Scanu

Newcomers' section
- Number of entries: 10
- Voting system: Mixed (televotes, orchestra votes)
- Winner: "Il linguaggio della resa" Tony Maiello

The Sanremo Music Festival 2010 (Italian: Festival di Sanremo 2010), officially the 60th Italian Song Festival (60º Festival della canzone italiana), was the 60th annual Sanremo Music Festival, held at the Teatro Ariston in Sanremo between 16 February 2010 and 20 February 2010 and broadcast by Radiotelevisione italiana (RAI). The show was presented by Antonella Clerici, while the artistic director was Gianmarco Mazzi.

As in most of the previous years, the competition was divided in two sections. The Big Artists section, including 15 established Italian artists, was won by Valerio Scanu with the song "Per tutte le volte che...", while the Newcomers section was won by Tony Maiello with "Il linguaggio della resa". For the first time, the rules of the festival were modified so that songs with lyrics in an Italian regional language or written by non-Italian writers were allowed to compete in the festival. Moreover, the songs performed by the artists competing in the Newcomers' section were allowed to be released before the festival's first night.

== Presenters and personnel ==
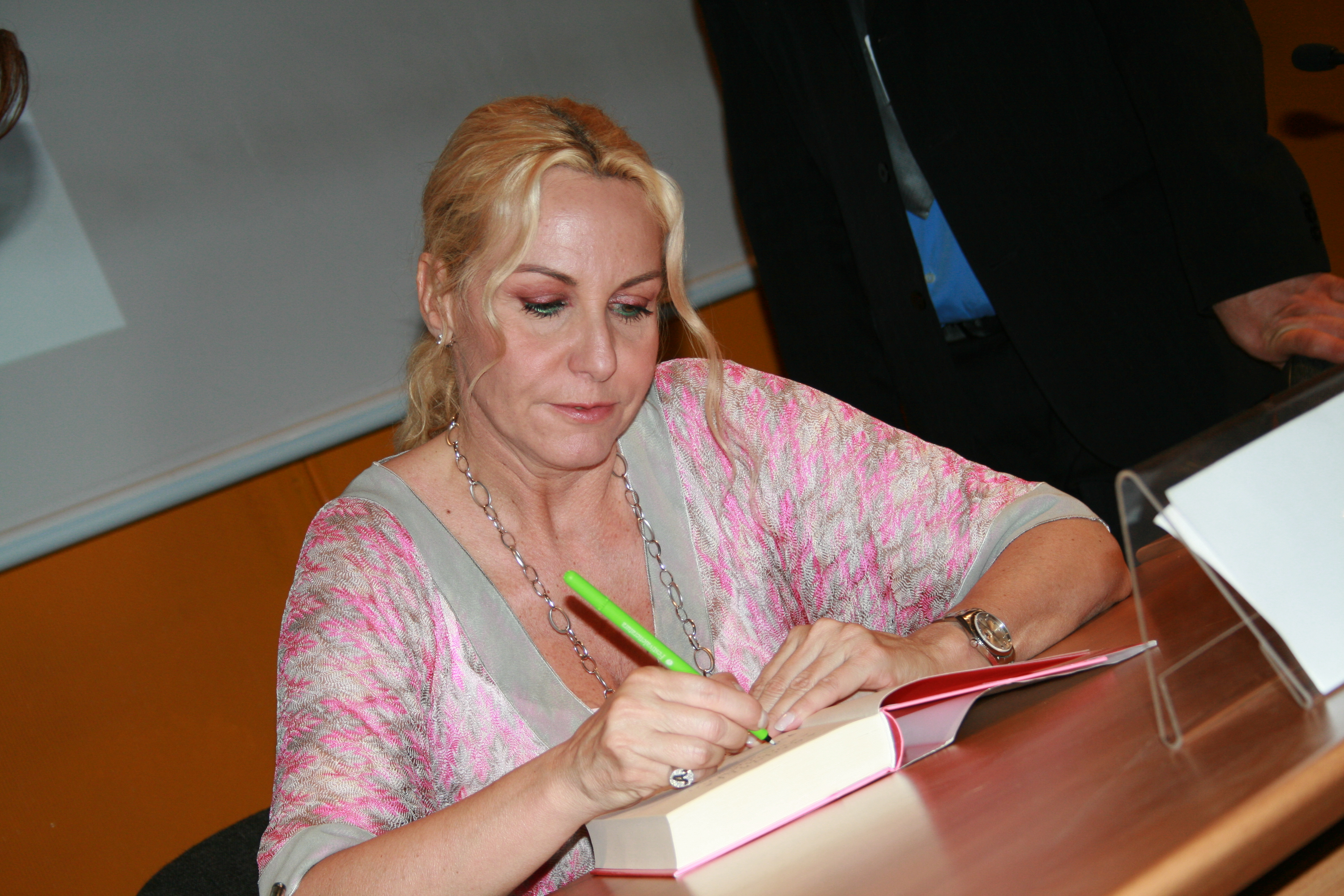
Antonella Clerici, presenter of the show.

On 2 September 2009, Antonella Clerici was officially announced as the presenter of the Sanremo Music Festival 2010, while Gianmarco Mazzi was confirmed as the artistic and musical director of the show. Rumours about Clerici's involvement in the show started in June 2009. It was the second Sanremo Music Festival presented by Antonella Clerici, after 2005's edition, presented alongside Paolo Bonolis.

The authors of the show were Ivano Balduini, Matteo Catalano, Massimo Cotto, Simona Ercolani, Cesare Lanza, Andrea Lo Vecchio, Luca Parenti and Francesco Valitutti. The Sanremo Festival Orchestra was conducted by Marco Sabiu, while Daniel Ezralow was for the first time the choreographer of the show.

For the seventeenth time, the scenography was created by Gaetano Castelli.

== Selections ==
=== Newcomers section ===
==== SanremoLab ====
The artists competing in the newcomers section were chosen through the contests SanremoLab and Sanremo New Generation. The selection for the contest SanremoLab, organized by the Comune di Sanremo, took place between October and December 2009. 312 artists participated in the selections, and the 8 finalists of the contest—Divario, Davide Fasulo, Giops, Maya, Erika Mineo, Jacopo Ratini, Romeus and Donato Santoianni—were chosen on 12 December 2009 by a jury presided by music journalist Paolo Giordano and including Francesco Mandelli, Bruno Santori, Nicoletta Deponti, Luigi Grasso, Federica Gentile and Elena Di Cioccio. A few hours later, Jacopo Ratini and Romeus, performing "Su questa panchina" and "Come l'autunno" respectively, were chosen by the SanremoAcademy jury and announced as the two winners of the contest, becoming the first two confirmed artists competing in the newcomers section of the Sanremo Music Festival 2012.

==== Sanremo New Generation ====
The contest Sanremo New Generation was organized by RAI, and it was held between December 2009 and January 2010. The 988 songs competing in the contest were published on the Sanremo Music Festival official website on 3 December 2009. A jury, composed of Massimo Cotto, Gigio D'Ambrosio, Andrea Lo Vecchio and Mariolina Simone later selected the 8 winning acts, chosen as the last performers competing in the newcomers section of the Sanremo Music Festival 2010. The winners of the contest—Tony Maiello, Nina Zilli, Nicolas Bonazzi, Jessica Brando, Broken Heart College, Mattia De Luca, La Fame di Camilla and Luca Marino—were announced on 12 January 2010, through the Sanremo Music Festival official website.

=== Big Artists section ===
One of the acts competing in the Big Artists section was selected through the third series of X Factor. The final of the talent show took place on 2 December 2009, and Marco Mengoni was announced the winner, becoming the first confirmed artist competing in the Sanremo Music Festival 2010. The remaining artists were selected through an internal selection. The complete list of the artists participating in the Big Artists section of the Sanremo Music Festival 2010 was announced on 18 December 2009. Alongside Mengoni, the list included Arisa, Malika Ayane, Simone Cristicchi, Toto Cutugno, Nino D'Angelo, Irene Grandi, Morgan, Fabrizio Moro, Irene Fornaciari with Nomadi, Noemi, Povia, the trio composed of Pupo, Emanuele Filiberto and Luca Canonici, Enrico Ruggeri, Valerio Scanu and Sonohra.

However, in early February 2010, Morgan was ejected from the competition, following an interview released to the Italian magazine Max, in which he admitted that he had used drugs as an antidepressant. Morgan was not replaced by any other artist, therefore the number of contestants was reduced to fifteen.

== Shows ==
=== First night ===
==== Big Artists section ====
During the first night, each act in the "Big Artists Section" performed for the first time the competing song. Immediately after the performance, each song was ranked by a jury composed of 300 people between the age of 16 and 85 years, selected by Ipsos among music listeners. At the end of the night, the three songs receiving the lowest points—Toto Cutugno's "Aeroplani", Nino D'Angelo's "Jammo jà" and "Italia amore mio" by Pupo, Emanuele Filiberto and Luca Canonici—were eliminated from the competition.

Performances of the contestants of the Big Artists section on the first night
R/O	Artist	Song	Writer(s)	Result
1	Irene Grandi	"La cometa di Halley"	Francesco Bianconi, Irene Grandi	Safe
2	Valerio Scanu	"Per tutte le volte che..."	Pierdavide Carone	Safe
3	Toto Cutugno	"Aeroplani"	Toto Cutugno, Claudio Romano, Sergio Iodice	Eliminated
4	Arisa with Sorelle Marinetti	"Malamorenò"	Giuseppe Anastasi	Safe
5	Nino D'Angelo with Maria Nazionale	"Jammo jà"	Nino D'Angelo	Eliminated
6	Marco Mengoni	"Credimi ancora"	Marco Mengoni, Stella Fabiani, Piero Calabrese, Massimo Calabrese	Safe
7	Simone Cristicchi	"Meno male"	Simone Cristicchi, Frankie Hi-NRG MC, Elia Marcelli, Alessandro Canini	Safe
8	Malika Ayane	"Ricomincio da qui"	Malika Ayane, Pacifico, Ferdinando Arnò	Safe
9	Pupo, Emanuele Filiberto and Luca Canonici	"Italia amore mio"	Pupo, Emanuele Filiberto	Eliminated
10	Enrico Ruggeri	"La notte delle fate"	Enrico Ruggeri	Safe
11	Sonohra	"Baby"	Roberto Tini, Diego Fainello	Safe
12	Povia	"La verità"	Povia	Safe
13	Irene Fornaciari with Nomadi	"Il mondo piange"	Zucchero Fornaciari, Damiano Dattoli, Irene Fornaciari	Safe
14	Noemi	"Per tutta la vita"	Diego Calvetti, Marco Ciappelli	Safe
15	Fabrizio Moro	"Non è una canzone"	Fabrizio Moro	Safe

==== Guests and other performances ====
- Paolo Bonolis and Luca Laurenti opened the show, presenting the first part of the night and performing a comic piece. Laurenti also performed the song "Crazy Little Thing Called Love".
- Italian football player Antonio Cassano was interviewed by Antonella Clerici during the first night of the show.
- British singer Susan Boyle performed the song "I Dreamed a Dream" from the musical Les Misérables.
- American burlesque dancer Dita Von Teese performed her signature number, dancing in a giant champagne glass.

=== Second night ===
==== Big Artists section ====
On 17 February 2010, the acts in the Big Artists section that were not eliminated during the first night performed for the second time the competing song. As in the first night, the songs were ranked by a jury of 300 people selected by Ipsos. Valerio Scanu's "Per tutte le volte che" and Sonohra's "Baby" were the two songs receiving the lowest votes, therefore they were eliminated from the competition.

Performances of the contestants of the Big Artists section on the second night
R/O	Artist	Song	Result
1	Povia	"La verità"	Safe
2	Noemi	"Per tutta la vita"	Safe
3	Enrico Ruggeri	"La notte delle fate"	Safe
4	Fabrizio Moro	"Non è una canzone"	Safe
5	Malika Ayane	"Ricomincio da qui"	Safe
6	Irene Fornaciari with Nomadi	"Il mondo piange"	Safe
7	Sonohra	"Baby"	Eliminated
8	Irene Grandi	"La cometa di Halley"	Safe
9	Valerio Scanu	"Per tutte le volte che..."	Eliminated
10	Simone Cristicchi	"Meno male"	Safe
11	Marco Mengoni	"Credimi ancora"	Safe
12	Arisa	"Malamorenò"	Safe

==== Newcomers section ====
At the end of the second night, the first five acts in the newcomers section performed their entries. A ranking was compiled, based on televoting and on the votes that each artist received by the Sanremo Festival Orchestra musicians. Only the two songs receiving the most votes—"L'uomo che amava le donne" by Nina Zilli and "Non mi dai pace" by Luca Marino—were admitted to the final of the newcomers section, held on 19 February 2010.

Performances of the contestants of the Newcomers section on the second night
R/O	Artist	Song	Result
1	Nina Zilli	"L'uomo che amava le donne"	Safe
2	Broken Heart College	"Mesi"	Eliminated
3	Mattia De Luca	"Non parlare più"	Eliminated
4	Jacopo Ratini^{1}	"Su questa panchina"	Eliminated
5	Luca Marino	"Non mi dai pace"	Safe

Notes

- ^1 In the beginning, it was announced that Romeus would have performed during the night but he was replaced at the last moment by Jacopo Ratini, following a protest by recording label Sugar Music, asking to allow to its two artists—Romeus and Mattia De Luca—to perform during two different nights.

==== Guests and other performances ====
- Sixteen dancers from the popular French cabaret Moulin Rouge opened the show, introduced by Daniel Ezralow. They later danced the can-can, together with presenter Antonella Clerici.
- Queen Rania of Jordan was interviewed by Antonella Clerici.
- Italian popera singers Piero Barone, Ignazio Boschetto and Gianluca Ginoble performed the song "'O Sole Mio" in front of Queen Rania of Jordan. They also performed the popular Mexican song "Granada" and Claudio Villa's "Un amore così grande".
- The last guest of the night was American actress Michelle Rodriguez, interviewed by Antonella Clerici. During the interview, some scenes from James Cameron's film Avatar were shown.

=== Third night ===
==== Repechage round ====
During the third night, the five acts eliminated during the previous nights performed again their entries, dueting with a guest artist. Each artist was voted by the musicians of the Sanremo Festival Orchestra, and the result was combined with televoting. The top two artists, Valerio Scanu and the trio composed of Pupo, Emanuele Filiberto and Luca Canonici, were reinstated in the competition.

Performances of the eliminated "Big Artists"
R/O	Artist	Song	Guest artist	Result
1	Toto Cutugno	"Aeroplani"	Belén Rodríguez	Eliminated
2	Pupo, Emanuele Filiberto and Luca Canonici	"Italia amore mio"	Divas	Back in competition
3	Valerio Scanu	"Per tutte le volte che..."	Alessandra Amoroso	Back in competition
4	Sonohra	"Baby"	Dodi Battaglia	Eliminated
5	Nino D'Angelo with Maria Nazionale	"Jammo jà"	Ambrogio Sparagna & Le Voci del Sud	Eliminated

==== Guests and other performances ====
After the repechage round, the 60th edition of the Sanremo Music Festival was celebrated by several guests, performing popular songs which competed in the contests held during the previous year. This part of the night was titled Quando la musica diventa leggenda (English: When music becomes legendary).

- Elisa performed her hit "Luce (Tramonti a nord est)", which won the Sanremo Music Festival 2001, and Sergio Endrigo's "Canzone per te", originally performed during the Sanremo Music Festival 1968. She also performed a medley of the songs "Ti vorrei sollevare", "Anche se non trovi le parole" and "Your Manifesto", included in her 2009's album Heart.
- Fiorella Mannoia covered "E se domani", originally performed by Fausto Cigliano and Gene Pitney during the Sanremo Music Festival 1964, but better known for the version released by Mina soon after the end of the contest. She later performed Negramaro's "Estate", also included in her album Ho imparato a sognare.
- Miguel Bosé covered "Non ho l'età", the song winning the Sanremo Music Festival 1964 and originally performed by Gigliola Cinquetti. Bosé also presented his new single "Por tì", from the album Cardio.
- Edoardo Bennato performed Luigi Tenco's "Ciao amore ciao", presented during the Sanremo Music Festival 1967. He later sang a medley including three of his hits, "Un giorno credi", "Il rock del Capitan Uncino" and "È lei".
- Massimo Ranieri sang "Io che non vivo (senza te)", performed by Pino Donaggio during the Sanremo Music Festival 1965, and "Perdere l'amore", the song with which Ranieri won the Sanremo Music Festival 19880.
- After performing her single "Mandami una cartolina", Carmen Consoli performed Nilla Pizzi's "Grazie dei fiori", the song winning the first Sanremo Music Festival in 1951. Pizzi joined Consoli on stage, and she performed her 1952's entry "Vola colomba", which won first place during the second Sanremo Music Festival.
- Riccardo Cocciante performed Modugno's 1958 winning entry, "Nel blu dipinto di blu", his song "Se stiamo insieme", which won the Sanremo Music Festival 1991, and some tracks from the soundtrack of his musical Giulietta e Romeo.
- Francesco Renga performed the song "La voce del silenzio", presented by Tony Del Monaco and Dionne Warwick during the Sanremo Music Festival 1968, "L'immensità" by Don Backy and Johnny Dorelli, competing in the Sanremo Music Festival 1967, and his 2005's winning entry "Angelo".
- Fiorella Mannoia and Elisa came back on stage, performing together "Almeno tu nell'universo" by Mia Martini. The song was performed for the first time during the Sanremo Music Festival 1989.

==== Newcomers section ====
At the end of the night, the last five newcomers performed their entries. After being voted by the Sanremo Music Festival, the results were combined with televoting, and the bottom three artists were eliminated from the competition. The eliminated acts were Nicolas Bonazzi, La Fame di Camilla and Romeus.

Performances of the contestants of the Newcomers section on the third night
R/O	Artist	Song	Result
1	Jessica Brando^{1}	"Dove non ci sono ore"	Safe
2	Nicolas Bonazzi	"Dirsi che è normale"	Eliminated
3	La Fame di Camilla	"Buio e luce"	Eliminated
4	Tony Maiello	"Il linguaggio della resa"	Safe
5	Romeus	"Come l'autunno"	Eliminated

Notes

- ^1 Fifteen years-old singer Jessica Brando could not perform live during the night, since the performances by the guest artists ended later than scheduled, and it is forbidden for people under the age of 18 to perform live during a TV show after midnight. For that reason, Brando's performance was replaced by a clip, recorded during the rehearsal of the show, in which she sang her entry.

=== Fourth night ===
==== Big artists section ====
During the fourth night, each one of the artists still in competition performed the competing song together with one or more guests. A ranking was compiled, based on televoting and on the preferences expressed by the Sanremo Festival Orchestra, and the ten artists receiving the most votes were admitted to the final of the show, held on 20 February 2010. The eliminated artists were Enrico Ruggeri, performing "La notte delle fate", and Fabrizio Moro, singing "Non è una canzone".

Performances of the contestants of the Big Artists section on the fourth night
R/O	Artist	Song	Guest artist	Result
1	Malika Ayane	"Ricomincio da qui"	Sabrina Brazzi	Safe
2	Simone Cristicchi	"Meno male"	Coro dei Minatori di Santa Fiora	Safe
3	Irene Grandi	"La cometa di Halley"	Marco Cocci	Safe
4	Irene Fornaciari with Nomadi	"Il mondo piange"	Mousse T. & Susie	Safe
5	Marco Mengoni	"Credimi ancora"	Solis String Quartet	Safe
6	Pupo, Emanele Filiberto and Luca Canonici	"Italia amore mio"	Divas & Marcello Lippi	Safe
7	Valerio Scanu	"Per tutte le volte che..."	Alessandra Amoroso	Safe
8	Arisa	"Malamorenò"	Lino Patruno Jazz Band	Safe
9	Enrico Ruggeri	"La notte delle fate"	Decibel	Eliminated
10	Noemi	"Per tutta la vita"	Kataklò Dancer	Safe
11	Fabrizio Moro	"Non è una canzone"	Jarabe de Palo	Eliminated
12	Povia	"La verità"	Marco Masini	Safe

==== Newcomers section ====
At the end of the night, the four finalists in the newcomers section performed their entries for the last time, and the final ranking was compiled, by combining the votes expressed by the Sanremo Festival Orchestra with televoting. Tony Maiello's "Il linguaggio della resa" was declared the winner.

Performances of the contestants of the Newcomers section on the fourth night
R/O	Artist	Song	Result
1	Jessica Brando	"Dove non ci sono ore"	——
2	Tony Maiello	"Il linguaggio della resa"	Winner
3	Luca Marino	"Non mi dai pace"	——
4	Nina Zilli	"L'uomo che amava le donne"	——

==== Guests and other performances ====
- French DJ Bob Sinclar opened the night, performing with Steve Edwards the hit single "World, Hold On (Children of the Sky)".
- American singer Jennifer Lopez, after performing her song "(What Is) Love?", was interviewed by Antonella Clerici.
- Italian comedian Giovanni Vernia played his character Johnny Groove during the night.
- Actress Cristiana Capotondi was interviewed during the night, promoting the TV series Sisi.
- At the end of the night, German pop rock band Tokio Hotel performed the song "World Behind My Wall".

=== Fifth night ===
==== First round ====
During the fifth night, the competition involved the Big Artists section only. The ten remaining songs were performed and, after being voted by the Sanremo Festival Orchestra, the results were combined with televoting, determining the three artists competing in the second round. The top three artists were Marco Mengoni, Valerio Scanu and the trio composed of Pupo, Emanuele Filiberto and Luca Canonici.

Performances of the "Big Artists" on the first round of the final
R/O	Artist	Song	Result
1	Valerio Scanu	"Per tutte le volte che..."	Finalist
2	Noemi	"Per tutta la vita"	Eliminated
3	Marco Mengoni	"Credimi ancora"	Finalist
4	Povia	"La verità"	Eliminated
5	Malika Ayane	"Ricomincio da qui"	Eliminated
6	Irene Grandi	"La cometa di Halley"	Eliminated
7	Pupo, Emanuele Filiberto and Luca Canonici	"Italia amore mio"	Finalist
8	Irene Fornaciari with Nomadi	"Il mondo piange"	Eliminated
9	Simone Cristicchi	"Meno male"	Eliminated
10	Arisa	"Malamorenò"	Eliminated

==== Second round ====
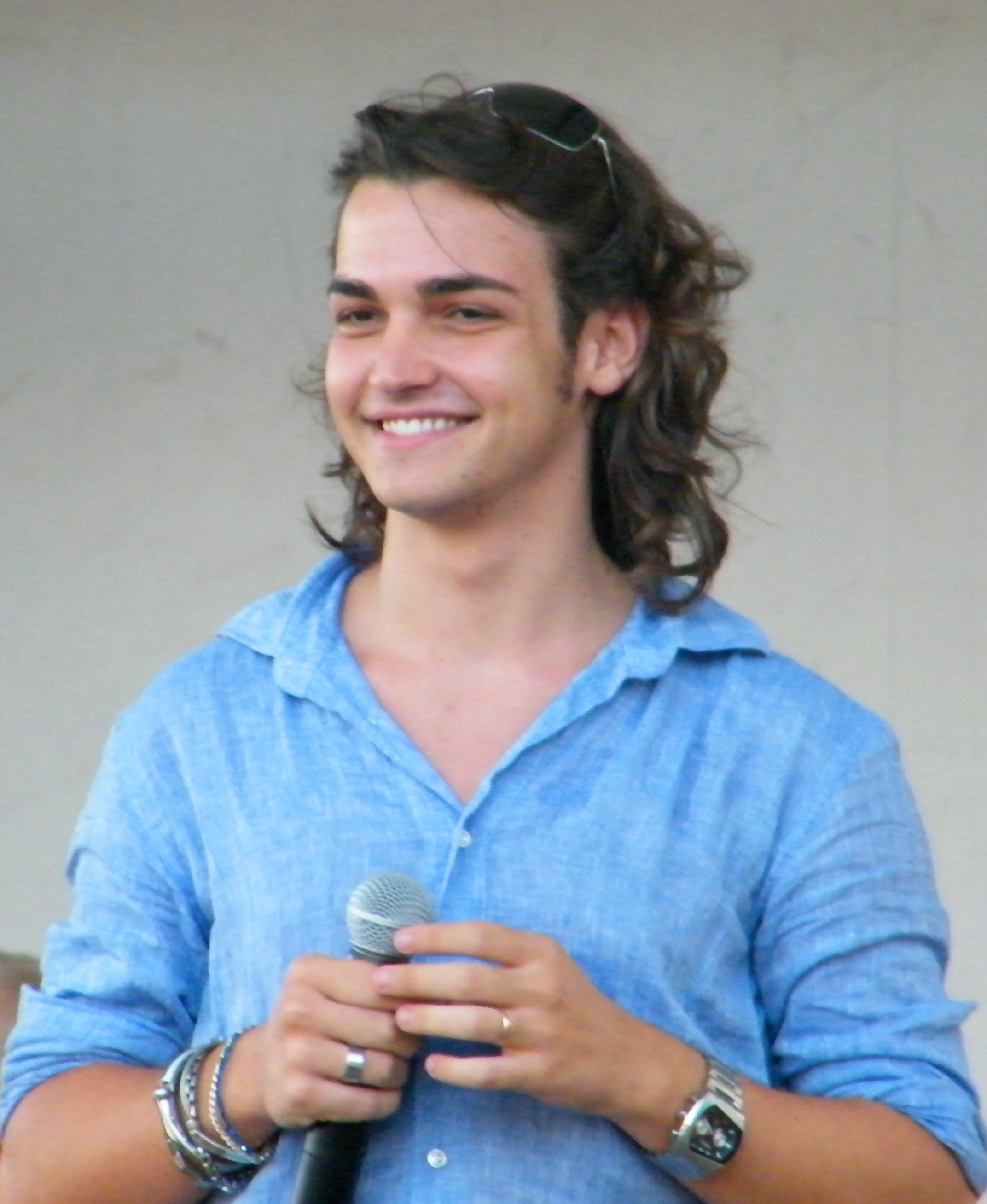
Valerio Scanu was the winner of the Sanremo Music Festival 2010, performing "Per tutte le volte che...".

At the end of the night, the top three contestants performed for the last time their entries, and televoting determined the winner of the Sanremo Music Festival. The song receiving the most votes was "Per tutte le volte che..." by Valerio Scanu.

Performances of the "Big Artists" on the second round of the final
R/O	Artist	Song	Result
1	Marco Mengoni	"Credimi ancora"	Third place
2	Valerio Scanu	"Per tutte le volte che..."	Winner
3	Pupo, Emanuele Filiberto and Luca Canonici	"Italia amore mio"	Second place

==== Guests and other performances ====
- Actor Emilio Solfrizzi appeared during the night, dancing to the song "Shava Shava" and promoting the Italian series Tutti pazzi per amore.
- The dancers who were supposed to appear in Michael Jackson's This Is It concerts starting from July 2009 performed a number during the show, dancing to a medley including some of Jackson's most popular songs. The choreographer Travis Payne was later interviewed by Antonella Clerici.
- Italian showgirl Lorella Cuccarini performed a choreography from the musical Il pianeta proibito by Luca Tommassini.
- Some of the singers competing in the previous series of the talent show Ti lascio una canzone covered a few popular Italian song.
- Mary J. Blige performed her single "Each Tear". Clerici revealed that she was supposed to duet with Italian singer Tiziano Ferro, but his appearance was canceled following a laryngitis.
- Italian TV presenter Maurizio Costanzo appeared during the night, talking about current occupation problems in Italy and interviewing three employers working at Fiat's manufacturing facility in Termini Imerese. He also briefly interviewed politicians Pierluigi Bersani and Claudio Scajola, who were sitting in the audience.
- Tony Maiello, who was declared the winner of the newcomers section during the previous night, performed again his entry, "Il linguaggio della resa".

== Other awards ==
=== Critics Award "Mia Martini" ===
==== Big Artists section ====
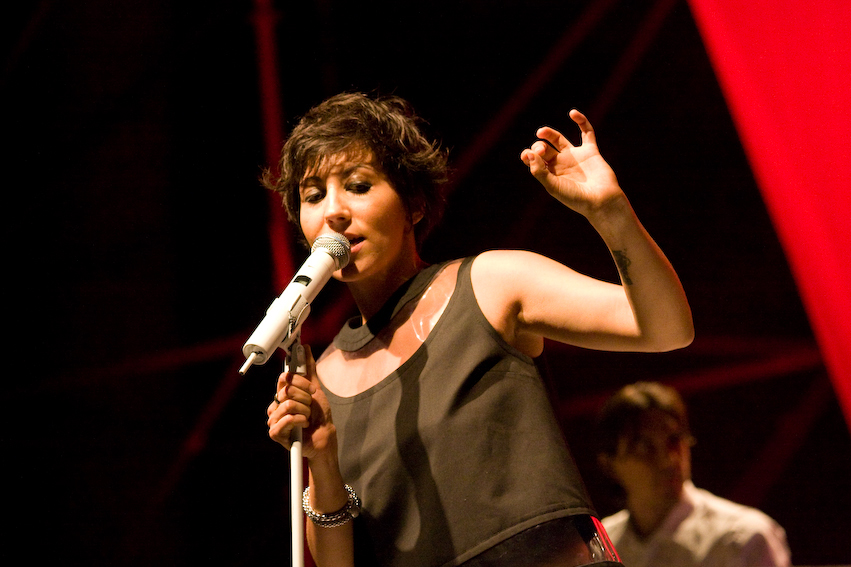
Malika Ayane was the winner of the Critics Award "Mia Martini" in the "Big Artists" section.

Points received by the Big Artists for the Critics Award
Artist	Song	Points	Result
Malika Ayane	"Ricomincio da qui"	58	Winner
Simone Cristicchi	"Meno male"	12	Second place
Arisa	"Malamorenò"	6	Third place
Irene Grandi	"La cometa di Halley"	6	Third place
Marco Mengoni	"Credimi ancora"	6	Third place
Nino D'Angelo	"Jammo jà"	6	Third place
Enrico Ruggeri	"La notte delle fate"	2	Seventh place
Irene Fornaciari with Nomadi	"Il mondo piange"	2	Seventh place
Noemi	"Per tutta la vita"	2	Seventh place
Fabrizio Moro	"Non è una canzone"	1	Tenth place
Povia	"La verità"	1	Tenth place
Sonohra	"Baby"	1	Tenth place
Valerio Scanu	"Per tutte le volte che..."	1	Tenth place
Pupo, Emanuele Filiberto and Luca Canonici	"Italia amore mio"	1	Tenth place

==== Newcomers section ====
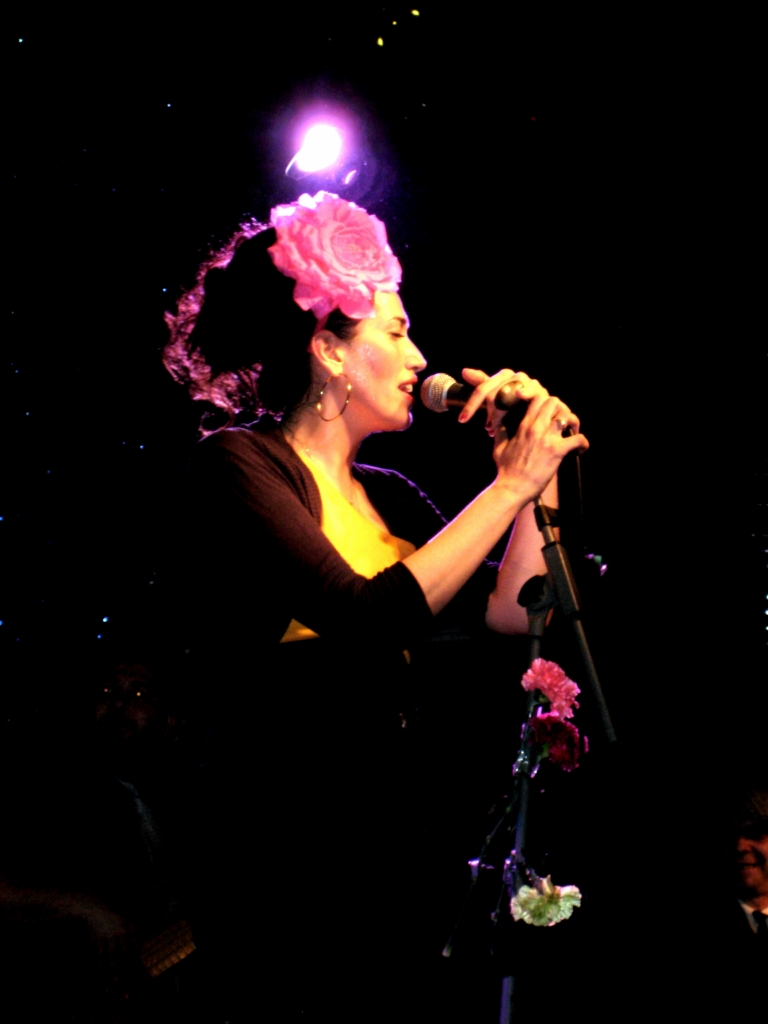
Nina Zilli received the Critics Award "Mia Martini" in the newcomers' section.

Points received by the newcomers for the Critics Award
Artist	Song	Points	Result
Nina Zilli	"L'uomo che amava le donne"	48	Winner
La Fame di Camilla	"Buio e luce"	14	Second place
Tony Maiello	"Il linguaggio della resa"	11	Third place
Jessica Brando	"Dove non ci sono ore"	11	Third place
Luca Marino	"Non mi dai pace"	7	Fifth place
Romeus	"Come l'autunno"	5	Sixth place
Nicolas Bonazzi	"Dirsi che è normale"	2	Seventh place
Jacopo Ratini	"Su questa panchina"	2	Seventh place
Mattia De Luca	"Non parlare più"	1	Ninth place
Broken Heart College	"Mesi"	1	Ninth place

=== Press, Radio & TV Award ===
==== Big Artists section ====
Points received by the Big Artists for the Press, Radio & TV Award
Artist	Song	Points	Result
Malika Ayane	"Ricomincio da qui"	10	Winner
Simone Cristicchi	"Meno male"	7	Second place
Arisa	"Malamorenò"	6	Third place
Irene Grandi	"La cometa di Halley"	6	Third place
Povia	"La verità"	6	Third place
Fabrizio Moro	"Non è una canzone"	3	Sixth place
Marco Mengoni	"Credimi ancora"	3	Sixth place
Enrico Ruggeri	"La notte delle fate"	2	Eighth place
Valerio Scanu	"Per tutte le volte che..."	2	Eighth place
Toto Cutugno	"Aeroplani"	1	Tenth place
Nino D'Angelo	"Jammo jà"	1	Tenth place
Irene Fornaciari with Nomadi	"Il mondo piange"	1	Tenth place
Noemi	"Per tutta la vita"	1	Tenth place

==== Newcomers section ====
Points received by the newcomers for the Press, Radio & TV Award
Artist	Song	Points	Result
Nina Zilli	"L'uomo che amava le donne"	15	Winner
Jessica Brando	"Dove non ci sono ore"	9	Second place
La Fame di Camilla	"Buio e luce"	8	Third place
Tony Maiello	"Il linguaggio della resa"	8	Third place
Romeus	"Come l'autunno"	4	Fifth place
Luca Marino	"Non mi dai pace"	3	Sixth place
Nicolas Bonazzi	"Dirsi che è normale"	1	Eight place
Mattia De Luca	"Non parlare più"	1	Eight place
Jacopo Ratini	"Su questa panchina"	1	Eight place

== Controversy ==
At the end of the first round of the final, when the top three artists were revealed, the musicians of the Sanremo Festival Orchestra, who contributed determining the final ranking, protested against the announced result, throwing their sheet music on stage. Particularly, they booed when it was announced that Malika Ayane's song "Ricomincio da qui" was not admitted to the second round of the competition. The protest was also supported by most of the journalists attending the event. Orchestra conductor Marco Sabiu explained that their votes were completely different from the final outcome of the competition, which was strongly changed by televoting, and he asked that the detailed results, including the ranking determined by the Sanremo Festival Orchestra only, were released. Artistic director Gianmarco Mazzi refused to do so, claiming that, according to the rules of the 2010s contest, partial rankings were not supposed to be revealed. For that reason, the detailed results were never revealed by RAI. Mazzi later criticized televoting as a mechanism for determining the winner of the contest, but also explained that he expected more responsible behavior from the musicians of the Sanremo Festival Orchestra.

On 22 February 2010, Enzo Mazza, chairman of the Federation of the Italian Music Industry, praised the protest by the musicians of the Sanremo Festival Orchestra, claiming that "it gave back dignity to the Italian music industry, which is used to be subject to everything".

During the TV show Striscia la notizia, a call center worker claimed that one of the contestants of the Sanremo Music Festival 2010 bought votes to gain positions in the final ranking.

== Ratings ==
Episode	Date	Viewers	Share
Night 1	16 February 2010	10,717,000	45.29%
Night 2	17 February 2010	10,163,000	43.88%
Night 3	18 February 2010	10,005,000	46.00%
Night 4	19 February 2010	11,274,000	50.74%
Night 5	20 February 2010	12,462,000	53.21%

== Broadcasts ==
=== International broadcasts ===
Known details on the broadcasts in each country, including the specific broadcasting stations and commentators are shown in the tables below.

International broadcasters of the Sanremo Music Festival 2010
Country	Broadcaster	Channel(s)	Commentator(s)	Ref(s)
Australia	SBS	SBS ONE (Note: Delayed broadcast every Saturday since 19 June through 17 July at 13:00 (AEST))		
