= Valerio Scanu Live in Roma =

Valerio Scanu Live in Rome (Ltd Ed.)

Live album / DVD by Valerio Scanu
- Released: 11 June 2013
- Genre: Pop
- Length: CD 1:21:00 DVD 2:07:55
- Language: Italian, English
- Label: NatyLoveYou srl
- Producer: Valerio Scanu

Valerio Scanu chronology
Così diverso (2012)	Valerio Scanu Live in Rome (Ltd Ed.) (2013)

Valerio Scanu Live in Roma is a limited edition CD and DVD album by the Italian singer Valerio Scanu. It was released on June 11, 2013. The album was recorded live. The album is a recording of a December 17, 2012, Christmas concert at the Auditorium Parco della Musica in Sala Sinopoli, Rome.

During the concert, Scanu sang songs from his own albums, and cover versions, mostly in English. He also performed two duets with singers Ivana Spagna and Silvia Olari. The project was funded and organized by Scanu and by the publishing house he had recently founded, "NatyLoveYou", which became his official publishing house after a break-up with his former publisher. The project was distributed through Self Distribuzione, the largest independent distributor of Italian recordings.

== Track list of CD ==
No.	Title	Lyrics	Music	Album	Length
1.	"My Heart Will Go On"	Will Jennings	James Horner	cover — Céline Dion	00:07.16
2.	"One Moment In Time"	Albert Hammond	John Bettis	cover — Whitney Houston	00:04:53
3.	"I Surrender"	John Louis Biancaniello	Samuel J. Watters	cover — Celine Dion	00:05:22
4.	"Listen"	Anne Preven	Scott Cutler	cover – Beyoncé Knowles	00:03:15
5.	"Sentimento"	Alessandra Dini	Andrea Del Principe	Album – Sentimento	00:05:02
6.	"Ricordati Di Noi"	Antonio Calo, Saverio Grandi	Antonio Calo, Saverio Grandi	Album – Valerio Scanu	00:02:27
7.	"Domani, Esisti Tu, Libero"	Federica Camba, Alan Sorrenti	Coro Daniele, Matteo Saggese, Luca Mattioni	Album – Sentimento, Valerio Scanu, Parto Da Qui	00:04:57
8.	"Dicitencelo Vuje"	Enzo Fusco	Rodolfo Falvo	cover – Rodolfo Falvo, Enzo Fusco	00:02:28
9.	"Someone Like You / Total Eclipse of the Heart / Pride"	Jim Steinman, Adele Laurie, Blue Adkins, Paul David Hewson, Larry Muller, Adam Clayton	Daniel Dodd Wilson, Jim Steinman, Dave Evans, U2	cover – Adele, Bonnie Tyler, U2	00:07:26
10.	"All by Myself"	Eric Carmen	Eric Carmen	cover – Eric Carmen	00:04:03
11.	"Il cerchio della vita" (feat. Ivana Spagna)	Tim Rice	Elton John	cover – Ivana Spagna	00:06:58
12.	"Silent Night"	Joseph Mohr	Franz Xaver Gruber	cover – Christmas carol	00:04:00
13.	"Happy Xmas"	John Lennon	Yoko Ono	cover – John & Yoko/Plastic Ono Band	00:04:36
14.	"Oh Holy Night"	Jonh Dwight Sullivan	Frank Zueckmantel, A. Adam	cover – Christmas carol	00:04:37
15.	"Santa Claus Is Coming to Town"	Haven Gillespie	J. Fred Coots	cover – Christmas song	00:03:02
16.	"Oh Happy Day"	Edwin R. Hawkins	DP	cover – Gospel Hymn	00:06.22
17.	"Beauty And The Beast" (feat. Silvia Olari)	Howard Elliot Ashman	Alan Menken	cover – Disney Theme Song	00:04.16

== Track list of DVD ==
No.	Title	Lyrics	Music	Album	Length
1.	"My Heart Will Go On"	Will Jennings	James Horner	cover – Céline Dion
2.	"One Moment In Time"			cover – Whitney Houston
3.	"Cambiare"			cover – Alex Baroni
4.	"Gli Occhi Negli Occhi"			cover – Riccardo Cocciante
5.	"I Surrender"	John Louis Biancaniello	Samuel J. Watters	cover – Celine Dion
6.	"Listen"	Anne Preven	Scott Cutler	cover – Beyoncé Knowles
7.	"Sentimento"			Album – Sentimento
8.	"Ricordati Di Noi"	Antonio Calo, Saverio Grandi	Antonio Calo, Saverio Grandi	Album – Valerio Scanu
9.	"Domani, Esisti Tu, Libero"	Federica Camba, Alan Sorrenti	Coro Daniele, Matteo Saggese, Luca Mattioni	Album – Sentimento, Valerio Scanu, Parto Da Qui
10.	"Per Tutte Le Volte Che"	Enzo Fusco	Rodolfo Falvo	Album – Per Tutte Le Volte Che...
11.	"Libera Mente / La Mia Coperta Sul Cuore / L'Amore Cambia"			Album – Cosi Diverso, Parto Da Qui, Parto Da Qui
12.	"Amami"			Album – Cosi Diverso
13.	"Someone Like You / Total Eclipse of the Heart / Pride"	Jim Steinman, Adele Laurie, Blue Adkins, Paul David Hewson, Larry Muller, Adam Clayton	Daniel Dodd Wilson, Jim Steinman, Dave Evans, U2	cover – Adele, Bonnie Tyler, U2
14.	"All by Myself"	Eric Carmen	Eric Carmen	cover – Eric Carmen
15.	"Go the Distance"	David Zippel	Alan Menken	cover – Disney Theme "Hercules"
16.	"Il cerchio della vita" (feat. Ivana Spagna)	Tim Rice	Elton John	cover – Ivana Spagna
17.	"A Whole New World" (feat. Ivana Spagna)	Tim Rice	Alan Menken	cover – Disney Theme "Aladdin"
18.	"Beauty And The Beast" (feat. Silvia Olari)	Howard Elliot Ashman	Alan Menken	cover – Disney Theme "Beauty And The Beast"
19.	"Silent Night"	Joseph Mohr	Franz Xaver Gruber	cover – Christmas Carol
20.	"Happy Xmas"	John Lennon	Yoko Ono	cover – John & Yoko/Plastic Ono Band
21.	"Oh Holy Night"	Jonh Dwight Sullivan	Frank Zueckmantel, A. Adam	cover – Christmas Carol
22.	"Santa Claus Is Coming to Town"	Haven Gillespie	J. Fred Coots	cover – Christmas Song
23.	"We Are the World"	Michael Jackson, Lionel Richie	Michael Jackson, Lionel Richie	cover – Charity Single
24.	"Oh Happy Day"	Edwin R. Hawkins	DP	cover – Gospel Hymn

== Band ==
For the live concert held in Rome, Valerio Scanu was accompanied by the following musicians:

- Martino Onorato: piano and musical director
- Stefano Profazi: guitar
- Roberto Lo Monaco: bass guitar
- Alessandro Pizzonia: drums
- Chorus : Sara Corbò, Lucy Campeti, Daniele Grammaldo.
