= Valerio Scanu =

Italian singer (born 1990)

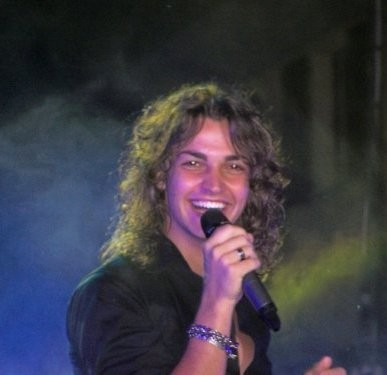
- Valerio Scanu in 2009

Background information
- Born: 10 April 1990 (age 36); La Maddalena, Sardinia, Italy
- Genres: Pop rock
- Occupation: Singer
- Instrument: Vocals
- Years active: 2008–present
- Labels: EMI (2009–2012); NatyLoveYou (from 2013)
- Website: www.valerioscanuofficial.com

Valerio Scanu (born 10 April 1990) is an Italian singer.

In 2008 Scanu took part in the eighth edition of the Italian talent show Amici di Maria De Filippi, in which he ended up in second place.

On 20 February 2010, he won the 60th edition of the televised Italian song contest Sanremo Music Festival with the song "Per tutte le volte che..."

In November 2022 he came out as gay.

== Career ==
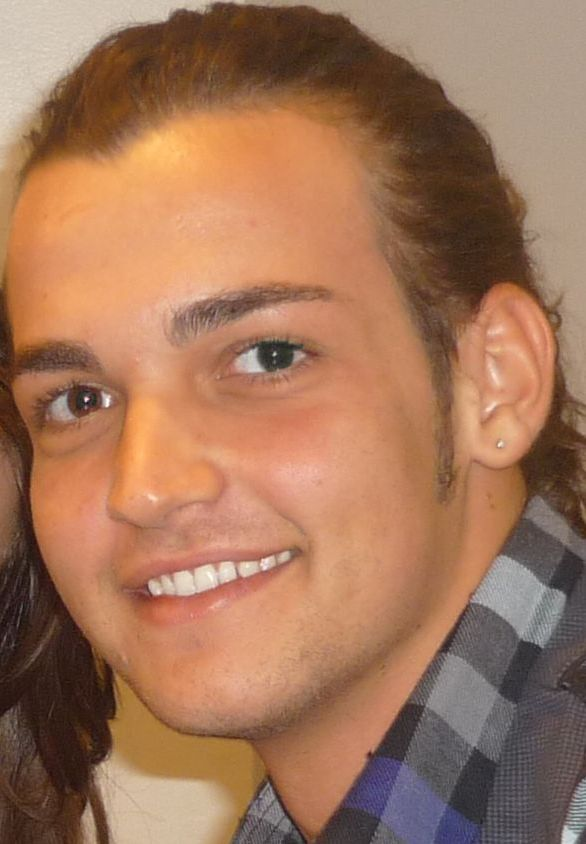
Scanu in October 2009 in Milan

=== Growing up ===
In 2000 he participated in the Festival "Canzoni sotto l'albero", during this festival he ranked third.

In 2002, Scanu participated in another TV program "Bravo Bravissimo" presented by Mike Bongiorno, and won the first prize.

During the summer months of years 2001–2007, Valerio Scanu performed several times at a piano bar in his hometown entertaining tourists of all nationalities with his voice.

In 2007 Scanu participated in various auditions such as the French version American Idol, Italian version X-Factor, and the musical Giulietta e Romeo by Riccardo Cocciante. He was not selected in any of these auditions. During the same year the took part in the Theatrical representation of the musical Notre Dame de Paris hosted in his hometown, acting the part of the singer 'Gregoire'.

=== Amici di Maria De Filippi ===
In 2008, Valerio Scanu participated as a contestant in the 8th edition of the TV talent show Amici di Maria De Filippi, during the final show he ranked second.

In January 2009 Sony BMG Italy released "Scialla", a compilation of the songs sung by the contestants of Amici di Maria De Filippi. In the album two unpublished songs of Valerio Scanu were inserted: "Can't Stop" and "Domani". The album reached rank number one in the Italian charts.

=== First EP ===
His first EP Sentimento was released on the day of his 19th birthday, 10 April 2009, in Italy, obtaining the Gold record for the number of sales done (30.000 copies). The album was preceded by the single holding the same name "Sentimento", and leaps immediately to the top of the downloads classification.

On 8 July 2009 a cover version of "Listen" by Beyoncé was digitally released. During the same period he was nominated and received winning a trophy at Wind Music Awards 2009 for the sales done for Sentimento.

=== First album ===
In October 2009, with close collaboration with producer Charlie Rapino, Scanu published his eponymous album, Valerio Scanu, which debuted at rank position four in the classification for sales exceeding targets for a Gold Record. Two months later there was a re-issue of this album entitled Valerio Scanu-Christmas Edition, containing an addition of four unpublished track. "Ricordati di noi" was the first single to be released which preceded the release of this album.

=== Winner of Sanremo Music Festival ===
In February 2010, Scanu became the winner of the 60th edition of the Sanremo Music Festival with his song "Per tutte le volte che", written by Pierdavide Carone. Scanu was initially eliminated after the second round of voting; however as a result of the number of televotes received, he was "saved" on the third evening of the contest, thus remaining a contestant and eventually ending up in the first place on the podium.

=== Second album ===
On 19 February 2010, Per tutte le volte che was released, which album contained nine tracks recorded between Italy and London, winning the Gold Record for the number of sales obtained (30.000 copies). Meanwhile, the single "Per tutte le volte che" obtained the Digital Download Platinum Record with over 30,000 downloads. From the album two more singles were later extracted and published, "Credi in me" and "Indissolubile."

=== Third album ===
On 9 November 2010, the third album Parto Da Qui was published. The album was preceded by the single "Mio", which arrived eighth in the FIMI chart. Parto Da Qui reached the second position of the most sold albums in Italy. The second single was "L'amore cambia" which single had a videoclip released as a Fan Version. Six months later, in April 2011, Parto da qui – Tour Edition was published, and arrived sixth in the FIMI chart. It was preceded by the single "Due stelle". This re-issued contained an additional DVD with videoclips from the "Love Show".

=== Fourth album ===
On 20 March 2012, Cosi Diverso was published, which album was anticipated by the single "Amami". A few months later the second single was extracted and published, "Libera mente".

== Discography ==
=== Studio albums ===
- 2009 – Valerio Scanu (16 October 2009) (ITA No. 4; Gold – 30,000+ copies)
- 2010 – Per tutte le volte che... (19 February 2010) (ITA No. 2; Gold – 30,000+ copies
- 2010 – Parto da qui (9 November 2010) (ITA No. 2; Gold – 30,000+ copies)
- 2012 – Così diverso (20 March 2012) (ITA No. 6)
- 2014 – Lasciami entrare (28 January 2014) (ITA No. 2)

=== Live albums ===
- 2013 – Valerio Scanu Live in Roma (11 June 2013) (ITA No. 21)

=== EPs ===
- 2009 – Sentimento (10 April 2009) (ITA No. 3: Gold, 30.000+ copies)
- 2010 – Per tutte le volte che... (16 April 2010)

=== Singles ===
- 2009 – Sentimento (No. 1 ITA)
- 2009 – Dopo di Me (No. 9 ITA)
- 2009 – Listen
- 2009 – Ricordati di noi (No. 8 ITA)
- 2009 – Polvere di stelle
- 2010 – Per tutte le volte che... (No. 1 ITA, Platinum; No. 30 CH)
- 2010 – Credi in me
- 2010 – Indissolubile
- 2010 – Mio (No. 8 ITA)
- 2011 – L'amore cambia
- 2011 – Due stelle
- 2012 – Amami
- 2012 – Libera mente
- 2014 – Sui nostri passi (No. 12 ITA)
- 2014 – Lasciami entrare (No. 4 ITA, Gold)
- 2014 – Parole di cristallo (No. 2 ITA, Gold)

== Awards and nominations ==
Year	Award	Category	Work	Result
2009	Wind Music Award	Gold Album	Sentimento (album)	Won
2010	Sanremo Festival	Artists	Per tutte le volte che... (single)	Won
2010	TRL Awards	My best TRL video	Per tutte le volte che... (videoclip)	Won
2010	TRL Awards	Man of the year	Himself	Nominated
2010	Wind Music Award	Gold Album	Valerio scanu (album)	Won
2010	Wind Music Award	Gold Album	Per tutte le volte che... (album)	Won
2010	Wind Music Award	Platinum single	Per tutte le volte che... (single)	Won
2010	Venice Music Award	Sanremo 2010's revelation	Himself	Won
2011	TRL Awards	Best talent show artist	Himself	Nominated
2011	Certification	Gold Album	Parto da qui (album)	Won
