= We Got Hood Love =

Single by Mary J. Blige featuring Trey Songz

from the album Stronger with Each Tear
- Released: March 30, 2010
- Length: 4:15
- Label: Matriarch; Geffen
- Songwriters: Mary J. Blige; Bryan-Michael Cox; Kendrick Dean; Johnta Austin
- Producers: Bryan-Michael Cox; WyldCard

Mary J. Blige singles chronology
| "Stairway to Heaven" (2010) | "We Got Hood Love" (2010) | "Someone to Love Me (Naked)" (2011) |

Trey Songz singles chronology
| "Neighbors Know My Name" (2010) | "We Got Hood Love" (2010) | "Sex Room" (2010) |

Music video
- "We Got Hood Love" on YouTube

"We Got Hood Love" is a song performed by American R&B recording artist Mary J. Blige featuring singer Trey Songz. It was written by Blige, Bryan-Michael Cox Kendrick "WyldCard" Dean and Johnta Austin for her ninth studio album, Stronger with Each Tear (2009), while production was helmed by Cox and Dean, with additional production from Ron Fair. It was released as the third American (fourth overall) and last single from the album.

== Background ==
The song was originally sung by Blige and Johnta Austin.

== Music video ==
A video was shot with Mary J. Blige and football player George Wilson in Miami, while Trey Songz shot his scenes in a New York City apartment. The video focuses on three couples who personify the definition of "Hood Love". Chris Robinson directed the video for the song. The video which although was originally scheduled to premiere on May 10, 2010, through Vevo actually appeared on Rap-Up on May 6, 2010.

== Charts ==
Weekly chart performance for "We Got Hood Love"
| Chart (2010) | Peak position |
|---|---|
| US Hot R&B/Hip-Hop Songs (Billboard) | 25 |

== Release history ==
Release dates and formats for "We Got Hood Love"
| Region | Format | Date | Label | Ref |
|---|---|---|---|---|
| United States | Urban adult contemporary | March 30, 2010 | Matriarch; Geffen | |
| United States | Urban contemporary | April 20, 2010 | Matriarch; Geffen | |
