= The One (Mary J. Blige song) =

Single by Mary J. Blige featuring Drake

from the album Stronger with Each Tear
- Released: July 21, 2009
- Length: 3:29
- Label: Geffen
- Songwriters: Mary J. Blige; Aubrey Graham; Esther Dean; Rodney Jerkins
- Producer: Rodney "Darkchild" Jerkins

Mary J. Blige singles chronology
"Remember Me" (2009)	"The One" (2009)	"Stronger" (2009)

Drake singles chronology
"Every Girl" (2009)	"The One" (2009)	"Forever" (2009)

Music video
- "The One" on YouTube

"The One" is a song by American singer Mary J. Blige featuring Canadian rapper Drake. Written alongside Ester Dean and producer Rodney "Darkchild" Jerkins, it was released on July 21, 2009 as the lead single from her ninth studio album Stronger with Each Tear. The song marked another entry on the Hot R&B/Hip-Hop Songs chart, on which it reached number 32. Blige's sum extended her lead for most charted titles among women in the 1990s and 2000s.

== Background ==
"The One" is an energetic uptempo lasting three minutes and twenty-nine seconds, written by Blige in collaboration with Drake and Ester Dean, and produced by producer Rodney "Darkchild" Jerkins. Blige described the song "the most successful of my career, I loved working with Drake, I am very passionate about hip hop, R&B and to dance. This song will not disappoint you, even my future album." Blige told radio host Angie Martinez on her New York radio show that the song introduces the world to the concept of "Crazy Mary", who uses auto tune. She explained: "It was for effect. I wanted 'Crazy Mary' to get her shine on. She couldn't get her shine with my regular voice. I used the effect. I used it as a telephone effect or reverb." Blige announced on June 27, 2009 that the official release for the single would not be until August 4. Despite her comments, the song was released on iTunes on July 21 for download.

== Critical reception ==
Billboard Magazine's Michael Menachem said that on the song, Blige joins "Auto-Tune nation" and that "The R&B siren sings a warped vocal that enhances the song's vibe of controlled chaos. Drake, who has his own hip-hop/R&B hit "Best I Ever Had," adds a punch of confidence that matches the intensity of Blige's snappy lyrics. Producer Rodney Jerkins, who has been churning out hits since the '90s, provides a forceful rhythmic structure for Blige in the form of a constant pulse underlying his pounding beats. Whether she's demanding exclusivity from her man or touting drama-free single life, Blige always sounds strong". BET.com wrote of the song: "With its of-the-moment digital sheen, complete with Auto-Tune and a Drake feature, this song features an amped-up Mary successfully updating her sound yet again."

== Music video ==
Blige filmed the accompanying music video for "The One" with director Anthony Mandler in August 2009, back-to-back with the video for her other single, "Stronger". Drake still appeared on the set for the video, despite reinjuring his ACL on stage during the America's Most Wanted Tour just days before.

The final video was released on August 28, 2009. It depicts Blige in different scenes with neon lights in most of them, Drake is shown rapping alone and in front of Blige. A success on BET's 106 & Park, it battled for the number one spot daily. Its success on BET led it to place on the network's Notarized: Top 100 Videos of 2009 countdown at number 35.

== Charts ==
=== Weekly charts ===
Weekly chart performance for "The One"
Chart (2009)	Peak position
Canada Hot 100 (Billboard)	83
Netherlands Urban (MegaCharts)	14
US Billboard Hot 100	63
US Hot R&B/Hip-Hop Songs (Billboard)	32

=== Year-end charts ===
Annual chart rankings for "The One"
Chart (2009)	Position
US Hot R&B/Hip-Hop Songs (Billboard)	99
