= Silvia Olari (album) =

Studio album by Silvia Olari
- Released: March 27, 2009
- Genre: Pop; soul
- Length: 25:57
- Label: Warner Bros. Records
- Producer: Luca Jurman

Silvia Olari chronology
Silvia Olari (2009)	Libera da (2010)

Singles from Silvia Olari
- 1. "Fino all'Anima" Released: March 27, 2009

Silvia Olari is the debut album by Italian pop singer Silvia Olari, released on March 27, 2009, by Warner Bros. Records. Luca Jurman collaborated as musician and arranger for the album. Nek wrote the lead single and opening track, "Fino all'Anima".

== Track listing ==
1. "Fino all'Anima" — 3:47
2. "Apro le mie Ali" — 3:49
3. "Everyday" — 4:02
4. "Che Posso Darti Ancora" — 3:33
5. "Rivoluzione" — 4:17
6. "Raccontami di te" — 3:43
7. "Wise Girl" — 4:06

== Charts ==
Chart (2009)	Peak position
Italian Albums Chart	21
