= Per tutte le volte che... =

Single by Valerio Scanu

from the album Per tutte le volte che...
- Released: 16 February 2010
- Genre: Pop ballad
- Length: 3:57
- Label: EMI
- Songwriter: Pierdavide Carone

Valerio Scanu singles chronology
"Polvere di stelle" (2009)	"Per tutte le volte che..." (2010)	"Credi in me" (2010)

Music video
- "Per tutte le volte che" on YouTube

"Per tutte le volte che..." (lit. 'For all the times that...') is a 2010 song written by Pierdavide Carone and performed by Valerio Scanu. It won the 60th edition of the Sanremo Music Festival.

== Background ==
The song was initially titled "Un attimo con te" ('A moment with you'), and its lyrics describe a romantic relationship which seems to be over but ends continuing besides all its crises. During the festival, the song was eliminated during the second night, but was reinstated in the competition after performing the song in a duet with Alessandra Amoroso during the third night.

== Track listing ==
No.	Title	Length
1.	"Per tutte le volte che..."	3:57

== Charts ==
Chart (2010)	Peak position
Italy (FIMI)	1
Italy Airplay (EarOne)	31
Switzerland (Schweizer Hitparade)	30

== Certifications ==
Region	Certification	Certified units/sales
Italy (FIMI)	Platinum	30,000^{*}
^{*} Sales figures based on certification alone.
