= Dru Joyce II =

American high school basketball coach

Biographical details
- Born: July 26, 1955 (age 71); East Liverpool, Ohio, U.S.
- Education: Ohio

Coaching career (HC unless noted)
- 1999–2001: St. Vincent–St. Mary HS (assistant)
- 2001–present: St. Vincent–St. Mary HS

Dru Joyce II, known as “Coach Dru,” is a high school basketball coach. He is the founder of the Northeast Ohio Basketball Association, a subject of the documentary More than a Game, author of the book “Beyond Championships: A Playbook for Winning at Life,” and the National Championship winning coach for the 2003 St. Vincent St. Mary boys basketball team, led by the “Fab Five.”

== Background ==
Dru Joyce II was born in East Liverpool, Ohio on July 26, 1955. In 1978, he graduated from Ohio University with a degree in business administration and began a career in sales for Hunt-Wesson Foods in Pittsburgh, Pennsylvania. In 1984, Joyce and his family relocated to Akron, Ohio. He began coaching his son Dru Joyce III (“Little Dru”) in 1995, and had a knack for finding promising young basketball talent in his community. One of the young talents that caught Coach Dru's eye at the Summit Lake Recreation Center was a 10-year-old boy named LeBron James. Coach Dru convinced LeBron's mother, Gloria, to let him join an AAU basketball team called the Shooting Stars. Little Dru and LeBron, soon joined by Sian Cotton and Willie McGee, continued to play together under coach Dru's leadership and developed into remarkable basketball players.

In 1999, Coach Dru was named assistant coach of the St. Vincent-St. Mary boys basketball team under NCAA coach Keith Dambrot. That fall, Dru Joyce III, LeBron James, Sian Cotton, and Willie McGee all entered their freshman year at St. Vincent-St. Mary High School, determined to fulfill their dream of a National Championship. They won the 2000 Division III State Basketball Championship, which they would repeat in 2001, joined by sophomore transfer Romeo Travis, who would become the fifth member of what would be known as the “Fab Five.”

In the fall of 2001, Coach Dru was named the head basketball coach for St. Vincent-St. Mary. After a rough 2001–2002 season, Coach Dru and the Fab Five regrouped and came back stronger than ever in 2003. Not only did they clinch the Division II Ohio State Boys Basketball Championship, they were also declared national champions by USA Today.

Coach Dru began hosting an annual AAU basketball tournament in 2005. Originally called the King James Shooting Stars, the tournament was later renamed the Dru Joyce Classic.

Today, Coach Dru continues to serve as head basketball coach at St. Vincent-St. Mary High School in Akron, OH, as well as the head of the Northeast Ohio Basketball Association. He is also the founder of the Dru Joyce Classic, one of the top 5 youth AAU basketball tournaments in the United States.

Dru Joyce II published his first book, “Beyond Championships: A Playbook for Winning at Life,” in April 2015. The foreword is written by his former player, LeBron James.
