= Drop It Low (Ester Dean song) =

Single by Ester Dean featuring Chris Brown

from the album Music Inspired by More than a Game
- Released: August 9, 2009
- Recorded: 2009
- Genre: Pop rap
- Length: 3:14 (main version); 4:58 (remix)
- Label: Zone 4/Streamline/Interscope
- Songwriters: Ester Dean; Chris Brown; Jamal Jones
- Producer: Polow da Don

Ester Dean singles chronology
"Drop It Low" (2009)	"Love Suicide" (2011)

Chris Brown singles chronology
"Better on the Other Side" (2009)	"Drop It Low" (2009)	"I Can Transform Ya" (2009)

"Drop It Low" is the debut single by American singer and songwriter Ester Dean. The official version features vocals from R&B singer Chris Brown. This was also released as the second single from the soundtrack for the film More than a Game (2009). The original version of the song did not feature Chris Brown, and maintained the same lyrics on the second verse but coming from a man's perspective. The official remix features Lil Wayne, Trey Songz and Diddy.

== Development ==
The song's producer, Polow da Don later stated that the song was originally meant for Ciara, but when the singer passed on it, it was eventually given to Ester Dean.

Pop singer Britney Spears wanted to record "Drop It Low" for her album Femme Fatale before Dean used it as her own single.

== Critical reception ==
It was highlighted by AllMusic's Jason Thurson.

== Remix ==
The remix initially began when Lil Wayne recorded his verse for the record, replacing Ester's original verse. A clean and explicit version were released of it. Later, Trey Songz released a new remix of the song, adding a new intro, keeping Wayne's verse, adding a new verse by himself, and a new verse from Chris Brown. After that, the official remix was released with Diddy talking throughout the track, replacing Trey Songz on the intro, and with a slight change in beat during Chris Brown's verse.

== Official versions ==
- "Drop It Low" (Main Version) / (Explicit Version) – 3:14
- "Drop It Low" (Remix) (feat. Diddy, Lil Wayne, Trey Songz & Chris Brown) – 4:58

== Music video ==
The music video was shot in August 2009, by the director Joseph Kahn who has worked with Brown previously on the "Forever" music video. It premiered on music video channels MTV, BET, and Fuse during the week of September 15, 2009. The video features both Dean and Brown, as well as some cameo appearances by Nelly, Keri Hilson, Teyana Taylor, Polow da Don, Omarion, Audio Push, Twerk Team, Soulja Boy, Rich Boy, Brandy, and Barry "Mijo" Bradford.

== Chart performance ==
Once "Drop It Low" became available for airplay on US rhythm/crossover radio on August 18, 2009, and mainstream radio on August 25, 2009, the song started gaining more airplay on the three main formats. By the week ending of August 28, 2009, the song debuted at number 88 on the US Hot R&B/Hip-Hop Songs chart based only on airplay. By the next week, it debuted at number 94 on the Billboard Hot 100. "Drop It Low" peaked at number 38, helped by its digital sales.

== Charts ==
Chart (2009)	Peak position
US Billboard Hot 100	38
US Hot R&B/Hip-Hop Songs (Billboard)	33
US Latin Rhythm Airplay (Billboard)	31
US Pop Songs (Billboard)	32
US Rhythmic Airplay (Billboard)	15

== Release history ==
Release dates and formats for "Drop It Low"
Region	Date	Format	Label(s)	Ref.
United States	August 25, 2009	Mainstream airplay	Interscope	

== Other appearances ==
"Drop It Low" appears on The Bling Ring: Original Motion Picture Soundtrack (2013). The song's tempo and rhythms were recycled for the track "Work Wit It" by Chris Brown on his mixtape In My Zone.
