= Sentimento (Valerio Scanu song) =

Single by Valerio Scanu

from the album Sentimento
- Released: 3 April 2009
- Recorded: 2009
- Genre: Pop, classic
- Length: 4:11 (Album Version)
- Label: EMI
- Songwriters: Andrea del Principe, Alessandra Dini

Valerio Scanu singles chronology
"Sentimento" (2009)	"Dopo di Me" (2009)

"Sentimento" is a pop ballad written for Italian singer Valerio Scanu's debut album, Sentimento. The song is the album's lead single (Scanu's official first single), released in Italy and others European countries. The single has reached number one in Italy.

== Track listing ==
Digital download/EP

1. "Sentimento" – 4:11

== Charts ==
Chart (2009)	Peak position
Italian Singles Chart	1

=== Year-end charts ===
Chart (2009)	Position
Italian Singles Chart	84
