= Forever (Drake, Kanye West, Lil Wayne, and Eminem song) =

2009 single

Single by Drake, Kanye West, Lil Wayne, and Eminem

from the album Music Inspired by More than a Game and Relapse: Refill
- Released: August 27, 2009
- Recorded: 2008–2009
- Genre: Hip hop
- Length: 5:57 (album version); 5:22 (radio edit)
- Label: Young Money; Cash Money; Universal Motown
- Songwriters: Aubrey Graham; Kanye West; Dwayne Carter Jr.; Marshall Mathers III; Matthew Samuels
- Producer: Boi-1da

Drake singles chronology
| "Money to Blow" (2009) | "Forever" (2009) | "Fed Up" (2009) |

Alternative cover
- Drake as the main artist, while the other latter are considered features. "&" is replaced with "AND".

Kanye West singles chronology
| "Run This Town" (2009) | "Forever" (2009) | "Whatever U Want" (2009) |

Lil Wayne singles chronology
| "Every Girl" (2009) | "Forever" (2009) | "Money to Blow" (2009) |

Eminem singles chronology
| "Beautiful" (2009) | "Forever" (2009) | "Drop the World" (2010) |

Music videos
- "Forever" (Explicit) on YouTube
- "Forever" (Clean) on YouTube

"Forever" is a song by Canadian rapper Drake and American rappers Kanye West, Lil Wayne, and Eminem. Written alongside producer Boi-1da, the song was originally released on August 27, 2009, as the third single from the soundtrack to LeBron James' More than a Game documentary, and was placed on the Refill re-release of Eminem's album Relapse (2009).

Eminem performed his verse of the song at the American Music Awards of 2009. Drake performed the song with Lil Wayne, Eminem, and Travis Barker at the 52nd Annual Grammy Awards. A demo version of the song was leaked in mid-2008.

== Background ==
The track was produced by Boi-1da, and was first used by Kardinal Offishall in early 2008 on the unreleased song "Bring It Back", featuring R. City. Kardinal did not use the song for his album and it was later re-sold to Drake. This original version leaked in late 2008, as "I Want This Forever" featuring Lil Wayne and Kidd Kidd. In an interview, Kardinal stated that his version was a leaked demo which was supposed to appear on his album Not 4 Sale, as well as a soundtrack.

The officially released version of "Forever" features Kanye West, Lil Wayne, and Eminem. Rapper Jay-Z has called it "the best posse cut of the year". The song title is derived from the last line of the chorus; "I want this shit forever, mane."

According to an interview with West, he said, "When I heard Eminem's verse on the Drake shit, I went back and rewrote my shit for two days. I cancelled appointments to rewrite!" Similarly, Lil Wayne rewrote his verse after hearing Eminem's. In response to this, Eminem told Complex, "Everybody approached the beat different […] For some reason, I felt the beat was a double-time beat, so I rapped faster."

== Composition ==
The song is written in the key of C minor, with a tempo of 80 beats per minute.

== Music video ==
The music video was shot in Fontainebleau Hotel in Miami, Florida, in early September 2009. However, Eminem's part in the video was shot in Detroit due to scheduling conflicts and not being able to be in Miami. The music video was shot and directed by Hype Williams. It premiered on September 22, 2009, on BET's music program 106 & Park. LeBron James appears in the opening of the music video in the back seat of a Maybach playing online poker on PokerStars on his customized Beats by Dr. Dre's laptop. Throughout the video, there are clips and pictures from the documentary about James, More than a Game, and of him as a child playing basketball. Also The Alchemist, Trick-Trick, Mr. Porter, Swifty McVay, Kuniva, Bizarre and Slaughterhouse all make cameo appearances in Eminem's verse of the video behind him as he raps his verse. Birdman makes a cameo appearances in the video on Lil Wayne's verse, sitting next to him in the VIP section of the club. The music video was produced alongside the video for "Money to Blow".

== Critical reception ==
Jason Thurston of AllMusic marked the song as one of the standout tracks of the album, writing: "The record hits a high point early on the six-minute epic 'Forever,' a convention of rap's wordsmiths as Kanye West, Drake, Lil Wayne, and Eminem pass the baton over a dark, soulful, slightly mournful beat, separated by an echoing modern R&B Auto-Tune hook." Stephen Thomas Erlewine of AllMusic also highlighted the song, and commented: "['Forever'] is none too coincidentally the one track in the entirety of Eminem's 2009 comeback that feels utterly modern." Entertainment Weekly was positive: "Those who frequent hip-hop blogs will already be acquainted with the strongest material, like Drake's 'Forever' — where the rookie teams with all-stars Lil Wayne, Kanye West, and Eminem" and it was also on Download This list.

== Chart performance ==
"Forever" entered the U.S. Billboard Hot R&B/Hip-Hop Songs chart at number fifty-eight on September 3, 2009, peaking at No. 2. The song became the most downloaded song for the week ending September 15, 2009. On the week of September 24, the song debuted at No. 8 on the Billboard Hot 100, making it Drake's highest debut on the chart at the time as well as his second top-ten single. It also topped the Rap Songs chart making it Drake's second number one on that chart. It was the tenth consecutive top 40 single for Eminem. The song had sold 3,265,000 digital copies in the US as of April 2013, becoming Drake's first 3 million-seller.

"Forever" failed to enter the top 40 on the UK Singles Chart, but did manage to peak at number 43 after strong downloads. The song then began to drop out of the UK Singles Chart, but on January 10, 2010, "Forever" climbed 7 places from number 49 to 42, marking its highest peak to date. "Forever" entered the Irish Singles Chart, reaching a peak of number 41.

== Awards and nominations ==
| Year | Ceremony | Award | Result |
|---|---|---|---|
| 2010 | BET Awards | Best Collaboration | Nominated |
| 2010 | BET Hip Hop Awards | Reese's Perfect Combo Award | Nominated |

== Track listing ==
Digital download

| No. | Title | Writer(s) | Producer(s) | Length |
|---|---|---|---|---|
| 1. | "Forever" | Aubrey Graham; Kanye West; Dwayne Carter, Jr.; Marshall Mathers III; Matthew Samuels | Boi-1da | 5:57 |

== Charts ==
=== Weekly charts ===
| Chart (2009–2010) | Peak position |
|---|---|
| Australia (ARIA) | 99 |
| Canada Hot 100 (Billboard) | 26 |
| Ireland (IRMA) | 41 |
| Switzerland (Schweizer Hitparade) | 68 |
| UK Singles (Official Charts) | 42 |
| UK Hip Hop/R&B (Official Charts) | 14 |
| UK Indie (Official Charts) | 35 |
| US Billboard Hot 100 | 8 |
| US Hot R&B/Hip-Hop Songs (Billboard) | 2 |
| US Hot Rap Songs (Billboard) | 1 |
| US Pop Airplay (Billboard) | 24 |
| US Rhythmic Airplay (Billboard) | 4 |

=== Year-end charts ===
| Chart (2009) | Position |
|---|---|
| US Billboard Hot 100 | 88 |
| US Hot R&B/Hip-Hop Songs (Billboard) | 68 |

| Chart (2010) | Position |
|---|---|
| US Billboard Hot 100 | 71 |
| US Hot R&B/Hip-Hop Songs (Billboard) | 76 |
| US Rhythmic (Billboard) | 38 |

== Certifications ==
| Region | Certification | Certified units/sales |
|---|---|---|
| Australia (ARIA) | 2× Platinum | 140,000^{‡} |
| Denmark (IFPI Danmark) | Gold | 45,000^{‡} |
| New Zealand (RMNZ) | Platinum | 30,000^{‡} |
| United Kingdom (BPI) | Platinum | 600,000^{‡} |
| United States (RIAA) | Diamond | 10,000,000^{‡} |
^{‡} Sales+streaming figures based on certification alone.

== Release history ==
Release dates and formats for "Forever"
| Region | Date | Format | Label(s) | Ref. |
|---|---|---|---|---|
| United States | November 17, 2009 | Mainstream airplay | Universal Motown | |
