= Each Tear =

- Cover for the UK and International versions

Single by Mary J. Blige featuring Jay Sean

from the album Stronger with Each Tear
- Released: February 26, 2010
- Length: 4:15 (with Jay Sean); 4:17(with Tiziano Ferro); 4:17 (with Rea Garvey)
- Label: Geffen; Universal Music
- Songwriters: Mary J. Blige; Mitchum Chin; Dwayne Chin-Quee
- Producer: Supa Dups

Mary J. Blige singles chronology
"I Am" (2009)	"Each Tear" (2010)	"Stairway to Heaven" (2010)

Tiziano Ferro singles chronology
"Scivoli Di Nuovo" (2009)	"Each Tear" (2010)	"La differenza tra me e te" (2011)

Rea Garvey singles chronology
"Aeroplane" (2010)	"Each Tear" (2010)

Jay Sean singles chronology
"I Made It (Cash Money Heroes)" (2010)	"Each Tear" (2010)	"2012 (It Ain't the End)" (2010)

K'naan singles chronology
"Wavin' Flag" (Coca-Cola Celebration Mix) (2010)	"Each Tear" (2010)	"Wavin' Flag" (Celebration Mix) (2010)

Music video
- "Each Tear" on YouTube

"Each Tear" is a song performed by American R&B recording artist Mary J. Blige. It was released as the second international single from her ninth studio album, Stronger with Each Tear. The song is originally sung by just Blige on the US version of her album though on the re-release and on international releases the song is a featured duet to reflect each of the international markets.

== Release and promotion ==
The song was re-recorded with several different artists to reflect the international markets. It is featured on editions of the album with one of five people: with Jay Sean for the UK and other countries; with Tiziano Ferro for Italy; with Vanessa Amorosi for Australia; with K'naan for Canada; and with Rea Garvey for Germany.

The Italian version was released to the Italian iTunes Store on February 26, 2010. The German version was released on May 7 as a digital download and on June 18 as a CD single. The UK version was released on May 9, 2010.

== Music video ==
The music video was filmed in Los Angeles by director Marcus Raboy. A different edit of the song is used for each version of the song but essentially the videos feature the same black and white scenes with the guest vocalist appearing alongside Blige. The video for Italian version featuring Tiziano Ferro was the first to be released on March 24, 2010 which was followed by the release of the UK version with Jay Sean on April 1, 2010. The German version premiered on Vevo on April 20, 2010.

== Chart performance ==
On March 18, 2010 the single made its first worldwide chart debut by appearing on the Italian charts at number six. The following week it peaked at number one where it stayed for one week. It then fell to number three and number six over the following weeks but on April 15, 2010 it rose again to position number three.

== Formats and track listings ==
- US/Canadian digital download
1. "Each Tear" - 4:17
- Italian digital download
1. "Each Tear" (featuring Tiziano Ferro) - 4:17
- German digital download
1. "Each Tear" (featuring Rea Garvey) - 4:15
- UK/International digital download
1. "Each Tear" (featuring Jay Sean) - 4:17

== Charts ==
=== Weekly charts ===
Weekly chart performance for "Each Tear"
Chart (2010)	Peak position
Italy (FIMI) featuring Tiziano Ferro	1
UK Singles (Official Charts)	183

=== Year-end charts ===
Year-end chart performance for "Each Tear"
Chart (2010)	Peak position
Italy (FIMI)	29
Italy Airplay (EarOne)	23

== Certifications ==
Certifications for "Each Tear"
Region	Certification	Certified units/sales
Italy (FIMI)	Platinum	30,000^{*}
^{*} Sales figures based on certification alone.

== Release history ==
"Each Tear" release history
Region	Format	Date	Label	Ref.
Italy	Digital download	February 26, 2010	Universal Music	
Germany	Digital download	May 7, 2010	Universal Music	
United Kingdom	Digital download	May 9, 2010	Polydor Records	
Germany	CD single	June 18, 2010	Universal Music Group	
