= Dru Joyce III =

American basketball player and coach

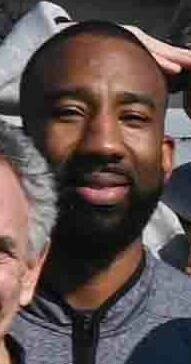

Duquesne Dukes
- Title: Head coach
- League: Atlantic 10 Conference

Personal information
- Born: January 29, 1985 (age 41) Akron, Ohio, U.S.
- Listed height: 6 ft 0 in (1.83 m)
- Listed weight: 165 lb (75 kg)

Career information
- High school: St. Vincent–St. Mary (Akron, Ohio)
- College: Akron (2003–2007)
- NBA draft: 2007: undrafted
- Playing career: 2007–2019
- Position: Point guard
- Number: 25

Career history

Playing
- 2007–2009: Ratiopharm Ulm
- 2009: Energa Czarni Slupsk
- 2009–2010: Anwil Wloclawek
- 2010–2012: Trier
- 2012–2014: EWE Baskets Oldenburg
- 2014–2015: Basketball Löwen Braunschweig
- 2015–2016: S.Oliver Würzburg
- 2016–2017: Tsmoki-Minsk
- 2017: Bayern Munich
- 2017–2018: AS Monaco
- 2018: CSP Limoges
- 2018–2019: Science City Jena

Coaching
- 2019–2022: Cleveland State (assistant)
- 2022–2024: Duquesne (Associate HC)
- 2024–present: Duquesne

Career highlights
- Second-team All-MAC (2007)

Dru Joyce III (born January 29, 1985) is an American men's college basketball coach and former professional player who is the head coach for the Duquesne Dukes. His coaching career began in 2019–20 with the Cleveland State Vikings after a 12-year professional playing career in Europe. He retired as the all-time assists leader in Germany's Basketball Bundesliga (since eclipsed). Joyce is a close friend of LeBron James and was his teammate at St. Vincent–St. Mary High School.

Joyce was named the 18th head coach in Duquesne program history in March of 2024 following the retirement of Keith Dambrot. The pair had a long relationship going back to Joyce's youth, where he attended Dambrot's basketball skill sessions at the Akron Jewish Community Center, before crossing paths again as player and coach at Akron and then as colleagues at Duquesne.

Joyce's father and brother are both successful high school basketball coaches. As of 2026, Dru Joyce II was the head coach at St. Vincent–St. Mary High School, while Dru Joyce III's brother, Cameron, was the head coach at Loyola High School in Los Angeles, California after previously leading Cleveland St. Ignatius.

== Head coaching record ==
Record table
Season	Team	Overall	Conference	Standing	Postseason
Duquesne Dukes (Atlantic 10 Conference) (2024–present)
2024–25	Duquesne	13–19	8–10	9th	
2025–26	Duquesne	18–15	9–9	7th	
Duquesne:		31–34 (.477)	17–19 (.472)		
Total:		31–34 (.477)			
