= Sentimento (EP) =

EP by Valerio Scanu
- Released: 2009
- Recorded: Italy
- Genre: Pop
- Length: 22:39
- Language: Italian, English
- Label: EMI Italy
- Producer: Mario Lavezzi

Valerio Scanu chronology
Sentimento (2009)	Valerio Scanu (2009)

Singles from Sentimento
- 1. "Sentimento" Released: 3 April 2009; 2. "Dopo di me" Released: 22 May 2009

Sentimento is the first EP, a solo debut, of Italian singer Valerio Scanu, which was published on April 10, 2009 by EMI and certified Platinum Record on the next year.

The EP contains six tracks, a couple of which were presented in the talent show Amici di Maria De Filippi Season 2008-2009. The tracks "Can't stop" (Top Digital Download at position #19) and "Domani" also form part of the compilation Scialla.

From the EP, (certified Gold Record for selling over 30,000 copies), and then Platinum Record for over 70.000. There were two individual extracts: "Sentimento" airplayed on radio from April 3, 2009 (which reached the maximum position of the 1st Top Digital Download) and "Dopo di me", written by Malika Ayane, airplayed on radio from May 2009 (reached the maximum position of the 9th Top Digital Download). A videoclip for the single "Dopo di me" was also released. The Platinum Disc for Sentimento was given to Valerio Scanu by Maria De Filippi on the next year during the TV show "Amici Casting"

The EP "Sentimento" debuted at the 3rd ranking position of the FIMI Artists classification, the highest position achieved by this album.

== Songs and authors ==
Songs	Authors	Duration
Sentimento	Andrea del Principe - Alessandra Dini	4:17
All That You Now	Mac - Hector	4:16
Lontano	M. Rinalduzzi - M. D'Angelo - T. Blu	2:59
Dopo di Me	Ferdinando Arnò - Malika Ayane	3:54
Can't Stop	Stuart Argyle - Gautreau	3:30
Domani	Camba - Coro	3:44

== Charts ==
Chart (2009)	Peak position
Italy	3
