= Sentimiento =

Sentimiento or Sentimientos may refer to:

== Music ==
=== Albums ===
- Sentimiento (album), a 2007 album by Ivy Queen
- Sentimiento, album by Omara Portuondo (2005)
- Sentimiento, Rubén González (2006)
- Sentimiento, Amalia Mendoza (2003)
- Sentimientos, Grupo Límite
- Sentimientos, Stravaganzza (2005)
- Sentimientos, album by Camilo Sesto (1978)
- Sentimientos (album), 1996 album by Charlie Zaa
- ¡Qué Sentimiento!, Héctor Lavoe (1981)
- Sentimiento Tú, Cheo Feliciano (1980)
- El Señor Sentimiento, Cheo Feliciano (2009)
- Sentimiento Latino, Juan Diego Flórez album (2006)
- Nuestro Sentimiento Latino, Larry Harlow release on Coco Records (1981)

=== Songs ===
- "Sentimiento", a 1965 song by Al Hurricane
- "Sentimiento" (song), a song by Colombian pop singer Anasol 2005
- "Sentimiento", a 1992 song by Cheo Feliciano from Profundo
- "Sentimiento", a song by José Ignacio "Papi" Tovar
- "Sentimientos" (Ivy Queen song), a 2007 single from the Sentimiento album
- "Sentimientos" (José José song)

== See also ==
- Sentimento (Italian and Portuguese)
