= Stronger (Mary J. Blige song) =

Single by Mary J. Blige

from the album Music Inspired by More than a Game and Stronger with Each Tear
- Released: August 18, 2009
- Recorded: 2009
- Genre: R&B; soul
- Length: 4:08
- Label: Geffen
- Songwriters: Chauncey Hollis; Chris Brown; Darnell Dalton; Esther Dean; Jamal Jones; Mary J. Blige
- Producers: Hit-Boy; Polow da Don

Mary J. Blige singles chronology
"The One" (2009)	"Stronger" (2009)	"What Child Is This" (2009)

"Stronger" is a song by American singer Mary J. Blige, released on August 18, 2009 as the second single from the LeBron James documentary film More than a Game's accompanying soundtrack, as well as Blige's ninth studio album, Stronger with Each Tear (2010). It was co-written by Blige alongside background vocalist Chris Brown, Ester Dean, Darnell Dalton, Polow da Don and Hit-Boy, while production was helmed by the latter two. It first released on iTunes and Amazon, and serviced to US radio on September 8, 2009.

Blige performed the song on Good Morning America on September 11, 2009. She also performed it on the Late Show with David Letterman on September 23, 2009.

== Background and release ==
The song deals with issues surrounding people standing by one another through the difficult times. Blige sings "Now we're stronger... stronger... stronger..." referencing that relationships have more strength once they have been tested and people stand by each other. The song was produced by Polow da Don and Hit-Boy especially for the Music Inspired by More Than a Game which is the official soundtrack album to the film More than a Game.

== Music video ==
The music video, which premiered on August 21, 2009, features Blige singing in a quarry and amidst clouds. Footage from More Than a Game is interspersed throughout, and the video begins and ends with quotations by LeBron James. The video was directed by Anthony Mandler.

== Charts ==
Chart (2009)	Peak position
US Hot R&B/Hip-Hop Songs (Billboard)	84
