= More than a Game (soundtrack) =

Music Inspired by More than a Game

Soundtrack album by various artists
- Released: September 29, 2009
- Recorded: 2008–2009
- Genre: Hip hop; R&B
- Length: 45:52
- Label: Harvey Mason; Streamline; Z IV; Interscope
- Producer: Harvey Mason Jr (executive); Polow da Don; Boi-1da; HamSquad; C. Harris; Lil' C; Mars; Hit-Boy; Kanye West; Ke'Noe; Rich Boy; Jerome Harmon; Jared Evan; J. Valentine; Tank

Singles from Music Inspired by More than a Game
- 1. "Drop It Low" Released: August 9, 2009; 2. "Stronger" Released: August 18, 2009; 3. "Forever" Released: August 27, 2009; 4. "Frozen" Released: 2009

Professional ratings
Review scores
| Source | Rating |
|---|---|
| AllMusic | 3.5/5 stars |
| Entertainment Weekly | C− |

Music Inspired by More than a Game is the official soundtrack album name for music taken from and inspired by the documentary film More than a Game. The film is centered on the life of LeBron James and was released in October 2009. The soundtrack and film were both executive produced by Harvey Mason Jr. on behalf of Interscope Records and Lionsgate. The soundtrack album was released on September 28, 2009, in the United Kingdom and September 29, 2009, in the United States by Zone 4 and Interscope Records.

== Background ==
More than a Game is a 2009 documentary film that follows basketball superstar LeBron James and four of his teammates through the trials and tribulations of high school basketball in Ohio and James' journey to fame. The trailer was released in April, which featured Mary J. Blige's song from the soundtrack "Stronger".

The album was preceded by four singles: "Drop It Low", "Stronger", "Forever" and "Frozen". Each were accompanied with music videos, along with the song "Top of the World" by Rich Boy.

== Track listing ==
| No. | Title | Producer(s) | Length |
|---|---|---|---|
| 1. | "Drop It Low" (Ester Dean featuring Chris Brown) | Polow da Don; Ester Dean | 3:10 |
| 2. | "Forever" (Drake featuring Kanye West, Lil Wayne and Eminem) | Boi-1da | 5:57 |
| 3. | "King on Set" (T.I. featuring Young Dro) | 1500 or Nothin'; Lil' C (co.) | 3:43 |
| 4. | "Stronger" (Mary J. Blige) | Polow da Don; Hit-Boy (co.) | 4:03 |
| 5. | "History" (Jay-Z featuring Tony Williams) | Kanye West; Kenoe; Jeff Bhasker (co.) | 4:39 |
| 6. | "Top of the World" (Rich Boy featuring Chili Chil) | Polow Da Don; Chase N. Cashe (co.) | 4:04 |
| 7. | "I'm Ballin'" (Soulja Boy) | HamSquad (Joe Vega III) | 3:35 |
| 8. | "We Ready" (Ya Boy) | Harvey Mason, Jr. | 3:38 |
| 9. | "Go Hard" (Hayes) | Timbaland; Jerome "J-Roc" Harmon | 4:08 |
| 10. | "Frozen" (Jared Evan) | Jared Evan; Dwayne "D-Town" Nesmith | 3:51 |
| 11. | "If You Dream" (Tank featuring Tyrese, Toni Braxton, Jordin Sparks, Omarion, Faith Evans, JoJo, Charlie Wilson, Tamar Braxton and Steve Russell) | Harvey Mason Jr.; Tank; J. Valentine | 5:03 |

== Personnel ==
- Executive producer: Harvey Mason Jr.
- Conception and distribution: Interscope Records, Lions Gate Entertainment
- Vocals: Ester Dean, Drake, T.I., Mary J. Blige, Jay Z, Rich Boy, Soulja Boy, Ya Boy, Hayes, Jared Evan, Tank
- Guest vocals: Chris Brown, Kanye West, Lil Wayne, Eminem, Young Dro, Chili Chil, Tyrese, Toni Braxton, Jordin Sparks, Omarion, Faith Evans, JoJo, Charlie Wilson, Tamar Braxton, Steve Russell, Tony Williams
- Producers: Jamal Polow da Don Jones, Mattew "Boi-1da" Samuels, C. Harris, D. Quinn, L. Edwards, Hit Boy, Kanye West, Hamsquad, Kenoe, Jason Perry, Jerome Harmon, Harvey Mason Jr., Jared Evan, J. Valentine, Durrell "Tank" Babbs,
- Production associates: Zone 4 Productions & Zone 4 inc, 1da-Boi Productions, The Smash Factory Productions, Very Good Beats, NIghtrydas Productions, Harvey Mason Media, Song Dynasty, HamSquad Inc.

== Release history ==
| Country | Format | Date | Label |
|---|---|---|---|
| United Kingdom | Censored | September 28, 2009 | Polydor Records |
| United Kingdom | Uncensored | September 29, 2009 | Polydor Records |
| United States | Censored; Uncensored | September 29, 2009 | Interscope Records |

== Chart positions ==
| Chart (2009) | Peak position |
|---|---|
| US Billboard 200 | 81 |
| US Billboard Top R&B/Hip-Hop Albums | 18 |
| US Billboard Top Rap Albums | 10 |
| US Billboard Top Soundtracks | 12 |
