= Silvia Olari =

Italian pop, rock, soul and R&B singer (born 1988)

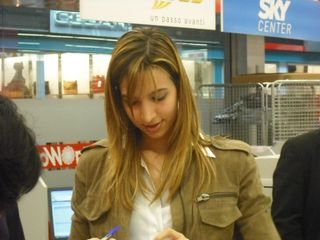
- Silvia Olari signing autographs 2009

Background information
- Born: 17 July 1988 (age 38); Parma, Italy
- Genres: Pop; R&B; soul
- Occupations: Singer; pianist
- Instruments: Vocals; piano
- Years active: 2008–present
- Labels: Warner Bros.; Warner Music Italy
- Website: silviaolari.warnermusic.it

Silvia Olari (born 17 July 1988) is an Italian pop, rock, soul and R&B singer. She made her debut under Warner Music after she participated in the famous Italian talent show Amici di Maria De Filippi in 2008.

== Life and career ==
Silvia Olari was born in Parma on 17 July 1988 and lives in Fornovo di Taro, a little town near that city, with her parents. When she was only 8 years old she began to study classic piano under Jolanda Degli Innocenti at the music school Il Podio in Noceto (Parma). A year later, in the same school, under Daniela Galli she began to study modern singing. When she was 12 she took part in different provincial and regional events, getting great scores. When she was 14 she began to study lyric technique and singing, and continued for another year and half studying modern singing with her teacher Michela Ollari. In 2002 she changed direction in her musical career, combining together her singing and piano. When she was 17 she studied singing with Stefania Rava.

In 2002 she started to perform away from Parma and reached the semi-final of Festival di Napoli and Accademia di Sanremo. Between 2004 and 2006 she took part in important competitions in the north of Italy, coming first in Una voce per Sanremo in 2005, and again at the following year's Il Cantaestate in Mantova. In 2007 she won first prize at the City Voices in Nozza di Vestone (Brescia), and thanks to this event she attended the Luca Pitteri's singing stage. She took second place at Controfestival in Castelleone (Cremona), won the Publisher song section of 2005's Live Song Festival in Traversetolo (Parma) and in 2007 the critics' prize.

She progressed in the summer of 2007 through the casting stages of the Italian talent show Amici di Maria De Filippi, but at the first show on Canale 5, failed to be admitted.

In November 2007 she participated in the Marcafestival in Treviso, where she was placed third. In December she won the Festivalmare in Forte dei Marmi (Lucca), while in February she took part in the Festival di Ghedi, where she attended a stage with Gatto Panceri. At the end of the show she classified got second place with the song Georgia on my mind, and she won a scholarship for the Hope Music School of Rome.

On 4 October 2008 Silvia Olari again passed all the auditions for the talent show Amici di Maria De Filippi, and at her first public introduction was described as "a unique talent that no one can miss". From the first period on the show she had three songs included in the show's cd compilation album "Scialla". On 4 January she progressed to the next section of the show where all the participants challenged for first place. Unexpectately, Silvia was eliminated on February 18. Despite some critics of the show and one of the show's teacher, Luca Jurman, asking for her readmission, the other participants did not accept this, even though the public had previously expressed in her favour.

After her departure from the Amici di Maria De Filippi, she obtained a recording contract with Warner Music Italy, that had already expressed interest when she still was in the show. Her self-titled first album "Silvia Olari" was released on 10 April 2009. It contained 7 tracks, with two of them having been previously released on the "Scialla" compilation album. The first single from her album, Fino all'Anima, was written by Nek and arranged by Luca Jurman. Jurman also collaborated as musician and arranger for all the cd. In 2009, the debut album was certified silver by the Federation of the Italian Music Industry with sales of over fifteen thousand albums.

== Discography ==
=== Studio albums ===
Year	Album	Peak position
Year	Album	Italian FIMI Albums Chart
2009	Silvia Olari	21
2010	Libera da	37

=== Singles ===
Year	Single	Peak position	Album
Year	Single	Italian FIMI Singles Chart	Album
2009	Fino all'Anima	-	Silvia Olari
2010	Inaccettabile	-	Libera da
2010	Piango per te	-	Libera da
2010	Cenere	-	Libera da

=== Compilations ===
- 2009 – Scialla (with other contestants of Amici)

=== Videography ===
Year	Title	Director	Album
2009	Fino all'Anima	Stefano Bertelli	Silvia Olari
2010	Piango per te		Libera da
