= K. Michelle discography =

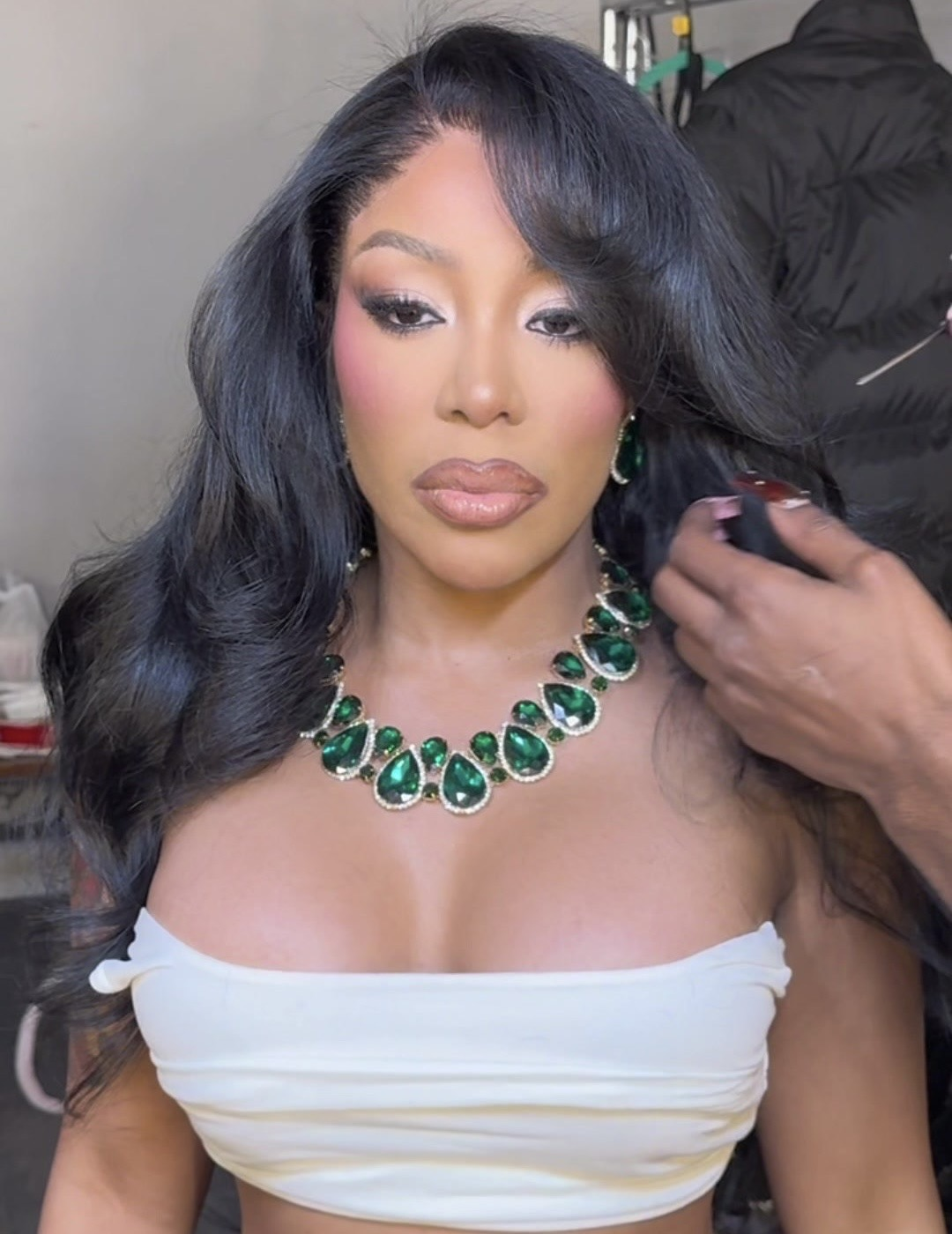
- K. Michelle in 2026
- Studio albums: 7
- Soundtrack albums: 1
- Singles: 35
- Music videos: 45
- EPs: 1
- Mixtapes: 6

American singer-songwriter K. Michelle has released seven studio albums, one soundtrack album, one extended play (EP), six mixtapes, and 35 singles, including nine as a featured artist. Michelle signed with Jive Records in 2009 before joining Atlantic Records in 2012. Her debut studio album, Rebellious Soul (2013), peaked at number two on the US Billboard 200 and topped the Top R&B/Hip-Hop Albums chart. It featured the Billboard Hot 100-charting singles "V.S.O.P." and "Can't Raise a Man". Her second album, Anybody Wanna Buy a Heart? (2014), reached number six on the Billboard 200 and number two on the Top R&B/Hip-Hop Albums chart. It included the RIAA-certified singles "Love 'Em All", "Maybe I Should Call", and "Hard to Do". Her third album, More Issues Than Vogue (2016), peaked at number two on the Billboard 200 and topped the Top R&B/Hip-Hop Albums chart.

Her fourth album, Kimberly: The People I Used to Know, was released in 2017. She left Atlantic Records the following year and released her next two albums, All Monsters Are Human (2020) and I'm the Problem (2023), through Entertainment One. In 2026, she released Jesus & Whiskey, her seventh studio album and first country album.

== Albums ==
=== Studio albums ===
Title	Album details	Peak chart positions				Sales	Certifications
Title	Album details	US	US R&B /HH	US R&B	UK R&B	Sales	Certifications
Rebellious Soul	Released: August 13, 2013; Label: Atlantic; Formats: CD, digital download	2	1	1	—	US: 742,000	RIAA: Gold
Anybody Wanna Buy a Heart?	Released: December 9, 2014; Label: Atlantic; Formats: CD, digital download	6	2	1	—	US: 611,000	
More Issues Than Vogue	Released: March 2, 2016; Label: Atlantic; Formats: CD, digital download	2	1	1	32	US: 298,000	
Kimberly: The People I Used to Know	Released: December 8, 2017; Label: Atlantic; Formats: CD, digital download	56	23	10	—	US: 171,000	
All Monsters Are Human	Released: January 31, 2020; Label: Chase Landin, eOne Music; Formats: CD, digital download	51	29	5	—	US: 63,000	
I'm the Problem	Released: September 22, 2023; Label: Chase Landin, MNRK; Formats: CD, digital download	— (Note: I'm the Problem did not enter the Billboard 200, but peaked at number 69 on the Top Album Sales chart.)	—	—	—	US: 24,000	
Jesus & Whiskey	Released: October 16, 2026; Label: Real Outlawz, BBR; Formats: CD, digital download	—	—	—	—		
"—" denotes a recording that did not chart.

=== Soundtrack albums ===
List of soundtrack albums, with selected chart positions
Title	Album details	Peak chart positions		
Title	Album details	US OST	US R&B /HH	US R&B
The Rebellious Soul Musical	Released: August 13, 2014; Label: Atlantic; Formats: Digital download, streaming	11	28	15

== Extended plays ==
List of extended plays, with track listings
Title	EP details
The Hold Over	Released: June 27, 2013; Label: Atlantic; Format: Digital download, streaming; Track listing: 1. "Million Hearts"; 2. "Wish I Could Be Her"; 3. "Pain Killa"

== Mixtapes ==
List of mixtapes
Title	Album details
What's the 901?	Released: May 30, 2010; Label: Jive; Formats: Digital download
For Colored Girls / Pre-Pain Medicine	Released: December 25, 2010; Label: Jive; Formats: Digital download
Signed, Sealed, Delivered	Released: June 7, 2011; Label: Jive; Formats: Digital download
0 Fucks Given	Released: July 9, 2012; Label: Self-released; Formats: Digital download
Still No Fucks Given	Released: February 14, 2014; Label: Atlantic; Formats: Digital download, streaming
Not 1 Fuck Given	Released: January 1, 2020; Label: Self-released; Formats: Digital download, streaming

== Singles ==
=== As lead artist ===
List of singles, with selected chart positions
Title	Year	Peak chart positions						Certifications	Album
Title	Year	US	US R&B /HH	US R&B	US Adult R&B	KOR (Int.)	NL Urban	Certifications	Album
"Fakin' It" (featuring Missy Elliott)	2009	—	100	*	—	—	—		What's the 901?
"Fallin'"	2010	—	56	*	31	—	—		Non-album singles
"I Just Can't Do This"	2010	—	53	*	—	79	—		Non-album singles
"How Many Times"	2011	—	53	*	—	—	—		Non-album singles
"V.S.O.P."	2013	89	27	8	13	—	44	RIAA: Gold	Rebellious Soul
"Can't Raise a Man"	2013	94	23	13	30	—	74	RIAA: Platinum	Rebellious Soul
"Love 'Em All"	2014	— (Note: "Love 'Em All" did not enter the Billboard Hot 100, but peaked at number 15 on the Bubbling Under Hot 100 chart.)	35	13	—	—	—	RIAA: Platinum	Anybody Wanna Buy a Heart?
"Maybe I Should Call"	2014	—	—	—	—	—	—	RIAA: Gold	Anybody Wanna Buy a Heart?
"Hard to Do"	2015	—	43^{1}	23	—	—	—	RIAA: Gold	Anybody Wanna Buy a Heart?
"Not a Little Bit"	2016	—	30^{1}	18	—	—	—		More Issues Than Vogue
"Mindful"	2016	—	—	—	—	—	—		More Issues Than Vogue
"Ain't You"	2016	—	— (Note: "Ain't You" did not enter the Hot R&B/Hip-Hop Songs, but peaked at number 41 on the R&B/Hip-Hop Digital Songs chart.)	— (Note: "Ain't You" did not enter the Hot R&B Songs, but peaked at number 14 on the R&B Digital Song Sales chart.)	—	—	—		More Issues Than Vogue
"Birthday"	2017	—	—	—	—	—	—		Kimberly: The People I Used to Know
"Either Way" (featuring Chris Brown)	2017	—	—	— (Note: "Either Way" did not enter the Hot R&B Songs, but peaked at number 19 on the R&B Digital Song Sales chart.)	—	—	—		Kimberly: The People I Used to Know
"Make This Song Cry"	2017	—	44^{1}	—	13	—	—		Kimberly: The People I Used to Know
"Crazy Like You"	2018	—	—	—	—	—	—		Kimberly: The People I Used to Know
"Save Me"	2018	—	—	— (Note: "Save Me" did not enter the Hot R&B Songs, but peaked at number 22 on the R&B Digital Song Sales chart.)	—	—	—		Non-album single
"Supahood" (featuring City Girls and Kash Doll)	2019	—	—	—	—	—	—		All Monsters Are Human
"The Rain"	2019	— (Note: "The Rain" did not enter the Billboard Hot 100, but peaked at number 28 on the Digital Song Sales chart.)	25^{1}	17	8	—	—	RIAA: Gold	All Monsters Are Human
"Scooch"	2022	—	18^{1}	—	1	—	—		I'm the Problem
"You"	2023	—	—	—	—	—	—		I'm the Problem
"Wherever the D May Land" (featuring Gloss Up)	2023	—	—	—	—	—	—		I'm the Problem
"Blame Yourself"	2023	—	—	—	—	—	—		I'm the Problem
"Jack Daniel's"	2025	—	—	—	—	—	—		Jesus & Whiskey
"Jesus & Whiskey"	2026	—	—	—	—	—	—		Jesus & Whiskey
"Yodel"	2026	—	—	—	—	—	—		Jesus & Whiskey
"—" denotes a recording that did not chart or was not released in that territory.^{1} denotes a peak on the R&B/Hip-Hop Airplay chart.

=== As featured artist ===
List of singles as featured artist, with selected chart positions
Title	Year	Peak chart positions	Album
Title	Year	US Main. R&B/HH	Album
"Put It In" (Bobby V featuring K. Michelle)	2012	—	Dusk Till Dawn
"If They Knew" (Rick Ross featuring K. Michelle)	2014	33	Hood Billionaire
"Love Me Jeje (Remix)" (Seyi Sodimu featuring K. Michelle)	2016	—	Non-album singles
"Got Me Crazy (No Better Love)" (DJ E-Feezy featuring K. Michelle, Rick Ross and Fabolous)	2017	29	Non-album singles
"Bad Energy" (Safaree featuring K. Michelle)	2017	—	Love Chapter
"If It Ain't Me" (Trina featuring K. Michelle)	2017	—	The One
"Thug Me Like That" (Akbar V featuring K. Michelle)	2018	—	The Coldest Summer
"Party's Over" (Ray J featuring K. Michelle)	2020	—	Emerald City
"Country Love Song" (Justin Champagne featuring K. Michelle)	2023	—	Non-album single
"—" denotes a recording that did not chart.

=== Promotional singles ===
List of promotional singles, with selected chart positions
Title	Year	Peak chart positions		Album
Title	Year	US R&B /HH	KOR (Int.)	Album
"Self Made" (featuring Trina and Gucci Mane)	2009	89	—	What's the 901?
"Kiss My Ass"	2012	— (Note: "Kiss My Ass" did not enter the Hot R&B/Hip-Hop Songs, but peaked at number 50 on the R&B/Hip-Hop Digital Songs chart.)	—	Non-album promotional singles
"I Just Wanna"	2013	—	93	Non-album promotional singles
"Christmas Night"	2013	—	—	Non-album promotional singles
"How Do You Know?"	2014	—	—	Anybody Wanna Buy a Heart?
"Going Under"	2014	—	—	Anybody Wanna Buy a Heart?
"Time"	2016	—	—	More Issues Than Vogue
"Kim K"	2017	—	—	Kimberly: The People I Used to Know
"Tennessee"	2023	—	—	I'm the Problem
"—" denotes a recording that did not chart or was not released in that territory.

== Other certified songs ==
Title	Year	Certifications	Album
"Cry"	2014	RIAA: Gold	Anybody Wanna Buy a Heart?

== Guest appearances ==
List of non-single guest appearances, with other performing artists, showing year released and album name
Title	Year	Other artist(s)	Album
"Echo" (Remix)	2010	R. Kelly	None
"Scream"	2010	Lady	Bitch from Around the Way 2
"Love Is"	2010	R. Kelly	Love Letter
"Take My Body, Lay It Down"	2010	Juicy J	Rubba Band Business, Pt. 1
"No More"	2011	Trina	Diamonds Are Forever
"Powerful"	2011	Crystal Nicole	None
"Rock Wit'cha"	2012	Ruben Studdard	Letters from Birmingham
"Show da World" (Remix)	2014	Lil Boosie	None
"Love Like That"	2015	Jason Derulo	Everything Is 4
"My City"	2016	Yo Gotti	The Art of Hustle
"Forward"	2016	None	The Birth of a Nation: The Inspired By Album
"Baby on the Way"	2016	Nick Cannon	The Gospel of Ike Turn Up
"Throwed"	2019	Yella Beezy	Baccend Beezy
"Love of Your Life"	2020	Rico Love	Rico Love Presents: Emerging Women of R&B
"A Player's Prayer Intro"	2022	Nick Cannon	The Explicit Tape: Raw & B
"Love Can Build a Bridge"	2023	Jelly Roll, The Fisk Jubilee Singers	A Tribute to The Judds

== Music videos ==
List of music videos, showing year released and directors
Title	Year	Director(s)	Ref.
As lead artist
"Where They Do That At"	2009	—N/a	
"Fakin' It" (featuring Missy Elliott)	2009	—N/a	
"Fallin'"	2010	Armen Djerrahian	
"I Just Can't Do This"	2010	—N/a	
"Just Ain't My Day"	2011	Walid Azami	
"How Many Times"	2011	Benny Boom	
"Sweetest Love"	2011	Delante Murphy	
"I Just Wanna"	2013	Amber Gray	
"Half of It"	2013	—N/a	
"V.S.O.P."	2013	Benny Boom	
"I Don't Like Me"	2013	Walid Azami	
"The Right One"	2013	Juwan Lee	
"Christmas Night"	2013	—N/a	
"Can't Raise a Man"	2014	Benny Boom	
"Damn"	2014	Idris Elba	
"Love 'Em All"	2014	—N/a	
"Maybe I Should Call"	2014	—N/a	
"Something About the Night"	2014	Child Basquiat	
"Hard to Do"	2015	Child Basquiat	
"Mindful"	2016	Juwan Lee	
"Not a Little Bit"	2016	Alan Ferguson	
"Got Em Like"	2016	Juwan Lee	
"Ain't You"	2016	—N/a	
"Birthday"	2017	Child Basquiat	
"Fuck Your Man"	2017	Child Basquiat	
"No Not You"	2018	Child Basquiat	
"Crazy Like You"	2018	Child Basquiat	
"Supahood" (featuring City Girls and Kash Doll)	2019	Child Basquiat; Derek Blanks	
"The Rain"	2019	Zachary Greaton	
"Just Like Jay"	2020	Zachary Greaton	
"Scooch"	2022	Derek Blanks	
"You"	2023	Sam Green	
"Wherever the D May Land" (featuring Gloss Up)	2023	—N/a	
"Blame Yourself"	2023	—N/a	
"Tennessee"	2023	—N/a	
"Hurt Shit"	2023	Des Gray	
"Same Damn Show"	2023	Des Gray	
"This Man"	2024	Chelsea Thompson	
"Jesus & Whiskey"	2026	Nikko LaMere	
As featured artist
"Put It In" (Bobby V featuring K. Michelle)	2013	G. Visuals	
"If They Knew" (Rick Ross featuring K. Michelle)	2014	Dre Films	
"Love Me Jeje" (Remix) (Seyi Sodimu featuring K. Michelle)	2016	Sesan Ogunro	
"Got Me Crazy (No Better Love)" (DJ E-Feezy featuring K. Michelle, Rick Ross and Fabolous)	2017	Cinestream Pictures	
"If It Ain't Me" (Trina featuring K. Michelle)	2017	Michael Garcia	
"Thug Me Like That" (Akbar V featuring K. Michelle)	2018	Cricket	
"Country Love Song" (Justin Champagne featuring K. Michelle)	2023	—N/a	
Guest appearances
"Naked" (Jason Derulo)	2016	Jason Derulo	
"Fuck Him" (Nick Cannon)	2018	Nick Cannon	
