= How Do You Know? =

2014 song by K. Michelle

Promotional single by K. Michelle

from the album Anybody Wanna Buy a Heart?
- Released: November 17, 2014
- Length: 3:35
- Label: Atlantic
- Composers: Timothy Bloom; B.A.M.; Lil' Ronnie
- Lyricists: Kimberly Pate; Bianca Atterberry
- Producer: Timothy Bloom

"How Do You Know?" is a song recorded by American singer K. Michelle for her second studio album, Anybody Wanna Buy a Heart? (2014). It was released for digital download and streaming on November 17, 2014 by Atlantic Records as the album's first promotional single. "How Do You Know?" lyrics were written by Michelle and Bianca Atterberry and was composed by Timothy Bloom, B.A.M. and Lil' Ronnie. Bloom produced the track, while B.A.M. and Lil' Ronnie served as additional producers. Upon its release of, music critics were positive towards the track, praising Michelle's voice and the lyrics. To promote the single, Michelle performed the song on The Today Show.

== Background and composition ==
"How Do You Know?" was written by Michelle and Bianca Atterberry and composed by Timothy Bloom, B.A.M. and Lil' Ronnie. The song was produced by Bloom, with additional production by B.A.M. and Ronnie. The track was recorded by C Travis Kr8ts and was mixed by Jaycen Joshua, with assistance from Maddox Chhim and Ryan Kaul. David Kutch mastered "How Do You Know?". "How Do You Know?" was released for digital download and streaming as the first promotional single from Anybody Wanna Buy a Heart? on November 17, 2014 by Atlantic Records. Musically, "How Do You Know?" has been described as a soulful ballad. Lyrically, the song finds a vulnerable Michelle singing about moving on from a past relationship and finding love again. According to the sheet music published at Musicnotes.com by Sony/ATV Music Publishing, the song is performed in the key of Db♯ Major with a vocal range of Ab3-Db5 and a moderately slow tempo of 63 beats per minute. Michelle's vocals span from to F_{2} to B_{3}.

== Critical reception ==
Rap-Up wrote about the song, sayingː "On the impassioned piano ballad, the Memphis songstress tries to move on from the past and find love again, but she has her doubts.". Lloyd Jaffe from HotNewHipHop said that the track "wears its heart on its sleeve". Vixen of Vibe compared the song to Michelle's two other songs from her album, "Love 'Em All" and "Maybe I Should Call" and stated that the song "operates on a piano melody and Michelle's voice, her doing a dance in her head of whether or not her man was the one who caused her the pain". Bradley Stern from Idolator considered that Michelle said "For anyone hoping to hear Miss K. Michelle showcasing her powerhouse chops, this one ought to satisfy." and praised "her irresistible high-pitched vocals and emotional lyrics stand out the most in the piano-driven ballad". During a review for Anybody Wanna Buy a Heart? for PopMatters, Devone Jones said that the song is "probably one of the most dull ballads in recent memory due to the fact that everything is wrong" and said that it sounded like a "failed Mariah moment that had too much effort put into it".

== Credits and personnel ==
Credits were adapted from the liner notes from Anybody Wanna Buy A Heart?

- Kimberly Pate – lyricist
- Bianca Atterberry – lyricist
- Timothy Bloom – production, music
- B.A.M. – additional production, music
- Ronnie "Lil Ronnie" Jackson – additional production, music
- C Travis Kr8ts – recording
- Jaycen Joshua – mixing
- Maddox Chhim – mixing assistantance
- Ryan Kaul – mixing assistantance
- David Kutch – mastering
