= Drake Would Love Me =

R&B song recorded by K. Michelle

Song by K. Michelle

from the album Anybody Wanna Buy a Heart?
- Released: December 2, 2014
- Genre: R&B
- Length: 4:19
- Label: Atlantic
- Composers: Oak Felder; Ronald "Flippa" Colson; Stephen Mostyn
- Lyricists: Kimberly Pate; Bianca Atterberry
- Producers: Oak Felder; Ronald "Flippa" Colson; Steve Ace

"Drake Would Love Me" is an R&B song recorded by American singer K. Michelle for her second studio album, Anybody Wanna Buy a Heart? (2014). It was written by Michelle and Bianca Atterberry. Its music and production came from Oak Felder, Ronald "Flippa" Colson, and Stephen Mostyn. Atlantic Records initially released the song via streaming on VH1's website on December 2, 2014, before it became available with the rest of the album the following week.

The song concerns an imaginary romance with Canadian rapper Drake. Described by critics as fan fiction, it was inspired by Michelle's perception of how Drake's female fans responded to him. The title attracted attention when the album's track listing was announced the month before its release. Several critics praised "Drake Would Love Me" and highlighted Michelle's humor, but others criticized her decision to dedicate a love song to Drake.

== Background and release ==
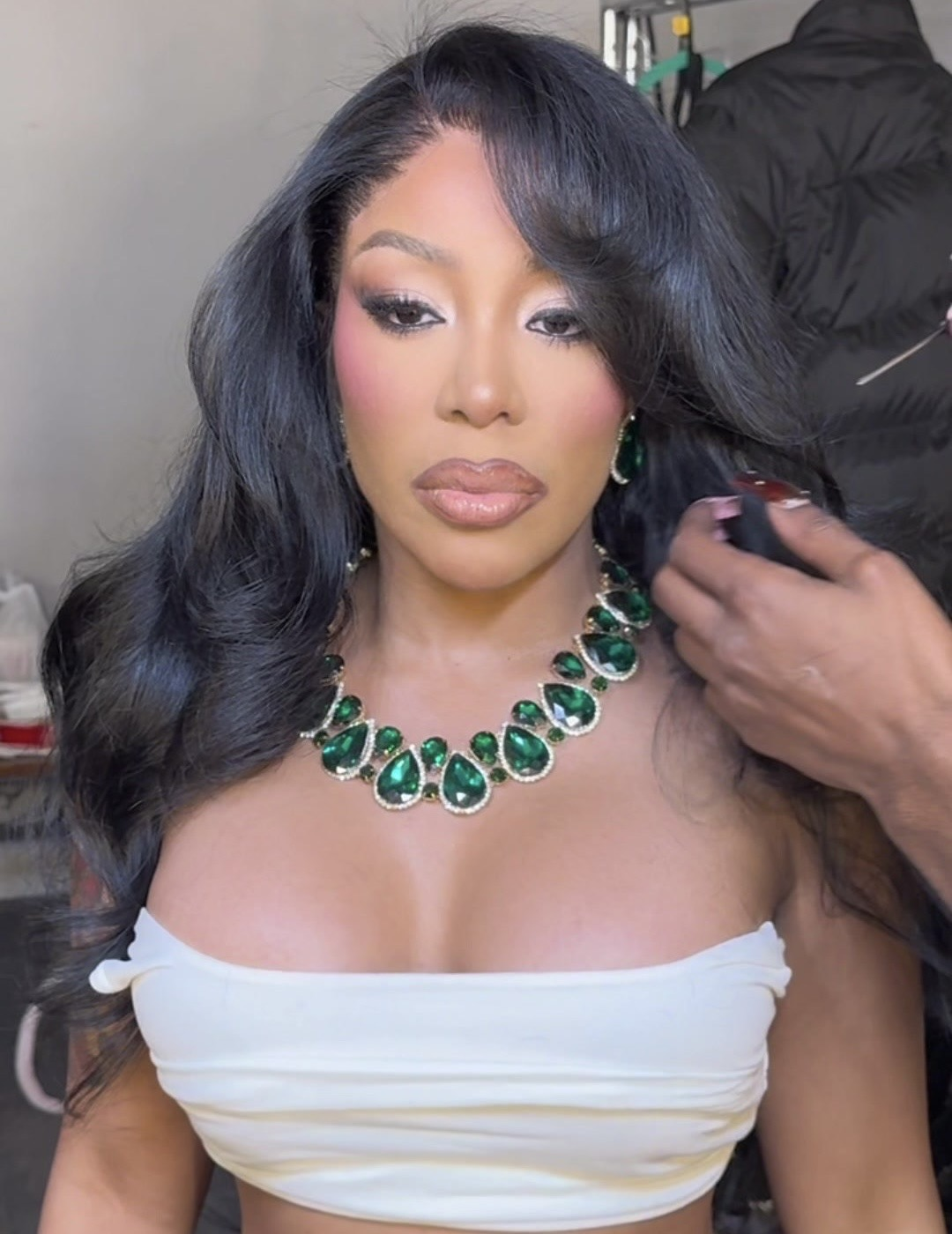
K. Michelle co-wrote the song following a conversation women had in the recording studio about Drake.

Kimberly Michelle Pate wrote "Drake Would Love Me" with Bianca Atterberry for Anybody Wanna Buy a Heart?, her second studio album. Ronald "Flippa" Colson, Oak Felder, and Stephen Mostyn were in charge of the music. While in the recording studio, Michelle heard women idolizing Canadian rapper Drake and recorded the song as a response. She was also inspired by how Drake's fans fantasize that he would fall in love with them. When asked about Drake's popularity, she responded that he was humble, released more love songs than other men, and was especially respectful to women in his music. Drake's appeal with women has been discussed by media outlets. According to a 2010 Spin article, Drake had "opened up an enormous young female fanbase" early in his rap career, and Much's Andi Crawford and Brianne James attributed the reason women respond to his music to his "delicate tempos and emotionally charged lyrics".

Although much of Michelle's music is autobiographical, she clarified in a 2014 interview with The Breakfast Club that she only had a platonic relationship with Drake. Before its release, she played the song to Drake to obtain his approval; he responded: "You’re crazy as shit, but it’s a great record." While the track is about Drake, Michelle said her relationship with ex-boyfriend Idris Elba was the primary inspiration for the album.

Felder, Colson, and Steve Ace produced the song. Michelle's vocals were recorded by C Travis Kr8ts and produced by Atterberry, with assistance from Felder. Donnie Meadows and Tanisha Broadwater were the production coordinators for the song. The track was mixed by Jaycen Joshua, with assistance from Maddox Chhim and Ryan Kaul, and it was mastered by David Kutch.

When the album's track listing was unveiled on November 3, 2014, media outlets identified "Drake Would Love Me" as a point of interest due to its title. The song debuted via streaming on VH1's website on December 2, 2014, and Atlantic Records released it as a part of Anybody Wanna Buy a Heart? a week later. Michelle uploaded the song to her YouTube account on February 13, 2017, as part of an Anybody Wanna Buy a Heart? playlist.

== Music and lyrics ==
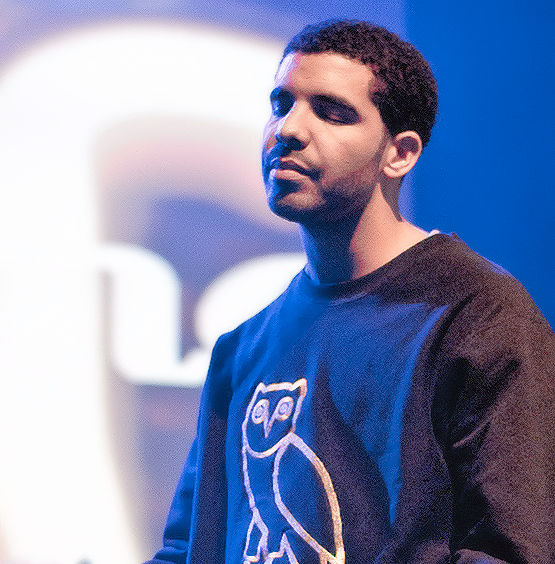
The lyrics describe an imaginary romance with Drake.

"Drake Would Love Me" is a four-minute, 19-second R&B song, performed in the style of a ballad and a slow jam. The piano-driven track opens with a melody that MTV News' Rob Markman characterized as soothing; as it progresses, guitar licks and violins are incorporated into the instrumentation.

The song's lyrics describe an imagined romance with Drake. The situations mentioned include Michelle attending the Grammy Awards with Drake and her being hated by his groupies. Based on this lyrical content, critics associate "Drake Would Love Me" with fan fiction. Time's Nolan Feeney jokingly said it is restrained compared to Amanda Bynes' tweet about wanting Drake to "murder [her] vagina". In the lyrics "Drake wouldn't leave me, he would keep me, never break his promises / I'd be the best he ever had, he'd be on his best behavior / He would make me so proud / Drake would love me", Michelle references the titles of Drake's singles "Best I Ever Had", "Worst Behavior", and "Make Me Proud". According to a Music Times contributor, the lyrics represent how Drake's music often focuses on emotional subject matters. Michelle listed Drake's positive attributes, singing he would "always be the same" and "play no games" and would not lie or make her cry; Feeney compared the rhyme scheme for these lyrics to the writing style of Dr. Seuss.

The album's final three songs ("Build a Man", "Drake Would Love Me", and "God I Get It") are interpreted by critics as forming a story on Michelle's ideas on love. Describing the songs as Michelle's attempt to "reconcile her need to love hard with the reality of the men she encountered", The Quietus writer Alex Macpherson said she turns to Frankenstein and fan fiction for answers on love in "Build a Man" and "Drake Would Love Me" before accepting her own flaws in "God I Get It". Renowned for Sound's Meggie Morris identified "Drake Would Love Me" as a continuation of "Build a Man" as both explore her perceptions of the perfect man. While The Boston Globe's Ken Capobianco wrote that "Drake Would Love Me" represented the album's "honesty, defiance, and sensuality", Emily Laurence of Metro New York singled it out as an example that "not all the songs are intensely emotion-filled".

== Critical reception ==
Several reviewers enjoyed "Drake Would Love" even though it differed from their initial expectations. In USA Today, Martín Caballero wrote "don't ask us how or why [but the song] works"; he praised it as an "anthemic big-stadium R&B ballad". Although he expected something "funny or cocky", A.D. Amorosi, writing for The Philadelphia Inquirer, highlighted the track for its focus instead on unrequited love. Other critics believed said the song displayed Michelle's humor. In the Ottawa Citizen, Mesfin Fekadu said she was "clever and hilarious", and Meggie Morris described her performance as "charmingly amusing". Ken Capobianco commended Michelle for emoting a level of "vulnerability and rubbed-raw tension rarely heard in R&B today", which he considered a reason for her popularity. Pitchfork's Alfred Soto praised "Drake Would Love Me" for its sense of urgency, and believed it had her best vocals.

The Washington Post's Chris Richards thought it was "mildly radioactive" for Michelle to release a track explicitly about a crush on another singer. In Jezebel, Kara Brown also professed being uncomfortable about the track, panning it as the "musical equivalent of trying to stop your friend from sending a third drunk text to that guy she kinda hooked up with a month ago". Brown said the lyrics adhere more to Drake's image as the ideal boyfriend than his actual behavior toward women. Drake has received criticism from some media outlets for his music being misogynistic and for his interactions with girls. Michael Arceneaux, while writing for Complex, said listeners would recognize the song's idealization of Drake as false, and while he praised Michelle's vocals, he described her as sounding too much like a fan. In The Fader, a writer described the track as "just plain weird" and "saccharine sonic fan-fiction".

== Credits and personnel ==
Credits were adapted from the liner notes from Anybody Wanna Buy A Heart?:

- Kimberly Pate – lyricist
- Bianca Atterberry – lyricist, vocal production
- Donnie Meadows – production coordination
- Tanisha Broadwater – production coordination
- Oak Felder – production, music, additional recording
- Ronald "Flippa" Colson – production, music
- Stephen Mostyne – production, music
- C Travis Kr8ts – recording
- Jaycen Joshua – mixing
- Maddox Chhim – mixing assistantance
- Ryan Kaul – mixing assistantance
- David Kutch – mastering
