= I'm the Problem =

I'm the Problem may refer to:

- I'm the Problem (K. Michelle album), 2023 album by K. Michelle
- I'm the Problem (Morgan Wallen album), 2025 album by Morgan Wallen
- "I'm the Problem" (song), title track of the album of the same name by Morgan Wallen

== See also ==
- Maybe I'm the Problem, a 2018 stand-up release by Dan Cummins
- "Anti-Hero" (song), a 2022 song by Taylor Swift
