= My Twisted Mind Tour =

2015 concert tour by K. Michelle

- Concert by K. Michelle
- Associated album: Anybody Wanna Buy a Heart?
- Start date: February 5, 2015
- End date: March 12, 2015

K. Michelle concert chronology
- Rebellious Soul Tour (2013); My Twisted Mind Tour (2015); Hello Kimberly Tour (2016)

The My Twisted Mind Tour was the second concert tour by American recording artist, K. Michelle. The tour began in February 2015 and continued throughout the year. The tour was in support of her second album, Anybody Wanna Buy a Heart?, which achieved large success in the United States, peaking at number six on the Billboard 200 and selling 120,000 copies to date.

== Background ==
Following the release of her second studio album, Anybody Wanna Buy a Heart?, in December 2014, Michelle announced the My Twisted Mind Tour in January 2015. The tour was organized in support of the album, which debuted at number six on the Billboard 200 and number two on Billboard's Top R&B/Hip-Hop Albums chart. Its singles included "Love 'Em All", "Maybe I Should Call", and "Something About the Night".

The tour was initially announced as a 12-city trek, with additional dates expected to be revealed. Michelle's announcement described the tour as an opportunity to present her music and personal perspective onstage. In a statement accompanying the announcement, she wrote: "I will create a world that is full of love, and positivity. A world where people embrace what's unique about you, and not what's wrong with u." She further explained that her "twisted mind" represented a place free from outside judgment, concluding, "I am judged by the honesty in my voice, and the creativity of my thoughts. My TWISTED MIND is safe, MY STAGE." The tour followed Michelle's previous headlining Rebellious Soul Tour in 2013 and her appearance as a special guest on Robin Thicke's Blurred Lines Tour in 2014. The former was presented by BET Music Matters, while the latter accompanied Thicke during his touring in support of his album Blurred Lines.

The first part of the tour began on February 5, 2015, at the Mezzanine in San Francisco. Additional performances were subsequently scheduled in cities across the United States, including Greensboro, Raleigh, Charlotte, Rochester, and Atlanta.

== Tour dates ==
Date	City	Country	Venue
February 5, 2015	San Francisco	United States	The Mezzanine
February 6, 2015	Beverly Hills	United States	Saban Theatre
February 13, 2015	Orlando	United States	Bob Carr Performing Arts Centre
February 15, 2015	Baton Rouge	United States	River Center Theatre
February 16, 2015	Baltimore	United States	Rams Head
February 20, 2015	Shreveport	United States	Strand Theatre
February 21, 2015	Greenville	United States	Convention Center
February 22, 2015	Greensboro	United States	Cone Denim Center
February 25, 2015	Raleigh	United States	The Ritz
February 26, 2015	Charlotte	United States	The Fillmore
February 27, 2015	Myrtle Beach	United States	House of Blues
March 5, 2015	Cincinnati	United States	National Theatre
March 6, 2015	Indianapolis	United States	The Music Hall
March 7, 2015	Rochester	United States	Auditorium Theatre
March 8, 2015	Seattle	United States	The Showbox SoDo
March 12, 2015	Atlanta	United States	Fox Theatre
