= Brandon Hodge =

American producer, songwriter, and multi-instrumentalist

Brandon Alexander Hodge
- Also known as: B.A.M., BAM, B-Lex, Brandon Alexander
- Origin: Hartford, Connecticut, United States
- Genres: R&B, soul, hip-hop
- Occupations: Songwriter; producer; guitarist
- Years active: 2010–present

Brandon Hodge is an American R&B producer and songwriter known for his production/songwriting work with TGT members Tyrese Gibson and Tank, as well as writing and/or producing R&B hits "No Limit", "Love 'Em All", "U + Me (Love Lesson)", and "Lean Into It".

== Songwriting and production career ==
Discovered in the late 2000s by Rihanna producers Carl Sturken and Evan Rogers who had formed a joint-venture publishing agency with Universal Music Publishing Group and were looking for songwriters, Hodge was quickly signed to a publishing deal alongside artist Shontelle. In 2011, Hodge executive-produced Gibson's album Open Invitation, co-writing and producing minor R&B hit singles "Stay", "Too Easy", and "Best of Me", ultimately creating 12/14 songs on the original project. Hodge was nominated alongside Gibson for the project in the Best R&B Album category (as main producer) at the 55th Annual Grammy Awards.

In 2016, Hodge co-wrote and co-produced "No Limit", the lead single for Usher's project Hard II Love. The single peaked in the top 10 of the R&B charts and Top 40 on the Billboard Hot 100, becoming Hodge's biggest hit to date. After contributing five songs to 2016 Tank album Sex Love & Pain II, Hodge was commissioned for Tank's weekly-summer-release EP project #TankTuesdays, producing first installment "No Drugs", second installment "For Life", and third installment "All About You". In 2017, Hodge was praised by pop culture publication Vulture for his numerous "current but faintly retro" creations on Mary J. Blige album Strength of A Woman, describing his work (as well as the contributions of fellow producer Darhyl Camper) as "tasteful but buoyant, [and] right on time without necessarily straining to conform to the times."

In 2023, Hodge produced Gibson single "Don’t Think You Ever Loved Me" featuring musicians Lenny Kravitz and Le'Andria Johnson, which climbed into the Top 10 on Billboard’s Adult R&B Airplay Chart, becoming Gibson's first top 10 hit in nearly seven years. Hodge-produced single "Love Transaction" followed several months later, debuting in the Top 30 of the Adult R&B Airplay Chart.

== Selected songwriting and production credits ==
Credits are courtesy of Discogs, Tidal, Spotify, and AllMusic.

Title	Year	Artist	Album	Label
"Amazing"	2010	Tank	Now or Never	Atlantic Records
"Make It"	2010	Arika Kane	Arika Kane	BSE Recordings
"Bcuz I Luv U"	2010	Arika Kane	Arika Kane	BSE Recordings
"4 The Lovers"	2010	Arika Kane	Arika Kane	BSE Recordings
"Drink the Kool-Aid"	2010	Ice Cube	I Am the West	Lench Mob / EMI / Caroline Records
"Get It Right" (featuring Taraji P. Henson)	2011	Mary J. Blige	My Life II... The Journey Continues (Act 1)	Geffen Records
"I Wish"	2013	Lyfe Jennings	Lucid	Mass Appeal / Fontana
"College"	2013	Lyfe Jennings	Lucid	Mass Appeal / Fontana
"ABC's" (featuring Phoenix & Elijah Jennings)	2013	Lyfe Jennings	Lucid	Mass Appeal / Fontana
"No Fun" (featuring Problem)	2013	TGT	Three Kings	Atlantic Records
"Sex Never Felt Better"	2013	TGT	Three Kings	Atlantic Records
"I Need"	2013	TGT	Three Kings	Atlantic Records
"Explode"	2013	TGT	Three Kings	Atlantic Records
"FYH"	2013	TGT	Three Kings	Atlantic Records
"Running Back"	2013	TGT	Three Kings	Atlantic Records
"Love 'Em All"	2014	K. Michelle	Anybody Wanna Buy a Heart?	Atlantic Records
"Cry"	2014	K. Michelle	Anybody Wanna Buy a Heart?	Atlantic Records
"How Do You Know?"	2014	K. Michelle	Anybody Wanna Buy a Heart?	Atlantic Records
"Build a Man"	2014	K. Michelle	Anybody Wanna Buy a Heart?	Atlantic Records
"God I Get It"	2014	K. Michelle	Anybody Wanna Buy a Heart?	Atlantic Records
"Autumn Leaves" (featuring Kendrick Lamar)	2014	Chris Brown	X	RCA Records
"What's Best For You"	2014	Trey Songz	Trigga	Songbook / Atlantic Records
"Congratulations"	2015	Ne-Yo	Non-Fiction	Compound / Motown
"Who's Gonna (Nobody)"	2015	Chris Brown	Royalty	CBE / RCA Records
"Shoulda Been There" (featuring B.o.B)	2015	Sevyn Streeter	Shoulda Been There, Pt. 1	CBE / Atlantic Records
"Chaise Lounge"	2015	Tamia	Love Life	Plus One / Def Jam Recordings
"Free Fallin'"	2015	Tamar Braxton	Calling All Lovers	Epic / Streamline Records
"Would You Know?"	2015	August Alsina	This Thing Called Life	Def Jam Recordings
"Song Cry"	2015	August Alsina	This Thing Called Life	Def Jam Recordings
"Other Side"	2015	August Alsina	This Thing Called Life	Def Jam Recordings
"No Limit" (featuring Young Thug)	2016	Usher	Hard II Love	RCA Records
"Lean Into It"	2016	Joe	My Name Is Joe Thomas	Plaid Takeover / BMG
"Worth It"	2016	Young Thug	Slime Season 3	300 / Atlantic Records
"She With the Shit" (featuring Rich Homie Quan)	2016	Tank	Sex Love & Pain II	R&B Money / Atlantic Records
"I Love Ya" (featuring Yo Gotti)	2016	Tank	Sex Love & Pain II	R&B Money / Atlantic Records
"So Cold"	2016	Tank	Sex Love & Pain II	R&B Money / Atlantic Records
"Already in Love" (featuring Shawn Stockman)	2016	Tank	Sex Love & Pain II	R&B Money / Atlantic Records
"Him Her Them"	2016	Tank	Sex Love & Pain II	R&B Money / Atlantic Records
"No Drugs"	2016	Tank	#TankTuesdays	R&B Money / Atlantic Records
"For Life"	2016	Tank	#TankTuesdays	R&B Money / Atlantic Records
"All About You"	2016	Tank	#TankTuesdays	R&B Money / Atlantic Records
"U + Me (Love Lesson)"	2017	Mary J. Blige	Strength of a Woman	Capitol Records
"It's Me"	2017	Mary J. Blige	Strength of a Woman	Capitol Records
"Indestructible"	2017	Mary J. Blige	Strength of a Woman	Capitol Records
"Survivor"	2017	Mary J. Blige	Strength of a Woman	Capitol Records
"Strength of a Woman"	2017	Mary J. Blige	Strength of a Woman	Capitol Records
"The Naked Truth"	2017	Mary J. Blige	Strength of a Woman	Capitol Records
"Love in the Middle"	2017	Mary J. Blige	Strength of a Woman	Capitol Records
"Incredible"	2017	Bell Biv DeVoe	Three Stripes	eOne
"All The Lovers"	2020	K. Michelle	All Monsters Are Human	eOne
"Ciara's Prayer"	2020	K. Michelle	All Monsters Are Human	eOne
"G Wagon" (featuring Sevyn Streeter & Tkay Maidza)	2022	Babyface	Girls Night Out	Capitol Records
"Fast Car"	2022	Syd	Broken Hearts Club	Columbia Records
"Don't Cheat"	2023	Jeezy	I Might Forgive... But I Don't Forget	CTE World
"Luckiest Man"	2024	Usher	Coming Home	Mega / Gamma

=== Executive-produced projects ===
Albums with more than 50% B.A.M. production credits, showing year released and album name
Album	Artist	Year	Label
Open Invitation	Tyrese Gibson	2011	Voltron / EMI Records
Black Rose	Tyrese Gibson	2015	Voltron / Caroline Records

== Awards and nominations ==
Year	Ceremony	Award	Result	Ref
2013	55th Annual Grammy Awards	Best R&B Album (Open Invitation)	Nominated	
2017	BMI R&B/Hip-Hop Awards	Most-Performed Songs ("No Limit")	Won	
