= Going Under =

Going Under may refer to:

== Film and television ==
- Going Under (1991 film), a comedy film starring Bill Pullman and Dean Cain
- Going Under (2004 film), a drama film starring Geno Lechner and Roger Rees
- Going Under, the working title of Once Upon a Time in Venice, a 2016 comedy film starring Bruce Willis, Jason Momoa, and John Goodman
- "Going Under" (Prison Break), a season four episode of Prison Break
- "Going Under" (CSI: Miami), an episode of CSI: Miami

== Music ==
- "Going Under" (Evanescence song), 2003
- "Going Under" (K. Michelle song), 2014
- "Going Under", a song by Andromeda from their 2006 album Chimera
- "Going Under", a song by Patti Smith from her 1988 album Dream of Life
- "Going Under", a song by Devo from their 1981 album New Traditionalists
- "Going Under", a song by Rockers Hi-Fi
- "Going Under", the B-side song to Marillion's "Incommunicado" from the Clutching at Straws album
- "Going Under (Didn't Have To)", 2014 song by Australian country music trio the McClymonts from their Here's To You & I album
- "Going Under" is a 2007 single off the Even Heroes Need a Parachute album by Christian rock bank This Beautiful Republic
- "Going Under", single off the 2006 Human Nature album by Canadian hard rock band Harem Scarem
- "Going Under", a song by Wallows from their 2024 album Model

== Video games ==
- Name This Game, a 1982 video game for Atari 2600, honorarily renamed Going Under by a contest in 1994
- Going Under (video game), a 2020 roguelike video game developed by Aggro Crab

== Other ==
- Going Under, a 1996 novel by Virgil Suárez
