= Ruby (Macy Gray album) =

Studio album by Macy Gray
- Released: September 21, 2018
- Studio: Various
- Genre: R&B
- Length: 43:22
- Label: Mack Avenue
- Producer: Macy Gray; Johan Carlsson; Thomas Lumpkins; Tommy Brown

Macy Gray chronology
Stripped (2016)	Ruby (2018)

Singles from Ruby
- 1. "White Man" Released: 2017; 2. "Sugar Daddy" Released: June 11, 2018

Professional ratings
Review scores
Source	Rating
All About Jazz	4/5 stars
The Detroit News	B
Exclaim!	8/10
The Sydney Morning Herald	4/5 stars
The Spill Magazine	5/5 stars
PopMatters	8/10

Ruby is the tenth studio album recorded by American singer-songwriter Macy Gray. Originally scheduled to be released on September 7, 2018 via Mack Avenue label, it was pushed back to September 21, 2018. The album also produced two singles.

== Recording ==
The recording locations were 25th Street Studios, Oakland, CA; 3 Pillars Studio, Woodland Hills, CA; MXM Studios, Los Angeles, CA; Recon Studios, Tarzana, CA; Revival Studio, Los Angeles, CA; Studio Borgen, Partille, Sweden; VieTom Studios, Beverly Hills, CA.

== Reception ==
Kyle Mullin of Exclaim! commented "Her chemistry with her bandmates, along with the album's producers, is evident. And there's little wonder why — Ruby gleams like a pristinely produced jewel in comparison to Gray's aptly named 2016 LP Stripped, which consisted of raw, overdub free takes for the singer and a small band". Simone Torn of The Spill Magazine stated "This album is appropriately called Ruby, because it’s a pure gem. Whoever says music has lost all soul clearly has never heard Gray’s new album".

Pablo Gorondi of The Detroit News wrote, "Macy Gray sounds mainly joyful and enthusiastic on Ruby and the zest evident across her 10th album, even when the theme is misfortune or heartbreak, is infectious. Her trademark jazzy soul and R&B foundations are accounted for, but the arrangements have a deceptively light touch and let Gray’s vocals and effervescent personality shine through".

== Track listing ==
No.	Title	Writer(s)	Producer(s)	Length
1.	"Buddha"	Macy Gray; Johan Carlsson	Carlsson	4:11
2.	"Cold World"	Gray; Thomas Lumpkins; Kelly Lumpkins	T. Lumpkins	3:06
3.	"Over You"	Gray; T. Lumpkins; Carlsson	Carlsson	3:46
4.	"White Man"	Gray; T. Lumpkins; Bianca Atterberry; Michael Foster; Ryan Tedder; Tommy Brown; Travis Sayles	T. Lumpkins; Brown	3:13
5.	"Tell Me"	Gray; Carlsson; Rama Duke; Mika Lett; Phillip Anthony White	Carlsson	3:30
6.	"Sugar Daddy"	Gray; T. Lumpkins; Atterberry; Brown; Meghan Trainor	Carlsson	3:38
7.	"When It Ends"	Gray; T. Lumpkins; Scott Bruzenak; Britten Newbill	T. Lumpkins; Gray	4:42
8.	"Just Like Jenny"	Gray; T. Lumpkins; Atterberry; Brown	T. Lumpkins; Brown	2:58
9.	"Jealousy"	Gray; Carlsson; Ross Golan	Carlsson	3:49
10.	"Shinanigins"	Gray; T. Lumpkins; Atterberry; Tahmel Hinds; Trevor Lawrence Jr.	T. Lumpkins; Gray	2:42
11.	"But He Loves Me"	Gray; Tamir Barzilay; Jonathan Jackson Jr.	Carlsson	3:41
12.	"Witness"	Gray; Austin Brown; Anton Göransson; Viktoria Hansen; Isabella Sjöstrand	T. Lumpkins; T. Brown	4:16
Total length:				43:22

== Charts ==
Chart (2018)	Peak position
Swiss Albums (Schweizer Hitparade)	41
