= Bianca Atterberry =

American songwriter and producer

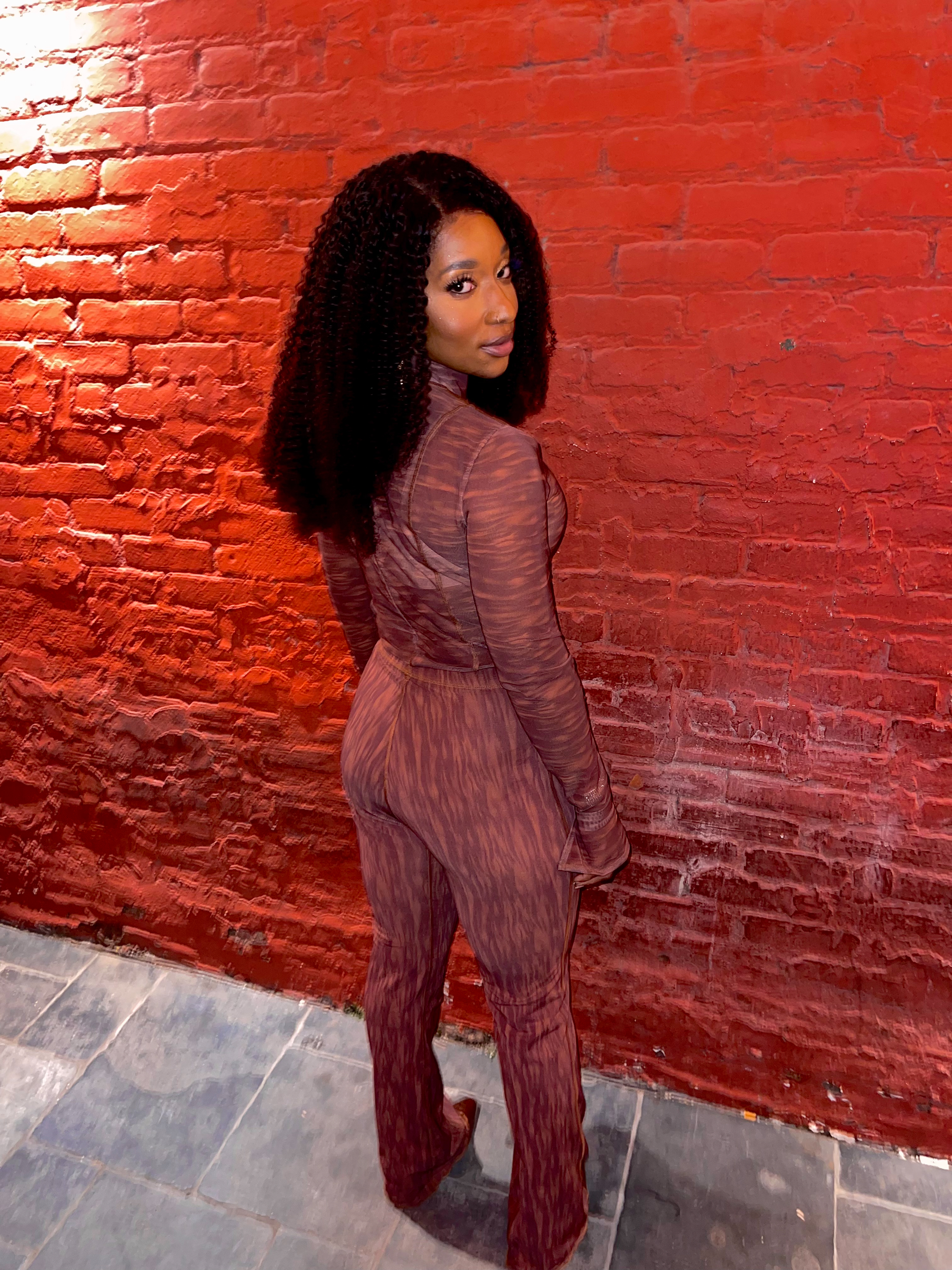
- Atterberry in 2022

Background information
- Also known as: Blush, Blushwrites
- Born: Bianca Deiandra Atterberry; September 30, 1988 (age 38); Meridian, Mississippi, U.S.
- Occupation: Songwriter
- Website: hernameisblush.com

Bianca Deiandra Atterberry, also known by her stage name Blush, is an American songwriter. Atterberry has co-written for Demi Lovato, Blackpink, K. Michelle, Mary J. Blige, Macy Gray, Meghan Trainor, and Kid Cudi, among others. She co-wrote Lovato's 2021 single "Dancing With The Devil", which entered the Billboard Hot 100, as well as three additional tracks from its parent album Dancing with the Devil... the Art of Starting Over (2021).

== Career ==
=== Early life ===
Atterberry moved frequently in her childhood, as her mother was a member of the United States Armed Forces, residing in New Jersey and Mississippi before finally settling in Pittsburgh, Pennsylvania. While there, Atterberry attended the Pittsburgh High School for Creative and Performing Arts, and performed with the Pittsburgh Festival Opera. At 19, she decided to pursue a music career after being offered the opportunity to participate in the Emmy Award-winning soundtrack from Fly Boys: Western Pennsylvania's Tuskegee Airmen. Atterberry said, “I left home, quit my post office job, and got in the car to move to Georgia. That is what really started the journey within the industry.”

=== Songwriting ===
Atterberry's most prolific collaborator has been Atlantic Records artist K. Michelle, writing, producing, and/or vocal producing on her four major-label albums (Rebellious Soul (2013), Anybody Wanna Buy a Heart? (2014), More Issues Than Vogue (2016), and Kimberly: The People I Used to Know (2017)), as well as three unofficial mixtapes and a Christmas EP. Atterberry stated that "[their] musical chemistry was amazing. We loved to be creative and have a good time." In 2018, Atterberry co-wrote single "Sugar Daddy" alongside singer-songwriter Meghan Trainor, placing the song on Macy Gray's album Ruby. The song charted on the Billboard Adult R&B Chart for several weeks. In 2020, Atterberry wrote the song "Enough is Enough" for the ESPN documentary highlighting the 2020 WNBA season. In 2022, Atterberry contributed single "Hard To Love" to Blackpink's album Born Pink.

=== Advocacy ===
Early in her career, Atterberry became temporarily homeless after signing an early publishing contract which did not compensate her for her writing contributions. She stated in an article for BuzzFeed News that over the years she has never made enough money from a song to receive her advance, meaning she has “never seen a publishing check.” Her passion for songwriter advocacy motivated her to join organization "The 100 Percenters", who lobby for songwriters to get access to publishing, additional songwriting fees, and other benefits for those that are stuck in outdated publishing contracts. They offer resources for artists to take advantage of, and strive to make the music industry a safe and fair place. Atterberry is an instructor for "1500 Sound Academy: The Contemporary Songwriter", a course currently offered at Arizona State University.

=== Personal life ===
She credits her son, Niko, as her primary inspiration and motivation. He was diagnosed with Autism, a developmental disorder that affects one in 44 children.

== Discography ==
Credits are courtesy of Discogs, Tidal, Apple Music, and AllMusic.

=== Guest appearances ===
List of guest appearances, with other performing artists, showing year released and album name
Title	Year	Other performer(s)	Album
"Anything"	2026	K. Michelle	Jesus & Whiskey

=== Songwriting credits ===
Title	Year	Artist	Album
"Handle It"	2010	Jessica Mauboy	Get 'Em Girls
"How To Love"	2010	Tynisha Keli	The 5th Element
"Kiss My Ass"	2012	K. Michelle	0 F**** Given (Mixtape)
"Bury My Heart"	2012	K. Michelle	0 F**** Given (Mixtape)
"My Life"	2013	K. Michelle	Rebellious Soul
"Damn"	2013	K. Michelle	Rebellious Soul
"I Don't Like Me"	2013	K. Michelle	Rebellious Soul
"Pay My Bills"	2013	K. Michelle	Rebellious Soul
"Sometimes"	2013	K. Michelle	Rebellious Soul
"Ride Out"	2013	K. Michelle	Rebellious Soul
"Hate On Her"	2013	K. Michelle	Rebellious Soul
"When I Get A Man"	2013	K. Michelle	Rebellious Soul
"Christmas Night"	2013	K. Michelle	Christmas Night
"Gotta Get Mine" (featuring Bridget Kelly)	2013	Ai	Moriagaro
"Judge Me"	2014	K. Michelle	Anybody Wanna Buy a Heart?
"Love 'Em All"	2014	K. Michelle	Anybody Wanna Buy a Heart?
"Going Under"	2014	K. Michelle	Anybody Wanna Buy a Heart?
"Cry"	2014	K. Michelle	Anybody Wanna Buy a Heart?
"How Do You Know?"	2014	K. Michelle	Anybody Wanna Buy a Heart?
"Hard to Do"	2014	K. Michelle	Anybody Wanna Buy a Heart?
"Maybe I Should Call"	2014	K. Michelle	Anybody Wanna Buy a Heart?
"Something About the Night"	2014	K. Michelle	Anybody Wanna Buy a Heart?
"Miss You, Goodbye"	2014	K. Michelle	Anybody Wanna Buy a Heart?
"Build a Man"	2014	K. Michelle	Anybody Wanna Buy a Heart?
"Drake Would Love Me"	2014	K. Michelle	Anybody Wanna Buy a Heart?
"God I Get It"	2014	K. Michelle	Anybody Wanna Buy a Heart?
"Silhouettes"	2014	K. Michelle	Anybody Wanna Buy a Heart?
"Get In My Bed"	2014	K. Michelle	Anybody Wanna Buy a Heart?
"Baby Mama"	2014	K. Michelle	Still No F**** Given (Mixtape)
"Run These Streets"	2014	K. Michelle	Still No F**** Given (Mixtape)
"Tomorrow Too Late"	2014	K. Michelle	Still No F**** Given (Mixtape)
"Put You Up On Game"	2014	K. Michelle	Still No F**** Given (Mixtape)
"Whatever"	2014	K. Michelle	Still No F**** Given (Mixtape)
"10 Minutes With God"	2014	K. Michelle	Still No F**** Given (Mixtape)
"Language Barrier"	2014	Keke Palmer	VH1 Single Ladies S3
"On the Run"	2015	Neon Hitch	24:00
"Sleep Like a Baby"	2016	K. Michelle	More Issues Than Vogue
"Friends"	2016	Meghan Trainor	Thank You
"No Pressure"	2016	Pia Mia	Non-album single
"No Not You"	2017	K. Michelle	Kimberly: The People I Used to Know
"Everything In Me"	2017	Sevyn Streeter	Girl Disrupted
"Bad Dream"	2018	Exo	Don't Mess Up My Tempo
"You" (featuring Teyana Taylor)	2018	T.I.	Dime Trap
"White Man"	2018	Macy Gray	Ruby
"Sugar Daddy"	2018	Macy Gray	Ruby
"Just Like Jenny"	2018	Macy Gray	Ruby
"Shinanigins"	2018	Macy Gray	Ruby
"Good Times" (featuring Buddy Guy)	2018	Mario	Dancing Shadows
"Magic in the Hamptons" (featuring Lil Yachty)	2018	Social House	Non-album single
"Wish I Could Be Her"	2018	K. Michelle	The Hold Over
"Tell Em"	2019	Sabrina Carpenter	Singular: Act II
"Take Off"	2019	Fantasia	Sketchbook
"Find Me"	2019	Taeyeon	Purpose
"Yeah Yeah Yeah"	2019	WayV	Take Over the Moon
"Love Song"	2020	NCT 127	Neo Zone
"Honeymoon Fades"	2020	Sabrina Carpenter	Non-album single
"A Moment"	2020	RILEY	RILEY (EP)
"Kickin' Pushin'"	2020	Destiny Rogers	Great Escape
"Dancing with the Devil"	2021	Demi Lovato	Dancing with the Devil... the Art of Starting Over
"ICU (Madison's Lullabye)"	2021	Demi Lovato	Dancing with the Devil... the Art of Starting Over
"15 Minutes"	2021	Demi Lovato	Dancing with the Devil... the Art of Starting Over
"Sunset"	2021	Demi Lovato	Dancing with the Devil... the Art of Starting Over
"It's All Good"	2021	Demi Lovato	Unreleased
"Say A Prayer" (featuring YG)	2021	Demi Lovato	Unreleased
"Skeletons"	2021	Bluprint	Bluprint (EP)
"Feel Alright"	2021	JoJo	Trying Not to Think About It
"Don't Stop"	2021	Donny Osmond	Start Again
"Enough"	2022	Mary J. Blige	Good Morning Gorgeous
"Hard to Love"	2022	Blackpink	Born Pink
"Blackberry Sap"	2022	Ari Lennox	D-Day: A Gangsta Grillz Mixtape
"Kissing New People" (Featuring Ty Dolla Sign)	2023	Maeta	When I Hear Your Name
"Wasn't Ready"	2023	The New Six	Love Never Dies EP
"What It Is (Block Boy)" (Featuring Kodak Black)	2023	Doechii	—N/a
"Is This Love"	2024	XG	Awe
"Work It Out"	2024	Joe Jonas	Music for People Who Believe in Love
"Taste"	2025	Coco Jones	Why Not More?
"Grace"	2025	Cynthia Erivo	I Forgive You
"Mirror to the Sky"	2025	Jonas Brothers	Greetings from Your Hometown
"Deep Diving"	2025	Kid Cudi	Free
"Submarine"	2025	Kid Cudi	Free
"Grave"	2025	Kid Cudi	Free
"Past Life"	2025	Kid Cudi	Free
"Joshua Tree"	2025	Demi Lovato	It's Not That Deep
"High Key"	2026	Ari Lennox	Vacancy
"Gut Punch"	2026	Nick Jonas	Sunday Best
"Too Easy"	2026	Tinashe	POPSTAR
"I'd Rather Be Alone"	2026	Tinashe	POPSTAR
"Pillow Fight"	2026	Tinashe	POPSTAR

== Filmography ==
†	Denotes works that have not yet been released

Year	Film	Role	Notes	Ref.
2021	Coming 2 America	Choir	Music Department	
2023	White Men Can't Jump	Background Vocalist	Music Department	

== Awards and nominations ==
Year	Work	Award	Result	Ref
2021	"Unspeakable" Short Film	Mid-Atlantic Emmy Awards (Music Composition)	Nominated	
2023	Good Morning Gorgeous (Deluxe)	Grammy Award for Album of the Year	Nominated	
