= Sugar Daddy (Macy Gray song) =

2018 song by Macy Gray

"Sugar Daddy" is a song co-written and recorded by singer Macy Gray. It was released on 11 June 2018. The song was co-written with Meghan Trainor, Bianca Atterberry, Tommy Brown and Thomas Lumpkins. This track appears on the 2018 album Ruby.

== Chart performance ==
"Sugar Daddy" reached a peak of number 21 on the Billboard Adult R&B Airplay chart for the week of August 8, 2018.

== Music video ==
The official music video for "Sugar Daddy" stars Macy Gray as a lounge singer, and Evan Ross co-stars as a slick nightclub patron. "Sugar Daddy" was created as a tribute to Billie Holiday biopic Lady Sings the Blues, which stars Diana Ross. It was directed by Christian Lamb and premiered in 2018 on BET Soul and BET Her.

=== Cast ===
- Macy Gray as Lounge Singer
- Evan Ross as Slick Nightclub Patron / Billy
- Carmit Bachar as Waitress
- Don Guido as Club Owner
- Miranda Barrie as Burlesque Performer

== Charts ==
Chart (2018)	Peak position
US Adult R&B Airplay (Billboard)	21
