= Hard to Do =

Single by K. Michelle

from the album Anybody Wanna Buy a Heart?
- Released: March 31, 2015
- Genre: Soul; trap
- Length: 3:58
- Label: Atlantic
- Composers: Derek Blythe; Soundz
- Lyricists: K. Michelle; Bianca Atterberry; Maurice Simmonds; Julian Jackson; Brian James; Janice Johnson; Raphael Saadiq
- Producer: Soundz

K. Michelle singles chronology
"Maybe I Should Call" (2014)	"Hard to Do" (2015)	"Not a Little Bit" (2016)

"Hard to Do" is a song by American singer K. Michelle from her second studio album Anybody Wanna Buy a Heart? (2014). The song was released on March 31, 2015 as the fourth single from the album. It was written by K. Michelle, Bianca Atterberry, Maurice Simmonds, Julian Jackson, Brian James, Janice Johnson, and Raphael Saadiq, and was produced by American record producer Soundz. "Hard to Do" is a soul ballad with lyrics revolving around missing a partner following a break-up and the desire to have sex with them. One commentator noted that the single's melody was reminiscent of American girl group Total's single "Kissin' You" from their 1996 self-entitled album.

Critical response to "Hard to Do" was positive, with music critics highlighting its content and Michelle's vocals. It peaked at number 23 on the Hot R&B Songs Billboard chart. To promote the single, a music video was released on May 18, 2015, through VH1. In the video, Michelle performs the track with various exotic animals while dressed in risqué clothing. Critics positively responded to the video, with Michelle's sexual image receiving attention. Michelle performed "Hard to Do" at the BET Awards 2015, as part of a set with American singers Tamar Braxton and Patti LaBelle, and at the Power 107 Bash.

== Recording and release ==
"Hard to Do" was written by K. Michelle, Bianca "Blush" Atterberry, Maurice Simmonds, Julian Jackson, Brian James, Janice Johnson, and Raphael Saadiq, and it was produced by American record producer Soundz. Derek Blythe performed the guitar on the track; the vocals were produced by Atterberry and recorded by C Travis Kr8ts, with additional assistance from Jared Lynch and the Soundz. The track was mixed by Jaycen Joshua, with assistance from Maddox Chhim and Ryan Kaul, and mastered by David Kutch.

On March 31, 2015, "Hard to Do" was released to urban contemporary radio as the third single from Michelle's second studio album Anybody Wanna Buy a Heart? (2014); it was put forth as a single following her previous releases "Love 'Em All" and "Maybe I Should Call".

== Composition and lyrics ==
"Hard to Do" is a soul ballad that lasts three minutes and 58 seconds. Mike Wass of Idolator viewed the track as "retro-leaning". Sarah Godfrey of The Washington Post felt that the single's melody had the "slightest resemblance" to American girl group Total's single "Kissin' You" from their 1996 self-entitled album. When describing the similarity in sound, Godfrey wrote that Michelle had purposefully made listeners feel more comfortable with the album's "more experimental R&B" direction by "eas[ing] [them] into the sound by borrowing whispers of popular songs and fusing them to her work".

The song's lyrics revolve around how Michelle misses her partner and wishes to have sex with them. The chorus consists of Michelle singing: "Missing you is hard to do / I'd rather be fucking you." Other lyrics include: "Lately I've been in my feelings, dealing with the daily thoughts of missing you". Elias Leight and Steven J. Horowitz of Billboard interpreted the single as focusing on "the regret of a breakup".

== Reception ==
Upon its release, "Hard to Do" received positive reviews from music critics. Sarah Godfrey praised the single as "uniquely beautiful", and a writer from The Rickey Smiley Show identified it as the strongest track from the album. Mike Wass positively responded to Michelle's vocals on "Hard to Do", and described the song as "another gripping, intensely autobiographical (and explicit) ballad".

On June 6, 2015, "Hard to Do" peaked at number 23 on the Hot R&B Songs Billboard chart, and remained on the chart for seven weeks. When discussing the single's commercial performance, Maurice Simmonds said: "Even though the record was a single[,] I feel that it wasn’t pushed hard enough."

== Music video ==
Throughout the music video, Michelle performs the song in scenes with various exotic animals. Emily Tan of The Boombox interpreted the focus on animals as representative of Michelle "getting in touch with her primal senses".

The music video for "Hard to Do" was exclusively released on VH1 on May 18, 2015, before being made available on other digital platforms the next day. It premiered after an episode of American reality television series Love & Hip Hop: New York. Prior to its release, Michelle had uploaded a fifteen-second teaser to her Instagram account, which featured her various costumes. When describing the video, the singer wrote: "Rebels!!! I'm feeling SUPER excited about the #HardToDo video! Stepping out the box for this one, and it's never felt better!" On April 28, 2015, Michelle also released a photo of herself posing in a bathtub while wearing a thong and fishnets; Mike Wass called it an "eye-popping, pulse-quickening glimpse".

In the video directed by Child Basquiat, Michelle wears revealing clothing while accompanied by various animals. She sings with a zebra in a white room while dressed in a striped bodysuit, and performs in a bathtub surrounded by flamingos while wearing only a black thong and pink feathers. Michelle is also shown wrestling and kissing a woman in the mud in the middle of a rainstorm. The music video received positive attention from critics due to Michelle's sexuality, with Mike Wass calling it the sexiest video of 2015. Emily Tan of The Boombox wrote that the singer chooses to follow a "playful route" and "channels her wild side" through the release. Tan interpreted the video's emphasis on animals as connected to the song's sexual content and how Michelle "get[s] in touch with her primal senses". A writer from Singersroom felt that the ending of the video hinted at Michelle's bisexuality, and a contributor for Rap-Up described the video as "avant-garde".

== Live performances ==
Michelle performed "Hard to Do" at the BET Awards 2015, along with American singers Tamar Braxton and Patti LaBelle. As part of the performance, Braxton also sang her 2015 single "If I Don't Have You" and the three artists performed LaBelle's 1983 single "If Only You Knew". The performance was noted by media outlets as ending the rivalry between Braxton and Michelle; Braxton said: “Life is all about forgiveness, love, and unity, so tonight, I’m sorry K. Michelle, and I also forgive you.” The two artists previously had disagreements after Braxton joked about Michelle's allegations that she was physically abused by her ex-boyfriend. A writer for BET described the performance as a "battle of the ballads". Michelle also sang "Hard to Do" during the Power 107 Bash on August 1, 2015. Diana Renee Williams of The Augusta Chronicle praised Michelle's performance, writing that it "showcas[ed] her relevance on the R&B music scene and solidif[ied] her talent as a solo artist".

== Credits and personnel ==
Credits were adapted from the liner notes from Anybody Wanna Buy A Heart?:

- Kimberly Pate – lyricist
- Bianca Atterberry – lyricist, vocal production
- Soundz – production, music, additional recording
- Brion James – lyricist
- Janice Johnson – lyricist
- Julian Jackson – lyricist
- Maurice Simmonds – lyricist
- Raphael Saadiq – lyricist
- Derek Blythe – guitar, music
- C Travis Kr8ts – recording
- Jared Lynch – additional recording
- Jaycen Joshua – mixing
- Maddox Chhim – mixing assistantance
- Ryan Kaul – mixing assistantance
- David Kutch – mastering

== Charts ==
Chart (2015)	Peak position
US Hot R&B Songs (Billboard)	23
US R&B/Hip-Hop Airplay (Billboard)	43

== Certifications ==
Region	Certification	Certified units/sales
United States (RIAA)	Gold	500,000^{‡}
^{‡} Sales+streaming figures based on certification alone.
