= Anybody Wanna Buy a Heart? =

Studio album by K. Michelle
- Released: December 9, 2014
- Recorded: 2013–2014
- Genre: R&B
- Length: 48:25
- Label: Atlantic
- Producers: Lil Ronnie; Pop & Oak; J. Schmugge; Shea Taylor; Berzy Berzy & G-Eron; Eric Hudson; Andrew "Hitdrew" Clifton; Jesse "Corparal" Wilson

K. Michelle chronology
Rebellious Soul (2013)	Anybody Wanna Buy a Heart? (2014)	More Issues Than Vogue (2016)

Singles from Anybody Wanna Buy a Heart?
- 1. "Love 'Em All" Released: September 16, 2014; 2. "Maybe I Should Call" Released: November 3, 2014; 3. "Hard to Do" Released: March 31, 2015

Anybody Wanna Buy a Heart? is the second studio album by American singer-songwriter K. Michelle, released on December 9, 2014, through Atlantic Records as the follow-up to Rebellious Soul (2013). Primarily an R&B album, it incorporates elements of pop and country music, with lyrics exploring love, heartbreak, and romantic relationships. Production was handled by several collaborators, including Pop & Oak, Eric Hudson, Lil' Ronnie, and Shea Taylor.

The album produced three singles: "Love 'Em All", "Maybe I Should Call", and "Hard to Do". Released on September 16, 2014, "Love 'Em All" peaked at number 35 on the US Hot R&B/Hip-Hop Songs chart. "Maybe I Should Call" followed on November 3, while "Hard to Do" was released on March 31, 2015. Michelle further promoted the album with the My Twisted Mind Tour, which began in San Francisco on February 5, 2015, and continued across the United States.

Anybody Wanna Buy a Heart? received generally positive reviews from music critics. Commercially, the album debuted at number six on the US Billboard 200, earning 87,000 album-equivalent units in its first week. It also debuted at number two on the US Top R&B/Hip-Hop Albums chart.

== Background and development ==
Michelle released her debut studio album Rebellious Soul on August 13, 2013. The album debuted at number two on the Billboard 200 and number one on the Top R&B/Hip-Hop Albums chart. In February 2014, she released Still No Fucks Given, a 26-track mixtape hosted by DJ Sense and a follow-up to her earlier mixtape 0 Fucks Given. She also opened for Robin Thicke on the North American leg of his Blurred Lines Tour and collaborated with actor Idris Elba, who directed The Rebellious Soul Musical, a VH1 special featuring songs from her debut album that aired in August 2014. While discussing her forthcoming second album in October, Michelle described herself as a classically trained pianist who also played guitar, produced and composed music, and said the project would include country and acoustic recordings alongside her other material. For months, Michelle used the hashtag #AWBAH without initially revealing its meaning. On October 29, she announced that the initials stood for Anybody Wanna Buy a Heart?. Pre-orders for the album began on November 3, alongside the premiere of her VH1 reality television series K. Michelle: My Life. In a December interview with Billboard, Michelle described the album as different from Rebellious Soul, while The Washington Post reported that she had said the project was inspired by her relationship with Elba.

== Singles ==
"Love 'Em All" was released on September 16, 2014, as the lead single from Anybody Wanna Buy a Heart?. Its music video premiered via VH1 on November 3, and features Michelle performing choreography with a chair and backup dancers, dancing among male mannequins, and singing from a throne. The song peaked at number 35 on Billboard's Hot R&B/Hip-Hop Songs chart, number 13 on its Hot R&B Songs chart, and number 26 on its R&B/Hip-Hop Airplay chart.

"Maybe I Should Call" was released on November 3, 2014, as the album's second single and made available as an instant download with pre-orders of the album. Its lyric video premiered on November 10, followed by the official music video on November 17. Directed by Iren Sheffield Brown, the short film depicts Michelle as an unseen presence observing a former partner as he builds a new life with another woman and their baby. She appears in their car, at their dinner table, and in their bedroom before awakening alone.

"Hard to Do" was released as to urban radio as the third single on March 31, 2015. Its Child Basquiat-directed music video, which premiered on May 18, features Michelle in various outfits alongside a zebra and flamingos, including a bathtub scene and a sequence in which she rolls in mud with a female companion. The song peaked at number 23 on Billboard's Hot R&B Songs chart and number 43 on its R&B/Hip-Hop Airplay chart.

=== Other songs ===
"How Do You Know?" was released on November 17, 2014, as the first promotional single and made available as an instant download to customers who pre-ordered the album. The second promotional single, "Going Under" followed on November 24 as another pre-release from the album.

The music video for "Something About the Night" premiered on December 9, 2014, the day the album was released. Directed by Child Basquiat, the cinematic video depicts Michelle performing as a nightclub singer in a period setting inspired by Billie Holiday and the 1972 film Lady Sings the Blues. The story opens with her drinking before a performance and follows her onstage with a live band and backing singers.

== Critical reception ==
Professional ratings
Review scores
Source	Rating
AllMusic	4.5/5 stars
Complex	3.5/5 stars
The Philadelphia Inquirer	3.5/5 stars

Upon its release, Anybody Wanna Buy a Heart? received positive reviews. The Washington Post called it "a great album", stating that K. Michelle "continues to distinguish herself from her reality television peers, who seem to stay in the studio but never release music — let alone good music." Billboard deemed it one of 2014's best R&B albums, writing, "There's a serrated ferocity to K. Michelle that sends her songs past saccharine territory and into compelling unstable territory."

Complex rated the album 3.5 stars out of 5: "...[W]hile it may have taken her longer than she'd like to make this known, it cannot be denied any longer: K. Michelle is leaps and bounds ahead of many of her peers." Rolling Stone listed Anybody Wanna Buy a Heart? as one of the top 20 R&B albums of 2014. The Philadelphia Inquirer gave Anybody Wanna Buy a Heart? 3.5 of our four stars, writing, "...[t]his powerhouse tenor vocalist, pianist, and songwriter also is capable of great tenderness, nuance, and understatement."

== Commercial performance ==
Upon its release, Anybody Wanna Buy a Heart? reached number one on iTunes' R&B/Soul Albums chart. The album debuted at number six on the US Billboard 200 chart dated December 27, 2014, earning 87,000 album-equivalent units in its first week, including 84,117 copies sold. It also debuted at number two on the US Top R&B/Hip-Hop Albums chart, making it Michelle's second consecutive number-one album on the chart. The album also peaked at number one on Billboard's Top R&B Albums chart. The album achieved the highest-selling first-week debut for a female R&B artist in the United States in 2014.

== Track listing ==
Anybody Wanna Buy a Heart? – Standard edition
No.	Title	Lyrics	Music	Producer(s)	Length
1.	"Judge Me"	Kimberly Pate; Bianca Atterberry	Curtis Wilson; Jerrold Wizzard; Jesse Wilson	C. Wilson; J. Wilson; Atterberry^{[a]}	3:08
2.	"Love 'Em All"	Pate; Atterberry	B.A.M.; Ronnie Jackson; Shea Taylor	Taylor; Atterberry^{[a]}; B.A.M.^{[b]}; Jackson^{[b]}	4:05
3.	"Going Under"	Pate; Atterberry; Clifton Chase; Edward Fletcher; Melvin Glover; Sylvia Robinson	Ronald Colson; Warran Felder; Geoffrey Richard	Colson; Felder; Atterberry^{[a]}; Richard^{[c]}; Kevin Guardado^{[c]}	3:45
4.	"Cry"	Pate; Atterberry; Balewa Muhammad	B.A.M.; Jackson; John T. Smith; Phillip Cornish	B.A.M.; Jackson; Atterberry^{[a]}	4:45
5.	"How Do You Know?"	Pate; Atterberry	B.A.M.; Jackson; Timothy Bloom	Bloom; B.A.M.^{[c]}; Jackson^{[c]}	3:35
6.	"Hard to Do"	Pate; Atterberry; Brian James; Janice Johnson; Julian Jackson; Maurice Simmonds; Raphael Saadiq	Derek Blythe; Kenneth Coby	Soundz; Atterberry^{[a]}	3:58
7.	"Maybe I Should Call"	Pate; Atterberry; Guordan Banks	Eric Hudson; Andrew Clifton	Hudson; Atterberry^{[a]}	3:28
8.	"Something About the Night"	Pate; Atterberry	Colson; Felder; Steve Mostyn	Colson; Felder; Mostyn; Atterberry^{[a]}; Guardado^{[c]}	3:30
9.	"Miss You, Goodbye"	Pate; Atterberry; Muhammad	James Harris III; Terry Lewis; Erik Ortiz; Kevin Crowe; Kenny Bartolomei	J.U.S.T.I.C.E. League; Atterberry^{[a]}	3:05
10.	"Build a Man" (includes "Build a Man" intro)	Pate; Atterberry; Stacy Barthe	J. Wilson	J. Wilson; B.A.M.; Jackson; Atterberry^{[a]}	6:02
11.	"Drake Would Love Me"	Pate; Atterberry	Colson; Felder; Mostyn	Colson; Felder; Mostyn; Atterberry^{[a]}	4:19
12.	"God I Get It"	Berzy; Atterberry	B.A.M.; Jackson; Jerry Duplessis; Cornish; Arden Altino	B.A.M.; Jackson; Duplessis; Atterberry^{[a]}; Cornish^{[b]}; Altino^{[b]}	4:38
Total length:					48:25

Anybody Wanna Buy a Heart? – Best Buy edition
No.	Title	Lyrics	Music	Producer(s)	Length
13.	"Silhouettes"	Pate; Atterberry; Theron Thomas; Timothy Thomas	Harvey Mason Jr.; David L. Stewart; Damon Thomas	The Underdogs; Atterberry^{[a]}; Stewart^{[b]}	3:33
14.	"Get in My Bed"	Berzy; Aron "G-Eron" Buscarini; Atterberry	Luca Masini; Travis Kr8ts	Masini; Kr8ts; Atterberry^{[a]}	3:02
Total length:					55:00

Notes

- ^{^[a]} signifies a vocal producer
- ^{^[b]} signifies a co-producer
- ^{^[c]} signifies an additional producer

Sampling credits

- "Going Under" samples elements of "The Message", written by Clifton Chase, Edward Fletcher, Melvin Glover and Sylvia Robinson.
- "Hard to Do" samples elements of "Kissin' You", written by Brian James, Janice Johnson, Julian Jackson, Maurice Simmonds and Raphael Saadiq.

== Charts ==
=== Weekly charts ===
Weekly chart performance for Anybody Wanna Buy a Heart?
Chart (2014)	Peak position
US Billboard 200	6
US Top R&B/Hip-Hop Albums (Billboard)	2

=== Year-end charts ===
Year-end chart performance for Anybody Wanna Buy a Heart?
Chart (2015)	Position
US Billboard 200	147
US Top R&B/Hip-Hop Albums (Billboard)	17
