= Going Under (K. Michelle song) =

2014 song by K. Michelle

Promotional single by K. Michelle

from the album Anybody Wanna Buy a Heart?
- Released: November 24, 2014
- Genre: R&B
- Length: 3:53
- Label: Atlantic
- Songwriters: Kimberly Pate; Bianca Atterberry; Clifton Chase; Edward Fletcher; Geoffrey "Cuzzo" Richard; Melvin Glover; Ronald Colson; Sylvia Robinson; Warren Felder
- Producers: Flippa; Oak

"Going Under" is a song by American singer K. Michelle from her second studio album, Anybody Wanna Buy a Heart? (2014). The song was released as the album's second promotional single by Atlantic Records on November 24, 2014. It was written by Michelle and Bianca Atterberry while Its production was handled by Flippa and Oak, with additional production by Geoffrey "Cuzzo" Richard.

A song about romantic uncertainty and the desire to find lasting love, "Going Under" incorporates a reference to the refrain of Grandmaster Flash and the Furious Five's 1982 song "The Message". Its lyrics describe the emotional strain of a relationship and the prospect of being without a partner.

== Background and composition ==
"Going Under" was released as the second promotional single from Anybody Wanna Buy a Heart? on November 24, 2014. Michelle sings about her search for genuine love, quoting the lyrics in which she asks who will support her and make an effort on her behalf. Rap-Up wrote that Michelle "fights to keep love alive" on the song.The Boombox characterized the song as an upbeat track despite its subject matter, noting that Michelle expresses anxiety about being single while leaving open the possibility of finding love again.

"Going Under" has a duration of 3 minutes and 53 seconds, with a tempo of 143 beats per minute (BPM) and written in the key of E-flat major. Its production features a synthesizer-driven groove and prominent percussion. The song's refrain references the lyric "it's like a jungle sometimes, it makes me wonder how I keep from going under" from Grandmaster Flash and the Furious Five's "The Message" (1982). The song was written by Michelle, alongside Bianca Atterberry, while Flippa, and Warren Felder served as its producers. Additional production was provided by Geoffrey "Cuzzo" Richard. The production and engineering credits also identify Bianca "Blush" Atterberry and Dallas Martin as executive producers, with Michelle also serving as an executive producer.

== Critical reception ==
Ivory Jeff Clinton of Rated R&B described the song as emotionally conflicted and highlighted its use of the refrain from "The Message" over a synthesizer-driven groove. Clinton included it among the album's standout tracks. Devone Jones of PopMatters identified "Going Under" as one of its more effective tracks. Jones wrote that the song addresses Michelle's desire to be in love without becoming overly sentimental and noted that she acknowledges her flaws without excessive vocal embellishment. Jones further contrasted the song with other tracks on Anybody Wanna Buy a Heart? that Jones considered less successful. Mesfin Fekadu of Associated Press described the song as catchy and addictive.

== Track listing ==
Digital single
No.	Title	Length
1.	"Going Under"	3:53

== Credits and personnel ==
Credits adapted from the Atlantic Records digital-single credits for "Going Under".

Vocals

- K. Michelle – vocals

Songwriting

- Kimberly Pate – songwriting
- Bianca Atterberry – songwriting
- Ronald Colson – songwriting
- Warren Felder – songwriting
- Clifton Chase – songwriting
- Edward Fletcher – songwriting
- Geoffrey "Cuzzo" Richard – songwriting
- Melvin Glover – songwriting
- Sylvia Robinson – songwriting

Production and engineering

- Flippa – production
- Oak – production, recording engineering
- Bianca "Blush" Atterberry – executive production, vocal production
- C Travis Kr8ts – recording engineering
- Dallas Martin – executive production
- David Kutch – mastering
- Donnie Meadows – production coordination
- G Spot – recording engineering
- Geoffrey "Cuzzo" Richard – additional production
- Jaycen Joshua – mixing
- Kimberly Pate – executive production
- Kevin "Batos" Guardado – production assistance
- Maddox Chhim – assistant mixing
- Ryan Kaul – assistant mixing
- Tanisha Broadwater – production coordination

== Release history ==
Release history
Region	Date	Format	Label
United States	November 24, 2014	Digital download	Atlantic Records
