= All Monsters Are Human =

Studio album by K. Michelle
- Released: January 31, 2020
- Recorded: 2018–2019
- Genre: R&B
- Length: 49:07
- Label: eOne
- Producers: Ayo The Producer; Keyz; Jazze Pha; Lee Major; Lil' Ronnie; Drumma Boy; BongoByTheWay; Raymond komba; Phillip Cornish; Damon Thomas; Xeryus L. Gittens

K. Michelle chronology
Kimberly: The People I Used to Know (2017)	All Monsters Are Human (2020)	I'm the Problem (2023)

Singles from All Monsters Are Human
- 1. "Supahood" Released: September 20, 2019; 2. "The Rain" Released: October 25, 2019

All Monsters Are Human (stylized in all caps) is the fifth studio album by American singer-songwriter K. Michelle, released on January 31, 2020. The album was originally scheduled for release on December 6, 2019, but was delayed. It was preceded by the release of two singles, "Supahood" (featuring Yung Miami of City Girls and Kash Dolll) and "The Rain".To promote the album, Michelle embarked on the O.S.D. Tour in 2019.

== Background and writing ==
On June 26, 2018, Michelle said via Twitter that her next album would be titled "All Monsters Are Human". On October, Michelle announced that she would instead be calling her next project FAB, an acronym for "Fuck All U Bitches". On November 19, 2018, Michelle released the song "Save Me". It was later announced that she had signed a new record deal with Entertainment One Music. In July 2019, Michelle then confirmed that her fifth album would be officially titled "All Monsters Are Human".

During a radio interview with Morning Hustle, Michelle explained the meaning behind the title: "Everybody in here is a villain to somebody and in somebody's story, you're not an angel... So All Monsters Are Human, we all have been hurt and hurt so that's where the title comes from because we always say you are this and that but you're the same thing to someone else so if you see it in me it's in you for you to even notice it."

== Critical reception ==
Professional ratings
Review scores
Source	Rating
AllMusic	4/5 stars
The Guardian	2/5 stars
Tom Hull – on the Web	B+

Andy Kellman of AllMusic described the album as consistent with K. Michelle’s established catalog in its lyricism, sound, and overall quality, despite being produced on a presumably tighter budget following her move to eOne after multiple releases with Atlantic. He noted that she continues working with familiar collaborators such as Ronnie Jackson and Brandon Hodge, alongside newer contributions from Aaron Sledge, and that she makes strong use of the album format to explore personal and interpersonal themes with a mix of wit, candor, vulnerability, and conviction. Kellman highlighted tracks like “Just Like Jay,” which offers raw introspection, and “I Don’t Like You,” a ballad balancing grace and spite, as well as other standout cuts including “Ciara’s Prayer,” “All the Lovers,” and “Can’t Let (You Get Away),” which range from slow jams to trap-influenced production and reflect the album’s stylistic variety.

Chris Malone of Forbes noted that, as a former reality TV star, K. Michelle has long been open about her personal life, a trait that continues throughout All Monsters Are Human. He described the album as another extension of her increasingly personal discography, following earlier releases such as Anybody Wanna Buy a Heart?, More Issues Than Vogue, and Kimberly: The People I Used to Know. He praised emotionally driven songs such as “Ciara’s Prayer” and “I Don’t Like You,” as well as more radio-friendly material like “Love On Me,” and concluded that the album is “an otherwise solid offering.”

Rachel Aroesti of The Guardian said the album “centers on the slick, soulful, 80s-style R&B that has provided the foundation for K. Michelle’s career.” She described Michelle’s vocals as “rich and glassy,” noting they are “coated in the kind of vocoder effect that makes them glitch and ripple nauseatingly.”

Antwaine Folk of Rated R&B praised the album’s nostalgic approach, writing that K. Michelle “took a fresh and even nostalgic turn that finds her remaining very much her own artist.” He also noted that it is “easy to listen to All Monsters Are Human and love each record without skipping one,” adding that several tracks encourage repeat listens and that each song “should be praised back-to-back for their separate glory.”

Brittany Burton of Respect wrote that All Monsters Are Human is “by far K. Michelle’s biggest release to date,” highlighting the “effortless production” as its most notable element.

== Singles ==
The lead single from the album, “Supahood”, featuring American rappers City Girls and Kash Doll, was released on September 20, 2019. It is an R&B track with trap and crunk influences, described by critics as a “fierce ladies night anthem” and a “street anthem”.

The second single from the album, "The Rain", produced by Jazze Pha, was released on October 25, 2019. It is an R&B track that later received a gold certification. The song peaked at number 28 on the US Digital Song Sales chart, number 25 on the US R&B/Hip-Hop Airplay chart, and number 8 on the US Adult R&B Songs chart, becoming K.Michelle’s first top 10 entry on the latter.

== Commercial performance ==
All Monsters Are Human was released on January 31, 2020. Following the album's release, it debuted at number 51 on the US Billboard 200 with first week sales of 8,200 copies.

== Track listing ==
All Monsters Are Human track listing
No.	Title	Writer(s)	Producer(s)	Length
1.	"Just Like Jay"	Clinton Peacock; Jeremiah “Sickpen” Bethea; Kimberly Pate; Philip Lynah; Rafael D. Ishman; Ronnie Jackson	Lil Ronnie	4:56
2.	"That Game"	Christopher “Drumma Boy” Gholson; Cory Moore; Melvin Riley Jr.; Phalon Alexander	Drumma Boy	3:50
3.	"The Rain"	Pate; Alexander; James Harris III; Rafael Ishman; Cory Moore; Terry Lewis	Jazze Pha	3:29
4.	"All the Lovers"	Aaron Sledge; Ayaamii Sledge; Brandon Hodge; Pate	Brandon "B.A.M." Hodge; Aaron Sledge	3:33
5.	"Something New"	Peacock; Eric Crawford; Pate; Lynah; Ishman; Jackson	Lil Ronnie	3:53
6.	"Ciara's Prayer"	Sledge; Sledge; Hodge; Pate	Brandon "B.A.M." Hodge; Aaron Sledge	4:18
7.	"OMG"	Gabrielle Nowee; Pate; RAYMOND "ray keys" Komba; Uforo “Bongo” Ebong	BongoByTheWay; Ray Keys ByTheWay	3:35
8.	"Supahood" (featuring Kash Doll and City Girls)	Pate; Arkeisha Knight; Caresha Brownlee	Lil Ronnie	3:32
9.	"Love on Me"	Sledge; Sledge; DeMario Bridges; Johnny Mollings; Pate; Leigh Elliott; Lenny Mollings; Sean Momberger	Lee Major; Sean Momberger	3:24
10.	"I Don't Like You"	Sledge; Sledge; Pate; Philip Cornish; Rio Bridges	Phillip Cornish	2:56
11.	"Table for One"	Daniel Bryant; Crawford; Jeremiah “Sickpen” Bethea; Pate; Lynah; Ishman; Jackson	Lil Ronnie; Daniel "Retro D" Bryant	4:06
12.	"Can't Let (You Get Away)"	Austin “Ayo” Owens; Crawford; James “Keyz” Foye III; Jeremiah Bertha; Jackson	Lil' Ronnie	3:57
13.	"The Worst"	Damon Thomas; Pate; Sha Sha Jones	Damon Thomas	3:58
Total length:				49:07

== Charts ==
Chart performance for All Monsters Are Human
Chart (2020)	Peak position
US Billboard 200	51
US Top R&B/Hip-Hop Albums (Billboard)	29
US Independent Albums (Billboard)	3

== See also ==
- List of 2020 albums
