= Fakin' It (K. Michelle song) =

Single by K. Michelle featuring Missy Elliott

from the album What's the 901?
- Released: September 17, 2009
- Recorded: 2009
- Genre: R&B
- Length: 3:50
- Label: Jive; Hitz Committee LLC
- Songwriters: Kimberly Michelle; Elvis Williams; Eric "Cire" Crawford; Melissa Elliot; Esther Dean
- Producer: Blac Elvis

K. Michelle singles chronology
"Self Made" (2009)	"Fakin' It" (2009)	"Fallin'" (2010)

Missy Elliott singles chronology
"Work" (2009)	"Fakin' It" (2009)	"Get Involved" (2010)

"Fakin' It" is a song by American R&B singer K. Michelle, featuring guest vocals by Grammy Award–winning rapper Missy Elliott. It was co-written by Michelle, Elliott and Ester Dean. The song attained slight media attention for Michelle and was intended to serve as the buzz single for her debut studio album, originally titled Pain Medicine.

== Background and meaning ==
In an October 2009 interview, K. Michelle described "Fakin' It" as a fun record that is a "part that women go through," and went on to add that the remaining tracks of her debut weren't like that. Michelle also felt that the record went into detail about sexual issues in regard to relationships and stressed the need to bring it to light in the record.

In response to the male public discrediting the song for its "male-bashing" lyrics, Michelle stated that she wanted the song to be empowering for women as a whole and added that there may be women in relationships who might have a man who "lacks bedroom skills" or "common sense." She also implied that "Fakin' It" was a response to Young Money's "Every Girl," describing: "[Young Money] wanted to say, 'I wish I could fuck every girl in the world;' my thing was to say, 'Okay, well while you're doing it, we're faking [the orgasm].'"

== Release and reception ==
The song first leaked to online urban blogs on August 15, 2009 and initially saw an official digital release on iTunes in September 17, 2009. The song was also featured on World Star Hip Hop in September 15, 2009 for its racy and "damaging male self-esteem" theme. During its radio airplay, an instrumental version of the song was featured on two Promo Only: Urban Club compilations in November and December 2009.

The song met generally favorable reviews. Burmy of DJ Booth gave the song 3.8 out of 5 stars and praised the track for its completion "with a piano-loop beat by Blac Elvis," and its "catchy, creative" elements. He also believed the "cut is sure to be a hit—and a conversation-starter," for its synopsis and "female issues that don’t generally show up in R&B songs." Jermy Leeuwis of Music Remedy gave the song 4.5 out of 5 stars and cited the track as a "classic" and informed listeners to not "sleep on this joint."

== Music video ==
A promotional music video for the single was released via YouTube in September 30, 2009. The video primarily takes place in a studio and focuses on K. Michelle going through the recording process for "Fakin' It. At the end it contains an interlude to her song “Fallin”"

== Track listings and formats ==
CD single

1. "Fakin' It" (Clean Version) — 3:51
2. "Fakin' It" (Main Version) — 3:50
3. "Fakin' It" (Instrumental) — 3:51

iTunes download

1. "Fakin' It" (feat. Missy Elliott) — 3:50

== Chart performance ==
Because of its promo urban-only release, the song only managed to debut and peak at #100 on Billboard Hot R&B/Hip-Hop Songs in its two-week charting performance.

Chart (2009)	Peak position
US Hot R&B/Hip-Hop Songs (Billboard)	100
