= Scooch (song) =

Single by K. Michelle

from the album I'm the Problem
- Released: February 11, 2022
- Genre: R&B; funk
- Length: 3:33
- Label: Chase Landin; MNRK
- Lyricists: Kimberly Pate; Aaron G. Mayfield; Daniel Bryant; Rafael Ishman; Filip Lynah, Jr.; Jeremiah Bethea; Ronnie Jackson
- Producer: Lil' Ronnie

K. Michelle singles chronology
"Party's Over" (2020)	"Scooch" (2022)	"You" (2023)

Music video
- "Scooch" on YouTube

"Scooch" is a song by American singer K. Michelle. Michelle, Aaron G. Mayfield, Daniel Bryant, Dewayne Ishman, Filip Lynah, Jr., Jeremiah Bethea, and Lil' Ronnie wrote it, and the latter handled the production. The song was released on February 11, 2022, as the lead single from her sixth studio album, I'm the Problem (2023). It's an R&B and funk song.

Commercially, the song reached number one on the Adult R&B Airplay chart and number 18 on the R&B/Hip-Hop Airplay chart in the United States. Derek Blanks directed its music video, which was released on March 25, 2022.

== Composition ==
"Scooch" is a mid-tempo R&B song featuring synthesizers, keyboards, drums and finger snaps. An alternate version of the song, titled "K's Smooth Mix", has a slower tempo. The lyrics depict a woman who is attracted to someone other than her current partner and having intentions to visit him late at night.

== Reception ==
Writing for HotNewHipHop, Alexander Cole characterized "Scooch" as a "smooth R&B slow jam" and described K. Michelle's vocals as smooth. Butta from Soul Bounce praised the track, describing it as a "good look and great sound" for Michelle. Andy Kellman of AllMusic described the song as bubbling with "retrofitted sophisti-funk". Mya Abraham of Vibe wrote that the track evoked love songs from the 1970s and 1980s, comparing its sound to the musical works of other then-recent artists Silk Sonic and Shelley FKA DRAM.

Commercially, "Scooch" reached number one on the US Billboard Adult R&B Songs chart. This marked Michelle's first number-one song on that chart. Michelle wrote to Billboard via email about the achievement, saying: "As an artist, there's nothing better than reaching No. 1. I'm over-the-moon grateful [...] I've worked very hard in my career, and I've tried to make music for the hearts and not the charts, but being acknowledged by radio and my fans in this way is something I'll always be proud of". The song peaked at number 18 on the US R&B/Hip-Hop Airplay chart.

== Music video and promotion ==
On February 11, 2022, Michelle performed "Scooch" on The Real to accompany its release. The official music video for the song, which was directed by Derek Blanks, was released on March 25, 2022.

== Credits and personnel ==
Credits are adapted from Tidal.

- Producer – Lil' Ronnie
- Lyricists – Kimberly Pate, Aaron G. Mayfield, Daniel Bryant, Rafael Dewayne Ishman, Filip Lynah, Jr., Jeremiah "Sickpen" Bethea, Ronnie Jackson
- Engineer – Philip Lynah (Prince)
- Mixer – Jaycen Joshua

== Charts ==
=== Weekly charts ===
Weekly chart performance for "Scooch"
Chart (2022)	Peak position
US Adult R&B Songs (Billboard)	1
US R&B/Hip-Hop Airplay (Billboard)	18

=== Year-end charts ===
Year-end chart performance for "Scooch"
Chart (2022)	Position
US Adult R&B Songs (Billboard)	15
