= The Rain (K. Michelle song) =

2019 song by K. Michelle

Single by K. Michelle

from the album All Monsters Are Human
- Released: October 25, 2019
- Genre: R&B; soul
- Length: 3:30
- Label: eOne Music
- Songwriters: Kimberly Pate, Phalon Alexander, James Harris III, Rafael Ishman, Cory Moore, Terry Lewis
- Producer: Jazze Pha

K.Michelle singles chronology
"Supahood" (2019)	"The Rain" (2019)	"Party's Over" (2020)

"The Rain" is a song by American R&B singer K. Michelle. It was released on October 25, 2019 via eOne Music as the second single from her fifth studio album All Monsters Are Human. Production of the song was handled by Jazze Pha, while the song was penned by Michelle, Pha, Rafael Ishman, Cory Moore, Jimmy Jam and Terry Lewis.

== Background ==
Michelle shared the song to her fans via her Instagram live in April 2019. The track was produced by Jazze Pha and samples the 1988 hit "Can You Stand the Rain" by R&B group New Edition.

== Critical reception ==
Erika Marie of the website HotNewHipHop stated, "When K. Michelle first announced "The Rain," fans thought that she would be paying homage to R&B group SWV's 1998 classic "Rain." However, K. and Jazze Pha instead tapped New Edition iconic 1988 chart-topper "Can You Stand The Rain" for the singer's sexy track. "The Rain" isn't about the weather, either; We'll just leave it up to you to listen to the song and figure out what wetness K. Michelle is talking about." Brittany Burton of Respect commented on Michelle's concept, stating: "Her desire to push the lines between sexuality and sensuality stand out vividly on this single. But most importantly, K. Michelle reminds fans that real R&B is here and thriving like never before. Her passion for her craft and creating a work of perfection, is why she has found so much longevity in the music business."

== Music video ==
The music video for "The Rain" was directed by Zachary Greaton and premiered simultaneously with the release of the song on October 25, 2019.

== Live performances ==
K. Michelle debuted the song with its first live performance on the Soul Train Music Awards on November 17, 2019. During this performance, the singer wore an all-white dress, and was accompanied by four male backup dancers in white tuxedos. According to BET's Alexis Reese, Michelle delivered "sultry" vocals in front of the simplistic white stage set. On January 30, 2020, Michelle performed the song on The Wendy Williams Show.

== Chart performance ==
Chart (2019–2020)	Peak position
US Digital Song Sales (Billboard)	28
US R&B/Hip-Hop Airplay (Billboard)	25
US Adult R&B Songs (Billboard)	8

== Certifications ==
Region	Certification	Certified units/sales
United States (RIAA)	Gold	500,000^{‡}
^{‡} Sales+streaming figures based on certification alone.
