= I'm the Problem (K. Michelle album) =

2023 studio album by K. Michelle

Studio album by K. Michelle
- Released: September 22, 2023
- Genre: R&B
- Length: 59:56
- Labels: Chase Landin; MNRK

K. Michelle chronology
All Monsters Are Human (2020)	I'm the Problem (2023)	Jesus & Whiskey (2026)

Singles from I'm the Problem
- 1. "Scooch" Released: February 11, 2022; 2. "You" Released: March 17, 2023; 3. "Wherever the D May Land" Released: April 14, 2023; 4. "Blame Yourself" Released: September 1, 2023

I'm the Problem is the sixth studio album by American singer and songwriter K. Michelle, released on September 22, 2023, by Chase Landin and MNRK Music Group. The album was reportedly her final R&B album before a transition toward country music.

== Promotion ==
The album's lead single "Scooch" reached number one on the Billboard Adult R&B Songs chart, becoming K. Michelle’s first number-one on the chart.. Following its release, K. Michelle performed "Scooch" on The Real. It was followed by the singles "You", "Wherever the D May Land" (featuring Gloss Up), and "Blame Yourself", alongside the promotional single "Tennessee".

Promotional music videos were also released for "Hurt Shit," "Same Damn Show," and "This Man."

On December 14, 2022, K. Michelle announced the I’m the Problem Tour and its dates.

== Critical reception ==
Professional ratings
Review scores
Source	Rating
AllMusic	3/5 stars

Andy Kellman of AllMusic gave the album a 3 out of 5-star rating. He noted that the album reflects K. Michelle’s stated intention to transition away from R&B toward country music, describing it as “the emptying of a clip” that emphasizes emotional and stylistic variety. Kellman highlighted tracks such as “Scooch,” which he described as “sophisti-funk”-influenced, “You,” which evokes late-1990s R&B production styles, and “Blame Yourself,” which incorporates trap influences. He also observed that much of the album consists of emotionally charged ballads centered on themes of anguish, resilience, and confrontation, concluding that the project feels like an “unvarnished outpouring” of emotion.

Flisadam Pointer of ThisisRnB described I'm the Problem as a “bittersweet goodbye” to R&B, noting it as K. Michelle’s final album in the genre before her transition to country music. Pointer wrote that the album reflects the various aspects of the artist’s identity, including K. Michelle, Kimberly Pate, and her country alter ego Puddin, and characterized it as her most intentional project to date. She praised the album’s vocal performances, songwriting, and musicianship, highlighting its mix of ballads, commercially oriented tracks such as “Scooch,” and collaborations including “Wherever the D May Land” featuring Gloss Up. Pointer also discussed the album’s thematic focus on personal reflection and industry challenges, though she noted that its sequencing and cohesion were inconsistent.

Mya Abraham of Vibe described I’m the Problem as a project reflecting K. Michelle’s personal growth and self-reflection, highlighting themes of accountability, emotional honesty, and life transitions throughout the album.[She noted that the album chronicles the singer’s experiences with relationships and personal healing, and emphasized its role in marking a shift in her artistic and personal direction.

Antwane Folk of Rated R&B highlighted “God Knew,” “No Pain,” “This Man,” “You,” and “Gangsta In Me” as standout tracks, and noted that the album explores themes of heartbreak, emotional resilience, and empowerment.

== Track listing ==
I'm the Problem track listing
No.	Title	Writer(s)	Producer(s)	Length
1.	"Intro: Lot of Nothing, Pt. 1"	Corey Ling; Demetrius K. Sims; Kimberly M. Pate; Sheldon Ferguson	Ling; Ferguson; Herothaproducer	1:16
2.	"Memphis"	Charlie Clark Jr.; Pate	SeQuence Clark	2:57
3.	"No Pain"	Cory Moore; Keyiara Sallie; Pate; Phalon Alexander; Tony Matthews	Cory Mo; Jazze Pha	3:30
4.	"Blame Yourself"	Filip Lynah, Jr.; Jeremiah "Sickpen" Bethea; Pate; Rafael Dewayne Ishman; Ronnie Jackson	Lil Ronnie	4:09
5.	"Love Language"	Charles Hinshaw Jr.; Kenneth Paryo; Pate	KP	2:55
6.	"You"	Demetrius K. Sims; Jonathan L. Jackson; Keyiara Sallie; Pate; Milton Adams II; Tony	Herothaproducer; Double J; Troy Oliver	4:00
7.	"Lot of Nothing, Pt. 2"	Ling; Sims; Pate; Ferguson	Ling; Ferguson; Herothaproducer	0:44
8.	"Big Deal"	Aaron Lockhart; Pate; Michael Laury	Dubba-AA; Mike Laury	2:35
9.	"Wherever the D May Land" (featuring Gloss Up)	Payro; Pate; Peter Whitley Eddins; Roy Keisha Rockette; Stephen Kirk; Matthews	Eddins; KP	3:33
10.	"Hurt Shit"	Lockhart; Pate; Laury; Matthews	Dubba-AA; Mike Laury	3:15
11.	"I Cheat"	Aaron G. Mayfield; Bethea; Pate; Lynah Jr.; Ishman; Jackson; Rockette	Lil Ronnie	4:57
12.	"Only One"	Gauntelette Alexander Jr.; Sallie; Pate; Adams II; Matthews	Versace P	3:49
13.	"Gangsta in Me"	Jeremy Eudovique; Pate; Matthews	Vique	3:21
14.	"Lot of Nothing, Pt. 3"	Ling; Sims; Pate; Ferguson	Ling; Ferguson; Herothaproducer	1:21
15.	"This Man"	Bethea; Joshua Cassius Jay Cross; Sallie; Pate; Sean Pen McMillon; Matthews	Cassius J	3:48
16.	"Scooch"	Mayfield; Daniel Bryant; Bethea; Pate; Lynah Jr.; Ishman; Jackson	Lil Ronnie	3:33
17.	"God Knew"	Christopher Gholson; Pate; Patrick Hayes	Drumma Boy	3:44
18.	"Same Damn Show"	Stephen Kirk; Aaron Pearce; Pate; Rockette	Aaron Pierce	3:12

Bonus track
No.	Title	Writer(s)	Producer(s)	Length
19.	"Tennessee"	Charles Harmon p/k/a Louis York; Claude Kelly; Pate	Claude Kelly; Charles Harmon p/k/a Louis York	3:17
Total length:				59:56

== Charts ==
Chart (2023)	Peak position
US Independent Albums (Billboard)	21
US Top Album Sales (Billboard)	69

== Release history ==
Release dates and format(s) for I'm the Problem
Region	Date	Format(s)	Label	Ref.
Various	September 22, 2023	CD; digital download; LP	Chase Landin; MNRK	
