= Dozzi =

Australian sibling musical trio

- Genre: Country
- Occupation: Singers-songwriters
- Years active: 2013–present
- Website: https://dozzimusic.net//

Dozzi is an Australian trio of singers and songwriters, founded by sisters, Andrea, Jesse, and Nina Dozzi. Vocalist duties are shared by each of the sisters. Andrea plays mandolin, Jesse guitar, and Nina on keys.

== Early life ==
Andrea, Jesse, and Nina Dozzi grew up in a musical home in Brisbane, Australia. Their parents, Mark and Sharon Dozzi, met while playing music and formed the band Small Torque in the 1980s. Both parents were full time musicians. The girls sang along with Sharon and helped her learn cover songs by recording the music and writing down the lyrics. Mark is a guitarist, multi-instrumentalist, and songwriter. They wrote songs during the day and performed at night. The girls, along with three other siblings, Caleb, Jordan, and Georgia, spent much of their childhood backstage. The girls all play guitar and keys because the instruments were available to them at home.

The Dozzi sisters moved to Nashville, Tennessee in 2016 to pursue their music careers.

== Music career ==
In 2013, Dozzi won the Australian Country Music People's Choice Award for Best Video Clip for "Love Away The Bad Days".

In 2014, Dozzi released the single "I Need You Tonight", a duet with Drew McAlister, as a teaser to their debut album Risk It All. I Need You Tonight won the trio's second People's Choice Award in 2015 for Best Video Clip and topped the Australian Country Music Charts at number one. Their next single, Weakness, saw chart success as well.

In 2019, they released an EP, Worth The Wait, produced by Eric Torres. The EP contains Dozzi's first Nashville-produced singles: "Fools", "Ramones T-Shirt", and the title track, "Worth The Wait". "Fools", received critical acclaim from Rolling Stone, who named the song one of the "10 Best Country and Americana Songs to Hear Now". Ramones T-Shirt was placed in rotation on Australian radio and CMC. The video for Worth The Wait premiered on CMT.

The video for Dozzi's 2021 single, "Messy" has been placed in rotation on CMT. The video is Dozzi's first underwater music video, filmed by CreateWell LLC.
