= Love 'Em All =

Single by K. Michelle

from the album Anybody Wanna Buy a Heart?
- Released: September 16, 2014
- Genre: Pop rock; R&B
- Length: 4:06
- Label: Atlantic
- Composers: B.A.M.; Lil' Ronnie; Shea Taylor
- Lyricists: Kimberly Pate; Bianca Atterberry
- Producer: Shea Taylor

K. Michelle singles chronology
"Can't Raise a Man" (2013)	"Love 'Em All" (2014)	"Maybe I Should Call" (2014)

"Love 'Em All" is a song recorded by American singer K. Michelle from the second studio album Anybody Wanna Buy a Heart? (2014). It was released as the lead single from the record on September 16, 2014, through Atlantic. "Love 'Em All" was written by Michelle and Bianca Atterberry and composed by B.A.M., Lil' Ronnie and Shea Taylor. Taylor co-produced the single with Lil' Ronnie and B.A.M. A pop rock and R&B ballad, its lyrics are about sexuality and a woman pursuing multiple relationships. Michelle said that "Love 'Em All" is a response to Chris Brown's 2013 single "Loyal".

Critics responded positively to "Love 'Em All", and it peaked at numbers 26 and 35 on the R&B/Hip-Hop Airplay and Hot R&B/Hip-Hop Songs Billboard charts, respectively. An accompanying video, released on November 3, 2014, features Michelle dancing with a chair and singing on a throne. Michelle also promoted "Love 'Em All" through live performances. Atlantic also released remixes of the single, including one featuring American rapper Jeezy.

== Recording and release ==
"Love 'Em All" was written by Kimberly Michelle Pate, (Note: K. Michelle is credited under her full legal name Kimberly Michelle Pate on the album's liner notes.) and Bianca Atterberry. It was composed by B.A.M., Lil' Ronnie and Shea Taylor. Taylor co-produced the single with Lil' Ronnie and B.A.M. and played the instruments. Atterberry produced the song's vocals, which were recorded by C Travis Kr8ts. Atlantic released "Love 'Em All" on September 16, 2014 as the lead single from Michelle's second studio album Anybody Wanna Buy a Heart? (2014). Describing her debut album Rebellious Soul (2013) as "a glorified mixtape" due to her "angry and aggressive" approach, Michelle said that she recorded "Love 'Em All" to pursue a "new vibe" and act "innovative and progressive". Prior to its release, she posted a preview on her Instagram account. Michelle also hosted a webcast on Google Chat to introduce the track to her followers and promote its release beforehand.

A remix with an additional verse from Jeezy was released on SoundCloud. Kevin Goddard of HotNewHipHop described the remix as "adding some hip-hop flavor to the grungy love ballad", and wrote that Jeezy rapped with "braggadocious rhymes and slick analogies for the streets". The remix was not included on the album. On March 10, 2015, additional remixes by Redondo and Toyboy & Robin was made available on Apple Music.

== Composition and lyrics ==
"Love 'Em All" (2014)
A 22-second sample of "Love 'Em All", a song professing K. Michelle is not emotionally invested in many relationships with men.

"Love 'Em All" is a pop rock and R&B ballad that lasts four minutes and five seconds. The instrumental includes "pounding drums", and Emily Tan of The Boombox interpreted the composition as containing a "driving beat". BuzzFeed's Alex Naidus identified Michelle's vocals as "brassy [and] wailing". With lyrics revolving around sexuality and a woman "playing the field", "Love 'Em All" is a response to Chris Brown's 2013 single "Loyal". Michelle said that the single was based on the line "these bitches ain't loyal", and explained that she wanted to make "a record that basically said what most women do but they won’t say".

Music critics described "Love 'Em All" as a "heartbreaker anthem". The song opens with Michelle narrating: "They say I move too fast / Going man to man / Always holding a new hand.” She sings about her relationships in the chorus: 'Cause they think I love 'em / But I love 'em all / I need another one to get over the other one.” Other lyrics include: “I broke another heart today / And I didn’t care, I just walked away / ‘Cause they think I love ’em, but I love ’em all.”

== Reception ==
"Love 'Em All" received primarily positive reviews from music critics. Mike Wass of Idolator praised it as a "killer lead single", and AllMusic's Andy Kellman selected it as one of the album's highlights. Kevin Apaza of Direct Lyrics felt that it would be successful on rhythmic radio, and commended it as "an anthem for many women". Vibe's Michael Arceneaux praised the single, along with the album track "Judge Me" as "the best introduction to the K. Michelle of 2014". Alex Naidus and DJ JusMusic of Singersroom included "Love 'Em All" on their lists of the best R&B releases of 2014. In a more negative review, PopMatters' Devone Jones criticized the song as "good enough despite the boring lyrics". While he felt its opening set up an expectation for "a beautiful rock ballad", Jones wrote that it "just becomes another typical R&B song that isn’t a car crash". Commercially, "Love 'Em All" peaked at 26 and 35 on the R&B/Hip-Hop Airplay and Hot R&B/Hip-Hop Songs Billboard charts, respectively.

== Music video and promotion ==
On November 3, 2014, the single's accompanying music video debuted on VH1. It was shown after the debut of Michelle's reality television K. Michelle: My Life. It was uploaded on the singer's YouTube account on the same day. Dressed in a sparkling leotard, Michelle dances with a chair; she appears alongside a group of back-up dancers in a room full of black mannequins. The singer is also seen singing while sitting on a throne. A writer for Rap-Up praised it as "her fiercest video yet". Comparing Michelle's choreography to that in Britney Spears' music video for her 2000 single "Stronger", Kevin Apaza responded positively to the visual's "sexy treatment". As February 2, 2015, the video received over 7 million views on YouTube.

Michelle also promoted "Love 'Em All" through live performances. On December 12, 2014, she performed it on Big Morning Buzz Live. Rahsheeda Ali responded positively to Michelle's performance, writing that she "sounded amazing". She sang "Love 'Em All" as part of her 2015 My Twisted Mind Tour. The song was also included on the setlist for her 2016 Hello Kimberly Tour. Joey Guerra of the Houston Chronicle praised her performance as "an early highlight" of the show, and described it as "a stunning display of poise and power".

== Track listings ==
Digital download
No.	Title	Length
1.	"Love 'Em All"	4:06
2.	"Love 'Em All (feat. Jeezy) (Remix)"	4:19
3.	"Love 'Em All (Instrumental)"	4:05

Digital download
No.	Title	Length
1.	"Love 'Em All (Redondo Remix)"	5:30
2.	"Love 'Em All (Toyboy & Robin Remix)"	3:52

== Credits and personnel ==
Credits were adapted from the liner notes from Anybody Wanna Buy A Heart?:

- Kimberly Pate – lyricist
- Bianca Atterberry – lyricist, vocal production
- Shea Taylor –production, music, instrumentation
- B.A.M. – co-production, music
- Ronnie "Lil Ronnie" Jackson – co-production, music
- C Travis Kr8ts – recording
- Jaycen Joshua – mixing
- Maddox Chhim – mixing assistantance
- Ryan Kaul – mixing assistantance
- David Kutch – mastering

== Charts ==
Chart (2015)	Peak position
US Bubbling Under Hot 100 (Billboard)	15
US Hot R&B/Hip-Hop Songs (Billboard)	35
US R&B/Hip-Hop Airplay (Billboard)	26

== Certifications ==
Region	Certification	Certified units/sales
United States (RIAA)	Platinum	1,000,000^{‡}
^{‡} Sales+streaming figures based on certification alone.

== Release history ==
Region	Format	Date	Label
United States	Digital download	September 16, 2014	Atlantic
United States	Remix package	March 10, 2015	Atlantic
