= Maybe I Should Call =

Single by K. Michelle

from the album Anybody Wanna Buy a Heart?
- Released: November 4, 2014
- Recorded: 2014
- Genre: R&B, soul
- Length: 3:28
- Label: Atlantic Records
- Songwriters: Kimberly Michelle Pate, Eric Hudson, Andrew "Hitdrew" Clifton, Bianca Atterberry, Guordan Banks
- Producer: Eric Hudson

K. Michelle singles chronology
"Love 'Em All" (2014)	"Maybe I Should Call" (2014)	"Hard to Do" (2014)

"Maybe I Should Call" is a song by American R&B singer K. Michelle released on November 4, 2014. It was the second single from the singer's second album, Anybody Wanna Buy a Heart?.

== Background ==
The song's lyrics talk about Michelle's past relationship with actor Idris Elba. The Couple had met at the 2013 Soul Train Awards and had an 8-month long relationship. Lyrically, the song specifically talks about the couples breakup and how she wishes she was the one with him, even though he already has a family.

== Critical reception ==
On the week of November 7, Billboard named "Maybe I Should Call" one of the best singles of the week, giving the song three and half out of four stars. Steven J. Horowitz of Billboard stated that the song is "bristly and raw" and praised her "tender lyrics about a lover's absence".

== Music video ==
The lyric video for "Maybe I Should Call" was released on her official YouTube account on November 10, 2014. The music video was released on November 17, 2014, on her official YouTube account.

== Certifications ==
Region	Certification	Certified units/sales
United States (RIAA)	Gold	500,000^{‡}
^{‡} Sales+streaming figures based on certification alone.
