= K. Michelle =

American singer (born 1982)

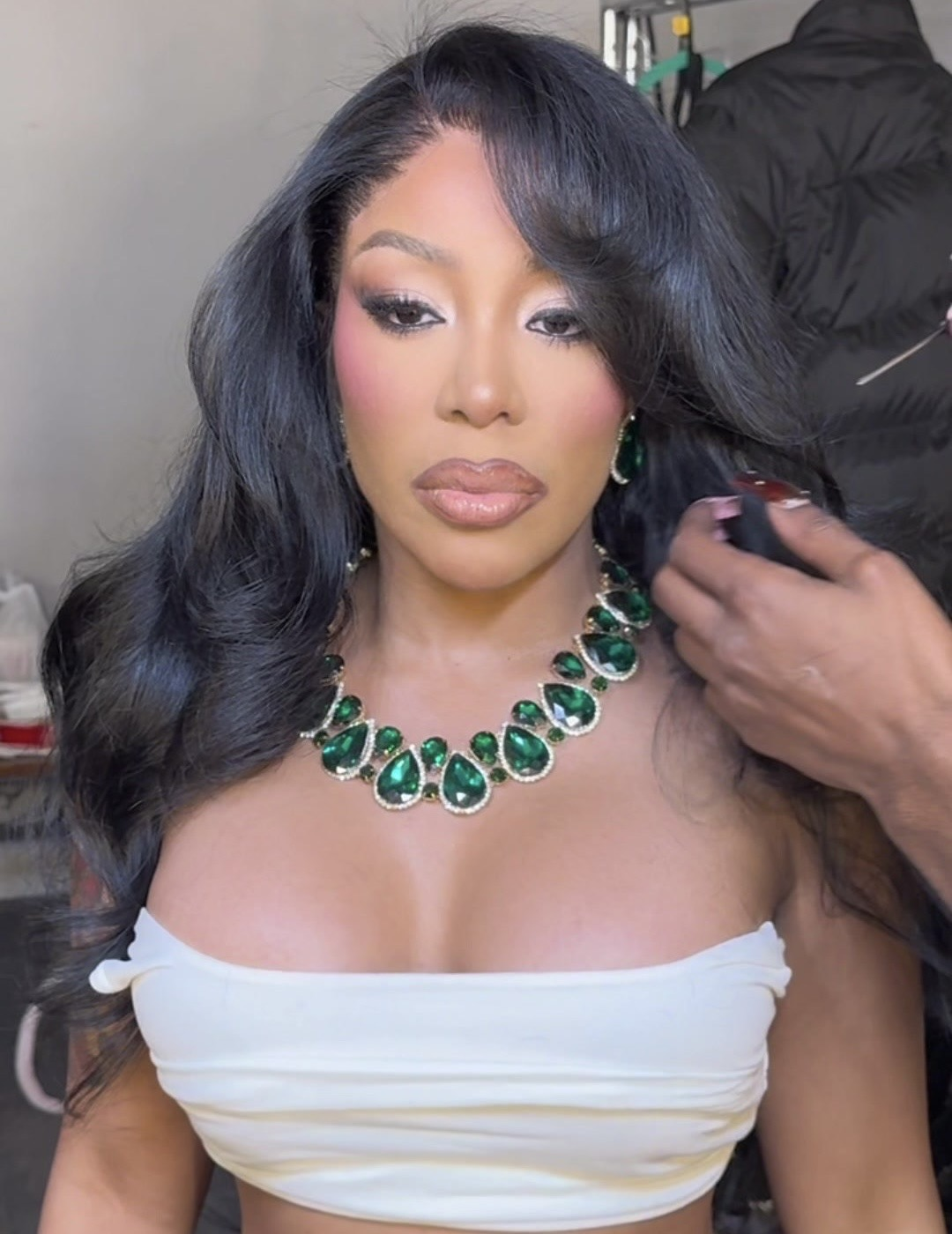
- K. Michelle in 2026
- Born: Kimberly Michelle Pate; March 4, 1982 (age 44); Memphis, Tennessee, U.S.
- Education: Florida A&M University (BL)
- Occupations: Singer; songwriter; television personality; actress
- Years active: 2009–present
- Spouse: Kastan Sims (m. 2025)
- Children: 1
- Musical career
- Genres: R&B; country
- Labels: BBR; MNRK; Atlantic; Jive; RCA
- Website: kmichelleofficial.com

Signature
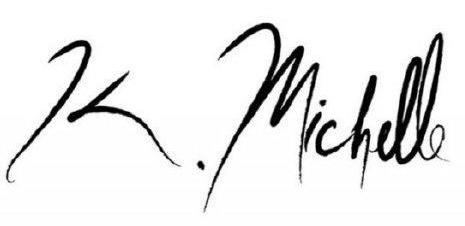

Kimberly Michelle Pate (born March 4, 1982), known professionally as K. Michelle, is an American singer, songwriter, and television personality. She began her recording career in 2009 after signing with Jive Records, releasing multiple singles and mixtapes before parting ways with the label following its dissolution in 2011. She rose to prominence in 2012 as a cast member of VH1's reality series Love & Hip Hop: Atlanta, subsequently releasing her debut studio album, Rebellious Soul (2013) through Atlantic Records. The album peaked at number two on the US Billboard 200 and topped the Billboard Top R&B/Hip-Hop Albums chart. Her subsequent albums, Anybody Wanna Buy a Heart? (2014) and More Issues Than Vogue (2016), also reached the top ten of the Billboard 200. Her 2022 single "Scooch" became her first number-one entry on the Billboard Adult R&B Songs chart. After releasing six R&B studio albums, Michelle pursued a career in country music, signing with BBR Music Group and BMG Nashville in 2024. She released her debut country album, Jesus & Whiskey, in October 2026.

In addition to her recording career, Michelle became a prominent reality television personality through appearances across the Love & Hip Hop franchise, including Love & Hip Hop: New York and Love & Hip Hop: Hollywood. From 2014 to 2017, she starred in her own VH1 reality series, K. Michelle: My Life, which ran for three seasons. She also executive-produced the Lifetime docuseries My Killer Body with K. Michelle (2022), which explored the consequences of dangerous cosmetic procedures, drawing in part on her own experiences with complications from illegal silicone injections. In 2026, she joined the main cast of the seventeenth season of Bravo's The Real Housewives of Atlanta. Outside her entertainment career, she has partnered with Jack Daniel's and operated the Atlanta restaurant Puff & Petals.

== Early life ==
Kimberly Michelle Pate was born on March 4, 1982, in Memphis, Tennessee. She began developing an interest in music at an early age, learning to play piano and guitar and taking vocal lessons from Bob Westbrook, a vocal coach known for working with artists including Justin Timberlake and Britney Spears. She attended Overton High School in Memphis, graduating in 2000.

Following high school, Michelle received a music scholarship to Florida A&M University (FAMU), which she obtained by yodeling during her audition. Michelle studied music, became involved in campus life and was crowned the Freshman Attendant of the Homecoming Court. She later joined the Delta Sigma Theta sorority, pledging the Beta Alpha chapter in 2001. During her time at FAMU, she temporarily paused her studies after the birth of her son in 2004 before returning to complete her degree. She graduated with honors and was offered acceptance to multiple law schools, though she ultimately declined to pursue a legal career in favor of focusing on music full-time.

== Career ==
=== 2009–2011: Beginnings ===
In 2009, she signed a recording contract with Jive Records and released her debut single, "Fakin' It", featuring Missy Elliott. The single charted on the U.S. Hot R&B/Hip-Hop Songs chart, peaking at number 100. Throughout 2010, she released several follow-up singles, including "Fallin'", "I Just Can't Do This" and "How Many Times", which also charted on the U.S. Hot R&B/Hip-Hop Songs chart.

During this period, she worked on her planned debut studio album, originally titled Pain Medicine. The project was reported to include collaborations with artists such as Trina, Gucci Mane, Akon, Usher, and R. Kelly, whom she has described as a mentor during the early stages of her career. However, the album was ultimately shelved following the closure of Jive Records in 2011, and she was released from the label.

=== 2012–2015: Love & Hip Hop, Rebellious Soul and Anybody Wanna Buy a Heart? ===
In 2012, she joined the cast of VH1's reality series Love & Hip Hop: Atlanta. The first season documented her return to the music industry following personal and professional setbacks, including a previously reported abusive relationship with a music executive. She became one of the breakout figures of the series and subsequently signed a multi-album recording contract with Atlantic Records. She returned for the show's second season, which chronicled the recording of her debut studio album, Rebellious Soul.

On May 20, 2013, she released "V.S.O.P" as the lead single from her debut album Rebellious Soul. The song, produced by Pop & Oak, contains a sample of “Very Special” by Debra Laws, and "That's How Long" performed by The Chi-Lites. It peaked at number 89 on the U.S. Billboard Hot 100 and number 27 on the U.S. Billboard Hot R&B/Hip-Hop Songs chart. Its music video, directed by Benny Boom, was released on June 29, 2013. The single was later certified Gold by the RIAA. The album was released on August 13, 2013, debuting at number two on the U.S. Billboard 200 and number one on the U.S. Top R&B/Hip-Hop Albums chart with first-week sales of 72,000 copies. By late 2014, it had sold over 260,000 copies in the United States, and was later certified Gold.

Following the album’s release, she embarked on her first headlining tour, The Rebellious Soul Tour, presented by BET Music Matters, which ran from November to December 2013. The tour featured supporting acts including Sevyn Streeter and Tiara Thomas. In January 2014, she released "Can't Raise a Man" which peaked at number 94 on the U.S. Billboard Hot 100 and number 23 on the Hot R&B/Hip-Hop Songs chart. The single was later certified Platinum.

After departing Love & Hip Hop: Atlanta, she joined the cast of Love & Hip Hop: New York for its fourth season. During this period, she released the mixtape Still No Fucks Given (2014) and toured as a supporting act on Robin Thicke's Blurred Lines Tour. Her participation in Love & Hip Hop: New York also served as a lead-in to her own reality series, K. Michelle: My Life, which premiered in November 2014.

On September 16, 2014, she released "Love 'Em All" as the lead single from her second studio album Anybody Wanna Buy a Heart?. The album was released on December 9, 2014, through Atlantic Records and debuted at number six on the Billboard 200 chart and number one on the Top R&B/Hip-Hop Albums chart, selling 87,000 copies in its first week. Billboard recognized it as the highest-selling female R&B album of 2014. It produced the singles “Maybe I Should Call” and “Hard to Do,” both of which were later certified Gold by the RIAA. The album also included the single “How Do You Know?” “Love 'Em All” was later certified Platinum by the RIAA, and the album track “Cry” was certified Gold.

=== 2016–2018: More Issues Than Vogue and Kimberly: The People I Used to Know ===
In 2016, she released "Not a Little Bit" as the lead single from her third studio album More Issues Than Vogue, followed by several promotional singles including “Ain’t You,” “Mindful,” and “Time.” The album was made available for pre-order in February 2016 and released on March 25, 2016. It debuted at number two on the U.S. Billboard 200 and number one on the Top R&B Albums chart.

Following her return appearances on Love & Hip Hop: Atlanta, she rejoined the main cast for season five, which documented her relocation to Atlanta and the release of More Issues Than Vogue. Later that year, she embarked on the Hello Kimberly Tour, which ran from July to August 2016. In September 2016, she released “Forward,” a contribution to the soundtrack of the film "The Birth of a Nation".

In 2017, she was featured on “Got Me Crazy” in collaboration with DJ Feezy, Rick Ross, and Fabolous. Her reality series K. Michelle: My Life concluded after three seasons the same year. She later released the singles “Birthday” and “Either Way” featuring Chris Brown, leading into her fourth studio album Kimberly: The People I Used to Know, released on December 7, 2017, which became her fourth album to reach the top ten of the U.S. Top R&B Albums chart. The project also marked her final release under Atlantic Records.

In 2018, she joined the cast of Love & Hip Hop: Hollywood for its fifth season, becoming the first cast member in the franchise to appear as a main cast member across three different installments. During this period, she signed with Entertainment One Music. and released the single "Save Me".

=== 2019–2023: All Monsters Are Human and I'm the Problem ===
She announced her fifth studio album, All Monsters Are Human, in 2019 during her O.S.D. Tour. She also released the mixtape Not 1 Fuck Given on January 1, 2020, as part of her ongoing 0 Fucks Given series. The album was preceded by the single “The Rain,”which became her first top 10 entry on the U.S. Billboard Adult R&B Songs chart and was later certified Gold by the RIAA.

All Monsters Are Human was released on January 31, 2020, debuting at number 51 on the U.S. Billboard 200 and reaching the top five on the Top R&B Albums chart, marking her fifth consecutive top 10 entry on that chart. The album received generally positive reviews and was further supported by the single “Just Like Jay,” which also received a music video.

In 2022, she announced her sixth album, I'm the Problem, as her final R&B project. Its lead single, "Scooch", was released on February 11, 2022, and became her first number-one single on the Billboard Adult R&B Songs chart. The album was released on September 22, 2023, through MNRK and debuted at number 21 on the U.S. Independent Albums chart.

Michelle has long expressed interest in recording a country music album, began previewing material for a crossover project following the release of I'm the Problem.

In April 2023, she made her Nashville performance debut at the kickoff of BMI's Rooftop on the Row concert series. That same year, she released the country song "Tennessee" as a promotional single and bonus track on her I'm The Problem album, introducing the material under her alter ego 'Puddin'. She co-wrote the song with its producers, Claude Kelly and Chuck Harmony of Louis York. She also performed at CMA Fest earlier that year. She also appeared on "Country Love Song" with Justin Champagne and contributed to The Judds tribute album, A Tribute to the Judds, performing a cover of "Love Can Build a Bridge" alongside Jelly Roll and Fisk Jubilee Singers.

In November 2023, she and Jelly Roll performed “Love Can Build a Bridge” live at the 57th Annual Country Music Association Awards where their performance received a standing ovation.

=== 2024–present: Move to country music and The Real Housewives of Atlanta ===
In July 2024, she signed a recording contract with BBR Music Group and BMG Nashville to release her debut country project. Michelle performed at the CMA Fest in 2024, where she appeared on the VIP stage at Nissan Stadium. In June 2025, she performed "The Star-Spangled Banner" at CMA Fest. In August 2025, she released "Jack Daniel’s" as her first promotional country single under BBR Music Group and BMG Nashville. The song peaked at number 18 on the iTunes Country Songs chart. It was produced by Kristian Bush and Jeff Balding, and written by Balding, Ernest, Jordan Dozzi, Rocky Block, and K. Michelle. Following its release, BBR Music Group described the track as an "absolutely stunning country debut" for K.Michelle.

In 2026, she joined the main cast of the Bravo reality television series The Real Housewives of Atlanta for its seventeenth season. On July 30, 2026, she announced her debut country album, Jesus & Whiskey, which was released on October 16, 2026, through Real Outlawz Records, under exclusive license to BBR Music Group. The album's title track, "Jesus & Whiskey", was released the same day. She performed the song on Live! with Kelly and Mark later that day.

== Artistry ==
Michelle has described her music as "to the point, no chaser, straight R&B." Alex Macpherson of The Guardian characterized her music as "real talk and uncompromising emotional honesty" and, reviewing her debut album Rebellious Soul (2013), described her songwriting as "a disquieting blend of the conversational and confessional." Joey Guerra of the Houston Chronicle described the album as a "savvy mix of old-school soul and modern R&B," noting that it showcased her vocal range. Reviewing More Issues Than Vogue (2016), Ben Beaumont-Thomas of The Guardian identified elements of dance-pop, Southern hip hop and country soul in her music, alongside its R&B balladry. Her music frequently draws on personal experiences, exploring relationships, heartbreak and sexuality; Gerrick D. Kennedy of the Los Angeles Times characterized her songs as "cathartic and painstakingly unfiltered." Michelle has cited R. Kelly, Whitney Houston and Mary J. Blige as major musical influences, as well as Kanye West as her favorite rapper. She has also identified Nina Simone as an inspiration for her strength, praised Blige's ability to "make you feel anything she sings," and admired Houston's voice. Country music has also been a longstanding influence; she grew up listening to The Judds and has attributed the storytelling in her songwriting to the genre, explaining that "a lot of my writing and storytelling is because of country music." Her debut country album, Jesus & Whiskey (2026), further explored this influence, incorporating R&B elements into the country sound, including on the track "Anything."

== Other ventures ==
In 2015, Michelle partnered with Jack Daniel's Tennessee Honey, becoming the brand's first Black ambassador. The partnership began during her My Twisted Mind Tour, featuring signature cocktails at concert venues and promotional opportunities for fans, including VIP experiences and an appearance on the red carpet at the BET Awards. In 2017, the collaboration expanded to Jack Daniel's Country Cocktails, with Michelle helping develop the Southern Peach flavor and design its custom gold crown cap. In 2023, she said the partnership had earned her more money than her music career, telling The Shade Room, "I made more money and learned more business from Jack Daniel's than I made with any music."

In May 2017, Michelle opened Puff & Petals, a restaurant and lounge on Edgewood Avenue in Atlanta, Georgia. Describing its concept, she said she wanted it to be "a place where women can feel safe and comfortable and have great drinks." In January 2020, she partnered with Atlanta restaurateur Shema Fulton, owner of Pearl Restaurant and Lounge, to launch Puff Meets Pearl, a weekly pop-up dining experience at Garden Parc that combined menu selections from both establishments. Puff & Petals closed in February 2020, with its former location subsequently replaced by another restaurant.

== Public image and personal life ==
=== Controversies ===
Michelle's appearance on the first season of Love & Hip Hop: Atlanta in 2012 attracted attention for her allegations of physical abuse and financial exploitation by former boyfriend and Jive Records' executive Mickey "Memphitz" Wright Jr., whom she accused of assaulting her and misappropriating money from her recording budget. Although she did not identify Wright by name on the program, he was subsequently identified in media reports and denied the allegations. In September 2012, Wright filed a defamation lawsuit against VH1 and the show's production companies, seeking $15 million in compensatory damages and $50 million in punitive damages; Michelle was subsequently added as a defendant. On April 9, 2015, a Fulton County judge granted summary judgment in favor of the defendants, finding that Wright was a public figure, that the production companies had exercised due diligence in investigating Michelle's claims, and that the allegations of physical abuse and financial misconduct were substantially true. During depositions, Wright acknowledged having a physical altercation with Michelle at a Memphis hotel in 2009 and using record-label funds, including money from her recording budget, to purchase jewelry. The court separately determined that an alleged threatening text message had not been published because its contents were censored in the broadcast. Wright's appeal was denied by the Georgia Court of Appeals in November 2016.

Michelle also became involved in a prolonged public dispute with fellow R&B singer Tamar Braxton, which played out through social media and television appearances. Their disagreements emerged in the wake of Michelle's allegations against Wright, who was married to Braxton's friend Toya Wright. In 2013, Braxton tweeted, "Damn! I lost my wig," after Michelle appeared with a similar hairstyle, prompting Michelle to respond, "You didn't lose your wig, Kermit snatched it." Their subsequent exchanges included criticisms of each other's appearances and musical performances. In March 2015, Braxton became emotional on her talk show The Real while discussing how being compared to a Muppet had affected her self-image. She attributed the comparison to an unnamed person whom BET identified as Michelle. The two appeared to reconcile in June 2015, when they performed Patti LaBelle's "If Only You Knew" during a tribute at the 2015 BET Awards. Braxton apologized to Michelle, saying, "Life is all about forgiveness, love and unity," and expressed her forgiveness as well. Their disagreements resurfaced in April 2018 after Braxton criticized discounted cosmetic surgery procedures during an appearance on The Steve Harvey Show. Although she did not mention Michelle by name, the latter interpreted the remarks as a reference to her previous buttock injections and responded on social media. The dispute resurfaced in April 2024 after Braxton criticized the work of some unnamed Black performers in country music during an appearance on the We Sound Crazy podcast. Michelle interpreted the comments as directed toward her and responded on social media; Braxton subsequently denied referring to her, stating, "I wasn't speaking about you. I would have said your name."

=== Relationships and family ===
Michelle has one son, Chase Bowman (born September 29, 2004), whom she has largely kept out of the public eye.

Michelle dated English actor Idris Elba for approximately eight months in 2013; their relationship inspired material on her second studio album, Anybody Wanna Buy a Heart? (2014). Michelle also dated basketball player Bobby Maze around 2014, with whom she experienced a pregnancy before revealing in 2016 that she had an abortion following the end of their relationship. Her relationship with longtime friend and lover Melisia was featured during the third season of K. Michelle: My Life in 2017.

In 2016, Michelle began dating Dr. Kastan Sims, a Memphis-based dentist whom she had known since junior high school. In a 2017 interview with Essence, she said they had been friends for more than 19 years and that he knew her independently of her public persona. In 2022, they appeared on the WE TV reality television series Marriage Boot Camp: Hip Hop Edition, where they discussed relationship difficulties and their plans to start a family. After a period of separation, Sims proposed while Michelle was preparing to marry another man, prompting their reconciliation. They married privately in September 2025, which Michelle confirmed on Instagram, writing, "Been in love with you since Junior High School."

=== Health ===
In 2012, Michelle received illegal silicone injections in her buttocks and hips from a non-physician in Atlanta, who marketed the substance as "hydrogel". She later explained that she pursued the procedures after developing insecurities about her appearance and believing they could advance her music career, telling Essence, "I had just got a new record deal and I felt like the bigger the butt, the bigger the career." After approximately five years without significant complications, she began experiencing migraines, fatigue, and severe pain in her back and legs in 2017. During that year's health scare, Michelle reported that doctors had initially told her she had lupus, although subsequent testing produced inconclusive and negative results. She later explained that a full medical panel ruled out lupus and that imaging revealed silicone that had spread through her body, damaging surrounding tissue. She subsequently identified the injections as the source of her health problems.

In January 2018, Michelle underwent an initial procedure to remove the silicone, during which a surgeon attempted to extract the material through liposuction. The procedure caused the silicone to spread further through her body, and she was subsequently hospitalized and required two blood transfusions. By June, she had undergone four surgeries, including three additional procedures in April to remove dead and damaged tissue, and was still awaiting reconstructive surgery. She publicly discussed the complications on The Dr. Oz Show and documented her treatment and recovery during the fifth season of Love & Hip Hop: Hollywood in 2018, including a medical consultation and footage of the removal procedure. She subsequently continued undergoing corrective and reconstructive procedures, describing the process as a prolonged and physically difficult experience. In 2022, she discussed her experience in her Lifetime docuseries My Killer Body with K. Michelle, which explored the consequences of cosmetic procedures and followed her efforts to recover alongside other people experiencing complications. She explained that the silicone had become free-floating in her body and could not be completely removed through surgery.

In August 2025, Michelle experienced another complication shortly before performing at the Academy of Country Music Honors in Nashville, Tennessee. Fluid began leaking from an area affected by previous surgeries, leaving her clothing and a couch wet; she was initially unaware of the severity of the problem and performed after her team helped prepare her backstage. The incident and its aftermath were documented during the seventeenth season of The Real Housewives of Atlanta in 2026. Doctors subsequently identified an infection at a previous surgical site and Michelle underwent a two-hour reconstructive operation to remove dead and infected tissue. She explained that her ongoing complications resulted from the silicone injections rather than the subsequent fat-transfer procedure, stating that the silicone could never be completely removed from her body and that she would "never be fully healed". In an August 2026 interview on The Breakfast Club, Michelle said she had undergone 16 surgeries over nine years and described her most recent procedure as a scar revision. Later that month, she indicated that her reconstructive surgeries have now been completed.

== Discography ==
Studio albums

- Rebellious Soul (2013)
- Anybody Wanna Buy a Heart? (2014)
- More Issues Than Vogue (2016)
- Kimberly: The People I Used to Know (2017)
- All Monsters Are Human (2020)
- I'm the Problem (2023)
- Jesus & Whiskey (2026)

== Tours ==
Headlining

- Rebellious Soul Tour (2013)
- My Twisted Mind Tour (2015)
- Hello Kimberly Tour (2016)
- The People I Used to Know Tour (2018)
- O.S.D. Tour (2019)
- I'm the Problem Tour (2023)

Supporting

- Ladies Make Some Noise Tour (supporting R. Kelly) (2009)
- Blurred Lines Tour (supporting Robin Thicke) (2014)
- Love Hard Tour (supporting Keyshia Cole) (2024)

== Filmography ==
=== Film ===
Year	Film	Role	Notes
2014	Rebellious Soul Musical	Piper	Executive Producer

=== Television ===
Year	Title	Role	Notes
2012–13, 2016	Love & Hip Hop: Atlanta	Herself	
2013–14	Love & Hip Hop: New York	Herself	
2014–17	K. Michelle: My Life	Herself	Executive Producer
2015	Love & Hip Hop Live: The Wedding	Herself	
2015	Punk'd	Herself	
2015	L.A. Hair	Herself	
2016	Stevie J & Joseline: Go Hollywood	Herself	
2018–19	Leave It to Stevie	Guest	
2018–19	Love & Hip Hop: Hollywood	Herself	
2018–19	Killer Curves: Bodies to Die for	Herself	
2019	American Soul	Martha Reeves	
2022	Marriage Boot Camp	Herself	
2022	My Killer Body with K. Michelle	Herself	Executive Producer
2022	Single Black Female	Bebe	Television film
2022	Tamron Hall	Herself/Guest	Episode: K. Michelle & Tess Holliday
2024	Single Black Female 2: Simone's Revenge	Bebe	Television film
2024	Queens Court	Herself	Contestant
2025	Single Black Female 3: The Final Chapter	Bebe	Television film
2026–present	The Real Housewives of Atlanta	Herself	Main cast; Season 17–

== Awards and nominations ==
Year	Award	Category	Work	Result
2013	Soul Train Music Awards	Best New Artist	Herself	Won
2014	NAACP Image Awards	Outstanding New Artist	Herself	Won
2014	ASCAP Awards	Women Behind the Music	Herself	Honored
2014	BET Awards	Best Female R&B/Pop Artist	Herself	Nominated
2014	World Music Awards	World's Best Female Artist	Herself	Nominated
2014	World Music Awards	World's Best Album	Rebellious Soul	Nominated
2014	World Music Awards	World's Best Entertainer of the Year	Herself	Nominated
2014	World Music Awards	World's Best Live Act	Herself	Nominated
2015	BET Awards	Best Female R&B/Pop Artist	Herself	Nominated
2016	BET Awards	Best Female R&B/Pop Artist	Herself	Nominated
2016	BET Awards	Centric Award	"Not a Little Bit"	Nominated
2017	NAACP Image Awards	Outstanding Female Artist	Herself	Nominated
