= Lil' Ronnie =

- Born: Ronnie Jackson; 1983 (age 42–43); Kansas City, Missouri, U.S.
- Occupations: Record producer; songwriter; arranger; record executive; entrepreneur
- Years active: 2004–present

Ronnie Jackson (born 1983), known professionally as Lil' Ronnie, is an American record producer, songwriter, and entrepreneur based in Atlanta, Georgia. Best known for his work in R&B and hip-hop, he is the founder of Einnor Studios, a recording complex in Alpharetta. He has produced songs for Britney Spears, Usher, Mary J. Blige, Ciara, T-Pain, and GloRilla.

== Career ==
Jackson began his career in Kansas City before relocating to Atlanta. His first major commercial production was the 2006 single "I'm a Flirt" by Bow Wow featuring R. Kelly, which peaked at number one on the Billboard Hot Rap Tracks chart. Following this release, he signed a publishing deal with Jermaine Dupri's So So Def Recordings.

During the late 2000s and 2010s, Jackson produced R&B and pop tracks, including "Same Girl" for R. Kelly and Usher, "Lace and Leather" for Britney Spears' Circus, and "One Night" for Tyrese. He also produced the 2009 hit "Crazy Night" for R. Kelly featuring Rock City. In 2018, Jackson was a primary producer for Tamia's album Passion Like Fire, which received a nomination for Best R&B Album at the 61st Annual Grammy Awards.

In the 2020s, Jackson executive-produced K. Michelle's album I'm the Problem (2023). He produced the album's lead single, "Scooch", which reached number one on the Billboard Adult R&B Airplay chart. He also produced "Whatchu Kno About Me" (featuring Sexyy Red) for GloRilla's 2024 album Glorious.

== Einnor Studios ==
In 2021, Jackson opened Einnor Studios, a 100,000-square-foot audio production facility in Alpharetta, Georgia. The name "Einnor" is "Ronnie" spelled backward.

The facility contains five recording studios, including two main control rooms. Jackson collaborated with acoustician George Augspurger and Symphonic Acoustics to design custom dual-15" monitoring systems for the rooms. The studio's flagship room, designated "A1", is equipped with a 32-channel Solid State Logic (SSL) Origin analog console. The "A2" studio features a Neve Genesys Black G16 mixing console. The complex also features hospitality and residential amenities, including a gym and a 24-hour liquor license.

== Selected production credits ==
=== 2004 ===
- Ruben Studdard – Soulful
  - "Sorry 2004"

=== 2006 ===
- Bow Wow – The Price of Fame
  - "I'm a Flirt" (featuring R. Kelly)
  - "Give It to You"
  - "Price of Fame"

=== 2007 ===
- R. Kelly – Double Up
  - "Same Girl" (featuring Usher)
  - "Hook It Up" (featuring Huey)
  - "I'm a Flirt (Remix)" (featuring T.I. and T-Pain)

=== 2008 ===
- Britney Spears – Circus
  - "Lace and Leather"

=== 2009 ===
- Ciara – Fantasy Ride
  - "Tell Me What Your Name Is"
- R. Kelly – Untitled
  - "Crazy Night" (featuring Rock City)

=== 2010 ===
- Jessica Mauboy – Get 'Em Girls
  - "Foreign"
  - "No One Like You"
- Raheem DeVaughn – The Love & War MasterPeace
  - "Black & Blue"
  - "Microphone"
  - "X.O.X.O."

=== 2011 ===
- Lupe Fiasco – Lasers
  - "Out of My Head" (featuring Trey Songz)
- Mary J. Blige – My Life II... The Journey Continues (Act 1)
  - "Get It Right"
- Musiq Soulchild – MusiqInTheMagiq
  - "Backtowhere"
  - "Goodgirl"
  - "Single"
- Tyrese – Open Invitation
  - "It's All on Me"
  - "One Night"

=== 2012 ===
- 2 Chainz – Based on a T.R.U. Story
  - "In Town" (featuring Mike Posner)
- Ashanti – Braveheart
  - "That's What We Do" (featuring R. Kelly)

=== 2014 ===
- J. Holiday – Guilty Conscience
  - "Incredible"
  - "After We Fuck"
  - "Home Wrecker"
  - "Guilty Conscience"
  - "Ms. Get Around"
  - "Wrong Turn"
- K. Michelle – Anybody Wanna Buy a Heart?
  - "Build a Man"
  - "Cry"
  - "God I Get It"
  - "How Do You Know?"
  - "Love 'Em All"

=== 2015 ===
- Ludacris – Ludaversal
  - "Get Lit"
- Tamia – Love Life
  - "Chaise Lounge"
  - "Like You Do"

=== 2016 ===
- K. Michelle – More Issues Than Vogue
  - "All I Got"
  - "Rich" (featuring Yo Gotti and Trina)

=== 2017 ===
- Bell Biv DeVoe – Three Stripes
  - "Incredible"
- K. Michelle – Kimberly: The People I Used to Know
  - "Crazy Like You"
  - "Either Way" (featuring Chris Brown)
  - "Make This Song Cry"
  - "No Not You"
  - "Talk to God"

=== 2018 ===
- Tamia – Passion Like Fire
  - "If I Had to Choose"
  - "It's Yours"
  - "Lost in You"
  - "Not for Long"
  - "Today I Do"
  - "When the Sun Comes Up"

=== 2020 ===
- K. Michelle – All Monsters Are Human
  - "Just Like Jay"
  - "That Game"
  - "The Rain"
  - "All the Lovers"
  - "Something New"
  - "Ciara's Prayer"
  - "Supahood" (featuring Kash Doll and City Girls)
- Queen Naija – Missunderstood
  - "Too Much to Say"
  - "Pretend"

=== 2022 ===
- K. Michelle – I'm the Problem (Single)
  - "Scooch"

=== 2023 ===
- K. Michelle – I'm the Problem
  - "Scooch"
  - "Blame Yourself"
  - "I Cheat"
  - "You"

=== 2024 ===
- GloRilla – Glorious
  - "Yeah Glo!"
  - "Whatchu Kno About Me" (featuring Sexyy Red)
  - "Never Find" (featuring K Carbon)
- Koryn Hawthorne – On God
  - "On God"

=== 2025 ===
- Cieratherapper – Non-album single
  - "Tabletops"

=== Songwriting Only ===
- GloRilla – Glorious
  - "TGIF" (Co-writer)
  - "Wanna Be" (featuring Megan Thee Stallion) (Co-writer)
  - "Don't Deserve" (featuring Muni Long) (Co-writer)
- Cardi B – Am I the Drama? (2025)
  - "ErrTime" (Co-writer)
  - "ErrTime (feat. Latto) [Remix]" (Co-writer)
  - "ErrTime (feat. Jeezy) [Remix]" (Co-writer)

== Notes ==
- ^{^[A]} denotes co-producer
