= Justice Crew discography =

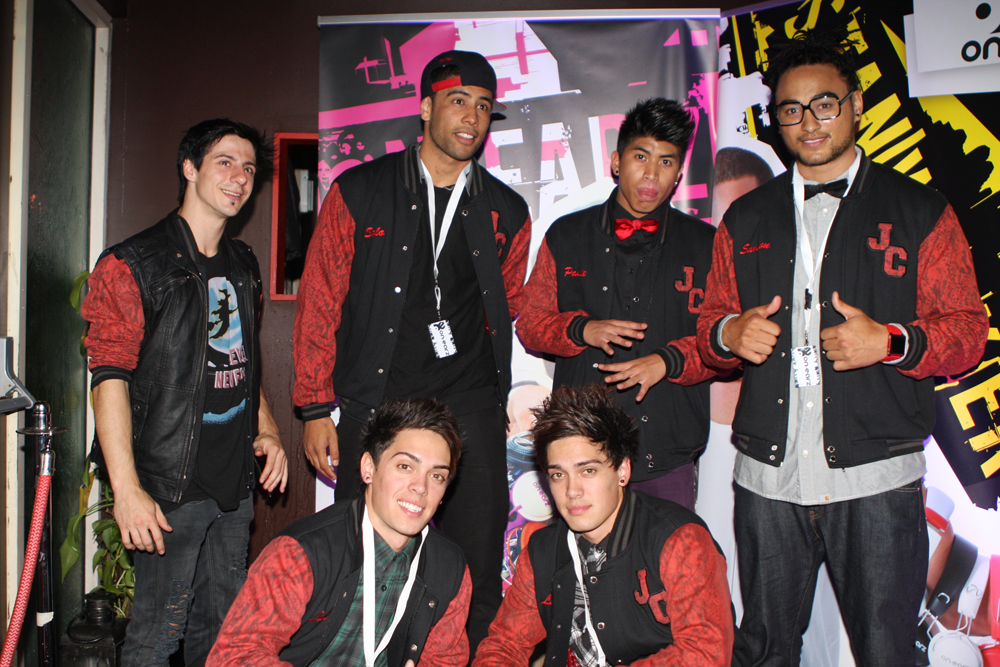
- Justice Crew in May 2012
- Studio albums: 1
- Compilation albums: 1
- Singles: 16
- Video albums: 1
- Music videos: 13
- Album appearances: 1

The discography of Australian hip-hop dance and pop music group Justice Crew consists of one studio album, one compilation album, one video album, sixteen singles (including one as a featured artist), one album appearance and thirteen music videos.

== Albums ==
=== Studio albums ===
List of studio albums with Australian chart positions
Title	Album details	Peak chart positions
Title	Album details	AUS
Live by the Words	Released: 28 November 2014 (Australia); Label: Sony Music Australia; Formats: CD, digital download	7

=== Compilation albums ===
List of compilation albums, with Australian chart positions
Title	Album details	Peak chart positions
Title	Album details	AUS Compilation
Justice Crew Party Mix	Released: 18 November 2011 (Australia); Label: Sony Music Australia; Formats: CD, digital download	5

== Singles ==
=== As lead artist ===
List of singles, with selected chart positions
Title	Year	Peak chart positions				Certifications	Album
Title	Year	AUS	NZ	GER	KOR	Certifications	Album
"And Then We Dance"	2010	26	—	—	—	ARIA: Platinum	Justice Crew Party Mix
"Friday to Sunday"	2010	18	—	—	—	ARIA: 2× Platinum	Justice Crew Party Mix
"Dance with Me" (featuring Flo Rida)	2011	44	—	—	—	ARIA: Gold	Justice Crew Party Mix
"Sexy and You Know It"	2011	—	—	—	—		Justice Crew Party Mix
"Boom Boom"	2012	1	3	46	—	ARIA: 6× Platinum; RMNZ: 2× Platinum	Live by the Words
"Gonna Make You Sweat (Everybody Dance Now)" (featuring Bonnie Anderson)	2012	—	—	—	—		Non-album single
"Best Night"	2012	7	24	—	—	ARIA: 2× Platinum	Live by the Words
"Everybody"	2013	6	25	—	18	ARIA: 2× Platinum	Live by the Words
"I Am Australian" (with Dami Im, Jessica Mauboy, Nathaniel Willemse, Samantha Jade and Taylor Henderson)	2014	51	—	—	—		Non-album single
"Que Sera"	2014	1	14	—	—	ARIA: 5× Platinum; RMNZ: Gold	Live by the Words
"Rise & Fall"	2014	11	—	—	—	ARIA: Gold	Live by the Words
"I Love My Life"	2015	68	—	—	—		Live by the Words
"Good Time"	2015	79	—	—	—		Non-album singles
"Pop Dat Buckle"	2016	102	—	—	—		Non-album singles
"So Long"	2019	—	—	—	—		Non-album singles
"—" denotes a single that did not chart in that country.

=== As featured artist ===
List of featured singles, with selected chart positions
Title	Year	Peak chart positions
Title	Year	AUS
"Where You From?" (Beau Ryan featuring Justice Crew)	2014	19

=== Charity singles ===
List of charity singles
Title	Year	Peak chart positions	Notes
Title	Year	AUS	Notes
"Happy" (with The X Factor Top 6 finalists 2014)	2014	—	A cover of Pharrell Williams' song "Happy". It was recorded for Sony Foundation's youth cancer program You Can, and released to help raise funds for You Can to establish specialised youth cancer centres across Australia.
"—" denotes a single that did not chart

== Album appearances ==
List of album appearances
Title	Year	Album
"Mistletoe"	2012	The Spirit of Christmas 2012

== Videography ==
=== Video albums ===
List of video albums
Title	Album details
And Then We Dance	Released: 27 September 2010 (Australia); Label: Sony Music Australia; Formats: DVD

=== Music videos ===
List of music videos
Title	Year	Director(s)
"And Then We Dance"	2010	Marc Furmie
"Friday to Sunday"	2010	Alex Goddard
"Dance with Me"	2011	Matt Alonzo
"Sexy and You Know It"	2011	
"Barbie Girl" (with Sam Kekovich and Melissa Tkautz)	2012	
"Boom Boom"	2012	
"Best Night"	2012	Marc Furmie
"Everybody"	2013	Soup Kitchen Films
"Que Sera" (Australian version)	2014	
"Que Sera" (International version)	2014	
"Where You From?"	2014	
"Rise & Fall"	2014	
"I Love My Life"	2015	
"Pop Dat Buckle"	2016	
