= I Love My Life =

Single by Justice Crew

from the album Live by the Words
- Released: 3 April 2015
- Genre: Pop
- Length: 3:36
- Label: Sony
- Songwriters: Lukas Bellesini; Jayson DeZuzio; Wolfgang Gartner; Mason "MdL" Levy; Mike Posner; Solo Tohi

Justice Crew singles chronology
"Rise & Fall" (2014)	"I Love My Life" (2015)	"Good Time" (2015)

"I Love My Life" is a song recorded by Australian pop group Justice Crew for their debut studio album Live by the Words (2014). It was released on 3 April 2015 as the sixth single from the album. The song was written by Lukas Bellesini, Jayson DeZuzio, Wolfgang Gartner, Mason "MdL" Levy, Mike Posner and Solo Tohi. Upon its release, "I Love My Life" received positive reviews from various publications and debuted at number 68 on the ARIA Singles Chart. The accompanying music video was filmed at the Parramatta plaza using a one-shot-camera technique and features cameo appearances by Beau Ryan, YouTube beauty vlogger Brittney Lee Saunders and pranksters The Royal Stampede. Justice Crew promoted the song with performances at Westfield Miranda and on Sunrise.

== Background and reception ==
"I Love My Life" was written by Lukas Bellesini, Jayson DeZuzio, Wolfgang Gartner, Mason "MdL" Levy, Mike Posner and Solo Tohi. Group member Paul "Paulie" Merciadez said, "When we first heard it, we thought straightaway, 'this describes me'! We love our life, the way things are, what we do and the friends we have around us. It's why we celebrate, and it's why we are where we are now – because we love what we do, and we do what we love." The song was released physically on 3 April 2015 as the sixth single from Justice Crew's debut studio album Live by the Words. The physical release features a Matt Watkins remix of "I Love My Life".

Brad of Auspop wrote that "I Love My Life" sounds "quite good with its summery guitar riff" but criticised its lyrics as "a bit clumsy". Nic Kelly of Project U felt that the track was "not ARIA-chart record breaking but it's a bit of fun and the hook's pretty decent." K-Zone magazine simply called it a cool single. For the week dated 20 April 2015, "I Love My Life" debuted at number 68 on the ARIA Singles Chart and became Justice Crew's eleventh top one hundred entry.

== Music video and promotion ==
The accompanying music video was filmed in early March 2015 at the Parramatta plaza using a one-shot-camera technique. It premiered on Justice Crew's Vevo channel on YouTube on 31 March 2015, and features cameo appearances by The Footy Show's Beau Ryan, YouTube beauty vlogger Brittney Lee Saunders and pranksters The Royal Stampede. Amnplify wrote that the video "features an impressive and colourful choreographed dance routine" from Justice Crew, while Chris of Joy 94.9 noted that it "showcases their singing, dancing and athleticism". Damian of Auspop also noted that "there's plenty of the boys' trademark dance moves" in the video and added "there's no doubt that this one took some serious planning, so props."

Justice Crew performed "I Love My Life" during an instore appearance at Westfield Miranda on 12 April 2015, and on Sunrise on 13 April 2015.

== Track listing ==
- CD single
1. "I Love My Life" – 3:36
2. "I Love My Life" (Matt Watkins Remix)

== Charts ==
Chart (2015)	Peak position
Australia (ARIA)	68

== Release history ==
Country	Date	Format	Label
Australia	3 April 2015	CD single	Sony Music Australia
