= Rise & Fall (Justice Crew song) =

Single by Justice Crew

from the album Live by the Words
- Released: 24 October 2014
- Recorded: 2014
- Length: 3:44
- Label: Sony
- Songwriter(s): Justice Crew
- Producer(s): Justice Crew

Justice Crew singles chronology
"Where You From?" (2014)	"Rise & Fall" (2014)	"I Love My Life" (2015)

Music video
- "Rise & Fall" on YouTube

"Rise & Fall" is a song recorded by Australian dance-pop group Justice Crew. It was released digitally and physically on 24 October 2014, as the fifth single from their debut studio album Live by the Words. It was written and produced by Robopop with Emily Laura Katter, Sam Nicolosi and DNA Songs and is a mid-tempo pop track. It debuted at number 11 in Australia.

== Background and release ==
Following the success of "Que Sera", Justice Crew featured on Beau Ryan's single "Where You From?" and announced their new single would be titled "Rise & Fall" on 26 September.

On Rise & Fall, Justice Crew turn away from the house music sound by experimenting with soft-rock. Justice Crew member John Pearce explains, "We have had our pop music and our club bangers, but we edged off to the side with 'Que Sera' and now with 'Rise & Fall' we are exploring a whole new side to Justice Crew. It's got a sort of 'love' meaning behind it... it is a romantic song, but the lyrics are really metaphorical." "'Rise & Fall' is definitely a new sound for us, but I think it's a really good direction that we're heading in. We're really excited to see what people think."

== Music videos ==
The music video was filmed on Daydream Island and features the boys walking along the beach, swimming, cuddling with women by the campfire and walking hand in hand into the sunset. The video was released via Justice Crew's Vevo account on 30 October.

== Track listing ==
- Digital download
1. "Rise & Fall" – 3:44
- CD single
1. "Rise & Fall" – 3:44
2. "Rise & Fall" – 3:44 (karaoke version)

== Charts and certifications ==
=== Weekly charts ===
Chart (2014)	Peak position
Australia (ARIA)	11
Australia Urban (ARIA)	1

=== Year-end charts ===
Chart (2014)	Position
Australian Artist Singles (ARIA)	44
Australian Urban Singles (ARIA)	31

=== Certifications ===
Region	Certification	Certified units/sales
Australia (ARIA)	Gold	35,000^{^}
^{^} Shipments figures based on certification alone.

== Release history ==
Region	Date	Format	Label
Australia	24 October 2014	Digital download	Sony Music Australia
Australia	24 October 2014	CD single	Sony Music Australia
