= Live by the Words =

Studio album by Justice Crew
- Released: 28 November 2014
- Recorded: 2012–2014
- Genre: Pop
- Length: 39:58
- Label: Sony Music Australia
- Producer: various

Justice Crew chronology
Justice Crew Party Mix (2011)	Live by the Words (2014)

Singles from Live by the Words
- 1. "Boom Boom" Released: 2 July 2012; 2. "Best Night" Released: 30 November 2012; 3. "Everybody" Released: 11 October 2013; 4. "Que Sera" Released: 2 May 2014; 5. "Rise & Fall" Released: 24 October 2014; 6. "I Love My Life" Released: 3 April 2015

Live by the Words is the debut studio album by Australian pop music group Justice Crew, released on 28 November 2014 through Sony Music Australia. The album debuted and peaked at number seven on the Australian ARIA Albums Chart following its release.

The album produced five singles including the number-one hits, "Boom Boom" and "Que Sera". The former earned Justice Crew their first number-one hit whilst the latter spent more weeks at the top spot than any other Australian number-one single. Subsequent singles, "Best Night" and "Everybody" both charted in the top ten whilst fifth single, "Rise & Fall" reached number eleven.

== Background ==
On 4 November 2014, Justice Crew announced via Facebook that their debut studio album, Live by the Words was set for release on 28 November 2014. Recorded between 2012 and 2014, the album features both previously released singles and newly recorded material and includes contributions from Mike Posner, Nasri, Robopop, Danny Mercer and DNA Songs among others. Band member, John Len Ruela Pearce made the following comment when speaking about the album's release:

"We are so excited to release our first full-length studio album! It feels great to have a body work such as Live by the Words which really showcases us as artists, and we are really pumped for all of our fans to hear it".

== Singles ==
The album was preceded by its five singles beginning with "Boom Boom". Released in June 2012 the song entered the Australian ARIA Singles Chart at number twenty-four and eventually reached the top of the chart, thereby becoming Justice Crew's first number-one hit. It was certified 6× Platinum by the Australian Recording Industry Association (ARIA) the following year, denoting shipments in excess of 420,000 copies. "Best Night" followed in January 2013 and became the group's second consecutive top ten hit, peaking at number-seven and subsequently attained a double platinum certification from ARIA. It also replaced "Tik Tok" by Kesha as the theme song to the Australian competitive cooking game show, My Kitchen Rules from the fourth season onwards.

"Everybody", the album's third single, was released exactly nine months after its predecessor and became the group's third consecutive top ten hit and multi-platinum certified single. In May 2014, "Que Sera" was released as the album's fourth single, a week earlier than scheduled due to the Seven Network's usage of the song in commercials for the fifth season of My Kitchen Rules. Following its release, "Que Sera" debuted and peaked at number-one for nine consecutive weeks in Australia, thus becoming the group's second chart topper and the longest running number-one single by an Australian artist in ARIA Charts history. Fifth single, "Rise & Fall" was not as commercially successful as its predecessors, peaking just outside the top ten at number eleven. The sixth single "I Love My Life" was released on 3 April 2015.

== Commercial performance ==
For the issue dated 8 December 2014, Live by the Words debuted at number-seven on the Australian ARIA Albums Chart and number-one on the ARIA Urban Albums Chart.

== Track listing ==
No.	Title	Writer(s)	Length
1.	"Intro"	Justice Crew, Khaled Rohaim	0:49
2.	"Que Sera"	Justice Crew, Adam Messinger, Nic Martin, Nasri Atweh, Nolan Lambroza	3:32
3.	"Fly"	Marco Borrero, David Musumeci, Anthony Egizii, Mitch Allen	3:38
4.	"Rise & Fall"	Musumeci, Egizii, Daniel Omelio	3:43
5.	"Interlude"	Justice Crew, Rohaim	0:35
6.	"Boom Boom"	Jeremy Skaller, Kamaljit Jhooti, Rohaim, Marlin "Hookman" Bonds, Robert Larow	3:07
7.	"I Love My Life"	Mason Levy, Mike Posner, Jayson DeZuzio	3:36
8.	"Best Night"	Jared Cotter, Larow, Anthony Hannides, Michael Hannides, Rohaim, Jay Sean, Skaller	3:35
9.	"Always Been Real"	Bonds, Rohaim, Skaller	3:10
10.	"Everybody"	Justice Crew, Danny Mercer, Erick Orrosquieta, Morgan Jackson	3:52
11.	"Life's a Party"	Justice Crew, Andy Marsh	3:06
12.	"Ride Until the Sun"	Chaz Mishan, David Delazyn, Jake Miller, Zac Poor	2:44
Total length:			39:58

== Charts ==
=== Weekly charts ===
Chart (2014)	Peak position
Australian Albums (ARIA)	7
Australian Urban Albums (ARIA)	1

=== Year-end charts ===
Chart (2014)	Rank
Australian Artist Albums Chart	35
Australian Urban Albums Chart	14

== Release history ==
Region	Date	Format	Label	Catalogue	Ref.
Australia	28 November 2014	CD; digital download	Sony Music Australia	88875012922	
