= Where You From? =

Single by Beau Ryan

Single by Beau Ryan featuring Justice Crew
- Released: 19 September 2014
- Recorded: 2014
- Genre: Pop
- Length: 3:35
- Label: Sony
- Songwriters: Beau Ryan, Justice Crew
- Producer: Beau Ryan

Justice Crew singles chronology
"Que Sera" (2014)	"Where You From?" (2014)	"Rise & Fall" (2014)

Music video
- "Where You From?" on YouTube

"Where You From?" is the debut single by retired Australian professional rugby league footballer and television personality Beau Ryan, featuring Justice Crew. It was released digitally via Sony Music Australia on 19 September 2014. It debuted at number 19 on the ARIA Singles Chart.

== Background ==
"Where You From?" materialised after Beau Ryan's manager met Denis Handlin from Sony. They discussed the possibility of Ryan recording a song. Ryan wanted it to be a light-hearted, fun song, representing the various origins of Australians. As Ryan admitted that he is not really a singer, he collaborated with Justice Crew to assist him. He also had Delta Goodrem to give him personal singing lessons.

Ryan wrote most of the lyrics of "Where You From?", which celebrates multiculturalism in Australia, mentioning several nationalities and suburbs.

== Promotion ==
Ryan headed on a national shopping centre signing tour to support the release.

== Video ==
The video was filmed in Sydney's Western Suburbs and was released via Beau Ryan's VEVO account on 18 September 2014.

== Track listing ==
- Digital download
  1. "Where You From?" featuring Justice Crew – 3:25

== Charts ==
Chart (2014)	Peak position
Australia (ARIA)	19
Australian Artist Singles (ARIA)	4

=== Year-end chart ===
Chart (2014)	Rank
Australian Artist Singles Chart	39
