= Good Time (Justice Crew song) =

Single by Justice Crew
- Released: 13 November 2015
- Genre: Pop
- Length: 3:14
- Label: Sony
- Songwriters: Dante Jones; Andrew Bolooki

Justice Crew singles chronology
"I Love My Life" (2015)	"Good Time" (2015)

"Good Time" is a song recorded by Australian pop group Justice Crew. The single was released on 13 November 2015. Upon its release, "Good Time" debuted at number 79 on the ARIA Singles Chart.

The group said; "Our single "Good time" is all about the title itself. As a group when we first heard the demo we thought it fitted us well. As majority of us come from a break dancing background it has that kind of funk to it and that's what we loved about it." The group added; "The song itself came from Jason Derulo's team. Anything that comes from him is always good. Recording it was a long process, as each time we heard a cut we kept on wanting to add on and make it more of a Justice Crew sound."

Justice Crew performed the song on The X Factor Australia on 17 November.

== Music video and promotion ==
The accompanying music video was released on 17 November 2015. and centres around the boys inside a studio set-up, with a car and a fancy retro vinyl player for company.

== Track listing ==
- Digital download
1. "Good Time" – 3:14
- CD single
1. "Good Time" – 3:14
2. "Good Time" (instrumental) – 3:14

== Charts ==
Chart (2015)	Peak position
Australia (ARIA)	79

== Release history ==
Region	Date	Format	Label	Catalogue
Australia	13 November 2015	Digital download	Sony Music Australia	-
Australia	20 November 2015	CD single	Sony Music Australia	88875163962
