= Best Night =

Single by Justice Crew

from the album Live by the Words
- Released: 30 November 2012
- Recorded: 2012
- Genre: Dance-pop
- Length: 3:33
- Label: Sony
- Songwriters: Jeremy Skaller, Jay Sean, Jared Cotter, Rob Larow, Khaled Rohaim, Michael Hannides, Anthony Hannides, Blessed Samuel Joe-Andah

Justice Crew singles chronology
"Gonna Make You Sweat (Everybody Dance Now)" (2012)	"Best Night" (2012)	"Everybody" (2013)

"Best Night" is a song recorded by Australian hip hop dance and pop group Justice Crew. "Best Night" was released digitally and physically in Australia on 30 November 2012, as the group's seventh overall single and the second single from their debut studio album Live by the Words (2014). It peaked at number seven on the ARIA Singles Chart and was certified two times platinum by the Australian Recording Industry Association, denoting sales of 140,000 copies.

"Best Night" was nominated for Song of the Year at the 2013 ARIA Music Awards. The Marc Furmie directed music video was nominated for Best Video.

== Music video ==
The music video for "Best Night" was directed by Marc Furmie and released on 4 December 2012. It shows the boys partying and riding in a limousine. The video was nominated for Best Video at the 2013 ARIA Music Awards.

== Track listing ==
- Digital download
1. "Best Night" – 3:33
- CD single
1. "Best Night" – 3:33
2. "Boom Boom" – 3:05
3. "Gonna Make You Sweat (Everybody Dance Now)" – 3:26
4. "Friday to Sunday" – 3:12

== Charts ==
"Best Night" debuted at number 12 on the ARIA Singles Chart on 10 December 2012, and peaked at number 7 in its third week in the chart. It was certified two times platinum by the Australian Recording Industry Association for selling 140,000 copies. In New Zealand, the song debuted at number 39 on 14 January 2013, and peaked at number 24 the following week.

=== Weekly charts ===
Chart (2012–13)	Peak Position
Australia (ARIA)	7
New Zealand (Recorded Music NZ)	24

=== Year-end charts ===
Chart (2012)	Position
Australian Artist Singles Chart	19

Chart (2013)	Position
Australian Artist Singles Chart	29

== Certifications ==
Region	Certification	Certified units/sales
Australia (ARIA)	2× Platinum	140,000^{^}
New Zealand (RMNZ)	Gold	7,500^{*}
^{*} Sales figures based on certification alone.^{^} Shipments figures based on certification alone.

== Release history ==
Region	Date	Format	Label
Australia	30 November 2012	CD single, digital download	Sony Music Australia
New Zealand	30 November 2012	CD single, digital download	Sony Music Australia
