= Dance with Me (Justice Crew song) =

Single by Justice Crew featuring Flo Rida
- Released: 29 March 2011
- Recorded: Los Angeles, California
- Genre: Pop
- Length: 3:46
- Label: Sony Music
- Songwriters: Christopher Rojas, Larry Nacht, Tramar Dillard, Winston Thomas, Danny Schofield, Aaron Carter

Justice Crew singles chronology
"Friday to Sunday" (2010)	"Dance with Me" (2011)	"Sexy and You Know It" (2011)

Flo Rida singles chronology
"Who Dat Girl" (2011)	"Dance with Me" (2011)	"Where Them Girls At" (2011)

"Dance with Me" is a song by Australian hip hop dance and pop group, Justice Crew, featuring American rapper Flo Rida. The song marks the first released by Justice Crew since Anastasios left the group. It was released digitally on 29 March 2011, as their third overall single. "Dance with Me" peaked at number 44 on the ARIA Singles Chart and was certified gold by the Australian Recording Industry Association (ARIA). An accompanying music video was directed by Matt Alonzo, and features Justice Crew in a warehouse having a dance-battle with all-female dance crew, Beat Freaks.

== Background ==
Justice Crew recorded "Dance with Me" with American rapper Flo Rida in Los Angeles, California. On working with Justice Crew, Rida said in an interview with The Daily Telegraph, "It was a pleasure working with Justice Crew, the song is crazy. I definitely look forward to working with them again in the future." "Dance with Me" was originally recorded by Aaron Carter in 2009. The single cover was revealed on 18 March 2011, and showed Justice Crew wearing black clothes, and posing in front of a background of flames. "Dance with Me" was released digitally on 29 March 2011, before being serviced to Australian contemporary hit radio on 1 April.

== Chart performance ==
"Dance with Me" debuted and peaked at number 44 on the ARIA Singles Chart on 2 May 2011. The following week, it fell four spots down to number 48. The song was considerably more successful on the ARIA Urban Singles Chart, where it peaked at number 13. "Dance with Me" was certified gold by the Australian Recording Industry Association (ARIA), for selling 35,000 digital copies.

== Music video ==
The music video for the song was directed by Matt Alonzo and was filmed in Los Angeles. A fifty-two second trailer of the video was premiered on YouTube on 18 March 2011, and showed Justice Crew in a warehouse with appearances by Flo Rida and all-female dance crew, Beat Freaks, from MTV's America's Best Dance Crew. The complete video premiered on Vevo on 4 April.

The video opens in a warehouse, with Flo Rida rapping his verse to the song while Justice Crew dance in the background. The video then shows Justice Crew wearing black clothes and standing in the rain, while Paul and John sing their verses. In between this scene, a dance-battle between Justice Crew and Battle Freaks begins, and reoccurs throughout the whole video. As Len begins his verse, Justice Crew then appear in front of a background of flames doing various routines. The video then continues when Justice Crew and Beat Freaks end up dancing together. After more dancing from Justice Crew in various scenes, the video then ends with them wearing no shirts.

== Promotion ==
Justice Crew performed "Dance with Me" on Chris Brown's Australian F.A.M.E. Tour in April 2011. In May 2011, Swisse Vitamins used the song for their television commercial. Justice Crew appeared in the commercial doing various dance routines on different coloured backdrops.

== Track listing ==
- Digital download
1. "Dance with Me" featuring Flo Rida (Radio Edit) –3:46
2. "Friday to Sunday" (DJ KCB's Dutch Mix) – 4:40

== Charts and certification ==
=== Weekly chart ===
Chart (2011)	Peak position
ARIA Singles Chart	44
ARIA Urban Singles Chart	13

=== Year-end chart ===
Chart (2011)	Rank
Australian Artists Singles Chart	37

=== Certification ===
Country	Certification
Australia	Gold

== Release history ==
Region	Date	Format	Label
Australia	29 March 2011	Digital download	Sony Music Australia
Australia	8 April 2011	Digital download	Sony Music Australia
