= John Pearce (singer) =

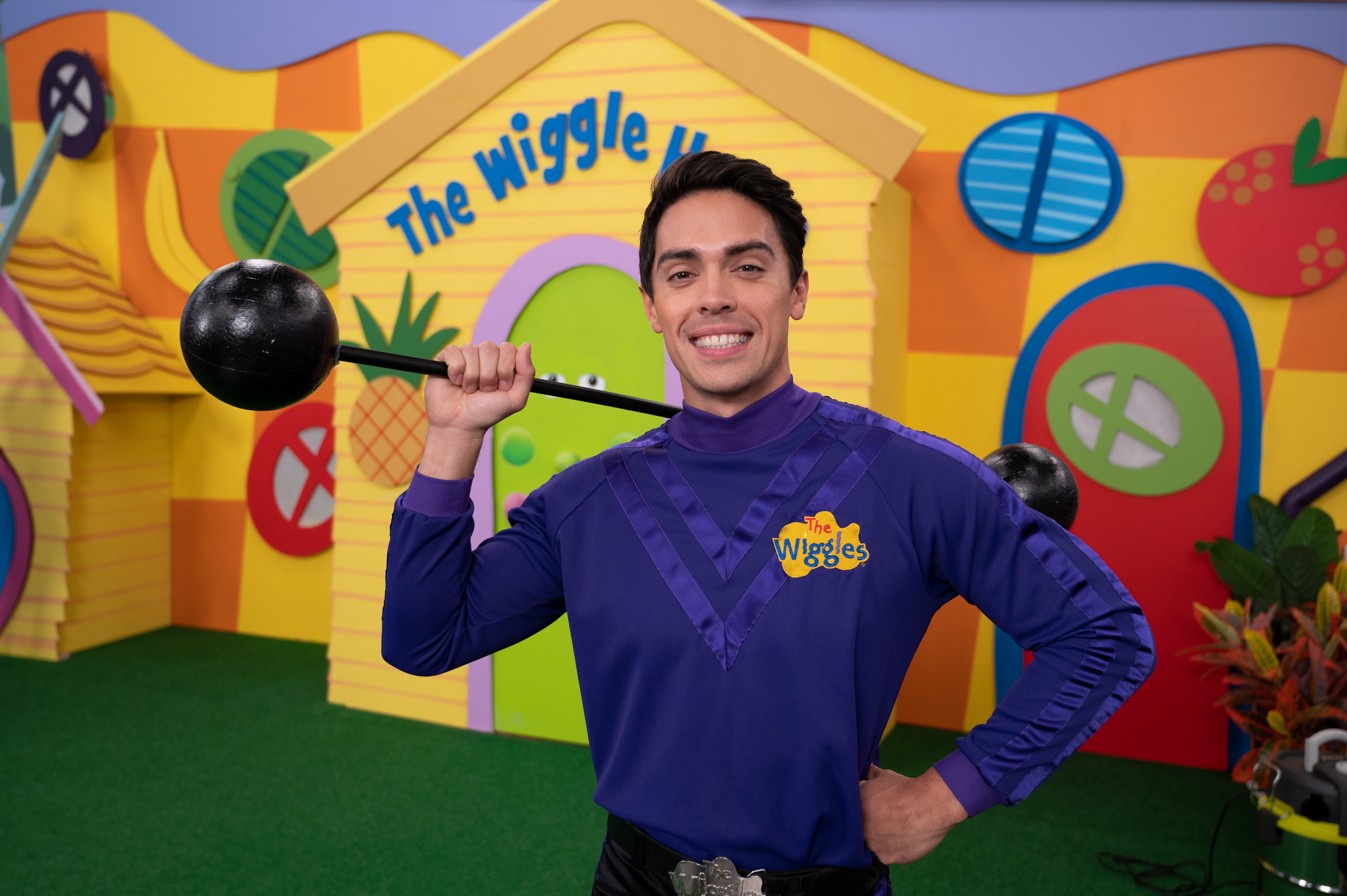

Background information
- Born: John Len Ruela Pearce; 25 February 1993 (age 33); Australia
- Occupations: Dancer; singer
- Years active: 2009–present
- Member of: Justice Crew; The Wiggles
- Spouse: Jessie Adamo (m. 2019)

John Len Ruela Adamo Pearce (born 25 February 1993) is an Australian singer, dancer and children's entertainer best known as a member of Justice Crew, and also a member of the children's band The Wiggles where he wears the purple skivvy alongside Lachlan Gillespie.

== Early life and education ==
Pearce was born to a Filipina mother and an Australian father. His twin brother Len was also a member of Justice Crew.

== Career ==
=== Justice Crew ===
Pearce was a member of Justice Crew when the group came to prominence winning the 2010 season of Australia's Got Talent. During his time with the group, they released two ARIA chart-topping songs and two further top ten singles, and earned eight ARIA Award nominations.

=== The Wiggles ===
In 2021, Pearce joined The Wiggles in the group's expansion from four to eight performers. As "Big Strong John", he wears a purple skivvy, and has an interest in health and exercise. Pearce's television debut for The Wiggles was in the Fruit Salad TV YouTube series, and in 2022 embarked on the national Australian "Fruit Salad TV Big Show" arena tour with the band.

In January 2023, Pearce received international media attention in response to his viral popularity amongst parents of Wiggles fans, due to his handsome appearance and his promotion of healthy habits.

=== Other works ===
Pearce also worked as a personal trainer and appeared in the 2017 season of Australian Ninja Warrior.

== Personal life ==
Pearce married Jessie Adamo in 2019, having been in a relationship since 2012. In December 2024, the couple had their first child, Henry.
