= And Then We Dance =

Single by Justice Crew
- Released: 27 August 2010
- Recorded: 2010
- Genre: Electropop
- Length: 3:00
- Label: Sony Music
- Songwriters: Darhyl Camper, Nicholas "RAS" Furlong, Jordan Suecof
- Producers: Darhyl Camper, Nicholas "RAS" Furlong, Jordan Suecof (infinity)

Justice Crew singles chronology
"And Then We Dance" (2010)	"Friday to Sunday" (2010)

"And Then We Dance" is the debut single by season four winners of Australia's Got Talent, Justice Crew. It was written and produced by Darhyl Camper, Nicholas "RAS" Furlong and Jordan "Infinity" Suecof. The song was released digitally on 27 August 2010. "And Then We Dance" peaked at number 26 on the ARIA Singles Chart and was certified platinum by the Australian Recording Industry Association (ARIA). An accompanying music video was directed by Marc Furmie, and features Justice Crew performing several types of dance routines in an underground parking lot.

== Background and release ==
On 12 August 2010, it was announced that Justice Crew had signed a recording contract with Sony Music Australia. Emmanuel Rodriguez, a member of the group said: "Sony asked if any of us could sing and we showed them what we could do. A week later, we were in the recording studio." "And Then We Dance" was written and produced by Darhyl Camper, Nicholas "RAS" Furlong and Jordan Seucof. A preview of the song was released on YouTube on 16 August, and the single cover was revealed on 20 August. "And Then We Dance" was sent to Australian contemporary hit radio on 23 August, and was released digitally on 27 August. The Compact Disc single was also released the same date.

== Chart performance ==
On 13 September 2010, "And Then We Dance" debuted at number 46 on the ARIA Singles Chart, and peaked at number 26 on 11 October. The song was certified platinum by the Australian Recording Industry Association (ARIA), for selling 70,000 copies.

== Music video and live performances ==
The music video for the song was directed by Marc Furmie and was filmed in a parking lot near the Acer Arena in Sydney. The video premiered online on 27 August 2010. Throughout the video, it shows Justice Crew in an underground parking lot performing several types of dance routines, including b-boying and krumping, as well as backflips. During most scenes in the video, they are seen dressed in the colours of maroon, white and navy blue.

In August 2010, Justice Crew performed "And Then We Dance" on Sunrise. They also held an instore performance of the song at the Sanity music store in Westfield Hurstville on 7 September . On 27 September, Justice Crew performed the song on The X Factor (Australia), and at the 2010 NRL Grand Final on 3 October. Justice Crew held more instore performances of "And Then We Dance" at the Richmond Records store in Windsor, New South Wales on 16 October, and at Westfield Liverpool on 28 October 2010.

== Track listing ==
- Digital download
1. "And Then We Dance" – 3:00

== Personnel ==
- Tom Coyne – mastering engineer
- Justice Crew – vocals
- Damien Lewis – mastering engineer
- Darhyl Camper – production, writing
- Nicholas "RAS" Furlong – production, writing
- Phil Tan – mixing engineer
- Jordan"Infinity"Suecof – production, writing

== Charts and certification ==
=== Weekly charts ===
Chart (2010)	Peak position
ARIA Singles Chart	26

=== Year-end charts ===
Chart (2010)	Position
Australian Artists Singles Chart	42

=== Certification ===
Country	Certification
Australia	Platinum
