= Que Sera (Justice Crew song) =

Single by Justice Crew

from the album Live by the Words
- Released: 2 May 2014
- Recorded: 2014
- Genre: Dance-pop
- Length: 3:30
- Label: Sony
- Songwriters: Nasri Atweh; Adam Messinger; Nic Martin; Nolan Lambroza; Solo Tohi; Lukas Bellesini; John Pearce; Nic Martin; Nolan Lambroza

Justice Crew singles chronology
"I Am Australian" (2014)	"Que Sera" (2014)	"Where You From?" (2014)

Music video
- "Que Sera" (Australian version) on YouTube

Music video
- "Que Sera" (International version) on YouTube

"Que Sera" is a song recorded by Australian dance-pop group Justice Crew. It was released digitally on 2 May 2014 and physically in Australia on 16 May 2014, as the fourth single from their debut studio album Live by the Words. It was brought forward a week from its original release date of 9 May 2014 due to a high-profile TV sync on the My Kitchen Rules final and a live performance of the track on Sunrise on 5 May 2014. The song was also played during the 2015 Cricket World Cup when Kane Williamson got out in the semi-final of New Zealand vs South Africa.

== Background and release ==
The song was announced as Justice Crew's new single whilst on their national #HypeTour and was available for pre-order from 17 April 2014 along with a 30-second sample through YouTube. Exploring themes such as friendship, harmony, reflection and an appreciation of life, with the clear connection to the well known saying "what will be, will be", the song enables listeners to draw parallels with their own life experiences as well as further understand Justice Crew's journey thus far.

== Reception ==
For the week commencing 12 May 2014, "Que Sera" debuted at number one on the ARIA Singles Chart. It remained atop the chart for nine consecutive weeks, previously making it the longest-running number-one single by an Australian act since the ARIA Charts began in 1988, until the record was broken in 2019 by Tones and I with her song "Dance Monkey", which spent 10 weeks at the top. The song was certified five times platinum by the Australian Recording Industry Association for selling over 350,000 copies.

"Que Sera" received two nominations at the 2014 ARIA Music Awards for Song of the Year and Best Pop Release.

== Music videos ==
The first music video for "Que Sera" was directed by Lawrence Lim and premiered on Justice Crew's Vevo account on 12 May 2014. The video features the group singing and dancing in front of different coloured backdrops. It received a nomination at the 2014 ARIA Music Awards of 2014 for Best Video. A second music video for the US market was filmed in Los Angeles and premiered on 28 July 2014. Christine Sams of The Daily Telegraph noted that the video "starts with a helicopter and sweeping views of what appears to be Los Angeles, before the band members show off their smooth makeovers in sharp black suits and sunglasses — and then in matching cream, pastel blues and whites." Sams felt that the video was reminiscent of Backstreet Boys, Boyz II Men and New Kids on the Block.

== Cover versions ==
On 5 October 2014, Australian country music boy band Brothers3 covered "Que Sera" during the ninth live show of the sixth season of The X Factor Australia. Brothers3's version was released on the iTunes Store the following day, and debuted at number 42 on the ARIA Singles Chart.

Australian children's music group The Wiggles has also performed the song as part of their live shows.

== Track listing ==
- Digital download
1. Que Sera
2. Que Sera (Australian Version)
- CD single
1. Que Sera
2. Que Sera (Karaoke version)

== Charts ==
=== Weekly charts ===
Chart (2014)	Peak position
Australia (ARIA)	1
New Zealand (Recorded Music NZ)	14

=== Year-end charts ===
Chart (2014)	Rank
Australian Singles Chart	5
Australian Artist Singles Chart	2

== Certifications ==
Region	Certification	Certified units/sales
Australia (ARIA)	5× Platinum	350,000^{^}
New Zealand (RMNZ)	Platinum	15,000^{*}
^{*} Sales figures based on certification alone.^{^} Shipments figures based on certification alone.

== Release history ==
Region	Date	Format	Label
Australia	2 May 2014	Digital download	Sony Music Australia
Australia	16 May 2014	CD single	Sony Music Australia
United Kingdom	5 May 2014	Digital download	Sony Music Australia

== See also ==
- List of number-one singles of 2014 (Australia)
- List of Australian chart achievements and milestones
