= Everybody (Justice Crew song) =

Single by Justice Crew

from the album Live by the Words
- Released: 11 October 2013
- Recorded: 2013
- Genre: Dance-pop
- Length: 3:51
- Label: Sony
- Songwriters: Justice Crew; Danny Mercer; Jackson Morgan
- Producer: Deorro

Justice Crew singles chronology
"Best Night" (2012)	"Everybody" (2013)	"I Am Australian" (2014)

"Everybody" is a song recorded by Australian dance-pop group Justice Crew, released digitally and physically in Australia on 11 October 2013, as the group's eighth overall single and the third single from their debut studio album Live by the Words (2014). It peaked at number six on the ARIA Singles Chart and was certified two times platinum by the Australian Recording Industry Association, denoting sales of 140,000 copies.

== Background and production ==
"Everybody" was written in Los Angeles by Justice Crew, Danny Mercer and Jackson Morgan, whilst Justice Crew was on tour with Pitbull and Kesha for their North American Tour. The track was produced by Deorro, mixed by Miles Walker, and mastered by Tom Coyne. In a statement released on Justice Crew's official website, group member Eman said, "While on the road in the US we were playing around with lyrics and melodies, we heard this bass line and knew we had to make it ours. 'Everybody' is definitely a track you can dance to especially with the lyrics encouraging everybody to let the good times flow." "Everybody" was made available for digital and CD purchase on 11 October 2013. The CD contains a Jump Smokers remix and a karaoke mix. These mixes were released digitally on 13 December 2013.

== Commercial performance ==
"Everybody" debuted at number 15 on the ARIA Singles Chart on 21 October 2013. It reached its peak of number six on 18 November 2013, its fifth week on the chart. The song spent six consecutive weeks in the top ten, and was certified two times platinum by the Australian Recording Industry Association for selling 140,000 copies. In New Zealand, "Everybody" debuted at number 35 on 2 December 2013, and peaked at number 25 the following week.

== Promotion ==
The music video for "Everybody" was directed by Soup Kitchen Films and uploaded onto Justice Crew's official YouTube account on 10 October 2013. It was made available for purchase on the iTunes Store the next day. The video shows Justice Crew partying at a club and dancing in various locations such as a warehouse, a kitchen, an industrial estate, a graffiti subway and a bandstand at Moore Park, New South Wales. Justice Crew performed "Everybody" on Dancing with the Stars Australia, Sunrise, The Morning Show, and Today.

== Track listing ==
- Digital download
1. "Everybody" – 3:51
2. "Everybody" (Jump Smokers Remix) – 4:07
3. "Everybody" (Karaoke Mix) – 3:47
- CD single
1. "Everybody" – 3:51
2. "Everybody" (Jump Smokers Remix) – 4:07
3. "Everybody" (Karaoke Mix) – 3:47

== Charts ==
=== Weekly charts ===
Chart (2013)	Peak Position
Australia (ARIA)	6
New Zealand (Recorded Music NZ)	25
South Korea International Chart (Gaon)	18

=== Year-end charts ===
Chart (2013)	Rank
ARIA Singles Chart	58
Australian Artist Singles Chart	7

=== Year-end chart ===
Chart (2014)	Rank
Australian Artist Singles Chart	43

== Certifications ==
Region	Certification	Certified units/sales
Australia (ARIA)	2× Platinum	140,000^{^}
New Zealand (RMNZ)	Gold	7,500^{*}
^{*} Sales figures based on certification alone.^{^} Shipments figures based on certification alone.

== Release history ==
Region	Date	Format	Label
Australia	11 October 2013	CD single, digital download	Sony Music Australia
New Zealand	11 October 2013	CD single, digital download	Sony Music Australia
