= Beau Ryan =

Former Australian rugby league footballer

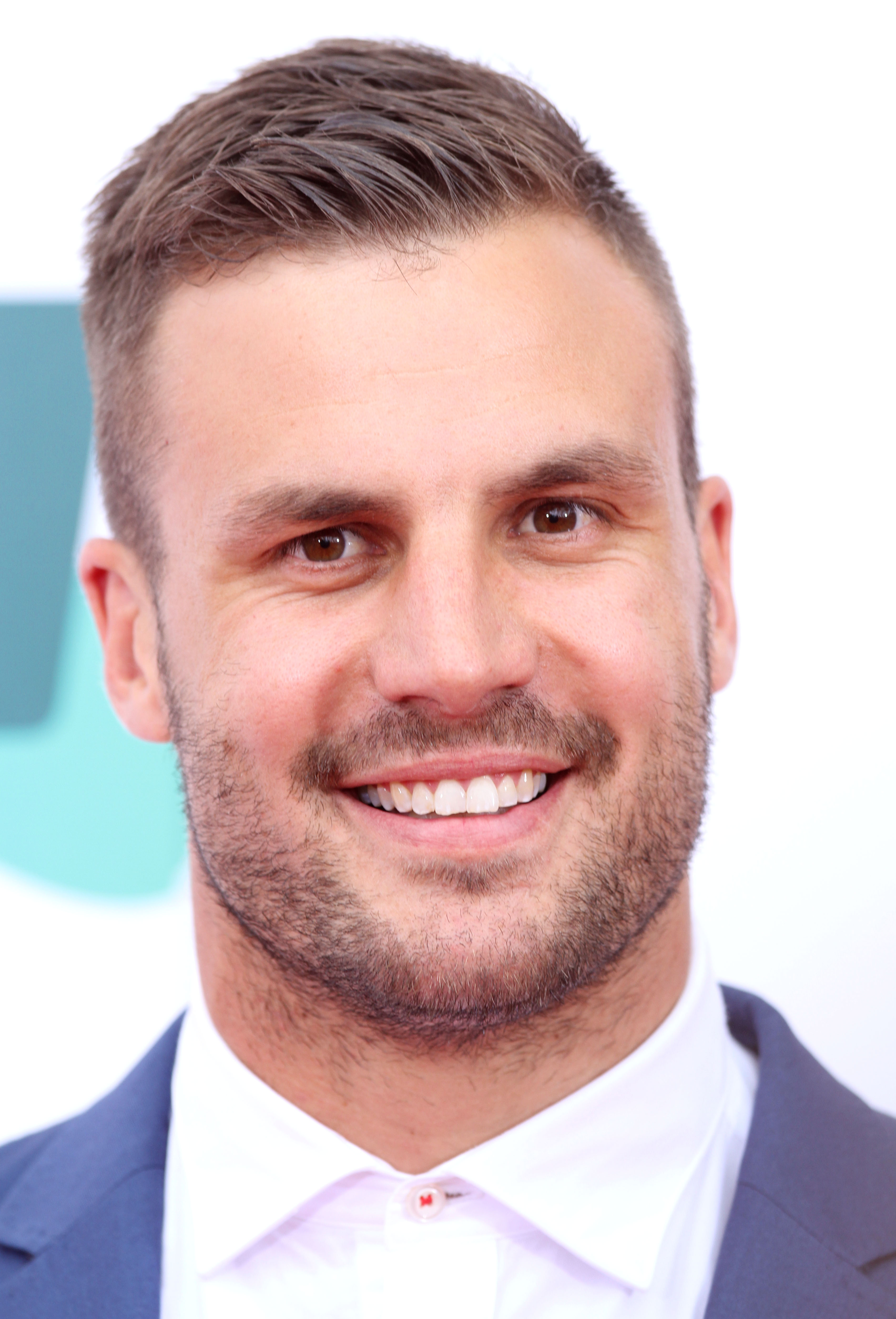
- Ryan in November 2014
- Born: 11 May 1985 (age 41); Wollongong, New South Wales, Australia
- Occupations: Rugby league footballer; television presenter; radio presenter; actor; singer
- Years active: 2007–present
- Employer: Network 10
- Television: The Footy Show; The Amazing Race Australia
- Spouse: Kara Orwell (m. 2012)
- Children: 2
- Rugby league career

Playing information
- Height: 182 cm (6 ft 0 in)
- Weight: 89 kg (14 st 0 lb)
- Position: Wing, Fullback, Centre
Club
Years	Team	Pld	T	G	FG	P
2007–12	Wests Tigers	104	46	0	0	184
2013–14	Cronulla Sharks	22	7	0	0	28
	Total	126	53	0	0	212
Representative
Years	Team	Pld	T	G	FG	P
2012	Prime Minister's XIII	1	1	0	0	4

Beau Ryan (born 11 May 1985) is an Australian television and radio presenter and former professional rugby league footballer. He played for the Wests Tigers and Cronulla-Sutherland Sharks in the National Rugby League as a winger, centre and fullback. Ryan is also known for his comedic work on The Footy Show. On 5 June 2014, Ryan announced his immediate retirement whilst on The Footy Show, due to a neck injury. Ryan released a single, "Where You From?" featuring Justice Crew on 19 September 2014.

Ryan is the host of Network 10's reality series The Amazing Race Australia and a co-host of Triple M Sydney's breakfast show with Natarsha Belling and Aaron Woods.

== Early career ==
Ryan is of distant Irish heritage and was raised in Albion Park. He played junior football with Wests Illawarra. In 2003, Ryan was selected to represent in the New South Wales Schoolboys team. In 2005 he won the Jersey Flegg Cup with the St. George Illawarra Dragons team under coach Steve Price, but left the club as he was behind centres Matt Cooper, Mark Gasnier and Wes Naiqama.

== Sporting career ==
=== Wests Tigers ===
Ryan joined the Wests Tigers and made his debut in round 16 of the 2007 NRL season. He played a further two games that year, scoring a try in his second appearance. The next season, he played in 15 games.

From 2009 onwards, Ryan was a regular winger for the Wests Tigers. He scored a personal best 13 tries that year, including seven tries in the last 4 games. Soon after, Ryan signed a contract to remain with the Tigers until the end of the 2012 season.

Injury hampered Ryan's season in 2011, and he didn't take his regular position on the wing until round 14. Ryan started the 2012 season by scoring 4 tries in his first 3 games. Later in the season he played games in the centres and at fullback (two after late withdrawals by Tim Moltzen), and it was said, "many good judges rate him the most improved player in the game." He was one of the few players to play in all 24 games for the club in 2012, scoring 9 tries. He made 310 runs during the year, among the NRLs top twenty performers, and was named in the Prime Minister's XIII at the end of the regular season.

Having previously announced a contract extension on The Footy Show, Ryan later signed a three-year contract with the Cronulla Sharks. Ryan said, "I agreed to a three-year deal but never received any formal documentation...I never got the opportunity to sign anything."

=== Cronulla-Sutherland Sharks ===
Ryan started playing for the Cronulla-Sutherland Sharks in the 2013 NRL season, during which the club was being investigated by ASADA. In the finals for this season, he scored a controversial 7th tackle try against the North Queensland Cowboys, which decided the match and knocked the Cowboys out of the competition.

On 5 June 2014, Ryan announced his immediate retirement from rugby league on The NRL Footy Show, due to an ongoing neck injury.

== Music career ==
Ryan released his debut single titled "Where You From?" featuring Justice Crew on 19 September 2014. It was released through Sony Music Australia. It debuted at number 19 on the ARIA Singles Chart.

== Media career ==
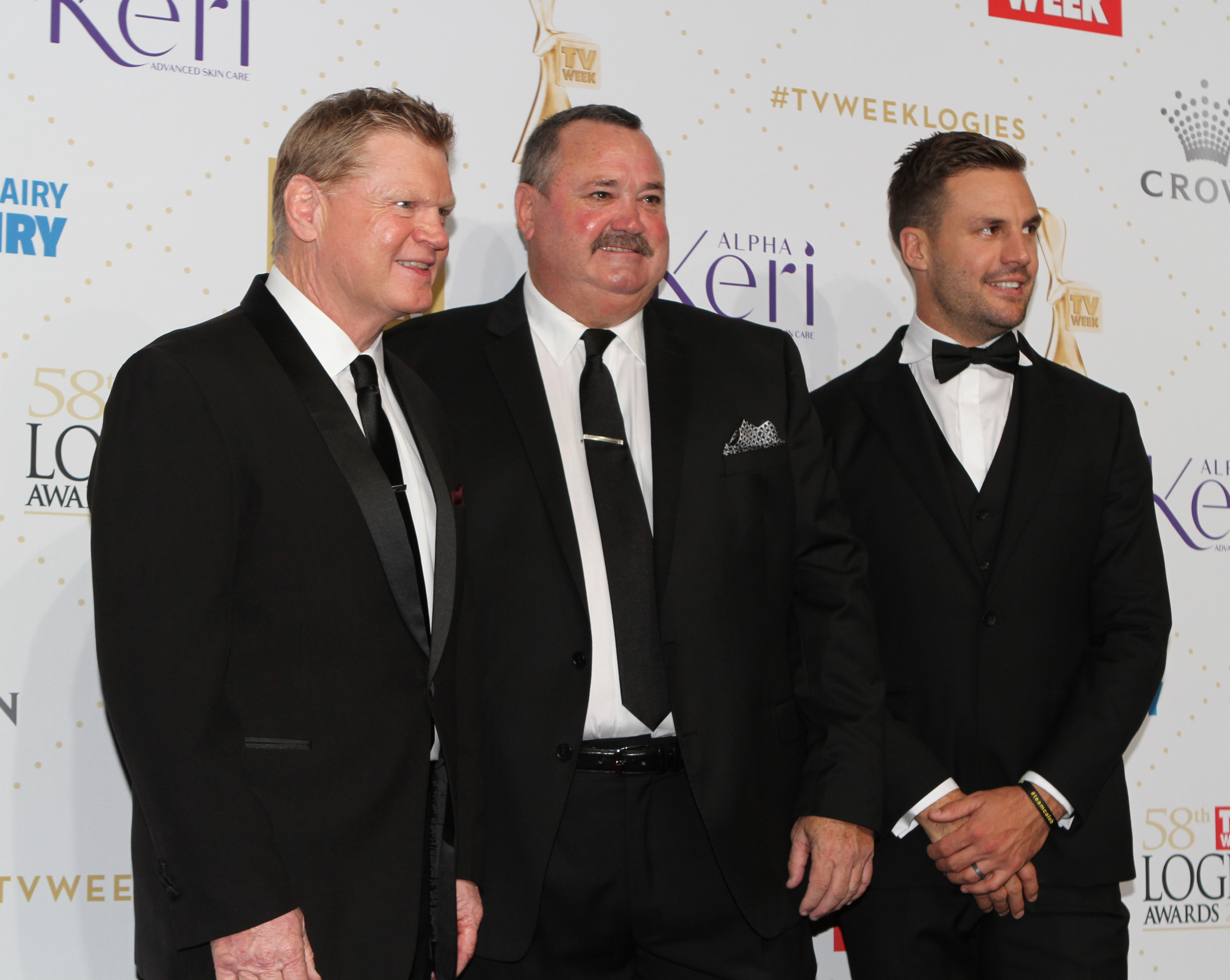
Ryan (right) at the 2016 TV Week Logie Awards

From 2009, Ryan began making regular "comedic" appearances on The Footy Show, and in 2010 started his own "comedy" segment, "Beau Knows...". He created two popular characters; DJ Yallah, an Egyptian-Australian DJ from Bankstown and Donnie Palmer, a Titans trainer who is obsessed with doing stretches. Other material included sketches mocking fellow NRL players.

Former coach Tim Sheens said of Ryan's television appearances, "Some players play golf on their day off. He goes and has some fun doing some television. At the moment, TV is his interest and good luck to him as long as it doesn't overtake his football." Ryan continued on The Footy Show, with a larger role in 2012.

In 2014, Ryan began a feud with then NRL player Jamie Soward after Ryan mocked Soward on The Footy Show. Soward was reportedly angry that Ryan had made fun of his voice and the way that he talked as the player has a lisp. Ryan said “It's all light-hearted stuff and I didn't mean to hurt anyone, and if I have hurt anyone I'll stop it".

In early June 2016, Ryan was involved in controversial segment on The Footy Show which viewers deemed "racist" and "abhorrent". The Nine Network issued an apology for the segment.

Ryan has advertising contracts for several clothing lines.

In 2019, Ryan was announced as the host of Network 10's revival of The Amazing Race Australia, replacing Grant Bowler, who hosted the earlier Seven Network iteration of the show.

In January 2022, Ryan appeared as a contestant on the eighth season of Network 10's I'm a Celebrity...Get Me Out of Here! Australia. He was the second celebrity to leave the jungle, withdrawing from the series on day 14.

In October 2023, it was announced that Ryan would host Network 10's revival of the sports entertainment competition show Gladiators Australia, alongside Liz Ellis. From 2025, Ryan has co-hosted Triple M Sydney's breakfast show with Aaron Woods and Natarsha Belling. Ryan was announced as a host of Network 10's revival of Australian Ninja Warrior on 19 July 2026, presenting alongside Robert Irwin and Georgie Tunny.

List of television roles
Year	Title	Role	Notes	Category
2009–2014	The Footy Show	Himself	Regular Guest	Television
2014–2018	The Footy Show	Himself	Co-host	Television
2018	Chasing Comets	Tom	Cast Member	Film
2019–	The Amazing Race Australia	Himself	Host	Television
	Studio 10	Himself	Co-host	Television
2022	I'm a Celebrity...Get Me Out of Here!	Himself	Contestant	Television
2024-	Top Gear Australia	Himself	Co-host	Television
2024	Gladiators Australia	Himself	Co-host	Television

== Personal life ==
Ryan and longtime partner, Kara Orrell announced to Woman's Day they were expecting their first child and engaged to be married in August 2012. The couple married on 14 October 2012, and Kara gave birth to their daughter Remi in January 2013. Their son Jesse was born July 2017.

In September 2015, a story appeared in a magazine that Ryan had been involved in an affair with former Hi-5 singer Lauren Brant. Brant's fiancé at the time stated that she admitted to the relationship while she and Ryan were appearing together in a Sydney Theatre production. Ryan took leave from The Footy Show to spend time with his family with a Nine Network source saying he had issues he was dealing with. He was removed by Woolworths as the face of an advertising campaign. Ryan returned to The Footy Show in October and neither denied nor admitted to the alleged affair but apologised to people who had been hurt. In an interview in 2016, he admitted knowing his wife was hurt and that he was embarrassed.

== Discography ==
Single, with selected chart position
Year	Title	Peak chart positions
Year	Title	AUS
2014	"Where You From?" (featuring Justice Crew)	19
