= My Kitchen Rules series 5 =

My Kitchen Rules
- Series 5
- No. of episodes: 48

Release
- Original network: Seven Network
- Original release: 27 January – 29 April 2014

Series chronology
- ← Previous; Series 4 (2013) Next → Series 6 (2015)

The fifth season of the Australian competitive cooking competition show My Kitchen Rules premiered on the Seven Network on 27 January 2014.

== Format changes ==
- The Food Truck — From the Top 12 to Top 9 rounds, teams were divided into two groups, cooking in a restaurant-like environment. Members of the public were served the dishes and paid for what they believed the meal was worth. The group that made the most money won the challenge whilst the losing group had to compete in a following cook-off to avoid elimination. The truck was run by chef, Colin Fassnidge.
- The Jury — From the Top 12 to Top 9 cook-off rounds, a jury was present and were able to save/send one of the competing teams to/from elimination. The jury was formed by the teams from the winning group of the Food Truck, and, if applicable, the People's Choice winner.
- People Choice Winners — A slight change of rules was used for this season due to the inclusion of the Food Truck. Unlike previous seasons, the winner did not always receive immunity from elimination. To ensure there were even teams for the Food Truck, some winners were given an advantage instead, such as being able to select the teams or ingredients. This was applicable to People's Choice challenges 2 & 4.
- Ultimate Instant Restaurant — The Top 5 teams headed back home to compete in an Ultimate Instant Restaurant round. They had to prepare two dishes for each course, with guest teams having the choice of which dish they wanted to order.

== Teams ==
State		Group	Members	Relationship	Status
South Australia	SA	2	Bree May & Jessica Liebich	Proud Mums	Winners 29 April (Grand Final)
Western Australia	WA	1	Chloe James & Kelly Ramsay	Well Travelled Friends	Runners-Up 29 April (Grand Final)
Victoria	VIC	1	Helena & Vikki Moursellas	Twins	Eliminated 28 April (Semi-Final 2)
Queensland	QLD	1	Paul Bullpitt & Blair Tonkin	Surfer Dads	Eliminated 27 April (Semi-Final 1)
Tasmania	TAS	2	Thalia Papadakis & Bianca Johnston	Besties	Eliminated 23 April (Top 5: Ultimate Instant Restaurant)
New South Wales	NSW	G	Cathy & Anna Lisle	Mother and Daughter	Eliminated 7 April (Top 7: Group 2)
Victoria	VIC	G	Josh Geard & Danielle Najda	Experimental Foodies	Eliminated 2 April (Top 7: Group 1)
New South Wales	NSW	G	Carly & Tresne Hart	Teacher and Estate Agent	Eliminated 31 March (Top 8)
New South Wales	NSW	2	Uel & Shannelle Lim	Newlyweds	Eliminated 25 March (Top 9)
Victoria	VIC	2	Harry Curtis & Christo Gibson	Best Mates	Eliminated 18 March (Top 10)
New South Wales	NSW	1	Annie & Jason Chesworth	Married Cheesemakers	Eliminated 11 March (Top 11)
South Australia	SA	1	Deb & Rick Payne	Married 38 Years	Eliminated 4 March (Top 12)
Queensland	QLD	2	David Kirk & Corinne Wieland	Couple Two Years	Eliminated 25 February (Instant Restaurant: Round 3)
Western Australia	WA	2	Jess Anderson & Felix Kemmer	Designer and Miner	Eliminated 16 February (Instant Restaurant: Round 2)
Australian Capital Territory	ACT	1	Andrew Hinge & Emelia Vimalasiri	Newly Dating	Eliminated 4 February (Instant Restaurant: Round 1)

== Elimination history ==
Teams' Competition Progress
Round:	Instant Restaurants			Top 12	Top 11	Top 10	Top 9	Top 8	Top 7			Top 5	Semi-Finals		Grand Final
Round:	1	2	3	Top 12	Top 11	Top 10	Top 9	Top 8	PC	Grp 1	Grp 2	UIR	1	2	Grand Final
Team	Progress														
Bree & Jessica	—N/a	1st (90)	—N/a	Judges’ Choice	FT (Safe)	FT (Safe)	HQ (Safe)	SD (39)	→ (Grp 2)	—N/a	SD (51)	3rd (63)	—N/a	1st (52)	Winners (54)
Chloe & Kelly	5th (49)	—N/a	3rd (68)	FT (Safe)	HQ (Safe)	HQ (Safe)	Builders’ Choice	HQ (Safe)	—N/a^{2} (Grp 1)	Safe	—N/a	4th (59)	1st (47)	—N/a	Runners-up (52)
Helena & Vikki	1st (95)	—N/a	—N/a	HQ (Safe)	HQ (Safe)	SD (40)	Judges’ Choice	HQ (Safe)	→ (Grp 1)	SD (39)	—N/a	2nd (65)	—N/a	2nd (42)	Eliminated (Episode 47)
Paul & Blair	3rd (79)	—N/a	—N/a	People's Choice	Judges’ Choice	FT (Safe)	Jury's; Choice	People's Choice	Win	Immune		1st (70)	2nd (46)	Eliminated (Episode 46)	
Thalia & Bianca	—N/a	2nd (85)	—N/a	Jury's; Choice	FT (Safe)	FT (Safe)	FT (Safe)	HQ (Safe)	→ (Grp 2)	—N/a	Safe	5th (58)	Eliminated (Episode 45)		
Cathy & Anna	—N/a		1st (89)	FT (Safe)	Jury's; Choice	People's Choice	FT (Safe)	HQ (Safe)	→ (Grp 2)	—N/a	SD (50)	Eliminated (Episode 40)			
Josh & Danielle	—N/a		5th (51)	FT (Safe)	FT (Safe)	Judges’ Choice ^{1}	SD (45)	HQ (Safe)	→ (Grp 1)	SD (35)	Eliminated (Episode 39)				
Carly & Tresne	—N/a		2nd (74)	FT (Safe)	SD (39)	Jury's; Choice^{1}	FT (Safe)	SD (38)	Eliminated (Episode 37)						
Uel & Shannelle	—N/a	3rd (53)	—N/a	SD (41)	Children's Choice	FT (Safe)	SD (43)	Eliminated (Episode 34)							
Harry & Christo	—N/a	5th (44)	4th (65)	HQ (Safe)	FT (Safe)	SD (33)	Eliminated (Episode 30)								
Annie & Jason	2nd (82)	—N/a	—N/a	FT (Safe)	SD (37)	Eliminated (Episode 26)									
Deb and Rick	4th (69)	—N/a	—N/a	SD (35)	Eliminated (Episode 22)										
David & Corinne	—N/a	4th (46)	6th (27)	Eliminated (Episode 18)											
Jess & Felix	—N/a	6th (43)	Eliminated (Episode 12)												
Andrew & Emelia	6th (47)	Eliminated (Episode 6)													

Cell Descriptions
→	Team passed the challenge and will continue to the next challenge.^2 (DNP: Due to family matters, Chloe and Kelly did not participate in this challenge)
	Team won the challenge or round (e.g. People's Choice).
	Team had to cook another round of Instant Restaurant
Safe	Team became safe from elimination after winning/passing a challenge. HQ: Kitchen Headquarter Challenge (R.Cook-off or Showdown); FT: Food Truck Challenge
Judges’ Choice	Team was made safe from elimination from being selected by the judges. (Rapid Cook-Off only)^1 (Note: In this cook-off, the judges sent the weakest team to the Showdown instead, thus saving this team)
Jury's; Choice	Team was made safe from elimination from being selected by the teams' jury. (Rapid Cook-Off only)^1 (Note: In this cook-off, the jury were asked to send the weakest team to the Showdown, thus saving this team)
SD	Team won the Sudden Death cook-off is safe from elimination.
SD	Team was eliminated after losing the Sudden Death cook-off or round.
Immune	From winning the previous challenge, team was immune from elimination and was not required to participate.
—N/a	Results do not apply as the team was not allocated to this challenge or round.

== Competition details ==
=== Instant Restaurants ===
During the Instant Restaurant rounds, each team hosts a three-course dinner for judges and fellow teams in their allocated group. They are scored and ranked among their group, with the lowest scoring team being eliminated.

==== Round 1 ====
- Episodes 1 to 6
- Airdate — 27 January to 4 February
- Description — The first of the two instant restaurant groups are introduced into the competition in Round 1. The lowest scoring team at the end of this round is eliminated.

Instant Restaurant Summary
Group 1
Team and Episode Details		Guest Scores						Pete's Scores			Manu's Scores			Total (out of 110)	Rank	Result
Team and Episode Details		A&J	A&E	P&B	H&V	D&R	C&K	Entrée	Main	Dessert	Entrée	Main	Dessert	Total (out of 110)	Rank	Result
NSW	Annie & Jason	—	7	7	7	6	7	8	9	8	7	9	7	82	2nd	Safe
Ep 1	27 January	The Milk Barn														Safe
Dishes	Entree	Goats Cheese Croquettes with Rocket & Apple Salad														Safe
Dishes	Main	Fillet Steak with Sweet Potato Purée														Safe
Dishes	Dessert	Raspberry & White Chocolate Cheesecake with Chocolate Shards														Safe
ACT	Andrew & Emelia	4	—	5	4	3	4	3	4	7	1	5	7	47	6th	Eliminated
Ep 2	28 January	Berralicious														Eliminated
Dishes	Entree	Shrimp in a Barrel														Eliminated
Dishes	Main	Gourmet Gumbo														Eliminated
Dishes	Dessert	Chocolate Cherry Tart with Kirsch Cream														Eliminated
QLD	Paul & Blair	6	7	—	7	6	8	10	6	7	9	7	6	79	3rd	Safe
Ep 3	29 January	Swell														Safe
Dishes	Entree	Salt and Pepper Quail with Lemon Pepper Dipping Sauce														Safe
Dishes	Main	Spicy Indonesian Chicken Curry														Safe
Dishes	Dessert	Rum Chocolate Pots with Salted Caramel Toffee														Safe
VIC	Helena & Vikki	8	8	8	—	9	8	10	9	10	10	6	9	95	1st	Safe
Ep 4	2 February	Didima														Safe
Dishes	Entree	Squid Wraps with Tomato Salad														Safe
Dishes	Main	Hapuku with Black Olive Sauce														Safe
Dishes	Dessert	Orange and Clove Semolina Cake with Spiced Mascarpone														Safe
SA	Deb and Rick	5	5	6	7	—	5	5	7	8	5	8	8	69	4th	Safe
Ep 5	3 February	Deb and Rick's														Safe
Dishes	Entree	Prawn, Fennel & Potato Crisp with Mustard Dressing														Safe
Dishes	Main	Pesto Filled Ocean Trout with Potato Mash														Safe
Dishes	Dessert	Deb's Trifle														Safe
WA	Chloe & Kelly	5	3	5	2	3	—	3	9	2	5	8	4	49	5th	Through to Round 3
Ep 6	4 February	Nouveau														Through to Round 3
Dishes	Entree	Trio of Cheese														Through to Round 3
Dishes	Main	Peasants Paella with Rabbit and Snails														Through to Round 3
Dishes	Dessert	Millefeuille with Passion Fruit Custard and Lime Tequila Curd														Through to Round 3

==== Round 2 ====
- Episodes 7 to 12
- Airdate — 5 February to 16 February
- Description — The second group now start their Instant Restaurant round. The same rules from the previous round apply and the lowest scoring team is eliminated.

Instant Restaurant Summary
Group 2
Team and Episode Details		Guest Scores						Pete's Scores			Manu's Scores			Total (out of 110)	Rank	Result
Team and Episode Details		U&S	D&C	T&B	H&C	B&J	J&F	Entrée	Main	Dessert	Entrée	Main	Dessert	Total (out of 110)	Rank	Result
NSW	Uel & Shannelle	—	4	5	5	6	5	5	6	3	5	6	3	53	3rd	Safe
Ep 7	5 February	Hand in Hand														Safe
Dishes	Entree	Grilled Lobster with Pumpkin Dipping Soup and Pancetta Crisp														Safe
Dishes	Main	Lamb Shank Pie with Pea Mash														Safe
Dishes	Dessert	S'mores Pie														Safe
QLD	David & Corinne	4	—	4	3	3	2	5	4	3	5	4	4	46	4th	Through to Round 3
Ep 8	9 February	The Quarter Deck														Through to Round 3
Dishes	Entree	Crayfish Stack with Lime Mayonnaise														Through to Round 3
Dishes	Main	Mud Crab Angel Hair Pasta														Through to Round 3
Dishes	Dessert	Tropical Eton Mess with Spun Sugar														Through to Round 3
TAS	Thalia & Bianca	8	8	—	8	8	7	10	7	7	10	6	6	85	2nd	Safe
Ep 9	10 February	The Market Kitchen														Safe
Dishes	Entree	Grandma's Brandy Pâté with Homemade Brioche and Chutney														Safe
Dishes	Main	Fish and Chips														Safe
Dishes	Dessert	Bombe Alaska														Safe
VIC	Harry & Christo	5	2	6	—	5	3	7	2	2	7	2	3	44	5th	Through to Round 3
Ep 10	11 February	The Green House														Through to Round 3
Dishes	Entree	Caramelized Onion Tart														Through to Round 3
Dishes	Main	Prosciutto & Smoked Mozzarella Rolled Veal with Potato Croquettes														Through to Round 3
Dishes	Dessert	Blueberry and Frangipane Tart with Blueberry Ripple Ice-Cream														Through to Round 3
SA	Bree & Jessica	8	9	8	8	–	8	10	10	5	10	9	5	90	1st	Safe
Ep 11	12 February	Sage														Safe
Dishes	Entree	Scallops with Wilted Bitter Greens and Stilton Dressing														Safe
Dishes	Main	Salt Baked Chateaubriand with Chervil Béarnaise and Pommes Frites														Safe
Dishes	Dessert	Raspberry Mousse Cake with Macerated Berries and Sugar Crusted Almonds														Safe
WA	Jess & Felix	4	3	4	3	6	–	3	1	7	4	2	6	43	6th	Eliminated
Ep 12	16 February	Baroque Haus														Eliminated
Dishes	Entree	Pork Belly Two Ways														Eliminated
Dishes	Main	Confit of Duck Cigars with Cherry & Shiraz Sauce and Margaret River Brie														Eliminated
Dishes	Dessert	Mint Slice with Macadamia Praline														Eliminated

==== Round 3 (Gatecrasher Round) ====
- Episodes 13 to 18
- Airdate — 17 February to 25 February
- Description — In the third round of instant restaurants, the three lowest scoring safe teams in the first two groups combined, were to compete in another instant restaurant round. From here, three newly introduced 'gatecrasher' teams also joined the round. As per the first two rounds, the same format of scoring is repeated and the lowest scoring team is eliminated .

Instant Restaurant Summary
Round 3
Team and Episode Details		Guest Scores						Pete's Scores			Manu's Scores			Total (out of 110)	Rank	Result
Team and Episode Details		C&T	C&K	J&D	H&C	D&C	C&A	Entrée	Main	Dessert	Entrée	Main	Dessert	Total (out of 110)	Rank	Result
NSW	Carly & Tresne	—	7	7	7	6	5	7	9	5	7	8	6	74	2nd	Safe
Ep 13	17 February	Inspire														Safe
Dishes	Entree	Beetroot Tart with Goat's Cheese Mousse and Balsamic Reduction														Safe
Dishes	Main	Beef Fillet with Parsnip Purée, Beetroot & Red Wine Discs and Red Wine Jus														Safe
Dishes	Dessert	Caramel Divine														Safe
WA	Chloe & Kelly	7	—	5	5	4	6	10	6	5	10	6	4	68	3rd	Safe
Ep 14	18 February	Nouveau														Safe
Dishes	Entree	Poached Marron on Crab Pillow with Truffle Emulsion.														Safe
Dishes	Main	Chicken Confit with Brussels Sprouts, Speck and Mushroom Sauce														Safe
Dishes	Dessert	Cannoli with Chocolate and Orange Ricotta served with Espressotini														Safe
VIC	Josh & Danielle	7	4	—	4	3	5	3	5	5	5	5	5	51	5th	Safe
Ep 15	19 February	Alchemy														Safe
Dishes	Entree	Oxtail and Mushroom Gyoza with Hazelnut Oil, Grape Vinaigrette and Apple Sphere														Safe
Dishes	Main	Sous Vide Salmon with Cinnamon Biscuit, Vanilla Mayonnaise, Pea and Radish														Safe
Dishes	Dessert	Banana Parfait with Maple Syrup Bacon														Safe
VIC	Harry & Christo	6	6	4	—	5	6	4	7	8	3	8	8	65	4th	Safe
Ep 16	23 February	The Green House														Safe
Dishes	Entree	Calamari Sautéed in Capsicum & Garlic Infused Olive Oil with Seasonal Leaves														Safe
Dishes	Main	Roast Pheasant with Bread Sauce and Beetroot Salad														Safe
Dishes	Dessert	Baked Stone Fruit with Amaretti Crumble and Vanilla Bean Ice-Cream														Safe
QLD	David & Corinne	7	3	2	1	–	2	2	2	2	1	3	2	27	6th	Eliminated
Ep 17	24 February	The Quarter Deck														Eliminated
Dishes	Entree	Corn Soup with Avocado and Grilled Tiger Prawns														Eliminated
Dishes	Main	Pork Medallions with Cauliflower Purée, Green Beans and Mushroom Sauce														Eliminated
Dishes	Dessert	Chocolate Cake with Candied Liqueur Oranges														Eliminated
NSW	Cathy & Anna	8	8	8	7	8	–	9	7	10	9	6	10	89	1st	Safe
Ep 18	25 February	The Country Manor														Safe
Dishes	Entree	Seared Scotch Fillet with Eggplant Caviar, Fennel Chips, Baby Herbs and Homemade Aioli														Safe
Dishes	Main	Walcha Lamb Loin with Potato Galette, Beetroot, Asparagus and Orange & Mint Sauce														Safe
Dishes	Dessert	Petit Apple Lattice Pies with Spiced Crème Anglaise														Safe

=== Top 12 ===
==== People's Choice 1: Breakfast at Central ====
- Episode 19
- Airdate — 26 February 2014
- Location — Central railway station, Sydney
- Description — Teams must cook and serve a convenient, on-the-go breakfast for Sydney's commuters at Central Station. The public voted for their favourite dish, with the team receiving the most votes, safe from elimination. Pete and Manu decided on the weakest team to head into the first Sudden Death cook-off.

People's Choice Challenge 1
Team		Dish	Result
QLD	Paul & Blair	Cheesy Bacon and Egg Pie with Rocket Salad	People's Choice
NSW	Annie & Jason	Chorizo and Goat's Cheese Quesadillas with Guacamole	Through to Food Truck challenge
SA	Bree & Jessica	Congee with Chinese Sausage and Egg	Through to Food Truck challenge
NSW	Carly & Tresne	Pear and Raspberry Friand with Baked Pear	Through to Food Truck challenge
NSW	Cathy & Anna	Moist Banana Bread with Caramelised Banana and Honey Ricotta	Through to Food Truck challenge
WA	Chloe & Kelly	Mediterranean Baked Eggs with Crusty Bread and Feta Whip	Through to Food Truck challenge
SA	Deb & Rick	Ricotta and Potato Bake with Crispy Bacon and Relish	Through to Food Truck challenge
VIC	Harry & Christo	Trio of Toasties	Through to Food Truck challenge
VIC	Helena & Vikki	Breakfast Lamb Gözleme with Tzatziki	Through to Food Truck challenge
VIC	Josh & Danielle	62 Degree Eggs with Bacon Jam and Asparagus	Through to Food Truck challenge
TAS	Thalia & Bianca	Savoury Pancakes with Caramelised Onions and Chutney	Through to Food Truck challenge
NSW	Uel & Shannelle	Poached Salmon with 60/60 Eggs, Rice and Spices	Through to Sudden Death

==== Food Truck 1: Cronulla, NSW ====
- Episode 20
- Airdate — 2 March 2014
- Location — North Cronulla Beach, NSW
- Description — Teams are split into two groups (white aprons and black aprons) and must each run a restaurant for real paying customers. Each group consists of five teams and must cook an appetiser, two mains and two desserts. One team from each group is assigned as Head Chef and Maître d' and must make sure their group have their food orders ready and in line for service. The group that earns the most money is safe from elimination, while the losing group face a kitchen cook-off.

Food Truck 1
White Group		Menu		Result
VIC	Josh (Head Chef)	Appetiser	Seared Tuna Nicoise	Safe
VIC	Danielle (Maître d')	Appetiser	Seared Tuna Nicoise	Safe
NSW	Cathy & Anna	Main	Crispy Skin Ocean Trout with Lentils and Salsa Verde	Safe
WA	Chloe & Kelly	Main	Surf 'n' Turf: Eye Fillet with Prawns and Twice Cooked Chips	Safe
NSW	Annie & Jason	Dessert	Chocolate Ganache and Shortbread Stack	Safe
NSW	Carly & Tresne	Dessert	Deconstructed Lemon and Raspberry Tart	Safe
Black Group		Menu		Result
VIC	Helena (Head Chef)	Appetiser	Prawn Cocktail	Through to Kitchen cook-off
VIC	Vikki (Maître d')	Appetiser	Prawn Cocktail	Through to Kitchen cook-off
SA	Bree & Jessica	Main	Braised Pork Belly with White Bean Ragu and Salsa Verde	Through to Kitchen cook-off
SA	Deb & Rick	Main	Rack of Lamb with Roasted Cherry Tomatoes and Mint Sauce	Through to Kitchen cook-off
VIC	Harry & Christo	Dessert	Flourless Chocolate Torte with Macerated Berries	Through to Kitchen cook-off
TAS	Thalia & Bianca	Dessert	Lemon and Lime Citrus Meringue Crumble	Through to Kitchen cook-off

==== Kitchen Cook-off ====
- Episode 21
- Airdate — 3 March 2014
- Description — The Kitchen cook-off is divided into two parts.
  - Rapid cook-off: Meat & 3 Veg — Teams must create a 'Meat & 3 Veg' dish in 45 minutes. The selection of meat (pork, chicken, beef, duck or lamb) was determined by the bench they chose to stand at. Any three vegetables were able to be used. In a new twist, the remaining safe teams became The Jury and were able to save one of the teams through a blind tasting. A second team was saved by Pete and Manu.
  - Showdown: Family Favourites — The remaining three teams headed into the Showdown, where they were challenged to cook a family favourite meal in one hour. The weakest team from here heads into the Sudden Death cook-off against Uel & Shannelle.

Rapid cook-off
Team		Dish	Result
SA	Bree & Jessica	Beef Steak with Potato Mash, Sweet Potato Chips and Chimichurri Sauce	Safe (Judge's Choice)
TAS	Thalia & Bianca	Chicken Breast with Mushroom Purée, Baby Carrots and Asparagus	Safe (Jury's Choice)
SA	Deb & Rick	Crispy Skin Duck with Asian Style Vegetables	Through to Showdown
VIC	Harry & Christo	Greek Style Lamb with Zucchini Salad and Roast Potatoes	Through to Showdown
VIC	Helena & Vikki	Pork Cutlet with Fennel Salad and Crunchy Potatoes	Through to Showdown
Showdown
Team		Dish	Result
VIC	Harry & Christo	Chicken Schnitzel with Coleslaw, Sweet Potato Chips and Roasted Tomatoes	Safe
VIC	Helena & Vikki	Pork and Beef Meatballs with Fettuccine and Parmesan Wafers	Safe
SA	Deb & Rick	Caramelised Chicken with Jasmine Rice Salad and Chilli Coconut Dressing	Through to Sudden Death

==== Sudden Death ====
- Episode 22
- Airdate — 4 March 2014
- Description — The first Sudden Death cook-off for the series. Each team must produce a three-course menu for guest judges and Pete and Manu. Following its success from last year, blind tastings were re-introduced as the judging format. All judges score the entire menu out of 10 and the lower scoring team is eliminated.

Sudden Death cook-off results
Team		Judge's scores						Total (out of 60)	Result
Team		Karen	Guy	Liz	Colin	Pete	Manu	Total (out of 60)	Result
NSW	Uel & Shannelle	7	7	7	6	7	7	41	Safe
Dishes	Entree	Singaporean Chilli Soft Shell Crab							Safe
Dishes	Main	Braised Pork Belly with Quail Eggs and Asian Greens							Safe
Dishes	Dessert	Coconut Filled Pandan Crêpes							Safe
SA	Deb & Rick	6	6	5	5	7	6	35	Eliminated
Dishes	Entree	Prawn and Avocado Tart							Eliminated
Dishes	Main	Spiced Lamb Shanks with Green Beans and Sweet Potato and Carrot Purée							Eliminated
Dishes	Dessert	Sticky Date Pudding with Vanilla Ice Cream							Eliminated

=== Top 11 ===
==== People's Choice 2: School Lunch ====
- Episode 23
- Airdate — 5 March 2014
- Location — Bankstown Public School
- Description — For this challenge, teams headed back to primary school to create a healthy lunch for 200 kids. The students voted for their favourite lunch, with one team winning the Children's Choice. On the other end, Pete and Manu sent one team directly into the next Sudden Death cook-off. The Children's Choice winners will gain an advantage at the next Food Truck challenge.

People's Choice Challenge 2
Team		Dish	Result
NSW	Uel & Shannelle	Fish Fingers with Roast Potato Salad	Children's Choice
NSW	Annie & Jason	Chicken Nuggets with Sweet Potato Chips and Corn on the Cob	Through to Food Truck challenge
SA	Bree & Jessica	Potato Gnocchi with Cheesy Bolognese	Through to Food Truck challenge
NSW	Cathy & Anna	Beef and Apple Sausage Rolls with Fruit Skewers	Through to Food Truck challenge
WA	Chloe & Kelly	Turkey Nachos with Spelt Chips and BBQ Corn Salsa	Through to Food Truck challenge
VIC	Harry & Christo	Lamb Pita Pockets with Freckles	Through to Food Truck challenge
VIC	Helena & Vikki	Chicken Burgers with Spinach Balls	Through to Food Truck challenge
VIC	Josh & Danielle	Soft Shell Beef Tacos	Through to Food Truck challenge
QLD	Paul & Blair	Crunchy Snapper with Grilled Zucchini Fritters	Through to Food Truck challenge
TAS	Thalia & Bianca	Mini Cottage Pies with Sour Cream Pastry	Through to Food Truck challenge
NSW	Carly & Tresne	Pizza Pinwheels with Root Vegetable Chips	Through to Sudden Death

==== Food Truck 2: Melbourne, Vic ====
- Episode 24
- Airdate — 9 March 2014
- Location — Australian Centre for Contemporary Art, Southbank, Victoria
- Description — The Food Truck has arrived in Melbourne, where teams are once again, split into two groups and each running competing restaurants. As winners of the previous People's Choice challenge, Uel and Shannelle were able to handpick their group members and form the white group. The remaining teams were formed as the black group. In the end, the group that earned the least money is sent to the Kitchen cook-off to determine the next team going into Sudden Death.

Food Truck 2
White Group		Menu		Result
VIC	Christo (Head Chef)	Appetiser	Chilled Cucumber Soup with Scallop Ceviche	Safe
VIC	Harry (Maître d')	Appetiser	Chilled Cucumber Soup with Scallop Ceviche	Safe
VIC	Josh & Danielle	Main	Asian Spiced Sirloin with Umami Broth and Pak Choy	Safe
NSW	Uel & Shannelle	Main	Crispy Fried Chicken with Peanut Vermicelli Salad	Safe
SA	Bree & Jessica	Dessert	Sake Poached Pear with Ricotta Fritter and Zabaglione	Safe
TAS	Thalia & Bianca	Dessert	Orange Syrup Cake with Caramelised Pineapple and Crème Fraîche	Safe
Black Group		Menu		Result
QLD	Blair (Head Chef)	Appetiser	Beef Carpaccio with Celeriac Remoulade	Through to Kitchen cook-off
QLD	Paul (Maître d')	Appetiser	Beef Carpaccio with Celeriac Remoulade	Through to Kitchen cook-off
NSW	Annie & Jason	Main	Dukkah Crusted Salmon with Green Leaves and Roasted Beetroot	Through to Kitchen cook-off
WA	Chloe & Kelly	Main	Fillet of Lamb with Israeli Couscous and Persian Cigar	Through to Kitchen cook-off
NSW	Cathy & Anna	Dessert	Macadamia Tartlets with Caramelised Apple	Through to Kitchen cook-off
VIC	Helena & Vikki	Dessert	Lemon Curd Loukoumades with Honey Thyme Syrup	Through to Kitchen cook-off

==== Kitchen Cook-off ====
- Episode 25
- Airdate — 10 March 2014
- Description — Two cook-offs were held. Two teams selected by the judges and teams' jury were safe after the rapid cook-off. The remaining three teams headed into the following showdown. The lowest performing team from here heads into the Sudden Death cook-off.
  - Rapid cook-off: Fridge Favourites — Teams had to create a dish using ingredients from a stranger's fridge. Through Facebook, fans of the show shared their list of ingredients in their fridges and five of them were used in this challenge
  - Showdown: Judge's Ingredients — For this challenge, teams used ingredients that judges, Pete and Manu use in their own fridge. Each judge had two crates of the same ingredients on offer and contestants were able choose which judge's ingredients they wish to use. As there were only three teams, one of the judge's crates was not used.

Rapid cook-off
Team		Dish	Result
QLD	Paul & Blair	Crispy Skin Barramundi with Rocket Pesto, Peas, Asparagus and Bacon	Safe (Judge's Choice)
NSW	Cathy & Anna	Pork Cutlets with Balsamic Apples and Potato Mash	Safe (Jury's Choice)
NSW	Annie & Jason	Herb Crusted Lamb Rack with Vegetable and Halloumi Stack and Roasted Tomatoes	Through to Showdown
WA	Chloe & Kelly	Salmon with Potato Rösti and Asparagus and Radish Salad	Through to Showdown
VIC	Helena & Vikki	Chicken Roulade with Mushroom Sauce and Zucchini Salad	Through to Showdown
Showdown
Team		Dish	Result
WA	Chloe & Kelly	(Manu) Pan Seared Scallops with Cauliflower Purée and Crispy Bone Marrow	Safe
VIC	Helena & Vikki	(Pete) Baked Snapper with Prawns, Eggplant and Tomato Ragu and Skordalia Mash	Safe
NSW	Annie & Jason	(Manu) Crispy Skin Duck with Blood Orange Sauce, Glazed Carrots and Cauliflower Purée	Through to Sudden Death

==== Sudden Death ====
- Episode 26
- Airdate — 11 March 2014
- Description — Two NSW teams must compete in another Sudden Death cook-off, after their low performances during previous challenges. Both teams must serve a three course meal to Pete, Manu and guest judges for a blind tasting. The winner is safe and through to the Top 10. The lower scoring team is eliminated from the competition

Sudden Death cook-off results
Team		Judge's scores						Total (out of 60)	Result
Team		Karen	Guy	Liz	Colin	Pete	Manu	Total (out of 60)	Result
NSW	Carly & Tresne	7	6	6	6	7	7	39	Safe
Dishes	Entree	Prawn and Ricotta Stuffed Zucchini Flowers with Lime Mayonnaise							Safe
Dishes	Main	Beef Cheeks in Red Wine with Cheesy Polenta and Brussels Sprout Salad							Safe
Dishes	Dessert	Strawberry Shortcake Stack							Safe
NSW	Annie & Jason	6	6	6	5	7	7	37	Eliminated
Dishes	Entree	Twice Baked Gruyère Soufflé with Walnut, Pear and Rocket Salad							Eliminated
Dishes	Main	Beef Wellington with Potato Gratin and Red Wine Sauce							Eliminated
Dishes	Dessert	Crème Caramel with Spun Sugar and Edible Flowers							Eliminated

=== Top 10 ===
==== People's Choice 3: Italian Festival ====
- Episode 27
- Airdate — 12 March 2014
- Location — Norton Street, Leichhardt, NSW
- Description — Teams headed to Sydney's Norton Street in Leichhardt to serve Mediterranean meals for the annual Italian Festival. Teams had a total of 3 hours to shop at the local Italian grocers and market, cook and serve their meals to the festival-goers. The public voted for their favourite dish and the team with the most votes was safe from elimination. The judges sent the weakest team into the next Sudden Death cook-off.

People's Choice Challenge 3
Team		Dish	Result
NSW	Cathy & Anna	Fritto Misto with Anchovy Aioli and Fennel Salad	People's Choice
SA	Bree & Jessica	Orzo alla Marinara (Seafood and Barley Stew)	Through to Food Truck challenge
NSW	Carly & Tresne	Mushroom Arancini with Tomato Sauce and Caprese Salad	Through to Food Truck challenge
WA	Chloe & Kelly	Pizza with Pear, Pancetta and Rocket	Through to Food Truck challenge
VIC	Harry & Christo	Whitebait Fritters with Fennel and Radish Salad	Through to Food Truck challenge
VIC	Josh & Danielle	Ricotta Gnocchi with Napoletana Sauce	Through to Food Truck challenge
QLD	Paul & Blair	Veal Piadinas with Buffalo Mozzarella	Through to Food Truck challenge
TAS	Thalia & Bianca	Churros with Chilli Chocolate and Salted Caramel Sauce	Through to Food Truck challenge
NSW	Uel & Shannelle	Pork Belly with Salsa Verde and Watermelon Salad	Through to Food Truck challenge
VIC	Helena & Vikki	Prawn and Mushroom Polenta Balls	Through to Sudden Death

==== Food Truck 3: Parramatta, NSW ====
- Episode 28
- Airdate — 16 March 2014
- Location — Parramatta, NSW
- Description — The Food Truck has returned to Sydney, and the teams are once again split into two (white aprons vs. black aprons). This time, they are serving multicultural foods of multiple nationalities. Carly and Tresne were selected to be the White groups' Head chef and Maître d', while Uel and Shannelle were selected to be Head Chef and Maître d' for the black group. The group that made the most money is safe and the group that makes the least is sent to Kitchen cook-off to determine the next team going into sudden death.

Food Truck 3
Black Group		Menu		Result
NSW	Shannelle (Head Chef)	Appetiser	Spiced Gazpacho with Pink Ling	Safe
NSW	Uel (Maître d')	Appetiser	Spiced Gazpacho with Pink Ling	Safe
SA	Bree & Jessica	Main	Pan Seared Swordfish with Green Curry and Vietnamese Salad	Safe
TAS	Thalia & Bianca	Main	Middle Eastern Lamb with Smoky Baba Ganoush and Flatbread	Safe
QLD	Paul & Blair	Dessert	Ginger Cake with Caramelised Peaches and Spiced Syrup	Safe
White Group		Menu		Result
NSW	Tresne (Head Chef)	Appetiser	Twisted Chicken Caesar Salad	Through to Kitchen cook-off
NSW	Carly (Maître d')	Appetiser	Twisted Chicken Caesar Salad	Through to Kitchen cook-off
WA	Chloe & Kelly	Main	Open Crab Lasagne with Pea Purée and Sage Burnt Butter Sauce	Through to Kitchen cook-off
VIC	Harry & Christo	Main	Angus Beef Burgers with Chips	Through to Kitchen cook-off
VIC	Josh & Danielle	Dessert	Fried Apple Pie with Salted Caramel	Through to Kitchen cook-off

==== Kitchen Cook-off ====
- Episode 29
- Airdate — 17 March 2014
- Description — Chicken or Egg

For the rapid cook-off, teams had 45 minutes to cook either a chicken or egg dish. Two teams cooked with chicken and the other two with eggs. In a special twist the two chicken dishes competed against each other and the same for the two egg dishes. The jury and the judges sent the worst chicken and egg team through to the Showdown. In the Showdown, the two teams will cook another dish with chicken or egg using the opposite ingredient from the previous cook-off.

Rapid cook-off
Team		Dish		Result
NSW	Carly & Tresne	Egg	Thai Egg Nets with Pork and Prawn	Safe
WA	Chloe & Kelly	Egg	Middle Eastern Quail Eggs with Couscous	Through to Showdown (Sent by Jury)
VIC	Josh & Danielle	Chicken	Chicken Two Ways with Asian Slaw	Safe
VIC	Harry & Christo	Chicken	Chicken Laksa	Through to Showdown (Sent by Judges)
Showdown
Team		Dish		Result
WA	Chloe & Kelly	Japanese Inspired Poached Chicken in a Mushroom Broth with Crispy Chicken Skin		Safe
VIC	Harry & Christo	Tortilla Española with Brava Sauce and Chorizo		Through to Sudden Death

==== Sudden Death ====
- Episode 30
- Airdate — 18 March 2014
- Description — Two Victorian teams, the twins, Helena and Vikki and the boys, Harry and Christo competed in a Sudden Death cook-off after their low performances at previous challenges. Both teams must cook their best three course meal for host and guest judges for scoring. The twins brought upon their Greek heritage, cooking dishes inspired by their grandmother, whilst the boys took a more casual approach, dishing up their favourite meals as mates. The lower scoring team is eliminated as the winning team advances to the Top 9.

Sudden Death cook-off results
Team		Judge's scores						Total (out of 60)	Result
Team		Karen	Guy	Liz	Colin	Pete	Manu	Total (out of 60)	Result
VIC	Helena & Vikki	6	7	7	6	7	7	40	Safe
Dishes	Entree	Mussels Saganaki with Dill Pita Bread							Safe
Dishes	Main	Baked Moussaka with Greek Salad							Safe
Dishes	Dessert	Raspberry and Banana Cake with Sweet Dukkah and Citrus Curd							Safe
VIC	Harry & Christo	6	5	6	4	6	6	33	Eliminated
Dishes	Entree	Tuna Carpaccio with Citrus and Soy Dressing							Eliminated
Dishes	Main	Wagyu Beef with Bearnaise Sauce and Truffle Chips							Eliminated
Dishes	Dessert	Espresso Crème Brûlée							Eliminated

=== Top 9 ===
==== People's Choice 4: Builder's Site BBQ ====
- Episode 31
- Airdate — 19 March 2014
- Location — Central Park, Sydney
- Description — Teams headed into the Central Park development worksite to cook a barbecue lunch for 200 builders. Teams were inspired by a number of cuisines including Asian and South American for their lunches. The worksite builders voted for their favourite dish, with the team receiving the most votes winning the Builder's Choice. This team will gain an advantage at the following Food Truck in Brisbane. The weakest team will go directly into the next Sudden Death cook-off.

People's Choice Challenge 4
Team		Dish	Result
WA	Chloe & Kelly	Bourbon Lamb Cutlets with Potato Salad and Kick-Ass Chilli Sauce	Builder's Choice
SA	Bree & Jessica	Jamaican Jerk Chicken with Coconut Rice	Through to Food Truck challenge
NSW	Carly & Tresne	Spicy Indian Prawns with Fragrant Rice	Through to Food Truck challenge
NSW	Cathy & Anna	Beef Rendang with Cucumber Relish	Through to Food Truck challenge
VIC	Helena & Vikki	Asian Style Honey & Soy Chicken with BBQ Corn	Through to Food Truck challenge
QLD	Paul & Blair	Pork Fillet with Satay Sauce, Achar Salad and Turmeric Rice	Through to Food Truck challenge
TAS	Thalia & Bianca	Mexican Chicken with Wedges and Guacamole	Through to Food Truck challenge
NSW	Uel & Shannelle	Korean BBQ Beef with Seafood Pancake	Through to Food Truck challenge
VIC	Josh & Danielle	Prawn and Chorizo Skewers with Seared Beef and Chimichurri Sauce	Through to Sudden Death

==== Food Truck 4: Brisbane, Qld ====
- Episode 32
- Airdate — 23 March 2014
- Location — Brisbane, Qld
- Description — Teams were back on board the Food Truck, once again split into two groups, running and serving two restaurants for paying customers in Brisbane's CBD. As winners of the previous People's Choice challenge, Chloe, Kelly and the Black group were able to allocate 4 out of 8 main ingredients for their three-course menu. The black group chose Mackerel for the appetiser, squid and lamb for mains and fresh fruit for dessert. The remaining four ingredients were given to the opposing White group, which included, Moreton Bay bugs for appetiser, kangaroo and spatchcock for mains and finally assorted nuts for dessert. As per usual, customers will pay for what they believe the meal is worth, and the losing group will compete in a Kitchen cook-off. This was the last Food Truck challenge and also the largest, serving a total of 150 customers, previous Food Trucks only had 100.

Food Truck 4
Black Group		Menu		Result
WA	Kelly (Head Chef)	Appetiser	Salt Cured Spanish Mackerel with Watercress Salad and Wasabi Mayonnaise	Safe
WA	Chloe (Maître d')	Appetiser	Salt Cured Spanish Mackerel with Watercress Salad and Wasabi Mayonnaise	Safe
NSW	Cathy & Anna	Main	Lamb Rump with Asparagus and Spring Bean Salad	Safe
TAS	Thalia & Bianca	Main	Mediterranean Stuffed Squid with Roasted Tomato Salsa	Safe
NSW	Carly & Tresne	Dessert	White Chocolate Profiteroles with Summer Berry Compote	Safe
White Group		Menu		Result
SA	Jessica (Head Chef)	Appetiser	Grilled Moreton Bay Bugs with Citrus Salad	Through to Kitchen cook-off
SA	Bree (Maître d')	Appetiser	Grilled Moreton Bay Bugs with Citrus Salad	Through to Kitchen cook-off
QLD	Paul & Blair	Main	Spiced Kangaroo with Garam masala Potatoes and Kachumber Salad	Through to Kitchen cook-off
NSW	Uel & Shannelle	Main	Grilled Indonesian Spatchcock with Coconut Green Beans and Chilli Lime Sauce	Through to Kitchen cook-off
VIC	Helena & Vikki	Dessert	Macadamia and Pistachio with Honey Custard and Crostoli	Through to Kitchen cook-off

==== Kitchen Cook-off ====
- Episode 33
- Airdate — 24 March 2014
- Description — The losing four teams from the Food Truck will face a rapid cook-off. The two best teams selected by the jury and judges will be saved, whilst the bottom two compete in another Showdown. The weakest team from here will head into Sudden Death.
  - Rapid cook-off: Romantic Meal — For the rapid cook-off, teams were challenged to create a romantic meal in 45 minutes, however after teams retrieved their ingredients, they learnt that for this challenge, only one team member can cook, while the other may only taste and advise.
  - Showdown: Chocolate — In the Showdown, the losing teams battled it out in a Chocolate challenge, to create their best dish using chocolate. According to the judges, both teams presented a poor dish, making the decision to send one team into Sudden Death more difficult than intended.

Rapid cook-off
Team		Dish	Result
VIC	Helena & Vikki	Beef Fillet with Green Peppercorn Sauce (Originally Included Potato Croquettes)	Safe (Judge's Choice)
QLD	Paul & Blair	Fettuccine Marinara with Tarragon Cream Sauce	Safe (Jury's Choice)
SA	Bree & Jessica	Poached Ocean Trout with Soba Miso Broth and Tempura Oysters	Through to Showdown
NSW	Uel & Shannelle	Roasted Duck Breast with Peaches Two Ways and Potato & Fennel Purée	Through to Showdown
Showdown
Team		Dish	Result
SA	Bree & Jessica	Dark Chocolate Molten Cake with Hazelnut Biscuit Crumb and Espresso Syrup	Safe
NSW	Uel & Shannelle	Chocolate Mousse with Salted Caramel Peanuts, Almond Biscuit Crumble and Chocolate Shards	Through to Sudden Death

==== Sudden Death ====
- Episode 34
- Airdate — 25 March 2014
- Description — Two teams go head to head in Sudden Death. Both teams presented a three course meal for guest and host judges for scoring and the lower scoring team is eliminated. From Victoria, Josh and Danielle dubbed the 'scientists' of the competition took upon their molecular gastronomy skills, while New South Wales newlyweds, Uel and Shannelle kept to their Asian heritage for their menus. For Uel and Shannelle, they are the only team so far to have competed in a Sudden Death more than once.

Sudden Death cook-off results
Team		Judge's scores						Total (out of 60)	Result
Team		Karen	Guy	Liz	Colin	Pete	Manu	Total (out of 60)	Result
VIC	Josh & Danielle	8	8	7	6	8	8	45	Safe
Dishes	Entree	Slow Cooked Egg with Pea Purée, Pancetta Crumbs and Verjuice Gel							Safe
Dishes	Main	Skin Pork Belly with Beer Stewed Chickpeas							Safe
Dishes	Dessert	Chocolate Ganache with Mint Ice Cream and Avocado Purée							Safe
NSW	Uel & Shannelle	7	7	8	7	7	7	43	Eliminated
Dishes	Entree	Cereal Prawns							Eliminated
Dishes	Main	Beef Short Ribs with Daikon, Carrot Purée and Soya Beans							Eliminated
Dishes	Dessert	Steamed Lemongrass and Kaffir Lime Crème Brûlée							Eliminated

=== Top 8 ===
==== People's Choice 5: Pop-Up Restaurant ====
- Episode 35
- Airdate — 26 March 2014
- Location — Eveleigh Markets at Carriageworks, Redfern
- Description — After gaining all their skills from the Food Truck challenges, teams today opened their own pop-up restaurants serving one main meal to customers. All teams were in charge of cooking, waiting and serving at their own restaurants. Customers dining, paid for what they thought the meal was worth, with the team receiving the most money, winning People's Choice and safe from elimination. Pete and Manu, as always chose the weakest to head straight into Sudden Death. For the middle six teams, the rank order of money earned became the seeding process for the next cook-off in Kitchen Headquarters.

People's Choice Challenge 5
Team		Dish	Result
QLD	Paul & Blair	Lamb Fillet with Smoky Eggplant and Spicy Masala Sauce	People's Choice
SA	Bree & Jessica	Pork Cutlet with Fig and Balsamic Reduction and Almond Pilaf	Through to Kitchen cook-off
NSW	Cathy & Anna	Pan Seared Salmon with Roasted Beetroot and Freekeh Salad	Through to Kitchen cook-off
WA	Chloe & Kelly	Seared Tuna with Pea and Broad Bean Salad and Deep Fried Mac ‘n’ Cheese Balls	Through to Kitchen cook-off
VIC	Helena & Vikki	Snapper with Celeriac Mash and Roasted Capsicum Salsa	Through to Kitchen cook-off
VIC	Josh & Danielle	Sous Vide Scotch Fillet with Glazed Carrots, Potato Purée and Mushroom Jus	Through to Kitchen cook-off
TAS	Thalia & Bianca	Seared Tiger Prawns with Goat's Cheese Tortellini and Burnt Butter Sauce	Through to Kitchen cook-off
NSW	Carly & Tresne	Lamb Cutlets with Mint & Walnut Pesto and Pomegranate Salad	Through to Sudden Death

==== Kitchen cook-off ====
- Episode 36
- Airdate — 30 March 2014
- Description
  - Rapid Cook-off: One on One: The six teams were to compete head to head with another team in a 30-minute rapid cook-off. The money ranking from the previous challenge determined how the game process will be played out. As Bree and Jessica received the most money out of the six, they were able to choose their opponent, however their opponent determined which protein both teams will use to cook. In this case, Thalia and Bianca were the selected opponent and chose game meats as the protein. Next in line was Cathy and Anna, choosing Helena and Vikki as their opponent. They then chose lamb as the protein. Out of the two remaining teams, Josh and Danielle had made more money than Chloe and Kelly, but since they were left with no choice of opponent, they were able to choose the protein and decided on fish. The three winning teams from each head to head became safe from elimination, while the three losing teams headed into the next Showdown.
  - Showdown: Entree, Main, Dessert: As the losing teams from the previous head to head battles, they must now cook one course out of Entree, Main and Dessert in an hour. Only one team can cook one course and this was decided in a verbal first-say-first-go basis between the three teams. The losing team from this Showdown, headed into Sudden Death with Carly and Tresne.

Rapid cook-off
Bree & Jessica	SA	Vs.	TAS	Thalia & Bianca
Thai Duck Salad with Deep Fried Vermicelli		Dish	Deep Fried Spiced Squab with Asian Salad	
Through to Showdown		Result	Safe	
Cathy & Anna	NSW	Vs.	VIC	Helena & Vikki
Roasted Lamb Rack with Sautéed Eggplant, Olive Tapenade and Basil Pesto		Dish	Za’atar-Crusted Lamb with Roasted Beetroot Salad and Goat's Cheese Yoghurt Sauce	
Safe		Result	Through to Showdown	
Josh & Danielle	VIC	Vs.	WA	Chloe & Kelly
Pan Fried Barramundi in a Thai Coconut Broth with Coriander Salad		Dish	Stuffed Sardines with Tomato and Black Olive Salsa	
Through to Showdown		Result	Safe	

Showdown
Team		Dish	Result
VIC	Helena & Vikki	Frangipane Tart with Stewed Rhubarb and Cream (Dessert)	Safe
VIC	Josh & Danielle	Scampi Risotto (Main)	Safe
SA	Bree & Jessica	Cavatelli with Cauliflower Sauce and Pangrattato (Entree)	Through to Sudden Death

==== Sudden Death ====
- Episode 37
- Airdate — 31 March 2014
- Description — SA mums face Carly & Tresne in a Sudden Death cook-off. Teams cooked a three-course menu for guest and host judges, the winning team advances to the Top 7 Finals Decider, while the losing team is eliminated. Both teams received excellent feedback for their entree and dessert however both fell short on their main and had issues cooking their meat. The judges scores resulted in a one-point difference between the winner and loser. For Carly and Tresne, it was their second time competing in a Sudden Death elimination.

Sudden Death cook-off results
Team		Judge's scores						Total (out of 60)	Result
Team		Karen	Guy	Liz	Colin	Pete	Manu	Total (out of 60)	Result
SA	Bree & Jessica	5	7	7	6	7	7	39	Safe
Dishes	Entree	Seared Prawns with Fennel and Leek Purée and Tomato Salsa							Safe
Dishes	Main	Roasted Chicken Ballotine with Quinoa and Lentil Salad and Garlic Aioli							Safe
Dishes	Dessert	Dark Chocolate Mousse Tart with Strawberries and Pistachios							Safe
NSW	Carly & Tresne	6	7	6	6	7	6	38	Eliminated
Dishes	Entree	Golden Scallops with Champagne Sabayon, Pancetta Crumb and Watercress							Eliminated
Dishes	Main	Wagyu Scotch Fillet with Roasted Beetroot Salad, Frizzled Onions and Beef Glaze							Eliminated
Dishes	Dessert	Turkish Mousse with Raspberry and Rosewater							Eliminated

=== Top 7 ===
==== Farmer's Challenge ====
- Episode 38
- Airdate — 1 April 2014
- Description — In Kitchen Headquarters, teams cooked meals for the farmers and suppliers of the fresh produce used by the show. It was a celebratory feast to honour and acknowledge their great efforts. Teams had 90 minutes to prepare their dishes right under the watchful eye of the farmers, who all voted for their favourite meal. Judges, Pete and Manu chose the winning team, to be safe from the next two eliminations. The farmers' vote count of the remaining six teams allocated them into two Knock-out groups. 2nd, 4th and 6th place will face off in Group 1 and 1st, 3rd and 5th for Group 2.

Farmer's challenge
Team		Dish	Vote Count	Result
QLD	Paul & Blair	Beef and Prawns with Pickled Vegetables and Nam Jim Sauce	Winners (Safe)	
VIC	Josh & Danielle	Asian Pork with Prawns on Watermelon	8	Through to Knock-out: Group 1
VIC	Helena & Vikki	Confit Salmon with Niçoise Salad and Sweet Potato Rösti	4	Through to Knock-out: Group 1
WA	Chloe & Kelly	—N/a ^{1}	0	Through to Knock-out: Group 1
NSW	Cathy & Anna	Crab Tortillas with Coleslaw and Tomato Salsa	13	Through to Knock-out: Group 2
SA	Bree & Jessica	Beef Tortillas with Avocado Salsa and Lime Chili Mayonnaise	7	Through to Knock-out: Group 2
TAS	Thalia & Bianca	Lamb Backstrap with Cauliflower Purée and Salsa Verde	3	Through to Knock-out: Group 2

Note:

- ^1 - Due to urgent family matters at home, Chloe and Kelly were absent and did not compete in this challenge.

==== Knock-out: Group 1 ====
- Episode 39
- Airdate — 2 April 2014
- Description — The Knock-out round is split into three parts; The first part was a skills test which required teams to fillet a fish in 10 minutes. The team that did the best job gained an advantage of allocating a main ingredient for themselves and the other teams to use in the second challenge. These included; brains, lemon & limes and ocean trout. Teams must produce a dish with their allocated ingredient in one hour, one team is safe while the other two go into a final Sudden Death round. For this, teams must produce their signature dish for scoring by the guest and host judges, the lower scoring team is eliminated. The two surviving teams advance to the Top 5 finals round.

Round 1: Skills Test
Task				Winner					
Filleting a fish				Chloe & Kelly					
Round 2: Cook-off
Team		Dish							Result
WA	Chloe & Kelly	Crispy Brains with Lentils and Green Sauce							Safe
VIC	Helena & Vikki	Lemon Poached Barramundi with Crispy Potatoes and Leek Purée							Through to Sudden Death
VIC	Josh & Danielle	Confit Ocean Trout with Asian Herb Salad and Deep Fried Brussels Sprouts							Through to Sudden Death
Round 3: Sudden Death
Team		Judge's scores						Total (out of 60)	Result
Team		Karen	Guy	Liz	Colin	Pete	Manu	Total (out of 60)	Result
VIC	Helena & Vikki	7	7	6	6	7	6	39	Safe
Signature Dish		Greek Walnut Cake with Vanilla Crème Anglaise							Safe
VIC	Josh & Danielle	6	6	6	5	6	6	35	Eliminated
Signature Dish		Mexican Spiced Beef in Broth							Eliminated

==== Knock-out: Group 2 ====
- Episode 40
- Airdate — 7 April 2014
- Description — The next three teams competed in Group 2 of the knock-outs to secure the last two remaining spots in the Top 5. The first skills test, required teams to successfully truss a piece of beef. Whichever team did the neatest and most successful job gained the advantage to allocate a main ingredient for themselves and the other teams to cook with. Ingredients on offer included, beef, skate wings and chocolate. With their allocated ingredient, teams had one hour to create a dish for judging. One team is safe while the other two head into a final Sudden Death round. Teams must now cook their signature dish to host and guest judges for scoring, the lower scoring team was eliminated while the surviving team takes the last spot in the Top 5.

Round 1: Skills Test
Task				Winner					
Trussing a beef tenderloin				Cathy & Anna					
Round 2: Cook-off
Team		Dish							Result
TAS	Thalia & Bianca	Skate Wings with Pea Purée and Bubble and Squeak							Safe
SA	Bree & Jessica	Chocolate Ravioli with Chocolate Sauce and Orange							Through to Sudden Death
NSW	Cathy & Anna	Beef Fillet with Cauliflower Purée, Mushrooms and Wilted Spinach							Through to Sudden Death
Round 3: Sudden Death
Team		Judge's scores						Total (out of 60)	Result
Team		Karen	Guy	Liz	Colin	Pete	Manu	Total (out of 60)	Result
SA	Bree & Jessica	8	9	9	8	9	8	51	Safe
Signature Dish		Butter Chicken with Red Lentil Dhal and Rice							Safe
NSW	Cathy & Anna	9	8	9	8	8	8	50	Eliminated
Signature Dish		Chermoula Quail with Roasted Baby Carrots and Quinoa Salad							Eliminated

=== Top 5 ===
==== Ultimate Instant Restaurant ====
- Episodes 41 to 45
- Airdate — 8 April to 23 April
- Description — The Top 5 teams headed around the country again to compete in an Ultimate Instant restaurant round. All five teams invited their fellow opposing finalists to their homes for a three-course dinner. Unlike the initial rounds, teams now have to cook two dishes of each course and guest teams were able to select any one of each course. Pete and Manu each tried one of the two options, which means they do not score the same dish. The lowest scoring team for this round is eliminated as the top 4 are ranked into the Semi-Finals.

Colour key:
– Score for Option 1
– Score for Option 2

Instant Restaurant Summary
Top 5
Team and Episode Details			Guest Scores					Pete's Scores			Manu's Scores			Total (out of 100)	Rank	Result
Team and Episode Details			P&B	C&K	T&B	B&J	H&V	Entrée	Main	Dessert	Entrée	Main	Dessert	Total (out of 100)	Rank	Result
QLD	Paul & Blair		—	7	6	6	7	6	6	9	6	7	10	70	1st	Through to Semi-Final 1
Ep 41	8 April		Swell													Through to Semi-Final 1
Dishes	Entrées	1	Tempura Prawns with Beetroot Puree													Through to Semi-Final 1
Dishes	Entrées	2	Wasabi & Avocado Soup with Marinated Tuna and Tofu Mayonnaise													Through to Semi-Final 1
Dishes	Mains	1	Crispy Skin Salmon with Moreton Bay Bug Ravioli													Through to Semi-Final 1
Dishes	Mains	2	Slow Cooked Beef Cheeks in Soy and Orange Sauce													Through to Semi-Final 1
Dishes	Desserts	1	Triple Chocolate Cheesecake													Through to Semi-Final 1
Dishes	Desserts	2	Spiced Cake with Lime Sorbet and Salty Coconut Sauce													Through to Semi-Final 1
WA	Chloe & Kelly		4	—	5	6	3	6	8	4	10	8	5	59	4th	Through to Semi-Final 1
Ep 42	9 April		Nouveau													Through to Semi-Final 1
Dishes	Entrées	1	Poached Marron with Scallops and Confit Potatoes													Through to Semi-Final 1
Dishes	Entrées	2	Oxtail and Bone Marrow													Through to Semi-Final 1
Dishes	Mains	1	Capretto with Polenta													Through to Semi-Final 1
Dishes	Mains	2	Venison Fillet with Blackberries													Through to Semi-Final 1
Dishes	Desserts	1	Brioche Doughnuts with Elderflower Curd and Fennel Sorbet													Through to Semi-Final 1
Dishes	Desserts	2	Truffled Truffle with Truffle Ice-Cream													Through to Semi-Final 1
TAS	Thalia & Bianca		6	5	—	5	6	4	9	3	8	5	7	58	5th	Eliminated
Ep 43	21 April		The Market Kitchen													Eliminated
Dishes	Entrées	1	Fried Silverbeet Ravioli with Basil Filling													Eliminated
Dishes	Entrées	2	Salmon Rillettes with Olive Oil Crackers													Eliminated
Dishes	Mains	1	Blue-Eye Trevalla with Potato Scales and Pea Sauce													Eliminated
Dishes	Mains	2	Pinot Braised Duck with Red Cabbage and Pear Salad													Eliminated
Dishes	Desserts	1	Palm Sugar Bavarois with Poached Pear													Eliminated
Dishes	Desserts	2	Rhubarb and Hazelnut Tartlet with Cinnamon Ice Cream													Eliminated
SA	Bree & Jessica		6	4	4	—	5	7	4	9	6	10	8	63	3rd	Through to Semi-Final 2
Ep 44	22 April		Sage													Through to Semi-Final 2
Dishes	Entrées	1	Stuffed Sardines with Orange Reduction													Through to Semi-Final 2
Dishes	Entrées	2	Eggplant and Halloumi Fritters													Through to Semi-Final 2
Dishes	Mains	1	Chicken Mole with Mexican Rice and Plantains													Through to Semi-Final 2
Dishes	Mains	2	Braised Pig Cheeks with Wet Polenta													Through to Semi-Final 2
Dishes	Desserts	1	Roasted Peaches with Mascarpone Ice-Cream													Through to Semi-Final 2
Dishes	Desserts	2	Flan De Cafe with Coconut and Star Anise Churros													Through to Semi-Final 2
VIC	Helena & Vikki		7	5	6	6	—	9	7	5	9	7	4	65	2nd	Through to Semi-Final 2
Ep 45	23 April		Didima													Through to Semi-Final 2
Dishes	Entrées	1	Braised Octopus & Clams with Tomato and Peas													Through to Semi-Final 2
Dishes	Entrées	2	Kataifi Wrapped Prawns with Zucchini Salad													Through to Semi-Final 2
Dishes	Mains	1	Lemon & Oregano Lamb with Greek Beans													Through to Semi-Final 2
Dishes	Mains	2	Piri Piri Quail with Saffron Rice and Cucumber Salsa													Through to Semi-Final 2
Dishes	Desserts	1	Galaktoboureko with Ice Cream and Grilled Figs													Through to Semi-Final 2
Dishes	Desserts	2	Individual Hazelnut Mousse Cake													Through to Semi-Final 2

=== Semifinals ===
==== Semifinal 1 ====
- Episode 46
- Airdate — 27 April 2014
- Description — Paul and Blair face-off Chloe and Kelly in the first semifinal. Teams must cook a three-course meal for guest judges and Pete and Manu, following the Sudden Death format. The winning team advances into the Grand Final as the losing team is eliminated.

Semifinal 1
Team		Judge's scores						Total (out of 60)	Result
Team		Karen	Guy	Liz	Colin	Pete	Manu	Total (out of 60)	Result
WA	Chloe & Kelly	8	7	8	8	8	8	47	Through to Grand Final
Dishes	Entree	Lobster with Smoked Salmon and Lotus Root							Through to Grand Final
Dishes	Main	Pesce Acqua Pazza with Confit Tomatoes							Through to Grand Final
Dishes	Dessert	Strawberry Champagne Trifle							Through to Grand Final
QLD	Paul & Blair	7	8	9	7	7	8	46	Eliminated
Dishes	Entree	Pink Snapper with Tomato & Lemongrass Broth							Eliminated
Dishes	Main	Kangaroo Fillet with Baby Beetroot and Blueberry Sauce							Eliminated
Dishes	Dessert	Espresso Parfait with Sesame Seed Wafer							Eliminated

==== Semifinal 2 ====
- Episode 47
- Airdate — 28 April 2014
- Description — The final spot in the Grand final is up for grabs during the second semi-final. Bree and Jessica take on Helena and Vikki for the last time in a three-course Sudden death cook-off. The losing team is eliminated as the winner heads into the Grand Final to face Chloe and Kelly.

Semifinal 2
Team		Judge's scores						Total (out of 60)	Result
Team		Karen	Guy	Liz	Colin	Pete	Manu	Total (out of 60)	Result
SA	Bree & Jessica	8	9	9	8	9	9	52	Through to Grand Final
Dishes	Entree	Mushroom Wontons with Prawns and Hot & Sour Broth							Through to Grand Final
Dishes	Main	Smoked Duck Breast with Seared Scallops and Asian Greens							Through to Grand Final
Dishes	Dessert	Peach & Apricot Tarte Tatin with Cinnamon Ice Cream							Through to Grand Final
VIC	Helena & Vikki	7	7	7	7	7	7	42	Eliminated
Dishes	Entree	Scampi Ceviche with Carrot Purée and Watercress Salad							Eliminated
Dishes	Main	Quail with Stuffed Vine Leaves and Avgolemono Sauce							Eliminated
Dishes	Dessert	Burnt Butter Custard with Coffee and Almonds							Eliminated

=== Grand Final ===
- Episode 48
- Airdate — 29 April 2014
- Description — In the final cook-off for the series, the top 2 teams face-off in the ultimate Grand Final. Teams must cook a 5 course meal and serve 20 plates for each course to all eliminated teams, friends and family. Guest judges returned for the final verdict of awarding the $250,000 prize to the winners.

Grand Final
Team		Judge's scores						Total (out of 60)	Result
Team		Karen	Guy	Liz	Colin	Pete	Manu	Total (out of 60)	Result
SA	Bree & Jessica	9	9	9	9	9	9	54	Winners
Dishes	1st Course	Beetroot Carpaccio with Cured Salmon							Winners
Dishes	2nd Course	Open Scallop Lasagne							Winners
Dishes	3rd Course	Spiced Squab with Heirloom Carrots and Pomegranate Jus							Winners
Dishes	4th Course	Ouzo & Tomato Braised Lamb with Wild Greens, Potatoes and Consommé							Winners
Dishes	5th Course	Deconstructed Chocolate & Rhubarb Tart							Winners
WA	Chloe & Kelly	9	9	8	8	9	9	52	Runners-up
Dishes	1st Course	Caprese Salad							Runners-up
Dishes	2nd Course	Confit Ocean Trout with Broad Bean Pesto							Runners-up
Dishes	3rd Course	Veal Sweetbreads with Morel Mushroom Sauce and Pea Foam							Runners-up
Dishes	4th Course	Pig's Trotter Crépinette with Crispy Pig's Ears							Runners-up
Dishes	5th Course	Rose Chocolate with Spiced Figs and Pistachio Ice Cream							Runners-up

== Ratings ==
Colour key:
– Highest rating during the series
– Lowest rating during the series
– An elimination was held in this episode
– Finals week

Wk.	Episode		Air date	Viewers (in millions)^{[a]}	Rank (Night)^{[a]}	Rank (Week)^{[a]}	Source
1	1	Instant restaurant 1–1: Annie & Jason	Monday, 27 January	1.774	#1	#2	
1	2	Instant restaurant 1–2: Andrew & Emelia	Tuesday, 28 January	1.706	#1	#3	
1	3	Instant restaurant 1–3: Paul & Blair	Wednesday, 29 January	1.797	#1	#1	
2	4	Instant restaurant 1–4: Helena & Vikki	Sunday, 2 February	1.793	#1	#4	
2	5	Instant restaurant 1–5: Deb & Rick	Monday, 3 February	1.944	#1	#2	
2	6	Instant restaurant 1–6: Chloe & Kelly	Tuesday, 4 February	2.222	#1	#1	
2	7	Instant restaurant 2–1: Uel & Shannelle	Wednesday, 5 February	1.794	#1	#3	
3	8	Instant restaurant 2–2: David & Corinne	Sunday, 9 February	1.745	#3	#6	
3	9	Instant restaurant 2–3: Thalia & Bianca	Monday, 10 February	2.052	#1	#2	
3	10	Instant restaurant 2–4: Harry & Christo	Tuesday, 11 February	1.922	#1	#5	
3	11	Instant restaurant 2–5: Bree & Jessica	Wednesday, 12 February	2.096	#1	#3	
4	12	Instant restaurant 2–6: Jess & Felix	Sunday, 16 February	1.967	#2	#5	
4	13	Instant restaurant 3–1: Carly & Tresne	Monday, 17 February	2.020	#1	#2	
4	14	Instant restaurant 3–2: Chloe & Kelly	Tuesday, 18 February	2.012	#1	#3	
4	15	Instant restaurant 3–3: Josh & Danielle	Wednesday, 19 February	2.009	#1	#4	
5	16	Instant restaurant 3–4: Harry & Christo	Sunday, 23 February	1.859	#2	#5	
5	17	Instant restaurant 3–5: David & Corinne	Monday, 24 February	2.262	#1	#1	
5	18	Instant restaurant 3–6: Cathy & Anna	Tuesday, 25 February	2.254	#1	#2	
5	19	People's Choice 1: Breakfast at Central	Wednesday, 26 February	1.897	#1	#4	
6	20	Food Truck 1: Cronulla, NSW	Sunday, 2 March	1.739	#1	#4	
6	21	Kitchen Cook-off 1	Monday, 3 March	1.816	#1	#1	
6	22	Sudden Death 1	Tuesday, 4 March	1.792	#1	#2	
6	23	People's Choice 2: School Lunch	Wednesday, 5 March	1.761	#1	#3	
7	24	Food Truck 2: Melbourne, VIC	Sunday, 9 March	1.655	#2	#5	
7	25	Kitchen Cook-off 2	Monday, 10 March	1.841	#1	#1	
7	26	Sudden Death 2	Tuesday, 11 March	1.828	#1	#2	
7	27	People's Choice 3: Italian Festival	Wednesday, 12 March	1.764	#1	#3	
8	28	Food Truck 3: Parramatta, NSW	Sunday, 16 March	1.424^{1}	#3	#7	
8	29	Kitchen Cook-off 3	Monday, 17 March	1.752	#1	#2	
8	30	Sudden Death 3	Tuesday, 18 March	1.774	#1	#1	
8	31	People's Choice 4: Builder's Site BBQ	Wednesday, 19 March	1.695	#1	#4	
9	32	Food Truck 4: Brisbane, QLD	Sunday, 23 March	1.650	#2	#6	
9	33	Kitchen Cook-off 4	Monday, 24 March	1.753	#1	#4	
9	34	Sudden Death 4	Tuesday, 25 March	1.847	#2	#3	
9	35	People's Choice 5: Pop-Up Restaurant	Wednesday, 26 March	1.733	#1	#5	
10	36	Kitchen Cook-off 5	Sunday, 30 March	1.671	#2	#7	
10	37	Sudden Death 5	Monday, 31 March	1.750	#1	#4	
10	38	Farmer's Challenge	Tuesday, 1 April	1.733	#2	#5	
10	39	Knock-out: Group 1	Wednesday, 2 April	1.752	#1	#3	
11	40	Knock-out: Group 2	Monday, 7 April	1.723	#1	#7	
11	41	Ultimate Instant Restaurant 1: Paul & Blair	Tuesday, 8 April	1.816	#1	#5	
11	42	Ultimate Instant Restaurant 2: Chloe & Kelly	Wednesday, 9 April	1.783	#4	#6	
12	43	Ultimate Instant Restaurant 3: Thalia & Bianca	Monday, 21 April	2.006	#1	#3	
12	44	Ultimate Instant Restaurant 4: Bree & Jessica	Tuesday, 22 April	2.175	#1	#1	
12	45	Ultimate Instant Restaurant 5: Helena & Vikki	Wednesday, 23 April	2.081	#1	#2	
13	46	Semifinal 1	Sunday, 27 April	2.003	#1	#4	
13	47	Semifinal 2	Monday, 28 April	2.088	#1	#3	
13	48	Grand Final	Tuesday, 29 April	2.408	#2	#2	
13	48	Winner Announcement	Tuesday, 29 April	2.712	#1	#1	
Series Average				1.891	#1	#4	

Notes:

1. South Australian viewers excluded.

^{a} Ratings data used is from OzTAM and represents the consolidated viewership from the 5 largest Australian metropolitan centres (Sydney, Melbourne, Brisbane, Perth and Adelaide).
