= Matt Alonzo =

American director, video editor and filmmaker

- Born: October 16, 1985 (age 40)
- Occupations: Music video director, commercial director, filmmaker
- Years active: 2004–present
- Website: www.mattalonzo.com

Matt Alonzo (born April 16, 1985) is an American director, video editor and filmmaker.

== Early life and career ==
Alonzo grew up in Carpinteria, California and studied at Brooks Institute. His big break came in 2008 when he filmed and edited a Lil Wayne concert that amassed more than 10 million YouTube views.

Alonzo later partnered with DJ Skee and helped develop one of the first popular YouTube channels, Skee.TV. In early 2011, Alonzo left Skee.TV and started his own production company, Modern Artists Creative.

In late 2010, he signed with International Creative Management for feature film representation; and Lark Creative for music video representation.

Alonzo joined the creative and production team of DJ Skee SKEE Live as director for Mark Cuban AXS TV network. Alonzo set the tone and creative vision for SKEE Live segments including "Up Close," "Off The Top" and "Spotlight" featuring top athletes and musicians. In addition, Alonzo lead the overall creative team to guide the look of the show including set production, graphics and lighting.

Alonzo has directed music videos for the likes of Yo Yo Honey Singh, Pitbull, Odd Future, The Game, Justin Bieber, Sophia Grace, Chris Cornell, Maejor, Ice Cube, New Boyz, Armin van Buuren, Xzibit and Tyrese. His video "Like A G6" for Far East Movement gained international attention when it was nominated for a MTV Japan VMA under the category for Best Hip-Hop Music Video.

The Game explained in an interview with MTV "Ever since we did 'Dope Boys,' 'Martians vs. Goblins' and 'Celebration,' Matt Alonzo has been my go to director."
