= Boom Boom (Justice Crew song) =

Single by Justice Crew

from the album Live by the Words
- Released: 2 July 2012
- Genre: Dance-pop, hip house
- Length: 3:05
- Label: Sony
- Songwriter: Jay Sean
- Producer: Orange Factory Music

Justice Crew singles chronology
"Sexy and You Know It" (2011)	"Boom Boom" (2012)	"Gonna Make You Sweat (Everybody Dance Now)" (2012)

"Boom Boom" is a song recorded by Australian hip hop dance and pop group Justice Crew. It was written by Jay Sean and produced by Orange Factory Music. "Boom Boom" was released digitally in Australia on 2 July 2012, as the group's fifth overall single and the first single from their debut studio album Live by the Words (2014). It peaked at number one on the ARIA Singles Chart and was certified six times platinum by the Australian Recording Industry Association, denoting sales of 420,000 copies. The song also peaked at number three on the New Zealand Singles Chart and was certified two times platinum by the Recording Industry Association of New Zealand, denoting sales of 30,000 copies.

== Background and release ==
"Boom Boom" was written by British recording artist Jay Sean, and produced by Jeremy Skaller and Robert Larow under their stage name Orange Factory Music. It was released digitally on 2 July 2012, and physically on 6 July 2012. On 1 October 2012, it was announced that Justice Crew signed to American rapper Pitbull's record label Mr. 305 Inc., a joint venture with RCA Records, to release "Boom Boom" in the United States. "Boom Boom" was originally recorded by Pitbull for his own album. However, he turned it down and the song was eventually given to Justice Crew. Pitbull heard "Boom Boom" during his visit to Australia for his Planet Pit World Tour in August 2012 and recognised the song. He then visited the Sony Music Australia headquarters and watched the music video for "Boom Boom", and he and his management were impressed with Justice Crew's dancing skills. They invited Justice Crew to perform the song at his concert in Sydney.

== Reception ==
A writer for Take 40 Australia called "Boom Boom" a "definite winter party anthem!", while a writer for The Hot Hits Live from LA described it as a "killer new song". "Boom Boom" debuted at number 24 on the ARIA Singles Chart on 9 July 2012. It peaked at number one in its fifth week in the chart, becoming Justice Crew's first number one single. They became the first Australian group in five years to reach number one. "Boom Boom" remained atop the ARIA Singles Chart for two consecutive weeks. The song was certified six times platinum by the Australian Recording Industry Association, denoting sales of 420,000 copies. In New Zealand, it debuted at number 32 on 13 August 2012, and peaked at number three in its fifth week in the chart. "Boom Boom" was certified two times platinum by the Recording Industry Association of New Zealand, denoting sales of 30,000 copies.

== Promotion ==
The accompanying music video for "Boom Boom" premiered on Vevo on 29 June 2012. Justice Crew performed "Boom Boom" on Australia's Got Talent on 4 July 2012. They later performed the song during the Sunrise Street Party in Hawthorn, Victoria on 6 July 2012.

== Track listing ==
- Digital download
1. "Boom Boom" – 3:05
- CD single
1. "Boom Boom" – 3:05
2. "Boom Boom" (Bodega Bullies Club Remix)
3. "Boom Boom" (Supasound Club Remix)
4. "Boom Boom" (Supasound Dub Remix)
5. "Boom Boom" (Karaoke Mix)

== Charts ==
=== Weekly charts ===
Chart (2012–13)	Peak position
Australia (ARIA)	1
Germany (GfK)	46
New Zealand (Recorded Music NZ)	3

=== Year-end charts ===
Chart (2012)	Position
ARIA Singles Chart	7
Australian Artist Singles Chart	2

Chart (2013)	Position
Australian Artist Singles Chart	41

== Certifications ==
Region	Certification	Certified units/sales
Australia (ARIA)	6× Platinum	420,000^{^}
New Zealand (RMNZ)	2× Platinum	30,000^{*}
^{*} Sales figures based on certification alone.^{^} Shipments figures based on certification alone.

== Release history ==
Region	Date	Format	Label
Australia	2 July 2012	Digital download	Sony Music Australia
Australia	6 July 2012	CD single	Sony Music Australia
United States	2 April 2013	Rhythmic radio	Mr. 305 Inc.
United States	23 April 2013	Mainstream radio	Mr. 305 Inc.

== See also ==
- List of number-one singles of 2012 (Australia)
