= Justice Crew =

Australian music act

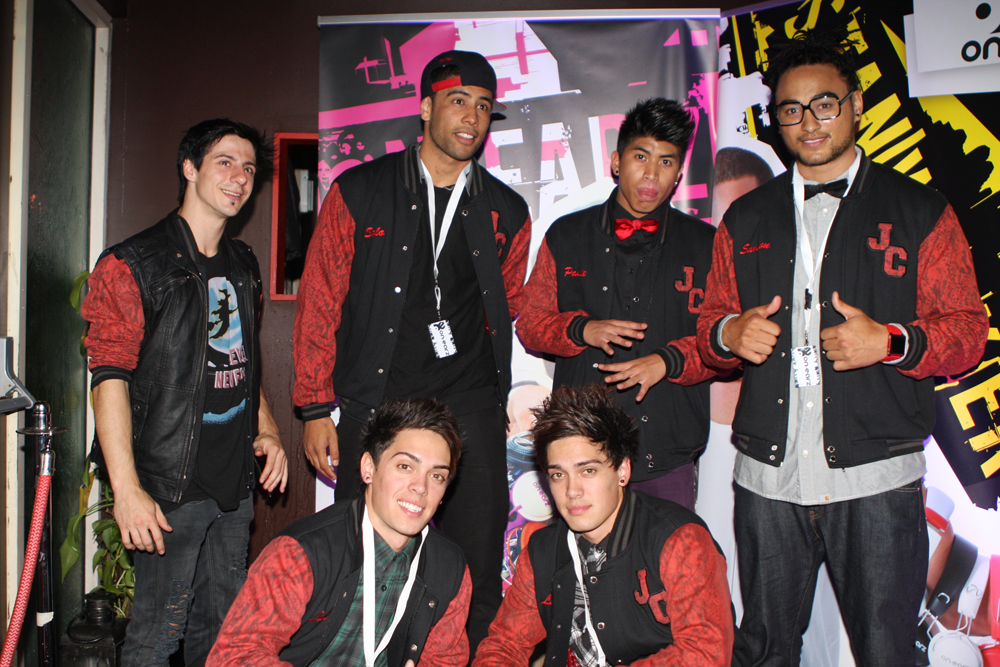
- Justice Crew in May 2012

Background information
- Origin: Sydney, New South Wales, Australia
- Genre: Dance-pop
- Years active: 2009–2020 • 2025
- Past members: John Pearce; Len Pearce; Lukas Bellesini; Paul Merciadez; Samson Smith; Solo Tohi; Emmanuel Rodriguez; Omar Kamari; Anastasios Repousis

Justice Crew are an Australian dance and music group consisting of John and Len Pearce, Lukas Bellesini, Paul Merciadez, Samson Smith, and Solo Tohi. Although the group is Australian, members Samson and Solo are from New Zealand. The group originally formed in 2009 as a dance troupe and rose to fame the following year as winners of the fourth season of Australia's Got Talent. Justice Crew subsequently signed a record deal with Sony Music Australia and became recording artists. As of 2018, they are an independent music group.

Justice Crew's first three singles "And Then We Dance", "Friday to Sunday" and "Dance with Me" achieved moderate success on the ARIA Singles Chart. The group earned their first number-one single with "Boom Boom", which was certified six times platinum by the Australian Recording Industry Association. Subsequent singles "Best Night" and "Everybody" were top-ten hits, and "Que Sera" became their second number-one single. Since becoming recording artists, Justice Crew has been nominated for eight ARIA Music Awards and has toured with international artists such as Chris Brown, Janet Jackson, One Direction, Kesha and Pitbull.

== History ==
=== 2009–2011: Formation, Australia's Got Talent and music releases ===
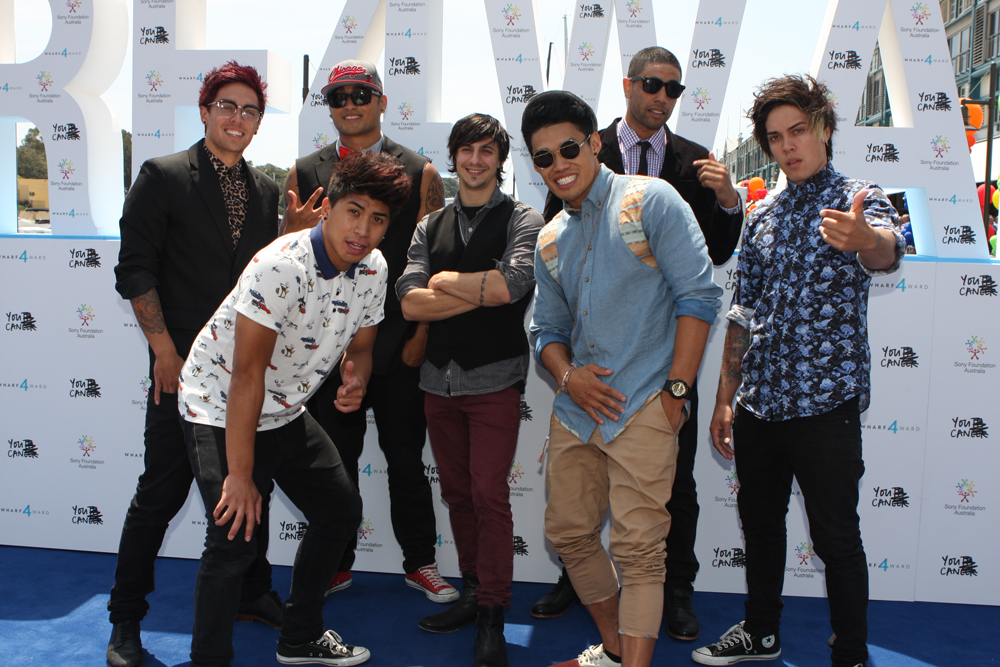
Justice Crew in October 2012

The members of Justice Crew were originally in two separate dance troupes, but they merged as one group in 2009. Justice Crew learnt all their dance moves from YouTube videos such as Michael Jackson's. They entered the 2009 World Hip Hop Dance Championships competition held in Las Vegas, as one of the several groups who represented Australia. Justice Crew placed 13th in the competition.

After being inspired by Britain's Got Talent winners Diversity, Justice Crew decided to audition for the fourth season of Australia's Got Talent in 2010. They wanted to "encourage young people to follow their dreams and believe that anything is possible." Justice Crew won the season and were awarded a prize of $250,000.

In August 2010, it was announced that Justice Crew had signed a record deal with Sony Music Australia. Their debut single "And Then We Dance", released on 27 August 2010, peaked at number 26 on the ARIA Singles Chart and was certified platinum by the Australian Recording Industry Association for sales of 70,000 copies. It was followed by the release of their first video album also titled And Then We Dance on 27 September 2010. The album featured a documentary of Justice Crew's first dance experiences as individuals and how they came together as a group. It also showcased their dance routines and individual tricks. Justice Crew's second single "Friday to Sunday", released on 17 December 2010, peaked at number 18 on the ARIA Singles Chart and was certified double platinum for sales of 140,000 copies.

Justice Crew's third single "Dance with Me", which features American rapper Flo Rida, was released on 29 March 2011 to moderate success; it peaked at number 44 on the ARIA Singles Chart and was certified gold for sales of 35,000 copies. The following month, Justice Crew and Jessica Mauboy were the supporting acts for Chris Brown's Australian leg of his F.A.M.E. Tour. Justice Crew later embarked on the Dance with Me Live Tour, their first headlining concert tour, across Australia in August 2011 and ended in September 2011. After the release of their fourth single "Sexy and You Know It", Justice Crew toured with Janet Jackson on the Australian leg of her Number Ones: Up Close and Personal tour in October 2011. Justice Crew released their first compilation album Justice Crew Party Mix on 18 November 2011, which features a DJ mix of five of their songs and fourteen songs from other artists, as well as a bonus DVD. The album debuted at number five on the ARIA Compilation Albums Chart.

=== 2012–2018: Live by the Words ===
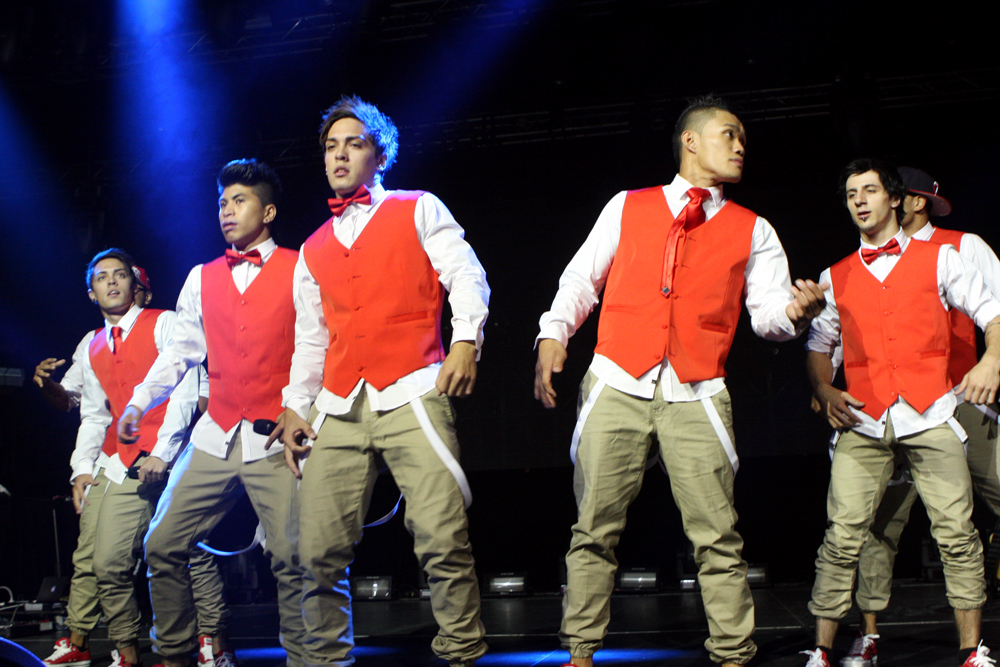
Justice Crew performing during One Direction's Up All Night Tour in Sydney

From January to February 2012, Justice Crew embarked on their Sexy and You Know It Live Tour across Australia. In April 2012, Justice Crew and Johnny Ruffo were the supporting acts for One Direction's Australian leg of their Up All Night Tour. The group's fifth single "Boom Boom", released on 2 July 2012, became their first number-one single on the ARIA Charts and was certified six times platinum for sales of 420,000 copies. On 1 October 2012, it was announced that Justice Crew had signed to Pitbull's record label Mr. 305 Inc., a joint venture with RCA Records, to release "Boom Boom" in the United States. The group's seventh single "Best Night", released on 30 November 2012, peaked at number seven on the ARIA Singles Chart and was certified double platinum. Their next single "Everybody", released on 11 October 2013, peaked at number six and was certified double platinum.

Justice Crew represented Australia at the ABU TV Song Festival in Hanoi, Vietnam on 26 October 2013, performing a mix of "Boom Boom" and "Best Night". On 24 January 2014, they released a cover of "I Am Australian" with Dami Im, Jessica Mauboy, Nathaniel Willemse, Samantha Jade and Taylor Henderson, to coincide with the Australia Day celebrations. The song peaked at number 51 on the ARIA Singles Chart. Justice Crew embarked on the #HypeTour, their third headlining concert tour, across Australia in April 2014 with special guest Jai Waetford.

In May 2014, Justice Crew released their tenth single "Que Sera", which debuted at number one on the ARIA Singles Chart and remained at number one for nine consecutive weeks. It was certified five times platinum for sales of 350,000 copies. The group's eleventh lead single "Rise & Fall" was released on 24 October 2014, and debuted at number 11. Their debut studio album Live by the Words was released on 28 November 2014, and debuted at number seven on the ARIA Albums Chart. Justice Crew embarked on the Live & Local Tour, their fourth headlining concert tour, across regional New South Wales in January 2016. This was followed by the 'What We Do' tour throughout September and October 2016.

=== 2019: America's Got Talent and "So Long" ===
In January 2019, Justice Crew competed in America's Got Talent: The Champions, but were eliminated in the first episode. On 18 January 2019, Justice Crew independently released "So Long".

=== 2024 Paris Olympics Commentary ===
Samson Smith, a member of Justice Crew, appeared on Channel 10's The Project to comment on the Paris 2024 Olympics' Breaking competition, reflecting on Australian Olympian Rachael Gunn's performance at the event as Raygun and the subsequent backlash the breaker received from the general public. Samson Smith expressed his wish for greater attention and recognition of the breakers who medalled at the event. He also explained that Raygun's performance should be viewed as a whole piece, rather than a series of slowed down memes, and to respect that these moves should not be perceived as comical, but a representation of Raygun's character. He is quoted as saying, "At the end of the day, it's just a human being coming out to show their creativity".

== Other ventures ==
=== Commercial endorsements ===
In June 2010, Justice Crew appeared in one of the television commercials promoting the second season of The X Factor Australia. In December 2010, they appeared in promotional images for underwear label Sly. In May 2011, Justice Crew appeared in Swisse Vitamins' television commercials dancing to their single "Dance with Me". In January 2012, the group appeared in Meat and Livestock Australia spokesman Sam Kekovich's music video for his Australian rendition of Aqua's "Barbie Girl", which was released to promote the lamb industry.

=== Philanthropy ===
In 2010, Justice Crew began running free dance lessons. The lessons became so popular they caught the eye of Karen Day who helped get some funding and helped Justice perform at some major events. The free dance lessons became a program known as MMAD Moves and came under a charity known as Musicians Making a Difference (MMAD) which is an organisation that inspires young people through dance & music. MMAD teamed up with The Salvation Army to connect the program with a key partner. Justice Crew have previously joined various Salvation Army corps, including Miranda, New South Wales and Hurstville, New South Wales. They also regularly perform at annual Christmas Carol events such as the Carols in the Domain and Carols in the City, where performers donate their time to raise money for various charities.

In 2011, four members of Justice Crew made a surprise appearance at Canowindra High School's anti-bullying day launch. They performed for the students and communicated that bullies should back off as part of the school's "back off bully" campaign.

== Members ==
=== Current members ===
- John Len Ruela Adamo Pearce and Len "Lenny" John Ruela Pearce are twin brothers from Sydney. They are of Filipino and Australian descent. They were inspired to learn hip-hop dance from viewing a film when they were younger. John and Len attended Hunters Hill High School. They created a dance group at school called the Athelites which consisted of close friends. The group performed at various dance competitions such as Groove, Looze Control and have performed in the Opera House. Len individually produces pop and house music under his solo alias Wippy Lion. Len is also part of the deep house-pop duo Rumor along with Mitchell Curley. In 2021, John joined The Wiggles as an auxiliary member.
- Lukas Bellesini also known as Wildrok, was previously involved in B-boying crews such as Mass Mayhem and Anarchy Tribe. He has won dance competitions such as the 2007 Australian B-boy Championships and has appeared as contestant on So You Think You Can Dance Australia.
- Paul Eric Merciadez, also known as Paulie, has previously performed in dance crews such as Barbie Boyz and Psyke for dance competitions which included Groove, Looze Control, Showdown and The Easter Show. Although he never had any experience in dancing, Merciadez was asked to perform a dance as part of group called Youth For Chicks in 2006. Merciadez then began B-boying in 2007.
- Samson Cosray Smith is originally from New Zealand and moved to Sydney in 2007. Samson began break dancing in 2002. Since moving to Sydney, he has been introduced to other styles of dance such as krumping and hip-hop. Before becoming a member of Justice Crew, Samson travelled and toured around various countries including Germany, Hong Kong and the United States, dancing, performing and teaching.
- Solo Tohi is from New Zealand and moved to Sydney to pursue a career in dance. He is of Tongan, New Zealander and Tanzanian descent. Solo is a self-taught dancer who began his love of break dancing after being introduced to B-boying at 11 years of age, by his mother, Liya Lupala, as an alternative to traditional sports paths. Liya, working with a youth worker Sam, from the Newtown Youth Center in Donald Maclean Street Newtown, where local Newtown youth used to hang out after school helped Solo establish the Newtown break dance crew called CMB (City Mission Breakers). It was a family and community affair, in which younger brothers often joined in, to perform publicly with their older siblings in the CMB crew. Including Solo's younger brother Tumaini "TJ" Lupala, who often performed with 'official' CMB boys, from 3 years of age, doing gymnastic stunts like being thrown by the boys in a set, flips and head spins. They are also now 17.

=== Former members ===
- Omar Kamara, also known as Scrap, is of African Australian descent. He left Justice Crew in 2011.
- Anastasios Tass Repousis, also known as Kid Taz, is a B-boy dancer. He started dancing in 2004 because his father was an old school B-boy in the 1980s. Before becoming a member of Justice Crew, Repousis was a member of dance crews such as Hybrid Formz, Psalms, Rebelance and Pussy Cat Ballz. He has won several dance competitions throughout 2007, 2008 and 2009, and served as a back-up dancer for American rapper Vanilla Ice. Repousis had also made it through the top 100 of the 2009 season of So You Think You Can Dance Australia. He also left Justice Crew in 2011.
- Emmanuel Rodriguez, also known as E-Man, is a self-taught amateur dancer from Orange, New South Wales. Rodriguez began break dancing at the age of 12 as a way to stay out of trouble and express himself. He moved to Sydney to become a B-Boy. Rodriguez has performed in several dance competitions, including the 2009 season of So You Think You Can Dance Australia, in which he placed in the final 20. Rodriguez was axed from Justice Crew in 2014, with Pearce comparing Rodriguez to '... a star (sports) player hogging the ball or wanting the spotlight'.

== Discography ==
- Live by the Words (2014)

== Tours ==
Headlining

- Dance with Me Live Tour (2011)
- Sexy and You Know It Live Tour (2012)
- #HypeTour (2014)
- Live & Local Tour (2016)
- What We Do Tour (2016)
- Pop Dat Buckle Tour (2017)
- Kick Ons Tour (2017)
- So Long Tour (2018)
- X Tour (2019)
- X Tour Part 2 (2019)

Supporting

- Chris Brown's F.A.M.E. Tour: Australian leg (2011)
- Janet Jackson's Number Ones: Up Close and Personal Tour: Australian leg (2011)
- One Direction's Up All Night Tour: Australian leg (2012)
- Pitbull's Planet Pit World Tour: Australian leg (2012)
- Jay Sean's I'm All Yours Tour : Australian leg (2012)
- Reece Mastin's Summer Nights Tour: Australian leg (2012–13)
- Pitbull and Kesha's North American Tour (2013)

== Awards and nominations ==
Year	Type	Award	Result
2011	Nickelodeon Australian Kids' Choice Awards	Aussie Musos	Nominated
2011	ARIA Music Awards	Most Popular Australian Artist	Nominated
2011	ARIA Music Awards	Most Popular Australian Live Artist	Nominated
2011	Poprepublic.tv IT List Awards	Favourite Australian Group	Nominated
2012	ARIA No. 1 Chart Awards	Number One Single ("Boom Boom")	Nominated
2012	ARIA Music Awards	Song of the Year ("Boom Boom")	Nominated
2012	Channel [V] Awards	[V] Oz Artist of the Year	Nominated
2013	ARIA Music Awards	Song of the Year ("Best Night")	Nominated
2013	ARIA Music Awards	Best Video ("Best Night")	Nominated
2013	Channel [V] Awards	[V] Oz Artist of the Year	Nominated
2013	Poprepublic.tv Awards	Favourite Australian Group	Nominated
2014	ARIA No. 1 Chart Awards	Number One Single ("Que Sera")	Nominated
2014	World Music Awards	World's Best Group	Nominated
2014	World Music Awards	World's Best Live Act	Nominated
2014	World Music Awards	World's Best Entertainer of the Year	Nominated
2014	World Music Awards	World's Best Song ("Everybody")	Nominated
2014	Channel [V] Awards	[V] Oz Artist of the Year	Nominated
2014	MTV Europe Music Awards	Best Australia Act	Nominated
2014	ARIA Music Awards	Song of the Year ("Que Sera")	Nominated
2014	ARIA Music Awards	Best Pop Release ("Que Sera")	Nominated
2014	ARIA Music Awards	Best Video ("Que Sera")	Nominated

Awards and achievements
Preceded by Mark Vincent	Winner of Australia's Got Talent; 2010	Succeeded by Jack Vidgen
Preceded by Havana Brown with "We Run the Night"	ABU TV Song Festival; 2013 with "Boom Boom" and "Everybody" _{Mashup}	Succeeded by Dami Im with "Living Dangerously"
