= Dance on Sunset =

- Genre: Reality
- Created by: Bryan Leder and Frederick Levy
- Developed by: Dan Cutforth and Jane Lipsitz
- Directed by: Paul Casey
- Starring: Quddus; Tony Testa; Karen Chuang; Johnny Erasme; Ashley Galvan; Shane Harper; Aubree Storm; Hefa Tuita
- Theme music composer: Cotrell Qualls and Jamie Newman
- Opening theme: Move by Menudo
- Country of origin: United States
- Original language: English
- No. of seasons: 1
- No. of episodes: 12

Production
- Executive producers: Dan Cutforth; Jane Lipsitz; Bryan Leder; Frederick Levy; Kay O'Connel
- Production location: Nickelodeon on Sunset in Hollywood, California
- Cinematography: Diane Biederbeck; Terry Clark; Suzanne Ebner; Malkuth Frahm; Ryan Jordan; Kosta Kristic; Ken Patterson; Wade Samul; Damien Tuffereau
- Camera setup: Multi-camera
- Running time: 30 minutes
- Production companies: Magical Elves; Nickelodeon Productions

Original release
- Network: Nickelodeon
- Release: March 29 – June 21, 2008

Dance on Sunset is an American dance and music series hosted by Quddus (Benjamin Quddus Philippe) on Nickelodeon that featured dance routines, called the "Fresh-Squeezed Dance", designed to be performed by its preteen and teenage viewers. Choreographer Tony Testa and the show's dance troupe, the Nick 6, demonstrated each routine slowly, repeating it several times during the episode. An "advanced" version of each routine was featured on the show's website. Episodes featured musical guests, which included Akon, Natasha Bedingfield, Miranda Cosgrove, Fall Out Boy, Fergie, Janet Jackson, Sean Kingston, Lil' Mama, Jesse McCartney, Menudo, Omarion, Panic! at the Disco and Ashlee Simpson, as well as dancing by a studio audience. The show premiered on March 29, 2008, immediately after the 2008 Kids' Choice Awards. The name 'On Sunset' came from the production location Nickelodeon on Sunset on Sunset Boulevard in Hollywood. The show was canceled due to low viewership. The series finale aired on June 21, 2008. The website has been discontinued & shut down as of December 21, 2017.

== Dancers ==
Members of the show's dance troupe, at the time of the show's debut, ranged in age from 15 to 22. They were directed by Tony Testa, a former choreographer of Janet Jackson. The group consisted of Karen Chuang, Johnny Erasme, Ashley Galvan, Shane Harper, Aubree Storm and Hefa Tuita; the group was chosen with an eye for diversity and differing backgrounds.

=== Karen Chuang ===
Karen Chuang was born on March 26, 1990, in San Jose, California. She graduated summa cum laude with a B.A. in business economics from UCLA, where she was the executive director for its premiere hip-hop team, NSU Modern. She is now pursuing a career as a professional dancer and is represented by Clear Talent Group. Her credits include Grey's Anatomy, Glee, The White House, The Ellen Show, Willow Smith, Cher Lloyd, and Nicki Minaj's "Pink Friday Reloaded" World Tour (2013). She has danced alongside Lady Gaga at the 2013 MTV VMAs and in her "G.U.Y." music video, and performed with Kanye West on his "Yeezus" Tour (2014). She is also a member of Entity Contemporary Dance Company. Karen's technical background and diverse training create a unique hip-hop-inspired contemporary style, which she enjoys exploring and sharing with fellow dancers. She currently subs regularly at Edge Performing Arts Center in Los Angeles, California, and Movement Lifestyle in North Hollywood, California. In addition to her artistic aspirations, Karen also has a passion for fashion and was an assistant to the PR Coordinator at Versace from 2011 to 2012. From 2023-2024, she became a backup dancer for Taylor Swift's The Eras Tour.

=== Johnny Erasme ===
Johnny Erasme was born May 11, 1989, in Fort Lauderdale, Florida. A former member of the JammX Kids, he appeared in the JCPenney commercial "Control Freak." His family moved from New Orleans, Louisiana, to California after Hurricane Katrina. He raps and plays guitar and has released a CD titled "Johnny E.".

=== Ashley Galvan ===
Ashley Galvan is a high-school senior at the debut of "Dance on Sunset". She was born on June 26, 1990 in Visalia, California. She started dancing at 3 and is schooled in jazz, ballet, tap, lyrical, contemporary, and modern dance. She received the 2007 Cover Girl Award 2007 for "Spotlight Dance Cup Comp". She has appeared in a Keke Palmer dance video, on the CBS KEWLopolis dancing competition "Dance Revolution" and in commercials and was also a background dancer in the remake of the movie Fame. She even competed on season 7 of So You Think You Can Dance as one of the top 11 contestants. She also made an appearance in the Glee episode "Original Song" as one of the Aural Intensity singers.

=== Shane Harper ===
Shane Harper was born on February 14, 1993, in La Jolla, California. He was a principal dancer in the Disney Channel's High School Musical 2, an extra in Nickelodeon's Zoey 101. He's ventured more into acting over the years, most notably as Spencer Walsh on Good Luck Charlie.

=== Aubree Storm ===
Aubree Storm born January 4, 1986, is an Elburn, Illinois, native who trained in ballet, jazz, tap and modern dance at St. Charles School of Dance and the Lou Conte Dance Studio of Chicago. She was a dancer in Disney's "High School Musical" concert tour and was a dancer for Ashley Tisdale in appearances on "Good Morning America" and Live with Regis and Kelly, and appeared as a dancer in the film Step Brothers. She was also a member of Jin Akanishi's group of backup dancers, Jincrew, used for his concerts. She has also danced for Willow Smith, Cher Lloyd, and Justin Bieber as one of twelve dancers featured in his Believe Tour.

=== Hefa Tuita ===
Tuita was born June 18, 1991, in Spanish Fork, Utah. He was a dancer in the Disney Channel's High School Musical 2 and High School Musical 3: Senior Year appearing in various parts of the movie. He is trained in Latin and salsa dancing as well as hip-hop, jazz, ballroom international and funk. He was trained at Heart N Soul Dance Studio. He appeared in the movie Unaccompanied Minors, danced in two Taylor Vai videos and for Rihanna. He's danced with multiple recording artists including Jennifer Lopez, Janet Jackson, Usher, Kylie Minogue, and Chris Brown.

== Episodes ==
Episodes broadcast have included the following. Each features a playlist of five songs and usually includes at least one special guest. Each also features a new "Fresh-Squeezed Dance."

| No. | Title | Original release date | Prod. code |
|---|---|---|---|
| 1 | "The Very First One" | March 29, 2008 | 101 |
Playlist; *5 Timbaland: Give It to Me; *4 Fall Out Boy: Thnks fr th Mmrs; *3 Paramore: Misery Business; *2 Justice: D.A.N.C.E. *1 Mary J. Blige: Just Fine Fresh-Squeezed Dance: The Rowboat
| 2 | "Stronger" | April 6, 2008 | 102 |
Playlist; *5 Rihanna: Don't Stop the Music; *4 Avril Lavigne: Girlfriend; *3 Sean Kingston: Beautiful Girls; *2 Natasha Bedingfield: Pocketful of Sunshine; *1 Kanye West featuring Daft Punk: Stronger; Fresh-Squeezed Dance:The Fly Swatter Musical Guest: Natasha Bedingfield
| 3 | "Deja" | April 13, 2008 | 103 |
Playlist; *5 Beyoncé Knowles: Déjà Vu; *4 Fall Out Boy: Dance, Dance; *3 Panic! at the Disco: Nine in the Afternoon; *2 Tiffany Evans: I'm Grown; *1 Gwen Stefani: Now That You Got It; Fresh-Squeezed Dance:The Sweat Hop Musical Guest: Fall Out Boy
| 4 | "Balloons JD" | April 20, 2008 | 104 |
Playlist; *5 Chris Brown: Wall to Wall; *4 The Naked Brothers Band: I Don't Want to Go to School; *3 Madonna: Vogue; *2 Ashlee Simpson: Little Miss Obsessive; *1 Fergie: Clumsy; Fresh-Squeezed Dance: The Sunset Shuffle Musical Guest: The Naked Brothers Band and Ashlee Simpson
| 5 | "Flipping for Akon" | April 27, 2008 | 105 |
Playlist *5 B5 featuring Bow Wow: Hydrolics; *4 Lil' Mama: G-Slide (Tour Bus); *3 Miranda Cosgrove featuring Drake Bell: Leave It All to Me; *2 Colby O'Donis featuring Akon: What You Got; *1 OneRepublic featuring Timbaland: Apologize; Fresh-Squeezed Dance: Rebel Rock Musical Guest: Colby O'Donis and Akon
| 6 | "Fergalicious" | May 4, 2008 | 106 |
Playlist; *5 Justin Timberlake featuring T.I.: My Love; *4 Fergie: Glamorous; *3 C+C Music Factory: Gonna Make You Sweat (Everybody Dance Now); *2 Fergie: Finally; *1 Collective Soul: Hollywood; Fresh-Squeezed Dance: Funkylicious Musical Guest: Fergie
| 7 | "Move" | May 10, 2008 | 107 |
Playlist; *5 Lil' Mama featuring Chris Brown & T-Pain: Shawty Get Loose; *4 Ciara featuring Missy Elliott: 1,2 Step; *3 Simple Plan: When I'm Gone; *2 Menudo: Lost; *1 Ashlee Simpson: Outta My Head (Ay Ya Ya); Fresh-Squeezed Dance: Boyband Breakdown Musical Guest: Menudo
| 8 | "Panic at Sunset" | May 17, 2008 | 108 |
Playlist; *5 Madonna featuring Justin Timberlake & Timbaland: 4 Minutes; *4 Pink: Get the Party Started; *3 Diddy: Tell Me; *2 Panic! at the Disco: Nine in the Afternoon; *1 Keyshia Cole featuring Missy Elliott & Lil' Kim: Let It Go; Fresh-Squeezed Dance: Bump, Jump and Thump Musical Guest: Panic! at the Disco
| 9 | "Prom" | May 24, 2008 | 109 |
Playlist; *5 Kool & the Gang: Celebration; *4 Tiffany Evans featuring Ciara: Promise Ring; *3 Angels & Airwaves: Everything's Magic; *2 Jesse McCartney: Leavin'; *1 Omarion: Entourage; Fresh-Squeezed Dance: Prom Romp Musical Guest: Jesse McCartney, Miranda Cosgrove
| 10 | "Girl Group Dance-Off" | May 31, 2008 | 110 |
Playlist; *5 Chris Brown featuring T-Pain: Kiss Kiss; *4 We the Kings: Skyway Avenue; *3 Kat Deluna featuring Busta Rhymes: Run The Show; *2 Soulja Boy Tell 'Em featuring Arab: Yahhh! *1 Jennifer Lopez: Hold It Don't Drop It; Fresh-Squeezed Dance: Boot Scooch Musical Guest: Soulja Boy Tell 'Em, Clique Girlz
| 11 | "Finally Janet" | June 14, 2008 | 111 |
Playlist; *5 Beyoncé: Upgrade U *4 Paramore: Crushcrushcrush; *3 Colby O'Donis featuring Akon: What You Got; *2 Usher: U Don't Have To Call; *1 Janet Jackson: Rhythm Nation; Fresh-Squeezed Dance: The Double J Musical Guest: Janet Jackson
| 12 | "Kingston of Summer" | June 21, 2008 | 112 |
Playlist; *5 Gwen Stefani featuring Akon: The Sweet Escape; *4 The D.E.Y.: Give You the World; *3 Nelly featuring Fergie: Party People; *2 Sean Kingston featuring Élan: There's Nothin; *1 Vampire Weekend: A-Punk; Fresh-Squeezed Dance: Slide and Glide Musical Guest: Mario, Sean Kingston, Élan, and The D.E.Y.

== International distribution ==
- Premiered in Australia and New Zealand on April 13, 2008, on Nickelodeon.
- Premiered in Canada on YTV on May 18, 2008, at 8:00 P.M. ET after the 2008 Kids' Choice Awards.
- Premiered in South East Asia on March 9, 2009, on Nickelodeon South East Asia part of Nick at Nite.

| Preceded by SpongeBob SquarePants; 2007 | Kids' Choice Awards lead-out program Dance on Sunset; 2008 | Succeeded by The Penguins of Madagascar; 2009 |
