= Tiffany Evans discography =

American singer-songwriter

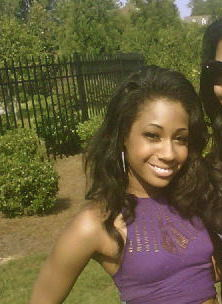
- Studio albums: 1
- EPs: 3
- Singles: 14
- Music videos: 12

American singer and songwriter Tiffany Evans has released one studio album, three extended plays/mixtapes, thirteen singles and twelve music videos. Evans appeared on Star Search in February 2003, where she won the Grand Champion title in junior singer division. She competed against fellow singers Lisa Tucker and David Archuleta, who both later appeared on American Idol. In the same year she signed to Columbia Records.

In 2004, Tiffany released her debut self-titled EP Tiffany Evans. The EP featured eight tracks on CD (all covers) and a special bonus DVD. Its main single "Let Me Be Your Angel" (originally recorded by Stacy Lattisaw) was released on September 7, 2004, along with a music video. The song debuted at number 95 on the Billboard Hot 100. She released her self-titled debut album in April 2008. It featured her most successful single to date, "Promise Ring" (featuring Ciara), as well as "I'm Grown" (featuring Bow Wow). The album peaked at number four on the US Top Heatseekers chart. The third single from the album, "Lay Back & Chill" was planned, but Evans instead started to work on her second album.

In 2010, she released new single, entitled "I'll Be There" from her unreleased second album Pefrect Imperfection. In the same year, she left Columbia and started her own independent record label Little Lady Entertainment (later renamed as Live Love Entertainment). In 2012, she announced new project and released two singles: "U Got a Woman" and "If You Love Me".

On February 12, 2013 she released new EP/mixtape titled 143, produced by Sak Pase, B.Fre$h, Elijah Blake, Watch the Duck, Maad Scientist and Trak Girl. On November 3, 2014 she released new single "Baby Don't Go", which debuted at number three on Billboard's Trending 140 chart. Her third EP, All Me, was released in October 2015.

== Studio albums ==
List of studio albums, with selected chart positions
Title	Album details	Chart positions		
Title	Album details	US	US R&B	US Heat.
Tiffany Evans	Released: April 22, 2008; Label: Columbia; Format: CD, digital download	134	20	4

== EPs ==
List of extended plays, with selected details
Title	EP details
Tiffany Evans	Released: October 12, 2004; Label: Columbia; Format: CD, digital download
143	Released: February 12, 2013; Label: Little Lady Entertainment; Format: Digital download
All Me	Released: October 30, 2015; Label: Live Love Entertainment; Format: Digital download

== Singles ==
List of singles, with selected chart positions
Title	Year	Chart positions		Album
Title	Year	US	US R&B	Album
"Let Me Be Your Angel"	2004	95	—	Tiffany Evans EP
"Thinkin' About"	2005	—	—	Tiffany Evans
"Who I Am"	2006	—	—	Tiffany Evans
"Promise Ring" (featuring Ciara)	2007	101	66	Tiffany Evans
"I'm Grown" (featuring Bow Wow)	2008	—	99	Tiffany Evans
"I'll Be There" (Note: "I'll Be There" also reached number 15 on the Hot Dance Club Play chart.)	2010	—	61	Non-album single
"U Got a Woman"	2012	—	—	143
"If You Love Me"	2012	—	—	143
"Baby Don't Go"	2014	—	—	Non-album singles
"Red Wine"	2015	—	—	Non-album singles
"On Sight" (featuring Fetty Wap)	2015	—	—	All Me
"Switch Up"	2018	—	—	Non-album singles
"Merry Go Round"	2019	—	—	Non-album singles
"Bag Talk" (with Tony Stogie)	2023	—	—	Swarovski
"Reset"	2024	—	—	TBA

== Music videos ==
Title	Year	Director(s)
"Let Me Be Your Angel"	2004	—
"Who Am I?" (From Disney's "Tarzan II")	2005	—
"Promise Ring" (with Ciara)	2007	Fat Cats
"I'm Grown" (with Bow Wow)	2008	Rock Jacobs
"I'll Be There"	2010	Adam Tillman-Young
"Won't Find Me"	2011	Tiffany Evans & Sean Bankhead
"Move That Dope (Remix)"	2014	Tiffany Evans
"Baby Don't Go"	2014	Tiffany Evans & Lorenzo Henderson
"On Sight" (with Fetty Wap)	2015	Tiffany Evans
"All I Want"	2017	Tiffany Evans
"Switch Up"	2019	Tiffany Evans
"Merry Go Round"	2019	Tiffany Evans
"Finally" (with Jawan)	2021	Sean Bankhead
"Essence (Remix)" (with Jawan)	2021	Ey3 Vision Filmz
"Patience" (with Jawan)	2022	Jawan Harris
"Reset"	2024—2025	Tiffany Evans
