= The Writing Camp =

American songwriter collective

- Origin: United States
- Genres: Pop, R&B, dance-pop, pop rock
- Years active: 2007–present
- Members: Evan "Kidd" Bogart; Erika Nuri-Taylor; David "DQ" Quiñones
- Past members: Victoria Horn; Eric Bellinger; Sonyae Elise; Greg Ogan; Shari Short
- Website: http://www.thewritingcamp.net

The Writing Camp is an American songwriting collective, founded by Evan "Kidd" Bogart and David "DQ" Quiñones. Since its formation in 2007, the team has been responsible for a series of successful releases in pop, R&B and dance music, including 2008's "Right Here (Departed)" by Brandy and Beyoncé's "Halo."

== History ==
Eventually a trio, the collective was formed in October 2007 following a writing camp throw by Bogart & Quiñones in J.R. Rotem's studio at Chalice, adding Erika Nuri to the collective shortly thereafter. A fourth member originally added, Victoria Horn, a British songwriter, left the formation soon-after joining amicably due to creative and business differences about the overall goals of The Camp. The remaining original trio has since formed The Writing Camp LLC, housing a music publishing company, music production house and music supervision company for television, film & commercials. TWC Music Publishing has signed three songwriters Greg Ogan, Shari Short & Eric Bellinger, through their joint-venture with Sony ATV Music Publishing.

The 2011 Bravo series Platinum Hit was an elimination competition series featuring undiscovered singer-songwriters where talented newcomers battle through a series of innovative songwriting challenges to find out who's ready for the top of the pop charts. In each episode, the winning song will be revealed in a performance by a special guest star, some of the hottest singers today. True Entertainment (“The Real Housewives of Atlanta”) developed the reality series for Bravo with Steven Weinstock, Glenda Hersh, Tim Bogart, Evan Bogart, David Quinones and Erika Nuri serving as executive producers. The Writing Camp is also a producer.

== Members ==
- Evan "Kidd" Bogart, the son of legendary Casablanca Records founder Neil Bogart, began rapping before transitioning into corporate gigs at Interscope and Warner Bros. Records, BAT Management, Casbah Artists Management, and Agency for the Performing Arts, where he aided in the discovery and development of Eminem, Maroon 5 and OneRepublic, among others. When his co-written "SOS", recorded by Rihanna, became a worldwide smash, Bogart returned to the creative side where he has since penned songs for everyone from Beyoncé to Leona Lewis.
- New York-born Erika Nuri spent formative creative time in the musical R&B hotbed of Atlanta before relocating to Los Angeles, signing a co-publishing deal with Kenneth "Babyface" Edmonds' company and garnering cuts with K-Ci & JoJo, Chingy (featuring Janet Jackson), B2K, Yasmeen and penning "Fatal" for J. Holiday. After a brief hiatus from the business, Nuri rebounded with an eight-week number 1 Billboard hit, the two-time Grammy nominated "When I See U" performed by American Idol champ Fantasia.
- David "DQ" Quinones was raised in the Washington, DC suburb of Sterling, VA. He attended Shenandoah Conservatory for music education and opera studies before entering Berklee College of Music with a focus on music production and engineering. His studio résumé in vocal production and arrangements is extensive and DQ has consistently "wowed" the likes of Rodney "Darkchild" Jerkins, J.R. Rotem, Ryan Tedder and Midi Mafia, to name a few. DQ's has written most notably for Beyoncé, Brandy, Pussycat Dolls and Enrique Iglesias
- Boston native Greg Ogan signed with TWC Music Publishing/Sony ATV Music LLC in November 2009. He graduated Berklee College of Music with a focus on music production and engineering where he attended with TWC co-founder David "DQ" Quinones. Ogan spent over 2 years as the head engineer for J.R. Rotem's Beluga Heights where he worked closely with TWC co-founder Evan "Kidd" Bogart". While at Beluga Heights, Ogan worked on albums by Britney Spears, Leona Lewis, Rihanna, Natasha Bedingfield and Sean Kingston, among others. Ogan vocal-produced the majority of Kingston's sophomore release "Tomorrow".
- Los Angeles born and bred singer-songwriter Eric Bellinger signed with TWC Music Publishing/Sony ATV Music LLC in mid-2010. Grandson of Jackson 5 hit making songwriter Bobby Day (Rockin’ Robin, Little Bitty Pretty One), Bellinger has been singing since he could speak. Eric Bellinger is an all-star talent who, in his young career, has already written for the likes of Chris Brown, Chipmunk, Greyson Chance, John Brown, Cali Swag District and Selena Gomez & The Scene.
- Singer/Songwriter Shari Short (former Miss Teen Idaho) moved from Idaho to Los Angeles several years ago to pursue her dream as an artist and songwriter. She signed with TWC Music Publishing/Sony ATV Music LLC in early-2010. Shari has had songs placed on Desperate Housewives, Grey's Anatomy, and got her first cut as a songwriter on the Hannah Montana soundtrack. She has written with artists such as Joe Jonas, Matthew Morrison and co-wrote the theme song with Jessica Simpson & TWC's Bogart for Simpson's television show "Price of Beauty" on VH1.
- New Jersey native Sonyae Elise grew up in a musical family being with her mother in the recording studio often. In 2011, Elise took part in the television series Platinum Hit and ultimately won the competition. As a part of her prize she won a publishing deal with The Writing Camp.

== Discography ==
=== Singles ===
==== As songwriter ====
- 2004: "Don't Worry" Chingy featuring Janet Jackson
- 2006: "SOS" (Rihanna) - #1 on Billboard Hot 100 for 4 weeks
- 2007: "When I See U" (Fantasia) - #1 on Billboard Hot R&B/Hip Hops Songs for several weeks
- 2007: "Fuego" (The Cheetah Girls)
- 2007/2008: "He Said She Said" (Ashley Tisdale) - #1 on MTV for 16 weeks
- 2007/2008: "Take You There" (Sean Kingston) - Top 10 on Billboard Hot 100 for 7 weeks
- 2008: "Homegirlz" (Lala)
- 2008: "Give You the World" (The D.E.Y.)
- 2008: "There's Nothin' (Remix)" (Sean Kingston featuring Elan & Juelz Santana)
- 2008: "Karma" (NLT)
- 2008: "Future Love" (Varsity Fanclub)
- 2008: "Too Good for Me" (Rigo Luna)
- 2008: "Right Here (Departed)" (Brandy) - #1 on Billboard Dance Chart
- 2008: "Reach Out" (Hilary Duff) - #1 on Billboard Dance Chart
- 2009: "Halo" (Beyoncé) - Top 10 on Billboard Hot 100 for 8 weeks, #1 on UK Radio for 5 weeks
- 2009: "Jai Ho! (You Are My Destiny)" (The Pussycat Dolls) from Slumdog Millionaire
- 2009: "Sabotage" (Kristinia Debarge)
- 2009: "Happy" (Leona Lewis)
- 2009: "Future Love" (Kristinia Debarge)
- 2010: "Automatik" (Livvi Franc)
- 2010: "The Sky's the Limit" (Jason DeRulo)
- 2010: "Waiting Outside the Lines" (Greyson Chance)
- 2010/2011: "Friday to Sunday" (Justice Crew)
- 2010/2011: "Champion" (Chipmunk featuring Chris Brown)
- 2010/2011: "Tonight Tonight" (Hot Chelle Rae)

=== Other credited songs ===
3LW - Love Don't Cost a Thing - Soundtrack

- 14. "Hate 2 Love U"

Adam Lambert - For Your Entertainment

- 13. "Broken Open"
- 15. "Down the Rabbit Hole" (iTunes bonus track)

Ashley Tisdale - Headstrong

- 03. "He Said She Said"

B2K - "Pandemonium!"

- 10. "Would You Be Here"

Babyface - Face2Face

- 12. "Don't Take It So Personal"

Namie Amuro - FEEL

- 01. "Alive"

Beyoncé - I Am... Sasha Fierce

- 02. "Halo" - 2010 Grammy Nominated for "Record of the Year" & "Best Female Pop Vocal Performance"
- 06. "Hello"

Big Time Rush - BTR

- 10. "I Know U Know" - Featuring Cymphonique

Blake Lewis - A.D.D. (Audio Day Dream)

- 06. "Surrender"

Brandy - Human

- 00. "Right Here (Departed)

Britney Spears - Blackout

- 15. "Everybody" - Bonus Track

Calvin Richardson - Bringing Down the House - Soundtrack

- 08. "Next to You"

The Cheetah Girls - TCG

- 01. "Fuego"
- 07. "Do No Wrong"

Chingy - Powerballin'

- 09. "Don't Worry" featuring Janet Jackson

Chipmunk - Transition

- 00. "Champion" featuring Chris Brown

The D.E.Y. - The DEY Has Come EP

- 02. "Give You the World"
- 08. "Dame Un Memento"

Demi Lovato - Here We Go Again

- 08. "Got Dynamite"

Donna Summer - Crayons

- 02. "Mr. Music"
- 04. "The Queen Is Back"

Enrique Iglesias - Euphoria

- 04. "Dirty Dancer" featuring Usher
- 05. "Why Not Me?"

Fantasia - Fantasia

- 02. "When I See U"

Governor - Son of Pain

- 04. "Be Yourself"

Greyson Chance - Hold On 'til the Night

- 00. "Waiting Outside the Lines"

Heidi Montag - TBD

- 00. "Body Language"

Hilary Duff - Best of Hilary Duff

- 01. "Reach Out"

J. Holiday - Back of My Lac'

- 10. "Fatal"

Jada (band) - "TBD"

- 00."I'm That Chick" (also featured on the soundtrack to Bring It On: In It to Win It)

Jason Derülo - Jason Derülo

- 04. "The Sky's the Limit"
- 07. "Fallen"
- 08. "Encore"

Jennifer Lopez - Brave

- 01. "Stay Together"

Jennifer Lopez - Love?

- 14. "Until It Beats No More"

Jesse McCartney - Departure

- 07. "My Baby"

Jessi Malay - TBD

- 00. "Gimme" featuring Lil Scrappy
- 00. "Draw the Line"

Jessica Simpson - VH1's The Price of Beauty

- 00. "Who We Are" (theme song)

Justice Crew - TBD

- 00. "Friday to Sunday"

K-Ci & JoJo - "X"

- 08. "All the Things I Should Have Known"

Keke Palmer - "So Uncool"

- 07. "Footworkin'" also listed as "Footwurkin'"

Keyshia Cole - "A Different Me"

- 12. "This Is Us"

Kristinia Debarge - "Exposed"

- 02. "Future Love"
- 03. "Speak Up"
- 05. "Sabotage"

LaLa - "American Mija"

- 00. "Homegirlz"

Leona Lewis - "Echo"

- 01. "Happy"
- 14. "Stone Hearts & Hand Grenades" (Hidden Track & Amazon Exclusive bonus track)

Livvi Franc - "TBD"

- 00. "Automatik"

Lucy Walsh - "Lost in the Lights"

- 01. "Crash"
- 07. "Tell Her"
- 08. "Guilty"

M. Pokora - "MP3"

- 05. "Treason"

Melissa Schuman - "Love Don't Cost A Thing - Soundtrack"

- 10. "Always"

NLT - Not Like Them

- 00. "Karma"

No Angels - "Welcome to the Dance"

- 07. "Shut Your Mouth"
- 08. "Up Against the Wall"

Paris Hilton - "Paris"

- 04. "I Want You"

Pussycat Dolls - TBD

- 00. "Top of the World" - MTV's "The City" Theme Song
- 00. "Jai Ho! (You Are My Destiny)" - from Slumdog Millionaire

Rigo Luna - "TBD"

- 00. "Too Good for Me"

Rihanna - "A Girl Like Me"

- 01. "SOS"

Sarah Connor - "Sexy as Hell"

- 10. "Fall Apart"

Sean Kingston - "Sean Kingston"

- 02. "Take You There"
- 06. "Dry Your Eyes"
- 08. "There's Nothin" featuring Paula DeAnda
- 11. "Your Sister"
- 00. "There's Nothin' (Remix)" featuring Elan from The D.E.Y. and Juelz Santana

Tony Rich - "Words"

- 05. "Ghost"

Varsity Fanclub - "TBD"

- 00. "Future Love"
- 00. "Lost Then Found"

Xscape - "Off the Hook"

- 12. "Keep It on the Real"

== Awards ==
- 01. BMI Billboard #1's Award for "SOS" performed by Rihanna
- 02. BMI Pop Award Top Songs of 2006 for "SOS" performed by Rihanna
- 03. Two Grammy Nominations for "When I See U" by Fantasia for Best Female R&B Vocal Performance and Best R&B Song at the 50th Grammy Awards in 2008
- 04. ASCAP 2007 Rhythm & Soul Music Award and Honoree for “When I See U” by Fantasia
- 05. BMI Pop Award Top Songs of 2008 for "Take You There" performed by Sean Kingston
- 06. Best Song "Halo" at the 2009 MTV Europe Music Awards
- 07. BMI Pop Award Top Songs of 2009 for "Halo" performed by Beyoncé
- 08. Grammy Award winning song "Halo" for Best Female Pop Vocal Performance 2010
- 09. Grammy Nominated song "Halo" for Record of the Year 2010
- 10. Grammy Nominated song "Halo (Live)" for Best Female Pop Vocal Performance 2011
