= Shea Taylor =

American songwriter, producer, multi-instrumentalist

Robert "Shea" Taylor is an American songwriter, producer, multi-instrumentalist based in New York City. He established an early successful songwriting partnership with Def Jam's R&B singer-songwriter phenom Ne-Yo, and has also worked with Rihanna, Beyoncé, Ariana Grande, Janet Jackson, Chris Brown, and Wyclef Jean.

Taylor has songwriting credits on seven tracks from Beyonce's fourth studio album, 4 (2011). The album was a commercial success; earning a platinum certification in the US, and debuting atop the US Billboard 200 chart, with first-week sales of over 300,000. "Love on Top" topped the US Hot R&B/Hip-Hop Songs chart and Adult R&B Airplay chart in March 2012. "Run the World (Girls)" also reached number one on the US Hot Dance Club Songs and is certified Gold in the US and New Zealand, as well as Platinum in Australia and Canada. "Best Thing I Never Had" climbed to the top of Nielsen's Urban airplay chart in September and peaked at number four on the Hot R&B/Hip-Hop Songs chart.

Taylor co-wrote the lead single "Thinkin Bout You" and "Pilot Jones" on Frank Ocean's debut studio album Channel Orange (2012). The album debuted atop on the US Billboard R&B/Hip-Hop Albums chart and number two on the UK R&B Albums chart. It also debuted at number two on the Billboard 200.

Shea is published by Downtown Music Publishing.

== Production and writing credits ==
All credits are sourced from Allmusic and Discogs.

| Date | Artist | Song | Album | Label |
|---|---|---|---|---|
| 2005 | Chris Brown | "Thank You" | Chris Brown | Jive |
| 2006 | Ne-Yo | "When You're Mad" | In My Own Words | Def Jam |
| 2006 | Ne-Yo | "Mirror" | In My Own Words | Def Jam |
| 2006 | Beyoncé | "Flaws and All" | B'Day | Columbia |
| 2006 | LL Cool J | "It's LL and Santana" | Todd Smith | Def Jam |
| 2006 | Paula DeAnda | "When It Was Me" | Paula DeAnda | Arista |
| 2007 | Ne-Yo | "Addicted" | Because of You | Def Jam |
| 2007 | Ne-Yo | 'Sex with My Ex" | Because of You | Def Jam |
| 2007 | Ne-Yo | "Make It Work" | Because of You | Def Jam |
| 2007 | Ne-Yo | "That's What It Does" | Because of You | Def Jam |
| 2007 | Collie Buddz | "She's Lonely" | Collie Buddz | Columbia/Sony BMG |
| 2007 | B5 | "In My Bedroom" | Don't Talk, Just Listen | Bad Boy/Sony BMG |
| 2007 | Rihanna | "Question Existing" | Good Girl Gone Bad | Def Jam |
| 2007 | Kevin Michael | "Can't Get Enuff" | Kevin Michael | Atlantic |
| 2008 | Solange Knowles | "I Told You So" | Sol-Angel and the Hadley St. Dreams | Geffen |
| 2008 | Solange Knowles | "White Picket Dreams" | Sol-Angel and the Hadley St. Dreams | Geffen |
| 2008 | Brutha | "Just Being Honest" | Brutha | Def Jam |
| 2008 | Kardinal Offishall | "Burnt" | Not 4 Sale | Geffen |
| 2008 | Janet Jackson | "Discipline" | Discipline | Island |
| 2008 | Tiffany Evans | "Impossible" | Tiffany Evans | Columbia |
| 2008 | Ne-Yo | "Lie to Me" | Year of the Gentleman | Def Jam |
| 2011 | Beyoncé | "I Miss You" | 4 | Parkwood Entertainment/Columbia |
| 2011 | Beyoncé | "Best Thing I Never Had" | 4 | Parkwood Entertainment/Columbia |
| 2011 | Beyoncé | "Start Over" | 4 | Parkwood Entertainment/Columbia |
| 2011 | Beyoncé | "Love On Top" | 4 | Parkwood Entertainment/Columbia |
| 2011 | Beyoncé | "Countdown" | 4 | Parkwood Entertainment/Columbia |
| 2011 | Beyoncé | "End of Time" | 4 | Parkwood Entertainment/Columbia |
| 2011 | Beyoncé | "Lay Up Under Me" | 4 | Parkwood Entertainment/Columbia |
| 2011 | Beyoncé | "Schoolin' Life" | 4 | Parkwood Entertainment/Columbia |
| 2011 | Hugo | "Rock N' Roll Delight" | Old Tyme Religion | Roc Nation |
| 2012 | Frank Ocean | "Thinkin Bout You" | Channel Orange | Def Jam |
| 2012 | Frank Ocean | "Pilot Jones" | Channel Orange | Def Jam |
| 2012 | Rita Ora | "Uneasy" | Ora | Roc Nation |
| 2012 | Ne-Yo | "Cracks In Mr. Perfect" | R.E.D. | Motown |
| 2012 | Ne-Yo | "Lazy Love" | R.E.D. | Motown |
| 2012 | Ne-Yo | "Stress Reliever" | R.E.D. | Motown |
| 2013 | Chrisette Michele | "Be In Love" | Better | Universal Motown/Def Jam |
| 2013 | Bridget Kelly featuring Kendrick Lamar | "Street Dreamin'" | Non-album single | Roc Nation |
| 2013 | Stefano Langone | "Yes to Love" | TBA | Hollywood |
| 2014 | K. Michelle | "Love 'Em All" | Anybody Wanna Buy a Heart? | Atlantic |
| 2014 | Daley | "Blame the World" | Alone Together and Days + Nights | Polydor/Republic |
| 2015 | Lianne La Havas | "Midnight" | Blood | Warner Bros. |
| 2015 | Ne-Yo | "Good Morning" | Non-Fiction | Motown |
| 2015 | Ne-Yo | "She Said I'm Hood Tho" | Non-Fiction | Motown |
| 2015 | Ne-Yo | "Story Time" | Non-Fiction | Motown |
| 2016 | Rihanna | "James Joint" | Anti | Roc Nation |
| 2018 | Mariah Carey | "A No No" | Caution | Epic |
| 2020 | Mac Miller | "I Can See" | Circles | REMember Music/Warner |
| 2020 | Alina Baraz | "Say You Know" | It Was Divine | Mom + Pop |
| 2020 | Ariana Grande | "Just Like Magic" | Positions | Republic |
| 2020 | Ariana Grande | "Six Thirty" | Positions | Republic |
| 2021 | Maddie Ziegler | "Best Friend (You and Me for Life)" | Music | Atlantic |
