= J. Que =

American record producer and songwriter

J.Que
- Born: Patrick Smith
- Genres: R&B, gospel, hip hop, soul
- Occupations: Producer, songwriter

Patrick Smith, known professionally as J.Que, is an American record producer and songwriter. He has contributed to songs from Usher, Britney Spears, Jennifer Lopez, Beyoncé, Fantasia Barrino, Ciara, Avant, Chris Brown, Ariana Grande, The Gospellers, Omarion, and P1Harmony.

Born in North Carolina he was raised in Anniston, Alabama. Smith has a son (Channing) and a daughter (Riley) with his wife Vivian.

== Songs produced, written, or vocal-arranged ==
Year	Song title	Artist	Album
2000	"永遠(とわ)に"	The Gospellers	Soul Serenade
2000	"夢の外"	The Gospellers	Soul Serenade
2001	"約束の季節"	The Gospellers	FRENZY
2002	"誓い"	The Gospellers	FRENZY
2002	"Body Calling"	The Gospellers	FRENZY
2002	"DAWN〜夜明け〜"	The Gospellers	FRENZY
2002	"Hush Lil' Lady"	Lil' Corey featuring Lil' Romeo	I'm Just Corey
2003	"That Girl"	Marques Houston	MH
2004	"Yeah!"	Usher	Confessions
2004	"Throwback"	Usher	Confessions
2004	"Truth Is"	Fantasia	Free Yourself
2005	"Sposed to Be"	Toni Braxton	Libra
2005	"Free Style"	Daichi Miura	D-ROCK with U
2006	"4 Minutes"	Avant	Director
2006	"Like a Boy"	Ciara	Ciara: The Evolution
2006	"Ice Box"	Omarion	21
2007	"Promise Ring"	Tiffany Evans	Tiffany Evans
2007	"Girl Gone Wild"	Tiffany Evans	Tiffany Evans
2007	"Hate2LoveU"	Amerie	Because I Love It
2007	"Forever"	Jennifer Lopez	Brave
2007	"Wrong When You're Gone"	Jennifer Lopez	Brave
2007	"Brave"	Jennifer Lopez	Brave
2007	"Radar"	Britney Spears	Blackout
2007	"Freakshow"	Britney Spears	Blackout
2007	"No Definition"	Mario	Go
2009	"Long Gone"	Chris Cornell	Scream
2011	"Best Thing I Never Had"	Beyoncé	4
2011	"Dreaming" (Japan only)	Beyoncé	4
2013	"Baby I"	Ariana Grande	Yours Truly
2016	"Testify"	Nick Jonas	Last Year Was Complicated
2017	"Limitless"	NCT 127	Limitless
2018	"ヒカリ"	The Gospellers	What The World Needs Now
2018	"In This Room"	The Gospellers	What The World Needs Now
2018	"Right by you"	The Gospellers	What The World Needs Now
2018	"Goodbye"	The Gospellers	What The World Needs Now
2018	"for U"	The Gospellers	What The World Needs Now
2018	"DON'T LEAVE ME NOW"	The Gospellers	What The World Needs Now
2018	"Cherry Bomb" (English Version)	NCT 127	Cherry Bomb (EP)
2021	"Make Up"	SixTONES	マスカラ
2021	"War With Heaven"	keshi	Shang-Chi and the Legend of the Ten Rings: The Album
2022	"Die For You"	Joji	Smithereens
2022	"Back Down"	P1Harmony	Harmony: Set In
2024	"Domino"	SF9	Sequence
2024	"Killin' It" (때깔)	P1Harmony	Killin' It
2024	"Broken Heart"	Ampers&One	One Hearted
2024	"He + She = We"	Ampers&One	One Question
2026	"G.O.A.T"	Taeyang	Quintessence
2026	"4U"	Taeyang	Quintessence

== Awards ==
Smith has had 3 Grammy Nominations, 4 BET Award Noms, & 6 BMI Award
