= Rico Rossi =

Rico Rossi may refer to:

- Rico Rossi (ice hockey)
- Rico Rossi (musician)
