= Watch the Duck =

American Musical

WATCH THE DUCK
- Origin: Montgomery, Alabama, United States
- Genres: Alternative R&B
- Years active: 2012–present
- Labels: Interscope Records, I Am Other
- Members: Jesse Rankins; Eddie Smith III; Oscar White III (production partner)

Watch the Duck (WTD, stylized as WATCH THE DUCK) is an American musical duo from Montgomery, Alabama, United States. Their 2012 song, "Poppin’ Off" was added to mtvU's regular rotation. The group signed with Pharrell's i am OTHER, an imprint of Interscope Records in 2017. Their 2018 single, "There You Are" was described as "a more intimate and personal sound starring Jesse's R&B vocal" and a "feel-good record that encourages listeners to stay in the moment, and move with whatever feelings come from being in the present."

== History ==
Watch the Duck was formed by friends Eddie Smith III, Jesse Rankins, and former member Jonathan Wells. All three were DJs, producers, and musicians originally from Montgomery, Alabama but moved to Atlanta, Georgia in 2010. The name of the group comes from a phrase that they use to describe society's obsession with keeping up appearances. Smith has been quoted as saying, "Everyone sees a duck floating smoothly on top of the water, but one rarely pays attention to how hard it kicks underneath to get where it's going."

== Band members ==
Current members

- Jesse Rankins – Lead vocalist (2012–present)
- Eddie Smith III – DJ and percussion (2012–present)
- Oscar White III – Guitarist (2015–present)

Past members

- Jonathan Wells – Keyboards (2012–2015)

== Discography ==
=== EPs ===
List of extended plays, with selected details
Title	Album details
Anatidaephobia EP	Released: April 1, 2013; Label: Epic Records; Format: Digital download
The Trojan Horse EP	Released: November 20, 2015; Label: Epic Records; Format: Digital download
Delayed Adulthood (debut album)	Release Date: April 20, 2018; Label: Interscope Records; Format: Digital download

=== Singles ===
Title	Year	Album
"Poppin' Off"	2012	Anatidaephobia EP
"Making Luv to the Beat" (featuring T.I. and DJ E-Feezy)	2015	The Trojan Horse EP
"There You Are"	2018	Delayed Adulthood (forthcoming debut album)

=== Guest appearances ===
List of non-single guest appearances, with other performing artists, showing year released and album name
Title	Year	Other artist(s)	Album
"100"	2014	Iggy Azalea	The New Classic
"By Any Means (God Damnt)"	2014	T.I., Shad da God, Spodde	G.D.O.D. II
"Troubled"	2014	B.o.B, T.I.	G.D.O.D. II
"G Shit"	2014	T.I., Jeezy	Paperwork
"Light 'Em Up (RIP Doe B)"	2014	T.I., Pharrell	Paperwork
"Tell A Chic"	2013	Tiffany Evans	143 (EP)
"Big Ol Drip"	2018	T.I.	Dime Trap

== See also ==
- List of Epic Records artists
