= Doing Too Much =

Single by Paula DeAnda featuring Baby Bash

from the album Paula DeAnda
- Released: June 3, 2006
- Recorded: 2005–2006
- Length: 4:06
- Label: Arista; J
- Songwriter(s): Ronald Bryant; Paula DeAnda; Noa Angel; Nathan Perez
- Producer(s): Happy Perez

Paula DeAnda singles chronology
"Doing Too Much" (2006)	"Walk Away (Remember Me)" (2006)

Baby Bash singles chronology
"Energy" (2006)	"Doing Too Much" (2006)	"Do It Daddy" (2006)

"Doing Too Much" is the debut single released by American singer Paula DeAnda. It features Baby Bash. It reached number forty-one on the US Billboard Hot 100. The song also peaked at number nine on the Billboard Rhythmic chart. A Spanish version of the song was also released titled "Lo que hago por tu amor" ("What I Do for Your Love").

== Charts ==
=== Weekly charts ===
Weekly chart performance for "Doing Too Much"
Chart (2006)	Peak position
Canada CHR/Top 40 (Billboard)	50
US Billboard Hot 100	41
US Pop Airplay (Billboard)	20
US Rhythmic (Billboard)	9

=== Year-end charts ===
Year-end chart performance for "Doing Too Much"
Chart (2006)	Position
US Rhythmic (Billboard)	34

== Certifications and sales ==
Certifications and sales for "Doing Too Much"
Region	Certification	Certified units/sales
United States (RIAA) Mastertone	Gold	500,000^{*}
^{*} Sales figures based on certification alone.
