= Easy (Paula DeAnda song) =

Single by Paula DeAnda featuring Bow Wow

from the album Paula DeAnda
- Released: May 15, 2007
- Recorded: 2006
- Genre: Pop; dance-pop; R&B; dancehall
- Length: 3:54; 3:28 (single version)
- Label: SonyBMG, Arista
- Songwriters: Nathaniel Hills, Londell ‘Nikko’ Smith, Paula DeAnda, Theodore Thomas, Richard Frierson, Dwayne Carter
- Producer: Danja

Paula DeAnda singles chronology
"When It Was Me" (2007)	"Easy" (2007)	"Roll the Credits" (2009)

Bow Wow singles chronology
"Hydrolics" (2007)	"Easy" (2007)	"Girlfriend" (2007)

"Easy" is the fourth single from Paula DeAnda's self-titled album.

== Song information ==
The album version features rapper Lil Wayne, but many radio stations play the single version, which replaces Wayne with Bow Wow. A Spanish version of the song, "Fácil", exists; it only has her vocals without Bow Wow or Lil Wayne. (Fácil means easy in Spanish.) It is included in the bonus edition of her album Paula DeAnda.

== Chart information ==
"Easy" peaked at #64 on the U.S. Billboard Hot 100 and it spent a total number of 11 weeks on the Hot 100. Its final position was #90 during the charting week of September 22, 2007.

== Music video ==
The video was shot by Billie Woodruff. It was shown for the first time on television on TRL on July 18. The video features appearances by Baby Bash, Wilmer Valderrama, Bow Wow's artist Khleo Thomas, and Bow Wow himself. In the video, DeAnda can be seen applying make up and driving around in an Aston Martin, being chased continually by men. She shows off her more glamorous side for the first time in this video.

TRL muted the word "gun" out of the video which interrupts the correct instrumental.

== Track listing ==
=== Promo single ===
1. "Easy" (feat. Lil Wayne) (album version)
2. "Easy" (Instrumental)

=== U.S. single ===
1. "Easy" (feat. Lil Wayne) (album version)
2. "Easy" (feat. Bow Wow) (single version)

=== Digital single ===
1. "Easy" (feat. Bow Wow) (single version)

=== Remixes ===
1. "Fácil (Easy)"(Spanish version)
2. "Easy" (Aspuration Remix Edit)
3. "Easy" (Nu Shooz Mix) (Remixed by The Flyntstones)

== Personnel ==
- Danja – producer
- Timbaland – additional production
- Mad Scientist – vocal production
- Marcella "Ms. Lago" Araica – engineering, mixing

== Chart performance ==
Chart (2007)	Peak position
Canada CHR/Top 40 (Billboard)	33
US Billboard Hot 100	64
US Pop Airplay (Billboard)	18
US Rhythmic Airplay (Billboard)	29
