= One Question =

- Digital cover

EP by Ampers&One
- Released: October 22, 2024
- Genre: K-pop
- Length: 17:20
- Languages: Korean; English
- Label: FNC Entertainment

Ampers&One chronology
| One Hearted (2024) | One Question (2024) | Wild & Free (2025) |

Singles from One Question
- 1. "He + She = We" Released: October 22, 2024

One Question is the first extended play (EP) by South Korean boy band Ampers&One. It was released on October 22, 2024, by FNC Entertainment. The EP consists of six tracks, including the title track, "He + She = We".

== Themes and lyrics ==
The album's lead single, "He + She = We," perfectly embodies this concept. With its funky house beat, catchy rhythm and energetic melody, the song goes beyond the typical love formula, highlighting the idea that people can come together to truly complete each other.

The message of this album is 'becoming one. The title track is about how fans and we members complete each other ... The song has such a catchy melody that it's easy for anyone to enjoy. We hope people listen to it and see what kind of group we are, leaving a lasting impression on many.

— Kamden talks about the album.

== Commercial performance ==
The EP peaked at number 7 on the Korean Gaon Chart and has since sold more than 71,442 copies.

== Track listing ==
Credits adapted from FNC Entertainment website.

| No. | Title | Lyrics | Music | Arrangement | Length |
|---|---|---|---|---|---|
| 1. | "He + She = We" | Han Seong-ho; Jung Yong-hwa; Sooyoon | Han Seong-ho; Jung Yong-hwa; Park Soo-seok; Jung Jin-wook; Lee Tae-hyun; Jacob Aaron; Patrick “J. Que” Smith | Park Soo-seok; Jung Jin-wook; Lee Tae-hyun | 2:42 |
| 2. | "Calling You Back" | Han Seong-ho; Sooyoon; Lee Seung-hyub | Han Seong-ho; Park Soo-seok; Seo Ji-eun; Moon Kim; PIT300 | Park Soo-seok; Seo Ji-eun | 2:36 |
| 3. | "Slide" | Han Seong-ho; Sooyoon; Lee Seung-hyub | Be'O; J.Door; Eric Bellinger; Benjmn | J.Door | 2:54 |
| 4. | "Whip It" | Han Seong-ho; Sooyoon; Lee Seung-hyub; Kamden; Mackiah | Han Seong-ho; Lee Hyeon-seung; TM; Benjmn | Lee Hyeon-seung; TM | 2:28 |
| 5. | "Over the Moon" | Han Seong-ho; Sooyoon | Han Seong-ho; Park Soo-seok; Bong Won-seok; Benjmn; Tony Ferrari | Park Soo-seok; Bong Won-seok | 3:18 |
| 6. | "Fly" | Han Seong-ho; Lee Seung-hyub | Han Seong-ho; Park Soo-seok; Jung Jin-wook; Moon Kim; Lee Tae-hyun; Lee Seung-hyub | Park Soo-seok; Jung Jin-wook; Lee Tae-hyun | 3:20 |
| Total length: | | | | | 17:20 |

== Charts ==
Chart performance for One Question
| Chart (2024) | Peak position |
|---|---|
| South Korean Albums (Circle) | 7 |
