= Friday to Sunday =

Single by Justice Crew
- Released: 17 December 2010
- Recorded: 2010
- Genre: Electropop
- Length: 3:12
- Label: Sony Music
- Songwriter(s): Erika Nuri, Greg Ogan, Shridhar Solanki

Justice Crew singles chronology
"And Then We Dance" (2010)	"Friday to Sunday" (2010)	"Dance With Me" (2011)

"Friday to Sunday" is a song by Australian group Justice Crew. It was released digitally on 17 December 2010, as the follow-up to their debut single, "And Then We Dance". The song was written by Erika Nuri, Greg Ogan and Shridhar Solanki. It peaked at number 18 on the ARIA Singles Chart and was certified double platinum by the Australian Recording Industry Association (ARIA). An accompanying music video for the song was directed by Alex Goddard and features Justice Crew at a party.

== Background and release ==
"Friday to Sunday" was written by Erika Nuri, Greg Ogan and Shridhar Solanki. Nuri and Ogan are mostly known for their work with the songwriting team, The Writing Camp, who have previously written, arranged and produced tracks for Jason Derülo, Kelly Clarkson, Rihanna, Flo Rida, Britney Spears, Leona Lewis and Sean Kingston. Emmanuel Rodriguez of Justice Crew said: "The first time we heard the track, it instantly connected with the crew. The song is all about spending time with your friends, going out and enjoying the weekend – and that's exactly what we like to do when we're not working." "Friday to Sunday" was sent to Australian contemporary hit radio on 6 December 2010, and became the fifth most added song to Australian radio a week later. The song was released digitally on 17 December 2010.

== Chart performance ==
On 26 December 2010, "Friday to Sunday" debuted at number 31 on the ARIA Singles Chart, where it remained for two consecutive weeks. It peaked at number 18 on 16 January 2011. "Friday to Sunday" was certified double platinum by the Australian Recording Industry Association (ARIA), for selling 140,000 digital copies.

== Music video ==
The music video for the song was directed by Alex Goddard and premiered online on 22 December 2010. The video begins where "And Then We Dance" left off, showing Justice Crew leaving the underground parking lot. As the other six members leave, Samson, Lukas and Omar stop to discuss plans about a party for the night. After they decided that it would start at ten o'clock, Justice Crew spread the news about the party, by calling and texting everyone they know. As John and Lenny sing the first verse, Justice Crew appear in a three-by-three grid, similar to the opening title sequence in The Brady Bunch, with each member except Emmanuel who is asleep, looking at themselves in the mirror. They later arrive at the party except for Emmanuel, and begin their first dance sequence on a black and white floor tile. Emmanuel wakes up and realises he's late for the party and tries to arrive there as fast as he can. While Solo sings the chorus, Justice Crew each appear to be doing different types of break dancing techniques in the centre of a circle full of people. Emmanuel then arrives to the party and the group do their final dance sequence together.

== Track listing ==
- Digital download
1. "Friday to Sunday" - 3:12

== Charts and certification ==
=== Weekly chart ===
Chart (2011)	Peak position
Australian Singles Chart	18

=== Year-end charts ===
Chart (2011)	Rank
Australian Singles Chart	85
Australian Artists Singles Chart	8

=== Certification ===
Country	Certification
Australia	2× Platinum
