= Loud & Proud (EP) =

- Digital cover

EP by Ampers&One
- Released: August 12, 2025
- Genres: Hip hop; Pop; Dance-pop; House
- Length: 17:39
- Languages: Korean; English
- Label: FNC Entertainment

Ampers&One chronology
Wild & Free (2025)	Loud & Proud (2025)

Singles from Loud & Proud
- 1. "그게 그거지 (That’s That)" Released: August 12, 2025

Loud & Proud is the third extended play (EP) by South Korean boy band Ampers&One. It was released on August 12, 2025, by FNC Entertainment. The EP consists of six tracks, including the title track, "그게 그거지 (That’s That)".

== Themes and lyrics ==
The album comes four months after the band’s last EP Wild & Free, released in April. The new album follows a "rebellious angel" concept and features six tracks: the lead track "That’s That," and the B-sides "Seesaw," "Get Famous," "Move Out," "Did it," and "I’m Down." The members actively participated in the album’s productions, with Kamden and Mackiah being credited for the lyrics of all the tracks.

Their third EP, Loud & Proud, captures the confident Ampers&One, even in the face of the world's prejudices and standards. No matter what anyone says, they confidently declare, "Speak up!" and remain confident and bold in any situation. They particularly highlight the "bad angel" concept, subverting the conventional image of angels as benevolent and delivering a unique message.

When you think of an angel, you imagine a very kind and pure image. But we wanted to break that stereotype, even if we’re not perfect, we can still be cool and confident.

— Kyrell talks about the album.

== Music video ==
The music video conveys the message that true freedom can be found by remaining true to yourself and enjoying life in your own way, even in a chaotic world. The world suddenly experiences a glitch, buildings fall from the sky, and the members are trapped inside air conditioners, creating a chaotic situation. Yet, the Ampers&One members' playfully portray themselves enjoying the experience.

== Commercial performance ==
The EP peaked at number 2 on the Korean Gaon Chart and has since sold more than 108,215 copies. In just one week, the EP became AMPERS&ONE's most commercially successful release to date, surpassing their previous peak with April 2025's Wild & Free, and also marked the first time the group surpassed 100,000 units.

== Track listing ==
Credits adapted from FNC Entertainment website.

No.	Title	Lyrics	Music	Length
1.	"그게 그거지" (That’s That)	Han Seong-ho; Na Kamden; Mackiah	Han Seong-ho; Park Jung-jun; Calle Lehmann; Jacob Aaron (THE HUB)	3:15
2.	"삐걱삐걱" (Seesaw)	Han Seong-ho; Na Kamden; Mackiah	Han Sung-ho; Chae Yi-jun; Jinho Song; Benjmn; Jon Hall	3:25
3.	"Get Famous"	Han Seong-ho; Na Kamden; Mackiah	Han Seong-ho; Park Soo-seok; TAEY (LOGOS); Benjmn; Anthony Watts	2:32
4.	"길을 비켜" (Move Out)	Han Seong-ho; Na Kamden; Mackiah	Han Seong-ho; ByHVN (153/Joombas); Benjmn; Anthony Watts	2:51
5.	"일냈어" (Did It)	Han Seong-ho; Na Kamden; Mackiah	Han Seong-ho; Park Soo-seok; Seo Ji-eun; Patrick ‘J.Que’ Smith; Benjmn	2:42
6.	"I’m Down"	Han Seong-ho; Na Kamden; Mackiah; Jacob Aaron (THE HUB)	Han Seong-ho; Park Soo-seok; TAEY (LOGOS); Jacob Aaron (THE HUB); Calle Lehmann	2:54
Total length:				17:39

== Charts ==
Chart performance for Loud & Proud
Chart (2025)	Peak position
South Korean Albums (Circle)	3
