= Cry (LL Cool J song) =

Single by LL Cool J featuring Lil' Mo

from the album Exit 13
- Released: June 17, 2008
- Recorded: 2008
- Genre: Hip hop soul; R&B; hip hop
- Label: Def Jam
- Songwriters: J. Atkins; S. Blackshere; A. Dombrowski; K. Gamble; L. Huff; I. Lorenzo; C. Loving; R. Mays; B. Sigler; T. Smith
- Producer: Raw Uncut

LL Cool J singles chronology
"Freeze" (2006)	"Cry" (2008)	"Baby" (2008)

Lil' Mo singles chronology
"Sumtimes I" (2007)	"Cry" (2008)	"I Love Me" (2011)

"Cry" is a single by LL Cool J from his twelfth studio album, Exit 13 (2008). The song features guest vocals by R&B singer Lil' Mo and production by Andreas "Raw Uncut" Dombrowski. The song is noted for its sampling of Bunny Sigler's "Half a Man," and Ja Rule's "I Cry," which also happens to feature Lil' Mo. It was digitally released as an individual buzz single on June 17, 2008, and saw a limited international release as a B-side to the accompanying 12" single, "5 Boroughs," on June 24, 2008; alongside a US release on July 8, 2008.

== Chart performance ==
Chart (2008)	Peak position
US Billboard Bubbling Under Hot R&B/Hip-Hop Songs	19
