= Walk Away (Remember Me) =

2006 single by Paula DeAnda

Single by Paula DeAnda featuring The D.E.Y.

from the album Paula DeAnda
- Released: November 14, 2006
- Length: 4:21
- Label: Arista
- Songwriters: Christina Milian; Shaffer Smith; Mikkel S. Eriksen; Tor Erik Hermansen; Emilio Cancio-Bello; Dan Hill; Elan Luz Riviera; Rafael Torres; Steve Kipner
- Producer: Stargate

Paula DeAnda singles chronology
"Doing Too Much" (2006)	"Walk Away (Remember Me)" (2006)	"When It Was Me" (2007)

The D.E.Y. singles chronology
"Walk Away (Remember Me)" (2006)	"Give You the World" (2008)

"Walk Away (Remember Me)" is a song by American singer-songwriter Paula DeAnda. Written by Ne-Yo and Christina Milian together with producers Stargate, it was released in the United States in November 2006 as DeAnda's second single and features The D.E.Y.. The song is about feelings from an old relationship that have resurfaced once the protagonist has seen her ex's new girlfriend.

"Walk Away" reached number 18 on the US Billboard Hot 100 chart and number four on the Billboard Mainstream Top 40 chart, becoming DeAnda's first top-20 single on the Hot 100 as well as her biggest hit. The song also charted in Australia, peaking at number 60 on the ARIA Singles Chart in March 2007. A solo version with without the rap was also edited for radio. Both the solo version and collaboration with The D.E.Y. were eventually certified gold in the United States.

== Music video ==
In the music video, DeAnda is with her friends when she sees her old boyfriend with his new girlfriend. Then DeAnda and her old boyfriend make eye contact, and start to walk towards each other. As they are slowly walking, there are flashbacks to various moments in the past of DeAnda and her old boyfriend relating to the lyrics of the song. Once they finally reach each other, he touches her waist, DeAnda has a flashback of him flirting with another girl, implying to the viewers that they broke up because he cheated on her. Then DeAnda kisses him on the cheek and walks away with her friends.

== Chart ==
=== Weekly charts ===
Weekly chart performance for "Walk Away (Remember Me)"
Chart (2006–2007)	Peak position
Australia (ARIA)	60
Canada CHR/Top 40 (Billboard)	24
UK Singles Downloads (Official Charts)	97
US Billboard Hot 100	18
US Pop Airplay (Billboard)	4
US Rhythmic Airplay (Billboard)	8

=== Year-end charts ===
Year-end chart performance for "Walk Away (Remember Me)"
Chart (2007)	Position
US Billboard Hot 100	79

== Certifications and sales ==
Certifications for "Walk Away (Remember Me)"
Region	Certification	Certified units/sales
United States (RIAA) Digital; solo version	Gold	500,000^{*}
United States (RIAA) Mastertone; featuring The D.E.Y.	Gold	500,000^{*}
^{*} Sales figures based on certification alone.

== Release history ==
Release history and formats for "Walk Away (Remember Me)"
Region	Date	Format(s)	Label(s)	Ref.
United States	November 14, 2006	Digital download	Arista	
Australia	March 5, 2007	CD	Arista	
United Kingdom	January 21, 2008	CD	RCA	
