= Exit 13 =

Studio album by LL Cool J
- Released: September 9, 2008
- Length: 72:43
- Label: Def Jam
- Producer: SRay Burghardt; Cue Beats; DJ Scratch; the Dream-Team; Frado & Absolut; Dame Grease; Illfonics; Ryan Leslie; Marley Marl; Music Mystro; Raw Uncut; Tricky Stewart; Streetrunner; Suits

LL Cool J chronology
Todd Smith (2006)	Exit 13 (2008)	All World 2 (2009)

Singles from Exit 13
- 1. "Cry" Released: June 17, 2008; 2. "Rocking with the G.O.A.T." Released: June 20, 2008; 3. "Baby" Released: July 22, 2008; 4. "Feel My Heart Beat" Released: August 26, 2008

Exit 13 is the twelfth studio album by American rapper LL Cool J. It was released on September 9, 2008, on the record label Def Jam Recordings. It was his last album release with the label before his return 16 years later with The FORCE.

== Production ==
This album is the first LL Cool J album since G.O.A.T. to have the parental advisory label for explicit lyrics. LL said in an interview with Chicago radio personality DJ Z that the vulgarities are not heavy and the edited version has alternate lyrics rather than simply omitting the vulgarities. LL and DJ Kayslay teamed up to release his first mixtape as a prelude to Exit 13 titled The Return of the G.O.A.T..

Other contributors for this album include 50 Cent, Sheek Louch, Fat Joe, Ryan Leslie, Wyclef Jean, The-Dream, Lil' Mo, KRS-One, Funkmaster Flex, Richie Sambora and Darlisa Blackshere.

== Singles ==
A buzz single titled, "Cry," featuring Lil' Mo, was released as a digital download and international 12" single on June 17, 2008. The unofficial street single, "Rockin' with the G.O.A.T.," premiered on June 20, 2008.

The first official single, "Baby" featuring The-Dream was released on July 1, 2008, to the iTunes Music Store. On August 19, 2008, iTunes released the rock remix featuring Richie Sambora, lead guitarist of rock band Bon Jovi, with a rock rhythm and a sped-up tempo.

The second official single, "Feel My Heart Beat" featuring 50 Cent was released on August 26, 2008. The song did not enter the Billboard Hot 100. The official single version of the song was leaked to the Internet on November 27, 2008.

== Critical reception ==
Professional ratings
Aggregate scores
Source	Rating
Metacritic	57/100
Review scores
Source	Rating
AllMusic	2/5 stars
Okayplayer	3.5/5 stars
DJBooth	3.5/5 stars
Metromix	4/5 stars
NOW	3/5 Ns
RapReviews	8.0/10
The Times	3/5 stars
USA Today	3/4 stars

Exit 13 garnered mixed reviews from music critics. At Metacritic, which assigns a normalized rating out of 100 to reviews from mainstream critics, the album received an average score of 57, based on 5 reviews.

Despite being too lengthy and containing lesser tracks like "American Girl", Jesal Padania of RapReviews praised the album for having a consistent sound of instruments and synths in the tracks and LL's strong lyricism, saying that "In other words, all that effort that LL finally put into Exit 13 has really paid off - and he is getting the best revenge of all... Showing Def Jam what they will be missing." Steve Jones of USA Today called it LL's "most aggressive album in years," praising his standard braggadocio and lady-swooning content for being consistently energetic because of an amalgam of young up-and-coming producers, concluding that "After 10 straight platinum albums, his last two have only gone gold. But he seems to have gotten his swagger back. He may be hitting the Exit, but he is not easing up on the gas."

In The New York Times, Jon Pareles felt that LL more than holds his own with the sounds delivered by newer producers that lift his old-school meets new-school lyricism, concluding with, "To his credit, LL Cool J is too romantic to treat women as crudely as younger rappers do. And while this 76-minute album flags near the end, there's still more than enough smooth-tongued, quick-witted rhyming to justify his boasts." AllMusic's Andy Kellman said that despite tracks like "You Better Watch Me" and "This Is Ring Tone M..." that show LL at his best, he criticized the record for being too try-hard in sounding like the mainstream rap albums released that year, concluding that "Out with a whimper, not a bang, Exit 13 is an off-ramp leading to a boulevard of several mismanaged White Castle knock-offs."

== Chart performance ==
Exit 13 debuted and peaked at number nine on the US Billboard 200 in the week of September 27, 2008, selling 44,000 copies in its first week of release. By October 2008, it had sold 80,000 copies in the United States, according to Nielsen SoundScan. Exit 13 would become LL Cool J's final album with Def Jam. In regards to the album's reception and lack of proper marketing, he stated in 2009: "The record just really honestly, you know, didn't have that support that I wish it would have had. [I] can't blame anyone. It was my last record, and I guess for whatever reason, whether it was quality or business, you know, the company just decided that they were going to write it off and not really give it that shot."

== Track listing ==
Exit 13 track listing
No.	Title	Writer(s)	Producer(s)	Length
1.	"It's Time for War"	Ray Burhardt; Justin Cartisano; J. Mendelson; James Todd Smith	Suits; Burghardt	5:06
2.	"Old School New School"	Ryan Leslie; Smith	Leslie	3:41
3.	"Feel My Heart Beat" (featuring 50 Cent & Precious Paris)	Mark Cury; Curtis Jackson; Kaplan Kaye; Kenton Nix; Smith; Donald Woolfolk	The Dream Team	3:21
4.	"Get Over Here" (featuring Nicolette, Jiz, Lyrikal & Ticky Diamondz)	Shaune Muir; Alfredo Rivera; Smith	Frado & Absolut	5:49
5.	"Baby" (featuring The-Dream)	Terius Nash; Smith; Christopher Stewart	Tricky Stewart	4:01
6.	"You Better Watch Me"	Vincent Davis; Joel Roper; Chuck Rio; Smith; Marlon Williams	Marley Marl	4:20
7.	"Cry" (featuring Lil' Mo)	Jeffrey Atkins; Blackshere; Andreas Dombrowski; Kenneth Gamble; Leon Huff; Irving Lorenzo, Jr.; Cynthia Loving; Robert Mays; Bunny Sigler; Smith	Raw Uncut	4:15
8.	"Baby (Rock Remix)" (featuring Richie Sambora)	Burghardt; Cartisano; Richie Sambora; Smith	Suits; Burghardt	3:08
9.	"Rocking with the G.O.A.T."	Smith; George Spivey	DJ Scratch	3:43
10.	"This Is Ring Tone Murder" (featuring Grandmaster Caz)	Curtis Brown; Smith; Spivey	DJ Scratch	2:52
11.	"Like a Radio" (featuring Ryan Leslie)	Leslie; Smith	Leslie	3:34
12.	"I Fall in Love" (featuring Élan)	Blackshere; Burghardt; Cartisano; Élan Luz Rivera; Smith	Suits; Burghardt	3:57
13.	"Ur Only a Customer"	Damon J. Blackmon; Jerry Cohen; Eric Johnson; Gene McFadden; Smith; John Whitehead	Dame Grease; Music Mystro	2:18
14.	"Mr. President" (featuring Wyclef Jean)	Blackshere; Burghardt; Cartisano; Smith	Suits; Burghardt	4:35
15.	"American Girl" (featuring Mark Figueroa)	Jed Cappelli; Matthew Friedman; Smith	Illfonics	4:26
16.	"Speedin' on da Highway / Exit 13" (featuring Funkmaster Flex)	Burghardt; Cartisano; Smith	Suits; Burghardt	4:49
17.	"Come and Party with Me" (featuring Fat Joe & Sheek Louch)	Cappelli; Joseph Cartagena; Friedman; Sean Jacobs; Smith	Illfonics	4:37
18.	"We Rollin'"	Willie Clarke; Clarence Reid; Smith; Quentin Staples	Cue Beats	3:03
19.	"Dear Hip Hop" (featuring DJ Scratch)	Johnny Bristol; Doris McNeil; Shawn Moltke; Smith; Nicholas Warwar; Williams	Streetrunner	4:28

Australian version – bonus tracks
No.	Title	Writer(s)	Producer(s)	Length
20.	"5 Boroughs" (featuring KRS-One, Method Man, Jim Jones & Lil' Kim)	Clifford Smith, Jr.; J. Smith; Joseph Jones; Cartisano; Lawrence Parker; Leonard Grant; Burghardt	Suits & Ray Burghardt	4:28

Japanese version – bonus tracks
No.	Title	Writer(s)	Producer(s)	Length
20.	"New York, New York" (Interlude)		Kander and Ebb	0:18
21.	"New York"	Burghardt; Cartisano; Larry Gold; Smith	Suits; Burghardt	3:58

iTunes bonus tracks
No.	Title	Writer(s)	Producer(s)	Length
22.	"5 Boroughs" (featuring KRS-One, Method Man, Jim Jones & Lil' Kim)	Clifford Smith, Jr.; J. Smith; Joseph Jones; Cartisano; Lawrence Parker; Leonard Grant; Burghardt	Suits & Ray Burghardt	4:28

Sample credits

- "Dear Hip Hop"
  - "I'm Still a Struggling Man" by Edwin Starr
- "Cry"
  - "Half a Man" by Bunny Sigler
  - "I Cry" by Ja Rule feat. Lil' Mo
- "It's Time for War"
  - "The Ultimate" by Jarrid Mendelson
- "Listen to My Heart Beat"
  - "Take Me with You" by Lyn Christopher
  - "Heartbeat" by Taana Gardner
- "Old School New School"
  - "Who Shot Ya?" by the Notorious B.I.G.
- "Ur Only a Customer"
  - "I've Been Pushed Aside" by McFadden & Whitehead
  - "Mary Jane (All Night Long) (Remix)" by Mary J. Blige feat. LL Cool J
- "We Rollin'"
  - "90% of Me Is You" by Gwen McCrae
- "You Better Watch Me"
  - "Pee-Wee's Dance" by Joeski Love
  - "I'm a Hustla" by Cassidy

== Charts ==
=== Weekly charts ===
Weekly chart performance for Exit 13
Chart (2008)	Peak position
Canadian Albums (Nielsen SoundScan)	61
Swiss Albums (Schweizer Hitparade)	75
UK Albums (OCC)	164
UK R&B Albums (OCC)	26
US Billboard 200	9
US Top R&B/Hip-Hop Albums (Billboard)	3
US Top Rap Albums (Billboard)	2

=== Year-end charts ===
Year-end chart performance for Exit 13
Chart (2008)	Position
US Top R&B/Hip-Hop Albums (Billboard)	100
