= I'll Be There (Tiffany Evans song) =

Single by Tiffany Evans
- Released: September 29, 2010
- Genre: R&B
- Length: 4:40
- Label: Columbia
- Songwriters: L. Carr, A. Granderson

Tiffany Evans singles chronology
"I'm Grown" (2008)	"I'll Be There" (2010)	"Won't Find Me" (2011)

"I'll Be There" is a song recorded by American singer Tiffany Evans. It was released on September 29, 2010 as the lead single from her second album, Perfect Imperfection.

== Music video ==
The music video for "I'll Be There" debuted on December 6, 2010 on Tiffany's official Myspace page, and was available for download on iTunes the following day. The video begins with Tiffany on a rooftop overlooking the city, singing and in tears. She then writes an unknown word on her hand. While singing, images of a domestically abused woman, a child crying, another woman, and a man in handcuffs are shown. The woman has the word "despised" written on her hand, the boy has "helpless", the other woman has "betrayed", and the man has "flawed". The majority of the video is in black and white, until the song reaches its peak and the color appears. Tiffany is seen in a room with pictures hanging from the ceiling. Then all of the words are changed with "positive" ones, such as "protected", and lovely. Ultimately, Tiffany shows her hand with the words "Faith", "Hope", and "Trust".

== Track listing ==
- Digital download
1. "I'll Be There" - 4:40

== Chart positions ==
Chart (2010–2011)	Peak position
U.S. Hot Dance Club Play	15
U.S. Hot R&B/Hip-Hop Songs	61
