= Baby (LL Cool J song) =

Single by LL Cool J featuring The-Dream

from the album Exit 13
- Released: July 22, 2008
- Recorded: 2008
- Genre: Hip hop; R&B
- Length: 4:07
- Label: Def Jam
- Songwriters: James Smith; Terius Nash; Christopher Stewart
- Producer: Tricky Stewart

LL Cool J singles chronology
"Cry" (2008)	"Baby" (2008)	"Feel My Heart Beat" (2008)

The-Dream singles chronology
"Please Excuse My Hands" (2008)	"Baby" (2008)	"Cookie Jar" (2008)

"Baby" is the third single from American rapper LL Cool J's twelfth album, Exit 13. It features R&B singer The-Dream, who co-wrote and produced the song alongside record producer Tricky Stewart.

== Music video ==
The music video, directed by Benny Boom, premiered on FNMTV on July 11, 2008. In the video, they are at a party. LL spots a girl, played by Nicole Fiscella, and throughout the video, it shows him and the girl in a car and a store. The-Dream and LL Cool J stand back to back during The-Dream's verse.

== Responses and samples ==
Rapper Chamillionaire released a skit entitled "Not Your Baby". His song "Answer Machine 3", on his Mixtape Messiah 4 album, sampled "Baby"'s instrumental.

== Charts ==
=== Weekly charts ===
Chart (2008)	Peak position
UK Singles (Official Charts)	56
US Billboard Hot 100	52
US Pop 100 (Billboard)	75
US Hot R&B/Hip-Hop Songs (Billboard)	22
US Hot Rap Songs (Billboard)	10
US Rhythmic Airplay (Billboard)	18

=== Year-end charts ===
Chart (2008)	Position
US Hot R&B/Hip-Hop Songs (Billboard)	92

== Release ==
iTunes started a type of Countdown to Exit 13. The first release was Baby featuring The-Dream and the second release was the rock remix of "Baby" featuring Richie Sambora.

== Rock Remix ==
The rock remix of "Baby" featuring Richie Sambora is the official remix of the song, and the remix is in the album as the 8th track.

The song was released on August 19, 2008, as an 'exclusive single' on iTunes. The cover is slightly different from the Baby single, because it was a darker look.
