= 143 (EP) =

Mixtape by Tiffany Evans
- Released: February 12, 2013
- Recorded: 2012
- Genres: R&B; hip hop; pop
- Length: 38:37
- Label: Little Lady Entertainment
- Producers: Tiffany Evans; TopSecret; Chris N Teeb; B.Fre$h; MaddScientist; Watch The Duck; Trak Girl; Sak Pose; Dexter James

Tiffany Evans chronology
Tiffany Evans (2008)	143 (2013)	All Me (2015)

Singles from 143
- 1. "U Got a Woman" Released: January 10, 2012; 2. "If You Love Me" Released: June 8, 2012

143 is an extended play/mixtape by American singer Tiffany Evans. The EP was released on February 12, 2013, under Tiffany's recording label Little Lady Entertainment. It produced two singles: "U Got a Woman" and "If You Love Me", both released in 2012.

== Singles ==
- EP's lead single was "U Got a Woman". First released as a buzz single on 10 January 2012 via Lucky Lady Entertainment, it appeared as a bonus track on EP.
- On June 8, 2012, Evans announced in an interview with Essence.com, that she had been married for one year and nine months and was expecting a child with her husband, Lorenzo Henderson. Evans and her husband welcomed their baby girl, Adalia Henderson, on September 25, 2012. Along with the news of her marriage and pregnancy, Evans also released her second single off the EP titled "If You Love Me", a powerful R&B ballad.

== Track listing ==
No.	Title	Writer(s)	Producer(s)	Length
1.	"143 (I Love You)"	Tiffany Evans; Ryan Jones	Chris N Teeb	5:19
2.	"Do Better"	Evans	B.Fre$h; TopSecret for Top-Brand LLC	3:54
3.	"I Can't Fight"	Evans; Jones	Woelf	4:10
4.	"I Ride 4 U"	Evans; Elijah Blake	MaddScientist	2:40
5.	"Tell a Chic"	Evans; Eddie Waltrez; Jonathan Wells; Jessie Smith	Watch The Duck	3:33
6.	"Lois Lane"	Evans; Blake	Sak Pase	3:37
7.	"Note to Self (Looking for Love)"	Evans	Sweetz	3:29
8.	"I Found You"	Evans	Trak Girl; Dexter Jakes	5:02
9.	"If You Love Me"	Evans	Chris N Teeb	4:07
10.	"U Got a Woman" (bonus track)	Evans	Watch The Duck; Bao	4:06
Total length:				38:37
