= One Hearted =

- Digital cover

Single album by Ampers&One
- Released: March 26, 2024
- Genre: K-pop
- Length: 9:24
- Languages: Korean; English
- Label: FNC Entertainment

Ampers&One chronology
Ampersand One (2023)	One Hearted (2024)	One Question (2024)

Singles from One Hearted
- 1. "Broken Heart" Released: March 26, 2024

One Hearted is the second single album by South Korean boy band Ampers&One. It was released on March 26, 2024, by FNC Entertainment. The album consists of three tracks, including the title track, "Broken Heart".

== Themes and lyrics ==
One Hearted contains a total of three songs. The main one, Broken Heart, is a hip-hop dance with a heavy bass line that talks about that feeling of the heart beating like crazy after falling in love at first sight.

Member Choi Jiho commented that when he heard the title song, he had a feeling of fast movements around him while he was in slow motion.

‘Unlike our debut song ‘On and On,’ our comeback has a more powerful performance, so it was important to work on our timing.

— Kamden talks about the album.

== Commercial performance ==
The single album sold 66,243+ copies in South Korea. It peaked at number 10 on the Circle Album Chart.

== Track listing ==
One Hearted track listing
No.	Title	Lyrics	Length
1.	"Broken Heart"	Han Seong-Ho; Sooyoon; Sebastian Thott; Patrick “J. Que” Smith; Jacob Aaron (The Hub)	2:54
2.	"Crazy Stupid Fun"	Han Seong-Ho; Sooyoon; Lee Seung-Hyub (J.Don); Park Soo-Suk; Seo Ji-Eun; Benjmn	3:27
3.	"Someday"	Han Seong-Ho; Sooyoon; Lee Seung Hyub (J.Don); Park Soo Suk; Jeong Jin Wook; Lee Tae-Hyun (producer); Patrick “J. Que” Smith; Jacob Aaron (The Hub)	3:03
Total length:			9:24

== Charts ==
Weekly chart performance for One Hearted
Chart (2024)	Peak position
South Korean Albums (Circle)	10
