= Ampersand One =

- Digital cover

Single album by Ampers&One
- Released: November 15, 2023
- Genre: K-pop
- Length: 9:39
- Languages: English; Korean
- Label: FNC Entertainment

Ampers&One chronology
Ampersand One (2023)	One Hearted (2024)

Singles from Ampersand One
- 1. "On and On" Released: November 15, 2023

Ampersand One is the debut single album by South Korean boy band Ampers&One. It was released on November 15, 2023, by FNC Entertainment. The album consists of three tracks, including the title track, "On and On".

== Background ==
The energetic and youthful album, "Ampersand One," carries three tracks -- "On and On," "Sweet & Sour" and "Sheesh." The songs tell the story of young adults who are determined to keep pursuing their dreams even when things get tough and who confess their feelings of first love.

== Commercial performance ==
On the Circle Album Chart for the month of December 2023, Ampersand One peaked at number 28 in December 2023. In 2024, it peaked at number 26 in week 2, and 61 in week 5.

== Track listing ==
Credits adapted from FNC Entertainment website.

No.	Title	Lyrics	Music	Arrangement	Length
1.	"On and On"	Han Seong-ho; Sooyoon; Lee Seung-hyub; Kamden	Han Seong-ho; Park Su-seok, Lee Tae-hyun, Benjmn, Jacob Aaron	Park Su-seok, Lee Tae-hyun	3:11
2.	"Sweet & Sour"	Han Seong-ho; Sooyoon	Han Seong-ho; Moon Kim; Maxx Song; PIT300; Mattt	Mattt	3:16
3.	"Sheesh"	Han Seong-ho; Sooyoon	Han Seong-ho; Park Su-seok; Seo Ji-eun; Eric Bellinger	Park Su-seok, Seo Ji-eun	3:12
Total length:					9:39

== Charts ==
=== Weekly charts ===
Weekly chart performance for Ampersand One
Chart (2023)	Peak position
South Korean Albums (Circle)	11

=== Monthly charts ===
Monthly chart performance for Ampersand One
Chart (2023)	Peak position
South Korean Albums (Circle)	28
