= Hefa Leone Tuita =

American dancer (born 1991)

Hefa Tuita
- Born: June 18, 1991 (age 34); Spanish Fork, Utah, USA
- Other names: "Rickroddles, Jumpsplash, Dragon, Nighthawk"
- Years active: 2005 - present

Hefa Tuita (born June 18, 1991) is an American dancer. He danced on the Nickelodeon T.V. show Dance on Sunset and appeared in the film Unaccompanied Minors. He also danced in the movie High School Musical 2 and in Alexis Jordan's "Good Girl" video. In 2011 he appeared in an Old Navy commercial (Super C-U-T-E) with Melissa Molinaro.

== Early life ==
Hefa was born in Spanish Fork, Utah, to a Euro-American mother, Karley Tuita, and Tongan father, Hefa Tuita. He has two younger brothers, Soane and Tu'iniua. Tu'iniua made a cameo appearance in High School Musical 3: Senior Year. He also has an older brother, Taylor, from a different mother. Hefa began playing sports and dancing when he was eight years old. Hefa also sings (with his younger brothers). He has danced for acts like Jennifer Lopez, Janet Jackson, Rihanna, Neyo and Usher. He was one of Chris Brown's back up dancers on the F.A.M.E. Tour and appeared in Brown's "Look At Me Now", "I Can Transform Ya", and "She Ain't You" videos.

== Personal life ==
Hefa and his brothers Soane and Tu'nuia also sing and dance together. They are all in a group called the Tuita Brothers and have a music video called "Love Me Always and More" on YouTube. The Tuita brothers were featured on Dancing With the Stars as a part of the "Spotlight Series". They performed to the song "Party Rock Anthem".
