= Wild & Free (EP) =

- Digital cover

EP by Ampers&One
- Released: April 8, 2025
- Genre: K-pop; Pop; Hip hop; R&B; Dance pop
- Length: 17:35
- Language: Korean; English
- Label: FNC Entertainment

Ampers&One chronology
One Question (2024)	Wild & Free (2025)	Loud & Proud (2025)

Singles from Wild & Free
- 1. "Kick Start" Released: April 8, 2025

Wild & Free is the second extended play (EP) by South Korean boy band Ampers&One. It was released on April 8, 2025, by FNC Entertainment. The EP consists of six tracks, including the title track, "Kick Start".

== Themes and lyrics ==
The second EP, ‘Wild & Free’, is an album that contains the message of navigating the world in one’s own way. It may be awkward and quirky at times, but it hides endless passion and confident confidence. Ampersand One decided that the theme of this album is about communicating with each other and somehow forging one’s own path, even when it’s cold and dark. The title song ‘Kick Start’ is a hip-hop dance song with a heavy bass line and synth sound, along with various FX sounds. It contains the message that no matter what difficulty, you can overcome it if you put your mind to it, so don’t be afraid and try anything first. The seven members’ colorful vocals and trendy, energetic performances combine to create an immersive stage.

Members Na Kamden and Mackiah participated in the writing of the songs for the second mini album Wild and Free, signaling a more solid musical color. They were credited with writing lyrics for three songs, including the title song "Kick Start", "My Mistake", and "I Know You". Na Kamden also participated in writing the lyrics for "WYD", showcasing his unique sensibility, and Mackiah broadened his musical spectrum by taking on the challenge of writing lyrics for the title song for the first time. Expectations are high for this new album, which contains their musical growth.

I focused a lot on the song's emotions. I wanted to convey the message of keeping trying easily. It was an honor to participate in writing the lyrics for three songs. I tried to give each one meaning so you can picture the scenes as you listen.

— Kamden & Mackiah talks about the album.

== Music video ==
The music video for "Kick Start" delivers a more specific message about boldly overcoming fear. The music video, which captures charming and bizarre situations that take place in a bungeoppang factory, delivers the message that "imaginary fears are huge but insubstantial, and in reality, they're nothing special." The scene is witty as it depicts a cat's den as a bread factory, and the members add to the fun by implementing the unique movements and expressions of cats.

== Track listing ==
Credits adapted from FNC Entertainment website.

No.	Title	Lyrics	Music	Length
1.	"Kick Start"	Han Seong-ho; Na Kamden; Mackiah	Han Seong-ho; Lee Hyun-seung; TM; Patrick ‘J.Que’ Smith; Jacob Aaron (THE HUB)	3:01
2.	"My Mistake"	Han Seong-ho; Na Kamden; Mackiah	Han Sung-ho; Lee Hyun-seung; Hwang Tae-young; Night View; Patrick ‘J.Que’ Smith; Noerio (THE HUB); Johny Kwony; Rhody	2:49
3.	"Who Are You"	Han Seong-ho	Han Seong-ho; SlyBerry; Rapid; Patrick ‘J.Que’ Smith; Jacob Aaron (THE HUB)	2:49
4.	"I Know You"	Han Seong-ho; Na Kamden; Mackiah	Han Seong-ho; Nathan Cunningham; Marc Sibley; Anthony Watts; Patrick ‘J.Que’ Smith	3:05
5.	"Knock Knock"	Han Seong-ho	Han Seong-ho; Sebastian Thott; Patrick ‘J.Que’ Smith; Eric Bellinger	2:56
6.	"WYD"	Han Seong-ho; Na Kamden	Han Seong-ho; Park Soo-seok; Jeong Jin-wook; Benjmn	2:56
Total length:				17:35

== Charts ==
Chart performance for Wild & Free
Chart (2025)	Peak position
South Korean Albums (Circle)	3
