= Paula DeAnda (album) =

Studio album by Paula DeAnda
- Released: August 29, 2006
- Genres: Dance-pop; R&B
- Length: 48:23
- Label: Arista
- Producers: Danja; Dusty & Mike; Stephen Ferrera; Russell Lee; Happy Perez; Andy Quinn; Sixx John & Sauce; Stargate; Shea Taylor; Nick "P.B." Washington

Singles from Paula DeAnda
- 1. "Doing Too Much" Released: June 3, 2006; 2. "Walk Away (Remember Me)" Released: November 14, 2006; 3. "When It Was Me" Released: January 6, 2007; 4. "Easy" Released: May 15, 2007

Paula DeAnda is the only studio album by American singer Paula DeAnda. It includes six singles: "Doing Too Much" featuring Baby Bash, "Walk Away (Remember Me)" featuring The DEY, "When It Was Me", and "Easy" featuring Bow Wow. As well as two promotional singles "Clap ta This" and "Back Up Off Me". The song "Overloved", written by Diane Warren, was originally recorded by Raven-Symoné for her third album, This is My Time (2004). The album peaked at number 54 on the Billboard 200. By June 2007, the album had sold over 214,000 copies.

== Critical reception ==
Professional ratings
Review scores
Source	Rating
USA Today	2/4 stars

AllMusic editor found that "with an equal emphasis on sultry R&B ballads and uptempo dance-pop, Paula DeAnda's 2006 self-titled debut can easily be filed next to contemporary R&B divas like Beyoncé and Mariah Carey [...] Yet DeAnda's voice and lyrics add a bit of bite to the glossy R&B, and that distinctive twist, along with major-label support, make the singer a talent to watch." Elysa Gardner of USA Today gave Paula DeAnda a two-star rating, describing it as a modest introduction that relied on predictable production and guest appearances. She praised DeAnda's youthful charm and highlighted "When It Was Me" and "Good Girl" as tracks where her personality came through most effectively.

== Track listing ==
Paula DeAnda track listing
No.	Title	Writer(s)	Producer(s)	Length
1.	"Doing Too Much" (featuring Baby Bash)	Paula DeAnda; Ronald Bryant; Nathan Perez; Angel Noa	Happy Perez	4:06
2.	"Walk Away (Remember Me)" (featuring The D.E.Y.)	Shaffer Smith; Christina Milian; Erik Tor Hermansen; Mikkel Eriksen; Rafael Torres; Emilio Cancio-BelloElan Rivera	StarGate	4:20
3.	"Easy" (featuring Lil Wayne)	Nate Hills; Dwayne Carter, Jr.; Richard Frierson; Londell ‘Nikko’ Smith	Danja	3:56
4.	"When It Was Me"	Smith; Shea Taylor	Taylor	4:01
5.	"Overloved"	Diane Warren	Andy Zulla; Stephen Ferrera	3:59
6.	"So Cold"	Makeba Riddick; Hermansen; Eriksen	StarGate	3:39
7.	"Good Girl"	DeAnda; Michael Aguirre; Natalie Alvarado; Horacio Olivera; Eddie Watkins	Dusty & Mike; Ferrera	2:40
8.	"Wanna Be with You" (featuring V Nice)	Francisco Bautista; Vince Milson; Andy Quinn	Quinn	3:28
9.	"Clap ta This" (featuring Ak'Sent)	Smith; Sixx Johnson; Krystle Johnson; Curtis Wilson; Eric Barrier; William Griffin	Sixx John; Sauce	3:48
10.	"Breathe"	DeAnda; Aguiree; Olivera; Angelo Pintello; Christopher Fonseca; Gil Askey; Linda Clifford	Dusty & Mike; Ferrera	3:26
11.	"Let's Go Out Tonight"	DeAnda; Alvarado; Olivera; Aguirre; Nicolas Washington; Reginald Andrews; Leon Chancler; Donald Sterling	Dusty & Mike; Ferrera	2:58
12.	"I'll Be Down for You"	DeAnda; Olivera; Russell Atkins; Steve-O Valdez	Russell Lee	4:12
13.	"Footprints on My Heart"	DeAnda; Perez; Valdez; Atkins; Chad Roussel	Happy Perez	3:50

International edition bonus track
No.	Title	Writer(s)	Producer(s)	Length
14.	"Alegría"	DeAnda; Mickaël Zibi	Zibi	2:53

Japanese edition bonus track
No.	Title	Writer(s)	Producer(s)	Length
15.	"Back Up Off Me"	Smith; Marcus Allen; Melvan Sparkman	The Heavyweights	3:29

2007 digital re-issue
No.	Title	Writer(s)	Producer(s)	Length
3.	"Easy" (featuring Bow Wow)	Hills; Carter, Jr.; Frierson; Ruffin	Danja	3:28
14.	"Back Up Off Me"	Smith; Marcus Allen; Melvan Sparkman	The Heavyweights	3:29
15.	"Lo Que Hago por Tu Amor (Doing Too Much)" (featuring Baby Bash)	DeAnda; Bryant; Perez; Noa	Happy Perez	4:06
16.	"Irresistible" (featuring Max Minelli)	DeAnda; Perez; Lee; Chad Roussel	Happy Perez	4:10
17.	"Facil (Easy)"	Hills; Frierson; Ruffin	Danja	3:12

Notes

- "Overloved" is a cover of the track of the same name, originally sung by Raven-Symoné.
- "Clap ta This" is labeled as "Make 'em Clap ta This" on physical pressings in North America.

Sample credits

- "Good Girl" contains a portion of the composition "That's How It Is" written by Eddie Watkins, Jr.
- "Clap ta This" contains a sample from "Eric B. Is President" written by Eric Barrier & William Griffin as performed by Eric B. & Rakim.
- "Breathe" contains a sample from "Please Darling, Don't Say Goodbye" written by Gil Askey & Linda Clifford as performed by Linda Clifford
- "Let's Go Out Tonight" contains a portion of the composition "Thinking About Your Charm" written by Reginald Andrews, Leon "Ndugu" Chancler and Donnie Sterling.

== Charts ==
Chart performance for Paula DeAnda
Chart (2006)	Peak position
US Billboard 200	54
