= Ampers&One =

South Korean boy band

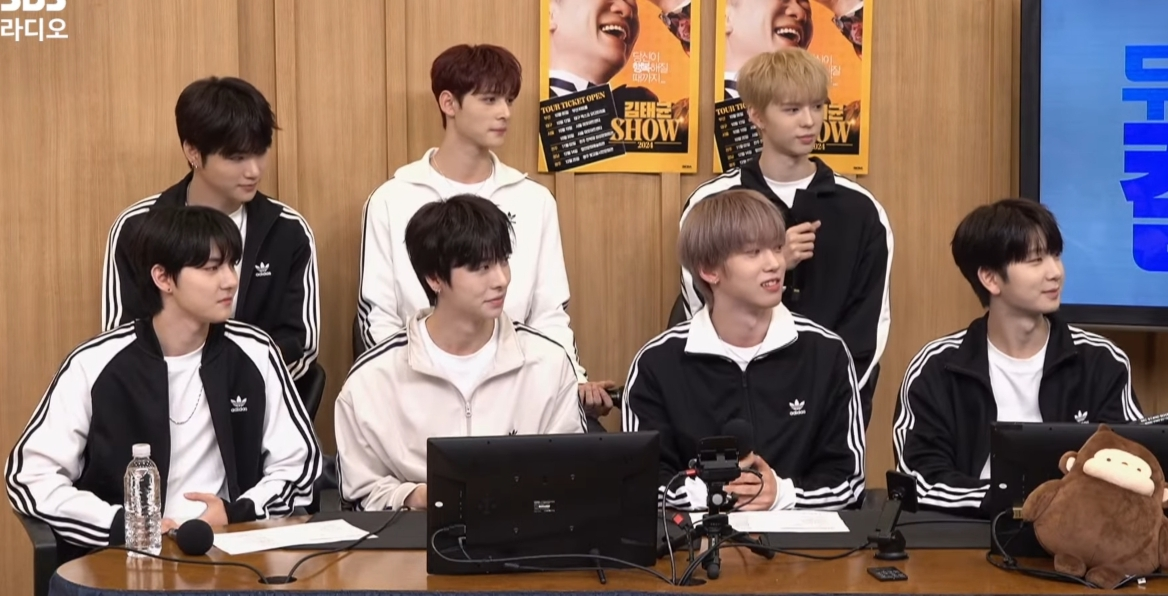
- Ampers&One in November 2024; Top Row: Siyun, Mackiah, Brian; Bottom Row: Seungmo, Jiho, Kamden, Kyrell

Background information
- Origin: Seoul, South Korea
- Genres: K-pop; Hip hop; R&B
- Years active: 2023–present
- Label: FNC
- Members: Kamden; Brian; Jiho; Siyun; Kyrell; Mackiah; Seungmo
- Website: fncent.com/AMPERSANDONE

Ampers&One (Korean: 앰퍼샌드원; RR: Aempeosaendeuwon; stylized in all caps) is a South Korean boy band formed and managed by FNC Entertainment. The group consists of seven members: Kamden, Brian, Jiho, Siyun, Kyrell, Mackiah, and Seungmo. They debuted on November 15, 2023, with the single album Ampersand One.

== Name ==
Ampers&One is a fusion of the symbol "& (ampersand)" and the word "one". The name reflects the group's wish "to achieve its dreams by coming together as a group".

== History ==
=== Pre-debut ===
Prior to the group's debut, Siyun was a trainee under YG Entertainment. He participated in YG's survival show YG Treasure Box in 2018 but was eliminated in the eighth episode.

In 2021, Kamden and Jiho participated in the MBC survival show Extreme Debut: Wild Idol but both were eliminated in the third episode.

In 2023, Kamden, Brian, and Jiho took part in the Mnet reality competition show Boys Planet, with Kamden and Jiho representing FNC Entertainment and Brian being a Yuehua Entertainment trainee. Jiho was eliminated in the fifth episode after ranking 55th. Subsequently, Brian ranked at 37th place and was eliminated in the eighth episode. Kamden participated in the finale, ranking 17th.

=== 2023–2024: Debut with Ampersand One, One Hearted, and One Question ===
On September 5, 2023, FNC Entertainment announced that they would be debuting a seven-member boy group in early 2024. Later that month, on September 26, the agency announced a change of plans, with the group's debut brought earlier to November 2023. In the same press release, they confirmed Kamden and Jiho as the first two members of the lineup.

On October 18, FNC Entertainment announced that the group would be debuting under the name "Ampers&One". On the same day, Brian was revealed as the third member of the confirmed lineup.

On November 15, the group debuted with the single album Ampersand One and its lead single "On and On", with lyrics co-written by Kamden.

On March 26, 2024, the group released their second single album One Hearted and its lead single "Broken Heart".

On October 22, 2024, the group released their first extended play One Question and its lead single "He + She = We".

=== 2025: First international tours and Wild & Free ===
On December 27, 2024, Leo Presents announced that they had signed a contract with the group to bring them on their first United States tour, titled My First. The tour began on February 17, 2025, and comprised a total of 19 stops across 18 different states. Following the last show of the tour on March 18, FNC Entertainment announced that the group would be releasing a new EP, Wild & Free, on April 8.

== Members ==
- Kamden (나캠든) – leader, rapper, dancer
- Brian (브라이언) – vocalist
- Jiho (최지호) – vocalist
- Siyun (윤시윤) – vocalist
- Kyrell (카이렐) – vocalist
- Mackiah (마카야) – rapper
- Seungmo (김승모) – vocalist

== Discography ==
=== Extended plays ===
List of extended plays, showing selected details, selected chart positions, and sales figures
Title	Details	Peak chart positions	Sales
Title	Details	KOR	Sales
One Question	Released: October 22, 2024; Label: FNC Entertainment; Formats: CD, digital download, streaming; Track listing: 1. "He + She = We"; 2. "Calling You Back"; 3. "Slide"; 4. "Whip It"; 5. "Over the Moon"; 6. "Fly"	7	KOR: 71,442
Wild & Free	Released: April 8, 2025; Label: FNC Entertainment; Formats: CD, digital download, streaming; Track listing: 1. "Kick Start"; 2. "My Mistake"; 3. "Who Are You"; 4. "I Know You"; 5. "Knock Knock"; 6. "WYD"	3	KOR: 80,307
Loud & Proud	Released: August 12, 2025; Label: FNC Entertainment; Formats: CD, digital download, streaming; Track listing: 1. "That's That"; 2. "Seesaw"; 3. "Get Famous"; 4. "Move Out"; 5. "Did It"; 6. "I'm Down"	2	KOR: 111,616
Definition	Released: April 8, 2026; Label: FNC Entertainment; Formats: CD, digital download, streaming; Track listing: 1. "Hit Me Up"; 2. "God"; 3. "What You Talking About" (뭐라는 거야); 4. "My Way" (나는 나대로); 5. "All Eyes On You"; 6. "Tears in Your Smile" (너의 웃음 속에 눈물이 보여)	3	KOR: 147,213

=== Single albums ===
List of single albums, showing selected details, selected chart positions, and sales figures
Title	Details	Peak chart positions	Sales
Title	Details	KOR	Sales
Ampersand One	Released: November 15, 2023; Label: FNC Entertainment; Formats: CD, digital download, streaming; Track listing: 1. "On And On"; 2. "Sweet & Sour"; 3. "Sheesh"	11	KOR: 58,470
One Hearted	Released: March 26, 2024; Label: FNC Entertainment; Formats: CD, digital download, streaming; Track listing: 1. "Broken Heart"; 2. "Crazy Stupid Fun"; 3. "Someday"	10	KOR: 66,243

=== Singles ===
List of singles, showing year released, selected chart positions, and name of the album
Title	Year	Peak chart positions	Album
Title	Year	KOR Down.	Album
"On and On"	2023	98	Ampersand One
"Broken Heart"	2024	76	One Hearted
"He + She = We"	2024	135	One Question
"Kick Start"	2025	88	Wild & Free
"That's That"	2025	74	Loud & Proud
"God"	2026	112	Definition

=== Other charted songs ===
Title	Year	Peak chart positions	Album
Title	Year	KOR Down.	Album
"Get Famous"	2025	119	Loud & Proud
"삐걱삐걱" (Seesaw)	2025	120	Loud & Proud
"I'm Down"	2025	121	Loud & Proud
"일냈어" (Did It)	2025	122	Loud & Proud
"길을 비켜" (Move Out)	2025	124	Loud & Proud
"Tears in Your Smile" (너의 웃음 속에 눈물이 보여)	2026	130	Definition
"All Eyes On You"	2026	131	Definition
"What You Talking About" (뭐라는 거야)	2026	132	Definition
"My Way" (나는 나대로)	2026	133	Definition
"Hit Me Up"	2026	134	Definition

== Awards and nominations ==
Name of the award ceremony, year presented, award category, nominee(s) of the award, and the result of the nomination
Award ceremony	Year	Category	Nominee / work	Result	Ref.
Hanteo Music Awards	2023	Rookie of the Year – Male	Ampers&One	Nominated	
Hanteo Music Awards	2025	Emerging Artist	Ampers&One	Nominated	
MAMA Awards	2024	Artist of the Year	Ampers&One	Nominated	
MAMA Awards	2024	Best New Male Artist	Ampers&One	Nominated	
MAMA Awards	2025	Fans' Choice Top 10 – Male	Ampers&One	Nominated	
