= When It Was Me =

Single by Paula DeAnda

from the album Paula DeAnda
- Released: January 6, 2007
- Length: 4:01
- Songwriter(s): Shaffer "Ne-Yo" Smith, Robert Shea Taylor
- Producer(s): Robert Shea

Paula DeAnda singles chronology
"Walk Away (Remember Me)" (2006)	"When It Was Me" (2007)	"Easy" (2007)

"When It Was Me" is Paula DeAnda's third single on her debut album Paula DeAnda. Paula's pensive thoughts are expressed, nonetheless sung, about how her ex-boyfriend shows much affection to his new love, when that person used to be her. According to Paula, the way he treats his girlfriend is better than the way he treated her. Paula says throughout the first and second verses that she's not jealous, but overall she really is aware of the changes, and really wants what her ex-boyfriend is giving to the other girl.

This song was co-written by Ne-Yo. The song received some very minor airplay on a few Top 40/pop stations in Texas, but it didn't make the Mainstream Top 40 or Pop 100 Airplay charts. The song received moderate airplay on some rhythmic radio stations causing it to chart on the Rhythmic Top 40; it peaked at number 25 on the chart.

== Chart performance ==
Chart	Peak position
US Bubbling Under Hot 100 Singles (Billboard)	13
US Rhythmic (Billboard)	25
