= Tiffany Evans (album) =

Studio album by Tiffany Evans
- Released: April 22, 2008
- Length: 43:46
- Label: Columbia
- Producers: Julian Bunetta; B. Carr; Chase N. Cashe; The Clutch; Mr. Collipark; D'Mile; Beau Dozier; Hit-Boy; Eric Hudson; Rodney "Darkchild" Jerkins; Brian Kidd; Billy Mann; RedOne; Brian "B-Nasty" Reid; Soulshock & Karlin; Shea Taylor

Tiffany Evans chronology
Tiffany Evans (EP) (2004)	Tiffany Evans (2008)	143 (2013)

Singles from Tiffany Evans
- 1. "Promise Ring" Released: May 15, 2007; 2. "I'm Grown" Released: January 12, 2008

Tiffany Evans is the self-titled debut album by R&B singer Tiffany Evans. It was released by Columbia Records on April 22, 2008, in the United States and on August 27, 2008, in Japan with two bonus tracks. Executive produced by Ciara and The Clutch, the album peaked at number 134 on US Billboard 200. The album's first single was "Promise Ring", which features Ciara and is Evans' most successful single to date. The second single was "I'm Grown", which features Bow Wow.

== Background ==
Evans spent much of her childhood in New York City before her family relocated to Atlantic City, New Jersey, during a period of homelessness. While in Atlantic City, Evans gained early public attention after singing at the Tropicana casino, an experience that motivated her to pursue a music career. Her family subsequently sought recording opportunities and performance gigs, including an early meeting with Columbia Records when Evans was 10 years old, though no agreement was reached at the time.

Evans later rose to prominence after appearing on the television talent competition Star Search, where she won five consecutive times. Following her success on the show, she signed a recording deal with Columbia. Her growing profile led to multiple appearances on The Oprah Winfrey Show. In addition to music, Evans pursued acting, appearing in the television series The District and the film Diary of a Mad Black Woman. She also collaborated with the Limited Too clothing line, releasing an exclusive EP through the retailer.

== Promotion ==
"Promise Ring" featuring singer Ciara was released as the main single from Evans' self-titled debut album on 29 May 2007. Produced by Mr. Collipark, Brian "B-Nasty" Reid, and The Clutch, it peaked at number one on Billboard's US Bubbling Under Hot 100. "I'm Grown" was released as the album's second and final single on 12 January 2008. Featuring a guest appearance by rapper Bow Wow, it peaked at number 99 on the US Hot R&B/Hip-Hop Songs chart.

== Critical reception ==
Professional ratings
Review scores
Source	Rating
AllMusic	4/5 stars
DJBooth	4/5 stars
USA Today	2.5/4 stars

Both DJBooth and AllMusic gave Tiffany Evans four out of five stars. AllMusic editor Matthew Chisling described the album as "a sampling of the years that could come" for Evans, praising her musical maturity and saying it "sets a new standard for teen pop." He also commended her vibrant performances, noting that her vocals "never get lost in the music" and effectively balanced youthful appeal with contemporary R&B production. Steve Jones of USA Today also praised Evans' debut, highlighting her "voice that seems a little farther along in years than its owner" and its catchy material. While noting that the songs mostly remained in a "girl-thinking-about-boys mode," he felt that several "edgier songs hint that there is more beneath the thematic surface."

== Commercial performance ==
Tiffany Evans debuted and peaked at number 134 on the US Billboard 200 and reached number 20 on the Top R&B/Hip-Hop Albums chart.

== Track listing ==
Tiffany Evans — Standard edition
No.	Title	Writer(s)	Producer(s)	Length
1.	"Promise Ring" (featuring Ciara)	Ezekiel Lewis; J. Que; Balewa Muhhammad; Candice Nelson; Brian "B-Nasty" Reid; Michael Crooms	Mr. Collipark; The Clutch; Reid	4:27
2.	"I'm Grown" (featuring Bow Wow)	Crystal Johnson; Rodney "Darkchild" Jerkins; Dernst Mile II; LaShawn Daniels; Richard Butler; Shad Moss; Rahman Lang	Jerkins; D'Mile; Daniels^{[a]}	3:35
3.	"Impossible"	Shaffer Smith; Shea Taylor	Taylor; Ne-Yo^{[b]}	3:46
4.	"Thinkin' About"	Carsten Schack; Kenneth Karlin; Alex Cantrall; Que; Jimi James	Soulshock & Karlin	4:08
5.	"Can't Walk Away"	Beau Dozier; Samantha Jade	Dozier	3:51
6.	"Lay Back & Chill"	Chauncey Hollis; Jesse Woodard; Brandon Carrier; Jasper Cameron; Corey Williams; Lamar Edwards; Deniece Williams; Thom Bell	Hit-Boy; B. Carr; Chase N. Cashe	3:31
7.	"Girl Gone Wild"	Brian Kidd; Lewis; Nelson; Keri Hilson; Muhammad; Que	Kidd; The Clutch	4:15
8.	"About a Boy"	Eric Hudson; Lewis; Nelson; Muhammad; Que	Hudson	3:11
9.	"Favorite Broken Heart"	Dozier; Julian Bunetta; Chris Kelly	Dozier; Bunetta; Kelly	4:51
10.	"Again"	Nadir Al-Khayat; Omerit Hield; Tori London; Marvin Prosper	RedOne	4:38
11.	"Angels on Earth"	Billy Mann; Christopher Rojas	Mann	4:08

Tiffany Evans — Japanese edition (bonus tracks)
No.	Title	Writer(s)	Producer(s)	Length
12.	"Let Me Be Your Angel"	Narada Michael Walden; Bunny Hull; Frank Martin	Walden	3:39
13.	"Flying Without Wings"	Steve Mac; Wayne Hector		3:53

Notes

- ^{^a} denotes vocal producer
- ^{^b} denotes co-producer

== Charts ==
Weekly chart performance for Tiffany Evans
Chart (2008)	Peak position
US Billboard 200	134
US Top R&B/Hip-Hop Albums (Billboard)	20

== Release history ==
Tiffany Evans release history
Region	Date	Format	Label	Ref(s)
United States	April 22, 2008	CD, digital download	Columbia	
Japan	August 27, 2008	CD	Sony	
