= Paula DeAnda =

American singer (born 1989)

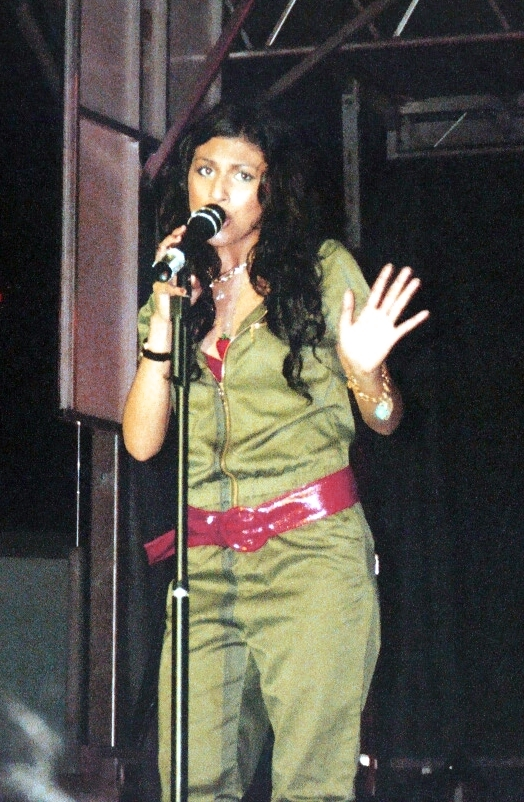
- DeAnda in March 2007

Background information
- Born: Paula Dacia DeAnda; November 3, 1989 (age 36); San Angelo, Texas, U.S.
- Genres: Pop; soul; R&B; hip hop; dance
- Occupations: Singer; songwriter; actress
- Instrument: Vocals
- Years active: 2006–present
- Labels: Arista Records; Audium

Paula Dacia DeAnda (born November 3, 1989) is an American singer and songwriter. She is best known for the 2006 US Billboard Hot 100 top twenty single "Walk Away (Remember Me)". Her debut album, Paula DeAnda, was released in 2006.

== Early life ==
DeAnda was born in San Angelo, Texas, to Mexican-American parents Steven and Barbara Dienda, a restaurant general manager and a registered nurse, respectively. At age six she began taking piano lessons and was soon singing at functions around town at the recommendation of her piano teacher. She also sang the national anthem at local football games. In 2002, DeAnda's family decided to move to Corpus Christi in order to help advance her career in music since Corpus Christi had a reputation as a music hub. She attended Mary Carroll High School.

== Career ==
=== 2006–2009: Debut album Paula DeAnda ===
DeAnda was the opening act for a concert which featured hip-hop artists, Nelly, Baby Bash and Frankie J. performing in front of twenty thousand people. Her first single, "What Would It Take" was serviced to local radio stations in July, received airplay from ten radio stations across the country. Her next single "Doing Too Much" was released in December. It was then that she got the opportunity to audition for Clive Davis who signed her with Arista Records on the spot.

"Doing Too Much" served as the lead single to her self-titled debut album which was released in the summer of 2006, and charted in the Top50 of the Billboard Hot 100. It was later certified gold in the US in 2007. Paula DeAnda charted at No. 54 on the Billboard 200 chart. The album mainly consists of songs about love and relationships and is of the pop-R&B genre. DeAnda co-wrote four songs on the album, which features production from Happy Perez among others. She was only 16 years old at the time of the album's release. Her second single "Walk Away (Remember Me)" (written by Christina Milian and Ne-Yo) was her biggest hit, reaching the top twenty on the Hot 100. The single was certified gold by the RIAA, becoming her second single to do so. Follow-up singles from her debut included "When It Was Me" and "Easy", the latter featuring rapper Bow Wow. She later appeared in the MTV television film Super Sweet 16: The Movie.

In 2008, DeAnda began production on next effort, initially due in 2009. A buzz single "Stunned Out" was released and garnered some airplay, but the set's lead single ended up being the ballad "Roll the Credits", which was released with a music video was planned. Clive Davis left Arista's parent company at the time, RCA Label Group in 2008 to become the chief creative officer for Sony BMG. DeAnda also parted ways with Arista to become an independent artist following his departure.

=== 2010–2014: Scrapped second album, The Voice and The Voice & the Beats EP ===
After leaving Arista Records, DeAnda's sophomore album was shelved, in addition to a tentative Spanish album. However her Spanish album was leaked to Yahoo Musica, a Latin Music venue that featured her leaked singles from the sophomore album. Following this period, DeAnda began posting a series of covers on YouTube in the summer of 2010. DeAnda released a series of digital singles: "Besos" in 2011 which would later be covered by Jojo, "Your Place" in 2012 and "Shut Up and Love Me" in 2013.

Following her digital releases in 2013, DeAnda was selected to perform the National Anthem live on television at the Canelo vs Trout fight.

In 2014, DeAnda auditioned for Season 6 of NBC's singing competition, The Voice. Both Shakira and Blake Shelton turned their chairs but she opted for Blake Shelton. During the Battles, Round 1, she was defeated by fellow Team Blake teammate Sisaundra Lewis after their duet of Lady Gaga's "Do What U Want".

Stage	Song	Original artist	Date	Order	Result
Blind Audition	The Way	Ariana Grande	March 10, 2014	5.3	Shakira and Blake Shelton turned Joined Team Blake
Battles, Round 1	"Do What U Want" (vs. Sisaundra Lewis)	Lady Gaga	March 17, 2014	8.5	Eliminated

After The Voice, DeAnda collaborated with the Jump Smokers on her first EP The Voice & The Beats, which was released on June 25, 2014, and featured the first single "Horns Blow (Shimmy Shimmy)".

=== 2015–2019: Second EP PDA, Collaborations, etc. ===
In February 2015, DeAnda launched a Kickstarter campaign to help fund a new album, which was achieved in a couple of weeks. In May, she announced an EP titled PDA. The project was to be preceded by the song, "Brand New", released on March 23, 2015.

In early 2018 DeAnda was asked to sing the Star Spangled Banner once more for the televised rematch fight Canelo Álvarez vs. Gennady Golovkin II. In April 2019, DeAnda featured on a single titled "Killin' My Vibe" by Waseem Shark and Dub Shakes, which featured her vocals in Hindi and garnered airplay success in Southeast Asia.

By October 3, 2019, DeAnda released Iddi Biddi, which paid homage to Selena and Aaliyah. The song was later followed by lyric visuals and is set to promote the revival of her PDA project. Since December 2019, Paula has been hinting for a possible musical collaboration between her and Nivea. Both singers have shown interest in working together.

== Influences ==
DeAnda has cited Christina Aguilera, Jo Dee Messina, Shania Twain, Aaliyah, Brandy, LeAnn Rimes, Mariah Carey, Whitney Houston and Selena as major musical influences.

== Discography ==
=== Studio albums ===
Title	Album details	Peak chart positions	Sales
Title	Album details	US	Sales
Paula DeAnda	Released: August 29, 2006; Label: Arista; Format: CD, digital download	54	US: 214,000+

=== Extended plays ===
List of extended plays, with selected details
Title	EP details
The Voice & the Beats (with Jump Smokers)	Released: June 24, 2014; Label: JS Sound; Formats: Digital download
4th of July with Hi Jackson & the Country Club	Released: July 4, 2019; Label: Audiam; Formats: Digital download

=== Singles ===
Year	Title	Peak chart positions				Certifications (sales thresholds)	Album
Year	Title	US	US Pop	AUS	UK Down.	Certifications (sales thresholds)	Album
2006	"Doing Too Much"	41	20	—	—	RIAA: Gold	Paula DeAnda
2006	"Walk Away (Remember Me)" (both solo and featuring The D.E.Y.)	18	4	60	97	RIAA: Gold	Paula DeAnda
2007	"When It Was Me"	—^{[A]}	—	—	—		Paula DeAnda
2007	"Easy"	64	18	—	—		Paula DeAnda
2009	"Roll the Credits"	—	—	—	—		Non-album singles
2011	"Besos"	—	—	—	—		Non-album singles
2012	"Your Place"	—	—	—	—		Non-album singles
2013	"Shut Up and Love Me"	—	—	—	—		Non-album singles
2014	"The Way" (The Voice performance single)	—	—	—	—		Non-album singles
2014	"Horns Blow (Shimmy Shimmy)"	—	—	—	—		The Voice & the Beats
2015	"Marching"	—	—	—	—		Non-album singles
2015	"Don't Stop"	—	—	—	—		Non-album singles
2019	"Roll It"	—	—	—	—		Non-album singles
2019	"Iddi Biddi"	—	—	—	—		Non-album singles
2020	"Call It Quits"	—	—	—	—		Non-album singles
2020	"Freaky"	—	—	—	—		Non-album singles
2023	"IIWY"	—	—	—	—		Non-album singles
2024	"For the Night"	—	—	—	—		Non-album singles
2024	"No Puedo"	—	—	—	—		Non-album singles
2026	"BEE FAMOUS (featuring Bee Famous)"	—	—	—	—		Non-album singles
"—" denotes a recording that did not chart or was not released in that territory.

Promotional singles

- 2006 - "Clap ta This" from Paula DeAnda
- 2006 - "Back Up Off Me" from Paula DeAnda

Notes

- A "When It Was Me" did not enter the Billboard Hot 100, but peaked at number 13 on the Bubbling Under Hot 100 Singles chart.

=== Music videos ===
Year	Video	Director
2006	"Doing Too Much"	Diane Martel
2006	"Walk Away (Remember Me)"	Ray Kay
2007	"Easy"	Bille Woodruff
2007	"When It Was Me"	Ed Oacanas
2011	"Besos"	Happy Perez
2013	"Your Place"	Larry Servin
2015	"Brand New"	Freddy Dang
2019	"I Don't Wanna Wait"	Potent
2019	"Roll It"	Mark Amar
2020	"OG"	DX
2020	"Mí Droga"	H3ctor
2020	"Cowboy Boots"	Jeff Adair

=== Guest appearances ===
List of non-single guest appearances, with other performing artists, showing year released and album name
Title	Year	Other artist(s)	Album
"There's Nothin'"	2007	Sean Kingston	Sean Kingston
"Supa Chic"	2007	Baby Bash	Cyclone
"As Days Go By (The Love Letter)"	2007	Baby Bash	Cyclone
"Bubble On"	2007	Latino Velvet, Angel Dust	The Camp Is Back
"Best Friend"	2010	That Dirty Mexican Zoe	Mindin My Bizniz
"Dreamin'"	2011	MC Magic, Don Cisco	The Rewire
"Thanks For Looking Over Us"	2011	Jay Tee, Baby Bash, Mugzi	The Game Is Cold
"Get It In"	2011	Lucky Luciano	Money Bags
"Keep The Party Alive"	2012	Enoc	Non-album single
"Crazy"	2012	Baby Jay	Luv & Respect
"Sittin' In Somethin New"	2013	Jay Tee, Baby Bash, Big Gemini	Vallejo Mentality
"Butterfly Kisses"	2013	Baby Bash, Frankie J.	Unsung The Album
"Spoiled Lil Bitch"	2013	Baby Bash, Mickael, Lucky Luciano	Unsung The Album
"Space City"	2013	DJ Go Hi-C, Young Fresh, Slim Thug, Bun B, Killa Kyleon	Houston Is Certified
"Look Around"	2014	Big Gemini, Yung Blast	Deadly Melody
"Pray For Me"	2014	GT Garza	Young Mexico + Brown Funeral
"Run Thangs"	2015	Honey Cocaine	The Gift Rap EP
"Pobre Cancionero"	2016	Sebastien De La Cruz	Non-album single
"I Don't Know You"	2016	Josh-B	Non-album single
"On Tonight"	2016	Lil Rob	Da Beats Album Vol. 1 (Compilation)
"Body Yo Body"	2017	Baby Bash, Frankie J., Kap G	Sangria
"Ain't No Sunshine"	2018	Baeza, GT Garza	Non-album single
"America"	2019	Hi Jackson & The Country Club, Bizness Boi	4th Of July With Hi Jackson & The Country Club
"Killin' My Vibe"	2019	Waseem Stark, Dub Shakes	Non-album single
"I Don't Wanna Wait"	2019	Rico Rossi, M-Status	Non-album single
"OG"	2020	Drei, Oplus	Origin
"Mi Droga"	2020	YBE	Non-album single
"Hopeless"	2020	R!OT, Jake Barker	Hopeless EP
"Cowboy Boots"	2020	Hi Jackson & The Country Club	Non-album single
"Valentine's Kisses"	2021	Baby Bash, MC Magic	Non-album single
"One More Time"	2021	Krystall Poppin	Non-album single
"Somos Novios"	2024	Tortilla Factory, Gilbert DeAnda "El Coyote"	Non-album single
"Baddies"	2024	Sara Jeihooni	Pretty Girl Complex
Tus Ojos	2025	Tortilla Factory, The Game	Non-album single

== Filmography ==
=== Film ===
Year | Film | Role

2007 | Super Sweet 16: The Movie | Alicia

2008 | Paula DeAnda (Video-EPK) | Herself

2012 | Barbie in a Mermaid Tale 2 | Soundtrack only
