= There's Nothin =

Single by Sean Kingston featuring Élan and Juelz Santana

from the album Sean Kingston (The Deluxe Edition)
- Released: March 13, 2008
- Recorded: 2007
- Length: 3:45
- Label: Beluga Heights; Koch; Epic
- Songwriters: Kisean Anderson; Evan "Kidd" Bogart; J. R. Rotem; LaRon Louis James
- Producer: J.R. Rotem

Sean Kingston singles chronology
"That's Gangsta" (2008)	"There's Nothin" (2008)	"Fire Burning" (2009)

The D.E.Y. singles chronology
"Give You the World" (2007)	"There's Nothin" (2008)	"I Need You/She Said" (2008)

Juelz Santana singles chronology
"Curious" (2008)	"There's Nothin" (2008)	"Let Me Show You" (2008)

"There's Nothin" is the fourth single from Sean Kingston's self-titled debut album. The single features Élan of the D.E.Y. and Juelz Santana. The album version features Paula DeAnda. The song was produced by J. R. Rotem and co-written by Sean Kingston and Evan "Kidd" Bogart.

Radio Disney aired a version without Juelz Santana that features only Sean Kingston and Élan. In the chorus, they change it from "Satisfy my needs" to "Make me feel at peace".

== Music video ==
The video was released in February 2008.

== Charts ==
Chart performance for "There's Nothin"
Chart (2008)	Peak position
Australia (ARIA)	85
Romania (Romanian Top 100)	47
US Billboard Hot 100	60
US Hot R&B/Hip-Hop Songs (Billboard)	63
US Pop Airplay (Billboard)	24

== Certifications ==
Certifications for "There's Nothin"
Region	Certification	Certified units/sales
New Zealand (RMNZ)	Gold	15,000^{‡}
^{‡} Sales+streaming figures based on certification alone.

== Release history ==
Release dates and formats for "There's Nothin"
Region	Date	Format	Label(s)	Ref.
United States	April 1, 2008	Mainstream airplay	Beluga Heights; Epic; Koch	
