= Tiffany Evans (EP) =

EP by Tiffany Evans
- Released: October 12, 2004
- Recorded: 2003–2004
- Genre: R&B; soul
- Length: 28:33
- Label: Columbia

Tiffany Evans chronology
| Tiffany Evans (2004) | Tiffany Evans (2008) |

Singles from Tiffany Evans
- 1. "Let Me Be Your Angel" Released: September 7, 2004

Tiffany Evans is the self-titled debut extended play by American R&B singer-songwriter Tiffany Evans. It was released by Columbia Records with bonus DVD on October 12, 2004 (see 2004 in music. The EP contains covers of songs by many popular singers including Stacy Lattisaw, Cyndi Lauper and Shanice. The album's main and only single, a cover of Lattisaw's song "Let Me Be Your Angel" (along with its B-side "I Want You Back", originally by The Jackson 5) was released on September 7, 2004 with the music video. "Let Me Be Your Angel" was a minor hit in United States, peaking #95 on Billboard's Hot 100.

In 2008, when Evans' self-titled debut album was released, EP was re-released by Columbia Records, and with the same track listing and cover art.

== Background ==
In February 2003, in her Star Search appearance, Tiffany Evans won the Grand Champion title in the junior singer division, becoming the only performer in Star Search history to receive the perfect five scores in all of her appearances. In the competition, Evans competed against fellow singers Lisa Tucker and David Archuleta who both later appeared on American Idol. At the age of 10, she sang for executives at Columbia Records, and she was offered a recording contract deal.

After the EP was released, Tiffany released two new promotional songs: "The Christmas Song" and "Star Spangled Banner" in 2004 and later two digital singles: "Thinkin' About" in 2005 and "Who I Am" following year.

== Singles ==
"Let Me Be Your Angel" is the main single released from EP. It was released on 7 September 2004. Music video was also released in late 2004. Song is a cover of Stacy Lattisaw's song with the same name. "Let Me Be Your Angel" was a minor hit, peaking number 95 on Billboard Hot 100 chart in 2004. Music video was released in late 2004. It shows Tiffany leaving the house, walking in the street and singing. Later it shows her on concert singing the song, but that was Tiffany's imagination and then she saw her parents sitting in the audience.

"I Want You Back" is the second single. It's "Let Me Be Your Angel"'s B-side, also released on 7 September. It's a cover of The Jackson 5's 1969 hit-single. Unlike the first single, its A-side, "I Want You Back" didn't enter any chart and there is no music video for that song released.

There were no more singles from the album, but Tiffany sang Jennifer Holliday's Dreamgirls soundtrack song "And I'm Telling You I'm Not Going" (also known simply as "And I'm Telling You") in her Star Search appearance in February 2003.

== Track listing ==
Tiffany Evans (standard/re-release edition CD+DVD)
| No. | Title | Writer(s) | Length |
|---|---|---|---|
| 1. | "Let Me Be Your Angel" (Stacy Lattisaw cover) | Narada Michael Walden; Bunny Hull | 3:44 |
| 2. | "I Love Your Smile" (Shanice cover) | Walden; Shanice Wilson; Jarvis La Rue Baker; Sylvester Jackson | 4:18 |
| 3. | "And I'm Telling You I'm Not Going" (Jennifer Holliday cover) | Tom Eyen; Henry Krieger | 4:09 |
| 4. | "Sing" | | 3:56 |
| 5. | "Tomorrow" | | 4:06 |
| 6. | "I Want You Back" (The Jackson 5 cover) | The Corporation - (Berry Gordy, Freddie Perren, Alphonzo Mizell, Deke Richards) | 3:13 |
| 7. | "True Colors" (Cyndi Lauper cover) | Billy Steinberg; Tom Kelly | 3:46 |
| 8. | "The Christmas Song (bonus track)" | Robert Wells; Mel Tormé | 4:45 |
| Total length: | | | 33:18 |

== Charts ==
Let Me Be Your Angel

| Chart (2005) | Position |
|---|---|
| US Billboard Hot 100 | 95 |
