= Élan Luz Rivera =

American singer (born 1982)

- Also known as: Élan of The D.E.Y.
- Born: New York City, New York, U.S.
- Genres: Hip hop; Latin; pop; R&B
- Occupations: Singer; actress
- Instrument: Vocals
- Years active: 1993–present
- Label: Epic

Élan Luz Rivera is an American Latin hip hop singer and actress. She is one-third of Latin hip-hop trio The D.E.Y.

== Early life and education ==
Rivera was born and raised in New York City. As a child she worked as an actress, appearing in the movie, Life with Mikey, and also made a guest appearance on the television series, Ghostwriter. Elan attended LaGuardia High School for Music and Art and Performing Arts (The "Fame" School).

== Career ==
She made her first appearance on Broadway as Cookie in the musical play The Capeman from 29 January to 28 March 1998 at the Marquis Theatre in New York. From 26 April to 13 May 2001 she played Susie Rogers in musical comedy The Adventures of Tom Sawyer at the Minskoff Theatre in New York. In 2005, Divine introduced her to rapper Yeyo. During the making of their album, she worked with the American pop singer Ashley Tisdale in the background vocals for her 2007 hit song "He Said She Said" and wrote "Fuego" for The Cheetah Girls' with producer J.R. Rotem and songwriter Evan Bogart.

Rivera was featured and wrote on The 2008 LL Cool J album Exit 13 under the name Elan of The Dey.

== Voices ==
- Sunny Day - Rox
- Grand Theft Auto IV: The Ballad of Gay Tony - The People of Liberty City
- Grand Theft Auto IV - Carmen Ortiz
