= Give You the World =

Single by The D.E.Y.

from the album The D.E.Y. Has Come
- Released: November 6, 2007
- Studio: Chalice Studios, Los Angeles
- Genre: Latin, hip-hop, R&B
- Length: 3:53 (original version); 3:32 (new album version)
- Label: Sony BMG; Epic
- Songwriters: Evan Bogart, Emilio Cancio-Bello, Jasmin Lopez, Elan Luz Riviera, Rafael Torres, Maurice White, Verdine White, J.R. Rotem, Eduardo del Barrio
- Producer: J.R. Rotem

The D.E.Y. singles chronology
"Walk Away (Remember Me)" (2006)	"Give You the World" (2007)	"There's Nothin'" (2008)

"Give You the World" is a song by The D.E.Y. from their debut EP and debut album, both titled The D.E.Y. Has Come. It was released as a digital download on November 6, 2007 through Sony BMG, and re-released as a shorter version on April 22, 2008. It was serviced to contemporary hit radio in the United States by Epic Records on February 26, 2008. The song was produced by J.R. Rotem, and samples Earth, Wind & Fire's "Fantasy".

There are two versions of the song. In the video version, Divine, and Yeyo handle the verses while Elan does the bridge, while in the radio version all three share the second verse and the lyrics are different, and much shorter.

Before the song was released as a single, it was originally titled "On Top of the World".

== Chart positions ==
Chart (2007–2008)	Peak position
US Hot R&B/Hip-Hop Songs (Billboard)	59
US Hot Rap Songs (Billboard)	22
US Rhythmic (Billboard)	29
