= Rico Rossi (musician) =

American rapper

- Occupations: Rapper; singer; songwriter; entrepreneur
- Years active: 2011–present
- Musical career
- Genres: Hip hop; R&B
- Instrument: Vocals
- Website: ricorossi.com

Rico Rossi is a Bay Area hip hop recording artist and entrepreneur from Vallejo, California. In 2012, he released his debut single "Take Em Down" featuring Too Short and Baby Bash. He is best known for his single "Too Cold" featuring Idrise and Don Chino, which peaked at number 12 on the German Urban Charts.

== Career ==
In 2011, Rico Rossi was falsely accused and falsely arrested for a crime based on misleading information, which lead to the start of his musician career. He documented this incident through his debut single "Take Everything", which is based on his perspective as the victim.

Beginning of 2016, the Bay Area musician Rico Rossi started his own business venture, called Leangria. The product Leangria, is a cannabis infused fruit syrup concentrate, exclusively sold in the States that have legal recreational or medicinal marijuana. Using the "Leangria" moniker, Rico Rossi established his own clothing line combining his business venture with his music career.

In 2018 the comedy movie "Don't Get Caught" starring Snoop Dogg and E-40 was premiered, where Rico Rossi played the character "Lewis the Gangster". In August 2018, Rico Rossi's product Leangria won the first place at the High Times Cannabis Cup and was crowned as Alaska's best edible cannabis.

== Discography ==
=== Singles ===
==== As lead artist ====
List of singles as lead artist, with selected chart positions, showing year released and album name
| Title | Year | Peak chart positions | Album |
| Title | Year | GER | Album |
|---|---|---|---|
| "Take Em Down" (featuring Too $short, Baby Bash) | 2012 | – | Non-album single |
| "Double Time" (Rico Rossi & Beeda Weeda) | 2013 | – | Non-album single |
| "Twerk That Booty" (Rico Rossi featuring Chilee Powdah & Beeda Weeda) | 2013 | – | Non-album single |
| "Liquor In Me" (Rico Rossi featuring Chilee Powdah & Jay Musiq) | 2013 | – | Non-album single |
| "Look At Her Go" (Rico Rossi featuring Clyde Carson, Mike Marty & Brizzy Bee) | 2014 | 30 | Non-album single |
| "Party Hard" (Rico Rossi featuring Beeda Weeda, Chilee Powdah & 1-O.A.K.) | 2014 | – | Non-album single |
| "Party Hard" (Rico Rossi featuring Beeda Weeda, Chilee Powdah & 1-O.A.K.) | 2014 | – | Non-album single |
| "Take Everything" (Rico Rossi) | 2014 | – | Non-album single |
| "Selfish Love" (Rico Rossi featuring Baby Bash, Marty JayR & Tania Ponce) | 2014 | – | Non-album single |
| "On My Line" (Rico Rossi featuring Celly Cel, D-Shot & Chilee Powdah) | 2015 | – | Non-album single |
| "M.O.B." (Rico Rossi featuring The Jacka, Beeda Weeda & Chilee Powdah) | 2015 | – | Non-album single |
| "Take It All Off" (Rico Rossi featuring Marty JayR) | 2015 | – | Non-album single |
| "Like That" (Rico Rossi featuring Clyde Carson & Keak Da Sneak) | 2015 | – | Non-album single |
| "How We Do It" (Rico Rossi featuring B-Legit, Paul Wall & Baby Bash) | 2015 | – | Non-album single |
| "Wakin' Up" (Rico Rossi) | 2016 | – | Non-album single |
| "Quake" (Rico Rossi featuring Marty Obey) | 2017 | – | Non-album single |
| "Too Cold" (Rico Rossi featuring Idrise & Don Chino) | 2017 | 12 | Non-album single |
| "Too Cold (Culo Spanish Remix)" (Rico Rossi featuring Locura & Don Chino) | 2017 | – | Non-album single |
| "Bottles on Me" (Rico Rossi featuring B-Legit & Idrise) | 2017 | – | Non-album single |
| "Higher" (Rico Rossi featuring Keak da Sneak & Abrina) | 2017 | – | Non-album single |
| "Bottles on Me (DJ Seip Remix)" (Rico Rossi featuring B-Legit & Idrise) | 2017 | 21 | Non-album single |
| "Money Over Everything" (Rico Rossi featuring Kirko Bangz & Chris Notez) | 2017 | – | Non-album single |
"—" denotes a recording that did not chart or was not released in that territory.

==== As featured artist ====
List of singles as featured artist, with selected chart positions, showing year released and album name
| Title | Year | Peak chart positions | Album |
| Title | Year | GER | Album |
|---|---|---|---|
| "Do It" (Tania Ponce featuring Rico Rossi) | 2015 | – | Non-album single |
| "Bounce That" (DJ Siesto & Rico Rossi featuring Marty Obey & Nomii) | 2016 | – | Non-album single |
"—" denotes a recording that did not chart or was not released in that territory.

==== Promotional singles ====
List of promotional singles, showing year released and album name
| Title | Year | Album |
|---|---|---|
| "In The Morning" (Rico Rossi featuring Beeda Weeda, New Boyz, Bobby Brackins) | 2013 | Non-album single |
