= Promise Ring (song) =

2007 single by Tiffany Evans

Single by Tiffany Evans featuring Ciara

from the album Tiffany Evans
- Released: May 29, 2007
- Length: 4:27
- Label: Columbia
- Songwriters: Ezekiel Lewis; J. Que; Balewa Muhhammad; Candice Nelson; Brian "B-Nasty" Reid; Michael Crooms
- Producers: Mr. Collipark; The Clutch; Reid

Tiffany Evans singles chronology
"Let Me Be Your Angel" (2005)	"Promise Ring" (2007)	"I'm Grown" (2008)

Ciara singles chronology
"Like a Boy" (2007)	"Promise Ring" (2007)	"Can't Leave 'em Alone" (2007)

"Promise Ring" is the debut single by American R&B singer Tiffany Evans from her self-titled debut album (2007), featuring fellow singer Ciara. The song was produced by Mr. Collipark and The Clutch. It was officially released to iTunes on May 29, 2007. Once released, the song began to receive airplay on mainstream radio stations. It is Evans' most successful single to date.

== Music video ==
A music video for "Promise Ring," directed by Fat Cats, mainly features Tiffany Evans dancing along with Ciara in the background. In the beginning, Evans is seen checking her MySpace page at her house with a television screen showing Ciara. Afterwards, Tiffany Evans does a dance routine ending with a guy putting a "Promise Ring" necklace around her neck. The video was also placed at number ninety-six on BET's Notarized: Top 100 Videos of 2007 countdown.

== Track listing ==
US Vinyl, 12"

- A1 Promise Ring [Radio Version] 3:57 Featuring Ciara
- A2 Promise Ring [Instrumental] 4:27
- B1 Promise Ring [Album Version] 4:27 Featuring Ciara
- B2 Promise Ring [A Capella] 4:26 Featuring Ciara

== Chart ==
Weekly chart performance for "Promise Ring"
Chart (2007)	Peak position
US Bubbling Under Hot 100 (Billboard)	1
US Pop Airplay (Billboard)	66
