= The D.E.Y. =

American Latin hip hop group

- Origin: South Bronx, New York City, New York, United States; Puerto Rico
- Genres: Hip hop, Latin, pop, R&B
- Years active: 2006–present
- Label: Sony BMG/Epic/Koch
- Members: Divine; Élan; Yeyo

The D.E.Y. is a Latin hip hop group that formed in 2007. The group is composed of members Divine, Élan, and Yeyo.

== Discography ==
=== Albums ===
- The DEY Has Come EP (2007)
- The DEY Has Come LP (2008) (Asia Exclusive)

=== Singles ===
Year	Title	Album	Chart positions				
Year	Title	Album	U.S.	U.S. R&B	Pop 100	Rhythmic Top 40	Hot Rap Tracks
2006	"Walk Away (Remember Me)" (Paula DeAnda feat. The D.E.Y.)	Paula DeAnda	18	—	10	8	—
2007	"Give You the World"	The DEY Has Come EP	—	31	—	29	22
2008	"There's Nothin' (Remix)" (Sean Kingston featuring Juelz Santana and The D.E.Y.)	Sean Kingston	60	63	33	30	—
2008	"I Need You"/"She Said"	The DEY Has Come	—	42	—	50	—
2008	"Macarena (The Art of Sound Group Mix)"	Quinceañera Macarena	—	—	—	—	—
