= I'm Grown =

Single by Tiffany Evans featuring Bow Wow

from the album Tiffany Evans
- Released: January 12, 2008
- Recorded: 2007
- Genre: R&B, hip hop
- Length: 3:36 (radio version); 3:59 (album version)
- Label: Columbia
- Songwriters: Crystal "Cristyle" Johnson; Rodney Jerkins; Shad Moss; Dernst Mile II; LaShawn Daniels; Rahman Lang; Rico Love
- Producers: Rodney Jerkins; D'Mile

Tiffany Evans singles chronology
"Promise Ring" (2007)	"I'm Grown" (2008)	"Spotlight" (2009)

Bow Wow singles chronology
"Hey Baby (Jump Off)" (2007)	"I'm Grown" (2008)	"Marco Polo" (2008)

"I'm Grown" is the second single from American singer Tiffany Evans' self-titled debut studio album, Tiffany Evans (2008). The song was produced by Rodney Jerkins and features American rapper Bow Wow. The song also appears on the soundtrack, iCarly: Music from and Inspired by the Hit TV Show.

== Personnel ==
- A&R – Chad Elliott
- Mastered By – James Cruz
- Recorded By, Mixed By – Roberto “Tito” Vazquez

== Charts ==
Chart (2008)	Peak position
U.S. Billboard Hot R&B/Hip-Hop Songs	99

== Release history ==
Release dates and formats for "I'm Grown"
Region	Date	Format	Label(s)	Ref.
United States	February 19, 2008	Mainstream airplay	Columbia	
