= Tiffany Evans =

American singer-songwriter and actress (born 1992)

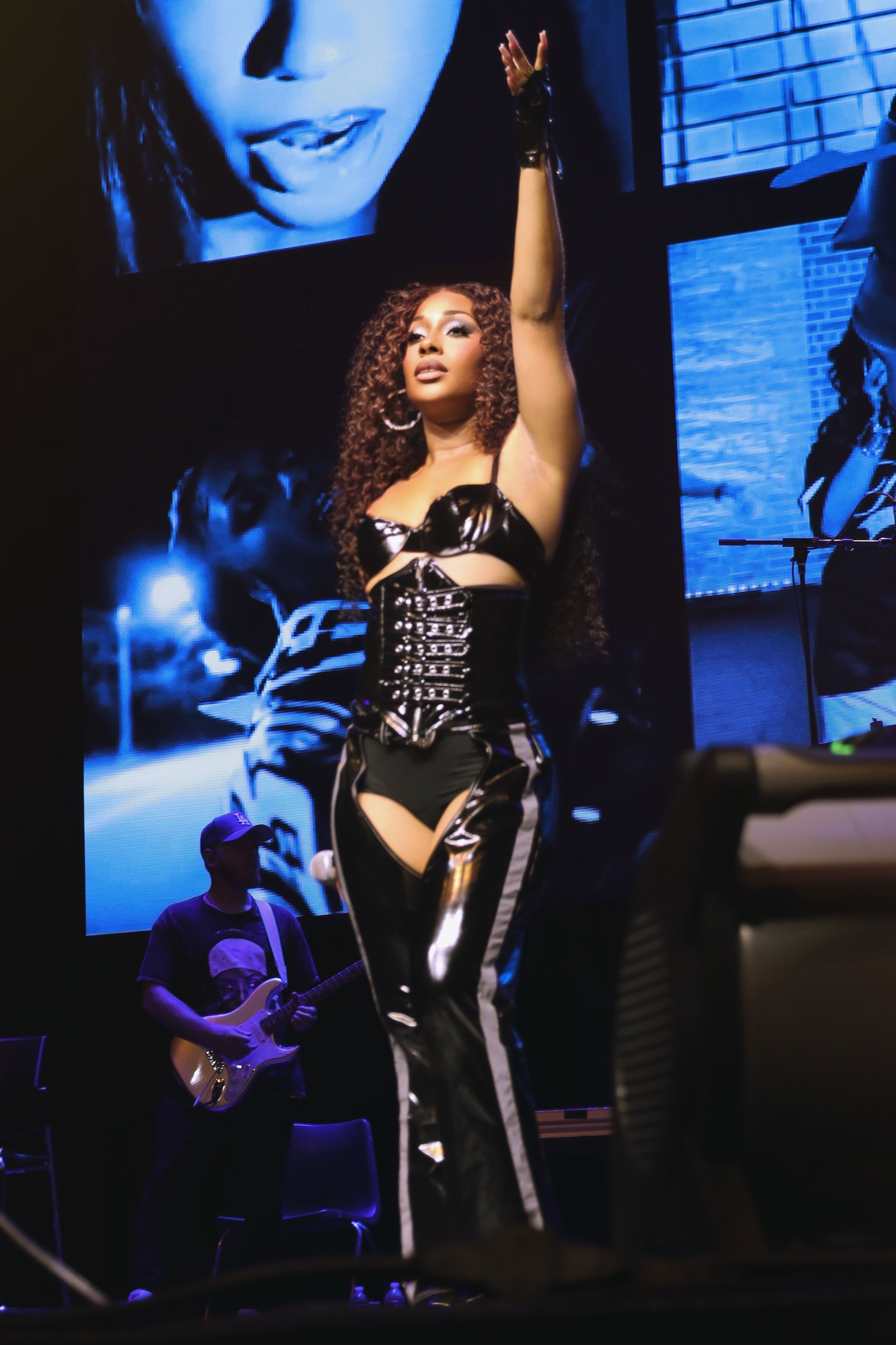
- Evans performing at Love Scene ATL 2025
- Born: August 4, 1992 (age 34); South Bronx, New York, U.S.
- Occupations: Singer-songwriter; actress
- Years active: 2003–present
- Spouse: Lorenzo Henderson (m. 2010; div. 2018)
- Children: 2
- Musical career
- Genres: R&B; soul; hip hop
- Instrument: Vocals
- Labels: Columbia (2004–2011); Music World Entertainment (2010–2011); Live Love Entertainment (2012–present)
- Website: tiffanynow.com

Tiffany Evans (born August 4, 1992) is an American singer, songwriter, and actress. Evans rose to fame in 2003 as a contestant on Star Search (hosted by Arsenio Hall), she became the first contestant in Star Search history to earn a perfect score on all of her performances. Following Evans' victory, she signed a record deal with Columbia Records in the same year. Her self-titled debut album was released in 2008 and included the singles "Promise Ring" featuring Ciara and "I'm Grown" featuring Bow Wow.

== Life and career ==
=== 1992–2006: Early life and Tiffany Evans EP ===
Evans was born in the Bronx of New York City. She got her first break on Showtime at the Apollo at the age of 9. In February 2003, in her Star Search appearance, Evans won the Grand Champion title in the junior singer division, becoming the only performer in Star Search history to receive perfect five scores on all of her appearances. In the competition, Evans competed against fellow singers Lisa Tucker, David Archuleta and Tori Kelly, who later appeared on American Idol. Evans has starred in an episode of Law & Order: SVU, playing actor Blair Underwood's daughter. That same year, she sang for executives at Columbia Records and was offered a recording contract deal at 10 years old. With her musical career already on the upswing, she landed a small role on CBS's The District. In 2005, Evans made her feature film debut in Tyler Perry's Diary of a Mad Black Woman as Brian Simmons' daughter, played by Perry himself. She also contributed to the movie soundtrack on "Father, Can You Hear Me" featuring Cheryl Pepsii Riley, Tamela Mann, Terrell Carter, and Anya Washington.

After signing with Columbia Records, her first single "Let Me Be Your Angel", a cover of Stacy Lattisaw's song was released in 2004 with a music video. The song was a minor R&B hit, peaking at No. 95 on the Billboard Hot 100 chart. Soon after, her self-titled debut EP featuring eight tracks (all covers) and a bonus DVD was released. One additional single "The Christmas Song" was digitally released, as well as her rendition of "The Star-Spangled Banner". The album soon became scarce, as it was made available for a limited time at online retailers as well as the clothing store Limited Too. She began work on a new album, with a couple of digital singles (2005's "Thinkin' About" and 2006's "Who I Am") released.

=== 2007–2011: Tiffany Evans, marriage and departure from Columbia Records ===
On May 29, 2007, Evans released "Promise Ring" featuring Grammy-winning R&B singer Ciara as the lead single for her self-titled debut album. The Mr. Collipark produced track peaked at No. 1 on the U.S. Billboard Bubbling Under Hot 100 chart. It also charted at No. 66 on the U.S. Billboard Hot R&B/Hip-Hop Songs. Evans' second single, "I'm Grown" featuring Bow Wow was released on January 22, 2008. Evans' debut album Tiffany Evans was released April 22, 2008 via Columbia Records. Evans worked with a number of prominent producers including Rodney Jerkins, Soulshock & Karlin, The Clutch, Mr. Collipark and RedOne.

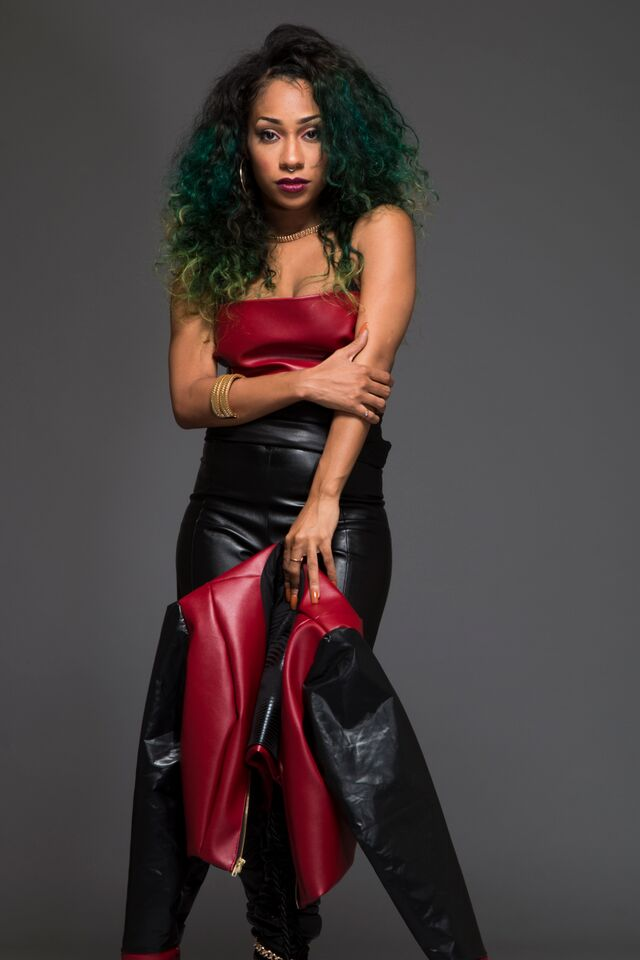
Evans in 2015

Not too long after her debut album release, Evans began working on her second album. After signing a management deal with Mathew Knowles of Music World Entertainment, Evans released "I'll Be There" on October 18, 2010 as the lead single off her second album titled Perfect Imperfection. She premiered the official video on BET's 106 & Park on January 18, 2011 as the "New Joint of the Day". Unfortunately, promotion for the album was ceased after Evans announced on March 29, 2011 her departure from Music World Entertainment and Columbia Records. Following her departure, Evans started her own company called Little Lady Enterprises, which served as her independent label. On October 1, 2011 Tiffany Evans released a buzz single entitled "Won't Find Me" to give fans a feel of the music that she is preparing to bring to the table while doing everything independently. The single was followed by a video as well.

=== 2012–2015: Motherhood, 143, and All Me ===
On June 8, 2012, Evans announced in an interview with Essence.com, that she had been married for one year and nine months and was expecting a child with her husband, Lorenzo Henderson. Evans and her husband welcomed their baby girl, Adalia Henderson, on September 25, 2012. Along with the news of her marriage and pregnancy, Evans also released her first single "If You Love Me", a powerful R&B ballad, from her mixtape 143. The mixtape was released on February 12, 2013.

On November 4, 2014, Evans released "Baby Don't Go" as a buzz single as she worked on her new EP. The music video, co-starring actor Columbus Short was released on January 16, 2015. The song was featured in an episode of Love & Hip Hop: New York. Evans launched her eyewear company Eye Hunee in December 2014. On April 13, 2015 a new single "Red Wine" was released via Live Love. On June 22, Evans released "On Sight" featuring Fetty Wap as the first single from her All Me EP. The song was co-written by Evans and Rahim "GoToWrites" Roberts. All Me was scheduled to release in fall 2015 via Evans' label Live Love Entertainment.

=== 2020–present: Jawan x Tiffany ===
In summer 2020, Evans formed an R&B duo with Jawan Harris called Jawan x Tiffany. On October 23, 2020, they released their first single "Finally". In an interview with Rated R&B, Evans shared the inspiration behind the song. “It was based on the idea of love and where we were in our relationship when we actually first met," she explained. A video, directed by Sean Bankhead, was debuted in February 2021.

== Discography ==
- Tiffany Evans (2008)

== Filmography ==
Film
Year	Title	Role	Notes
2005	Diary of a Mad Black Woman	Tiffany Simmons	
2005	Tarzan II	Voice	End Credits Vocalist

Television
Year	Title	Role	Notes
2003	The District	Singer In Church	Episode: "Ella Mae"
2007	Law & Order: Special Victims Unit	Tessa Sennett	Episode: "Burned"
2017	The Quad	Nail Tech	Episode: "#Quicksand"

== Tours ==
- Screamfest '07 (2007)
- Budweiser Superfest Tour (2010)
