= Sean Kingston discography =

Discography Of Sean Kingston

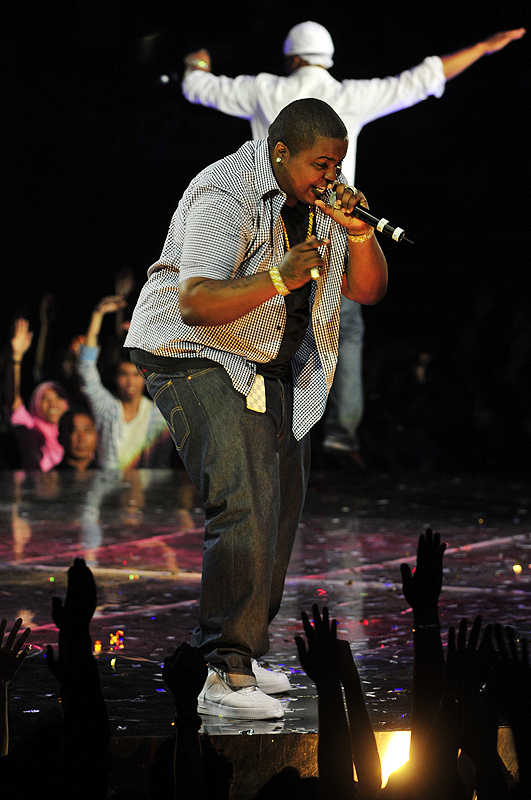
- Studio albums: 4
- Singles: 21
- Music videos: 5
- Mixtapes: 3

The discography of Sean Kingston, a Jamaican American reggae fusion singer, consists of four studio albums, twenty-one singles and five music videos.

His self-titled debut album was released on July 31, 2007, debuted at number 6 on the US Billboard 200 albums chart and was certified platinum for over 1,000,000 shipments in the United States. The album features its lead single, "Beautiful Girls". The song climbed to number 1 on the Billboard Hot 100 in 2007, then was certified 2× multi-platinum by the Recording Industry Association of America (RIAA). The following singles released all made the Hot 100; however, only one failed to make the Top 40 of the charts. The second and third singles, "Me Love" and "Take You There", reached number 14 and 7 on the Hot 100, respectively. Kingston's second album, Tomorrow; was released on September 22, 2009.

== Albums ==
=== Studio albums ===
List of studio albums, with selected chart positions and certifications
Title	Album details	Peak chart positions										Certifications
Title	Album details	US	US R&B	AUS	CAN	FRA	IRE	NL	NZ	SWI	UK	Certifications
Sean Kingston	Released: July 31, 2007; Label: Beluga Heights, Epic, Koch; Format: CD, digital download	6	3	21	—	43	20	91	2	74	8	RIAA: Gold; ARIA: Gold; BPI: Gold; MC: Platinum; IRMA: Gold; RMNZ: Gold
Tomorrow	Released: September 7, 2009; Label: Beluga Heights, Epic; Format: CD, digital download	37	—	—	8	146	—	—	—	—	45	RMNZ: Gold
Back 2 Life	Released: September 10, 2013; Label: Beluga Heights, Epic; Format: CD, digital download	—	33	—	—	—	—	—	—	—	—	
Road to Deliverance	Released: September 28, 2021; Label: Time Is Money, Empire; Format: CD, digital download	—	—	—	—	—	—	—	—	—	—	
"—" denotes a recording that did not chart or was not released in that territory.

== Mixtapes ==
Title	Mixtape details
My Time	Released: 2009; Label: Self-released; Format: CD, digital download
Yesterday	Released: 2010; Label: Self-released; Format: CD, digital download
King of Kingz	Released: February 3, 2011; Label: Self-released; Format: CD, digital download

== Singles ==
=== As lead artist ===
List of singles as lead artist, with selected chart positions and certifications, showing year released and album name
Title	Year	Peak chart positions										Certifications	Album
Title	Year	US	US R&B/HH	AUS	CAN	FRA	GER	IRE	NZ	SWI	UK	Certifications	Album
"Beautiful Girls"	2007	1	12	1	1	2	10	1	1	11	1	RIAA: 2× Platinum; ARIA: Platinum; BPI: 2× Platinum; BVMI: Platinum; MC: 2× Platinum; RMNZ: 6× Platinum	Sean Kingston
"Me Love"	2007	14	—	11	18	—	48	7	3	81	32	RIAA: Gold; ARIA: Platinum; MC: Gold	Sean Kingston
"Take You There"	2007	7	52	34	7	30	53	27	6	76	47	RIAA: Platinum; MC: Gold; RMNZ: Platinum	Sean Kingston
"There's Nothin" (featuring Élan and Juelz Santana)	2008	60	63	85	—	—	—	—	—	—	—	RMNZ: Gold	Sean Kingston
"Fire Burning"	2009	5	— (Note: "Fire Burning" did not enter the Billboard Hot 100, but peaked at number one on the Bubbling Under R&B/Hip-Hop Songs chart.)	48	2	30	56	12	36	50	12	RIAA: 2× Platinum; BPI: Platinum; RMNZ: 2× Platinum	Tomorrow
"Face Drop"	2009	61	—	—	52	—	—	—	7	—	56	RMNZ: Gold	Tomorrow
"Feel It" (with Three 6 Mafia and Flo Rida vs. Tiësto)	2009	78	—	—	33	—	—	39	—	—	—	MC: Gold	Non-album single
"Eenie Meenie" (with Justin Bieber)	2010	15	—	11	14	—	60	12	5	74	9	RIAA: Platinum; BPI: Platinum; ARIA: Platinum; MC: Gold; RMNZ: 2× Platinum	My World 2.0
"Letting Go (Dutty Love)" (featuring Nicki Minaj)	2010	36	51	73	35	—	—	—	23	—	—	RIAA: Platinum; RMNZ: Gold	Non-album singles
"Dumb Love"	2010	84	—	—	92	—	—	—	—	—	—		Non-album singles
"Party All Night (Sleep All Day)"	2010	— (Note: "Party All Night (Sleep All Day)" did not enter the Billboard Hot 100, but peaked at number two on the Bubbling Under Hot 100 chart.)	—	—	55	—	—	25	—	—	9	BPI: Gold	Back 2 Life (Japan edition)
"Back 2 Life (Live It Up)" (featuring T.I.)	2012	— (Note: "Back 2 Life (Live It Up)" did not enter the Billboard Hot 100, but peaked at number nine on the Bubbling Under Hot 100 chart.)	— (Note: "Back 2 Life (Live It Up)" did not enter the Billboard Hot 100, but peaked at number eight on the Bubbling Under R&B/Hip-Hop Songs chart.)	—	52	—	—	—	—	—	—		Back 2 Life
"Rum and Raybans" (featuring Cher Lloyd)	2012	—	—	—	68	—	99	—	—	—	—		Non-album single
"Beat It" (featuring Chris Brown and Wiz Khalifa)	2013	52	17	40	—	116	—	63	25	—	115	ARIA: Gold; RMNZ: Platinum	Back 2 Life
"Wait Up"	2015	—	—	—	—	—	—	—	—	—	—		Non-album singles
"Thank Me"	2016	—	—	—	—	—	—	—	—	—	—		Non-album singles
"All I Got"	2016	—	—	—	—	—	—	—	—	—	—		Non-album singles
"Fall"	2017	—	—	—	—	—	—	—	—	—	—		Non-album singles
"Trust Me"	2017	—	—	—	—	—	—	—	—	—	—		Non-album singles
"Chance" (featuring Vybz Kartel)	2017	—	—	—	—	—	—	—	—	—	—		Non-album singles
"Breather"	2017	—	—	—	—	—	—	—	—	—	—		Non-album singles
"Holding Back"	2017	—	—	—	—	—	—	—	—	—	—		Non-album singles
"Peace of Mind" (featuring Tory Lanez and Davido)	2019	—	—	—	—	—	—	—	—	—	—		Non-album singles
"Vibes Crazy"	2020	—	—	—	—	—	—	—	—	—	—		Non-album singles
"Darkest Times" (featuring G Herbo)	2021	—	—	—	—	—	—	—	—	—	—		Non-album singles
"One by One"	2021	—	—	—	—	—	—	—	—	—	—		Non-album singles
"Love Is Wonderful" (featuring Travis Barker)	2021	—	—	—	—	—	—	—	—	—	—		Non-album singles
"Ocean Drive" (featuring Chris Brown)	2022	—	—	—	—	—	—	—	—	—	—		Non-album singles
"Why Oh Why" (featuring YoungBoy Never Broke Again)	2024	—	—	—	—	—	—	—	—	—	—		Non-album singles
"—" denotes a recording that did not chart or was not released in that territory.

=== As featured artist ===
List of singles as featured artist, with selected chart positions and certifications, showing year released and album name
Title	Year	Peak chart positions									Certifications	Album
Title	Year	US	US R&B/HH	US Rap	AUS	CAN	GER	IRE	NZ	UK	Certifications	Album
"Love Like This" (Natasha Bedingfield featuring Sean Kingston)	2007	11	—	—	77	9	53	34	5	20	RIAA: Platinum; RMNZ: Platinum	Pocketful of Sunshine
"What Is It" (Baby Bash featuring Sean Kingston)	2008	57	— (Note: "What Is It" did not enter the Billboard Hot 100, but peaked at number 16 on the Bubbling Under R&B/Hip-Hop Songs chart.)	12	83	—	—	—	—	—		Cyclone
"That's Gangsta" (Bun B featuring Sean Kingston)	2008	— (Note: "That's Gangsta" did not enter the Billboard Hot 100, but peaked at number 22 on the Bubbling Under Hot 100 chart.)	45	16	—	—	—	—	—	—		II Trill
"I Wanna Luv Ya" (Mafia Clowns featuring Sean Kingston)	2015	—	—	—	—	—	27	—	—	—		Non-album single
"Amore e capoeira" (Takagi & Ketra featuring Giusy Ferreri and Sean Kingston)	2018	—	—	—	—	—	—	—	—	—	FIMI: 5× Platinum; IFPI Swiss: Platinum	Non-album single
"Let Me Hold You" (TOMORO, Sean Kingston)	2021	—	—	—	—	—	—	—	—	—		Non-album single
"Queen of Daytona Beach" (Seaforth featuring Sean Kingston)	2022	—	—	—	—	—	—	—	—	—		What I Get for Loving You
"Rude Boy Love" (LaToya Jane featuring Sean Kingston)	2023	—	—	—	—	—	—	—	—	—		Non-album single
"—" denotes a recording that did not chart or was not released in that territory.

=== Promotional singles ===
List of promotional singles
Title	Year	Album
"Colors 2007"	2007	Sean Kingston

== Other charted songs ==
List of songs, with selected chart positions, showing year released and album name
Title	Year	Peak chart positions				Album
Title	Year	US	US R&B/HH	AUS	CAN	Album
"Personal" (Big Girls Remix) (Fergie featuring Sean Kingston)	2007	—	—	49	—	The Dutchess
"Roll" (Flo Rida featuring Sean Kingston)	2007	61	—	—	43	Mail on Sunday
"On the Corner" (Gorilla Zoe featuring Sean Kingston)	2008	—	— (Note: "On the Corner" did not enter the Hot R&B/Hip-Hop Songs chart, but peaked at number 19 on the Bubbling Under R&B/Hip-Hop Songs chart.)	—	—	I Am Atlanta
"Still in Love" (Girlicious featuring Sean Kingston)	2008	—	—	—	99	Girlicious
"Shawty Tear It Up" (Javon Black featuring Sean Kingston)	2009	—	— (Note: "Shawty Tear It Up" did not enter the Hot R&B/Hip-Hop Songs chart, but peaked at number 20 on the Bubbling Under R&B/Hip-Hop Songs chart.)	—	—	Non-album song
"My Girlfriend"	2009	— (Note: "My Girlfriend" did not enter the Billboard Hot 100, but peaked at number 10 on the Bubbling Under Hot 100 chart.)	—	—	60	Tomorrow
"Wrap U Around Me"	2009	— (Note: "Wrap U Around Me" did not enter the Billboard Hot 100, but peaked at number 23 on the Bubbling Under Hot 100 chart.)	—	—	—	Tomorrow
"Island Queen"	2009	—	—	—	84	Tomorrow
"War"	2009	— (Note: "War" did not enter the Billboard Hot 100, but peaked at number four on the Bubbling Under Hot 100 chart.)	—	—	65	Tomorrow
"For My Hood" (Bow Wow featuring Sean Kingston)	2010	— (Note: "For My Hood" did not enter the Billboard Hot 100, but peaked at number 15 on the Bubbling Under Hot 100 chart.)	— (Note: "For My Hood" did not enter the Hot R&B/Hip-Hop Songs chart, but peaked at number nine on the Bubbling Under R&B/Hip-Hop Songs chart.)	—	—	Lottery Ticket soundtrack
"—" denotes a recording that did not chart or was not released in that territory.

== Guest appearances ==
List of non-single guest appearances, with other performing artists, showing year released and album name
Title	Year	Other artist(s)	Album
"Too Young"	2007	Lil Fizz	none
"Ridin Slow"	2007	Question, Kyle Lee	none
"Doin' Dat"	2007	Clyde Carson	Doin' That
"Like This" (Remix)	2007	Mims, Sha Dirty, Red Cafe, N.O.R.E.	none
"Real D-Boy"	2007	Triple C's	none
"Welcome to My Hood"	2007	Ya Boy	none
"Dollar Bill" (Remix)	2007	Red Cafe, Jermaine Dupri, Juelz Santana, Busta Rhymes	none
"Roll"	2008	Flo Rida	Mail on Sunday
"OG"	2008	Flo Rida	Freestyle Kronikles
"Ghetto Girl"	2008	Mann	
"I'm a Rider"	2008	Hunt	
"Wind & Go Down"	2008	Tony K	By Any Means Necessary
"On the Corner"	2008	Gorilla Zoe	I Am Atlanta
"She Said Stop"	2008	Young Twinn	none
"In Da Club"	2008	Clyde Carson, The Game	none
"Still in Love"	2008	Girlicious	Girlicious
"Off the Meter"	2008	Holly Rae	none
"Yamaha Mama"	2008	Soulja Boy	iSouljaBoyTellem
"Show Out" (Remix)	2008	Unk, Soulja Boy, Jim Jones, E-40	none
"You're the One"	2008	Unk, D'Angelo	2econd Season
"Right Here (Departed)" (Remix)	2009	Brandy	Human
"Follow Me"	2009	Sean Paul	none
"What You Wanna Do"	2010	DMX	none
"Miss Everything"	2010	Sugababes	Sweet 7
"GetAway"	2010	New Breed	none
"Shut the Stage Down"	2010	Soulja Boy	none
"Life Style"	2010	Ace Hood	The Statement
"My Girl"	2010	Honorebel, Trina	Club Scene
"BBM"	2010	Soulja Boy	none
"Fever"	2011	Wisin & Yandel	Los Vaqueros: El Regreso
"Hold You"	2011	Detail	none
"Ready or Not"	2011	Michael Mind Project	State of Mind
"Remember You"	2011	Siti Nurhaliza	All Your Love
"Trophy"	2011	JBar	none
"Swagg Mobb"	2011	Soulja Boy, Young Lo, Kwony Cash	Gold on Deck
"Money"	2012	Soulja Boy	LOUD
"Red Eye"	2013	Soulja Boy	Foreign
"Everybody Hoe"	2013	Soulja Boy	Foreign 2
"Ready to Ride"	2013	Kid Red	REDemption
"Arse Like That"	2013	Dizzee Rascal	The Fifth
"Wake Up In It"	2013	Mally Mall, Tyga, French Montana, Pusha T	Well Done 4
"In Yo Life"	2014	Migos	none
"Michael Jordan"	2014	Soulja Boy	Young Millionaire
"You Already Know"	2014	Soulja Boy, Rich the Kid	Young Millionaire
"Party"	2015	Soulja Boy	none
"Superman"	2015	Soulja Boy	King Soulja 4
"Trap Nigga"	2015	Soulja Boy	King Soulja 4
"Real for You"	2016	Soulja Boy	Rockstar
"Church"	2016	Soulja Boy	S.Beezy 2
"Cuban Link"	2016	Soulja Boy, Lil 100	none
"Trial"	2016	Soulja Boy	King Soulja 7
"All I Do Is Flex"	2018	Soulja Boy	King
"Ugh!"	2019	Soulja Boy	none
"Red Beam"	2020	Trippie Redd	Pegasus
"Do or Die"	2020	Drakeo the Ruler	We Know the Truth (Deluxe)
"Here We Go Again"	2021	Relm Diggie, Fedarro, Bizzy Bone, Twista	none
