= Everyone (Olympics song) =

2010 single by five artists

Single by Jody Williams, Sean Kingston, Tabitha Nauser, Stevie Appleton and Jessica Mauboy
- Released: 14 June 2010
- Length: 3:40
- Songwriter: Ken Lim
- Producer: Ken Lim

Jody Williams singles chronology
| "Wind It" (2009) | "Everyone" (2010) | "This Christmas" (2011) |

Sean Kingston singles chronology
| "Eenie Meenie" (2010) | "Everyone" (2010) | "Letting Go (Dutty Love)" (2010) |

Tabitha Nauser singles chronology
| "Everyone" (2010) | "Bulletproof" (2017) |

Stevie Appleton singles chronology
| "City Won't Sleep" (2009) | "Everyone" (2010) | "Sparks" (2011) |

Jessica Mauboy singles chronology
| "Let Me Be Me" (2009) | "Everyone" (2010) | "Get 'Em Girls" (2010) |

"Everyone" is the official theme song of the 2010 Summer Youth Olympics held in Singapore from 14 to 26 August 2010. The song was sung by five artistes, namely Sean Kingston, Tabitha Nauser, Jody Williams, Stevie Appleton and Jessica Mauboy, each representing one of the five continents of the world. It was written and produced by Singaporean producer and composer Ken Lim.

The song premiered worldwide on 30 May 2010, with a total length of 3 minutes and 40 seconds, and it was complemented by a music video six seconds longer than the song. "Everyone" was released as a CD single only in Singapore on 14 June 2010. Traditionally, the modern Olympic Games has always featured theme song specifically for each games, typically sung by a singer of the host country. Everyone was the first ever theme song for the Youth Olympic Games (YOG), in what the Singapore Youth Olympic Games Organising Committee (SYOGOC) said would create "a global anthem for today's youth". Everyone was not the only song created for the games; the Singapore Sports Council was involved in the production of cheer songs for Singaporeans.

== Background ==
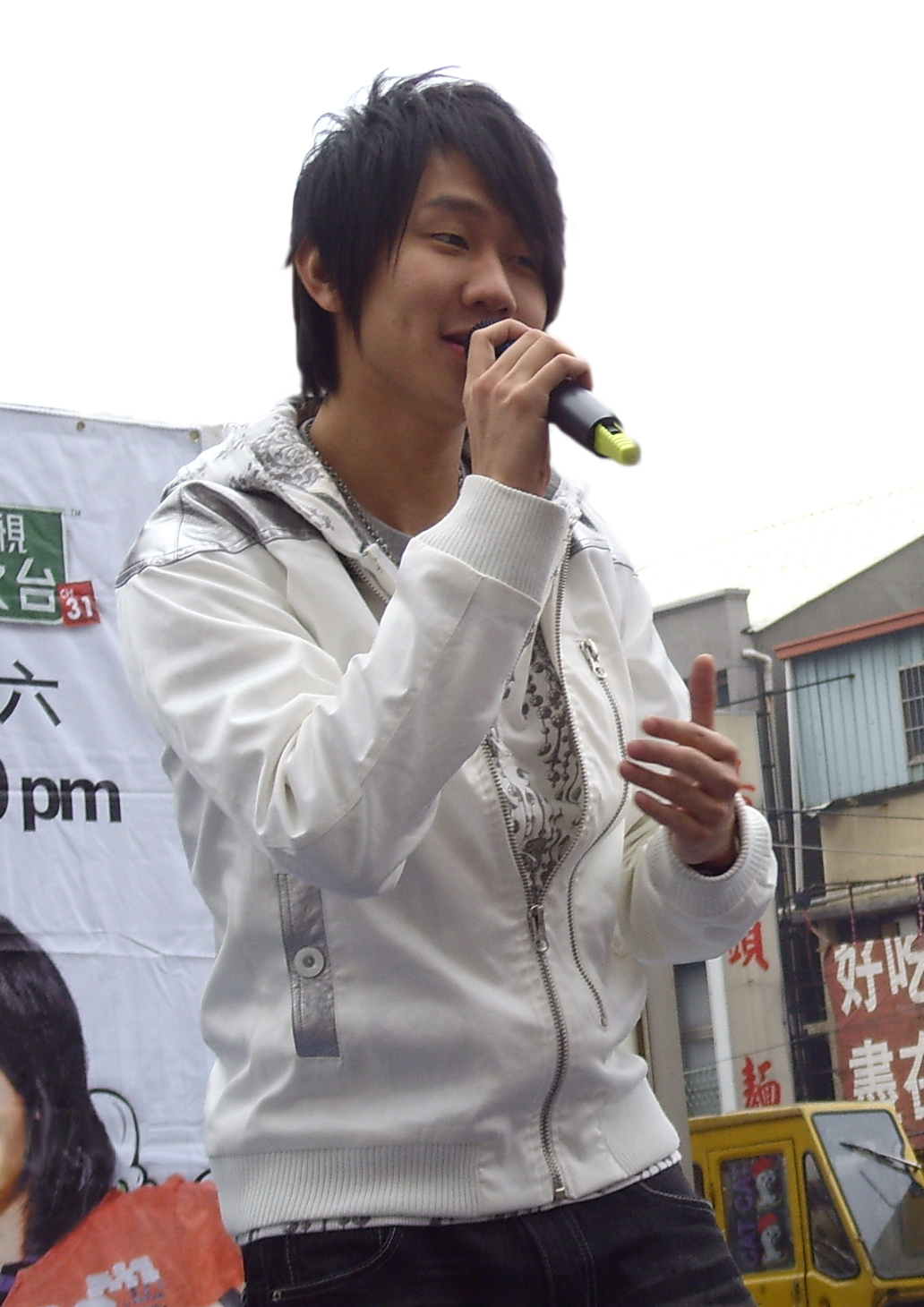
Local artiste JJ Lin specially composed and performed the first cheer song in the series

Most of the Olympic Games in contemporary years have featured a song(s), many of which were branded the official theme song of the games. Typically, the songs would be sung by an artiste from the host country, centering upon a theme related to the Olympics or the spirit of the games. Many of these songs have gone on to do well in music charts, the most recent example before Everyone being that of I Believe by Nikki Yanofsky, which topped the Canadian Hot 100 list dated 27 February 2010.

The tradition of carrying a song alongside the games continued with the inaugural Youth Olympic Games, much as it was a departure from the senior Olympics. SYOGOC was quoted to be confident that the song and its music video "will hit the right notes". Additionally, Teo Ser Luck, Senior Parliamentary Secretary for Community Development, Youth and Sports commented that through the song, "more people will take notice of Youth Olympic Games. We need that excitement and publicity, definitely, for Youth Olympic Games to be successful."

=== Cheer songs ===
Everyone was not the only song released for the 2010 Summer Youth Olympics. It was to be accompanied by a series of three cheer songs as announced by the Singapore Sports Council, unveiled under the common tag Cheer Singapore and targeted at Singaporeans. The first cheer song, You Are The One Singapore, was released in April 2010 and had been specially composed and performed by local artiste JJ Lin. An accompanying music video with choreographed cheer movements was also launched, featuring sports icons Ang Peng Siong and C. Kunalan together with Singaporean athletes Tao Li and twins Nicole and Tabitha Tay. The music video was frequently aired on local television during commercial breaks. As of October 2010, only one out of the three intended cheer songs have been released.

Reception to the first cheer song however ranged from neutral to negative, with netizens slamming them on various online forums and portals. A Facebook group specifically created to denounce You Are The One Singapore was also created, which garnered more than 15,000 fans. Countering the tirade, some netizens commented on Singaporeans' tendency to "complain about every single thing but don't do anything about it". In addition, Singapore Sports Council CEO Oon Jin Teik challenged Singaporeans to come up with a YOG cheer of their own (which had to be accompanied by a YouTube video). The local The New Paper started a contest for readers to submit cheers, which eventually received five submissions, including one from former beauty queen Ris Low.

== Music video ==
A screenshot of the "Everyone" music video

The song was released together with a music video, which was shot entirely in Singapore. The three-minute and 46-second video showcased the five singers of the song performing in front of iconic Singapore backdrops such as The Float@Marina Bay, the Singapore Flyer and the Marina Barrage. The video also showcased montages of young national athletes competing in various sports. A press release noted that it served to celebrate the Olympic values of Excellence, Friendship and Respect.

== Composition ==
In addition, guitars and cellos were used to supplement the song in its composition.

The song was sung by five different artistes each representing his or her continent:

- Africa - (South Africa) Jody Williams, winner in 2007 season of South African Idol, a South African pop/R&B singer.
- America - (United States) Sean Kingston, a U.S. rapper and reggae fusion singer.
- Asia - Tabitha Nauser, 2nd runner-up in 2009 season of Singapore Idol.
- Europe - (United Kingdom) Stevie Appleton, a British singer, songwriter and record producer.
- Oceania - (Australia) Jessica Mauboy, runner-up in 2006 season of Australian Idol, an Australian R&B/pop singer-songwriter.

== Performance ==
The five singers were involved in various previews of Everyone. All reunited in Singapore to perform the song live at the opening ceremony of the games on 14 August 2010, except for Sean Kingston. Rumours had it that Kingston was not in the country due to settlement fee issues. However, it was reported that the real issue was that of a passport mix-up.

== Credits and personnel ==
- Vocals: Jody Williams, Sean Kingston, Tabitha Nauser, Stevie Appleton and Jessica Mauboy
- Executive producer: Ken Lim
- Music and lyrics: Ken Lim
- Music arrangement and guitars: Adam Lee
- Mixing and recording: Derek Zuzarte (thewhitehyperoom)
- Mastering: Bob Ludwig (Gateway Mastering Studios U.S.A)
- Additional guitars: Stevie Appleton
- String section
- 1st Violins: Kong Zhao Hui, Gu Wen Li, Sui JingJing, Chen Da Wei, Wei Zhe, Duan Yu Ling and Cindy Lee
- 2nd Violins: Zhang Zhen Shan, Yin Shu Zhan, Ling Yun Zhi, Xu Jue Yi, Zhou Yu Ping, William Tan Violas Shu Bing, Guan Qi, Liu Hao Yu, Jiang Han Song and Gu Bing Jie
- Cellos: Wang Yan, Zhao Yu Er and Guo Hao

== Charts ==
"Everyone" was released as a CD single only in Singapore, and hence was only eligible for charting on Singaporean radio. The song reached a peak of #1 on the 987FM Top 20, a singles airplay chart in Singapore, on 13 August 2010. It remained on the top spot for two weeks in total.

== See also ==
- You and Me, official theme song of the 2008 Summer Olympics
- I Believe, a song used in the 2010 Winter Olympics
