= Me Love =

2007 single by Sean Kingston

Single by Sean Kingston

from the album Sean Kingston
- Released: July 31, 2007
- Recorded: 2007
- Genre: Reggae fusion
- Length: 3:24
- Label: Beluga Heights
- Songwriters: John Bonham; John Paul Jones; Jimmy Page; Robert Plant; J.R. Rotem; Kisean Anderson
- Producer: J.R. Rotem

Sean Kingston singles chronology
"Beautiful Girls" (2007)	"Me Love" (2007)	"Love Like This" (2007)

"Me Love" is the second single by Sean Kingston from his self-titled debut album, the song was produced by J.R. Rotem and interpolates Led Zeppelin's song "D'yer Mak'er" from their 1973 album Houses of the Holy.

In August 2007, the song debuted at number 28 on the U.S. Billboard Hot 100, making it the Hot Shot Debut of the week. In the same week, Kingston's previous single, "Beautiful Girls", was number one on the chart; This made Kingston the second artist in 2007 to have both the number one single and the Hot Shot Debut in one week (Beyoncé had achieved this with "Irreplaceable" and "Listen" in January of that year). In its second week on the chart, the single rose to number 15 and was the greatest digital gainer on the Hot 100 that week.

== Track listing ==
CD Single

1. "Me Love" - 3:24
2. "Colors (2007)" (Reggae Remix) - 4:34
3. "Your Sister" - 3:30

Australian CD Single

1. "Me Love" (Album Version) - 3:22
2. "Beautiful Girls" (Album Version) - 3:44

UK CD Single

1. "Me Love" (Album Version) - 3:22
2. "No Woman, No Cry" (Bob Marley cover) - 3:44

== Charts ==
=== Weekly charts ===
Chart (2007–2008)	Peak position
Australia (ARIA)	11
Australian Urban (ARIA)	5
Austria (Ö3 Austria Top 40)	56
Belgium (Ultratip Bubbling Under Wallonia)	21
Canada Hot 100 (Billboard)	18
Czech Republic Airplay (ČNS IFPI)	16
Denmark (Tracklisten)	26
European Hot 100 Singles (Billboard)	77
Germany (GfK)	48
Hungary (Rádiós Top 40)	14
Ireland (IRMA)	7
New Zealand (Recorded Music NZ)	3
Romania (Romanian Top 100)	14
Slovakia Airplay (ČNS IFPI)	11
Sweden (Sverigetopplistan)	50
Switzerland (Schweizer Hitparade)	81
UK Singles (Official Charts)	32
US Billboard Hot 100	14
US Latin Pop Airplay (Billboard)	35
US Pop Airplay (Billboard)	11

=== Year-end charts ===
Chart (2008)	Position
Hungary (Rádiós Top 40)	37

== Certifications ==
Region	Certification	Certified units/sales
Australia (ARIA)	Platinum	70,000^{^}
Canada (Music Canada)	Gold	20,000^{*}
United States (RIAA)	Gold	500,000^{^}
^{*} Sales figures based on certification alone.^{^} Shipments figures based on certification alone.
