= Dumb Love =

Single by Sean Kingston
- Released: September 7, 2010
- Recorded: 2010
- Genre: Pop; R&B
- Length: 3:06
- Label: Epic; Beluga Heights
- Songwriters: Ari Levine; Philip Lawrence; Bruno Mars; Steven Battey; Carlos Battey; Clarence Quick
- Producers: The Smeezingtons; the Jackie Boyz

Sean Kingston singles chronology
"Letting Go (Dutty Love)" (2010)	"Dumb Love" (2010)	"Party All Night (Sleep All Day)" (2010)

"Dumb Love" is a song by American recording artist Sean Kingston. The song was originally released as the third single from Kingston's third studio album, Back 2 Life, but was taken off for unknown reasons. It was released on September 7, 2010, as a digital download in the United States. It peaked at number 84 on the Billboard Hot 100 and 92 on the Canadian Hot 100. The song rose to popularity due to Sean's appearance and performance of the song on The Suite Life on Deck. The song was written by Steven Battey and Carlos Battey and the Smeezingtons (Ari Levine, Philip Lawrence, and Bruno Mars). The song's chorus interpolates elements from "Come Go With Me" (1957) by the Del-Vikings, as written by Clarence Quick.

== Background ==
The single was released on iTunes on September 7, 2010. Kingston sang the song on The Suite Life on Deck episode "Party On!", which he guest starred on, in order to win London Tipton's affection.

== Track listing ==
Digital download #1
No.	Title	Length
1.	"Dumb Love"	3:06

Digital download #2
No.	Title	Length
1.	"Dumb Love" (Radio Disney Version)	3:06

== Chart performance ==
Chart (2010)	Peak position
Canada (Canadian Hot 100)	92
US Billboard Hot 100	84

== Release history ==
Country	Date	Type	Label
United States	September 7, 2010	Digital download #1	Sony Music Entertainment
United States	November 11, 2010	Digital download #2	Sony Music Entertainment
