= Sparks (Stevie Appleton song) =

Single by Stevie Appleton

from the album Colours
- Released: July 20, 2011
- Genre: Pop
- Label: Lucky Busker Limited

Stevie Appleton singles chronology
"Everyone" (2010)	"Sparks" (2011)

"Sparks" is a song by English pop singer-songwriter Stevie Appleton from his second studio album, Colours. The track was released on July 20, 2011, and is marketed as the lead single from his Colours album.

== Track listing ==
Digital download

1. "Sparks" - 3:08

== Chart performance ==
The single has peaked at #21 in Japan and it has reached #4 in the country's national airplay chart. The album Colours charted at 24 according to the official Oricon chart.

== Charts ==
Chart (2011)	Peak position
Japan (Japan Hot 100)	21

== Release history ==
Country	Date	Format
Japan	July 20, 2011	Digital download
