= Rum and Raybans =

Single by Sean Kingston featuring Cher Lloyd
- Released: November 16, 2012
- Recorded: 2012
- Genre: EDM; synthpop
- Length: 3:32
- Label: Epic; Beluga Heights
- Songwriters: Cameron Forbes; Sean Kingston; Cher Lloyd
- Producer: The Elev3n

Sean Kingston singles chronology
"Back 2 Life (Live It Up)" (2012)	"Rum and Raybans" (2012)	"Beat It" (2013)

Cher Lloyd singles chronology
"Oath" (2012)	"Rum and Raybans" (2012)	"With Ur Love (U.S.)" (2013)

Music video
- "Rum and Raybans" on YouTube

"Rum and Raybans" is a song by American singer Sean Kingston, featuring vocals from British singer Cher Lloyd. Written by Cameron Forbes and produced by "The Elev3n", the song was originally released as the second single from Kingston's third studio album, Back 2 Life but was scrapped due to poor charting and promotion. It was released on November 16, 2012 as a digital download, in both a clean and an explicit version, and then again on July 6, 2018 as an EP including the acapella and instrumental versions of the track.

== Music video ==
A lyric video was uploaded to YouTube on October 16, 2012. The music video, directed by Hannah Lux Davis, was released November 18, 2012. It shows Kingston partying with other people but Lloyd does not appear in the video. Chris Brown makes a cameo appearance.

== Track listing ==
No.	Title	Length
1.	"Rum and Raybans (Clean Version)" (featuring Cher Lloyd)	3:32
2.	"Rum and Raybans" (featuring Cher Lloyd)	3:32
3.	"Rum and Raybans (Instrumental Version)" (featuring Cher Lloyd)	3:30
4.	"Rum and Raybans (Acappella Version)" (featuring Cher Lloyd)	3:29
Total length:		14:05

== Charts ==
Chart (2012–13)	Peak position
Canada (Canadian Hot 100)	68
Germany (GfK)	99
South Korea International Singles (Gaon)	94
US Hot Dance Club Songs (Billboard)	5
Russia Airplay (Tophit)	170

== Release history ==
Release history for "Rum and Raybans"
Region	Date	Format	Version	Label
Various	18 November 2012	Digital download; streaming	Single	Epic Records
Various	6 July 2018	Digital download; streaming	EP	Epic Records
