= Take You There (Sean Kingston song) =

2007 single by Sean Kingston

Single by Sean Kingston

from the album Sean Kingston
- Released: October 23, 2007
- Recorded: 2007
- Genre: R&B; synthpop
- Length: 3:56
- Label: Beluga Heights; Epic; Koch
- Songwriters: Kisean Anderson; Johnathan Rotem; Evan "Kidd" Bogart; Timothy & Theron Thomas
- Producer: J. R. Rotem

Sean Kingston singles chronology
"Big Girls Don't Cry (Remix)" (2005)	"Take You There" (2007)	"What Is It" (2007)

"Take You There" is the third single by Sean Kingston from his debut album Sean Kingston. It was produced by J. R. Rotem. The song was co-written by Kingston, Rotem, Evan "Kidd" Bogart, Rock City, and Eric Bluebaum. The song is about Kingston taking his girlfriend on a date to the West Indies, particularly his native Jamaica. As he told noted UK urban writer Pete Lewis of Blues & Soul in June 2007: "In 'Take You There' I'm basically telling a girl 'Let me take you to where I'm from - to Jamaica, to the paradise and to the slums!'. Because, while many people just think of the tropical beaches, there is definitely another, rugged side to the island too!" The song was originally supposed to be Kingston's debut single in early May 2007, but "Beautiful Girls" became his debut single on May 26, 2007.

On the issue date of November 17, 2007, the single debuted on the Billboard Hot 100 at number 81 and eventually peaked at number 7.

Kingston later was a featured vocalist on the Kidz Bop Kids' version of the song, a rare instance of the Kidz Bop version of a song featuring the original artist.

== Music video ==
The video (directed Gil Green) was shot in Miami, and features cameos by Rick Ross, J. R. Rotem, DJ Khaled and Gunplay. Kingston's girlfriend is played by fashion model Kirby Griffin. In the music video version, "sip piña coladas" is censored because of the reference to alcohol, while left intact on radio stations.

The Kidz Bop version is entirely different: it begins with the kids patiently waiting in a beach hut, stone-faced. Kingston arrives in a silver car, walking out of a nearby beach house, causing the kids to come rushing over. A majority of the music video is spent on shore; it ends with Kingston leaving in the car from earlier as the kids wave goodbye to him. It was released exclusively to Music Choice.

== Charts ==
=== Weekly charts ===
Chart (2007–2008)	Peak position
Australia (ARIA)	34
Australian Urban (ARIA)	10
Belgium (Ultratip Bubbling Under Wallonia)	19
Canada Hot 100 (Billboard)	7
CIS Airplay (TopHit)	32
Czech Republic Airplay (ČNS IFPI)	39
France (SNEP)	1
France (SNEP)	30
Germany (GfK)	53
Hungary (Rádiós Top 40)	27
Ireland (IRMA)	27
New Zealand (Recorded Music NZ)	6
Romania (Romanian Top 100)	73
Russia Airplay (TopHit)	28
Slovakia Airplay (ČNS IFPI)	11
Switzerland (Schweizer Hitparade)	76
UK Singles (Official Charts)	47
US Billboard Hot 100	7
US Pop Airplay (Billboard)	5
US Hot R&B/Hip-Hop Songs (Billboard)	52
US Rhythmic Airplay (Billboard)	10

=== Year-end charts ===
Chart (2008)	Position
Canada (Canadian Hot 100)	41
CIS (Tophit)	78
Russia Airplay (TopHit)	87
US Billboard Hot 100	34
US Mainstream Top 40 (Billboard)	31
US Rhythmic (Billboard)	36

== Certifications ==
Region	Certification	Certified units/sales
Canada (Music Canada)	Gold	20,000^{*}
New Zealand (RMNZ)	Platinum	30,000^{‡}
United States (RIAA)	Platinum	1,000,000^{*}
Ringtone
United States (RIAA)	Gold	500,000^{*}
^{*} Sales figures based on certification alone.^{‡} Sales+streaming figures based on certification alone.
