= Eenie Meenie =

2010 song by Sean Kingston and Justin Bieber

Single by Sean Kingston and Justin Bieber

from the album My World 2.0
- Released: March 15, 2010
- Recorded: February 6, 2010
- Studio: King of Kings Studio (Miami, Florida)
- Genre: Dance-pop
- Length: 3:24
- Label: Beluga Heights; Island; Epic
- Songwriters: Kisean Anderson; Justin Bieber; Carlos Battey • Steven Battey; Benjamin Levin; Marcos Palacios; Ernest Clark
- Producer: Benny Blanco

Sean Kingston singles chronology
"Feel It" (2009)	"Eenie Meenie" (2010)	"Everyone" (2010)

Justin Bieber singles chronology
"Baby" (2010)	"Eenie Meenie" (2010)	"Never Say Never" (2010)

Music video
- "Eenie Meenie" on YouTube

"Eenie Meenie" is a song by American-Jamaican singer Sean Kingston and Canadian singer Justin Bieber. The song was written by both Kingston and Bieber along with Carlos Battey, Steven Battey, Marcos Palacios and Ernest Clark and Benny Blanco and was produced by the latter. It was originally released as the first single from Kingston's third studio album Back 2 Life on March 15, 2010, but was taken off for unknown reasons. However, it is included on Bieber's first studio album My World 2.0. The song, a dance-pop number with Kingston's reggae influences and Bieber's R&B vocals, is lyrically about an indecisive lover.

The song reached the top ten in the United Kingdom and New Zealand, and the top twenty in Australia, Canada, Ireland and the United States. The accompanying music video features Kingston and Bieber at a pool party at a condo, being pursued by the same girl.

== Background and composition ==
"Eenie Meenie"
A 22-second sample of "Eenie Meenie" featuring vocals from Kingston and Bieber.

The song premiered on March 4, 2010, on Ryan Seacrest's website, and it was released officially on March 23, 2010, in the United States. It is a dance-pop song, with R&B, and reggae fusion influences, written in the key of D♭ major, with a vocal range from F_{3} to D♭_{5}. It moves at 120 beats per minute and is set in common time. The song features a prominent synthesized back beat, followed by verses from both singers, then a rap interlude, while utilizing the children's rhyme "Eenie Meenie Miny Moe."

== Critical reception ==
Kyle Anderson of MTV said that "'Eenie Meenie' melds Sean Kingston's island-inflected dance-pop with Bieber's sweet tween R&B." A reviewer of DJBooth said, "The record’s crown jewel, of course, is the chorus, which will worm its way into your head whether you like it or not." Although he called the song catchy, Chris Richards of The Washington Post said Kingston "hogs the mike" on the song. Rudy Klapper of Sputnikmusic wrote about the lyrics, on the album review, that those are "disturbing", but at the same time "unintentionally hilarious." She also criticized the production: "There's not much to say about the kind of producer who thinks the use of the term 'shorty' with an elementary school gimmick is a good idea." Luke O'Neil from The Boston Globe noted "Sultry reggaeton is repackaged here for the tween set with Sean Kingston's 'Eenie Meenie.' 'Shorty' was never sung so literally."

== Chart performance ==
In the United States "Eenie Meenie" entered the Billboard Hot 100 at number thirty on April 7, 2010, where it was the highest debut of the week. The next week it dropped three places, and stayed there for another additional week. On the Billboard issue dated May 15, 2010, the single reached its peak, at number fifteen, and it was certified platinum by the Recording Industry Association of America. As of February 2011, the single was sold 1,238,000 times. In Australia, it debuted at number forty-nine within the ARIA Top 50 Singles Chart on April 4, 2010, the next week, "Eenie Meenie" reached the number thirty, but it fell out the chart the following week. It re-entered at number forty-five on April 25, 2010, and reached its peak at number eleven on May 30, 2010, where it stayed for three weeks. Later it was certified as gold by the Australian Recording Industry Association. The song appeared in the UK Singles Chart on May 22, 2010, at number fifty-eight. The next week "Eenie Meenie" rose to number seventeen and peaked at number nine in the next two weeks.

In Ireland, it debuted at number forty-one in the Irish Singles Chart on April 15, 2010, and rose the number twelve on May 17, 2010. In the Canadian Hot 100 "Eenie Meenie" debuted and peaked at number fourteen, becoming the highest debut of the week. But in the next issue, the single became the biggest drop, falling to the number thirty-one. It was certified gold by the Canadian Recording Industry Association. In New Zealand it debuted at number thirteen on March 29, 2010, and in its eighth week the song peaked at number five. It also was certified gold by the Recording Industry Association of New Zealand.

== Music video ==
Kingston and Bieber at a party on the balcony of a condominium in the video.

The music video was filmed on March 30, 2010, in Beverly Hills, California, and was directed by Ray Kay, director of Bieber's "Baby" video. On the topic of choosing the lead girl, Kingston told MTV News, "I picked the main girl, basically, because Justin is 16 and I'm 20 years old, so it had to be a girl that fit the both of us, because in the video and song, she's trying to play the both of us. So there had to be a contrast. She fit it perfectly." Additionally, Kingston explained the plot of the video to Rap-Up, commenting, "The video is basically about this girl trying to play both of us and at the end... we end up both at the same place at one time, and she's left with a stupid look on her face." Appearances are made by Bieber's friend, Christian Beadles, as well as rapper Romeo and singer/actress Jasmine Villegas, whose appearance further fueled media speculation Villegas and Bieber were romantically involved after a previous appearance in his music video for 'Baby'. Jocelyn Vena of MTV News reviewed the video, "Here's the play-by-play: While Kingston and the lady in question are flirting out on the deck, Bieber is chilling inside. But, wait — there she is flirting with Bieber while Kingston is hanging out, wondering where she went. The fickle girl eventually leaves Bieber to chill with Kingston, and then — boom — there she is with Bieber again. And, well, you get it. Of course, the 'eenie-meenie-miny-moe lover' eventually gets caught. While she's chatting up Kingston, along comes Bieber, and her game is blown. The dudes are cool with it. Well, they're not cool with her playing them, but they seem to remain friends despite both going for the same girl." As of November 2024, the music video on YouTube has over 738 million views.

== Track listing ==
Digital download
No.	Title	Length
1.	"Eenie Meenie"	3:21

CD single
No.	Title	Length
1.	"Eenie Meenie"	3:21
2.	"Eenie Meenie" (Video)	3:30

== Credits and personnel ==
- Songwriting - Kisean Anderson, Justin Bieber, Benjamin Levin, Carlos Battey, Steven Battey, Marcos Palacios, Ernest Clark
- Production - Benny Blanco
- Drums, keyboards, and programming - Benny Blanco
- Background vocals - Carlos Battey, Steven Battey
- Engineering - Benny Blanco, Sam Holland
- Vocal production and recording - Thaddis Harrell (Bieber's vocals), assisted by Travis Harrington
- Vocal production - Greg Ogan, Steve Siravo
- Production Coordination - Jeremy Levin, Todd Rubenstein, assisted by B. Cough and Dooey
- Mixing - Serban Ghenea, engineered for mix by John Hanes, assisted by Tim Roberts
- Editing - Matt Beckley, assisted by Jimmy James
- Recorded at the King of Kings Studio, Miami, Florida

== Charts ==
=== Weekly charts ===
Chart (2010)	Peak position
Australia (ARIA)	11
Austria (Ö3 Austria Top 40)	64
Belgium (Ultratop 50 Flanders)	47
Belgium (Ultratip Bubbling Under Wallonia)	4
Canada Hot 100 (Billboard)	14
Canada CHR/Top 40 (Billboard)	30
Czech Republic Airplay (ČNS IFPI)	52
European Hot 100 Singles (Billboard)	36
Germany (GfK)	60
Ireland (IRMA)	12
Netherlands (Single Top 100)	95
New Zealand (Recorded Music NZ)	5
Scottish Singles Sales (Official Charts)	9
Slovakia (Rádio Top 100)	41
Sweden (Sverigetopplistan)	52
Switzerland (Schweizer Hitparade)	74
UK Singles (Official Charts)	9
US Billboard Hot 100	15
US Dance Airplay (Billboard)	25
US Pop Airplay (Billboard)	19
US Rhythmic Airplay (Billboard)	15

Chart (2026)	Peak position
Austria (Ö3 Austria Top 40)	35
Germany (GfK)	48
Global 200 (Billboard)	32
Greece International (IFPI)	41
Hong Kong (Billboard)	20
Indonesia (Billboard)	17
Malaysia (IFPI)	7
Malaysia International (RIM)	4
Netherlands (Single Top 100)	45
Norway (IFPI Norge)	36
Panama Streaming (PRODUCE)	159
Philippines (IFPI)	15
Philippines Hot 100 (Billboard Philippines)	15
Portugal (AFP)	66
Singapore (RIAS)	8
Spain (Promusicae)	66
Sweden (Sverigetopplistan)	29
Switzerland (Schweizer Hitparade)	37
Taiwan (Billboard)	8
United Arab Emirates (IFPI)	19
Vietnam Hot 100 (Billboard)	51

=== Year-end charts ===
Chart (2010)	Position
Australia (ARIA)	74
Canada (Canadian Hot 100)	76
New Zealand (Recorded Music NZ)	45
UK Singles (OCC)	97
US Billboard Hot 100	89

== Certifications ==
Region	Certification	Certified units/sales
Australia (ARIA)	Platinum	70,000^{^}
Canada (Music Canada)	Gold	20,000^{*}
Denmark (IFPI Danmark)	Platinum	90,000^{‡}
Germany (BVMI)	Gold	300,000^{‡}
New Zealand (RMNZ)	3× Platinum	90,000^{‡}
Portugal (AFP)	Gold	12,000^{‡}
Spain (Promusicae) (since 2015)	Gold	50,000^{‡}
United Kingdom (BPI)	Platinum	600,000^{‡}
United States (RIAA)	Platinum	1,000,000^{*}
^{*} Sales figures based on certification alone.^{^} Shipments figures based on certification alone.^{‡} Sales+streaming figures based on certification alone.

== Release history ==
Region	Date	Label	Format
United States	March 15, 2010	Beluga Heights, Epic	Airplay
United States	March 23, 2010	Beluga Heights, Epic	CD single
France	March 28, 2010	Beluga Heights, Epic	Digital download
Germany	March 28, 2010	Beluga Heights, Epic	Digital download
United Kingdom	March 28, 2010	Beluga Heights, Epic	Digital download
United States	March 28, 2010	Beluga Heights, Epic	Digital download
Canada	June 29, 2010	Beluga Heights, Epic	Digital download
Japan	June 29, 2010	Beluga Heights, Epic	Digital download
United Kingdom	July 5, 2010	Beluga Heights, Epic	Digital download
