= Fire Burning =

2009 single by Sean Kingston

Single by Sean Kingston

from the album Tomorrow
- Released: April 24, 2009
- Genre: Electropop; dance-pop
- Length: 4:03
- Label: Epic; Geffen; Koch
- Songwriters: Kisean Anderson; Bilal Hajji; RedOne
- Producer: RedOne

Sean Kingston singles chronology
| "There's Nothin" (2008) | "Fire Burning" (2009) | "Face Drop" (2009) |

Music video
- "Fire Burning" on YouTube

Audio sample
- file; help

"Fire Burning" is a song by Jamaican-American singer-songwriter Sean Kingston, released in April 2009 as the lead single from his second studio album Tomorrow. Unlike many of his previous singles, which are all produced by J. R. Rotem, the song is produced by RedOne. The song was used for the opening number of the Miss Universe 2009 live at the Atlantis Paradise Island, Nassau, Bahamas. It was also used in Fred: The Movie where it shows Fred Figglehorn standing up on his bed, singing the song.

== Composition ==
"Fire Burning" is written by Nadir Khayat, Bilal Hajji, and Kisean Anderson. The song is set in common time with a moderate tempo of 123 beats per minute and is written in the key of Db major.

== Release ==
Kingston had released the song on his Myspace webpage to promote it. The song was released to radio stations and for digital download on April 24, 2009. To date the song has been played more than 13 million times on his Myspace page. As of July 22, 2012, the song has sold over 3 million downloads. Sean Kingston performed the song for the first time live at the Teen Choice Awards 2009.

== Music video ==
The music video premiered on MTV on June 15, 2009. Rick Ross makes a cameo appearance in the video along with fellow island singer Iyaz. The video was directed by Gil Green. The video also shows Kingston's Audi R8 in the video.

== Remixes ==
- "Fire Burning" (remix) (featuring Pitbull)
- "Fire Burning" (remix) (featuring Adrian Banton & Pitbull)
- "Fire Burning" (Jody den Broeder remix)
- "Fire Burning" (Jody den Broeder radio edit)
- "Fire Burning" (Dave Audé club mix)
- "Fire Burning" (Dave Audé radio mix)

== Critical reception ==
Michael Menachem of Billboard reviewed the song as "the most danceable single yet" and commented on the fast tempo and Kingston's well-projected vocal "that allows producer RedOne to blend the infectious hook with heavy synthesizers and a variety of percussive sounds that made Lady Gaga's "Poker Face" so striking". He also comments that "the chorus is repetitive, it sounds just like 'Unstoppable' by Kat Deluna, but this song is often what makes for a sizzling club hit". Alex Fletcher of Digital Spy said that 'Fire Burning' has all the makings of a classic summer anthem with its swathes of GaGa-esque synths, infectious chorus hook and fuzzy bassline but he wasn't in favor of Kingston's reggae-tinged vocals.

== Formats and track listings ==
Digital download

1. "Fire Burning" (album version) (Kisean Anderson, Bilal Hajji, RedOne) – 4:03

CD single (Germany)

1. "Fire Burning" – 4:00
2. "War" – 2:59

== Chart performance ==
"Fire Burning" debuted at #29 on the Billboard Hot 100, making it Kingston's highest debut on the chart. Since then it has entered the top ten peaking at #5. It also peaked at number two on the Canadian Hot 100 for eight consecutive weeks. It became a #1 Record in South Africa and holding off strong competition from Lady Gaga's "LoveGame". Prior to this "Fire Burning" was ranked 36th on South Africa's Year-End-Chart.

== Charts ==
=== Weekly charts ===
| Chart (2009) | Peak position |
|---|---|
| Australia (ARIA) | 48 |
| Austria (Ö3 Austria Top 40) | 54 |
| Belgium (Ultratop 50 Flanders) | 29 |
| Canada Hot 100 (Billboard) | 2 |
| Europe (Eurochart Hot 100 Singles) | 28 |
| Finland (Suomen virallinen lista) | 13 |
| France (SNEP) | 13 |
| Germany (Official German Charts) | 56 |
| Hungary (Rádiós Top 40) | 3 |
| Ireland (IRMA) | 12 |
| Japan (Japan Hot 100) | 9 |
| New Zealand (Recorded Music NZ) | 36 |
| Romania (Romanian Top 100) | 46 |
| South African Singles Chart | 1 |
| Sweden (Sverigetopplistan) | 29 |
| Switzerland (Schweizer Hitparade) | 50 |
| Turkey Top 20 Chart | 2 |
| UK Singles (Official Charts) | 12 |
| UK Hip Hop/R&B (Official Charts) | 5 |
| US Billboard Hot 100 | 5 |
| US Adult Pop Airplay (Billboard) | 37 |
| US Bubbling Under R&B/Hip-Hop Songs (Billboard) | 1 |
| US Dance Club Songs (Billboard) | 3 |
| US Dance Airplay (Billboard) | 6 |
| US Latin Pop Airplay (Billboard) | 18 |
| US Pop Airplay (Billboard) | 6 |
| US Rhythmic Airplay (Billboard) | 5 |

=== Year-end charts ===
| Chart (2009) | Position |
|---|---|
| Canada (Canadian Hot 100) | 6 |
| Hungary (Single Top 40) | 25 |
| Japan (Japan Hot 100) | 46 |
| Japan Adult Contemporary (Billboard) | 18 |
| UK Singles (OCC) | 96 |
| US Billboard Hot 100 | 33 |
| US Dance Club Songs | 34 |
| US Mainstream Top 40 | 34 |
| US Rhythmic | 36 |

== Certifications ==
| Region | Certification | Certified units/sales |
|---|---|---|
| New Zealand (RMNZ) | 2× Platinum | 60,000^{‡} |
| United Kingdom (BPI) | Platinum | 600,000^{‡} |
| United States (RIAA) | 2× Platinum | 2,000,000^{*} |
^{*} Sales figures based on certification alone.^{‡} Sales+streaming figures based on certification alone.
