= Letting Go (Dutty Love) =

Single by Sean Kingston featuring Nicki Minaj
- Released: August 3, 2010
- Recorded: 2010
- Genre: Reggae fusion; R&B; synthpop
- Length: 3:51
- Label: Epic; Beluga Heights
- Songwriters: Kisean Anderson; Ester Dean; Mikkel S. Eriksen; Tor Erik Hermansen; Traci Hale; Onika Maraj
- Producer: Stargate

Sean Kingston singles chronology
"Everyone" (2010)	"Letting Go (Dutty Love)" (2010)	"Dumb Love" (2010)

Nicki Minaj singles chronology
"2012 (It Ain't the End)" (2010)	"Letting Go (Dutty Love)" (2010)	"Check It Out" (2010)

"Letting Go (Dutty Love)" is a song by American singer Sean Kingston. It was produced by Stargate, and features rapper Nicki Minaj. The song was originally released as the second single from Kingston's third studio album, Back 2 Life, but was taken off for unknown reasons. As of December 2014, the song has sold 1.1 million copies in the United States.

== Background ==
The song was produced by Stargate and written by Sean Kingston, Ester Dean, Stargate, Traci Hale, and Nicki Minaj who appears on the track. The official remix features rapper Rick Ross. With the release of the song, Kingston commented on how proud he was of his song, calling it his strongest single yet. He stated on Twitter: "Okay, so I never felt so good about ANY of my songs since 'Beautiful Girls' but trust me when I tell YOU... 'Letting Go (Dutty Love)' is a HIT!"

The song was released onto iTunes on June 21, 2010, on "East Coast Digital Radio-Hip-Hop/Rap Podcast/Blog" for a free download as a podcast.

An alternate version of the song exists that appears to be an earlier version of the song. The said version does not feature vocals from Nicki Minaj, which suggests that this was the original version of the song before the Nicki Minaj version had been arranged, and therefore has a different third verse; furthermore the ending is extended and features one more repetition of the last line. The song's length of 3 minutes and 47 seconds is about the same as the regular version (that includes the intro by Minaj from the third verse at the beginning). This alternate version is referred to as "Letting Go (Dutty Love) (Promo Only Clean Edit)". It is not known if the version was leaked or distributed for promotional use by the record label.

== Composition ==
The song sounds similar to Rihanna's "Te Amo", which was also produced by the same production team, Stargate. The song has been described as an "island-tinged" jam that features synthesized dance floor beats and air horn effects. Minaj is featured in the song during the bridge and an additional verse reigning in her R-rated commentary on the "light-and-fluffy" track. "Letting Go (Dutty Love)" lyrically speaks of about new love, letting go of worries and just having fun. The melody and its backbeat feature the refrain "Dutty, dutty, dutty love love", which has been complimented. Kingston accentuates a Caribbean drawl atop steel drums and a heavy bassline.

== Critical reception ==
Rap-Up gave the song a positive review stating "Sound the alarm. Sean Kingston has just entered the race for the song of the summer." Erika Brooks Adickman of Idolator commented "All in all, we want to slap on some roller-skates and bop our heads to this song on our iPods. Can we place 'Letting Go (Dutty Love)' in the race as Song for the Summer?" On December 2, 2011, the song was certified platinum by the RIAA.

== Music video ==
A music video for the single was shot over the weekend of June 17, 2010, in Jamaica, directed by Lil X. Pictures of Kingston and Minaj on the set of the music video leaked onto the internet June 21, 2010, A sneak peek of the music video was released on Rap-Up on July 29 The music video premiered on Twitter on August 3, 2010. The video takes place in a dance-hall in Jamaica with a cast of dancers and fire-breathers, including American-Jamaican artist Shaggy. Throughout the video, Kingston and Minaj are seen singing into the camera while dancing on the dance-floor and singing their verses on a stage into an old fashioned microphone. The video ends with Minaj blowing a kiss into the camera.

== Live performances ==
Minaj has rapped her verse on select dates of her Pink Friday Tour. She also performed her part on her Pink Friday: Reloaded Tour.

== Weekly charts ==
Chart (2010)	Peak position
Australia (ARIA)	73
Canada (Canadian Hot 100)	35
Canada CHR/Top 40 (Billboard)	41
Italian Airplay Chart	96
New Zealand (Recorded Music NZ)	23
US Billboard Hot 100	36
US Dance Airplay (Billboard)	18
US Hot R&B/Hip-Hop Songs (Billboard)	51
US Latin Pop Airplay (Billboard)	24
US Pop Airplay (Billboard)	26
US Rhythmic Airplay (Billboard)	24

== Certifications ==
Region	Certification	Certified units/sales
New Zealand (RMNZ)	Platinum	30,000^{‡}
United States (RIAA)	Platinum	1,305,000
^{‡} Sales+streaming figures based on certification alone.

== Release history ==
Country	Date	Type
United States	June 28, 2010	Rhythmic airplay
United States	July 13, 2010	Mainstream
United States	August 3, 2010	Digital download
