= Sean Kingston (album) =

Studio album by Sean Kingston
- Released: July 31, 2007
- Recorded: 2007
- Genres: R&B; reggae fusion; pop
- Length: 51:50
- Labels: Beluga Heights; Epic; Koch
- Producers: J.R. Rotem, DJ Felli Fel

Sean Kingston chronology
Sean Kingston (2007)	Tomorrow (2009)

Singles from Sean Kingston
- 1. "Beautiful Girls" Released: May 26, 2007; 2. "Me Love" Released: July 31, 2007; 3. "Take You There" Released: September 14, 2007; 4. "There's Nothin" Released: March 13, 2008

Sean Kingston is the debut studio album by American singer Sean Kingston, released on July 31, 2007. The album was produced by J. R. Rotem. Sean Kingston, with help from Evan Bogart, wrote the songs which range from the self-deprecating-schoolboy tale of lost love in the album's most successful single "Beautiful Girls" to the much deeper "Dry Your Eyes", in which he visits the hardship of watching his mother and sister being sent to prison at the age of 15.

The album has been certified gold by the RIAA as of February 2008 with an excess of 500,000 copies.

The album entered the U.S. Billboard 200 chart at #6 and fell to #13 the following week. The album reached #2 on RIANZ in its second week.

== Background ==
Record executive E. Kidd Bogart talked about the making of the album in a 2024 interview: “A rapper named ‘Franchise’ wrote this chorus called "Beautiful Girls", it was actually called "Suicidal" at the time (...) and overnight they decided to change the entire Franchise rap album into a singing album, because this dude sang and they didn't realize he could sing. They changed Franchise name to Sean Kingston. (...) We went in and we started re-writing the entire Sean Kingston album”. In an interview with HitQuarters, producer J. R. Rotem described this process with regard to Kingston: “Sean Kingston was a rapper when we found him and it was a development process to get him more melodic. At Beluga we essentially refine the talent so that it's more of a marketable product.”

== Singles ==
Sean Kingston was firstly anticipated by the promotional single "Colors 2007".

The album's lead single, "Beautiful Girls", was released on May 26, 2007. It became a major hit internationally, topping the U.S. Billboard Hot 100, and several other charts, including Australia, Canada, New Zealand, Ireland, Spain and the United Kingdom. In the latter country, the song spent four weeks at the summit of the UK Singles Chart.

The second single "Me Love" was released on July 31, 2007, and entered in the top twenty of the U.S. Billboard Hot 100.

The third single "Take You There" was released on October 23, 2007. In the week of November 17, 2007, the single debuted on the Billboard Hot 100 at number 81, and later peaked at number 7.

"There's Nothin" was released as the album's final single on March 13, 2008.

== Critical reception ==
Professional ratings
Review scores
Source	Rating
Allmusic	3.5/5 stars
Entertainment Weekly	B
USA Today	3.5/4 stars
Yahoo! Music	6/10 stars
DJBooth.net	3/5 stars

AllMusic gave the album a slightly positive review, commenting that it “loads up on enough gimmicks, high-profile samples, hooks, and ridiculous lyrics that it's the textbook definition of love it or hate it and shouldn't be approached by anyone who considers themselves "hardcore."” Entertainment Weekly expressed a mixed opinion: “At its best, Kingston’s debut CD, Sean Kingston, keeps turning familiar riffs into dancehall cotton candy. (...) Unfortunately, a few unconvincingly tough hip-hop tracks seem like vestiges of a plot to present Kingston as a pudgy thug, before ”Girls” made him a star softie”. BBC Music argued that “JR Rotem’s production is clean and shiny, while Sean’s voice sounds a bit like Collie Buddz - although that may be because they’ve both been processed into oblivion.” The New York Times gave Sean Kingston a negative review “this is a surprisingly awkward album, with too many underbaked love songs and unmenacing threats”.

== Track listing ==
No.	Title	Writer(s)	Length
1.	"Intro"	Kisean Anderson, J.R. Rotem	0:34
2.	"Kingston"	Kisean Anderson, J.R. Rotem	3:28
3.	"Take You There"	Kisean Anderson, J.R. Rotem, E. Kidd Bogart, Timothy Thomas, Theron Thomas	3:57
4.	"Me Love"	Kisean Anderson, J.R. Rotem, John Bonham, John Paul Jones, Jimmy Page, Robert Plant	3:24
5.	"Beautiful Girls"	Kisean Anderson, J.R. Rotem, Sly "Pyper" Jordan, Ben E. King, Jerry Leiber, Mike Stoller	4:02
6.	"Dry Your Eyes"	Kisean Anderson, J.R. Rotem, Sly "Pyper" Jordan, E. Kidd Bogart	3:32
7.	"Got No Shorty"	Kisean Anderson, J.R. Rotem, Sly "Pyper" Jordan, Roger A. Graham and Spencer Williams	3:22
8.	"There's Nothin" (featuring Paula DeAnda)	Kisean Anderson, J.R. Rotem, E. Kidd Bogart	3:58
9.	"I Can Feel It"	Kisean Anderson, J.R. Rotem, Phil Collins	3:27
10.	"Drummer Boy"	Kisean Anderson, J.R. Rotem	3:37
11.	"Your Sister"	Kisean Anderson, J.R. Rotem, E. Kidd Bogart	3:30
12.	"That Ain't Right"	Kisean Anderson, J.R. Rotem	3:41
13.	"Change"	Kisean Anderson, J.R. Rotem	3:38

Alternate track
No.	Title	Length
8.	"There's Nothin'" (featuring Élan and Juelz Santana)	3:45

International bonus track
No.	Title	Writer(s)	Length
14.	"Colors (Reggae Remix)" (featuring Vybz Kartel and Kardinal Offishall)	Kisean Anderson, J.R. Rotem, Adidja Palmer, Tracy Morrow, Charles Glenn	4:35

iTunes deluxe version
No.	Title	Length
15.	"Personal (Big Girls Remix)" (featuring Fergie)	3:56
16.	"Beautiful Girls" (Music video)	4:17
17.	"Me Love" (Music video)	3:24
18.	"Take You There" (Music video)	4:01
19.	"There's Nothin" (featuring Élan and Juelz Santana) (Music video)	3:45

Sample credits

- "Me Love" - derived from the song, "D'yer Mak'er", written by Jimmy Page, Robert Plant, John Paul Jones and John Bonham; performed by Led Zeppelin.
- "Beautiful Girls" - contains portions of and features samples from the recording, "Stand by Me", written by Ben E. King, Jerry Leiber and Mike Stoller; performed by Ben E. King.
- "Got No Shorty" - contains interpolations of the composition, "I Ain't Got Nobody", written by Roger A. Graham and Spencer Williams; performed by Bing Crosby.
- "I Can Feel It" - features samples of the recording, "In the Air Tonight", written and performed by Phil Collins.
- "Colors" - contains an interpolation of the track, "Colors", written by Tracy Morrow and Charles Glenn; performed by Ice-T.
- "Take You There" - features a sample of a vocal melody from "Say It Right" by Nelly Furtado.

== Notes ==
The original version of "Colors" is found on The Game's 2007 mixtape You Know What It Is Vol. 4 - Murda Game Chronicles and features Kingston and Rick Ross.

== Charts and certifications ==
=== Weekly charts ===
Chart (2007–2008)	Peak position
Australian Albums (ARIA)	21
Dutch Albums (Album Top 100)	91
French Albums (SNEP)	43
Irish Albums (IRMA)	20
New Zealand Albums (RMNZ)	2
Scottish Albums (Official Charts)	20
Swiss Albums (Schweizer Hitparade)	74
Taiwanese Albums (Five Music)	9
UK Albums (Official Charts)	8
US Billboard 200	6
US Top R&B/Hip-Hop Albums (Billboard)	3

=== Year-end charts ===
Chart (2007)	Position
UK Albums (OCC)	184
US Billboard 200	179
US Top R&B/Hip-Hop Albums (Billboard)	89
Chart (2008)	Position
US Top R&B/Hip-Hop Albums (Billboard)	91

=== Certifications ===
Region	Certification	Certified units/sales
Australia (ARIA)	Gold	35,000^{^}
Canada (Music Canada)	Platinum	100,000^{^}
Ireland (IRMA)	Gold	7,500^{^}
New Zealand (RMNZ)	Gold	7,500^{^}
United Kingdom (BPI)	Gold	100,000^{^}
United States (RIAA)	Gold	500,000^{^}
^{^} Shipments figures based on certification alone.
