= Beat It (Sean Kingston song) =

Single by Sean Kingston featuring Chris Brown and Wiz Khalifa

from the album Back 2 Life
- Released: April 15, 2013
- Recorded: 2012
- Genre: R&B; hip hop; dirty rap
- Length: 4:14
- Label: Epic
- Songwriters: Kisean Anderson, Cameron Thomaz, Omari Akinlolu, Nicholas Balding, Josh Thomas, Mark Kragen
- Producer: Nic Nac

Sean Kingston singles chronology
"Rum and Raybans" (2012)	"Beat It" (2013)	"Wait Up" (2015)

Chris Brown singles chronology
"For the Road" (2013)	"Beat It" (2013)	"It Won't Stop" (2013)

Wiz Khalifa singles chronology
"NBA" (2013)	"Beat It" (2013)	"We Own It (Fast & Furious)" (2013)

Music video
- "Beat It" on YouTube

"Beat It" is a song by American singer Sean Kingston, featuring Chris Brown and Wiz Khalifa. It was released on April 15, 2013, as the second single from Kingston's album, Back 2 Life (2013). It was written by Kingston and Khalifa along with Omari Akinlolu and the song's producer, Nicholas "Nic Nac" Balding.

The song moderately entered Billboard Hot 100, peaking at number 52, and it peaked at number 17 on the Hot R&B/Hip-Hop Songs chart.

== Music video ==
A music video to accompany the release of "Beat It" was filmed on March 23, 2013, in Malibu. The video was released on YouTube and Vevo on April 29, 2013, at a total length of four minutes and sixteen seconds. The video features Kingston, Brown, and Khalifa partying poolside at an estate, and features a guest appearance by NicNac, the producer.

Main credits

- Directors/Producers - Colin Tilley, Luga Podesta, Josh Thomas, Jamar Hawkins and Brandon Bonfiglio
- Director of Photography - Rob Witt
- Editor - Vinnie Hobbs

Production

- Production Company - London Alley Entertainment
- Production Manager - Jenn Mickleson
- Production Coordinator - Dan Browne

Editorial

- Colorist - Marshall Plante
- Digital Imaging Technician (DIT) - Earl Fulcher

Costume and wardrobe

- Stylist - Gianni Arteaga

Cast

- Sean Kingston, Wiz Khalifa, Chris Brown, Colin Tilley, Josh Thomas, Nic Nac

== Track listing ==
No.	Title	Length
1.	"Beat It" (featuring Chris Brown and Wiz Khalifa)	4:14
2.	"Beat It" (Clean Version) (featuring Chris Brown and Wiz Khalifa)	4:14

== Credits and personnel ==
- Vocals - Kisean Anderson, Cameron Thomaz and Christopher Brown
- Production - Nick "Nic Nac" Balding, Josh Thomas and Kisean Anderson
- Songwriting - Kisean Anderson, Cameron Thomaz, Omari Akinlolu, Nicholas Balding, Josh Thomas and Mark Kragen
- Additional Engineering - Jared Scott

== Charts ==
=== Weekly charts ===
Chart (2013)	Peak position
Australia (ARIA)	40
Belgium (Ultratip Bubbling Under Flanders)	39
France (SNEP)	116
Ireland (IRMA)	63
New Zealand (Recorded Music NZ)	25
UK Hip Hop/R&B (OCC)	24
US Billboard Hot 100	52
US Pop Airplay (Billboard)	33
US Hot R&B/Hip-Hop Songs (Billboard)	17
US R&B/Hip-Hop Airplay (Billboard)	41
US Rhythmic Airplay (Billboard)	8

Chart (2025)	Peak position
Philippines Hot 100 (Billboard Philippines)	91

=== Year-end charts ===
Chart (2013)	position
US Hot R&B/Hip-Hop Songs (Billboard)	50
US Rhythmic (Billboard)	32

== Certifications ==
Region	Certification	Certified units/sales
Australia (ARIA)	Gold	35,000^{^}
New Zealand (RMNZ)	Platinum	30,000^{‡}
United Kingdom (BPI)	Silver	200,000^{‡}
^{^} Shipments figures based on certification alone.^{‡} Sales+streaming figures based on certification alone.

== Release history ==
Country	Release date	Format	Label
United States	April 15, 2013	Digital download	Epic Records
