= Face Drop =

Single by Sean Kingston

from the album Tomorrow
- Released: August 18, 2009; September 1, 2009 (Digital)
- Recorded: 2009
- Length: 3:05
- Label: Epic, Geffen, Koch
- Songwriter(s): Lucas Secon, Andrea Martin
- Producer(s): Lucas Secon

Sean Kingston singles chronology
"Fire Burning" (2009)	"Face Drop" (2009)	"Feel It" (2009)

Face Drop is the second single from Sean Kingston's second studio album Tomorrow, was released to radio stations on August 18, 2009, and released digitally on iTunes on September 1, 2009.

== Music video ==
The music video was co-starring by his animated character alter-ego Lil’ Sean whose visage appears on the cover of Tomorrow and plays an important part in Epic's interactive 3-D campaign, was directed by Ro Rao and released on September 3, 2009. The song has gone gold in the US, selling over 500.000 copies. It features Sean's girlfriend breaking up with him then lil' Sean appears. Everytime he walks by a pedestrian, they become animated. They appear at a pool party where his ex is then they start splashing her. After they splashed her, they left the party and Sean turns back to normal and finds another woman, as the video ends.

== Remix ==
The official remix features former Pretty Ricky member & singer Pleasure P was released and currently playing on urban radio stations in the US.

== Chart performance ==
"Face Drop" became Kingston's second #1 from the album Tomorrow in South Africa. It has also been certified Gold in New Zealand and was Top 30 on US radio and iTunes.

== Charts ==
Chart (2009)	Peak position
Canadian Hot 100	52
New Zealand Singles Chart	7
South African Singles Chart	1
UK Singles Chart	56
UK R&B Chart	21
US Billboard Hot 100	61
US Billboard Pop Songs	28

== Certifications ==
Region	Certification	Certified units/sales
New Zealand (RMNZ)	Gold	7,500^{*}
^{*} Sales figures based on certification alone.
