= Tomorrow (Sean Kingston album) =

Studio album by Sean Kingston
- Released: September 22, 2009
- Recorded: 2008–2009
- Genres: Reggae fusion; Europop
- Length: 44:58
- Labels: Beluga Heights; Epic
- Producers: J.R. Rotem; RedOne; Lucas Secon; Fernando Garibay; Wyclef Jean; Drum Up; the Messengers; the Smeezingtons; Jerry "Wonda" Duplessis

Sean Kingston chronology
Sean Kingston (2007)	Tomorrow (2009)	Back 2 Life (2013)

Singles from Tomorrow
- 1. "Fire Burning" Released: April 24, 2009; 2. "Face Drop" Released: August 18, 2009

Tomorrow is the second studio album by American singer Sean Kingston. The album was released on September 22, 2009. Led by the single "Fire Burning", the album peaked at number 37 on the U.S. Billboard 200 albums chart with 13,000 copies sold in the first week of release. The next week it fell to number 87.

== Background ==
The majority of the album was produced by J.R. Rotem, while also featuring productions from Detail, RedOne, Emanuel Kiriakou, DJ Frank E and others. Kingston worked with various songwriters on Tomorrow, including then-unknown American singer Bruno Mars, who co-wrote five tracks, Philip Lawrence, Diane Warren and Somali-Canadian rapper K'naan.

Two songs produced by J.R. Rotem, "Whatcha Say" and "Replay," were originally intended for Tomorrow, but Sean Kingston and his team rejected them. The tracks went on to become worldwide hits for Jason Derulo and singer Iyaz, respectively, with Derulo saying in a 2025 interview, "I'm sure somebody got fired."

== Composition ==
Tomorrow marks a detachment from the sound of Kingston's debut album, incorporating 1990s Eurodance and electropop, and instruments like Roland 808 drum machine, Auto-Tune and synthesizers, to his signature reggae and pop music style. "Shoulda Let Go", featuring American rock band Good Charlotte, melds together genres of punk rock and soft rock, while "Fire Burning", "Face Drop", and "My Girlfriend" showcase influences of nu-disco, Euro disco and electropop. The song "War" was originally supposed to feature hip-hop artist Lil Wayne, but he was not included on the official album version of the song.

Tomorrow's sound is significantly different from the sound of his debut, Sean Kingston. In this new LP, he explores sounds of 1990s eurodance and electropop, using instruments such as the Roland 808 drum machine, the Auto-Tune effect and synthesizers, while retaining his signature pop and reggae style.

== Critical reception ==
Professional ratings
Aggregate scores
Source	Rating
Metacritic	62/100
Review scores
Source	Rating
About.com	link
AllMusic	link
BBC	fairly positive link
Boston Globe	fairly positive link
Entertainment Weekly	C+
Now	link
Rolling Stone	link
USA Today	link

David Jeffries of AllMusic favored songs "Fire Burning", "Face Drop", "My Girlfriend", "Shoulda Let U Go", and "Ice Cream Girl" and feels ""Tomorrow" proves Kingston can provide a whole album's worth of pool-side entertainment even without the 'Beautiful Girls'-sized single." Jon Dolan of Rolling Stone said "For the most part--despite Auto-Tuned slow songs--Kingston's mix of young-adult desire and disco heat shows he can cross over in unexpected directions." Simon Vozick-Levinson of Entertainment Weekly felt that "Although he's got plenty of hooks, personality is in much shorter supply". While some of his reviews are positive, others feel his album lacks novelty and interest. Jason Richards of Now Magazine said that although he is a good singer-songwriter, his album lacks novelty and feels irritating. Apparently to Sarah Rodman of The Boston Globe, Kingston's collections of "silly lyrics and robotic tempos of Sean Kingston’s sophomore album slide if it were mid-July and we were in the mood for Euro-disco/reggae mash-ups, and straight-up electro-pop." Bill Lamb of About.com:

It's abundantly clear on Tomorrow that Sean Kingston plans to stick around for awhile. [sic] He demonstrates he can play well with other artists on the bouncy "Shoulda Let Go" which is co-produced by Drum Up (LaMar Seymour, LaNelle Seymour) for Drum Up Digital and featuring a rock chorus from Good Charlotte and a rhythmic vocal workout with Wyclef Jean on "Ice Cream Girl." At least half of the songs here could be pop hit singles and fit easily into contemporary pop radio playlists. Sean Kingston may want to consider stripping his sound down a bit more, but Tomorrow is far from an unpleasant listening experience. Sean Kingston has successfully delivered the goods he has to offer a second time around.

== Track listing ==
No.	Title	Writer(s)	Producer(s)	Length
1.	"Welcome to Tomorrow"	Jonathan Rotem; Keinan Abdi Warsame; Peter Gene Hernandez; Philip Lawrence	J.R. Rotem	0:57
2.	"War"	Rotem; Kisean Anderson	J.R. Rotem	2:59
3.	"Fire Burning"	Nadir Khayat; Bilal Hajji; Anderson	RedOne	4:03
4.	"My Girlfriend"	Hernandez; Fernando Garibay; Lawrence	Garibay	3:24
5.	"Face Drop"	Andrea Martin; Lucas Secon	Secon	3:04
6.	"Magical"	Rotem; Anderson	J.R. Rotem; Emanuel Kiriakou	3:09
7.	"Island Queen"	Hernandez; Lawrence	The Smeezingtons	3:42
8.	"Tomorrow"	Rotem; Warsame; Hernandez; Lawrence	J.R. Rotem	2:56
9.	"Twist Ya Around"	Rotem; Warsame; Hernandez; Lawrence; Alexander Grant; Anderson	J.R. Rotem; Alex da Kid	3:24
10.	"Wrap U Around Me"	Diane Warren	J.R. Rotem	3:22
11.	"Shoulda Let U Go" (featuring Good Charlotte and DJ Frank E)	Joel Madden; Benji Madden; Noel "Detail" Fisher; Justin Franks; Anderson; LaMar Seymour; LaNelle Seymour	DJ Frank E; Detail	3:08
12.	"Over"	Rotem; Anderson	J.R. Rotem	3:06
13.	"Ice Cream Girl" (featuring Wyclef Jean)	Wyclef Jean; Jerry "Wonda" Duplessis	Wyclef Jean; Jerry "Wonda" Duplessis	4:01
14.	"Why U Wanna Go"	Fisher; Kenya Luca	Detail; Greg Ogan	3:43

International digital bonus track
No.	Title	Length
15.	"Addicted"	3:40

Japan bonus tracks
No.	Title	Length
15.	"Fire Burning" (Dave Audé Club)	7:39
16.	"Face Drop" (Lucas DH Remix)	4:08

== Singles ==
- "Fire Burning" was the first official single from the album, released on April 24, 2009. It peaked at #5 on the Billboard Hot 100, becoming the most successful single from the album.
- "Face Drop" was the second official single from the album. It was released to radio stations on August 18, 2009 and iTunes on September 1, 2009. Lyrically, "Face Drop" is plea to not judge by appearance. It peaked at #61 on the Billboard Hot 100, which was of moderate success compared to Kingston's previous hits.

== Promotional singles ==
iTunes released promotional singles from the album as part of "Countdown to Tomorrow". All singles received the same animated artwork, each with a different color background.

- "My Girlfriend" was the first promo single and was released digitally on July 28, 2009.
- "Wrap U Around Me" was the second promo single and was released digitally on August 4, 2009.
- "Tomorrow" was the third promo single and was released digitally on August 11, 2009.
- "Island Queen" was the fourth promo single and was released digitally on August 18, 2009.
- "War" was the fifth promo single and was released digitally on August 25, 2009. Originally "War" featured rapper Lil Wayne, but this version was not included on the album.
- "Face Drop" was the sixth promo single and was released digitally on September 1, 2009. It was also released as the second official single from the album, and it was sent to radio on August 18, 2009.

== Charts ==
Chart performance for Tomorrow
Chart (2009)	Peak position
Australian Urban Albums (ARIA)	17
Canadian Albums (Billboard)	8
French Albums (SNEP)	146
Japanese Albums (Oricon)	29
UK Albums (Official Charts)	138
UK R&B Albums (Official Charts)	12
US Billboard 200	37

Chart (2026)	Peak position
US Reggae Albums (Billboard)	9

== Certifications ==
Certifications for Tomorrow
Region	Certification	Certified units/sales
New Zealand (RMNZ)	Gold	7,500^{‡}
^{‡} Sales+streaming figures based on certification alone.
