= Back 2 Life (Live It Up) =

Single by Sean Kingston featuring T.I.

from the album Back 2 Life
- Released: June 5, 2012
- Recorded: 2011–12
- Genre: Reggae fusion; R&B; hip hop
- Length: 3:24
- Label: Epic Records
- Songwriters: Kisean Anderson; Clifford Harris
- Producer: J. R. Rotem

Sean Kingston singles chronology
"Party All Night (Sleep All Day)" (2010)	"Back 2 Life (Live It Up)" (2012)	"Rum and Raybans" (2012)

T.I. singles chronology
"Love This Life" (2012)	"Back 2 Life (Live It Up)" (2012)	"2 Reasons" (2012)

"Back 2 Life (Live It Up)" is a reggae fusion, R&B and hip hop song by American recording artist Sean Kingston, featuring vocals from American rapper, record producer, actor, and entrepreneur T.I. The song was released on June 5, 2012 as the lead single from Kingston's third studio album, Back 2 Life.

== Music video ==
A music video to accompany the release of "Back 2 Life (Live It Up)" was first released onto YouTube on June 8, 2012 at a total length of three minutes and twenty-four seconds.

== Track listing ==
No.	Title	Length
1.	"Back 2 Life (Live It Up)" (feat. T.I.)	3:23

== Chart performance ==
=== Weekly charts ===
Chart (2012)	Peak position
Canada (Canadian Hot 100)	52
Germany (GfK)	70
US Bubbling Under Hot 100 Singles (Billboard)	9
US Pop Songs (Billboard)	39

== Release history ==
Country	Release date	Format	Label
United States	June 5, 2012	Digital download	Epic
United States	June 5, 2012	Mainstream airplay	Epic
