= Party All Night (Sleep All Day) =

2010 single by Sean Kingston

Single by Sean Kingston
- Released: December 21, 2010
- Genre: EDM
- Length: 3:42
- Label: Epic; Beluga Heights
- Songwriters: August Rigo; Duane Harden; Mikkel S. Eriksen, Tor Erik Hermansen; Sandy Wilhelm; Polina Goudieva
- Producers: Stargate; Sandy Vee

Sean Kingston singles chronology
"Dumb Love" (2010)	"Party All Night (Sleep All Day)" (2010)	"Back 2 Life (Live It Up)" (2012)

"Party All Night (Sleep All Day)" is a song by American-Jamaican recording artist Sean Kingston. The song was originally released as the fourth single from Kingston's third studio album, Back 2 Life, but was taken off for unknown reasons. It was released digitally on December 21, 2010 in the United States. The song peaked at number two on the Bubbling Under Hot 100 Singles chart. It was written by August Rigo, Duane Harden, Stargate, Sandy Vee, and Polina Goudieva, and it was produced by Stargate and Sandy Vee. The song's tune sampled "I Can't Dance" by David Hentschel, which appeared in the 1983 film Educating Rita.

The song was featured in the summer blockbusters The Inbetweeners Movie and Shark Night 3D, which caused the song to chart highly on the UK and Irish Singles Charts.

== Music video ==
A music video to accompany the release of the song was uploaded to YouTube on December 15, 2010 at a total length of three minutes and fifty-two seconds. It features Kingston waking up at 10:00pm on Thursday night as his alarm clock rang. He then received text messages from his friends asking him to go to the party and ended up heading there. The party lasted for only three days and the video ends with Kingston heading back to bed on Sunday morning before 10:00am.

== Track listing ==
Digital download
No.	Title	Length
1.	"Party All Night (Sleep All Day)"	3:42

== Charts ==
=== Weekly charts ===
Chart (2010–2011)	Peak position
Canada Hot 100 (Billboard)	55
Ireland (IRMA)	25
Scottish Singles Sales (Official Charts)	7
UK Hip Hop/R&B (Official Charts)	1
UK Singles (Official Charts)	9
US Bubbling Under Hot 100 (Billboard)	2

=== Year-end charts ===
Chart (2011)	Position
UK Albums (OCC)	120

== Certifications ==
Region	Certification	Certified units/sales
United Kingdom (BPI)	Gold	400,000^{‡}
^{‡} Sales+streaming figures based on certification alone.

== Release history ==
Region	Date	Type	Label
United States	December 21, 2010	Digital download	Sony Music Entertainment
United States	February 1, 2011	Mainstream airplay	Sony Music Entertainment
United Kingdom	October 10, 2011	Digital download	Sony Music Entertainment
