= Sean Kingston =

American-Jamaican singer (born 1990)

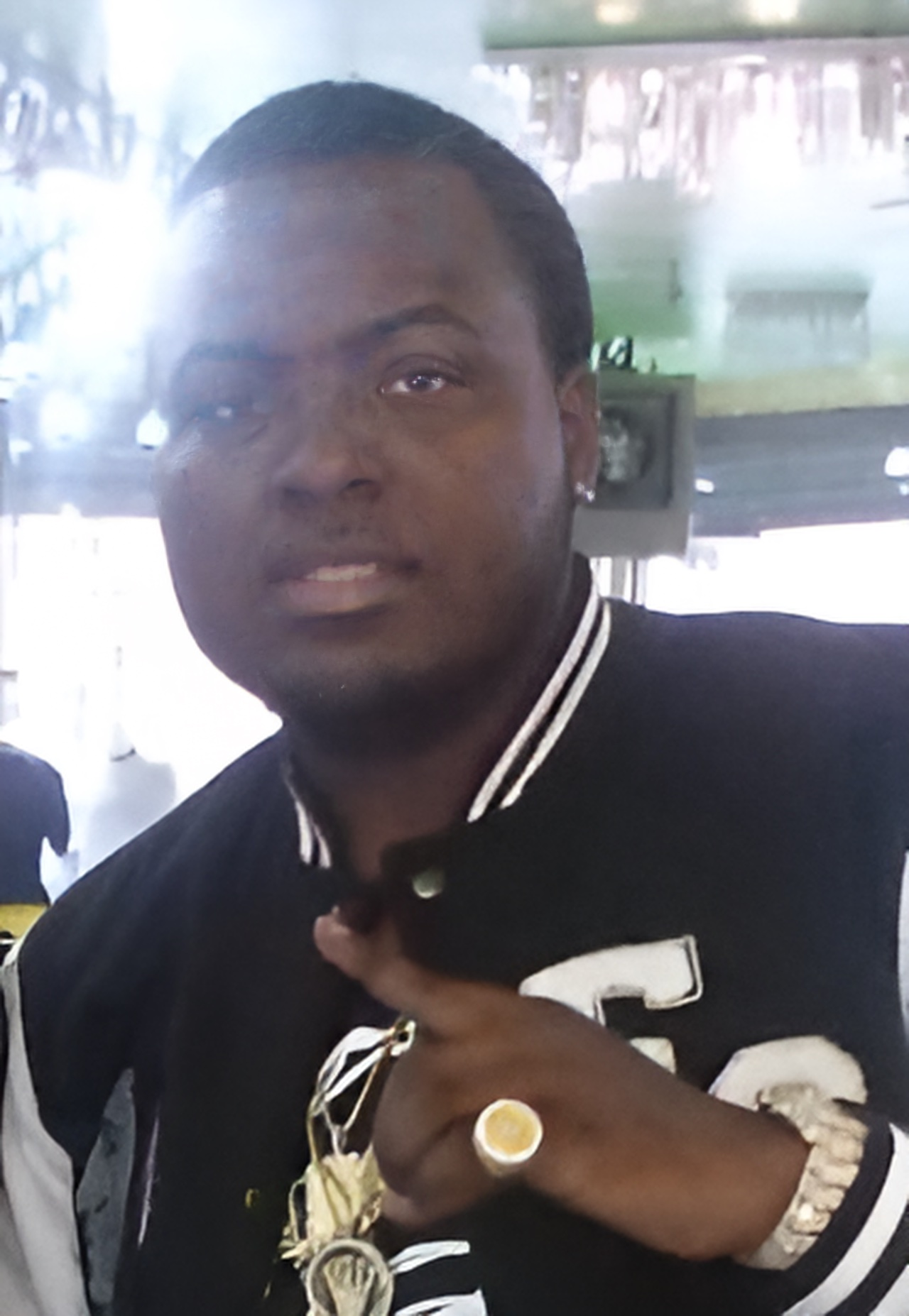
- Kingston in 2013

Background information
- Born: Kisean Paul Anderson; February 3, 1990 (age 36); Miami, Florida, U.S.
- Genres: Pop; reggae fusion; R&B; hip-hop
- Occupations: Rapper; singer; songwriter
- Instrument: Vocals
- Works: Discography
- Years active: 2007–2025
- Labels: Empire; E1; Time Is Money; Epic; Beluga Heights
- Website: seankingstonmusic.com
- Criminal information
- Status: Incarcerated
- Criminal charge: Wire fraud
- Capture status: August 15, 2025

Details
- Imprisoned at: FMC Lexington

Kisean Paul Anderson (born February 3, 1990), known professionally as Sean Kingston, is an American singer. Born in Miami, he signed with J. R. Rotem's record label Beluga Heights Records, in a joint venture with Koch and Epic Records in 2007. The label released his 2007 debut single "Beautiful Girls", which peaked atop the Billboard Hot 100 and served as lead single for his debut album Sean Kingston (2007). It peaked at number 6 on the Billboard 200 and spawned the top 40-single "Take You There", while his second album, Tomorrow (2009), saw a commercial decline, but spawned the top five-single "Fire Burning". His third album, Back 2 Life (2013), failed to chart and served as his final release on a major label, but spawned the moderate hit "Beat It" (featuring Chris Brown and Wiz Khalifa).

After his second album, Kingston launched the record label Time Is Money Entertainment, through which he signed then-unknown Canadian singer Tory Lanez in 2010.

In July 2024, Kingston and his mother were indicted on several federal wire fraud charges. They were convicted in March 2025. His mother was sentenced to five years in prison on July 23, 2025. Kingston was sentenced to three and a half years in prison on August 15, 2025.

== Early life ==
Anderson was born in Miami, the first of three children of Janice Turner. Anderson's family moved to their native Kingston, Jamaica, when he was six. Anderson attended Ocho Rios High School in Ocho Rios for three years before immigrating back to the United States. His grandfather was the noted Jamaican reggae producer Lawrence "Jack Ruby" Lindo.

== Career ==
=== 2007–2009: Sean Kingston ===
Kingston was discovered on YouTube by Matt Tobin at Beluga Heights Records, and signed to the label in a partnership deal with Sony. In an interview with HitQuarters, label head and producer J. R. Rotem described this process with regard to Kingston:

"Sean Kingston was a rapper when we found him and it was a development process to get him more melodic. At Beluga we essentially refine the talent so that it's more of a marketable product."

In a venture between Epic Records and Koch Records, Kingston recorded and released the single "Beautiful Girls" in May 2007. "Beautiful Girls" was a major hit internationally, topping the U.S. Billboard Hot 100, and several other charts, including Australia, Canada, New Zealand, Ireland, Spain and the United Kingdom. In the latter country, the song spent four weeks at the summit of the UK Singles Chart. His self-titled debut album was released on July 31, 2007, and has been certified gold by the RIAA for its 500,000 copies sold, while peaking at number 6 on the Billboard 200.

In 2007, Kingston was the opening act for Gwen Stefani's The Sweet Escape Tour and for select dates on Beyoncé's The Beyoncé Experience tour. In 2008, he was one of the opening acts for the Australian leg of Kelly Clarkson's My December Tour.

=== 2009–2011: Tomorrow ===
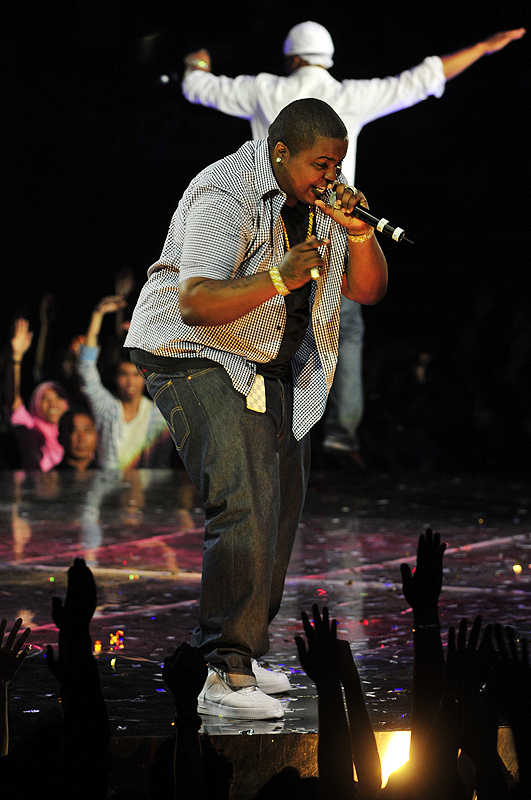
Kingston performing in 2009

Kingston's second album Tomorrow was released on September 22, 2009. Producers involved on the album include Wyclef Jean, RedOne, and Kingston's original mentor, J. R. Rotem. "Fire Burning" and "Face Drop" were released as singles. Additionally, five promotional digital singles were released leading up to the album. In the meantime, Kingston co-wrote labelmate Jason Derulo's debut single "Whatcha Say", which topped the Billboard Hot 100. He also discovered R&B-reggae singer Iyaz on MySpace, and led him to sign with Beluga Heights. He also recorded the track "Miss Everything" for the UK girl-group Sugababes studio album Sweet 7 which was released March 15, 2010, in the UK. Kingston guest appeared on Bow Wow's single "For My Hood", from the film Lottery Ticket, released that August. He had a performance in the O2 Arena where he was supported by Mumzy Stranger.

=== 2011–2013: King of Kingz, Back 2 Life, "Lee Strike" and other projects ===
His third studio album was announced to feature T-Pain, Nicki Minaj, Kanye West, Flo Rida, Soulja Boy, Wyclef Jean, Cher Lloyd, Akon and Green Eyed Tayla, with its lead single being "Eenie Meenie" with Justin Bieber, released on March 23, 2010, which is also included on Bieber's My World 2.0 album. The second single from the album was supposed to be "Letting Go (Dutty Love)", which features a verse from Nicki Minaj. It was released on iTunes August 3, while the third, "Dumb Love", co-written by Bruno Mars, was released on September 8. A fourth single "Party All Night (Sleep All Day)" was released on December 21, 2010. However, none of the four singles were included on any album by Kingston.

Kingston represented the continents of North and South America to sing the Official Theme Song of the Singapore 2010 Youth Olympic Games, "Everyone." He collaborated with four other artists representing their continent, South African Jody Williams representing Africa, Singaporean Tabitha Nauser (Asia), Briton Steve Appleton (Europe), and Australian Jessica Mauboy representing Oceania. However, Kingston was unable to attend the Singapore Youth Olympics 2010 opening ceremony due to passport mix-ups.

Kingston planned to release a mixtape with pop singer Justin Bieber, titled Our World. It featured about 12–14 songs and included their versions of the then-popular songs "Pretty Boy Swag", Eagles' hit single "Lyin' Eyes", and "Billionaire". The mixtape was completed and Kingston showed his fans a preview on uStream on August 19, 2010. However, the album was never released. Kingston also went on to perform on the first leg of Bieber's tour. Kingston released his first mixtape, King of Kingz, as a free download only, on February 3, 2011. The mixtape includes guest appearances by Akon, Flo Rida, Soulja Boy, Justin Bieber, B.o.B, and Tory Lanez. Kingston announced that his new album would be called Back 2 Life. He also said in an interview with MTV that he would be completely re-doing the album and that the previous singles would not be on it. Kingston linked up with T.I. on the set of the video for "Back 2 Life", the street single off his then-upcoming album of the same name. The two shot the video in Los Angeles with comedian Mike Epps. In November 2012, Kingston performed in the Dubai Caribbean Carnival at Downtown Dubai with Jason Derulo and Bow Wow. On April 13, 2013, iTunes put up the preorder of Back 2 Life, its cover art and track listing as well as a release date of September 10, 2013. The album failed to chart on the U.S. Billboard 200, but spawned the hit single "Beat It", featuring Chris Brown and Wiz Khalifa.

=== 2013–2023: Road to Deliverance ===
In March 2013, Kingston announced plans for his upcoming fourth studio album while stating that he would be recording with Disney and pop star Zendaya. At the same time, he said that they were both recording a song titled "Heart on Empty", which Kingston described as "a soulful ballad that you all will be sure to remember". In November, Kingston also guest starred as Dexter and Saint in an episode of Black Dynamite on Cartoon Network's Adult Swim. In March 2015, Kingston posted on Instagram a picture with Swedish record producer RedOne, confirming that they were working on the album. In May 2015, Kingston posted a snippet of the then-upcoming lead single from his fourth studio album. On September 14, 2015, Kingston premiered his first single in two years, titled "Wait Up", the lead single off his upcoming fourth studio album. However the song ended up not included on any album. In December 2015, he released "sina see song" with Sri Lankan music producer Iraj Weeraratne, Indian singer Sonu Kakkar, and Kaizer Kaiz (Sri Lankan rapper). Music videos were released for "One Away" and "All I Got" in January and March 2016, respectively. In March 2017, he announced the release of the Made in Jamaica mixtape, preceded by the single "Chance" that featured Vybz Kartel. However the mixtape was scrapped. In 2018, he participated with Italian singer Giusy Ferreri on the vocal part of the single "Amore e capoeira", by Italian record producers Takagi & Ketra. In 2019, he released his single "Peace of Mind" with Canadian singer Tory Lanez and Nigerian singer Davido. In June 2020, he announced the creation of the "Professional Rapper Boxing League" with hip hop super-agent, Triple the Mogul. On May 21, 2021, Kingston returned with the single, "Darkest Times" (featuring G Herbo), while also announcing his upcoming fourth studio album. On December 31, 2021, Kingston participated with Japanese rapper Tomoro on the single "Let Me Hold You".

On August 20, 2022, while on his Road 2 Deliverance Tour, Kingston performed a rare college welcome concert at the request of the University of Virginia's University Program Council to promote his new album Road to Deliverance and excite incoming students. Despite arriving after a two-hour delay, the concert was deemed a success amongst students.

On September 30, 2022, Road to Deliverance was released as Kingston's fourth studio album. In 2023, Kingston co-wrote Chris Brown's single "Sensational".

== Personal life ==
In May 2011, Kingston was involved in a near-fatal jet skiing accident in Miami and was immediately rushed to the hospital. Kingston was required to pay a $180 fine for careless operation in the accident. By 2018, he had begun to ride jet skis again.

=== Activism ===
Kingston filmed a public service announcement with Do Something to encourage teens to become active in their communities by forming a Do Something club. In 2010, he appeared with one of his dogs in an ad for PETA, encouraging people not to chain their dogs outside.

== Legal issues ==
=== May 2024 fraud and theft charges ===
On May 23, 2024, Kingston's rented Southwest Ranches, Florida, mansion was raided by a police SWAT team and his mother was arrested. The federal arrest warrant was issued on several instances of alleged fraud and theft. Kingston was arrested a few hours later in California after a concert in Fort Irwin, and he was booked into jail in San Bernardino County. Kingston waived his right to fight extradition and was sent to Broward County jail in Florida. A week later, Kingston was released from police custody after posting bail of $100,000.

=== July 2024 wire fraud charges ===
On July 19, 2024, a federal grand jury indicted Kingston and his mother on one count each of conspiracy to commit wire fraud and five counts each of wire fraud. The charges stem from their alleged involvement in a scheme to defraud sellers of high-end specialty vehicles, jewelry, and other goods purchased through fraudulent documents and wire transfers. It was reported that Kingston and his mother had $1 million worth of items they obtained fraudulently and did not pay for. For each count, Kingston and his mother faced up to 20 years in prison.

The charges follow a February lawsuit filed against Kingston by Ver Ver Entertainment, which claims Kingston did not pay for items such as luxury watches that he purchased. The lawsuit also alleges that Kingston claimed to have a "current and ongoing working relationship" with Justin Bieber and would be able to get Bieber to work on promotional videos on behalf of the company, even though the two had not made a song together since releasing "Eenie Meenie" in 2010.

On March 28, 2025, a jury convicted them on all charges. The judge put Kingston on house arrest with electronic monitoring. He is required to post a surety bond consisting of his $500,000 home plus $200,000 in cash. Turner was remanded to federal custody. Sentencing was originally set for July 11, 2025, but it was later moved to August 15 to allow Kingston more time to find an attorney. He was held at the Federal Detention Center, Miami after being unable to complete the bond.

His mother, Janice Turner, was sentenced to five years in prison on July 23, 2025. Kingston was sentenced to three and a half years in prison on August 15, 2025, followed by three years of supervised release.

== Discography ==
Studio albums

- Sean Kingston (2007)
- Tomorrow (2009)
- Back 2 Life (2013)
- Road to Deliverance (2021)

== Awards and nominations ==
Year	Award	Category	Nominated work	Result
2007	MOBO Awards	Best Reggae Ever Acts	Himself	Won
2007	Teen Choice Awards	Choice R&B Track	"Beautiful Girls"	Won
2007	Teen Choice Awards	Choice Summer Track	"Beautiful Girls"	Nominated
2008	Image Awards	Outstanding New Artist	Himself	Nominated
2009	Teen Choice Awards	Choice Summer Song	"Fire Burning"	Nominated
2013	MTV Video Music Awards Japan	Best Reggae Video	"Back 2 Life (Live It Up)" (feat. T.I.)	Nominated
