= Beautiful Girls (Sean Kingston song) =

2007 single by Sean Kingston

Single by Sean Kingston

from the album Sean Kingston
- Released: May 26, 2007
- Recorded: 2007
- Genre: Pop; doo-wop; R&B; reggae
- Length: 4:02 (album version); 3:43 (radio edit)
- Label: Epic
- Songwriters: Kisean Anderson; Jonathan Rotem; Jerome Leiber; Michael Stoller; Ben E. King; Peter Harrison
- Producers: J. R. Rotem; Peter Harrison

Sean Kingston singles chronology
"Beautiful Girls" (2007)	"Me Love" (2007)

Music video
- "Beautiful Girls" on YouTube

"Beautiful Girls" is the debut single by the Jamaican-American singer and rapper Sean Kingston from his 2007 debut album Sean Kingston. The song, which samples the 1961 song "Stand by Me" by Ben E. King, is about a boy who feels "suicidal" after being rejected by a "beautiful girl".

Commercially, the song reached number one in Australia, Canada, Ireland, New Zealand, the United Kingdom, and the United States, as well as the top ten in fourteen additional countries. Rapper Lil Mama and actors Kenny Vibert and Lil' JJ are featured in the music video directed by Marcus Raboy, which has 1.5 billion views on YouTube as of May 4, 2026.

== Lyrics controversy ==
Due to the lyrics containing references to suicide, the song was re-recorded for Radio Disney, with every instance of the word "suicidal" replaced with "in denial". Complaints about the suicide references also caused the song to be banned from FM104 in Dublin.

== Track listing ==
UK CD single

1. "Beautiful Girls" (album version) – 4:02
2. "Beautiful Girls" (a cappella) – 3:41
3. "Beautiful Girls" (instrumental) – 3:40
4. "Beautiful Girls" (remix) (featuring Fabolous and Lil' Boosie) – 3:27
5. "Beautiful Girls" (video)

== Chart performance ==
The week after the song's digital release it hit number one on Billboard's Hot Digital Songs, debuting with 260,000 downloads in its first week (the second highest digital sales for a new song of 2007, only behind Rihanna's "Umbrella"). Kingston became the first artist born in the 1990s to top the Hot 100. It has also occupied the top spot on the US Hot 100 Airplay and the Canadian Hot 100. It remained on top of the UK Singles Chart for four weeks. The song ended 2007 as the year's 15th biggest-selling single in the UK. On the ARIA charts in Australia, it debuted at number one.

== Charts ==
=== Weekly charts ===
Chart (2007–2008)	Peak position
Australia (ARIA)	1
Australian Urban (ARIA)	1
Austria (Ö3 Austria Top 40)	4
Belgium (Ultratop 50 Flanders)	10
Belgium (Ultratop 50 Wallonia)	7
Brazil (Crowley Broadcast Analysis)	2
Canada Hot 100 (Billboard)	1
CIS Airplay (TopHit)	71
Czech Republic Airplay (ČNS IFPI)	9
Denmark (Tracklisten)	2
Europe (Eurochart Hot 100)	1
Finland (Suomen virallinen lista)	19
France (SNEP)	2
Germany (GfK)	10
Hungary (Dance Top 40)	6
Hungary (Rádiós Top 40)	1
Hungary (Single Top 40)	7
Ireland (IRMA)	1
Italy (FIMI)	7
Netherlands (Dutch Top 40)	8
Netherlands (Single Top 100)	11
New Zealand (Recorded Music NZ)	1
Norway (VG-lista)	6
Romania (Romanian Top 100)	7
Scottish Singles Sales (Official Charts)	1
Slovakia Airplay (ČNS IFPI)	14
Sweden (Sverigetopplistan)	3
Switzerland (Schweizer Hitparade)	11
UK Singles (Official Charts)	1
UK Hip Hop/R&B (Official Charts)	1
US Billboard Hot 100	1
US Hot R&B/Hip-Hop Songs (Billboard)	12
US Pop Airplay (Billboard)	2
US Rhythmic Airplay (Billboard)	1

=== Year-end charts ===
Chart (2007)	Position
Australia (ARIA)	10
Austria (Ö3 Austria Top 40)	48
Belgium (Ultratop Flanders)	69
Belgium (Ultratop Wallonia)	79
Brazil (Crowley)	12
Europe (Eurochart Hot 100)	8
France (SNEP)	26
Germany (Official German CHarts)	64
Hungary (Dance Top 40)	42
Hungary (Rádiós Top 40)	18
Netherlands (Dutch Top 40)	72
Netherlands (Single Top 100)	94
New Zealand (Recorded Music NZ)	10
Sweden (Sverigetopplistan)	46
Switzerland (Schweizer Hitparade)	65
UK Singles (Official Charts Company)	15
UK Urban (Music Week)	14
US Billboard Hot 100	31
US Hot R&B/Hip-Hop Songs (Billboard)	81
US Rhythmic (Billboard)	13

Chart (2008)	Position
Spain (PROMUSICAE)	35

== Certifications ==
Region	Certification	Certified units/sales
Australia (ARIA)	Platinum	70,000^{^}
Brazil (Pro-Música Brasil)	Gold	30,000^{*}
Canada (Music Canada)	2× Platinum	80,000^{*}
Denmark (IFPI Danmark)	Platinum	15,000^{^}
Germany (BVMI)	Platinum	300,000^{‡}
New Zealand (RMNZ)	6× Platinum	180,000^{‡}
Spain (Promusicae)	Gold	10,000^{*}
United Kingdom (BPI)	3× Platinum	1,800,000^{‡}
United States (RIAA) Digital	Platinum	1,000,000^{*}
Ringtone
Canada (Music Canada)	3× Platinum	120,000^{*}
Spain (Promusicae)	Platinum	20,000^{*}
United States (RIAA)	2× Platinum	2,000,000^{*}
^{*} Sales figures based on certification alone.^{^} Shipments figures based on certification alone.^{‡} Sales+streaming figures based on certification alone.

== JoJo version ==
"Beautiful Girls Reply"

Promotional single by JoJo
- Released: July 20, 2007
- Length: 3:32
- Label: Da Family; Blackground
- Songwriter: Joanna "JoJo" Levesque
- Producer: J.R. Rotem

"Beautiful Girls" (also known as "Beautiful Girls Reply") is a song by American singer JoJo. It was released digitally on July 20, 2007, as a cover response to "Beautiful Girls" by Sean Kingston. The song samples Ben E. King's "Stand by Me". Whereas Kingston's version is about a boy who is suicidal over the failure of his relationship with a "beautiful girl", JoJo speaks from a girl's perspective.

=== Chart performance ===
The song debuted at number 39 on the Billboard Rhythmic Top 40 chart one month after its release.

Chart (2007)	Peak position
US Rhythmic Top 40 (Billboard)	39

== See also ==
- List of Hot 100 number-one singles of 2007 (U.S.)
- List of Hot 100 number-one singles of 2007 (Canada)
- List of number-one singles of 2007 (Ireland)
- List of number-one singles in Australia in 2007
- List of number-one singles from the 2000s (New Zealand)
- List of number-one singles from the 2000s (UK)
- List of European number-one hits of 2007
