= Back 2 Life =

2013 album by Sean Kingston

Studio album by Sean Kingston
- Released: September 10, 2013
- Genres: Dance-pop; reggae fusion; R&B
- Length: 37:28
- Labels: Beluga Heights; Epic
- Producers: J.R. Rotem; Nic Nac; RedOne; Paul A.

Sean Kingston chronology
Tomorrow (2009)	Back 2 Life (2013)	Road To Deliverance (2022)

Singles from Back 2 Life
- 1. "Back 2 Life (Live It Up)" Released: June 5, 2012; 2. "Beat It" Released: April 15, 2013

Back 2 Life is the third studio album by American singer Sean Kingston. It was released on September 10, 2013, by Beluga Heights Records and Epic Records. It was supported by the single "Beat It", which peaked at number 52 on the Billboard Hot 100. Notwithstanding, Back 2 Life failed to enter the Billboard 200 and saw mixed reviews, becoming his final album on a major label.

The album features guest appearances from T.I., Chris Brown, Wiz Khalifa, Wale, Yo Gotti, Busta Rhymes and 2 Chainz.

== Singles ==
On July 23, 2010, the first promotional single, produced by Paul A., "Letting Go (Dutty Love)" featuring Nicki Minaj, was released. On August 3, the music video was released. On September 7, the second promotional single "Dumb Love" was released. On December 21, the third promotional single "Party All Night (Sleep All Day)" was released, followed by its music video on December 23. On June 5, 2012, the album's lead single "Back 2 Life (Live It Up)" featuring T.I. and produced by Paul A. was released. A music video followed on June 8, 2012. On November 16, the fourth promotional single "Rum and Raybans" featuring Cher Lloyd was released, with its music video released on November 18. On April 15, 2013, the second single "Beat It" featuring Chris Brown and Wiz Khalifa was released. On April 29, 2013, the music video was released. On September 10, 2013, the music video was released for "Seasonal Love" featuring Wale.

== Critical response ==
Professional ratings
Review scores
Source	Rating
AllMusic	4/5 stars
PopMatters	4/10

Back 2 Life was met with generally mixed reviews from music critics. David Jeffries of AllMusic gave the album four out of five stars, saying "Previewed by the Soul II Soul-sampling single 'Back 2 Life (Live It Up)' featuring T.I., plus the cool and slow 'Beat It' with special guests Chris Brown and Wiz Khalifa, Sean Kingston's third album is a slick, wide-reaching affair with production coming from the likes of J.R. Rotem, Nic Nac, and RedOne. Besides the names above, the guest list reads like an all-star roster with 2 Chainz, Wale, Busta Rhymes, and Yo Gotti all lending a hand, but it's the mature Kingston who is in control and going it alone on the more sweet and sincere highlights." Brent Faulkner of PopMatters gave the album a four out of ten, saying Ultimately, Back 2 Life relies too heavily on sex and partying for its inspiration. Sure, Kingston's celebration is completely understandable, but the lack of substance beyond drinks, smoking, and hooking up truly hurts this album. Even if rationalized as a 'guilty pleasure' upon an initial listen, the 'pleasure' part of the description is most definitely arguable."

== Track listing ==
Back 2 Life track listing
No.	Title	Producer(s)	Length
1.	"Back 2 Life (Live It Up)" (featuring T.I.)	Paul A.	3:23
2.	"Beat It" (featuring Chris Brown and Wiz Khalifa)	Nic Nac	4:13
3.	"Hold That" (featuring Yo Gotti)	Nic Nac	2:42
4.	"Bomba"	J.R. Rotem	3:39
5.	"Smoke Signals"	RedOne	3:12
6.	"Ordinary Girl"	J.R. Rotem	3:26
7.	"Seasonal Love" (featuring Wale)	Nic Nac	4:26
8.	"How We Survive" (featuring Busta Rhymes)	J.R. Rotem	3:28
9.	"Shotta Luv" (featuring 2 Chainz)	Nic Nac	2:55
10.	"Ayo (16th Floor)"	Nic Nac	3:39
11.	"Save One For Me"	Nic Nac	2:25

Back 2 Life – iTunes Store bonus track
No.	Title	Writer(s)	Producer(s)	Length
12.	"Love Ecstasy"	Kenneth "Mrbillboard" Joseph	Phatboiz	3:48

Back 2 Life – Japanese bonus track
No.	Title	Producer(s)	Length
12.	"Party All Night (Sleep All Day)"	Stargate, Sandy Vee	3:42

== Charts ==
Chart (2013)	Peak position
US Top R&B/Hip-Hop Albums (Billboard)	33
