= Strength of a Woman Tour =

2017 concert tour by Mary J. Blige

- Tour by Mary J. Blige
- Promotional poster for the tour
- Associated album: Strength of a Woman
- Start date: April 2, 2017
- End date: September 9, 2017
- Legs: 1
- No. of shows: 25 in North America; 9 in Europe; 34 in total

Mary J. Blige concert chronology
- King and Queen of Hearts World Tour (2016); Strength of a Woman World Tour (2017); The Royalty Tour (2019)

Strength of a Woman Tour was the tenth concert tour by American R&B recording artist Mary J. Blige, in support of her thirteenth studio album, Strength of a Woman (2017). The tour began on April 2, 2017 in London and ended in Oakland on September 9, 2017. According to Pollstar's 2017 Year End top 200 North American Tours, the tour grossed over $9 million in North America alone and over $15 million worldwide.

== Critical reception ==
Karu F. Daniels from NBC News stated that Blige "...is blowing away audiences with a raw and rapturous concert performance that is undeniable."

== Opening acts ==
- Lalah Hathaway
- LeToya Luckett (select venues)
- Joe (select venues)
- Stokley Williams (select venues)

== Setlist ==
Oceania and Europe
1. "The One"
2. "Enough Cryin"
3. "I Can Love You"
4. "You Bring Me Joy"
5. "Reminisce" / "Real Love" / "You Remind Me"
6. "Be Happy"
7. "Love No Limit" (contains elements of "Mary Jane (All Night Long)")
8. "Strength of A Woman"
9. "Don't Mind" (contains elements of "What's the 411?" and "Sweet Thing")
10. "Share My World" / "Everything"
11. "My Life"
12. "I'm Goin' Down"
13. "Set Me Free"
14. "Love Don't Live Here Anymore"
15. "U + Me (Love Lesson)"
16. "Thick of It"
17. "Not Gon' Cry"
18. "No More Drama"
19. "Love Yourself"

Encore

20. "Family Affair"
North America
1. "Be Happy"
2. "The One"
3. "Enough Cryin"
4. "Just Fine"
5. "Love Yourself"
6. "I Can Love You"
7. "Reminisce"
8. "Real Love"
9. "Love No Limit" / "You Bring Me Joy" / "You Remind Me"
10. "Don't Mind"
11. "Share My World" / "Everything"
12. "My Life"
13. "I'm Goin' Down"
14. "Set Me Free"
15. "Strength Of a Woman"
16. "Love Don't Live Here Anymore"
17. "U + Me (Love Lesson)"
18. "Glow Up"
19. "Thick Of It"
20. "Not Gon Cry"
21. "No More Drama"

Encore

22. "Family Affair"

== Tour dates ==
List of concerts, showing date, city, country and venue
Date (2017)	City	Country	Venue
July 1	New Orleans	U.S.	2017 Essence Festival
July 3	Atlantic City	U.S.	Borgata Event Center
July 4	Philadelphia	U.S.	Wawa Welcome America Festival 2017
July 8	Rotterdam	Netherlands	North Sea Jazz Festival
July 9	Zurich	Switzerland	Live At Sunset 2017
July 10	Vienne	France	Jazz à Vienne
July 12	Lucca	Italy	Lucca Summer Festival 2017
July 14	Paris	France	Olympia
July 15	Birmingham	England	O2 Academy Birmingham
July 16	London	England	Kew the Music
July 19	Nice	France	Nice Jazz Festival
July 22	Gothenburg	Sweden	Stora Scenen
July 28	Cincinnati	U.S.	Cincinnati Music Festival
July 30	Chicago	U.S.	Chicago Theatre
August 1	Sterling Heights	U.S.	Michigan Lottery Amphitheatre at Freedom Hill
August 2	Northfield	U.S.	Hard Rock Live Cleveland
August 4	Buffalo	U.S.	Shea's Performing Arts Center
August 5	Indianapolis	U.S.	Murat Theater
August 6	Nashville	U.S.	Nashville Municipal Auditorium
August 8	College Park	U.S.	Wolf Creek Amphitheater
August 10	Raleigh	U.S.	Red Hat Amphitheater
August 13	Baltimore	U.S.	MECU Pavilion
August 18	Brooklyn	U.S.	Ford Amphitheater at Coney Island
August 19	New York City	U.S.	The Theater at Madison Square Garden
August 22	Miami Beach	U.S.	Fillmore Miami Beach
August 23	Jacksonville	U.S.	Daily's Place
August 25	Sugar Land	U.S.	Smart Financial Centre
August 26	Dallas	U.S.	Music Hall at Fair Park
August 30	Phoenix	U.S.	Comerica Theatre
September 1	Las Vegas	U.S.	Pearl Concert Theatre
September 2	Los Angeles	U.S.	Greek Theatre
September 6	Denver	U.S.	Bellco Theater
September 8	Reno	U.S.	Grand Theatre at the Grand Sierra Resort
September 9	Oakland	U.S.	Paramount Theatre
