= 49th NAACP Image Awards =

American entertainment awards for 2017 works

- Date: January 15, 2018
- Site: Pasadena Civic Auditorium, Pasadena, California
- Hosted by: Anthony Anderson
- Official website: NAACPImageAwards.net

Television coverage
- Network: TV One

The 49th NAACP Image Awards ceremony, presented by the National Association for the Advancement of Colored People (NAACP), honored outstanding representations and achievements of people of color in motion pictures, television, music, and literature during the 2017 calendar year. The ceremony took place on January 15, 2018, at the Pasadena Civic Auditorium, was hosted by Anthony Anderson and broadcast on TV One.

During the ceremony American actor and film director Danny Glover was honored with the President's Award for being «a true inspiration who always uses his celebrity status to advance the cause of social justice and respect for our diverse society. [...] Glover has is known for wide-reaching community activism and philanthropic efforts with a particular emphasis on advocacy for economic justice, access to health care and education programs in the United States and Africa». William Lucy was honored with the «in recognition of his role in the labour movement and his accomplishments as a labor organizer and justice advocate. His work with Martin Luther King Jr. during the 1968 Memphis Sanitation Strike and the instrumental role he played in the Anti-Apartheid Movement».

The award show also honored with the Vanguard Award the surviving of 1968 Memphis Sanitation Strike "I Am a Man" workers for supporting the African-American community and the workers' struggle in the Southern United States to recognise equal pay and rights for the labour force.

All nominees are listed below, and the winners are listed in bold.

== Special awards ==
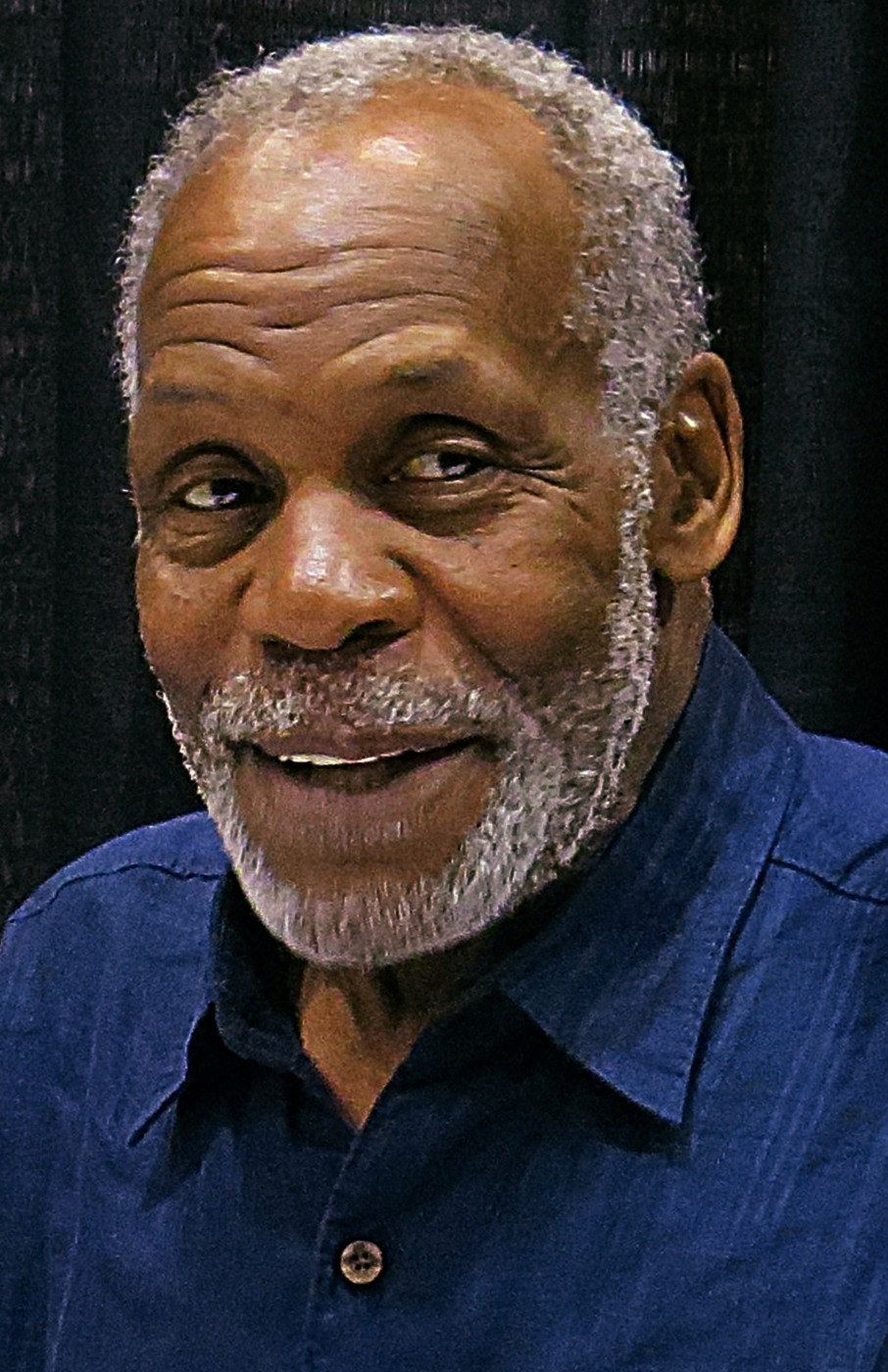
Danny Glover was honored with the President's Award

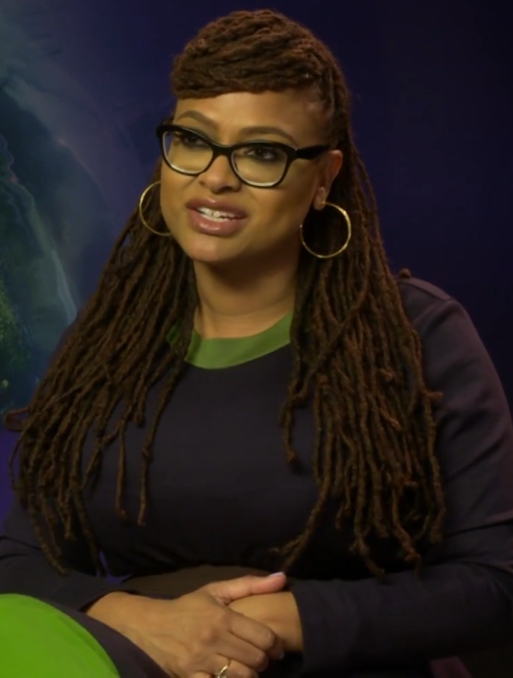
Ava DuVernay was honored with the Entertainer of the Year Award

Vanguard Award
- **The surviving 1968 Memphis Sanitation Strike "I Am a Man" workers**
President's Award
- **Danny Glover**
Chairman's Award
- **William Lucy**
Entertainer of the Year
- **Ava DuVernay**
- Bruno Mars
- Chance the Rapper
- Issa Rae
- Jay-Z

== Motion Picture ==
**Outstanding Motion Picture**: **Girls Trip**; Detroit; Get Out; Marshall; Roman J. Israel, Esq.	**Outstanding Directing in a Motion Picture**: **Jordan Peele – Get Out**; Reginald Hudlin – Marshall; Malcolm D. Lee – Girls Trip; Stella Meghie – Everything, Everything; Dee Rees – Mudbound
**Outstanding Actor in a Motion Picture**: **Daniel Kaluuya – Get Out**; Chadwick Boseman – Marshall; Idris Elba – The Mountain Between Us; Algee Smith – Detroit; Denzel Washington – Roman J. Israel, Esq.	**Outstanding Actress in a Motion Picture**: **Octavia Spencer – Gifted**; Halle Berry – Kidnap; Danai Gurira – All Eyez on Me; Natalie Paul – Crown Heights; Amandla Stenberg – Everything, Everything
**Outstanding Supporting Actor in a Motion Picture**: **Idris Elba – Thor: Ragnarok**; Nnamdi Asomugha – Crown Heights; Sterling K. Brown – Marshall; Laurence Fishburne – Last Flag Flying; Lil Rel Howery – Get Out	**Outstanding Supporting Actress in a Motion Picture**: **Tiffany Haddish – Girls Trip**; Regina Hall – Girls Trip; Audra McDonald – Beauty and the Beast; Keesha Sharp – Marshall; Tessa Thompson – Thor: Ragnarok
**Outstanding Writing in a Motion Picture**: **Jordan Peele – Get Out**; Kenya Barris and Tracy Oliver – Girls Trip; Mark Boal – Detroit; Emily V. Gordon and Kumail Nanjiani – The Big Sick; Dee Rees and Virgil Williams – Mudbound	**Outstanding Independent Motion Picture**: **Detroit**; Last Flag Flying; Mudbound; Professor Marston and the Wonder Women; Wind River

== Television ==
Best Series
Outstanding Drama Series	Outstanding Comedy Series
**Power**; Greenleaf; Queen Sugar; This Is Us; Underground	**Black-ish**; Ballers; Dear White People; Insecure; Survivor's Remorse
Outstanding Television Movie, Limited-Series or Dramatic Special	Outstanding Variety or Game Show – (Series or Special)
**The New Edition Story**; Flint; The Immortal Life of Henrietta Lacks; Shots Fired; When Love Kills: The Falicia Blakely Story	**Lip Sync Battle**; Black Girls Rock! 2017; Dave Chappelle: The Age of Spin & Deep in the Heart of Texas; Def Comedy Jam 25; Saturday Night Live
Outstanding Children's Program
**Doc McStuffins**; Free Rein; Nella the Princess Knight; Project Mc2; Raven's Home
Best Acting in a Drama Series
Outstanding Actor in a Drama Series	Outstanding Actress in a Drama Series
**Omari Hardwick – Power**; Sterling K. Brown – This Is Us; Mike Colter – The Defenders; Terrence Howard – Empire; Kofi Siriboe – Queen Sugar	**Taraji P. Henson – Empire**; Viola Davis – How to Get Away with Murder; Jurnee Smollett-Bell – Underground; Kerry Washington – Scandal; Rutina Wesley – Queen Sugar
Outstanding Supporting Actor in a Drama Series	Outstanding Supporting Actress in a Drama Series
**Joe Morton – Scandal**; Trai Byers – Empire; Bryshere Gray – Empire; Jussie Smollett – Empire; Dondre Whitfield – Queen Sugar	**Naturi Naughton – Power**; Tina Lifford – Queen Sugar; Susan Kelechi Watson – This Is Us; Lynn Whitfield – Greenleaf; Samira Wiley – The Handmaid's Tale
Best Acting in a Comedy Series
Outstanding Actor in a Comedy Series	Outstanding Actress in a Comedy Series
**Anthony Anderson – Black-ish**; Aziz Ansari – Master of None; Dwayne Johnson – Ballers; Keegan-Michael Key – Friends from College; RonReaco Lee – Survivor's Remorse	**Tracee Ellis Ross – Black-ish**; Danielle Brooks – Orange Is the New Black; Loretta Devine – The Carmichael Show; Niecy Nash – Claws; Issa Rae – Insecure
Outstanding Supporting Actor in a Comedy Series	Outstanding Supporting Actress in a Comedy Series
**Jay Ellis – Insecure**; Tituss Burgess – Unbreakable Kimmy Schmidt; Ernie Hudson – Grace and Frankie; Omar Miller – Ballers; John David Washington – Ballers	**Marsai Martin – Black-ish**; Uzo Aduba – Orange Is the New Black; Tichina Arnold – Survivor's Remorse; Leslie Jones – Saturday Night Live; Yvonne Orji – Insecure
Best Acting in a Movie/Limited Series
Outstanding Actor in a Television Movie, Limited-Series or Dramatic Special	Outstanding Actress in a Television Movie, Limited-Series or Dramatic Special
**Idris Elba – Guerrilla**; Laurence Fishburne – Madiba; Bryshere Gray – The New Edition Story; Woody McClain – The New Edition Story; Mack Wilds – Shots Fired	**Queen Latifah – Flint**; Regina King – American Crime; Sanna Lathan – Shots Fired; Jill Scott – Flint; Oprah Winfrey – The Immortal Life of Henrietta Lacks
Outstanding Performance by a Youth (Series, Special, Television Movie or Limited Series)
**Caleb McLaughlin – Stranger Things**; Lonnie Chavis – This Is Us; Ethan Hutchison – Queen Sugar; Marsai Martin – Black-ish; Michael Rainey – Power
Reality & Variety
Outstanding Talk Series	Outstanding Reality Program/Reality Competition Series
**The Real**; The Daily Show with Trevor Noah; Jimmy Kimmel Live; Super Soul Sunday; The View	**The Manns**; Iyanla: Fix My Life; Martha & Snoop's Potluck Dinner Party; Shark Tank; United Shades of America
Outstanding News / Information – (Series or Special)	Outstanding Host in a Talk, Reality, News/ Information or Variety (Series or Special)
**Unsung**; News One Now; Oprah's Master Class; The Story of Us with Morgan Freeman; Through the Fire: The Legacy of Barack Obama	**Roland S. Martin – NewsOne Now**; Neil deGrasse Tyson – StarTalk with Neil deGrasse Tyson; Morgan Freeman – The Story of Us with Morgan Freeman; Trevor Noah – The Daily Show with Trevor Noah; Fredricka Whitfield – Fredricka Whitfield
Directing
Outstanding Directing in a Dramatic Series	Outstanding Directing in a Comedy Series
**Carl Franklin – 13 Reasons Why – "Tape 5, Side B"**; Jeffrey Byrd – Switched at Birth – "Occupy Truth"; Jonathan Demme – Shots Fired – "Hour Six: The Fire This Time"; Ernest R. Dickerson – The Deuce – "Show and Prove"; Gina Prince-Bythewood – Shots Fired – "Hour One: Pilot"	**Anton Cropper – Black-ish – "Juneteenth"**; Barry Jenkins – Dear White People – "Chapter 5"; Spike Lee – She's Gotta Have It – "#NolasChoice"; Justin Simien – Dear White People – "Chapter 1"; Ken Whittingham – Unbreakable Kimmy Schmidt – "Kimmy Bites an Onion!"
Outstanding Directing in a Television Movie or Special
**Allen Hughes – The Defiant Ones**; Mark Ford – Biggie: The Life of Notorious B.I.G.; Kevin Hooks – Madiba; Codie Elaine Oliver – Black Love; Chris Robinson – The New Edition Story – "Night 1"
Writing
Outstanding Writing in a Dramatic Series	Outstanding Writing in a Comedy Series
**Gina Prince-Bythewood – Shots Fired – "Hour One: Pilot"**; Erica Anderson – Greenleaf – "The Bear"; Ava DuVernay – Queen Sugar – "Dream Variations"; Vera Herbert – This Is Us – "Still Here"; Anthony Sparks – Queen Sugar – "What Do I Care for Morning"	**Janine Barrois – Claws – "Batsh*t"**; Aziz Ansari – Master of None – "Thanksgiving"; Issa Rae – Insecure – "Hella Great"; Issa Rae – Insecure – "Hella Perspective"; Justin Simien – Dear White People – "Chapter 1"
Outstanding Writing in a Television Movie or Special
**Abdul Williams – The New Edition Story**; May Chan – An American Girl Story - Ivy & Julie 1976: A Happy Balance; Peter Landseman, Alexander Woo and George C. Wolfe – The Immortal Life of Henrietta Lacks; Alison McDonald – An American Girl Story - Ivy & Julie 1976: Summer Camp, Friends for Life; Cas Sigers-Beedles – When Love Kills: The Falicia Blakely Story

== Documentary ==
=== Outstanding Documentary – (Film) ===
- **STEP**
  - I Called Him Morgan
  - The Rape of Recy Taylor
  - Tell Them We Are Rising: The Story of Black Colleges and Universities
  - Whose Streets?

=== Outstanding Documentary – (Television) ===
- **The 44th President: In His Own Words**
  - Birth of a Movement
  - Black Love
  - The Defiant Ones
  - What the Health

== Animated/CGI ==
=== Outstanding Character Voice-Over Performance – (Television or Film) ===
- **Tiffany Haddish – Legends of Chamberlain Heights**
  - Yvette Nicole Brown – Elena of Avalor
  - Loretta Devine – Doc McStuffins
  - David Oyelowo – The Lion Guard
  - Kerry Washington – Cars 3

== Music ==
=== Outstanding New Artist ===
- **SZA – Ctrl**
  - Demetria McKinney – Officially Yours
  - Khalid – American Teen
  - Kevin Ross – The Awakening
  - Vic Mensa – The Autobiography

=== Outstanding Male Artist ===
- **Bruno Mars – "Versace on the Floor"**
  - JAY-Z – 4:44
  - Kendrick Lamar – Damn
  - Brian McKnight – Genesis
  - Charlie Wilson – In It to Win It

=== Outstanding Female Artist ===
- **Mary J. Blige – Strength of a Woman**
  - Beyoncé – "Die with You"
  - Andra Day – "Stand Up For Something"
  - Ledisi – Let Love Rule
  - SZA – Ctrl

=== Outstanding Duo, Group or Collaboration ===
- **Kendrick Lamar feat. Rihanna – "LOYALTY."**
  - Mary J. Blige feat. Kanye West – "Love Yourself"
  - Andra Day feat. Common – "Stand Up For Something"
  - SZA feat. Travis Scott – "Love Galore"
  - Charlie Wilson feat. T.I. – "I'm Blessed"

=== Outstanding Jazz Album ===
- **Somi – Petite Afrique**
  - Damien Escobar – Boundless
  - Najee – Poetry in Motion
  - Cécile McLorin Salvant – Dreams and Daggers
  - Preservation Hall Jazz Band – So It Is

=== Outstanding Gospel Album – Traditional or Contemporary ===
- **Greenleaf Soundtrack – Greenleaf Soundtrack Volume 2**
  - Tasha Cobbs – Heart. Passion. Pursuit.
  - Travis Greene – Crossover Live From Music City
  - Marvin Sapp – Close
  - CeCe Winans – Let Them Fall In Love

=== Outstanding Music Video ===
- **Bruno Mars – "That's What I Like"**
  - Mary J. Blige – "Strength of a Woman"
  - JAY-Z – "4:44"
  - Maxwell – "Gods"
  - Ledisi – "High"

=== Outstanding Song, Traditional ===
- **Bruno Mars – "That's What I Like"**
  - Mary J. Blige – "U + Me (Love Lesson)"
  - Ledisi – "High"
  - John Legend – "Surefire (Piano Version)"
  - MAJOR. – "Honest"

=== Outstanding Song, Contemporary ===
- **Kendrick Lamar – "HUMBLE."**
  - JAY-Z – "The Story of O.J."
  - Mali Music – "Gonna Be Alright"
  - Jazmine Sullivan x Bryson Tiller – "Insecure"
  - SZA feat. Travis Scott – "Love Galore"

=== Outstanding Album ===
- **Kendrick Lamar – Damn**
  - Mary J. Blige – Strength of a Woman
  - JAY-Z – 4:44
  - Brian McKnight – Genesis
  - Charlie Wilson – In It to Win It

== Literature ==
=== Outstanding Literary Work, Fiction ===
- **Henry Louis Gates Jr. and Maria Tatar – The Annotated African American Folktales**
  - Marita Golden – The Wide Circumference of Love
  - Celeste Ng – Little Fires Everywhere
  - Jesmyn Ward – Sing, Unburied, Sing
  - Stephanie Powell Watts – No One Is Coming to Save Us

=== Outstanding Literary Work, Non-Fiction ===
- **Dick Gregory – Defining Moments in Black History: Reading Between the Lies**
  - Herb Boyd – Black Detroit – A People’s History of Self-Determination
  - Paul Butler – Chokehold: Policing Black Men
  - Ta-Nehisi Coates – We Were Eight Years in Power: An American Tragedy
  - Adrian Miller – The President's Kitchen Cabinet: The Story of the African Americans Who Have Fed Our First Families, from the Washingtons to the Obamas

=== Outstanding Literary Work, Debut Author ===
- **Stephanie Powell Watts – No One Is Coming to Save Us**
  - Devin Allen – A Beautiful Ghetto
  - Leland Melvin – Chasing Spaces: An Astronaut’s Story of Grit, Grace & Second Chances
  - Gabrielle Union – We're Going to Need More Wine
  - Patricia Williams with Jeannine Amber – Rabbit: The Autobiography of Ms. Pat

=== Outstanding Literary Work, Biography/Auto-Biography ===
- **Susan Burton and Cari Lynn – Becoming Ms. Burton - From Prison to Recovery to Leading the Fight for Incarcerated Women**
  - Peter Baker – Obama: The Call of History
  - Jonathan Eig – Ali: A Life
  - Lawrence P. Jackson – Chester B. Himes
  - Gabrielle Union – We're Going to Need More Wine

=== Outstanding Literary Work, Instructional ===
- **Tererai Trent – The Awakened Woman: Remembering & Reigniting Our Sacred Dreams**
  - Misty Copeland – Ballerina Body: Dancing and Eating Your Way to a Leaner, Stronger, and More Graceful You
  - Kelvin Davis – Notoriously Dapper - How to Be A Modern Gentleman with Manners, Style and Body Confidence
  - Kristen Kish with Meredith Erickson – Kristen Kish Cooking
  - Sheri Riley – Exponential Living - Stop Spending 100% of Your Time on 10% of Who You Are

=== Outstanding Literary Work, Poetry ===
- **Patricia Smith – Incendiary Art: Poems**
  - Cameron Barnett – The Drowning Boy's Guide to Water
  - Aja Monet – My Mother Was a Freedom Fighter
  - Ntozake Shange – Wild Beauty: New and Selected Poems
  - Marcus Wicker – Silencer

=== Outstanding Literary Work, Children ===
- **Vashti Harrison – Little Leaders: Bold Women in Black History**
  - Kareem Abdul-Jabbar with Raymond Obstfeld – Becoming Kareem: Growing Up On and Off the Court
  - Lesa Cline-Ransome and James E. Ransome – Before She Was Harriet
  - Andrea J. Loney and Keith Mallett – Take a Picture of Me, James VanDerZee!
  - Cynthia Levinson and Vanessa Brantley-Newton – The Youngest Marcher: The Story of Audrey Faye Hendricks, A Young Civil Rights Activist

=== Outstanding Literary Work, Youth/Teens ===
- **Rita Williams-Garcia and Frank Morrison – Clayton Byrd Goes Underground**
  - Kwame Alexander with Mary Rand Hess – Solo
  - Tiffany D. Jackson – Allegedly
  - Jason Reynolds - Long Way Down
  - Angie Thomas – The Hate U Give
