= Thick of It =

Thick of It may refer to:

- "Thick of It" (Mary J. Blige song), 2016
- "Thick of It" (KSI song), 2024, featuring Trippie Redd
- The Thick of It, a British comedy television series; aired 2005–2012
