= Only Love (Mary J. Blige song) =

Single by Mary J. Blige
- Released: July 12, 2018
- Length: 3:46
- Label: Republic
- Songwriters: Mary J. Blige; David Brown; Allan Felder; Warren Felder; Norman Harris; Charles Hinshaw; Ron Tyson; Andrew Wansel
- Producer: Pop & Oak

Mary J. Blige singles chronology
"Set Me Free" (2017)	"Only Love" (2018)	"Thriving" (2019)

"Only Love" is a song by American singer Mary J. Blige. It was written by Blige, Charles Hinshaw, David "Lucky Daye" Brown, Warren Felder and Andrew Wansel, and produced by Felder and Wansel under the production moniker Pop & Oak. The song is built around a sample of "Doctor Love" (1977) by American girl group First Choice. Due to the inclusion of the sample, Allan Felder, Norman Harris, and Ron Tyson are also credited as songwriters. The song was released by Republic Records as a single on July 12, 2018 and was intended for inclusion on her then-upcoming fifteenth studio album. On the charts, it peaked at number five on the US Adult R&B Songs.

== Background ==
"Only Love" was written by Mary J. Blige along with Charles Hinshaw, David "Lucky Daye" Brown, Warren Felder and Andrew Wansel. Production was helmed by Felder and Wansel under the production moniker Pop & Oak. The song is built around a sample of "Doctor Love" (1977) by American girl group First Choice. Due to the inclusion of the sample, the songwriters of "Doctor Love" – Allan Felder, Norman Harris, and Ron Tyson – are also credited as songwriters on "Only Love." Blige commented on the release via social media: "I've been in the studio working on new music and was excited to share a little bit with you all. I had a year of so many ups and downs and have come out the other side with a renewed spirit and a fresh perspective. I'm entering my next chapter with an open mind and heart. "Only Love" is where I am right now and I couldn't keep it to myself any longer!."

== Critical reception ==
SoulTracks editor Chris Rizik found that "Only Love" had Blige coming out "upbeat and sounding glorious on her new single, "Only Love." With an big Philly Soul opening derived from First Choice's "Doctor Love," the single gets listeners moving as Mary J. preaches about the glory of love." Vibe editor Lydia Arevalo declared the song a "disco-inspired single that's bound to take leave R&B fans uplifted and reminiscent." Salvatore Maicki, writing for The Fader, called the song "a vibrantly disco-tinged number that fits naturally alongside the Kaytranada collaboration from [Blige's] last album, 2017's Strength of a Woman," while HotNewHipHop found that Blige "huffs disco salt on "Only Love," [...] produced by veteran duo Pop & Oak under the reflective glare of a disco ball, where Mary likely first struck her pose in junior high."

== Chart performance ==
"Only Love" entered the top ten on the US Billboard Adult R&B Songs in the week ending September 2, 2018, becoming Blige's 23rd top ten hit on the chart. This made her the artist with the most top ten entries on the Adult R&B Songs, breaking a tie Gerald Levert to claim first place. "Only Love" eventually peaked at number five. It also peaked at number 24 on the US R&B/Hip-Hop Airplay chart.

== Credits and personnel ==
Credits adapted from the liner notes of "Only Love."

- Mary J. Blige – writer
- David "Lucky Daye" Brown – writer
- Marshall Bryant – recording assistant
- Allan Felder – writer (sample)
- Warren Felder – producer, writer
- Norman Harris – writer (sample)
- Charles Hinshaw – writer
- Jaycen Joshua – mixing
- Rashawn McLean – mixing assistant
- Jon Nettlesbey – recording assistant
- Jacob Richardsn – mixing assistant
- Mike Seabergn – mixing assistant
- Ron Tyson – writer (sample)
- Andrew Wansel – producer, writer

== Charts ==
Chart performance for "Only Love"
Chart (2018)	Peak position
US Adult R&B Songs (Billboard)	5
US R&B/Hip-Hop Airplay (Billboard)	24

== Release history ==
Release history and formats for "Only Love"
Region	Date	Format(s)	Label	Ref
United States	July 12, 2018	Digital download	Republic Records	
