= Charles Hinshaw Jr. =

American singer-songwriter

- Also known as: Prince Charlez
- Born: 1994 (age 31–32); Compton, California, U.S.
- Genres: R&B; soul; pop; hip-hop
- Occupation: Singer-songwriter
- Label: Universal Music Publishing Group

Charles Hinshaw Jr., also known as "Prince Charlez", is an American singer and songwriter, best known for co-writing Rihanna's "Needed Me", Usher"s "More", and Beyoncé's "Ring Off".

At 16, Hinshaw began working with prolific Moroccan producer RedOne, writing topline melodies. This music collaboration resulted in Usher's "More" from 2010 album Raymond v. Raymond, as well as "All of Your Life (You Need Love)" from the Backstreet Boys' 2009 album This Is Us.

== Discography ==
Projects

- Black and Gold EP (2016)
- Evolution Pt 1 EP (2017)

== Songwriting and production credits ==
Credits are courtesy of Discogs, Tidal, and AllMusic.

Title	Year	Artist	Album
"I Love Her" (Featuring Jim Jones)	2009	Marques Houston	Mr. Houston
"All of Your Life (You Need Love)"	2009	Backstreet Boys	This Is Us
"More"	2010	Usher	Raymond v. Raymond
"Beautiful"	2013	Jessica Mauboy	Beautiful
"Ring Off"	2014	Beyoncé	Beyoncé: Platinum Edition
"Feel Your Love"	2015	Saygrace	Memo (EP)
"Needed Me"	2016	Rihanna	Anti
"What Happened To" (Featuring Kevin Ross)	2016	Kevin Hart	Kevin Hart: What Now? (The Mixtape Presents Chocolate Droppa)
"Overtime" (Featuring Miguel & Justine Skye)	2016	Schoolboy Q	Blank Face LP
"Church on Sunday"	2016	Saygrace	FMA
"Hell of a Girl"	2016	Saygrace	FMA
"From You"	2016	Saygrace	FMA
"New Orleans"	2016	Saygrace	FMA
"Boys Boys Boys"	2016	Saygrace	FMA
"Love Like This" (Featuring Dok2)	2016	Hyolyn	It's Me
"10,000 Hours"	2016	Ella Mai	Change
"Rounds"	2017	K. Michelle	Kimberly: The People I Used to Know
"Talk to God"	2017	K. Michelle	Kimberly: The People I Used to Know
"Love Yourself" (Featuring Kanye West)	2017	Mary J. Blige	Strength of a Woman
"Set Me Free"	2017	Mary J. Blige	Strength of a Woman
"U + Me (Love Lesson)"	2017	Mary J. Blige	Strength of a Woman
"Makes Me Wonder"	2017	Ella Mai	Ready
"Add to Me"	2017	Ledisi	Let Love Rule
"High"	2017	Ledisi	Let Love Rule
"This X-Mas" (Featuring Ella Mai)	2017	Chris Brown	Heartbreak on a Full Moon
"Song Goes Off"	2017	Trey Songz	Tremaine the Album
"With You"	2018	Mariah Carey	Caution
"Caution"	2018	Mariah Carey	Caution
"Dangerous"	2018	Ella Mai	Ella Mai
"Choose"	2018	Why Don't We	8 Letters
"Can't You See"	2018	Why Don't We	8 Letters
"Only Love"	2018	Mary J. Blige	Non-album single
"Ya Ya Ya"	2019	Exo	Obsession
"Get Low" (With Zedd)	2019	Liam Payne	LP1
"More Than That"	2019	Lauren Jauregui	Non-album single
"Empty (interlude)"	2020	Queen Naija	Missunderstood
"Mean It"	2021	H.E.R.	Back of My Mind
"In Your Heart"	2021	Diana Ross	Thank You
"Come Together"	2021	Diana Ross	Thank You
"Tough Love" (Featuring Moneybagg Yo)	2022	Mary J. Blige	Good Morning Gorgeous
"Need Love" (Featuring Usher)	2022	Mary J. Blige	Good Morning Gorgeous
"Trying"	2022	Ella Mai	Heart on My Sleeve
"Break My Heart"	2022	Ella Mai	Heart on My Sleeve
"DFMU"	2022	Ella Mai	Heart on My Sleeve
"Hide"	2022	Ella Mai	Heart on My Sleeve
"Sink or Swim"	2022	Ella Mai	Heart on My Sleeve
"Love Language"	2023	K. Michelle	I'm the Problem
"Aliens"	2026	BTS	Arirang
"2.0"	2026	BTS	Arirang

== Guest appearances ==
List of guest appearances, with other performing artists, showing year released and album name
Title	Year	Other performer(s)	Album
"Sanford & Son"	2010	T.I., B.o.B & Mohombi	Non-album single
"West Coast State of Mind"	2010	Kendrick Lamar	Non-album single
"Smile"	2017	Mary J. Blige	Strength of a Woman
"Big Spender"	2018	Kiana Ledé	Fifty Shades Freed: Original Motion Picture Soundtrack

== Awards and nominations ==
Year	Awarding Body	Award	Result	Ref
2016	Soul Train Music Awards	Soul Train Music Award for The Ashford & Simpson Songwriter's Award ("Needed Me")	Nominated	
2022	64th Annual Grammy Awards	Grammy Award for Album of the Year (Back of My Mind)	Nominated	
2023	65th Annual Grammy Awards	Grammy Award for Album of the Year (Good Morning Gorgeous)	Nominated	
2023	ASCAP Rhythm & Soul Awards	Most-Performed Songs ("DFMU")	Won	
