= Need Me =

2019 single by J.I the Prince of N.Y

Single by J.I the Prince of N.Y

from the album Hood Life Krisis, Vol. 1
- Released: August 26, 2019
- Recorded: August 2019
- Length: 2:31
- Label: G*Starr
- Songwriters: Justin Irvin Rivera; Prince Dobere Jr.; Kaseem Moultrie; Teron Beal; Mya Harrison
- Producers: DocOnDaBeat; Dobere

J.I the Prince of N.Y singles chronology
"Blame on Me" (2019)	"Need Me" (2019)	"Brazy" (2019)

Music video
- "Need Me" on YouTube

"Need Me" is a song by American rapper J.I the Prince of N.Y, released on August 26, 2019 as the second single from his debut mixtape Hood Life Krisis, Vol. 1 (2019). It went viral upon release, becoming his breakout hit. The song was contains a sample of "Best of Me, Part 2" by Mýa featuring Jay-Z.

== Background ==
J.I. worked on the song in August 2019. In an interview with Genius, he stated that he had a sample of "Best of Me, Part 2" and played it for his producer DocOnDaBeat in the studio. Doc pulled out a piano and started coming up with a melody. At J.I's request, the drums were changed and reggae elements were added to the song to reflect the feel of summertime. J.I did not record as they composed the beat because he wanted to write to it at home, but two weeks later he returned to the studio and freestyled it anyway.

In an interview with DJBooth, J.I revealed that he did not like the song when he made it, thinking it was "wack", and was surprised that it became successful.

== Composition ==
"Need Me" is a melodic song that incorporates reggae and dancehall influences. The mood contrasts the upbeat instrumental as J.I details his pain and sorrow. J.I also interpolates "Turn Me On" by Kevin Lyttle in the bridge.

== Critical reception ==
DJBooth gave a positive review, writing "As much as music writers love the phrase 'earworm,' there are few other words to describe J.I.'s 'Need Me.' His raps are pristine, and his melodies are fluid. The keys twinkle, and the kicks are crispy. 'Need Me' is a perfectly made hip-hop single for 2020, sure, but it's not the end of J.I.'s ability." Alphonse Pierre of Pitchfork called it a "bright-but-macho love song".

== Charts ==
Chart (2020)	Peak position
US Billboard Hot 100	95
US Hot R&B/Hip-Hop Songs (Billboard)	44

== Certifications ==
Region	Certification	Certified units/sales
United States (RIAA)	Platinum	1,000,000^{‡}
^{‡} Sales+streaming figures based on certification alone.
