= U + Me (Love Lesson) =

Single by Mary J. Blige

from the album Strength of a Woman
- Released: February 17, 2017
- Recorded: 2016
- Genre: Soul
- Length: 4:59
- Label: Capitol
- Songwriters: Brandon "B.A.M." Hodge; Charles Hinshaw; David D. Brown; Mary J. Blige
- Producer: Brandon "B.A.M." Hodge

Mary J. Blige singles chronology
"American Skin (41 Shots)" (2016)	"U + Me (Love Lesson)" (2017)	"Love Yourself" (2017)

"U + Me (Love Lesson)" is a song by American singer Mary J. Blige from her 13th studio album, Strength of a Woman (2017). It was released on February 17, 2017, as the album's second single. Brandon "B.A.M." Hodge produced "U + Me (Love Lesson)" and co-wrote it with Charles Hinshaw, David D. Brown, and Mary J. Blige. It is a soul ballad, and its lyrics revolve around a breakup.

Music critics identified its message as similar to that of Blige's previous single, "Thick of It" (2016). "U + Me (Love Lesson)" received positive reviews from critics for its composition and lyrics. The single charted on several Billboard charts, peaking at number one on the Adult R&B Songs chart. Blige promoted the song through live performances.

== Recording and release ==
Brandon "B.A.M." Hodge produced "U + Me (Love Lesson)" and co-wrote it with Charles Hinshaw, David D. Brown, and Mary J. Blige. Hinshaw also provided background vocals. Jaymz Hardy-Martin III recorded and mixed the track, and David Kim worked as an assistant mixer. The vocals were recorded by Marshall Bryant, with assistance from Dexter Randall. The single was recorded at Windmark Recording in Santa Monica, California, engineered at the Marvin's Room, and mixed at the Chalice Recording Studio—both in Los Angeles.

Capitol released "U + Me (Love Lesson)" as a digital download on February 17, 2017. It was the second single from Blige's 13th studio album, Strength of a Woman (2017). On May 2, 2017, she sang it at the iHeartRadio Theater in New York City. On May 19, 2017, Blige performed the song as part of a medley during Today's Citi Concert series.

== Composition and lyrics ==
"U + Me (Love Lesson)"
An audio sample of Mary J. Blige's single "U + Me (Love Lesson)"; the instrumental was described as "trap-influenced sub-bass and heavier drum programming" and "skittish modern beats".

Lasting four minutes and 59-seconds, (Note: "U + Me (Love Lesson)" is four minutes and 56-seconds on the album, and five minutes on Blige's Vevo account.) "U + Me (Love Lesson)" is a midtempo soul ballad. Michael Saponara of Vibe wrote that it contained elements of soul music, and Andy Kellman of AllMusic interpreted the composition as "a machine-soul ballad". Ammar Kalia of Clash described the instrumental as composed of "trap-influenced sub-bass and heavier drum programming", and Andy Gill of The Independent wrote that the song shared the same "skittish modern beats" as Blige's single "Love Yourself" (2017).

Kyle Eustice of HipHopDX described the single as a "sultry breakup ballad" with lyrics referencing Blige's divorce from Kendu Issacs. Eustice wrote that the song revolves around "bouncing back from a devastating blow". Music critics compared the song's message to that of Blige's previous single "Thick of It" (2016). Andy Kellman felt that it "could not have been made at any other point in Blige's career". Lyrics include: "The lies you told to me make it easy for me to leave, You plus me wasn't the best thing" and "And I just can't deny the fact / we don't belong together / Guess it ain't the real thing." She talks about a relationship that does not add up to a happy ending singing: "You plus me was a love lesson / In too deep with our imperfections." Blige also sings about getting over a breakup with the lyrics: "Gotta keep on pushin' / Love myself through the hard times."

== Reception ==
The song received a positive critical response. Praising how listeners could relate to the song's lyrics, a Jet writer said that Blige had "another vocal peak". Kylie Eustice wrote that Blige "turned [her] pain into art", and Michael Saponara described the song as "a therapeutic anthem to anyone going through a bad break up or tough times with a loved one". Ammar Kalia enjoyed how the single differed from the "orchestral swells" typically used in Blige's music, and referred to it as "refreshing". Soul Bounce's D-Money commended the song for its "undeniable head nod factor and empowering lyrics".

"U + Me (Love Lesson)" charted on several Billboard charts. The song peaked at number 18 on the R&B Songs Billboard chart on May 27, 2017, and stayed on the chart for five weeks. It reached number 11 on the R&B/Hip-Hop Airplay Billboard chart on May 20, 2017, and remained on the chart for 20 weeks. The single peaked at number one on the Adult R&B Songs Billboard chart on May 6, 2017, and remained on the chart for 25 weeks. "U + Me (Love Lesson)" reached number eight on the Billboard Adult R&B songs year-end chart. The song received a nomination for Outstanding Song, Traditional at the 2018 NAACP Image Awards.

== Track listing ==
Digital download
No.	Title	Length
1.	"U + Me (Love Lesson)"	4:59

== Personnel ==
- Backing Vocals – Charles "Prince Charlez" Hinshaw
- Engineer [Additional] – Marshall Bryant, Michael Frenke
- Mixed By [Assistant] – David Kim
- Mixed By, Recorded By – Jaymz Hardy-Martin III
- Producer – Brandon "B.A.M." Hodge
- Recorded By [Additional, Assistant] – Dexter Randall
- Recorded By [Additional] – Marshall Bryant
- Written-By – Brandon Hodge, Charles Hinshaw, David D. Brown, Mary J. Blige

== Charts ==
=== Weekly charts ===
Chart (2017)	Peak position
US Adult R&B Songs (Billboard)	1
US R&B/Hip-Hop Airplay (Billboard)	11

=== Year-end charts ===
Chart (2017)	Position
US Adult R&B Songs (Billboard)	8

== Release history ==
Country	Date	Format	Label	Ref.
United States	February 17, 2017	Digital download	Capitol	
