= Devin Allen =

American photographer, photojournalist, and activist

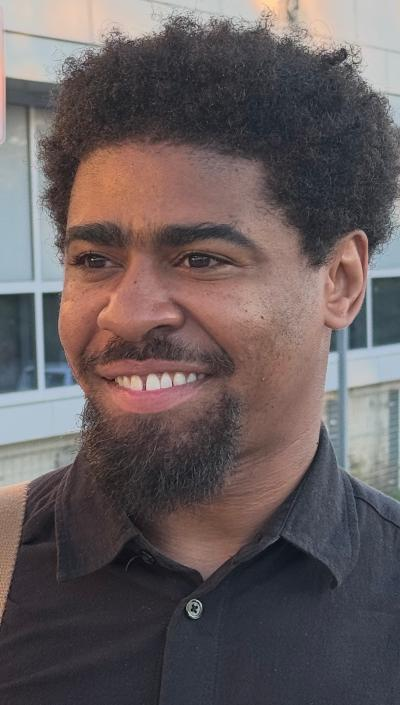
- Allen in Gaithersburg, MD, June 2026
- Born: Baltimore, Maryland
- Known for: photography
- Website: https://www.bydvnlln.com/

Devin Allen is an American photographer, photojournalist, and activist based in Baltimore, Maryland. He gained national attention after the Freddie Gray protests in 2015, when his documentary photograph entitled "Baltimore Uprising" was published as Time magazine's May 2015 cover photo. His documentary photo of the George Floyd protests was published as Time's June 2020 cover.

Allen's photographs are held in the Smithsonian collection of the National Museum of African American History and Culture.

== Career ==
=== Baltimore Uprising and other projects (2015–2019) ===
Allen gained national attention and media prominence after the 2015 protests following the death of Freddie Gray. However, Allen shared his first protest photographs a year later, following the police killing of Michael Brown, an 18-year old black-male resident of Ferguson, Missouri on August 9, 2014. The murder sparked protests across the neighborhood where the incident took place.

After the death of Freddie Gray on April 12, 2015, Allen—who grew up five minutes from where the Baltimore police murdered Freddie Gray—documented the protests and posted his subsequent photos on Instagram. Across three weeks of the protests, Allen took around 10,000 photos. His images capturing the protests went viral and were covered by the BBC, The Washington Post, The New York Times , and others.

A photo Allen took of the protests on April 25, 2015 was chosen as Time magazine's May 2015 cover, making Allen the third amateur photographer to be featured on the cover of Time. The photograph, titled Baltimore Uprising, shows a man running away from a pack of charging police officers in the city of Baltimore. After Allen uploaded the photograph from his camera to his phone, it took him several hours to realize the photograph had gone viral, as he had continued photographing the protests until after dark that evening.

In 2015, building off his recent media attention from Time magazine, Allen launched "Through Their Eyes", a youth program that teaches photography to Baltimore city school students, specifically those from districts with underfunded arts education programs. The program includes giving cameras to students, as well as organizing educational workshops and art exhibitions of student work.

In 2016, Allen's photography exhibit "A Beautiful Ghetto" was held at the Gallery Slought. In 2017, Allen published his first photography book as a coffee table book titled A Beautiful Ghetto. The book was nominated for the 49th NAACP Image Awards in the category of "Outstanding Literary Work – Debut Author".

Allen was selected as the first recipient of the Gordon Parks Foundation Fellowship in 2017. The Fellowship supported the continuation of his "Through Their Eyes" project.

=== George Floyd protests (2020–present) ===
After the murder of George Floyd, a Black American killed during arrest by a white police officer named Derek Chauvin, Allen attended a Baltimore protest on June 5, 2020 organized by demonstrators representing the city's Black transgender community. At the protest, he captured a photograph that was featured on the cover of Time magazine. The photograph shows a protester sitting with a megaphone, while other demonstrators lie down on the ground.

In July 2020, Allen was selected as a Leica Ambassador.

== Personal life ==
Allen was born and raised in West Baltimore. As of 2020, Allen is still active in the Baltimore community and says that his goal when documenting events like the protests is to make sure he tells the whole story.

According to a report on National Public Radio (NPR), Devin Allen received his first camera as a gift from his grandmother in 2013. It was a Canon camera that she bought on credit from Best Buy, as per NPR.
