= Best of Me, Part 2 =

2000 song composed by Jay-Z performed by Mýa

Single by Mýa featuring Jay-Z

from the album DJ Clue? Presents: Backstage Mixtape
- Released: August 29, 2000
- Recorded: 2000
- Genre: Hip-hop
- Length: 3:41
- Label: Roc-A-Fella; Def Jam
- Songwriters: Samuel Barnes; Teron Beal; Shawn Carter; Larry Gates; Marcel Hall; Mýa Harrison; Jean Claude-Oliver; Marlon Williams
- Producer: Trackmasters

Mýa singles chronology
"Case of the Ex" (2000)	"Best of Me, Part 2" (2000)	"Girls Dem Sugar" (2000)

Jay-Z singles chronology
"Hey Papi" (2000)	"Best of Me, Part 2" (2000)	"Is That Your Chick (The Lost Verses)" (2000)

"Best of Me, Part 2" is a song by American singer Mýa featuring American rapper Jay-Z. It is significantly different from the original version, both musically and lyrically. "Best of Me, Part 2" served as the second single from DJ Clue?'s album DJ Clue? Presents: Backstage Mixtape (2000), the soundtrack to the 2000 documentary film, Backstage. The remix was written and composed by Harrison, Teron Beal, Shawn Carter, Larry Gates, Marcel Hall, Trackmasters duo Samuel Barnes and Jean Claude-Oliver, and Marlon Williams (Marley Marl), and samples an interpolation of the 1987 song "Make the Music with Your Mouth, Biz", performed by Biz Markie.

While "Best of Me, Part 2" failed to chart on Billboard's US Hot 100, it performed modestly on Billboard's component Hot R&B/Hip-Hop Singles & Tracks chart, on which it debuted and peaked at number fifty-five. Well received by music critics, it was ranked 40th on About.com's "Top 50 Rap and R&B Collaborations" list in 2012. The video was shot in Malibu, California. Harrison can be seen strutting along the beach and behind a white screen wearing a jersey dress.

== Background ==
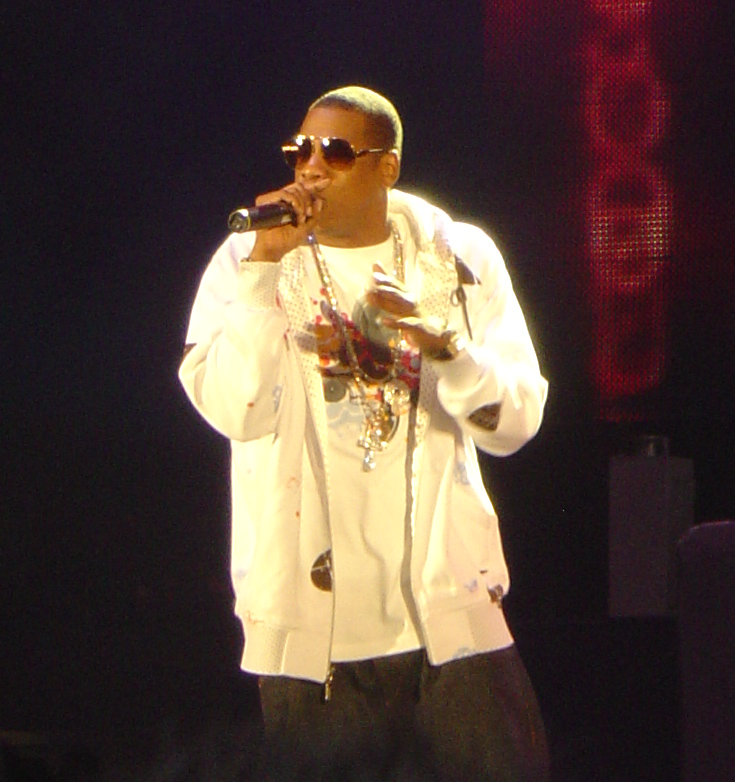
Jay-Z made a featured guest appearance and lent his voice to the track.

"Best of Me, Part 2" was composed by Mýa Harrison and production duo Trackmasters along with Teron Beal, Larry Gates, and rapper Jay-Z sampling an interpolation of Biz Markie's 1987 song "Make the Music with Your Mouth, Biz", which was produced by Marley Marl. During the recording process though, tension rose between Harrison and Jay-Z. However, eventually the conflict was resolved and Jay-Z and Mýa were able to put their differences aside and find a mutual respect for each other. After dissolving their conflict Jay-Z agreed to record his vocals on the track.

Speaking on its creation, Tone of Trackmasters commented, "Steve Stoute was head of black music over at Interscope and at the time we were still his guys. He wanted a remix so we went in and knocked the remix out. I remember Mýa couldn't cut the vocals properly and it took forever. When it was done, we wanted Jay-Z on it. So Jay came to the studio that night at The Hit Factory. He got it right away he understood what it was but he didn’t like Mýa’s vibe in the room. He looked at her like she was a spoiled brat because she was. He looked at her like, ‘I'm about to rap on your record, you're about to have a hit, and I don’t think you really appreciate it. She was like this new artist on Interscope, she didn’t even really understand what was going on. So he didn’t do the record when he got there. Once again, he gave a preview of what it was gonna sound like, but he didn’t do the record because he didn’t feel like it. So he left and we had to tell Mýa like, ‘Yo Mýa, Jay wants to do the record but he feels like you’re not even giving him any love, like no thank you or none of that.’ But that's just her personality. So we went to L.A. for some music awards were around that time and we had one more shot at getting Jay to come to the studio. And obviously Jay came in and Mýa was more cordial towards Jay. He laid the rhyme down, Steve asked for a shoutout, and that’s basically it. That’s a good record and Jay-Z charged her through the nose for it."

== Commercial performance ==
The "Best of Me Part II" debuted and peaked at number fifty-five on Billboard's Hot R&B/Hip-Hop Singles & Tracks chart issue dated August 19, 2000. It spent a total of twenty consecutive weeks on the chart altogether.

== Legacy ==
Though "Best of Me, Part 2" was never a commercial success at mainstream radio, it has since developed a cult following within the Hip hop community while sparking a hip-hop fashion trend as well. Revolt praised "Best of Me, Part 2" as one Trackmasters track that will forever be dope. Mýa has been credited as the foremother of the jersey dress crusade, highlighted by her UNC Michael Jordan ensemble in the classic 2000 video — with Jay-Z — for "Best of Me, Part 2." Complex featured Mýa on their 8 Most Iconic Sports Jersey Moments in Rap Videos list. In addition, Complex featured The Best of Me, Part 2 on their The 50 Best R&B Songs With Rap Features list. In June 2023, the singer re-created the UNC jersey dress from the "Best of Me (Part 2)" video, while she was performing at Charlotte R&B Music Experience causing Twitter to react and creating a viral moment. The short video bringing back memories, garnered reaction on social media as different outlets re-shared the video.

Young Money recording artist Shanell covered "Best of Me, Part 2" as part of her "Throwback Music Thursday Series." Brooklyn indie rapper Donmonique sampled "Best of Me, Part 2" for her mixtape Black Kate Moss (2016). Canadian rapper Tory Lanez sampled "Best of Me, Part 2" for his album Chixtape 5 (2019). Brooklyn rapper J.I the Prince of N.Y sampled the song for his single "Need Me".

== Formats and track listings ==
- US 12" single and maxi-single
1. "The Best of Me" (Holla Remix Main – Clean) – 3:52
2. "The Best of Me" (Holla Remix Main) – 3:52
3. "The Best of Me" (Holla Remix Instrumental) – 3:15
4. "The Best of Me" (Holla Remix Acapella) – 3:25
5. "The Best of Me" (Holla Remix Beat Box – Clean) – 3:52
6. "The Best of Me" (Holla Remix Beat Box) – 3:52
7. "The Best of Me" (Holla Remix Beat Box Instrumental) – 3:15
8. "The Best of Me" (Holla Remix Beat Box Acapella) – 3:25

== Charts ==
Chart (2000)	Peak position
US Hot R&B/Hip-Hop Songs (Billboard)	55
US R&B/Hip-Hop Airplay (Billboard)	47
