= Favorite Song (Toosii song) =

2023 single by Toosii

Single by Toosii

from the album Naujour
- Released: February 17, 2023
- Genre: R&B
- Length: 3:29
- Label: South Coast Music Group; Capitol
- Songwriters: Nau'Jour Lazier Grainger; Adelso Sicaju; Tatiana Manaois
- Producers: Adelso; Tatiana Manaois

Toosii singles chronology
"Magic Potion" (2023)	"Favorite Song" (2023)

Music video
- "Favorite Song" on YouTube

"Favorite Song" is a song by American rapper and singer Toosii, released on February 17, 2023, serving as the lead single from his second studio album, Naujour. It was produced by ADELSO and Tatiana Manaois (who also provides background vocals on the song). The slow R&B beat with a sample sees Toosii sing about him being the perfect valentine for his partner. A remix with fellow American singer Khalid, along with a remix entitled as the "Toxic Version" with fellow American rapper Future, were respectively released on May 5 and May 19.

== Background ==
A snippet of the song was first uploaded to his TikTok profile on January 7, 2023. Following the upload, the song garnered major attention across the platform as Toosii teased a Valentine's Day release if the song gained 100,000 pre-saves.

== Composition ==
"Favorite Song" utilizes a prominent sample from the song's producer Tatiana Manaois's November 2022 song, "You Might as Well". The sample builds the flow for the rest of the track and helps Toosii build the layers of the song in which he sings about his love for his girlfriend and how to treat his girlfriend correctly.

== Critical reception ==
The Music Universe's Buddy Iahn noted that on the song, Toosii is "singing directly to those stinging with hurt and yearning for an intuitive, compassionate relationship." Quincy from Rating Game Music described the "romantic" track as "one of those touching tracks that carefully straddles the line between country music and hip-hop music." He concludes his review by stating that "Toosii talks about being a great support system and willing lover to a special someone" and that "by the time you listen to the track two or three times in a row, it will get stuck in your head right next to your Netflix password."

== Commercial performance ==
Debuting with 9.7 million U.S. streams, Toosii's "Favorite Song" debuted at number 51 on the Billboard Hot 100, marking his first entry on the chart. He also made his first appearance on the Billboard Global 200, debuting at number 192 on the chart. It would later respectively peak at 5 and 25 on the Hot 100 and Global 200.

Prior to the song's release, it had gone viral on the video-sharing app TikTok earning over 60,000 videos made using the snippet sound. The track now has over 300,000 videos made to the track on the platform.

== Credits and personnel ==
Credits adapted from Tidal.

- Toosii – vocals, songwriting, recording engineer
- Adelso – co-production, songwriting
- Tatiana Manaois – co-production, songwriting
- Jaycen Joshua – mastering, mixing engineer
- Mike Seaberg – mixing engineer
- DJ Riggins – assistant mixing engineer
- Jacob Richards – assistant mixing engineer
- Rachel Blum – assistant mixing engineer

== Charts ==
=== Weekly charts ===
Chart performance for "Favorite Song"
Chart (2023)	Peak position
Australia Hitseekers (ARIA)	2
Australia Hip Hop/R&B (ARIA)	32
Canada (Canadian Hot 100)	41
Global 200 (Billboard)	25
New Zealand (Recorded Music NZ)	39
UK Singles (OCC)	87
US Billboard Hot 100	5
US Adult Top 40 (Billboard)	37
US Hot R&B/Hip-Hop Songs (Billboard)	2
US Mainstream Top 40 (Billboard)	11
US Rhythmic (Billboard)	2

Chart performance for "Favorite Song" (Remix)
Chart (2023)	Peak position
New Zealand Hot Singles (RMNZ)	21

=== Year-end charts ===
Year-end chart performance for "Favorite Song"
Chart (2023)	Position
Canada (Canadian Hot 100)	100
Global 200 (Billboard)	127
US Billboard Hot 100	21
US Hot R&B/Hip-Hop Songs (Billboard)	6
US Mainstream Top 40 (Billboard)	37
US Rhythmic (Billboard)	16

== Certifications ==
Certifications for "Favorite Song"
Region	Certification	Certified units/sales
Canada (Music Canada)	Platinum	80,000^{‡}
New Zealand (RMNZ)	Platinum	30,000^{‡}
United Kingdom (BPI)	Silver	200,000^{‡}
United States (RIAA)	5× Platinum	5,000,000^{‡}
^{‡} Sales+streaming figures based on certification alone.
