= Needed Me =

2016 single by Rihanna

Single by Rihanna

from the album Anti
- Released: March 30, 2016
- Recorded: 2014
- Studio: Westlake Recording Studios, (Los Angeles)
- Genre: Electro-R&B
- Length: 3:11
- Label: Roc Nation; Westbury Road
- Songwriters: Dijon McFarlane; Robyn Fenty; Nick Audino; Lewis Hughes; Khaled Rohaim; Te Whiti Warbrick; Adam Feeney; Brittany Hazzard; Charles Hinshaw; Derrus Rachel
- Producer: DJ Mustard

Rihanna singles chronology
"Work" (2016)	"Needed Me" and "Kiss It Better" (2016)	"This Is What You Came For" (2016)

Music video
- "Needed Me" on YouTube

"Needed Me" is a song by Barbadian singer Rihanna from her eighth album, Anti (2016). It was written by Rihanna, Brittany Hazard, Charles Hinshaw, Derrus Rachel, the producer DJ Mustard, and the co-producers Twice as Nice and Frank Dukes. Roc Nation and Westbury Road sent "Needed Me" to US urban contemporary radio on March 30, 2016, together with "Kiss It Better". Afterwards, Def Jam sent "Needed Me" to contemporary hit radio. "Needed Me" is a "mellow" dubstep-influenced electro-R&B song, that contains a downtempo and loose production with synthetic sounds and hard heavy trap beats. The song's lyrics discuss romantic rejection.

In the United States, the song peaked at number 7 on the Billboard Hot 100 becoming Rihanna's twenty-ninth Top 10 single on the chart, spending sixteen weeks in the Top 10 with continued chart traction afterward to become Rihanna's longest-charting hit. The song's accompanying music video was directed by film producer Harmony Korine and premiered on April 20, 2016, in celebration of 420. The video is set in Miami and depicts Rihanna with a gun, riding on a motor bike, before attending a strip club where she kills a man. Rihanna performed "Needed Me" during the Anti World Tour. The song received a Grammy nomination for Best R&B Performance at the 59th ceremony.

== Writing and production ==
On September 15, 2014, American producer DJ Mustard confirmed that he and Rihanna had collaborated on a song for her eighth album, Anti: "We haven't got our club record just yet but we have a ballad that I really like and that she likes too." DJ Mustard worked on fifty songs in an attempt for them to be included on Anti, "Needed Me" was one of the last songs that he worked on. Speaking about the writing and production process Mustard stated "I was at the studio and I was like "I don’t want to go, I don’t feel like going, I’ve done so many songs, she's not going to like it’... The next day they told me she liked it. It was great that I had a team (Twice as Nice) that could take me and actually get it done because if it wasn't for them I probably wouldn't have went [sic]. There would have been no ‘Needed Me’."

"Needed Me" was written by Dijon McFarlane, Rihanna, Nick Audino, Lewis Hughes, Khaled Rohaim, Te Whiti Warbrick, Adam Feeney, Brittany "Starrah" Hazzard, Charles Hinshaw and Derrus Rachel. It was produced by DJ Mustard with co-production done by Twice as Nice & Frank Dukes. "Needed Me" was recorded at the Westlake Recording Studios in Los Angeles. The vocal recording and production was done by producer Kuk Harrell while Blake Mares served as a recording and production assistant. "Needed Me" was mixed by Manny Marroquin at Larrabee Studios in Universal City, California and was assisted by Chris Galland & Ike Schultz. The song was mastered by Chris Gehringer at the Sterling Sound Studios in New York City.

== Release ==
On March 29, via her official Twitter account Rihanna confirmed that "Needed Me" alongside "Kiss It Better" would be released as follow-up singles. They impacted radio on March 30, 2016. She also revealed the artwork for both singles, with "Needed Me" showing Rihanna wearing a giant pair of jeans. Initially served to urban stations, following the single's success, Rihanna's former label, Def Jam (with whom she parted ways in 2014), confirmed they would be pushing the song to pop radio. On May 31, 2016, Rihanna released five official dance remixes for the song: R3hab remix, Salva remix, W&W remix, Attlas remix and Cosmic Dawn Club Mix.

== Composition and lyrical interpretation ==
"Needed Me"
"Needed Me" was described as a dubstep-flavored electro-R&B song featuring heavy beats and a "grinding" bassline.

"Needed Me" is a "mellowish" dubstep-flavored electro-R&B song with "trippy, trappy production", and a length of three minutes and five seconds. The song is written in the key of G minor with a tempo of 111 beats per minute. Rihanna's vocals span from F_{3} to C_{5} in the song. Her vocals throughout the verses consist of tuplets. Instrumentally, "Needed Me" features "heavy bass triggers", a "pulpy, throbbing beat" and a "buzzing, grinding bassline." It starts with Mustard's signature line "Mustard on the beat", before transforming into a "swirling, airy, atmospheric production" with "distorted, high-pitched vocal sample." Neil McCormick of The Daily Telegraph described the track as a downtempo song with synthetic sounds, elements of electro, and a loose, casual vocal. Lyrically, the song touches upon themes of romantic rejection, with Rihanna talking "about a lover who obsessively lusts after her," and expected their relationship to advance much further than a one night stand which can be seen in the lyrics: "Didn't they tell you that I was a savage? / Fuck your white horse and a carriage / Bet you never could imagine / Never told you, you could have it / You needed me".

Many critics considered it a kiss-off track. Forrest Wickman of Slate noted that lyrics stand for reversing stereotypical gender roles. On the other hand, Erin Macleod of NPR Music stated that the song's lyrics were metaphors for anti-colonialism. Macleod referred to lines such as "Didn't they tell you that I was a savage?, Fuck ya white horse and ya carriage", and stated that the phrases seem to be that of a conversation between two lovers but could possibly be speaking against the larger narrative of colonialism. Jon Caramanica of The New York Times wrote that Rihanna sings "about using men for sex and disposing of them like tissues," while Adam R. Holz of Plugged In added that Rihanna "obscenely and explicitly brushes off a clingy guy by demeaning his prowess in bed." For Bianca Gracie of Idolator, Rihanna comes across as "a confident, self-empowered woman who can throw away immature men as quickly as she changes her lipstick."

== Critical reception ==
David Sackllah of Consequence of Sound considered it the best song on the album, calling it "the ultimate kiss-off to an ex" and "masterful." Idolator's Bianca Gracie praised the song for being an "addictive track [that] has all the potential to become every female's anthem." Considering an album highlight, Jon Caramanica of The New York Times explained that "Rihanna has always shined when at her most assertive," and praised her singing for being "reserved and cool." Safy-Hallan Farah and Eve Barlow, writers of Spin, were positive towards the song, with Farah considering it an obvious highlight and Barlow regarding it as an "upgraded 'Rated R'-era swag." Patrick Ryan of USA Today praised the song's lyrics and Rihanna's attitude, stating that "Needed Me is also a raw and refreshingly defiant confessional by Rihanna. This is the empowering pop star we've been missing." Alexis Petridis of The Guardian also praised its lyrics, labelling them "great". Troy L. Smith of Cleveland was positive, praising "the stellar production" and "Mustard's forceful synths [that] take center stage on a soaring hook."

Brittany Spanos of Rolling Stone enjoyed the song's flow, while also adding that it "sounds like our collective fantasy of Rihanna." Forrest Wickman of Slate stated that "Needed Me" was a departure from DJ Mustard's usual production style and compared it to the work of Drake on his 2013 album Nothing Was the Same. Jessica McKinney of Vibe declared that "It's for the #Navy members who need a beat to gets them up and moving as well as for the others that would rather not move at all, choosing instead to sit back with hands lifted and sing to the chorus or ad-libs." Amy Davidson of Digital Spy called it an "all about female empowerment, and if she sounds indifferent, it's because she's too busy not giving a damn about some "faded f**k" feeling jaded after being the latest guy she's cast aside." Emily Mackay of NME praised the song's trip hop groove, noting Rihanna's vocals as chilling continuing to praise the "chilly, mature Rihanna that speaks, not the nudge-nudge romper of ‘S&M’." Mackay also noted that "the warning of 'Don’t get it twisted' also echoes ‘Flawless’ from Beyoncé's self-titled 2013 album, already a hard comparison not to draw."

In a less favorable review, Jordan Bassett of NME called it an "airy, forgettable R&B that's not quite worthy of Rihanna." Neil McCormick of The Daily Telegraph thought it was "more atmosphere than actual song." Chris Gerard of PopMatters criticized her vocals for being "inexplicably slurred [...] dreary and tired," adding that the song was "third-rate at best compared with most of Rihanna's prior work." Sal Cinquemani of Slant Magazine found it to be "frustratingly familiar territory."

=== Accolades ===
Billboard ranked "Needed Me" at number 9 on their "100 Best Pop Songs of 2016" list: "We already knew that Rihanna was a savage -- her supreme self-confidence and total lack of f---s to give have made that abundantly clear over the years. But in case you missed the memo, "Needed Me" is the perfect reminder, pairing nihilistic razor-sharp lyrical barbs with a bass-heavy down-tempo beat that could almost be confused with a pained love song—but only if you weren't paying attention. The way she eviscerates a former lover ("Don't get it twisted / You was just another n---a on the hit list") is delivered so casually and with so much barely-concealed contempt that it can't even be called cocky; she's just stating the truth, and if you haven't caught on by now there's no hope left for catching up." Pitchfork would later list "Needed Me" on their ranking of the 100 best songs of 2016 at number 88. In the annual Village Voice's Pazz & Jop mass critics poll of the year's best in music in 2016, "Needed Me" was ranked at number 21, tied with Ariana Grande's "Into You" and Miranda Lambert's "Vice".

== Commercial performance ==
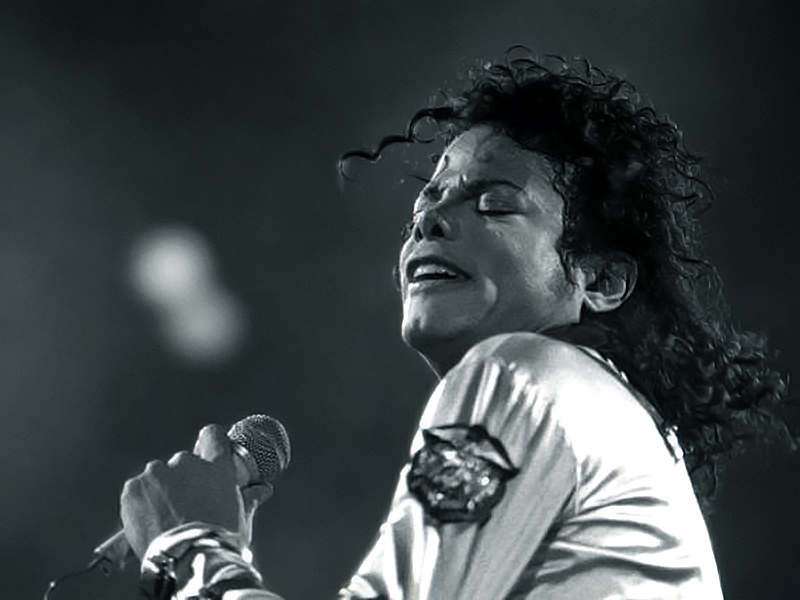
"Needed Me" became Rihanna's 29th Hot 100 top 10 hit, tying her with Michael Jackson for the third-most Hot 100 top-tens.

"Needed Me" debuted on the US Billboard Hot 100 chart at number 91, with 28,781 copies being shifted on the week of February 20, 2016. It kept on climbing the following weeks, until it reached the Top 40 on the week of April 30, 2016, becoming her forty-third Top 40 single, and making her the eleventh highest artist by number of Top 40 hits. During the week of May 21, 2016, "Needed Me" climbed from number 22 to number 13, and placing at number 5 on Streaming Songs. The following week, "Needed Me" rose to number 10 on the Billboard Hot 100, becoming Rihanna's twenty-ninth Top 10 hit, tying her with Michael Jackson for the third-most Top 10s, the two of them trailing behind Madonna and the Beatles. On June 18, the song rose to number 8, dropped to number 9 the next week before rising to its peak of number 7 in the Billboard issue dated July 2, 2016; ultimately, the song spent sixteen non-consecutive weeks in the Top 10 without reaching number 5, surpassing the record previously held by Kelly Clarkson's "Behind These Hazel Eyes", which spent fifteen weeks in the Top 10 while peaking at number 6. "Needed Me" became Rihanna's longest-charting hit on the Billboard Hot 100, spending forty-five weeks on the chart.

"Needed Me" climbed to number 2 on the Hot R&B/Hip-Hop Songs, after seven weeks at number 3. "Needed Me" spent eight consecutive weeks at number 2 before finally hitting the top spot on that chart during the week of September 24, 2016, becoming Rihanna's sixth leader on the chart. According to Nielsen's mid-year report in July 2016, "Needed Me" was the ninth most streamed song of the year, with a total of 146,364,000 audio streams. On August 20, 2016, "Needed Me" topped the Hot Dance Club Songs chart, becoming Rihanna's fourth chart topper of the year on that chart (after "Work", "This Is What You Came For", and "Kiss It Better") and her 27th overall. By the end of January 2021, "Needed Me" had accumulated over 1 billion streams and 1,212,000 downloads in the United States.

In the United Kingdom, the song debuted at number 90, following the song's video release, on the week of April 28, 2016. After spending ten weeks fluctuating on the charts, the song rose to number 38, becoming her forty-third Top 40 single. In France, "Needed Me" was Rihanna's lowest peak with a single, reaching number 94, before being released as a single. After being released, the song went as far as number 154 on the week of April 23, 2016. It spent six weeks and would be certified Diamond nine years later, becoming Rihanna's sixth official Diamond certification, after "Work", "Wild Thoughts", "Love On The Brain", "This Is What You Came For" and "Lift Me Up". In Australia, the song debuted at number 48, where it remained for two further weeks until it left the charts. It became her lowest charting single in the country, along with its parent single, "Kiss It Better". In New Zealand, "Needed Me" reached number 14 as its peak position, becoming her forty-first Top 20 single. In Germany, "Needed Me" became her lowest charting single, peaking at number 57.

== Music video ==
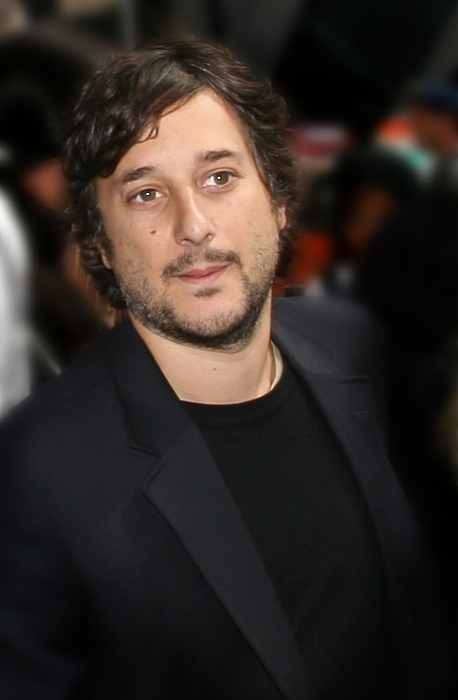
The music video was directed by filmmaker Harmony Korine.

In March 2016, media outlets reported that Rihanna was filming the music video for "Needed Me" during her Anti World Tour. The reports featured photos that saw Rihanna topless outdoors and images of Rihanna dressed in a backless bronze leather jumpsuit while riding on the back of a motorcycle. On April 20, 2016, Rihanna posted three video stills onto her official Instagram, and announced that the song's official music video would be released later that day in celebration of 420. The same Instagram stills revealed that the music video was directed by filmmaker Harmony Korine.

The video is set in a "gritty" area of Miami and features appearances from gun carrying and bike-riding characters. The video moves on to feature tattooed strippers in slow motion with low lit candle lighting. Rihanna, meanwhile, plays the action anti-hero, smoking and staring out into the distance from the patio of her luxurious pad, in a sheer cover-up. Later, she slowly makes her way through the grungy strip club with a pistol, setting her sights on one unlucky tattoo-heavy guy getting a lap dance—and kills him.

Aisha Harris of Slate stated that the accompanying video for "Needed Me" was inspired by Korine's film Spring Breakers, a sentiment also echoed by Jamieson Cox of The Verge, with Harris also noting that "it's difficult to tell if this video is trying to say anything particularly meaningful or is just an example of empty exploitation. Maybe it's a bit of both, but one thing is for sure: It's impossible to look away from." Adelle Platon of Billboard called it "a badass clip", while Brittany Spanos of Rolling Stone noted it to be reminiscent of her "Bitch Better Have My Money" video and named it "violent" and "dark". Patrick Ryan of USA Today placed the music video at number 1 on his list of "music videos that prove Rihanna is a 'Video Vanguard'". Speaking on the video Ryan stated that "Rihanna creates indelible characters in each of her videos", but praised the ones that came from the "ANTI era" which he described as being a " gun-toting, DGAF ice queen: half-naked, smoking a joint oceanside one minute, before sauntering into a strip club to mow you down the next. With Spring Breakers director Harmony Korine at the helm, Needed Me explores the hazy, sordid underbelly that this version of RiRi inhabits, with visuals so eye-poppingly WTF that you can’t look away from the carnage."

== Live performances ==
Rihanna included and performed "Needed Me" on the Anti World Tour. Josh Duboff of Vanity Fair praised the "Needed Me" performance, noting that it "came alive more in the live setting than [it] do[es] on the album, perhaps due to Rihanna's evident passion in selling [it]." On August 28, 2016, "Needed Me" was part of the third medley Rihanna performed at the 2016 MTV Video Music Awards, along with "Pour It Up" and "Bitch Better Have My Money".

== Track listing ==
Dance Remix EP
No.	Title	Length
1.	"Needed Me" (R3hab Remix)	3:19
2.	"Needed Me" (Salva Remix)	3:59
3.	"Needed Me" (W&W Remix)	3:25
4.	"Needed Me" (Attlas Remix)	4:23
5.	"Needed Me" (Cosmic Dawn Club Mix)	5:21

== Credits and personnel ==
Credits adapted from Rihanna's official website.

Locations

- Recorded at Westlake Beverly Recording Studios in Los Angeles, California
- Mixed at Larrabee Studios in Universal City, California
- Mastering at Sterling Sound Studios in New York City, New York

Personnel

- Rihanna – vocals, writing
- DJ Mustard – writing, production
- Twice As Nice – writing, co-production
- Frank Dukes – writing, co-production
- Brittany "Starrah" Hazzard – writing
- A. Sneed – writing
- Alicia Reneé – writing
- Charles Hinshaw – writing
- Derrus Rachel – writing
- Marcos Tovar – vocal recording
- Kuk Harrell – vocal recording, vocal production
- Blake Mares – additional recording
- Thomas Warren – additional recording
- Manny Marroquin – mixing
- Chris Galland – mixing assistant
- Ike Schultz – mixing assistant
- Chris Gehringer – mastering

== Charts ==
=== Weekly charts ===
Chart (2016–2017)	Peak position
Australia (ARIA)	44
Austria (Ö3 Austria Top 40)	71
Belgium (Ultratip Bubbling Under Flanders)	2
Belgium (Ultratop Flanders Urban)	13
Belgium (Ultratip Bubbling Under Wallonia)	11
Canada Hot 100 (Billboard)	25
Czech Republic Singles Digital (ČNS IFPI)	29
France (SNEP)	94
Germany (GfK)	57
Hungary (Single Top 40)	31
Hungary (Stream Top 40)	24
Ireland (IRMA)	47
Italy (FIMI)	46
Netherlands (Single Top 100)	42
New Zealand (Recorded Music NZ)	14
Portugal (AFP)	21
Slovakia Singles Digital (ČNS IFPI)	17
Spain (Promusicae)	79
Sweden (Sverigetopplistan)	34
Switzerland (Schweizer Hitparade)	45
UK Singles (Official Charts)	38
UK Hip Hop/R&B (Official Charts)	7
US Billboard Hot 100	7
US Dance Airplay (Billboard)	21
US Dance Club Songs (Billboard)	1
US Hot R&B/Hip-Hop Songs (Billboard)	1
US Pop Airplay (Billboard)	16
US Rhythmic Airplay (Billboard)	1

Chart (2023)	Peak position
Global 200 (Billboard)	113

=== Year-end charts ===
Chart (2016)	Position
Australia (ARIA)	96
Belgium (Ultratop Flanders Urban)	33
Canada (Canadian Hot 100)	38
Denmark (Tracklisten)	95
Italy (FIMI)	100
Netherlands (Single Top 100)	86
New Zealand (Recorded Music NZ)	39
Sweden (Sverigetopplistan)	99
Switzerland (Schweizer Hitparade)	90
UK Singles (Official Charts Company)	72
US Billboard Hot 100	13
US Hot Dance Club Songs (Billboard)	40
US Hot R&B/Hip-Hop Songs (Billboard)	4
US Rhythmic (Billboard)	2

=== Decade-end charts ===
Chart (2010–2019)	Position
US Hot R&B/Hip-Hop Songs (Billboard)	38

== Certifications ==
Region	Certification	Certified units/sales
Australia (ARIA)	7× Platinum	490,000^{‡}
Brazil (Pro-Música Brasil)	Diamond	250,000^{‡}
Canada (Music Canada)	7× Platinum	560,000^{‡}
Denmark (IFPI Danmark)	2× Platinum	180,000^{‡}
France (SNEP)	Diamond	333,333^{‡}
Germany (BVMI)	Gold	200,000^{‡}
Italy (FIMI)	Platinum	50,000^{‡}
New Zealand (RMNZ)	6× Platinum	180,000^{‡}
Poland (ZPAV)	2× Platinum	100,000^{‡}
Portugal (AFP)	2× Platinum	20,000^{‡}
Spain (Promusicae)	Platinum	60,000^{‡}
Sweden (GLF)	2× Platinum	80,000^{‡}
United Kingdom (BPI)	3× Platinum	1,800,000^{‡}
United States (RIAA)	12× Platinum	12,000,000^{‡}
Streaming
Greece (IFPI Greece)	Gold	1,000,000^{†}
Summaries
Worldwide	—	17,000,000
^{‡} Sales+streaming figures based on certification alone.^{†} Streaming-only figures based on certification alone.

== Release history ==
Region	Date	Format	Label	Ref.
United States	March 30, 2016	Urban radio	Roc Nation; Westbury Road	
United States	May 24, 2016	Contemporary hit radio	Def Jam	
Various	June 1, 2016	Streaming (Remixes)	Roc Nation; Westbury Road	

== See also ==
- List of Billboard Hot 100 top 10 singles in 2016
