= Naujour =

Studio album by Toosii
- Released: June 2, 2023
- Length: 53:03
- Label: South Coast; Capitol
- Producer: 2one2; ADELSO; A-Dre; Al Shux; Antar; APGoKrazy; Ascension; Bossman; Chambers; Diego Ave; Dson Beats; Fasbeats; GeoVocals; Harry Bhatia; Hitmaka; JLH; The LoopHoles; Lowrenz; Off & Out; ProdByDawson; ProdByDraka; Prod. Sammy; Quincy Riley; S. Dot; Tariq Beats; Tatiana Manaois; Turbo; Yici; Yozo; Yung Talent; ZS Beats

Toosii chronology
| Boys Don't Cry (2022) | Naujour (2023) | Jaded (2024) |

Singles from Naujour
- 1. "Love Is..." Released: July 15, 2022; 2. "Favorite Song" Released: February 17, 2023

Naujour is the second studio album by American rapper and singer Toosii. It was released through South Coast and Capitol on June 2, 2023. The album contains guest appearances from Khalid, Wallo267, 21 Savage, and Future. Production was handled by Adelso, Al Shux, Bossman, Hitmaka, and Turbo, alongside a handful of others. The release of the album was preceded by two singles: "Love Is...", and the top 10 Billboard Hot 100 hit, "Favorite Song". It serves as the follow-up to Toosii's previous EP, Boys Don't Cry (2022).

== Background and promotion ==
Toosii began to promote the release of the album in 2022 through social media as his fans demanded new music. On May 5, 2023, Toosii officially announced the release of the album. He announce the official tracklist on May 15, 2023.

== Singles ==
The lead single of the album, "Love Is...", was released on July 15, 2022. The second single, "Favorite Song" was released as a Valentine's Day special on February 17, 2023.

== Critical reception ==
Professional ratings
Review scores
| Source | Rating |
|---|---|
| AllMusic | 3/5 stars |

Naujour received mediocre reviews from cities. Timothy Monger from AllMusic noted that the album follows a pattern of "confessional, inward-looking songs with a strong melodic component" and that "the album doubles down on introspective material with songs that run the gamut from mellow romantic balladry."

== Track listing ==
Naujour track listing
| No. | Title | Writer(s) | Producer(s) | Length |
|---|---|---|---|---|
| 1. | "Rule Number 1" | Nau'Jour Grainger; Faris Alawneh; Harry Bhatia; Alex Smisek; Ashley Dawn Kutcher; Cooper James Holzman; Bethany Ann Warner | Bossman; Harry Bhatia; Yozo | 2:49 |
| 2. | "This Is Love" | Grainger; Bob Marley; Andrea Fossati; Smisek | A-Dre; Yozo | 3:14 |
| 3. | "Another Love Song" | Grainger; Alawneh; Fedor Sommerfeld; Georgia Rose Boyden | Bossman; Fasbeats; Geo Vocals | 2:51 |
| 4. | "FWLM" | Grainger; Christian Ward; Mikael Haataja; Samuel Haataja; Shaun Thomas; Ivory Scott | Hitmaka; Off & Out; S. Dot | 3:06 |
| 5. | "Rich Ridin" | Grainger; Nathan Chapman; Mohamed Antar; Sommerfeld; Lorenzo Merenda; Jenna Raine | Antar; Fasbeats; Lowrenz | 1:52 |
| 6. | "Villains & Heroes" | Grainger; Alawneh; James Lanty-Hickson; Smisek; Dustin Bird; Chrystal Leigh Oudijk; Christopher Hugh Buck | A-Dre; Bossman; JLH; Yozo | 3:08 |
| 7. | "Favorite Song (Remix)" (with Khalid) | Grainger; Khalid Robinson; Adelso Sicaju; Tatiana Manaois | ADELSO; Tatiana Manaois | 3:44 |
| 8. | "Sinking" | Grainger; Alawneh; Robert Smorra; Smisek | Bossman; Draka; Yozo | 1:58 |
| 9. | "Interlude" (featuring Wallo267) | Grainger; Wallace Peeples; Alexander Shuckburgh; Diego Avendano | Al Shux; Diego Ave | 1:36 |
| 10. | "Only Me" | Grainger; Chandler Great; Cameron Martin | Turbo; Yung Talent | 2:08 |
| 11. | "Take Care" | Grainger; James Icart; Jesse Gumer; Charlotte Elene Day Wilson; Jack Sheppard Rochon; Merna Bishouty; Sydney Loren Bennett; Altariq Crapps | 2one2; Quincy Riley; Tariq Beats | 2:54 |
| 12. | "Go Go Go" | Grainger; Joseph Chambers; Avendano | Chambers; Diego Ave | 1:48 |
| 13. | "Pull Up" (with 21 Savage) | Grainger; Shéyaa Abraham-Joseph; Javar Rockamore; Maurice Mitchell; Robert Reese; Theodore "Maddscientist" Thomas | The LoopHoles | 2:13 |
| 14. | "Woo Lady" | Grainger; Sicaju; Archie Patmore; Yanniek Small | ADELSO; APGoKrazy; Yici | 3:12 |
| 15. | "Love Is..." | Grainger; Alawneh; Dawson Odegard; Samuel Dua; Julia Michaels; John Henry Ryan; Billy Walsh; Stefan Adam Johnson; Jordan Kendall Johnson | Bossman; ProdByDawson; Prod. Sammy | 3:50 |
| 16. | "Favorite Song" | Grainger; Sicaju; Manaois | ADELSO; Tatiana Manaois | 3:24 |
| 17. | "Will Be King" | Grainger; John Cureton; Alawneh; Zakir Shahzad | Ascension; Bossman; ZS Beats | 2:55 |
| 18. | "God Loves Me" | Grainger; Jason Constantin | Dson Beats | 2:52 |
| 19. | "Favorite Song (Toxic Version)" (featuring Future) | Grainger; Nayvadius Cash; Sicaju; Manaois | ADELSO; Tatiana Manaois | 3:29 |
| Total length: | | | | 53:03 |

== Charts ==
Chart performance for Naujour
| Chart (2023) | Peak position |
|---|---|
| Canadian Albums (Billboard) | 88 |
| US Billboard 200 | 19 |
| US Top R&B/Hip-Hop Albums (Billboard) | 6 |

=== Year-end charts ===
Year-end chart performance for Naujour
| Chart (2023) | Position |
|---|---|
| US Top R&B/Hip-Hop Albums (Billboard) | 75 |

== Certifications ==
Certifications for Naujour
| Region | Certification | Certified units/sales |
|---|---|---|
| United States (RIAA) | Gold | 500,000^{‡} |
^{‡} Sales+streaming figures based on certification alone.
