= Toosii =

American rapper (born 2000)

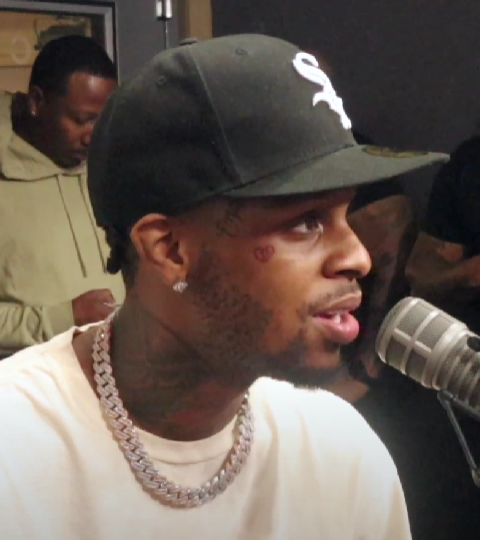
- Toosii in 2023

Background information
- Born: Nau'Jour Grainger; January 9, 2000 (age 26); Syracuse, New York, U.S.
- Origin: Raleigh, North Carolina, U.S.
- Genres: Contemporary R&B; pop rap; trap
- Occupations: Rapper; singer; actor; songwriter
- Years active: 2017–present
- Labels: South Coast Music Group; Capitol
- Website: toosii2x.com

Nau'Jour Lazier Grainger (born January 9, 2000), better known by his stage name Toosii, is an American rapper, singer, songwriter, and football player. Beginning his career in 2017, he rose to mainstream prominence following the release of his 2023 single "Favorite Song", which first gained virality on the social media platform TikTok. The song peaked at number 5 on the Billboard Hot 100, earned double platinum certification by the Recording Industry Association of America (RIAA), and preceded the release of his second studio album, Naujour (2023). The album peaked at number 19 on the Billboard 200, although his debut album, Poetic Pain (2020), reached number 17 on the chart.

== Early life ==
Nau'Jour Grainger was born and grew up in Syracuse, New York, but later relocated to Raleigh, North Carolina at the age of 13. It was in Raleigh where he began to seriously pursue his musical career. Rap was an escape route from his issues as a youth. He started recording music at age 16, while playing high school football and figuring out his life path.

== Career ==
=== 2017–2020: Career beginnings, Who Dat and Poetic Pain ===
Toosii's stage name derived from his childhood nickname of "Toota", and changed it to Toosii after his football teammates said it as a joke, adding the two I's because "You need two eyes to see the vision". Toosii was discovered by the South Coast Music Group. He signed with the record label in 2019. Toosii was inspired to try music by both his brother and father and spent a period of time homeless before his career began to further develop.

Toosii released several mixtapes during the roots of his career such as Label Me Diverse, Hell on Earth, and Why Not Now. He got his big break in 2019 with the release of the track "Red Lights", which went on to accrue millions of streams. He then released his Who Dat mixtape on April 30, 2019, which was followed by the six-track mixtape, My Shit Now on January 3, 2020, consisting solely of remixes of popular tracks. On February 7, 2020, he released the 13-track Platinum Heart mixtape. Platinum Heart reached number-one on the Billboard Heatseekers Albums chart upon its initial release. The mixtape was later reissued as a 20-track deluxe version. On September 18, 2020, his third South Coast Music Group-affiliated album Poetic Pain was released as his first project on Capitol Records. His signing to Capitol was made on September 30, by Chris Turner (A&R) following the release of his official video for "Love Cycle" with Summer Walker. Toosii was credited with 50,000 US adjusted sales and over 250 million combined global streams in 2020 at the time of this release. "Love Cycle" was later certified gold by the Recording Industry Association of America on January 11, 2021. His project Poetic Pain debuted at number 17 on the Billboard 200 chart in September 2020 and features the RIAA-certified gold single "Love Cycle" with Summer Walker.

=== 2021–2022: Thank You for Believing, Pretty Girls Love Toosii and Boys Don't Cry ===
Ahead of releasing his Thank You For Believing mixtape, Toosii was named "Up Now" by music streaming service Audiomack. “I feel like I am the GOAT,” Toosii said. “Thank you Audiomack for the opportunity to be your next #UpNow artist.”

On May 7, 2021, Toosii released his seventh mixtape, Thank You for Believing. The tape's title shows "gratitude to those that had faith in him and helped get him where he is today". It contains 13 tracks, and features Mulatto, Key Glock, and DaBaby. In 2021, he was featured on the XXL Freshman Class. On December 3, 2021, Toosii released a 3-track EP titled Pretty Girls Love Toosii which was assisted by a feature from Jacquees. Just under a year later, on October 7, 2022, Toosii released his fourth EP, Boys Don't Cry which featured his TikTok viral, "Love Is..." alongside "Heartaches" which also gained traction on social media. On November 11, 2022, Toosii released a deluxe to his EP titled, Boys Don't Cry: Men Do. Just a week later, he released a visual to the intro of the deluxe EP, "Frozen Below Zero".

=== 2023–2024: Naujour and Jaded ===
Beginning 2023, Toosii released his first single of the year, "Magic Potion" on January 27, 2023. Just weeks later, Toosii released his Valentine's Day special, "Favorite Song". The track marked Toosii's debut on the Billboard Hot 100 after debuting at #51. The track received remixes from Khalid and Future released on May 5 and May 19. The remixes assisted the song's commercial performance as the track peaked at #5 in the US during the week ending June 3, 2023. The track also peaked at #25 on the Billboard Global 200. The track was certified platinum just three months after its release and 2× platinum in August 2023. The hit track served as the lead single (alongside "Love Is...") for Toosii's sophomore, self-titled studio album, Naujour. The album peaked at #19 on the Billboard 200, marking Toosii's second highest-charting album.

Continuing off of his success, on November 3, 2023, Toosii released "Suffice", the lead single to his eighth mixtape, Jaded, which includes a guest appearance from the American pop rock band, LANY.

=== 2025–2026: Football career ===
In August 2025, he announced that he was pausing his music career to play college football. He accepted an offer to play football at Syracuse in December 2025. After a falling out with Syracuse coach Fran Brown, Grainger joined Louisiana State University's football team in March 2026. In June 2026, Louisiana State University football coach Lane Kiffin stated that Grainger had left the team after entering into a brand deal with a gambling company.

== Discography ==
=== Studio albums ===
List of studio albums, with select chart positions
Title	Album details	Peak chart positions				Certifications
Title	Album details	US	US R&B/HH	US Rap	CAN	Certifications
Poetic Pain	Released: September 17, 2020; Label: SCMG; Format: Digital download, streaming	17	12	12	—	
Naujour	Released: June 2, 2023; Label: SCMG, Capitol; Format: Digital download, streaming	19	6	5	88	RIAA: Gold
"—" denotes a recording that did not chart or was not released in that territory.

=== Mixtapes ===
List of mixtapes, with select chart positions
Title	Mixtape details	Peak chart positions		
Title	Mixtape details	US	US R&B/HH	US Rap
Label Me Diverse	Released: March 18, 2017; Label: Self-released; Format: Digital download, streaming	—	—	—
Hell on Earth	Released: July 23, 2017; Label: Self-released; Format: Digital download, streaming	—	—	—
Why Not Now	Released: December 16, 2017; Label: Self-released; Format: Digital download, streaming	—	—	—
Who Dat	Released: April 30, 2019; Label: SCMG; Format: Digital download, streaming	—	—	—
My Shit Now	Released: January 3, 2020; Label: Self-released; Format: Digital download, streaming	—	—	—
Platinum Heart	Released: February 6, 2020; Label: SCMG; Format: Digital download, streaming	196	—	—
Thank You for Believing	Released: May 7, 2021; Label: SCMG, Capitol; Format: Digital download, streaming	25	16	14
Jaded	Released: October 4, 2024; Label: SCMG, Capitol; Format: Digital download, streaming	50	—	—
"—" denotes a recording that did not chart or was not released in that territory.

=== Extended plays ===
List of extended plays, with select info
Title	EP details
Big Steppa	Released: December 22, 2020; Label: SCMG; Format: Digital download, streaming
Dickpressed	Released: December 29, 2020; Label: SCMG; Format: Digital download, streaming
Pretty Girls Love Toosii	Released: December 3, 2021; Label: SCMG, Capitol; Format: Digital download, streaming
Boys Don't Cry	Released: October 7, 2022; Label: SCMG, Capitol; Format: Digital download, streaming

=== Singles ===
List of singles, with select chart positions
Title	Year	Peak chart positions						Certifications	Album
Title	Year	US	US R&B/HH	US Rap	CAN	UK	WW	Certifications	Album
"Karma"	2018	—	—	—	—	—	—		Non-album singles
"Right Track"	2018	—	—	—	—	—	—		Non-album singles
"Red Lights"	2019	—	—	—	—	—	—		Platinum Heart
"5 Stars"	2020	—	—	—	—	—	—		Platinum Heart
"You're Mine Still"	2020	—	—	—	—	—	—		Non-album single
"Rip 2.0"	2020	—	—	—	—	—	—		My Shit Now
"Push Start"	2020	—	—	—	—	—	—		Non-album single
"Love Cycle" (solo or with Summer Walker)	2020	— (Note: "Love Cycle" did not enter the Billboard Hot 100, but peaked at number seven on the Bubbling Under Hot 100 Singles chart.)	44	—	—	—	—	RIAA: Platinum	Platinum Heart and Poetic Pain
"Poetic Pain"	2020	—	—	—	—	—	—	RIAA: Gold	Poetic Pain
"Met in LA"	2020	—	—	—	—	—	—		Dickpressed
"Pain & Problems"	2020	—	—	—	—	—	—		Non-album singles
"Dark Fights"	2020	—	—	—	—	—	—		Non-album singles
"Back Together"	2021	—	—	—	—	—	—		Thank You for Believing
"What It Cost"	2021	—	—	—	—	—	—		Thank You for Believing
"Heart Cold"	2021	—	—	—	—	—	—		Thank You for Believing
"Spin Music" (with Fivio Foreign)	2021	—	—	—	—	—	—		Thank You for Believing
"Keeper"	2022	—	—	—	—	—	—		Non-album single
"Love Is..."	2022	— (Note: "Love Is..." did not enter the Billboard Hot 100, but peaked at number 14 on the Bubbling Under Hot 100 Singles chart.)	33	—	—	—	—	RIAA: Gold	Boys Don't Cry and Naujour
"Lonely"	2022	—	—	—	—	—	—		Non-album single
"Heartaches"	2022	—	—	—	—	—	—		Boys Don't Cry
"Colorblind" (with Ahksxma)	2022	—	—	—	—	—	—		Non-album singles
"Fire in the Booth, Pt. 1" (with Charlie Sloth)	2022	—	—	—	—	—	—		Non-album singles
"Magic Potion"	2023	—	—	—	—	—	—		Non-album singles
"Favorite Song" (solo or with Khalid or Future) (Note: The original version, remix with Khalid and toxic remix with Future all appear on Naujour.)	2023	5	2	1	41	87	25	RIAA: 5× Platinum; BPI: Silver; MC: Platinum	Naujour
"Suffice"	2023	—	—	—	—	—	—		Non-album singles
"IDGAF"	2023	—	—	—	—	—	—		Non-album singles
"Where You Been"	2024	—	—	—	—	—	—		Non-album singles
"Fuk You Mean"	2024	—	—	—	—	—	—		Jaded
"Champs Elysées" (featuring Gunna)	2024	—	—	—	—	—	—		Jaded
"Please Don't Go" (with YoungBoy Never Broke Again)	2025	—	—	—	—	—	—		Non-album single
"—" denotes a recording that did not chart or was not released in that territory.

=== Other charted and certified songs ===
List of other charted and certified songs, with select chart positions and certifications
Title	Year	Peak chart positions		Certifications	Album
Title	Year	US Bub.	US R&B/HH	Certifications	Album
"Reminiscing"	2020	—	—	RIAA: Gold	Platinum Heart
"Sapiosexual"	2020	—	—	RIAA: Gold	Poetic Pain
"Pull Up" (featuring 21 Savage)	2023	17	49		Naujour
"—" denotes a recording that did not chart or was not released in that territory.

=== Guest appearances ===
List of non-single guest appearances, with other performing artists, showing year released and album name
Title	Year	Other artists	Album
"Hero"	2020	Neno Calvin, Lil Poppa	Magnolia Manson
"Flight to China	2020	Wiz Khalifa	Road to Fast 9
"Last Time"	2020	JxHines	Love Stories
"One Time"	2020	Queen Naija	Missunderstood
"Traumatized"	2020	Phora	With Love 2
"Bidness"	2020	DaBaby	My Brother's Keeper (Long Live G)
"Chicken"	2020	Aminé	Limbo (Deluxe)
"Murda"	2020	Stunna 4 Vegas, Murda Beatz	Welcome To 4 Vegas
"All of Your Love"	2020	Hotboii	Double O Baby
"Interact"	2020	Smoove'L	Ice Cups and Shootouts
"Beneficial"	2020	Popp Hunna	Mud Baby
"Feel Better"	2021	BRS Kash	Kash Only
"No Love Too"	2021	100k Track, YNW Melly, FCG Heem, DKE AUTHOR	Mercury
"WYTD"	2021	Tokyo Jetz	Cancel Culture
"Gone Too Soon"	2021	Nuski2Squad	Lil Nuski
"Love Hurts"	2021	Lil Tjay	Destined 2 Win
"A.M. Flights"	2021	Lil Poppa	Blessed, I Guess
"More Pain"	2021	FCG Heem	Neighborhood Poetry
"Finally Made It"	2021	YBT	Tryna Win
"2 Pills"	2021	Rico Cartel	Legendary Nightz
"Soul Fly"	2021	Dee Gomes	Undrafted
"Rich Today"	2021	CFL Billions	LONG LIVE BOOGIE
"One Time"	2022	Luh Dino	Prayer Heals Pain The Aftermath
"Dead Roses"	2022	Yungeen Ace	All On Me
"Take Care"	2022	Lil Gotit, Millie Go Lightly	The Cheater
"Starfall"	2022	DaeDalTm	Prouda Myself
"W Hotel"	2024	Pressa	Non-album single
