= Hate Our Love =

2022 single by Queen Naija and Big Sean

Single by Queen Naija and Big Sean
- Released: February 4, 2022
- Genre: R&B
- Length: 3:46
- Label: Capitol
- Songwriters: Queen Bulls; Douglas Gibbs; Keith White; Michael Woods; Patrick McManus; Ralph Johnson; Sean Anderson
- Producer: Michael Woods

Queen Naija singles chronology
"Pieces" (2021)	"Hate Our Love" (2022)

Big Sean singles chronology
"What a Life" (2021)	"Hate Our Love" (2022)	"Easy Lover" (2022)

"Hate Our Love" is a song by American singer Queen Naija and American rapper and fellow Michigan recording artist Big Sean. It was released by Capitol Records on February 4, 2022 as the lead single from Queen's second studio album, which remains unreleased.

== Background ==
On January 22, 2022, the song was announced on Queen's Instagram account along with the link to pre-save the single. On January 28, Queen revealed that the other recording artist on the song was American rapper Big Sean and that February 4 was the song's release date.

== Charts ==
Chart performance for "Hate Our Love"
Chart (2022)	Peak position
New Zealand Hot Singles (RMNZ)	25
US Billboard Hot 100	88
US Hot R&B/Hip-Hop Songs (Billboard)	31
US Rhythmic Airplay (Billboard)	19

2022 year-end chart performance for "Hate Our Love"
Chart (2022)	Position
US Hot R&B/Hip-Hop Songs (Billboard)	61

== Release history ==
Release history and formats for "Hate Our Love"
Region	Date	Format(s)	Label(s)	Ref.
Various	February 4, 2022	Digital download; streaming	Capitol	
