= Missunderstood (Queen Naija album) =

Studio album by Queen Naija
- Released: October 30, 2020
- Genre: R&B
- Length: 49:47
- Label: Capitol
- Producers: Queen Naija; Alex Niceforo; AVB; Ayo the Producer; B100; Boi-1da; Boston; Chrishan; Daniel Bryant; Daoud; D. Brooks Exclusive; DZL; El Jefe; Harmony Samuels; Hitmaka; Jahaan Sweet; Jeff “Gitty” Gitelman; JetsonMade; JV; Keith Sorrells; Lil' Ronnie; Luca Mauti; Mike Woods; Mr. Hanky; Oak; Pat McManus; Pooh Beatz; Rob Grimaldi; Squat Beats; Tiffany Johnson; T-Minus; Troy Taylor; Westen Weiss; Xeryus

Queen Naija chronology
Queen Naija (2018)	Missunderstood (2020)	After the Butterflies (2023)

Singles from Missunderstood
- 1. "Butterflies Pt. 2" Released: March 13, 2020; 2. "Pack Lite" Released: July 24, 2020; 3. "Lie to Me" Released: October 2, 2020; 4. "Love Language" Released: October 16, 2020; 5. "Bitter" Released: October 27, 2020; 6. "Set Him Up" Released: April 8, 2021

Missunderstood (stylized in all lowercase) is the debut studio album by American singer Queen Naija. The album was released on October 30, 2020, through Capitol. The production on the album was handled by multiple producers including Boi-1da, T-Minus, Jahaan Sweet, Hitmaka, Lil' Ronnie and Pooh Beatz among others. The album also features guest appearances by Lil Durk, Russ, Toosii, Jacquees, Latto, and Kiana Ledé. The deluxe version features guest appearances by Ari Lennox, Wale and J.I the Prince of N.Y.

Missunderstood was supported by six singles: "Butterflies Pt. 2", "Pack Lite", "Lie to Me", "Love Language", "Bitter", and "Set Him Up". The album received generally positive reviews from music critics and was a moderate commercial success. It debuted at number nine on the US Billboard 200 and number one on the US Top R&B Albums charts, earning 34,000 album-equivalent units in its first week. A deluxe edition titled Missunderstood...Still was released on April 16, 2021, including six new tracks and a remix of Butterflies Pt. 2 featuring Wale.

== Critical reception ==
Professional ratings
Review scores
Source	Rating
AllMusic	4/5 stars

Andy Kellman of AllMusic praised Queen Naija's artistic development. Kellman said "While Queen Naija has excelled with singles, the longer format allows her diaristic songwriting to truly flourish, and there's more poise and nuance in her lithe vocals without sacrificing the power of her rawest expressions." He also praised her work saying that "Queen Naija could have rushed her debut album. Instead, she took her time with Missunderstood, and it shows." Ultimately, Kellman gave the album a rating of 4 stars out of 5.

== Commercial performance ==
Missunderstood debuted at number one on the US Top R&B Albums chart, earning 34,000 album-equivalent units in its first week, according to MRC Data. This became Queen Naija's first number one album on the chart. The album also debuted at number nine on the US Billboard 200 and number six on the US Top R&B/Hip-Hop Albums charts respectively. This became Queen Naija's first US top-ten debut on both charts. In addition, the album also accumulated a total of 33.87 million on-demand streams of the set's songs. On October 31, 2023, the album was certified gold by the Recording Industry Association of America (RIAA) for combined sales and album-equivalent units of over 500,000 units in the United States.

Five songs from Missunderstood charted on the US Hot R&B Songs chart, with "Lie to Me" at number 10, "Butterflies Pt. 2" at number 12, "Pack Lite" at number 14, "Bitter" at number 18 and "Too Much to Say" at number 25.

== Track listing ==
Missunderstood track listing
No.	Title	Writer(s)	Producer(s)	Length
1.	"Intro"	Queen Naija	Queen Naija	0:49
2.	"Too Much to Say"	Naija; Ronald Jackson; Daniel Bryant	Lil' Ronnie; Daniel Bryant	2:33
3.	"I'm Her" (featuring Kiana Ledé)	Naija; Tiffany Johnson; Leonard Brooks; Kiana Brown; Harmony Samuels; Edgar "Johnny Velvet" Etienne; Charlton Ridgell Jr; Brittany Barber	Harmony Samuels; JV	3:18
4.	"Pack Lite"	Naija; Brian Bailey; Craig A. Longmiles; Andre Young; Ricardo Brown; Nathaniel Hale; Isaac Hayes; Sincere James; Keith Sorrells; Alex Niceforo; Warren "Oak" Felder	Alex Niceforo; Keith Sorrells; Oak	2:56
5.	"Lie to Me" (featuring Lil Durk)	Naija; Felder; Sorrells; Jaucquez Lowe; Bunny DeBarge; Durk Banks; Niceforo	Niceforo; Oak; Sorrells	3:12
6.	"Dream" (featuring Lucky Daye)	Naija; Mike Holmes; Luca Mauti; Dustin "Dab" Bowie; David Brown	Luca Mauti; DZL	3:01
7.	"Love Language"	Naija; Michael Woods II; Michael McCall	Mike Woods; Boston	2:53
8.	"Without You" (featuring Russ)	Naija; Daoud Anthony; Kuriosty Larkin holmes; Westen Weiss; Russell Vitale	Daoud Anthony; Weston Weiss; DZL	2:37
9.	"Say What You Mean"	Naija; Mauti; Holmes	Mauti; DZL	3:06
10.	"Bitter Skit" (featuring Pretty Vee)	Naija		0:20
11.	"Bitter" (featuring Latto)	Naija; Wadell Brooks; Ivory Scott IV; Alyssa Stephens	D. Brooks Exclusive	3:04
12.	"One Time" (featuring Toosii)	Naija; Rahky; Christopher Dotson; Khristopher Riddick-Tynes; Matthew Samuels; Jahaan Sweet; Christian Ward; Nau'Jour Grainger; Leon Thomas III	Jahaan Sweet; Boi-1da; Hitmaka	3:17
13.	"Pressure"	Naija; Edgar Machuca; Kevin White; Pat McManus; Mike Mosley; Woods; Howard Beverly; Tupac Shakur	Boston; Pat McManus; Woods	3:03
14.	"Five Seconds" (featuring Jacquees)	Naija; Tahj Morgan; Rodriquez Broadnax; Holmes	JetsonMade; DZL	2:56
15.	"Pretend"	Naija; Jackson; Robert Grimaldi; Jefferson Jean	Robert Grimaldi; Lil' Ronnie; El Jefe	3:23
16.	"Trial and Error"	Naija; KuriostyTyler Williams	T-Minus; Pooh Beatz	2:38
17.	"Butterflies Pt. 2"	Naija; Grimaldi; McManus; Nicholaus Williams; McCall; Marc Anthony Soto; Kaleb Rollins; Jean	Woods; Boston; McManus	2:30
18.	"Beautiful"	Naija; Samuels; Etienne; Jeff “Gitty” Gitelman; Brooks	Etienne; Johnson; Jeff “Gitty” Gitelman; Samuels	4:10
Total length:				49:47

Deluxe edition (bonus tracks)
No.	Title	Writer(s)	Producer(s)	Length
19.	"Supa Vibe"	Naija; AVB; Dotson; Ward; Racquelle “Rahky” Anteola; Ridgell Jr.; Austin Owens	AVB; Hitmaka; Chrishan; Ayo the Producer	2:18
20.	"Set Him Up" (with Ari Lennox)	Naija; Lianna Banks; Kevin White; McCall; Courtney Salter	McManus; Boston; Woods	3:42
21.	"Love Is..." (featuring J.I the Prince of N.Y)	Naija; Felder; Lowe; Eve Jeffers; Justin Rivera; Kasseem Dean; Shari Watson; Woods; Corey Dennard	Oak; Mr. Hanky; Woods	3:55
22.	"Empty (interlude)"	Naija; Julius Rivera; Charles Hinshaw, Jr.	B100; Squat Beats	2:10
23.	"Insecure"	Naija; Lowe; Troy Taylor	Naija; Troy Taylor	3:22
24.	"Passionate"	Naija; Taylor; Daniel Breland; Xeryus Gittens	Naija; Taylor	3:51
25.	"Butterflies Pt. 2" (with Wale)	Naija; Grimaldi; McManus; Williams; McCall; Soto; Rollins; Jean; Olubowale Akintimehin	Woods; Boston; McManus	2:42
Total length:				72:00

Sample credits

- “Pack Lite” samples “Xxplosive” by Dr. Dre & interpolates “Bag Lady” by Erykah Badu.
- “Lie to Me” samples “A Dream” by DeBarge & interpolates “This Luv” by Donell Jones.
- “Pressure” interpolates “Can U Get Away” by Tupac Shakur.

== Charts ==
Chart (2020)	Peak position
US Billboard 200	9
US Top R&B/Hip-Hop Albums (Billboard)	6
US Top R&B Albums (Billboard)	1

== Certifications ==
Region	Certification	Certified units/sales
United States (RIAA)	Gold	500,000^{‡}
^{‡} Sales+streaming figures based on certification alone.
