= Queen Naija =

American singer (born 1995)

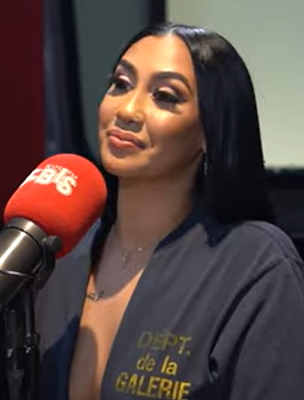
- Queen Naija in 2022

Background information
- Born: Queen Naija Bulls; October 17, 1995 (age 31); Ypsilanti, Michigan, U.S.
- Genre: R&B
- Occupations: Singer; media personality
- Years active: 2014–present
- Label: Capitol
- Children: 2
- Website: iamqueennaija.com

Queen Naija Bulls (/ˈnɑːdʒə/; born October 17, 1995) is an American R&B singer and media personality. Born and raised in Ypsilanti, Michigan, Bulls began her career as a YouTube vlogger, and appeared on the thirteenth season of American Idol. Her 2017 single, "Medicine" peaked within the top 50 of the Billboard Hot 100; the following year, she signed with Capitol Records. The song and its 2018 follow-ups, "Karma" and "Butterflies" each received double platinum certifications by the Recording Industry Association of America (RIAA) and preceded the release of her self-titled debut extended play (2018), which peaked at number 26 on the Billboard 200. Bulls' debut studio album, Missunderstood (2020) peaked at number nine on the chart.

== Early life ==
Queen Naija was born on October 17, 1995, in Ypsilanti, Michigan. She has described her background as a mix of "Arab, African and European", but has also mentioned having Indian (Note: Due to the ambiguity of the word "Indian" in English, this could mean "Indian" in reference to having partial Native American ancestry, or "Indian" meaning she has ancestry from the Indian subcontinent.) ancestry, though she was not sure how much. Her father was from Yemen.

Her birth name, Queen Naija, was given to her by her mother. "Queen" was inspired by her grandmother, who had the same first name, and "Naija" represented her father's name.

== Career ==
=== 2014–2017: American Idol and YouTube ===
Queen Naija first gained prominence as a contestant on the thirteenth season of American Idol. She had auditioned two years earlier but had failed to advance into the next round. In the thirteenth season, she advanced into the Hollywood round, but was cut when the top 30 were chosen. Afterwards, Queen Naija went back to working as a security guard. She then continued on building her YouTube career.

=== 2017–2019: Musical career beginnings and Queen Naija EP ===
Queen Naija released her song "Medicine" in March 2018 and "Karma", her second single, in July 2018.

Queen Naija did a video interview for the song "Medicine" with Genius in January 2018. Queen documented on her YouTube channel a few meetings with record labels that she attended with her team/management. By March 2018, Queen's initial song post of "Medicine" had more than 10 million views. An official music video was released later that month. The video acquired 4.5 million views on the day of its release, and has over 248 million views as of February 2025. In July 2018, Queen Naija created a new collaborative YouTube channel, "Royal Family", alongside her new boyfriend, Clarence White. The channel has 2.79 million subscribers as of March 2021.

On April 25, 2018, Queen Naija signed to Capitol Records. On June 28, she released her second single, "Karma". She wrote and recorded the song in January 2018. On the same day, the song reached number one overall on the iTunes charts. "Karma" debuted at number 13 on the Billboard Digital Songs sales chart, and at number 63 on the Billboard Hot 100. The audio for the song has over 116 million views as of March 2021.

Queen Naija released her self-titled extended play on July 27, 2018. It consists of five songs: "Medicine", "Karma", "Mama's Hand", "Butterflies", and "Bad Boy". The project includes production from No I.D., El Jefe, Rob Grimaldi, 30 Hertz Beats, and ClickNPress. Queen described the EP as an emotional journey in which each song describes either an experience or emotion she has gone through. The songs reference topics including heartbreak and betrayal, motherhood, and finding new love again. "Medicine" deals with her heartbreak and emotions toward her ex-partner, and "Karma" explains overcoming the heartbreak while sending a message that she will be fine. "Mama's Hand" is dedicated to her son; she promises to give him everything and encourages him to have optimistic thoughts about the future. "Butterflies" reveals that she is beginning to fall in love again with someone new. "Bad Boy" describes her connection with a new lover, and how her goodness may cause him to change for the better. The EP debuted at number 26 on the Billboard 200 and reached number one on the Apple Music R&B charts.

=== 2020–present: Missunderstood ===
On July 24, 2020, Queen Naija released "Pack Lite", the first single for her debut album. A video for the song was released on July 31. Queen released the single "Lie to Me" featuring Lil Durk on October 2. On October 5, Queen released a visual for the song. The song samples DeBarge's "A Dream". On October 30, Queen Naija released her debut album, Missunderstood. The album is 18 tracks long and features artists such as Jacquees, Toosii, Mulatto, Pretty Vee, Russ, Lucky Daye, Kiana Ledé, and more. Three singles from the album were Certified Gold by the RIAA. The deluxe edition of the album titled Missunderstood...Still featuring J.I the Prince of N.Y and Ari Lennox was released on April 16, 2021. On October 28, 2021, Missunderstood was nominated at the 2021 American Music Awards. On October 17, 2021, on Queen's 26th birthday, she started the mini Butterfly Tour, her second tour, across 19 US cities, with special guest Tink.

She released her 30 EP in October 2025, with features from Cash Cobain and Mariah the Scientist.

In July 2026, Queen Naija enrolled as a student in the second installment of Kai Cenat's Streamer University creator bootcamp. Attending alongside her partner, Clarence White, the multi-day event marked her active expansion from music into the live-streaming space. While on campus, Queen Naija generated significant online traction following a highly discussed on-stream confrontation regarding Clarence's visit to the dorm room of fellow students DreamDoll and Jordyn Lucas.

== Personal life ==
Bulls began dating Clarence White in 2018. The couple had a son in 2019. They became engaged in April 2026. On October 5, 2026, Bulls announced that she is pregnant with their third child.

== Discography ==
=== Studio albums ===
List of studio albums, with selected details and chart positions
Title	Album details	Peak chart positions			Certifications
Title	Album details	US	US R&B /HH	US R&B	Certifications
Missunderstood	Released: October 30, 2020; Label: Capitol; Format: CD, digital download, streaming	9	6	1	RIAA: Gold

=== Mixtapes ===
List of studio albums, with selected details and chart positions
Title	Album details
After the Butterflies	Released: November 17, 2023; Label: Capitol; Format: Digital download, streaming
30.	Released: October 24, 2025; Label: Capitol; Format: Digital download, streaming

=== Extended plays ===
List of extended plays, with selected details and chart positions
Title	Album details	Peak chart positions			Certifications
Title	Album details	US	US R&B /HH	US R&B	Certifications
Queen Naija	Released: July 27, 2018; Label: Capitol; Format: Digital download	26	14	2	RIAA: Gold

=== Singles ===
List of singles as lead artist, with selected details and chart positions
Title	Year	Peak chart positions				Certifications	Album
Title	Year	US	US Adult R&B	US R&B /HH	US R&B	Certifications	Album
"Medicine"	2017	45	1	20	3	RIAA: 2× Platinum	Queen Naija
"Karma"	2018	63	1	40	7	RIAA: 2× Platinum	Queen Naija
"Butterflies"	2018	—	—	49	14	RIAA: 2× Platinum	Queen Naija
"War Cry"	2018	—	—	—	—		Non-album singles
"Away from You"	2019	—	—	—	—		Non-album singles
"Good Morning Text"	2019	—	—	—	—		Non-album singles
"Butterflies Pt.2"	2020	—	1	—	10	RIAA: Gold	Missunderstood
"Pack Lite"	2020	—	11	—	11	RIAA: Platinum	Missunderstood
"Lie to Me" (featuring Lil Durk)	2020	—	—	—	10	RIAA: Platinum	Missunderstood
"Love Language"	2020	—	—	—	—		Missunderstood
"Bitter" (featuring Latto)	2020	—	—	—	18		Missunderstood
"Set Him Up" (featuring Ari Lennox)	2021	—	—	—	14		Missunderstood...Still
"Hate Our Love" (with Big Sean)	2022	88	1	31	5	RIAA: Gold	Non-album single
"No Fake Love (featuring YoungBoy Never Broke Again)	2023	—	—	—	12		After the Butterflies
"rain..."	2025	—	—	—	—		30.

=== As featured artist ===
List of singles as a featured artist, with selected chart positions, showing year released and album name
Title	Peak chart positions	Year	Album
Title	US R&B	Year	Album
"Pieces" (YNW Melly featuring Queen Naija)	—	2021	Just a Matter of Slime
"Bed Friend" (Jacquees featuring Queen Naija)	25	2021	Non-album single

== Awards and nominations ==
Awards	Year	Nominee	Category	Result	Ref.
Billboard Music Awards	2019	Herself	Top R&B Female Artist	Nominated	
American Music Awards	2021	Missunderstood	Favorite R&B Album	Nominated	
BET Awards	2019	Herself	Best New Artist	Nominated	
BET Awards	2019	"Mama's Hand"	BET Her Award	Nominated	
IHeartRadio Music Awards	2019	Herself	Best New R&B Artist	Nominated	
IHeartRadio Music Awards	2019	Herself	Social Star Award	Nominated	
Soul Train Music Awards	2018	Herself	Best New Artist	Nominated	
Soul Train Music Awards	2022	"Hate Our Love"	Best Collaboration	Nominated	
