= Set Me Free (Mary J. Blige song) =

Single by Mary J. Blige

from the album Strength of a Woman
- Released: July 19, 2017
- Length: 3:29
- Label: Capitol; Matriarch
- Songwriters: Mary J. Blige; Jazmine Sullivan; Darhyl Camper, Jr.; Charles Hinshaw
- Producer: DJ Camper

Mary J. Blige singles chronology
"Love Yourself" (2017)	"Set Me Free" (2017)	"Only Love" (2018)

"Set Me Free" is a song recorded by American singer Mary J. Blige. It was written by Blige, Jazmine Sullivan, Darhyl "DJ" Camper, Jr., and Charles Hinshaw for her thirteenth studio album, Strength of a Woman (2017), while production was helmed by Camper. The song was released as the album's fourth single on July 19, 2017, and peaked at number eight on the US Adult R&B Songs.

== Critical reception ==
The reception to the song has been generally positive, with Entertainment Weekly calling it a "fiery kissoff." The Guardian called the song "pleasingly understated" with "D'Angelo vibes," while The New York Times wrote that Blige sounds "ecstatic and free."

== Commercial reception ==
"Set Me Free" became Blige's 22nd top-ten hit on the Billboard Adult R&B Songs chart, tying the record for most top-10 hits on that chart. It also became her third top-ten hit on that chart from the Strength of a Woman album.

== Charts ==
=== Weekly charts ===
Chart (2017)	Peak position
US Adult R&B Songs (Billboard)	8
US R&B/Hip-Hop Airplay (Billboard)	31

=== Year-end charts ===
Chart (2017)	Position
US Adult R&B Songs (Billboard)	28

== Release history ==
Country	Date	Format	Label	Ref.
United States	July 19, 2017	Digital download	Capitol Records	
