= Strength of a Woman (album) =

Studio album by Mary J. Blige
- Released: April 28, 2017
- Studio: Marvin's Room (Hollywood); Henson (Los Angeles); Chalice (Los Angeles)
- Genre: R&B
- Length: 57:42
- Label: Capitol
- Producer: BadBadNotGood; Bigg D; DJ Camper; Hit-Boy; Brandon "B.A.M." Hodge; Kaytranada; Lamb; Neff-U; Teddy Riley; William Tyler

Mary J. Blige chronology
The London Sessions (2014)	Strength of a Woman (2017)	Good Morning Gorgeous (2022)

Singles from Strength of a Woman
- 1. "Thick of It" Released: October 7, 2016; 2. "U + Me (Love Lesson)" Released: February 17, 2017; 3. "Love Yourself" Released: March 30, 2017; 4. "Set Me Free" Released: July 19, 2017

Strength of a Woman is the thirteenth studio album by American R&B singer-songwriter Mary J. Blige. It was released on April 28, 2017, by Capitol Records. A pre-divorce album with heavy adult contemporary trap sounds, Blige co-wrote most of the album with American musicians Brandon "B.A.M" Hodge and DJ Camper, while additional production was provided by BadBadNotGood, Bigg D, Hit-Boy, Kaytranada, Lamb, and Neff-U. Strength of a Woman's subject matter was inspired by her personal journey of marital struggle and heartache which culminated in her separation from and divorce from her manager Kendu Isaacs in 2016 and 2018 respectively.

The album was released to positive reception from music critics, who complimented its current but faintly retro production and Blige's emotionally transparent songwriting. Commercially, it became her first top three album on the US Billboard 200 since Stronger with Each Tear (2009) with opening sales of 78,000 album-equivalent units. Internationally, it peaked at number three on the UK R&B Albums chart and reached number 22 in Canada. Earning Blige a number of accolades and nominations, Strength of a Woman won the singer the BET Her Award at the BET Awards 2018.

Strength of a Woman produced four singles, including "Thick of It" and "U + Me (Love Lesson), both of which peaked atop the US Adult R&B Songs chart, with the former spending a record-breaking 16 consecutive weeks at number-one. Two further singles, "Love Yourself" and "Set Me Free," were released in March and July 2017. In support of the album, Blige embarked on the Strength of a Woman Tour from April 2, 2017 to September 9, 2017. In 2022, she named the inaugural Strength of a Woman Festival and Summit, a three-day festival in Atlanta, in partnership with Live Nation Urban after the album.

== Background ==
In 2014, Blige moved to London for a while and produced her twelfth studio album The London Sessions (2014). Conceived during a time when she was questioning whether she even wanted to make music any more, her largely European team of collaborators, including singer Sam Smith and electronic music duo Disclosure, helped her re-boosting her lacking self-esteem. Released to Blige's strongest reviews in years, The London Sessions became her lowest-selling album yet. Inspired to branch more seriously into acting, she subsequently moved to Los Angeles, where she signed on to co-star opposite actress Carey Mulligan in director Dee Rees's historical drama Mudbound (2017) and began work on her next studio album for she reached out to producers Brandon Hodge and DJ Camper.

Meanwhile, Blige's personal life experienced an extended downturn. After being married for 13 years, she filed for divorce from her husband and manager of twelve years, Kendu Isaacs, in the summer of 2016, citing irreconcilable differences. While the separation resulted in a "nasty court battle" between her and Isaacs, the events leading up to it largely inspired the material that Blige had penned for the album. Pulling away from a divorce album, Strength of a Woman chronicles what the singer went through while she was trying to salvage her marriage. In a 2017 interview with Extra, Blige commented: "The title Strength of a Woman came from actually me understanding my strength as a woman, not from this divorce. The divorce came later. Which is when the divorce happened. But I was writing this album earlier from the perspective of a woman fighting really, really hard for her marriage."

== Singles ==
Capitol Records released several singles in promotion of Strength of a Woman, including promotional singles "Glow Up" and the album's title track. Lead single "Thick of It" was released by Capitol Records on October 7, 2016. Sampling from "Give a Little Love" by Scottish pop rock band Bay City Rollers, the song topped the US Adult R&B Songs chart for a record-breaking 16 consecutive weeks, surpassing Blige's previous best with "Be Without You," which had spent 14 weeks at number one in 2006. Vaulting to the top spot in only four weeks, it marked the chart's quickest run to number one since Whitney Houston's "Exhale (Shoop Shoop)" (1995) as well as Blige's fifth chart topper. It also reached number 47 on US Hot R&B/Hip-Hop Songs chart and was ranked seventh on Billboard's 2017 Adult R&B Songs year-end chart.

Follow-up "U + Me (Love Lesson)," a midtempo soul ballad about a breakup, was issued on February 17, 2017. The song became Blige's sixth chart-topper at the US Adult R&B Songs chart when it reached the summit on the May 6 chart issue. Billboard ranked it eighth on its 2017 Adult R&B Songs year-end chart. Third single "Love Yourself" featuring rapper ASAP Rocky was released on March 30, 2017. The song contains samples from "Nobody Knows" (1970) by The SCLC Operation Breadbasket Orchestra And Choir. The album version of the song which features Kanye West, peaked at number 11 on the US Adult R&B Songs chart. Fourth and final single "Set Me Free" was released on July 19, 2017. It became Blige's 22nd top-ten hit on the US Adult R&B Songs chart, peaking at number eight, while tying the record for most top-10 hits on that chart.

== Critical reception ==
Professional ratings
Aggregate scores
Source	Rating
Metacritic	74/100
Review scores
Source	Rating
AllMusic	3.5/5 stars
Clash	7/10
Exclaim!	8/10
The Guardian	3/5 stars
HipHopDX	3.7/5
The Independent	3/5 stars
Pitchfork	7.7/10

Strength of a Woman received generally positive reviews from music critics. On Metacritic, which assigns a normalized rating out of 100 to reviews from critics, the album received an average score of 74, based on seven reviews. Jon Caramanica of The New York Times gave the album a positive review, stating that, "the album moves like a forest fire: ruthless, wide-ranging, and blunt." Matt Bauer of Exclaim! praised the lyrics, and called it Blige's best work in over a decade, but criticizing songs such as "Glow Up", and "Smile". In a positive review, Julianne Shepherd of Pitchfork considered the album a relief from Blige's previous album, The London Sessions, along with Blige sticking to what makes her unique. Chuck Arnold from Entertainment Weekly felt that the album was "missing a killer cut or two; the empowering title track is the closest thing to a classic MJB anthem [...] The tone is more muted and melancholy than you might expect from a scorned Blige."

In a positive review, Andy Kellman of AllMusic gave the album 3.5 stars, calling some of the songs clichéd, however, praising the anthems on the album. Alluding to theme of the album, Kylie Eustice from HipHopDX wrote: "Pain is practically synonymous with art, so it’s not surprising Blige has delivered another round of raw, gritty and emotionally transparent songwriting." Clash editor Ammar Kalia felt that "running at 16 full-length tracks, Strength of a Woman can seem overindulgent. Songs that are enjoyable in isolation, or as a smaller subset, become either repetitive or forgettable in the context of the whole." Kate Hutchinson of The Guardian gave a mixed review of the album, criticizing the song "Glow Up", calling it too similar to other artists such as Rihanna, and Beyoncé. Despite these complaints, she praised the anthems included on the album. In another mixed review, Andy Gill of The Independent found the album using a generic R&B theme, however, stating that some songs included on the album are able to do it well, such as "Set Me Free".

== Commercial performance ==
Strength of a Woman debuted at number three on the US Billboard 200 on the issue dated ending May 20, 2017, with 78,000 album-equivalent units, (including 72,000 standard copies) in its first week. It became Blige's highest-charting album since 2009's Stronger with Each Tear, her tenth top five entry, and thirteenth top ten album on the chart. The album marked a significant spike of sales for the singer, whose previous release The London Sessions (2014) had opened at number nine, with first week sales of 55,000 copies. Strength of a Woman also debuted at number two on the US Top R&B/Hip-Hop Albums chart and number one on the Top R&B Albums charts, respectively. By August 2017, it had sold 165,000 copies in the US.

== Track listing ==
Strength of a Woman – Standard edition
No.	Title	Writer(s)	Producer(s)	Length
1.	"Love Yourself" (featuring Kanye West)	Mary J. Blige; Kanye West; Charles Hinshaw; David D. Brown; Darhyl Camper, Jr.; I. Andrews	DJ Camper	4:58
2.	"Thick of It"	Blige; Camper Jr.; Jazmine Sullivan; John Goodison; Phil Wainman	DJ Camper	4:01
3.	"Set Me Free"	Blige; Camper Jr.; Sullivan; Hinshaw	DJ Camper	3:29
4.	"It's Me"	Blige; Priscilla Renea Hamilton; Brandon "B.A.M." Hodge; Richard Butler; Dwayne Nesmith; Tremaine Neverson	B.A.M.	4:30
5.	"Glow Up" (featuring Quavo, DJ Khaled and Missy Elliott)	Blige; Camper Jr.; Sullivan; Khaled Khaled; Quavious Marshall; Melissa Elliott	DJ Camper	4:05
6.	"U + Me (Love Lesson)"	Blige; Hodge; Hinshaw; Brown	B.A.M.	4:57
7.	"Indestructible"	Blige; Hodge; Davion Farris; Eric Dawkins; Elese Teyonie Russell	B.A.M.	4:43
8.	"Thank You"	Blige; Camper Jr.; Sullivan	DJ Camper	4:05
9.	"Survivor"	Hodge; Tyler; Farris; Dave Hoddell; Spike Hoddell	B.A.M.; William Tyler^{[a]}	4:44
10.	"Find the Love"	Blige; Cainon Lamb; Derrick Baker; Vincent Berry II; Cortni Elisa Jordan	Lamb; Bigg D	3:23
11.	"Smile" (featuring Prince Charlez)	Blige; Theron Feemster; Hinshaw	Neff-U	3:42
12.	"Telling the Truth" (featuring Kaytranada)	Blige; Louis Celestin; Ashton Simmonds; Matthew Tavares; Chester Hansen; Alexander Sowinski	Kaytranada; BadBadNotGood	3:57
13.	"Strength of a Woman"	Blige; Hodge; Benjamin Wright; Farris; Dawkins	B.A.M.; Teddy Riley^{[b]}	3:49
14.	"Hello Father"	Blige; Wright; Chauncey Hollis	Hit-Boy	3:19
Total length:				57:42

Strength of a Woman – US Target edition
No.	Title	Writer(s)	Producer(s)	Length
1.	"Love Yourself" (featuring Kanye West)			4:58
2.	"Thick of It"			4:01
3.	"Set Me Free"			3:29
4.	"It's Me"			4:30
5.	"Glow Up" (featuring Quavo, DJ Khaled and Missy Elliott)			4:05
6.	"The Naked Truth"	Blige; Hodge	B.A.M.	3:39
7.	"U + Me (Love Lesson)"			4:56
8.	"Indestructible"			4:43
9.	"Thank You"			4:05
10.	"Survivor"			4:44
11.	"Find the Love"			3:23
12.	"Smile" (featuring Prince Charlez)			3:42
13.	"Telling the Truth" (featuring Kaytranada)			3:57
14.	"Strength of a Woman"			3:49
15.	"Love in the Middle"	Blige; Hodge	B.A.M.	3:27
16.	"Hello Father"			3:19
Total length:				64:48

Notes

- ^{^[a]} denotes co-producer(s)
- ^{^[b]} denotes additional producer(s)

Sample credits

- "Love Yourself" contains samples from "Nobody Knows" as performed by S.C.L.C. Breakbasket Orchestra and Choir.
- "Thick of It" embodies portions of the composition entitled "Give a Little Love" as performed by Bay City Rollers.
- "It's Me" contains samples from "Bad Decisions" as performed by Trey Songz.
- "Survivor" contains excerpts from "Nostalgia" as written by Spike and Dave Hoodell.

== Personnel ==
Credits for Strength of a Woman adapted from AllMusic.

- Miguel Atwood-Ferguson – conductor, harp arrangement, soloist, string arrangements
- Derrick Baker – composition
- Derrick "Bigg D" Baker – guitar
- Vincent Berry – composition
- Alison Bjorkedal – harp
- Mary J. Blige – composition, executive production, vocals
- David D. Brown – composition, production, backing vocals
- Gerry Brown – string engineering
- Marshall Bryant – engineering
- Caroline Buckman – viola
- Richard Butler – composition
- Daniel Caesar – backing vocals
- Darhyl "DJ" Camper Jr. – composition, drums, fender rhodes, organ, piano, production
- Paul Cartwright – violin
- Louis Celestin – composition
- Louis Kevin Celestin – drums, percussion, synthesizer bass
- Maddox Chhim – assistance
- Thomas Cullison – assistance
- Eric Dawkins – composition
- Ayanna Depas – assistance
- DJ Khaled – vocals
- Aaron Draper – percussion
- Missy Elliott – composition, vocals
- Davion Farris – composition, engineering
- Theron Feemster – composition, production
- Eddie "A&R Eddie" Fourcell – A&R
- Vanessa Freebairn-Smith – cello
- Michael Frenke – engineering
- Yesseh Furaha-Ali – alto sax
- John Goodison – composition
- Eric Gorfain – violin
- Cameron Graham – engineering
- Chester Hansen – composition, synthesizer
- Jaymz Hardy-Martin III – engineering, mixing, vocal mixing
- Charles Hinshaw – composition
- Dave Hoddell – composition
- Spike Hoddell – composition
- Brandon Hodge – composition
- Brandon "B.A.M." Hodge – composition, production
- Chauncey Hollis – composition
- Jean-Marie Horvat – mixing
- Elizabeth Isik – A&R
- Peter Jacobson – cello
- Hotae Alexander Jang – string engineering
- Jaycen Joshua – mixing
- Cortni Elisa Jordan – composition
- Leah Katz – viola
- Kaytranada – vocals
- David Kim – assistance, mixing assistance
- Steven "Q-Beatz" Kubie – programming
- Marisa Kuney – violin
- Dave Kutch – mastering
- Cainon Lamb – composition
- Songa Lee – violin
- Dennis Leupold – photography
- Timothy Loo – cello
- Quavious Marshall – composition
- Lucia Micarelli – violin
- David Nakaji – assistance
- Dwayne Nesmith – composition
- Jon Nettlesbey – assistance
- Tremaine Neverson – composition
- Prince Charlez – vocals
- Quavo – vocals
- Dexter Randall – assistance
- Frank Rein – trombone
- Wendell Kelly - trombone
- Priscilla Renea – composition
- Teddy Riley – production
- Elese Teyonie Russell – composition
- Stuart Schenk – mixing
- Ashton Simmonds – composition
- Mary Kathleen Sloan – violin
- Alexander Sowinski – clapping, composition, piano
- Dexter Story – contractor
- Jazmine Sullivan – composition, backing vocals
- Jenny Takamatsu – violin
- Matthew Tavares – composition, engineering
- Gavin Taylor – art direction, design
- Thomas Lea – viola
- Sergio "Sergical" Tsai – engineering
- William Tyler – composition
- Ina Veli – violin
- Phil Wainman – composition
- Kanye West – composition, vocals
- Eric Whatley – bass
- Chris Woods – violin
- Kevin Woods – flugelhorn, trumpet
- Benjamin Wright – composition, horn arrangements, string arrangements

== Charts ==
=== Weekly charts ===
Weekly chart performance for Strength of a Woman
Chart (2017)	Peak position
Australian Albums (ARIA)	100
Belgian Albums (Ultratop Flanders)	112
Belgian Albums (Ultratop Wallonia)	90
Canadian Albums (Billboard)	22
French Albums (SNEP)	177
Swiss Albums (Schweizer Hitparade)	63
UK Albums (OCC)	54
UK R&B Albums (OCC)	3
US Billboard 200	3
US Top R&B/Hip-Hop Albums (Billboard)	2

=== Year-end charts ===
Year-end chart performance for Strength of a Woman
Chart (2017)	Position
US Top R&B/Hip-Hop Albums (Billboard)	78
