= Love Yourself (Mary J. Blige song) =

Single by Mary J. Blige featuring Kanye West

from the album Strength of a Woman
- Released: March 30, 2017
- Length: 4:58
- Label: Capitol; Matriarch
- Songwriters: Mary J. Blige; Kanye West; Charles Hinshaw; David D. Brown; Darhyl Camper, Jr.; I. Andrews
- Producer: DJ Camper

Mary J. Blige singles chronology
"U + Me (Love Lesson)" (2017)	"Love Yourself" (2017)	"Set Me Free" (2017)

Kanye West singles chronology
"Feel Me" (2017)	"Love Yourself" (2017)	"Glow" (2017)

Music video
- "Love Yourself" on YouTube

"Love Yourself" is a song recorded by American singer Mary J. Blige featuring rapper Kanye West. It was written by Blige, West, Charles Hinshaw, David D. Brown, Darhyl "DJ" Camper, Jr. for her thirteenth studio album, Strength of a Woman (2017), while production was helmed by the latter. The song contains samples from "Nobody Knows" (1970) by The SCLC Operation Breadbasket Orchestra And Choir. Due to the inclusion of the sample, I. Andrews is also credited as a songwriter. "Love Yourself" released on March 30, 2017, as the third single from Strength of a Woman.

== Music video ==
The music video for the official remix of "Love Yourself" featuring Harlem rapper ASAP Rocky premiered via Complex on May 26, 2017. It was directed by Taj and was shot in Los Angeles and New York City. The video was uploaded to Blige's official Vevo channel on June 9, 2017.

== Credits and personnel ==
Credits adapted from the liner notes of Strength of a Woman.

- I. Andrews – writer (sample)
- Mary J. Blige – vocals, writer
- David D. Brown – writer
- Marshall Bryant – recording
- Darhyl Camper, Jr. – writer
- Jaymz Hardy-Martin III – recording
- Charles Hinshaw – writer
- David Kim – mixing assistant
- Jon Nettlesbey – recording assistant
- Kanye West – writer

== Charts ==
=== Weekly charts ===
Chart (2017)	Peak position
US Adult R&B Songs (Billboard)	11
US R&B/Hip-Hop Airplay (Billboard)	34

=== Year-end charts ===
Chart (2017)	Position
US Adult R&B Songs (Billboard)	43

== Release history ==
Country	Date	Format	Label	Ref.
United States	March 30, 2017	Digital download	Capitol Records	
