= Thick of It (Mary J. Blige song) =

Single by Mary J. Blige

from the album Strength of a Woman
- Released: October 7, 2016
- Genre: Hip hop; R&B; soul
- Length: 4:02
- Label: Capitol; Matriarch
- Songwriters: Mary J. Blige; Darhyl Camper Jr.; Jazmine Sullivan; John Goodison; Phil Wainman
- Producer: DJ Camper

Mary J. Blige singles chronology
"Doubt" (2015)	"Thick of It" (2016)	"American Skin (41 Shots)" (2016)

Music video
- "Thick of It" on YouTube

"Thick of It" is a song by American singer Mary J. Blige. It was written by Blige, Darhyl "DJ" Camper Jr., and Jazmine Sullivan for her thirteenth studio album Strength of a Woman (2017), while production was helmed by Camper. The song embodies portions of the song "Give a Little Love" (1975) by Scottish pop rock band Bay City Rollers. Due to the inclusion of the sample, John Goodison and Phil Wainman are also credited as songwriters. The song was released as the lead single from the album on October 7, 2016 . "Thick of It" went to number one on the US Adult R&B Songs chart.

== Background ==
"Thick of It" was written by Blige, Darhyl "DJ" Camper Jr., and Jazmine Sullivan, while production was helmed by the Camper. In 2017, Blige commented on the track: "This song was originally written about me fighting for my marriage. The lyrics were completely different, and it was saying things like "We just don't give up when we're in the thick of it." And then with all of this happening, it was hard to go back to the studio and do it, but I had to do it, in order to — how can I say it? — get free, because my music is therapeutic to me as well. And if I don't write about it and if I don't sing about where I am in my life, I won't start a healing process."

== Chart performance ==
"Thick of It" was released as the lead single on October 7, 2016. The song topped the US Adult R&B Songs chart for a record-breaking 16 consecutive weeks. It was Blige's fifth song to top the chart as well as the fastest climb to number one in over 20 years.

== Music video ==
The music video for "Thick of It" was directed by Dennis Leupold. It was released on November 7, 2016.

== Track listing ==
Digital download
No.	Title	Length
1.	"Thick of It"	4:02

== Credits and personnel ==
Credits adapted from the liner notes of Strength of a Woman.

- Mary J. Blige – vocals, writer
- David D. Brown – backing vocals
- Marshall Bryant – recording assistant
- Darhyl Camper Jr. – producer, writer
- Maddox Chhim – mixing assistant
- John Goodison – writer
- Jaymz Hardy-Martin III – recording
- Charles "Prince Charlez" Hinshaw – backing vocals
- Jon Nettlesbey – recording assistant
- Jaycen Joshua – mixing
- David Nakaji – mixing assistant
- Jazmine Sullivan – backing vocals, writer
- Phil Wainman – writer

== Charts ==
=== Weekly charts ===
Weekly chart performance for "Thick of It"
Chart (2016–17)	Peak position
US Adult R&B Songs (Billboard)	1
US Bubbling Under Hot 100 (Billboard)	17
US Hot R&B/Hip-Hop Songs (Billboard)	47
US R&B/Hip-Hop Airplay (Billboard)	5

=== Year-end charts ===
2016 year-end chart performance for "Thick of It"
Chart (2016)	Position
US Adult R&B Songs (Billboard)	41

2017 year-end chart performance for "Thick of It"
Chart (2017)	Position
US Adult R&B Songs (Billboard)	7

== Release history ==
Release history and formats for "Thick of Its"
Region	Date	Format(s)	Label	Ref
United States	October 7, 2016	Digital download	Capitol Records	
