= The Breakthrough Experience Tour =

2006 concert tour by Mary J. Blige

- Tour by Mary J. Blige
- Location: United States; Canada
- Associated album: The Breakthrough
- Start date: July 14, 2006
- End date: September 10, 2006
- No. of shows: 35

Mary J. Blige concert chronology
- Love & Life Tour (2004); The Breakthrough Experience Tour (2006); Heart of the City Tour (2008)

The Breakthrough Experience was the fifth concert tour by American recording artist Mary J. Blige in 2006, the tour supports her multi-platinum seventh studio album, The Breakthrough (2005). Blige performed four initial dates which kicked off on June 24, in Chicago, Illinois at the Bridgeview Stadium. The official tour began in July 2006 and continued through September 2006, visiting over 30 cities across North America.

== Opening acts ==
- Letoya Luckett
- Jaheim

== Set list ==
1. "Breakthrough" / "Black Ice Poem" (intro)
2. "MJB Da MVP"
3. "Real Love" / "Reminisce"
4. "Enough Cryin"
5. "About You"
6. "Be Happy" / "You Bring Me Joy" / "Mary Jane (All Night Long)"
7. "Baggage"
8. "Good Woman Down"
9. "Can't Hide From Luv"
10. "Take Me As I Am"
11. "Everything"
12. "Share My World" (Reprise)
13. "My Life '06"
14. "Alone" (with Dave Young)
15. "Seven Days"
16. "I'm Going Down"
17. "Father In You" (contains elements of "Black Ice Poem")
18. "I Found My Everything"
19. "No More Drama"
20. "One"
21. "Be Without You"
22. "MJB Da MVP" (reprise)

Encore

23. "Touch It" (remix)
24. "Family Affair"

== Tour dates ==
List of concerts, showing date, city, country and venue
Date (2006)	City	Country	Venue
July 14	Maryland Heights	United States	UMB Bank Pavilion
July 15	Indianapolis	United States	Conseco Fieldhouse
July 16	Charlotte	United States	Verizon Wireless Amphitheatre
July 19	Uncasville	United States	Mohegan Sun Arena
July 21	New York City	United States	Madison Square Garden
July 23	Camden	United States	Tweeter Center at the Waterfront
July 26	Burgettstown	United States	Post-Gazette Pavilion
July 27	Holmdel	United States	PNC Bank Arts Center
July 29	Cleveland	United States	Plain Dealer Pavilion
July 30	Bristow	United States	Nissan Pavilion
August 1	Boston	United States	Leader Bank Pavilion
August 4	Atlantic City	United States	Borgata Events Center
August 5	Raleigh	United States	Alltel Pavilion at Walnut Creek
August 6	Virginia Beach	United States	Verizon Wireless Amphitheatre
August 9	Selma	United States	Verizon Wireless Amphitheatre
August 11	Dallas	United States	Smirnoff Music Centre
August 12	Memphis	United States	FedExForum
August 13	Kansas City	United States	Starlight Theatre
August 18	Columbus	United States	Germain Amphitheater
August 19	Chicago	United States	Charter One Pavilion
August 20	Clarkston	United States	DTE Energy Music Theatre
August 22	Toronto	Canada	Molson Amphitheatre
August 25	Sunrise	U.S.	BankAtlantic Center
August 26	Tampa	U.S.	Ford Amphitheatre
August 27	Atlanta	U.S.	HiFi Buys Amphitheatre
September 1	Irvine	U.S.	Verizon Wireless Amphitheatre
September 2	Las Vegas	U.S.	MGM Grand Garden Arena
September 3	Los Angeles	U.S.	Gibson Amphitheatre
September 6	Phoenix	U.S.	Cricket Wireless Pavilion
September 8	Concord	U.S.	Sleep Train Pavilion
September 9	Reno	U.S.	Reno Events Center
September 10	Mountain View	U.S.	Shoreline Amphitheatre
