= We Ride (I See the Future) =

Single by Mary J. Blige

from the album Reflections (A Retrospective)
- Released: November 5, 2006
- Length: 4:04
- Label: Geffen
- Songwriters: Johntá Austin; Mary J. Blige; Bryan-Michael Cox; Kendrick Dean
- Producer: Cox

Mary J. Blige singles chronology
"Take Me as I Am" (2006)	"We Ride (I See the Future)" (2006)	"Runaway Love" (2007)

Music video
- "We Ride (I See the Future)" on YouTube

"We Ride (I See the Future)" is a song by American singer Mary J. Blige. It was written by Blige, Johntá Austin, Bryan-Michael Cox, and Kendrick "WyldCard" Dean for her first greatest hits album, Reflections (A Retrospective) (2006), whlle production on it was helmed by Cox, with Dean credited as a co-producer. The downtempo R&B record is one out of three new songs that Blige recorded for the compilation album. Lyrically, it has her singing about overcoming adversity and hoping for better days.

Selected as the album's lead single, "We Ride (I See the Future)" was released by Geffen Records to US radio in the first week of November 2006. Upon its release, it became a top ten hit in Italy and reached the top 20 in the Netherlands. In the United States, it peaked at number 28 on the Billboard Hot R&B/Hip-Hop Songs chart. A music video for the song, directed by Erik White, was filmed in New York City in early November 2006 and features Blige's then-huband, Kendu Isaacs.

== Background ==
"We Ride (I See the Future)" was written by Blige, Johntá Austin, Bryan-Michael Cox, and Kendrick "WyldCard" Dean, with production provided by Cox. Dean is credited as a co-producer on the song. Directly commissioned by Blige, the song is one out of three records that Austin and Cox wrote specifically for her greatest hits album, though only "We Ride (I See the Future)" and "Reflections (I Remember)" eventually made the cut, with midtempo track "Love Me" being omitted.

The premise of the song is a celebration of her newfound happiness with then-husband and manager, Kendu Isaacs. The song contains the lyrics "from the day to the night we ride, I see the future, baby, you and I, better with time." Cox stated "Mary's married, she's happy, in the best shape of her life, her voice is in the best shape of her life [...] people thought she was over, done, then she came through with The Breakthrough – "We Ride" celebrates all of that."

== Critical reception ==
Singersroom called "We Ride (I See the Future)" a "classic Mary J. Blige song that’s guaranteed to lift your spirits and get you moving. Whether you’re having a bad day or just need a little bit of inspiration, this song will remind you that you can ride through the storm and come out on the other side stronger than ever." Less impressed, Neil Jones from musicOMH found that "We Ride (I See the Future)" suggests "that the Blige of today is rather sadly favouring the self-obsessed, complacent ballad over the sensual, quintessential soul/hip hop fusion that so defined her pioneering years. We can only hope that this is another passing phase in a career of devilish matriculations." Similarly, Idolator follows the piano-driven template that made "No More Drama" so gripping. But she’s on the defensive right away, explaining why she’s decided to shed her anger – because she’s found a man, and he’s so great, that she sings about his putting a song in her heart. We hope, for her sake, that it’s a little bit less by-the-numbers than this one."

== Music video ==
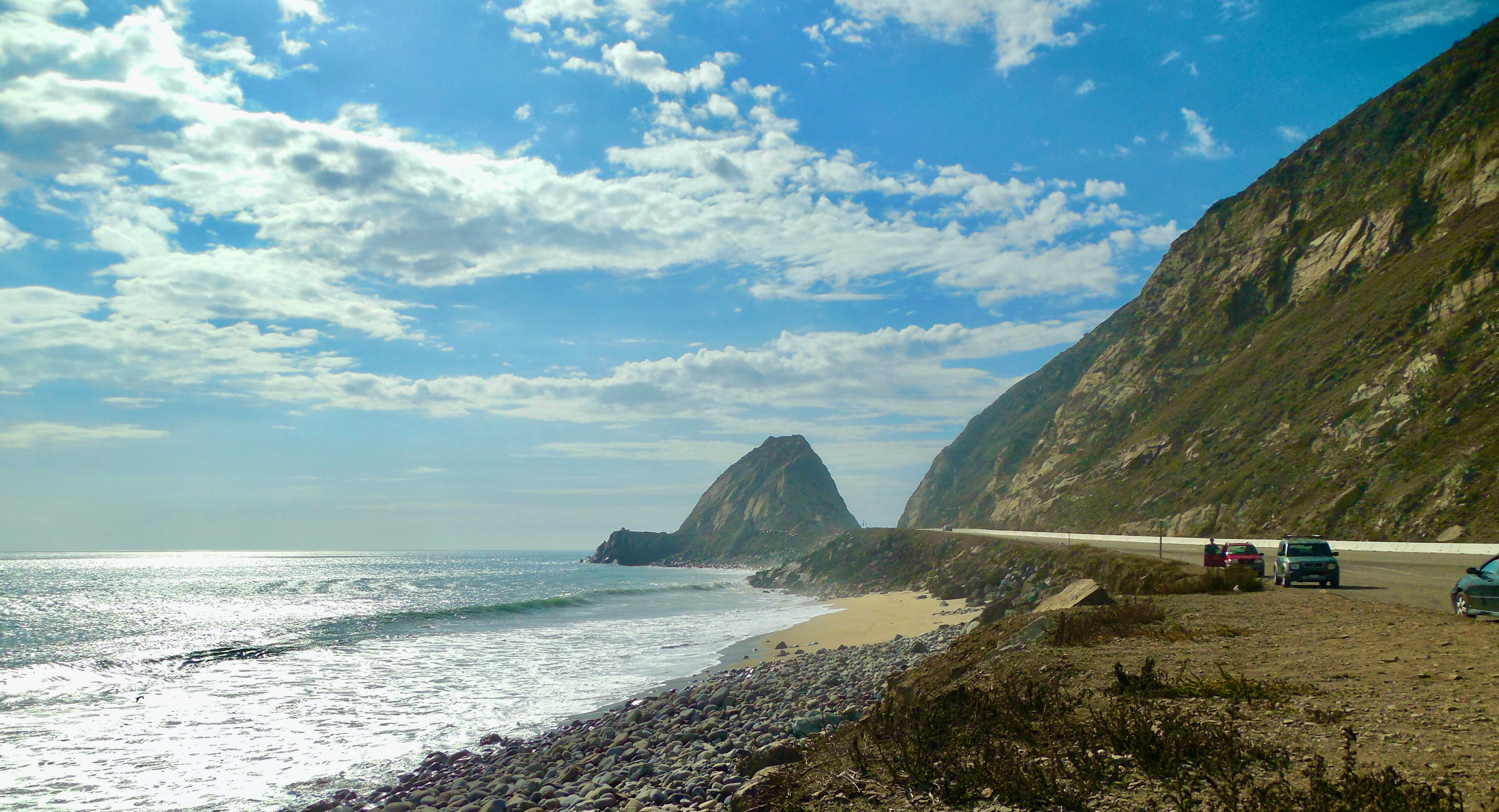
The Pacific coast in Ventura County served as a filming location.

An accompanying music video for "We Ride (I See the Future)" was shot in various locations throughout Southern California in early November 2006 and directed by Erik White. The video opens up similar to Blige's music video for "Be Without You," except it overlooks Los Angeles. Blige is singing in black with a black background then goes to her riding a blue bike. Another bike which is red and black appears which is her then-husband, Kendu Isaacs. The two leave downtown Downtown Los Angeles and continue south on the Pacific Coast Highway where they pass Point Mugu State Park. From there it switches from Blige singing in a fur vest to Blige singing in a white dress in front of an orchestra, both on rocks on the beach, to the end of the video. The visuals premiered on December 9, 2006 on the MTV network.

== Track listings ==
CD single
No.	Title	Writer(s)	Producer(s)	Length
1.	"We Ride (I See the Future)" (Album Version)	Johnta Austin; Mary J. Blige; Bryan-Michael Cox; Kendrick Dean	Cox; WyldCard^{[a]}	4:04
2.	"Be Without You" (Moto Blanco Vocal Remix)	Austin; Blige; Cox; Jason Perry	Cox; Young Smoke^{[b]}; Moto Blanco^{[c]}	8:40
3.	"We Ride (I See the Future)" (Instrumental)	Austin; Blige; Cox; Dean	Cox; WyldCard^{[a]}	4:03

Notes

- ^{^[a]} denotes co-producer(s)
- ^{^[b]} denotes additional producer(s)
- ^{^[c]} denotes remix producer(s)

== Credits and personnel ==
Credits adapted from the Reflections (A Retrospective) liner notes.

- Johnta Austin – writer
- Mary J. Blige – vocal arranger, writer
- Bryan-Michael Cox – producer, writer
- Kendrick "WyldCard" Dean – co-producer, writer
- Ron Fair – vocal arranger
- Tal Herzog – additional Pro Tools
- Kandu Isaacs – vocal recording
- Dave Pensado – mixing
- Sam Thomas – vocal tracking

== Charts ==
=== Weekly charts ===
Weekly chart performance for "We Ride (I See the Future)"
Chart (2006–2007)	Peak position
Germany (GfK)	69
Italy (FIMI)	7
Netherlands (Dutch Top 40 Tipparade)	13
US Bubbling Under Hot 100 (Billboard)	18
US Hot R&B/Hip-Hop Songs (Billboard)	38

=== Year-end charts ===
Year-end chart performance for "We Ride (I See the Future)"
Chart (2007)	Position
US Hot R&B/Hip-Hop Songs (Billboard)	99

== Release history ==
Release dates and formats for "We Ride (I See the Future)"
Region	Date	Format	Label	Ref
Various	November 5, 2006	Digital download; CD single	Geffen	
