= Reflections (A Retrospective) =

Greatest hits album by Mary J. Blige
- Released: December 12, 2006
- Recorded: July 1992 – May 2006
- Genres: R&B; soul; hip hop soul
- Length: 65:57
- Label: Geffen
- Producers: Bryan-Michael Cox, Sean "Diddy" Combs, Kendrick "WyldCard" Dean, Jerry Duplessis, Babyface, Kendu Isaacs, Jimmy Jam and Terry Lewis, Wyclef Jean, Mark Ledford, John Legend, Mark Morales, Chucky Thompson, Poke, J.U.S.T.I.C.E. League

Mary J. Blige chronology
| The Breakthrough (2005) | Reflections (A Retrospective) (2006) | Growing Pains (2007) |

Singles from Reflections (A Retrospective)
- 1. "We Ride (I See the Future)" Released: November 2006; 2. "MJB da MVP" Released: 18 December 2006 (UK only)

Reflections (A Retrospective) is the first greatest hits album by American R&B singer Mary J. Blige, released in Europe on December 1, 2006, and in the United States on December 12 by Geffen Records. The album hasn't been certified by the RIAA but has sold 900,000 (according to the December 2009 Billboard magazine issue) copies in the United States. The album has also sold an estimated 140,000 in the United Kingdom despite only reaching a peak of number forty—this was due to consistent sales of 40k+ over the Christmas weeks. As of May 25, 2008 worldwide sales are 1,381,376.

== History ==
Reflections (A Retrospective) was originally scheduled for release in November 2005 with the title Reminisce... Until the Breakthrough before the decision was made by Blige and Geffen Records to delay the release in favor of the new studio album, The Breakthrough. New songs that were due to appear on Reminisce—"Be Without You", "One", "MJB da MVP", and "Can't Hide from Luv"—were all transferred to the new album and the release date for the greatest hits was rescheduled to the spring of 2006. However, due to the commercial success of The Breakthrough, the release of Reminisce never materialized. In October 2006, Geffen Records announced that the project would finally be released on December 4, 2006 in the UK and December 12, 2006 in the U.S., under the title of Reflections (A Retrospective).

=== New material ===
Although Reflections (A Retrospective) is a retrospective collection of songs, writer Bryan-Michael Cox, who co-wrote and produced Blige's record-breaking single "Be Without You", confirmed that the release would feature four new songs, which includes the single "We Ride (I See the Future)" as well as "Reflections (I Remember)", "You Know", and "King & Queen", a duet with John Legend. The new material was originally intended to be part of a repackaged version of The Breakthrough to be released towards late 2006, but was transferred to the greatest hits release instead.

Also, on the back cover of the album (UK/International editions), track #17: the hit single "One" with U2, although it says (Mary J. Blige and U2), it is actually a solo version with U2 singing the chorus. Blige also sings the first part of the song, originally sung by Bono. This solo version is exclusive to the album, the original version with U2 (Bono's vocals) is on The Breakthrough.

== Critical reception ==
Professional ratings
Review scores
| Source | Rating |
|---|---|
| About.com | 4/5 stars |
| AllMusic | 4/5 stars |
| musicOMH | 3/5 stars |
| The Rolling Stone Album Guide | 4/5 stars |
| Slant Magazine | 2/5 stars |

Robert Sandall, writing for The Telegraph, felt that the "18-track résumé of the career of the 21st century's first lady of soul intends to deviate from the greatest-hits formula is clear from the start. The first four tracks are brand new and as strong as any of the more familiar stuff to come." musicOMH editor Neil Jones found that "Blige is undoubtedly one of the fascinating figures of modern pop culture, so even though there's more than a suspicion of Christmas cash-in here, and omissions are made, Reflections (A Retrospective) amply represents every extreme of her ouvre. It's a mixed bag that more than anything else highlights the differences between commercial and artistic creation, and as hip hop continues to veer towards the former, provides a pretty relevant story."

AllMusic's senior editor Stephen Thomas Erlewine wrote that the album "remains a completely enjoyable (if not completely satisfying) listen", going on to say that "Unfortunately, Reflections (A Retrospective) is nowhere close to being that straightforward. A mere handful of the top ten hits are included; while obvious picks [...] are present, a casual fan could rattle off just as many well-known songs that are not." Similarly, Sal Cinquemani from Slant Magazine noted that "the tracks previously unavailable on a Mary album make this a valuable purchase for diehard collectors, but it will be useless to more casual fans. The fact that Reflections might be one of the worst excuses for a greatest hits collection ever is a testament to the longevity and consistency of Mary's career."

== Commercial performance ==
Reflections (A Retrospective) debuted at number nine on the Billboard 200 Albums Chart, selling about 171,000 units in its first week. In addition, it peaked at number two on the Top R&B/Hip-Hop Albums chart. In the United Kingdom, the album debuted and peaked at number forty only, but was certified platinum by the British Phonographic Industry (BPI), for shipments of 300,000 copies.

== Track listing ==
Reflections (A Retrospective) track listing
| No. | Title | Writer(s) | Producer(s) | Length |
|---|---|---|---|---|
| 1. | "Reflections (I Remember)" | Mary J. Blige; Bryan-Michael Cox; Kendrick Dean; Johnta Austin | Cox; WyldCard^{[a]} | 4:06 |
| 2. | "We Ride (I See the Future)" | Blige; Cox; Dean; Austin | Cox; WyldCard^{[b]} | 3:57 |
| 3. | "You Know" | Blige; Sean Garrett; Eric Hudson | Hudson | 3:37 |
| 4. | "King & Queen" (duet with John Legend) | John Stephens; Avriele Crandle; Paul Bollenback; Stevie Wonder | AVenue; Legend^{[b]} | 3:46 |
| 5. | "No More Drama" | James Harris III; Terry Lewis; Barry DeVorzon; Perry Botkin Jr. | Jimmy Jam and Terry Lewis | 4:27 |
| 6. | "Family Affair" | Blige; Bruce Miller; Andre Young; Camara Kambon; Mike Elizondo; Asiah Lewis; Luchana Lodge | Dr. Dre | 4:26 |
| 7. | "Real Love" | Cory Rooney; Mark Morales | Rooney; Morales | 4:27 |
| 8. | "No One Will Do" | Erik Ortiz; Kevin Crowe; Clifford L. Brown III; Dave Young; Bunny Sigler | J.U.S.T.I.C.E. League; Blige^{[c]}; Young^{[c]} | 4:47 |
| 9. | "Be Without You" | Blige; Cox; Jason Perry; Austin | Cox; Young Smoke^{[a]}; Blige^{[c]}; Ron Fair^{[c]} | 4:06 |
| 10. | "I'm Going Down" | Norman Whitfield | Chucky Thompson; Sean "Puffy" Combs; "Prince" Charles Alexander^{[a]}; Mark "Led" Ledford^{[a]} | 3:42 |
| 11. | "911" (duet with Wyclef Jean) | Wyclef Jean; Jerry Duplessis; Katia Cadet; Mary Brown | Jean; Duplessis; Katia Cadet; Sedeck^{[a]} | 4:19 |
| 12. | "Not Gon' Cry" | Kenneth Edmonds | Babyface | 4:50 |
| 13. | "My Life 06" | Blige; Combs; Roy Ayers; Thompson; Arlene DelValle | Kendu Isaacs; Thompson^{[c]} | 5:07 |
| 14. | "Be Happy" | Blige; DeValle; Combs; Jean-Claude Olivier | Combs; Poke | 5:38 |
| 15. | "I'll Be There for You/You're All I Need to Get By (Razor Sharp Mix)" (featuring Method Man) | Clifford Smith; Robert Diggs; Nickolas Ashford; Valerie Simpson | Prince Rakeem | 3:41 |
| Total length: | | | | 65:57 |

International edition
| No. | Title | Writer(s) | Producer(s) | Length |
|---|---|---|---|---|
| 16. | "As" (with George Michael) | Wonder | Babyface | 4:41 |
| 17. | "One" (with U2) | Bono | Fair; Tal Herzberg^{[a]} | 4:20 |
| 18. | "MJB da MVP" (with 50 Cent) | Blige; Jayceon Taylor; Curtis Jackson; Ron Baker; Allan Felder; Norman Harris; Hame Johnson; Andre Lyon; Marcello Valenzano | Blige; Cool & Dre; Patrick Dillett^{[c]} | 4:10 |

Notes

- ^{^[a]} signifies additional producer(s)
- ^{^[b]} signifies co-producer(s)
- ^{^[c]} signifies vocal producer(s)

Sample credits

- "King & Queen" contains samples from the composition "Visions" as performed by Stevie Wonder.
- "No One Will Do" contains excerpts from "I Swear I Love No One but You" as performed by The O'Jays.
- "Be Happy" contains a sample of the song "You're So Good to Me" as performed by Curtis Mayfield.

== Charts ==
=== Weekly charts ===
Weekly chart performance for Reflections (A Retrospective)
| Chart (2006–2007) | Peak position |
|---|---|
| Australian Albums (ARIA) | 134 |
| Austrian Albums (Ö3 Austria) | 75 |
| Croatian International Albums (HDU) | 12 |
| Dutch Albums (Album Top 100) | 12 |
| Italian Albums (FIMI) | 52 |
| Japanese Albums (Oricon) | 30 |
| Scottish Albums (Official Charts) | 66 |
| Swedish Albums (Sverigetopplistan) | 23 |
| Swiss Albums (Schweizer Hitparade) | 19 |
| UK Albums (Official Charts) | 40 |
| UK R&B Albums (Official Charts) | 9 |
| US Billboard 200 | 9 |
| US Top R&B/Hip-Hop Albums (Billboard) | 2 |

=== Year-end charts ===
Year-end chart performance for Reflections (A Retrospective)
| Chart (2007) | Position |
|---|---|
| Australian Urban Albums (ARIA) | 43 |
| US Billboard 200 | 67 |
| US Top R&B/Hip-Hop Albums (Billboard) | 18 |

== Certifications ==
Certifications for Reflections (A Retrospective)
| Region | Certification | Certified units/sales |
|---|---|---|
| United Kingdom (BPI) | Platinum | 300,000^{‡} |
^{‡} Sales+streaming figures based on certification alone.

== Release history ==
Release history for Reflections (A Retrospective)
| Region | Date | Label(s) |
|---|---|---|
| Europe | December 1, 2006 | Geffen |
| Australia | December 2, 2006 | Geffen |
| United Kingdom | December 4, 2006 | Geffen |
| United States | December 12, 2006 | Geffen |
| Canada | December 12, 2006 | Geffen |
| Japan | December 13, 2006 | Geffen |
| Brazil | January 31, 2007 | Geffen |
