= 2006 Billboard Music Awards =

Annual American music awards ceremony

- Date: December 4, 2006
- Location: MGM Grand Garden Arena, Paradise, Nevada, U.S.

Highlights
- Most awards: Mary J. Blige (9)
- Most nominations: Mary J. Blige (13)

Television/radio coverage
- Network: FOX
- Viewership: 6.1 million

The 2006 Billboard Music Awards were held December 4, 2006 at the MGM Grand Garden Arena in Las Vegas, Nevada. The awards recognized the most popular artists and albums from 2006.

== Performances ==
Artist(s)	Song(s)
Janet Jackson	"Pleasure Principle" "So Excited"
Fergie will.i.am	"Fergalicious"
Young Jeezy; Ludacris; Pharrell	"I Luv It" "Grew Up a Screw Up" "Money Maker"
Gwen Stefani	"Wind It Up"
The Fray	"How to Save a Life"
Mary J. Blige	"Enough Cryin" "Take Me as I Am"
Kid Rock; Billy Gibbons; Nickelback	"Looking for Some Touch"

== Presenters ==
- Kid Rock - introduced Flavor Flav & Howie Mandel
- Flavor Flav & Howie Mandel - presented Pop Single of the Year
- Wynonna Judd & Dave Navarro - presented Male Country Artist of the Year
- Chingy & Three 6 Mafia - introduced the cast of The Girls Next Door and presented R&B/Hip Hop Artist of the Year
- Bow Wow & Akon - introduced Fergie & will.i.am
- Katherine McPhee & Chris Daughtry - presented Rock Album of the Year
- Frankie J & Bowling for Soup - introduced Young Jeezy, Ludacris & Pharrell
- Jesse McCartney & Kathy Griffin - presented Soundtrack Album of the Year
- Chris Angel & Danity Kane - presented Rap Artist of the Year
- Denise Richards - introduced Gwen Stefani
- Chris Kattan & Carmen Electra - presented Female Artist of the Year
- Kristin Bell, Joe Elliot & Phill Collin - presented Rock Single of the Year
- Spike Feresten, Ron Livingston & Rosemarie Dewitt - introduced The Fray
- Stevie Wonder - presented the Billboard Century Award to Tony Bennett
- Nas - introduced Mary J. Blige
- Big & Rich & Paula Abdul - presented Album of the Year
- The Killers & Courtney Love - presented Artist of the Year
- Courtney Love - introduced Kid Rock, Billy Gibbons & Nickelback

== Winners and nominees ==
Winners are listed first and in bold.

Artist of the Year	New Artist of the Year
**Chris Brown**; Nickelback; Rascal Flatts; Sean Paul	**Chris Brown**; James Blunt; The Fray; Ne-Yo
Male Artist of the Year	Female Artist of the Year
**Chris Brown**; Ne-Yo; Sean Paul; Justin Timberlake	**Rihanna**; Beyoncé; Mary J. Blige; Kelly Clarkson
Duo/Group of the Year	Male Billboard 200 Album Artist of the Year
**Nickelback**; The Fray; The Pussycat Dolls; Rascal Flatts	**Eminem**; James Blunt; Johnny Cash; Kenny Chesney
Female Billboard 200 Album Artist of the Year	Billboard 200 Album Duo/Group of the Year
**Carrie Underwood**; Mary J. Blige; Mariah Carey; Kelly Clarkson	**Rascal Flatts**; The Black Eyed Peas; Nickelback; The Pussycat Dolls
Album of the Year	Male Hot 100 Artist of the Year
**Some Hearts – Carrie Underwood**; All the Right Reasons – Nickelback; Me and My Gang – Rascal Flatts; High School Musical soundtrack – Various Artists	**Sean Paul**; Chris Brown; Ne-Yo; Justin Timberlake
Female Hot 100 Artist of the Year	Hot 100 Duo/Group of the Year
**Rihanna**; Beyoncé; Mary J. Blige; Kelly Clarkson	**Nickelback**; The All-American Rejects; The Fray; The Pussycat Dolls
Hot 100 Single of the Year	Hot 100 Airplay Song of the Year
**"Bad Day" – Daniel Powter**; "Promiscuous" – Nelly Furtado featuring Timbaland; "Temperature" – Sean Paul; "Hips Don't Lie" – Shakira featuring Wyclef Jean	**"Be Without You" – Mary J. Blige**; "Check on It" – Beyoncé featuring Bun B & Slim Thug; "So Sick" – Ne-Yo; "Temperature" – Sean Paul
Digital Album Artist of the Year	Digital Album of the Year
**The Fray**; James Blunt; Jack Johnson; John Mayer	**How to Save a Life – The Fray**; Back to Bedlam – James Blunt; Continuum – John Mayer; FutureSex/LoveSounds – Justin Timberlake
Digital Songs Artist of the Year	Digital Song of the Year
**The Fray**; The All-American Rejects; Nickelback; Sean Paul	**"Bad Day" – Daniel Powter**; "You're Beautiful" – James Blunt; "Crazy" – Gnarls Barkley; "Promiscuous" – Nelly Furtado featuring Timbaland
Videoclips Artist of the Year	Videoclip of the Year
**T.I.**; Beyoncé; Mary J. Blige; Chris Brown	**"Be Without You" – Mary J. Blige**; "So Sick" – Ne-Yo; "Touch It" – Busta Rhymes; "Why You Wanna" – T.I.
Pop 100 Artist of the Year	Pop 100 Single of the Year
**Rihanna**; Nickelback; Sean Paul; The Pussycat Dolls	**"Promiscuous" – Nelly Furtado featuring Timbaland**; "Temperature" – Sean Paul; "Bad Day" – Daniel Powter; "Hips Don't Lie" – Shakira featuring Wyclef Jean
Pop 100 Airplay Song of the Year	R&B/Hip-Hop Artist of the Year
**"Hips Don't Lie" – Shakira featuring Wyclef Jean**; "Unwritten" – Natasha Bedingfield; "Check on It" – Beyoncé featuring Bun B & Slim Thug; "Promiscuous" – Nelly Furtado featuring Timbaland	**Mary J. Blige**; Jamie Foxx; Ne-Yo; T.I.
New R&B/Hip-Hop Artist of the Year	Male R&B/Hip-Hop Artist of the Year
**Ne-Yo**; Chris Brown; LeToya; Yung Joc	**T.I.**; Chris Brown; Jamie Foxx; Ne-Yo
Female R&B/Hip-Hop Artist of the Year	R&B/Hip-Hop Duo/Group of the Year
**Mary J. Blige**; Beyoncé; Mariah Carey; Keyshia Cole	**Dem Franchize Boyz**; The Black Eyed Peas; The Isley Brothers; Three 6 Mafia
R&B/Hip-Hop Album Artist of the Year	R&B/Hip-Hop Album of the Year
**Mary J. Blige**; Jamie Foxx; Lil Wayne; T.I.	**The Breakthrough – Mary J. Blige**; Unpredictable – Jamie Foxx; In My Own Words – Ne-Yo; King – T.I.
R&B/Hip-Hop Songs Artist of the Year	R&B/Hip-Hop Single of the Year
**Mary J. Blige**; Chris Brown; Ne-Yo; T.I.	**"Be Without You" – Mary J. Blige**; "Unpredictable" – Jamie Foxx featuring Ludacris; "So Sick" – Ne-Yo; "It's Goin' Down" – Yung Joc
R&B/Hip-Hop Airplay Song of the Year	Rap Artist of the Year
**"Be Without You" – Mary J. Blige**; "Unpredictable" – Jamie Foxx featuring Ludacris; "Looking for You" – Kirk Franklin; "So Sick" – Ne-Yo	**T.I.**; Dem Franchize Boyz; Sean Paul; Yung Joc
Rap Album Artist of the Year	Rap Album of the Year
**T.I.**; Eminem; Lil Wayne; Ludacris	**King – T.I.**; Curtain Call: The Hits – Eminem; Tha Carter II – Lil Wayne; Duets: The Final Chapter – The Notorious B.I.G.
Rap Single of the Year	Country Artist of the Year
**"It's Goin' Down" – Yung Joc**; "Snap Yo Fingers" – Lil Jon featuring E-40 & Sean Paul of the YoungBloodZ; "Lean wit It, Rock wit It" – Dem Franchize Boyz featuring Lil Peanut & Charlay; "Grillz" – Nelly featuring Paul Wall, Ali & Gipp	**Kenny Chesney**; Toby Keith; Rascal Flatts; Carrie Underwood
New Country Artist of the Year	Male Country Artist of the Year
**Carrie Underwood**; Eric Church; Heartland; The Wreckers	**Kenny Chesney**; Toby Keith; Tim McGraw; Keith Urban
Female Country Artist of the Year	Country Duo/Group of the Year
**Carrie Underwood**; Sara Evans; Faith Hill; Gretchen Wilson	**Rascal Flatts**; Brooks & Dunn; Little Big Town; Sugarland
Country Album Artist of the Year	Country Album of the Year
**Rascal Flatts**; Johnny Cash; Kenny Chesney; Carrie Underwood	**Some Hearts – Carrie Underwood**; The Legend of Johnny Cash – Johnny Cash; The Road and the Radio – Kenny Chesney; Me and My Gang – Rascal Flatts
Country Songs Artist of the Year	Country Song of the Year
**Kenny Chesney**; Toby Keith; Rascal Flatts; Carrie Underwood	**"If You're Going Through Hell (Before the Devil Even Knows)" – Rodney Atkins**; "The Word" – Brad Paisley; "Summertime" – Kenny Chesney; "What Hurts the Most" – Rascal Flatts
Rock Artist of the Year	Rock Album of the Year
**Nickelback**; Disturbed; Red Hot Chili Peppers; Shinedown	**All the Right Reasons – Nickelback**; Back to Bedlam – James Blunt; A Fever You Can't Sweat Out – Panic! at the Disco; Stadium Arcadium – Red Hot Chili Peppers
Rock Single of the Year	Modern Rock Artist of the Year
**"Animal I Have Become" – Three Days Grace**; "Speak" – Godsmack; "Animals" – Nickelback; "Dani California" – Red Hot Chili Peppers	**Red Hot Chili Peppers**; AFI; Blue October; Shinedown
Modern Rock Single of the Year	Soundtrack Album of the Year
**"Dani California" – Red Hot Chili Peppers**; "Miss Murder" – AFI; "The Kill (Bury Me)" – 30 Seconds to Mars; "Animal I Have Become" – Three Days Grace	**High School Musical – Various Artists**; Walk the Line – Various Artists; Get Rich or Die Tryin' OST – Various Artists; Sing-A-Longs and Lullabies for the Film Curious George – Jack Johnson
Billboard Century Award
Tony Bennett

=== Artists with multiple wins and nominations ===
Artists that received multiple nominations
Nominations	Artist
13	Mary J. Blige
12	Ne-Yo
10	Nickelback
10	Rascal Flatts
10	T.I.
9	Sean Paul
8	Chris Brown
8	Carrie Underwood
7	Kenny Chesney
6	Beyoncé
6	Jamie Foxx
6	The Fray
6	Red Hot Chili Peppers
5	James Blunt
4	Kelly Clarkson
4	Nelly Furtado
4	The Pussycat Dolls
4	Timbaland
4	Yung Joc
3	Johnny Cash
3	Dem Franchize Boyz
3	Eminem
3	Wyclef Jean
3	Toby Keith
3	Lil Wayne
3	Ludacris
3	Daniel Powter
3	Rihanna
3	Shakira
3	Justin Timberlake
2	AFI
2	The All-American Rejects
2	The Black Eyed Peas
2	Bun B
2	Mariah Carey
2	High School Musical Cast
2	Jack Johnson
2	John Mayer
2	Shinedown
2	Slim Thug
2	Three Days Grace

Artists that received multiple awards
Wins	Artist
8	Mary J. Blige
5	T.I.
5	Carrie Underwood
4	Nickelback
3	Chris Brown
3	Kenny Chesney
3	The Fray
3	Rascal Flatts
3	Rihanna
2	Daniel Powter
2	Red Hot Chili Peppers
