= Infinity (producer) =

American songwriter and producer

Skimmy
- Also known as: Infinity
- Born: Jordan Suecof; December 2, 1983 (age 42)
- Origin: Avon, Connecticut, United States
- Genres: R&B, Hip hop, Pop
- Occupation: Producer

Jordan Suecof (born December 2, 1983), known primarily by his alias Skimmy, is an American producer. He is best known for his work with artists such as Mary J. Blige, R. Kelly, Ciara, Jacob Latimore, and Ludacris. He was a member of Capharnaum.

== Career ==
Suecof was born in Connecticut, United States. He began his career on drums but later branched out into other instruments in 1983. He began the process of making sound matter. From the bass-driven beat of the Beatles to the radiating wail of the rock era, Jordan wound down Led Zeppelin, Billy Joel and The Who. He is younger brother of producer/mixer Jason Suecof.

After his graduation at 17, Jordan made his way Orlando. His first placement came in 2005. At 21 he had a #1 Adult AC chart-topper that led to the Grammy-winning album The Breakthrough by Mary J. Blige. As the producer of "Take Me As I Am", the album also won a Grammy for Best R&B Album. That track also garnered an ASCAP award and major media buzz for Skimmy as he took home the props for R&B Song of the Year. Atlantic Records took notice. Fast-track to Lupe Fiasco's album Food and Liquor. In 2008, Jordan co-produced "DayDreamin" which also won the Grammy for Best Urban/Alternative Performance.

In 2009, Skimmy Productions collaborated with the Backstreet Boys to produce "Shattered". This was followed by two productions for R Kelly: "Echo" and "Banging the Headboard". Skimmy also produced the flipside to Ludacris' 2010 hit, "I Know You Got a Man", featuring Flo Rida. Ludacris' album, "Battle of the Sexes", achieved gold certification. The next notable collaboration for Skimmy was with Ciara on tracks such as "Stilettos" and "Yeah I Know" featured on her "Basic Instinct" album.

Skimmy wound up producing Jacob Latimore on Jive Records. Their first collaboration "Like Em All", immediately garnered over 500k views on YouTube. It became the official first single.

In 2014, Skimmy has leaped major boundaries from the title track and single off Tank's album, Stronger to the Avicii album, Stories, in which he helped produce and write "The Nights". "The Nights" surfaced online where it hit number one on Hype Machine before being released via FIFA 15.

== Selected discography ==
Year	Artist	Song	Album	Label	Charts
2005	Mary J. Blige	Take Me As I Am	The Breakthrough	Geffen Records	Billboard #1 Album
2007	Chingy	Gimme Dat (Single)	Hate It or Love It	Disturbing tha Peace; Def Jam Recordings	Billboard #84 Album
2007	Bow Wow & Omarion	Hood Star	Face Off	Columbia Records	Billboard #1 Album; Billboard #1 R&B/Hip-Hop; Billboard #1 Rap
2008	Raven-Symoné	Keep A Friend	Raven-Symoné	Hollywood Records	—
2009	Backstreet Boys	Shattered	This Is Us	Jive Records	Billboard #9 Album
2010	Ciara	Yeah I Know	Basic Instinct	LaFace; Jive Records	Billboard #44 Album; Billboard #11 R&B/Hip-Hop
2010	Flo Rida	Come With Me	Only One Flo (Part 1)	Atlantic Records	—
2010	Ludacris	I Know You Got A Man	Battle of the Sexes	Disturbing tha Peace; Def Jam Recordings	Billboard #1 Album; Billboard #1 R&B/Hip-Hop; Billboard #1 Rap
2012	Big Time Rush	Time of Our Life	Elevate	Nick Records; Columbia Records	—
2012	Melanie Fiona	Watch Me Work	The MF Life	SRC Records; Universal Republic	Billboard #7 Album; Billboard #1 R&B/Hip-Hop
2013	Marcus Canty	Used By You	This...Is Marcus Canty	Epic Records	—
2013	Marcus Canty	Don't Pass Me By	This...Is Marcus Canty	Epic Records	—
2015	Tank	Stronger	Stronger	Atlantic Records	Billboard #13 Album; Billboard #1 R&B/Hip-Hop
2015	Avicii	"The Nights"	The Days / Nights EP; Stories - UK and Japan Versions	PRMD/ Island Records	#1 UK Dance Single #6 UK Single #10 Billboard Dance Single #3 Billboard Club Single #9 ARIA Single; RIAA (U.S.): Gold; BPI (U.K.): Platinum; GLF (Sweden): Platinum; FIMI (Italy): Platinum; ARIA (Australia): Gold
2016	Popstar: Never Stop Never Stopping	"Fuck Off"	Universal Pictures	—	
