= Kendrick Dean =

American record producer, songwriter and entrepreneur

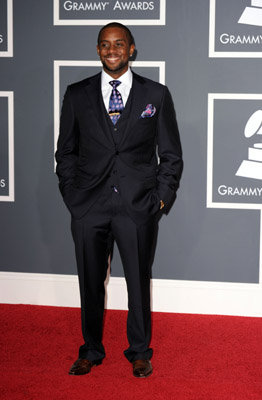
- Kendrick at the 2011 GRAMMY Awards

Background information
- Also known as: Wyldcard
- Born: Kendrick Jevon Dean
- Origin: Miami, Florida, U.S.
- Genres: R&B; pop
- Occupations: Record producer; songwriter
- Instruments: Piano, drums, strings, organ, vocals
- Years active: 2004–Present
- Label: The Dean's List Inc.

Kendrick Jevon Dean, also known as Wyldcard, is an American record producer and songwriter. He has produced or written for six Grammy Award-nominated albums. His credits include the Billboard Hot 100-number one singles Chris Brown's "Say Goodbye" and Mariah Carey's "I Stay In Love".

Dean is often incorrectly credited for compositions from Swizz Beatz, both of whom are credited as "K. Dean".

== Early life and education ==
Dean grew up in South Florida and learned to play the drums and piano from a young age. His father was a school principal and director of a church band, while his mother was a singer. He graduated from the University of Florida with a degree in history, and became a member of Iota Phi Theta fraternity.

== Career ==
From 2002 to 2004, Dean was a teacher at Evans High School in Orlando, Florida.

He used his classical, jazz and gospel music background as he transitioned into the music business. Dean began his music career in 2004 when he was first credited as a producer on mega group Destiny's Child final album Destiny Fulfilled.

== Discography ==
=== 2004 ===
- Destiny's Child - "Bad Habit"

Destiny's Child album entitled 'Destiny Fulfilled' received a Grammy Nomination for Best R&B Contemporary Album 2004

=== 2005 ===
- 112 - "Why Can't We Get Along"
- Lil' Mo - "Mother Of Your Child"
- Teairra Mari - "Phone Booth"
- Toni Braxton - "Trippin' (That's The Way Love Works)"
- Chris Brown - "Say Goodbye"
- Chris Brown - "Winner"
- Chris Brown - "One Mo' Gin"

Chris Brown's album entitled 'Chris Brown' received a Grammy Nomination for Best R&B Contemporary Album 2005

=== 2006 ===
- Avant - "Director"
- Danity Kane - "Back Up"
- Danity Kane - "One Shot"
- Danity Kane - "Ride For You"
- Kenny Lattimore & Chanté Moore - "Figure It Out"
- Sammie - "I Can't"
- Frankie J - "Priceless"
- Brian Mcknight - "Comfortable"
- Ciara - "So Hard"
- Mary J. Blige - "We Ride (I See The Future)"
- Mary J. Blige - "Reflections (I Remember)"
- Tyrese - "Gotta Get You"
- Omarion - "Made For TV"
- Omarion - "Just Can't Let You Go"

=== 2007 ===
- Marques Houston - "Circle"
- Joe - "Go Hard"
- Joe - "I Feel For You"
- Joe - "You Should Know Me"
- Bobby Valentino - "How 'Bout It"
- B5 - "Erica Kane"
- B5 - "Right To Left"
- Keyshia Cole - "Was It Worth It"
- Trey Songz - "Last Time"
- Chris Brown - "Throwed"
- Chris Brown - "This Christmas"
- Chris Brown - "Fallen Angel"
- Chris Brown - "Try A Little Tenderness"
- Brandy - "Make Me Cry"
- Brandy - "You Got That"
- Brandy - "Take Me Back"

Keyshia Cole's album entitled 'Just Like You' received a Grammy Nomination for Best R&B Contemporary Album 2007

=== 2008 ===
- Raheem DeVaughn - "Empty"
- Danity Kane - "Sucka For Love"
- Danity Kane - "2 Of You"
- Day26 - "Since You've Been Gone"
- Mariah Carey - "I Stay In Love"
- Usher - "Before I Met You"
- Day 26 - “Just Shoulda Told You”
- Joe - “We Need To Roll”

=== 2009 ===
- Ginuwine - "One Time For Love"
- Mary J. Blige - "Hood Love"
- Day 26 - “Stadium Music”
- Day 26 - “So Good”
- Day 26 - “Baby Maker”
- Yolanda Adams - “You”
- New Kids On The Block - “Coming Home”

=== 2010 ===
- Monica - "Superman"
- Monica - "Still Standing"
- Monica - "All I Know Is Me"
- Monica - "Lesson's Learned"

Monica's album entitled 'Still Standing' received a Grammy Nomination for Best R&B Album 2010

=== 2011 ===
- Jordan Knight - “Believe”
- Ginuwine - “Frozen”
- Ginuwine - “Break”
- Tyrese - “One Night”
- Tyrese - “Nothing On You”
- Tyrese - “Best In Me”
- Tyrese - “I Miss That Girl”
- Tyrese - “Make Love”
- Tyrese - “It's All On Me”
- Tyrese - “Angel”
- Tyrese - “Home”
- Tyrese - “Rest of Our Lives”
- Tyrese - “Take Over”
- Johnny Gill - “Long Long Time”
- Keke Palmer - "Facebook Stalker"

Tyrese's album entitled 'Open Invitation' received a Grammy Nomination for Best R&B Contemporary Album 2012

=== 2012 ===
- Q. Parker - “Show You How”
- Q. Parker - “2 Of Us”
- Q. Parker - “Yes” (interlude)

=== 2013 ===
- Ann Nesby - “Let It Be”
- Ann Nesby - “This Time”
- Ann Nesby -“Remember”
- Ann Nesby - “Through With You”
- Ron Isley - “Let’s Be Alone”
- Tamar Braxton - “Pieces”

=== 2014 ===
- Gabriel Orengo - “AyAyAy”
- Gabriel Orengo - “Damelo”

=== 2015 ===
- Tyrese - “Leave”
- Wolfgang Gartner - “You Wear Me Out”

Tyrese's album entitled 'Black Rose' received a Grammy Nomination for Best R&B Album 2015

=== 2016 ===
- Trevor Jackson - "Pogo"
- Avery Wilson - "Love You More"
- Oshea - L.O.T.R.
- Krishane -"DUMB"

=== 2017 ===
- Jonghyun - "Only One You Need"

=== 2018 ===
- Lei McQueen - "Good Luck"

=== 2026 ===
- Sam Collier - "That's What I'm Here For"
