= BET Awards 2006 =

American entertainment awards ceremony

6th BET Awards
- Date: June 27, 2006
- Location: Shrine Auditorium, Los Angeles, California
- Presented by: Black Entertainment Television
- Hosted by: Damon Wayans

Television/radio coverage
- Network: BET

The 6th BET Awards took place at the Shrine Auditorium in Los Angeles, California on June 27, 2006. The awards recognized Americans in music, acting, sports, and other fields of entertainment over the past year. Comedian Damon Wayans hosted the event for the first time.

== Performers ==
Artist(s)	Song(s)
Beyoncé; Jay-Z	Déjà Vu
T.I.	What You Know
Jamie Foxx; Fantasia	DJ Play a Love Song; Do What It Do
Chris Brown; Lil Wayne	Run It! Gimme That; Yo (Excuse Me Miss)
Mary J. Blige	Be Without You; Enough Cryin
Keyshia Cole	Love
Diddy; Yung Joc	It's Goin' Down
Busta Rhymes; Will.i.am; Kelis; Mary J. Blige; Rah Digga; Missy Elliott; Lloyd Banks; Papoose; DMX; Eminem	I Love My Chick; Touch It remix
Prince; Stevie Wonder; Chaka Khan; India Arie; Yolanda Adams	Chaka Khan Lifetime Achievement Tribute; Sweet Thing; Tell Me Something Good; Through the Fire; I Feel for You; I'm Every Woman
Ne-Yo	Sexy Love; So Sick
Prince	3121

== Nominees and winners ==
Best Female Hip Hop Artist	Best Male Hip Hop Artist
Missy Elliott; Lil' Kim; Remy Ma; Shawnna; Trina	T.I.; 50 Cent; Busta Rhymes; Common; Kanye West
Best Female R&B Artist	Best Male R&B Artist
Mary J. Blige; India Arie; Mariah Carey; Keyshia Cole; Beyoncé	Prince; Jamie Foxx; Chris Brown; Ne-Yo; Anthony Hamilton
Best Group	Best Gospel Artist
The Black Eyed Peas; Three 6 Mafia; Destiny's Child; Mary Mary; Floetry	Kirk Franklin; Mary Mary; Yolanda Adams; CeCe Winans; Smokie Norful
Best New Artist	BET J
Chris Brown; Ne-Yo; Rihanna; Paul Wall; Chamillionaire	Anthony Hamilton; Eric Benet; Heather Headley; Kindred the Family Soul; Corrine Bailey Rae
Video of the Year	Viewers' Choice
Mary J. Blige "Be Without You"; Kanye West featuring Jamie Foxx "Gold Digger"; Beyoncé featuring Slim Thug "Check on It"; Busta Rhymes featuring Mary J. Blige, Rah Digga, Missy Elliott, Lloyd Banks, Papoose & DMX "Touch It (Remix)"; Missy Elliott featuring Ciara & Fatman Scoop "Lose Control"; R. Kelly "Trapped in the Closet"	Chris Brown "Yo (Excuse Me Miss)"; T.I. "What You Know"; Mariah Carey "Don't Forget About Us"; Keyshia Cole "Love"; Busta Rhymes "Touch It"; Ne-Yo "So Sick"
Best Collaboration	Special Awards
Kanye West featuring Jamie Foxx "Gold Digger"; Busta Rhymes featuring Papoose, Rah Digga, Missy Elliott, DMX, Mary J. Blige & Lloyd Banks "Touch It (remix)"; Bow Wow featuring Ciara "Like You"; Jamie Foxx featuring Ludacris "Unpredictable"; Beyoncé featuring Slim Thug & Bun B "Check on It"	Lifetime Achievement Chaka Khan; Humanitarian Harry Belafonte
Best Actress	Best Actor
Taraji P. Henson; Alfre Woodard; Tichina Arnold; Thandie Newton; Queen Latifah	Terrence Howard; Denzel Washington; Jamie Foxx; Don Cheadle; Ludacris
Sportswoman of the Year	Sportsman of the Year
Venus Williams; Serena Williams; Lisa Leslie; Sheryl Swoopes; Chamique Holdsclaw	LeBron James; Vince Young; Kobe Bryant; Tiger Woods; Shaquille O'Neal
