= The Breakthrough =

Studio album by Mary J. Blige
- Released: December 20, 2005
- Genre: R&B
- Length: 71:51
- Label: Geffen
- Producers: 9th Wonder; Mary J. Blige; Vidal Davis; Cool & Dre; Bryan-Michael Cox; D'Mile; Ron Fair; Andre Harris; Rich Harrison; Infinity; J.U.S.T.I.C.E. League; Jake and the Phatman; Rodney Jerkins; Jimmy Jam & Terry Lewis; Davel "Bo" McKenzie; Raphael Saadiq; Chucky Thompson; will.i.am

Mary J. Blige chronology
Love & Life (2003)	The Breakthrough (2005)	Growing Pains (2007)

Singles from The Breakthrough
- 1. "Be Without You" Released: November 14, 2005; 2. "Enough Cryin" Released: March 2, 2006; 3. "One" Released: April 3, 2006; 4. "Take Me as I Am" Released: August 17, 2006

The Breakthrough is the seventh studio album by American singer Mary J. Blige. It was released by Geffen Records on December 20, 2005. Initially expected to be released in 2006, it switched release dates with Blige's first greatest hits album Reflections (A Retrospective) after fruitful collaborations with a host of songwriters and record producers, including 9th Wonder, Rodney Jerkins, Jimmy Jam and Terry Lewis, Bryan-Michael Cox, J.U.S.T.I.C.E. League, Raphael Saadiq, Chucky Thompson, Cool & Dre, Ron Fair, and will.i.am, prompted Blige and her label to shift material from Reflections to The Breakthrough.

The album was released to positive reception from music critics, who considered it a return to form for Blige after 2003's Love & Life. Commercially, it opened to her biggest first week sales in the US yet and became her third album to debut at the top of the Billboard 200. The album reached triple Platinum status in the US and sold more than 3.1 million copies by 2009, her highest-selling US album of the 2000s. Internationally, it entered the top ten in Switzerland, and the R&B charts in both Australia and United Kingdom. The Breakthrough received numerous accolades, earning Blige her first Grammy Award for Best R&B Album at the 49th awards ceremony.

Four singles were released in support of the album. Lead single "Be Without You" became a top three hit on the US Billboard Hot 100 as well as Blige's highest-charting single since 2001's "Family Affair", while international follow-up "One", a duet with Irish rock band U2 on their 1991 song, enjoyed major commercial success throughout Europe, reaching number one in Austria and Norway as well as the top ten on most other charts. From June to September 2006, Blige promoted The Breakthrough in her The Breakthrough Experience Tour, which visited several cities throughout Canada and the United States.

== Background ==
In 2003, Blige released Love & Life, which she called a "misstep" and was her lowest selling studio album at the time. The Geffen label then planned a greatest hits set for her next release, before the plan switched to a brand new record. By 2005, Blige was "awash in bliss" with her then-two year marriage to Kendu Issacs. While the press described The Breakthrough as being about her love for Isaacs, Blige revealed the true meaning of the album: “It’s not just about choosing to be in love with him—it’s about choosing to be in love with myself.”

== Composition ==
The "glistening" album opener "No One Will Do" is about finding new love. Blige raps on "Enough Cryin," track two and the second single. "About You," track three, is an ode to loyalty in a relationship. Track four and lead single, "Be Without You," features a "rapturous" piano melody and "stunning" vocals from Blige singing about a "honeymoon phase." Pitchfork called track five, "Gonna Breakthrough," a "lavish" dance floor number. The "anthemic" sixth song, "Good Woman Down," sees Blige recounting cycles of abuse, positioning her as a living example of "survival." Song seven, "Take Me as I Am," is a ballad, while the "standout" following track, "Baggage," incorporates synths and is about "recognizing patterns."

Jay-Z plays a "hypeman" on track nine, "Can't Hide from Luv," a song about ending self-sabotaging habits. The promotional single "MJB da MVP," track 10, has a mixtape quality. Track 11, "Can't Get Enough," is a "clear-headed" ballad about finding commitment. On "Ain't Really Love," track 12, Blige "leans into the independence she’s earned." The symphonic power ballad "I Found My Everything," track 13 with Raphael Saadiq, highlights Blige's "blues voice." The next track, "Father in You," is about tracing the "need for male affection." Album closer "One" with U2 was likened to a stadium anthem. Gospel-tinged vocals appear throughout the album.

Los Angeles Times critic Natalie Nichols credited the producers for "adeptly weaving beats and live instruments, vocals and rapping, melody and rhythm in configurations alternately stark and lush." Prefix critic Norman Mayers found that The Breakthrough "zips confidently through its sixteen tracks. The album's first two-thirds is so well paced that the eleventh track seems to come around before you can catch your breath. The musical palette is a blend of contemporary Kanye West–style productions and classic mid-tempo soul." In The New York Times, Jon Pareles credited the singer for bringing together "hip-hop realism and soul's higher aspirations, hip-hop's digitized crispness and soul's slow-building testimonies."

== Release and promotion ==
Blige embarked on several live performances and appearances to promote the release of The Breakthrough. At the 5th Annual BET Awards (2005), she performed with rapper Game during his performance of "Hate It or Love It" on June 28, 2005. In October 2005, she sung a medley of "You're All I Need to Get By" with Method Man, "I'm Goin' Down", "Real Love", and "Can't Hide from Luv" on BET's 25 Strong: The BET Silver Anniversary Special. In November 2005, Blige was honored with the V Legend Award at the 2005 Vibe Awards. On December 21, 2005, the singer was interviewed and performed on The Tyra Banks Show, singing a rendition of "Can't Hide from Luv." On December 31, 2005, Blige sung a medley of "Family Affair", "Can't Hide from Luv", and "Be Without You" on New Year's Eve with Carson Daly.

On February 8, 2006, Blige performed "One" with U2 at the 48th Annual Grammy Awards. In April 2006, she performed "Be Without You" and "Enough Cryin" on Saturday Night Live. At the 2006 BET Awards, Blige sung a medley of "Be Without You" and "Enough Cryin." From July 14, 2006, to September 10, 2006, Blige embarked on The Breakthrough Experience Tour. Letoya Luckett and Jaheim were opening acts during the tour. On December 4, 2006, Blige performed "Enough Cryin" and "Take Me as I Am" at the 2006 Billboard Music Awards, where she won nine awards. At the 49th Annual Grammy Awards, on February 11, 2007, Blige performed "Be Without You."

== Critical reception ==
Professional ratings
Aggregate scores
Source	Rating
Metacritic	76/100
Review scores
Source	Rating
AllMusic	4.5/5 stars
Encyclopedia of Popular Music	3/5 stars
Entertainment Weekly	B+
The Guardian	3/5 stars
The Independent	4/5 stars
Los Angeles Times	3/4 stars
NME	8/10
Pitchfork	8.8/10
Rolling Stone	4/5 stars
Spin	B−

The Breakthrough was met with generally positive reviews. At Metacritic, which assigns a normalized rating out of 100 to reviews from professional publications, the album received an average score of 76, based on 20 reviews. Andy Gill of The Independent deemed it perhaps "her best, the most vivid realisation of her gripping, confessional style." David Browne believed The Breakthrough marked a return for Blige to her dramatic strengths, writing in Entertainment Weekly that the music's "messy sprawl of conflicted emotions feels true to her fierce, prickly personality (not to mention life itself)." Stylus Magazine's Thomas Inskeep viewed it as a "return to form" for Blige, calling it her "finest full-length since '99's Mary," while Rolling Stone journalist Barry Walters said that unlike with her previous albums, The Breakthrough's ballads genuinely stand out.

Andy Kellman from AllMusic said each song proved Blige had been given her "best round of productions" since the mid 1990s. Steve Jones of USA Today wrote that "Blige balances her trademark edginess with the personal happiness she has found in recent years" and her producers "give her compelling musical backdrops". A 2023 review from Pitchfork's Clover Hope called it "an unofficial marker of a more self-actualized Mary J. Blige" as well as "so self-referential that it almost does function like a greatest-hits record the label wanted".

Jason King was less impressed in The Village Voice, feeling that The Breakthrough had improved on Blige's 2003 album Love & Life but still lacked the creativity of 1999's Mary. Blige's penchant for "hermetic, clinically slick production values doesn't complement her soul-baring aura," King wrote. Spin journalist Tom Breihan felt the production's "awkwardly programmed drums and cluttered synthetic arrangements" generally failed to give her a conducive space for an effective performance and left "the songs' chin-up aphorisms ringing false." Slant Magazine's Sal Cinquemani was more critical of the lyrics, finding them distastefully sentimental, unsubtle, and "the epitome of formulaic, giving you the feeling that you've heard this all before." John Murphy from musicOMH's found that like Blige's "previous albums, The Breakthrough is overlong and spoilt by too many producers sticking their oar in. One of these days she'll produce a tight, focused album that's worthy of her wonderful voice – The Breakthrough isn't it, but there's enough good moments to keep her legions of fans more than happy." In his lukewarm review for Vibe, Dimitri Ehrlich noted that "even cameos by today’s hottest rappers can’t shake Blige's nostalgic flair."

== Accolades ==
The Breakthrough and its singles earned Blige numerous awards and nominations. She received eight nominations at the 49th Annual Grammy Awards, the most of any artist for that ceremony. "Be Without You" was nominated for both Record of the Year and Song of the Year categories; it won for Best Female R&B Vocal Performance and Best R&B Song, while The Breakthrough won in the category of Best R&B Album. Blige was recognized as Favorite Soul/R&B Female Artist and won in the Favorite Soul/R&B Album category, among the three awards she was nominated for at the American Music Awards of 2006. Blige won nine prizes at the 2006 Billboard Music Awards, including Top R&B Album, Top R&B Artist, R&B/Hip-Hop Album Artist of the Year and Female R&B/Hip-Hop Artist of the Year. At the BET Awards 2006 she won two awards, including Best Female R&B/Pop Artist and Video of the Year. Blige also won Outstanding Female Artist at the 38th NAACP Image Awards.

=== Year-end lists ===
Year-end lists for The Breakthrough
Publication	Accolade	Rank	Ref.
Associated Press	The 10 Best Albums of 2006	2	
The Village Voice	Pazz & Jop	122	

== Commercial performance ==
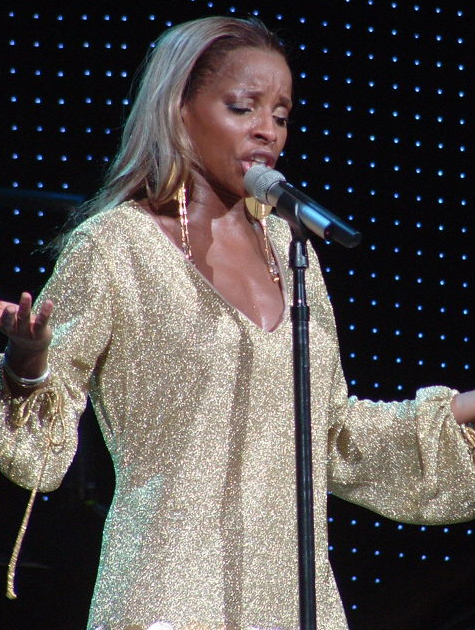
In the US, The Breakthrough became Blige's third number-one album.

The Breakthrough debuted at number one on both the US Billboard 200 and Top R&B/Hip-Hop Albums in the week of January 7, 2006. Blige's third album to do so, it sold 727,000 copies in its first week of release, becoming the biggest first-week sales for a female R&B solo artist in SoundScan history, the fifth largest first-week sales for a female artist, and the fourth largest debut of 2005. The biggest-selling R&B album of the year, Billboard ranked it first on its 2006 Top R&B/Hip-Hop Albums year-end chart. It was also ranked fifth on the magazine's Billboard 200 year-end chart of 2006.

The Breakthrough was certified Gold and Platinum by the Recording Industry Association of America (RIAA) on the January 24, 2006. It eventually reached double Platinum on March 10, 2006 and triple Platinum status on April 10, 2007. By December 2009, the album had sold 3,100,000 copies in the United States. The Breakthrough charted at number 135 on the Billboard 200 decade-end chart in 2009, becoming Blige's most successful US album in the 2000s.

In the United Kingdom, The Breakthrough debuted at number 48 on the UK Albums Chart and number six on the UK R&B Albums chart in the week of December 24, 2005. It eventually peaked at number 22 in April 2006. On February 3, 2006, the album earned a Gold certification from the British Phonographic Industry (BPI) for shipments in excess of 100,000 units. Elsewhere, The Breakthrough reached number one on the Australian Urban Albums chart and the top ten on the Swiss Albums Chart. It reached Gold status in Australia, Germany, and Japan and was certified Platinum by the International Federation of the Phonographic Industry (IFPI) in Switzerland.

== Track listing ==
The Breakthrough – Standard edition
No.	Title	Writer(s)	Producer(s)	Length
1.	"No One Will Do"	Erik Ortiz; Kevin Crowe; Clifford L. Brown III; Dave Young; Bunny Sigler	J.U.S.T.I.C.E. League; Mary J. Blige^{[a]}; Young^{[a]}	4:46
2.	"Enough Cryin" (featuring Brook Lynn)	Blige; Rodney Jerkins; Sean Garrett; Shawn Carter	Jerkins; Garrett^{[a]}	4:20
3.	"About You" (featuring will.i.am & Nina Simone)	Blige; will.i.am; Keith Harris; Anthony Newley; Leslie Bricusse	will.i.am	4:04
4.	"Be Without You"	Blige; Bryan-Michael Cox; Jason Perry; Johntá Austin	Cox; Blige^{[a]}; Ron Fair^{[a]}; Young Smoke^{[b]}	4:06
5.	"Gonna Breakthrough" (featuring Brook Lynn)	Blige; Diana Gordon; Dernst Emile; Quarun Wages; Harry Palmer	D'Mile; Blige^{[a]}; Fair^{[a]}	4:00
6.	"Good Woman Down"	Blige; Garrett; Patrick Douthit; Robert Aries; Freddie Jackson; Meli'sa Morgan	9th Wonder; Garrett^{[a]}; Fair^{[c]}	4:07
7.	"Take Me as I Am"	Jordan Suecof; Ezekiel Lewis; Candice Nelson; Keri Hilson; Thabiso Nkhereanye; Lonnie Liston Smith	Infinity; Fair; Blige^{[a]}; Fair^{[a]}	3:57
8.	"Baggage"	Blige; James Harris III; Terry Lewis; Bobby Ross Avila; Issiah J. Avila; James Q. Wright; Young	Jimmy Jam & Terry Lewis; B.R. Avila^{[d]}; Issiah "Iz" Avila^{[d]}; Blige^{[a]}; Young^{[a]}	3:35
9.	"Can't Hide from Luv" (featuring Jay-Z)	Blige; Andre Harris; Vidal Davis; Ryan Toby	A. Harris; Davis	3:52
10.	"MJB da MVP"	Curtis Jackson; Jayceon Taylor; Andre Lyon; Marcello Valenzano; Norman Harris; Ron Baker; Allan Felder; James Johnson; Patrice Rushen; Karen Evans; Roy Ayers	Blige; Cool & Dre; Patrick Dillett^{[a]}	4:00
11.	"Can't Get Enough"	Blige; J. Harris III; Lewis; B.R. Avila; I.J. Avila	Jimmy Jam & Terry Lewis; James "Big Jim" Wright^{[d]}; B. R. Avila^{[d]}; I. Avila^{[d]}	3:40
12.	"Ain't Really Love"	Blige; Cox; Austin; Candice Childress	Cox; Blige^{[a]}; Austin^{[a]}; Fair^{[a]}	4:40
13.	"I Found My Everything" (featuring Raphael Saadiq)	Blige; Saadiq; Kelvin Wooten; Robert Ozuna	Saadiq; Jake and the Phatman^{[d]}; Troy Taylor^{[a]}	5:23
14.	"Father in You"	Blige; A. Harris; Davis; Toby	A. Harris; Davis	5:23
15.	"Alone" (featuring Dave Young)	Davel "Bo" McKenzie; Young	McKenzie; Blige^{[a]}; Young^{[a]}	4:29
16.	"One" (with U2)	Bono; Adam Clayton; The Edge; Larry Mullen Jr.	Fair; Tal Herzberg^{[d]}	4:20
Total length:				68:11

The Breakthrough – LP edition (hidden track)
No.	Title	Writer(s)	Producer(s)	Length
17.	"Show Love"	Blige; Garrett; Chucky Thompson	Thompson	3:40
Total length:				71:51

The Breakthrough – International edition (bonus track)
No.	Title	Writer(s)	Producer(s)	Length
17.	"So Lady" (featuring Raphael Saadiq)	Blige; Saadiq; Teedra Moses	Saadiq; Jake and the Phatman^{[d]}	4:16
Total length:				72:27

The Breakthrough – British and digital deluxe edition (bonus track)
No.	Title	Writer(s)	Producer(s)	Length
18.	"Show Love"	Blige; Garrett; Thompson	Thompson	3:40
Total length:				76:07

The Breakthrough – Japanese edition (bonus track)
No.	Title	Writer(s)	Producer(s)	Length
19.	"Out My Head"	Young; Harrison	Rich Harrison	3:41
Total length:				79:48

=== Notes ===
- ^{^[a]} signifies a vocal producer
- ^{^[b]} signifies an additional producer
- ^{^[c]} signifies an additional vocal producer
- ^{^[d]} signifies a co-producer

=== Sample credits ===
- "No One Will Do" contains excerpts from "I Swear I Love No One but You", written by Bunny Sigler and performed by the O'Jays.
- "About You" contains samples from "Feeling Good", written by Anthony Newley and Leslie Bricusse and performed by Nina Simone.
- "Gonna Breakthrough" contains samples from "The Champ", written by Harry Palmer and performed by the Mohawks.
- "Good Woman Down" contains excerpts from "Heart Breaking Decision", written by Robert Aries, Freddie Jackson and Meli'sa Morgan and performed by Morgan.
- "Take Me as I Am" contains samples from "A Garden of Peace", written and performed by Lonnie Liston Smith.
- "Can't Hide from Luv" contains excerpts and a sample of "I Wanna Be Where You Are", written by Arthur Ross and Leon Ware and performed by Michael Jackson.
- "MJB da MVP" contains excerpts from "Rubberband", written by Ron Baker, Allen Felder and Norman Harris and performed by the Trammps. It also contains resung lyrics from "All Night Long", written by James Johnson, "Remind Me", written by Patrice Rushen and Karen Evans, and "Everybody Loves the Sunshine", written by Roy Ayers.

== Personnel ==
Credits for The Breakthrough adapted from AllMusic.

- 50 Cent – vocals
- Chalmers Alford – guitar
- Johnta Austin – vocal producer
- Bobby Ross Avila – guitar, keyboards, producer, strings
- Issiah "IZ" Avila – bass guitar, drums, percussion, producer
- Robert Bacon – guitar
- Charlie Bisharat – string instrument
- Mary J. Blige – producer, vocal arrangement, vocal producer, vocals
- Bono – guitar, vocals
- Jacqueline Brand – violin
- Craig Brockman – piano
- Charles "Biscuits" Brungardt – vocal producer
- Roberto Cani – violin
- Lily Chen – violin
- Danny Cheung "Stems" – engineer
- Candice Childress – production coordination
- Adam Clayton – bass guitar
- Larry Corbett – cello
- Bryan-Michael Cox – instrumentation, producer, string arrangements
- Vidal Davis – instrumentation, producer
- Loren Dawson – piano
- Mario Diaz de Leon – violin
- Brian Dembow – viola
- Joel Deroin – string instrument
- Patrick Dillett – engineer, vocal producer
- Reginald Dozier – engineer
- Andrew Duckles – viola
- Bruce Dukov – violin
- The Edge – guitar
- Michael Eleopoulos – assistant engineer, engineer
- Stephen Erdody – cello
- Anthony "Devyne" Evans – engineer
- Anthony Lavon Evans – engineer
- Ron Fair – conductor, guitar, harmonica, keyboards, orchestra bells, organ, piano, producer, string arrangements, vocal arrangement, vocal producer
- Jan Fairchild – engineer
- AMarlow Fisher – viola
- Drew FitzGerald – art direction
- Paul Foley – engineer
- Samuel Formicola – viola
- Matt Funes – string instrument
- Sean Garrett – vocal producer
- Endre Genet – string instrument
- Julie Gigante – violin
- Carl Glanville – original recordings
- Larry Gold – string arrangements
- John Goux – acoustic and electric guitar
- Endre Granat – violin
- Bernie Grundman – mastering
- Alan Grunfeld – string instrument
- Rexsell Hardy, Jr. – drums
- Andre Harris – instrumentation, producer
- Keith Harris – keyboards, organ, piano, synthesizer bass
- Clayton Haslop – violin
- Tal Herzberg – digital editing, engineer, producer
- Keri Hilson – vocal arrangement
- Paula Hochhalter – cello, strings
- Infinity – producer
- Kendu Isaacs – mixing
- Jun Ishizeki – assistant engineer
- Jake & the Phatman – producer
- Jimmy Jam – producer
- Jaycen Joshua – assistant engineer, engineer, mixing
- Rodney Jerkins – mixing, producer
- Justice League – producer
- Suzie Katayama – cello
- Bernard Kenny – bass guitar
- Kimberly Kimble – hair stylist
- Markus Klinko & Indrani – photography
- Armen Ksadjikian – cello
- Songa Lee – violin
- Natalie Leggett – violin
- Phillipe Levy – violin
- Terry Lewis – producer
- Andrea Liberman – stylist
- David Low – string instrument
- David Lowery – string instrument
- Rene Mandel – violin
- Matt Marrin – engineer
- Tony Maserati – mixing
- Harvey Mason, Sr. – glockenspiel, timpani
- Darrin McCann – viola
- Davel "Bo" McKenzie – producer
- Cornelius Mims – bass
- Vicki Miskolczy – viola
- Peter Mokran – mixing
- Wesley Morrow – production coordination
- Larry Mullen, Jr. – drums, percussion
- Dean Nelson – assistant, mixing
- 9th Wonder – producer
- Robin Olson – violin
- Robert Ozuna – drums, percussion, scratching
- Sid Page – violin
- Alyssa Park – violin
- Dave Pensado – mixing
- Katia Popov – violin
- Jack Joseph Puig – mixing
- Frank Romano – guitar
- Mark Robertson – violin
- Mally Roncal – make-up
- Anatoly Rosinsky – violin
- Raphael Saadiq – bass guitar, guitar, producer
- Allen Sides – engineer
- The South Central Chamber Orchestra – strings
- South Central Orchestra – strings
- Tereza Stanislav – string instrument
- Supa Engineer "Dura" – mixing
- John Tanksley – assistant engineer, engineer
- Troy Taylor – vocal producer
- Cecilia Tsan – cello
- Charles Vail – strings
- Josephina Vergara – violin
- will.i.am – engineer, keyboards
- Kelvin Wooten – keyboards
- Benjamin Wright – string arrangements, string conductor, string writing
- James "Big Jim" Wright – keyboards, producer
- Dave Young – performer
- Dave Young Orchestra – vocal producer

== Charts ==
=== Weekly charts ===
Weekly chart performance for The Breakthrough
Chart (2006)	Peak position
Australian Albums (ARIA)	19
Australian Urban Albums (ARIA)	1
Austrian Albums (Ö3 Austria)	42
Belgian Albums (Ultratop Flanders)	66
Croatian International Albums (HDU)	10
Danish Albums (Hitlisten)	20
Dutch Albums (Album Top 100)	12
French Albums (SNEP)	25
German Albums (Offizielle Top 100)	28
Irish Albums (IRMA)	55
Italian Albums (FIMI)	12
Japanese Albums (Oricon)	18
Norwegian Albums (VG-lista)	18
Scottish Albums (Official Charts)	28
Spanish Albums (Promusicae)	74
Swedish Albums (Sverigetopplistan)	13
Swiss Albums (Schweizer Hitparade)	7
Taiwanese Albums (Five Music)	16
UK Albums (Official Charts)	22
UK R&B Albums (Official Charts)	4
US Billboard 200	1
US Top R&B/Hip-Hop Albums (Billboard)	1

=== Year-end charts ===
2006 year-end chart performance for The Breakthrough
Chart (2006)	Position
Australian Urban Albums (ARIA)	15
Dutch Albums (Album Top 100)	40
French Albums (SNEP)	154
German Albums (Offizielle Top 100)	83
Swedish Albums (Sverigetopplistan)	32
Swiss Albums (Schweizer Hitparade)	21
UK Albums (OCC)	107
US Billboard 200	5
US Top R&B/Hip-Hop Albums (Billboard)	1

2007 year-end chart performance for The Breakthrough
Chart (2007)	Position
Australian Urban Albums (ARIA)	46
US Billboard 200	181
US Top R&B/Hip-Hop Albums (Billboard)	63

=== Decade-end charts ===
Decade-end chart performance for The Breakthrough
Chart (2000–09)	Position
US Billboard 200	135

== Certifications ==
Certifications for The Breakthrough
Region	Certification	Certified units/sales
Australia (ARIA)	Gold	35,000^{^}
Germany (BVMI)	Gold	100,000^{‡}
Japan (RIAJ)	Gold	100,000^{^}
Switzerland (IFPI Switzerland)	Platinum	40,000^{^}
United Kingdom (BPI)	Gold	100,000^{^}
United States (RIAA)	3× Platinum	3,000,000^{^}
^{^} Shipments figures based on certification alone.^{‡} Sales+streaming figures based on certification alone.

== See also ==
- List of Billboard 200 number-one albums of 2006
- List of Billboard number-one R&B albums of 2006
