= MJB da MVP =

Single by Mary J. Blige featuring 50 Cent

from the album The Breakthrough and Reflections (A Retrospective)
- Released: April 18, 2005
- Length: 3:21
- Label: Geffen
- Songwriters: Mary J. Blige; Jayceon Taylor; Curtis Jackson; Ron Baker; Allan Felder; Norman Harris; Hame Johnson; Andre Lyon; Marcello Valenzano
- Producers: Mary J. Blige; Cool & Dre

Mary J. Blige singles chronology
"It's a Wrap" (2004)	"MJB da MVP" (2005)	"Be Without You" (2005)

50 Cent singles chronology
"Candy Shop" (2005)	"MJB da MVP" (2005)	"Just a Lil Bit" (2005)

"MJB da MVP" is a song by American recording artist Mary J. Blige featuring rapper 50 Cent, taken from her seventh studio album, The Breakthrough (2005). The Cool & Dre-produced track is a cover version of "Hate It or Love It" as performed by The Game and 50 Cent, the first of which also provided a new verse for the official remix of the song. In the new vocal part, Blige relates the ups and downs of her career and expresses thanks to Dr. Dre and The Game for letting her work on a track. She mentions her start in 1991, the release of her first five albums and her sadness by the death of her friend, R&B singer Aaliyah. The song contains elements from "Everybody Loves the Sunshine" by Roy Ayers.

Released as a promotional single, "MJB da MVP" was first played on US radio in 2005 and charted at number 75 on the Billboard Hot 100 based on airplay. In December 2006, one year after the song's initial airplay, the song was released in the United Kingdom as the lead single from her compilation album Reflections (A Retrospective). "MJB da MVP" was added to the playlist of UK radio station BBC Radio 1 on November 22, while the video for the single, a montage video, was released later that week. The single managed to chart at number 33 on the UK Singles Chart, where it became Blige's twenty-seventh top 40 entry.

== Track listings ==
UK CD & 12" Vinyl
No.	Title	Writer(s)	Producer(s)	Length
1.	"MJB Da MVP"	Mary J. Blige; Jayceon Taylor; Curtis Jackson; Ron Baker; Allan Felder; Norman Harris; Hame Johnson; Andre Lyon; Marcello Valenzano	Blige; Cool & Dre	4:11
2.	"Family Affair"	Blige; Bruce Miller; Andre R. Young; Camara Kambon; Michael Elizondo; Asiah Kewis; Luchana N. Lodge	Dr. Dre	4:25
3.	"Be Without You" (Moto Blanco vocal mix)	Blige; Bryan-Michael Cox; Jason Perry; Johntá Austin	Cox; Blige^{[a]}; Ron Fair^{[a]}; Young Smoke^{[b}; Moto Blanco^{[c]}	5:23

Notes

- ^{^[a]} signifies a vocal producer
- ^{^[b]} signifies an additional producer
- ^{^[c]} signifies a remix producer

Sample credits

- "MJB da MVP" contains excerpts from "Rubberband", written by Ron Baker, Allen Felder and Norman Harris and performed by the Tramps. It also contains resung lyrics from "All Night Long", written by James Johnson, "Remind Me", written by Patrice Rushen and Karen Evans, and "Everybody Loves the Sunshine", written by Roy Ayers.

== Charts ==
Weekly chart performance for "MJB da MVP"
Chart (2005)	Peak position
Ireland (IRMA)	49
Scottish Singles Sales (Official Charts)	45
UK Singles (Official Charts)	33
UK Hip Hop/R&B (Official Charts)	7
US Billboard Hot 100	75
US Hot R&B/Hip-Hop Songs (Billboard)	19
