= Take Me as I Am (Mary J. Blige song) =

Single by Mary J. Blige

from the album The Breakthrough
- Released: August 17, 2006
- Length: 3:57
- Label: Geffen
- Songwriters: Jordan Suecof; Lonnie Liston Smith; Ezekiel Lewis; Candice Nelson; Keri Hilson; Thabiso Nkhereanye
- Producers: Infinity; Ron Fair

Mary J. Blige singles chronology
"One" (2006)	"Take Me as I Am" (2006)	"We Ride (I See the Future)" (2006)

Music video
- "Take Me as I Am" on YouTube

"Take Me as I Am" is a song by American singer Mary J. Blige. It was written by Jordan "Infinity" Suecof and Thabiso "Tab" Nkhereanye along with three members of the writing collective The Clutch, Ezekiel Lewis, Candice Nelson, and singer Keri Hilson, for her seventh studio album, The Breakthrough (2005). Production was helmed by Infinity and Ron Fair, with co-production from Tal Herzberg. The song contains samples from "Garden of Peace" (1979) by American jazz musician Lonnie Liston Smith. Due to the inclusion of the sample, he is also credited as songwriter.

An anthem self-acceptance anthem that finds Blige in relief from the pressures of others, "Take Me as I Am" is a tender piano ballad, which was released to generally positive reviews from music critics. Issued by Geffen Records as the album's fourth and final single, the song reached number three on the US Hot R&B/Hip-Hop Songs and became Blige's third number-one hit on the Billboard Adult R&B Songs chart. At the 2007 Soul Train Music Awards, it was nominated for Best R&B/Soul Single – Female. The following year, "Take Me as I Am" was awarded the ASCAP Rhythm and Soul Music Award.

== Background ==
"Take Me as I Am" was written by Ezekiel Lewis, Candice Nelson, Keri Hilson, Jordan "Infinity" Suecof and Thabiso Nkhereany for Blige's seventh studio album, The Breakthrough (2005). Production was overseen by Suecof and frequent Blige contributor Ron Fair, while co-production came from Tal Herzberg. The song contains a sample from the song "Garden of Peace" (1979) by American jazz musician Lonnie Liston Smith who is also credited as songwriter. "Take Me as I Am" was conceived during a writing camp session in Miami, set up by Sony Music A&R Kawan Prather, during which Nelson, Hilson, and Lewis would connect on a creative level, prompting them to form The Clutch songwriting collective along with Balewa Muhammad and Patrick "J. Que" Smith. A demo of the song was recorded by Nelson. In 2015, Lewis ranked the song among his favorite The Clutch tracks, telling YouKnowIGotSoul: "I really love “Take Me As I Am” for how we really channeled Mary and executed."

== Critical reception ==
The song earned generally positive reviews from music critics. Billboard described "Take Me as I Am" as "striking in simplicity and sincerity" and remarked that it finds Blige "admonishing her critics and embracing her rocky musical journey." Fellow Billboard critic Nerisha Penrose found that on "Take Me As I Am," the "singer’s resilience is stronger than ever before. She sings about all the hardships she’s endured and gives her listeners an ultimatum [...] It’s an empowering anthem that teaches self-love and acceptance despite the personal opinions detractors may try to pass off." Da'Shan Smith from uDiscoverMusic found that "Throughout the song, Blige switches from protagonist to observer and back again. It’s another tale of survival, but, this time around, Blige is singing from the bright side of the tunnel." Clover Hope, writing for Pitchfork, called the song a "plaintive ballad." In a retrospective review, Alexis Petridis from The Guardian wrote in 2022: "By the time of 2005’s The Breakthrough, Blige was a master at alchemising her troubles into potent material. "Take Me As I Am" is simultaneously laid-back and steely; the beat is harder than you might expect from a ballad, the lyrics defiant."

== Accolades ==
Awards and nominations for "Take Me as I Am"
Organization	Year	Category	Result	Ref.
ASCAP Rhythm and Soul Music Awards	2008	Award Winning R&B/Hip-Hop Songs	Won	
Soul Train Music Awards	2007	Best R&B/Soul Single – Female	Nominated	

== Commercial performance ==
Released as a single on August 17, 2006, "Take Me as I Am" debuted and at number 97 on the US Billboard Hot 100 in the week of October 7, 2006. It eventually peaked at number 58 in the week ending November 18, 2006. The song fared better on Billboard's Hot R&B/Hip-Hop Songs chart. It would remain 48 on the chart and became Blige's third consecutive single from The Breakthrough to reach the chart's top three, peaking at numbe three. In January 2007, "Take Me as I Am" also reached the top spot of the US Adult R&B Songs chart, becoming Blige's third number-one hit on the chart. Billboard eventually ranked it sixth on its Adult R&B Songs year-end chart of 2007.

== Music video ==
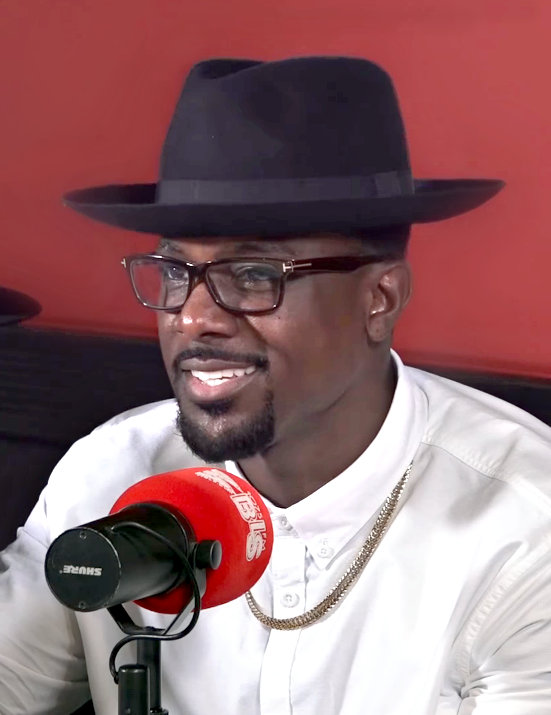
Actor Lance Gross appears in the video.

The music video for "Take Me as I Am" was directed by Bille Woodruff and filmed in July 2006. In the video, Blige portrays different women in different life situations except for her alter ego, Brook Lynn, who plays Date Mary. It uses an alternate version of the song that has a shorter instrumental intro, as well as a longer bridge after the second hook. An extended version of "Take Me as I Am" was used since Woodruff "needed more of the song to fit in all of the story." In a 2020 interview with Rated R&B he commented: "I had done a video of Mary for a song called "Your Child" where she played different people. So, she called me and once again, she wanted to have multiple personalities in the video. So, I came up with this concept but to fit everything in I needed some more. It was honestly, just because I needed more to make it more dramatic and to have the story land. So, I requested that because the other version wasn’t long enough and I needed more." The visuals premiered on BET's countdown show 106 & Park in September 2006.

As the video begins, Blige is a waitress/dishwasher getting her children ready for school and also trying to get her boyfriend / husband a job. Next, Blige is an editor during a photo shoot, in which a photographer is photographing Blige as a model. "Model Mary" is replaced with another model due to a tabloid report of a breakdown. "Editor Mary" is then sexually harassed by a corporate and walks out; while "model Mary" overdoses drugs in the bathroom of the photo shoot set, shortly after being replaced. In the restaurant which "Waitress Mary" works, Blige plays another character as well. This one is simply the girlfriend of a controlling boyfriend and is at lunch with her date. The date (Lance Gross) refuses to allow Blige to eat the appetizer bread, takes her menu from her and orders her a salad, clearly trying to personally control her weight. The date then gets up and appears to be flirting with a young woman in a pink dress. "Date Mary" (portrayed by Blige's alter ego, Brook Lynn) is checking her makeup and sees her date in the mirror reflection, then gets up and throws a glass of water in their faces, then leaves. Waitress Mary returns home after accidentally dropping food at work and kicks her lazy boyfriend out.

== Credits and personnel ==
Credits adapted from The Breakthrough liner notes.

- Mary J. Blige – vocal producer, vocal arrangements, vocals
- Mike Eleopolous – assistant recording engineer
- Ron Fair – music producer, vocal producer, vocal arrangements, string arrangements, strings conductor
- Tal Herzberg – co-producer, recording engineer
- Keri Hilson – vocal arrangements, songwriter
- Lonnie Liston Smith – songwriter (sample)
- Ezekiel Lewis – songwriter
- Jaycen Joshua – mixing assistant
- Candice Nelson – songwriter
- Thabiso Nkhereanye – songwriter
- Dave Pensado – audio mixing
- Allen Sides – strings recording engineer
- Jordan "Infinity" Suecof – music producer, songwriter

== Charts ==
=== Weekly charts ===
Weekly chart performance for "Take Me as I Am"
Chart (2006)	Peak position
US Billboard Hot 100	58
US Hot R&B/Hip-Hop Songs (Billboard)	3

=== Year-end charts ===
2006 year-end chart performance for "Take Me as I Am"
Chart (2006)	Position
US Hot R&B/Hip-Hop Songs (Billboard)	60

2007 year-end chart performance for "Take Me as I Am"
Chart (2007)	Position
US Hot R&B/Hip-Hop Songs (Billboard)	29
