= One (U2 song) =

1992 single by U2

Single by U2

from the album Achtung Baby
- B-side: "Lady with the Spinning Head (UV1)"
- Released: 24 February 1992
- Recorded: October 1990 – September 1991
- Studio: Hansa Ton (Berlin, Germany); Elsinore (Dalkey, Ireland); Windmill Lane (Dublin, Ireland)
- Genre: Rock
- Length: 4:36
- Label: Island
- Composer: U2
- Lyricist: Bono
- Producer: Daniel Lanois with Brian Eno

U2 singles chronology
"Mysterious Ways" (1991)	"One" (1992)	"Even Better Than the Real Thing" (1992)

Audio sample
- file; help

Music video
- "One" on YouTube

"One" is a song by Irish rock band U2. It is the third track from their seventh album, Achtung Baby (1991), and it was released as the record's third single on 24 February 1992. During the album's recording sessions at Hansa Studios in Berlin, conflict arose between the band members over the direction of U2's sound and the quality of their material. Tensions almost prompted the band to break up until they achieved a breakthrough with the improvisation of "One"; the song was written after the band members were inspired by a chord progression that guitarist the Edge was playing in the studio. The lyrics, written by lead singer Bono, were inspired by the band members' fractured relationships and the German reunification. Although the lyrics ostensibly describe "disunity", they have been interpreted in other ways.

"One" was released as a benefit single, with proceeds going towards AIDS research. The song topped the Irish Singles Charts, the Canadian RPM Top Singles chart and the US Billboard Album Rock Tracks and Modern Rock Tracks charts. It also peaked at number three in New Zealand, number four in Australia, number seven on the UK Singles Chart and numbers ten and three on the Billboard Hot 100 and Cash Box Top 100 respectively. In promotion of the song, the band filmed several music videos, although they were not pleased until a third was created.

The song was acclaimed by critics upon its release, and it has since been featured in polls as one of the greatest songs of all time. U2 has performed "One" at most of their tour concerts since the song's live debut in 1992, and it has appeared in many of the band's concert films. In a live setting, "One" is often used by the group to promote human rights or social justice causes, and the song lends its name to Bono's charitable organisation, the ONE Campaign. U2 re-recorded the song as part of a duet with R&B recording artist Mary J. Blige on her 2005 album The Breakthrough, and again for the band's 2023 album Songs of Surrender.

== Writing and recording ==
In October 1990, U2 arrived in Berlin on the eve of German reunification to begin the recording sessions for Achtung Baby at Hansa Studios. Expecting to be inspired by a "New Europe" and the reuniting city, the band instead found the mood to be bleak and soon conflict arose over their musical direction and the quality of their material. While bassist Adam Clayton and drummer Larry Mullen Jr. preferred a sound similar to U2's previous work, vocalist Bono and guitarist the Edge were inspired by European industrial and electronic dance music of the time and were advocating a change. The band also had difficulty developing demos and musical ideas into completed songs. Bono and the Edge believed the lack of progress was the fault of the band, while Clayton and Mullen believed the problem was the quality of the songs. Mullen said he "thought this might be the end" of the band.

"At the instant we were recording it, I got a very strong sense of its power. We were all playing together in the big recording room, a huge, eerie ballroom full of ghosts of the war, and everything fell into place. It was a reassuring moment, when everyone finally went, 'oh great, this album has started.' It's the reason you're in a band – when the spirit descends upon you and you create something truly affecting. 'One' is an incredibly moving piece. It hits straight into the heart."

— The Edge, on the recording of "One"

Ultimately, a breakthrough in the sessions was achieved. While jamming on a song called "Sick Puppy"—an early version of "Mysterious Ways"—the band tried different chord progressions for the bridge. The jam stopped and the Edge tried playing them alone on an acoustic guitar, as "everyone was trying to decide if they were any good." At the suggestion of producer Daniel Lanois, the Edge played two separate sections sequentially. The band liked the way it flowed and decided to play it together. Speaking of the improvisation, the Edge said, "suddenly something very powerful [was] happening in the room." He added, "Everyone recognized it was a special piece. It was like we'd caught a glimpse of what the song could be." Soon afterwards, the band had developed the piece of music into "One". Bono recalls that "the melody, the structure—the whole thing was done in 15 minutes". He also stated that the lyrics "just fell out of the sky, a gift"; the concept was inspired by the band members' fracturing relationships, the German reunification, and Bono's scepticism of the hippie idea of "oneness". Bono later sent a note to the Dalai Lama declining an invitation to a festival called Oneness, incorporating a line from the song: "One—but not the same". The song's writing inspired the band and changed their outlook on the recording sessions. Mullen said the song reaffirmed the band's "blank page approach" to recording and reassured the band that all was not lost.

"There was melancholy about it but there was also strength. One is not about oneness, it's about difference. It's not the old hippie idea of 'let's all live together.' It is a much more punk rock concept. It's anti-romantic: 'we are one but not the same. We get to carry each other.' It's a reminder that we have no choice. I'm still disappointed when people hear the chorus line as 'got to' rather than 'we get to carry each other.' Like it or not, the only way out of here is if I give you a leg up the wall and you pull me after you. There's something very unromantic about that.

— Bono, on the recording of "One"

Following the song's initial improvisation, tapes of the recording sessions were delivered to assisting producer Brian Eno to gather his input; Eno spent extended periods of time away from the sessions before visiting to review songs, and he believed that distancing himself from the work allowed him to provide the band with a fresh perspective on their material each time he rejoined them. The band were rather anxious about the quality of their material, but when Eno arrived in Berlin, they were surprised to hear that he liked most of the tapes. However, as Bono recalls, Eno said, "There's just one song I really despise, and that's 'One'." Eno felt that they needed to deconstruct the song.

The band returned to Dublin in 1991 to record at the "Elsinore" mansion on the Dalkey coastline. The band continued to work on the song there, adding various overdubs, but not finding a mix they were satisfied with. The Edge thought that they had the foundation for the song, but that it needed "foreground". Eno interceded, explaining to the group that "One" was among the sessions' tracks in which "The song has gone, whatever it is you liked about this song is not there anymore", and that the track had "disappeared under layers of overdubs". He created his own mix, which gave the band a better idea of an arrangement they liked. Eno wanted the band to remove the melancholy elements of the song and persuaded them to remove the acoustic guitar from the song. He also worked with Lanois and the Edge to "undermine the 'too beautiful' feeling", which is why they added the "crying guitar parts that have an aggression to them". While working with Lanois in the studio on a vocal overdub, Bono suggested Lanois "play a little guitar part to try and juice [him] up". Lanois subsequently took Bono's green Gretsch guitar and played a hammer-on part that was included in the final version of the song.

Flood, the sessions' engineer, was unconvinced by the song's mix, saying he "was the nagging doubter. I always felt it was a bit straight, until we did the final mix." The final mix was completed at Windmill Lane Studios in September 1991 on the last night of the album's recording sessions, when some last minute additions were made. Bono did not like a line in the vocals and spent most of the day re-recording it. Later, after the song's mix had just been completed by the production team, the Edge came up with a guitar part he wanted to add to the song's end near the lyric "Love is a temple". After convincing the production team to allow the addition, the Edge played the part once and had it mixed in ten minutes later.

== Composition ==
"One" is a rock ballad played in a 4/4 time signature at a tempo of 91 beats per minute. The verse follows a chord progression of Am–D^{5}–F^{maj7}–G while the chorus follows C–Am–F^{maj7}–C.

Bono described the song's theme as such: "It is a song about coming together, but it's not the old hippie idea of 'Let's all live together.' It is, in fact, the opposite. It's saying, We are one, but we're not the same. It's not saying we even want to get along, but that we have to get along together in this world if it is to survive. It's a reminder that we have no choice". The Edge described it on one level as a "bitter, twisted, vitriolic conversation between two people who've been through some nasty, heavy stuff". On another level, he suggested that the line "we get to carry each other" introduces "grace" to the song and that the wording "get to" (instead of "got to") is essential, as it suggests that it is a privilege to help one another, not an obligation. The band have been told by many fans that they played the song at their weddings, prompting Bono to respond, "Are you mad? It's about splitting up!" There was some speculation that the song described a conversation between a father and his HIV-positive gay son, based on the connection of the song to David Wojnarowicz, a gay artist who died of AIDS. In 2005, Bono said "It's a father-and-son story. I tried to write about someone I knew who was coming out and was afraid to tell his father. It's a religious father and son."

== Release ==
"One" was released as the album's third single on 24 February 1992 as a benefit single, with all of the band's royalties being donated to different AIDS research organisations for each country in which the single was released. The group's manager Paul McGuinness commented on their decision: "The band feels that [AIDS] is the most pressing issue of the day, and we really have to focus people's attention to the AIDS plague that has been with us for 10 years." To promote safe sex, U2 sold condoms bearing the album title Achtung Baby at their Zoo TV Tour concerts. The cover of the single release is a photograph by David Wojnarowicz. The photograph depicts buffaloes falling off a cliff after being chased by Native American hunters. The single's liner notes explain that Wojnarowicz "identifies himself and ourselves with the buffalo, pushed into the unknown by forces we cannot control or even understand".

The single reached number seven on the UK Singles Chart, number ten on the US Billboard Hot 100, number three on the US Cash Box Top 100, and number one on the US Album Rock Tracks and Modern Rock Tracks charts.

== Music videos ==
Three music videos were created for "One". The first, directed by Anton Corbijn, was filmed in Berlin and features the band members performing at Hansa Studios interspersed with footage of Trabants (an East German automobile they became fond of as a symbol for a changing Europe) and shots of them dressed in drag. Bono explained that the idea to crossdress "had been based on the idea that if U2 can't do this, we've got to do it!", and it was fostered by the group's experiences dressing in drag for the Carnival of Santa Cruz de Tenerife. However, the band pulled the video, fearing the single's status as an AIDS benefit would result in critics finding AIDS-related interpretations of the video. The Edge explained, "We didn't want to be involved in putting back the AIDS issue into the realm of sexuality... It wasn't worth the risk of people imagining we were saying something about the AIDS issue through the drag footage, which was totally not what we were trying to say."

The second video was directed by Mark Pellington. It comprises images of blooming flowers, the title word in several languages, and slow-motion footage of buffaloes running, leading up to Wojnarowicz's "Falling Buffalo" photograph. Much like for the first video, the band did not believe Pellington's video would be good for promoting the single.

The group filmed a third video in an attempt to appeal to a broader audience. It was directed by Rattle and Hum director Phil Joanou and was primarily filmed in early March 1992 at Nell's, a Manhattan nightclub. The video depicts Bono sitting at a table smoking a cheroot and drinking beer, interspersed with footage of the band performing in concert. While Bono was filmed, the rest of the band, along with models and transgender women, attended a party in the basement, awaiting their turns to be filmed. However, they were never called to the set and by 3 a.m., they realised that the video was to focus on Bono.

== Reception ==
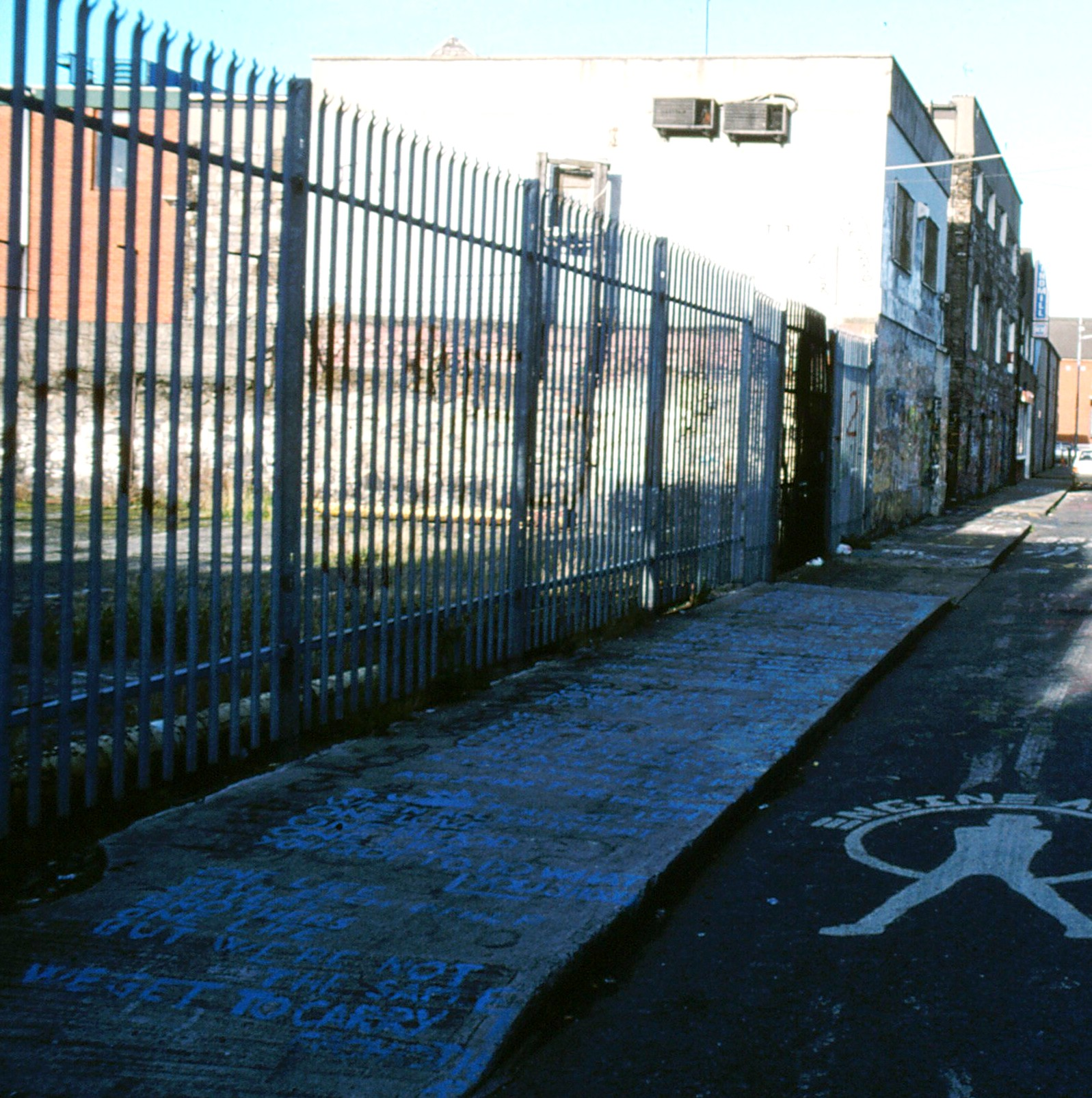
In 1994, a fan wrote the song's lyrics on the pavement leading up to Windmill Lane Studios in blue chalk.

After the release of Achtung Baby, critics praised "One". In its review of the album, Entertainment Weekly called the song "biting and unprecedentedly emotional" and opined that its "extravagant stylings and wild emotings [...] put it among Bono's most dramatic moments on record". Dave Jennings from Melody Maker viewed it as a "solemn ballad", "redeemed by some intriguing lyrical imagery." In its review of the album, Rolling Stone called the song a "radiant ballad", noting that "Few bands can marshal such sublime power, but it's just one of the many moments on Achtung Baby when we're reminded why, before these guys were the butt of cynical jokes, they were rock & roll heroes—as they still are."

Niall Stokes of Hot Press gave an enthusiastic review of the song, calling it one of the album's tracks "whose potency defies equivocations". Stokes said the song, both upon initial and repeated listens, "seems transcendent, a magnificent synthesis of elements, words and music, rhythm, instrumentation arrangement and intonation combine to create something that speaks a language beyond logic, the definitive language of emotional truth". He said the melody was reminiscent of Led Zeppelin and the vocals evoked memories of Al Green and the Rolling Stones circa "Sympathy for the Devil". Stokes could not single out what made the song so "utterly inspirational", but said it was "soul music that avoids the obvious cliches of the genre and cuts to the core".

Q called Bono's singing on the song a "quieter moment" that has "never been so persuasively tender". The Chicago Tribune wrote that the song "builds with the stately grandeur of a Roy Orbison ballad" and that Bono's lyric "We're one / But we're not the same" is one of "pithiest insights yet about the contradiction of marriage". The Orlando Sentinel called the track "sorrowful" and compared it to music by the Rolling Stones. Robert Hilburn of the Los Angeles Times called the "disillusioned" track one of the album's high points. Denise Sullivan of Allmusic wrote that the song was "among U2's finest recordings", and she praised its "lyrical simplicity, heart-rending vocal delivery, and evocative instrumentation". She called the Edge's guitar playing "unusually warm and soulful". In the 1992 Pazz & Jop critics' poll in The Village Voice, "One" placed at number eight on the "Best Single" list.

In 1992, Axl Rose told RIP magazine: "I think their song 'One' is one of the greatest songs ever written. Now I can see and understand why people were into U2 years ago."

== Live performances ==
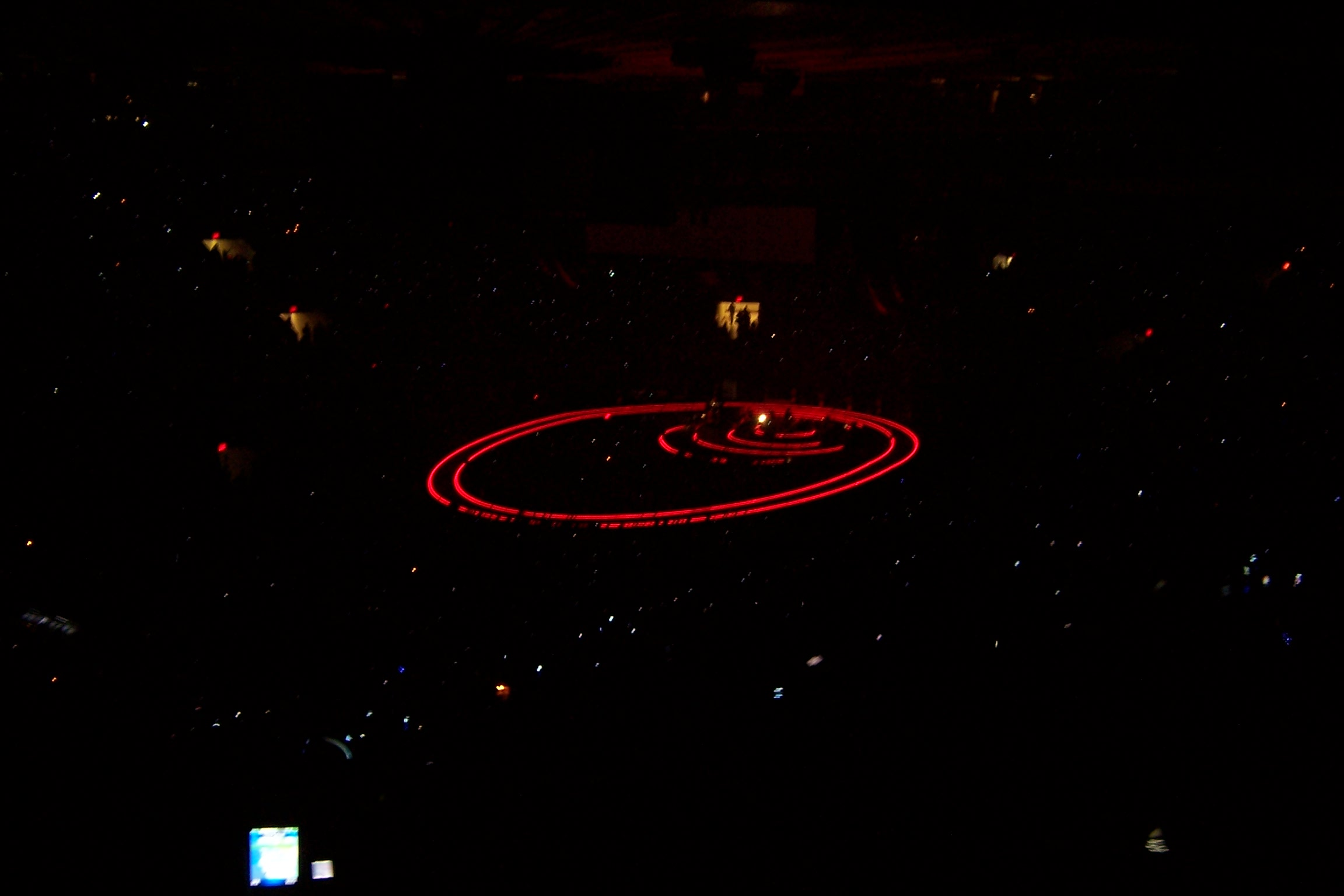
Cellphones open as "One" is performed on the Vertigo Tour, Madison Square Garden, 14 October 2005.

"One" made its live debut on 29 February 1992 in Lakeland, Florida on the opening night of the Zoo TV Tour, and it was played at every subsequent show on U2's concert tours until the first show of the Innocence + Experience Tour in Vancouver, where it was not played for the first time in its history. However, the song returned for the following concert, when it was used as the show closer. Zoo TV performances were accompanied by footage from the second music video being displayed on the stage's video screens, with David Wojnarowicz's "Falling Buffalo" photograph appearing at the end of the song.

The song took on an even more emotional meaning at a Popmart Tour show at Mexico City in 1997, as featured on PopMart: Live from Mexico City, where the tearful rendition was dedicated to Michael Hutchence of INXS. Until the second leg of the U2 360° Tour, "One" was played live in the key of A♭ minor, while the recorded version is played a semitone higher. Throughout its history, Bono has often sung the song with an extra verse generally known as "Hear Us Coming", whose lyrics are usually some variation of:

You hear us coming Lord?
You hear us call?
You hear us knocking, knocking at Your door?
You hear us coming, Lord?
You hear us call?
You hear us scratching, will You make me crawl?

It was a nearly-regular feature on the Zoo TV Tour, PopMart, and Elevation Tours, but was sung less often on the Vertigo Tour. The verse made a re-emergence on the 2009 legs of the U2 360° Tour; although it was not a nightly feature, Bono sang it very often, segueing into "Amazing Grace" and from there into "Where the Streets Have No Name" on most of the second leg. "One" has also been played at several benefit concerts, including the 1995 Pavarotti and Friends concert in Modena, the 1997 Tibetan Freedom Concert in New York, the 2003 46664 concert, at Live 8 in 2005, and with Mary J. Blige on Shelter from the Storm: A Concert for the Gulf Coast.

Live performances of the song are also depicted in the concert films Zoo TV: Live from Sydney, U2 Go Home: Live from Slane Castle, Vertigo 2005: Live from Chicago, U2 3D, and U2 360° at the Rose Bowl.

== Legacy ==
"'One' [...] is certainly a breakup song. But it's also very much about the duty to stay together, about finding some kind of connection in times of war, fragmentation, plague, poverty and cultural difference. About being too cynical to believe in the hippie version of global oneness, but too much of a believer to reject it."

— Blender

"One" has frequently appeared on lists of the greatest songs. In 2004, Rolling Stone placed the song at number 36 on its list of the "500 Greatest Songs of All Time", making it the highest-ranked U2 song; it remained in that position on the magazine's 2010 version of the list, but was re-ranked to 62nd on the 2021 version. In 2003, a special edition issue of Q, titled "1001 Best Songs Ever", named "One" the greatest song of all-time. VH1 ranked the song second on its list of "Greatest Songs of the 90s", and voters in an April 2006 poll on VH1 named the song as having the UK's number-one lyric: "One life, with each other, sisters, brothers". In 2005, Blender ranked the song at number four on its list of "The 500 Greatest Songs Since You Were Born". The following year, readers of Q voted "One" the fifth-greatest song in history. The song subsequently appeared as one of seven U2 songs in the 2006 music reference book 1001 Songs: The Great Songs of All Time and the Artists, Stories, and Secrets. It is included in the Rock and Roll Hall of Fame's 500 Songs that Shaped Rock and Roll.

On 31 December 2006, "One" was announced by BBC Radio 1 to be the thirty-fifth highest-selling single of 2006 in the UK. The collaboration was also nominated for the Grammy Award for Best Pop Collaboration with Vocals in December 2006.

In late 2006, a Bank of America employee sang "One" with lyrics modified to refer to the Bank of America and MBNA merger. The video subsequently became an Internet phenomenon. Universal Music Group, the copyright owner of the song, posted a cease and desist letter directed at Bank of America in the comments section of Stereogum, one of the blogs that posted the video.

In 2023, an alternate version of the song was released as the second single from the album Songs of Surrender.

== Track listings ==
The single was released on various formats including 7-inch, 12-inch, cassette, and CD. All releases featured a new song "Lady with the Spinning Head (UV1)" as a B-side track. This version was later included in the 20th anniversary release of Achtung Baby, whereas an extended 'dance' remix was included on the double album version of The Best of 1990–2000. Some releases also included "Satellite of Love" or both "Satellite of Love" and the "Night and Day" remix.

No.	Title	Lyrics	Music	Producer	Length
1.	"One"	Bono	U2	Daniel Lanois; Brian Eno	4:36
2.	"Lady with the Spinning Head (UV1)"	Bono	U2	Paul Barrett	3:54
3.	"Satellite of Love"	Lou Reed	Reed	The Edge and Barrett	4:00
4.	"Night and Day" (Steel String remix)	Cole Porter	Porter	The Edge and Barrett	7:00

== Credits and personnel ==
U2

- Bono – vocals
- The Edge – guitar, keyboards
- Adam Clayton – bass guitar
- Larry Mullen Jr. – drums, percussion

Additional performers

- Brian Eno – additional keyboards
- Daniel Lanois – additional guitar

Technical

- Production – Daniel Lanois with Brian Eno
- Engineering – Flood
- Additional engineering – Robbie Adams
- Engineering assistance – Shannon Strong
- Mixing – Flood
- Mixing assistance – Shannon Strong

== Charts ==
=== Weekly charts ===
Weekly chart performance for "One" by U2
Chart (1992)	Peak position
Australia (ARIA)	4
Belgium (Ultratop 50 Flanders)	26
Canada (The Record)	3
Canada Top Singles (RPM)	1
Europe (Eurochart Hot 100)	16
France (SNEP)	13
Germany (GfK)	50
Ireland (IRMA)	1
Italy (Musica e dischi)	2
Netherlands (Dutch Top 40)	11
Netherlands (Single Top 100)	12
New Zealand (Recorded Music NZ)	3
Portugal (AFP)	3
Switzerland (Schweizer Hitparade)	25
UK Singles (Official Charts)	7
UK Airplay (Music Week)	5
US Billboard Hot 100	10
US Adult Contemporary (Billboard)	24
US Alternative Airplay (Billboard)	1
US Dance Singles Sales (Billboard)	44
US Mainstream Rock Airplay (Billboard)	1
US Cash Box Top 100	3

Chart (2015)	Peak position
Poland Airplay (ZPAV)	97

Chart (2019)	Peak position
Japan Hot 100 (Billboard)	78

2025 weekly chart performance for "One"
Chart (2025)	Peak position
Israel International Airplay (Media Forest)	16

=== Year-end charts ===
Year-end chart performance for "One" by U2
Chart (1992)	Position
Australia (ARIA)	91
Canada Top Singles (RPM)	6
Europe (Eurochart Hot 100)	76
Netherlands (Single Top 100)	94
US Billboard Hot 100	60
US Album Rock Tracks (Billboard)	7
US Modern Rock Tracks (Billboard)	1
US Cash Box Top 100	46

Chart (2001)	Position
Canada (Nielsen SoundScan)	117

Chart (2002)	Position
Canada (Nielsen SoundScan)	146

== Certifications ==
Certifications and sales for "One" by U2
Region	Certification	Certified units/sales
Austria (IFPI Austria)	Gold	25,000^{*}
Brazil (Pro-Música Brasil)	Gold	30,000^{‡}
Denmark (IFPI Danmark)	Platinum	90,000^{‡}
Italy (FIMI) sales since 2009	2× Platinum	200,000^{‡}
New Zealand (RMNZ)	2× Platinum	60,000^{‡}
Spain (Promusicae)	Platinum	60,000^{‡}
United Kingdom (BPI)	Platinum	600,000^{‡}
^{*} Sales figures based on certification alone.^{‡} Sales+streaming figures based on certification alone.

== Mica Paris version ==
"One"

Single by Mica Paris
- Released: 27 March 1995
- Length: 4:36
- Label: Chrysalis; Cooltempo
- Composer: U2
- Lyricist: Bono
- Producers: Mike Peden; Paul Oakenfold; Steve Osborne; Ethnic Boyz

Mica Paris singles chronology
"Whisper a Prayer" (1993)	"One" (1995)	"Stay" (1998)

Music video
- "One" (Perfecto 7") on YouTube

British soul singer Mica Paris released a cover of "One" in 1995. Released on 27 March 1995, by Chrysalis and Cooltempo, her version debuted and peaked at number 29 on the UK Singles Chart on the week ending 8 April 1995. It spent a total of four weeks on the chart.

=== Critical reception ===
Pan-European magazine Music & Media wrote, "Thanks to Mica's urbane dance touch, people everywhere–from London to Rome, Tokyo, New York and back to Paris–will dance to a U2 song in other surroundings than Zooroparenas." Piccadilly radio/Manchester music coordinator Christian Smith said it's a "brilliant track", adding, "Since it starts of really slow, I wouldn't be surprised if a lot of radio programmers have a hard time getting into it. But the fact that it's such a well-known track will certainly help."

=== Track listing ===
CD single

No.	Title	Lyrics	Producer	Length
1.	"One" (Perfecto 7")	Bono	Paul Oakenfold; Steve Osborne	4:30
2.	"One" (Original Mix)	Bono	Mike Peden	4:37
3.	"One" (Perfecto Mix)	Bono	Paul Oakenfold; Steve Osborne	5:59
4.	"One" (Ethnic Boyz Mix)	Bono	Ethnic Boyz	5:01
5.	"One" (Perfecto Dub)	Bono	Paul Oakenfold; Steve Osborne	7:48

Vinyl

Side one
No.	Title	Lyrics	Producer	Length
1.	"One" (Perfecto Mix)	Bono	Paul Oakenfold; Steve Osborne	4:30
2.	"One" (Original Mix)	Bono	Mike Peden	4:37

Side two
No.	Title	Lyrics	Producer	Length
1.	"One" (Ethnic Boyz Mix)	Bono	Ethnic Boyz	5:01
2.	"One" (Perfecto Dub)	Bono	Paul Oakenfold; Steve Osborne	7:48

=== Credits and personnel ===
Performers

- Mica Paris – vocals

Managerial

- Executive producer – Ken Grunbaum

Technical and Production

- Production – Mike Peden (track 2), Paul Oakenfold and Steve Osbourne (tracks 1,3 and 5), Ethic Boyz (track 4)
- Engineering – Paul 'Max' Bloom
- Programming – Ollie Dagois

Visuals and Imagery

- Photography – Daniela Federici
- Image and style – Jamie Rose

=== Charts ===
Chart (1995)	Peak position
Australia (ARIA)	104
Australia (Australian Music Report)	89
New Zealand (Recorded Music NZ)	50
Scottish Singles Sales (Official Charts)	26
UK Singles (Official Charts)	29
UK Hip Hop/R&B (Official Charts)	5
UK Club Chart (Music Week)	35
UK Pop Tip Club Chart (Music Week)	26

== Mary J. Blige and U2 version ==
"One"

Single by Mary J. Blige and U2

from the album The Breakthrough
- Released: 3 April 2006
- Length: 4:21
- Label: Geffen
- Composer: U2
- Lyricist: Bono
- Producers: Ron Fair; Tal Herzberg

Mary J. Blige singles chronology
"Enough Cryin" (2006)	"One" (2006)	"Take Me as I Am" (2006)

U2 singles chronology
"Sgt. Pepper's Lonely Hearts Club Band" (2005)	"One" (2006)	"The Saints Are Coming" (2006)

Music video
- "One" on YouTube

American singer Mary J. Blige covered "One" for her seventh studio album, The Breakthrough, with U2 and released it as the second international single from the album. After being invited to join the group on stage at their New York gig in 2005, Blige performed the track with U2 and received a standing ovation. The song was then recorded featuring Blige on lead vocals, with Bono supplying additional vocals and the band performing the music. It was released on 3 April 2006, having already been featured heavily on BBC Radio 1's playlist, and has been a staple record on Capital FM's playlist since late January.

=== Chart performance ===
The song was a major commercial success in Europe, reaching number two in Ireland, Italy, Switzerland and the United Kingdom and topping the Norwegian Singles Chart for six weeks. The cover also reached number one in Austria for a week and reached the top 10 in several other European countries.

=== Live performances ===
In May 2006, Blige performed the song at the finale of American Idol with finalist Elliott Yamin, ahead of its full release to American radio. It was also used by ABC for its end-of-season montage after the 2006 FIFA World Cup final and Fox for its end-of-season montage after game five of the 2006 World Series.

=== Track listing ===
CD single

CD 01
No.	Title	Lyrics	Length
1.	"One" (radio edit)	Bono	4:04
2.	"Can't Hide From Luv" (live)		3:52

CD 02
No.	Title	Lyrics	Length
1.	"One" (radio edit)	Bono	4:04
2.	"I'm Goin' Down" (Live at the Cipriani Wall Street Concert Series)		3:24
3.	"My Life '05"		3:24

=== Credits ===
- Written by Bono, Adam Clayton, The Edge, Larry Mullen Jr
- Produced by Ron Fair
- Co-producered by Tal Herzberg
- Lead vocals performed by Mary J Blige
- Additional vocals and rhythm guitar performed by Bono
- Lead guitar performed by The Edge
- Bass performed by Adam Clayton
- Drums and percussion performed by Larry Mullen Jr
- Strings arranged and conducted by Ron Fair
- Piano and organ performed by Ron Fair
- Additional electric and acoustic guitar performed by John Goux
- Mixed by Jack Joseph
- Executive producer: Mary J. Blige

=== Charts ===
==== Weekly charts ====
Weekly chart performance for the Mary J. Blige remix
Chart (2006)	Peak position
Australia (ARIA)	118
Australia Digital Tracks (ARIA)	6
Austria (Ö3 Austria Top 40)	1
Belgium (Ultratop 50 Flanders)	6
Belgium (Ultratop 50 Wallonia)	10
CIS Airplay (TopHit)	163
Czech Republic Airplay (ČNS IFPI)	28
Denmark (Tracklisten)	7
Europe (Eurochart Hot 100)	4
France (SNEP)	35
Germany (GfK)	6
Hungary (Rádiós Top 40)	10
Ireland (IRMA)	2
Italy (FIMI)	2
Italy (Musica e Dischi)	3
Netherlands (Dutch Top 40)	2
Netherlands (Mega Top 50)	2
Netherlands (Single Top 100)	3
Norway (VG-lista)	1
Scottish Singles Sales (Official Charts)	3
Sweden (Sverigetopplistan)	27
Switzerland (Schweizer Hitparade)	2
UK Singles (Official Charts)	2
UK R&B (OCC)	2
US Billboard Hot 100	86
US Adult Contemporary (Billboard)	36
US Adult Pop Airplay (Billboard)	37

==== Year-end charts ====
Annual chart rankings for the Mary J. Blige remix
Chart (2006)	Position
Australia Digital Tracks (ARIA)	27
Austria (Ö3 Austria Top 40)	10
Belgium (Ultratop 50 Flanders)	16
Belgium (Ultratop 50 Wallonia)	35
Europe (Eurochart Hot 100)	23
Germany (Media Control GfK)	24
Ireland (IRMA)	15
Italy (FIMI)	28
Netherlands (Dutch Top 40)	6
Netherlands (Single Top 100)	11
Switzerland (Schweizer Hitparade)	11
UK Singles (OCC)	35

=== All-time charts ===
All-time chart rankings for the Mary J. Blige remix
Chart	Rank
Dutch Love Songs (Dutch Top 40)	22

=== Certifications ===
Region	Certification	Certified units/sales
Germany (BVMI)	Platinum	300,000^{‡}
Denmark (IFPI Danmark)	Platinum	8,000^{^}
Italy (FIMI)	Gold	10,000^{*}
Sweden (GLF)	Gold	10,000^{^}
United Kingdom (BPI)	Silver	200,000^{^}
^{*} Sales figures based on certification alone.^{^} Shipments figures based on certification alone.^{‡} Sales+streaming figures based on certification alone.

== Other covers ==
"One" has been covered by numerous other artists, including Damien Rice, Johnny Logan, Johnny Cash, Adam Lambert, Howie Day, Joe Cocker, Warren Haynes, R.E.M., Gregorian, Pearl Jam, Fontaines D.C., Kendall Payne, Shinedown, Vanessa Paradis & Alain Lanty, Cowboy Junkies, Quebec pop singer Marie Carmen and the cast of the television series Glee.

Members of R.E.M. and U2 played an acoustic version of the song during a 1993 MTV concert for then newly inaugurated U.S. president Bill Clinton. They performed under the name "Automatic Baby", a reference to each of their parent bands' recent albums Automatic for the People and Achtung Baby. In 1997, this version of "One" reached number one in Iceland and ended the year as the country's 12th-most successful single.

Damien Rice reworked the song for the 2011 tribute album AHK-toong BAY-bi Covered. "I remember seeing the queues on Dublin's Grafton Street: people waiting, sleeping, for the first copies of the new U2 record, as if some famine had hit the soul of the music world," he remarked. "Two decades later, I busked for the homeless with Bono on the same street. We played 'One' and Bono appeared to forget the words, but I didn't – they were as clear to me as the Our Father. Seventeen (Rice's age when Achtung Baby was issued) is such a powerful age, and 'One' is such a powerful song."

Chris Cornell performed in his concerts a version of "One" with the lyrics of the Metallica song also called "One", which he explained as the result of searching for U2's lyrics after getting the guitar tabs and ending up with Metallica.

== See also ==
- List of covers of U2 songs – One
- List of number-one singles of 1992 (Ireland)
- List of RPM number-one singles of 1992
- List of number-one mainstream rock hits (United States)
- List of number-one hits of 2006 (Austria)
- List of number-one songs in Norway
- Number one modern rock hits of 1992
