= Be Without You =

2005 single by Mary J. Blige

Single by Mary J. Blige

from the album The Breakthrough
- Released: November 14, 2005
- Studio: Chalice (Los Angeles)
- Genre: R&B; hip hop soul
- Length: 4:09
- Label: Matriarch; Geffen
- Songwriters: Mary J. Blige; Johntá Austin; Bryan-Michael Cox; Jason Perry
- Producers: Cox (Music), Young Smoke (Music), Blige (Vocals), Ron Fair (Vocals)

Mary J. Blige singles chronology
"MJB da MVP" (2005)	"Be Without You" (2005)	"Enough Cryin" (2006)

Music video
- "Be Without You" on YouTube

"Be Without You" is a song by American recording artist Mary J. Blige. It was written by Johntá Austin, Bryan Michael Cox, Jason Perry, and Blige for her seventh studio album, The Breakthrough (2005). Production was helmed by Cox, with additional production from Young Smoke and vocal production from Ron Fair and Blige. A piano-tinkling downtempo R&B song, the song examines a relationship where the couple is trying to decide if they want to stay together, with Blige urging them to appreciate their blessings. "Be Without You" was released as the album's first official single on November 14, 2005.

Ranking among the most played songs on US radio in the year 2006, it was certified double-platinum by the Recording Industry Association of America (RIAA) in 2007. In March 2017, Billboard ranked "Be Without You" as the most successful R&B/Hip-Hop Song of all time. "Be Without You" is also one of Mary J. Blige's most successful singles to date, peaking at number three on the Billboard Hot 100. It was nominated for Record of the Year and Song of the Year and won the Best R&B Song and Best Female R&B Vocal Performance categories at the 2007 Grammy Awards.

== Background ==
"Be Without You"
Mary J. Blige's "Be Without You" from The Breakthrough

"Be Without You" is a contemporary R&B and hip hop soul song written in the key of D minor with a tempo of 73 beats per minute. The song follows a chord progression of Dm – B♭maj7 – C – Dm – Gm7 – C – A7, and Blige's vocals span from F_{3} to D_{5}. It was co-written by Blige along with Bryan-Michael Cox, Jason Perry and Johnta Austin, and co-produced by Cox and Young Smoke. Cox, along with Young Smoke and Ron Fair, played multiple instruments. Fair also did the vocal arrangements and string arrangements. Additionally, the song features three engineers and was mixed by David Pensado. Cox commented on the production of "Be Without You": "I did the whole track and Jason co-composed the bridge with me, and Johnta wrote the lyrics and the melody. Mary came in and she and I tweaked some of the lines and tightened the record up lyrically to fit her. We threw ideas around, we talked about the track and we came up with concepts."

== Critical reception ==
"Be Without You" received critical acclaim. Pitchfork's Clover Hope found that on "Be Without You," Blige "is practically levitating. It’s a stunning vocal showcase amid a litany of lyrical vows that capture the ecstasy of the honeymoon phase," while Alexis Petridis from The Guardian called it a "wonderful song: luscious, dramatic, with Blige bringing her patent edge." Billboard described the song a "tale of real love" and called it "signature Blige," with Thomas Inskeep, writing for Stylus Magazine, calling the song a "slammer of a single, a midtempo love song that gets all the hands in the air (lighters-cum-cell phones, too)." The Sun Sentinel wrote: On "Be Without You, "Blige pours out all her emotion as she talks about the feeling of being with that person you cannot live without.

Antwane Folk from Rated R&B noted that "this power ballad hears Blige inarguably in love, proving her commitment to her man in an arresting singing style that made you believe every word." Da'Shan Smith from uDiscoverMusic found that the song "remains one her most powerful performances, with vocal runs for days before she brings it home towards the end." Tareck Ghoneim from Contactmusic.com found that "Be Without You" continues "to show Blige's unique, soulful and powerful singing style with the all the pain of a sensitive diva that we've become used to with her [...] Blige at this point in her career could easily turn cheesy and cater to a pop market. However even though this track doesn't quite have the youthful exuberance of What's the 411?, it still has the angst and quality of a lady who is still striving and most definitely has her name carved in the music hall of fame." BET.com wrote of the song: "With a beautiful piano melody and Mary in top-notch, gut-wrenching form, it's easy to see why this is one of the biggest songs of Mary's legendary career."

== Accolades ==
Awards and nominations for "Be Without You"
Organization	Year	Category	Result	Ref.
ASCAP Pop Awards	2007	Pop Music Award	Won	
ASCAP Pop Awards	2007	Song of the Year	Won	
BET Awards	2006	Video of the Year	Won	
Billboard Awards	2006	Hot 100 Airplay of the Year	Won	
Billboard Awards	2006	Hot 100 Airplay of the Year	Won	
Billboard Awards	2006	R&B/Hip-Hop Song Airplay of the Year	Won	
Billboard Awards	2006	R&B/Hip-Hop Song of the Year	Won	
Grammy Awards	2007	Best R&B Song	Won	
Grammy Awards	2007	Best Female R&B Vocal Performance	Won	
Grammy Awards	2007	Song of the Year	Nominated	
Grammy Awards	2007	Record of the Year	Nominated	
International Dance Music Awards	2007	Best R&B/Urban Dance Track	Won	
MOBO Awards	2006	Best Song	Nominated	
MTV Video Music Awards	2006	Best R&B Video	Nominated	
NAACP Image Awards	2007	Outstanding Music Video	Won	

== Chart performance ==
The single debuted at number 93 on the Billboard Hot 100 and peaked at number three in February 2006, Blige's third highest peak of her career after 2001's "Family Affair" and 1996's "Not Gon' Cry." Moreover, the song became the most successful release in the history of the Hot R&B/Hip-Hop Songs chart (until 2013) when it spent a record 15 consecutive weeks at number one. "Be Without You" topped the U.S. Billboard Hot 100 Airplay chart for nine weeks, and the dance remix has also topped the U.S. Hot Dance Club Play chart. The song broke the record for the longest-running single in the existence of the Hot R&B/Hip-Hop Songs, where it spent a grand total of 75 weeks on that chart. After its run on the main R&B chart, it moved to the Recurrent R&B Airplay chart.

In the UK, the single only peaked at number 32 on the UK singles chart; however, with the Moto Blanco remix of the song becoming a large club hit in the UK, the song actually managed to hold (to that time) the record for the most weeks on the UK top 75 for a Mary J. Blige single (18 in total). Having proved very popular, the Moto Blanco remix was featured as a B-side in the UK on subsequent singles "MJB Da MVP" and "Enough Cryin'."

== Music video ==
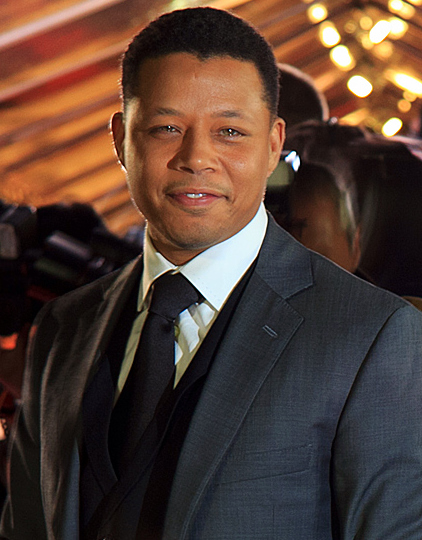
Actor Terrence Howard co-stars as Blige's boyfriend in the video.

Blige reteamed with Matthew Rolston, director of the visuals for her 1995 single "I'm Going Down," to film a music video for "Be Without You." Though set in New York City, it was largely filmed in Los Angeles on November 8, 2005, with much of the scenes shot in a home originally owned by entertainer Frank Sinatra. Actor Terrence Howard, fresh from the success of the drama film Hustle & Flow (2005), was consulted to portray Blige's love interest in the video.

"Be Without You" first aired on November 28, 2005. It peaked on AOL Videos Top 11 on the tenth spot on the January 21, 2006, entering the chart the first time and also the LAUNCH Music Videos Top 100 at the sixth position the same week. There's also a "Live At Launch Exclusive Performance" available for download from January 2006, which peaked seventieth on the same chart. The music video won in the Video of the Year category at the 2006 BET Awards as well as the award for Outstanding Music Video at the 38th NAACP Image Awards. In addition, "Be Without You" was nominated for Best R&B Video at the 2006 MTV Video Music Awards.

=== Synopsis ===
The video begins with a black and white cityscape with Blige standing on top of a building as the song starts playing. Then, the video shifts into a bathroom scene with Blige cleaning out her medicine cabinet. In the first scene, Blige is typing the lyrics on her laptop. The next scene shown in color appears with Blige falling in love with her boyfriend and sleeping with him. Then, the next scene takes place in a kitchen where Blige and her love interest are celebrating dinner with her family. Meanwhile, she is seen in a color scene standing next to a group of candles with the next scene showing her at a red carpet premiere walking out of a limo. Then, Blige and her boyfriend break up after having a fight (as seen in the events at the beginning of the video). After 2 candles begin to melt, the final scene in black and white changes to color with a knock on Blige's door. She opens the door to find her boyfriend on the other side. They embrace at the close of the song.

== Remixes ==
The official remix was also produced by Bryan-Michael Cox and features former Shady Records rapper Stat Quo.

== Track listings ==
UK CD single
No.	Title	Writer(s)	Producer(s)	Length
1.	"Be Without You" (Kendu Mix)	Mary J. Blige; Johntá Austin; Bryan-Michael Cox; Jason Perry	Cox; Young Smoke^{[a]}; Blige^{[b]}; Ron Fair^{[b]}	4:10
2.	"Be Without You" (Moto Blanco Vocal Mix)	Blige; Austin; Cox; Perry	Cox; Young Smoke^{[a]}; Blige^{[b]}; Ron Fair^{[b]}; Moto Blanco^{[c]}	4:31

US CD single
No.	Title	Writer(s)	Producer(s)	Length
1.	"Be Without You" (Kendu Mix)	Blige; Austin; Cox; Perry	Cox; Young Smoke^{[a]}; Blige^{[b]}; Fair^{[b]}	4:10
2.	"Show Love"	Blige; Sean Garrett; Chucky Thompson	Thompson	3:42
3.	"Be Without You" (Moto Blanco Vocal Mix)	Blige; Austin; Cox; Perry	Cox; Young Smoke^{[a]}; Blige^{[b]}; Ron Fair^{[b]}; Moto Blanco^{[c]}	4:31

Notes

- ^{^[a]} denotes a co-producer
- ^{^[b]} denotes a vocal producer
- ^{^[c]} denotes a remix producer

== Personnel ==
Personnel are adapted from the liner notes of The Breakthrough.

- Mary J. Blige – all vocals, vocal producer, songwriter
- Johntá Austin – songwriter
- Bryan-Michael Cox – additional instruments, music producer, songwriter
- Pat Dillet – recording engineer
- Mike Eleopolous – additional recording engineer
- Ron Fair – additional instruments, Pro Tools, vocal producer, vocal arrangements, string arrangements, strings conducted by
- Dave Pensado – mixing engineer
- Jason Perry – songwriter
- Young Smoke – keyboards, additional music producer
- Allen Sides – strings recording engineer

== Charts ==
=== Weekly charts ===
Weekly chart performance for "Be Without You"
Chart (2005–2006)	Peak position
Australia (ARIA)	30
Australian Urban (ARIA)	8
Austria (Ö3 Austria Top 40)	23
Belgium (Ultratop 50 Flanders)	42
Belgium (Ultratip Bubbling Under Wallonia)	1
Canada CHR/Pop Top 30 (Radio & Records)	2
Canada Hot AC Top 30 (Radio & Records)	19
Finland (Suomen virallinen lista)	13
France (SNEP)	22
Germany (GfK)	12
Netherlands (Dutch Top 40)	6
Netherlands (Single Top 100)	6
New Zealand (Recorded Music NZ)	9
Scottish Singles Sales (Official Charts)	48
Sweden (Sverigetopplistan)	34
Switzerland (Schweizer Hitparade)	5
UK Singles (Official Charts)	32
UK Hip Hop/R&B (Official Charts)	4
US Billboard Hot 100	3
US Adult Pop Airplay (Billboard)	34
US Dance Club Songs (Billboard)	1
US Dance Airplay (Billboard)	1
US Hot R&B/Hip-Hop Songs (Billboard)	1
US Pop Airplay (Billboard)	1
US Rhythmic Airplay (Billboard)	1

=== Year-end charts ===
2006 year-end chart performance for "Be Without You"
Chart (2006)	Position
Netherlands (Dutch Top 40)	73
Netherlands (Single Top 100)	87
Switzerland (Schweizer Hitparade)	53
UK Singles (OCC)	156
US Billboard Hot 100	11
US Dance Club Play (Billboard)	20
US Hot Dance Airplay (Billboard)	3
US Hot R&B/Hip-Hop Songs (Billboard)	1
US Rhythmic Airplay (Billboard)	7
US All-Format (Radio & Records)	1
US CHR/Top 40 (Radio & Records)	17
US Rhythmic (Radio & Records)	7
US Urban (Radio & Records)	1
US Urban AC (Radio & Records)	2

2007 year-end chart performance for "Be Without You"
Chart (2007)	Position
US Hot R&B/Hip-Hop Songs (Billboard)	94

== Certifications ==
Certifications for "Be Without You"
Region	Certification	Certified units/sales
New Zealand (RMNZ)	Platinum	30,000^{‡}
United Kingdom (BPI)	Gold	400,000^{‡}
United States (RIAA)	2× Platinum	2,000,000^{^}
^{^} Shipments figures based on certification alone.^{‡} Sales+streaming figures based on certification alone.

== Release history ==
Release history and formats for "Be Without You"
Region	Date	Format(s)	Label(s)	Ref(s).
United States	November 14, 2005	Rhythmic contemporary; urban AC radio	Matriarch; Geffen	
United Kingdom	December 19, 2005	12-inch vinyl; CD	Matriarch; Geffen	
Various	January 20, 2006	Digital download	Matriarch; Geffen	
United States	January 30, 2006	Contemporary hit radio	Matriarch; Geffen	

== Cover versions ==
- English dance group Booty Luv covered the song for their debut album, Boogie 2Nite (2007).
- Smooth jazz saxophonist and musician Eric Darius covered the song on his 2008 album, Goin' All Out.
- A cover of the Moto Blanco remix by Wi-Fi featuring Melanie M was released in the UK by All Around the World in March 2007.
