= Enough Cryin =

Single by Mary J. Blige

from the album The Breakthrough
- Released: March 2, 2006
- Length: 4:20
- Label: Geffen
- Songwriters: Mary J. Blige; Rodney Jerkins; Sean Garrett; Shawn Carter
- Producer: Jerkins

Mary J. Blige singles chronology
"Be Without You" (2005)	"Enough Cryin" (2006)	"One" (2006)

Music video
- "Enough Cryin" on YouTube

"Enough Cryin" a song by American singer Mary J. Blige. It was written by Blige, Sean Garrett, Shawn "Jay-Z" Carter, and Rodney "Darkchild" Jerkins for her seventh studio album, The Breakthrough (2005), while production was helmed by the latter. The song introduces Blige's rap alter ego, Brook Lynn, who delivers the song's rap verse. Blige's rap verse was originally written by Jay-Z for Foxy Brown, but Jerkins rejected Brown's vocals and it was instead suggested that Blige record the verse herself.

The song earned generally positive reviews from music critics who ranked it among the album's standout tracks. On March 2, 2006, "Enough Cryin" was released by Geffen Records as the album's third single in the United States. It peaked at number 32 on the US Billboard Hot 100 and number two on the Hot R&B/Hip-Hop Songs chart. While the song was less successful internationally, it also peaked at number six on the UK R&B Singles Charts and became a top twenty hit in the Netherlands.

== Background ==
"Enough Cryin" was written by Mary J. Blige, Rodney Jerkins, Sean Garrett, and rapper Jay-Z for her seventh studio album, The Breakthrough (2005). Production of the song was overseen by Jerkins. Lyrically, "Enough Cryin" was inspired by Blige's six year relationship with singer Cedric "K-Ci" Hailey of the R&B group Jodeci. During a 1995 interview on the UK television show The Word, Blige confirmed the two were engaged, though Hailey had previously denied that they were going to get married. Their turbulent relationship also largely inspired Blige's second studio album My Life (1994). Blige commented on the song: "I'm saying, 'I'm getting on with my life. I'm gonna go ahead and do my work'."

Jay-Z penned the rap verse that Blige performs on "Enough Cryin." Actually ghost written for rapper Foxy Brown, Brown's vocals were rejected by Jerkins and it was instead suggested that Blige record the verse herself. As a result, "Enough Cryin" became the debut performance of Blige's rap alter ego Brook Lynn who would later re-appear on the song "Midnight Drive" from her tenth studio album My Life II... The Journey Continues (Act 1). Brown attributed her severe and sudden hearing loss in both ears in 2005 to her omittance from the song. In 2011, she further elaborated: "When you hear Mary in the video like, 'You turned your back and back I came running, but the simple fact is that you ain't want me,' that was me. Mary had enough respect to say, 'Listen, before I go get another rap bitch to do your part, I'ma call myself Brook-Lyn and I'ma learn your part and I'ma go in and rap it for you'."

== Critical reception ==
"Enough Cryin" earned generally positive reviews from music critics. Contactmusic.com described the song as a "monster urban hit" and called Jerkin's production "jaw droppin." The online magazine found that "Blige doesn't just sing this, she nails it [...] The face slapping snares that come outta the speakers and slap you square in the face. Those droning, haunting keyboards and production sounds that are oh so Darkchild. Added to lyrics that are just as jaw dropping as the vocal performance and production." Da'Shan Smith from uDiscoverMusic found that "over a Darkchild beat, "Enough Cryin" made good on its promise. Most Mary J Blige songs are based on a hip-hop/soul fusion, but on "Enough Cryin," you get a glimpse of her MC skills, as her alter ego, Brooklyn, proves she could dominate both genres with ease."

Billboard felt that song "embodies everything that Blige is renowned for: She is aching something fierce over love gone wrong, she sings her kaboodle off with razor-sharp chops and even raps (via 'alter ego' Brook)." Fellow Billboard critic Nerisha Penrose wrote: "Leave it to Mary J to turn her pain into a bouncy earworm as she wipes her hands clean of a toxic romance that cost her friends and family." Rolling Stone editor Barry Walters declared "Enough Cryin" as "elegant and stark as a beat-box-driven Run-DMC classic," while David Browne from Entertainment Weekly called the song "defiant [with] "fisticuff rhythms that match her anger." Kitty Empire, writing for The Guardian, and Jim Harrington from The East Bay Times both ranked the song among the standout tracks on parent album The Breakthrough. BET.com wrote of the song: "Backed by a banging, Dr. Dre-esque beat from long-time collaborator Jerkins, Mary shows indomitable swagger here, once again singing herself away from the painful baggage of the past—and even skillfully spitting a Jay-Z-penned rap."

== Music video ==
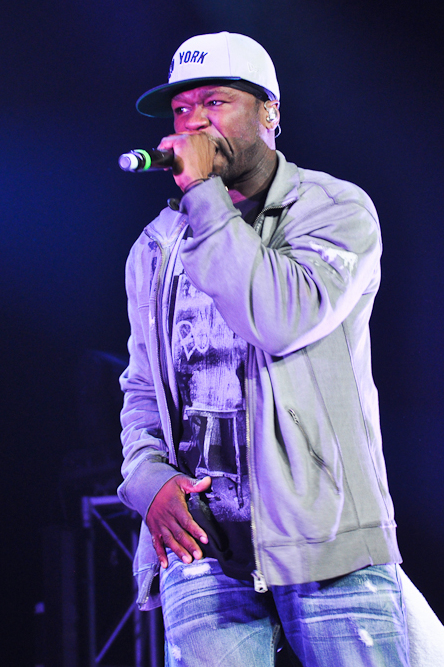
Rapper 50 Cent appears as R&B singer Curtis Jackson in the video.

Blige reunited with Hype Williams, director of her visuals for "Be Happy" (1994) and "Everything" (1997), to film a music video for "Enough Cryin." It was largely shot in Long Beach, California in March 2006, Inspired by true events, Blige explained during filmming that the clip was about "something that happened a long time ago, and it was a very embarrassing moment when I thought I was getting married. I was engaged to K-Ci, and I actually went on a talk show overseas and that person had just done that talk show about a week before me. I was telling the interviewer that I was getting married, and the week before he was saying that it was a rumor. He wasn't marrying me."

Blige approached rapper 50 Cent to appear in the clip after the pair had collaborated on the song "It's Alright" from rap group Mobb Deep's 2006 studio album Blood Money. He portrays Curtis "C.J." Jackson, an "aggressive" R&B singer who loses his cool after he is questioned by an interviewer. In the video, after she leaves the interview, Blige is "kind of upset, but I'm still kind of going through my photo shoot [...] It ends up being one of the most amazing photo shoots because of all of the anger and depression and the fact that I choose to just move on with my life and be a superstar." In an interview with MTV News, Blige further remarked: "It's real comical."

== Track listings ==
CD 1
No.	Title	Writer(s)	Producer(s)	Length
1.	"Enough Cryin" (UK Radio Edit)	Mary J. Blige; Rodney Jerkins; Sean Garrett; Shawn Carter; Craig Brockman	Jerkins	3:30
2.	"Be Without You" (Live from AOL Music Sessions)	Johnta Austin; Blige; Bryan-Michael Cox; Jason Perry		4:31

CD 2
No.	Title	Writer(s)	Producer(s)	Length
1.	"Enough Cryin" (Album Version)	Blige; Jerkins; Garrett; Carter; Brockman	Jerkins	3:21
2.	"Out My Head"	Rich Harrison	Harrison	3:42
3.	"Be Without You" (Moto Blanco Vocal Remix)	Austin; Blige; Cox; Perry	Cox; Young Smoke^{[a]}; Moto Blanco^{[b]}	8:40
4.	"Enough Cryin" (Instrumental)	Blige; Jerkins; Garrett; Carter; Brockman	Jerkins	4:02
5.	"Enough Cryin" (Music Video)			4:07

Notes

- ^{^[a]} denotes a co-producer
- ^{^[b]} denotes a remix producer

== Credits and personnel ==
Credits adapted from the liner notes of The Breakthrough.

- Mary J. Blige – vocals, songwriter
- Craig Brockman – piano
- Shawn Carter - songwriter
- Patrick Fillett – recording engineer
- Paul Foley – recording engineer
- Sean Garrett - vocal producer, songwriter
- Rodney "Darkchild" Jerkins – audio mixing, other instruments, music producer, songwriter
- Tony Maserati – audio mixing
- Cornelius Mims – bass
- Tim Stuart – guitar
- Jeff Villanueva - recording engineer

== Charts ==
=== Weekly charts ===
Weekly chart performance for "Enough Cryin"
Chart (2006)	Peak position
Belgium (Ultratip Bubbling Under Flanders)	15
Netherlands (Dutch Top 40 Tipparade)	12
Germany (GfK)	88
Ireland (IRMA)	35
Scottish Singles Sales (Official Charts)	45
UK Singles (Official Charts)	46
UK Hip Hop/R&B (Official Charts)	6
US Billboard Hot 100	32
US Hot R&B/Hip-Hop Songs (Billboard)	2
US Rhythmic Airplay (Billboard)	24

=== Year-end charts ===
Year-end chart performance for "Enough Cryin"
Chart (2006)	Position
UK Urban (Music Week)	34
US Hot R&B/Hip-Hop Songs (Billboard)	10
