= List of awards and nominations received by Mary J. Blige =

Mary J. Blige awards and nominations
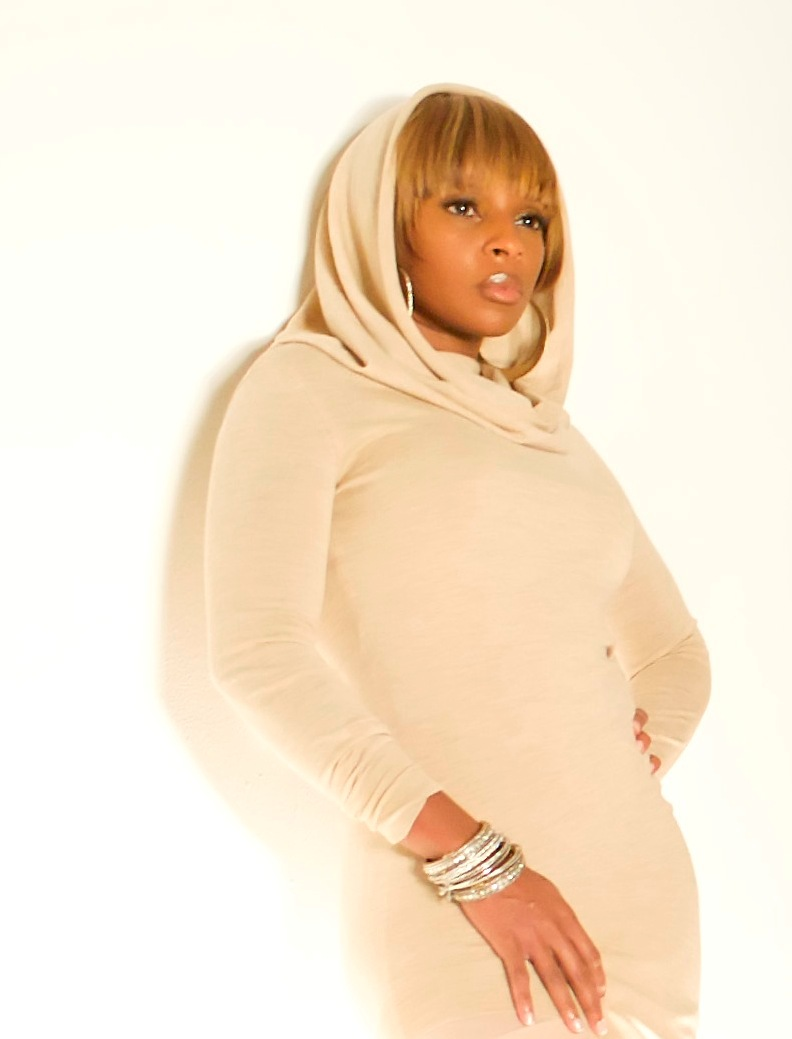
- Blige in 2007
Awards and nominations
| Award | Wins | Nominations |
| American Music Awards | 4 | 11 |
| BET | 6 | 19 |
| Billboard | 12 | 12 |
| Golden Globe | 0 | 3 |
| Grammy | 9 | 38 |
| MTV VMA | 1 | 6 |
| Soul Train | 6 | 21 |
| World Music | 2 | 2 |
| Emmy Awards | 1 | 1 |
| Academy Awards | 0 | 2 |
| Critics' Choice Awards | 2 | 4 |
| Satellite Awards | 0 | 2 |
| Screen Actors Guild Awards | 0 | 2 |
| Spirit Awards | 1 | 1 |

Totals (Note: Certain award groups do not simply award one winner. They acknowledge several different recipients, have runners-up, and have third place. Since this is a specific recognition and is different from losing an award, runner-up mentions are considered wins in this award tally. For simplification and to avoid errors, each award in this list has been presumed to have had a prior nomination.)
- Wins: 88
- Nominations: 236

Mary J. Blige has received a total of 88 awards from 235 nominations for her music and acting career. She was recognized with nine awards from thirty-eight nominations at the Grammy Awards. She was honored with the Legend Award for Outstanding Contribution to R&B Music at the World Music Awards and received the Voice of Music Award by ASCAP in 2007. She has won six BET Awards, including the Lifetime Achievement Award in 2019 and the Icon of the Year by Billboard Women in Music in 2017. In 2006, she won nine Billboard Music Awards in one night and has earned 11 overall. This included the Billboard Icon Award that she was bestowed in 2022. Blige was also acknowledged by the Rock and Roll Hall of Fame, first being nominated in 2021 and inducted on her second ballot in the 2024 class, 32 years after releasing her debut album. Blige has been recognized by Billboard as "the most successful female R&B/Hip-Hop artist of the past 25 years". She also won six Soul Train Music Awards, ten NAACP Image Award and won a MTV Video Music Award.

During her acting career, she has recorded for multiple soundtracks such as, The Living Proof from the film The Help (2011), which earned her a Golden Globe Award nomination as Best Original Song - Motion Picture, and won a Black Reel Awards and a Critics' Choice Award for Best Original or Adapted Song. She also won a Critics Choice Award for Never Gonna Break My Faith with Aretha Franklin in 2007. Blige received many nominations and accolades for her performance in Mudbound (2017), in which she plays the role of Florence Jackson and sings the song "Mighty River", both earning her Academy Award nominations for Best Supporting Actress and Best Original Song categories. She also received nominations for two Critics' Choice Awards, two Golden Globe, two Screen Actors Guild Awards and a Satellite Awards for both acting and music.

== Major awards ==
=== Academy Awards ===
The Academy Awards, or Oscars, is an annual American awards ceremony honoring cinematic achievements in the film industry, and is organised by the Academy of Motion Picture Arts and Sciences (AMPAS). Mary J. Blige has received two nominations.

| Year | Nominee / work | Award | Result | Ref. |
|---|---|---|---|---|
| 2018 | Mudbound | Best Supporting Actress | Nominated | |
| 2018 | Mudbound | Best Original Song (for "Mighty River") | Nominated | |

=== Golden Globe Awards ===
The Golden Globe Awards were established in 1944 by the Hollywood Foreign Press Association to celebrate the best in film and television. Mary J. Blige has received three nominations.

| Year | Nominee / work | Award | Result | Ref. |
|---|---|---|---|---|
| 2011 | "The Living Proof" | Best Original Song - Motion Picture | Nominated | |
| 2018 | "Mighty River" | Best Original Song - Motion Picture | Nominated | |
| 2018 | Mudbound | Best Supporting Actress - Motion Picture | Nominated | |

=== Grammy Awards ===
The Grammy Awards are awarded annually by the National Academy of Recording Arts and Sciences. Blige has received thirty-eight nominations, including for Album of the Year, Record of the Year and Song of the Year, being awarded nine of them.

| Year | Nominee / work | Award | Result |
|---|---|---|---|
| 1996 | My Life | Best R&B Album | Nominated |
| 1996 | "I'll Be There for You/You're All I Need to Get By" (w/ Method Man) | Best Rap Performance by a Duo or Group | Won |
| 1997 | "Not Gon' Cry" | Best Female R&B Vocal Performance | Nominated |
| 1997 | Waiting to Exhale (featured artist) | Album of the Year | Nominated |
| 1998 | Share My World | Best R&B Album | Nominated |
| 1999 | "Lean On Me" (w/ Kirk Franklin, R. Kelly, Crystal Lewis, & Bono) | Best R&B Vocal Performance by a Duo or Group | Nominated |
| 2000 | "All That I Can Say" | Best Female R&B Vocal Performance | Nominated |
| 2000 | "Don't Waste Your Time" (w/ Aretha Franklin) | Best R&B Vocal Performance by a Duo or Group | Nominated |
| 2000 | Mary | Best R&B Album | Nominated |
| 2001 | "911" (w/ Wyclef Jean) | Best R&B Vocal Performance by a Duo or Group | Nominated |
| 2002 | "Family Affair" | Best Female R&B Vocal Performance | Nominated |
| 2002 | No More Drama | Best R&B Album | Nominated |
| 2003 | "He Think I Don't Know" | Best Female R&B Vocal Performance | Won |
| 2004 | "Whenever I Say Your Name" (w/ Sting) | Best Pop Collaboration with Vocals | Won |
| 2004 | "Ooh!" | Best Female R&B Vocal Performance | Nominated |
| 2004 | Love & Life | Best Contemporary R&B Album | Nominated |
| 2007 | "Be Without You" | Record of the Year | Nominated |
| 2007 | "Be Without You" | Song of the Year | Nominated |
| 2007 | "Be Without You" | Best Female R&B Vocal Performance | Won |
| 2007 | "Be Without You" | Best R&B Song | Won |
| 2007 | "One" (w/ U2) | Best Pop Collaboration with Vocals | Nominated |
| 2007 | "Love Changes" (w/ Jamie Foxx) | Best R&B Vocal Performance by a Duo or Group | Nominated |
| 2007 | "I Found My Everything" (w/ Raphael Saadiq) | Best Traditional R&B Vocal Performance | Nominated |
| 2007 | The Breakthrough | Best R&B Album | Won |
| 2008 | "Just Fine" | Best Female R&B Vocal Performance | Nominated |
| 2008 | "Disrespectful" (w/ Chaka Khan) | Best R&B Vocal Performance by a Duo or Group | Won |
| 2008 | "Never Gonna Break My Faith" (w/ Aretha Franklin) | Best Gospel Performance | Won |
| 2009 | Growing Pains | Best Contemporary R&B Album | Won |
| 2010 | "IfULeave" (w/ Musiq Soulchild) | Best R&B Vocal Performance by a Duo or Group | Nominated |
| 2014 | "Now or Never" (w/ Kendrick Lamar) | Best Rap/Sung Collaboration | Nominated |
| 2014 | good kid, m.A.A.d city (featured artist) | Album of the Year | Nominated |
| 2015 | F For You (w/ Disclosure) | Best Dance Recording | Nominated |
| 2023 | Good Morning Gorgeous (Deluxe) | Album of the Year | Nominated |
| 2023 | Good Morning Gorgeous (Deluxe) | Best R&B Album | Nominated |
| 2023 | "Good Morning Gorgeous" | Record of the Year | Nominated |
| 2023 | "Good Morning Gorgeous" | Best Traditional R&B Performance | Nominated |
| 2023 | "Good Morning Gorgeous" | Best R&B Song | Nominated |
| 2023 | "Here With Me" (featuring Anderson .Paak) | Best R&B Performance | Nominated |

=== Primetime Emmy Awards ===
The Primetime Emmy Awards are bestowed by the Academy of Television Arts & Sciences (ATAS), in recognition of excellence in U.S. American primetime television programming.

| Year | Nominee / work | Award | Result | Ref. |
|---|---|---|---|---|
| 2022 | The Pepsi Super Bowl LVI Halftime Show | Outstanding Variety Special (Live) | Won | |

=== Screen Actors Guild Awards ===
Screen Actors Guild Awards are accolades given by the Screen Actors Guild-American Federation of Television and Radio Artists (SAG-AFTRA), in which was founded in 1952 to recognize outstanding performances in film and prime time television. Mary J. Blige has received two nominations.

| Year | Nominee / work | Award | Result | Ref. |
|---|---|---|---|---|
| 2018 | Mudbound | Outstanding Performance by a Female Actor in a Supporting Role | Nominated | |
| 2018 | Mudbound | Outstanding Performance by a Cast in a Motion Picture | Nominated | |

== Music awards ==
=== ARC ===
==== Top Pop Artists of The Past 25 Years ====
| Year | Nominee / work | Award | Result |
|---|---|---|---|
| 2004 | Herself | 34 | Won |

=== American Music Awards ===
The American Music Awards is an annual music awards ceremony and one of several major annual American music awards shows. Mary has won four American Music Awards out of ten nominations.

| Year | Nominee / work | Award | Result |
|---|---|---|---|
| 1998 | Share My World | Favorite Soul/R&B Album | Won |
| 2002 | Herself | Favorite Soul/R&B Artist | Nominated |
| 2003 | Herself | Favorite Hip-Hop/R&B Female Artist | Won |
| 2006 | Herself | Favorite Soul/R&B Artist | Won |
| 2006 | Herself | Artist of The Year | Nominated |
| 2006 | The Breakthrough | Favorite Soul/R&B Album | Won |
| 2008 | Herself | Favorite Hip-Hop/R&B Female Artist | Nominated |
| 2008 | Growing Pains | Favorite Soul/R&B Album | Nominated |
| 2012 | Herself | Favorite Female Soul/R&B Artist | Nominated |
| 2014 | Herself | Favorite Female Soul/R&B Artist | Nominated |
| 2015 | Herself | Favorite Female Soul/R&B Artist | Nominated |

=== ASCAP ===
==== ASCAP Pop Music Awards ====
| Year | Nominee / work | Award | Result |
|---|---|---|---|
| 2003 | Family Affair | Most Performed Songs | Won |
| 2007 | Be Without You | Most Performed Songs | Won |
| 2007 | Be Without You | Pop Music Award | Won |
| 2007 | Be Without You | Song of The Year | Won |
| 2007 | Herself | Songwriter of The Year | Won |
| 2007 | Herself | Voice of Music Award | Won |

==== ASCAP Rhythm & Soul Awards ====
| Year | Nominee / work | Award | Result |
|---|---|---|---|
| 1996 | Be Happy | Most Performed Songs | Won |
| 1998 | I Can Love You (with Lil' Kim) | Award Winning R&B/Rap Songs | Won |
| 1998 | Love Is All We Need | Award Winning R&B/Rap Songs | Won |
| 2008 | Take Me as I Am | Award Winning R&B/Rap Songs | Won |
| 2018 | Thick of It | Award Winning R&B/Hip Hop Songs | Won |
| 2018 | U + Me (Love Lesson) | Award Winning R&B/Hip Hop Songs | Won |

=== Black Girls Rock! ===
Black Girls Rock! is an annual award show that honors and promotes Black women in different fields involving music, entertainment, medicine, entrepreneurship and visionary aspects.

| Year | Nominee / work | Award | Result |
|---|---|---|---|
| 2009 | Mary J. Blige | Icon Award | Won |
| 2018 | Mary J. Blige | Icon Award | Won |

=== BET Awards ===
The BET Awards were established in 2001 by the Black Entertainment Television network to celebrate African Americans and other minorities in music, acting, sports, and other fields of entertainment over the past year. Mary has won five awards out of eighteen nominations.

| Year | Nominee / work | Award | Result |
|---|---|---|---|
| 2001 | Herself | Best Female R&B Artist | Won |
| 2002 | Herself | Best Female R&B Artist | Nominated |
| 2004 | Herself | Best Female R&B Artist | Nominated |
| 2006 | Be Without You | Video of The Year | Won |
| 2006 | Touch It (Remix) (with Busta Rhymes, Rah Digga, Missy Elliott, Lloyd Banks, Papoose, DMX) | Video of The Year | Nominated |
| 2006 | Touch It (Remix) (with Busta Rhymes, Rah Digga, Missy Elliott, Lloyd Banks, Papoose, DMX) | Best Duet Collaboration | Nominated |
| 2006 | Touch It (Remix) (with Busta Rhymes, Rah Digga, Missy Elliott, Lloyd Banks, Papoose, DMX) | Viewers Choice | Nominated |
| 2006 | Herself | Best Female R&B Artist | Won |
| 2007 | Herself | Best Female R&B Artist | Nominated |
| 2007 | Runaway Love(with Ludacris) | Best Collaboration | Won |
| 2008 | Just Fine | Video of The Year | Nominated |
| 2008 | Herself | Best Female R&B Artist | Nominated |
| 2010 | Herself | Best Female R&B Artist | Nominated |
| 2012 | Herself | Best Female R&B Artist | Nominated |
| 2015 | Stay with Me ft Sam Smith | Centric Award | Nominated |
| 2017 | Herself | Best Female R&B Artist | Nominated |
| 2017 | Thick of It | Centric Awards | Nominated |
| 2018 | Strength of a Woman | Bet Her Award | Won |
| 2019 | Herself | Lifetime Achievement Award | Won |
| 2022 | Good Morning Gorgeous | Bet Her Award | Won |

=== Billboard ===
==== Billboard Music Awards ====
| Year | Nominee / work | Award | Result |
|---|---|---|---|
| 1995 | My Life | R&B/Hip-Hop Album of the Year | Won |
| 2006 | Be Without You | Video Clip of the Year | Won |
| 2006 | Be Without You | Hot 100 Airplay of the Year | Won |
| 2006 | Be Without You | R&B/Hip-Hop Song Airplay of the Year | Won |
| 2006 | Be Without You | R&B/Hip-Hop Song of the Year | Won |
| 2006 | The Breakthrough | R&B/Hip-Hop Album of the Year | Won |
| 2006 | Herself | R&B/Hip-Hop Albums Artist of the Year | Won |
| 2006 | Herself | R&B/Hip-Hop Songs Artist of the Year | Won |
| 2006 | Herself | Female Artist of the Year | Won |
| 2006 | Herself | R&B/Hip-Hop Artist of the Year | Won |
| 2022 | Herself | Billboard Icon Award | Won |

==== Billboard Women in Music ====
| Year | Nominee / work | Award | Result |
|---|---|---|---|
| 2017 | Herself | Icon of the Year | Won |

=== Fonogram Awards ===
Fonogram Awards is the national music awards of Hungary, held every year since 1992 and promoted by Mahasz.

| Year | Nominee / work | Award | Result |
|---|---|---|---|
| 2018 | "Strength Of A Woman" | Rap or Hip Hop Album of the Year | Nominated |

=== GAFFA Awards ===
==== Danish Gaffa Awards ====
Delivered since 1991. The GAFFA Awards (Danish: GAFFA Prisen) are a Danish award that rewards popular music awarded by the magazine of the same name.

| Year | Nominee / work | Award | Result |
|---|---|---|---|
| 2018 | Strength Of A Woman | International Album of the Year | Nominated |
| 2018 | Herself | International Solo Artist of the Year | Nominated |

=== Hollywood Music in Media Awards ===
| Year | Nominee / work | Award | Result |
|---|---|---|---|
| 2017 | "Mighty River" (from Mudbound) | Original Song – Feature Film | Nominated |
| 2018 | "Stronger Than I Ever Was" (from Sherlock Gnomes) | Original Song — Animated Film | Won |
| 2021 | "See What You've Done" (from Belly of the Beast) | Original Song — Documentary | Nominated |
| 2021 | "Just Sing" (from Trolls World Tour) | Original Song — Animated Film | Won |

=== International Dance Music Awards ===
| Year | Nominee / work | Award | Result |
|---|---|---|---|
| 2007 | Be Without You | Best R&B/Urban Dance Track | Nominated |

=== MOBO Awards ===
| Year | Nominee / work | Award | Result |
|---|---|---|---|
| 2006 | Herself | Best Internationale Female | Nominated |
| 2006 | Be Without You | Best Song | Nominated |
| 2006 | Herself | Best R&B Artist | Nominated |

=== MTV Europe Music Awards ===
| Year | Nominee / work | Award | Result |
|---|---|---|---|
| 2002 | Herself | Best R&B Artist | Nominated |
| 2003 | Herself | Best R&B Artist | Nominated |
| 2006 | Herself | Best R&B Artist | Nominated |

=== MTV Video Music Awards ===
| Year | Nominee / work | Award | Result |
|---|---|---|---|
| 1993 | Real Love | Best Choreography | Nominated |
| 1993 | Real Love | Best R&B Video | Nominated |
| 2002 | No More Drama | Best R&B Video | Won |
| 2002 | Family Affair | Best Choreography | Nominated |
| 2006 | Be Without You | Best R&B Video | Nominated |
| 2008 | Just Fine | Best Hip-Hop Video | Nominated |

=== MTV Video Music Awards Japan ===
| Year | Category | Song | Result |
|---|---|---|---|
| 2002 | Best R&B | Herself | Nominated |
| 2004 | Best R&B Video | "Love @ 1st Sight" | Nominated |
| 2004 | Best Live Performance | Herself | Nominated |
| 2004 | Most Impressive Performance | Herself | Won |
| 2008 | Best R&B Video | "Just Fine" | Nominated |

=== NAACP Image Award ===
| Year | Nominee / work | Award | Result |
|---|---|---|---|
| 2000 | Herself | Outstanding Female Artist | Nominated |
| 2001 | Herself | Outstanding Female Artist | Nominated |
| 2001 | Your Child | Outstanding Music Video | Nominated |
| 2003 | No More Drama | Outstanding Music Video | Nominated |
| 2003 | Herself | Outstanding Female Artist | Nominated |
| 2004 | Herself | Outstanding Female Artist | Nominated |
| 2006 | Herself | Outstanding Female Artist | Nominated |
| 2006 | The Breakthrough | Outstanding Album | Nominated |
| 2007 | Herself | Outstanding Female Artist | Won |
| 2007 | Be Without You | Outstanding Music Video | Won |
| 2008 | Just Fine | Outstanding Music Video | Nominated |
| 2008 | Herself | Outstanding Female Artist | Nominated |
| 2010 | Herself | Outstanding Female Artist | Won |
| 2010 | Stronger with Each Tear | Outstanding Album | Won |
| 2011 | Herself | Outstanding Female Artist | Won |
| 2012 | Herself | Outstanding Female Artist | Nominated |
| 2012 | Mr. Wrong | Outstanding Duo, Group or Collaboration | Won |
| 2012 | 25/8 | Outstanding Music Video | Nominated |
| 2014 | Herself | Outstanding Female Artist | Nominated |
| 2015 | Herself | Outstanding Female Artist | Nominated |
| 2015 | Stay with Me ft. Sam Smith | Outstanding Duo, Group or Collaboration | Won |
| 2015 | Being with You ft. Snokey Robinson | Outstanding Duo, Group or Collaboration | Nominated |
| 2017 | Herself | Outstanding Female Artist | Won |
| 2017 | "Love Yourself" ft. Kanye West | Outstanding Duo, Group or Collaboration | Nominated |
| 2017 | "Strength of a Woman" | Outstanding Music Video | Nominated |
| 2017 | "Strength of a Woman" | Outstanding Album | Nominated |
| 2021 | Power Book II: Ghost | Outstanding Supporting Actress in a Drama Series | Won |
| 2022 | Power Book II: Ghost | Outstanding Supporting Actress in a Drama Series | Won |

=== National Recording Registry ===
| Year | Nominee / work | Award | Result |
|---|---|---|---|
| 2024 | My Life | National Recording Registry | Won |

=== People's Choice Awards ===
| Year | Nominee / work | Award | Result |
|---|---|---|---|
| 2011 | Herself | Favorite R&B Artist | Nominated |

=== Pop Awards ===
The Pop Awards are presented annually by Pop Magazine, honoring the best in popular music. Mary J. Blige has been nominated two times.

| Year | Nominee / work | Award | Result | Ref. |
|---|---|---|---|---|
| 2018 | Mary J. Blige | Lifetime Achievement Award | Nominated | |
| 2022 | "Hourglass" | Song of the Year Award | Nominated | |

=== Rock and Roll Hall of Fame ===
The Rock and Roll Hall of Fame is a museum located on the shores of Lake Erie in downtown Cleveland, Ohio, United States, dedicated to recording the history of some of the best-known and most influential artists, producers, and other people who have in some major way influenced the music industry.

Blige was inducted into the Rock and Roll Hall of Fame on October 19, 2024.

| Year | Nominated Work | Category | Result | Ref. |
|---|---|---|---|---|
| 2024 | Rock and Roll Hall of Fame | Performer | Inducted | |

=== Lady of Soul Awards ===
| Year | Nominee / work | Award | Result |
|---|---|---|---|
| 2000 | Mary | Best R&B/Soul Album | Won |
| 2000 | Mary | R&B/Soul Or Rap Album Of The Year | Nominated |
| 2000 | Mary | Sammy Davis Jr. Award for Entertainer of the Year-Female | Won |
| 2001 | Your Child | Best R&B/Soul Single, Female | Nominated |
| 2003 | No More Drama | Best R&B/Soul Album - Female | Nominated |
| 2004 | Love & Life | Best R&B/Soul Album - Female | Nominated |
| 2007 | The Breakthrough | Best R&B/Soul Album - Female | Won |
| 2007 | Take Me as I Am | Best R&B/Soul Single - Female | Nominated |
| 2010 | Herself | Best Female R&B/Soul Artist | Nominated |
| 2012 | Herself | Best Female R&B/Soul Artist | Nominated |

=== Soul Train Music Awards ===
| Year | Nominee / work | Award | Result |
|---|---|---|---|
| 1993 | Herself | Best R&B/Soul or Rap New Artist | Won |
| 1993 | Real Love | Best R&B/Soul Single Female | Nominated |
| 1993 | What's the 411? | Best R&B/Soul Album Female | Won |
| 1996 | My Life | Best R&B/Soul Album Female | Won |
| 1996 | I'm Goin' Down | Best R&B/Soul Single Female | Nominated |
| 1997 | Not Gon' Cry | Best R&B/Soul Single Female | Nominated |
| 1998 | Share My World | Album of the Year | Nominated |
| 1998 | Share My World | Best R&B/Soul Album Female | Nominated |
| 1998 | Everything | Best R&B/Soul Single Female | Nominated |
| 2000 | Herself | Sammy Davis Jr. Award for Entertainer of the Year | Won |
| 2000 | Mary | Best R&B/Soul Album Female | Won |
| 2000 | Mary | Best R&B/Soul or Rap Album of the Year | Nominated |
| 2001 | Your Child | Best R&B/Soul Single Female | Nominated |
| 2003 | No More Drama | Best R&B/Soul Album Female | Nominated |
| 2004 | Love & Life | Best R&B/Soul Album Female | Nominated |
| 2007 | The Breakthrough | Best R&B/Soul Album - Female | Won |
| 2007 | Take Me as I Am | Best R&B/Soul Single - Female | Nominated |
| 2010 | Herself | Best Female R&B/Soul Artist | Nominated |
| 2017 | Herself | Best Female R&B/Soul Artist | Nominated |
| 2017 | Strength Of A Woman | Album/ Mixtape Of The Year | Nominated |
| 2017 | Love Yourself ft. Kanye West | Best Collaboration | Nominated |
| 2019 | Herself | Best Female R&B/Soul Artist | Nominated |
| 2022 | Herself | Best Female R&B/Soul Artist | Nominated |
| 2022 | Herself | Soul Train Certified Award | Won |
| 2022 | Good Morning Gorgeous | Album/ Mixtape Of The Year | Nominated |
| 2022 | "Good Morning Gorgeous" | Song Of The Year | Nominated |
| 2022 | "Good Morning Gorgeous" | Video Of The Year | Nominated |
| 2022 | "Good Morning Gorgeous" | The Ashford & Simpson Songwriter's Award | Nominated |
| 2022 | "Amazing" ft. DJ Khaled | Best Collaboration | Nominated |

=== Source Awards ===
| Year | Nominee / work | Award | Result |
|---|---|---|---|
| 1994 | Herself | R&B Artist of the Year | Won |
| 1995 | Herself | R&B Artist of the Year | Won |
| 2000 | Herself | R&B Artist of the Year | Won |

=== UK Music Video Awards ===
| Year | Nominee / work | Award | Result |
|---|---|---|---|
| 2020 | "Always" (with Waze & Odyssey & George Michael) | Best Dance/Electronic Video - UK | Nominated |
| 2020 | "Always" (with Waze & Odyssey & George Michael) | Best Choreography in a Video | Nominated |

=== World Soundtrack Awards ===
| Year | Nominee / work | Award | Result |
|---|---|---|---|
| 2012 | "The Living Proof" | Best Original Song Written for a Film | Nominated |

== Film and television awards ==
=== AACTA International Awards ===
The AACTA International Awards is presented by the Australian Academy of Cinema and Television Arts (AACTA), a non-profit organisation whose aim is to identify, award, promote and celebrate Australia's greatest achievements in film and television.

| Year | Nominee / work | Award | Result | Ref. |
|---|---|---|---|---|
| 2017 | Mudbound | Best Supporting Actress | Nominated | |

=== Black Reel Awards ===
| Year | Nominee / work | Award | Result |
|---|---|---|---|
| 2010 | I Can Do Bad (I Can Do Bad by Myself) | Best Original or Adapted Song | Nominated |
| 2012 | Living Proof (The Help) | Best Original or Adapted Song | Won |
| 2015 | Herself | Outstanding Supporting Actress, TV Movie or Limited Series | Nominated |
| 2018 | Herself | Outstanding Supporting Actress | Nominated |
| 2018 | Herself | Outstanding Breakthrough Performance, Female | Nominated |
| 2018 | Mighty River (Mudbound) | Outstanding Original Song | Won |

=== Critics' Choice Movie Awards ===
| Year | Nominee / work | Award | Result |
|---|---|---|---|
| 2007 | "Never Gonna Break My Faith" (with Aretha Franklin) | Best Song | Won |
| 2012 | "The Living Proof" | Best Song | Won |
| 2018 | Mudbound | Best Supporting Actress | Nominated |
| 2018 | Mudbound | Best Acting Ensemble | Nominated |

=== Gotham Independent Film Awards ===
| Year | Nominee / work | Award | Result |
|---|---|---|---|
| 2017 | Herself | Breakthrough Actor | Nominated |
| 2017 | Mudbound | Ensemble Performance (Special Jury Award) | Won |

=== Hollywood Film Awards ===
| Year | Nominee / work | Award | Result |
|---|---|---|---|
| 2016 | Mudbound | Breakthrough Ensemble | Won |
| 2017 | Herself | Breakout Performance Actress | Won |

=== Independent Spirit Awards ===
| Year | Nominee / work | Award | Result |
|---|---|---|---|
| 2018 | Mudbound | Robert Altman Award | Won |

=== SAG Awards ===
| Year | Nominee / work | Award | Result |
|---|---|---|---|
| 2018 | Herself | Best Supporting Actress | Nominated |
| 2018 | Mudbound | Best Cast | Nominated |

=== Satellite Awards ===
| Year | Nominee / work | Award | Result |
|---|---|---|---|
| 2009 | I Can See In Color (from Precious soundtrack) | Best Original Song | Nominated |
| 2018 | Mudbound | Best Supporting Actress | Nominated |

=== Critics awards ===
Critics' Awards
| Year | Nominated work | Category | Result | Ref. |
Alliance of Women Film Journalists
| 2017 | Mudbound | Best Supporting Actress | Nominated | |
Austin Film Critics Association
| 2017 | Mudbound | Best Supporting Actress | Nominated | |
| 2017 | Mudbound | Breakthrough Artist Award | Nominated | |
Awards Circuit Community Awards (ACCA)
| 2018 | Mudbound | Best Cast Ensemble | Nominated | |
| 2018 | "Mighty River" | Best Original Song | Nominated | |
Black Film Critics Circle Awards
| 2018 | Mudbound | Best Supporting Actress | Nominated | |
| 2018 | Mudbound | Best Ensemble | Won | |
Chicago Film Critics Association Awards
| 2017 | Mudbound | Best Supporting Actress | Nominated | |
Dallas-Fort Worth Film Critics Association Awards
| 2017 | Mudbound | Best Supporting Actress | Nominated | |
Detroit Film Critics Society
| 2018 | Mudbound | Best Ensemble | Nominated | |
Dorian Awards
| 2018 | Mudbound | Supporting Film Performance of the Year – Actress | Nominated | |
Georgia Film Critics Association
| 2018 | Mudbound | Best Ensemble | Nominated | |
| 2018 | "Mighty River" | Best Original Song | Nominated | |
IndieWire Honors Association
| 2018 | Mudbound | Breakthrough Performance | Won | |
New York Film Critics Online
| 2018 | Mudbound | Best Ensemble Cast | Won | |
Palm Springs International Film Festival
| 2018 | Mudbound | Breakthrough Performance Award | Won | |
San Diego Film Critics Society
| 2018 | Mudbound | Best Ensemble | Won | |
Santa Barbara International Film Festival
| 2018 | Mudbound | Virtuoso Award | Won | |
Washington D.C. Area Film Critics Association
| 2018 | Mudbound | Best Supporting Actress | Nominated | |
| 2018 | Mudbound | Best Acting Ensemble | Nominated | |

== Fashion and entrepreneur awards ==
=== FiFi Awards ===
| Year | Nominee / work | Award | Result |
|---|---|---|---|
| 2011 | Herself | Sales Breakthrough | Won |
| 2011 | Herself | Consumer Direct | Won |

=== Vibe Awards ===
| Year | Nominee / work | Award | Result |
|---|---|---|---|
| 2003 | Herself | Most Stylish | Nominated |
| 2005 | Herself | VLegend Award | Won |
