= Amazing (Mary J. Blige song) =

Single by Mary J. Blige featuring DJ Khaled

from the album Good Morning Gorgeous
- Released: December 3, 2021
- Length: 2:40
- Label: 300; Mary Jane
- Songwriters: Mary J. Blige; Denisia Andrews; Brittany Coney; DJ Khaled; Street Runner; Tarik Azzouz; Willie Cobbs; Bo Diddley
- Producers: Khaled; Street Runner; Tarik Azzouz

Mary J. Blige singles chronology
"Good Morning Gorgeous" (2021)	"Amazing" (2021)	"Rent Money" (2022)

"Amazing" is a song by American singer Mary J. Blige featuring DJ Khaled. It was written by Blige and Khaled along with Nicholas "Street Runner" Warwar, and Tarik Azzouz as well as Denisia Andrews and Brittany Coney from duo Nova Wav for her same-titled fourteenth studio album (2022). Production was helmed by Khaled, Azzouz and Warwar, with Nova Wav serving also vocal producers. The song contains excerpts from the record "You Don't Love Me (No, No, No)" (1994) by Jamaican singer Dawn Penn. Due to the sample, Willie Cobbs and Bo Diddley are also credited as songwriters.

The song was released by 300 Entertainment as the album's lead single on December 3, 2021 along with Good Morning Gorgeous's title track. While it was commercially less successful than "Good Morning Gorgeous," the song peaked at number 24 on the US R&B/Hip-Hop Digital Song Sales chart. Critical reception towards "Amazing" was generally mixed. An accompanying music video was directed by Eif Rivera and filmed at a palatial residence in Miami Beach in late 2021. It features appearances from N.O.R.E., Trina, Angie Martinez, Misa Hylton, and Diddy.

== Critical reception ==
Erika Marie from HotNewHipHop described "Amazing" as a "self-confidence anthem" and added: "It's clear that Mary J. is not playing around and we can't wait to hear what else she has lined up." Variety critic A.D. Amorosi found that "even the dub-inflected "Amazing" from Blige and DJ Khaled — complete with his usual boasts and mottos — is different than much of the singer’s work in clipped pop club-hop from her past. While the track doesn’t stand up to the drama of the rest of Good Morning Gorgeous in terms of stateliness, it doesn’t have to. Blige sounds more comfortable having a laugh than she ever has — that is true head-back, wind-in-your-hair freedom." In a negative review, Eric Torres from Clash called the song a "misfire that sinks almost immediately on launch."

== Chart performance ==
While it failed to chart on most of Billboard's component charts and was significantly less successful than "Good Morning Gorgeous", "Amazing" peaked at number 24 on the US R&B/Hip-Hop Digital Song Sales chart in the week of December 18, 2021.

== Music video ==
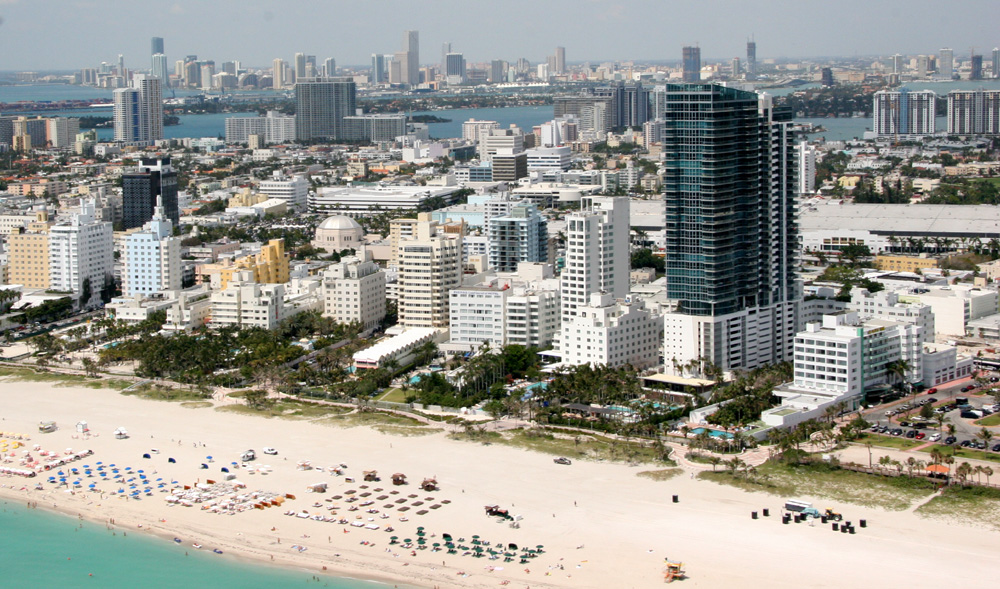
A music video for "Amazing" was filmed in Miami Beach.

A music video for "Good Morning Gorgeous" was directed by Eif Rivera and produced by Omar Reynoso for Fatking Films and Bruno Breil for ERG Designs. It premiered online on December 21, 2021. In the visuals, Blige and Khaled are seen throwing a lavish party at a palatial residence in Miami Beach. N.O.R.E., Trina, Angie Martinez, Misa Hylton, and Diddy make cameo appearances throughout the video.

== Credits and personnel ==
Credits adapted from the liner notes of Good Morning Gorgeous.

- Denisia Andrews – vocal producer, writer
- Tarik Azzouz – producer, writer
- Mary J. Blige – vocals, writer
- Willie Cobbs – writer
- Brittany Coney – vocal producer, writer
- Koedi Dalley – background vocalist
- Chris Galland – mixing engineer
- Pat Kelly – recording engineer
- DJ Khaled – producer, writer
- Ian Kimmel – engineering assistance
- Manny Marroquin – recording engineer
- Ellas McDaniels – writer
- Juan Peña – recording engineer
- Zach Pererya – mixing assistance
- Street Runner – producer, writer
- Anthony Vilchis – mixing assistance

== Charts ==
Weekly chart performance for "Amazing"
Chart (2021–22)	Peak position
US R&B/Hip-Hop Digital Song Sales (Billboard)	24

== Release history ==
Release history and formats for "Amazing"
Region	Date	Format(s)	Label	Ref
Various	December 3, 2021	Digital download	300; Mary Jane	
