= Mary J. Blige =

American singer and actress (born 1971)

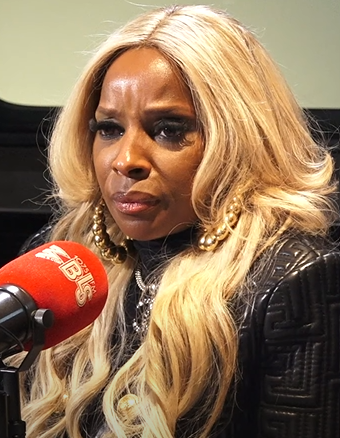
- Blige in 2022
- Born: Mary Jane Blige; January 11, 1971 (age 55); New York City, U.S.
- Other name: Brook Lynn
- Occupations: Singer; songwriter; actress; entrepreneur
- Years active: 1988–present
- Spouse: Kendu Isaacs (m. 2003; div. 2018)
- Awards: Full list
- Musical career
- Origin: Yonkers, New York, U.S.
- Genres: R&B; hip-hop; hip-hop soul; new jack swing; neo soul
- Instrument: Vocals
- Labels: Beautiful Life; Mary Jane; 300; Atlantic; Republic; Capitol; Matriarch; Geffen; Verve; Uptown; MCA
- Website: maryjblige.com

Mary Jane Blige (/blaɪdʒ/ BLYZHE; born January 11, 1971) is an American singer, songwriter, actress, and entrepreneur. Often referred to by the honorifics "Queen of Hip-Hop Soul" and "Queen of R&B", her accolades include nine Grammy Awards, a Primetime Emmy Award, four American Music Awards, twelve NAACP Image Awards, and twelve Billboard Music Awards, including the Billboard Icon Award.

Blige signed to Uptown Records in 1988. Her debut album, What's the 411? (1992), is credited for introducing the mix of R&B and hip hop into mainstream pop culture. Its 1993 remix album became the first album by a singer to have a rapper on every song, popularizing rap as a featuring act. Both What's the 411? and her 1994 album My Life ranked among Rolling Stone's 500 Greatest Albums of All Time list. Throughout her career, Blige has released 15 studio albums, four of which―Share My World (1997), Love & Live (2003), The Breakthrough (2005) and Growing Pains (2007)―have topped the Billboard 200 chart. Her biggest hits include "Real Love", "You Remind Me", "I'm Goin' Down", "Not Gon' Cry", "Everything", "No More Drama", "Be Without You", "One" (with U2), "Just Fine" and the Billboard Hot 100 number-one single "Family Affair".

Blige enhanced her popularity with an acting career. She was nominated for two Academy Awards for her supporting role as Florence Jackson in Mudbound (2017) and the film's song "Mighty River", becoming the first person nominated for acting and songwriting in the same year. Her other film roles include Prison Song (2001), Rock of Ages (2012), Betty and Coretta (2013), Black Nativity (2013), Trolls World Tour (2020), Body Cam (2020), The Violent Heart (2021), Respect (2021) and Rob Peace (2024). Her television work includes the series The Umbrella Academy (2019) and Power Book II: Ghost (2020–2024).

One of the world's best selling artists, Blige received a Legends Award at the World Music Awards in 2006, the Voice of Music Award from ASCAP in 2007 and a star on the Hollywood Walk of Fame in 2018. In 2010, Billboard ranked her as the most successful female R&B/Hip-Hop artist of the past 25 years. In 2017, the magazine named "Be Without You" as the most successful R&B/hip-hop song of all time, as it spent a then-record 15 weeks atop the Hot R&B/Hip-Hop Songs chart and over 75 weeks on the chart overall. Blige was featured in listicles such as VH1's 100 Greatest Artists of All Time (2011), Time's 100 most influential people in the world (2022) and Rolling Stone's 200 Greatest Singers of All Time (2023). In 2024, she was inducted into the Rock and Roll Hall of Fame.

== Life and music career ==
=== 1971–1991: Early life and career beginnings ===
Mary Jane Blige was born on January 11, 1971, at Fordham Hospital in the Belmont neighborhood in the Bronx, New York City, to nurse Cora and jazz musician Thomas Blige. She has an older sister, LaTonya Blige-DaCosta; a younger half-brother, Bruce Miller; and a younger half-sister, Jonquell; both from a relationship Blige's mother had with another man after divorcing her first husband.

Blige spent her early childhood in Richmond Hill, Georgia, where she sang in a Pentecostal church. She and her family later moved back to New York and resided in the Schlobohm Housing Projects, located in Nodine Hill, New York in the city of Yonkers. The family subsisted on her mother's earnings as a nurse after her father left the family in the mid-1970s. Her father was a Vietnam War veteran who suffered from post-traumatic stress disorder and alcoholism.

At age five, she was molested by a family friend; as a teenager she endured years of sexual harassment from her peers. She said these negative experiences prepared her to protect herself in the music industry, where sexual harassment is a major problem for female artists. She would eventually turn to alcohol, drugs and promiscuous sex to try to numb the pain. Blige dropped out of high school in her junior year.

Influenced by the music of Aretha Franklin, Chaka Khan and Gladys Knight, she began pursuing a musical career. Blige spent a short time in a Yonkers band named Pride with band drummer Eddie D'Aprile. In early 1988, she recorded an impromptu cover of Anita Baker's "Caught Up in the Rapture" at a recording booth in the Galleria Mall in White Plains, New York. Her mother's boyfriend at the time later played the cassette for Jeff Redd, a recording artist and A&R runner for Uptown Records. Redd sent it to the president and CEO of the label, Andre Harrell. Harrell met with Blige, and in 1989 at the age of 18, she was signed to the label as a backup vocalist for artists such as Father MC, becoming the company's youngest and first female artist.

=== 1992–1996: What's the 411? and My Life ===
After being signed to Uptown, Blige began working with record producer Sean Combs. He became the executive producer and produced a majority of her first album. The title What's the 411? was an indication by Blige of being the "real deal". What's the 411? established Blige as a dynamic storyteller whose performances of love narrative drew upon both her musical influences and her lived experiences as an icon of the hip-hop-generation. The music was described as "revelatory on a frequent basis". Blige was noted for having a "tough girl persona and streetwise lyrics". On July 28, 1992, Uptown/MCA Records released What's the 411?, to positive reviews from critics. What's the 411? peaked at number six on the Billboard 200 and topped the Top R&B/Hip-Hop Albums chart. It also peaked at number 53 on the UK Albums Chart. It was certified three times Platinum by the RIAA. According to Entertainment Weekly's Dave DiMartino, with the record's commercial success and Blige's "powerful, soulful voice and hip-hop attitude", she "solidly connected with an audience that has never seen a woman do new jack swing but loves it just the same". According to Dave McAleer, Blige became the most successful new female R&B artist of 1992 in the United States.

What's the 411? earned her two Soul Train Music Awards in 1993: Best New R&B Artist and Best R&B Album, Female. It was also voted the year's 30th best album in the Pazz & Jop—an annual poll of American critics nationwide, published by The Village Voice. By August 2010, the album had sold 3,318,000 copies in the US. What's the 411? has since been viewed by critics as one of the 1990s' most important records. Blige's combination of vocals over a hip hop beat proved influential in contemporary R&B. With the album, she was dubbed the reigning "Queen of Hip Hop Soul" The album's success spun off What's the 411? Remix, a remix album released in December that was used to extend the life of the What's the 411? singles on the radio into 1994, as Blige recorded her follow-up album.

Blige went into the recording studio in the winter of 1993 to record her second album, My Life. The album was a breakthrough for Blige, who at this point was in a clinical depression, battling both drugs and alcohol – as well as being in an abusive relationship with K-Ci Hailey. On November 29, 1994, Uptown/MCA released My Life to positive reviews. The album peaked at number seven on the US Billboard 200 and number one of the Top R&B/Hip-Hop Albums chart for selling 481,000 copies in its first week and remaining atop the Top R&B/Hip-Hop Albums chart for an unprecedented eight weeks. It ultimately spent 46 weeks on the Billboard 200 and 84 weeks on the R&B/Hip-Hop Albums chart. In 2002, My Life was ranked number 57 on Blender's list of the 100 greatest American albums of all time. The following year, Rolling Stone placed it at number 279 on their 500 Greatest Albums of All Time, and in 2006, the record was included in Time's 100 greatest albums of all-time list.

Blige involved herself in several outside projects, recording a cover of Aretha Franklin's "(You Make Me Feel Like) A Natural Woman" for the soundtrack to the FOX series New York Undercover, and "Everyday It Rains" (co-written by R&B singer Faith Evans) for the soundtrack to the hip hop documentary, The Show. Later in the year, she recorded the Babyface-penned and produced "Not Gon' Cry", for the soundtrack to the motion picture Waiting to Exhale. The platinum-selling single rose to number two on the Billboard Hot 100 and number one on the Hot R&B/Hip-Hop Songs in early 1996. Blige gained her first two Grammy nominations and won the 1996 Best Rap Performance by a Duo or Group for her collaboration with Method Man on "I'll Be There for You/You're All I Need to Get By". Shortly after, Blige was featured on Jay-Z's breakthrough single, "Can't Knock the Hustle", from his debut Reasonable Doubt (1996) and with Ghostface Killah on "All That I Got Is You" from his debut, Ironman, which was also released that year. In addition, Blige co-wrote four songs, provided background vocals and was featured prominently on two singles with fellow R&B singer Case on his self-titled debut album (1996) including the US top 20 hit, "Touch Me, Tease Me", which also featured then up-and-coming rapper Foxy Brown.

What's the 411? highlights the featuring of woman centered narratives although in this album her narratives were regularly policed and told through male emcees. Nonetheless, it marked the start of a transition towards black women centered narratives that focused on the daily experiences and troubles of the black experience through the lens of women rather than necessarily singing about black trauma. Treva B. Lindsey, in her piece "If You Look in My Life: Love, Hip-Hop Soul, and Contemporary African-American Womanhood", highlights the regulating by men saying, "Although the lyrics on What's the 411? establish an African American woman-centered discourse, male artists' words of adoration and longing first introduce listeners to Blige as a hip-hop storyteller. What's the 411?, therefore, functions as an African American woman-centered storytelling space created largely by black men."

=== 1997–2000: Share My World and Mary ===
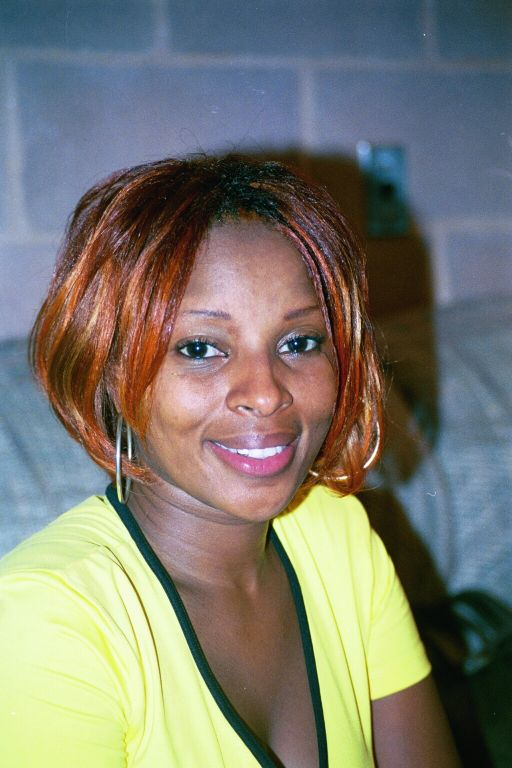
Blige in 1998

On April 22, 1997, MCA Records (parent company to Uptown Records, which was in the process of being dismantled) released Blige's third album, Share My World. By then, she and Combs had dissolved their working relationship. In his place were the Trackmasters, who executive-produced the project along with Steve Stoute. Sharing production duties were producers Jimmy Jam and Terry Lewis, R. Kelly, Babyface and Rodney Jerkins. The album was made at a time when Blige was trying to "get her life together", by trying to overcome drugs and alcohol, as well as the ending of her relationship with Hailey. After an encounter with a person who threatened her life the previous year, she tried to quit the unhealthy lifestyle and make more upbeat, happier music. As a result, songs such as "Love Is All We Need" and "Share My World" were made.

Share My World debuted at number one on the Billboard 200 and spawned five hit singles: "Love Is All We Need" (featuring Nas), "I Can Love You" (featuring Lil' Kim), "Everything", "Missing You" (UK only) and "Seven Days" (featuring George Benson). In February 1997, Blige performed her hit at the time, "Not Gon' Cry", at the 1997 Grammy Awards, which gained her a third Grammy Award nomination, her first for Best Female R&B Vocal Performance, as Blige was recording the follow-up to My Life. In early 1998, Blige won an American Music Award for "Favorite Soul/R&B Album". That summer, she embarked on the Share My World Tour, which resulted in a Gold-certified live album released later that year, simply titled The Tour. The album spawned one single, "Misty Blue".

On August 17, 1999, Blige's fourth album, titled Mary was released. It marked a departure from her more familiar hip hop-oriented sound; this set featured a more earthy, whimsical, and adult contemporary-tinged collection of songs, reminiscent of the 1970s to early 1980s soul. She also appeared on In Concert: A Benefit for the Crossroads Centre at Antigua with Eric Clapton in 1999. On December 14, 1999, the album was re-released as a double-disc set. The second disc was enhanced with the music videos for the singles "All That I Can Say" and "Deep Inside" and included two bonus tracks: "Sincerity" (featuring Nas, Andy Hogan and DMX) and "Confrontation" (a collaboration with hip hop duo Funkmaster Flex & Big Kap originally from their 1999 album The Tunnel).

The Mary album was critically praised, becoming her most nominated release to date, and was certified double platinum. It was not as commercially successful as Blige's prior releases, though all of the singles: "All That I Can Say", "Deep Inside", "Your Child", and "Give Me You" performed considerably on the radio. In the meantime, MCA used the album to expand Blige's demographic into the nightclub market, as club-friendly dance remixes of the Mary singles were released. The club remix of "Your Child" peaked at number-one on the Billboard's Hot Dance Club Play chart in October 2000. In 2001, a Japan-only compilation, Ballads, was released. The album featured covers of Stevie Wonder's "Overjoyed", and previous recordings of Aretha Franklin's "(You Make Me Feel Like) A Natural Woman" and Dorothy Moore's "Misty Blue". In 1999, George Michael and Mary J. Blige covered the song 'As' written by Stevie Wonder, and worldwide outside of the United States, it was the second single from George Michael's greatest hits album Ladies & Gentlemen: The Best of George Michael. It became a top ten UK pop hit, reaching number four on the chart. It was not released on the U.S. version of the greatest hits collection or as a single in the U.S. Michael cited Blige's record company president for pulling the track in America after Michael's arrest for committing a lewd act. In January 2001, Blige performed as a special guest in the Super Bowl XXXV halftime show.

=== 2001–2004: No More Drama and Love & Life ===
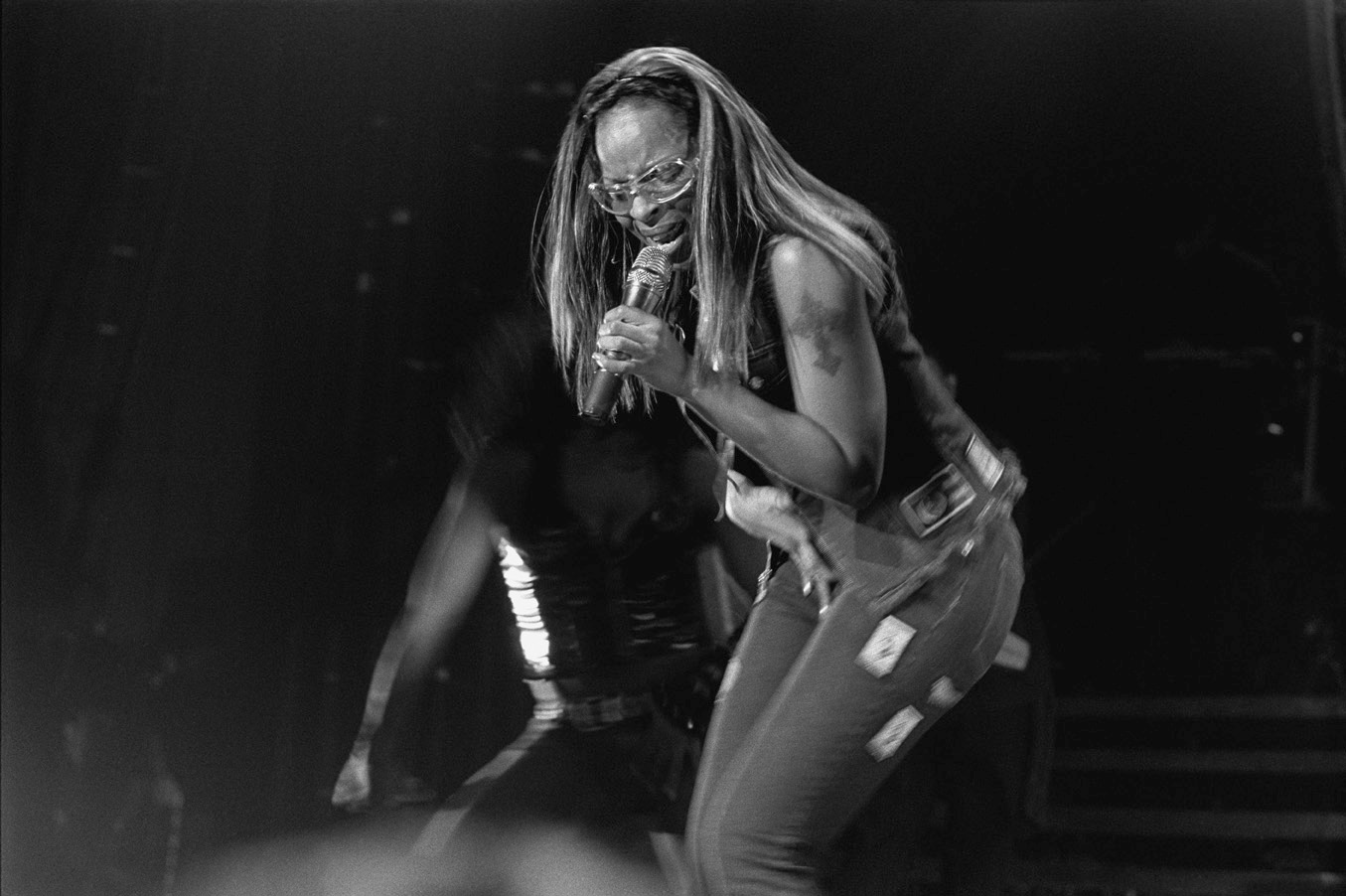
Blige in Hamburg, Germany, 2000

On August 28, 2001, MCA released Blige's fifth studio album, No More Drama. The first single in the album, "Family Affair" (produced by Dr. Dre) became her first and only number-one single on the Billboard Hot 100, where it remained for six consecutive weeks. It was followed by two further hit singles, the European-only single "Dance for Me" featuring Common with samples from "The Bed's Too Big Without You" by The Police, and the Jimmy Jam and Terry Lewis-produced title track (originally recorded for the Mary album), which sampled "Nadia's Theme", the piano-driven theme song to the daytime drama The Young and the Restless. Though the album sold nearly two million copies in the U.S., MCA was underwhelmed by its sales, and subsequently repackaged and re-released the album on January 29, 2002. The No More Drama re-release featured a new album cover and deleted three of the songs from the original track listing, while adding two brand-new songs—one of which was the fourth single and top twenty Hot 100 hit "Rainy Dayz", (featuring Ja Rule), plus two remixes; one of the title track, serviced by Combs and the single version of "Dance for Me" featuring Common. Blige won a Grammy for 'Best Female R&B Vocal Performance' for the song "He Think I Don't Know". In April 2002, Blige performed with Shakira with the song "Love Is a Battlefield" on VH1 Divas show live in Las Vegas, she also performed "No More Drama" and "Rainy Dayz" as a duet with the returning Whitney Houston.

On July 22, 2002, MCA released Dance for Me, a collection of club remixes of some of her past top hits including the Junior Vasquez remix of "Your Child", and the Thunderpuss mix of "No More Drama". This album was released in a limited edition double pack 12" vinyl for DJ-friendly play in nightclubs.

On August 26, 2003, Blige's sixth album Love & Life was released on Geffen Records (which had absorbed MCA Records.) Blige heavily collaborated with her one-time producer Combs for this set. Due to the history between them on What's the 411? and My Life, which is generally regarded as their best work, and Blige having just come off of a successful fifth album, expectations were high for the reunion effort.

Despite the album debuting at number one on the Billboard 200 and becoming Blige's fourth consecutive UK top ten album, Love & Life's lead-off single, the Combs-produced "Love @ 1st Sight", which featured Method Man, barely cracked the top ten on the Hot R&B/Hip-Hop Songs, while altogether missing the top twenty on the Hot 100 (although peaking inside the UK top twenty). The following singles, "Ooh!", "Not Today" featuring Eve, "Whenever I Say Your Name" featuring Sting on the international re-release, and "It's a Wrap" fared worse. Although the album was certified platinum, it became Blige's lowest-selling at the time. Critics and fans alike largely panned the disc, citing a lack of consistency and noticeable ploys to recapture the early Blige/Combs glory. Blige and Combs reportedly struggled and clashed during the making of this album, and again parted ways upon the completion of it.

The album became Blige's first album in six years to debut at number one on the Billboard 200, selling 285,298 copies in the first week. Love & Life received mixed reviews from music critics. AllMusic gave it 4 stars and said the album "beamed with joy" and Rolling Stone gave it three stars, saying "You may not always love Blige's music, but you will feel her". The album was eventually certified Platinum by the RIAA for shipping over 1,000,000 copies in the US. The album was nominated for the Best Contemporary R&B Album at the 46th Grammy Awards.

=== 2005–2006: The Breakthrough and Reflections – A Retrospective ===
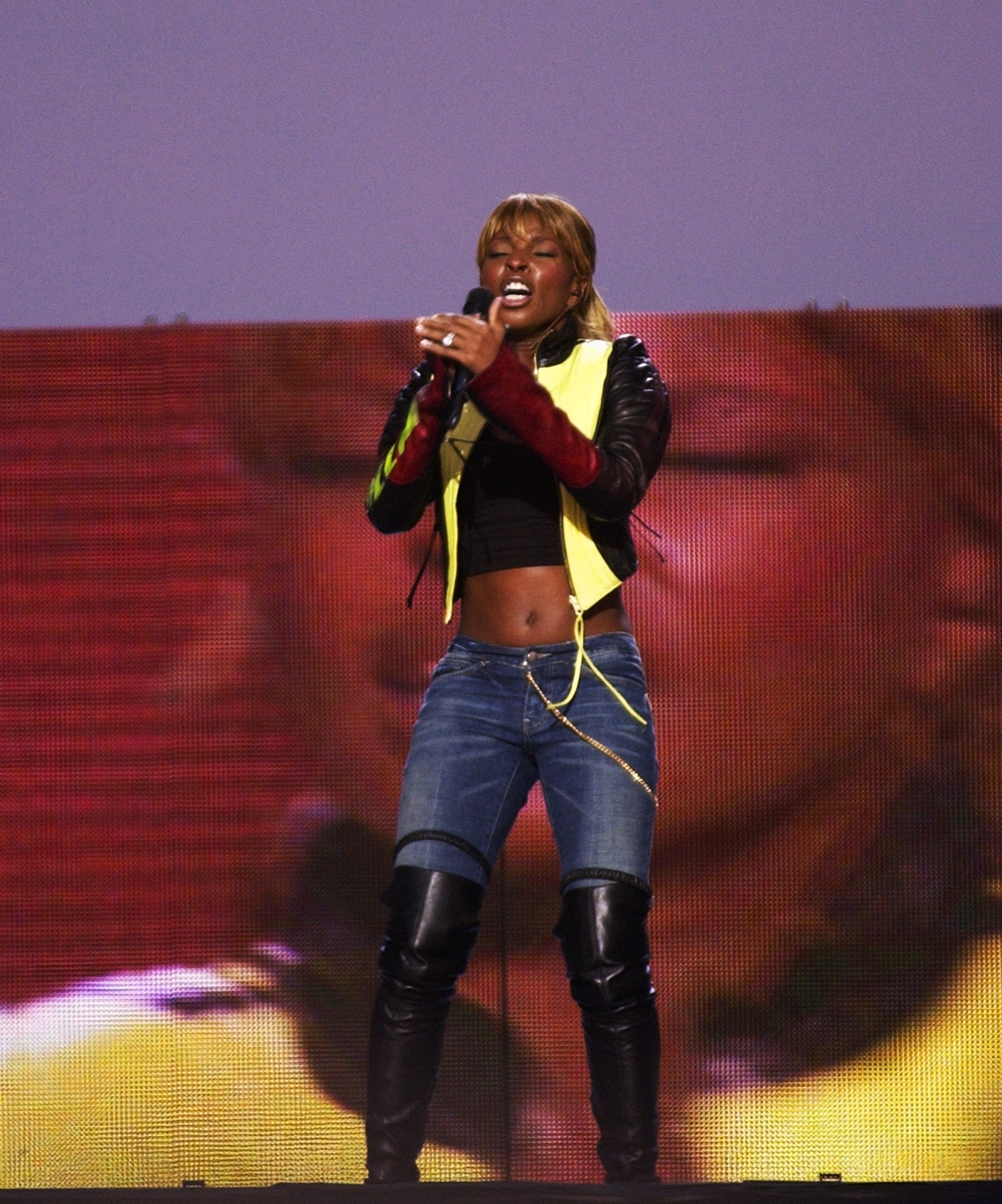
Blige performing during the NFL Kickoff game in September 2003 in Washington, D.C.

Geffen Records released Blige's seventh studio album, The Breakthrough on December 20, 2005. For the album, Blige collaborated with J.U.S.T.I.C.E. League, Rodney Jerkins, will.i.am, Bryan-Michael Cox, 9th Wonder, Jimmy Jam and Terry Lewis, Raphael Saadiq, Cool and Dre, and Dre & Vidal. The cover art was photographed by Markus Klinko & Indrani. It debuted at number one on both the Billboard 200 and Top R&B/Hip-Hop Albums charts. Selling 727,000 copies in its first week, it became the biggest first-week sales for an R&B solo female artist in SoundScan history, the fifth largest first-week sales for a female artist, and the fourth largest debut of 2005.

The lead-off single, "Be Without You", peaked at number three on the Billboard Hot 100, while peaking at number one on the R&B chart for a record-setting fifteen consecutive weeks; it remained on the chart for over sixteen months. "Be Without You" found success in the UK (peaking in the lower end of the top forty) it became Blige's longest charting single on the UK Singles Chart. It is her second-longest charting single to date. The album produced three more singles including two more top-five R&B hits—"Enough Cryin'", which features Blige's alter ego Brook Lynn (as whom she appeared on the remix to Busta Rhymes's "Touch It" in 2006); and "Take Me as I Am" (which samples Lonnie Liston Smith's "A Garden of Peace"). Blige's duet with U2 on the cover of their 1992 hit, "One" gave Blige her biggest hit to date in the UK, peaking at number two on the UK Singles Chart eventually being certified one of the forty highest-selling singles of 2006; it was her longest charting UK single. The success of The Breakthrough won Blige nine Billboard Music Awards, two American Music Awards, two BET Awards, two NAACP Image Awards, and a Soul Train Award. She received eight Grammy Award nominations at the 2007 Grammy Awards, the most of any artist that year. "Be Without You" was nominated for both "Record of the Year" and "Song of the Year". Blige won three: "Best Female R&B Vocal Performance", "Best R&B Song" (both for "Be Without You"), and "Best R&B Album" for The Breakthrough. Blige completed a season sweep of the "big three" major music awards, having won two American Music Awards in November 2006 and nine Billboard Music Awards in December 2006.

In December 2006, a compilation called Reflections (A Retrospective) was released. It contained many of Blige's greatest hits and four new songs, including the worldwide lead single "We Ride (I See the Future)". In the UK, however, "MJB da MVP" (which appeared in a different, shorter form on The Breakthrough) was released as the lead single from the collection. The album peaked at number nine in the U.S., selling over 170,000 copies in its first week, while reaching number forty in the UK In 2006, Blige recorded a duet with rapper Ludacris, "Runaway Love", which is the third single on his fifth album, Release Therapy. It reached the top five on the Billboard Hot 100 and the R&B chart. Blige was featured with Aretha Franklin and the Harlem Boys Choir on the soundtrack to the 2006 motion picture Bobby, on the lead track "Never Gonna Break My Faith" written by Bryan Adams. The song was nominated for a Golden Globe and won the Grammy Award for Best Gospel Performance at the 50th Annual Grammy Awards.

=== 2007–2008: Growing Pains ===
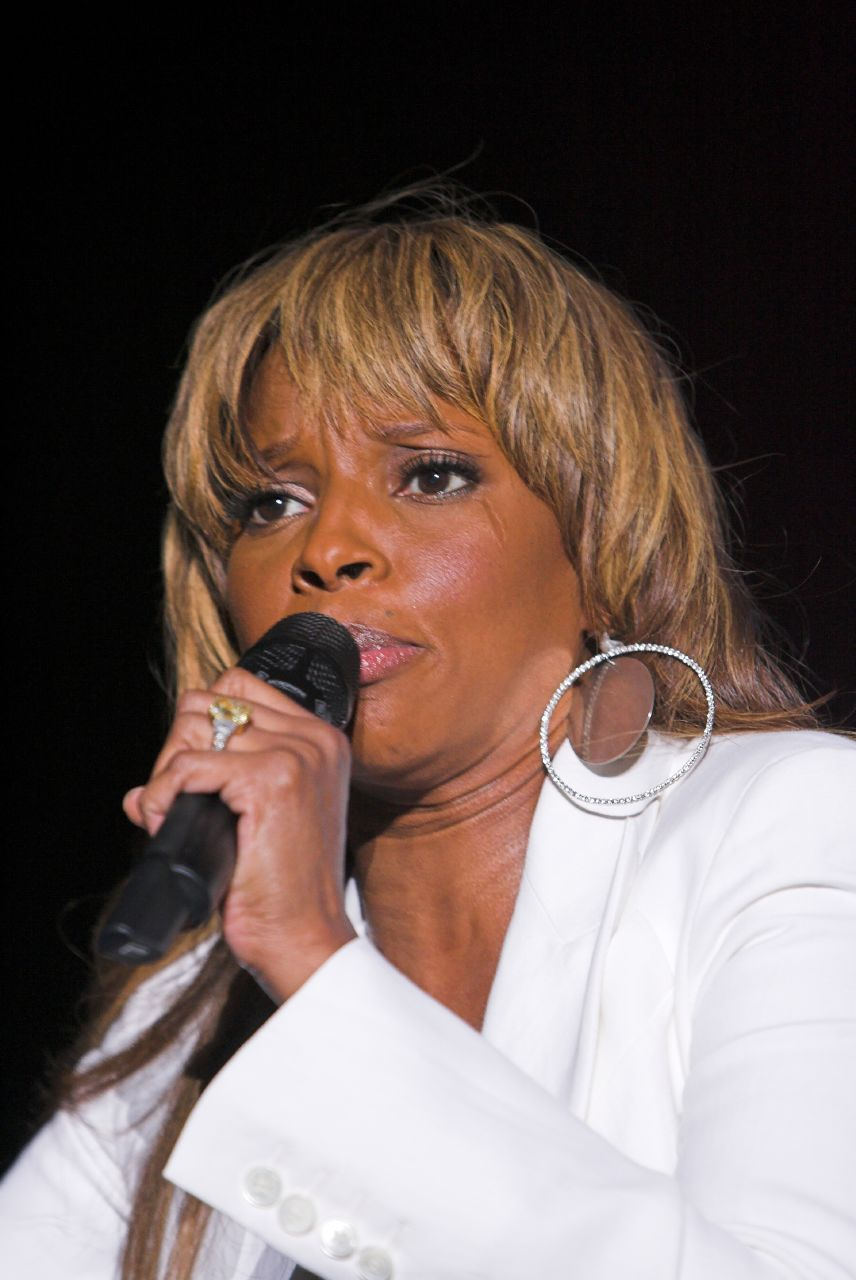
Blige performing in July 2007

Blige's eighth studio album, Growing Pains, was released on December 18, 2007, debuting at number two on the Billboard 200 and at number one on the Top R&B/Hip-Hop Albums chart. It sold 629,000 copies in its first week, marking the third time since Nielsen SoundScan began collecting data in 1991 that two albums sold more than 600,000 copies in a week in the United States. In its second week, the album climbed to number one, making it Blige's fourth number-one album. The lead single, "Just Fine", peaked at number twenty-two on the Billboard Hot 100 and at number three on the Hot R&B/Hip-Hop Songs chart. "Just Fine" was nominated for the Grammy Award for Best Female R&B Vocal Performance, and Blige won Best R&B Performance by a Duo or Group with Vocals for the Chaka Khan duet "Disrespectful" (featured on Khan's album Funk This) which Blige wrote.

Growing Pains was not released in the UK until February 2008, where it became Blige's fifth top ten and third-highest-charting album. "Just Fine" returned Blige to the UK singles chart top 20 after her previous two singles failed to chart highly. Subsequent singles from Growing Pains include "Work That", which accompanied Blige in an iTunes commercial, and "Stay Down".

Blige was featured on 50 Cent's 2007 album, Curtis, in the song "All of Me". In March 2008, she toured with Jay-Z on the Heart of the City Tour. Together, they released a song called "You're Welcome". In the same period, cable network BET aired a special on Blige titled The Evolution of Mary J. Blige, which showcased her career. Celebrities such as Method Man and Ashanti gave their opinions about Blige and her music. Blige is featured on singles by Big Boi, and Musiq Soulchild. Growing Pains was nominated for and won the Grammy Award for "Best Contemporary R&B Album", at the 51st Grammy Awards held on February 8, 2009, earning Blige her 27th Grammy nomination, in a mere decade. Blige went on the Growing Pains European Tour, her first tour there in two years. A tour of Australia and New Zealand was scheduled for June but was postponed due to "weariness from an overwhelming tour schedule" and then eventually canceled entirely. On August 7, 2008, it was revealed Blige faced a US$2 million federal suit claiming Neff-U wrote the music for the song "Work That", but was owned by Dream Family Entertainment. The filing claimed that Dream Family never gave rights to use the song to Blige, Feemster or Geffen Records. Rights to the lyrics of the song used in an iPod commercial are not in question.

=== 2009–2010: Stronger with Each Tear ===
Blige returned to performing in January 2009 by performing the song "Lean on Me" at the Presidential Inauguration Committee's, "We Are One: The Obama Inaugural Celebration at the Lincoln Memorial". Blige also performed her hit 2007 single, "Just Fine", with a new intro at the Neighborhood Inaugural Ball after Barack Obama was sworn in on January 20, 2009. Blige appeared as a marquee performer on the annual Christmas in Washington television special.

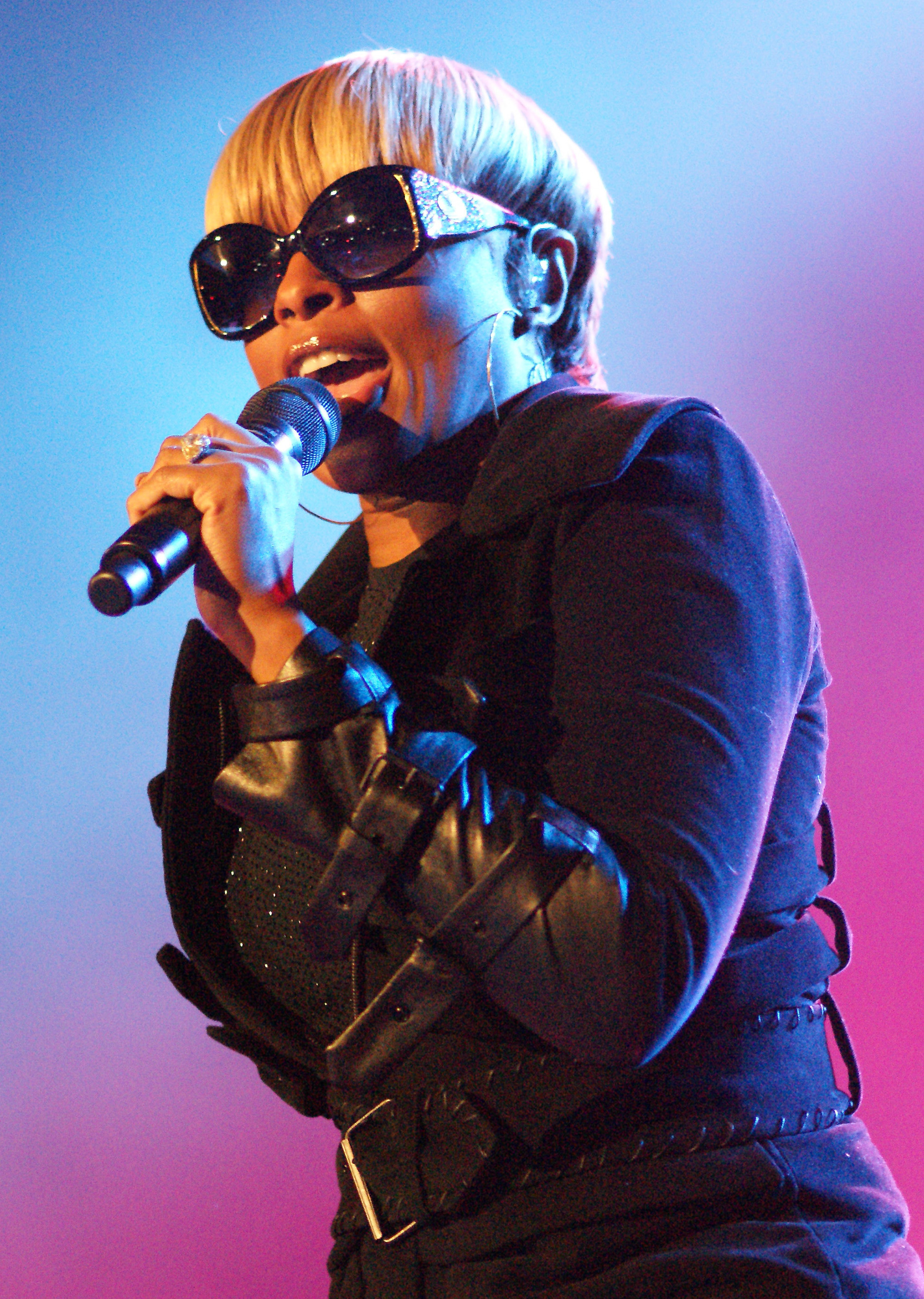
Blige performing at Bumbershoot in September 2010

Blige's ninth studio album, Stronger with Each Tear, was released on December 21, 2009, debuting at number two on the Billboard 200 and at number one on the Top R&B/Hip-Hop Albums chart, selling 332,000 units in its first week of release. It became her fifth album not to take the top spot in the United States. Blige recorded "Stronger", as the lead single from the soundtrack to the basketball documentary "More than a Game" in August 2009. The second single from Stronger with Each Tear, "I Am", was released in December 2009 and reached number fifty-five on the Hot 100. The third international single from the album, "Each Tear", was remixed with different featured artists from different countries, then being released in February 2010. The single failed to chart anywhere except in the UK where it reached number one-hundred-eighty-three and in Italy where it reached number one. The album's third U.S. single, "We Got Hood Love" featuring Trey Songz, was released in March 2010 and reached number tw25 on the Hot R&B/Hip-Hop Singles chart though it failed to reach the Hot 100. One of Blige's representatives reported to Us Weekly magazine that a tour in support of Stronger with Each Tear would begin in the fall of 2010. In March 2010, Blige released Stronger with Each Tear in the United Kingdom, as well as in the European markets. The album performed modestly in the United Kingdom, debuting at number 33 on the UK Albums Chart and at number four on the UK R&B Chart. It reached the top 100 in other countries.

Blige was honored at the 2009 BET Honors Ceremony and was paid tribute by Anita Baker and Monica. On November 4, 2009, Blige sang The Star-Spangled Banner at Yankee Stadium before the New York Yankees and Philadelphia Phillies played the last game (game 6) of the World Series. Blige performed two songs from her ninth album as well as her previous hits, "No More Drama" and "Be Without You" along with the song "Color", which was featured on the Precious soundtrack. Blige appeared as a guest judge on the ninth season of American Idol on January 13, 2010.

On January 23, Blige released a track titled "Hard Times Come Again No More" with the Roots, performing it at the Hope for Haiti Now telethon. Blige also performed on BET's SOS Help For Haiti, singing "Gonna Make It" with Jazmine Sullivan and "One." At the 2010 Grammy Awards, Blige performed "Bridge over Troubled Water" with Andrea Bocelli. She also took part in February 2010's We Are the World 25 for Haiti, singing the solo originally sung by Tina Turner in the original 1985 We Are the World version. At the 41st NAACP Image Awards on February 26, Blige won Outstanding Female Artist and Outstanding Album for Stronger with Each Tear. On November 18, 2010, Billboard revealed Mary J. Blige as the most successful female R&B/hip hop artist on the Top 50 R&B/Hip Hop Artists of the Past 25 Years list. She came in at number 2 overall.

=== 2011–2013: My Life II... The Journey Continues (Act 1) and A Mary Christmas ===
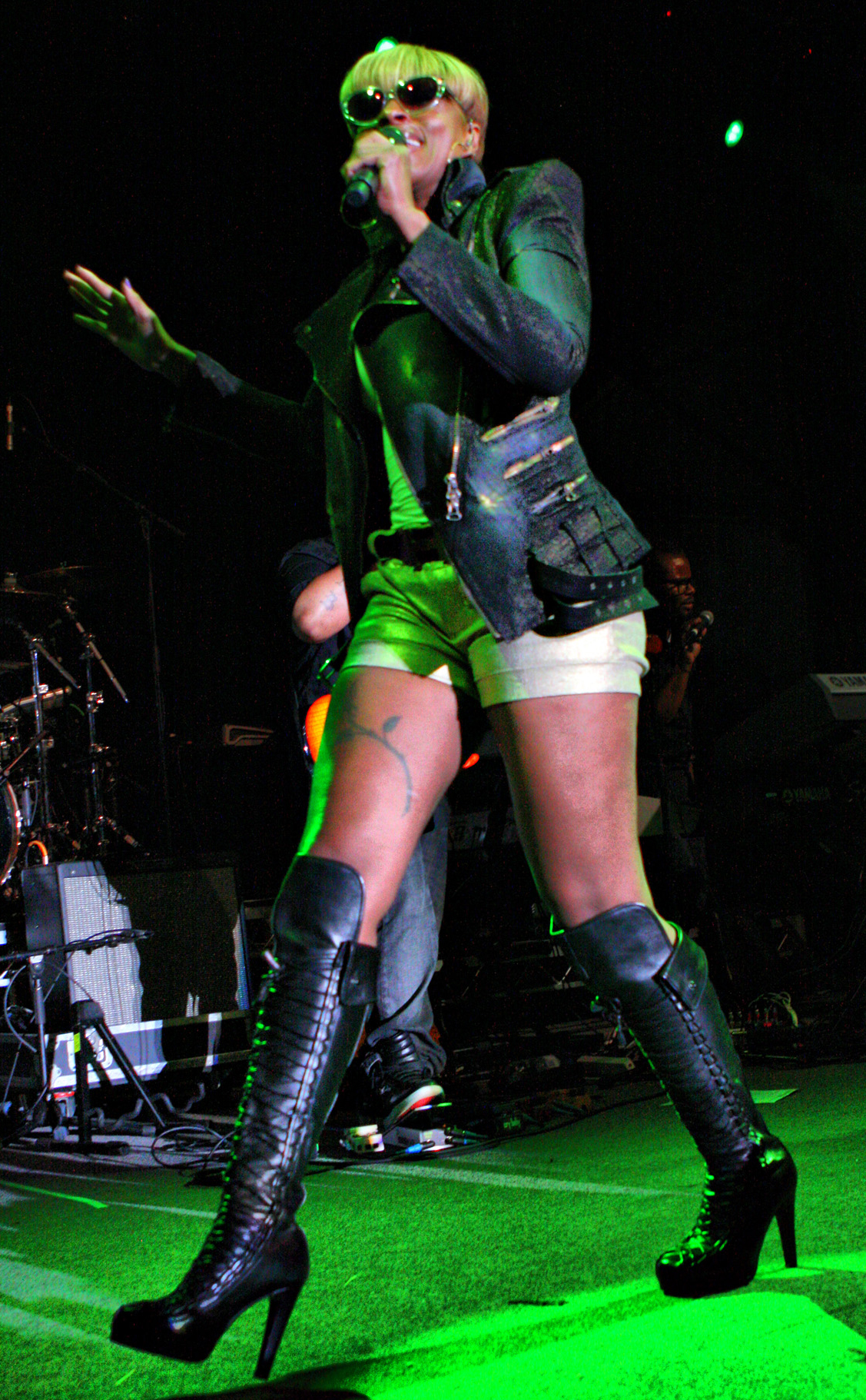
Blige onstage at the Raggamuffin Festival in Sydney, Australia in January 2011

In January 2011, Hot 97 premiered Blige's teaser track "Someone to Love Me (Naked)" featuring vocals by Lil Wayne. In July 2011, Blige released the song "The Living Proof" as the lead single to the soundtrack of the film The Help. On July 24, VH1 premiered their third Behind the Music that profiled her personal and career life. In August 2011, Blige released her first single off the album, "25/8". Blige's tenth studio album, My Life II... The Journey Continues (Act 1), was released in November 2011. The album, primarily recorded in Los Angeles and New York City, saw Blige looking toward the future while acknowledging the past. "From me to you, My Life II... Our journey together continues in this life", the singer explained. "It's a gift to be able to relate and identify with my fans at all times. This album is a reflection of the times and lives of people all around me." The album features production by Kanye West and the Underdogs. The second single "Mr. Wrong" featuring Canadian rapper Drake was the most successful single from the album, peaking at number 10 on Billboard's R&B/Hip-Hop Songs chart. The rest of the songs released, including lead single "25/8" achieved only moderate success, peaking within the top 40 on R&B/Hip-Hop Songs. The album itself debuted at No. 5 on the Billboard 200, selling 156,000 copies in the first week; it was eventually certified Gold in 2012 and has sold 763,000 in the US.

On February 28, 2012, Blige performed "Star Spangled Banner" at the 2012 NBA All-Star Game. Blige appeared as guest mentor on American Idol on March 7, 2012, and performed "Why" on the results show the following night. On September 23, 2012, Blige was a performer at the iHeartRadio Music Festival at the MGM Grand Las Vegas. Blige was featured on the song "Now or Never" from Kendrick Lamar's album Good Kid, M.A.A.D City, released on October 22, 2012.

In early 2013, reports surfaced that Blige was recording a Christmas album. The album, titled, A Mary Christmas was released on October 15, 2013, through Matriarch and Verve Records, her first release with the latter. The album includes collaborations with Barbra Streisand, the Clark Sisters, Marc Anthony and Jessie J. In early December, A Mary Christmas became Blige's 12th top ten album after it rose to No. 10 in its eight week. On October 23, 2013, Blige sang the national anthem before Game 1 of the 2013 World Series.

=== 2014–2020: The London Sessions and Strength of a Woman ===
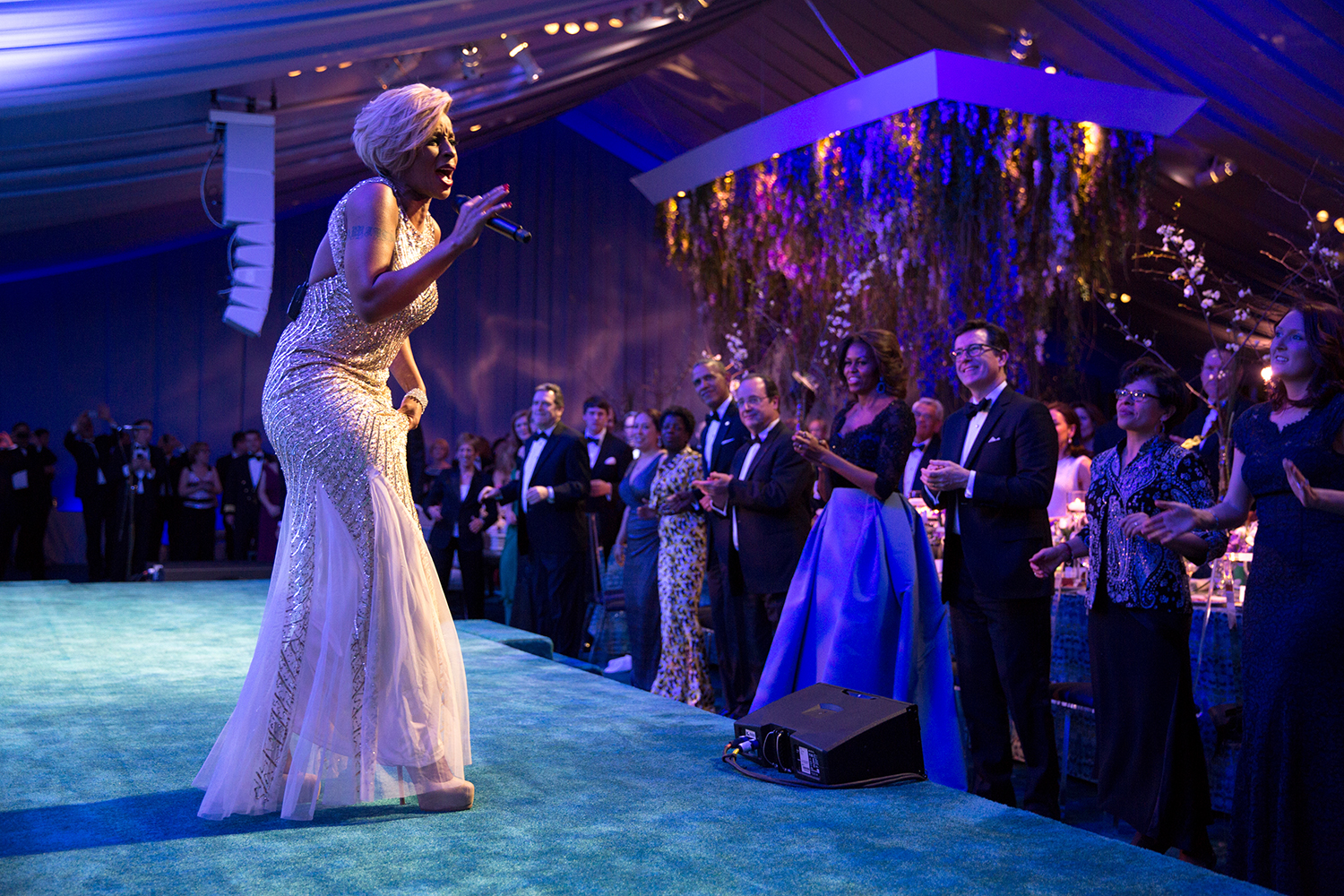
Blige performing State Dinner for President François Hollande of France, 2014

On February 5, 2014, a remix of Disclosure's "F for You" featuring guest vocals from Mary was released. In May 2014 Blige was featured on Mariah Carey's song "It's a Wrap" as part of Carey's deluxe edition of her 2014 album Me. I Am Mariah... The Elusive Chanteuse. It was announced May 30, 2014, that Think Like a Man Too (Music from and Inspired by the Film), released June 17 on Epic Records, would introduce new songs by Mary J. Blige, including the single "Suitcase". Blige recorded a collection of music from and inspired by the film. In the United States, Think Like a Man Too debuted at number 30 on the Billboard 200, with 8,688 copies sold in its first week, becoming the lowest sales debut of any of her studio albums. On Billboard's R&B/Hip-Hop chart, the soundtrack album charted at number six, marking Blige's 16th top ten entry on the chart, tying her with Mariah Carey for the second-most top tens by a female artist. Blige collaborated with another English musician on a reworked version of Sam Smith's "Stay with Me", which was released on June 2, 2014. An accompanying live visual to the song premiered the same day.

Following her concert date at the Essence Festival, on July 9, 2014, it was announced Blige would move to London to experiment with a new sound for her new album. Blige spent a month in London recording her album in RAK Studios with a host of young British acts, including Disclosure, Naughty Boy, Emeli Sandé and Sam Smith. Ten new songs, co-written and recorded by the singer, were released on November 24, 2014, on an album titled The London Sessions. That same month, she announced that she left Geffen and Interscope and signed with Capitol Records.

In August 2016, Blige was recruited to perform the new theme song for the ABC Daytime talk show The View for its twentieth season titled "World's Gone Crazy" written by Diane Warren. A music video was also shot for the new theme song with co-hosts Whoopi Goldberg, Joy Behar, Candace Cameron Bure, Raven-Symoné, Paula Faris, Sara Haines, Sunny Hostin and Jedediah Bila. Blige also appeared on The View alongside Maxwell during its premiere week on September 9, 2016, to discuss their joint tour and theme song. On September 30, 2016, Blige premiered a new show, The 411, on Apple Music. On its debut episode, she interviewed Hillary Clinton. A trailer was released online with Blige singing a cover of Bruce Springsteen's "American Skin" to a bewildered Clinton. The exchange received mixed and negative reaction on social media. Two weeks later, a studio version, this time featuring a verse from American rapper Kendrick Lamar was released online.

In October 2016, following her highly publicized divorce from Kendu Issacs, Blige released two songs: "Thick of It" and "U + Me (Love Lesson)". Her thirteenth studio album, Strength of a Woman, was released on April 28, 2017. It peaked at number three on the Billboard 200, number two on the Top R&B/Hip-Hop Albums chart and topped the R&B Albums chart. On July 12, 2018, Blige released the single "Only Love" on Republic Records, following her exit from Capitol Records.

On April 16, 2019, Blige announced that she is co-headlining a North American summer tour with Nas titled The Royalty Tour. On May 8, Blige released the single "Thriving" featuring Nas. During an interview with Ebro Darden on Beats 1 for the premiere of "Thriving", Blige announced that her next studio album would be released before July. On June 23, at the 2019 BET Awards, she was honored with the Lifetime Achievement Award for her extraordinary contributions to the music industry.

=== 2021–present: Good Morning Gorgeous, Super Bowl LVI halftime show and Gratitude ===
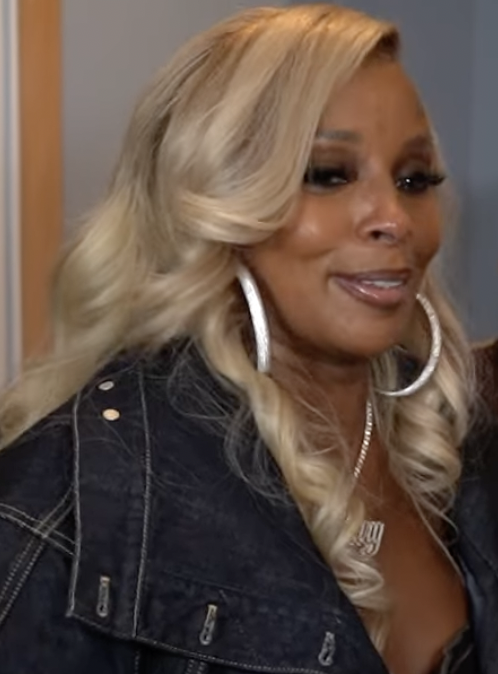
Blige in 2023

In June 2021, Blige celebrated the 25th anniversary of her album My Life with the release of the Amazon Studios documentary Mary J. Blige's My Life, directed by Vanessa Roth. In December 2021, it was announced that Blige had formed her own label, Mary Jane Productions, in conjunction with 300 Entertainment. Along with the news came the release of two new singles, "Good Morning Gorgeous" and "Amazing" featuring DJ Khaled. In January 2022, Blige released "Rent Money" featuring Dave East. The songs appear on Blige's fourteenth studio album, also titled Good Morning Gorgeous, which was released on February 11, 2022. The deluxe version of the album later became her only release to be nominated for the Grammy Award for Album of the Year.

On February 13, 2022, Blige performed at the Super Bowl LVI halftime show alongside fellow American rappers Dr. Dre, Eminem, Kendrick Lamar, Snoop Dogg, 50 Cent, and Anderson .Paak. The show earned her the Primetime Emmy Award for Outstanding Variety Special (Live). On February 17, Blige said on the radio show The Breakfast Club that she is working on an album entirely produced by Dr. Dre. On March 7, Blige and Pepsi announced the inaugural Strength of a Woman Festival and Summit, a three-day festival in Atlanta, in partnership with Live Nation Urban. In May 2022, she was listed as one of the 100 most influential people in the world by TIME. In October 2023, Blige released a deluxe version of A Mary Christmas, which included four additional tracks. She also released the single "Still Believe in Love", which features rapper Vado.

In 2023, Blige began her partnership with Lifetime, becoming the executive producer of original films inspired by her music. That same year, three movies―Real Love, Family Affair and Strength of a Woman―have been released. A fourth movie, Be Happy, debuted on February 7, 2026.

Blige's fifteenth studio album, Gratitude, was released on November 15, 2024. The following year, she also embarked on the For My Fans Tour in support for the album. Her live performances went viral on social media, with online users mocking Blige for appearing disinterested in performing. She later stated in an interview: "I was exhausted. I was kind of over everything. I was just tired." The tour ranked as the fifth highest-grossing R&B tour of 2025. Mary J. Blige: For My Fans, Live From Madison Square Garden, a concert film commemorating Blige's first ever live show at Madison Square Garden, was released theatrically on November 5 and 8.

Blige's first-ever Las Vegas residency, Mary J. Blige: My Life, My Story, is set to commence on May 1, 2026, at the Dolby Live.

== Acting career ==
=== 1998–2016: Early works ===
In 1998, Blige made her acting debut on the sitcom The Jamie Foxx Show, playing the apparently southern Ola Mae, a preacher's daughter who wanted to sing more than gospel music. Her father was portrayed by Ronald Isley of the Isley Brothers. In 2001, Blige starred opposite rapper Q-Tip in the independent film Prison Song. That same year, Blige made a cameo on the Lifetime network series, Strong Medicine; playing the role of Simone Fellows, the lead singer of a band who was sick, but would not seek treatment. In 2000, Blige was featured in a superhero web cartoon in junction with Stan Lee. Blige used the cartoon as part of her performance while on her 2000 Mary Show Tour. In 2004, Blige starred in an Off-Broadway play, The Exonerated, which chronicled the experiences of death row inmates. Blige portrayed Sunny Jacobs, a woman who spent 20 years in prison for a crime she did not commit. In late 2005, it was reported that Blige landed the starring role in the upcoming MTV Films biopic on American singer/pianist and civil rights activist, Nina Simone. By the spring of 2010, Blige was slated to star as Simone with British actor David Oyelowo portraying her manager Clifton Henderson. Blige later dropped out of the role due to financial issues and the role was subsequently recast with actress Zoe Saldaña as Simone in Nina, released in 2016.

In February 2007, Blige guest-starred on Ghost Whisperer, in the episode "Mean Ghost", as the character Jackie Boyd, the school's cheerleader coach grieving for the death of her brother and affected by the ghost of a dead cheerleader. The episode features many of Blige's songs. In August 2007, Blige was a guest star on Entourage, in the role of herself, as a client of Ari Gold's agency. In October 2007, Blige was also a guest star on America's Next Top Model, as a creative director for a photoshoot by Matthew Rolston. In May 2009, Mary made a guest appearance on 30 Rock, as an artist recording a benefit song for a kidney. Blige also had a supporting role in Tyler Perry's movie I Can Do Bad All by Myself, which was released in September 2009.

Blige starred alongside Tom Cruise, Julianne Hough, and Alec Baldwin in the 2012 film adaptation of the 1980s jukebox musical Rock of Ages. Blige played Justice Charlier, the owner of a Sunset Strip gentlemen's club. Production began in May 2011 and the film was released in June 2012.

Blige starred in the Lifetime movie Betty and Coretta alongside Angela Bassett, Malik Yoba and Lindsay Owen Pierre. She played Dr. Betty Shabazz, the widow of Malcolm X. The film premiered in February 2013. In December 2015, she portrayed Evillene, the Wicked Witch of the West in NBC's The Wiz Live!. In October 2016, Blige guest-starred on ABC legal drama How to Get Away with Murder as an old acquaintance of Annalise Keating played by Viola Davis.

=== 2017–present: Breakthrough with Mudbound and television roles ===
In 2017, Blige starred in the period drama film Mudbound directed by Dee Rees. Playing Florence Jackson, the matriarch of her family, she received praise such as Variety's review: "Mary J. Blige, as the mother of the Jackson family, gives a transformative performance that will elevate the acting career of the R&B star." For her performance in Mudbound, Blige was nominated for the Golden Globe Award for Best Supporting Actress, the Critics' Choice Movie Award for Best Supporting Actress, the Screen Actors Guild Award for Outstanding Performance by a Female Actor in a Supporting Role, and the Academy Award for Best Supporting Actress. As she was also nominated for the Academy Award for Best Original Song (with Taura Stinson and Raphael Saadiq), she became the first person nominated for an Academy Award for acting and original song in the same year. Her nomination also made Dee Rees the first black woman to direct a film for which an actor was nominated for an Academy Award.

Blige voiced Irene in the 2018 animated film Sherlock Gnomes, and in 2020 voiced Queen Essence in the animated musical film Trolls World Tour. In 2018, it was announced that Blige was cast as Sherry Elliot in Scream: Resurrection, the third season of the slasher television series Scream. The season premiered on VH1 on July 8, 2019. In 2019, Blige starred in the role of Cha-Cha, a main antagonist in the Netflix superhero series The Umbrella Academy.

In 2020, Blige played a leading role in the horror film Body Cam. She also starred in the independent drama film Pink Skies Ahead. Blige formerly starred as Monet Stewart Tejada in Power Book II: Ghost, the first spin-off for the highly rated Starz cable drama Power which premiered in September 2020. Blige played singer Dinah Washington in the biographical drama film Respect about life and career of Aretha Franklin. The film was released theatrically on August 13, 2021. In 2023, Blige was cast in the drama film Rob Peace, a film adaptation of The Short and Tragic Life of Robert Peace, written and directed by Chiwetel Ejiofor.

== Personal life ==
In the 1990s, Blige spent six years in a relationship with singer Cedric "K-Ci" Hailey of the R&B group Jodeci. Their turbulent relationship inspired Blige's album My Life. During a 1995 interview on the UK television show The Word, Blige confirmed the two were engaged; Hailey denied that they were going to get married. Following her break-up with Hailey, Blige developed a relationship with singer Case, which dwindled due to his involvement with other women. She also briefly dated rapper Nas.

Blige married her manager, Martin "Kendu" Isaacs, on December 7, 2003. At the time, Isaacs had two children, Nas and Jordan, with his first wife, and an older daughter, Briana, from a teenage relationship. In July 2016, Blige filed for divorce, citing "irreconcilable differences". Blige and Isaacs' divorce was finalized on June 21, 2018.

Blige is a Democrat and performed for Barack Obama at the 2012 Democratic National Convention.

Blige has dealt with drug and alcohol addiction, and as of 2019, she had been sober for several years. She has no biological children, proclaiming in a February 2022 interview with E! News, "I have nieces and nephews forever, and I'm always watching how people are scrambling around for babysitters. I don't want to go through that. I like my freedom. I like being able to get up and go and move and do what I want to do."

== Other ventures ==
Blige has had endorsement contracts with Reebok, Air Jordan, Pepsi, Coca-Cola, Gap, Target, American Express, AT&T Inc., M·A·C, Apple Inc., Burger King and Chevrolet. She has also been a spokesperson for Carol's Daughter beauty products and Citibank's Citi Card program (alongside Nickelback).

In 2004, Blige launched her own record label, Matriarch Records, distributed through Interscope. In 2012, she discovered girl group Just'Us, making the group the first ladies of the label. At the time, Blige said, "These are my little Mary's; they each remind me of myself at different points in my life." Blige was reportedly working with the group on their debut album, but it never materialized, and Just'Us has since disbanded.

In 2009, Blige's production company, along with William Morris Endeavor, was working on several TV and film projects.

In July 2010, in partnership with the Home Shopping Network (HSN) and Carol's Daughter, Blige launched her first perfume, My Life (through Carol's Daughter), exclusively on HSN. The fragrance broke HSN sales records in hours, by selling 50,000 bottles during its premiere, and has been awarded two prestigious FIFI awards from the Fragrance Foundation, including the "Fragrance Sales Breakthrough" award. In August 2011, another scent called My Life Blossom was launched exclusively to HSN.

In October 2010, Blige released "Melodies by MJB", a line of sunglasses. The first Melodies collection featured four styles with a total of 20 color options. Each style represented a specific facet of Blige's life. In the spring of 2011, Essence magazine reported that "Melodies by MJB" had extended their collection to offer more styles.

In April 2012, Blige was featured in an online preview for a TV commercial made by the advertising agency Mother NY, which advertised Burger King's crispy chicken wrap, in which she sang, "Crispy chicken, fresh lettuce, three cheeses, ranch dressing, wrapped up in a tasty, flour tortilla," to the tune of her song "Don't Mind". The commercial was soon removed from YouTube by Universal Music Group based on music licensing issues. Its preview received widespread backlash on social media, blogs, and YouTube for what commenters criticized as employing racial stereotypes associating Black people with fried chicken, with MadameNoire decrying it as "buffoonery". Blige soon said that she had not "signed off" on the "unfinished spot", which, according to her, was meant to include a dream sequence, and Burger King publicly apologized to Blige for the commercial's premature release. For Slate, Aisha Harris wrote that calling the advertisement racist was a "dubious claim" and "insulting to Blige", instead criticizing its "mediocre" production value and "embarrassing" lyrics. In a June 2012 interview with Angie Martinez for Hot 97, Blige apologized for her participation in the campaign and said that she would "never just bust out singing about chicken and chicken wings". She also said that the criticism had "crushed" her and "exposed everyone and everything" in her life. The advertisement was later included on the New York Post's 2014 list of the most embarrassing commercials featuring celebrities, BBC News' 2016 list of the most memorable celebrity endorsements, and E! News' 2017 list of the most controversial commercials of all time.

In late 2020, Blige and her close friend, Simone Johnson-Smith, a cancer survivor and wife of rapper LL Cool J, co-founded Sister Love, a jewelry line for women. Blige also announced the 2019 formation of a film and television production label, Blue Butterfly Productions. On December 16, 2022, the label signed a first-look lucrative deal with BET for scripted and non-scripted content; its first under the partnership was Blige's talk show, The Wine Down with Mary J. Blige, which premiered in early 2023.

She has founded two companies: Mary Jane Productions, which she co-founded with her former manager, Steve Stoute, in 1994, and an independent record label, Beautiful Life Productions, in 2023. She signed Boyz II Men affiliate group, WanMor to the former in August 2023 and New York rapper Vado to the latter in May 2024.

== Legacy ==
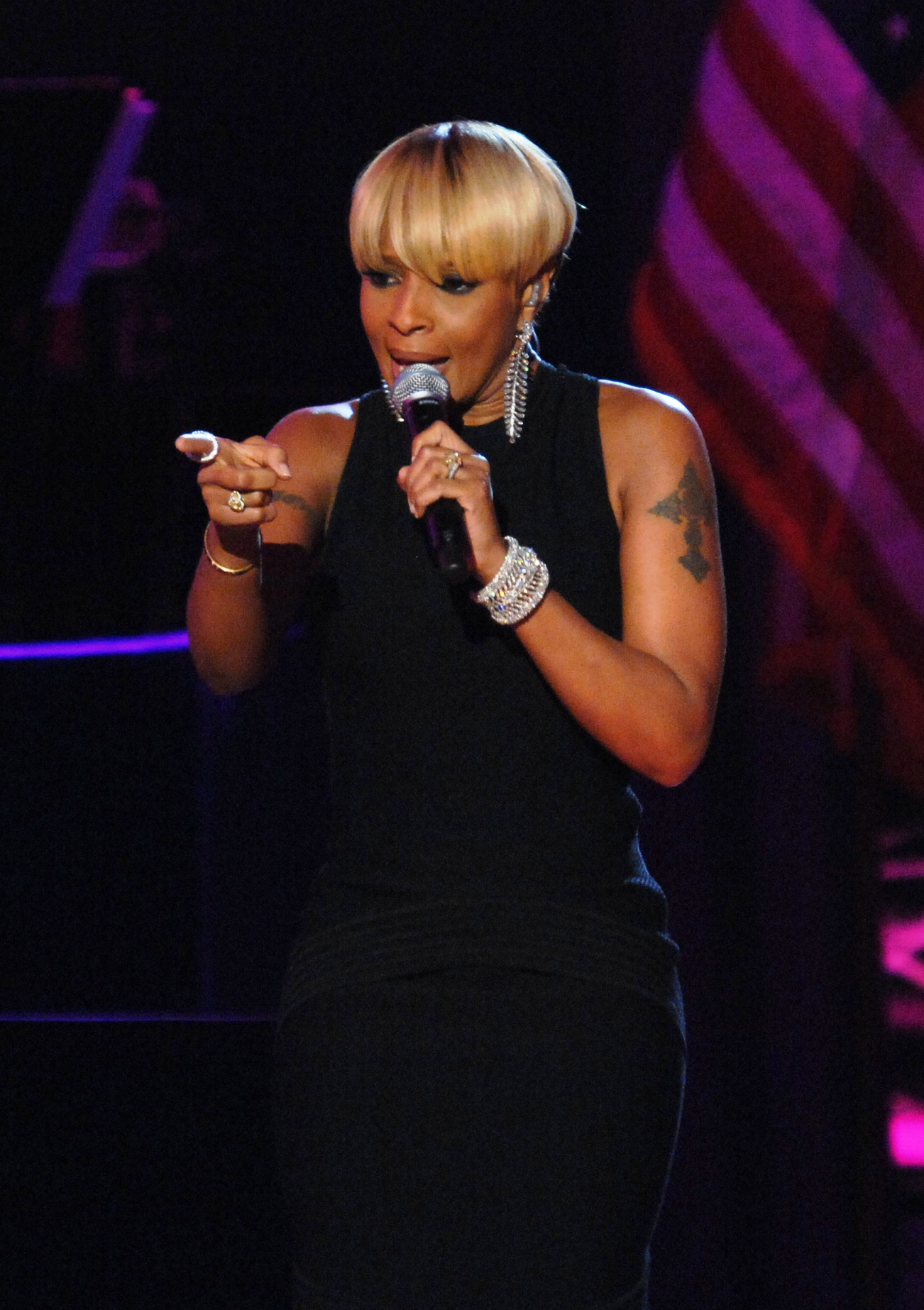
Mary J. Blige performing at the Neighborhood Ball in 2009

Called the "Queen of Hip-Hop Soul", Blige is credited with influencing the musical marriage of hip hop and R&B. Ethan Brown of The New Yorker says that albums "What's the 411?" and "My Life", in hindsight, invented "the sample-heavy sound that reinvigorated urban radio and became a blueprint for nineties hip-hop and R&B". Tom Horan of The Daily Telegraph comments that Blige, being an immensely influential figure in popular music, "invented what is now called R&B by successfully combining female vocals with muscular hip hop rhythm tracks. All over the world, that recipe dominates today's charts." Called one of the "most explosive, coming-out displays of pure singing prowess" and "one of the most important albums of the nineties", What's the 411? saw Blige pioneer "the movement that would later become neo soul, generating gripping songs that were also massive radio hits".

African American scholars have noted the implications of Blige's presentation and representation of black womanhood and femininity in the typically male-dominated and centric sphere of hip hop. Blending the vocal techniques of rapping in hip hop with aspirational messages in R&B, Blige is credited with articulating black women's experiences in a "more factual and objective" manner than typical stereotypes and tropes of black women in the media. Using her personal experiences and struggles with her family as source material for her songs, Blige refutes notions of black female hypersexuality by "imploring women to love and empower themselves through both autonomy and intimacy." This desire for love does more than connect to her audience members. With particular attention on her single "Real Love", critics note how the song is "a performative text, declaratively demand[ing] recognition of Blige's full humanity and, more broadly, that of hip-hop-generation women."

Blige and her work have influenced several recording artists, including Adele, Taylor Swift, Layton Greene, Cheryl, Teyana Taylor, Keke Palmer, Jess Glynne, Sam Smith, Summer Walker, K. Michelle, Rihanna, Keyshia Cole and Alexandra Burke.

In 2020, Kamala Harris, the first Black and South Asian female Vice President-elect on a major party, walked out to "Work That" at the 2020 Democratic National Convention, campaign events (including her own presidential campaign), and her victory speech.

== Awards and achievements ==
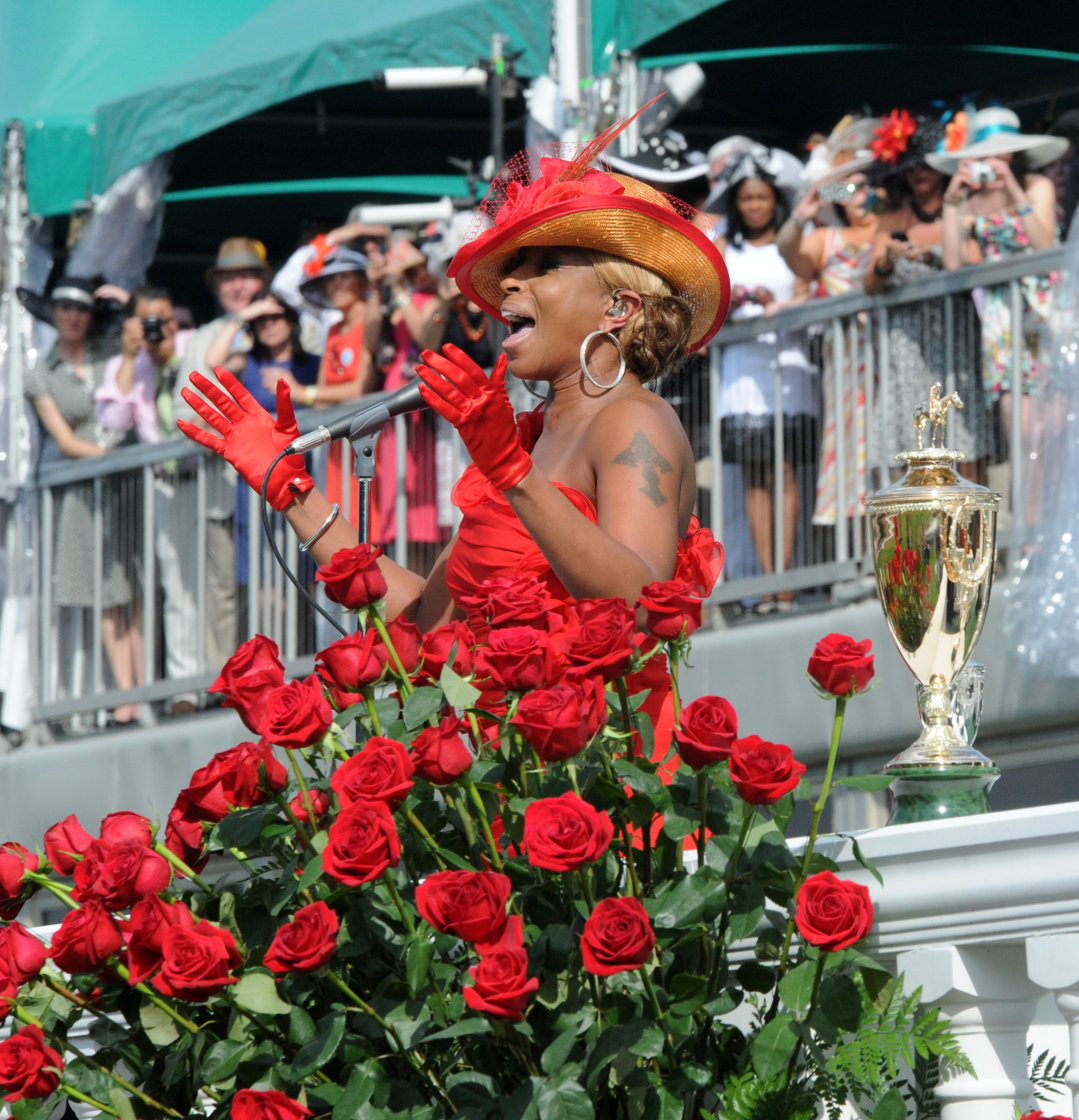
Blige performing "The Star-Spangled Banner" at the 2012 Kentucky Derby

Blige has received numerous awards, including nine Grammy Awards, a Primetime Emmy Award, six BET Awards, four American Music Awards, twelve NAACP Image Awards, six Soul Train Music Awards, twelve Billboard Music Awards and an MTV Video Music Award. She also received a star on the Hollywood Walk of Fame in 2018, the BET Lifetime Achievement Award in 2019, and the Billboard Icon Award in 2022. In 2010, she was ranked 80th on VH1's list of the 100 Greatest Artist of All Time. Blige was listed as one of the 50 most influential R&B singers by Essence. In 2003, Rolling Stone magazine ranked My Life at number 279 on its list of the 500 Greatest Albums of All Time. The album was also included on Time's list of the 100 Greatest albums of All Time. In 2020, both What's the 411? and My Life were featured in a rebooted list of the 500 Greatest Albums of All Time, at 271 and 126 respectively. Alternately called the "Queen of R&B" for her success in the realm of R&B, Blige has amassed ten number one albums on the R&B/Hip Hop Albums chart . Billboard ranked her at number 23 on its 2025 "Top 100 Women Artists of the 21st Century" list.

As an actress, Blige received the Breakthrough Performance Award at the 2018 Palm Springs International Film Festival for her role in Mudbound.

In April 2026, she was ranked on Forbes's "Self-Made 250: The Greatest Living Self-Made Americans" list for her beginnings and her journey to wealth.

== Discography ==
=== Studio albums ===
- What's the 411? (1992)
- My Life (1994)
- Share My World (1997)
- Mary (1999)
- No More Drama (2001)
- Love & Life (2003)
- The Breakthrough (2005)
- Growing Pains (2007)
- Stronger with Each Tear (2009)
- My Life II... The Journey Continues (Act 1) (2011)
- A Mary Christmas (2013)
- The London Sessions (2014)
- Strength of a Woman (2017)
- Good Morning Gorgeous (2022)
- Gratitude (2024)

== Tours ==
=== Headlining ===
- Share My World Tour (1997–98)
- The Mary Show Tour (2000)
- No More Drama Tour (2002)
- Love & Life Tour (2004)
- The Breakthrough Experience Tour (2006)
- Growing Pains European Tour (2008)
- Love Soul Tour (2008)
- Music Saved My Life Tour (2010–11)
- The London Sessions Tour (2015)
- Strength of a Woman Tour (2017)
- Good Morning Gorgeous Tour (2022)
- For My Fans Tour (2025)

=== Co-headlining ===
- Heart of the City Tour (with Jay-Z) (2007)
- The Liberation Tour (with D'Angelo) (2012–13)
- King and Queen of Hearts World Tour (with Maxwell) (2016)
- The Royalty Tour (with Nas) (2019)

=== Supporting ===
- Humpin' Around the World Tour (with Bobby Brown) (1992–1993)

== Filmography ==
Ghost Whisperer (S2E15)

- Prison Song (2001)
- I Can Do Bad All by Myself (2009)
- Chico and Rita (2010)
- Rock of Ages (2012)
- Betty and Coretta (2013)
- Black Nativity (2013)
- Champs (2014)
- The Wiz Live! (2015)
- Mudbound (2017)
- Sherlock Gnomes (2018)
- Trolls World Tour (2020)
- Body Cam (2020)
- The Violent Heart (2020)
- Pink Skies Ahead (2020)
- Respect (2021)
- Rob Peace (2024)

== See also ==
- List of artists who reached number one in the United States
- List of black Golden Globe Award winners and nominees
- Honorific nicknames in popular music
