= Good Morning Gorgeous (song) =

Single by Mary J. Blige

from the album Good Morning Gorgeous
- Released: December 3, 2021
- Length: 2:54
- Label: 300; Mary Jane
- Songwriters: Mary J. Blige; Dernst Emile II; Gabriella Wilson; David D. Brown; Tiara Thomas
- Producers: D'Mile; H.E.R.

Mary J. Blige singles chronology
"Always" (2020)	"Good Morning Gorgeous" (2021)	"Amazing" (2021)

"Good Morning Gorgeous" is a song by American singer Mary J. Blige. It was written by Blige along with Lucky Daye, Tiara Thomas, Dernst "D'Mile" Emile II, and Gabriella "H.E.R." Wilson for her same-titled fourteenth studio album (2022), while production was helmed by Emile and Wilson. A downtempo R&B song, "Good Morning Gorgeous" has Blige singing an ode to loving one's self. A remix featuring additional vocals from H.E.R. was issued in March 2022.

The song was released by 300 Entertainment as the album's lead single on December 3, 2021 along with DJ Khaled-produced "Amazing." It reached number 33 on the US Hot R&B/Hip-Hop Songs chart and became Blige's seventh chart topper on the Adult R&B Songs chart, eventually reaching Gold status in the United States. At the 65th Annual Grammy Awards, "Good Morning Gorgeous" received three nominations, including Record of the Year, Best Traditional R&B Performance and Best R&B Song.

== Critical reception ==
Eric Torres from Clash described "Good Morning Gorgeous" as a "torchy cut" and "quintessential Mary: an anthem of self-love to lift yourself out of the darkness, gilded with fingersnaps, leisurely guitar melodies, and dynamic backing vocals. The song recasts a personal low as a vulnerable, revitalizing pep talk to herself and thus everyone else." Variety critic A.D. Amorosi is the most devastating test of all: a hot-winded ambient whirr where the blues and gospel act as sand and silt. To this, an echo-affected Blige burrows deep into the dos and don’ts of the self’s rights and wrongs before coming up with a mirror’s daily affirmation, and a damn impactful plea for respect."

== Accolades ==
Awards and nominations for "Good Morning Gorgeous"
Organization	Year	Category	Result	Ref.
Grammy Awards	2023	Record of the Year	Nominated	
Grammy Awards	2023	Best Traditional R&B Performance	Nominated	
Grammy Awards	2023	Best R&B Song	Nominated	
Soul Train Music Awards	2022	Best Song of the Year	Nominated	
Soul Train Music Awards	2022	The Ashford & Simpson Songwriter's Award	Nominated	
Soul Train Music Awards	2022	Best Video of the Year	Nominated	

== Chart performance ==
"Good Morning Gorgeous" became Blige's highest-charting song in a decade. In the week of February 26, 2022, it peaked number 82 on the US Billboard Hot 100, her highest solo placing since 2009's "I Am." The same week, it also reached the top spot of Billboard's US Adult R&B Songs chart. It marked Blige's seventh number-one hit on the chart and would remain four weeks atop the chart. On January 4, 2024, the song was certified Gold by the Recording Industry Association of America (RIAA) for sales over 500,000 equivalent units. It was Blige's first RIAA certification update as a lead act since 2013's A Mary Christmas album.

== Music video ==
A music video for "Good Morning Gorgeous" was directed by Eif Rivera and produced by Omar Reynoso for Fatking Films. It premiered online on December 3, 2021.

== Credits and personnel ==
Credits adapted from the liner notes of "Good Morning Gorgeous."

- Mary J. Blige – vocals, writer
- Louis Bordeaux – additional recording
- Lucky Daye – writer
- Dernst "D'Mile" Emile II – producer, writer
- Serban Ghenea – mixing engineer
- Jaymz Hardy-Martin III – additional engineering
- Pat Kelly – recording engineer
- Ian Kimmel – assistant engineer
- Tiara Thomas – writer
- Gabriella "H.E.R." Wilson – background vocals, guitar, producer, writer

== Charts ==
=== Weekly charts ===
Weekly chart performance for "Good Morning Gorgeous"
Chart (2021–22)	Peak position
US Billboard Hot 100	83
US Hot R&B/Hip-Hop Songs (Billboard)	33

=== Year-end charts ===
Year-end chart performance for "Good Morning Gorgeous"
Chart (2022)	Position
US Adult R&B Songs (Billboard)	4

== Certifications ==
Certifications and sales for "Good Morning Gorgeous"
Region	Certification	Certified units/sales
United States (RIAA)	Gold	500,000^{‡}
^{‡} Sales+streaming figures based on certification alone.

== Release history ==
Release history and formats for "Good Morning Gorgeous"
Region	Date	Format(s)	Label	Edition(s)	Ref
Various	December 3, 2021	Digital download	300; Mary Jane	Album version	
Various	March 24, 2022	Digital download	300; Mary Jane	Remix version	
