= Heart of the City Tour =

2008 concert tour by Mary J. Blige and Jay-Z

- Tour by Mary J. Blige and Jay-Z
- Promotional poster for the tour
- Location: United States; Canada
- Associated album: Growing Pains; American Gangster
- Start date: March 22, 2008
- End date: May 10, 2008
- No. of shows: 25
Mary J. Blige tour chronology
The Breakthrough Experience Tour (2006)	Heart of the City Tour (2008)	Growing Pains European Tour (2008)
Jay-Z tour chronology
American Gangster Live (2007)	Heart of the City Tour (2008)	Jay-Z & Ciara Live (2009)

The Heart of the City Tour was a co-headlining concert tour by American singer Mary J. Blige and American rapper Jay-Z. The North America tour supports Blige's eighth studio album, Growing Pains (2007) and Jay-Z's tenth studio album American Gangster (2007). According to Pollstar.com the Heart of the City Tour grossed over $34.2 million, making it the most successful male-female hip-hop/R&B tour in history. The-Dream was the opening act for the tour, supporting his 2007 debut album Love/Hate.

== Opening act ==
- The-Dream

=== Musicians ===
- Mary J. Blige - Main Performer, Vocals
- Omar Edwards - Musical Direction
- Adam Blackstone - Musical Direction
- Devine Evans - Music Programmer
- Tiffany Bastiani - Vocals (Background)
- Carlos Battery - Vocals (Background)
- Robert "JJ" Smith - Bass
- Rexsell Hardy - Drums
- Jeff Motley - Keyboards
- Luke Austin - Keyboards
- Omar Edwards - Keyboards
- Shawn Hinton - Guitar

== Set list ==
=== Mary J. Blige ===
1. "Can't Knock the Hustle" (with Jay-Z)
2. "You're All I Need to Get By"
3. "Mary Jane (All Night Long)"
4. "Don't Go" (contains elements of "My Life")
5. "Reminisce"
6. "Real Love" (contains elements of "Outstanding")
7. "You Bring Me Joy"
8. "Everything"
9. "Sweet Thing"
10. "Love No Limit"
11. "Feel Like a Woman"
12. "Stay Down"
13. "Be Happy"
14. "Hurt Again"
15. "My Life"
16. "Fade Away"
17. "No More Drama"
18. "Not Gon' Cry"
19. "Your Child"
20. "I'm Going Down"
21. "Just Fine"
22. "Work That"
23. "Be Without You"
24. "Family Affair"

=== Jay-Z ===
1. "Say Hello"
2. "Roc Boys (And the Winner Is)..."
3. "U Don't Know"
4. "99 Problems"
5. "Is That Your Chick (The Lost Verses)"
6. "Blue Magic"
7. "Minority Report"
8. "Dirt off Your Shoulder"
9. "Excuse Me Miss"
10. "Izzo (H.O.V.A.)"
11. "Jigga What, Jigga Who"
12. "Can I Get A..."
13. "Show Me What You Got"
14. "Hard Knock Life (Ghetto Anthem)"
15. "Girls, Girls, Girls"
16. "Big Pimpin'"
17. "Can I Live..."
18. "Song Cry" (with Mary J. Blige)
19. "Public Service Announcement"
20. "I Just Wanna Love U (Give It 2 Me)"
21. "Ain't No Love in the Heart of the City" (with Mary J. Blige)

== Tour dates ==
List of concerts, showing date, city, country and venue
Date (2008)	City	Country	Venue
March 22	Miami	U.S.	American Airlines Arena
March 26	Baltimore	U.S.	1st Mariner Arena
March 27	Uniondale	U.S.	Nassau Coliseum
March 28	East Rutherford	U.S.	Izod Center
March 30	Philadelphia	U.S.	Wachovia Center
April 2	Toronto	Canada	Air Canada Centre
April 3	Boston	U.S.	TD Banknorth Garden
April 5	Greensboro	U.S.	Greensboro Coliseum
April 6	Washington, D.C.	U.S.	Verizon Center
April 8	Atlanta	U.S.	Philips Arena
April 9	New Orleans	U.S.	New Orleans Arena
April 10	Houston	U.S.	Toyota Center
April 12	Dallas	U.S.	SuperPages.com Center
April 15	Phoenix	U.S.	US Airways Center
April 16	Los Angeles	U.S.	Hollywood Bowl
April 18	Irvine	U.S.	Verizon Wireless Amphitheater
April 19	Las Vegas	U.S.	MGM Grand Garden Arena
April 20	Oakland	U.S.	Oracle Arena
April 25	Auburn Hills	U.S.	The Palace of Auburn Hills
April 26	Chicago	U.S.	United Center
April 27	Chicago	U.S.	United Center
May 1	Buffalo	U.S.	HSBC Arena
May 2	New York City	U.S.	Madison Square Garden
May 5	Atlantic City	U.S.	Boardwalk Hall
May 6	New York City	U.S.	Madison Square Garden
May 7	New York City	U.S.	Madison Square Garden
May 10	Uncasville	U.S.	Mohegan Sun Arena
