= Growing Pains European Tour =

2008 concert tour by Mary J. Blige

- Tour by Mary J. Blige
- Location: Europe; Australia
- Associated album: Growing Pains
- Start date: May 20, 2008
- End date: July 19, 2008
- No. of shows: 17

Mary J. Blige concert chronology
- Heart of the City Tour (2008); Growing Pains European Tour (2008); Love Soul Tour (2008)

The Growing Pains European Tour was the sixth concert tour in by American singer-songwriter Mary J. Blige, in support of her platinum eighth studio album, Growing Pains (2007). It began in May 2008 and continued through July 2008. In addition to visiting cities throughout Europe, Blige also performed four dates in Australia.

== Opening Act ==
- Bryn Christopher (Select dates)

=== Musicians ===
- Mary J. Blige - Main Performer, Vocals
- Omar Edwards - Musical Direction
- Adam Blackstone - Musical Direction
- Devine Evans - Music Programmer
- Tiffany Bastiani - Vocals (Background)
- Carlos Battery - Vocals (Background)
- Robert "JJ" Smith - Bass
- Rexsell Hardy - Drums
- Monete Neuble - Keyboards
- Marcus Kincy - Keyboards
- Luke Austin - Keyboards
- Omar Edwards - Keyboards
- Shawn Hinton - Guitar

== Set list ==
1. "MJB" (intro)
2. "Grown Woman"
3. "Reminisce" / "Mary Jane (All Night Long)" / "I'm The Only Woman" / "Real Love"
4. "You Bring Me Joy"
5. "Be Happy"
6. "Sweet Thing"
7. "Love No Limit"
8. "Everything"
9. "Take Me as I Am"
10. "Not Gon' Cry"
11. "I'm Goin' Down"
12. "Fade Away"
13. "No More Drama"
14. "One"
15. "MJB Da MVP"
16. "Work That"
17. "Enough Cryin"
18. "Be Without You"

Encore

19. "Just Fine"
20. "Family Affair"

== Tour dates ==
List of concerts, showing date, city, country and venue
Date (2008)	City	Country	Venue
May 18	Zürich	Switzerland	Hallenstadion (cancelled)
May 20	Munich	Germany	Zenith
May 22	Copenhagen	Denmark	Tivoli Concert Hall (cancelled)
May 24	Stockholm	Sweden	Hovet (cancelled)
May 26	Hamburg	Germany	Hamburg Stadtpark
May 28	Rotterdam	Netherlands	Rotterdam Ahoy
May 29	Berlin	Germany	Zitadelle
May 30	Düsseldorf	Germany	Philipshalle
June 1	Antwerp	Belgium	Lotto Arena
June 2	Paris	France	Zénith de Paris
June 3	London	U.K.	O2 Arena
June 5	Manchester	U.K.	Manchester Arena
June 6	Birmingham	U.K.	National Exhibition Centre
June 10	Perth	Australia	Burswood Dome
June 12	Melbourne	Australia	Rod Laver Arena
June 13	Sydney	Australia	Sydney Entertainment Centre
June 14	Boondall	Australia	Brisbane Entertainment Centre
July 16	Stockholm	Sweden	Stockholm Jazz Festival
July 17	Molde	Norway	Molde Jazz Festival
July 19	Pori	Finland	Pori Jazz Festival
