= Good Morning Gorgeous =

Studio album by Mary J. Blige
- Released: February 11, 2022
- Length: 38:07
- Labels: 300; Mary Jane
- Producers: Akeel Henry; Anderson .Paak; Ben Billions; BongoByTheWay; Cool & Dre; D'Mile; DJ Camper; DJ Cassidy; DJ Khaled; H.E.R.; Jerry Duplessis; J. White Did It; London on da Track; Roget Chahayed; Streetrunner; Swizz Beatz; Tarik Azzouz

Mary J. Blige chronology
Strength of a Woman (2017)	Good Morning Gorgeous (2022)	Gratitude (2024)

Singles from Good Morning Gorgeous
- 1. "Good Morning Gorgeous" Released: December 5, 2021; 2. "Amazing" Released: December 5, 2021; 3. "Rent Money" Released: January 21, 2022; 4. "Here with Me" Released: April 29, 2022

Good Morning Gorgeous is the fourteenth studio album by American singer Mary J. Blige, released on February 11, 2022, through 300 Entertainment and her Mary Jane Productions imprint. Her first album in nearly five years, it marked her first release for 300 Entertainment and her first album that was not released by a subsidiary of Universal Music.

The album includes collaborations with Anderson .Paak, Dave East, DJ Khaled, Fivio Foreign, and Usher. It was preceded and supported by three singles: "Good Morning Gorgeous", "Amazing" featuring DJ Khaled, "Rent Money" featuring Dave East, and "Here with Me" featuring Anderson .Paak.

The deluxe version of the album received six nominations at the 65th Grammy Awards including Album of the Year and Best R&B Album.

== Promotion ==
Blige revealed the track listing on January 21, 2022, alongside the release of "Rent Money". Two days after the album release, Blige performed during the Super Bowl LVI halftime show alongside Dr. Dre, Snoop Dogg, Eminem and Kendrick Lamar. On June 30, Blige released a music video for "Come See About Me" featuring Fabolous. On January 10, 2024, on the eve of her 53rd birthday, Blige released the video for "Gone Forever", featuring Remy Ma and DJ Khaled.

== Singles ==
Blige released the first two singles, "Good Morning Gorgeous", which peaked at number 83 on the Billboard Hot 100, and "Amazing" featuring DJ Khaled, on December 5, 2021. Its music video premiered on February 11, 2022. On January 31, 2022, she released the third single, "Rent Money" featuring Dave East. "Here with Me" featuring Anderson .Paak, was released to urban AC as the fourth single on April 29, 2022.

== Reception ==
Professional ratings
Aggregate scores
Source	Rating
Metacritic	75/100
Review scores
Source	Rating
AllMusic	4/5 stars
And It Don't Stop	A−
The Arts Desk	5/5 stars
Clash	7/10
Entertainment Weekly	B+
Pitchfork	6.5/10
Rolling Stone	3.5/5 stars

Good Morning Gorgeous was met with generally favorable reviews from music critic. On review aggregator Metacritic, the album received a score of 75 out of 100 based on 7 reviews.

Leah Greenblatt, reviewing the album for Entertainment Weekly, points out that "with her 15th studio album, the queen of hip-hop/soul dives into life as a single woman" because "if 2017's Strength of a Woman was her record about divorce rovisonos, [...] Gorgeous is the sound of an artist slowly re-emerging." Greenblatt writes that "as a songwriter, Blige's gift has never been so much specificity as sincerity, and the songs on Gorgeous deal with topics so familiar that they have worn out like the grooves on a vinyl record: hope, pain, learning to love and let go; [...] in the freedom that comes from no longer having privileged consideration in the pop market."

Clash's Robin Murray calls the singer "a phenomenon" as "her graceful touch defies time and trends, with her vivid approach pushing toward a more universal sense of connection." Murray, at the end of the review, writes that one hears "a record that exudes charm and grace." Mosi Reeves of Rolling Stone writes that "almost all of Blige's 15 albums have a conceptual structure; [...] but Good Morning Gorgeous seems looser than others" in which "the artist carefully avoids the deep melancholy of her past. The music is mostly hopeful and lively, even when the sentiments belie that."

Less enthusiastic Pitchfork's Eric Torres review, who although finds that the album "a celebratory record that mixes uplifting, soulful affirmations with exercises in contemporary rap and R&B", it has collaboration which "come across as scattered, an unfortunate side effect that hinders the album's invigorating self-empowerment; [...] The album's assorted collaborations range from solid to baffling".

=== Industry awards ===
Awards for Good Morning Gorgeous
Organization	Year	Award	Result	Ref.
BET Awards	2022	BET Her Award	Won	
Soul Train Music Awards	2022	Album of the Year	Nominated	
Grammy Awards	2023	Album of the Year	Nominated	
Grammy Awards	2023	Best R&B Album	Nominated	

== Commercial performance ==
In the United States, Good Morning Gorgeous debuted at number 14 on the US Billboard 200 chart, earning 25,000 album-equivalent units in its first week. This became Mary's first album to miss the top-ten on the chart. It also entered at number nine on the US Top R&B/Hip-Hop Albums chart, becoming Blige's 19th top-ten entry and surpassing Mariah Carey for the second most top-ten titles on the chart.

== Track listing ==
Good Morning Gorgeous track listing
No.	Title	Writer(s)	Producer(s)	Length
1.	"No Idea"	Mary J. Blige; Anderson .Paak; Uforo "Bongo" Ebong; Eric Hudson; Adriana Flores; Bryan Ponce	BongoByTheWay	2:16
2.	"Love Will Never"	Blige; Jocelyn "Jozzy" Donald; Ebong; Hudson; Phil Lewis	DJ Camper	3:29
3.	"Here with Me" (featuring Anderson .Paak)	Blige; Paak; Ant Clemons; Ebong	Bongo ByTheWay	2:19
4.	"Rent Money" (featuring Dave East)	Blige; Shawn Butler; D'Mile; East; Sean Combs; R. Kelly; Christopher Wallace; Daron Jones	D'Mile; Akeel Henry	3:49
5.	"Amazing" (featuring DJ Khaled)	Blige; Denisia Andrews; Brittany Coney; Khaled; Street Runner; Tarik Azzouz; Willie Cobbs; Ellas McDaniel	Khaled; Street Runner; Azzouz	2:39
6.	"GMG (Interlude)"			1:11
7.	"Good Morning Gorgeous"	Blige; D'Mile; H.E.R.; David D. Brown; Tiara Thomas	D'Mile; H.E.R.	2:54
8.	"Come See About Me"	Blige; Donald; Clemons; Marcelloe Valenzano; Andre Christopher Lyon; Leon Michels	Cool & Dre	3:28
9.	"On Top" (featuring Fivio Foreign)	Blige; Donald; Valenzano; Lyon; Shawn Hibbler; Jamie Hurton; Thomas Bell; Alexander Hart	Cool & Dre	2:47
10.	"Love Without the Heartbreak"	Blige; Paak; Rogėt Chahayed; Alissia Benveniste	Paak; Rogėt	3:48
11.	"Failing in Love"	Blige; Donald; London on da Track; Slim Wav; Archer	London on da Track	3:18
12.	"Enough"	Blige; Bianca Atterberry; Valenzano; Lyon; Peter Skellern	Cool & Dre	3:05
13.	"Need Love" (featuring Usher)	Blige; Charles A. Hinshaw; Anthony Jermaine White; Kim Owens	J. White Did It	3:04
Total length:				38:07

US Target bonus track
No.	Title	Writer(s)	Producer(s)	Length
14.	"Running" (featuring Ne-Yo)	Blige; Shaffer Smith; Kasseem Dean; Arden Altino	Swizz Beatz; Jerry Wonda	4:20
Total length:				42:27

Deluxe edition
No.	Title	Writer(s)	Producer(s)	Length
1.	"No Idea"	Blige; Paak; Ebong; Hudson; Flores; Ponce	Bongo ByTheWay	2:16
2.	"Love Will Never"	Blige; Donald; Ebong; Hudson; Lewis	DJ Camper	3:29
3.	"Here with Me" (featuring Anderson .Paak)	Blige; Paak; Clemons; Ebong	Bongo ByTheWay	2:19
4.	"Rent Money" (featuring Dave East)	Blige; Butler; D'Mile; East; Combs; Kelly; Wallace; Jones	D'Mile; Akeel Henry	3:49
5.	"Gone Forever" (featuring Remy Ma and DJ Khaled)	Blige; Benjamin Diehl; Coney; Andrews; Khaled; Giorgio Moroder; Nicholas Warwar; Raney Shockne; Reminisce Mackie; Tarik Azzouz	Khaled; Ben Billions; Street Runner; Azzouz	3:02
6.	"Amazing" (featuring DJ Khaled)	Blige; Andrews; Coney; Khaled; Street Runner; Azzouz; Cobbs; McDaniels	Khaled; Street Runner	2:39
7.	"GMG (Interlude)"			1:11
8.	"Good Morning Gorgeous"	Blige; D'Mile; H.E.R.; Brown; Thomas	D'Mile; H.E.R.	2:54
9.	"Come See About Me"	Blige; Donald; Clemons; Valenzano; Lyon; Michels	Cool & Dre	3:28
10.	"On Top" (featuring Fivio Foreign)	Blige; Donald; Valenzano; Lyon; Hibbler; Hurton; Bell; Hart	Cool & Dre	2:47
11.	"Tough Love" (featuring Moneybagg Yo)	Blige; Charles A. Hinshaw; Cynthia De Mari Biggs; D'Mile; Dexter Wansel; DJ Cassidy	D'Mile; DJ Cassidy	4:33
12.	"Love Without the Heartbreak"	Blige; Paak; Chahayed; Benveniste	Paak; Chahayed	3:48
13.	"Failing in Love"	Blige; Donald; London on da Track; Wav; Archer	London on da Track	3:18
14.	"Enough"	Blige; Atterberry; Valenzano; Lyon; Skellern	Cool & Dre	3:05
15.	"Need Love" (featuring Usher)	Blige; Hinshaw; White; Owens	J. White Did It	3:04
16.	"Running" (featuring Ne-Yo)	Blige; Smith; Dean; Altino	Swizz Beatz; Wonda	4:20
17.	"Good Morning Gorgeous" (featuring H.E.R.)	Blige; D'Mile; H.E.R.; Brown; Thomas	D'Mile; H.E.R.	2:54
18.	"Rent Money" (featuring Jadakiss and Griselda)	Blige; Alvin Worthy; Demond Price; Jason Phillips; Jermaine Pennick; Butler; D'Mile; East; Combs; Kelly; Wallace; Jones	D'Mile	4:10
19.	"Come See About Me" (featuring Fabolous)	Blige; Donald; Clemons; Valenzano; Lyon; Michels; John Jackson	Cool & Dre; M.Bronx	4:24
Total length:				61:40

== Charts ==
Chart performance for Good Morning Gorgeous
Chart (2022)	Peak position
Swiss Albums (Schweizer Hitparade)	56
UK Album Downloads (Official Charts)	24
UK Independent Albums (Official Charts)	24
UK R&B Albums (Official Charts)	8
US Billboard 200	14
US Top R&B/Hip-Hop Albums (Billboard)	9
