= The Clutch production discography =

This article is a list of released and unreleased music recordings resulting from the collaborations of members of The Clutch, a collective of songwriters.

== 2005 ==
| Artist | Title | The Clutch Credits | Album | Label |
|---|---|---|---|---|
| Usher | "Red Light" | Writing (Keri Hilson, J. Que Smith) | Confessions (Special Edition) | La Face |
| Usher | "Red Light" (featuring Ludacris) | Writing (Keri Hilson, J. Que Smith) | Confessions (Special Edition) | La Face |
| Shawn Desman | "Red Hair" | Writing (Keri Hilson, J. Que Smith) | Back For More | ZYX Music |
| Toni Braxton | "Sposed To Be" | Writing (Keri Hilson, J. Que Smith), Background vocals (Keri Hilson) | Libra | Blackground |
| Toni Braxton | "Almost There" (non-album track) | Writing (Keri Hilson, J. Que) | Libra | Blackground |
| Keri Hilson | "Hands, Feet" | Writing (Keri Hilson, J. Que) | In The Mix OST | J Records |
| Chris Brown | "Young Love" | Writing (Keri Hilson, J. Que) | Chris Brown | Jive Records |
| Mary J. Blige | "Take Me As I Am" | Writing (Candice Nelson, Keri Hilson, Ezekiel Lewis) | The Breakthrough | Geffen Records |
| Olivia | So Sexy | Writing (Keri Hilson, J Que, Tab Nkhereanye, Walter Millsap) | Behind Closed Doors [Sampler] | Interscope Records |

== 2006 ==
| Artist | Title | Credits | Album | Label |
|---|---|---|---|---|
| LeToya | "What Love Can Do" | Writing (Keri Hilson, J. Que Smith, The Cornaboyz); Background vocals (Keri Hilson) | LeToya | Capitol |
| Avant | "4 Minutes" | Writing (Keri Hilson, J. Que Smith, Ron Fair, The Underdogs, Antonio Dixon) | The Director | Geffen |
| Omarion | "Ice Box" | Writing (Keri Hilson, J. Que Smith, Ezekiel Lewis, Timbaland, The Royal Court); Additional vocals (J. Que Smith, Ezekiel Lewis) | 21 | Epic |
| Omarion | "Ice Box (The Clutch Re-mix featuring Usher)" | Writing (Keri Hilson, J. Que Smith, Ezekiel Lewis, Timbaland, The Royal Court); Additional vocals (J. Que Smith, Ezekiel Lewis) | 21 | Epic |
| Kat DeLuna | "Cut Off Time" (featuring Omarion) | Writing (Keri Hilson, J. Que Smith, Ezekiel Lewis, Timbaland, The Royal Court); Additional vocals (Ezekiel Lewis) | Feel The Noise OST | Epic |
| Jagged Edge | "Stunnas" (featuring JD) | Writing (Candice Nelson, Balewa Muhammad, Ezekiel Lewis, J. Que Smith, Jermaine Dupri) | The Hits | Columbia |
| Keshia Chanté | "Summer Love" | Writing (Balewa Muhammad, J. Que, Frankie Storm, Cynthia Lisette, The Co-Stars) | 2U | Epic |
| Keshia Chanté | "Stomp" | Writing & Production (Balewa Muhammad, J. Que, Arama Brown, The Co-Stars) | 2U | Epic |
| Keshia Chanté | "Too Much" | Writing (Candice Nelson, Keri Hilson, Ezekiel Lewis, J. Que, Danja); Background vocals (Keri Hilson) | 2U | Epic |
| Keshia Chanté | "Cool On You" | Writing (Candice Nelson, Balewa Muhammad, Ezekiel Lewis, Tab Nkhereanye, Derek Bramble, Happy Perez) | 2U | Epic |
| Fantasia | "I Nominate U" | Writing (Candice Nelson, Balewa Muhammad, Ezekiel Lewis, J. Que Smith, Dre & Vidal) | Fantasia | J Records |
| Fantasia | "Baby Makin' Hips" | Writing (Candice Nelson, Ezekiel Lewis, J Que Smith, Dre & Vidal, Dirty Harry, Don Cheegro) | Fantasia | J Records |
| Fantasia | "Only One U" | Writing (Candice Nelson, Balewa Muhammad, Ezekiel Lewis, Tab Nkhereanye, Bryan Michael Cox) | Fantasia | J Records |
| Fantasia | "Uneligible" | Writing (Candice Nelson, Balewa Muhammad, Danja) | Fantasia | J Records |
| Fantasia | "Bore Me (Yawn)" | Writing (Candice Nelson, Balewa Muhammad, Jim Beanz, Danja) | Fantasia | J Records |
| Fantasia | "Only One U" | Writing (Candice Nelson, Balewa Muhammad, Ezekiel Lewis, J. Que, Tab Nkhereanye, Bryan Michael Cox) | Fantasia | J Records |
| Fantasia | "Too Many Pictures" (non-album track) | Writing (Candice Nelson, Balewa Muhammad, Ezekiel Lewis, J. Que, Eric Hudson) | Fantasia | J Records |

== 2007 ==
=== Kelly Rowland – Ms. Kelly – Columbia ===
00. Some Type Of Way" (non-album track) (Candice Nelson, Balewa Muhammad, Danja)

00. "Last Time" (non-album track) (Candice Nelson, Keri Hilson, J. Que, Ezekiel Lewis, Danja) (+ Demos By Candice Nelson / Keri Hilson)

00. "Watcha Do" (non-album track) (J. Que, Ezekiel Lewis)

00. What It Do" (non-album track) (J. Que, Ezekiel Lewis)

00. "Better" (non-album track) (J. Que, Keri Hilson, Soulshock & Karlin)

=== Amerie – Because I Love It – Columbia ===
02. "Hate2LoveU" (Mi Marie, Candice Nelson, Balewa Muhammad, Ezekiel Lewis, J. Que)

- Produced by One Up Entertainment (Loren Hill, Rich Shelton & Kevin Veney), co-produced by Amerie & Len Nicholson

=== Bobby Valentino – Special Occasion (Circuit City Edition) – Def Jam / DTP ===
02. "Anonymous" (featuring Timbaland) (Mosley, Logan, Harmon, Candice Nelson, Balewa Muhammad, Ezekiel Lewis, J. Que)

- Additional vocals by Candice Nelson

05. "Rearview (Ridin')" (featuring Ludacris) (Mosley, Logan, Harmon, Candice Nelson, Balewa Muhammad, Ezekiel Lewis, J. Que, Bridges)

- Both Produced by Timbaland, co-produced by The Royal Court (King Logan & Jerome Harmon)

17. "Let's Go" (Richard, Candice Nelson, Keri Hilson, Balewa Muhammad, Ezekiel Lewis, J. Que, Morrow, Wilson)

- Produced by Don Vito & The Clutch, co-produced by Mitrxxx The Mad Scientist

00. "Pull It Off" (non-album track) (Mosley, Logan, Harmon, Candice Nelson, Balewa Muhammad, Ezekiel Lewis, J. Que)

- Produced by Timbaland, co-produced by The Royal Court (King Logan & Jerome Harmon)

=== Jennifer Lopez – Brave – Epic ===
02. "Forever" (Hollis, Candice Nelson, Balewa Muhammad, Ezekiel Lewis, J. Que)

- Produced by Hit-Boy & The Clutch
- Background vocals by Candice Nelson
- Additional vocals by Ezekiel Lewis

11. "Wrong When You're Gone" (Baker, Candice Nelson, Keri Hilson, Balewa Muhammad, Ezekiel Lewis, J. Que) (+ Demo by Keri Hilson)

- Produced by Bigg D & The Clutch
- Background vocals by Keri Hilson

12. "Brave" (Karlsson, Winnberg, Candice Nelson, Balewa Muhammad, Ezekiel Lewis, J. Que) (+ Demo by Candice Nelson)

- Produced by Bloodshy & Avant & The Clutch
- Background vocals by Candice Nelson

=== Ciara – Ciara: The Evolution – Jive / LaFace ===
01. "That's Right" (Harris, Smith, Candice Nelson, Balewa Muhammad, Cameron, Jefferson)

- Produced by Lil Jon

02. "Like a Boy" (Harris, Kenon, Candice Nelson, Balewa Muhammad, Ezekiel Lewis, J. Que)

- Produced by Calvo Da Gr8, co-produced by The Clutch & Ciara

08. "My Love" (Harris, Kennedy, Collins, Candice Nelson, Balewa Muhammad)

- Produced by Brian Kennedy, co-produced by Antwoine "T-Wizz" Collins & Ciara
- Background vocals by Candice Nelson

16. "So Hard" (Harris, Cox, Dean, Candice Nelson, Balewa Muhammad, Clark)

- Produced by Bryan-Michael Cox, co-produced by Kendrick "WyldCard" Dean
- Background vocals by Candice Nelson

=== Keke Palmer – So Uncool – Atlantic ===
02. "Joystick (The Game Song)" (Edwards, Jr., Candice Nelson, Keri Hilson, Balewa Muhammad, Ezekiel Lewis, J. Que)

03. "Music Box" (Edwards, Jr., Candice Nelson, Balewa Muhammad, Ezekiel Lewis, J. Que)

- Both Produced by Bernard "Focus..." Edwards, Jr.

00. "Too Many Pictures" (non-album track) (Hudson, Candice Nelson, Balewa Muhammad, Ezekiel Lewis, J. Que)

- Produced by Eric Hudson

00. "Dress Code" (non-album track) (Rotem, Candice Nelson, Balewa Muhammad, Ezekiel Lewis, J. Que)

- Produced by J.R. Rotem

=== Katharine McPhee – Katharine McPhee – RCA ===
03. "Open Toes" (McPhee, Hills, Candice Nelson, Balewa Muhammad, DioGuardi)

00. "Neglected" (Original Version) (McPhee, Hills, Balewa Muhammad, Candice Nelson)

- Album Version replaces Candice Nelson section with one written by Kara DioGuardi.

00. "Vegas" (non-album track) (Hills, Candice Nelson, Keri Hilson, Balewa Muhammad)

00. "Don't Tell Me" (non-album track) (McPhee, Hills, Candice Nelson, Balewa Muhammad)

- All Produced by Danja Handz

=== Timbaland – Timbaland Presents Shock Value – Interscope / MMG / Blackground ===
04. "The Way I Are" (featuring Keri Hilson & D.O.E.) (Mosley, Hills, Keri Hilson, Maultsby, Candice Nelson, Balewa Muhammad) (+ Radio Version featuring Sebastian)

- Writers: Candice Nelson – Timbaland verses, Keri Hilson – all performed sections, Balewa Muhammad – Timbaland chorus sections
- Produced by Timbaland, co-produced by Danja Handz

00. "Your Cover's Blown" (featuring Keri Hilson) (non-album track) (Mosley, Keri Hilson, Candice Nelson)

- Produced by Timbaland

00. Other TBD non-album tracks

=== Kevin Michael – Kevin Michael – Atlantic / Downtown ===
06. "Hood Buzzin'" (Karlsson, Winnberg, Wallbert, Candice Nelson, Balewa Muhammad, Ezekiel Lewis, J. Que)

- Produced by Bloodshy & The Clutch

09. "Ghost" (S. Taylor, Candice Nelson, Balewa Muhammad, Ezekiel Lewis, J. Que)

- Produced by Shea Taylor & The Clutch
- Background vocals by Candice Nelson

11. "Weekend Jumpoff" (Rotem, Candice Nelson, Balewa Muhammad, Ezekiel Lewis, J. Que)

- Produced by J.R. Rotem & The Clutch

00. "Better Late" (non-album track) (J. Que, Ezekiel Lewis)

=== Mario – Go! – J ===
07. "No Definition" (Mosley, Logan, Harmon, Candice Nelson, Balewa Muhammad, Ezekiel Lewis, J. Que)

- Produced by Timbaland & The Royal Court (King Logan & Jerome Harmon)
- Additional vocals by Ezekiel Lewis

=== Britney Spears – Blackout – Jive ===
03. "Radar" (Karlsson, Winnberg, Jonback, Candice Nelson, Balewa Muhammad, Ezekiel Lewis, J. Que)

- Background vocals by Candice Nelson

07. "Freakshow" (Spears, Karlsson, Winnberg, Jonback, Ezekiel Lewis, J. Que)

- Background vocals by Candice Nelson & Ezekiel Lewis
- Both Produced by Bloodshy & Avant & co-produced by The Clutch

=== Mary J. Blige – Growing Pains – Geffen ===
00. "Sky Cap" (non-album track)

- Produced by Timbaland

=== Trey Songz – Trey Day – Atlantic ===
10. "Store Run" (Neverson, Harris, Davis, Candice Nelson, Balewa Muhammad, Ezekiel Lewis, J. Que)

- Produced by Dre & Vidal
- Background vocals by Candice Nelson

00. "Gon' Go Down" (non-album track) (J. Que, Ezekiel Lewis)

00. "Stayed Down" (non-album track) (J. Que, Ezekiel Lewis)

=== Menudo – More Than Words – EP – Epic ===
01. "More Than Words (A E I O U)" (Hills, Candice Nelson, Balewa Muhammad, Ezekiel Lewis, J. Que, Araica)

02. "Mas Que Amor" (A E I O U)"

- Both Produced by Danja Handz & The Clutch

04. "This Christmas" (Hathaway, McKinnor)

- Produced by The Clutch and Cardiff Giants

=== Miscellaneous ===
00. "Off" (S. Taylor, Candice Nelson, Balewa Muhammad, Ezekiel Lewis, J. Que)

- Demo track Performed by Candice Nelson
- Produced by Shea Taylor

00. "Ringtone"

- Demo track Performed by Candice Nelson

== 2008 ==
=== Miscellaneous ===
00. "Radar" (Karlsson, Winnberg, Jonback, Candice Nelson, Balewa Muhammad, Ezekiel Lewis, J. Que)

- Demo track Performed by Candice Nelson
- Produced by Bloodshy & Avant
- Placed On Britney Spears' album "Blackout".

00. "Show Me What U Got"

- Demo track Performed by J. Que

00. "100" (Hollis, Woodard, Balewa Muhammad, J. Que, Ezekiel Lewis)

- Demo track Performed by Balewa Muhammad
- Produced by Hit-Boy & Chase N. Cash
- Background vocals by J. Que

00. "Hurt Somebody"

- Demo track Performed by Balewa Muhammad
- Produced by Danja Handz

00. "Taking It Well"

- Demo track Performed by Balewa Muhammad

=== Danity Kane – Welcome To The Dollhouse – Bad Boy ===
04. "Pretty Boy" (Hills, Candice Nelson, Balewa Muhammad, Ezekiel Lewis, J. Que)

- Produced by Danja Handz

06. "Sucka For Love" (Cox, Dean, Candice Nelson, Balewa Muhammad, Ezekiel Lewis, J. Que)

- Produced by Bryan Michael Cox, co-produced by Kendrick "WyldCard" Dean & The Clutch

00. "Magnet" (non-album track) (Jabr, Candice Nelson, Balewa Muhammad, Ezekiel Lewis, J. Que)

00. "Representative" (non-album track) (+ Demo by Candice Nelson)

- Both Produced by Bill Jabr

=== Tiffany Evans – Tiffany Evans – Columbia ===
01. "Promise Ring" (featuring Ciara) (Crooms, Candice Nelson, Balewa Muhammad, Ezekiel Lewis, J. Que, Reid)

- Produced by Mr. Collipark, The Clutch & Brian "B-Nasty" Reid

07. "Girl Gone Wild" (Kidd, Candice Nelson, Balewa Muhammad, Ezekiel Lewis, J. Que)

- Produced by Brian Kidd & The Clutch
- Background vocals by Candice Nelson
- Additional vocals by Balewa Muhammad & J. Que

08. "About a Boy" (Hudson, Candice Nelson, Balewa Muhammad, Ezekiel Lewis, J. Que)

- Produced by Eric Hudson
- Background vocals by Candice Nelson
- Additional vocals by Balewa Muhammad & Ezekiel Lewis

00. "Lay Back & Chill" (Original Version) (Hollis, Woodard, Cameron, Latif-Williams, Candice Nelson, Ezekiel Lewis)

- Produced by Hit-Boy & Chase 'N' Cashe
- Album Version removes Candice Nelson & Ezekiel Lewis-written sections, includes additional production from Brandon "B. Carr" Carrier and keyboards by Lamar Edwards.

00. "Whatchutalkinbout" (non-album track) (S. Taylor, Candice Nelson, Balewa Muhammad, Ezekiel Lewis, J. Que)

- Produced by Shea Taylor

=== Spensha Baker – Out Loud! – Interscope ===
09. "Hold On" (Baker, Candice Nelson, Keri Hilson, Ezekiel Lewis, J. Que)

- Produced by Bigg D

=== Raven-Symoné – Raven-Symoné – Hollywood ===
10. "Keep a Friend" (Suecof, Camper, Candice Nelson, Balewa Muhammad, Ezekiel Lewis, J. Que)

- Produced by Full Scale & The Clutch

13. "Double Dutch Bus" (Smith, Bloom)

- Produced by The Clutch, Additional Production by Bill Jabr

13. "Next" (non-album track) (Hudson, Candice Nelson, Balewa Muhammad, Ezekiel Lewis, J. Que)

- Produced by Eric Hudson

00. "Go To Girl" (non-album track) (Tates, Candice Nelson, Balewa Muhammad, Ezekiel Lewis, J. Que)

- Produced by Kevin Tates

=== Jesse McCartney – Departure (Japanese Edition) – Hollywood ===
02. "It's Over" (Kennedy, Candice Nelson, Balewa Muhammad, Ezekiel Lewis, J. Que)

10. "Runnin" (Kennedy, Candice Nelson, Balewa Muhammad, Ezekiel Lewis, J. Que)

- Both Produced by Brian Kennedy & The Clutch

13. "Bleeding Love" (McCartney, Tedder)

- Produced by The Clutch, co-produced by Bill Jabr

=== Usher – Here I Stand – LaFace ===
13. "Appetite" (Raymond, Hills, Balewa Muhammad, Ezekiel Lewis, Araica)

- Produced by Danja Handz

00. "What Happens Here Stays Here" (non-album track) (Mosley, Logan, Harmon, The Clutch – TBD members)

- Produced by Timbaland & The Royal Court – King Logan & Jerome Harmon
- Additional vocals by Ezekiel Lewis

00. "Traffic" (non-album track) (Just Blaze), "Balewa Muhammad", Ezekiel Lewis)

- Produced by Just Blaze

00. "Dirt" (non-album track) (J. Que, Ezekiel Lewis)

00. "Red Cup Affair" (non-album track) (Balewa Muhammad,Ezekiel Lewis)

=== Noel Gourdin – After My Time – Epic ===
07. "Reach" (Kadis & Sean, Eziekiel Lewis, Balewa Muhammad, Candice Nelson, J. Que, T.O.)

- Produced by Kadis & Sean

11. "Summertime" (Harris, Davis, Balewa Muhammad, Ezekiel Lewis, "Tab" Nkhereanye, Adams)

- Produced by Dre & Vidal

=== Karina Pasian – First Love – Def Jam ===
00. "Official Girl" (non-album track) (Hills, Candice Nelson, Balewa Muhammad, Ezekiel Lewis)

- Produced by Danja Handz
- Additional vocals by Ezekiel Lewis & Candice Nelson
- Placed On Cassie's second album, title TBD.

=== Donnie Klang – Just A Rolling Stone – Bad Boy ===
08. "Catch My Breath" (Hills, Candice Nelson, Balewa Muhammad, Ezekiel Lewis, J. Que)

- Produced by Danja Handz
- Vocal Production by Balewa Muhammad & Mary Brown
- Additional Vocal Production by Daniel "Skid" Mitchell

00. "Defensive" (non-album track) (Winans, Candice Nelson, Balewa Muhammad, Ezekiel Lewis, J. Que) (+ Demo by Balewa Muhammad)

- Produced by Mario Winans

=== The Pussycat Dolls – Doll Domination – Interscope ===
09. "Magic"(Mosley, Harmon, Candice Nelson, Balewa Muhammad, J. Que, Ezekiel Lewis)

10. "Halo" (Mosley, Harmon, Candice Nelson, Balewa Muhammad, J. Que, Ezekiel Lewis)

11. "In Person" (Mosley, Harmon, Candice Nelson, Balewa Muhammad, J. Que, Ezekiel Lewis)

15. "Whatchamacallit" (Mosley, Harmon, Candice Nelson, Balewa Muhammad, J. Que, Ezekiel Lewis)

- All Produced by Timbaland & Jerome "J-Roc" Harmon
- Additional vocals by Candice Nelson

00. "Zoo" (non-album track) (Mosley, Harmon, Candice Nelson, Balewa Muhammad, J. Que, Ezekiel Lewis)

- Produced by Timbaland & Jerome "J-Roc" Harmon
- Additional vocals by Candice Nelson

=== Jennifer Hudson – Jennifer Hudson – J ===
00. "Depreciate" (non-album track) (J. Que, Ezekiel Lewis)

=== Britney Spears – Circus – Jive ===
13. "Radar" (Karlsson, Winnberg, Jonback, Candice Nelson, Balewa Muhammad, Ezekiel Lewis, J. Que)

- Background vocals by Candice Nelson

15. "Phonography" (European Bonus Track) (Karlsson, Winnberg, Jonback, Candice Nelson, Balewa Muhammad, Ezekiel Lewis, J. Que)

- Background vocals by Candice Nelson, Additional vocals by Ezekiel Lewis

17. "Trouble" (iTunes Bonus Track) (Karlsson, Winnberg, Jonback, Candice Nelson, Balewa Muhammad, Ezekiel Lewis, J. Que)

- Background vocals by Candice Nelson
- All Produced by Bloodshy & Avant

00. "Abroad" (non-album track) (Hills, Araica, Candice Nelson, Balewa Muhammad, Ezekiel Lewis, J. Que)

00. "Take The Bait" (non-album track) (Hills, Araica, Candice Nelson, Balewa Muhammad, Ezekiel Lewis, J. Que)

- Both Produced by Danja Handz

=== Sterling Simms – Yours, Mine & The Truth – Def Jam ===
00. "By the Hand" (non-album track)

- Produced by Warren "Oak" Felder

=== Brutha – Brutha – Def Jam / Good Fellas ===
00. "Anymore" (non-album track)

00. "Gimme Back" (non-album track)

=== Lloyd – Lesson In Love – The Inc. Records/ Young Golden Music ===
11. Im With It (James Lackey, Ryon Lovette, Keri Hilson)

== 2009 ==
=== Miscellaneous ===
00. "Shoulda Thought About It" (Harris, Davis, Balewa Muhammad, Ezekiel Lewis, Nkhereanye)

- Demo track Performed by Candice Nelson
- Produced by Dre & Vidal

00. "Choke"

- Demo track Performed by Balewa Muhammad

00. "Over Here"

- Demo track Performed by Balewa Muhammad

=== Chris Cornell – Scream – Interscope / MMG ===
01. "Part Of Me" (Cornell, Mosley, Ezekiel Lewis, Balewa Muhammad)

02. "Time" (Cornell, Mosley, Ezekiel Lewis, Balewa Muhammad, Washington)

06. "Never Far Away" (Cornell, Mosley, Ezekiel Lewis, Balewa Muhammad, Washington)

08. "Long Gone" (Cornell, Mosley, Ezekiel Lewis, J. Que, Balewa Muhammad)

10. "Enemy" (Cornell, Mosley, Ezekiel Lewis, Balewa Muhammad, Tedder)

00. "Love Comes Down" (non-album track) (Cornell, Mosley, Ezekiel Lewis, Balewa Muhammad)

- All Produced by Timbaland

04. "Get Up" (Cornell, Mosley, Harmon, Ezekiel Lewis, Balewa Muhammad, James Fauntleroy)

00. "Do Me Wrong" (non-album track) (Cornell, Mosley, Harmon, J. Que, Ezekiel Lewis, Balewa Muhammad, James Fauntleroy, Ryan Tedder)

00. "Long Gone" (alternate version) (Cornell, Mosley, Harmon, Ezekiel Lewis, J. Que, Balewa Muhammad)

- Produced by Timbaland & Jerome "J-Roc" Harmon

=== Keri Hilson – In a Perfect World… – Interscope / MMG / Zone 4 ===
04. "Return The Favor" (featuring Timbaland) (Mosley, Keri Hilson, Candice Nelson, Balewa Muhammad, Ezekiel Lewis, J. Que)

00. "Mic Check" (featuring Akon) (non-album track) (Mosley, Keri Hilson, Candice Nelson, Balewa Muhammad, Ezekiel Lewis, J. Que)

- Produced by Timbaland
- Other TBA titles

=== Ciara – Fantasy Ride – LaFace / Jive ===
04. "Turntables" (featuring Chris Brown) (Marcella Araica, C. Brown, C. Harris, N. Washington, Candice Nelson, Jim Beanz)

- Produced by Danja

14. "Echo" (Candice Nelson, Patrick Smith, Ezekiel Lewis, Balewa Muhammad, C. Harris)

- Produced by Danja

=== Esmée Denters – Outta Here – Tennman ===
- TBD Track Names

=== Ginuwine – A Man's Thoughts – Warner Bros. Records ===
08. "Get Involved" (featuring Timbaland, Missy Elliott) (Lumpkin, Mosley, Harmon, J. Que, Ezekiel Lewis)

- Produced by Timbaland & Jerome "J-Roc" Harmon
- 00. Hate To Love Ya (non-album track)
- Produced by Timbaland

=== Justin Bieber – My World – Island Records ===
05. "One Less Lonely Girl" (Usher Raymond, Sean Hamilton Ezekiel Lewis, Balewa Muhammad)

- Produced by Ezekiel Lewis, Balewa Muhammad, and Sean Hamilton

=== Toni Braxton – 'Pulse – Atlantic ===
00. "If I Was Sane" (non-album track)

- Produced by Midi Mafia

== Unreleased Projects ==
=== Teairra Marí – At That Point [Shelved] – Warner Bros. (expected release: TBA) ===
00. "Sponsor" (LRoc, Balewa Muhammad, Ezekiel Lewis, Hadiya Nelson)

- Produced by Ezekiel Lewis, Balewa Muhammad & LRoc

=== Cassie – LP2 [Shelved] – Bad Boy (expected release: TBA) ===
00. "Official Girl" (Hills, Candice Nelson, Balewa Muhammad, Ezekiel Lewis) (+ Single Version featuring Lil Wayne)

- Produced by Danja Handz
- Additional vocals by Ezekiel Lewis & Candice Nelson

=== Teyana Taylor – From a Planet Called Harlem [Shelved] – Star Trak (expected release: TBA) ===
00. "Translation" (Hollis, Candice Nelson, Balewa Muhammad, Ezekiel Lewis, J. Que)

00. "Hey Young Girl" (Hollis, Candice Nelson, Ezekiel Lewis, J. Que, Jeffers) (featuring Eve)

00. "Color Me Pink" (Hollis, Candice Nelson, J. Que, Ezekiel Lewis)

00. "Complicated" (Hollis, Candice Nelson, J. Que)

- All Produced by Hit-Boy

00. "Nah Mean" (Crawford, Candice Nelson, Balewa Muhammad, Ezekiel Lewis, J. Que)

- Produced by Shondrae "Bangladesh" Crawford

=== 3LW – Point of No Return (shelved album) – So So Def ===
00. "Things You Never Hear" (Coleman, Keri Hilson, J. Que)

- Produced by Melvin "St. Nick" Coleman
- Background vocals by Keri Hilson

=== Menudo – shelved album – Epic (expected release: 2009) ===
00. "Save The Day" (Hills, Candice Nelson, Balewa Muhammad, Ezekiel Lewis, J. Que)

00. "Surrounded" (Hills, Candice Nelson, Balewa Muhammad, Ezekiel Lewis, J. Que)

00. "Young Lovers" (Hills, Balewa Muhammad, Ezekiel Lewis, J. Que)

- All Produced by Danja Handz & The Clutch

00. "Who U Run 2" (Khayat, Candice Nelson, Balewa Muhammad, Ezekiel Lewis, J. Que)

- Produced by Red One

00. "Inside Out" (Kennedy, Candice Nelson, Balewa Muhammad, Ezekiel Lewis, J. Que)

00. "Pillow" (Kennedy, Candice Nelson, Ezekiel Lewis, J. Que)

- Both Produced by Brian Kennedy

=== One Chance – shelved album – J Records / US ===
00. "No Brainer"

- Produced by Warren "Oak" Felder

00. "Cuz I Love Her"

00. "Run It Back"

=== CJ – TBD – Capitol ===
00. "Fresh Pair Of Panties" (J. Que, Ezekiel Lewis)

00. "Tongue Twista" (J. Que, Ezekiel Lewis)

=== Southern Girl – TBD – Warner Bros. Records ===
00. "Like You Love It" (J. Que, Ezekiel Lewis)

00. "On Your Hood" (J. Que, Ezekiel Lewis)

=== Erika Rivera – TBD – Atlantic ===
00. "Here I Am" (Harrison, Candice Nelson, Keri Hilson, Balewa Muhammad, Ezekiel Lewis, J. Que)

- Produced by Rich Harrison

00. "Register" (Holmes, Candice Nelson, Balewa Muhammad, Ezekiel Lewis, J. Que)

- Produced by San "Chez" Holmes

=== Chapter 4 (formerly 3rd Storee) – shelved album – J ===
00. "2 Piece Juicy"

- Produced by Danja Handz

=== Megan Rochell – You, Me & The Radio (shelved album) – Def Jam ===
00. "It's On You" (Dixon, Keri Hilson, J. Que)

00. "Who Are They" (Dixon, Keri Hilson, J. Que)

- Both Produced by Antonio Dixon

00. "Outta My Mind" (Medor, Nesmith, J. Que, Keri Hilson, Hale, "Tab" Nkhereanye)

- Produced by The Corna Boyz

=== Se'cret – TBD – M11 Ent. ===
00. "Driveway"

=== The Goods – TBD – formerly The Clutch, Ent. ===
- TBD Album Tracks

=== Nikki Flores – This Girl – Epic ===
00. "Beautiful Boy" (Hills, Candice Nelson, Balewa Muhammad, Ezekiel Lewis, J. Que)

00. "Suffocate" (Hills, Candice Nelson, Balewa Muhammad, Ezekiel Lewis, J. Que)

00. "Painkiller" (Hills, Candice Nelson, Balewa Muhammad, Ezekiel Lewis, J. Que)

- All Produced by Danja Handz

=== Cristal Q. – TBD – Atlantic ===
00. "None Of That" (Scheffer, J. Que, Ezekiel Lewis, Candice Nelson)

00. "Impala" (Scheffer, Candice Nelson, J. Que, Ezekiel Lewis)

- Background vocals by Candice Nelson
- Both Produced by Jim Jonsin

00. "Watch This" (J. Que, Ezekiel Lewis, Candice Nelson)

00. "Let Me Go" (Candice Nelson, J. Que, Ezekiel Lewis)

- Background vocals by Candice Nelson

00. "Curfew" (J. Que, Ezekiel Lewis)

00. "I Can Tell" (J. Que, Ezekiel Lewis)

00. "Shake It Harder" (J. Que, Ezekiel Lewis)

=== Paula Campbell – I Am Paula Campbell – Epic ===
00. "Hit List" (Kidd, Candice Nelson, Keri Hilson, Ezekiel Lewis, J. Que)

- Produced by Brian Kidd
- Background vocals by Candice Nelson

00. "Upkeep" (Bunton, Cole, Candice Nelson)

- Produced by JB & Corron & The Clutch

=== Bayje – Curious – Atlantic ===
00. "Jealous Of A Whip" (Suecof, Candice Nelson, Keri Hilson, Balewa Muhammad, Ezekiel Lewis, J. Que)

00. "I Give Up" (Suecof, Candice Nelson, Ezekiel Lewis, J. Que)

00. "Mean Girls" (Suecof, Candice Nelson, Ezekiel Lewis, J. Que)

- All Produced by Infinity

00. "Problem" (Kidd, Candice Nelson, Balewa Muhammad, Ezekiel Lewis, J. Que)

- Background vocals by Candice Nelson

00. "Occupied" (Kidd, Candice Nelson, Ezekiel Lewis, J. Que)

00. "Wait" (Kidd, Candice Nelson, Balewa Muhammad, Ezekiel Lewis, J. Que)

- All Produced by Brian Kidd

00. "My Space" (Harris, Davis, Candice Nelson, Balewa Muhammad, Ezekiel Lewis, J. Que)

- Produced by Dre & Vidal

=== LeMarvin – TBD – Motown ===
00. "New Body Style" (Perez, Balewa Muhammad, Ezekiel Lewis, J. Que, Nkhereanye)

- Produced by Happy Perez, co-produced by The Clutch

00. "New Body Style (Alternate Version)" (Cain, Balewa Muhammad, Ezekiel Lewis, J. Que, Nkhereanye)

- Produced by Needlz (Khari Cain), co-produced by The Clutch

00. "All" (Colapietro, Dinkins, Candice Nelson, Keri Hilson, Balewa Muhammad, Ezekiel Lewis, J. Que)

00. "In The Air" (Colapietro, Dinkins, Candice Nelson, Keri Hilson, Balewa Muhammad, Ezekiel Lewis, J. Que)

- Both Produced by The Co-Stars

00. "Not My Day" (Thiam, Candice Nelson, Balewa Muhammad, Ezekiel Lewis, J. Que)

- Produced by Akon

=== Dear Jayne – Voice Message – Capitol ===
00. "Automatic" (Stewart, Candice Nelson, Keri Hilson, Balewa Muhammad, Ezekiel Lewis, J. Que)

- Produced by Tricky Stewart

=== Missez – TBD – Geffen ===
00. "Hangover" (Cox, Candice Nelson, Ezekiel Lewis, J. Que)

00. "Only One U" (non-album track) (Cox, Nkhereanye, Candice Nelson, Balewa Muhammad, Ezekiel Lewis)

- Placed On Fantasia's album "Fantasia".
- Both Produced by Bryan-Michael Cox

=== Melissa Jiménez – Signed, Sealed, Delivered – SRC / Universal Motown ===
00. "Wrong When You're Gone" (non-album track) (Baker, Candice Nelson, Keri Hilson', Ezekiel Lewis, J. Que)

- Produced by Bigg D & The Clutch
- Placed On Jennifer Lopez's album "Brave".

=== Sophia Fresh (formerly Girlfriends/Gyrlfriend) – TBD – Atlantic / Nappy Boy Ent. (formerly J) ===
00. "I'm Sprung" (J. Que, Ezekiel Lewis)

00. "Do It Anyway" (J. Que, Ezekiel Lewis)

00. "One" (J. Que, Ezekiel Lewis)

00. "Tongue Twista" (J. Que, Ezekiel Lewis)

00. "Shame On Love" (Antonio Dixon, Damon Thomas, Eric Dawkins, Michael Ripoll, Candice Nelson, J. Que, Ezekiel Lewis)

- Produced by Antonio Dixon

00. Other TBD Titles

=== Dana Lee – TBD ===
00. "Perfect World" (Medor, Nesmith, Hale, Keri Hilson, J. Que)

- Produced by The Corna Boyz

=== Jordyn Taylor – TBD ===
00. "Won't Play Nice"

- Background vocals by Candice Nelson

=== Money - Unlady Like ===
- TBD Titles

=== Jada – TBA – Universal / Motown ===
00. "Denial" (Hills, Candice Nelson, Balewa Muhammad, Ezekiel Lewis, J. Que, Araica)

- Produced by Danja Handz
- Other Tracks TBD

== Miscellaneous (ASCAP Registered) ==
- "Fit Like That" (Title Code: 362343037) – (Baker, Candice Nelson, Balewa Muhammad, Ezekiel Lewis)
  - Produced by Bigg D
- "Can't Shake Ya" (Title Code: 331362155) – (Stewart, "Tab" Nkhereanye, Keri Hilson, J. Que)
  - Produced by Tricky Stewart
- "Get Myself Together" (Title Code: 371198213) – (Smith, Candice Nelson, Keri Hilson, Ezekiel Lewis, J. Que)
- "Good Look" (Title Code: 371198277) – (Smith, Candice Nelson, Keri Hilson, Ezekiel Lewis, J. Que)
- "Gotta Know" (Title Code: 371198311) – (Smith, Keri Hilson, Ezekiel Lewis, J. Que)
- "Say" (Title Code: 493677993) – (Smith, Candice Nelson, Keri Hilson, Ezekiel Lewis, J. Que)
  - All Produced by Lil Jon
- "Greenlight" (Title Code: 371198339) – (Jones, Candice Nelson, Keri Hilson, Ezekiel Lewis, J. Que)
- "Move It Like This" (Title Code: 432134013) – (Jones, Candice Nelson, Keri Hilson, Ezekiel Lewis, J. Que)
  - Both Produced by Polow da Don
- "Letcha" (Title Code: 421918554) – (Cox, Candice Nelson, Keri Hilson, Ezekiel Lewis, J. Que)
  - Produced by Bryan-Michael Cox
- "She Ain't Me" (Title Code: 493678072) – (Kidd, Candice Nelson, Keri Hilson, Ezekiel Lewis, J. Que, Newt)
  - Produced by Brian Kidd
- "My Team" (Karlsson, Winnberg, Candice Nelson, Balewa Muhammad, Ezekiel Lewis, J. Que)
  - Produced by Bloodshy & Avant
- "Time Of My Life" (Title Code: 503095912) – (Jerkins, Keri Hilson, Balewa Muhammad, J. Que)
  - Produced by Fred "Uncle Freddie" Jerkins III
- "The Position" (Title Code: 503095654) – (Holland, Candice Nelson, Ezekiel Lewis)
  - Produced by Kwamé "K-1" Holland
- "Whatcha Here For" (Title Code: 531782117) – (Holmes, Candice Nelson, Balewa Muhammad, Ezekiel Lewis, J. Que, "Tab" Nkhereanye)
  - Produced by San "Chez" Holmes
- "Ain't You" (Title Code: 311346353) – (Lang, Keri Hilson, J. Que, Hamler)
  - Produced by Flash Technology
- "Little Bit" – (Harrison, Candice Nelson, Balewa Muhammad, Ezekiel Lewis, J. Que)
  - Produced by Rich Harrison
- "Monolopy Money" (Suecof, Candice Nelson, Balewa Muhammad, Ezekiel Lewis, J. Que)
  - Produced by Infinity
- "Next Best Thing" (Hudson, Candice Nelson, Balewa Muhammad, Ezekiel Lewis)
  - Produced by Eric Hudson
- "Rock" (Hollis, Candice Nelson, Balewa Muhammad, Ezekiel Lewis, J. Que)
- "The Introduction" (Hollis, Candice Nelson, Balewa Muhammad, Ezekiel Lewis, J. Que)
  - Both Produced by Hit-Boy
- "Time Will Tell" (Hills, Candice Nelson, Balewa Muhammad, Ezekiel Lewis, J. Que)
  - Produced by Danja Handz
- "What It's Like" (Warner, Candice Nelson, Balewa Muhammad, Ezekiel Lewis, J. Que)
- "Who Knows" (Warner, Candice Nelson, Balewa Muhammad, Ezekiel Lewis, J. Que)
  - Both Produced by Michael Warner

== Miscellaneous (BMI Registered) ==
- "Be Like That" (BMI Work #8438718) – (Colapietro, Dinkins, Candice Nelson, Keri Hilson, Balewa Muhammad)
  - Produced by The Co-Stars
- "Dream" (BMI Work #8348634) – (T. Taylor, Candice Nelson, Balewa Muhammad, Ezekiel Lewis, J. Que)
  - Produced by Troy Taylor
- "Notice Me" (BMI Work #8405518) – (Harrison, Candice Nelson, Keri Hilson, Balewa Muhammad, Ezekiel Lewis, J. Que)
  - Produced by Rich Harrison
  - Same Production as Tha Rayne - 'Didn't You Know"

== Miscellaneous (Harry Fox Registered) ==
- "Paper Man" (Kidd, Balewa Muhammad, J. Que)
  - Produced by Brian Kidd
