= Eric Hudson =

American record producer (born 1986)

- Born: Eric Lee Hudson; October 15, 1986 (age 39)
- Genres: Hip hop, R&B
- Occupations: Record producer, songwriter

Eric Lee Hudson (born October 15, 1986) is an American record producer. He has won three Grammy Awards, and contributed to sales of over 60 million units in the United States. He is perhaps best known for his co-production on Kanye West's 2007 single "Flashing Lights", which peaked within the top 30 of the Billboard Hot 100.

== Early life and career ==
His father, Curtis, is a music producer and songwriter best known for having co-written Madonna's 1983 song "Holiday". His biological mother, is singer/songwriter Lisa Stevens-Crowder, co-writer of the song "Holiday", by Madonna. His step-mom Phyllis Bivins-Hudson, is an educator for Rutgers University. Eric attended Columbia High School in Maplewood, New Jersey, and graduated in 2004.

He is a multi-instrumentalist (including piano, drums, bass, guitar, and organ), and honed much of his early music development playing in church and conducting his own jazz band, the Jazz Funk Project.

His early introduction into the industry began by working alongside hip hop producers Buckwild and DJ Kay Gee of Naughty by Nature. Hudson was an instrumentalist on two Billboard 200-number one albums, the Game's The Documentary and 50 Cent's The Massacre, which helped further his career. As his first song production to Billboard Hot 100, Hudson produced Omarion's 2006 single "Entourage".

== Accolades ==
Hudson has won three Grammy Awards and has been a part of over than 60 million records sold worldwide, with credits for artists including Whitney Houston, Mariah Carey, Chris Brown, Ne-Yo, Leona Lewis, John Legend, Kanye West, Dr. Dre, Mary J. Blige, and Trey Songz.

== Partial discography ==
2005

The Game - The Documentary

- 18. "Like Father, Like Son" (feat. Busta Rhymes) (live bass and keyboards)

50 Cent - The Massacre

- 21."I Don't Need Em" (live bass)

Wyclef Jean - Hotel Rwanda (original soundtrack)

- 00. "Million Voices" (keyboards)

2006

Omarion - 21

- 01. "Entourage"
- 03. "Electric"
- 11. "Been With a Star"

John Legend - Once Again

- 06. "P.D.A. (We Just Don't Care)"

Mila J - "Good Lookin' Out" single

- 00. "Good Lookin' Out" (feat. Marques Houston)

Ne-Yo - Because of You

- 03. "Can We Chill"
- 07. "Ain't Thinking About You"

Mary J. Blige - Reflections (A Retrospective)

- 03. "You Know"

2007

B5 - Don't Talk, Just Listen

- 11. "I Must Love Drama"

Lloyd - Street Love

- 11. "Take You Home"

Beanie Sigel - The Solution

- 04. "Go Low" (feat. Rock City)

Kanye West - Graduation

- 09. "Flashing Lights" (co-produced with Kanye West)

Kevin Michael - kevin Michael

- 05. "Vicki Secrets"
- 13. "Too Blessed"

Chris Brown - Exclusive

- 18. "Mama"

Leona Lewis - Spirit

- 10. "I'm You"

Trey Songz - Trey Day

- 09. "Fly Together" (feat. Jim Jones)

Mary J. Blige - Growing Pains

- 14. "Talk to Me"

Jordin Sparks - This Christmas soundtrack

- 2. "I'll Be Home for Christmas"

Brandy - Sweet Nothings (Unreleased)

- 00. "Love Me The Most"
- 00. "Back and Forth"
- 00. "Tell 'Em"
- 00. "Bring It Back (180)"
- 00. "Sober"
- 00. "Dig This"

2008

Brandy - Meet the Browns soundtrack

- 04. "Dig This"

Cheri Dennis - In and out of Love

- 09. "Pretend"

Tiffany Evans- Tiffany Evans

- 08. "About a Boy"

Raven-Symoné - Raven-Symoné

- 03. "In the Pictures"

Cherish - The Truth

- 06. "Before U Were My Man"

Jesse McCartney - Departure

- 08. "Told You So"
- 12. "Not Your Enemy"
- 13. "Oxygen"

Nas - Untitled Nas album

- 12. "Project Roach"
- 00. "Who Are You"

Lloyd - Lessons in Love

- 03. "Treat U Good"
- 04. "Year of the Lover"
- 08. "Love Making 101"

2009

Corbin Bleu - Speed of Light

- 03. "Moments that Matter"
- 05. "Champion"
- 07. "Whatever It Takes"
- 10. "Angel Cry"
- 11. "Close"

Flo Rida - R.O.O.T.S.

- 08. "Mind on My Money"

Jadakiss - The Last Kiss

- 15. "By My Side" (feat. Ne-Yo)

Trey Songz - Ready

- 06. "Does He Do It"

Whitney Houston - I Look to You

- 08. "Worth It"

Fat Joe - Jealous Ones Still Envy 2 (J.O.S.E. 2)

- 06. "Congratulations"

Mario - D.N.A.

- 06. "Stranded"

Amerie - In Love & War

- 02. "Heard 'em All"

2010

Brutha - "Can't Get Enough" single

- 00. "Can't Get Enough"

Trey Songz - Passion, Pain & Pleasure

- 9. "Made to Be Together"

Jamie Foxx - Best Night of My Life

- 02. "Best Night of My Life" (feat. Wiz Khalifa)
- 07. "Yep Dat's Me" (feat. Ludacris and Soulja Boy)
- 09. "Gorgeous"
- 10. "Let Me Get You on Your Toes" (interlude)
- 14. "All Said and Done"

Lyfe Jennings - I Still Believe

- 06. "Whatever She Wants"

Jaheim - Another Round

- 11. "Closer"

2011

Mary J. Blige - My Life II: The Journey Continues

- 06. "25/8"
- 10. "Why" (featuring Rick Ross)

Professor Green - At Your Inconvenience

- 10. "Doll"

Trey Songz - Inevitable

- 03. "I Do" (co-produced)
- 05. "Sex Ain't Better Than Love" (co-produced)

2012

Tank - This Is How I Feel

- 09. "Better Than Me" (co-produced)

Kendrick Lamar - GoodKid, M.A.A.D City

- 01. "The Recipe" (additional keyboards)

Rick Ross - God Forgives, I Don't

- 03. "3 Kings" (additional production, keyboards)

Trey Songz - Chapter V

- 03. "Panty Wetter"
- 14. "Without A Woman"

Bridget Kelly

- 00. "Special Delivery"

Keyshia Cole - Woman to Woman

- 03. "Missing Me"

Trevor Jackson - #NewThang EP (released Sept 2013)

- 05. "Like We Grown"
- 03. "One Girl"

2013

Justine Skye - Everyday Living (EP/executive produced)

- 01. "Everyday Living"
- 03. "Messin' w/ You" (feat. Joey BADA$$)
- 04. "Hardwork" (co-produced)
- 06. "Good by Now"
- 07. "I Don't Wanna" (Aaliyah cover)

K. Michelle - Rebellious Soul

- 02. "Damn"
- 09. "Hate on Her"
- 10. "When I Get a Man"

August Alsina - Downtown: Life Under the Gun

- 07. "Don't Forget About Me"

2014

August Alsina - Testimony

- 13. "Benediction"

Justin Bieber - single

- 00. "We Were Born for This"

Marsha Ambrosius - Friends & Lovers

- 05. "Shoes"
- 09. "La La La La La"
- 14. "Spend All My Time" (feat. Charlie Wilson)

K. Michelle - Anybody Wanna Buy a Heart?

- 07. "Maybe I Should Call"

Omarion - Sex Playlist (co-executive produced)

- 01. "Sex Playlist"
- 04. "Inside"
- 05. "Steam"
- 08. "Work"
- 09. "Deeper"

2015

Mariah Carey - #1 to Infinity

- 19. "Infinity"

Tyrese - Black Rose

- 03. "Picture Perfect" (produced with Rockwilder)
- 10. "When We Make Love"

2016

K. Michelle - More Issues Than Vogue

- 10. "Time"
- 14. "Life I Chose" (Best Buy Bonus Track)

Jakubi - 61 Barkly

- 01. "Bank Account"

2018

Justin Timberlake - Man of the Woods

- 08. "Morning Light" (featuring Alicia Keys)
- 15. "The Hard Stuff"

2019

Nas - The Lost Tapes 2

- 07. "Who Are You" (featuring David Ranier)

2021

Blair Perkins - Blair Perkins

- 03. "Boolin' (I'm Ready)"
- 04. "Flight"
- 05. "Voicemail (Interlude)"
- 06. "Be Alone"
- 07. "Care 4 Me"
- 08. "Come With Me"
- 10. "Exclusively Yours"

2022

The Isley Brothers - Make Me Say It Again, Girl

- 05. "My Love Song"
- 06. "Great Escape"

2024

Chris Brown - 11:11, (Deluxe)

- 13. "Residuals"
