= 25/8 =

25/8 may refer to:

- $25/8=3.125$, an approximation of pi used in ancient Babylon
- August 25, used in European style date
- The original title of the 2010 American film My Soul to Take
- "25/8" (song), a song by Mary J. Blige
- "25/8", a song by Bad Bunny on his 2020 album YHLQMDLG
