= Don't Mind (Mary J. Blige song) =

Single by Mary J. Blige

from the album My Life II... The Journey Continues (Act 1)
- Released: June 19, 2012
- Length: 4:21
- Label: Matriarch; Geffen
- Songwriters: Mary J. Blige; Priscilla Renea; Jerry "Wonda" Duplessis
- Producer: Duplessis

Mary J. Blige singles chronology
"Why" (2012)	"Don't Mind" (2012)	"F for You" (2014)

Music video
- "Don't Mind" on YouTube

"Don't Mind" is a song by American singer Mary J. Blige, recorded for her tenth studio album, My Life II... The Journey Continues (Act 1) (2011). It was written by Blige along with Priscilla Renea and Jerry "Wonda" Duplessis, while production helmed by the latter. The song was released by Matriarch Records and Geffen Records as the album's fourth and final single on June 19, 2012 in the United States, where it reached number 35 on the US Billboard Hot R&B/Hip Hop Songs chart.

== Background ==
"Don't Mind" was written by Blige, Priscilla Renea and Jerry Duplessis. Production on the track was also handled by Duplessis under his pseudonym Wonda. Blige's vocals were recorded by Serge "Sergical" Tsai, while Jaycen Joshua mixed the track.

== Music video ==
The music video for "Don't Mind" was directed by Colin Tilley. It features Blige dressed in a black catsuit singing about how she doesn’t mind telling her man she loves him. Singing straight to camera, she is seen performing in front of a graffiti laced wall.

== Credits and personnel ==
Credits adapted from the liner notes of My Life II... The Journey Continues (Act 1).

- Songwriting – Mary J. Blige, Priscilla Renea, Jerry Duplessis
- Production – Jerry Wonda
- Recording – Serge "Sergical" Tsai
- Mixing – Jaycen Joshua
- Mastering – Dave Kutch

== Charts ==
Weekly chart performance for "Don't Mind"
Chart (2012)	Peak position
US Hot R&B/Hip-Hop Songs (Billboard)	35
