= International (Kevin Michael album) =

Studio album by Kevin Michael
- Released: March 16, 2011
- Recorded: 2010–2011
- Genre: Pop
- Length: 41:09
- Label: JVC

Kevin Michael chronology
Kevin Michael (2007)	International (2011)	TBA

Singles from International
- 1. "Spread the Love" Released: March 10, 2011

International is the second studio album by American recording artist Kevin Michael, released in 2011 in Japan by Victor Entertainment.

== Singles ==
On March 2, 2011, Kevin Michael released the first single from the album titled "Spread the Love" featuring Emi Maria.

=== Commercial performance ===
The album was released 5 days after the Tsunami in Japan which had a dramatic effect on album sales. No official album sale statistics were released.

== Track listing ==
No.	Title	Length
1.	"The Answer"	4:09
2.	"International"	3:49
3.	"Teacher"	3:35
4.	"iHeart Girls"	3:42
5.	"Spread the Love" (featuring Emi Maria)	3:28
6.	"Tear Jar"	4:06
7.	"Animal"	3:53
8.	"SEMI"	3:19
9.	"Who Am I"	3:30
10.	"Breakup"	3:34
11.	"U Know U Love Me"	4:00
