= Entourage (song) =

Single by Omarion

from the album 21
- Released: July 3, 2006
- Length: 3:55
- Label: Epic; Sony
- Songwriter(s): Omari Grandberry; Andre Merritt; Eric Hudson
- Producer(s): Eric Hudson

Omarion singles chronology
"Let Me Hold You" (2005)	"Entourage" (2006)	"Ice Box" (2006)

Music video
- "Entourage" on YouTube

"Entourage" is a song by American singer Omarion. It was written by Omarion, Andre Merritt, and Eric Hudson for his second studio album 21 (2006), while production was helmed by Hudson. The song was released as the album's first single and reached the top 30 on the New Zealand Singles Chart and on the US Hot R&B/Hip-Hop Songs. The official remix features rapper 50 Cent.

== Music video ==
The video sees Omarion arriving at a party where fans are anxiously awaiting his arrival. While stepping out of the car, he sees a girl in front of him and tries to get some time to talk to her but keeps on being interrupted by fans etc. During the bridge we see Omarion, at times singing against a black and gold backdrop. Omarion also performs a short dance routine with several other dancers. The video ends with him and the girl leaving the party in his car. There are cameos made by former B2K member Lil Fizz, Tyrese Gibson & Tommy Davidson.

== Track listing ==
UK CD 1
No.	Title	Writer(s)	Producer(s)	Length
1.	"Entourage" (Album Version)	Omari Grandberry; Andre Merritt; Eric Hudson	Hudson	3:54
2.	"The Truth"	Grandberry; Cory Bold	Bold	3:16

UK CD 2
No.	Title	Writer(s)	Producer(s)	Length
1.	"Entourage" (Album Version)	Grandberry; Merritt; Hudson	Hudson	3:54
2.	"The Making of You"	Grandberry; Hudson	Hudson	3:25
3.	"Entourage" (Video)			3:54

UK CD reissue
No.	Title	Writer(s)	Producer(s)	Length
1.	"Entourage" (Album Version)	Omari Grandberry; Andre Merritt; Eric Hudson	Hudson	3:54
2.	"Entourage" (B&B Soul Boy Remix)	Grandberry; Merritt; Hudson	Hudson; Bob & Barn^{[a]}	3:15
3.	"Entourage" (Wookie Remix)	Grandberry; Merritt; Hudson	Hudson; Wookie^{[a]}	5:29
4.	"Entourage" (Wookie Dub)	Grandberry; Merritt; Hudson	Hudson; Wookie^{[a]}	5:29
5.	"Entourage" (Video)			3:54

Notes

- ^{^[a]} signifies an additional producer

== Charts ==
Chart (2006)	Peak position
New Zealand (Recorded Music NZ)	30
Scotland (OCC)	84
UK Singles (OCC)	58
UK Hip Hop/R&B (OCC)	15
US Billboard Hot 100	78
US Hot R&B/Hip-Hop Songs (Billboard)	25
US Rhythmic (Billboard)	25

== Release history ==
List of release dates, showing region, release format, label catalog number, and reference
Region	Date	Format(s)	Label	Edition(s)
United States	July 3, 2006	CD; digital download	Epic; Sony Music	Standard edition
United Kingdom	September 25, 2006	CD; digital download	Epic; Sony Music	Standard edition
United Kingdom	May 28, 2007	CD; digital download	Epic; Sony Music	Reissue
