= 25/8 (song) =

Single by Mary J. Blige

from the album My Life II... The Journey Continues (Act 1)
- Released: September 1, 2011
- Recorded: 2011
- Genre: R&B; hip hop soul
- Length: 3:56
- Label: Matriarch; Geffen
- Songwriters: Mary J. Blige; Crystal Johnson; Eric Hudson; Kenneth Gamble; Leon Huff; Al Sherrod Lambert
- Producers: Hudson; Blige

Mary J. Blige singles chronology
"The Living Proof" (2011)	"25/8" (2011)	"Mr. Wrong" (2011)

Music video
- "25/8" on YouTube

"25/8" is a song by American R&B recording artist Mary J. Blige. It was written by Blige, Crystal Johnson, Al Sherrod Lambert, and Eric Hudson for her tenth studio album, My Life II... The Journey Continues (Act 1) (2011), while production was handled by Blige and the latter. An R&B and soul song, "25/8" is built on drum splashes and a fluttering flute, and samples from B. T. Express's rendition of "Now That We Found Love", written by Kenneth Gamble and Leon Huff. Lyrically, it features the female protagonist expressing her need to have more than 24 hours a day, 7 days a week to spend time with her love interest.

"25/8" was generally well received by music critics, who noted it as one of the highlights from My Life II and complimented both Hudson's production and Blige's vocal performance. Selected as the album's first official single, following the release of promotional buzz track "Someone to Love Me (Naked)," it was released digitally on September 1, 2011. Commercially, "25/8" became Blige's first lead single to miss the US Billboard Hot 100, though it peaked at number 35 on the Hot R&B/Hip-Hop Songs chart and entered the top ten on Billboard's Adult R&B Songs chart. The song's accompanying music video was directed by Diane Martel.

== Background ==
"25/8" written by Blige, Crystal Johnson, Al Sherrod Lambert, and Eric Hudson, while production was helmed by Blige and Hudson. Conceptualized by Johnson, it was created around its title when she experienced a long wait. She later elaborated: "I think I was leaving some hibachi spot and I think they had a long wait and I was like “ain’t enough hours in a day for this. I’m hungry, I need to eat now.” I kept saying 24/7, 24/7 and I was like what about, what comes after seven, oh yea eight. I literally think like that. So I’m like “25/8”... that sounds like a song. It’s a dope title but what does it mean."

== Release and promotion ==
"25/8" was released to iTunes and Amazon as a digital download on September 1, 2011. Blige performed the song for the first time live on Good Morning America September 2, 2011. Blige also performed "25/8" on Dancing with the Stars October 4, 2011.

== Critical reception ==
While critical reaction toward its parent album My Life II... The Journey Continues (Act 1) was generally mixed, "25/8" was lauded by contemporary music critics. Kanya King, writing for CNN International, felt that "25/8" was "a track that meets all of the criteria of what Mary J. Blige is all about: It's soul meets hip hop with her rough vocals complementing the track. A true great among us and like a fine wine, only gets better with age." Allmusic editor Andy Kellman wrote that "chest-beating pleader “25/8” clearly aims for classic status with a Gamble/Huff sample." In his review for PopMatters, David Masciotra commented that the "feisty orchestral swing of "25/8" is a particular highlight," commending the "great looseness to Blige’s voice, a voice that has always sounded incredibly natural and pure and, in fact, she has never sounded better than on this record."

PopCrush writer Trent Fitzgerald called "25/8" a "beautiful love anthem sounds like a strong R&B hit to our ears with its climatic violins, fluttering flutes and live drums." He compared the song to other Motown era compositions but "was remixed for our modern times." The New York Times found that the unhappiness on "25/8" still "motivates her best work," declared it a "fragile, baleful, speechy [...] upbeat, hip-hop/gospel" track. Caryn Ganz of Rolling Stone rated the song three stars out of five, writing that "it's goopy stuff, but it's also far more neck-poppin' fun than Beyoncé's '1+1'." In his review of My Life II, Consequence of Sound editor Siobhán Kane found that while songs like “25/8” "don’t work as well (in the context of her classic record My Life) [...] they do showcase her powerful vocal, which is searing."

== Music video ==
Blige filmed the video for 25/8 in late September 2011. The director of the video is Diane Martel. The video premiered on October 28, 2011.

== Track listings ==
Promo 12"
No.	Title	Writer(s)	Producer(s)	Length
1.	"25/8" (Main version)	Blige; Crystal Johnson; Eric Hudson; Kenneth Gamble; Leon Huff; Al Sherrod Lambert	Hudson; Blige	3:55
2.	"25/8" (Remix featuring Fred the Godson)	Blige; Johnson; Hudson; Gamble; Huff; Lambert; Frederick Thomas	Hudson; Blige	3:55
3.	"Next Level" (featuring Busta Rhymes)	Blige; Butler; Trevor Smith, Jr.; Nathaniel Hills	Danja	4:13
4.	"Feel Inside" (featuring Nas)	Blige; Andrea Martin; Jerry "Wonda" Duplessis; Arden Altino; Nasir Jones; Dennis Coles; Robert Diggs; Gary Grice; Lamont Hawkins; Darryl Hill; Jason Hunter; Russell Jones; Clifford Smith; Elgin Turner; Corey Woods	Duplessis; Altino^{[a]}	5:07
5.	"Ain't Nobody"	David "Hawk" Wolinski	Darkchild	4:03
6.	"Ain't Nobody" (Remix)	Wolinski	Darkchild	4:03
7.	"Mr. Wrong" (featuring Drake)	James Scheffer; Aubrey Graham; Richard Butler, Jr.; Daniel Morris; Kenneth Gamble; Leon Huff; Cary Gilbert	Jim Jonsin; Rico Love	4:01
8.	"Midnight Drive" (featuring Brook Lynn)	Butler; Pierre Medor	Love; Medor	4:12

Notes

- ^{^[a]} denotes additional producer(s)

== Credits and personnel ==
Credits adapted from the liner notes of My Life II... The Journey Continues (Act 1).

- Production – Eric Hudson, Mary J. Blige
- Additional instruments – Ron Fair
- Recording – Danny Cheung
- Recording assistance – Jon Nettlesby
- Mixing – Jaycen Joshua
- Mixing assistance – Jesus Garnica
- Additional Mixing – Peter Mokran, Kendu Isaacs
- Mastering – Dave Kutch

== Charts ==
Chart performance for "25/8"
Chart (2011)	Peak position
South Korea International (Circle)	22
Japan Hot 100 (Billboard)	85
US Adult R&B Songs (Billboard)	8
US Hot R&B/Hip-Hop Songs (Billboard)	35

== Release history ==
Release history and formats for "25/8"
Region	Date	Format(s)	Label	Ref
United States	September 1, 2011	Digital download	Matriarch; Geffen	
United States	September 26, 2011	Urban radio	Matriarch; Geffen	
United States	September 27, 2011	Urban Adult radio	Matriarch; Geffen	
Australia	October 4, 2011	Contemporary Hit Radio	Geffen	
United Kingdom	November 20, 2011	Digital download	Geffen; Polydor	
