= My Life II... The Journey Continues (Act 1) =

Studio album by Mary J. Blige
- Released: November 21, 2011
- Genres: Hip-hop soul; R&B
- Length: 57:08
- Labels: Matriarch; Geffen
- Producers: Brandon "BAM" Alexander; Arden Altino; BridgeTown; Danja; Sean Garrett; Calvin Harris; Eric Hudson; Kendu Issac; Rodney Jerkins; Jim Jonsin; Lil' Ronnie; Rico Love; Pierre Medor; Kevin Randolph; Harmony Samuels; StarGate; Tricky Stewart; Tank; Team S. Dot; Martin Terefe; The Underdogs; Jerry Wonda

Mary J. Blige chronology
Stronger with Each Tear (2009)	My Life II... The Journey Continues (Act 1) (2011)	A Mary Christmas (2013)

Singles from My Life II... The Journey Continues (Act 1)
- 1. "25/8" Released: September 1, 2011; 2. "Mr. Wrong" Released: October 28, 2011; 3. "Why" Released: April 10, 2012; 4. "Don't Mind" Released: June 19, 2012

My Life II... The Journey Continues (Act 1) is the tenth studio album by American singer and songwriter Mary J. Blige, released on November 21, 2011, by Geffen Records and Matriarch Records. Titled as the sequel and serving as a thematic extension to her 1994 breakthrough album My Life, which portrayed a dark period in Blige's personal life, it talks about the themes of struggle, heartbreak, and strength while reflecting the growth and evolution she had experienced since the release of its predecessor.

Production for the album took place during 2010 to 2011 at several recording studios in New York City and Los Angeles and was handled by a variety of musicians, including Jerry Duplessis, Danja, Eric Hudson, Tricky Stewart, Soundz, The Underdogs and others. Upon its release, My Life II earned generally positive reviews and debuted at number five on the US Billboard 200 chart with first week sales of 156,000 copies. It was eventually certified gold by the Recording Industry Association of America (RIAA).

Geffen Records issued several singles in support of the album, including promotional single "Someone to Love Me (Naked)", lead single "25/8", the Adult R&B Songs top three hit "Don't Mind" and "Mr. Wrong" featuring Drake, the latter of which became a top ten hit on the US Hot R&B/Hip-Hop Songs chart and won the NAACP Image Award for Outstanding Duo or Group. From August 2012 to June 2013, Blige promoted My Life II on her The Liberation Tour, co-headlined by singer D'Angelo.

== Background ==
In December 2009, Blige's ninth studio album, Stronger with Each Tear, was released. It became her ninth consecutive studio album to have debuted at the top of the US Top R&B/Hip-Hop Albums chart and won Blige Outstanding Female Artist and Outstanding Album at the 41st NAACP Image Awards. By August 2010, the singer had already begun work on her tenth studio album, involving collaborators such as Swizz Beatz, Kanye West, The Underdogs, Jerry Duplessis, Arden Altino, Lil Ronnie, Jay-Z, Timbaland, Salaam Remi, Maxwell, Alicia Keys, Raphael Saadiq, Ester Dean, J.U.S.T.I.C.E. League, Johnta Austin, Eric Hudson, Q-Tip, Sean Garrett, DJ Premier, Gorilla Tek, Don Pooh, Ne-Yo, and Drumma Boy. Blige revealed during her Music Saved My Life Tour, that she was in no rush to release the album and she had not given it a title yet. A song called "Anything You Want" featuring Busta Rhymes and Gyptian leaked online in August 2010.

Backstage at the 2010 MTV Video Music Awards, when speaking of approach to the new album, Blige described crafting sonic heat similar to her first two studio albums but plan to update the vintage Blige sound, telling that "[it will be] more like a What's the 411? of 2012. It's headed [in] that direction but in a new [way]. Not what it used to be. Right now, it's going in the Mary direction, which is R&B and hip-hop and soul. If it goes into the club direction, it will probably be more soulful than futuristic." On June 21, 2011, a track titled "Feel Inside" apparently featuring Nicki Minaj leaked online. In an interview with MTV it was revealed that the track was in fact two separate songs that the duo were respectively working on, but that someone had put together. Blige revealed that despite the fake collaboration, Minaj and Blige would be collaborating on a song.

In terms of what she wanted to achieve musically with the album, Blige herself told Blues & Soul: "With so much techno and four-to-the-floor and general loss of live instrumentation going on today, to me people are not doing real music any more. And so with this album I really wanted people to remember when music was about quality instead of quantity [...] I basically wanted to separate myself and give everybody back what I feel music today is missing." Finished in Los Angeles, New York City and Atlanta, Blige decided to name the album My Life II after going through a phase of self-knowledge following the release of The Breakthrough (2005). The album sees her looking toward the future while acknowledging the past: "From me to you, My Life II… Our journey together continues in this life. It's a gift to be able to relate and identify with my fans at all times. This album is a reflection of the times and lives of people all around me."

== Release and promotion ==
Originally scheduled for a September 20, 2011 release, My Life II... The Journey Continues (Act 1) was later pushed back to November 21, 2011. A deluxe edition for the album was made available only in the United States.

=== Live performances ===
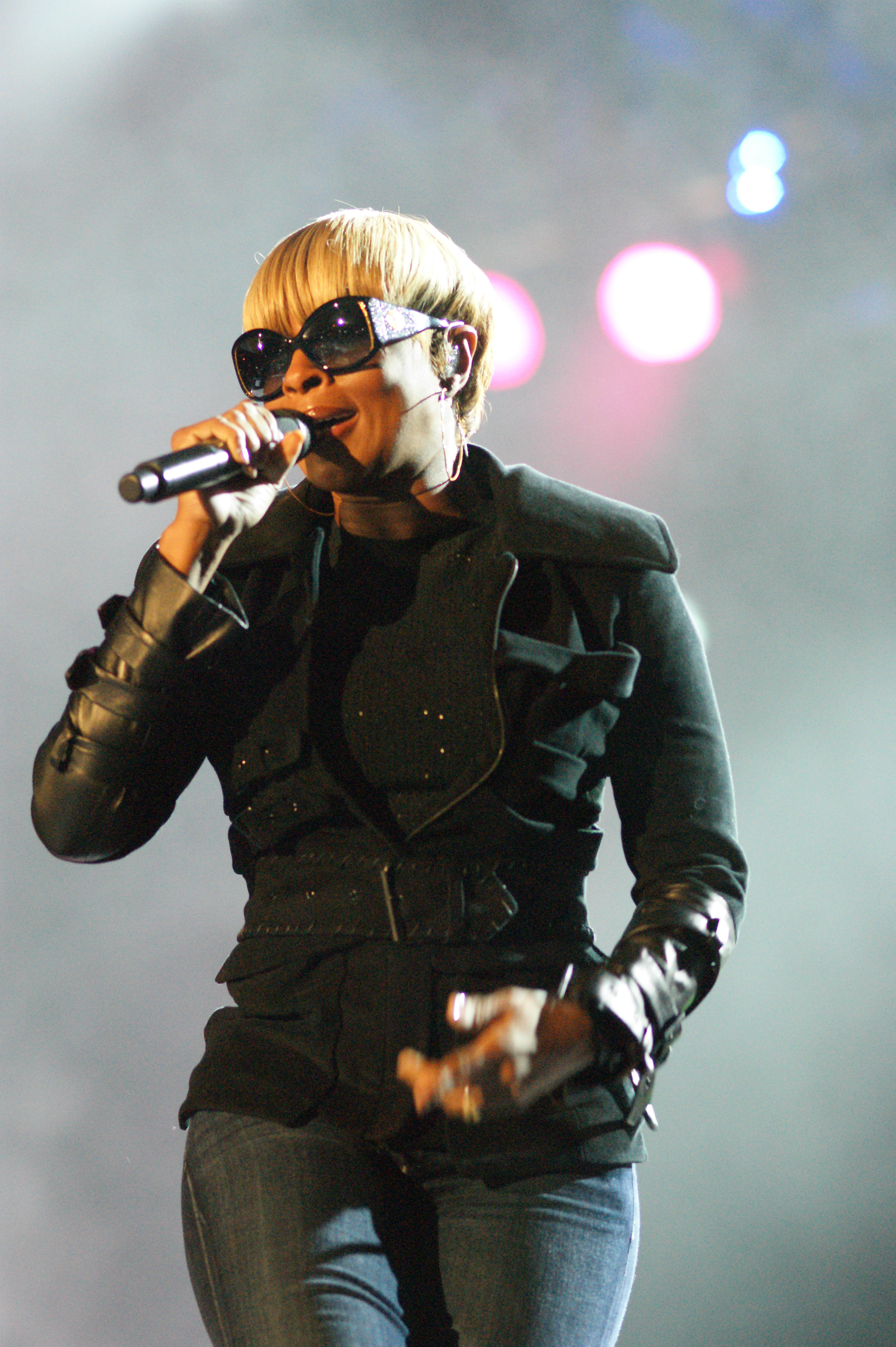
Blige promoted My Life II and its singles at numerous events.

Blige embarked on promotional tours and live performances for My Life II... The Journey Continues (Act 1) and its accompanying singles through the United Kingdom and North America. Promotion began with a live performance of the album's lead single on September 1, 2011, at the ABC morning television program Good Morning America. On October 4, 2024, Blige performed "25/8" on the dance competition television series Dancing with the Stars. On October 20, Blige debuted the song "Need Someone" at Perez Hilton's "One Night In… New York City" benefit concert for GLSN. Blige also performed the song on British music television show Later... with Jools Holland on November 1, 2011. Blige was a guest on the UK morning show, Daybreak (November 2) and Alan Carr: Chatty Man (November 6) to discuss the new album and single.

Throughout the month of November, Blige performed at numerous shows, including Black Girls Rock! (November 6), the TeenNick HALO Awards (November 6), the American Music Awards (November 20), Macy's Thanksgiving Day Parade (November 24), The Today Show (November 25), Chelsea Lately (November 25), CBS News Sunday Morning (November 27) and The View (November 29). In addition to this, Blige will also embark on a U.S. tour to promote the album. On the tour Blige will perform the original My Life album in its entirety, with shows in Oakland (November 11), Los Angeles (November 17), New York City (November 23) and Atlanta (November 25). The Los Angeles date will be shown live on Vevo November 17, 2011 at 11PM EST. The concert event Mary J. Blige: Unstaged was directed by Adam Shankman.

HSN and Blige aired a special My Life Concert on November 30. In addition to this, Blige sold her perfume, My Life Blossom, during the special. Fans had the chance to purchase the limited-edition My Life Blossom Holiday Gift Set, including the My Life Blossom Eau de Parfum and Body Cream plus the HSN-Exclusive My Life II...The Journey Continues (Act 1) album. Blige performed "Need Someone" along with "Family Affair" at the ninth annual WWE Tribute to the Troops that aired on December 13, 2011, on the USA Network and December 17, 2011, on NBC. On December 19, 2011, Blige performed at "VH1 Divas Celebrates Soul". Blige also be performed on CBS' annual Home for the Holidays which aired December 21. On February 2, 2012, Blige performed "Mr Wrong", and "The Living Proof" on The Wendy Williams Show.

== Singles ==
"25/8" was released for digital download on September 1, 2011, as the album's first single. Produced and co-written by Eric Hudson, Blige performed the song live for the first time at Good Morning America on September 2, 2011. The song debuted on the Billboard's US Hot R&B/Hip Hop Songs chart at number ninety-four, and has eventually peaked at number thirty-five. "Mr. Wrong", featuring Canadian musician Drake, was released as the second single from the album on October 28, 2011. Co-produced by Jim Jonsin and Rico Love, "Mr. Wrong" impacted Urban radio on November 8, 2011. "Why" featuring rapper Rick Ross and "Don't Mind" were chosen as the next singles from the album. The music videos for "Why" and "Don't Mind" were filmed in March 2012. Blige performed "Why" for the first time on American Idol on March 8, 2012.

=== Other songs ===
"Someone to Love Me (Naked)", a reworked version of the song "Someone to Love Me" by Diddy – Dirty Money from their album Last Train to Paris (2010) that features Lil Wayne, and Diddy, was released as first promotional single of the album in March 2011. Produced by Jerry "Wonder" Duplessis, and Arden Altino, the song samples "You Roam When You Don't Get It At Home" as performed by The Sweet Inspirations. A music video for the song was premiered online on April 4, 2011. Blige, and Wayne performed the song live for the first time at the 2011 Billboard Music Awards on May 22, 2011. The song initially debuted on the US Hot R&B/Hip Hop Songs chart at number ninety-nine before falling off, only to return, and subsequently peak at number twenty-eight. "The Living Proof" hit the internet on July 5, 2011. Produced by The Underdogs, it served as the official soundtrack for the period drama film The Help (2011). A music video for the song was released online on August 10, 2011. "The Living Proof" debuted on Billboard's Adult Contemporary chart at number twenty-seven on November 3, 2011. "Ain't Nobody", a cover of singer Chaka Khan 1983 song, debuted and peaked at number 55 on the Swiss Singles Chart.

== Critical reception ==
Professional ratings
Aggregate scores
Source	Rating
Metacritic	72/100
Review scores
Source	Rating
AllMusic	3/5 stars
Consequence	C+
The Daily Telegraph	4/5 stars
Entertainment Weekly	B−
The Guardian	3/5 stars
Los Angeles Times	2.5/4 stars
musicOMH	4/5 stars
Rolling Stone	3.5/5 stars
Slant Magazine	3/5 stars
Spin	7/10

My Life II... The Journey Continues (Act 1) received generally positive reviews from music critics. At Metacritic, which assigns a normalized rating out of 100 to reviews from mainstream critics, the album received an average score of 72, based on 15 reviews, which indicates "generally favorable reviews". Martyn Young of musicOMH called it "a wonderfully assured collection of classy R&B pop that can justifiably rank amongst her best work," and commented that its ballads "are never grandiose or overblown and Blige's perfectly poised vocals are genuinely affecting." BBC Music's Lloyd Bradley dubbed the album "Blige's most enjoyable, exciting and consistent album in years" and complimented its music as a "clever updating" of her past hip-hop soul. The Daily Telegraph stated, "with the right collaborators [Blige] can conjure golden moments when the listener is transported simultaneously to the church pew and the dancefloor." Rolling Stone writer Jody Rosen called Blige "admirably unfashionable, staying in her sweet spot of midtempo hip-hop soul," adding that "she can still make pain pleasurable."

However, Andy Gill of The Independent was ambivalent towards its "bumpy emotional terrain," adding that "by the time she's berating some partner for not listening to her, your sympathies wane." Kevin Ritchie of NOW panned the album's "easy-listening ballads" and characterized Blige's direction as "dull and predictable." Entertainment Weekly's Adam Markovitz commented that "Blige can still rip your heart out with a note," but criticized "the lovelorn lyrics" and "'modern' touches." Rebecca Nicholson of The Guardian called it "a surprisingly robust return to form [...] elegant, refined and, for the most, part up-to-date," but also found it "far too long" and criticized the "listlessness and sentimentality" of its ballads. Slant Magazine's Eric Henderson disliked Blige's "lapses into self-pity", but commended the "slow burn" of the album's second half as "her most credible adult-contemporary music since 1999's Mary." AllMusic editor Andy Kellman stated, "Those who are hoping for something in the spirit of mid-'90s Blige might be disappointed and think of the title as a ploy, but those who expect a wide variety of material in terms of style and mood will get precisely that."

Los Angeles Times writer Mikael Wood stated, "She gets away with the dramatics because she makes them so easy to buy: No working soul singer depicts struggle (and its hard-won defeat) more believably than Blige does, even when armed with so-so material, as she often is here." Although he found its ballads "a little toothless", Evan Rytlewski of The A.V. Club stated, "What My Life II lacks in a single vision, though, it makes up for with consistently rousing performances from Blige, whose radiant voice has only grown fuller and bluesier with time." Peter S. Scholtes of Spin complimented the "funky, mid-tempo beauties such as 'Irreversible,' 'Midnight Drive,' and 'Someone to Love Me (Naked)'" and stated, "Amid overwrought theatrical gestures, MJB still finds a slinky groove." David Masciotra of PopMatters commented that "despite its flaws, [it] is an immensely enjoyable and impressive album," commending its "four song, mid-album set of soulful R&B" and "closing trio of ballads."

== Commercial performance ==
My Life II... The Journey Continues (Act 1) debuted at number five on the US Billboard 200 in the week ending November 30, 2011, with first-week sales of 156,000 copies. In its second week, it dropped to number six on the chart, selling an additional 72,000 copies. On March 19, 2012, the album was certified gold by the Recording Industry Association of America (RIAA) for sales of over 500,000 copies. By March 2012, it had sold 763,200 copies in the United States. In the United Kingdom, My Life II... The Journey Continues (Act 1) opened at number 76 on the UK Albums Chart. It also peaked at number eight on the UK R&B Albums chart.

== Track listing ==
US Standard edition
No.	Title	Writer(s)	Producer(s)	Length
1.	"Intro"	Mary J. Blige; Jerry "Wonda" Duplessis; Kendu Isaac; Arden Altino; Sean Combs	Duplessis; Isaacs; Altino; Olivier "Akos" Castelli	1:16
2.	"Feel Inside" (featuring Nas)	Blige; Andrea Martin; Duplessis; Altino; Nasir Jones; Dennis Coles; Robert Diggs; Gary Grice; Lamont Hawkins; Darryl Hill; Jason Hunter; Russell Jones; Clifford Smith; Elgin Turner; Corey Woods	Duplessis; Altino^{[A]}	5:07
3.	"Midnight Drive" (featuring Brook Lynn)	Richard Butler, Jr.; Pierre Medor	Rico Love; Medor	4:12
4.	"Next Level" (featuring Busta Rhymes)	Blige; Butler; Trevor Smith, Jr.; Nathaniel Hills	Danja	4:13
5.	"Ain't Nobody"	David "Hawk" Wolinski	Darkchild	4:03
6.	"25/8"	Blige; Crystal Johnson; Eric Hudson; Kenneth Gamble; Leon Huff; Al Sherrod Lambert	Hudson; Blige	3:55
7.	"Don't Mind"	Blige; Priscilla Renea; Duplessis	Duplessis	3:57
8.	"No Condition"	Blige; Kevin Cossom; Marcella Araica; Hills	Danja	4:27
9.	"Mr. Wrong" (featuring Drake)	James Scheffer; Aubrey Graham; Butler; Daniel Morris; Gamble; Huff; Cary Gilbert	Jim Jonsin; Love	4:01
10.	"Why" (featuring Rick Ross)	Blige; Dave Young; Hudson; William Roberts II	Hudson	4:21
11.	"Love a Woman" (featuring Beyoncé)	Blige; Sean Garrett; Beyoncé Knowles; Menardini Timothee	Garrett; Team S. Dot^{[A]}; BridgeTown^{[B]}	4:31
12.	"Empty Prayers"	Blige; Christopher "Tricky" Stewart; Johnson; Kenneth Coby	Stewart; Soundz	3:15
13.	"Need Someone"	Matt Morris	Martin Terefe	3:55
14.	"The Living Proof"	Blige; Thomas Newman; Harvey Mason; Damon Thomas	The Underdogs	5:55
Total length:				57:08

Japanese edition
No.	Title	Writer(s)	Producer(s)	Length
12.	"Irreversible"	Harmony Samuels; Courtney Harrell; Donnell Shawn; Bryan Clark; Blige	Harmony	3:53
13.	"Empty Prayers"	Blige; Stewart; Johnson; Coby	Stewart; Soundz	3:15
14.	"Need Someone"	Morris	Martin Terefe	3:55
15.	"The Living Proof"	Blige; Newman; Mason; Thomas	The Underdogs	5:55
16.	"Miss Me With That"	Amber Streeter; Mason; Thomas; Mansur Zafr; Lamar Edwards	The Underdogs; Mansur Zafr	4:00
17.	"Someone to Love Me (Naked)" (featuring Lil Wayne & Diddy)	Blige; Duplessis; Combs; Leroy Watson; Betty Crutcher; David Poter; Tony Williams; Dwayne Carter	Duplessis; Altino^{[A]}	3:32
18.	"You Want This"	Blige; Mason; Thomas; Eric Dawkins; Dewain Whitmore Jr.; Joi Campbell; Adonis Shropshire; Kevin Randolph	The Underdogs; Randolph^{[A]}	4:14
19.	"This Love Is for You"	Blige; Ester Dean; Stewart	Stewart	3:46
20.	"One Life"	Blige; Dean; Mikkel S. Eriksen; Tor Erik Hermansen; Calvin Harris	StarGate; Harris	3:43
Total length:				80:16

US Deluxe edition additional tracks
No.	Title	Writer(s)	Producer(s)	Length
15.	"Irreversible"	Samuels; CHarrell; Shawn; Clark; Blige	Harmony	3:53
16.	"Miss Me With That"	Streeter; Mason; Thomas; Zafr; Edwards	The Underdogs; Zafr	4:00
17.	"Someone to Love Me (Naked)" (featuring Lil Wayne & Diddy)	Blige; Duplessis; Combs; Watson; Crutcher; Poter; Williams; Wayne; Carter	Duplessis; Altino^{[A]}	3:32
Total length:				68:13

UK edition additional tracks
No.	Title	Writer(s)	Producer(s)	Length
15.	"You Want This"	Blige; Mason; Thomas; Dawkins; Whitmore Jr.; Campbell; Shropshire; Randolph	The Underdogs; Randolph^{[A]}	4:14
16.	"This Love Is for You"	Blige; Dean; Stewart	Stewart	3:46
17.	"One Life"	Blige; Dean; Eriksen; Hermansen; Harris	StarGate; Harris	3:43
18.	"Someone to Love Me (Naked)" (featuring Lil Wayne & Diddy)	Blige; Duplessis; Combs; Watson; Crutcher; Poter; Williams; Carter	Duplessis; Altino^{[A]}	3:32
Total length:				72:23

US iTunes Store bonus track
No.	Title	Writer(s)	Producer(s)	Length
18.	"Get It Right" (featuring Taraji P. Henson)	Blige; Johnson; Ronnie Jackson	Lil Ronnie; Brandon "B.A.M." Alexander	4:08
Total length:				74:21

Notes

- ^{^[A]} denotes co-producer
- ^{^[B]} denotes additional producer

Sample credits

- "Feel Inside" contains elements of "Triumph" (1997) as performed by Wu-Tang Clan.
- "Someone to Love Me (Naked)" contains elements of "You Roam When You Don't Get It At Home" (1968) as performed by The Sweet Inspirations.

== Charts ==
=== Weekly charts ===
Weekly chart performance for My Life II... The Journey Continues (Act 1)
Chart (2011)	Peak position
Australian Albums (ARIA)	177
Dutch Albums (Album Top 100)	95
French Albums (SNEP)	143
German Albums (Offizielle Top 100)	93
Italian Albums (FIMI)	96
Japanese Albums (Oricon)	61
Swiss Albums (Schweizer Hitparade)	31
UK Albums (Official Charts)	76
UK R&B Albums (Official Charts)	8
US Billboard 200	5
US Top R&B/Hip-Hop Albums (Billboard)	2

=== Year-end charts ===
2012 year-end chart performance for My Life II... The Journey Continues (Act 1)
Chart (2012)	Position
US Billboard 200	34
US Top R&B/Hip-Hop Albums (Billboard)	5

2013 year-end chart performance for My Life II... The Journey Continues (Act 1)
Chart (2013)	Position
US Top R&B/Hip-Hop Albums (Billboard)	100

== Certifications ==
Certifications for My Life II... The Journey Continues (Act 1)
Region	Certification	Certified units/sales
United States (RIAA)	Gold	500,000^{^}
^{^} Shipments figures based on certification alone.

== Release history ==
Release history and formats for My Life II... The Journey Continues (Act 1)
Region	Date	Format(s)	Label	Edition(s)	Ref
Australia	November 18, 2011	CD; digital download	Geffen	Standard	
Austria	November 18, 2011	CD; digital download	Geffen	Standard	
Germany	November 18, 2011	CD; digital download	Geffen	Standard	
Japan	November 18, 2011	CD; digital download	Geffen	Standard	
Netherlands	November 18, 2011	CD; digital download	Geffen	Standard	
New Zealand	November 18, 2011	CD; digital download	Geffen	Standard	
Spain	November 18, 2011	CD; digital download	Geffen	Standard	
Sweden	November 18, 2011	CD; digital download	Geffen	Standard	
Switzerland	November 18, 2011	CD; digital download	Geffen	Standard	
Canada	November 21, 2011	CD; digital download	Geffen	Standard	
France	November 21, 2011	CD; digital download	Geffen	Standard	
United Kingdom	November 21, 2011	CD; digital download	Polydor	Standard	
United States	November 21, 2011	CD; digital download	Matriarch; Geffen	Standard; deluxe	
