= Why (Mary J. Blige song) =

Single by Mary J. Blige featuring Rick Ross

from the album My Life II... The Journey Continues (Act 1)
- Released: April 10, 2012
- Recorded: 2011
- Genre: R&B; hip hop soul
- Length: 4:21
- Label: Matriarch, Geffen
- Songwriters: Mary J. Blige, Dave Young, Eric Hudson, William Roberts II
- Producer: Eric Hudson

Mary J. Blige singles chronology
| "Mr. Wrong" (2011) | "Why" (2012) | "Don't Mind" (2012) |

Rick Ross singles chronology
| "Take It to the Head" (2012) | "Why" (2012) | "Stay Schemin'" (2012) |

Music video
- "Why?" on YouTube

"Why" is a song performed by American recording artist Mary J. Blige, from her tenth studio album, My Life II... The Journey Continues (Act 1) (2011). It was written by Blige along with Dave Young, Eric Hudson, and William Roberts II, with Hudson producing the song and Rick Ross having featured vocals. A soulful R&B song that makes use of hip hop soul influences and a beat-heavy, strings–led production, the song initially impacted on US radios on April 10, 2012 as the album's third single.

== Music video ==
The song's accompanying music video was directed by Colin Tilley and debuted on May 9, 2012. In the video, Blige finds herself up late worrying about a troubled relationship. It begins a dimly lit bedroom where she sings next to her sleeping lover. Moving on, she hits an extravagant lounge. There, Rick Ross is surrounded by women with a drink in one hand and an expensive cigar in the other. Blige joins Rick Ross for a final performance at the lounge. The two, both dressed in white, complement each other as they perform under a chandelier. The video ends with a final toast and falling confetti.

== Credits and personnel ==
Credits adapted from the liner notes of My Life II... The Journey Continues (Act 1).

- Songwriting – Mary J. Blige, Dave Young, Eric Hudson, William Roberts II
- Production – Eric Hudson
- Recording – Serge "Sergical" Tsai
- Mastering – Dave Kutch

== Charts ==
| Chart (2012) | Peak position |
|---|---|
| Canada Urban AC (Billboard) | 36 |
| US Hot R&B/Hip-Hop Songs (Billboard) | 30 |
