= The Living Proof =

Single by Mary J. Blige

from the album The Help: Music from the Motion Picture
- Released: August 16, 2011
- Recorded: 2011
- Genre: Soul; pop
- Length: 5:57
- Label: Geffen
- Songwriters: Mary J. Blige; Harvey Mason, Jr.; Thomas Newman; Damon Thomas
- Producer: The Underdogs

Mary J. Blige singles chronology
"Someone to Love Me (Naked)" (2011)	"The Living Proof" (2011)	"25/8" (2011)

"The Living Proof" is a song by American recording artist Mary J. Blige for the soundtrack of the 2011 film The Help. The song was later included on her tenth studio album My Life II... The Journey Continues (Act 1) (2011). Blige composed the song along with the film's score composer Thomas Newman as well as Harvey Mason, Jr. and Damon Thomas from production team The Underdogs. "The Living Proof" is a traditional power ballad with contemporary R&B elements. The song garnered positive reviews from contemporary critics, who praised its lyrical content and Blige's vocals. It was nominated for the Best Original Song category at the 69th Golden Globe Awards, but lost to "Masterpiece", performed by Madonna.

== Production ==
Essence.com explained the production of the song"

“I wrote the song almost in the theater as I was watching the movie. Everything that made me cry, I would write it down. Everything that made me laugh, I would write it down. And then I would listen to different things they were saying and I would write it down.” Blige says she called the song "The Living Proof" in honor of the characters' resilience and ability to forgive. "Learning how to forgive people that hurt you. That's the hardest thing to do," she said. "My song tells the story of how we are all survivors, and how we're living proof that we can come through whatever."

== Charts ==
=== Weekly charts ===
Chart (2011)	Peak position
Adult Contemporary (Billboard)	27
