= Mr. Wrong (song) =

Single by Mary J. Blige featuring Drake

from the album My Life II... The Journey Continues (Act 1)
- Released: October 28, 2011
- Length: 4:01
- Label: Matriarch; Geffen
- Songwriters: James Scheffer; Aubrey Drake Graham; Richard Preston Butler; Danny Morris; Kenneth Gamble; Leon Huff; Cary Gilbert
- Producers: Jim Jonsin; Rico Love

Mary J. Blige singles chronology
"25/8" (2011)	"Mr. Wrong" (2011)	"Why" (2012)

Drake singles chronology
"Make Me Proud" (2011)	"Mr. Wrong" (2011)	"The Motto" (2011)

Music video
- "Mr. Wrong" on YouTube

"Mr. Wrong" is a song taken from American R&B singer Mary J. Blige's album My Life II... The Journey Continues (Act 1) (2011). It features rapper Drake. The song was written by Drake, Jim Jonsin, Danny Morris, and Rico Love, while production was helmed by Jonsin and Love. The song contains a sample from "Me and Mrs. Jones" (1972) by American singer Billy Paul. Due to the inclusion of the sample, Kenneth Gamble, Leon Huff, and Cary Gilbert are also credited as songwriters. The song was released as the album's second official single on October 28, 2011.

== Background and release ==
In the song, she keeps finding herself attracting the wrong type of men. According to the somber cut, she keeps falling for bad boys despite what her family tells her. She sings: "Bad boys ain't no good/ Good boys ain't no fun,". while the Toronto rapper Drake appears and confesses: "Don't it seem like I'm always there when it matters, but missing most of the other time, a terrible pattern." The song was debuted by Mary on Angie Martinez's Hot 97 show and released as the second single from her tenth studio album My Life II... The Journey Continues (Act 1).

== Composition ==
"Mr. Wrong" was written by James Scheffer, Kevin Gamble, Aubrey Drake Graham, Cary Gilbert, Leon Huff, Rico Love and Daniel Morris and produced by Jim Jonsin and Rico Love. It features an interpolation of Billy Paul's 1972 number-one hit "Me and Mrs. Jones." It is a hip-hop/R&B-esque tune. The co-writer and co-producer Rico Love told Rap-Up.com that he based it on his own chequered lovelife: "It's an extremely soulful song that expresses the true level of love that a woman can have for a man who simply is no good for her," said Love. "I wrote it because in many ways I am Mr. Wrong."

Rico Love came up with the song when he was working in the studio with Jim Jonsin. He told "The Boombox": "It came to me when I heard the chorus to the song. It's pretty fast the way my process is - I don't over-think; I don't sit down and come up with concepts. Usually the music kinda tells me what to say. I kinda figure out instantly what I feel like a track is gonna say. With 'Mr. Wrong,' I felt like it described myself and my relationships that I have with women. It's kinda autobiographical for me. I'm just describing what I've heard women in my life say to me."

== Critical reception ==
Andy Gill wrote for The Independent that "The high priestess of emotional turmoil returns to her apparently turbulent personal life on this latest album, vacillating between obsessive devotion, self-assertive morale-boosting and the kind of masochistic abasement depicted in 'Mr Wrong'." Trent Fitzgerald wrote a positive review for Pop Crush stating that "Once again, Mary J. Blige brings the drama with her brand of tortured soul that should resonate with her diehard fans. Hopefully, it will inspire them to find a Mr. Right in their life." Rap-Up wrote: "The R&B diva finds herself falling for bad boys over the slinky Jim Jonsin and Rico Love production."

Monica Herrera wrote a favorable review for Rolling Stone, analyzing that "The headstrong groove of Blige's early ballads syncs up surprisingly well with the hollowed-out R&B of guest Drake, who sounds keenly aware, if not really conflicted, that the best kind of leading man in Blige's world is a lowdown creep." Becky Bain of Idolator described the song as a "mellow, sorrowful tune". MusicOMH's Martyn Young wrote that "Drake offers a rather forgettable verse to the song", which he called "perfectly titled." Sióbhan Kane from Consequence of Sound praised Drake's appearance, saying that "it works brilliantly with its slow-moving quality that slopes along."

== Music video ==
The music video was filmed on September 30, 2011. It was directed by Diane Martel and released on December 19, 2011. Drake does not appear in this version of the video and his verse is omitted. Amidst disco balls and smoke, Blige poses and dances in a variety of throwback looks, harkening her My Life era. An alternative version of the video featuring Drake was released on January 10, 2012. Drake is seen standing against a brick wall flooded in blue lights. The rest of the visuals remain mostly unchanged.

=== Reception ===
Idolator's Becky Bain criticized the fact that Drake is not on the video, writing directly to Blige: "you got Drizzy for your song, but left his presence completely off the single? Wha? Explain the method of your madness, Mary!." While Essence magazine enjoyed the video, writing that she "caps off her 2011 with a stunning video" and also saying that "From start to finish, it's a visually pleasing clip depicting her in the most beautiful light possible -- with big hair, bold outfits and flawless makeup. The video's glamour treatment suits the mellow and dramatic mood of the song. Marc Hogan from Spin wrote an extensive article about the video, first saying: "Showing a magnificently blonde-coiffed Blige, black-clad backup dancers, and (why not?) a stripper pole, the clip was perfect for the Drake-phobic, but it missed out on the Eve-and-her-serpent element that helps make the original track work. He also commented Drake's appearance, writing: "It's Drake's puppy-dog-eyed manipulator routine that keeps Blige's powerfully wounded vocals grounded in reality: She may fall in love with the wrong guys, but she does it for good reasons. Just not the right ones. In the end, he concluded stating: "The rest of the video looks little changed from its precursor. More stripper pole, more synchronized dancing, more color-changing lighting."

== Credits and personnel ==
Credits adapted from the liner notes of My Life II... The Journey Continues (Act 1).

- Songwriting – James Scheffer, Aubrey Drake Graham, Butler, Danny Morris, Gamble, Huff, C. Gilbert
- Production – Jim Jonsin, Rico Love
- Recording – Nikolas Marzouca, Pierre Medor
- Mixing – Robert Marks
- Mastering – Dave Kutch

== Charts ==
=== Weekly charts ===
Weekly chart performance
Chart (2011–2012)	Peak position
South Korea International (Circle)	23
US Billboard Hot 100	87
US Hot R&B/Hip-Hop Songs (Billboard)	10
US R&B/Hip-Hop Airplay (Billboard)	9

=== Year-end charts ===
Year-end chart performance
Chart (2012)	Position
US Hot R&B/Hip-Hop Songs (Billboard)	26
US Ringtones (Billboard)	19

== Release history ==
Release history and formats for "25/8"
Region	Date	Format(s)	Label	Ref
United States	October 28, 2011	Digital download	Matriarch; Geffen	
United States	November 8, 2011	Urban radio	Matriarch; Geffen	
