= The Royal Court =

- Years active: 2006-present
- Members: Jerome "J-Roc" Harmon; Solomon "King" Logan; Johnkenun Spivery
- Past members: James "Jim Beanz" Washington

The Royal Court is a music production team formed by producer Timbaland and Solomon "King" Logan. Their first work was the single "Ice Box" by Omarion from the album 21, co-produced with Timbaland.

== Discography ==
=== 2006 ===
==== Omarion - 21 ====
- "Ice Box" (prod. by King Logan, Johnkenun Spivery, Timbaland )
- "Beg For It" (prod. by King Logan, Johnkenun Spivery, Timbaland )

=== 2007 ===
==== Bobby Valentino - Special Occasion ====
- "Anonymous" (prod. by King Logan and Timbaland)
- "Rearview (Ridin)" (prod. by King Logan, Jerome Harmon, and Timbaland, )

==== Omarion & Kat DeLuna - Feel The Noise OST ====
- "Cut Off Time" (prod. by King Logan, Johnkenun Spivery and Timbaland)

==== Mario - Go! ====
- "No Definition" (prod. by King Logan and Timbaland, )

==== NLT - Not Like Them ====
- "She Said, I Said" (prod. by King Logan, Johnkenun Spivery, and Timbaland)

==== The DEY - The DEY Has Come EP ====
- "Get The Feeling" (prod. by Timbaland, King Logan, Johnkenun Spivery)

=== 2008 ===
==== Ashlee Simpson - Bittersweet World ====
- "Outta My Head (Ay Ya Ya)" (prod. by King Logan, Jerome Harmon, and Timbaland)
- "Murder (I Get Away..)" (prod. by King Logan, Jerome Harmon, and Timbaland)
- "Bittersweet World" (prod. by King Logan, Jerome Harmon, and Timbaland)
- "Rag Doll" (prod. by King Logan, Jerome Harmon, and Timbalandn)
- "Rule Breaker" (prod. by King Logan, Jerome Harmon, and Timbaland)
- "What I've Become" (prod. King Logan, Jerome Harmon, and Timbaland)

=== 2009 ===
==== Chris Cornell - Scream ====
- "Enemy" (prod. by King Logan, Jerome Harmon, Timbaland, and Ryan Tedder)

==== Keri Hilson - In a Perfect World… ====
- "Slow Dance" (prod. by King Logan and Johnkenun Spivery)

==== Omarion feat Lil Wayne - ====
- "Comfort" (prod. by King Logan)

==== Rihanna - ====
- "Like It" (prod. by King Logan)

==== Jennifer Lopez - Love? ====
- "Countdown"
- "Whippin My Hair"
