= Ice Box (song) =

2006 single by Omarion

Single by Omarion

from the album 21
- Released: November 6, 2006
- Genre: R&B; pop
- Length: 4:16
- Label: T.U.G.; Sony Urban Music; Epic
- Songwriters: Omari Grandberry; Tim Mosley; King Logan; John Spivery; Patrick Smith; Ezekiel Lewis; Keri Hilson
- Producer: The Royal Court

Omarion singles chronology
"Entourage" (2006)	"Ice Box" (2006)	"Cut Off Time" (2007)

"Ice Box" is the second single from American singer-songwriter Omarion's second album, 21. The song features uncredited backing vocals and production by Timbaland. The song peaked at number 12 on the US Billboard Hot 100 and remains Omarion's highest-charting single in the US. "Ice Box" also reached the top 20 in Denmark, New Zealand, and the United Kingdom. The liner notes credit the production to the Royal Court, whose members include King and Sir John of Timbaland's Camp.

The single was released on November 6, 2006, influenced by the romantic relationship between Omarion and his girlfriend that had come to an end. In an interview discussing the song, Omarion explains that he and his girlfriend at the time had two different worlds and the timing was not right. An official remix was later released featuring R&B singer Usher. There is another version of the remix featuring an additional verse by Fabolous.

== Composition ==
"Ice Box" has a moderate tempo and it is written in the key of E-flat major.

== Music video ==
The video starts off with Omarion sitting at a table alone, with flashes of the video. The camera digitally goes inside of Omarion's body and stops to show his beating heart frigid cold. The icy blue heart represents the loneliness Omarion was feeling and also a sense of his pain. The metaphor illustrates Omarion's heart "trapped in an Ice Box". The camera zooms out of his body and the music begins. Omarion's girlfriend, played by Solange Knowles, appears sitting opposite him at the table. Throughout his video, his girlfriend will appear, disappear, and then reappear. The video is then taken into a forest like setting, where Omarion chases his girlfriend around. Scenes cut to Omarion dancing along with male backup dancers, (Choreography completed by Roland Tabor and Blake Anthony). The video ends with Omarion down on his knees after saying "...I'm tired of fighting", and Timbaland rides up in a Phantom and opens the door to let Omarion in. Omarion then puts on a pair of sunglasses and looks at Timbaland who taps the girl on the shoulder before they drive away.

== Charts ==
"Ice Box" is Omarion's most successful single as a solo artist in the United States, as well as his first solo single to chart within the top 20 on the Billboard Hot 100. It has been certified gold in the US as of July 2007. In the United Kingdom, "Ice Box" became Omarion's biggest hit, charting at number 14, becoming his first top-20 single there.

=== Weekly charts ===
Chart (2006–2007)	Peak position
Australia (ARIA)	36
Australian Urban (ARIA)	8
Canada Hot 100 (Billboard)	94
Denmark (Tracklisten)	14
European Hot 100 Singles (Billboard)	52
Germany (GfK)	40
New Zealand (Recorded Music NZ)	10
Scotland Singles (Official Charts)	31
UK Singles (Official Charts)	14
UK Hip Hop/R&B (Official Charts)	2
US Billboard Hot 100	12
US Dance Club Songs (Billboard)	12
US Hot R&B/Hip-Hop Songs (Billboard)	5
US Pop Airplay (Billboard)	13
US Rhythmic Airplay (Billboard)	3

=== Year-end charts ===
Chart (2007)	Position
Australian Urban (ARIA)	48
UK Urban (Music Week)	15
US Billboard Hot 100	45
US Hot R&B/Hip-Hop Songs (Billboard)	19
US Rhythmic Airplay (Billboard)	32

== Certifications ==
Region	Certification	Certified units/sales
New Zealand (RMNZ)	Platinum	30,000^{‡}
United Kingdom (BPI)	Silver	200,000^{‡}
United States (RIAA)	Gold	500,000^{^}
^{^} Shipments figures based on certification alone.^{‡} Sales+streaming figures based on certification alone.

== Release history ==
Region	Date	Format(s)	Label(s)	Ref.
United States	November 6, 2006	Rhythmic contemporary radio	T.U.G.; Sony Urban Music; Epic	
United States	November 20, 2006	Contemporary hit radio	T.U.G.; Sony Urban Music; Epic	
United Kingdom	February 19, 2007	CD	RCA	
