= Kevin Michael (album) =

Studio album by Kevin Michael
- Released: October 2, 2007
- Length: 57:07
- Label: Atlantic
- Producers: Bloodshy & Avant, Josh Deutsch, Eric Hudson, Wyclef Jean, Brian Kidd, The Clutch, Lester Mendez, J.R. Rotem, Shea Taylor

Kevin Michael chronology
Kevin Michael (2007)	International (2011)

Kevin Michael is the debut album by American singer Kevin Michael, released by Atlantic Records on October 2, 2007 in the United States. Three singles were released from the album: "We All Want the Same Thing", "It Don't Make Any Difference to Me", and "Ain't Got You". Kevin Michael and his mother did a joint interview in the November issue of Sister 2 Sister magazine.

== Critical reception ==
Professional ratings
Review scores
Source	Rating
About.com	3/5 stars
AllMusic	3.5/5 stars
laut.de	2/5 stars
PopMatters	7/10
Rolling Stone	3/5 stars

AllMusic editor Marisa Brown felt that "with songs that could fit equally on pop radio as they could R&B, Michael does his best Michael Jackson-meets-Prince-meets-Justin Timberlake (hardly a stretch) impression on his debut self-titled full-length. The results aren't wholly imaginative or unique, but Kevin Michael has a good enough voice, and a good enough production staff and group of writers behind him, to sound competent, even fun." Christian Hoard from Rolling Stone wrote that "on his debut, Michael makes bright R&B for people who think Chris Brown isn’t pop-friendly enough. At his worst, the young Philadelphian sounds green, relying too much on vocal swoops and falsettos and over-employing cutesy singsong choruses. But on friendly jams like the lovestruck "Hood Buzzin" and the slinky, Prince-esque "We All Want the Same Thing," Michael is a confident hookmeister and born crowd pleaser."

BBC Music critic Nick Street felt that Kevin Michael's problem was "that it seeks to cover many different vibes — several being thrown into one tune — but it doesn't remotely distinguish itself from other artists out there in this genre [...] It's a worthy attempt in a field that's already saturated. Let's just hope he can develop himself further in future." Michael Endelman, writing for Spin, found that while "We All Want the Same Thing" was a "clever let’s-just-all-get-along party cut, powered by a chugging slide guitar vamp and a sprightly Lupe Fiasco rap," [...] the "rest of the album buries otherwise thrilling moments [...] amid a steady stream of generic R&B." David Hilzendegen from laut.de noted that "dDespite appearances by Wyclef and Q-Tip, it remains pretty inconsequential."

== Commercial performance ==
In the United States, Kevin Michael peaked at number 24 on the US Billboard Heatseekers chart and number 90 on the magazine's Top R&B/Hip-Hop Albums chart.

== Track listing ==
Kevin Michael track listing
No.	Title	Writer(s)	Length
1.	"We All Want the Same Thing" (featuring Lupe Fiasco)	Fiasco; Aimee Allen; Henrik Jonback; Christian Karlsson; Kevin Seward; Pontus Winnberg; Andrew Wyatt	4:26
2.	"It Don't Make Any Difference to Me" (featuring Wyclef Jean)	Jean; Jerry Duplessis; Seward; Wyatt	4:05
3.	"Can't Get Enuff" (featuring Shorty Da Kid)	Jordan Johnson; Shea Taylor; Seward; Wyatt	3:29
4.	"Ha Ha Ha"	Chastity Nwagbara; James Phillips; Seward	3:14
5.	"Vicki Secrets"	Lester Mendez; Seward; Wyatt	3:35
6.	"Hood Buzzin"	Patrick "J. Que" Smith; Ezekiel "Zeke" Lewis; Balewa Muhammad; Candice Nelson; Karlsson; Magnus Wallbert; Winnberg	2:53
7.	"Ain't Got You"	Wyatt	4:22
8.	"Stone Cold Killa"	Jean Baptist; Mike McHenry; Seward; Wyatt	3:10
9.	"Weekend Jumpoff"	Smith; Lewis; Muhammad; Nelson; J. R. Rotem	3:21
10.	"Love Letter"	Brian Kidd; Nwagbara; Seward	4:14
11.	"Ghost"	Smith; Lewis; Muhammad; Nelson	3:57
12.	"Liquid Lava Love"	Kidd; Seward	4:26
13.	"Too Blessed" (featuring Q-Tip)	Kamaal Fareed; Eric Hudson; Irvine Weldon; Muhammad Jones; Seward; Malik Taylor	3:53
14.	"We All Want The Same Thing" (Acoustic)	Fiasco; Allen; Jonback; Karlsson; Seward; Winnberg; Wyatt	4:03
15.	"It Don't Make Any Difference to Me" (Acoustic)	Jean; Duplessis; Seward; Wyatt	4:06
Total length:			57:07

== Charts ==
Weekly chart performance for Kevin Michael
Chart (2007)	Peak position
French Albums (SNEP)	81
Swiss Albums (Schweizer Hitparade)	81
US Heatseekers Albums (Billboard)	24
US Top R&B/Hip-Hop Albums (Billboard)	90
