= Someone to Love Me (Naked) =

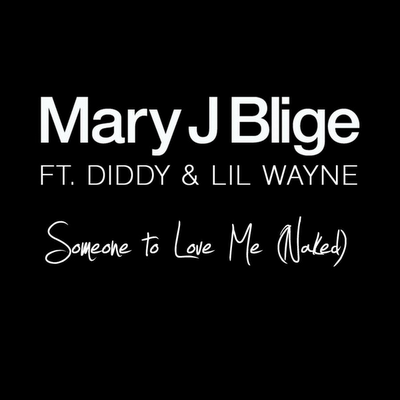

Promotional single by Mary J. Blige featuring Diddy and Lil Wayne

from the album My Life II... The Journey Continues (Act 1)
- Released: March 29, 2011
- Recorded: 2010
- Genre: R&B; hip-hop soul
- Length: 3:33
- Label: Matriarch; Geffen
- Songwriters: Jerry Duplessis; Leroy Watson; Dwayne Carter; Sean Combs; Mary J. Blige; Bettye Crutcher; David Porter; Ronald Williams
- Producers: Jerry Wonder; Arden Altino

Mary J. Blige chronology
We Got Hood Love (2010)	Someone to Love Me (Naked) (2011)	The Living Proof (2011)

Diddy chronology
Ass on the Floor (2010)	Someone to Love Me (Naked) (2011)	I'm on You (2011)

Lil Wayne chronology
This Is What Rock n' Roll Looks Like (2011)	Someone to Love Me (Naked) (2011)	I'm Into You (2011)

Music video
- "Someone to Love Me (Naked)" on YouTube

"Someone to Love Me (Naked)" is a song recorded by American singer Mary J. Blige for her tenth studio album My Life II... The Journey Continues (Act 1) (2011). It features guest vocals by American rappers Diddy and Lil Wayne. "Someone to Love Me (Naked)" was written by Blige, Jerry Wonda and Leroy Watson, and was produced by Wonda. The song is a remix of "Someone to Love Me" from Diddy-Dirty Money's debut studio album, Last Train to Paris (2010). It samples "You Roam When You Don’t Get It At Home" performed by The Sweet Inspirations. It was released on March 29, 2011, as the first promotional single from the album.

"Someone to Love Me (Naked)" is a R&B and hip hop soul song. The song peaked at number 28 on the US Hot R&B/Hip-Hop Songs chart. Blige and Lil Wayne performed a rendition of the single at the 2011 Billboard Music Awards on May 22, 2011. The song's accompanying music video was released on April 5, 2011.

== Background and composition ==
"Someone to Love Me (Naked)" is a R&B and hip-hop soul song, written by Jerry "Wonder" Duplessis and Leroy Watson. It is a remix of a song titled "Someone to Love Me" by Diddy-Dirty Money, from their 2010 album Last Train to Paris. Both the original and remix of "Someone to Love Me" sample "You Roam When You Don’t Get It At Home" performed by The Sweet Inspirations and written by Bettye Crutcher, David Porter and Ronnie Williams. On January 4, 2011, Angie Martinez premiered the new version of "Someone to Love Me" on her radio show. At the time it was dubbed "Someone to Love Me (MJB Naked Mix)." In the remix, Blige takes over the sample vocals. On March 29, 2011, Blige released the remix to digital retailers under the title "Someone to Love Me (Naked)," as the first single from her tenth album, My Life II... The Journey Continues (Act 1).

== Promotion ==
Mary J. Blige and Lil' Wayne performed "Someone to Love Me (Naked)" at the Billboard Music Awards on May 22, 2011.

== Music video ==
Blige filmed a video for "Someone to Love Me (Naked)" with Colin Tilley in 2011. It features appearances from both Diddy and Lil Wayne. She revealed, through social networking site Twitter, that the video would premiere on April 8, 2011. The video for "Someone to Love Me (Naked)" was supposed to premier through the Vevo network on April 4, 2011, however it leaked online a day earlier than planned after the released date was bumped up to April 5, 2011. The television debut for the video aired on April 5, 2011 following BET’s “The Game.” The video spotlights a blonde Mary as she wanders through a disorienting corridor and sings on the edge of a broken bridge, later linking up with Diddy and Lil Wayne as lightning flashes around them.

== Track listing ==
- Digital download
1. "Someone to Love Me" (featuring Diddy & Lil Wayne) – 3:33

== Charts ==
=== Weekly charts ===
Weekly chart performance for "Someone to Love Me (Naked)"
Chart (2011)	Peak position
Netherlands (Urban Top 100)	23
Romania (Romanian Top 100)	96
South Korea International (Circle)	46
US Bubbling Under Hot 100 (Billboard)	8
US Hot R&B/Hip-Hop Songs (Billboard)	28

=== Year-end charts ===
Year-end chart performance for "Someone to Love Me (Naked)"
Chart (2011)	Position
US Hot R&B/Hip-Hop Songs (Billboard)	99

== Release history ==
Release history and formats for "Someone to Love Me (Naked)"
Region	Date	Format(s)	Label	Ref
United States	March 29, 2011	Digital download	Matriarch; Geffen	
United States	April 12, 2011	Rhythmic airplay	Matriarch; Geffen	
