= 21 (Omarion album) =

Studio album by Omarion
- Released: December 26, 2006
- Recorded: 2005–2006
- Studios: Various: Maddhouse Recording Studios (Los Angeles); Larrabee Sound Studios (Los Angeles); Brandon's Way (Los Angeles); The Boom Boom Room (Burbank); South Beach Studios (Miami); Record Plant (Los Angeles); The Underlab (Los Angeles)
- Genre: R&B
- Length: 45:15
- Labels: T.U.G.; Epic; Sony Urban
- Producers: Timbaland; The Neptunes; Eric Hudson; Johnkenum Spivery; King Logan; Rufus Blaq; Cory Bold; Bryan-Michael Cox; WYLDCARD; Eric Dawkins

Omarion chronology
| O (2005) | 21 (2006) | Face Off (2007) |

Singles from 21
- 1. "Entourage" Released: July 3, 2006; 2. "Ice Box" Released: October 31, 2006; 3. "Beg For It" Released: May 1, 2007

21 is the second studio album by American R&B singer Omarion. It was released on December 26, 2006, by Epic Records and Sony Urban Music. The album was produced by Timbaland, The Neptunes, Eric Hudson and Bryan-Michael Cox and saw Omarion co-write every song on the album. The album's title was inspired from when Omarion turned 21 years old months before the album's release.

The album spawned two singles: "Entourage" and "Ice Box". Exclusively at Walmart, 21 was packaged with a bonus DVD titled BET Presents Omarion (2006). The DVD features BET and performance highlights, and music videos from Omarion's solo career. 21 also received mildly positive reviews from critics, who saw it as an improvement over his debut record O (2005). The album debuted at number one on the US Billboard 200, selling 119,000 copies in its first week.

The European edition add a bonus track: "Man Up", featuring Korean singer Rain.

== Critical reception ==
Professional ratings
Review scores
| Source | Rating |
|---|---|
| About.com | 2.5/5 stars |
| AllMusic | 4/5 stars |
| DJBooth | 3.5/5 stars |
| Entertainment Weekly | B |
| Stylus Magazine | B+ |
| USA Today | 2/4 stars |

21 received mildly positive reviews from music critics. Andy Kellman of AllMusic gave it an "Album Pick" title, praising the production throughout and Omarion for putting more input as a songwriter and performer, saying that he "truly surpassed his status as the former member of a boy band." DJ Z of DJBooth commented on the lyricism feeling mature and the production showing more sophistication, saying that "Omarion's second album is a welcome addition to his musical catalog and should appeal to both his fan base and a more adult crowd." Thomas Inskeep of Stylus Magazine also praised the album for its production and having a good ratio of solid-to-great songs. Putting it alongside Ciara's The Evolution for "best straight-up R&B album" he said that "the pair leave plenty of encouragement about the future of the genre."

Steve Jones of USA Today gave 21 a two-and-a-half-star rating, praising his transition from teen idol to a more mature R&B artist. He highlighted Omarion's likability and growth, noting that while some songs lacked impact, the album showed artistic progress. Damien Scott of Vibe also gave a mixed review, saying that Omarion lacked range in his performance and that he's "never fully in charge." Mark Edward Nero of About.com was also mixed towards the album, praising the first two singles but found the other tracks above-average at best, in terms of production and vocal quality that "range from average ("Obsession," Made For TV,") to fair ("Midnight," "Beg For It")." He concluded with: "Although O's taken a step forward in establishing himself as an adult solo artist, he still hasn't completely arrived yet. But at only 21 years of age, he's still got plenty of room to grow."

== Commercial performance ==
The album debuted at number one on the US Billboard 200, selling 119,000 copies in its first week. This became Omarion's first US number one debut and his second US top-ten album. In its second week, the album dropped to number ten on the chart, selling an additional 42,000 copies. As of November 2008, the album has sold over 390,000 copies in the United States.

== Track listing ==
| No. | Title | Writer(s) | Producer(s) | Length |
|---|---|---|---|---|
| 1. | "Entourage" | Omari Grandberry; Eric Hudson; André Merritt | Hudson | 4:58 |
| 2. | "Ice Box" (featuring Timbaland) | Grandberry; Keri Hilson; Johnkenum Spivery; Ezekiel Lewis; Timothy Mosley; Antonio Dixon; King Logan; Patrick Smith | Spivery; Logan; Timothy "Timbaland" Mosley | 5:15 |
| 3. | "Electric" | Granberry; Hudson; Merritt | Hudson | 3:25 |
| 4. | "Made for TV" | Bryan-Michael Cox; Adonis Shropshire | Cox; Kendrick "WYLDCARD" Dean^{[a]} | 4:46 |
| 5. | "Just Can't Let You Go" | Cox; Shropshire | Cox; WYLDCARD^{[a]} | 3:03 |
| 6. | "Obsession" | Pharrell Williams | The Neptunes | 4:13 |
| 7. | "Midnight" | Eric Dawkins; Dixon; Grandberry; Harvey Mason, Jr.; Steve Russell; Damon Thomas | Dawkins; The Underdogs | 3:58 |
| 8. | "Just That Sexy" | Dawkins; Dixon; Grandberry; Mason, Jr.; Russell; Thomas | Dawkins; The Underdogs | 3:48 |
| 9. | "Beg for It" | Sean Garrett; Mosley | Spivery; Logan; Timbaland | 2:56 |
| 10. | "Do It" | Dawkins; Dixon; Grandberry; Mason, Jr.; Russell; Thomas | Dawkins; The Underdogs | 3:54 |
| 11. | "Been With a Star" | Grandberry; Hudson; Merritt | Hudson | 3:18 |
| 12. | "What Are We Doing?" | Grandberry; Rufus Moore | Rufus Blaq | 3:53 |

European edition
| No. | Title | Length |
|---|---|---|
| 13. | "Man Up" (featuring Rain) | 3:20 |

Notes

- ^{^[a]} signifies a co-producer

== Personnel ==
Adapted from the 21 liner notes.

- Chris Stokes, Omari Grandberry, Kawan 'KP' Prather, Ketrina 'Taz' Askew, Marques Houston and Henley 'Jr.' Regisford: executive producers
- Brian "Big Bass" Gardner: mastering (Bernie Grundman Mastering, Hollywood, CA)
- Chris "Tek" O'Ryan: sound engineer
- The Ultimate Group: management
- Kenny Meiselas, Esq. (Grubman, Indursky, PC) and Tabetha D. Plummer, Esq. (The Plummer Law Group): legal representation
- Kawan Prather: A&R, Sony Urban Music
- Jennifer Gray: A&R Operations, Sony Urban Music
- David "Touch" Wright: A&R Coordinator, Sony Urban Music
- Amberdawn Alexander: marketing, Sony Urban Music
- Michelle Holme and Erwin Gorostiza: art direction
- Eric Ogden: photography

== Charts ==
=== Weekly charts ===
Weekly chart performance for 21
| Chart (2007) | Peak position |
|---|---|
| Scottish Albums (Official Charts) | 79 |
| UK Albums (Official Charts) | 24 |
| UK R&B Albums (Official Charts) | 2 |
| US Billboard 200 | 1 |
| US Top R&B/Hip-Hop Albums (Billboard) | 1 |

=== Year-end charts ===
Year-end chart performance for 21
| Chart (2007) | Position |
|---|---|
| US Billboard 200 | 147 |
| US Top R&B/Hip-Hop Albums (Billboard) | 46 |

== See also ==
- List of Billboard 200 number-one albums of 2007
- List of Billboard number-one R&B albums of 2007
