= Kevin Michael =

American pop artist

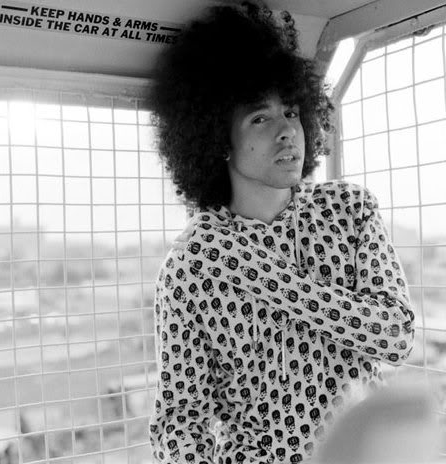
- Michael in 2009

Background information
- Born: Kevin Michael Seward; October 22, 1985 (age 40); Chester, Pennsylvania, United States
- Genres: Pop, R&B
- Occupation: Singer-songwriter
- Years active: 2004–present
- Labels: Atlantic; Downtown
- Website: www.kevinmichael.com

Kevin Michael Seward (born October 22, 1985) is an American singer from Chester, Pennsylvania. He signed with Downtown Records, an imprint of Atlantic Records to release his self-titled debut studio album (2008).

== Early life ==
Born in Chester, Pennsylvania, Michael grew up in a mixed-race family. His father is African-American and his mother is biracial. This had quite an effect on him as a child growing up and would serve as one of his main messages in later musical work. He is a self-taught vocalist with a five octave range. Kevin cites artists like Prince, Michael Jackson and Stevie Wonder as some of his biggest musical influences. At the age of 16 he wrote his first song, and has continued writing his own material throughout the years. Kevin says he loves writing music just as much as singing it.

== Career ==
Michael received attention from Virgin Records and Columbia Records while still a teenager, but ultimately signed with Atlantic Records and their Downtown Records imprint.

His first EP Ya Dig? was featured only on iTunes and the buzz single "We All Want The Same Thing" was highlighted on iTunes Store as the Single of the Week for May 8, 2007. "We All Want The Same Thing" featured rapper Lupe Fiasco and was featured in a Verizon Wireless V CAST Song ID commercial.

Kevin Michael's first official single from his full-length LP was "It Don't Make Any Difference", both produced by and featuring Wyclef Jean. In the song Kevin talks about interracial relationships and the product of being a bi-racial adult himself. A video for the song was shot in Brooklyn, NY in May 2007 directed by video collective Syndrome (James Larese). The video and song was received well by both MTV and VH1 Soul.

Michael's performance was favorably reviewed on day two of the August 2007 Lollapalooza concert in Chicago, describing Kevin as a "young singer with the towering afro and a voice that mixes the soulful side of Michael Jackson with a hip-hop edge." He has also performed at MTV's 2007 Video Music Awards at The Palms Casino Pool in Las Vegas.

The debut album Kevin Michael was released on October 2, 2007. He was on separate tours with Lily Allen, and then Maroon 5 in 2007. In 2008, he toured with John Legend on the Pepsi Smash Tour.

He appeared in the 2009 romantic-comedy (500) Days of Summer as the wedding singer. His cover of Etta James' "At Last" was included on the movie's soundtrack.

On June 10, 2010, Michael resurfaced under the alias KofTHEY (K being the initial for his name, and THEY being a group acronym standing for THE Youth) and released THEY's first single, "Areola" on their YouTube channel, KofTHEY.

On March 14, 2011, Michael opened Twitter and Facebook accounts as KofTHEY.

On March 16, 2011, he released the follow-up album International for a limited release in Japan.

On April 5, 2011, he launched the TeamTHEY website and released two new songs under KofTHEY.

On July 1, 2011, Michael released Covers For You, a nine-song cover album. The album also includes one track from his International album.

In 2019, he published a new single "Sidenixxa".

== In popular culture ==
Song Title	Details
We All Want The Same Thing	Step Up 2: The Streets
We All Want The Same Thing	Prom Night
We All Want The Same Thing	Lincoln Heights (TV series) Season 2: Episode 4
Weekend Jumpoff	Entourage (U.S. TV series) Season 3: Episode 16
Philadelphia	Dance! Online
Stone Cold Killa	Dance! Online
It Don't Make Any Difference	EA Sports: NBA Live 08
Weekend Jumpoff	Just Wright
At Last (Etta James Cover)	(500) Days of Summer

== Discography ==
=== Studio albums ===
Year	Album details	Peak chart positions					Sales
Year	Album details	US	US R&B	US Heat	FRA	SWI	Sales
2007	Kevin Michael: Released: October 2, 2007; Label: Atlantic; Formats: CD, digital download	—	90	24	81	81	
2011	International: Released: March 22, 2011; Label: JVC – Japan; Formats: CD, digital download	—	—	—	—	—	
2011	Covers For You: Released: July 1, 2011; Label: Independent; Formats: digital download	—	—	—	—	—	
2012	LISA: Released: January 20, 2012; Label: Independent; Formats: digital download	—	—	—	—	—	
2013	b r a i n w a $ h: Released: January 21, 2013; Label: Independent; Formats: digital download	—	—	—	—	—	

=== EPs ===
Year	Album details
2007	Ya Dig?: Released: April 10, 2007; Formats: digital download

=== Singles ===
Single	Year	Peak chart positions							Album
Single	Year	US	US R&B	AUT	FIN	GER	SWE	SWI	Album
"We All Want The Same Thing" (featuring Lupe Fiasco)	2007	—	—	—	—	—	—	—	Kevin Michael
"It Don't Make Any Difference To Me (1 Love)" (featuring Wyclef Jean)	2007	—	—	—	17	—	19	—	Kevin Michael
"Ain't Got You"	2008	—	—	64	—	43	—	74	Kevin Michael
"—" denotes releases that did not chart or were not released.

=== Soundtrack appearances ===
Song	Year	Other performer(s)	Film
"We All Want The Same Thing"	2008	Lupe Fiasco	Step Up 2: The Streets
"At Last"	2009	—N/a	(500) Days of Summer
"Weekend Jumpoff"	2010	—N/a	Just Wright
