= Mis-Teeq discography =

- Mis-Teeq in 2026
- Studio albums: 2
- Compilation albums: 1
- Singles: 8
- Music videos: 10
- Other appearances: 10
- Promotional singles: 1

The discography of Mis-Teeq, a British girl group, consists of two studio albums, two compilation albums, eight singles, one video album and one promotional single. Mis-Teeq were formed in 1999 and consist of Alesha Dixon, Sabrina Washington and Su-Elise Nash, although originally Zena McNally was part of the group before departing following the release of their debut single. In February 2005 the group announced they would be splitting to pursue solo careers.

== Albums ==
=== Studio albums ===
List of studio albums, with selected chart positions and certifications
Title	Album details	Peak chart positions							Certifications
Title	Album details	UK	AUS	BEL (FL)	FRA	IRE	NZ	SWI	Certifications
Lickin' on Both Sides	Released: 27 October 2001; Label: Telstar; Formats: CD, cassette	3	152	28	82	—	—	68	BPI: Platinum
Eye Candy	Released: 12 April 2003; Label: Telstar; Formats: CD, cassette	6	100	—	95	48	40	77	BPI: Gold

=== Compilation albums ===
List of compilation albums, with selected chart positions and certifications
Title	Album details	Peak chart positions	
Title	Album details	UK	US
Mis-Teeq	Released: 13 July 2004; Label: Reprise; Formats: CD, cassette	—	125
Mis-Teeq: Greatest Hits	Released: 25 April 2005; Label: Universal; Formats: CD, digital download	28	—

== Singles ==
List of singles, with selected chart positions and certifications, showing year released and album name.
Single	Year	Peak chart positions										Certifications	Album
Single	Year	UK	AUS	BEL (FL)	DEN	FRA	IRE	NL	NZ	SWI	US	Certifications	Album
"Why?"	2001	8	—	—	—	—	—	—	—	—	—	BPI: Silver	Lickin' on Both Sides
"All I Want"	2001	2	31	23	—	—	48	—	—	82	—	BPI: Gold	Lickin' on Both Sides
"One Night Stand"	2001	5	17	47	17	46	12	—	16	24	—	BPI: Silver	Lickin' on Both Sides
"B with Me"	2002	5	19	56	—	—	42	77	—	—	—		Lickin' on Both Sides
"Roll On" / "This Is How We Do It"	2002	7	42	60	—	—	41	25	—	—	—		Lickin' on Both Sides
"Scandalous"	2003	2	9	19	9	27	3	34	4	35	35	BPI: Gold; ARIA: Gold; RMNZ: Gold	Eye Candy
"Can't Get It Back"	2003	8	80	48	—	—	14	—	—	—	—		Eye Candy
"Style"	2003	13	—	—	—	—	38	—	—	—	—		Eye Candy
"—" denotes a single that did not chart or was not released.

=== Soundtracks ===
Year	Title	Film
2001	"Why?"	Goodbye Charlie Bright
2002	"This Is How We Do It"	Ali G Indahouse
2004	"Scandalous"	Catwoman
2005	"Shoo-Shoo Baby"	Valiant

=== Promotional singles ===
Year	Single	Album
2001	"These Days"	Lickin' On Both Sides
2005	"Shoo-Shoo Baby"	Mis-Teeq: Greatest Hits
