= Mis-Teeq: Greatest Hits =

Greatest hits album by Mis-Teeq
- Released: 25 April 2005
- Genre: R&B
- Length: 56:40
- Label: Universal

Mis-Teeq chronology
Mis-Teeq (2004)	Mis-Teeq: Greatest Hits (2005)

Professional ratings
Review scores
Source	Rating
AllMusic	3.5/5 stars

Mis-Teeq: Greatest Hits is a greatest hits compilation album released by Mis-Teeq. The album was released two months after their disbandment in February 2005. The compilation included fourteen songs previously seen on their first two albums, Lickin' on Both Sides and Eye Candy, and one new track, a cover of The Andrews Sisters song "Shoo-Shoo Baby", which was released as the official song of the 2005 Disney film Valiant.

== Track listing ==
No.	Title	Length
1.	"Scandalous" (Stargate Radio Mix) (from Eye Candy)	4:30
2.	"My Song" (from Eye Candy)	4:12
3.	"All I Want" (Sunship Radio Edit) (from Lickin' on Both Sides)	3:28
4.	"All in One Day" (from Eye Candy)	3:50
5.	"Can't Get It Back" (Ignorants Radio Edit) (from Eye Candy)	3:35
6.	"How Does It Feel" (from Eye Candy)	3:48
7.	"Best Friends" (from Eye Candy)	4:37
8.	"Why?" (from Lickin' on Both Sides)	3:20
9.	"Just for You" (from Eye Candy)	3:59
10.	"Style" (from Eye Candy)	3:14
11.	"B with Me" (Mushtaq Radio Edit) (from Lickin' on Both Sides)	4:17
12.	"Home Tonight" (featuring Joe) (from Eye Candy)	3:50
13.	"Roll On" (Blacksmith Rub) (from Lickin' on Both Sides)	3:57
14.	"One Night Stand" (Stargate Radio Edit) (from Lickin' on Both Sides)	3:25
15.	"Shoo-Shoo Baby"	2:38
Total length:		56:40

DVD
No.	Title	Length
1.	"All I Want"
2.	"One Night Stand"
3.	"B With Me"
4.	"Roll On / This Is How We Do It"
5.	"Scandalous"
6.	"Can't Get It Back"
7.	"Style"
8.	"Why?"

== Charts ==
Chart (2005)	Peak position
UK Albums (Official Charts)	28
