= Mis-Teeq (album) =

Compilation album by Mis-Teeq
- Released: 13 July 2004
- Genre: R&B; pop; hip-hop
- Length: 51:24
- Label: Reprise
- Producer: Blacksmith; David Brant; Ed Case; Ignorants; Joe; Dave Kelly; Mushtaq; Salaam Remi; Stargate; Staybent; Sunship

Mis-Teeq chronology
Eye Candy (2003)	Mis-Teeq (2004)	Mis-Teeq: Greatest Hits (2005)

Singles from Mis-Teeq
- 1. "Scandalous" Released: 12 April 2004; 2. "One Night Stand" Released: 23 August 2004

Mis-Teeq is the first compilation album by British girl group Mis-Teeq. It was released by Reprise Records on 13 July 2004 in Canada and in the United States, marking their first and only release in North America. The album contains a selection of songs from the group's two regular previous studio albums, Lickin' on Both Sides (2001) and Eye Candy (2003) as well as new remixes exclusive to this release. Production on Mis-Teeq was helmed by StarGate, Mushtaq, Salaam Remi, Ed Case, Sunship, Dave Kelly, Blacksmith, David Brant and singer Joe.

The album was received well by critics, many of whom praised the strong and lively nature of the productions, particularly on the remixes, and compared Mis-Teeq favorably to other all-female trios such as American bands Destiny's Child and TLC. At the 2005 Soul Train Lady of Soul Awards, it garnered a nomination in the R&B/Soul Album of the Year category. On the US charts, Mis-Teeq reached number 4 on Billboard's Heatseekers Albums. Apart from "Scandalous", Mis-Teeq's first US release, Mis-Teeq spawned the single "One Night Stand", a re-arranged version of their 2001 single.

== Critical reception ==
Professional ratings
Review scores
Source	Rating
AllMusic	3.5/5 stars
Blender	2/5 stars
People	3/4 stars

People found that "part Destiny's Child, part TLC, with a dash of the Spice Girls thrown in for good measure, Britain's Mis-Teeq makes tasty R&B-pop confections on its self-titled US debut [...] Ultimately there is no real mystery to this girl group. They have obvious hooks to match their obvious looks. But make no mis-take: You won't be able to resist them." Allmusic editor David Jeffries wrote that "slick remixes are chosen over lesser album versions, making this a Mis-Teeq mixtape that album owners might want to check. Lyrics are light but lively, swaggering but not standoffish, and maybe a little more risqué and hedonistic than parents would like. Production is where the album really shines. Whenever producers Stargate or Mushtaq are at the controls it's stunning, and when Starship gives "All I Want" the garage treatment you can't help but dance. The bits of garage [...] are overblown in the band's press releases, but the genre's nocturnal-cool bravado is obvious throughout the album and a welcome alternative to the stale thuggish stomps and crunk shouts dominating America." Billboard stated that "Mis-Teeq reveled at Pop, R&B, dancehall, and drum'n'bass-lite."

== Commercial performance ==
Mis-Teeq debuted and peaked at number four on the US Heatseekers Albums.

== Track listing ==
No.	Title	Writer(s)	Producer(s)	Length
1.	"Scandalous" (US Radio Edit)	Alesha Dixon; Hallgeir Rustan; Mikkel Storleer Eriksen; Sabrina Washington; Su-Elise Nash; Tor Erik Hermansen	Stargate	3:59
2.	"One Night Stand" (Stargate Radio Edit)	Dixon; Eriksen; Hermansen; Rustan; Washington; Nash	Stargate	3:24
3.	"Best Friends"	Dixon; Mushtaq Omar Uddin; Washington; Nash	Mushtaq	4:38
4.	"Can't Get It Back" (Ignorants Radio Edit)	Dixon; Aubrey Gravatt; Hernst Bellevue; Joseph Freeman; Marlon Lu'Ree Williams; Salaam Remi; Theodore Life	Remi; Staybent^{[a]}; Ignorants^{[a]}	3:35
5.	"Home Tonight" (featuring Joe)	Dixon; Joe Thomas; Jolyon Skinner; Washington; Nash	Joe	3:51
6.	"Roll On" (Blacksmith Rub)	Joleen Belle; Kowan Paul; Robyn Sykes; Tyrice Jones	Blacksmith	3:59
7.	"All I Want" (Sunship Radio Edit)	Dixon; David Brant; Maryanne Morgan; Alan Glass	Brant; Sunship	3:29
8.	"That's Just Not Me" (featuring Baby Cham)	Dixon; Dameon Beckett; Dave Kelly; Washington; Nash	Kelly	3:52
9.	"How Does It Feel"	Dixon; Mushtaq; Washington; Nash	Mushtaq	3:47
10.	"B with Me"	Dixon; Mushtaq; Washington; Nash	Mushtaq	4:28
11.	"Do Me Like That"	Dixon; Angela Hunte; Washington	Mushtaq	4:21
12.	"Dance Your Cares Away"	Dixon; Edwin Makromallis; Washington; Samantha Powell	Ed Case	3:57
13.	"Can't Get It Back" (Salaam Remi Remix)	Dixon; Gravatt; Bellevue; Freeman; Williams; Remi; Life	Remi; Staybent^{[a]}	4:04
Total length:				51:24

Notes

- ^{^[a]} signifies additional producer

== Charts ==
Chart (2004)	Peak position
Canadian Albums (Nielsen SoundScan)	71
Canadian R&B Albums (Nielsen Soundscan)	17
US Heatseekers Albums (Billboard)	4
