= Eye Candy (album) =

Studio album by Mis-Teeq
- Released: 29 March 2003
- Recorded: 2002–2003
- Genres: UK garage; R&B
- Length: 54:26
- Label: Telstar
- Producers: Delroy "D-Roy" Andrews; Ed Case; Karl "JD" Daniel; Jayson "Loose" Dyer; Joe; Dave Kelly; Mushtaq; Salaam Remi; Rishi Rich; Jolyon Skinner; StarGate; Staybent

Mis-Teeq chronology
Lickin' on Both Sides (2001)	Eye Candy (2003)	Mis-Teeq (2004)

Singles from Eye Candy
- 1. "Scandalous" Released: 17 March 2003; 2. "Can't Get It Back" Released: 30 June 2003; 3. "Style" Released: 17 November 2003

Eye Candy is the second studio album by British girl group Mis-Teeq. It was released by Telstar Records on 29 March 2003 in the United Kingdom. As with their previous album Lickin' on Both Sides (2001), the trio worked with producers StarGate, Ed Case, Mushtaq, and Rishi Rich on the majority of the album, but also consulted new collaborators such as Dave Kelly, Salaam Remi and singer Joe. Musically, Eye Candy took the band's sound further into the contemporary R&B genre, combining pop and soul music with heavy hip hop, garage and reggae elements.

Upon release, the album received generally positive reviews. It debuted and peaked at number six on the UK Albums Chart, selling 33,500 copies first week, and reached number 11 on the Scottish Albums Chart, eventually reaching gold status in the United Kingdom where its sales exceeded 100,000 units in April 2004. Eye Candy produced three singles, including the Blaque cover "Can't Get It Back" and lead single "Scandalous" which became a hit throughout Europe and Oceania and enjoyed success on the US Billboard charts, as well as "Style" which appeared on a reissue of the album. Eye Candy was the final album of Mis-Teeq who disbanded after the demise of their record label Telstar Records in 2005.

== Background ==
Mis-Teeq reteamed with much of the same team that had worked with them on their previous album Lickin' on Both Sides (2001) to produce their second album. When asked about the background of Eye Candy, band member Su-Elise Nash commented: "I would say it's extremely diverse, we worked with a lot of the producers from the first album, like Stargate and also Ed Case to bring that garage flavor back in. And we worked with Dave Kelly who does a lot of the production for all the Shaggy stuff. It's been very successful and this album is a lot more R&B dominated than Lickin' which was more equally balanced with the garage and the R&B. Eye Candy is very much R&B but within that there are so many urban influences, the garage element, hip hop a much greater reggae aspect and an element of bhangra."

== Critical reception ==
Professional ratings
Review scores
Source	Rating
Daily Mail	5/5 stars
entertainment.ie	4/5 stars
The Guardian	4/5 stars
laut.de	3/5 stars
MTV Asia	7/10
Sunday Mirror	9/10

Eye Candy was widely commended for its refined production, compelling hooks, stylistic versatility, and artistic depth. laut.de editor Stefan Johannesberg saw the album as a bold assault on the British R&B scene, with electrifying 2-Step, synth-driven beats, and infectious hooks, especially on "My Song" and "Scandalous," but he noted that some tracks faltered and US producers played a crucial role. entertainment.ie concluded that Eye Candy was a dynamic follow-up blending funky dancefloor grooves, rap, and pop hooks, although it occasionally suffered from lyrical self-indulgence. Writing for MTV Asia, Joe Ng felt that Eye Candy was a polished and assured album, combining high-energy R&B and garage tracks such as "Scandalous," "Can’t Get It Back," and "Dance Your Cares Away" with more restrained, melodic songs like "Strawberrez" and "Best Friends," but implied that the album’s glamour could overshadow its substance.

BBC Music critic Bren O'Callaghan found that "veering between underground and packaged pop, each track on Eye Candy evades definition from one to the next or even partway through [...]" but noted that "it's exactly this type of mix that should stand them in good stead with clubbers and DJs alike," giving the album both mainstream appeal and credible content for dance floor fusions. In his review for The Guardian, Dave Simpson wrote that Eye Candy "documents Mis-Teeq's post-fame rollercoaster with breathless, Hard Day's Night-type detail," showing the tension between glamorous club life and "dawn to dusk in the studio" and brittle personal relationships. He concluded that this candour gives the album depth and humanity, with the ironic title hinting at the contrast between the polished cover image and the group’s musical worth. The Times called Eye Candy an "impressive album," while The Scotsman wrote: "Were it not for the blaring vocal contributions of the fabulous Alesha, whose strident, foghorn reggae toasting supplies Mis-Teeq with about 95 per cent of their edge, Eye Candy would just be another lame example of the Brits copying what the Americans do better."

== Chart performance ==
Eye Candy debuted and peaked at number six on the UK Albums Chart, and reached number 11 on the Scottish Albums Chart. The Official Charts Company ranked it 83rd on the 2003 UK year-end chart. The album was certified silver and gold by the British Phonographic Industry (BPI), indicating sales in excess of 100,000 copies. Eye Candy was the 83rd best-selling album of 2003 in the UK with 215,000 copies sold.

== Track listing ==
Eye Candy – Standard edition
No.	Title	Writer(s)	Producer(s)	Length
1.	"My Song"	Alesha Dixon; Mushtaq Omar Uddin; Sabrina Washington; Su-Elise Nash	Mushtaq	4:45
2.	"Scandalous" (Stargate Radio Mix)	Dixon; Hallgeir Rustan; Mikkel Storleer Eriksen; Washington; Nash; Tor Erik Hermansen	Stargate	3:59
3.	"Can't Get It Back"	Dixon; Aubrey Gravatt; Hernst Bellevue; Joseph Freeman; Marlon Lu'Ree Williams; Salaam Remi; Theodore Life	Remi; Staybent^{[a]}	4:05
4.	"Dance Your Cares Away"	Dixon; Edwin Makromallis; Washington; Samantha Powell	Ed Case	3:48
5.	"All in One Day"	Dixon; Angela Hunte; Washington; Remi; Nash	Remi	3:52
6.	"Strawberrez"	Hunte; Hernst Bellevue; Jayson "Loose" Dyer; Remi	Remi; Staybent; Dyer^{[a]}	5:25
7.	"Nitro"	Dixon; Karl Daniel; Washington; Nash	JD	4:06
8.	"Home Tonight" (featuring Joe)	Dixon; Joe Thomas; Jolyon Skinner; Washington; Nash	Joe	3:53
9.	"That's Just Not Me" (featuring Baby Cham)	Dixon; Dameon Beckett; Dave Kelly; Washington; Nash	Kelly	3:54
10.	"How Does It Feel"	Dixon; Mushtaq; Washington; Nash	Mushtaq	3:48
11.	"Best Friends"	Dixon; Mushtaq; Washington; Nash	Mushtaq	4:41
12.	"It's Beginning to Feel Like Love"	Dixon; Darcy Kahn; Delroy Andrews; Skinner; Washington; Nash	Andrews; Skinner	4:18
13.	"Just for You"	Dixon; Hunte; Rekhi; Washington; Nash	Rishi Rich	4:02
Total length:				54:26

Eye Candy – UK edition
No.	Title	Writer(s)	Producer(s)	Length
9.	"Do Me Like That"	Dixon; Hunte; Washington	Mushtaq	4:21
10.	"That's Just Not Me" (featuring Cham)	Dixon; Beckett; Kelly; Washington; Nash	Kelly	3:54
11.	"How Does It Feel"	Dixon; Mushtaq; Washington; Nash	Mushtaq	3:48
12.	"Best Friends"	Dixon; Mushtaq; Washington; Nash	Mushtaq	4:41
13.	"It's Beginning to Feel Like Love"	Dixon; Darcy Kahn; Delroy Andrews; Skinner; Washington; Nash	Andrews; Skinner	4:18
14.	"Eye Candy"	Dixon; Hunte; Rekhi; Washington; Nash	Rich	2:46
15.	"Just for You"	Dixon; Hunte; Rekhi; Washington; Nash	Rich	4:02
Total length:				61:33

Eye Candy – Japan standard edition bonus tracks
No.	Title	Writer(s)	Producer(s)	Length
16.	"Hey Yo"	Dixon; Hunte; Rekhi; Washington; Nash	Rich	4:12
17.	"Scandalous" (enhanced video)
Total length:				65:45

Eye Candy – Japan special edition bonus tracks
No.	Title	Writer(s)	Producer(s)	Length
16.	"Hey Yo"	Dixon; Hunte; Rekhi; Washington; Nash	Rich	4:12
17.	"Style"	Dixon; Rustan; Eriksen; Hermansen; Chris Lowe; Neil Tennant	Stargate	3:15
Total length:				69:00

Eye Candy – Japan special edition DVD
No.	Title	Length
1.	"All I Want"
2.	"One Night Stand"
3.	"B With Me"
4.	"Roll On/This Is How We Do It"
5.	"Scandalous"
6.	"Can't Get It Back"

Eye Candy – Limited edition reissue
No.	Title	Writer(s)	Producer(s)	Length
1.	"Sumthin' Scandalous" (featuring Redman)	Dixon; Rustan; Eriksen; Washington; Nash; Hermansen	Stargate	3:43
2.	"Style"	Dixon; Rustan; Eriksen; Hermansen; Lowe; Tennant	Stargate	3:15
3.	"Scandalous" (Stargate Radio Mix)	Dixon; Rustan; Eriksen; Washington; Nash; Hermansen	Stargate	3:59
4.	"Can't Get It Back" (Ignorants Radio Edit)	Dixon; Gravatt; Bellevue; Freeman; Williams; Remi; Life	Remi; Staybent^{[a]}; Ignorants^{[a]}	3:35
5.	"My Song"	Dixon; Mushtaq; Washington; Nash	Mushtaq	4:15
6.	"Strawberrez"	Hunte; Bellevue; Dyer; Remi	Remi; Staybent; Dyer^{[a]}	5:25
7.	"Home Tonight" (featuring Joe)	Dixon; Thomas; Skinner; Washington; Nash	Joe	3:53
8.	"Nitro"	Dixon; Daniel; Washington; Nash	JD	4:06
9.	"Dance Your Cares Away"	Dixon; Makromallis; Washington; Powell	Case	3:48
10.	"That's Just Not Me" (featuring Baby Cham)	Dixon; Beckett; Kelly; Washington; Nash	Kelly	3:54
11.	"How Does It Feel"	Dixon; Mushtaq; Washington; Nash	Mushtaq	3:48
12.	"It's Beginning to Feel Like Love"	Dixon; Darcy Kahn; Delroy Andrews; Skinner; Washington; Nash	Andrews; Skinner	4:18
13.	"Hey Yo"	Dixon; Hunte; Rekhi; Washington; Nash	Rich	4:12
14.	"Style" (Linus of Hollywood's Rock Remix)	Dixon; Rustan; Eriksen; Hermansen; Lowe; Tennant	Stargate; Linus of Hollywood^{[a]}	3:29
15.	"Eye Candy"	Dixon; Hunte; Rekhi; Washington; Nash	Rich	2:46
16.	"Just for You"	Dixon; Hunte; Rekhi; Washington; Nash	Rich	4:02
17.	"Best Friends"	Dixon; Mushtaq; Washington; Nash	Mushtaq	4:41
18.	"Do Me Like That"	Dixon; Hunte; Washington	Mushtaq	4:21
19.	"Can't Get It Back"	Dixon; Gravatt; Bellevue; Freeman; Williams; Remi; Life	Remi; Staybent^{[a]}	4:05
20.	"All in One Day"	Dixon; Hunte; Washington; Remi; Nash	Remi	3:52
Total length:				79:27

Notes

- ^{^[a]} signifies a co-producer

== Charts ==
=== Weekly charts ===
Chart (2003)	Peak position
Australian Albums (ARIA)	100
European Albums Chart	27
French Albums (SNEP)	95
Irish Albums (IRMA)	48
New Zealand Albums (RMNZ)	40
Scottish Albums (Official Charts)	11
Swiss Albums (Schweizer Hitparade)	77
UK Albums (Official Charts)	6
UK R&B Albums (Official Charts)	2

=== Year-end charts ===
Chart (2003)	Position
UK Albums (OCC)	83

== Certifications ==
Region	Certification	Certified units/sales
United Kingdom (BPI)	Gold	100,000^{^}
^{^} Shipments figures based on certification alone.
