= Lickin' on Both Sides =

- Second edition has the same cover art with the logo slightly modified with red replacing the green.

Studio album by Mis-Teeq
- Released: 29 October 2001
- Genres: UK garage; R&B
- Length: 52:12
- Label: Telstar
- Producers: Blacksmith; Ed Case; Delirious; Ceri Evans; David Brant; The Full Crew; Michael Graves; Ignorantz; Jensen & Larsson; Mushtaq; Rishi Rich; StarGate; Sunship; Synth; Bump 'n' Flex

Mis-Teeq chronology
Lickin' on Both Sides (2001)	Eye Candy (2003)

Alternative covers
- Special Edition Cover

Singles from Lickin' on Both Sides
- 1. "Why?" Released: 18 September 2000; 2. "All I Want" Released: 11 June 2001; 3. "One Night Stand" Released: 15 October 2001; 4. "B with Me" Released: 18 February 2002; 5. "Roll On" / "This Is How We Do It" Released: 17 June 2002

Lickin' on Both Sides is the debut studio album by British R&B/UK garage group Mis-Teeq, released by Telstar Records on 29 October 2001. It was primarily produced by Stargate, with additional production from Jensen & Larsson, and Synth among others. The album became a top-five success in the United Kingdom, reaching number three on the national albums chart. The album was re-released three times, with the final release, a special edition, being released on 22 June 2002. Lickin' on Both Sides was certified double platinum in the UK. Altogether the album spawned five top-ten singles.

== Background ==
Alesha Dixon and Sabrina Washington met in 1997 at Dance Attic studios in Fulham through Louise Porter, who was assembling a group for her production company, Big Out Ltd. The pair worked with Porter for several years before being joined by Tina Barrett to form a trio that performed singing and dancing engagements. Operating under the name Face2Face, the group remained unsigned, and its members continued to hold employment outside their musical activities. Barrett subsequently departed following a successful audition for Simon Fuller, joining S Club 7. She was replaced by Zena McNally and Su-Elise Nash. The group’s producer, David Brant introduced them, via DJ Darren Stokes of Tin Tin Out, to Inferno Records A&R representative Pat Travers. Travers subsequently signed the group to Telstar Records and oversaw a change of name to Mis-Teeq.

== Singles ==
"Why?" was released as the lead single from Lickin' on Both Sides on 18 September 2000. Serving as the group's debut single, it was later being re-released on 8 January 2001. The original version is a Latin-inflected mid-tempo R&B track. The more known version is a UK garage remix done by Matt "Jam" Lamont and DJ Face. Shortly after the single release, McNally quit the group and the remaining members carried on as a trio.

"All I Want" was released as the album's second single on 11 June 2001. The UK garage track was produced by Sunship and became the group's highest-charting single, at No. 2.

"One Night Stand" was released on 15 October 2001 as the album's third single. It is an R&B song produced by Stargate, also receiving a garage remix by Sunship. The song was later released in the U.S. as the group's second American single in 2004. The group performed the song at the 2002 Brit Awards.

"B with Me" was released as the fourth single on 18 February 2002. For the single release, the song received a garage remix produced by Bump & Flex.

"Roll On" was released as the album's fifth and final single on 17 June 2002. It was released as a double A-single alongside a cover of Montell Jordan's song "This Is How We Do It". The single version of "Roll On" was remixed by Rishi Rich and included on the soundtrack for the film Ali G Indahouse.

== Critical reception ==
Professional ratings
Review scores
Source	Rating
MTV Asia	3/5 stars
The Guardian	4/5 stars
NME	3/5 stars
Yahoo! Music UK	8/10

MTV Asia commended Lickin' On Both Sides for introducing a distinct female presence to the UK garage scene, combining smooth R&B vocals with energetic two-step rhythms and urban production. The review highlighted tracks such as "All I Want," "One Night Stand," "That Type of Girl," "B With Me," and "Nasty" as particularly notable. While the album's attempt at ballads, exemplified by the guitar-driven "These Days," was considered less effective, the overall assessment positioned the group as innovative and stylistically distinctive within the contemporary R&B and garage landscape."

Writing for Yahoo! Music UK, critic Josh Rogan observed that Mis-Teeq successfully blend two-step rhythms with bold vocals and surprisingly gritty lyrical delivery. Although he dismissed the track "These Days" as a significant low point, he praised the rest of Lickin' on Both Sides, calling it a "triumph showing that these three girls aren't so much Destiny's children but UK sisters doing it for themselves." NME Alex Needham found that while the album "demonstrates that their attachment to the UK garage scene is more than skin deep [...] it's when Mis-Teeq start to ape their American peers that their deficiencies become quickly apparent – occasionally thin voices, uninventive MCing and derivative lyrics.

== Commercial performance ==
Lickin' on Both Sides achieved significant commercial success in the United Kingdom and across Europe following its release in 2001. It debuted and peaked at number three on the UK Albums Chart and reached number two on the UK R&B Albums Chart. In Scotland, it attained a peak position of number 24 on the Scottish Albums Chart. On the year-end charts, the album was ranked number 64 on the UK Albums Chart for 2001 and number 90 for 2002, reflecting sustained sales across consecutive years. The album was certified Platinum by the British Phonographic Industry (BPI) in the United Kingdom, denoting shipments of 480,000 copies.

Elsewhere in Europe, the album reached number 20 on the European Albums Chart and performed strongly in several national markets, including a peak of number three in Iceland. It opened at number 28 in the Wallonian region of Belgium, also reaching number 68 in Switzerland, and number 82 in France. In Australia, the album peaked at number 152 on the ARIA Albums Chart.

== Track listing ==
Lickin' on Both Sides – Standard version
No.	Title	Writer(s)	Producer(s)	Length
1.	"One Night Stand" (Stargate radio edit)	Sabrina Washington; Mikkel S. Eriksen; Tor Erik Hermansen; Hallgeir Rustan; Alesha Dixon; Su-Elise Nash	Stargate	3:26
2.	"That Type of Girl"	Dixon; Edwin Makromallis; Samantha Powell	Ed Case	3:36
3.	"Roll On" (Blacksmith rub)	Joleen Belle; Kowan Paul; Robyn Sykes; Tyrice Jones	Blacksmith	3:59
4.	"B with Me"	Dixon; Mushtaq Omar Uddin; Washington; Nash	Mushtaq	4:18
5.	"Why?" (UK garage MC radio edit)	Dixon; David Brant; Maryanne Morgan; Ronald St. Louis; Alan Glass	Brant; Matt "Jam" Lamont^{[a]}; DJ Face^{[a]}	3:23
6.	"They'll Never Know" (featuring Asher D and Harvey)	Washington; Dixon; Nash; Muktari Aminu; Ashley Walters; Michel Harvey	Synth	4:30
7.	"Stamp Reject"	Gary Haase; Theresa Taylor; Jeanette Walker; Trevor "Trell" Henry	Ignorants	4:39
8.	"All I Want" (Sunship radio edit)	Dixon; Brant; Glass; Morgan	Brant; Sunship	3:29
9.	"Nasty"	Washington; Lars Halvor Jensen; Martin Larsson; Dixon	Jensen & Larsson	3:04
10.	"These Days"	Brant; Glass; St. Louis	Stargate	3:17
11.	"Better Better"	Michael Graves; St. Louis; Morgan	Graves	3:23
12.	"Secrets of the Night"	Washington; Nash; Dixon; Jensen; Larsson	Jensen & Larsson	3:34
13.	"You're Gonna Stay"	Washington; Dixon; Nash; Wayne Lawes; Rickardo Reid; Michael Daley	The Full Crew	3:56
Total length:				48:34

Lickin' on Both Sides – UK bonus track
No.	Title	Writer(s)	Producer(s)	Length
14.	"One Night Stand" (Sunship radio edit)	Washington; Eriksen; Hermansen; Rustan; Dixon; Nash	Stargate; Sunship^{[a]}	3:38
Total length:				52:12

Lickin' on Both Sides – Japan bonus tracks
No.	Title	Writer(s)	Producer(s)	Length
14.	"One Night Stand" (Sunship radio edit)	Washington; Eriksen; Hermansen; Rustan; Dixon; Nash	Stargate; Sunship^{[a]}	3:38
15.	"Girl You'll Miss"	Washington; Dixon; Nash		2:57
Total length:				55:09

Lickin' on Both Sides – 2001 limited edition bonus remix disc
No.	Title	Writer(s)	Producer(s)	Length
1.	"One Night Stand" (Agent X dub mix)	Washington; Eriksen; Hermansen; Rustan; Dixon; Nash	Stargate; Agent X^{[a]}	5:47
2.	"One Night Stand" (Dubaholics 4 to Da Floor remix)	Washington; Eriksen; Hermansen; Rustan; Dixon; Nash	Stargate; Dubaholics^{[a]}	6:43
3.	"One Night Stand" (Blacksmith R&B rerub)	Washington; Eriksen; Hermansen; Rustan; Dixon; Nash	Stargate; Blacksmith^{[a]}	5:03
4.	"One Night Stand" (Stargate v. Sunship video edit) (only on 2001 Japan limited edition)	Washington; Eriksen; Hermansen; Rustan; Dixon; Nash	Stargate; Sunship^{[a]}	3:54
5.	"All I Want" (Sunship remix)	Dixon; Brant; Glass; Morgan	Brant; Sunship	5:04
6.	"All I Want" (KL dub mix)	Dixon; Brant; Glass; Morgan	Brant; Sunship; KL^{[a]}	4:30
7.	"All I Want" (Blacksmith R&B re-rub – extended version) (featuring Know ?uestion)	Dixon; Brant; Glass; Morgan; Know ?uestion	Brant; Sunship; Blacksmith^{[a]}	4:46
Total length:				35:47

Lickin' on Both Sides – 2002 special edition
No.	Title	Writer(s)	Producer(s)	Length
1.	"One Night Stand" (Stargate radio edit)	Washington; Eriksen; Hermansen; Rustan; Dixon; Nash	Stargate	3:26
2.	"That Type of Girl"	Dixon; Makromallis; Powell	Case	3:36
3.	"Roll On" (Blacksmith rub)	Belle; Paul; Sykes; Jones	Blacksmith	3:59
4.	"B with Me"	Dixon; Uddin; Washington; Nash	Mushtaq	4:18
5.	"Why?" (UK garage MC radio edit)	Dixon; Brant; Morgan; St. Louis; Glass	Brant; Lamont^{[a]}; DJ Face^{[a]}	3:23
6.	"They'll Never Know" (featuring Asher D and Harvey)	Washington; Dixon; Nash; Aminu; Walters; Harvey	Synth	4:30
7.	"Stamp Reject"	Haase; Taylor; Walker; Henry	Ignorants	4:39
8.	"All I Want" (Sunship radio edit)	Dixon; Brant; Glass; Morgan	Brant; Sunship	3:29
9.	"Nasty"	Washington; Jensen; Larsson; Dixon	Jensen & Larsson	3:04
10.	"These Days"	Brant; Glass; St. Louis	Stargate	3:17
11.	"Better Better"	Graves; St. Louis; Morgan	Graves	3:23
12.	"Secrets of the Night"	Washington; Nash; Dixon; Jensen; Larsson	Jensen & Larsson	3:34
13.	"You're Gonna Stay"	Washington; Dixon; Nash; Lawes; Reid; Daley	The Full Crew	3:56
14.	"One Night Stand" (Sunship radio edit)	Washington; Eriksen; Hermansen; Rustan; Dixon; Nash	Stargate; Sunship^{[a]}	3:38
15.	"B with Me" (Bump & Flex radio edit)	Dixon; Uddin; Washington; Nash	Mushtaq; Bump & Flex^{[a]}	3:38
16.	"Roll On" (Rishi Rich bhangrahop edit)	Belle; Paul; Sykes; Jones; Dixon; Nash; Washington; Rishpal Rekhi	Blacksmith; Rishi Rich^{[a]}	3:47
17.	"This Is How We Do It" (Rishi Rich Mayfair edit)	Montell Jordan; Oji Pierce	Rich; Mushtaq	3:27
Total length:				63:04

Lickin' on Both Sides – 2002 Australian special edition bonus disc
No.	Title	Writer(s)	Producer(s)	Length
1.	"Why?" (Matt "Jam" Lamont & DJ Face classic vox mix)	Dixon; Brant; Morgan; St. Louis; Glass	Brant; Lamont^{[a]}; DJ Face^{[a]}	6:13
2.	"All I Want" (Ignorants remix) (featuring JP Esq)	Dixon; Brant; Glass; Morgan; JP Esq	Brant; Sunship; Ignorants^{[a]}	3:41
3.	"One Night Stand" (Blacksmith R&B rerub)	Washington; Eriksen; Hermansen; Rustan; Dixon; Nash	Stargate; Blacksmith^{[a]}	4:59
4.	"B with Me" (Rishi Rich Olde Skool remix)	Dixon; Uddin; Washington; Nash	Mushtaq; Bump & Flex^{[a]}; Rishi Rich^{[a]}	3:38
5.	"All I Want" (Sunship remix)	Dixon; Brant; Glass; Morgan	Brant; Sunship	5:01
6.	"One Night Stand" (Dubaholics 4 to Da Floor remix)	Washington; Eriksen; Hermansen; Rustan; Dixon; Nash	Stargate; Dubaholics^{[a]}	6:40
7.	"B with Me" (Bump & Flex dub)	Dixon; Uddin; Washington; Nash	Mushtaq; Bump & Flex^{[a]}	5:10
8.	"All I Want" (Blacksmith R&B re-rub) (featuring Know ?uestion)	Dixon; Brant; Glass; Morgan; Know ?uestion	Brant; Sunship; Blacksmith^{[a]}	4:24
9.	"One Night Stand" (Agent X dub mix)	Washington; Eriksen; Hermansen; Rustan; Dixon; Nash	Stargate; Agent X^{[a]}	5:40
Total length:				45:26

Notes

- ^{^[a]} signifies additional producer

== Production ==
- Nicky B. – keyboards
- David Brant of Vybrant Music – keyboards
- Ceri Evans – keyboards
- Lloyd Anthony Gordon – keyboards
- Vocal production: Mushtaq, Peter Trotmann, Sabrina Washington, David Brant, Maryanne Morgan
- Vocal assistance: Ms Dorsett, Elisha Laverne, Maria Wallace, Maryanne Morgan
- Engineer: Jamie Lexton
- Mixing: Marshall & Burbree, Neil Tucker
- Mastering: Dick Beetham
- Design: solarcreative.co.uk
- Photography: Tim Brett-Day
- Production company: Louise Porter at Big out Ltd

== Charts ==
=== Weekly charts ===
Weekly chart performance for Lickin' on Both Sides
Chart (2001)	Peak position
Australian Albums (ARIA)	152
Belgian Albums (Ultratop Wallonia)	28
European Top 100 Albums (Billboard)	20
Icelandic Albums (Tonlist)	3
French Albums (SNEP)	82
Scottish Albums (Official Charts)	24
Swiss Albums (Schweizer Hitparade)	68
UK Albums (Official Charts)	3
UK R&B Albums (Official Charts)	2

=== Year-end charts ===
2001 year-end chart performance for Lickin' on Both Sides
Chart (2001)	Position
UK Albums (OCC)	64

2002 year-end chart performance for Lickin' on Both Sides
Chart (2002)	Position
UK Albums (OCC)	90

== Certifications ==
Certifications for Lickin' on Both Sides
Region	Certification	Certified units/sales
United Kingdom (BPI)	Platinum	480,000

== Release history ==
Release dates and formats for Lickin' on Both Sides
Region	Date	Format(s)	Label(s)	Ref(s).
United Kingdom	29 October 2001	CD	Telstar; Inferno	
Japan	7 November 2001	CD	Telstar	
