= Style (Mis-Teeq song) =

2003 single by Mis-Teeq

Single by Mis-Teeq

from the album Eye Candy
- Released: 17 November 2003
- Length: 3:15
- Label: Telstar
- Songwriters: Alesha Dixon; Mikkel S. Eriksen; Tor Erik Hermansen; Chris Lowe; Hallgeir Rustan; Neil Tennant
- Producer: StarGate

Mis-Teeq singles chronology
"Can't Get It Back" (2003)	"Style" (2003)

Music video
- "Style" on YouTube

"Style" is a song by British girl group Mis-Teeq. It was written by Stargate duo Mikkel Eriksen and Tor Erik Hermansen, along with Hallgeir Rustan, and band member Alesha Dixon for the re-release edition of their second album, Eye Candy (2003). The song contains replayed elements of "West End Girls" (1984) by English synth-pop duo Pet Shop Boys. Due to the inclusion of the sample, Neil Tennant and Chris Lowe are also credited as songwriters.

The track marked the third and final single from Eye Candy and was also one of the last singles released by the group following the breakdown of their record label Telstar Records and the band's subsequent split in 2005. Upon its release, "Style" debuted and peaked at number 13 on the UK Singles Chart, becoming the group's only single not to enter the top 10. "Style" also reached number 18 in Finland, becoming the group's second and most successful single on the Finnish chart.

== Track listings ==
UK CD1
No.	Title	Writer(s)	Producer(s)	Length
1.	"Style" (radio edit)	Alesha Dixon; Mikkel S. Eriksen; Tor Erik Hermansen; Chris Lowe; Hallgeir Rustan; Neil Tennant	Stargate	3:16
2.	"Style" (Linus of Hollywood's Rock mix)	Dixon; Eriksen; Hermansen; Lowe; Rustan; Tennant	Stargate; Linus of Hollywood^{[a]}	3:31

Remix single
No.	Title	Writer(s)	Producer(s)	Length
1.	"Style" (radio edit)	Dixon; Eriksen; Hermansen; Lowe; Rustan; Tennant	Stargate	3:16
2.	"Style" (Delinquent remix)	Dixon; Eriksen; Hermansen; Lowe; Rustan; Tennant	Stargate; Delinquent^{[a]}	5:12
3.	"Style" (Delinquent dub)	Dixon; Eriksen; Hermansen; Lowe; Rustan; Tennant	Stargate; Delinquent^{[a]}	4:42

DVD single
No.	Title	Writer(s)	Producer(s)	Length
1.	"Sumthin' Scandalous" (live from The MOBOs; featuring Redman)	Dixon; Su-Elise Nash; Eriksen; Hermansen; Rustan; Reginald Noble	Stargate	3:36
2.	"Style" (radio edit)	Dixon; Eriksen; Hermansen; Lowe; Rustan; Tennant	Stargate	3:16
3.	"Style" (video)			3:43

Notes

- ^{^[a]} denotes additional producer

Sample credits

- "Style" contains replayed elements of "West End Girls" as performed by Pet Shop Boys.

== Personnel ==
Personnel are adapted from the liner notes of Eye Candy.

- Alesha Dixon – vocals, writing
- Robert "L.B." Dorsey – engineering
- Mikkel S. Eriksen – production, writing
- Tor Erik Hermansen – production, writing
- Su-Elise Nash – vocals
- Lawrence Johnson – additional production
- Chris Lowe – writing (sample)
- Hallgeir Rustan – production, writing
- Neil Tennant – writing (sample)
- Neil Tucker – engineering
- Sabrina Washington – vocals
- Anne Judith Wiik – additional vocals

== Charts ==
Weekly chart performance for "Style"
Chart (2003)	Peak position
Finland (Suomen virallinen lista)	18
Greece (IFPI)	31
Ireland (IRMA)	38
Scottish Singles Sales (Official Charts)	18
UK Singles (Official Charts)	13
UK Airplay (Music Week)	26
UK Hip Hop/R&B (Official Charts)	9

== Release history ==
Release dates and formats for "Style"
Region	Date	Format	Label	Ref(s)
United Kingdom	17 November 2003	CD single; digital download	Telstar	
