= Entice =

Entice and similar may refer to:

- Yamaha Enticer, a 2003 motorcycle manufactured in India (also the name of a 1979 snowmobile)
- N-Tyce, a UK girl group in the late 1990s
- N-Tyce, a rapper with Deadly Venoms

== See also ==
- Seduction
