= B with Me =

2002 single by Mis-Teeq

Single by Mis-Teeq

from the album Lickin' on Both Sides
- Released: 18 February 2002
- Genre: UK garage
- Length: 4:16 (album); 3:39 (Bump & Flex remix)
- Label: Telstar; Inferno
- Songwriters: Alesha Dixon; Su-Elise Nash; Sabrina Washington; Mushtaq
- Producers: Mushtaq; Bump & Flex

Mis-Teeq singles chronology
| "One Night Stand" (2001) | "B with Me" (2002) | "Roll On" / "This Is How We Do It" (2002) |

Music video
- "B with Me" on YouTube

"B with Me" is a song by British girl group Mis-Teeq. It was written by band members Alesha Dixon, Su-Elise Nash, and Sabrina Washington along with Mushtaq for their debut album, Lickin' on Both Sides (2001). Rather than the album version, Grant Nelson's Bump & Flex garage remix of the song was chosen as the fourth single from the album. It reached number five on the UK Singles Chart. The music video features the group dancing on a beach scene, moving into a shack for Dixon's rap.

== Composition ==
"B with Me" is four minutes and 16 seconds. The Bump & Flex remix released as a single runs at three minutes and 39 seconds.

== Track listings ==
UK CD single

1. "B with Me" (Bump & Flex radio edit)
2. "B with Me" (Mushtaq radio edit)
3. "One Night Stand" (Stargate v. Sunship video edit)
4. "B with Me" (Bump & Flex radio edit video)

UK cassette single

1. "B with Me" (Bump & Flex radio edit)
2. "B with Me" (Mushtaq radio edit)
3. "One Night Stand" (Stargate v. Sunship video edit)

Australian CD single

1. "B with Me" (Bump & Flex radio edit)
2. "B with Me" (Mushtaq radio edit)
3. "B with Me" (Rishi Rich Olde Skool mix)
4. "B with Me" (Bump & Flex dub)
5. "One Night Stand" (Stargate v. Sunship video edit)

== Charts ==
=== Weekly charts ===
| Chart (2002) | Peak position |
|---|---|
| Australia (ARIA) | 19 |
| Australian Urban (ARIA) | 9 |
| Belgium (Ultratip Bubbling Under Flanders) | 6 |
| Europe (Eurochart Hot 100) | 39 |
| Ireland (IRMA) | 42 |
| Netherlands (Dutch Top 40 Tipparade) Bump & Flex mix | 10 |
| Netherlands (Single Top 100) | 77 |
| Scotland Singles (OCC) | 16 |
| UK Singles (OCC) | 5 |
| UK Airplay (Music Week) | 14 |

=== Year-end charts ===
| Chart (2002) | Position |
|---|---|
| UK Singles (OCC) | 114 |

== Release history ==
| Region | Date | Format(s) | Label(s) | Ref(s). |
|---|---|---|---|---|
| United Kingdom | 18 February 2002 | CD | Telstar; Inferno | |
| Japan | 6 March 2002 | CD | Victor | |
| Australia | 8 April 2002 | CD | Addiction; Telstar; Inferno | |
