= One Night Stand (Mis-Teeq song) =

2001 single by Mis-Teeq

Single by Mis-Teeq

from the album Lickin' on Both Sides
- Released: 15 October 2001
- Length: 3:25
- Label: Telstar; Inferno
- Songwriters: Sabrina Washington; Mikkel Storleer Eriksen; Tor Erik Hermansen; Alesha Dixon; Su-Elise Nash
- Producer: StarGate

Mis-Teeq singles chronology
"All I Want" (2001)	"One Night Stand" (2001)	"B with Me" (2002)

Music video
- "One Night Stand" on YouTube

"One Night Stand" is a song by British girl group Mis-Teeq, taken from their debut album, Lickin' on Both Sides (2001). The song was released as the third single from the album on 15 October 2001 and reached number five on the UK Singles Chart. In the United States, the song was released as the second single off Mis-Teeq's self-titled US debut album in 2004, after "Scandalous". The US single was commercially released as a maxi-single and as a digital download. Musically, "One Night Stand" is an R&B song with a garage edge.

== Critical reception ==
Siobhan Grogan from NME felt that "One Night Stand" was disappointing, describing it as Mis-Teeq "weakest release so far." She argued that the song represented a technically polished but emotionally uninspired example of UK garage, delivered so mechanically that it seemed scripted. Grogan further suggested that the group failed to convey genuine feeling in the record.

== Commercial performance ==
"One Night Stand" achieved commercial success in several international markets and marked Mis-Teeq's breakthrough outside the United Kingdom, achieving chart placements across multiple international territories. Released as the third single from Lickin' on Both Sides, the song peaked at number five on the UK Singles Chart, becoming the group’s third consecutive top-ten single in the country. Internationally, it reached number 12 in Ireland, number 16 in New Zealand, and number 17 in both Australia and Denmark, while also charting in Flanders, France, and Switzerland. Furthermore, on 18 March 2022, nearly two decades after its release, the single was certified Silver by the British Phonographic Industry (BPI) for achieving more than 200,000 combined sales and streaming units in the United Kingdom.

== Music videos ==
Two music videos were created for the single "One Night Stand". The original UK version, directed by Phil Griffin, took place in a club. The video displayed elaborate colors and clothing of the early 2000s. The music video starts out with Sabrina Washington getting ready and singing acapella to "All I Want", while Su-Elise Nash and Alesha Dixon sit and wait. Nash interrupts Dixon while she is watching the "All I Want" music video to play an advance CD copy of their debut album. The girls are then seen walking out of their hotel and into a cab to the club. After the bridge, the Sunship version of the song is played displaying the garage sound Mis-Teeq became famous for. After the song ends, the girls and their friends return to the hotel room to discuss the dancers they met in the club and listen to the album.

The US version, directed by Jake Nava, features the girls at an underground garage fashion show. Because this song was the follow-up "Scandalous" in the US, a darker, sexier image is shown in the video to match the aesthetic of their debut album in the states. The US video uses the US single mix, which utilizes a slightly different drum beat and additional adlib vocals from Dixon.

== Track listings ==
UK and Australian CD single

1. "One Night Stand" (StarGate radio edit)
2. "One Night Stand" (Sunship radio edit)
3. "Lickin' on Both Sides Album Mix"
4. "One Night Stand" (StarGate radio edit video)

UK cassette single

1. "One Night Stand" (StarGate radio edit)
2. "One Night Stand" (Sunship radio edit)
3. "Lickin' on Both Sides Album Mix"

UK 12-inch single

A1. "One Night Stand" (Sunship radio edit)
B1. "One Night Stand" (Agent X Dubmix)
B2. "One Night Stand" (Dubaholics 4 to da Floor remix)

European CD single

1. "One Night Stand" (StarGate radio edit)
2. "One Night Stand" (Sunship radio edit)

US maxi-CD single

1. "One Night Stand" (single mix) – 3:23
2. "One Night Stand" (Mr. Mig Radio) – 3:40
3. "One Night Stand" (Joe Bermudez & Griffin Missing Boxers mix) – 4:13
4. "One Night Stand" (Eddie Baez vocal club mix) – 7:37
5. "One Night Stand" (L.E.X. vocal club mix) – 8:58
6. "One Night Stand" (X & Early remix) – 7:04
7. "One Night Stand" (Mr. Mig extended club) – 7:52

== Charts ==
=== Weekly charts ===
2001-2002 weekly chart performance for "One Night Stand"
Chart (2001–2002)	Peak position
Australia (ARIA)	17
Australian Urban (ARIA)	5
Belgium (Ultratop 50 Flanders)	47
Belgium (Ultratip Bubbling Under Wallonia)	12
Denmark (Tracklisten)	17
Europe (Eurochart Hot 100)	18
France (SNEP)	46
Germany (GfK)	57
Ireland (IRMA)	12
Netherlands (Dutch Top 40 Tipparade)	7
New Zealand (Recorded Music NZ)	16
Norway (VG-lista)	14
Scotland Singles (Official Charts)	11
Switzerland (Schweizer Hitparade)	24
UK Singles (Official Charts)	5
UK Airplay (Music Week)	5
UK Dance (Official Charts)	2
UK Hip Hop/R&B (Official Charts)	2

2004 weekly chart performance for "One Night Stand"
Chart (2004)	Peak position
US Dance Club Play (Billboard) Remixes	4
US Dance Singles Sales (Billboard) Remixes	8

=== Year-end charts ===
Year-end chart performance for "One Night Stand"
Chart (2001)	Position
UK Singles (OCC)	75

== Certifications ==
Certifications for "One Night Stand"
Region	Certification	Certified units/sales
United Kingdom (BPI)	Silver	200,000^{‡}
^{‡} Sales+streaming figures based on certification alone.

== Release history ==
Release dates and formats for "One Night Stand"
Region	Date	Format(s)	Label(s)	Ref(s).
United Kingdom	15 October 2001	CD	Telstar; Inferno	
Japan	24 October 2001	CD	Victor	
Australia	5 November 2001	CD	Telstar	
United States	13 July 2004	Digital download	Reprise	
United States	23 August 2004	Contemporary hit radio; rhythmic contemporary radio	Reprise	
