= Deep Heat 4 – Play with Fire =

Deep Heat 4 – Play With Fire

Compilation album by Deep Heat
- Released: 1989
- Genre: House
- Label: Telstar Records

Deep Heat chronology
Deep Heat 3 – The Third Degree	Deep Heat 4 – Play With Fire	Deep Heat 89 – Fight the Flame

Professional ratings
Review scores
Source	Rating
Smash Hits	7/10

Deep Heat 4 – Play With Fire is a continuation of Telstar Records Deep Heat compilation series released in September 1989. Containing 32 dance tracks. It continued the series' success, reaching #2 on the Compilations Chart and was awarded a UK Gold Disc for album sales in excess of 100,000 copies. As with the rest of the series, the album features dance music styles of the time including techno, acid house and hip house.

== Track listing ==
Disc One

1. Starlight - "Numero Uno" (4:09)
2. Kaos - "Definition Of Love" (3:39)
3. Sybil - "Don't Make Me Over" (3:40)
4. Virgo - "Do You Know Who You Are?" (3:38)
5. Slique - "Never Give Up" (3:29)
6. Aphrodisiac - "Your Love" (3:58)
7. Joe Smooth - "I'll Be There" (3:42)
8. Kariya - "Let Me Love You for Tonight" (3:52)
9. Raven Maize - "Forever Together" (3:29)
10. Royal House - "Get Funky" (3:51)
11. Bang The Party - "I Feel Good All Over" (3:56)
12. Maurice - "Get Into The Dance" (3:54)
13. T-C - "Hello, I Love You" (3:47)
14. Model 500 - "The Chase" (3:31)
15. Tammy Lucas - "Hey Boy" (3:33)
16. The Beatmasters Featuring Betty Boo - "Hey D.J./I Can't Dance (To That Music You're Playing)" (3:15)

Disc Two

1. Technotronic Featuring Felly - "Pump Up the Jam" (3:35)
2. Chubb Rock with Howie Tee - "Ya Bad Chubbs" (3:34)
3. The DJ Fast Eddie - "Mastermix" (3:43)
4. Frankie Knuckles - "Your Love" (3:38)
5. Melody - "Cool Chillin' " (4:13)
6. ESP - "It's You" (3:55)
7. Out Of The Ordinary - "The Dream" (3:53)
8. De La Soul - "Say No Go" (3:58)
9. Inner City - "Ain't Nobody Better" (3:54)
10. Farley Jackmaster Presents Precious Red - "Think" (3:55)
11. Smokin' Gang Featuring DJ Jack Boy Rapper - "Just Rock" (Rap House Anthem) (3:44)
12. Samurai Sam - "House The Japanese" (3:37)
13. Monie Love - "Grandpa's Party" (3:19)
14. Total Eclipse - "Don't Think About It" (3:56)
15. R-Tyme - "Illusion" (4:02)
16. Mayday - "Sinister" (3:40)
