= Deep Heat 2 – The Second Burn =

Compilation album by Deep Heat
- Released: April 1989
- Genre: House
- Label: Telstar Records

Deep Heat chronology
Deep Heat (1989)	Deep Heat 2 – The Second Burn (1989)	Deep Heat 3 – The Third Degree (1989)

Deep Heat 2 – The Second Burn, the second album in Telstar Records' successful Deep Heat compilation series, was released in April 1989. Containing 28 full length dance tracks, it continued the series' success reaching #2 on the Compilations Chart, and being awarded a UK Gold Disc for album sales in excess of 100,000 copies. As with the rest of the series, the album features numerous styles of dance music of the time including techno, acid house and hip house.

== Track listing ==
Side One

1. Humanoid - "Slam"
2. Tyree - "Hard Core Hip House"
3. The Stop The Violence Movement - "Self-Destruction" (Extended Mix)
4. Rob Base & DJ E-Z Rock - "Get On The Dancefloor"
5. Sterling Void - "Runaway"
6. Yolanda Milla -"When The Pieces Fall" (Todd Terry Mix)
7. Bomb The Bass featuring Maureen - "Say A Little Prayer" (Extended Mix)

Side Two

1. Fast Eddie - "Yoyo Get Funky"
2. Orange Lemon - The Texican (Club Mix)
3. Massive Sounds - "I Want You"
4. Raze - "Let The Music Move U"
5. Royal House - "A Better Way"
6. Keith Nunnally - "Greed"
7. LNR - "Work It To The Bone"
8. Longsy D's House Sound - "This Is Ska" (Skacid Mix)

Side Three

1. Rob Base & DJ E-Z Rock - "It Takes Two"
2. Children Of The Night - "We Play Ska" (Trojan Horse Mix - Edit)
3. Brian Keith - "Touch Me (Love Me Tonight)" (Extended Club Mix)
4. Shana Douglas - "My Love Is Right" (Club Mix)
5. Joe Smooth - "Can't Fake The Feeling"
6. L.U.S.T. - "2 Hot 2 Stop" (Midnight Mix)
7. Rob Base & DJ E-Z Rock - "Get On The Dance Floor" (Extended Mix)

Side Four

1. Yazz - "Dream" (Extended Mix)
2. Turntable Orchestra - "You're Gonna Miss Me" (Hardcore Club Remix)
3. Farley "Jackmaster" Funk & Ricky Dillard - "As Always"
4. Phase II - "Reachin' " (Latin Workout Mix)
5. She Rockers - "On Stage" (Broad Beans Mix)
6. Paris - "Learn To Love" (Extended Mix)
