= Deep Heat =

Deep Heat may refer to:

- Deep Heat (heat rub)
- Deep Heat (compilation album), a 1989 album from Telstar Records, the first in a numbered series with this title
- Deep Heat (Oh Mercy album), 2012
- A form of dielectric heating
