= Eye Candy =

Eye Candy may refer to:

- Beauty or physical attractiveness of a person, object, or depiction
- Eye Candy (album), an album by Mis-Teeq, 2003, or the title track
- Eye Candy (TV series), a 2015 TV show on MTV starring Victoria Justice
- "Eye Candy" (Happy Tree Friends), a web episode in the animated series Happy Tree Friends
- Eye Candy, a band fronted by Shonna Tucker
- "Eye Candy", a 2025 song by Justin Bieber from Swag II
