= Why? (Mis-Teeq song) =

2000 single by Mis-Teeq

Single by Mis-Teeq

from the album Lickin' on Both Sides
- Released: 18 September 2000
- Length: 3:42 (original mix); 3:23 (radio remix)
- Label: Telstar; Inferno
- Songwriters: Alan Glass; David Brant; Maryanne Morgan; Ronald St. Louis
- Producer: David Brant

Mis-Teeq singles chronology
"Why?" (2000)	"All I Want" (2001)

"Why?" is the debut single by British girl group Mis-Teeq. It was written by Alan Glass, David Brant, Ronald St. Louis, and Maryann Morgan and produced by Brant for Vybrant Music. Originally a midtempo R&B track, it was remixed into an uptempo UK garage remix by Matt "Jam" Lamont and DJ Face. It was released as a single in September 2000, later being re-released in January 2001, when it reached number eight on the UK Singles Chart. "Why?" is the only single to feature original member Zena McNally, who left the group to pursue a solo career soon after the single was released.

== Track listing ==
CD single
No.	Title	Producer(s)	Length
1.	"Why?" (UK garage MC radio edit)	David Brant; Matt "Jam" Lamont^{[a]}; DJ Face^{[a]}	3:23
2.	"Why?" (Matt "Jam" Lamont & DJ Face classic vox mix)	Brant; Lamont^{[a]}; DJ Face^{[a]}	6:15
3.	"Why?" (original R'n'B mix)	Brant	3:40

Notes

- ^{^[a]} denotes additional producer

== Personnel ==
Personnel are adapted from the liner notes of Lickin' on Both Sides.

- David Brant – production, writing
- Alesha Dixon – vocals
- DJ Face – remixing
- Alan Glass – writing
- Matt "Jam" Lamont – remixing
- Zena McNally – vocals
- Maryanne Morgan – writing
- Su-Elise Nash – vocals
- Ronald St. Louis – writing
- Sabrina Washington – vocals

== Charts ==
=== Weekly charts ===
Chart (2001)	Peak position
Europe (Eurochart Hot 100)	40
Scotland Singles (Official Charts)	35
UK Singles (Official Charts)	8
UK Airplay (Music Week)	20
UK Dance (Official Charts)	2
UK Indie (Official Charts)	2
UK Hip Hop/R&B (Official Charts)	2

=== Year-end charts ===
Chart (2001)	Position
UK Singles (OCC)	152

== Release history ==
"Why?" release history
Region	Date	Format	Label	Ref
United Kingdom	18 September 2000	12-inch vinyl; CD single	Telstar; Inferno	
United Kingdom	8 January 2001	CD single	Telstar; Inferno	
