= All I Want (Mis-Teeq song) =

2001 song by Mis-Teeq

Single by Mis-Teeq

from the album Lickin' on Both Sides
- Released: 11 June 2001
- Genre: UK garage; R&B
- Length: 3:28
- Label: Telstar; Inferno
- Songwriters: Sabrina Washington; Alan Glass; David Brant; Maryann Morgan; Alesha Dixon
- Producers: David Brant; Sunship

Mis-Teeq singles chronology
"Why?" (2000)	"All I Want" (2001)	"One Night Stand" (2001)

Music video
- "All I Want" on YouTube

"All I Want" is a song by British girl group Mis-Teeq. It was written by Alesha Dixon, Sabrina Washington, David Brant, Alan Glass and Maryann Morgan and originally produced by David Brant (Vybrant Music). A UK garage remix by Ceri "Sunship" Evans was produced for their 2001 debut album Lickin' on Both Sides, and was released as a single, reaching No. 2 on the UK Singles Chart in 2001. It is their joint-biggest hit, along with "Scandalous" (2003).

== Music video ==
The opening shows Su-Elise Nash trying out outfits in her bedroom with Alesha Dixon and Sabrina Washington, before all three girls get sucked into Nash's mirror. Once inside they sing and perform a dance routine before a white and gold backdrop. After Dixon's rap, the video breaks down into the Ignorants remix version of the song, the white and gold being replaced by pink, purple and blue. When the remix concludes, the video switches back to the Sunship radio mix. The video finishes in Nash's bedroom, revealed to be a daydream Nash experienced.

== Track listings ==
UK CD and cassette single
No.	Title	Producer(s)	Length
1.	"All I Want" (Sunship radio edit)	Sunship; David Brant^{[a]}; Pete Trotman^{[b]}	3:23
2.	"All I Want" (Ignorants remix featuring JP Esq)	Sunship; Brant^{[a]}; Trotman^{[b]}; Ignorants^{[c]}	6:15
3.	"All I Want" (Blacksmith R&B re-rub featuring Know ?uestion)	Sunship; Brant^{[a]}; Trotman^{[b]}; Blacksmith^{[c]}	3:40

UK 12-inch single
No.	Title	Producer(s)	Length
1.	"All I Want" (Sunship radio edit)	Sunship; Brant^{[a]}; Trotman^{[b]}	3:23
2.	"All I Want" (Blacksmith R&B re-rub featuring Know ?uestion extended version)	Sunship; Brant^{[a]}; Trotman^{[b]}; Ignorants^{[c]}	6:15
3.	"All I Want" (KL dub mix)	Sunship; Brant^{[a]}; Trotman^{[b]}; KL^{[c]}	4:28

European CD single
No.	Title	Producer(s)	Length
1.	"All I Want" (Sunship radio edit)	Sunship; Brant^{[a]}; Trotman^{[b]}	3:23
2.	"All I Want" (Ignorants remix featuring JP Esq)	Sunship; Brant^{[a]}; Trotman^{[b]}; Ignorants^{[c]}	6:15

European maxi-CD single
No.	Title	Producer(s)	Length
1.	"All I Want" (Sunship radio edit)	Sunship; Brant^{[a]}; Trotman^{[b]}	3:23
2.	"All I Want" (Ignorants remix featuring JP Esq)	Sunship; Brant^{[a]}; Trotman^{[b]}; Ignorants^{[c]}	6:15
3.	"All I Want" (Blacksmith R&B re-rub featuring Know ?uestion)	Sunship; Brant^{[a]}; Trotman^{[b]}; Blacksmith^{[c]}	3:40
4.	"All I Want" (Miami Bass 12-inch club mix)	Sunship; Brant^{[a]}; Trotman^{[b]}; Blacksmith^{[c]}	4:30

Australian CD single
No.	Title	Producer(s)	Length
1.	"All I Want" (Sunship radio edit)	Sunship; Brant^{[a]}; Trotman^{[b]}	3:23
2.	"All I Want" (Ignorants remix featuring JP Esq)	Sunship; Brant^{[a]}; Trotman^{[b]}; Ignorants^{[c]}	6:15
3.	"All I Want" (Blacksmith R&B re-rub featuring Know ?uestion)	Sunship; Brant^{[a]}; Trotman^{[b]}; Blacksmith^{[c]}	3:40
4.	"All I Want" (Sunship remix)	Sunship; Brant^{[a]}; Trotman^{[b]}	5:02
5.	"All I Want" (KL dub mix)	Sunship; Brant^{[a]}; Trotman^{[b]}; KL^{[c]}	4:28

Notes

- ^{^[a]} denotes first producer
- ^{^[b]} denotes additional vocal producer
- ^{^[c]} denotes additional producer

== Charts ==
=== Weekly charts ===
Chart (2001)	Peak position
Australia (ARIA)	31
Australian Urban (ARIA)	9
Belgium (Ultratop 50 Flanders)	23
Europe (Eurochart Hot 100)	15
Ireland (IRMA)	48
Scottish Singles Sales (Official Charts)	23
Switzerland (Schweizer Hitparade)	82
UK Singles (Official Charts)	2
UK Airplay (Music Week)	6
UK Dance (Official Charts)	2
UK Hip Hop/R&B (Official Charts)	2

=== Year-end charts ===
Chart (2001)	Position
UK Singles (OCC)	63
UK Urban (Music Week)	20

== Certifications ==
Region	Certification	Certified units/sales
United Kingdom (BPI)	Gold	400,000^{‡}
^{‡} Sales+streaming figures based on certification alone.

== Release history ==
Region	Date	Format	Label	Ref
United Kingdom	11 June 2001	CD	Telstar	
Australia	30 July 2001	CD	Telstar	
