= Roll On (Mis-Teeq song) =

2002 single by Mis-Teeq

Single by Mis-Teeq

from the album Lickin' on Both Sides
- A-side: "This Is How We Do It"
- Released: 17 June 2002
- Genre: R&B; pop
- Length: 3:47
- Label: Telstar; Inferno
- Songwriters: Joleen Belle; Tyrice Jones; Kowan Paul; Robyn Sykes
- Producer: Blacksmith

Mis-Teeq singles chronology
"B with Me" (2002)	"Roll On" / "This Is How We Do It" (2002)	"Scandalous" (2003)

Music video
- "Roll On" / "This Is How We Do It" on YouTube

"Roll On" is a song by British girl group Mis-Teeq. It was written by Joleen Belle, Tyrice Jones, Kowan Paul, and Robyn Sykes and recorded for the group's debut album, Lickin' on Both Sides (2001), while production was helmed by Blacksmith. The song was released as a double A-single along with a cover version of Montell Jordan's "This Is How We Do It" on 17 June 2002, marking the album's final single. Upon its release, it became another top-10 success for the group on the UK Singles Chart, peaking at number seven.

== Music video ==
Instead of filming two separate music videos for the double A-side single, one music video was filmed combining both songs. The video opens with "Roll On", starting with a group of men playing basketball in a court. Mis-Teeq members Alesha Dixon, Su-Elise Nash and Sabrina Washington arrive in a lowrider and watch the men play basketball, and occasionally join in. Then it changes to dusk and cuts to the single "This Is How We Do It". The music video was filmed in various parts of Los Angeles, California in the US.

== Track listings ==
UK CD single

1. "Roll On" (Rishi Rich BhangraHop edit)
2. "This Is How We Do It" (Rishi Rich Mayfair edit)
3. "Roll On" / "This Is How We Do It" (video)

UK cassette single

1. "Roll On" (Rishi Rich BhangraHop edit)
2. "This Is How We Do It" (Rishi Rich Mayfair edit)
3. "Roll On" (Rishi Rich radio mix)

European CD single

1. "Roll On" (Rishi Rich BhangraHop edit) – 3:45
2. "This Is How We Do It" (Rishi Rich Mayfair edit) – 3:27

Australian CD single

1. "Roll On" (Rishi Rich radio mix)
2. "This Is How We Do It" (Rishi Rich Mayfair edit)
3. "Roll On" (Blacksmith Olde Skool mix)
4. "This Is How We Do It" (Mayfair club rub)
5. "Roll On" (Rishi Rich club mix)

== Charts ==
All entries charted with "This Is How We Do It" except where noted.

=== Weekly charts ===
Weekly chart performance for "Roll On"
Chart (2002)	Peak position
Australia (ARIA)	42
Australian Urban (ARIA)	13
Belgium (Ultratip Bubbling Under Flanders) "Roll On" only	10
Europe (Eurochart Hot 100)	34
Germany (GfK)	100
Hungary (Single Top 40) "Roll On" only	15
Ireland (IRMA)	41
Netherlands (Dutch Top 40) "Roll On" only	31
Netherlands (Single Top 100)	25
Scottish Singles Sales (Official Charts)	19
UK Singles (Official Charts)	7
UK Airplay (Music Week)	7

=== Year-end charts ===
Year-end chart performance for "Roll On"
Chart (2002)	Position
UK Singles (OCC)	135

== Release history ==
Release history and formats for "Roll On"
Region	Date	Format(s)	Label(s)	Ref.
United Kingdom	17 June 2002	CD	Telstar; Inferno	
Japan	24 July 2002	CD	Victor	
