= Deep Heat 3 – The Third Degree =

Compilation album by Deep Heat
- Released: 1989
- Genre: House
- Label: Telstar Records

Deep Heat chronology
| Deep Heat 2 – The Second Burn | Deep Heat 3 – The Third Degree | Deep Heat 4 – Play with Fire |

Deep Heat 3 – The Third Degree, a continuation of Telstar Records' Deep Heat compilation series was released 7 August 1989. Containing 28 full length dance tracks, it continued the series' success, reaching #2 on the Compilations Chart and being awarded a UK Gold Disc for album sales in excess of 100,000 copies. As with the rest of the series, the album features dance music styles of the time including techno, acid house and hip house.

== Track listing ==
Disc One

1. Cappella - "Helyom Helib (Part One)" (3:45)
2. Double Trouble and the Rebel MC - "Just Keep Rockin'" (Sk'ouse Mix) (3:56)
3. Coldcut featuring Lisa Stansfield - "People Hold On" (5:15)
4. Kechia Jenkins - "Still Waiting" (Fly Guy Mix) (4:55)
5. Donna Allen - "Joy and Pain" (Edited Dance Version) (3:53)
6. Toni Scott - "That's How I'm Living" (3:44)
7. Inner City - "Good Life" (Magic Juan Mix) (6:15)
8. De La Soul - "Me Myself And I" (4:59)
9. Black, Rock & Ron - "Stop The World" (4:33)
10. A Guy Called Gerald - "Voodoo Ray" (4:11)
11. Sweet Tee - "Let's Dance" (Hip House Mix) (3:57)
12. Today's People - "Set Your Body Free" (5:46)
13. Velma Wright - "You're Not Right" (12" Mix) (4:09)
14. Kelvin Pizarro - "Loneliness" (Deep House Remix) (4:45)

Disc Two

1. Lake Eerie - "Sex 4 Daze (I Want It, You Can Get It)" (Freestyle Club Mix) (5:08)
2. Razette Featuring Lamya - "Ready 4 Love" (French Tickler Mix) (5:50)
3. Voodoo Doll - "Women Beat Their Men" (4:58)
4. Rob Base and DJ E-Z Rock - "Joy & Pain" (World To World Remix) (4:08)
5. Deluxe - "(I've Got A) Feeling" (5:17)
6. Jo Ann Jones - "Share My Joy" (2:55)
7. On The House Featuring Curtis McClain - "Pleasure Control" (4:16)
8. Arnold Jarvis - "Take Some Time Out" (Rugged Riddim Mix) (4:47)
9. Kelly Charles - "You're The One" (Remix) (4:58)
10. Maureen - "Don't Fight The Music" (12" Vocal Club Mix) (4:14)
11. Lisa M - "Rock To The Beat" (3:29)
12. Kevin 'Reese' Saunderson - "You're Mine" (5:21)
13. T CUT F Featuring Glenys Russell - Searching (4:55)
14. Rhythim Is Rhythim - Beyond The Dance (4:58)
