= This Is How We Do It =

1995 single by Montell Jordan

Single by Montell Jordan

from the album This Is How We Do It
- Released: February 5, 1995
- Genre: New jack swing; hip-hop soul; R&B
- Length: 4:37 (album version); 3:59 (radio edit); 3:39 (without rap)
- Label: Rush Associated Labels; PMP; Def Jam
- Songwriters: Montell Jordan; Oji Pierce; Ricky Walters
- Producers: Montell Jordan; Oji Pierce

Montell Jordan singles chronology
"This Is How We Do It" (1995)	"Somethin' 4 da Honeyz" (1995)

Music video
- "This Is How We Do It" on YouTube

"This Is How We Do It" is the debut single of American singer-songwriter Montell Jordan. It was released by Def Jam Recordings in February 1995, as the lead single from his debut studio album of the same name (1995). The single was Def Jam's first R&B release, and is Jordan's signature song.

The song is a tribute to South Central Los Angeles party culture in the hip hop soul style popular at the time. It features Jordan singing over an enhanced Teddy Riley drumbeat sample of Slick Rick's "Children's Story" which in turn has an added interpolation of the bass of Bob James' "Nautilus". "This Is How We Do It" peaked at number one on the US Billboard Hot 100 on April 15, 1995, rising from number six the previous week and displacing Madonna's "Take a Bow" from the top spot. It remained at number one for seven consecutive weeks. It was also number one for seven weeks on the R&B singles chart. The single sold one million copies domestically and received platinum certification from the Recording Industry Association of America (RIAA). The accompanying music video for "This Is How We Do It" was directed by Hype Williams.

The song earned Jordan a Grammy Award nomination for Best Male R&B Vocal Performance at the 38th Annual Grammy Awards. The same year, the song was named Best R&B 12-inch at the International Dance Music Awards in Miami.

== Critical reception ==
Chuck Campbell from Knoxville News Sentinel found that the track "combines enough elements to make for an unavoidable crossover hit, as Jordan's lilting voice meshes with "phat" beats, an incessant title refrain and a sample of rapper Slick Rick's 'Children's Story'." Connie Johnson from Los Angeles Times felt the American R&B crooner and songwriter "has a youthful bravado", describing the song as "hard-slammin'". Simon Price from Melody Maker viewed it as "Bobby Brown grooves with Snoop Dogg rhymes". Another Melody Maker editor, David Stubbs, noted its "auto-pilot, fast-buck, anthemic swingbeat with the usual ring-a-ring-a-roses singalong chant and laboured partytime chorus." Dele Fadele from NME praised it as "anthemic, defiant, and catchy".

Ralph Tee from Music Week's RM Dance Update wrote, "This record is typical of everything that urban contemporary soul is about with its chugging swing/funk rhythms and intense Aaron Hall-style vocal and it's been flying out on import lately. Its main appeal is the infectious multi-vocal chorus, blasting out the song's title to ram home its anthemic qualities." He remarked that "there's masses of dancefloor appeal". Another RM editor, James Hamilton, described it as a "soulfully whined, chanted and rapped rolling jackswing joller" in his weekly Dance column. Mark Frith from Smash Hits gave 'This Is How We Do It' four out of five, adding, "He is Montell Jordan, and he's a very clever bloke, who's made a record that combines the best of gangsta rap with a fantastic classic soul voice." He concluded that "this is a very likely cross-over hit here [in the UK] too."

== Music video ==
The music video for "This Is How We Do It" was directed by American music video and film director Hype Williams. The video opens at a house party with people mingling. Jordan sings and dances at the party, with back dancers on a sound stage, and later sitting in a booth with a woman. It was nominated for two awards at the 1995 MTV Video Music Awards, in the categories for Best Dance Video and Best R&B Video, and nominated for Best New Artist Clip in the category for R&B/Urban at the 1995 Billboard Music Video Awards. Remastered in HD, the video has generated more than 194 million views on YouTube as of February 2025.

== Impact and legacy ==
British music newspaper NME ranked "This Is How We Do It" number 12 in their list of the Top 20 of 1995 in December 1995. In 1996, the song earned Jordan a Grammy Award nomination for Best Male R&B Vocal Performance at the 38th Annual Grammy Awards. The same year, the song was named Best R&B 12-inch at the International Dance Music Awards in Miami. German magazine Spex included "This Is How We Do It" in their "The Best Singles of the Century" list in 1999.

== Track listing ==
- CD single, Europe (1995)
1. "This Is How We Do It" (LP Version) — 3:59
2. "This Is How We Do It" (LP Instrumental) — 3:44
3. "I Wanna" (LP Version) — 5:25
4. "This Is How We Do It" (Acappella) — 3:47
- CD single, UK (1995)
1. "This Is How We Do It" (Radio Mix) — 3:43
2. "This Is How We Do It" (Tee's Radio Mix) — 3:46
3. "This Is How We Do It" (Tee's Club Mix) — 5:19
4. "This Is How We Do It" (Barr 9 Mix) — 4:05
5. "This Is How We Do It" (Tee's Dub Mix) — 4:51
6. "This Is How We Do It" (Wino Mix) — 3:58

== Charts ==
=== Weekly charts ===
Chart (1995)	Peak position
Australia (ARIA)	7
Belgium (Ultratop 50 Flanders)	38
Belgium (Ultratop 50 Wallonia)	26
Canada Retail Singles (The Record)	1
Canada Top Singles (RPM)	8
Canada Dance/Urban (RPM)	1
Europe (Eurochart Hot 100)	19
Europe (European Dance Radio)	3
Europe (European Hit Radio)	26
France (SNEP)	34
Germany (GfK)	38
Israel (Israeli Singles Chart)	3
Netherlands (Dutch Top 40)	11
Netherlands (Single Top 100)	11
New Zealand (Recorded Music NZ)	5
Scottish Singles Sales (Official Charts)	46
Sweden (Sverigetopplistan)	22
Switzerland (Schweizer Hitparade)	38
UK Singles (Official Charts)	11
UK Dance (Official Charts)	6
UK Hip Hop/R&B (Official Charts)	1
UK Club Chart (Music Week)	29
UK Pop Tip Club Chart (Music Week)	28
US Billboard Hot 100	1
US Hot R&B/Hip-Hop Songs (Billboard)	1
US Maxi-Singles Sales (Billboard)	2
US Pop Airplay (Billboard)	11
US Rhythmic Airplay (Billboard)	1
US Cash Box Top 100	2
Zimbabwe (ZIMA)	1

=== Year-end charts ===
Chart (1995)	Position
Australia (ARIA)	59
Brazil (Crowley)	23
Canada Top Singles (RPM)	89
Canada Dance/Urban (RPM)	15
Netherlands (Dutch Top 40)	82
New Zealand (RIANZ)	20
US Billboard Hot 100	10
US Hot R&B Singles (Billboard)	2
US Maxi-Singles Sales (Billboard)	7
US Top 40/Rhythm-Crossover (Billboard)	3
US Cash Box Top 100	9

=== Decade-end charts ===
Chart (1990–1999)	Position
Canada (Nielsen SoundScan)	69
US Billboard Hot 100	29

== Certifications ==
Region	Certification	Certified units/sales
New Zealand (RMNZ)	2× Platinum	60,000^{‡}
United Kingdom (BPI)	Platinum	600,000^{‡}
United States (RIAA)	5× Platinum	5,000,000^{‡}
^{‡} Sales+streaming figures based on certification alone.

== Release history ==
Region	Date	Format(s)	Label(s)	Ref.
United States	February 5, 1995	—N/a	Rush Associated Labels; PMP	
Japan	April 26, 1995	CD	Rush Associated Labels	
United Kingdom	May 1, 1995	12-inch vinyl; CD; cassette	Def Jam; Island	
Australia	May 8, 1995	CD; cassette	Rush Associated Labels; PMP; Mercury	

== Mis-Teeq version ==
"This Is How We Do It"

Single by Mis-Teeq

from the album Lickin' on Both Sides
- A-side: "Roll On"
- Released: June 17, 2002
- Genre: R&B; pop
- Length: 3:47
- Label: Telstar; Inferno
- Songwriters: Montell Jordan; Oji Pierce
- Producers: Rishi Rich; Mushtaq

Mis-Teeq singles chronology
"B with Me" (2002)	"Roll On" / "This Is How We Do It" (2002)	"Scandalous" (2003)

Music video
- "Roll On" / "This Is How We Do It" on YouTube

In 2002, British girl group Mis-Teeq released their version as a double A-side with "Roll On". It peaked at number seven on the UK Singles Chart, faring four places higher than the original there. The recording by Jordan was featured in the 2002 film Ali G Indahouse alongside the Rishi Rich mix of Mis-Teeq's version. The Rishi Rich remix of "This Is How We Do It" is included on the film's soundtrack. "This Is How We Do It" is included on the special edition of the album Lickin' on Both Sides.

=== Charts ===
Chart (2002) (Note: "This Is How We Do It" charted as a double A-side single with "Roll On")	Peak position
Australia (ARIA)	42
Australian Urban (ARIA)	13
Europe (Eurochart Hot 100)	34
Germany (GfK)	100
Ireland (IRMA)	41
Netherlands (Single Top 100)	25
Scottish Singles Sales (Official Charts)	19
UK Singles (Official Charts)	7

== "The Party (This Is How We Do It)" ==
"The Party (This Is How We Do It)"

Single by Joe Stone featuring Montell Jordan
- Released: May 15, 2015
- Recorded: 2015
- Genre: House
- Length: 3:04
- Label: Spinnin'
- Songwriter: Montell Jordan

Joe Stone singles chronology
"The Party (This Is How We Do It)" (2015)	"Until the Morning (Joe Stone Remix)" (2015)

Dutch DJ Joe Stone released a remixed version of the song in 2015 with Jordan credited as the featured artist.

=== Formats and track listings ===
No.	Title	Length
1.	"The Party (This Is How We Do It) (Original Mix)" (featuring Montell Jordan)	4:44
2.	"The Party (This Is How We Do It) (Radio Edit)" (featuring Montell Jordan)	3:04

=== Charts ===
Chart (2015)	Peak position
Ireland (IRMA)	65
Scottish Singles Sales (Official Charts)	9
UK Dance (Official Charts)	9
UK Singles (Official Charts)	17
US Dance Club Songs (Billboard)	14

=== Release history ===
Country	Date	Format	Label
Ireland	July 31, 2015	Digital download	Spinnin'
United Kingdom	July 31, 2015	Digital download	Spinnin'

== See also ==
- List of Billboard Hot 100 number-one singles of 1995
- List of number-one R&B singles of 1995 (U.S.)
