= Grant Nelson (DJ) =

English DJ (born 1971)

- Also known as: Wishdokta
- Born: April 1971 (age 54); London, England
- Origin: London, England
- Genres: UK garage; house; drum and bass; breakbeat hardcore; happy hardcore
- Years active: 1986–present
- Labels: Swing City Records; Nice 'N' Ripe

Grant Nelson (born April 1971), also known as Wishdokta, Bump & Flex and N'n'G, is an English DJ, remixer and record producer.

== Biography ==
In the 1990s, inspired by producers such as Masters at Work, MK and Eddie Perez, he played an important role in the development of the UK garage genre, being heralded as the "Godfather of UK Garage".

In 2013, Nelson appeared alongside many other garage pioneers in a documentary exploring the legacy of UK garage, Rewind 4Ever: The History of UK Garage.

Hit singles on the UK charts as Bump & Flex include "Long Time Coming" (UK #73, UK Dance #3) and "Got Myself Together" (UK #84, UK Dance #3), and as one half of N'n'G, he scored a No. 12 and No. 1 Dance hit with "Right Before My Eyes" in 2000.

Popular Bump & Flex remixes include Mis-Teeq's "B with Me" (UK #5), James Brown's "Funk on Ah Roll" (UK #40, UK Dance #1), Indo's "R U Sleeping" (UK #31, UK Dance #3) and the Steppers Dub of Nelson's "Step 2 Me" (featuring Jean McClain; UK #92, UK Dance #7).
