= Yamaha Enticer =

Entry-level cruiser motorcycle

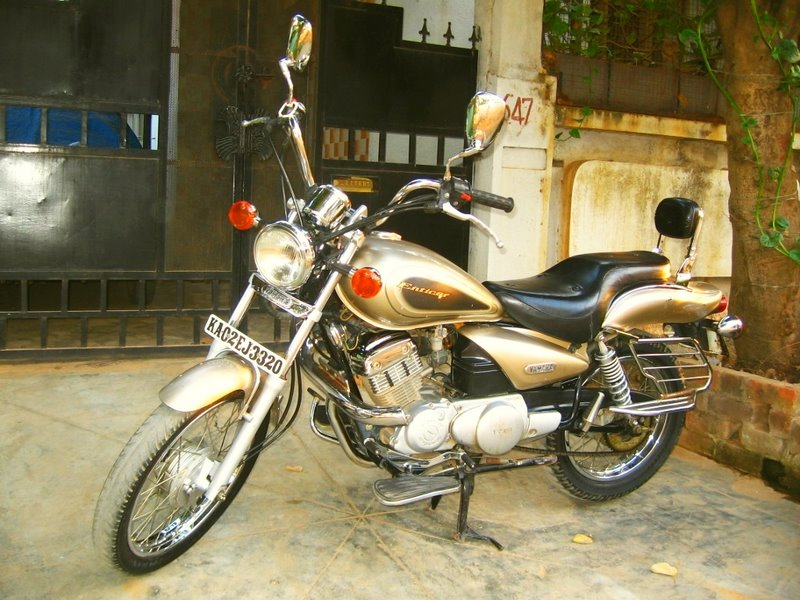
- Yamaha Enticer
- Manufacturer: India Yamaha Motor
- Parent company: Yamaha Motor Company
- Production: 2002–2006 (discontinued)
- Class: Cruiser
- Engine: 123.7 cc. Air-cooled four-stroke single-cylinder
- Power: 11 bhp
- Torque: 1.06 KgM
- Transmission: 4-speed
- Tires: 120/80
- Wheelbase: 1,375 mm (54.1 in)
- Dimensions: L: 1,995 mm (78.5 in); W: 670 mm (26 in)
- Seat height: 790 mm (31 in)
- Weight: 116 kg (256 lb) (dry); 125 kg (276 lb) (wet)
- Fuel capacity: 13 L (2.9 imp gal; 3.4 US gal)
- Ground clearance: 140 mm (5.5 in)

The Yamaha Enticer is an entry-level cruiser motorcycle that was produced from 2002 to 2006 in India. It is no longer in production. It featured a feet-forward cruiser-type riding position and was available in two trim levels, the regular and the delux. The delux variant had a self-starter and disk brakes for the front wheel.

== Technical description ==
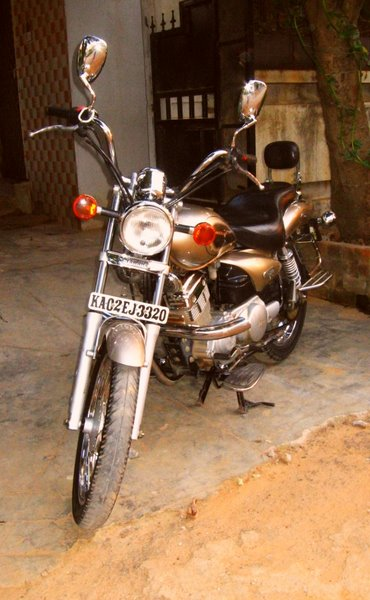
Raised handlebar and chrome plated pod type mirrors ('V' grip Zapper tyres)

The Yamaha Enticer YBA-125 had a raised handlebar, a long wheelbase, easy rider seating geometry, foot boards instead of foot pegs, a fat rear tyre, and a single pod instrument cluster. The motorcycle was available in four colour variants: Gold (light yellow), Burgundy (reddish), Black and Lavender-Silver (exclusive to the delux variant).

The motive power comes from the 54 mm × 54 mm, 123.7 cc square engine that it shares with the Yamaha YBX motorcycle. While the maximum torque of 1.06 KgM at 6500 rpm is identical to that of YBX, the 11 bhp (PS) of power in the Enticer engine comes at a slower 8000 rpm, while in the YBX it comes at a higher 8500 rpm. The compression ratio of the Enticer is 10:1. Maximum speed can reach 120 kph. The wheelbase is 1,375 mm, with a claimed ground clearance of 140 mm. Kerb weight (with oil and a full petrol tank) is 125 kg, while dry weight is 116 kg. The fuel tank capacity is 13 liters, with a reserve of 2.4 liters. The VM20SS, Ucal / Mikuni carburetor breathes through a wet-type air cleaner. Fuel is ignited by an NGK Spark Plug, model CR7HSA with an ideal plug gap of 0.65 mm. The ignition is CDI.

Electricity is produced by a 12 volt flywheel magneto with a 12 volt, 2.5 Ah lead–acid battery. The headlight power is 12v–35w. The front tyre is a 4-ply rating 2.75 × 18 (Zapper FS pattern), while at the rear is a 6-ply rating 120/80 × 16 (Zapper Y pattern).

The engine oil specified is Yamalube 4-stroke motor oil (20W40 type SF) or equivalent. Yamaha also warns not to use oils that contain anti-friction modifiers or car oils (often referred to as energy-conserving oils) that contain anti-friction additives, since this will cause clutch slippage and will in turn reduce the life of components and cause a drop in engine performance. While the total quantity of engine oil is 1.2 liters, the top-up quantity is one liter.

The 16-inch (410 mm) MRF Zapper wide tyres for the rear wheel are no longer available in the Indian market.

== See also ==
- Yamaha Virago
- Yamaha Royal Star
