= Can't Get It Back =

2001 single by Blaque

Single by Blaque

from the album Blaque Out
- Released: October 16, 2001
- Length: 4:31
- Label: Columbia; Trackmasters
- Songwriters: Salaam Remi; Marlon Williams; Hernst Bellevue; Aubrey Gravatt; Joseph Freeman; Theodore Life; Natina Reed
- Producer: Remi

Blaque singles chronology
"As If" (2000)	"Can't Get It Back" (2001)	"I'm Good" (2003)

"Can't Get It Back" is a song by American recording group Blaque. It was written by Salaam Remi, Marlon Williams, and Hernst "StayBent" Bellevue, and band member Natina Reed for the group's second album, Blaque Out (2002). Production was helmed by Remi with co-production from Bellevue. The song samples from the song "We're Going to a Party" (1977) by American R&B singer Evelyn "Champagne" King. Due to the inclusion of the sample, Aubrey Gravatt, Joseph Freeman, and Theodore Life are also credited as songwriters.

"Can't Get It Back" was released as the first single on October 16, 2001, in the United States where it peaked at 91 on Billboard's Hot R&B/Hip-Hop Singles & Tracks chart. With Blaque Out eventually being shelved, "Can't Get It Back" was later re-recorded, remixed, and released by British girl group Mis-Teeq in 2003.

== Music video ==
A music video for the song was shot in Los Angeles, California, and directed by Liz Friedlander. The video was set to feature the girls dancing in separate apartments, throwing tantrums where they ripped pictures and discarded memories of their love interests. Due to undisclosed reasons, Columbia Records shelved the video; in 2010, a 30-second clip of the cancelled video leaked via YouTube.

== Remixes ==
A Trackmasters remix, produced by Poke and Tone, featuring Royce da 5'9", was included on the trio's promo vinyl pressing of the single. The remix was also featured on the 2007 and 2011 iTunes versions of Blaque Out.

== Track listings ==
All tracks written by Salaam Remi, Marlon Williams, Hernst Bellevue, Aubrey Gravatt, Joseph Freeman, Theodore Life, and Natina Reed.

US CD single
No.	Title	Producer(s)	Length
1.	"Can't Get It Back" (LP Version)	Remi; Staybent^{[a]}	4:07
2.	"Can't Get It Back" (Instrumental)	Remi; Staybent^{[a]}	4:02
3.	"Can't Get It Back" (Clean A-Cappella)	Remi; Staybent^{[a]}	4:05

Notes

- ^{^[a]} denotes co-producer

Sample credits

- "Can't Get It Back" contains excerpts from "We're Going to a Party" (1977) as performed by Evelyn "Champagne" King.

== Personnel ==
Personnel are adapted from the liner notes of Blaque Out.

- Hernst "StayBent" Bellevue – co-production, keyboards, writing
- Shamari Fears – vocals
- Joseph Freeman – writing (sample)
- Aubrey Gravatt – writing (sample)
- Theodore Life – writing (sample)
- Gary Noble – mixing engineer
- Chris Gehringer – mastering engineer
- Natina Reed – vocals, writing
- Salaam Remi – arrangement, production, writing
- Brandi Williams – vocals

== Charts ==
Weekly chart performance for "Can't Get It Back"
Chart (2001)	Peak position
US Hot R&B/Hip-Hop Songs (Billboard)	91

== Release history ==
Release dates and formats for "Can't Get It Back"
Region	Date	Format(s)	Label(s)	Ref.
United States	October 16, 2001	Rhythmic contemporary radio; urban contemporary radio	Trackmasters; Columbia	
United States	December 11, 2001	12-inch vinyl single	Trackmasters; Columbia	

== Mis-Teeq version ==
"Can't Get It Back"

Single by Mis-Teeq

from the album Eye Candy
- Released: June 30, 2003
- Length: 4:04 (album version); 3:34 (Ignorantz remix)
- Label: Telstar
- Songwriters: Remi; Williams; Bellevue; Gravatt; Freeman; Life; Alesha Dixon
- Producer: Remi

Mis-Teeq singles chronology
"Scandalous" (2003)	"Can't Get It Back" (2003)	"Style" (2003)

Music video
- "Can't Get It Back" on YouTube

In 2002, Mis-Teeq re-recorded "Can't Get It Back" for their second album Eye Candy (2003), including a modified introduction and a re-written bridge, written and performed by the group's member Alesha Dixon. The single was the group's seventh consecutive top-10 hit, peaking at number 8 on the UK Singles Chart. When it came to "Scandalous"'s follow-up release in June 2003, the group and their label Telstar Records decided to use a remixed version of "Can't Get It Back" as the official single version and instead the Ignorantz Remix was included in the video.

=== Track listings ===
UK CD1
No.	Title	Writer(s)	Producer(s)	Length
1.	"Can't Get It Back" (Ignorants Radio Edit)	Salaam Remi; Marlon Williams; Hernst Bellevue; Aubrey Gravatt; Joseph Freeman; Theodore Life; Alesha Dixon	Remi; Staybent^{[a]}; Trell and Marshall^{[b]}	3:38
2.	"Can't Get It Back" (Delinquent Remix)	Remi; Williams; Bellevue; Gravatt; Freeman; Life; Dixon	Remi; Staybent^{[a]}; Delinquent^{[b]}	5:12
3.	"Scandalous" (Rudeness Vocal Remix)	Dixon; Eriksen; Hermansen; Sabrina Washington; Su-Elise Nash	Stargate; Derrick McKenzie^{[b]}; Paul Stoney^{[b]}	6:21
4.	"Can't Get It Back" (Music video)			3:38

UK CD2
No.	Title	Writer(s)	Producer(s)	Length
1.	"Can't Get It Back" (Johnny Toobad Club Mix)	Remi; Williams; Bellevue; Gravatt; Freeman; Life; Dixon	Remi; Staybent^{[a]}; Johnny Toobad^{[b]}	6:06
2.	"Can't Get It Back" (Sticky Remix)	Remi; Williams; Bellevue; Gravatt; Freeman; Life; Dixon	Remi; Staybent^{[a]}; Sticky^{[b]}	5:58
3.	"Can't Get It Back" (Album Version)	Remi; Staybent^{[a]}; Williams; Bellevue; Gravatt; Freeman; Life; Dixon	Remi	4:07

Notes

- ^{^[a]} denotes co-producer
- ^{^[b]} denotes additional producer

Sample credits

- "Can't Get It Back (Album Version)" samples from "We're Going to a Party" (1977) as performed by Evelyn "Champagne" King.

=== Personnel ===
Personnel are adapted from the liner notes of Eye Candy.

- Hernst "StayBent" Bellevue – co-production, keyboards, writing
- Alesha Dixon – vocals, writing
- Joseph Freeman – writing (sample)
- Aubrey Gravatt – writing (sample)
- Angela Hunte – vocal production
- Theodore Life – writing (sample)
- Marley Marl – drum programming
- Su-Elise Nash – vocals
- Gary Noble – engineering
- Salaam Remi – arrangement, production, writing
- Sabrina Washington – vocals
- Marlon Williams – writing

=== Charts ===
==== Weekly charts ====
Weekly chart performance for "Can't Get It Back"
Chart (2003)	Peak position
Australia (ARIA)	80
Belgium (Ultratop 50 Flanders)	48
Belgium (Ultratip Bubbling Under Wallonia)	6
Ireland (IRMA)	14
Scotland Singles (Official Charts)	9
UK Singles (Official Charts)	8
UK Airplay (Music Week)	5
UK Hip Hop/R&B (Official Charts)	3

==== Year-end charts ====
Year-end chart performance for "Can't Get It Back"
Chart (2003)	Position
UK Airplay (Music Week)	37

=== Release history ===
Release dates and formats for "Can't Get It Back"
Region	Date	Format	Label	Ref(s)
United Kingdom	June 30, 2003	CD single	Telstar	
Australia	July 21, 2003	CD single	Telstar	
