= Deep Heat (compilation album) =

Compilation album
- Released: 1989
- Label: Telstar Records

chronology
Deep Heat (1989)	Deep Heat 2 – The Second Burn (1989)

The first volume of Telstar Records' Deep Heat compilation series was released 4 March 1989 and contained 26 tracks. It was hugely successful and reached No. 1 on the Compilations Chart. It achieved a UK gold disc for album sales in excess of 100,000 copies.

== Track listing ==
NB: Disc/cassette 1 (CD1 or Sides One and Two) features all 7" mixes while disc/cassette 2 (CD2/sides three and four) features all 12" mixes.

Side One

1. Adeva - "Respect"
2. Fast Eddie - "I Can Dance"
3. Richie Rich - "My D.J. (Pump It Up Some)"
4. Hard House - "Check This Out"
5. Hithouse - "Jack to the Sound of the Underground"
6. Sugar Bear - "Don't Scandalize Mine" (Vocal Mix)
7. Black Riot - "A Day in the Life"

Side Two

1. Royal House - "Yeah Buddy"
2. The Todd Terry Project - "Bango (To the Batmobile)"
3. Swan Lake - "In the Name of Love" (Club Mix)
4. Mr. Lee - "Rock This Place" (UK Club Mix)
5. Wee Papa Girl Rappers - "Soulmate"
6. Joe Smooth - "Promised Land"
7. Petula Clark - "Downtown '88"

Side Three

1. Fast Eddie - "Hip House" (Deep Mix)
2. Milli Vanilli - "Girl You Know It's True"
3. Kevin Saunderson - "Bounce Your Body to the Box" (Exclusive Mike "Hitman" Wilson Remix)
4. John Paul Barrett - "Should've Known Better" (Club Mix)
5. Smith & Mighty - "Walk On ..."
6. Raze - "Break 4 Love" (English 12" Mix)

Side Four

1. Royal House - "Can You Party" (Club Mix)
2. Hithouse - "Jack to the Sound of the Underground" (Acid Mix)
3. Humanoid - "Stakker Humanoid" (Snowman Mix)
4. Baby Ford - "Chikki Chikki Ahh Ahh"
5. Donnell Rush - "Knockin' at My Door" (Club Mix)
6. Bootleggers - "Hot Mix 3" (X-Plicit Mix)

This was the first of eleven volumes released between 1989 and 1991.
