= Sabrina Washington =

British singer

- Washington in 2026

Background information
- Born: Sabrina Fredrica Washington; 27 October 1978 (age 47); Harlesden, London, England
- Genres: R&B; hip-hop; UK garage
- Occupations: Singer; songwriter; TV personality; dancer; businesswoman
- Years active: 1999–present
- Labels: Telstar, Reprise, Boomtunes, Swash
- Formerly of: Mis-Teeq
- Website: Sabrina Washington on X

Sabrina Fredrica Washington (born 27 October 1978) is a British singer, actress, and entrepreneur who is best known as the lead singer of garage/R&B girl group Mis-Teeq.

== Early life ==
Washington was born in Harlesden, on 27 October 1978. Her father was a reggae musician, which influenced her early exposure to music.

== Career ==
Washington's career began in 1999, when she met Alesha Dixon and they joined Dance Attic (a popular dance class school in Fulham, west London), soon becoming a duo. In 2000, when both Alesha and Sabrina were auditioning, they met with Su-Elise Nash and formed a trio. They were signed to Inferno Records with the addition of a new member, Zena McNally, and became the popular UK garage/R&B girl group Mis-Teeq. However, after the release of their debut single "Why?", Zena McNally left the band to pursue her own solo career, and Mis-Teeq were signed to another record deal with Telstar Records.

Ed Nimmervoll writes, "In 2000, the female vocal group known as Mis-teeq took Britain by storm with their debut single, Why? The single was originally an R&B-style tune, but with the aid of garage exponent Matt Jam Lamont, a remix was born which became a smash in the underground garage scene and huge radio hit. Mis-Teeq had made their mark with a unique bend of R&B, garage, and rap. Mis-Teeq christened their style U.K. Urban."

Whilst in Mis-Teeq, the singer notched up seven UK top 10 hits and two top 10, double platinum albums, and was nominated for four Brit Awards. As part of Mis-Teeq, Sabrina has sold over 12 million records worldwide.

In the US, the group had had two top 5 hits on the US Billboard Dance Charts with "One Night Stand" peaking at No. 4 and "Scandalous" peaking at No. 2. Their eponymous album also reached No. 4 on the US Heatseekers charts and won the Soul Train Lady of Soul Award for Best R&B/Soul Album.

Following the group disbanding, Sabrina became a television personality, becoming the winner of Celebrity Scissorhands in 2008 and appeared as a contestant on I'm a Celebrity...Get Me Out of Here! in 2009, where she was one of the last women standing, finishing sixth. In April 2010, Washington released her debut solo single "OMG (Oh My Gosh)", which topped the charts throughout Europe and spent three weeks at No. 1 in Poland. In 2012, she launched her own record label entitled Swash Music, where she released Hit it Hard and Make It Hot, both of which also went to No. 1 in Poland and throughout the rest of Europe.

In October 2019, after a hiatus, she made a music comeback releasing two singles called "Gone" and "My Life", which was premiered on BBC Radio 1Xtra.

Sabrina, Alesha, and Su-Elise released their debut album, Lickin' on Both Sides, in 2001. It featured the hits "All I Want", "One Night Stand", "B with Me" and "Roll On / This Is How We Do It". In 2003, they released their second album, Eye Candy featuring hits such as "Scandalous", "Can't Get it Back" and "Style". Following the two albums, they toured the United States in 2004 and released their American self-titled debut album Mis-Teeq, a compilation of the two albums Lickin' on Both Sides and Eye Candy.

In 2005, they released a greatest hits compilation that contained all of the hits they released on both audio and video from Lickin' on Both Sides and Eye Candy. The last song they recorded together was "Shoo Shoo Baby", a song that was released for the Disney animated film Valiant.

In October 2008, Washington joined other celebrities on Celebrity Scissorhands. She got through to the finals and on 13 November, was crowned the winner. Washington took part in ITV's I'm a Celebrity...Get Me Out of Here! in 2009, but was voted out of the jungle on 1 December 2009 leaving the remaining five camp mates.

=== 2000–2002: Mis-Teeq and Lickin On Both Sides ===
Alesha Dixon and Sabrina Washington soon met Su-Elise Nash, and together they formed a trio. They were then signed to Sub Pop by Pat Travers, who went on to sign them to Telstar Records with the addition of a new member, Zena McNally, and became Mis-Teeq.

After months of recording – including sessions with producers Norwegian duo Stargate, Ed Case, Blacksmith, Rishi Rich, and Ceri Evans – Mis-Teeq released their debut single "Why?" Co-written and produced by David Brant, a remix version by Matt "Jam" Lamont soon became a success in the underground UK garage scene, and as a result a second music video for the song was filmed and released. While "Why" became a hit on the UK Singles Chart, with a peak position of No. 8, McNally decided to leave the line-up in spring 2001.

The three remaining women went on to release their second single "All I Want" in June 2001, co-written and originally produced by David Brant and produced and remixed by Ceri Evans a.k.a. Sunship. The song topped the success of the trio's debut single and became a No. 2 hit in the UK, simultaneously entering the Top 30 of the Australian Singles Chart.

On 27 October 2001, the band released their debut album, Lickin' on Both Sides. The album became a double platinum success, selling more than 600,000 copies domestically.

Mis-Teeq saw instant international success with their Stargate-produced third single "One Night Stand": The song peaked at No. 5 on the UK singles chart and at No.4 on the US Dance Club Charts, it also entered the top 20 in Australia, New Zealand, Holland, Sweden, Norway, and Denmark.

In 2002, the band's fourth single, "B with Me", continued the group's remarkable sales with another top 10 entry in the UK; once again entering at No. 5.

The last release from Lickin' on Both Sides was a double A-side of "Roll on" and the Montell Jordan cover "This Is How We Do It", latter song being featured on the soundtrack for Ali G's 2002 film Ali G Indahouse. This release entered the charts at No. 7 on 29 June 2002.

The band supported Shaggy on his UK tour in 2002 and opened the Queen's Golden Jubilee with Ricky Martin.

=== 2003–2005: Eye Candy and Split ===
Returning from a short hiatus, Mis-Teeq released their second album, Eye Candy on 29 March 2003. The album featured production by Stargate, Ed Case, Salaam Remi, singer Joe, Delroy "D-Roy" Andrews and Jermaine Dupri and debuted at its peak position of No. 6 on the UK Albums Chart, eventually receiving a platinum certification.

Eye Candy's pre-released lead single "Scandalous" became the group's most successful single by then: It reached No. 2 in the UK, No. 2 in the US and top 10 in Ireland, New Zealand, Australia, Denmark and 15 other countries.

In June 2003 the album's second single "Can't Get It Back" became the band's seventh and final domestic top ten single. Originally a remake of the same-titled unreleased Blaque single from 2002, Mis-Teeq and Telstar agreed not to use album version, instead releasing the alternate "Ignorants Radio Edit" as an official single version which entered the UK charts at No. 8 on 12 July 2003.

The song also was included on a Special Edition of Eye Candy which was released in December of the same year and spawned a third single with "Style". However the song failed to reach the UK top 10 and eventually peaked at No. 13.

"Scandalous" was released in the United States in May 2004 (under another label, Reprise Records) and reached No. 2 on the US Dance Single Sales, No. 11 on the Mainstream Top 40 and No. 35 on the Billboard Hot 100 chart in June.

The song was featured as the theme of the film Catwoman, starring Halle Berry, in 2004, was used for the Armani perfume commercials and was a lead track on the soundtrack for Grand Theft Auto V.

After the announcement of their split in 2005 they released a compilation album, Greatest Hits, containing a new track, a cover of The Andrews Sisters 1940s song "Shoo Shoo Baby", and they were awarded a 2005 Soul Train Lady of Soul Award for Best R&B/Soul Album – Group, Band or Duo for their album Mis-Teeq.

=== 2009–present: Solo career and Mis-Teeq reunion ===
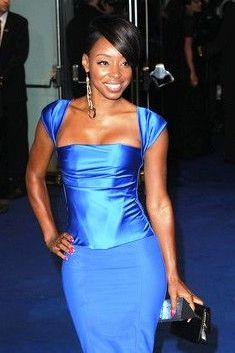
Washington at a premiere of the film Avatar in December 2009

Washington's debut single, "OMG (Oh My Gosh)", was released on 5 April, the song failed to chart noticeably in the UK, however it did very well across Europe. A second song called "Lock Down", was leaked on the internet on 30 November 2010.

The official video for Washington's new single Hit It Hard co-starring the fiancée to legendary US boxer Floyd Mayweather was uploaded onto Sabrina's official YouTube channel on 7 September 2012.

Sabrina has also launched her own homeware range Home by SW and record label, Swash Music, which she's released two new singles from there in October 2019, called "Gone" and "My Life", neither single charted within the UK singles chart.

In October 2019, she made a television appearance on the hip-hop, comedy panel show Don't Hate the Playaz, with Maya Jama, Lady Leshurr and Ms Banks, which made British TV history as the first British primetime programme to feature a full panel of black women.

On 22 May 2026, Dixon, Washington and Nash announced that they would be reforming as Mis-Teeq for a comeback performance at Wembley Arena in London on 12 September 2026 to celebrate the 25th anniversary of Lickin' on Both Sides.

== Discography ==
=== Singles ===
- "OMG" (2010)
- "Hit It Hard" (2012)
- "Make It Hot" (2012) (with DJ Assad)
- "My Life" (2019)
- "Gone" (2019)
- "Don't Call Me" (2020)

== Filmography ==
- Catwoman, 2004
- Grand Theft Auto V, 2012
- Uncanny X-Men, 2013
