= Mushtaq Omar Uddin =

English music producer, songwriter and vocalist (born 1973)

Mushtaq
- Also known as: Mushtaq; MC Mushtaq
- Born: Mushtaq Omar Uddin, 14 August 1973 (age 53); London, England
- Genres: Pop; Hip Hop; R&B
- Occupations: Composer / Music producer; singer; songwriter
- Years active: 1987–present
- Labels: Mercury; Sony Music Entertainment; Island; Universal; EMI

Mushtaq Omar Uddin (born 14 August 1973), also known simply as Mushtaq, is an English music producer, singer, songwriter, and former lead vocalist for British hip hop group Fun-Da-Mental when he was known at the time by his stage name MC Mushtaq.

== Early career ==
=== Asian Dub Foundation ===
As a young boy, Mushtaq joined the community band Joy Bangla as a drummer where he met brothers Sam (State of Bengal) and Deeder Zaman. This led to the foundation of an Asian Underground movement which provided sections of the British Asian youth with a homegrown alternative to the more standard/ mainstream Asian dance music of the time, bhangra and Bollywood. The collaboration became a regular on the UK electronic music scene through the Nineties and gained more prominence in the new millennium after gaining the attention from the likes of Icelandic singer Bjork and UK trip hop group Massive Attack. The group included Producer and DJ Sam Zaman, his brother Deedar and MC Mushtaq. State of Bengal took off when Zaman composed his best-known track to date, “Flight IC408,” which appeared on the 1997 Talvin Singh-helmed compilation Anokha ”“ Soundz of the Asian Underground. The compilation also included another track by Zaman, "Chittagong Chill".

=== Fun-Da-Mental ===
In the summer of 1993, Mushtaq met Aki "Propa-Gandhi" Nawaz and joined Fun-Da-Mental as the lead vocalist under the stage name of MC Mushtaq. This is the band who have mixed rap and hip-hop with qawwali singing from Pakistan or Gypsy music from Rajasthan, and recorded albums with titles like Why America Will Go To Hell. The bands first album Seize The Time Album was released in 1994 and peaked at No. 74 on the UK Albums Chart. The New York Times concluded that, "if their hard-edged music reflects a growing sense among nonwhites that they have little choice but to abandon traditional passiveness, it also reflects a broader and complicated effort to find an identity that transcends their Britishness."

=== 1990s/2000s: Hip Hop & R&B ===
During the 1990s, Mushtaq started his career as a "beat maker" in New York for a number '90s hip hop groups, including Cypress Hill, House of Pain and Souls of Mischief. On his return from America, Mushtaq co-wrote and produced several R&B albums. In 2001, he worked on Damage's album Since You've Been Gone, he co-wrote and produced the tracks "I Don't Know" (featuring Emma Bunton), "Good Folk", and "Maria" (featuring Kele Le Roc), and co-wrote "So What If I" (featuring Iceberg Slimm). He co-wrote and produced Mis-Teeq's album Lickin' on Both Sides, including the track "B with Me". Mushtaq worked on Liberty X's album Thinking It Over, Mushtaq co-wrote and co-produced the track "No Clouds", and co-wrote the track "Saturday".. He produced several tracks from Tyler James' 2005 album The Unlikely Lad, including the single "Foolish", and the track "Best for Me" (featuring Amy Winehouse). Mushtaq co-wrote and produced the song "Take Your Time" from Simon Webbe's 2006 album Grace.

== British pop ==
Mushtaq joined in a collaboration with the Specials fun boy Terry Hall; Mushtaq and Terry Hall collaborated on the album The Hour of Two Lights, released on August 12, 2003. This project marked a significant fusion of genres, blending Hall's ska and pop influences with Mushtaq's Asian Underground and electronic styles. The album was produced and co-written by the duo, with the exception of the track "Ten Eleven," which was co-written with Damon Albarn. It was released under the Honest Jon's label in Europe and distributed by Astralwerks in the U.S.stated as "Two of the pioneers of multicultural British pop are back with a daring, thoughtful set." by the Guardian Mushtaq co-wrote and produced the album The Hour of Two Lights with Terry Hall, released in August 2003.

Mushtaq co-wrote and produced Tyler James' song "Best for Me" featuring Amy Winehouse, which was featured on James' 2005 album The Unlikely Lad. He also produced and co-wrote Tyler James' song Foolish Mushtaq produced a remix of Winehouse's 2007 single "Back to Black".

Mushtaq, collaborated with British grime artist Skepta on the track “Hold On”, released on January 1, 2012. Mushtaq co-produced the song alongside Siggi Sigtryggsson, contributing to its electro-grime sound. The track was released as a digital download and received attention for its fusion of grime and electronic elements. Skepta's 2012 song "Hold On", the track "Des Mots" (featuring LFDV) from Kery James's 2013 album Dernier MC, a and 2013 song "On My Way". Mushtaq co-wrote and co-produced Tich's 2013 song "Dumb".

On 24 July 2000, Mushtaq's debut solo single "That Feelin'" was released by Mercury Records. This was followed by his debut album released later that year. The album features blues, reggae, funk and classic rock.

== Asian Pop ==
=== Storyteller Album ===
In 2004, Mushtaq worked on most of Raghav's 2004 album Storyteller and 2012 album The Phoenix including Let’s Work It Out, Can't Get Enough, No; Bad, Bad, Bad and Ain't Nobody The album reached No. 36 on the UK Albums Chart. Raghav shot to fame with his album ”Story Teller” with hits like Angel Eyes, Can't Get Enough' and Lets Work It Out. Story Teller is a debut album which is an intoxicating blend of East and west and got Rhythm and blues touch to it mixed with dhols, tablas and Hindi tunes to spice up things.

=== Desperado Song ===
In 2023, Mushtaq reunited with Raghav Mathur to co-produce and co-write the single “Desperado”, featuring Canadian artist Tesher. This track marked their first collaboration in over two decades, blending Indian musical influences with contemporary pop and urban sounds. The song received significant attention for its fusion of cross-cultural rhythms and modern production techniques, reaffirming Mushtaq's role as a versatile producer bridging South Asian and Western music scenes. The official video garnered tens of millions of views on YouTube, and the single amassed over 10 million streams on Spotify, highlighting its international appeal. He produced Raghav's first come back song since Desperado Raghav's Indo-Canadian's new come back song featuring fellow desi-origin artist Tesher. Produced by Mushtaq, the song samples R.D. Burman's "Chura Liya Hai Tumne Jo Dil Ko" (from the 1973 film Yaadon Ki Baaraat) and while it was too done-before for Raghav, the artist says his producer convinced him because they were using the oft-lesser heard Rafi vocal portion for "Desperado". The song which was released in April 2023 garnered over 36,054,388 views on Spotify alone. Besides being a certified hit on the popular video sharing platform, the independently released song managed to pave its way into everyone's heart through.

=== Singles ===
Mushtaq followed with release of Chingari featuring Indian Rapper Divine. The song celebrated Indipop sensation from the 2000s in collaboration with Raghav and Divine, which samples a couple of lines from Kishore Kumar's song Aadmi Jo Kehta Hai from Amitabh Bachchan's 1974 film Majboor. In February 2024 Choro was released on all social platforms.The song "Thumke Ka" by Raghav, produced by Mushtaq, was released on December 10, 2024.

== Asian Hip Hop ==
In 2025, Mushtaq collaborated extensively with New York-based rapper and singer Anik Khan on the Album ONĒK (Part 1), released in July 2025. Mushtaq served as the producer for the entire EP, blending contemporary hip-hop production with traditional South Asian musical elements. The project is noted for its innovative fusion of hard-hitting drums, classic Indian string samples, Arabic prayers, and live instrumentation, reflecting a rich diasporic soundscape.

The lead single from the EP, “Came From,” released on May 21, 2025, credits Mushtaq as one of the songwriters alongside Anik Khan and other collaborators including Marcus Nesta Gayle, Michael D. Maggiore, Thomas Manolakes, Waseel Amoura, Raginder Momi, and Nabir Dey. The track highlights themes of resilience and identity, resonating with immigrant and diasporic narratives. The collaboration has been praised for its cultural significance and sonic innovation. Music critics and fans have noted how Mushtaq's production brings a unique blend of traditional and modern sounds, described as a harmonious “fusion akin to the blend of spices in biryani.” The official lyric video for “Came From” further emphasizes the collaborative nature and message of the song. This partnership exemplifies Mushtaq's role in bridging South Asian musical heritage with global hip-hop trends, contributing to the evolving landscape of culturally conscious music.

== Personal life ==
Mushtaq was born in London to Bangladeshi and Iranian parents. He attended Quintin Kynaston Community Academy and studied sociology at Maria Fedeilis. He later received a scholarship at Guildhall School of Music and Drama to study contemporary composition. Mushtaq is a Muslim.

== Discography ==
=== Albums ===
Title	Album details
The Hour of Two Lights	Released: 12 August 2003; Label: Honest Jon's, EMI, Astralwerks; Formats: CD, digital download; Co-recorded with Terry Hall

=== Singles ===
Year	Single	Label
2001	"That Feelin'"	Mercury

== See also ==
- Asian Underground
- British Bangladeshis
- List of British Bangladeshis
