= N-Tyce =

British girl group

- Origin: London, United Kingdom
- Genres: Pop; R&B; hip hop
- Instrument: Vocals
- Years active: 1996–1999
- Labels: Telstar Records
- Past members: Donna Stubbs; Ario Obubore; Chantal Kerzner; Michelle Robinson

N-Tyce were a British four-piece girl group consisting of Ario Obubore, Chantal Kerzner, Donna Stubbs, and Michelle Robinson. The group recorded for Telstar Records in the late 1990s.

They emerged when the Spice Girls were at the peak of their fame. They clocked up four top-20 hit singles, including "We Come to Party" and "Boom Boom". The group also released an album, All Day Every Day. "We Come to Party" was also repackaged and marketed in the U.S. as the group's debut U.S. release.

== Discography ==
=== Albums ===
- All Day Every Day (1998) - UK No. 44

=== Singles ===
- "Hey DJ! (Play That Song)" (June 1997) - UK No. 20
- "We Come to Party" (September 1997) - UK No. 12
- "Telefunkin'" (February 1998) - UK No. 16
- "Boom Boom" (June 1998) - UK No. 18
