= Zena McNally =

English singer

- McNally in 2026

Background information
- Also known as: Zena
- Born: 8 March 1979 (age 47); Birmingham, England
- Genres: R&B; hip hop; UK garage
- Occupations: Singer; TV presenter; radio personality; dancer
- Years active: 1999–2007; 2026
- Labels: Warner; Telstar; Reprise
- Formerly of: Mis-Teeq

Zena McNally (born 8 March 1979) is an English former-radio presenter and singer, best known as one of the original members of girl-group Mis-Teeq. She left in early 2001, only featuring on the group's first single "Why", and made a guest appearance with the group in 2026.

McNally co-hosted the BBC 1Xtra Breakfast Show with Trevor Nelson from October 2007 to August 2008, leaving to move to the USA due to her then-husband's football career.

McNally married footballer Cory Gibbs in July 2008, eventually divorcing in 2014.

== Discography ==
=== Singles ===
Title	Year	Peak positions
Title	Year	UK
"Let's Get This Party Started"	2003	69
"Been Around the World"	2004	44
