= Blacksmith (musical group) =

British musical group

- Also known as: The Beat Lads
- Origin: Brixton, London, England
- Genres: Dance, R&B, hip hop, pop
- Years active: 1988–present
- Labels: FFRR, Feetmove Music Entertainment
- Members: Hugh Atkins (Tim Blacksmith); Karl Atkins (Karl Blacksmith); Peter Trotman (Peter Blacksmith)

Blacksmith are a British record production and remixing trio consisting of brothers Hugh and Karl Atkins, and Pete Trotman. They are also known by their aliases Tim Blacksmith, Karl Blacksmith and Peter Blacksmith, respectively.

In 1988, under the alias the Beat Lads they released the single "It's You" on 4th & Broadway Records then in 1989 and 1990 released the singles "Get Back to Love" and "Hold You Back" on London Records' sublabel FFRR. Among their earliest remixes (in 1989) include those of Bananarama's "Cruel Summer '89 (Swing Beat Dub)", Cookie Crew's "Come On & Get Some (Jack Swing Mix)", Big Daddy Kane's "Ain't No Stoppin' Us Now (Brixton Dance Hall Mix)" and the Brixton and UPSO mixes of Salt-N-Pepa's "Expression".

Throughout the 1990s and 2000s, they produced and remixed for many artists including Salt-N-Pepa, Eric B. & Rakim, DJ Jazzy Jeff & the Fresh Prince, Massive Attack, Tony! Toni! Toné!, Another Level, Eternal, N-Tyce, Five, the Brand New Heavies, Tina Moore, Fierce, Deetah, Christina Aguilera, Blue, Big Brovaz, Jamiroquai, Atomic Kitten, Lemar, Craig David and Mis-Teeq, among others.

Tim Blacksmith along with Danny D founded the publishing company Stellar Songs, and together are the executive producers and managers of the Norwegian songwriting and production team Stargate who have produced many top 10 and number one hits such as Billie Piper's "Day & Night", Hear'Say's "The Way to Your Love", Blue's "Sorry Seems to Be the Hardest Word", Ne-Yo's "So Sick", "Closer", "Beautiful Monster" and "Let Me Love You", Beyoncé and Shakira's "Beautiful Liar", Rihanna's "Take a Bow", "Only Girl (In the World)", "What's My Name?" and "Diamonds", and Sam Smith's "Too Good at Goodbyes".

== Discography ==
=== Singles ===
As the Beat Lads

- "It's You" (1988), 4th & Broadway

As Blacksmith

- "Get Back to Love" (1989), FFRR
- "Hold You Back" (1990), FFRR
- "Out of My Life" (1996), Feetmove Music Entertainment
- "Fight 4 the Right" (1998), Feetmove Music Entertainment
