= Scandalous (Mis-Teeq song) =

2003 single by Mis-Teeq

Single by Mis-Teeq

from the album Eye Candy
- Released: 17 March 2003
- Studio: StarGate (Norway)
- Length: 3:59
- Label: Telstar
- Songwriters: Mikkel S. Eriksen; Hallgeir Rustan; Tor Erik Hermansen; Alesha Dixon; Sabrina Washington; Su-Elise Nash
- Producer: StarGate

Mis-Teeq singles chronology
"Roll On" / "This Is How We Do It" (2002)	"Scandalous" (2003)	"Can't Get It Back" (2003)

Music video
- "Scandalous" on YouTube

Alternative cover
- US maxi-single cover

"Scandalous" is a song by British girl group Mis-Teeq. It was composed by band members Su-Elise Nash, Alesha Dixon, and Sabrina Washington along with frequent collaborators Hallgeir Rustan, Tor Erik Hermansen, and Mikkel Eriksen for their second studio album, Eye Candy (2003), with record production handled by the latter two under their production moniker StarGate. Written in the key of C minor, "Scandalous" is an up-tempo R&B song with a heavy bassline, strings, a siren sound, and suggestive lyrics.

The song became a hit throughout Europe and Oceania, reaching the top 10 in Australia, Denmark, Ireland, New Zealand, and the United Kingdom. "Scandalous" has sold 195,000 copies in the UK, becoming the group's biggest-selling single. In 2004, "Scandalous" was chosen as Mis-Teeq's second single in the United States, where it reached number 35 on the Billboard Hot 100, number two on the Billboard Dance Singles Sales chart, and number 11 on the Billboard Mainstream Top 40.

A mashup of "Scandalous" with the Redman & Adam F song "Smash Sumthin'" was performed live at the 2003 MOBO Awards, where the song was nominated for two awards, including "Best Video". The mashup, titled "Sumthin' Scandalous", appears on the limited edition of Eye Candy.

== Background and release ==
"Scandalous" was written by Mis-Teeq band members Alesha Dixon, Su-Elise Nash, and Sabrina Washington, along with Mikkel S. Eriksen, Hallgeir Rustan, and Tor Erik Hermansen from Norwegian production team StarGate. Recorded for the group's second studio album, Eye Candy, the song was initially considered for exclusion from the record, as the group felt that its sound was "too pop" in comparison with the album's broader musical direction. Reflecting on the decision, Nash stated that the group had undergone "this whole creative journey" and had been uncertain whether the track aligned with "where we were at musically," although their record label ultimately persuaded them to retain it, reportedly telling the group that they were "crazy" to consider omitting it.

== Release ==
Although Mis-Teeq had scored multiple UK hits, they did not have a US record deal until the release of "Scandalous" in 2004. The song's breakthrough in the United States came when television host Carson Daly heard the track while travelling in Europe and urged Warner to release it stateside. Warner Bros. Records subsequently issued a self-titled Mis-Teeq compilation album in the US, with "Scandalous" as its lead single. The song gained additional exposure through inclusion in the films Catwoman and Taxi, which also helped it achieve commercial success outside Europe.

== Music video ==
The music video was directed by Jake Nava. It starts at night, where a lone man is seen running through an urban, inner city area, and disabling CCTV cameras, with a vicious dog on a leash barking at him. The man then runs into an unused warehouse, the location of a secret nightclub where Mis-Teeq are seen. Street dance and breakdancing is predominantly seen throughout the rest of the video. The audio for the music video starts out as the radio version for most of the song, before transitioning to the Jazzwad remix from the middle of the bridge onwards.

== Track listings ==
- UK CD single
1. "Scandalous" (radio mix) – 4:02
2. "Scandalous" (Oracle remix) – 4:59
3. "Scandalous" (Jazzwad remix) – 4:41
4. "Scandalous" (Blacksmith radio remix) – 3:48
5. "Scandalous" (video)
- UK cassette single and European CD single
1. "Scandalous" (radio mix) – 4:02
2. "Scandalous" (Oracle remix) – 4:59
- Australian CD single
1. "Scandalous" (radio mix) – 4:00
2. "Scandalous" (Oracle remix) – 4:57
3. "Scandalous" (Jazzwad remix) – 4:40
4. "Scandalous" (Blacksmith radio remix) – 3:48
- US CD single
1. "Scandalous" (single version) – 3:58
2. "Scandalous" (Blacksmith radio remix) – 3:48
- US maxi-CD single
1. "Scandalous" (single version) – 3:58
2. "Scandalous" (Blacksmith remix) – 5:03
3. "Scandalous" (Jazzwad remix) – 4:47
4. "Scandalous" (Rudeness vocal remix) – 6:21
5. "Scandalous" (Bermudez & Griffin Stained Blue Dress mix) – 7:52

== Credits and personnel ==
Credits are taken from the Eye Candy album booklet.

Studios

- Recorded and mixed at StarGate Studios (Norway)
- Mastered at Metropolis Mastering (London, England)

Personnel

- StarGate – production
  - Mikkel S. Eriksen – writing, all instruments
  - Hallgeir Rustan – writing, all instruments
  - Tor Erik Hermansen – writing, all instruments
- Mis-Teeq – all vocals
  - Alesha Dixon – writing
  - Sabrina Washington – writing
  - Su-Elise Nash – writing
- Miles Showell – mastering

== Charts ==
=== Weekly charts ===
Chart (2003–2004)	Peak position
Australia (ARIA)	9
Australian Urban (ARIA)	5
Belgium (Ultratop 50 Flanders)	19
Belgium (Ultratop 50 Wallonia)	25
Canada CHR/Pop Top 30 (Radio & Records)	4
Canada Hot AC Top 30 (Radio & Records)	16
Denmark (Tracklisten)	9
Europe (Eurochart Hot 100)	13
Finland (Suomen virallinen lista)	19
France (SNEP)	27
Germany (GfK)	59
Greece (IFPI)	11
Hungary (Dance Top 40)	25
Ireland (IRMA)	3
Italy (FIMI)	33
Netherlands (Dutch Top 40 Tipparade)	7
Netherlands (Single Top 100)	34
New Zealand (Recorded Music NZ)	4
Romania (Romanian Top 100)	15
Scotland Singles (OCC)	3
Sweden (Sverigetopplistan)	35
Switzerland (Schweizer Hitparade)	35
UK Singles (OCC)	2
UK Airplay (Music Week)	4
UK Hip Hop/R&B (OCC)	1
US Billboard Hot 100	35
US Dance Club Play (Billboard) Remixes	32
US Dance Singles Sales (Billboard) Remixes	2
US Mainstream Top 40 (Billboard)	11

=== Year-end charts ===
Chart (2003)	Position
Australia (ARIA)	68
Belgium (Ultratop 50 Flanders)	88
Ireland (IRMA)	47
New Zealand (RIANZ)	50
UK Singles (OCC)	40
UK Airplay (Music Week)	9

Chart (2004)	Position
US Dance Radio Airplay (Billboard)	42
US Dance Singles Sales (Billboard)	23
US Mainstream Top 40 (Billboard)	51

== Certifications ==
Region	Certification	Certified units/sales
Australia (ARIA)	Gold	35,000^{^}
New Zealand (RMNZ)	Gold	15,000^{‡}
United Kingdom (BPI)	Gold	400,000^{‡}
^{^} Shipments figures based on certification alone.^{‡} Sales+streaming figures based on certification alone.

== Release history ==
Region	Date	Format	Label	Ref.
United Kingdom	17 March 2003	CD	Telstar	
Japan	31 March 2003	CD	Victor	
Australia	7 April 2003	CD	Telstar	
United States	12 April 2004	Contemporary hit radio	Reprise	
United States	15 June 2004	CD	Reprise	

== In popular culture ==
Mis-Teeq promoted the song by appearing in Coca-Cola television commercials aired in 2003 to coincide with the song's release, resulting in extra publicity. The song was then featured in promotions for the 2004 film Catwoman. Originally, the film's theme song was to be Britney Spears' "Outrageous", but Spears broke her knee on the set of the music video and the idea was scrapped. This resulted in "Scandalous" becoming the theme song. It was featured in Grand Theft Auto V on fictional radio station Non-Stop Pop FM and in 2024 film Madame Web.
