= Mis-Teeq =

British girl group

- Mis-Teeq performing in 2026 (L–R): Alesha Dixon, Sabrina Washington, Zena McNally and Su-Elise Nash

Background information
- Origin: London, England
- Genres: R&B; garage; hip-hop
- Works: Mis-Teeq discography
- Years active: 1999–2005; 2026
- Labels: Telstar; Warner; Reprise
- Past members: Sabrina Washington; Alesha Dixon; Su-Elise Nash; Zena McNally

Mis-Teeq (/mɪsˈtiːk/, 'mystique') were a British girl group formed in 1999, originally consisting of Sabrina Washington, Su-Elise Nash, Alesha Dixon and Zena McNally. McNally left the group after the release of their debut single "Why?" and the remaining members continued as a trio.

From 2001 to 2005, Mis-Teeq had two top-ten albums and seven consecutive top-ten singles on the UK Singles Chart, as well as success across Europe, Asia, Australia and the US. Their debut studio album, Lickin' on Both Sides, released on 27 October 2001, peaked at number three on the UK Albums Chart and was certified double platinum. The album featured the group's first five singles, all of which became UK top 10 hits, including their debut single, "Why?", and "All I Want".

On 29 March 2003, they released their second studio album, Eye Candy, also a double-platinum success. This album featured their biggest international hit, "Scandalous", which peaked at No. 2 on the United States Billboard Dance charts. The group announced in February 2005 that they would be splitting to pursue solo careers, owing to the demise of their record label Telstar Records. They released a greatest hits album on 25 April 2005 to coincide with their separation.

On 22 May 2026, the group announced that they would be reforming for a one off gig at Wembley Arena on 12 September 2026.

== History ==
=== 1997–2001: Formation and line-up changes ===
Alesha Dixon and Sabrina Washington met in 1997 at Dance Attic studios in Fulham through Louise Porter, who was putting together a group for her production company Big Out Ltd. The two worked with Louise Porter for a couple of years before being joined by Tina Barrett to form a trio performing singing and dancing. They were named Face2Face and were unsigned, and all band members still worked day jobs. Barrett left to join S Club 7 after a successful audition for Simon Fuller and was replaced by Zena McNally and Su-Elise Nash. Their then producer David Brant (writer of their first two hit singles, "Why?" and "All I Want") introduced them via DJ Darren Stokes (Tin Tin Out) to Inferno Records (sub pop) A&R man Pat Travers, who signed them via Louise Porter's Big Out Ltd to Telstar Records and the Group changed their name to Mis-Teeq. After months of recording—including sessions with producers Norwegian duo Stargate along with Brant (Vybrant Music), Ed Case, Blacksmith, Rishi Rich, and Ceri Evans—Mis-Teeq released their debut single in 2000, "Why?", a Latin-flavoured mid-tempo song co-written and produced by Brant. A garage remix by Matt "Jam" Lamont soon became a success in the underground UK garage scene, and as a result a second music video for the song was filmed and released. "Why?" became a hit on the UK Singles Chart with a peak position of number eight. McNally left the line-up in January 2001 saying she felt unhappy about "an unbalance in the group".

=== 2001–2002: Lickin' on Both Sides and touring ===
The group following McNally's departure in 2001

The three remaining members released their second single, "All I Want", in June 2001. It was co-written and originally produced by David Brant, and produced and remixed by Ceri Evans (also known as Sunship). The song topped the success of the trio's debut single, becoming a number 2 hit in the UK and simultaneously entering the top 30 of the Australian singles chart. The group released their debut album, Lickin' on Both Sides, on 27 October 2001. It was certified Platinum by the British Phonographic Industry on 7 September 2001.

Nevertheless, Mis-Teeq saw instant international success with their Stargate-produced third single, "One Night Stand". While the song peaked at number 5 on the UK singles chart, it also entered the top 20 in Australia, New Zealand, Norway, and Denmark. In 2002, the band's fourth single, "B with Me", continued the group's remarkable sales with another top 10 entry in the UK, once again entering at number 5. The last release from Lickin' on Both Sides was a double A-side of "Roll on" and the Montell Jordan cover "This Is How We Do It", the latter song being featured on the soundtrack for Ali G's 2002 film Ali G Indahouse. This release entered the charts at number 7 on 29 June 2002. The band supported Shaggy on his UK tour in 2002.

=== 2003–2005: Eye Candy, international breakthrough and split ===
Returning from a short hiatus, Mis-Teeq released their second album, Eye Candy, on 29 March 2003. The album featured production by Stargate, Ed Case, Salaam Remi, singer Joe, Delroy "D-Roy" Andrews, and JD (of the group So Solid Crew) and debuted at its peak position of number 6 on the UK Albums Chart. (Note: It does not automatically show up; you need to add category "albums" and certification "gold", then enter the name.) While Eye Candy's sales failed to link to the sudden success of Lickin' on Both Sides, pre-released lead single "Scandalous" became the group's most successful single by then: It reached number 2 in the UK and top 10 in Ireland, New Zealand, Australia, and Denmark.

In June 2003, the album's second single, "Can't Get It Back", became the band's seventh and final domestic top-ten single. Originally a remake of the same-titled unreleased Blaque single, Mis-Teeq and Telstar agreed not to use the album version, instead releasing the alternate "Ignorants Radio Edit" as an official single, which entered the UK charts at number 8 on 12 July 2003. The song also was included on a Special Edition of Eye Candy that was released in December of the same year and spawned a third single with "Style". The song peaked at number 13.

"Scandalous" was released in the United States in May 2004 (under another label, Reprise Records) and reached number 35 on the Billboard Hot 100 chart in June, making it their only single to chart in the U.S. That summer, it was featured as the theme song of the film Catwoman, starring Halle Berry.

As Mis-Teeq began promoting "Scandalous" in the United States and preparing for the release of their self-titled compilation album, the group's record label Telstar Records entered bankruptcy proceedings, leaving the group without clear professional direction. Although further recording opportunities with other labels were available, the members ultimately decided against continuing at the same pace, later citing personal and professional exhaustion following years of intensive touring and promotional commitments. Following the announcement of their split in February 2005, the group released a greatest hits album, featuring the newly recorded track "Shoo-Shoo Baby," a cover of the 1940s song originally recorded by The Andrews Sisters, which the group had previously contributed to the soundtrack of the animated war comedy film Valiant.

=== 2026: Reunion ===
Mis-Teeq performing at their One Night Stand show in September 2026

On 22 May 2026, the group announced that they would be reforming for a one off performance at Wembley Arena in London on 12 September 2026 to celebrate the 25th anniversary of their debut album Lickin' on Both Sides. Discussing the reunion, Dixon stated that although the group had received reunion offers in previous years, "it’s never felt right," adding that "this time, everything just lined up." Nash likewise described the event as "such a personal moment for us," stating that the group intended to "pour our absolute heart and souls into this." The concert also featured guest appearances from numerous other artists, as well as former member Zena McNally, who reunited with the group to perform their debut single "Why?". On 30 May 2026, the group made their first live performance since their reformation, appearing during the series 19 live final of Britain's Got Talent, where they performed a medley of their songs.

== Members ==
- Alesha Dixon (1999–2005; 2026)
- Sabrina Washington (1999–2005; 2026)
- Su-Elise Nash (2000–2005; 2026)
- Zena McNally (2000–2001)

== Discography ==
=== Studio albums ===
- Lickin' on Both Sides (2001)
- Eye Candy (2003)

=== Compilation albums ===
- Mis-Teeq (2004)
- Mis-Teeq: Greatest Hits (2005)
