= Sunship =

English musician and record producer

Ceri Evans, better known as Sunship, is an English record producer, DJ, remixer and jazz pianist.

Evans' musical career began in 1981 as a member of the jazz-funk band Swamp Children who released the album So Hot on Factory Records in 1982. He was an original member of acid jazz band the Brand New Heavies from 1985 until his departure from the group in 1992. Evans then entered into the dance music scene, producing and remixing under the alias Sunship on Dorado Records. He released his MOBO Award-winning self-titled debut album in 1997, followed by the UK garage album Is This Real in 1998. His best-known releases are his garage mixes of R&B girl group Mis-Teeq's "All I Want" and "One Night Stand" and his mix of Sweet Female Attitude's "Flowers" (all of which were top 5 hits in the UK), as well as his own releases such as "Try Me Out" featuring Anita Kelsey and "Cheque One Two" which both charted on the UK Singles Chart and were both top 5 hits on the UK Dance Chart in 1999 and 2000 respectively. He has remixed for many artists including Craig David, Christina Aguilera, E-17, Gabrielle, Mary J. Blige, Billy Crawford, Little Mix, Victoria Beckham, Cheryl Cole and Kelly Rowland, among others.

In 2013, Evans appeared alongside many other garage pioneers in a documentary exploring the legacy of UK garage, Rewind 4Ever: The History of UK Garage.

== Discography ==
=== Albums ===
- Sunship (1997), Filter
- Is This Real (1998), Filter
- Missing in (East) Acton (2017), Sunship Recordings
