= Ed Case (musician) =

English musician, producer, and DJ

- Birth name: Edwin Makromallis
- Genres: UK garage, jungle (early)
- Labels: Red Rose, Columbia, Killer Instinct

Edwin Makromallis, also known as Ed Case, is a London-based musician, producer, songwriter, and DJ.

== Career ==
Ed Case began his music career in the illegal rave scene of the late 1980s. This was followed by a stint working in hardcore and drum & bass clubs. Case however made his name in the UK garage scene of the late 1990s. He hosted a show on pirate radio, Freek FM. He released a string of underground hits, including "Something in Your Eyes" featuring Shelley Nelson, which peaked at 38 in the UK top 40. This track represented a dual turning point, since it was the first time Case had had a track chart, and prior, Case had only used vocal samples, and it was the first time he had worked with a live vocalist in his studio.

Ed Case achieved a greater level of mainstream pop fame with his remix of Gorillaz' "Clint Eastwood". He selected that track to remix because the original was 'quite slow', and he thought that his best contribution could be made in the form of a more energetic version, featuring MC Sweetie Irie.

== State Unknown ==
Ed Case linked up with Dan Genal in early 2013 to form State Unknown. They have performed DJ sets around the world, playing 'underground bass-driven tracks'.

== Discography ==
=== Studio albums ===
Title	Album details
Ed's Guest List	Released: 22 July 2002; Label: Columbia; Format: CD, LP

=== Singles and EPs ===
- "Untitled" (1994), Red Face Records
- "Ed's Venture" (1994), Red Face Records
- "Flowin Through" (with Jonnie P) (1998), Imperial Records
- Da Vibes EP - Donna Cousins & Ed Case (1998), Thirst Records
- "Take Control" (1998), Street Players
- "Something in Your Eyes" (1999/2000), Unit Five Records/Red Rose Recordings - UK #38
- "Fly By Girl" (feat. Reagan) (2000), 4most Records/Utmost Records
- "When I'm with You" (feat. Valerie M) (2000), FTL
- "It's Love" (2000), Sureshot Recordings
- "Trust We" (2000), Middlerow Records
- "Who?" (with Sweetie Irie) (2001), Columbia - UK #29
- "When I Roll" (2001), Killer Instinct
- "Blazin'" (2002), Killer Instinct
- "Scandalous" (2002), Bigger Beat Records
- "Good Times" (feat. Skin) (2002), Killer Instinct/Columbia - UK #49
- "Dun Know We / Hold It Up" (feat. N.S.A) (2002), Killer Instinct
- "Blazin (The Remixes)" (2005), Love 2 Funk
- "No More" (2005), Killer Instinct
- "Back on the Case" (2005), Love 2 Funk
- The Full Throttle EP (2006), Quality Control
- "Holding On" - (DJ Sparks & Ed Case feat. Louise (2006), Quality Control
- "All I Wanna Do" (feat. Oggie) (2007), Quality Control
- "River of Love" (with Shelley Nelson) (2008), Quality Control
- "Past Love" (2016), M.I. Raw

As Ed Case & Carl H

- Steppas EP (1998), Thirst Records
- The Deep EP (1998), Middlerow Records
- "Carnival Blues / Sound Boy" (feat. Spee) (1998), Middlerow Records
- The Live EP (1998), Middlerow Records
- "Hard on Me / Milo's Tune" (1998), Middlerow Records
- "I am Here" (feat. Frankie Paul) (1999), Ultimate Beats
- "I Wanna Be the One" (2000)
