= Su-Elise Nash =

English singer

- Nash in 2026

Background information
- Born: Su-Elise Michelle Nash; 22 May 1981 (age 45)
- Origin: Dulwich, London, England
- Genres: R&B, hip hop, UK garage
- Occupations: Singer, television personality
- Years active: 1999–present
- Member of: Mis-Teeq

Su-Elise Michelle Nash (born 22 May 1981) is an English singer who rose to fame in the girl group Mis-Teeq.

== Career ==
Nash was born in Dulwich, and is of Jamaican and English descent. As a member of Mis-Teeq with Sabrina Washington and Alesha Dixon. Nash performed in various talents since she was a child, but had commenced a business degree at Middlesex University before becoming a member of Mis-Teeq. She has four sisters, Lisa, Chrystina, Helena and Savannah. After the departure of Mis-Teeq, Nash continued with her studies, earning teaching qualifications, and has opened her own performing arts school called the "Su-Elise Stage School" based in Gravesend, Kent.

In September 2009 it was confirmed that during an interview at the MOBO Awards that Nash was working on her solo debut album entitled Long Way Round, due to be released in 2010. She described the album as a follow-up to Mis-Teeq's genre, which would be R&B.

In 2008 she featured on the television casting show Britain's Next Urban Superstar! as a judge.

In 2009, Nash provided vocals for Lethal Bizzle's "Going Out Tonight", which peaked at number 15 on the UK Dance Chart.

She appeared as a guest on I'm a Celebrity...Get Me Out of Here! while former Mis-Teeq bandmate Sabrina Washington participated in the show, and has appeared on Never Mind the Buzzcocks twice since 2003. She also appeared on Live from Studio Five twice between 2009 and 2010. She also appeared on Channel 4's Freshly Squeezed on 1 December 2009.

On 22 May 2026, Dixon, Washington and Nash announced that they would be reforming as Mis-Teeq for a comeback performance at Wembley Arena in London on 12 September 2026 to celebrate the 25th anniversary of Lickin' on Both Sides.
