= Telstar Records =

British record label

Telstar Records was a British record label that operated from 1982 to 2004.

== Background ==
Telstar Records was founded in 1982 by Sean O'Brien and Neil Palmer with a government loan of £120,000. It was launched as a specialist compilation marketing label and had hits with a range of compilation franchises such as the Deep Heat, Kaos Theory and 100% ranges. As well as these brands, the company licensed a number of major artist recordings (for example ABBA and the Four Tops) to release telemarketed compilations.

In the mid-1990s, it diversified its output into the singles market and long-term artist development. Until then, Telstar normally only released singles that were telemarketed or associated with acts like The Chippendales or Byker Grove's PJ & Duncan. Many of PJ & Duncan/Ant & Dec's early records came out XSRhythm, Telstar's dance music label, though by the mid-1990s this had been superseded by Multiply Records. This dance label was run by Mike Hall and originally featuring a large amount of acts licensed on a track-by-track basis from overseas companies, before becoming home to acts such as The Cheeky Girls.

Acts signed in the late 1990s period included Conner Reeves, Phats & Small and a Tony Mortimer-free version of East 17, while Craig David had two UK number one singles on the Wildstar label, a joint-venture between Telstar and the Capital Radio Group (now known as media company Global), which was run by music managers Ian McAndrew and Colin Lester.

Other artists included Victoria Beckham (in a £1.5 million deal arranged with Simon Fuller's 19 Recordings), Rosie Ribbons, Skream!, Danny Erskine and Mis-Teeq. In the late 1990s, Telstar became closely associated with BMG Records, especially with the Telstar TV compilation label.

Telstar Records went bankrupt in 2004, largely due to the company's habit of giving large advances to artists such as Claire Sweeney and Victoria Beckham who failed to make them any money. In the media much of the blame for the label's failure was placed on their most high-profile signing, Victoria Beckham. However, as most of Telstar's artists were not directly signed to the label, instead being either sub-licensed or part of a number of joint ventures, BMG (soon to be merged with Sony) declined to buy the label's assets outright.

The majority of Telstar's back catalogue (the artists signed directly to the label not sub-licensed) ended up with Phoenix Music International alongside the rights to songs from Gut Records, Jet Star and Azuli, whilst Ant & Dec's hits ended up being sub-licensed to BBC Studios' Crimson Productions/DMG TV in the early 2010s (which resulted in a number one hit for DMG TV's Edsel label in 2013 when "Let's Get Ready to Rhumble" charted again). In February 2017, the remains of Wildstar was bought by Sony Music Entertainment UK, a company who signed Craig David in 2016 (in a deal which was part of another joint venture called Insanity Records), whilst Ian McAndrew runs management company Wildlife, home to Miles Kane, Psychedelic Porn Crumpets and Royal Blood.

== Artists ==
=== Telstar ===
- Ant & Dec (also as PJ & Duncan)
- BBMak
- Victoria Beckham (from 19)
- Ladytron
- Crush (ex-Byker Grove)
- E-17
- Danny Erskine
- Monk & Canatella
- Vinnie Jones
- Mis-Teeq (from Inferno Cool – recordings owned by Twenty First Artists Ltd)
- N-Tyce
- Harry
- Maria Willson
- Poloroid
- Specialist Compilation Marketing:
  - ABBA (compilation with tracks licensed from Polar)
  - Daniel O'Donnell
  - Diana Ross
  - Marvin Gaye (compilation with various licensing deals)
  - Maggie Moon
  - Jive Bunny and the Mastermixers
  - Bonnie Tyler
  - Heatwave (Disco remixes)
  - Bad Manners
  - Boney M. (compilation with tracks licensed from MCI/BMG Germany)
  - Electric Light Orchestra
  - Roy Orbison

=== T2 ===
- Claire Sweeney
- Rosie Ribbons

=== Telescope ===
- London Symphony Orchestra – Classic Rock series

=== Multiply ===
- Sash! (licensed from mainland Europe)
- Phats and Small
- Basement Jaxx (licensed from Atlantic Jaxx)
- Fabulous Baker Boys
- The Cheeky Girls

=== Wildstar ===
Wildstar Records was a record label launched in 1993 by Colin Lester, Ian McAndrew and Capital Radio in a joint venture with Telstar. In February 2017, Sony Music acquired Wildstar from Global Radio and Telstar for £1.8m.

- Alda
- Conner Reeves
- Craig David
- De Nada
- Fierce
- Lutricia McNeal

=== XSrhythm ===
- The Chippendales
- PJ and Duncan a.k.a. Ant and Dec

== Compilation brands ==
- Deep Heat
- 100%
- Euphoria (to Ministry of Sound)
- The Greatest Hits of... (yearly compilation series e.g. The Greatest Hits of 1987)
- Hits 93 / Hits 94 (these were listed as part of the Hits Album brand in the Complete Book of British Charts due to Telstar TV's later involvement with the series, but were actually released by Telstar in joint venture status with BMG. There was later a Pure Hits 97)
- Box Hits (to UMTV)
- Megabass
- Brit Awards (to Sony BMG)
- Kaos Theory

In the late 1990s, Telstar's successful dance music compilation series Euphoria and Breakdown (full name The Very Best of Euphoric Breakdown) were launched, both of which lasted into the days when BMG were co-credited on compilations, and transcended Telstar Records' closure when they were continued on the Ministry of Sound label.

=== Chart Attack ===
Chart Attack was Telstar Records' first chart hit on the UK Top 75 album charts. It was released in autumn 1982 and reached number 7 in the main chart in the days before the exclusion of such various artist albums.

== See also ==
- Lists of record labels
