= Children in Need 2008 =

UK charitable campaign and television show

- Genre: Entertainment; Fundraising
- Presented by: Terry Wogan; Fearne Cotton; Tess Daly; Alesha Dixon
- Country of origin: United Kingdom
- Original language: English

Production
- Production location: BBC Television Centre
- Camera setup: Multiple
- Running time: 180 mins (Part 1); 205 mins (Part 2)

Original release
- Network: BBC One, BBC Two
- Release: 14 November – 15 November 2008

Related
- Children in Need 2007; Children in Need 2009; Celebrity Scissorhands

Children in Need 2008 was a campaign held in the United Kingdom to raise money for Children in Need. It culminated in a live broadcast on BBC One on the evening of Friday 14 November, through to the morning of Saturday 15 November. The broadcast was hosted by Terry Wogan, Fearne Cotton and Tess Daly joined by other guest presenters throughout the night, including Alesha Dixon presenting from BT Tower. The voice-over reading out running totals was Alan Dedicoat. The 2008 event broke all previous records, with a total of £20,991,216 raised by the end of the broadcast.

== Television campaign ==
=== Artist performances ===
- The 2008 show opened with McFly performing "Stay With Me", one of the songs from this year's official Children in Need double A side single, before rushing off to Birmingham, to continue their Radio:ACTIVE tour
- Emma Barton from EastEnders performed "You to Me are Everything"
- Boyzone performed their latest single "Love You Anyway" live from the Belfast Children in Need event
- Duffy performed "Rain on Your Parade" from her album Rockferry
- Leon Jackson gave an exclusive first performance of "Creative" – the second single to be released from his album Right Now
- Girls Aloud performed their Number 1 hit "The Promise" from their album Out of Control
- Take That performed their new single "Greatest Day"
- Sugababes opened the second part of the show with "Girls"
- McFly appeared again to perform the other song from the double A side "Do Ya." This was pre-recorded due to the band leaving early
- Duffy made a second appearance to perform her song "Mercy"
- Alesha Dixon made a second appearance, this time singing "The Boy Does Nothing" from her album The Alesha Show
- One Night Only performed "Just for Tonight"
- Il Divo performed "The Power of Love (La Fuerza Mayor)" from their 2008 album The Promise
- Boyzone made a second appearance to perform "Love Me for a Reason", again live from Belfast
- Will Young performed his new single "Grace" from his album Let It Go
- Stereophonics performed "Have a Nice Day" from their 2001 album Just Enough Education to Perform from the Cardiff event
- John Barrowman performed "What About Us" from his second album Music Music Music
- Jason Donovan performed a cover version of "Be My Baby"
- James Morrison and Keisha Buchanan performed a duet of "Broken Strings", a song he originally recorded with Nelly Furtado
- Russell Watson performed a cover of "Me and Mrs. Jones"
- Sharleen Spiteri performed "All the Times I Cried" from her solo album Melody in Glasgow
- Enya performed "Trains and Winter Rains" from her 2008 album And Winter Came... from Belfast
- Katie Melua performed "The Closest Thing to Crazy" from her first album Call Off the Search
- Revelation, finalists in "Last Choir Standing" and Sharon D. Clarke, one of the judges from the show, performed a cover of "Ain't No Mountain High Enough"

=== Cast performances ===
- The cast of The Bill put together a tribute to The Blues Brothers
- The cast from the 2009 revival of Oliver! performed a medley of songs from the show featuring the winners of I'd Do Anything (shown twice throughout the broadcast, the second time was to replace a scheduled appearance by Razorlight who had to pull out at the last minute due to illness)
- The cast of EastEnders performed a tribute to West End Theatre featuring songs from Moulin Rouge!, My Fair Lady, Saturday Night Fever, Billy Elliot and Mary Poppins (shown twice throughout the broadcast)
- The BBC Newsreaders performed a tribute to ABBA as their 2008 contribution
- A group of BBC presenters (including Blue Peter, Match of the Day, TMi and also ITV's Al Murray) lip synced to "Rockstar"
- The cast of the London production of Hairspray arrived straight from the night's production to perform "You Can't Stop the Beat"
- The crew from DIY SOS performed a cover of "Addicted to Love"

=== Others ===
- Merlin in Need a special 2 minute sketch from Merlin.
- A special junior edition of MasterChef
- A special episode of Strictly Come Dancing with Terry Wogan and Flavia Cacace dancing against regular 'Strictly' presenter Tess Daly who was partnered with Anton Du Beke
- A preview clip from the 2008 Christmas Special of Doctor Who (shown twice throughout the broadcast)
- A special, How to Look Good Naked in Weatherfield, a combination of Coronation Street and How to Look Good Naked (shown twice throughout the broadcast)
- A sketch of The Royle Family sitting watching Children in Need
- Another combination, this time Richard Hammond from Top Gear appeared in a special one off mini episode of Ashes to Ashes (shown twice throughout the broadcast)
- A short sketch of Alex Salmond MSP (Scottish First Minister), portraying Rikki Fulton's Rev I M Jolly. This was only shown in the Scottish region
- WWE wrestler Kofi Kingston and Hardeep Singh Kohli had a match on a WWE video game. This was only shown in the Scottish Region.

=== QI ===
During the customary break for the BBC News at Ten the first episode of the 6th series of QI was screened on BBC Two. The episode had a Children in Need theme. As with previous Children in Need specials, it guest starred Pudsey Bear, David Mitchell and Ronni Ancona, however immediately following the contestant introductions, Terry Wogan appeared to dismiss Pudsey and take his place. Stephen Fry admitted on Twitter that the special was recorded in May or June of this year.

=== Celebrity Scissorhands ===
A third series of Celebrity Scissorhands was shown in the run up to the 2008 event, again featuring celebrity hairdresser Lee Stafford and Steve Strange as lead stylist. The winner was Sabrina Washington with Jeff Leach as the runner up.

== Official single ==
On 30 October 2008 the BBC announced that the 2008 Children in Need official single would be a double A side of "Do Ya" and a cover of Faces "Stay With Me" by British pop band McFly. The songs were released for download on 23 November and in stores the following day, with all profits raised going to the appeal. The band performed both songs as part of the 2008 broadcast on BBC1. "Do Ya" charted at Number 18 on 30 November 2008, making it the lowest chart entry for a Children in Need song to date.

== Other activities ==
As in previous years, the TV show Countryfile sold a calendar in aid of the appeal. In 2008, it raised £369,000.

== Regional Opt-Outs ==
Every BBC English Region hosted their own event with coverage throughout the telethon. BBC Wales, BBC Scotland and BBC Northern Ireland hosted their own opt out telethons alongside the main one in London

The locations were:

- BBC East - Cambridge at Cambridge Ice Arena
- BBC East Midlands - Derby at the Westfield Shopping Centre
- BBC London - at Wembley Arena Square
- BBC North East and Cumbria - Sunderland at Sunderland Aquatic Centre
- BBC North West - Stretford at Chill Factore
- BBC South - Basingstoke at the Milestones Museum
- BBC South East - Chatham at Dickens World
- BBC South West - Launceston at Dingles Fairground Heritage Centre
- BBC West - Minehead at Butlin's
- BBC West Midlands - Brierley Hill at the Merry Hill Centre
- BBC Yorkshire - Sheffield at Meadowhall Shopping Centre
- BBC Yorkshire and Lincolnshire - Bridlington at Bridlington Spa

- BBC Wales - Cardiff at Wales Millennium Centre
- BBC Northern Ireland - Belfast at The Kings Hall
- BBC Scotland - Glasgow at BBC Pacific Quay

== Totals ==
The following are totals with the times they were announced on the televised show.

Date	Time	Total
2008-11-14	20:05 GMT	£5,979,296
2008-11-14	21:05 GMT	£7,595,182
2008-11-14	21:33 GMT	£10,461,062
2008-11-14	21:59 GMT	£11,461,855
2008-11-14	22:45 GMT	£13,736,493
2008-11-14	23:33 GMT	£15,709,376
2008-11-15	00:31 GMT	£18,127,452
2008-11-15	01:06 GMT	£19,934,232
2008-11-15	01:53 GMT	£20,991,216

It was announced during the broadcast that since 1980 the appeal had raised over £500,000,000 towards helping children in the UK.

== See also ==
- Children in Need
