= To Love Again (song) =

Single by Alesha Dixon

from the album The Alesha Show – Encore
- B-side: "Breathe Slow" (Piano Mix); "Before the Sun Goes Down"
- Released: 15 November 2009
- Studio: Henson, Hollywood, California
- Genre: R&B
- Length: 3:51
- Label: Asylum
- Songwriter(s): Alesha Dixon; Gary Barlow; John Shanks
- Producer(s): Shanks; Barlow

Alesha Dixon singles chronology
"Let's Get Excited" (2009)	"To Love Again" (2009)	"Drummer Boy" (2010)

"To Love Again" is the first single from a re-release of Alesha Dixon's second album, The Alesha Show, entitled The Alesha Show – Encore released by Asylum Records. The song is produced by John Shanks and written by Gary Barlow, and is one of four new tracks that appears on the re-release. Bimbo Jones has done a club remix for the song. The first week sales raised from the song were donated to Children in Need.

== Background ==
Dixon and Barlow met in Los Angeles with John Shanks and penned the song within the day. Dixon wrote the lyrics about recovering from her divorce with MC Harvey a few years previously. Dixon praised Barlow, describing him as a "genius" and explained the reason for creating the track together; "We've become really good friends since going up the mountain together for Comic Relief. He is a genius so it was an absolute honour to write the song with him."

== Composition ==
"To Love Again" is a R&B influenced ballad that lasts 3 minutes and 51 seconds. The song consists of 67 beats per minute; a moderate tempo. The instruments primarily used throughout the song are the piano and the guitar. The song is written in the key of A minor and Dixon's vocal range spans from F_{3} to C_{5}. Fraser McAlpine of the BBC commented that "it's a plaintive ballad, which starts kind of small and intimate and ends kind of huge and expanded [...] It sounds for all the world like a classic Gary Barlow ballad - a slower 'Patience'". Music website TeenToday noted Dixon's vocal ability, saying " Dixon's voice has never sounded better – and in fact, seems to have got a bit stronger".

== Music video ==
The music video was originally intended to be filmed in Prague, however, the video shoot coincided with a papal visit by Pope Benedict XVI, and filming difficulties would occur. Also, Charles Bridge, which was planned to feature throughout the video was clad in scaffolding, causing more filming complications. The new video, shot on 8 October 2009 in Battersea Park, London, features Dixon walking through a misty park with autumn leaves scattered across the ground. Her love interest throughout the video appears then disappears intermittently, giving the impression he is spirit-like. The video ends at night with Dixon stood in the park in the centre of a group of people, with skyscrapers in the backdrop, with an array of sky lanterns flying in the sky. The video premiered on 4Music on 13 October 2009 at 7:00pm GMT. The video was directed by Big TV!.

== Chart performance ==
The song entered the UK Singles Chart at 15; this would be the peak position it would reach. The next week "To Love Again" dropped 11 places to 26 in the charts and by week 3 it had disappeared from the Top 40 entirely; it had dropped to 50 in the charts. Week 3 became the last week it charted in, before dropping out of the Top 75. Peaking a 15, "To Love Again" became Dixon's lowest charting single since "Knockdown" in 2006, which charted at 45. "To Love Again", despite being released in Ireland, failed to chart on the Irish Singles Chart, though every single Dixon has released has fared less well in the Irish charts than the UK charts.

== Live performances ==
Dixon performed the song first on 20 November at the Children in Need 2009 telethon event on BBC1, which she also co-hosted with Terry Wogan and Tess Daly. Additionally, Dixon performed "The Boy Does Nothing" at Children in Need too. On 24 November Dixon sang live at GMTV. Dixon then performed "To Love Again" on 27 November on The Alan Titchmarsh Show. Dixon did perform on Alan Carr: Chatty Man, however she neglected to play "To Love Again", and chose instead to perform "The Light", an album track from The Alesha Show – Encore.

== Charts ==
Chart (2009)	Peak position
Scotland (OCC)	23
Slovakia (Rádio Top 100)	57
UK Singles (OCC)	15
UK Singles Downloads (OCC)	17

== Track listing ==
- UK CD Single / UK Promo CD / Digital download
1. "To Love Again" – 3:51
- 4-Track UK Promo CD
1. "To Love Again (Bimbo Jones Remix)" – 6:28
2. "To Love Again (Bimbo Jones Instrumental)" – 6:28
3. "To Love Again (Bimbo Jones Radio Edit)" – 3:49
4. "To Love Again" – 3:51
- Digital download EP
1. "To Love Again" – 3:51
2. "Breathe Slow" (Piano Remix) – 3:39
3. "Before the Sun Goes Down" – 3:07
- Bimbo Jones Digital download
1. "To Love Again" (The Bimbo Jones Remix) - 3:49

== Release history ==
Region	Date	Format	Label
United Kingdom	15 November 2009	Digital download	Asylum Records
United Kingdom	16 November 2009	CD single, Maxi single	Asylum Records
