= Cockman =

Cockman is a surname. Notable people with the surname include:

- Jim Cockman (1873–1947), American baseball player
- Thomas Cockman (1675–1745), Oxford academic and administrator
- The Cockman Family, bluegrass/Gospel band from North Carolina, United States
