= Stay Down (Mary J. Blige song) =

Single by Mary J. Blige

from the album Growing Pains
- Released: March 18, 2008
- Genre: R&B
- Length: 4:22
- Label: Matriarch; Geffen
- Songwriters: Mary J. Blige; Johnta Austin; Bryan-Michael Cox
- Producer: Bryan-Michael Cox

Mary J. Blige singles chronology
"Work That" (2007)	"Stay Down" (2008)	"IfULeave" (2008)

Music video
- "Stay Down" on YouTube

"Stay Down" is a song by American singer Mary J. Blige, taken from her eighth studio album, Growing Pains (2007). It was written by Blige along with Johnta Austin and Bryan-Michael Cox, while production was helmed by Box. Released as the album's third and final single, it replaced "Hurt Again", that was released for a short time for airplay, but at the last minute was canceled in the favor of "Stay Down".

== Critical reception ==
BET.com wrote of the song: "One of Mary's strongest assets is her relatability – she always makes the listener feel like each song could be about their own life. And for anyone who's struggled to keep a long-term relationship going, this earnest single [...] will seem all too real. Don't miss the hilariously random Weezy reference."

== Music video ==
A music video for "Stay Down" was directed by Hype Williams and premiered on April 17, 2008. It features several close shots of Blige as well as many landscape scenes.

== Credits and personnel ==
Credits adapted from the Growing Pains liner notes.

- Johnta Austin – writer
- Nick Banns – additional engineer
- Mary J. Blige – vocals, writer
- Dru Castro – additional engineer
- Bryan-Michael Cox – producer, writer
- Ron Fair – arrangement, conductor
- Kuk Harrell – vocal producer, recording
- Alec Newell – recording
- Chris "Tek" O'Ryan – additional engineer
- Sam Thomas – recording

== Charts ==
Chart (2008)	Peak position
New Zealand Urban Airplay (RMNZ)	22
US Hot R&B/Hip-Hop Songs (Billboard)	34
