= Just Fine =

2007 single by Mary J. Blige

Single by Mary J. Blige

from the album Growing Pains
- Released: October 16, 2007
- Length: 4:02
- Label: Geffen
- Songwriters: Mary J. Blige; Christopher Stewart; Terius Nash; Phalon Alexander
- Producers: Jazze Pha; Tricky Stewart; Kaire Swan

Mary J. Blige singles chronology
"Runaway Love" (2007)	"Just Fine" (2007)	"Work That" (2007)

Music video
- "Just Fine" on YouTube

"Just Fine" is a song by American singer Mary J. Blige. It was written by Blige, Terius "The-Dream" Nash, Jazze Pha and Tricky Stewart for her eighth studio album, Growing Pains (2007), while production was helmed by Pha and Stewart. It was released as the album's lead single on October 16, 2007. The song peaked at number 22 on the US Billboard Hot 100 and number 16 on the UK Singles Chart, while also topping the US Hot Dance Club Play chart.

Critically acclaimed, "Just Fine" was nominated in the Best Female R&B Vocal Performance category at the 50th Annual Grammy Awards, held February 2008, as well as the Grammy for Best Remixed Recording, Non-Classical at the 51st Grammy Awards in February 2009. In addition, the song was ranked 41st on Rolling Stone's list of the 100 Best Songs of 2007.

== Background ==
"Just Fine" was written by Mary J. Blige along with The-Dream, Jazze Pha and Tricky Stewart, while production was helmed by Pha and Stewart, with Kuk Harrell serving as a vocal producer. Initially presented as an incomplete song to Blige, Nash, Pha, and Stewart finished much of the "upbeat" dance pop song within 24 hours. It became one of the first songs which Blige recorded for parent album Growing Pains and would set much of the tone for the remaining material. Blige commented on the sound of the song: "When I heard the beat, I was like, 'OK, this is hot. This is making my body move, and I'm having fun."

A cheerful, feel-good jam "about uplifting yourself and having hope for your future, whatever your future is," Blige tried to "make the song about how I appreciate the good days I do have and where I'm at right now, even though I still have challenges." In a 2007 interview with MTV News, she further elaborated: "That song was written based on me having a good day. You know, I can have 20 bad days. I can have as many bad days as anyone. But I choose to say, "I'm just fine." Right now. So it's OK to have those days. So instead of coming with something ungrateful to the universe, how about I come with something first that's says, 'You know what? It's OK. Enjoy this day if you're having a great day."

== Critical reception ==
"Just Fine" earned generally positive reviews from music critics. Da'Shan Smith from uDiscoverMusic found that "there can’t be a wedding, office party, cookout, or family reunion function without hearing this gem from Mary [...] Channeling the funk groove of Marvin Gaye and the disco beat of Michael Jackson circa Off the Wall, "Just Fine" is a quintessential throwback party anthem." Alexis Petridis from The Guardian wrote: "Blige in gleeful party-starting mode, complete with opening get-on-the-dancefloor monologue. "Just Fine"'s rhythm track was apparently inspired by Michael Jackson’s "Don't Stop 'Til You Get Enough." Its sparse-but-urgent sound and Blige’s exuberance are both completely irresistible." Similarly BET.com wrote of the song: "This 2007 hit cheerfully channels Off the Wall MJ, perfectly encapsulating new-millennium Mary's hard-earned transformation into a persevering, you-go-girl optimist who declares, "I like what I see when I'm looking at me when I'm walking past the mirror"."

=== Year-end lists ===
Year-end lists for "Just Fine"
Publication	Accolade	Rank	Ref.
Rolling Stone	The 100 Best Songs of 2007	41	

== Accolades ==
Awards and nominations for "Just Fine"
Organization	Year	Category	Result	Ref.
BET Awards	2008	Video of the Year	Nominated	
Grammy Awards	2008	Best Female R&B Vocal Performance	Nominated	
Grammy Awards	2009	Best Remixed Recording, Non-Classical	Nominated	
MTV Video Music Awards	2008	Best Hip Hop Video	Nominated	
MTV Video Music Awards Japan	2008	Best R&B Video	Nominated	
NAACP Image Awards	2008	Outstanding Music Video	Nominated	

== Remixes ==
The official remix was called "Just Fine (Treat 'Em Right Remix)" (which samples "Treat 'Em Right" by Chubb Rock) and features a verse from Lil Wayne, and production handled by Swizz Beatz, who also provides background vocals. There are four versions of this remix: The main remix version has Lil Wayne's verse on the beginning after the intro, the second remix version features a verse by Precise, along with Lil Wayne, the third remix version has Lil Wayne's verse on the near end of the song, and the fourth remix version is a no rap version, omitting Lil Wayne's verse.

The second official remix of "Just Fine" features Lil' Mama, which was a pre-order only track on iTunes when the album was released. An alternate music video for this remix was produced.

== Music video ==
A music video for "Just Fine" was directed by Chris Applebaum and produced by John Hardin for Reactor Films. It was released online on October 8, 2007 and premiered simultaneously on BET, iTunes, VH1 and MTV's TRL on October 25, 2007. In the visuals, Blige "radiates with positive energy as she enters a mirrored room and begins her own personal fashion show." Billboard found that the clip pays homage to the Michael Jackson in the colorful visual. Entertainment Weekly noted that "groundbreaking CGI it ain’t, but all three MJBs [versions] look fabulous."

On September 7, 2008, the video was nominated for Best Hip-Hop Video at the 2008 MTV Video Music Awards, though it eventually lost to Lil Wayne's "Lollipop" (2008). The video also was nominated for Video of the Year at the BET Awards 2008, Best R&B Video at the 2008 MTV Video Music Awards Japan, and Outstanding Music Video at the 40th NAACP Image Awards.

== Track listings ==
Digital single
No.	Title	Writer(s)	Producer(s)	Length
1.	"Just Fine"	Blige; Terius Nash; Christopher Stewart; Phalon Alexander	Stewart; Pha; Kuk Harrell^{[a]}	4:10
2.	"Work That"	Blige; Theron Feemster; Sean Garrett	Feemster; Garrett^{[b]}	3:30

Lil Mama Remix
No.	Title	Writer(s)	Producer(s)	Length
1.	"Just Fine" (Remix featuring Lil Mama)	Blige; Nash; Stewart; Pha; Alexander; Niatia Kirkland	Stewart; Pha; Harrell^{[a]}	3:44

Treat 'Em Right Remix
No.	Title	Writer(s)	Producer(s)	Length
1.	"Just Fine" (Treat 'Em Right Remix featuring Lil Wayne)	Blige; Nash; Stewart; Pha; Alexander; Dwayne Carter, Jr.; Richard Simpson; Howard Thompson	Stewart; Pha; Harrell^{[a]}	5:09

Notes

- ^{^[a]} denotes a vocal producer
- ^{^[b]} denotes a co-producer

Sample credits

- "Just Fine (Treat 'Em Right Remix)" samples from the song "Treat 'Em Right" by Chubb Rock.

== Credits and personnel ==
Credits adapted from the Growing Pains liner notes.

- Mary J. Blige – vocals, writer
- André Bowman – bass
- Dwayne Dugger – horns
- Kuk Harrell – vocal producer
- Jaycen Joshua – mixing engineer
- James King – horns
- Alex Newell – additional recording
- Dave Pensado – mixing engineer
- Jazze Pha – producer, programming, writer
- Omar Phillip – persuccions
- Jaye Price – horns
- Omar Renya – recording assistance
- Tricky Stewart – producer, programming, writer
- The-Dream – writer
- Corey Williams – additional recording

== Charts ==
=== Weekly charts ===
Weekly chart performance for "Just Fine"
Chart (2007–2008)	Peak position
Canada Hot 100 (Billboard)	84
Euro Digital Songs (Billboard)	16
Japan (Japan Hot 100)	18
Netherlands (Dutch Top 40 Tipparade)	14
Scottish Singles Sales (Official Charts)	21
UK Singles (Official Charts)	16
UK Hip Hop/R&B (Official Charts)	2
US Billboard Hot 100	22
US Dance Club Songs (Billboard)	1
US Dance Airplay (Billboard)	6
US Hot R&B/Hip-Hop Songs (Billboard)	3
US Rhythmic Airplay (Billboard)	35

=== Year-end charts ===
Year-end chart performance for "Just Fine"
Chart (2008)	Position
UK Singles (OCC)	156
UK Urban (Music Week)	7
US Billboard Hot 100	82
US Dance Club Songs (Billboard)	45
US Hot R&B/Hip-Hop Songs (Billboard)	3

== Certifications ==
Certifications for "Just Fine"
Region	Certification	Certified units/sales
New Zealand (RMNZ)	Gold	15,000^{‡}
United Kingdom (BPI)	Silver	200,000^{‡}
^{‡} Sales+streaming figures based on certification alone.

== Release history ==
Release dates and formats for "Just Fine"
Region	Date	Format(s)	Version(s)	Label(s)	Ref.
United States	October 16, 2007	Rhythmic contemporary radio	Original	Geffen	
United Kingdom	January 28, 2008	CD	Original	Geffen	
United States	February 19, 2008	Digital download	Treat 'Em Right Remix	Geffen	
