= Hurt Again =

Promotional single by Mary J. Blige

from the album Growing Pains
- Released: March 4, 2008 (airplay)
- Recorded: 2007
- Studio: Matriarch Studios, Los Angeles; Studio 609, Philadelphia
- Genre: Soul
- Length: 4:07
- Label: Matriarch; Geffen; Interscope
- Songwriters: Mary J. Blige; Andre Harris; Vidal Davis; Brian Sledge
- Producer: Dre & Vidal

"Hurt Again" is a song by Mary J. Blige, that was intended to be the third single from her eighth studio album, Growing Pains, but was canceled in favor of "Stay Down". The song was produced by Dre & Vidal, and co-written by Dr. Dre collaborator Brian Sledge. The song was released on March 4, 2008 for airplay, but never was given an official release as it was canceled as a single.

Blige and her band also performed this song in the One Life to Live soap opera in February 2008. She said about this appearance:

It's absolutely amazing to be integrated into a soap opera I've watched since I was a little girl. I performed on the show two years ago and had a ball, and I am beyond thrilled to be welcomed back again.

== Charts ==
Chart (2007–2008)	Peak position
US Hot R&B/Hip-Hop Songs (Billboard)	55
