= Work That (Mary J. Blige song) =

Single by Mary J. Blige

from the album Growing Pains
- Released: December 18, 2007
- Length: 3:27
- Label: Geffen
- Songwriters: Mary J. Blige; Theron Feemster; Sean Garrett
- Producers: Neff-U; Sean Garrett

Mary J. Blige singles chronology
"Just Fine" (2007)	"Work That" (2007)	"Stay Down" (2008)

"Work That" is a song by American singer Mary J. Blige. It was written by Blige, Sean Garrett, and Theron "Neff-U" Feemster for her eighth studio album, Growing Pains (2007), while production was overseen by the latter, with Garrett also credited as a co-producer. A self-love promoting rap pop track, which draw from Blige's own journey to towards self-acceptance, "Work That" has the singer stressing to young women everywhere to embrace their individuality and love who they are.

The song was released by Geffen Records as the album's second single and sent to US urban radio stations on December 18, 2007. A remix featuring rapper Busta Rhymes was also released to radio. The song peaked at number 65 on the US Billboard Hot 100 and became a top 20 hit on the Hot R&B/Hip-Hop Songs chart, reaching number 16. In 2019 and 2020, "Work That" received additional exposure after United States senator Kamala Harris selected it as the campaign song for her presidential campaign.

== Background ==
"Work That" was written by Blige along with Sean Garrett, and Theron "Neff-U" Feemster for her eighth studio album, Growing Pains (2007). Production on the song was overseen by Feemster, while Garrett was credited as a co-producer. On August 7, 2008, it was revealed that Blige was facing a US$2 million federal suit claiming that while Feemster wrote the music for "Work That", it was actually owned by Dream Family Entertainment since Feemster had created the music while he was under contract with the company. The filing claimed that Dream Family never gave rights to use the song to Blige, Feemster or her label Geffen Records.

== Promotion ==
In 2007, "Work That" was featured in an Apple Inc. commercial, promoting both the company's portable media player iPod as well as their media player iTunes. In 2019 and 2020, "Work That" received additional exposure after United States senator Kamala Harris selected it as the campaign song for her presidential campaign. Harris frequently used it as a walkout song, including her victory speech after being elected vice president in the 2020 United States presidential election. Blige commented on the usage of her song: "I was buggin', I was so surprised because people was calling me, I didn't know what the hell was going on [...] It was a song that I wrote from my heart. I didn’t know she was a fan. She didn’t even pick "Just Fine," she picked "Work That" [...] which only the fans know. So, I would say, thank you, Kamala."

== Critical reception ==
"Work That" received mixed to positive reviews from music critics. Brennan Carley, writing for Spin called the song a "factory-made rap-pop track," while Aldin Vaziri San Francisco Chronicle noted that "Work That" was "not just a catchy iPod jingle but an earnest feminist anthem." In a review of Growing Pains, Talia Kraines from BBC Music wrote: "While nothing quite lives up to the dancefloor groove of 2001's "Family Affair", "Work That" shows she's lost none of her empowering emotion when creating a dance beat." In another review of the song's parent album, Peter Hayward from musicOMH noted that "Work That" was "a fine opening track. 'Making the most of what she’s got,' Mary sounds assured and confident stridently empowered song." BET.com wrote of the song: "Another Oprah-style affirmation anthem from Growing Pains, this triumpant song features an updated Mary sound, complete with a G-Unit-esque, piano-driven beat and a surprisingly painless incorporation of Auto-Tune."

== Commercial performance ==
"Work That" was the top debut on the US Hot R&B/Hip-Hop Songs chart in the week of December 13, 2007, coming in at number 43. It marked Blige's 50th appearance on the tally and her best debut in four years. It eventually peaked at mumber 16 on the chart. Elsewhere, "Work That" reached number 65 on the Billboard Hot 100 as well as number ten on the Dance Singles Sales chart.

== Track listings ==
CD single
No.	Title	Writer(s)	Producer(s)	Length
1.	"Work That"	Mary J. Blige; Theron Feemster; Sean Garrett	Feemster; Garrett^{[a]}	3:27
2.	"Work That" (featuring Busta Rhymes)	Blige; Feemster; Garrett; Trevor Smith, Jr.	Feemster; Garrett^{[a]}	3:49

Notes

- ^{^[a]} denotes co-producer(s)

== Credits and personnel ==
Credits adapted from the Growing Pains liner notes.

- Mary J. Blige – vocals, writer
- Danny Cheung – vocal recording
- Theron Feemster – instruments, producer, writer
- Sean Garrett – additional vocals, co-producer, writer
- Kuk Harrell – vocal recording
- Jaycen Joshua – mixing engineer
- Chris O'Ryan – additional engineering
- Dave Pensado – mixing engineer

== Charts ==
=== Weekly charts ===
Weekly chart performance for "Work That"
Chart (2007–2008)	Peak position
US Billboard Hot 100	65
US Dance Singles Sales (Billboard)	10
US Hot R&B/Hip-Hop Songs (Billboard)	16

=== Year-end charts ===
Year-end chart performance for "Work That"
Chart (2008)	Position
US Hot R&B/Hip-Hop Songs (Billboard)	65
