= Growing Pains (Mary J. Blige album) =

2007 studio album by Mary J. Blige

Studio album by Mary J. Blige
- Released: December 18, 2007
- Recorded: 2006–2007
- Genre: R&B
- Length: 64:53
- Label: Geffen
- Producers: Dejion; Bryan-Michael Cox; Dre & Vidal; Ron "Neff-U" Feemster; Sean Garrett; Charles Harmony; Eric Hudson; Ne-Yo; The Neptunes; Jazze Pha; Stargate; Syience; Tricky Stewart

Mary J. Blige chronology
The Breakthrough (2005)	Growing Pains (2007)	Stronger with Each Tear (2009)

Singles from Growing Pains
- 1. "Just Fine" Released: October 16, 2007; 2. "Work That" Released: December 18, 2007; 3. "Stay Down" Released: March 18, 2008

Growing Pains is the eighth studio album by American singer-songwriter Mary J. Blige, released on December 18, 2007 by Geffen Records. An R&B album, it debuted at number 2 on the Billboard 200, selling 629,000 copies in its first week, before climbing to number one in January 2008. Growing Pains was certified Platinum by the RIAA.

"Just Fine" debuted as the lead single on October 16, 2007, peaking at number 22 on the Billboard Hot 100. "Work That" was released as the second single on December 18, 2007. Both songs hit the top 20 of the Billboard Hot R&B/Hip-Hop Songs. The third single, "Stay Down," reached the top 40 on the R&B chart.

Growing Pains was noted for its lighter tone in comparison to Blige's previous releases. A critical success, Growing Pains ranked at number 29 on Rolling Stone's list of the Top 50 Albums of 2007, and won Best Contemporary R&B Album at the 51st Grammy Awards in February 2009.

== Background ==
In an interview for Blues & Soul, Blige explained the significance of the album's title, stating:

I started writing the record right after that whole gigantic day I had at the Grammies last year. So it was important to me to get across to my fans that whole feeling I was going through of 'How do I sustain this breakthrough? How do I continue to remind myself I'm in a better place?'... And the only way to continue to stay in that place is to GROW! I believe the majority of people out there, if something uncomfortable is going on in their lives, are forced to either go back to where they were, or to GROW – and that that tension is called PAIN. So the light, happy songs on the album are celebrating my growth. While the less poppy, darker tracks represent the places I'm forced to grow out of. So in that way the title represents the growth, as well as the understanding that – in order for anything to develop – it has to have some kinda tension behind it.

— Mary J. Blige

== Singles ==
"Just Fine" was released as the album's lead single on October 16, 2007. It was the only single from the album which was released in multiple formats. In the US, the song peaked at number 22 on the Billboard Hot 100, number 3 on the Hot R&B/Hip-Hop Songs chart, and reached number 82 on the 2008 year-end chart. In the UK, the song performed well, peaking at number 16 on the official chart. According to producer Jazze Pha, Mary was adamant about "Just Fine" being released first: "This is my single. This is what I need. I’m feeling happy."

"Work That" was released as the album's second single on December 18, 2007. The single charted from digital downloads when the album came out, peaking at number 65 on the Billboard Hot 100, and was a top 20 hit on Hot R&B/Hip-Hop Songs.

"Hurt Again" was intended to be the official third single from Growing Pains, but at the last minute was changed in the favor of "Stay Down". Between the loss of momentum from the album's first and second singles, and lack of promotion, "Stay Down" did not chart on the Billboard Hot 100 chart, but peaked at number 34 on Hot R&B/Hip-Hop Songs.

== Composition ==
Growing Pains has a notably lighter sound than some of Mary's previous albums. Album collaborator Jazze Pha shared Mary's intention for this artistic choice: “She talked about how people always want her to be depressed Mary. She wanted to let people know that she wasn’t somewhere around here crying. At that time, she was happy. She was alright, living life.” Slant Magazine writer Eric Henderson called the album a "collection of affirmations, self-definitions, and keepin’-it-real-isms." AllMusic editor Marisa Brown dubbed Growing Pains as "a mature, polished, and utterly professional set of well-crafted songs", noting that "the album takes an even greater step toward pop".

Album opener and second single, "Work That," is about self-confidence and being yourself. Track three and lead single, "Just Fine," is a dance-influenced song with cheerful synths and "rosy" lyrics. Eighties synths appear in "Feel Like a Woman," track four. "Stay Down," track five and the final single, drew comparisons to an earlier Blige song, "Be Without You." A Philadelphia soul sound makes up track six, "Hurt Again." Rated R&B said track seven, the Usher duet "Shake Down," has "colorfully eccentric production." Slant Magazine called "Till the Morning," track eight, a "party anthem." The "anti-love song" ninth track, "Roses," has "floating synths" and "unsettling beats." A "Chic-y" bass and a "string-laden climax" define track 10, "Fade Away." Track 13, "Talk to Me," features a "bluesy" sample. Track 14, "If You Love Me?," has "beautiful" piano instrumentation, handclaps, and whispers of "yes" throughout the song. "Smoke," track 15, sees an "aching" Blige singing over a "fragile" piano and live drumming.

Blige's vocal performance on the album was noted for its melisma qualities. The "regal" album cover shows a "confident" Blige with a bob haircut and large gold earrings.

== Critical reception ==
Professional ratings
Aggregate scores
Source	Rating
Metacritic	77/100
Review scores
Source	Rating
AllMusic	4/5 stars
The A.V. Club	B+
The Guardian	4/5 stars
The Independent	2/5 stars
MSN Music (Consumer Guide)	A−
NME	3.5/5 stars
PopMatters	8/10
Rolling Stone	3.5/5 stars
Slant Magazine	3/5 stars
USA Today	3/4 stars

Growing Pains received positive reviews from most music critics. At Metacritic, which assigns a normalized rating out of 100 to reviews from mainstream critics, the album received an average score of 77, based on 17 reviews, which indicates "generally favorable reviews". Alex Macpherson of The Guardian complimented its themes of Blige's "past and present", while citing the track "Roses" as "one of the best songs of her career". NME commented that it "finds Blige on chirpier form".

Michael Arceneaux of PopMatters complimented Blige's "cheerful demeanor" on the album and called it "a good addition to the Mary J. Blige catalogue". USA Today's Edna Gundersen wrote that "Her vulnerability and vocal prowess are undeniable, and resistance melts away as her voice [...] commands and communicates with startling clarity". Steven Hyden of The A.V. Club commended Blige for "reaching beyond the relative stability of her personal life and playing up the vulnerable everywoman persona that's long resonated with her female fanbase". BBC Online's Talia Kraines commended Blige for "keeping it real" and complimented her "empowering emotion".

However, Andy Gill of The Independent commented that "it's hard to tell whether the whiplash snares and crisp handclap grooves [...] are suited to [Blige's] needs here" and criticized "Blige's capitulation to R&B cliché, with all women downtrodden and all men culpable, and a corrosively bling-driven worldview". Slant Magazine's Eric Henderson wrote that "what's both most compelling and most limiting about Blige's Growing Pains: She keeps her most salable characteristic, her emotiveness, under duress, which provides tension but no release". Alfred Soto of The Village Voice noted "no more drama, but plenty of (occasionally excellent) melodrama", adding that "as her acting chops diminish, her command over plush, slightly jagged contempo R&B improves".

Writing for Rolling Stone, critic Robert Christgau commented that "the tone of her confessions has changed with her music", stating "Growing Pains is an edgier record than The Breakthrough, but Blige has definitely lost or just outgrown the brassy urgency of her twenties". In his consumer guide for MSN Music, Christgau described the album as "an expensive, honorable, credible sampler of the hottest current R&B brands", and gave it an A− rating.

=== Accolades ===
In 2008, at the 50th Grammy Awards, "Just Fine" was nominated in the 'Best Female R&B Vocal Performance' category, losing the award to Alicia Keys' "No One". At the 2009 51st Grammy Awards it was nominated for Best Contemporary R&B Album and Just Fine was nominated for Best Remixed Recording, Non-Classical. The album won Best Contemporary R&B Album.

== Commercial performance ==
Growing Pains sold 629,000 copies in its first week and debuted at number two on the U.S. Billboard 200 chart. In its second week the album climbed to number one on the Billboard 200 with 204,000 copies sold. By December 2009 the album sold 1.6 million copies in the US.

In the UK, the album entered the charts at number 6, making it her highest-charting album there since No More Drama in 2001 with first week sales of 21,755. In Germany, the album was her worst one charting, peaking number 48 and staying on the German Albums Chart for only 3 weeks. As of March 27, 2010, the album had sold over 81,681 copies in the UK.

== Track listing ==
Growing Pains – standard edition
No.	Title	Writer(s)	Producer(s)	Length
1.	"Work That"	Blige; Theron Feemster; Sean Garrett	Feemster; Garrett^{[A]}	3:30
2.	"Grown Woman" (featuring Ludacris)	Blige; Dejion Madison; Christopher Bridges; Terius Nash	Dejion	4:05
3.	"Just Fine"	Blige; Nash; Christopher Stewart; Phalon Alexander	Stewart; Pha; Kuk Harrell^{[B]}	4:02
4.	"Feel Like a Woman"	Blige; Feemster; Nash	Feemster	4:02
5.	"Stay Down"	Blige; Johnta Austin; Bryan-Michael Cox	Cox	4:22
6.	"Hurt Again"	Blige; Andre Harris; Vidal Davis; Brian Sledge	Dre & Vidal	4:07
7.	"Shake Down" (featuring Usher)	Blige; Nash; Stewart; Alexander	Stewart; Pha; Harrell^{[B]}	3:36
8.	"Till the Morning"	Pharrell Williams	The Neptunes	4:17
9.	"Roses"	Blige; Nash; Stewart	Stewart; Harrell^{[B]}	4:35
10.	"Fade Away"	Blige; Shaffer Smith; Mikkel S. Eriksen; Tor Erik Hermansen	Stargate; Ne-Yo^{[A]}	4:15
11.	"What Love Is"	Blige; Smith; Eriksen; Hermansen	Stargate; Ne-Yo^{[A]}	4:03
12.	"Work in Progress (Growing Pains)"	Smith; Charles Harmon	Chuck Harmony; Ne-Yo^{[A]}	4:00
13.	"Talk to Me"	Blige; Austin; Eric Hudson; Robert Wright; Verdine White	Hudson	4:09
14.	"If You Love Me?"	Blige; Austin; Cox	Cox	3:39
15.	"Smoke"	Smith; Reggie Perry	Syience; Ne-Yo^{[A]}	3:10
16.	"Come to Me (Peace)"	Blige; Nash; Harrell; Stewart	Stewart; Harrell^{[B]}	5:01
Total length:				64:53

Growing Pains – UK and Japanese editions
No.	Title	Writer(s)	Producer(s)	Length
9.	"Nowhere Fast" (bonus track)	Blige; Nash; Stewart; Alexander	Stewart; Pha; Harrell^{[B]}	3:46
10.	"Roses"	Blige; Nash; Stewart	Stewart; Harrell^{[B]}	4:35
11.	"Fade Away"	Blige; Ne-Yo; Eriksen; Hermansen	Stargate; Ne-Yo^{[A]}	4:15
12.	"What Love Is"	Blige; Smith; Eriksen; Hermansen	Stargate; Ne-Yo^{[A]}	4:03
13.	"Work in Progress (Growing Pains)"	Smith; Harmony	Harmony; Ne-Yo^{[A]}	4:00
14.	"Talk to Me"	Blige; Austin; Hudson; Wright; White	Hudson	4:09
15.	"If You Love Me?"	Blige; Austin; Cox	Cox	3:39
16.	"Smoke"	Smith; Reggie Perry	Syience; Ne-Yo^{[A]}	3:10
17.	"Come to Me (Peace)"	Blige; Nash; Harrell; Stewart	Stewart; Harrell^{[B]}	5:01
18.	"Hello It's Me" (bonus track)	Todd Rundgren	Mark Ronson	4:07
19.	"Mirror" (featuring Eve; bonus track)	Blige; Nash; Stewart; Harrell; Eve Jeffers	Stewart; Harrell^{[B]}	3:54
Total length:				76:34

Growing Pains – Japanese bonus track
No.	Title	Writer(s)	Producer(s)	Length
20.	"Sleep Walkin'"	Blige; Stewart	Stewart; Harrell^{[B]}	4:24
Total length:				80:58

iTunes edition bonus tracks
No.	Title	Writer(s)	Producer(s)	Length
17.	"Nowhere Fast" (featuring Brook Lynn)	Blige; Nash; Stewart; Alexander	Stewart; Pha; Harrell^{[B]}	3:46
18.	"Hello It's Me"	Todd Rundgren	Mark Ronson	4:07
19.	"Mirror" (featuring Eve)	Blige; Nash; Stewart; Harrell; Eve Jeffers	Stewart; Harrell^{[B]}	3:54
20.	"Just Fine" (remix; featuring Lil Mama)	Blige; Nash; Stewart; Alexander	Stewart; Pha; Harrell^{[B]}	4:47

iTunes UK edition bonus tracks
No.	Title	Writer(s)	Producer(s)	Length
17.	"Nowhere Fast" (featuring Brook Lynn)	Blige; Nash; Stewart; Alexander	Stewart; Pha; Harrell^{[B]}	3:46
18.	"Hello It's Me"	Todd Rundgren	Mark Ronson	4:07
19.	"Mirror" (featuring Eve)	Blige; Nash; Stewart; Harrell; Eve Jeffers	Stewart; Harrell^{[B]}	3:54
20.	"Just Fine" (Moto Blanco Vox Remix)	Blige; Nash; Stewart; Alexander	Moto Blanco	3:46

Notes and sample credits

- ^{^[A]} denotes co-producer
- ^{^[B]} denotes vocal producer
- "Talk to Me" contains a sample from "Key to My Heart", written by Robert Wright and Verdine White, and performed by the Emotions.

== Personnel ==
Credits for Growing Pains adapted from AllMusic.

- Judi Acosta-Stewart – production coordination
- Nick Banns – assistant
- Lee Blaske – strings
- Mary J. Blige – executive producer
- Jesse Bond – guitar
- Andre Bowman – bass
- Dru Castro – engineer
- Danny Cheung "Stems" – vocal engineer
- Andrew Coleman – engineer
- Bryan-Michael Cox – musician, producer
- Vidal Davis – producer
- Patrick Dillett – vocal engineer
- The-Dream – vocals
- Duane Dugger – horn
- Mikkel Storleer Eriksen – engineer
- Ron Fair – string arrangements, string conductor
- Theron "Neff U" Feemster – musician, producer
- Drew FitzGerald – creative director
- Brian "Big Bass" Gardener – mastering
- Sean Garrett – producer, vocals
- Chuck Harmony – engineer, musician, producer
- Kuk Harrell – vocal engineer, vocal producer
- Andre Harris – producer
- Mike Hogue – assistant
- Curtis Hudson – engineer
- Eric Hudson – engineer, musician, producer
- Kendu Isaacs – management, vocal engineer
- Jaycen Joshua – mixing
- Jazze Pha – drum programming, keyboards, producer
- Kim Kimble – hair stylist
- James King – horn
- Markus Klinko – photography
- Andrea Liberman – stylist
- DeJion Madison – producer
- Ne-Yo – producer
- The Neptunes – producer
- Alec Newell – engineer
- Chris "TEK" O'Ryan – engineer
- Dave Pensado – mixing
- Omar Phillips – percussion
- Justin Pintar – assistant
- Haye Price – horn
- Omar Reyna – assistant
- Christopher "Tricky" Stewart – drum Programming, keyboards, mixing supervision, producer
- Supa Engineer "Duro" – mixing
- Sam Thomas – engineer
- Pat Thrall – overdub engineer, post production engineer
- Corey Williams – engineer
- Andrew Wuepper – assistant

== Charts ==
=== Weekly charts ===
Weekly chart performance for Growing Pains
Chart (2008)	Peak position
Australian Albums (ARIA)	146
Australian Urban Albums (ARIA)	12
Austrian Albums (Ö3 Austria)	36
Belgian Albums (Ultratop Flanders)	58
Belgian Albums (Ultratop Wallonia)	98
Dutch Albums (Album Top 100)	31
French Albums (SNEP)	73
German Albums (Offizielle Top 100)	32
Irish Albums (IRMA)	47
Italian Albums (FIMI)	44
Japanese Albums (Oricon)	22
Norwegian Albums (VG-lista)	38
Scottish Albums (Official Charts)	20
Swedish Albums (Sverigetopplistan)	6
Swiss Albums (Schweizer Hitparade)	6
Taiwanese Albums (Five Music)	11
UK Albums (Official Charts)	6
UK R&B Albums (Official Charts)	1
US Billboard 200	1
US Top R&B/Hip-Hop Albums (Billboard)	1

=== Year-end charts ===
Year-end chart performance for Growing Pains
Chart (2008)	Position
US Billboard 200	12
US Top R&B/Hip-Hop Albums (Billboard)	3

== Certifications ==
Certifications for Growing Pains
Region	Certification	Certified units/sales
United Kingdom (BPI)	Silver	81,681
United States (RIAA)	Platinum	1,600,000

== Release history ==
Release history for Growing Pains
Region	Date	Format	Label(s)
Canada	November 9, 2007	Digital download; CD; DVD	Matriarch; Geffen
United States	December 18, 2007	Digital download; CD; DVD	Matriarch; Geffen
United Kingdom	February 4, 2008	Digital download; CD; DVD	Matriarch; Geffen
Brazil	February 15, 2008	Digital download; CD; DVD	Matriarch; Geffen
Japan	April 28, 2008	Digital download; CD; DVD	Matriarch; Geffen
