= Children in Need 2009 =

British TV series or program

- Genre: Telethon
- Presented by: Terry Wogan; Tess Daly; Alesha Dixon
- Narrated by: Alan Dedicoat
- Country of origin: United Kingdom
- Original language: English

Production
- Production location: BBC Television Centre
- Camera setup: Multiple
- Running time: 180 mins (Part 1); 205 mins (Part 2)

Original release
- Network: BBC One
- Release: 20 November – 21 November 2009

Related
- Children in Need 2008; Children in Need 2010; Around the World in 80 Days (Children in Need 2009)

Children in Need 2009 was a campaign held in the United Kingdom to raise money for Children in Need. It culminated in a live broadcast on BBC One which began on the evening of Friday 20 November and ran through to the morning of Saturday 21 November. The broadcast was hosted by Terry Wogan, Tess Daly and Alesha Dixon. Alan Dedicoat read out the running totals and Peter André reported from the BT Tower. The show was broadcast from BBC Television Centre in London. Dancing Pudseys were projected on to the building. The 2009 event raised £20,309,747 by the end of the broadcast, slightly under the previous year's total of £20,991,216.

== Television campaign ==
=== Artist performances ===
- Alesha Dixon opened the show with a performance of her single "The Boy Does Nothing", accompanied by the dancers from Strictly Come Dancing
- Peter Kay premiered the official single for Children in Need 2009, titled "The Official BBC Children in Need Medley".
- The X Factor 2008 runners-up JLS performed "Everybody in Love"
- John Barrowman performed a cover version of "Old Time Rock and Roll" in his boxers which he then signed and auctioned with all proceeds going to the cause.
- Taylor Swift performed "Love Story" before donating £13,000 towards the cause
- Westlife performed a cover version of "What About Now"
- Pixie Lott opened the second half of the show by performing her song "Boys and Girls"
- Justin Lee Collins performed a cover version of "Delilah"
- Gray O'Brien performed All I Care About from the musical Chicago
- Alesha Dixon performed "To Love Again"
- Harry Connick, Jr. performed "Just The Way You Are"
- David Gray and Annie Lennox performed a duet of Gray's upcoming single Full Steam
- Spandau Ballet performed their song "True"
- Madness performed a cover version of "It Must Be Love"
- Peter André performed "Unconditional"
- Paolo Nutini performed "Pencil Full of Lead" from Glasgow
- The Nolans performed a medley of songs including "Holding Out for a Hero", "It's Raining Men" and "I'm In the Mood for Dancing"
- Sugababes performed "About a Girl" from Belfast
- Paloma Faith performed "Stone Cold Sober"
- Stereophonics performed "Innocent" from Cardiff
- Ronan Keating performed "Homeward Bound" from Belfast
- Highlights from Belfast were shown, including Escala, Tinchy Stryder and N-Dubz
- Highlights from Cardiff were shown, including Bonnie Tyler and Only Men Aloud!
- Alison Moyet performed "Love Letters"
- Little Boots performed "Remedy" from Glasgow
- Robbie Williams performed "Bodies" and "You Know Me" from Reality Killed The Video Star

=== Cast performances ===
- The cast of Hollyoaks performed a Queen tribute
- The presenters and reporters from The One Show performed a Fame tribute
- The cast of The Bill performed "Mack the Knife"
- The cast of EastEnders performed a Motown tribute, which was shown twice during the broadcast. The tribute included covers of "Dancing in the Street", "Get Ready", "ABC" and "Ain't No Mountain High Enough"
- Carol Vorderman performed a Pop-rap tribute, which was shown twice during the broadcast. The tribute included covers of "Me Myself and I", "Doin' the Do", "Gone Till November" and "Last Night"
- Four female BBC Newsreaders (Sophie Raworth, Fiona Bruce, Susanna Reid and Kate Silverton) performed a medley of Beyoncé Knowles songs including "Crazy in Love" and "Single Ladies (Put a Ring on It)". They were then joined by four male newsreaders (Charlie Stayt, Ben Brown, Bill Turnbull and Nicholas Owen) for a dance off against Diversity. During the second half of the television broadcast a behind the scenes video was shown of the rehearsals before a repeat of the dance itself
- The cast of Legally Blonde performed a selection of songs from the musical
- The cast of Priscilla Queen of the Desert - the Musical performed a selection of songs from the musical
- The cast of Jersey Boys performed a selection of songs from the musical
- The cast of Avenue Q performed a special version of "The Money Song" from the musical

=== Others ===
Title	Description	Starring
Walk on the Wild Side	A special version of the show.	Standard cast
Merlin	A special version of the show.	Standard Cast
"All You Need Is Love" by Bandaged Together	A group of celebrities perform a cover version	
Doctor Who	A preview of the 2009 Christmas Special called "The End of Time", was shown during both parts of the telethon	David Tennant
Casualty	Mini episode featuring Pudsey as a patient	Standard Cast
Dragons' Den	A special episode saw the Dragons performing a makeover of a community centre	The Dragons
Lark Rise to Candleford	A mini episode featuring a guest performance by Terry Wogan was shown in both halves of the television broadcast	Terry Wogan and Standard Cast
The Impressions Show	A live sketch in which Jon Culshaw and Debra Stephenson impersonated Wogan and Daly.	Jon Culshaw, Debra Stephenson, Terry Wogan and Tess Daly
Agatha Christie's Poirot	Mini-episode featuring David Suchet as Hercule Poirot hunting for a kidnapped Pudsey Bear	David Suchet
Taggart and Rebus	Joined forces for a one-off mini-episode	Standard Casts

=== Celebrity Mastermind ===
During the break for the BBC News at Ten on BBC One, BBC Two broadcast a special edition of Mastermind with comedians Lucy Porter, Mark Watson, Dave Spikey and Stephen K. Amos as contestants. Lucy Porter was the eventual winner, with a Celebrity Mastermind record score of 35 points.

=== Around the World in 80 Days ===
As a prequel to the main televised event, a weekly television series began airing on 13 October 2009, where various celebrities attempted to travel around the world in 80 days without using air travel.

=== Children in Need Rocks the Royal Albert Hall ===
Held on 12 November, Children in Need Rocks the Royal Albert Hall was an evening of live music in London's Royal Albert Hall, organised by Gary Barlow. The concert included sets by Sir Paul McCartney, Cheryl Cole, Katherine Jenkins, Julian Lloyd Webber, Leona Lewis, Robbie Williams, Lily Allen, MIKA, Dizzee Rascal, Muse, Dame Shirley Bassey, Snow Patrol and Take That, and was hosted by Chris Moyles. The event raised over two million pounds for the campaign. The event climaxed with all the artists collaborating onstage to perform "Hey Jude", by The Beatles.

== Regional Opt-Outs ==
Every BBC English Region hosted their own event with coverage throughout the telethon. BBC Wales, BBC Scotland and BBC Northern Ireland hosted their own opt out telethons alongside the main one in London

The locations were:

- BBC East - Bedfordshire at Millbrook Proving Ground
- BBC East Midlands - Leicester at the National Space Centre
- BBC London - London - Outside BBC Television Centre
- BBC North East and Cumbria - Hartlepool at Hartlepool Maritime Experience
- BBC North West - Ellesmere Port at Blue Planet Aquarium
- BBC South - Hampshire at the National Motor Museum
- BBC South East - Eastbourne at Drusillas Zoo Park
- BBC South West - Weymouth at The Sea Life Aquarium
- BBC West - Bristol at The Broadcasting House
- BBC West Midlands - Birmingham at Millenium Point
- BBC Yorkshire - Halifax at Eureka! The National Children's Museum
- BBC Yorkshire and Lincolnshire -

- BBC Wales - Cardiff at Wales Millennium Centre
- BBC Northern Ireland - Belfast at The Kings Hall
- BBC Scotland - Glasgow at BBC Pacific Quay

== Mascots ==
Pudsey Bear returned in the same style as has been seen since 2007. A new female character, Blush, was introduced. She is shyer than Pudsey, and wears a bow with the 2007 onwards Pudsey pattern.

=== Pudsey Bear lights up the BT Tower ===
Pudsey appeared at the top of the BT Tower in London on a giant 360-degree LED display. Pudsey popped up every half-hour, (between 07.00 - midnight) on 19 and 20 November.

== Official single ==
Peter Kay co-ordinated the official single, following his work for Comic Relief. He worked with the cooperation of stars from some of the most popular children's television shows from around the world. The song is a mash-up of many pop songs throughout the years including; "Can You Feel It", "Don't Stop", "Jai Ho (You Are My Destiny)", "Tubthumping", "Never Forget", "Hey Jude" and "One Day Like This". The song reached #1 on the UK Singles Chart.

== Other activities ==
As in previous years, the TV show Countryfile sold a calendar in aid of the appeal. In 2009, it raised £750,000.

== Totals ==
The following are totals with the times they were announced on the televised show.

Date	Time	Total
20 November 2009	20:01 GMT	£4,867,517
20 November 2009	21:00 GMT	£8,903,757
20 November 2009	21:55 GMT	£12,691,312
20 November 2009	22:40 GMT	£15,069,028
20 November 2009	23:26 GMT	£15,989,864
21 November 2009	00:04 GMT	£16,839,024
21 November 2009	01:04 GMT	£18,845,469
21 November 2009	01:56 GMT	£20,309,747

== See also ==
- Children in Need
- Pudsey Bear
