= Let's Get Excited =

2009 single by Alesha Dixon

Single by Alesha Dixon

from the album The Alesha Show
- Released: 11 May 2009
- Recorded: Studio-Atlantis, Los Angeles
- Genre: Electro-R&B
- Length: 3:18
- Label: Asylum
- Songwriters: Alesha Dixon; Thaddis Harrell; Sean Hall; Todd Herfinda
- Producer: RedZone

Alesha Dixon singles chronology
"Breathe Slow" (2009)	"Let's Get Excited" (2009)	"To Love Again" (2009)

"Let's Get Excited" is a song performed by British singer-songwriter Alesha Dixon. It is the third single from her second studio album, The Alesha Show, released by Asylum Records. The song was added to BBC Radio 1's A-List. The single was the second single taken from "The Alesha Show" in most countries.

== Background ==
"Let's Get Excited" was written by Dixon, Kuk Harrell, Sean Hall and Todd Herfinda and is an up-tempo dance track. After writing with Dixon, Harrell and Sean K produced the song on behalf of RedZone Entertainment, the company which he is managed by. Harrell was also the song's vocal producer and engineer.

Lyrically, the song namechecks Madonna, and makes a reference to "Into the Groove", a 1985 Madonna song. Dixon later stated that "Growing up Madonna was my idol and I loved dressing up like her and so she has definitely been a big influence on my career".

== Promotion ==
Alesha performed the song live at the following events:

- The Nokia Green Room - 19 December 2008
- The Feelgood Factor - 23 February 2009
- Let's Dance for Comic Relief - 14 March 2009
- The Paul O'Grady Show - 5 May 2009
- Tonight's the Night - 9 May 2009
- Radio 1's Big Weekend - 10 May 2009
- Guinness World Records Smashed - 10 May 2009
- Loose Women - 14 May 2009

== Music video ==
Dixon dancing in the music video of her single.

The video, directed by Max & Dania was shot in three days, starting on 26 March 2009.

The video took place in East London and is set in a nightclub surrounded by many dancers. Dixon is wearing black leggings and gold shoes and has her hair in a high-black ponytail. The entire video is set in the club but there is a variety of different looks and scenes going on. Near the end of the video everyone in the club is soaked with hoses.

The video was televised on Tuesday 7 April on 4Music at 7:00 pm, and on terrestrial TV on Wednesday 8 April on Channel 4 at 00:05AM. The video premiered, along with the single cover on Dixon's website on 8 April 2009.

== Reception ==
Digital Spy

Give the past eight years of Alesha Dixon's career a dusting over and it's clear she's experienced more highs and lows than your average day out at Thorpe Park. However, over the past six months she's been unstoppable - largely because she's released exactly the right songs from her Alesha Show album. Catching our attention with the novelty-ish 'The Boy Does Nothing', she followed it up by showcasing her thoughtful side on 'Breathe Slow'. Now she's back and pulling her finest trick out from under her sleeve. Just in time (hopefully) for summer, 'Let's Get Excited' is a perfect slice of exuberant electro R&B that's sure to fill the dancefloor after a day spent lounging on the beach. With a ridiculously catchy chorus punctuated by a classic Dixon "hey hey hey", it's topped off with one of the year's most genius lyrics so far: "I'm so excited - I'm a detective I'm all over you." Just begging to be played at full volume across the land, this is further evidence that Alesha Dixon is fast becoming a bit of a national treasure.

== Track listing ==
- UK CD single / UK 2-Track Promo CD
1. "Let's Get Excited (Redzone Radio Mix)"
2. "Let's Get Excited (Album Version)"
- UK Maxi Single (Exclusive to Dixon's website, featuring a fold-out poster)
1. "Let's Get Excited (Album Version)"
2. "Let's Get Excited (Redzone Radio Mix)"
3. "Let's Get Excited (Guena LG Glam As You Club Mix)"
4. "Let's Get Excited (Guena LG Glam As You Dub Mix)"
5. "Let's Get Excited (Blame Remix)"
- UK 7-Track Promo CD
1. "Let's Get Excited (Guena LG Remix)"
2. "Let's Get Excited (Guena LG Remix) [Edit]"
3. "Let's Get Excited (Blame Remix)"
4. "Let's Get Excited (Blame Remix) [Edit]"
5. "Let's Get Excited (Redzone Radio Mix)"
6. "Let's Get Excited (Redzone Instrumental)"
7. "Let's Get Excited (Album Version)"
- UK Digital Download
1. "Let's Get Excited (Redzone Radio Mix)"
- UK iTunes Digital EP
1. "Let's Get Excited (Redzone Radio Mix)"
2. "Let's Get Excited (Guena LG Glam As You Club Mix)"
3. "Let's Get Excited (Blame Remix)"
4. "Let's Get Excited (Blame Instrumental)"

== Credits and personnel ==
- Vocals: Alesha Dixon
- Audio mixing: Phil Tan
- Guitar: Tim Cansfield
- Producer: Kuk Harrell, Sean K
- Engineer: Kuk Harrell
- Recording studio: Sarm West Studios, London, UK and Studio-Atlantis, Los Angeles, US

== Charts ==
=== Weekly charts ===
Weekly chart performance for "Let's Get Excited"
Chart (2009–2010)	Peak position
Finland (Suomen virallinen lista)	14
Hungary (Rádiós Top 40)	8
Ireland (IRMA)	36
Scotland Singles (OCC)	7
Slovakia Airplay (ČNS IFPI)	90
UK Singles (OCC)	13
UK Singles Downloads (OCC)	13

=== Year-end charts ===
2009 year-end performance for "Let's Get Excited"
Chart (2009)	Position
Hungary (Rádiós Top 40)	85
UK Singles (OCC)	174

2010 year-end performance for "Let's Get Excited"
Chart (2010)	Position
Hungary (Rádiós Top 40)	65

== Release history ==
Release dates and formats for "Let's Get Excited"
Region	Date	Format(s)	Label(s)	Ref(s).
United Kingdom	11 May 2009	CD single; maxi single; digital download	Asylum	
Brazil	1 July 2009	Digital download	Warner Music	
