= The Alesha Show =

Studio album by Alesha Dixon
- Released: 24 November 2008
- Genres: R&B; soul; big band
- Length: 52:25
- Labels: Asylum; Atlantic
- Producers: Steve Booker; Sean "K." Hall; Kuk Harrell; Stephen Lipson; Harvey Mason, Jr.; Soulshock & Karlin; Al Shux; Trak Invaders; Xenomania

Alesha Dixon chronology
Fired Up (2008)	The Alesha Show (2008)	The Entertainer (2010)

Alternative cover
- International cover

Singles from The Alesha Show
- 1. "The Boy Does Nothing" Released: 10 November 2008; 2. "Breathe Slow" Released: 9 February 2009; 3. "Let's Get Excited" Released: 11 May 2009; 4. "To Love Again" Released: 15 November 2009

The Alesha Show is the second studio album by British singer Alesha Dixon. It was released by Asylum Records on 24 November 2008 in the United Kingdom. Her first album to be released domestically following the cancellation of her debut album Fired Up (2008), Dixon used her full name for the first time while releasing The Alesha Show after previously being credited mononymously. Producers on the album include Brian Higgins and Xenomania as well as Steve Booker, Harvey Mason, Jr., Kuk Harrell, Stephen Lipson, Soulshock & Karlin, Alex da Kid, and Al Shux.

The album debuted and peaked at number 11 on the UK Albums Chart and reached the top 30 in Finland and Spain. In the UK, it was eventually certified platinum by the British Phonographic Industry (BPI) for sales in excess of 300,000 units. The Alesha Show was preceded by the Xenomania-produced single "The Boy Does Nothing", which became a top ten and a gold-seller in the United Kingdom. A deluxe edition of the album, entitled The Alesha Show – Encore, was released on 23 November 2009. The first single from the Encore edition was "To Love Again". All the singles released from the album, including the Encore edition, reached the top 15 on the UK Singles Chart.

== Critical reception ==
Professional ratings
Aggregate scores
Source	Rating
Metacritic	68/100
Review scores
Source	Rating
AllMusic	3.5/5 stars
Digital Spy	3/5 stars
Dotmusic	7/10 stars
The Independent	3/5 stars
MusicOMH	4/5 stars
Orange	3/5 stars
Teentoday.co.uk	3/5 stars
The Times	3/5 stars

At Metacritic, which assigns a normalized rating out of 100 to reviews from mainstream critics, The Alesha Show has an average score of 68 based on 4 reviews, indicating "generally favorable reviews," Allmusic editor Jon O'Brien found that "the seven songs produced by the team behind Girls Aloud is full of exciting, hook-laden, spiky dance-pop [...] Much more inventive than expected, The Alesha Show cleverly manages to appeal to both the older Strictly crowd who revitalized her fortunes, and the younger Radio 1 crowd who supported her earlier girl-band days."

Alex Foster of the BBC praised Dixon on launching a well orchestrated comeback, saying "Modern celebrity is a fickle beast. After it chews you up and spits you out only a few are rewarded for their resilience with one more bite of the cherry". However, Foster continued onwards criticising Dixon's apparent genre change, stating "Is this the Britney of old? A rhymes-spitting, N.E.R.D video featuring, uniquely British R&B vixen that can ace rather than ape the Americans? The answer sadly is 'no'". However Foster did praise tracks such as "Breathe Slow" and "Hand It Over".

Nick Levine of Digital Spy stated that "Dixon tries her hand at everything from 60s glitz ('Cinderella Shoe') to synthy R&B ('Breathe Slow') to mellow ballads ('Don't Let Me Go'), managing more often that not to pull it off [...] Not unsurprisingly given its relentless genre-hopping, The Alesha Show does feature a few misfires. 'Ooh Baby I Like It Like That' sounds like a Dannii Minogue B-side from 2003". However, the review ended on an optimistic note, saying that "these quibbles aren't enough to sink an album that's often as lively and likable as the woman who made it".

== Commercial performance ==
The Alesha Show entered the UK Albums Chart at number twenty-six, selling over 26,000 copies. It dropped off the top 75 chart after four weeks. The album slowly climbed up the chart and, after the success of second single "Breathe Slow," it rose to a new peak of 12, giving the album its first top-twenty chart placing. Following the release of third single "Let's Get Excited", it rebounded to a new peak of 11. It also reached number seven on the UK Digital Albums. On 12 December 2008, The Alesha Show was certified gold by the British Phonographic Industry (BPI). On 22 July 2013, it gained platinum status, indicating sales in excess of 300,000 copies.

Elsewhere, The Alesha Show peaked at number 20 on the Scottish Albums Chart and entered the top 30 in Finland and Spain where it peaked at number 23 in both countries. It also entered the top 40 in France, reaching number 39.

== Promotion ==
=== Singles ===
- "The Boy Does Nothing" was released as the first single from the album. It became a worldwide hit and her best single to date. It became a top 5 hit in the United Kingdom. A top 10 hit in Australia, France, Norway, Italy, Romania, Greece, Spain, the Netherlands, Finland, Hungary, Sweden, and Switzerland. It also became at top 20 hit in Belgium, Ireland and Slovakia, as well as a top 40 hit in Austria, Denmark and Germany.
- "Breathe Slow" is the second single from the album. The track is Dixon's most successful single to date in the UK, peaking at number 3. The song was nominated at the BRIT awards 2010 in the Best British single category. It also became a top 20 hit in Belgium, the Czech Republic and Ireland.
- "Let's Get Excited" is the third single. It peaked at number 13 in the UK, number 14 in Finland, and number 36 in Ireland.
- "To Love Again" is the lead and only single from the Encore edition of the album. The song is produced by John Shanks and was written by Gary Barlow of Take That. The song peaked at number 15 in the United Kingdom and number 23 in Scotland.

=== Other songs ===
A promotional song called "Colours of the Rainbow" was made available to download from Dixon's official website.

=== Tour ===
In summer 2009 it was announced that Dixon would tour across the UK in support of The Alesha Show. Dixon named the 17 date concert tour "The Alesha Show". The tour is due to begin on 20 October in Nottingham and finish on 19 November in Brighton. Dixon had to reschedule three shows when it was announced that she would take on the role of judge on Strictly Come Dancing.

== Track listing ==
The Alesha Show – Standard edition
No.	Title	Writer(s)	Producer(s)	Length
1.	"Welcome to the Alesha Show"	Alesha Dixon; Marvin-Paul Ambrosius; Yann Macé	Trak Invaders	0:26
2.	"Let's Get Excited"	Dixon; Thaddis Harrell; Sean "K." Hall; Todd Herfindal	Hall; Harrell	3:18
3.	"Breathe Slow"	Carsten Schack; Kenneth Karlin; Johnnie V. Newt; Harold Lilly; Antonio Dixon	Soulshock & Karlin	4:13
4.	"Cinderella Shoe"	Dixon; Miranda Cooper; Brian Higgins; Carla Marie Williams; Nick Coler; Xenomania	Higgins; Xenomania	2:41
5.	"The Boy Does Nothing"	Dixon; Cooper; Higgins; Williams	Higgins; Xenomania	3:34
6.	"Chasing Ghosts"	Dixon; Steve Booker	Booker	3:43
7.	"Play Me"	Cooper; Dixon; Higgins; Jon Shave; Toby Scott; Jason Resch; Kieran Jones	Higgins; Xenomania	3:36
8.	"Hand It Over"	Dixon; Harvey Mason Jr.; Warren "Oak" Felder; James Fauntleroy II; Frankie Storm	Oak; Mason	3:35
9.	"Do You Know the Way It Feels"	Diane Warren	Steve Lipson	4:04
10.	"Can I Begin"	Dixon; Alexander Shuckburgh; Amanda Ghost; Ian Dench	Al Shux	3:32
11.	"Italians Do It Better"	Dixon; Cooper; Higgins; Resch; Jones	Higgins; Xenomania	4:10
12.	"Ooh Baby I Like It Like That"	Dixon; Cooper; Higgins; Sasha Collinson	Higgins; Xenomania	3:45
13.	"Don't Ever Let Me Go"	Dixon; Angus Stone; Julia Stone	Higgins; Xenomania	3:44
14.	"I'm Thru"/"Mystery to Me" (hidden track)	Cooper; Higgins; Matt Gray; Owen Parker; Dixon; Tim Powell	Higgins; Xenomania	8:56

The Alesha Show – International digital bundle 1 (bonus tracks)
No.	Title	Length
15.	"Breathe Slow" (Cahill radio edit)	3:31
16.	"The Boy Does Nothing" (Bimbo Jones remix radio edit)	2:42

The Alesha Show – International digital bundle 2 (bonus tracks)
No.	Title	Length
15.	"The Boy Does Nothing" (Fred Falke radio edit)	2:49
16.	"Breathe Slow" (Blackout Entertainment featuring Scottie B edit)	4:16

The Alesha Show – Digital deluxe edition (bonus tracks)
No.	Title	Length
15.	"I Don't Wanna Mess Around"	3:47
16.	"Welcome to the Alesha Show"	3:18

The Alesha Show – Japanese edition (bonus video)
No.	Title	Length
17.	"The Boy Does Nothing" (music video)	3:51

The Alesha Show – Enhanced CD edition (digital content)
No.	Title	Length
15.	"Welcome to the Alesha Show"	3:18
16.	"I Don't Wanna Mess Around"	3:47
17.	"The Boy Does Nothing" (music video)	3:51
18.	"The Boy Does Nothing" (Behind the Scenes)	3:36

The Alesha Show – iTunes Store deluxe edition (bonus video)
No.	Title	Length
19.	"Hello iTunes" (Thank You Video)	0:23

The Alesha Show – Encore (bonus tracks)
No.	Title	Writer(s)	Producer(s)	Length
14.	"I'm Thru"	Cooper; Higgins; Matt Gray; Owen Parker; Dixon; Tim Powell	Higgins; Xenomania	2:58
15.	"To Love Again"	Dixon; Gary Barlow; John Shanks	Barlow; Shanks; Higgins; Xenomania	3:51
16.	"Shake"	Dixon; Booker; Paloma Faith	Booker	3:30
17.	"The Light"	Dixon; Higgins; Cooper; Xenomania	Higgins; Xenomania	3:57
18.	"All Out of Tune"/"Mystery to Me" (hidden track)	Dixon; Alexander Grant; Cooper; Higgins; Powell	Alex da Kid	10:05

The Alesha Show – Encore – iTunes Store deluxe edition (bonus content)
No.	Title	Length
19.	"Welcome to the Alesha Show"	3:18
20.	"I Don't Wanna Mess Around"	3:47
21.	"The Boy Does Nothing" (music video)	3:51
22.	"Breathe Slow" (music video)	3:38
23.	"Let's Get Excited" (music video)	3:20
24.	"To Love Again" (music video)	3:46

== Charts ==
=== Weekly charts ===
Weekly chart performance for The Alesha Show
Chart (2008)	Peak position
Belgian Albums (Ultratop Flanders)	60
Dutch Albums (Album Top 100)	80
Finnish Albums (Suomen virallinen lista)	23
French Albums (SNEP)	39
Irish Albums (IRMA)	64
Scottish Albums (Official Charts)	20
Spanish Albums (Promusicae)	23
Swiss Albums (Schweizer Hitparade)	69
UK Albums (Official Charts)	11
UK Album Downloads (Official Charts)	7

=== Year-end charts ===
2008 year-end chart performance for The Alesha Show
Chart (2008)	Position
UK Albums (OCC)	181

2009 year-end chart performance for The Alesha Show
Chart (2009)	Position
UK Albums (OCC)	59

== Certifications ==
Certifications for The Alesha Show
Region	Certification	Certified units/sales
United Kingdom (BPI)	Platinum	300,000^{*}
^{*} Sales figures based on certification alone.

== Release history ==
List of release dates, showing region, formats, label, editions, and reference
Region	Date	Format(s)	Label	Edition	Ref
United Kingdom	24 November 2008	CD; digital download	Asylum	Standard edition	
Ireland	24 November 2008	CD; digital download	Asylum	Standard edition	
Japan	21 January 2009	CD; digital download	Victor	Standard edition	
Europe	20 February 2009	CD; digital download	Warner Music	Standard edition	
Poland	23 March 2009	CD; digital download	Warner Music	Standard edition	
Brazil	23 April 2009	CD; digital download	Warner Music	Standard edition	
Spain	12 May 2009	CD; digital download	Warner Music	Standard edition	
Germany	29 May 2009	CD; digital download	Warner Music	Standard edition	
Austria	29 May 2009	CD; digital download	Warner Music	Standard edition	
Switzerland	29 May 2009	CD; digital download	Warner Music	Standard edition	
Australia	4 September 2009	CD; digital download	Warner Music	Standard edition	
United Kingdom	23 November 2009	CD; digital download	Asylum	Encore edition	
