= The Boy Does Nothing =

2008 single by Alesha Dixon

Single by Alesha Dixon

from the album The Alesha Show
- Released: 10 November 2008
- Genre: R&B; mambo; swing; jazz
- Length: 3:34
- Label: Asylum
- Songwriters: Alesha Dixon; Brian Higgins; Miranda Cooper; Carla Marie Williams
- Producer: Xenomania

Alesha Dixon singles chronology
"Knockdown" (2006)	"The Boy Does Nothing" (2008)	"Breathe Slow" (2009)

Music video
- "The Boy Does Nothing" on YouTube

"The Boy Does Nothing" is a song performed by British singer-songwriter Alesha Dixon. It is the lead single from her second studio album, The Alesha Show (2008). The song was written by Alesha along with the help of Brian Higgins, Miranda Cooper, Carla Marie Williams, and other members of Xenomania. The single was her first since 2006 after "Knockdown" was released in October of that year. It was also her first since signing with her new record label Asylum Records.

The song, described as being "the stand-out track" on The Alesha Show, received largely positive reviews and became a commercial success, charting within the top 10 on the majority charts it entered and entering the charts in over 20 different territories worldwide. The single was certified Gold in the United Kingdom and sold over 1 million copies worldwide. Dixon stated that despite the title "The Boy Does Nothing", the song is "not a male-bashing kind of record", explaining that "the lyrical content is just cheeky more than anything".

== Background ==
Dixon had worked with Brian Higgins, of Xenomania, on her previous single, "Knockdown", but it failed to enter the top 40 on the UK Singles Chart, resulting in Dixon being dropped by her record label, Polydor Records. In early 2007, still with no recording contract, Dixon received a phone call from Higgins, who asked if she would like to continue working together. Dixon stated, "The plan was to make the whole record with Brian without talking to any record labels, we were just going to wait until we had made something special and then approach people with a finished album." However Dixon's profile was raised when she signed up to compete in Strictly Come Dancing, which she eventually won. Soon afterwards, Dixon signed a deal with Asylum Records. "The Boy Does Nothing", by this time already written, was originally intended to be a jazz orientated track, but Dixon and Higgins decided to change the genre, incorporating mambo influences, due to her experience on Strictly Come Dancing. Dixon described the song as "a very tongue-in-cheek record" and Higgins likened the song to "bottled happiness".

== Music and lyrics ==
"The Boy Does Nothing" is a R&B-mambo song with an up-tempo beat consisting of 88 beats per minute. The original key is E♭ minor. The instruments used were the bass guitar, drums, guitar and the keyboard.

The lyrics focus on the men in Dixon's past relationships and their lazy attitudes. The chorus states her frustration with men not completing everyday housekeeping tasks; "Does he wash up? Never wash up/Does he clean up? No he never cleans up/Does he brush up? He never brushed up". In the final verse the lyrics state, "And if the man can't dance/He gets no second chance"; a reference to her refusal to date men if they cannot dance. In an interview Dixon explained in further detail about the lyric, saying "I have to be honest, I do like a man who can dance, but it's not a deal-breaker. It's nice if they can dance, but if they can't we'll just have to work on other areas!"

== Promotion ==
Dixon performed her single on the results show of Strictly Come Dancing on 19 October 2008, with the show's professional dancers, including her professional partner whilst on the show in 2007, Matthew Cutler. On 8 November, Dixon performed a 5-song set at London's G-A-Y Club. On 14 November, she presented and performed for Children in Need 2008. She presented at the beginning of the show in the BT Tower, monitoring the calls and donations, and later performed in the BBC Television Centre. On Saturday 13 December, Dixon sang at Miss World 2008, which is said to have been watched by over 2 billion people worldwide. She also performed at GMTV, and on 31 December 2008 she performed on the BBC as part of the New Year celebrations. On 20 February 2009 Dixon performed the single at Le Grand Journal on French TV to promote her single and album in France. Alesha promoted the album in Spain, performing "The Boy Does Nothing" on Operación Triunfo, a reality television show similar to Star Academy. She also performed on other Spanish television shows, such as El Hormiguero. In Australia, the song was used to promote the 2009 season of the Australian Dancing with the Stars and has since seen an Australian release, seeing regular radio play. On 20 November 2009, Dixon performed "The Boy Does Nothing" as the opener to Children in Need 2009, which she also co-hosted, alongside Terry Wogan and Strictly Come Dancing colleague Tess Daly.

== Critical reception ==
Nick Levine of Digital Spy gave the song 4/5 stars:

"The Boy Does Nothing", a song that bears more than a passing resemblance to "Mambo No. 5", is a smart choice of comeback single from Dixon. She could easily have wiggled her hips to its salsa-pop rhythms on Strictly, and the cheeky, lighthearted lyrics suit her personality. "If the man can't dance, he gets no second chance," she sings towards the end. On this evidence, Dixon has grabbed hers by the horns.

Pop Justice gave the song a positive review and rated the song 10/10 stars:

Starts off like "Mambo No. 5". Ends up like Perez Prado's "Guaglione". Has a brilliant "HEY!" bit in it. Has about 28 different hooks and catchy bits. Will appeal as much to Strictly Come Dancing viewers as it does to annoying self-appointed internet pop 'sophisticates' like us lot.

== Music video ==
The video for "The Boy Does Nothing" is directed by the art director from the film Moulin Rouge!, Michael Gracey, and Pete Commins. The choreography for the music video was created by Ashley Wallen.

The video, filmed in Tottenham Town Hall, takes place in a theatre style ballroom, where two children; one boy and one girl are spying from a balcony onto the stage below, with the gal worrying that they shouldn't be watching. Dixon is dancing on a stage wearing a yellow dress with six other girls dressed in pink. There are also around fifty other audience members, dressed in 1950s style clothing, dancing along as well enjoying the show. Towards the end of the video, everyone starts to sing the last lines of the songs a cappella, and various male dancers try to impress Dixon with their dancing while everyone repeats the verse "If the man can't dance, he gets no second chance".

"The Boy Does Nothing" was nominated in the 'best video' category at the 2009 MOBO Awards, however the award was given to "Single Ladies (Put a Ring on It)" by American singer Beyoncé.

== Chart performance ==
"The Boy Does Nothing" debuted at No. 84 on the UK Singles Chart. The single became her first solo single to reach the top 10, following a 76 spot jump from No. 84 to No. 8 on downloads alone, selling 27,683 copies. On 16 November 2008, "The Boy Does Nothing" had advanced to No. 5 on the chart after the physical release of the single. The song spent 16 weeks in the UK Top 40. On the Irish Singles Chart, the song peaked at No. 19 on 11 November 2008 and falling to No. 20 the following week.

On the Swedish Singles Top 60 the song debuted at No. 30, becoming her first ever chart appearance in Sweden. The following week, it jumped a further eight places to No. 22. On 12 February 2009 the song peaked at No. 11. "The Boy Does Nothing" debuted in the top twenty on the Finnish Singles Chart at No. 19. The following week, it jumped to the No. 5. It has now reached a peak of number No. 2. The single entered the French Single Charts at No. 2. In Spain, the song debuted at No. 35. It jumped in the following weeks to No. 16, but the massive success came when she performed live the single in Operación Triunfo, a famous talent show in Spain. After that performance "The Boy Does Nothing" jumped to No. 5, and peaked at No. 2 for three non-consecutive weeks. Finally it achieved 2× Platinum certification due to the 80,000 copies sold.

In the Netherlands, "The Boy Does Nothing" charted in the Dutch Top 40 28 February, at No. 35. The following week saw the chart rose to No. 26. The song continued to gain some popularity and gained more and more airplay, which resulted in a 12th place on the top 40. This fact means that "The Boy Does Nothing" became Dixon's first top-20 single in The Netherlands so far, after 3 attempts with Mis-Teeq which all peaked just outside the top-20. After 10 weeks the song peaked at a chart high of No. 17. The single was a major club and radio hit in Finland, charting No. 2, and spent eleven weeks at No. 1 in the Czech Republic.

In Australia, the song was a sleeper hit. It entered the Australian ARIA Singles Chart at number 43 on 3 August 2009. On 14 September, it peaked at number eight, where it stayed for one week, and spent a total of five weeks in the top ten. It peaked higher than Mis-Teeq's most successful Australian single "Scandalous", which reached No. 9 in June 2003. In the United States it has been released digitally via the iTunes site, it was released on 20 February 2009.

== Formats and track listings ==
- UK CD Single / UK Card Sleeve Promo CD
1. "The Boy Does Nothing" – 3:30
- UK Maxi CD Single
1. "The Boy Does Nothing" – 3:30
2. "The Boy Does Nothing" (Fred Falke Remix) – 6:39
3. "The Boy Does Nothing" (Crazy Cousinz Remix) – 4:21
4. "The Boy Does Nothing" (Video)
- German / European CD Single
1. "The Boy Does Nothing" – 3:30
2. "The Boy Does Nothing" (Fred Falke Remix) – 6:39
- UK 2-Track Promo CD [A]
1. "The Boy Does Nothing" (Fred Falke Remix) – 6:39
2. "The Boy Does Nothing" (Fred Falke Dub) – 6:37
- UK 2-Track Promo CD [B]
1. "The Boy Does Nothing" (Crazy Cousinz Remix) – 4:20
2. "The Boy Does Nothing" – 3:30
- UK 6-Track Promo CD
1. "The Boy Does Nothing" (Bimbo Jones Remix) – 5:33
2. "The Boy Does Nothing" (Fred Falke Remix) – 6:39
3. "The Boy Does Nothing" (Crazy Cousinz Remix) – 4:20
4. "The Boy Does Nothing" (Bimbo Jones Remix Radio Edit) – 2:42
5. "The Boy Does Nothing" (Fred Falke Dub) – 6:37
6. "The Boy Does Nothing" – 3:30
- French 5-Track Promo CD
1. "The Boy Does Nothing" – 3:30
2. "The Boy Does Nothing" (Fred Falke Remix) – 6:39
3. "The Boy Does Nothing" (Fred Falke Dub) – 6:37
4. "The Boy Does Nothing" (Crazy Cousinz Remix) – 4:20
5. "The Boy Does Nothing" (Acapella) – 3:30
- Digital Download / Swedish 4-Track Promo CD
1. "The Boy Does Nothing" – 3:30
2. "The Boy Does Nothing" (Bimbo Jones Remix Radio Edit) – 2:42
3. "The Boy Does Nothing" (Fred Falke Remix) – 6:39
4. "The Boy Does Nothing" (Crazy Cousinz Remix) – 4:20

== Credits and personnel ==
- Vocals: Alesha Dixon
- Audio mixing: Jeremy Wheatley
- Bass guitar: Kieran Jones
- Drums: Florrie Arnold
- Guitar: Nick Coler, Jason Resch
- Keyboards and programming: Tim Powell, Brian Higgins, Nick Coler, Matt Gray, Owen Parker, Gary Sanctuary
- Producer: Brian Higgins, Xenomania

== Charts ==
=== Weekly charts ===
Chart (2008–2009)	Peak position
Australia (ARIA)	8
Austria (Ö3 Austria Top 40)	34
Belgium (Ultratop 50 Flanders)	16
Belgium (Ultratop 50 Wallonia)	18
Czech Republic Airplay (ČNS IFPI)	1
Denmark (Tracklisten)	31
Europe (European Hot 100 Singles)	5
Finland (Suomen virallinen lista)	2
France (SNEP)	2
Germany (GfK)	40
Hungary (Rádiós Top 40)	1
Ireland (IRMA)	19
Italy (FIMI)	8
Japan (Japan Hot 100)	13
Netherlands (Dutch Top 40)	12
Netherlands (Single Top 100)	5
Norway (VG-lista)	3
Romania (Romanian Top 100)	8
Russia Airplay (TopHit)	71
Scottish Singles Sales (Official Charts)	3
Slovakia Airplay (ČNS IFPI)	16
Spain (Promusicae)	2
Spanish Airplay Chart	5
Sweden (Sverigetopplistan)	7
Switzerland (Schweizer Hitparade)	7
UK Singles (Official Charts)	5
UK Singles Downloads (Official Charts)	8

Chart (2017)	Peak position
Poland Airplay (ZPAV)	53

=== Year-end charts ===
Chart (2008)	Position
UK Singles Chart	48
Chart (2009)	Position
Australian Singles Chart	68
Belgian Singles Chart (Flanders)	77
Belgian Singles Chart (Wallonia)	78
Dutch Singles Chart	62
Dutch Single Top 100	64
Hungarian Airplay Chart	3
Italian Singles Chart	47
Spanish Singles Chart	12
Swedish Singles Chart	69
Swiss Singles Chart	35
UK Singles Chart	111

== Certifications ==
Certifications for "The Boy Does Nothing"
Region	Certification	Certified units/sales
Australia (ARIA)	Gold	35,000^{^}
Finland (Musiikkituottajat)	Gold	5,983
Spain (Promusicae)	2× Platinum	50,000^{*}
United Kingdom (BPI)	Platinum	600,000^{‡}
^{*} Sales figures based on certification alone.^{^} Shipments figures based on certification alone.^{‡} Sales+streaming figures based on certification alone.

== Release history ==
Country	Release date	Format	Label
United Kingdom	10 November 2008	CD Single, Maxi Single, Digital download	Asylum Records
Ireland	22 November 2008	CD Single, Maxi Single, Digital download	Asylum Records
Sweden	8 January 2009	Digital download	Warner Music
Norway	13 January 2009	Digital download	Warner Music
Finland	18 January 2009	CD Maxi, Digital download	Warner Music
Italy	6 February 2009	Digital download	Warner Music
Spain	16 February 2009	Digital download	Warner Music
United States	20 February 2009	Digital download	Warner Music
Brazil	18 March 2009	Radio, Digital download	Warner Music
Germany	24 April 2009	CD Single, Maxi Single, Digital download	Warner Music
