= Dingles Fairground Heritage Centre =

Museum in Devon, England

Dingles Fairground Museum
- Former name: Dingles Steam Village
- Established: 2003
- Location: Lifton, Devon, England, United Kingdom
- Coordinates: 50.655664°N 4.251279°W
- Website: https://www.dinglesfhc.co.uk/

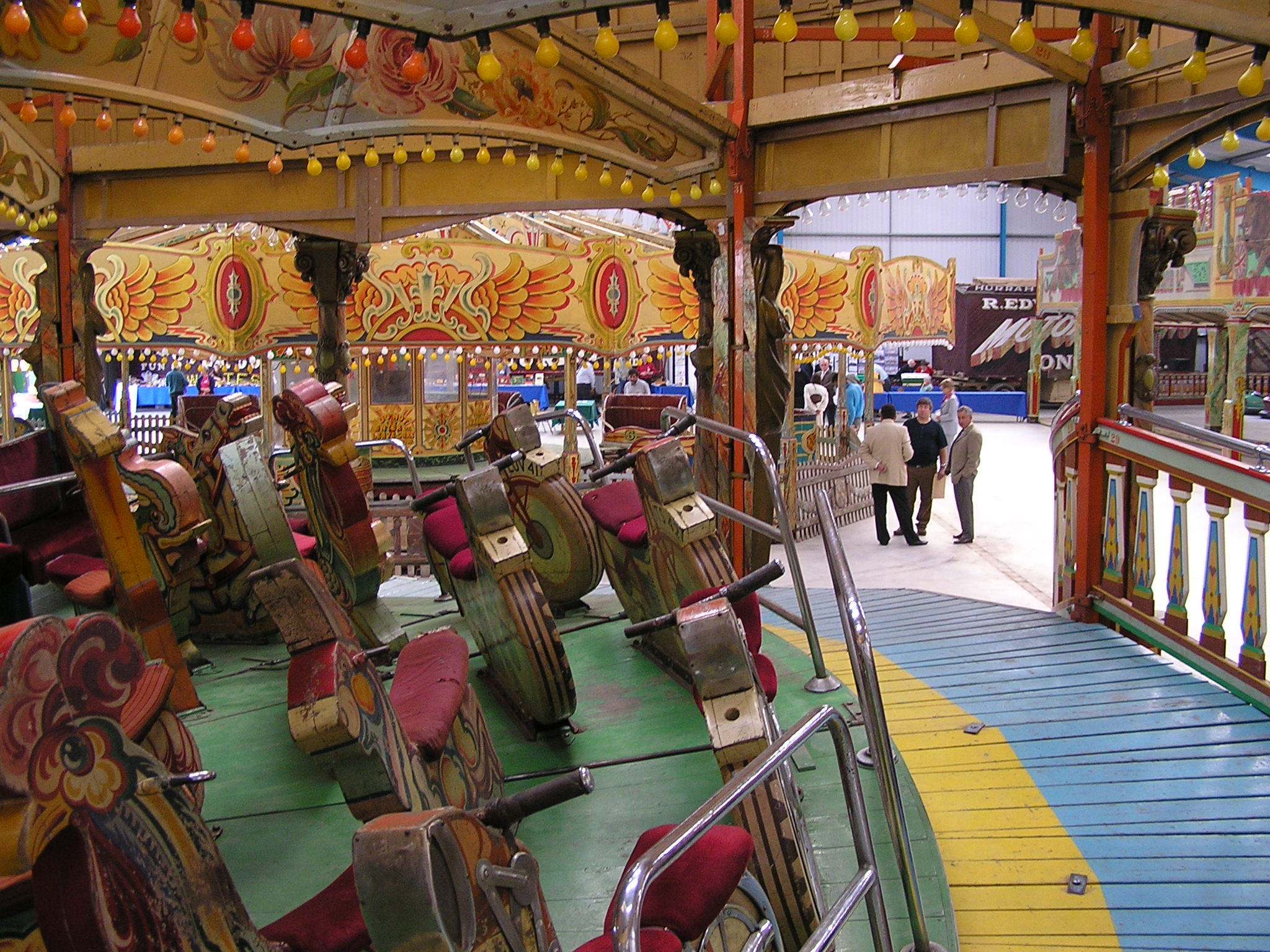
Edwards’ Super Chariot Racer at Dingles Fairground Heritage Centre, Lifton, Devon

Dingles Fairground Museum, formerly known as Dingles Steam Village and Fairground Heritage Centre, was a museum that featured a collection of historical fairground rides, equipment, and other memorabilia. Located in Lifton, Devon, United Kingdom, the museum was operated by a charity called the Fairground Heritage Trust and first opened to the public in 2003. The rides were restored and placed into operation for guests to experience, with many dating back to the early 20th century, complete with original artwork. The museum closed in November 2024.

== History ==
The Fairgrounds Heritage Trust charity was incorporated in 1986 with the goal of collecting and restoring historical funfair items, including rides, games, and artwork dating back to the 19th century. It opened the Dingles Steam Village museum at its present location in Lifton, Devon, in 2003. Following an expansion in 2006, the museum reopened in 2007 as Dingles Fairground Heritage Centre.

Rides, stall games, and artwork in the charity's collection were once featured in travelling funfairs. Rides were restored, and those that could be were returned to working order and placed in operation for visitors to ride. Attractions required tokens that guests purchased in addition to general admission. Notable rides in the vintage collection included a 1930s-era Edwards' Dodgems bumper car ride, a Joy Wheel featuring a spinning disc dating as far back as 1910, and a 1938 Shaw's Moonrocket thought to be the last of its kind in existence.

As a result of the COVID-19 pandemic, the museum closed in March 2020 and struggled financially without an income. Many items in the charity's collection were auctioned off to raise money, and through the auction they managed to raise £50,000. In November 2021, Fairground Heritage received an additional £70,000 from the government, which was part of a funding effort to aid museums and art galleries that struggled during the pandemic. The museum reopened in April 2022 with another expansion that was originally planned for 2021.

The museum permanently closed on 3 November 2024, with increasing costs, its remote location and the impact of COVID-19 being cited as three major factors in the decision. Much of the museum's collection is to be moved to the Statfold Narrow Gauge Museum in Tamworth, Staffordshire.
