= Snow Centre Manchester =

Indoor ski slope in Greater Manchester, England

Coordinates: 53.4674°N 2.3619°W

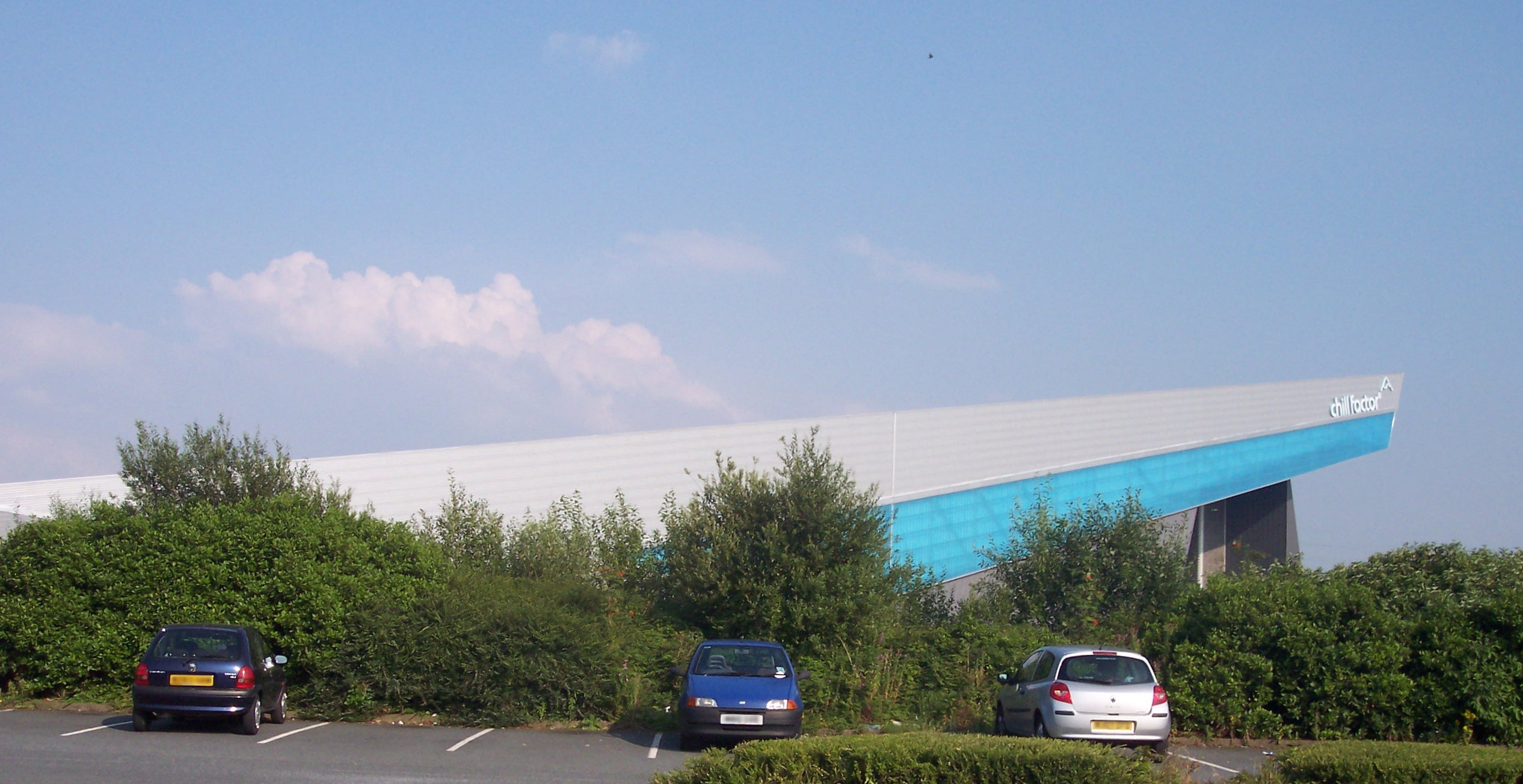
Outside view of the complex

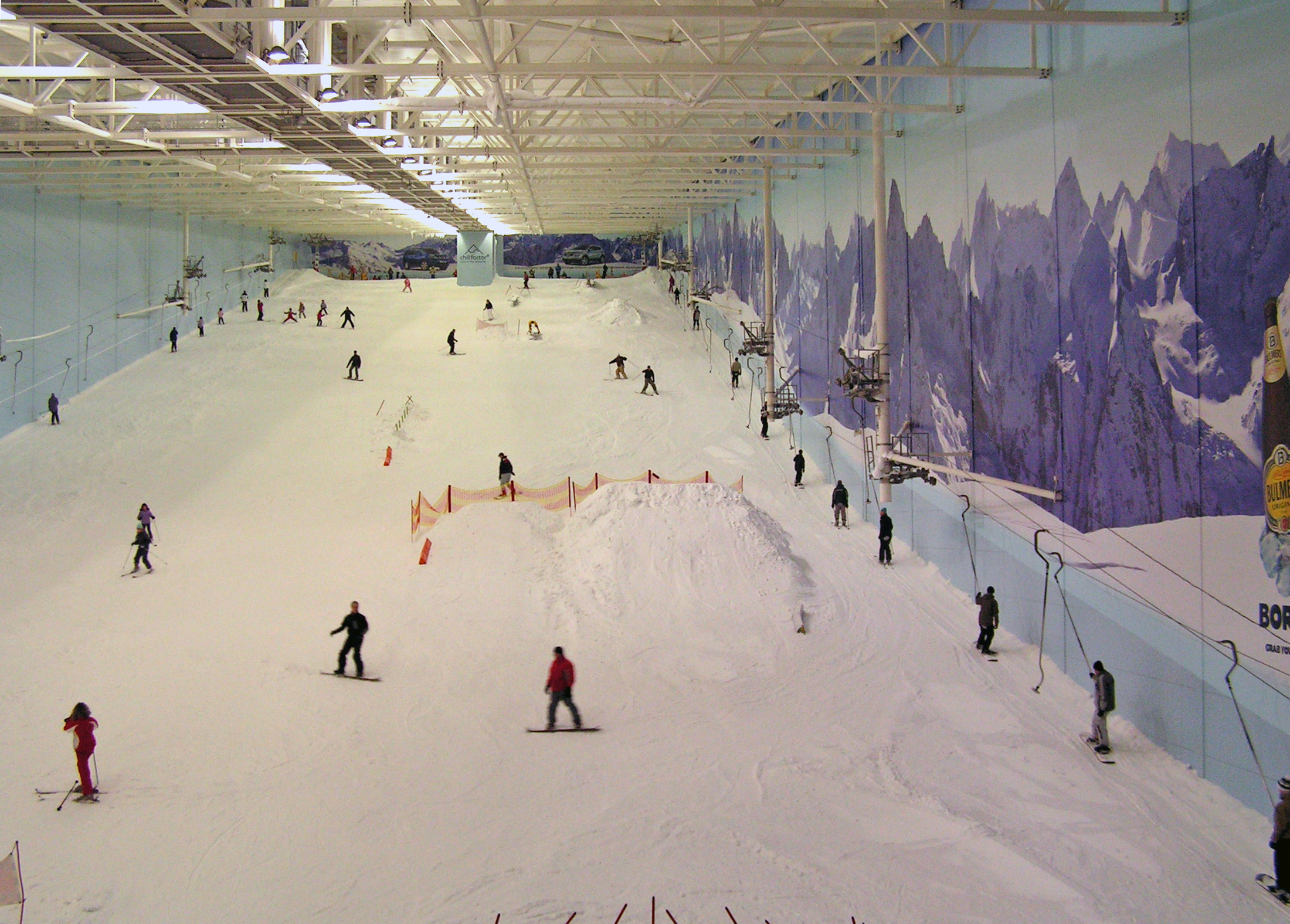
Overview of the main slope at Chill Factor^{e}.

The Snow Centre Manchester, formerly Chill Factorᵉ, is the UK's longest indoor ski slope; a £31 million real snow centre located in the Trafford Park area of Trafford, Greater Manchester, England. Designed by FaulknerBrowns Architects, the centre opened in November 2007, at which time it was the widest in the world, at 180 metres (590 ft) long and 100 metres (330 ft) wide at its widest point.

In 2010, the former sales and marketing director of Alton Towers Morwenna Angove joined Chill Factor^{e} as CEO.

In 2011, the Guinness World Record for the longest chain of skiers to travel 100 m (330 ft) without breaking, was recorded at Chill Factor^{e}.

In May 2011, Chill Factor^{e} hosted the UK's first Snowbombing event.

In 2018, Chill Factor^{e} rebranded as BEYOND, a new retail, experiential and leisure mix, which will bring additional restaurants and businesses to complement resident brands.

In March 2020, Chill Factor^{e} announced that its owners Extreme Cool Limited and U&I PLC had sold the company to Snow Centres Ltd who operate The Snow Centre in Hemel Hempstead. They also announced that the CEO Angove would be replaced by Ian Brown as managing director. Snow Centre took over at the end of March and spent £500,000 on renovations.

== Slope facilities ==
The main slope is served by two drag lifts suspended from the ceiling, thus widening the available piste area and allowing for easier maintenance of the slope. This differs from the other centres in the UK where the lift supports are on the piste. In addition to the main slope, the centre features a beginner slope, a luge track, and dedicated snow play and tubing areas. Other activities include airboarding, snowscoot and sledging.

== Alpine Street ==
The centre includes a number of shops and restaurants in a themed 'Alpine Village' area. On the upper level of the village is The Sports Bar, and The Lodge restaurant with slope side viewing balconies and conference/event facilities with a capacity of up to 250 people.
