= Kuk Harrell =

American songwriter and producer (born 1964)

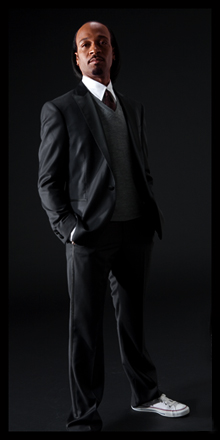
- Harrell in 2009

Background information
- Born: Thaddis Laphonia Harrell; December 30, 1964 (age 61)
- Genres: Pop; R&B; dance-pop; hip hop
- Occupations: Songwriter; vocal producer; arranger; audio engineer
- Years active: 1992–present

Thaddis Laphonia "Kuk" Harrell (/ˈkuːk həˈrɛl/ KOOK hə-REL) (born December 30, 1964) is an American songwriter, vocal producer, music arranger and audio engineer. He is known for his vocal production credits on several hit songs throughout the 2000s, often on productions by Christopher "Tricky" Stewart and Terius "The-Dream" Nash. In 2011, Harrell and Stewart joined the ranks of Fox's American Idol along with music mogul Jimmy Iovine, producing many of the songs performed by its contestants.

Harrell's vocal production credits include three Billboard Hot 100-number one singles: Rihanna's "Only Girl (In the World)" and her Grammy Award-winning "Umbrella", as well as Beyoncé's "Single Ladies (Put A Ring On It)". He vocal produced Mary J. Blige's album Growing Pains, which won the Best Contemporary R&B Album at the 2008 Grammy Awards. Its lead single, "Just Fine", was nominated for Best Female R&B Vocal Performance.

== Early years ==
Harrell's music career began in his native Chicago, where he performed as a drummer and a vocalist before becoming a session musician. He soon became a commercial writer and producer, working for Joy Art Music, contributing to major ad campaigns for McDonald's, Kraft, Coca-Cola and many others. After relocating to Los Angeles with his cousin, writing and production partner Laney Stewart in 1992, Harrell then added worship leader to his repertoire, and became a touring vocalist and choir director for Promise Keepers as well. During this time, he sang on tracks written and produced by Diane Warren and David Foster.

== Musical career ==
=== RedZone Entertainment ===
2004 brought Harrell to Atlanta, where he joined his cousins Tricky Stewart and Mark Stewart at RedZone Entertainment as a writer, producer, and engineer. RedZone Entertainment is an Atlanta-based, music-production entity, whose discography includes collaborations with many artists, producers, and composers of note, and is responsible for over 25 million records sold.

In a 2008 Billboard interview, Mark Stewart describes Kuk Harrell as "...the secret weapon."

He produces all the vocals as well as writes and produces. He's the silent partner and a major part of what we do on a creative basis.

2007 was a pivotal year for Harrell. Rihanna's "Good Girl Gone Bad" and Mary J. Blige's "Growing Pains" were released this year, both featuring his composition and vocal production skills. The single "Umbrella" off of "Good Girl Gone Bad" and "Just Fine" off of "Growing Pains" were both nominated for Grammys in 2007. This was also the year that Harrell established his own music production company, Suga Wuga Entertainment, an imprint of Interscope.

=== Rihanna, Good Girl Gone Bad / "Umbrella" ===
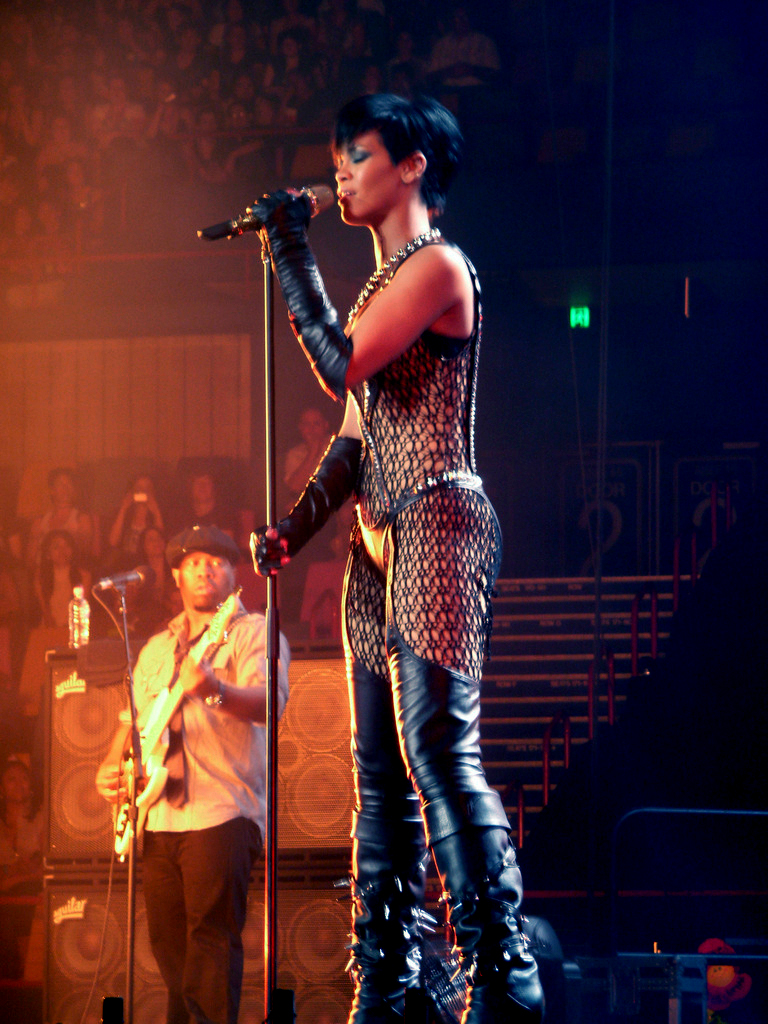
Rihanna performing in Brisbane, 2008

On March 29, 2007, the first single from Rihanna's Good Girl Gone Bad, "Umbrella", was released. Harrell co-wrote and produced the vocals on the track, which subsequently had one of the highest digital debuts in the United States since Nielsen SoundScan began tracking downloads in 2003. The song, which featured an introductory rap verse from rapper Jay-Z, won Harrell a Grammy for Best Rap/Song Collaboration, a Grammy nomination for Record of the Year, and a Grammy nomination for Song of the Year.

The song won ASCAP's Pop Music Award which honored "Umbrella" as one of the most performed pop songs of 2007, and was also nominated at the Teen Choice Awards for Choice Music: Single. Time magazine named "Umbrella" one of The 10 Best Songs of 2007, ranking it at No. 3. Writer for Time magazine, Josh Tyrandiel, cited Rihanna's vocal performance and special talent for vocal innuendo as the reason he declared it "The Sexiest Song of 2007." Umbrella was set at No. 2 at the Billboard Hot 100 year-end chart, behind Beyoncé's "Irreplaceable".

In the United Kingdom, "Umbrella" broke a record on the UK Singles Chart by debuting at number one on the chart based on digital sales alone, becoming Rihanna's first chart-topper in the country. During the single's fourth week on the chart, both the single and album topped the UK Singles Chart and UK Albums Chart. "Umbrella" eventually reached a total of ten weeks at number one on the UK Singles Chart, becoming the country's longest-running number-one single of the 21st century since 1994. Rihanna has become the seventh artist in the history of the UK Singles Chart to top the chart for ten straight weeks. By the end of 2007, "Umbrella" had sold 512,730 units, making it her biggest-selling single to date and the second biggest-selling single of 2007 in the United Kingdom. It has since been certified silver by the British Phonographic Industry on July 20, 2007.

"Umbrella" had a similar success throughout Europe, reaching number one in Ireland, Poland, Sweden, Belgium, Austria, Norway, Italy, Portugal, Romania, Germany and Spain.

The music video premiered on April 26, 2007, at Thisisrihanna.com, and was officially released on the iTunes Store on May 11, 2007, peaking at number one for a period eight weeks. On May 1, 2007, it received five nominations at the 2007 MTV Video Music Awards, including "Female Artist of the Year", "Video of the Year" and "Monster Single of the Year", going on to win the latter two.

"Good Girl Gone Bad Live" was nominated for a 2008 Grammy for "Best Long Form Music Video"

=== Mary J. Blige, Growing Pains / "Just Fine" ===
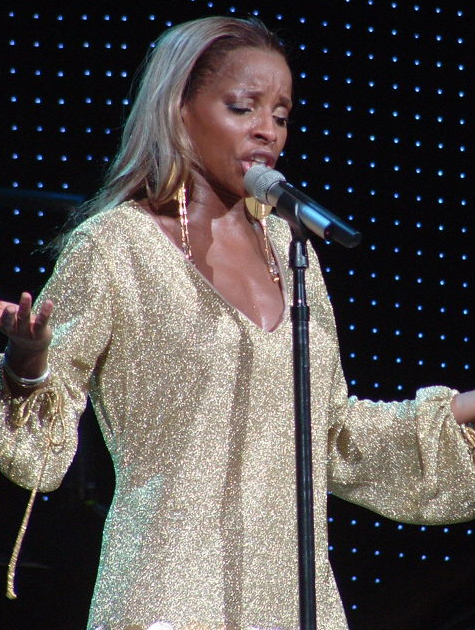
Mary J. Blige

The single "Just Fine" off of Mary J. Blige's Growing Pains was released in the U.S. on October 19, 2007. Harrell produced Blige's vocals on the track, which earned a Grammy nomination for Best Female R&B Vocal Performance. Harrell produced the majority of the vocals on the album, and co-wrote the song "Come To Me (Peace)".

Growing Pains has been certified 2× Platinum by RIAA and Gold by the BPI.

This single "Just Fine", was No. 41 on Rolling Stone's list of the 100 Best Songs of 2007. "Just Fine" received another Grammy nomination in 2008 for Best Remixed Recording, Non-Classical.

It was a successful chart single, peaking at No. 22 on the U.S. Billboard Hot 100 and No. 13 on the UK Singles Chart, while also topping the American Hot Dance Club Play chart. This single sold over 500,000 in the United States alone and over 700,000 worldwide making it eligible for Gold in the United States.

Growing Pains won the Grammy on Feb 8, 2009 for "Best Contemporary R&B Album".

In a 2009 interview, Harrell described working with Blige thusly:

"With Mary it's the same tedious grind work but it's always a pleasure because of how she approaches a project. She's always an open canvas ready to let you take her to the next level."

=== Chris Brown, Exclusive ===
Harrell produced Chris Brown's vocals and engineered on the song "You" from the 2007 release "Exclusive". The album was commercially successful, reaching number 4 on the U.S. Billboard 200 chart on its debut. It sold 295,000 units within a week of release. The album yielded three Billboard Hot 100 top five singles, and was successful in music markets, entering the top twenty of many charts worldwide. The album has earned platinum certification in the United States from the Recording Industry Association of America and has sold more than three million copies worldwide.

This album was No. 34 on Rolling Stone's list of the Top 50 Albums of 2007.

=== Celine Dion, Taking Chances ===
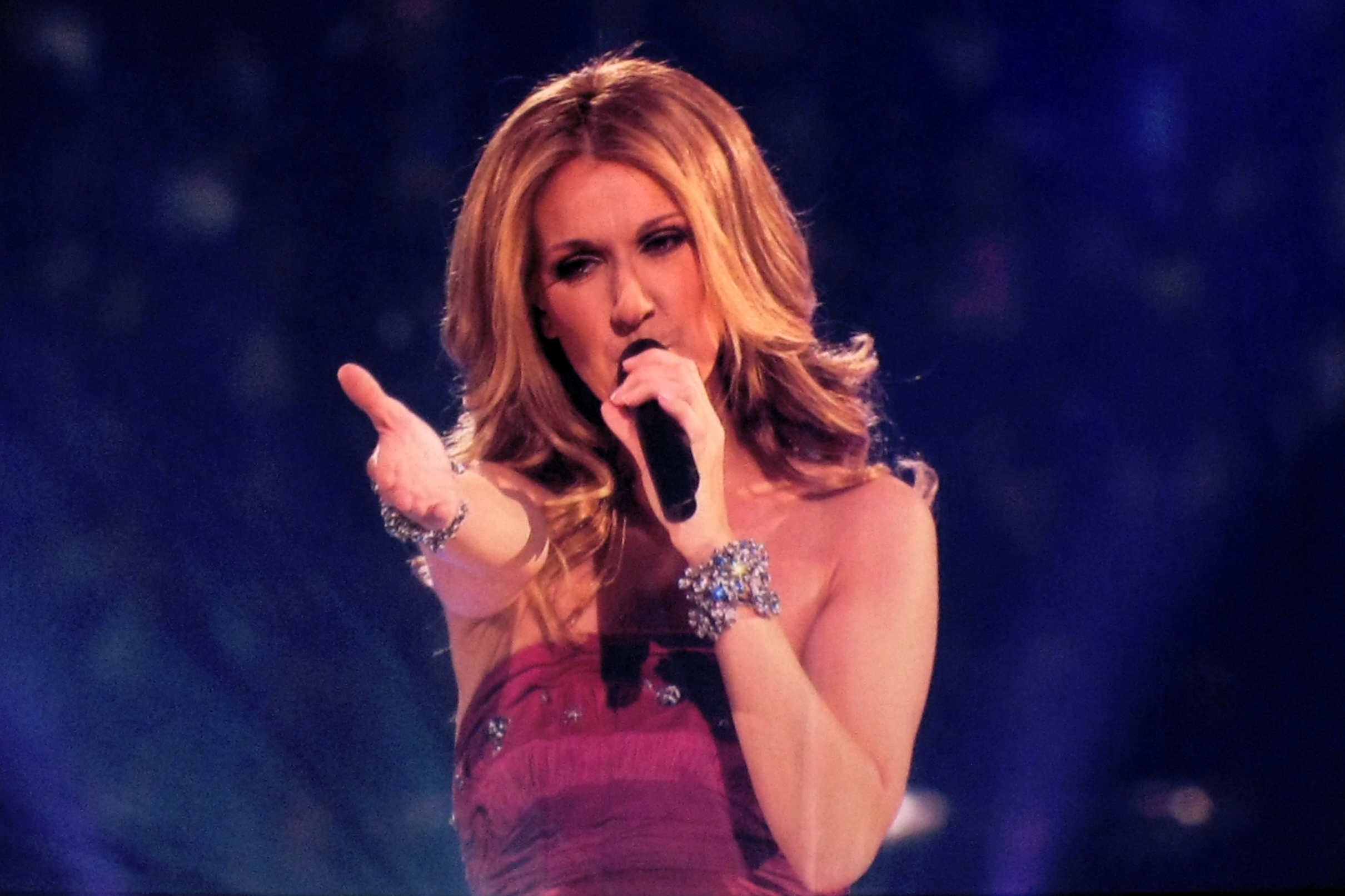
Celine Dion

Harrell is also a vocal producer and engineer on Celine Dion's release of November 7, 2007, "Taking Chances", and co-wrote the ballad "Skies of LA". According to IFPI, the album had shipped 3.1 million copies by the end of 2007, becoming the 19th best selling album that year with a November release. To date, it has sold 3,500,000 copies worldwide. It is certified gold in many countries, and platinum or multi-platinum in many others. Particularly successful in Canada, it reached number 1 on the chart with the biggest first week sales of 2007 (79,354). It also became the best-selling album in Canada that year (340,000 copies sold) and to date, has shipped 400,000 copies and is certified 4× platinum.

Taking Chances reached top 10 in many countries and is performing relatively well on the charts. In the United Kingdom, it sold about 365,000 copies and is certified platinum. In Japan, the album became Dion's biggest success since A New Day Has Come with 125,000 copies sold. In the United States it debuted at number 3 with sales of 214,556 copies and has sold over 1,000,000 copies to date and has been certified platinum.

=== The Dream, Love Hate / "I Luv Your Girl" ===
Harrell lent his engineering expertise to his production and writing partner "The-Dream" on the single "I Luv Your Girl" in 2007. Love Hate was the premiere project of RedZone's newly formed label Radio Killa/RedZone. It was released through Island/Def Jam, and "I Luv Your Girl" was the third single released off of the album.

The single, released on September 23, 2008, peaked at number 20 on the U.S. Billboard Hot 100, number 3, on U.S. Billboard Hot R&B/Hip-Hop Songs, number 40 on the U.S. Billboard Rhythmic Top 40, and number 58 on the U.S. Billboard Pop 100.

The album itself peaked on the U.S. Billboard 200 at number 30, and number 5 on the U.S. Billboard Top R&B/Hip-Hop Albums.

=== Jesse McCartney, Departure / "Leavin'" ===
Harrell produced the vocals on Jesse McCartney's "Leavin'", which was released on March 10, 2008. The song debuted at No. 14 on the Billboard Hot 100 making it McCartney's highest debut on the chart ever. In its second week, it rose to No. 10 becoming McCartney's biggest chart hit in the United States to date. It stayed at No. 10 for 3 non-consecutive weeks. The single peaked No. 1 on Billboard's Mainstream Top 40 chart. and the Billboard Pop 100 Airplay. "Leavin'" stayed in the top 20 on the Billboard Hot 100 for 20 weeks. The single was certified Platinum in the U.S., and was the most successful single from the album and of McCartney's career.

=== Usher, Here I Stand ===
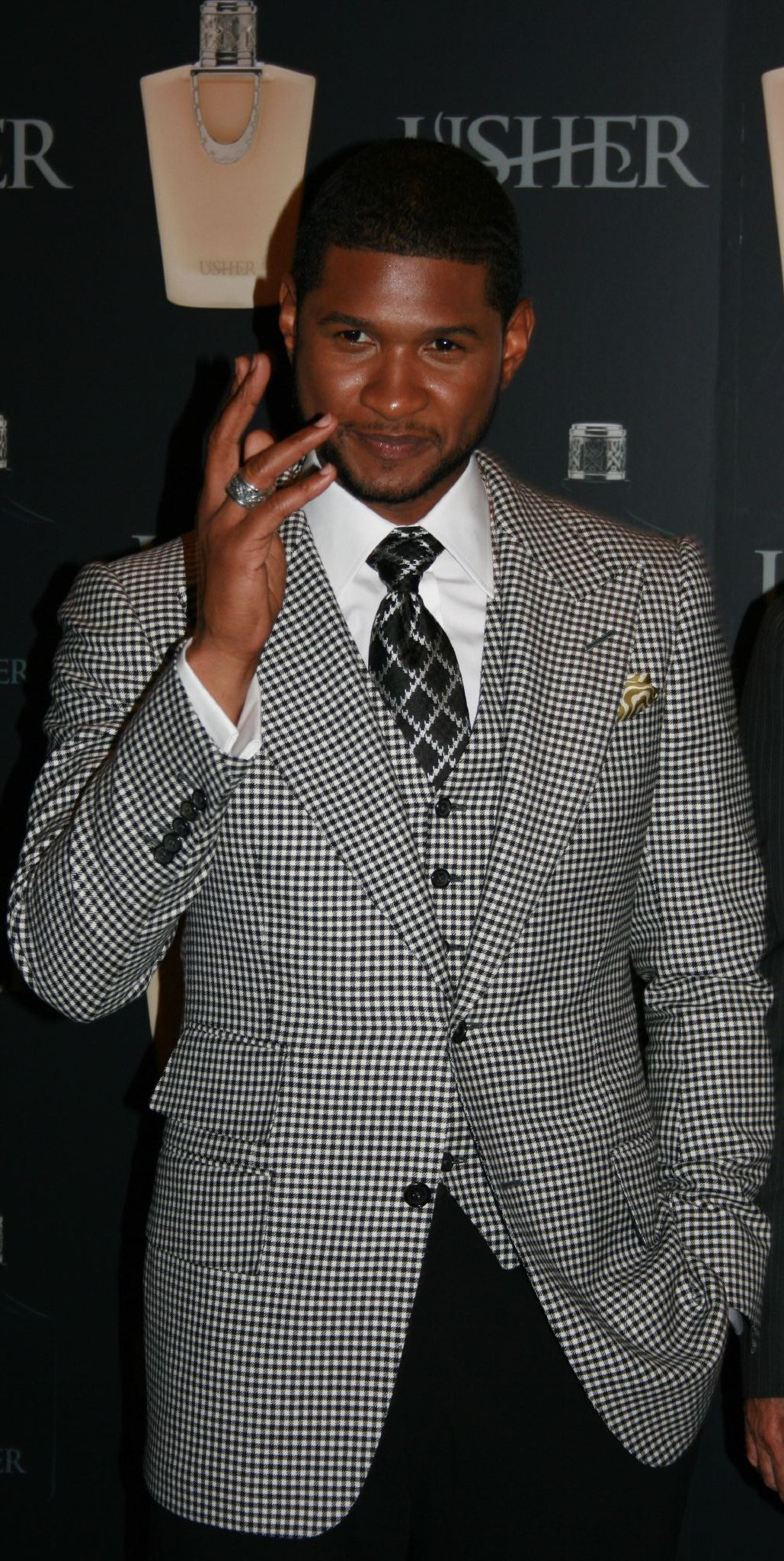
Usher in 2007

Harrell was heavily involved in Usher's 2008 release Here I Stand. He produced Usher's vocals on four of the tracks, and co-wrote "Moving Mountains". Here I Stand is Usher's fifth studio album, released on May 27, 2008, in the United States. Currently worldwide sales stand at almost 1.9 million copies.

According to building chart data, the album topped the Billboard 200, and achieved first week sales of 443,000. This made it the ninth largest album debut of the year 2008.

The second single from the album "Moving Mountains", was written and produced by Tricky Stewart, Kuk Harrell, and The-Dream. The song has since reached number 6 in New Zealand and the top 30 in Ireland, Sweden and on the UK Singles Chart. In the United States, "Moving Mountains" reached number 67 on the Billboard Hot 100.

The third single released on September 9, 2008, "Trading Places" has been even more successful on the U.S. Billboard charts than the previous single. It reached No. 5 on Billboard Hot R&B/Hip-Hop Songs and No. 45 on the Billboard Hot 100. Kuk Harrell produced Usher's vocals.

=== Beyoncé, I am... Sasha Fierce / "Single Ladies (Put A Ring On It)" ===
I Am… Sasha Fierce is the third solo studio album by American R&B singer Beyoncé Knowles, released on November 18, 2008, in the United States.

The album debuted at number one on the Billboard 200, making it Knowles' third consecutive number-one album. I Am… Sasha Fierce is ranked number two on Entertainment Weekly magazine's list of the 10 Best Albums of 2008. It was also the tenth best-selling album in 2008 in the United States. The album was certified 2x Multi-Platinum by the RIAA after only being released in the U.S. for 10 weeks.

One of the first singles, "Single Ladies (Put a Ring on It)" was written by Christopher Stewart, Terius Nash, Kuk Harrell and Knowles.

Alongside "If I Were a Boy", the song was released to U.S. radio stations on October 8, 2008. The single peaked at the top spot on the Billboard Hot 100. The song was ranked number one on Rolling Stone magazine's list of the Best 100 Singles of 2008, and is included in the top ten on lists produced by MTV and Time magazine. It has also been named Song of the Year by Fuse TV. "Single Ladies" is certified quadruple platinum.

=== Jamie Foxx, Intuition ===
The first single from Jamie Foxx's release Intuition, "Just Like Me", featuring the vocal production of Kuk Harrell, was released on November 11, 2008. It debuted at number 48 on Billboard's Hot R&B/Hip-Hop Songs chart and peaked at number 19. It also peaked at No. 49 on the Billboard 100.

Harrell produced the vocals on five of the album's tracks. The album itself was released on Dec 16, 2008, debuting at number three on the U.S. Billboard 200, and selling 265,000 copies in its first week. As of May 27, 2009, it was certified Platinum.

=== Alesha Dixon, The Alesha Show / "Let's Get Excited" ===
The Alesha Show is the second album from Alesha Dixon, ex-member of UK garage girl group Mis-Teeq. The album was released on 24 November 2008 in the UK. The Alesha Show debuted on the UK Albums Chart at No. 26 and peaked at No. 11. Kuk Harrell produced, vocal produced, and co-wrote the third single "Let's Get Excited", which peaked at No. 13 in May 2009. Harrell is scheduled to produce with Dixon again for her forthcoming 2010 album.

=== Justin Bieber, My World 2.0 ===
Bieber's My World 2.0 complete album is the result of Kuk Harrell's vocal production. Sales of My World 2.0 have topped the two million mark in the US ahead of the upcoming Justin Bieber tour. The album is the second part of Bieber's two-part debut record and was released in March 2010. According to the latest figures from the Recording Industry Association of America, the album is Justin's first ever multi-platinum record having surpassed the two million milestone.

=== Avatar (Theme Song & Soundtrack), I See You ===
"I See You (Theme from Avatar)" is a pop ballad performed by British singer Leona Lewis. It was written and produced by composer James Horner, Simon Franglen and Kuk Harrell for the soundtrack album to the highest-grossing film of all time by James Cameron, Avatar. It was nominated for a Golden Globe for Best Original Song at the 67th Golden Globe Awards in 2010, and Grammy Awards for Best Song Written for a Motion Picture, Television or Other Visual Media at the 53rd Grammy Awards in 2011. It was also nominated for the 2011 Grammys.

=== Rihanna, Loud ===
Loud is the fifth studio album by Barbadian recording artist Rihanna, released November 12, 2010, on Def Jam Recordings. Harrell recorded the album partially during Rihanna's Last Girl on Earth Tour. The album debuted at number one on the Canadian and Swiss Albums Chart. Loud entered at number three on the US Billboard 200 chart, selling 207,000 copies in its first week in the United States. It produced four singles, including the international hits "Only Girl (In the World)", "What's My Name?", and "S&M". It has also earned Harrell a Grammy Award for Best Dance Recording for the lead single "Only Girl (In the World)".

=== Justin Bieber, Never Say Never ===
"Never Say Never" by recording artist Justin Bieber serves as the theme song for The Karate Kid (2010), and features rap interludes from the film's star, Jaden Smith. Kuk Harrell also served as Music Supervisor for Bieber's 3D concert film of the same name. Written by The Messengers, Rambert, Smith, Bieber, and Harrell, the song was released for digital download in the United States on June 8, 2010. The song was later included as a track on the remix album My Worlds Acoustic (2010). The song was released as the lead single from Bieber's second remix album, Never Say Never – The Remixes.

== Harrell's vocal production philosophy ==
Harrell claims to serve as both vocal producer and audio engineer for his studio sessions. He is quoted as saying "...I engineer all of my own stuff. I create the pace that the artist wants. To have someone in the middle – another engineer – would slow down my process."

Regarding vocal processors, Harrell says "it's the sound of today in pop music. But I use it as an enhancement and not to create the sound. My role is to capture the artist's personality. To trick them out with Auto-Tune would defeat that purpose, but consumers are used to hearing things pitch perfect so I use pitch correction to ensure that I have a flawless performance."

Harrell cites the three most important things he has learned in his career as
1. "Always be professional."
2. "Be patient at all times."
3. "It's not about you. A producer has the opportunity to put his image onto a project before getting the best sound from the artist. Remember that the artist is what it's all about."

== Discography ==
Year	Album/Song	Artist	Credit
2025	Love Hangover	Jennie feat. Dominic Fike	Recording Engineer, Vocal Engineer, Vocal Producer
2025	Born Again	Lisa feat. Doja Cat & Raye	Vocal Producer
2024	Cowboy Carter	Beyoncé	Vocal Producer
2024	Rockstar	Lisa	Vocal Producer
2024	New Woman	Lisa ft. Rosalía	Vocal Producer
2024	Mantra	Jennie	Recording Engineer, Vocal Engineer, Vocal Producer
2024	Moonlit Floor (Kiss Me)	Lisa	Vocal Producer
2021	Hrs and Hrs	Muni Long	
2021	Montero	Lil Nas X	Vocal Producer
2019	Motivation	Normani	Vocal Producer
2019	DNA/New Love	Backstreet Boys	Vocal Producer
2019	DNA/Chances	Backstreet Boys	Vocal Producer
2017	Invasion of Privacy	Cardi B	Vocal Producer
2017	Camila	Camila Cabello	Vocal Producer
2017	Ultraviolet	Justine Skye	Vocal Producer
2017	Melodrama	Lorde	Vocal Producer
2017	Future Friends	Superfruit	Vocal Producer
2017	Left Me Hangin'	Jacob Sartorius	Vocal Producer
2017	SHINE	Wale (rapper)	Vocal Producer
2017	R.O.S.E	Jessie J	Vocal Producer
2017	HNDRXX	Future (rapper)	Vocal Producer
2017	Damn	Kendrick Lamar	Vocal Producer
2017	Grateful	DJ Khaled	Vocal Producer
2016	This Is What You Came For (song)	Calvin Harris feat. Rihanna	Producer
2016	ANTI	Rihanna	Vocal Producer
2016	Famous (song)	Kanye West	Vocal Producer
2015	Signs	Claudia Leitte	Vocal Producer
2015	Pentatonix	Pentatonix	Vocal Producer
2014	Sweet Talker	Jessie J	Vocal Producer
2014	Bad Intentions	Niykee Heaton	Engineer, Vocal Engineer, Vocal Producer
2013	Closer to the Truth	Cher	Engineer, Vocal Engineer, Vocal Producer, Vocals (Background)
2012	Believe	Justin Bieber	Album Producer, Vocal Producer, Engineer
2012	Call My Name	Cheryl	Vocal Producer
2012	How We Do (Party)	Rita Ora	Producer
2011	Louder	Parade (band)	Vocal Producer, Writer
2011	Talk That Talk (album)	Rihanna	Vocal Producer, Engineer
2011	Under The Mistletoe	Justin Bieber	Producer, Vocal Producer, Vocals, Vocals (Background)
2011	LOVE? (album)	Jennifer Lopez	Vocal Producer, Engineer
2011	Femme Fatale (album)	Britney Spears	Vocal Producer, Engineer
2011	F.A.M.E. (album)	Chris Brown	Vocal Producer, Engineer
2010	Never Say Never: The Remixes (album)	Justin Bieber	Producer, Vocal Producer, Engineer
2010	My Worlds Acoustic (album)	Justin Bieber	Vocal Producer, Engineer
2010	Loud (album)	Rihanna	Vocal Producer, Engineer
2010	Teenage Dream (album)	Katy Perry	Vocal Producer, Engineer
2009	Avatar Soundtrack & Movie/"I See You"	Leona Lewis	Composer
2009	My World 2.0 (album)	Justin Bieber	Vocal Producer, Engineer
2009	D.N.A./"Starlight"	Mario	Vocal Producer, Engineer
2009	D.N.A./"Don't Walk Away"	Mario	Vocal Producer, Engineer
2009	My World/"One Time"	Justin Bieber	Vocal Producer
2009	This Is the One/"Automatic Pt. II"/"Dirty Desire"	Utada	Vocal Producer
2009	Fantasy Ride/"High Price"	Ciara feat. Ludacris	Vocal Producer
2009	Fantasy Ride/"Lover's Thing"	Ciara feat. The-Dream	Vocal Producer
2009	Fantasy Ride/"Like a Surgeon"	Ciara	Vocal Producer
2009	Fantasy Ride/"Keep Dancin' On Me"	Ciara	Vocal Producer
2009	Just Go/"Somewhere in London"	Lionel Richie	Vocal Producer
2009	Just Go/"Into You Deep"	Lionel Richie	Vocal Producer
2009	Just Go/"Good Morning"	Lionel Richie	Vocal Producer
2009	Just Go/"I'm Not Okay"	Lionel Richie	Vocal Producer
2009	Just Go/"Forever and a Day"	Lionel Richie	Vocal Producer
2009	Just Go	Lionel Richie	Vocal Producer
2008	The Alesha Show/"Let's Get Excited"	Alesha Dixon	Producer, Vocal Producer, Composer
2008	Colby O/"The Difference"	Colby O'Donis	Vocal Producer
2008	Intuition	Jamie Foxx	Vocal Producer
2008	Intuition/"Rainman"	Jamie Foxx	Vocal Producer
2008	Intuition/"Slow"	Jamie Foxx	Vocal Producer
2008	Intuition/"Why"	Jamie Foxx	Vocal Producer
2008	Intuition/"Digital Girl"	Jamie Foxx feat. Kanye West and The-Dream	Vocal Producer
2008	Intuition/"Just Like Me"	Jamie Foxx	Vocal Producer
2008	I Am... Sasha Fierce/"Single Ladies (Put a Ring on It)"	Beyoncé	Composer, Engineer
2008	Here I Stand	Usher	Composer, Vocal Producer, Engineer
2008	Here I Stand/"Moving Mountains"	Usher	Composer, Vocal Producer, Engineer
2008	Here I Stand/"This Ain't Sex"	Usher	Vocal Producer
2008	Here I Stand/"What's Your Name?"	Usher	Vocal Producer
2008	Here I Stand/"Trading Places"	Usher	Vocal Producer
2008	Departure/Leavin'	Jesse McCartney	Vocal Producer
2008	E=MC²/"Touch My Body"	Mariah Carey	Engineer
2008	Discipline/"Greatest Ex Ever"	Janet Jackson	Engineer
2007	Love Hate/I Luv Your Girl	The-Dream	Engineer
2007	Back of My Lac'	J. Holiday	Engineer
2007	Back of my 'Lac/"Suffocate"	J. Holiday	Vocal Arranger, Engineer
2007	Taking Chances/"Skies of L.A."	Celine Dion	Vocal Producer, Composer, Engineer,
2007	Growing Pains	Mary J. Blige	Composer, Vocal Producer, Engineer, Background Vocals
2007	Growing Pains/"Just Fine"	Mary J. Blige	Vocal Producer
2007	Growing Pains/"Work That"	Mary J. Blige	Vocal Producer
2007	Growing Pains/"Grown Woman"	Mary J. Blige	Vocal Producer
2007	Growing Pains/"Feel Like a Woman"	Mary J. Blige	Vocal Producer
2007	Growing Pains/"Shakedown" featuring Usher	Mary J. Blige	Vocal Producer
2007	Growing Pains/"Roses"	Mary J. Blige	Vocal Producer
2007	Growing Pains/"Come to Me (PEACE)"	Mary J. Blige	Composer, Vocal Producer
2007	Growing Pains/(Japanese Bonus Track)"Mirror"	Mary J. Blige	Vocal Producer
2007	Growing Pains/(Japanese Bonus Track) "Sleepwalkin'"	Mary J. Blige	Vocal Producer
2007	Good Girl Gone Bad/"Umbrella"	Rihanna feat. Jay-Z	Composer, Vocal Producer, Engineer
2007	Good Girl Gone Bad	Rihanna	Vocal Producer, Engineer
2007	Good Girl Gone Bad/"Breakin' Dishes"	Rihanna	Composer, Vocal Producer, Engineer
2007	Exclusive/"You"	Chris Brown	Vocal Producer, Engineer
2006	Alter Ego	Tyrese	Engineer
2005	Back For More	Shawn Desman	Vocal Producer
2004	20th Century Masters-The Millennium Collection	Chante More	Producer
2002	Turn the Tide	Various Artist	Arranger, Background Vocals
2002	Live	Promise Keepers	Vocals
2002	Deeper Faith	John Tesh	Background Vocals
1999	Top 25 Praise Songs	Various Artists	Vocals
1996	Vybin' Young Soul Rebels	Various Artists	Vocals
1996	From I Extreme II Another	II D Extreme	Engineer
1995	Toast to the Ladies	The Whispers	Producer, Programming, Engineer, Sequencing, Rhythm Arrangements
1995	Love Supreme	Chante Moore	Producer, Vocal Arrangement, Engineer
1995	Can We Talk?	Shiro	Producer
1995	Bump And Grind	Various Artists	Programming, Producer, Engineer, Sequencing, Rhythm Arrangements
1994	Debelah	Debelah	Producer
1993	Aces and Kings – The Best of Go West	Go West	Producer
1992	White Men Can't Jump Original Soundtrack	Various Artists	Composer, Recorder, Producer, Engineer

== Awards ==
=== Grammy Awards ===
Year	Nominee / work	Award	Result
2008	"Umbrella"	Record of the Year	Nominated
2008	"Umbrella"	Song of the Year	Nominated
2009	Growing Pains	Best Contemporary R&B Album	Won
2010	"Single Ladies (Put a Ring on It)"	Best R&B Song	Won
2010	"Single Ladies (Put a Ring on It)"	Song of the Year	Won
2010	I Am... Sasha Fierce	Album of the Year	Nominated
2011	"Only Girl (In the World)"	Best Dance Recording	Won
2011	"I See You"	Best Song Written for a Motion Picture, Television or Other Visual Media	Nominated
2011	Teenage Dream	Album of the Year	Nominated
2012	Loud	Album of the Year	Nominated
2014	Unapologetic	Best Urban Contemporary Album	Won
2017	"Work"	Record of the Year	Nominated
2019	"I Like It"	Record of the Year	Nominated
2022	"Montero"	Album of the Year	Nominated
2022	Hero (Afrojack and David Guetta song)	Best Dance/Electronic Recording	Nominated
2023	Hrs and Hrs	Best R&B Song	Nominated

=== Other awards ===
Year	Artist	Album/Song	Award
2007	Rihanna	Good Girl Gone Bad/"Umbrella"	Ascap Pop Award "One of the Most Played Songs of 2007"
2007	Rihanna	Good Girl Gone Bad/"Umbrella"	Ascap Rhythm and Soul Award "One of the chart topping R&B/Hip Hop Songs of 2007"
1999	Various Artists	Top 25 Praise Songs	RIAA certified Gold Record
