= Breathe Slow =

2009 single by Alesha Dixon

Single by Alesha Dixon

from the album The Alesha Show
- Released: 9 February 2009
- Studio: Westlake Recording (Los Angeles)
- Genre: Pop; R&B
- Length: 4:12 (album version); 3:40 (radio edit)
- Label: Asylum
- Songwriters: Carsten Schack; Kenneth Karlin; Johnnie V. Newt; Harold Lilly; Antonio Dixon
- Producer: Soulshock & Karlin

Alesha Dixon singles chronology
"The Boy Does Nothing" (2008)	"Breathe Slow" (2009)	"Let's Get Excited" (2009)

Music video
- "Breathe Slow" on YouTube

"Breathe Slow" is a song performed by British singer-songwriter Alesha Dixon. It is the second single from her second studio album, The Alesha Show, released by Asylum Records, a part of Atlantic Records, on 9 February 2009. The song peaked at number three on the UK Singles Chart. The song was nominated at the BRIT Awards 2010 in the Best British single category.

== Reception ==
Popular blog Popjustice made the single their Song of the Day on 30 December 2008, saying "Everyone loves Alesha Dixon. Most people are quite indifferent about purchasing her musical releases. As time goes by we probably have to accept this as fact, but songs like 'Breathe Slow' do offer some hope that she might 'hit the mark' and have a big proper hit one day."

Trash Lounge commented "It's nowhere near the same league as 'The Boy Does Nothing', but 'Breathe Slow' is still a pretty decent offering from its hit-and-miss parent album."

== Chart performance ==
In the United Kingdom, "Breathe Slow" debuted at number 163 on the UK Singles Chart and entered the top 100 the following week at number 92. On 1 February 2009, the song rose into the top 10 at number six, climbed to number five the following week, and peaked at number three after being released physically on 9 February 2009. On the Irish Singles Chart, the single debuted at number 48 and peaked at number 18.

== Music video ==
The video, directed by Max & Dania was shot entirely in black and white, tells the story of Dixon breaking up with her husband, and her trying to regain composure and forget about it. She is seen entering a quiet café, upon leaving she takes off her coat revealing a show-girl outfit and leaves behind her wedding ring, then walks down a busy Las Vegas street. Meanwhile, Dixon is seen dancing alone in studio. The video ends with her entering the stage door of a show with an Elvis impersonator and two other show-girls stood outside. The video, filmed on location in Las Vegas, clashed with the Ricky Hatton vs. Paulie Malignaggi boxing match and caused shooting problems as many British Hatton supporters recognised Dixon, and subsequently crowds gathered in the street. The video has gained over 10 million hits on YouTube.

== Track listings ==
- UK CD single
1. "Breathe Slow" (Single Version) – 3:40
2. "Breathe Slow" (Piano Mix) - 3:41
- UK 1-Track Promo [A] (Card sleeve)
1. "Breathe Slow" (Piano Mix) - 3:41
- UK 1-Track Promo [B] (Blue jewel case)
1. "Breathe Slow" (Single Version) – 3:40
- UK 4-Track Promo (White jewel case)
1. "Breathe Slow" (Single Version) – 3:40
2. "Breathe Slow" (Ali Payami Remix) - 6:50
3. "Breathe Slow" (Cahill Club Mix) - 6:59
4. "Breathe Slow" (Cahill Radio Edit) - 3:33
- iTunes EP
1. "Breathe Slow" (Piano Mix) - 3:41
2. "Breathe Slow" (Cahill Radio Edit) - 3:31
3. "Breathe Slow" (Blackout Entertainment Edit) [Featuring Scottie B] - 4:19
- Amazon.co.uk / 7Digital EP
1. "Breathe Slow" (Single Version) – 3:40
2. "Breathe Slow" (Cahill Radio Edit) - 3:33
3. "Breathe Slow" (Ali Payami Remix) - 6:50

== Charts ==
=== Weekly charts ===
Chart (2009)	Peak position
Belgium (Ultratip Bubbling Under Flanders)	12
Belgium (Ultratip Bubbling Under Wallonia)	12
Czech Republic Airplay (ČNS IFPI)	12
Europe (Eurochart Hot 100)	13
Ireland (IRMA)	18
Scotland Singles (OCC)	4
Slovakia Airplay (ČNS IFPI)	30
Spanish Airplay (PROMUSICAE)	20
UK Singles (OCC)	3
UK Singles Downloads (OCC)	3

=== Year-end charts ===
Chart (2009)	Position
UK Singles (OCC)	44

== Sales and certifications ==
Region	Certification	Certified units/sales
United Kingdom (BPI)	Gold	400,000^{‡}
^{‡} Sales+streaming figures based on certification alone.

== Release history ==
Country	Release date	Format	Label
United Kingdom	16 February 2009	CD single, digital download	Asylum Records
Ireland	16 February 2009	CD single, digital download	Asylum Records
Italy	7 April 2009	Digital download	Warner Music
Spain	21 July 2009	Digital download	Warner Music
