= The Cockman Family =

- The Cockman Family

Background information
- Origin: Sherrills Ford, North Carolina, U.S.
- Genres: Bluegrass/Gospel, Christian
- Website: cockmanfamily.com

The Cockman Family is a bluegrass/Southern gospel band from Sherrills Ford, North Carolina, United States.

== Band ==
They have been nominated for Bluegrass Artists of the Year, Instrumentalist of the Year, and Bluegrass Band of the Year by the Country Gospel Music Association (CGMA) and for Gold Cross Bluegrass Group of the Year by the International Country Gospel Music Association, and were named one of the "12 Most Creative Families in America" by American Greeting Cards and USA Today Weekend. They were selected as the recipient of the 2011 Community Traditions Award by the North Carolina Folklore Society. They were awarded the 2011 Bluegrass Gospel Group of the Year by Southern Branch Bluegrass Caroline Cockman Fisher won "Female Vocalist of the Year" and "Songwriter of the Year" by Powergrass Internet Radio. They were also featured in a PBS special program entitled Maker of the Stars: A Cockman Family Christmas, and are known in North Carolina as cast members on a series of seven, one-hour PBS specials, The Arthur Smith Show, Now & Then. The Cockman Family is currently promoted by Homeland Entertainment under the Heart Warming label.

Billy Cockman won the 2013 National Banjo Championship in Winfield, KS. He also won the South Carolina Banjo Championship at Renofest in Hartsville, SC. and the North Carolina Banjo Championship at The Carolina in the Fall Festival in Wilkesboro.

Ben Cockman won the 2014 National Guitar Championship in Winfield, KS. He has also won multiple regional championships including the South Carolina State and West Virginia State Flat-pick Guitar championships, the Merlefest Flat-pick guitar championship, and the Ossipee Music Festival's New England Guitar Championship. He is a two-time winner of the Wayne Henderson Bluegrass Festival Guitar championship.

John Cockman Jr. Teaches fiddle online at BluegrassDaddy.com.

The Butterpats, a second-generation youth group featuring John Jr's daughters, were awarded the 2011 WMA Harmony Yodeling Duo of the Year and the 2011 WMA Youth Harmony award at the Western Music Association Showcase and Awards Show in Albuquerque, NM.

Terrapin Creek, a group within the Cockman Family Grandkids have started a new band which you can expect to hear them by the end of 2018. The band consists of Arwen Cockman on the fiddle, who writes many of their songs and is a main singer. Lorien on the bass and dobro and is also the lead singer. She also writes most of their songs. Samuel Fisher, who plays the guitar, mandolin, and banjo. The last member is Joseph Cockman who plays the guitar, bass and will also be the lead in many songs.

The Cockman Family has developed a distinct bluegrass gospel style that has gained audiences throughout the Southeast. Their arrangements of old gospel songs have been very popular. Their tight harmonies and original songs have been applauded for their unique sounds.

The Cockman Family is made up of a sister, four brothers, and their father: John Cockman Sr. on guitar, Caroline Cockman Fisher on lead vocals, John Cockman Jr. on fiddle and bass vocals, Billy Cockman on banjo and tenor vocals, David Cockman on bass and baritone vocals, and Ben Cockman on mandolin and baritone vocals.

The Cockman Family has recorded multiple records. Eleven of their songs have been released as singles to bluegrass and gospel radio stations. Their newest album, Dedicated, was released in 2011 and features original songs as well as favorite hymns.
