= Blaque discography =

- Studio albums: 3
- Compilation albums: 1
- Singles: 10

American R&B band Blaque has released three studio albums. Formed after being introduced to Lisa "Left Eye" Lopes of TLC and her brother Ronald, the band debuted in 1997 when they made a cameo appearance in the video for rapper Lil' Kim's "Not Tonight (Remix)." In 1999, their self-titled debut album was released by Trackmasters Entertainment and Columbia Records. A R&B and pop album, with hip hop and teen pop influences, the album reached number 23 on the US Top R&B/Hip-Hop Albums chart and was eventually certified Platinum by the Recording Industry Association of America (RIAA), with domestic sales of more than 1.5 million copies. Blaque produced two top ten hits on the US Billboard Hot 100, including "808" and "Bring It All to Me."

Blaque's second album Blaque Out was initially expected to be released on December 11, 2001 in United States, but received a Japan-wide physical release on January 29, 2002 only amid the commercial failure of lead single "Can't Get It Back" and the pregnancy of band member Natina Reed. It was finally issued as a digital download through iTunes on May 22, 2007. Blaque later transitioned to Elektra Records where they released the single "I'm Good" as part of the soundtrack of the dance film Honey (2003) and began recording of their third album Torch. As with Blaque Out, the album remained unreleased. Following the death of Reed in 2012, remaining members Shamari Fears and Brandi Williams released several standalone singles, including "Summertime Riding" and "Today." In 2019, Fears and Williams eventually released Torch digitally through The Move Entertainment to coincide with the twentieth release anniversary of their self titled debut album.

== Albums ==
=== Studio albums ===
List of studio albums, with selected chart positions and certifications
Title	Album details	Peak chart positions			Certifications
Title	Album details	US	US R&B	JP	Certifications
Blaque	Released: June 1, 1999; Label: Trackmasters, Columbia; Format: CD, cassette, digital download, LP	53	23	24	RIAA: Platinum
Blaque Out	Released: January 29, 2002; Label: Columbia; Format: CD, digital download, LP	—	—	—	
Torch	Released: May 31, 2019; Label: Blaque LLC/The Move Entertainment; Format: Digital Download	—	—	—	

=== Compilation albums ===
List of compilation albums, with selected details
Title	Album details
Blaque by Popular Demand	Released: February 27, 2007; Label: Sony BMG; Format: CD

== Singles ==
List of singles, with selected chart positions and parent album
Title	Year	Peak chart positions						Album
Title	Year	US	US R&B	US Pop	AUS	CAN	UK	Album
"808"	1999	8	4	33	68	—	31	Blaque
"I Do" (featuring Lisa Lopes)	1999	—	73	39	94	—	—	Blaque
"Bring It All to Me"	1999	5	15	6	—	7	—	Blaque
"Adore Me"	2000	—	—	—	—	—	—	Blaque
"As If"	2000	—	—	—	—	—	—	Bring It On soundtrack
"Can't Get It Back"	2001	—	91	—	—	—	—	Blaque Out
"I'm Good"	2003	—	95	—	28	—	—	Honey soundtrack
"Ugly" (featuring Missy Elliott)	2003	—	— (Note: "Ugly" did not enter the US R&B chart, but peaked at number 70 on the Billboard's Hot R&B / Hip-Hop Singles Sales chart.)	—	—	—	—	Torch
"Summertime Riding"	2013	—	—	—	—	—	—	Non-album singles
"Today"	2014	—	—	—	—	—	—	Non-album singles

== Other appearances ==
List of album appearances
Title	Year	Album
"You Can Always Go" (with Jagged Edge)	2000	Big Momma's House
"Head to the Sky" (with Lisa "Left Eye" Lopes)	2001	Supernova
"Can't Trust Myself"	2001	On the Line
"Lovely" (with Lil Wayne and Mannie Fresh)	2002	500 Degreez
"Schaatzee" (with DJ Tomekk and Horace Brown)	2005	Numma Eyns

== Music videos ==
List of music videos
Title	Year	Director(s)
"808"	1999	Martin Weisz
"I Do"	1999	Bille Woodruff
"Bring It All to Me"	1999	Bille Woodruff
"As If"	2000	Director X
"Can't Get It Back"	2001	Liz Friedlander
"I'm Good"	2003	Jake Nava
