= Lisa Lopes discography =

- Studio albums: 1
- Extended plays: 2
- Compilation albums: 1
- Singles: 6
- Music videos: 1
- Guest appearances: 18

The discography of Lisa Lopes, an American rapper, consists of one studio album and one compilation/remix album (released posthumously), three singles and one solo music video.

== Albums ==
=== Studio albums ===
Title	Details	Peak chart positions		
Title	Details	US R&B	US Rap	US Indie
Supernova	Release date: August 14, 2001; Label: Arista; Formats: CD, cassette	—	—	—
Eye Legacy	Release date: January 27, 2009; Label: E1 Entertainment; Formats: CD, digital download	44	15	30
"—" denotes releases that did not chart

== Extended plays ==
Title	Details
Forever... The EP	Released: November 3, 2009; Format: Digital download
Reigndrops in My LeftEye	Released: January 28, 2013; Format: Digital download

== Singles ==
Title	Year	Peak chart positions				Album
Title	Year	US R&B/HH Bub.	AUS	NLD	UK	Album
"The Block Party"	2001	21	41	30	16	Supernova
"Let's Just Do It" (featuring Missy Elliott and TLC)	2009	—	—	—	—	Eye Legacy
"Block Party" (featuring Lil Mama)	2009	—	—	—	—	Eye Legacy

=== Promotional singles ===
Title	Year	Album
"Hot!"	2001	Supernova
"Untouchable" (featuring 2Pac)	2002	Supernova
"Crank It" (featuring Reigndrop Lopes)	2009	Eye Legacy

=== Collaboration singles ===
Title	Year	Chart positions				Certifications	Album
Title	Year	US Hot 100	US R&B/Hip-Hop	AUS	UK	Certifications	Album
"How Do You Like It?" (Part 1) (Keith Sweat featuring Lisa Lopes)	1994	48	9	—	71		Get Up on It
"How Do You Like It?" (Part 2) (Keith Sweat featuring Lisa Lopes)	1994	—	—	—	—		Get Up on It
"Freedom" (rap version) (Various artists featuring Lisa Lopes)	1995	—	—	—	—		Panther
"Gee, Officer Krupke!" (Salt-n-Pepa, Def Jef, Lisa Lopes, The Jerky Boys, and Paul Rodriguez)	1996	—	—	—	—		The Songs of West Side Story
"World Wide" (O.F.T.B. featuring Lisa Lopes, Kadafi, Kurupt and Makaveli)	1996	—	—	—	—		O.F.T.B. - The Missing Dr.Files
"No Tighter Wish" (Lisa Lopes and Tangi Forman)	1996	—	—	—	—		Kazaam
"Not Tonight" (Ladies Night remix) (Lil' Kim featuring Da Brat, Lisa Lopes, Missy Elliott, and Angie Martinez)	1997	6	3	—	11		Hard Core / Nothing to Lose soundtrack
"Big Willie Style" (Will Smith featuring Lisa Lopes)	1997	—	—	—	—		Big Willie Style
"What's Up" (De De O'Neal featuring Lisa Lopes)	1998	—	—	—	—		Black Music Month Summer 1998 Promo Sampler
"Cradle Rock" (Method Man featuring Lisa Lopes and Booster)	1998	—	—	—	—		Tical 2000: Judgement Day
"U Know What's Up" (Donell Jones featuring Lisa Lopes)	1999	7	1	55	2		Where I Wanna Be
"I Do" (remix) (Blaque featuring Lisa Lopes)	1999	—	73	—	—		Blaque
"Never Be the Same Again" (Melanie C featuring Lisa Lopes)	2000	—	—	2	1	UK: Gold; AUS: Platinum; GER: Gold; SWE: Platinum; SWI: Gold	Northern Star
"Takin' Me Over" (Mýa featuring Lisa Lopes)	2000	—	—	—	—		Fear of Flying
"Gimme Some" (Toni Braxton featuring Lisa Lopes)	2000	—	—	—	—		The Heat
"Space Cowboy (Yippie-Yi-Yay)" (*NSYNC featuring Lisa Lopes)	2000	—	—	—	—		No Strings Attached
"Let Em Have It (Committee Mix)" (2Pac and Lisa Lopes)	2001	—	—	—	—		Until the End of Time
"Dirty Girl" (remix) (Latrelle featuring Lisa Lopes)	2001	—	—	—	—		Dirty Girl, Wrong Girl, Bad Girl (unreleased)
"Crush On You" (Egypt featuring Lisa Lopes)	2002	—	—	—	—		
"Too Street 4 T.V" (N.I.N.A featuring Danny Boy)	2003	—	—	—	—		Dysfunktional Family
"Ridin' By" (featuring Raina "Reigndrop" Lopes)	2004	—	—	—	—		
"Fantasies" (Bootleg of The Dayton Family featuring Lisa Lopes)	2012	—	—	—	—		
"What's Up with You and Me" (Cognito featuring Lisa Lopes)	2012	—	—	—	—		

== Music videos ==
Year	Title	Director(s)
1990	"Angel" (Lorenzo Smith)	
1994	"How Do You Like It?" (with Keith Sweat)	
1997	"Not Tonight" (with Lil Kim, Angie Martinez, Da Brat & Missy Elliott)	Lance "Un" Rivera
1998	"Am I Dreaming" (Ol' Skool & Xscape)	Keith Sweat
1999	"8o8" (with Blaque)	Bille Woodruff
1999	"I Do" (Blaque)	
1999	"U Know What's Up" (with Donnell Jones)	David Nelson
2000	"Never Be the Same Again" (with Melanie C)	Francis Lawrence
2001	"The Block Party"	Hype Williams
