= I'm Good (Blaque song) =

Single by Blaque

from the album Honey: Music from & Inspired by the Motion Picture
- Released: September 2, 2003
- Genre: Pop; hip hop; R&B
- Length: 3:35
- Label: Elektra
- Songwriters: Rodney Jerkins; LaShawn Daniels; Fred Jerkins III; Natina Reed
- Producer: Rodney Jerkins

Blaque singles chronology
"Can't Get It Back" (2001)	"I'm Good" (2003)	"Ugly" (2003)

"I'm Good" is a song by American R&B/pop vocal trio Blaque. It was written by Rodney Jerkins, LaShawn Daniels, Fred Jerkins III, and group member Natina Reed, and produced by Rodney Jerkins for Blaque's third studio album Torch. The song was also included on the soundtrack for the film Honey (2003) and released as a single in September 2, 2003. "I'm Good" peaked at number 28 on the Australian ARIA Singles Chart, number 47 on the Swiss Singles Chart, and number 57 on the Austrian Singles Chart. It peaked at number 95 on the Billboard Hot R&B/Hip-Hop Songs chart in November 2003.

== Music video ==
A music video for "I'm Good" was directed by Jake Nava.

== Track listings ==
CD single
No.	Title	Writer(s)	Producer(s)	Length
1.	"I'm Good" (Radio Version)	Rodney Jerkins; LaShawn Daniels; Fred Jerkins III; Natina Reed	R. Jerkins	3:52
2.	"I'm Good" (Remix) (featuring Freck Billionaire)	R. Jerkins; Daniels; F. Jerkins; Reed	R. Jerkins; Poke & Tone^{[b]}	4:04
3.	"Ugly"	Missy Elliott; Charlie Bereal; Kenneth Bereal; Craig Brockman; Dante Nolan	Elliott; CKB^{[a]}; Brockman^{[a]}; Nolan^{[a]}; Nisan Stewart^{[b]}	3:52

Notes

- ^{^[a]} denotes co-producer
- ^{^[b]} denotes additional producer

== Personnel and credits ==
Credits adapted from the liner notes of Torch.

- LaShawn Daniels – writer
- Shamari Fears – vocals
- Jean-Marie Horvat – mixing engineer
- Rodney Jerkins – producer, writer
- Fred Jerkins III – writer
- Natina Reed – vocals, writer
- Brandi Williams – vocals

== Charts ==
Weekly chart performance for "I'm Good"
Chart (2003–04)	Peak position
Australia (ARIA)	28
Australian Urban (ARIA)	10
Austria (Ö3 Austria Top 40)	57
Germany (GfK)	52
Switzerland (Schweizer Hitparade)	47
US Hot R&B/Hip-Hop Songs (Billboard)	95
US Rhythmic Airplay (Billboard)	27
