= Natina Reed =

American singer (1980–2012)

- Reed arriving at Sony Studios in Los Angeles c. 1999-2001
- Born: Natina Tiawana Reed; October 28, 1980; New York City, U.S.
- Died: October 26, 2012 (aged 31); Duluth, Georgia, U.S.
- Resting place: North Atlanta Memorial Park, Dunwoody, Georgia, U.S.
- Occupations: Singer; rapper; actress
- Children: 1
- Family: Farrah Franklin (cousin)
- Musical career
- Origin: Atlanta, Georgia, U.S.
- Genres: R&B; hip hop; pop
- Instrument: Vocals
- Years active: 1996–2012
- Labels: Elektra; Trackmasters Entertainment; Columbia
- Formerly of: Blaque
- Website: therealnatina.com (archive)

Natina Tiawana Reed (October 28, 1980 – October 26, 2012) was an American singer, rapper and actress. She was born in Queens and raised in Atlanta, where she pursued a career in music beginning in her early teens. Discovered by rapper Lisa Lopes, she worked as a writer for the girl group TLC. Reed gained notice in the late 1990s as a member of the girl group Blaque. They released two albums: their 1999 debut album Blaque that peaked at number 53 on the Billboard 200, and Blaque Out (2001).

Reed starred as a cheerleader in the 2000 teen comedy film Bring It On. She later appeared as herself in the comedy-drama television series V.I.P. and the 2003 dance film Honey. Blaque disbanded after an unsuccessful transition to Elektra in 2003 and failed an attempt at a reunion in 2010. Reed took a hiatus from music to further pursue acting. In the early 2000s, she was engaged to rapper Kurupt and gave birth to their son. On October 26, 2012, Reed died after being struck by a car near Lilburn, Georgia.

== Life and career ==
=== 1980–1996: Early life and career beginnings ===
Reed was born on October 28, 1980, in Queens, to Paul Reed, a reverend, and Tamara Goodridge. The family moved to Atlanta, when Reed was age four. She had two sisters, Niesha and Genni Reed, and one brother, Michael Whalen. Her parents divorced, resulting in Reed having a stepfather, Mark Goodridge, a stepmother, Luci Reed, and seven step-siblings who live in London. She was singer Farrah Franklin's cousin. Reed initially wanted to be either Miss America, a veterinarian, an actress, and entertainment attorney. By age eight, she had modeled for Macy's and Bloomingdale's advertising campaigns and acted in a hot dog commercial.

Reed played drums at her father's church and performed as part of its drama ministry. She would often beatbox and create beats by hitting walls while writing lyrics to match the melodies. Reed also wrote poems and jingles, with one being purchased by Sprite. Around the ages of 13 or 14, she submitted a song for a competition and won; Reed said that after this experience, she had tried to be more open about her songwriting and allow other people to hear her work. Lisa Lopes discovered Reed through her talent scout brother, and hired her to write for TLC. Reed said that Lopes helped to build her confidence. Following the encouragement of Tommy Mottola, Reed worked as "the official writer" for TLC. She attended Cedar Grove High School.

=== 1997–1999: Blaque ===
Lopes created the girl group Blaque, an acronym for Believe, Life, Achieving, Quest, Unity and Everything, as "an outlet" for Reed. The group included singers Shamari Fears and Brandi Williams; Lopes described Reed as the rapper and writer of the trio. Reed and Fears were school friends, and worked together on other music projects including an urban country group. They had met Williams during an audition for Lopes' production company Left Eye Productions. Reed was 19 when Left Eye Productions signed the trio. Lopes mentored and managed the trio and media outlets identified Reed as Lopes' protégé. Reed explained Blaque's sound and style: "The vibe we want to get across that we're universal. We're not just urban and R&B." According to Billboard, Blaque's music contains elements of R&B, pop music, and rap music. Jean-Claude Olivier of Trackmasters said that Blaque was more pop in comparison to TLC. Blaque first appeared as a group during a cameo appearance in the music videos for the remix of Lil' Kim's 1997 single "Not Tonight" and Jermaine Dupri's 1998 song "Someday at Christmas". In 1999, they performed as the opening act for NSYNC's NSYNC in Concert and TLC's FanMail Tour.

The group recorded their first album Blaque with producer Dallas Austin in a Miami studio. They also worked on the record at Lenny Kravitz's home for two weeks. The trio collaborated with rappers Missy Elliott and Queen Latifah during the recording sessions. Reed was the primary writer for Blaque, having co-writing credits on seven of the album's 14 tracks; "I Do" was written entirely by Reed. Her tracks were published through Dotted Line (Broadcast Music, Inc. (BMI)). A Los Angeles Sentinel writer identified Reed as "the sassy MC who gave hits like '808' their punch", while Bruce Britt of BMI characterized her musical style as "brash hip-hop rhymes". In her 2008 book Pop Princesses, author Beth Peters wrote that Reed's reputation was "notoriously naughty" and "wild, fiery, and feisty".

Blaque was released June 1, 1999, under Trackmasters' imprint label. (Note: For the international release, the album was titled Blaque Ivory.) Blaque peaked at number 53 on the Billboard 200; on April 10, 2000, the album was certified platinum and had sold over 1.5 million copies worldwide. It was promoted through three singles: "808", "Bring It All to Me", and "I Do". The first two tracks charted at number eight and five on the Billboard Hot 100, respectively. On June 2, 1999, "808" was certified gold for selling over 500,000 copies worldwide. When Reed was 14, she wrote "I Do" after seeing singer-songwriter Alanis Morissette on MTV. She said: "I wanted to write a song that could make an artist like her have the acceptance to be played on [R&B] stations." A writer for BET noted the group's music videos had a "futuristic feel", and Reed said: "We're straight out of the year 2080."

=== 2000–2002: Bring It On and continuing music career ===
Reed played cheerleader Jenelope in the 2000 teen comedy film Bring It On, her first acting role. She described the character as "the one with the attitude" and "ghetto and cute at the same time". She appeared alongside Williams and Fears, who played LaFred and Lava, friends to lead character Isis (played by Gabrielle Union). Reed, Williams and Fears would often look into the camera when delivering their lines, because of their lack of acting experience. Blaque contributed two songs to the film's soundtrack: "As If" and a remix of "Bring It All to Me" featuring verses from rapper 50 Cent. On the 15th anniversary of its release, Union said that people erroneously associate Reed's lines ("Can we just beat these Buffys down?" and "You been touched by an angel, girl") with her character.

Reed appeared as herself in a 2001 episode of the comedy-drama television series V.I.P. The same year, she was featured on the hook for her then-fiancée Kurupt's single "It's Over" from his third studio album Space Boogie: Smoke Oddessey, and appeared in its music video flirting with him. Jazmin Perez of Vibe included it as one of the "tracks to watch", though Reed's portion was criticized as childish and incongruent with the rest of the single. "It's Over" peaked at number 88 on the Hot R&B/Hip-Hop Songs Billboard chart. Blaque was featured on the song "Head to the Sky" on Lopes' debut solo album Supernova also released in 2001.

On January 29, 2002, Blaque's second studio album Blaque Out was released only in Japan. It was made available temporarily for digital download in 2007 in the United States and was reissued in 2011. Discussing its release, Reed said that the death of a group member's mother and "technical difficulties" led to the delays. "Can't Get It Back" (2001) was the lead single from the album, and promoted with a music video. The song charted at number 91 on the Hot R&B/Hip-Hop Songs. Reed felt that Blaque Out was the group's best album. She is credited as a songwriter on it. In a review of Blaque Out, Demetria Lucas of Vibe criticized Reed's verses and vocals as too similar to Lopes and wrote it "makes for monotony". Blaque made a cameo appearance in the music video for Jermaine Dupri's single "Welcome to Atlanta" (2002). In the same year, Reed's song "Rock Climber" was featured on the compilation album Dragonfly Presents a Better Life Through Chemistry.

=== 2003–2012: Career setbacks and hiatus ===
In 2003, Blaque recorded a third album Torch with Elektra, which was never released. (Note: Despite reports that Torch was not released, AllMusic erroneously reported that it was made available on August 5, 2003 and it was reviewed by Vibe.) The group worked closely with Missy Elliott on five of the album's tracks. Scheduled for release in August 2003, it was promoted with the single "Ugly" featuring verses by Elliott. Reed was unhappy with Torch's musical direction and her lack of creative control. According to Reed, Blaque retains the rights for the album, and they collectively refused to release it. She explained: "If it's not necessary to give them a record that we don't even too much care for, why give it to them?" Despite it not being released, Ernest Hardy of Vibe somehow obtained a copy of Torch and in a review wrote that Reed's raps are "filled with hiccup effects, yeah-yeahs, and nasal phrasing", "lifted" from Lopes, describing the album as "passable, if highly derivative".

In 2004, Blaque contributed the single "I'm Good" to the soundtrack album for the 2003 dance film Honey, and make a cameo appearance as themselves. "I'm Good" was Blaque's highest-charting single in the United Kingdom, peaking at number 17 on the UK Singles Chart. The song also reached number 95 on the Hot R&B/Hip-Hop Songs chart. Blaque separated in 2004, and Fears and Williams pursued careers as solo artists. Before the group broke up, singer Erica Pullins was temporarily hired as a replacement for Reed. A compilation album Blaque by Popular Demand was released on February 27, 2007.

Reed said that she took a hiatus from her music career "to focus on other aspirations that she ha[d] including acting". According to other reports, she left Blaque to join a Christian ministry. After Torch was not released, Reed refused to record secular music and pursued gospel music instead. In 2008, she appeared as herself in the television film Til 6 in the Morning by Platinum Souls. The online magazine Bossip reported that Reed was arrested on April 13, 2010, in Gwinnett County on charges of prostitution, disorderly conduct, and cocaine possession; this news was picked up by other outlets. Reed's management denied the arrest report, saying that the alleged mugshots were photoshopped by someone who had previously hacked into and deleted Reed's Twitter account. (Note: Reed's charges are not listed on the websites for the Gwinnett County Courts or the Gwinnett County Jail.) On June 29, 2011, she was arrested on charges of driving under the influence (DUI), reckless driving, and driving without a license, and was jailed for two days. Reed's license had been revoked after a previous DUI arrest. During their hiatus, Blaque attempted a reunion, and worked on a project known as Private Show. The album was abandoned because the members had different priorities.

In a 2012 interview, Reed said she waited to pursue a solo career to avoid comparisons with other artists, specifically rapper Nicki Minaj. Prior to her death, she was working on a solo album, a book, and scripts and hired an acting agent as a means of "revamping her career". Reed had reunited previously with the Blaque group members for a performance at the Left Eye festival. In the fall of 2012, Blaque had started work on an album and reality television show, but further information about either project was not released following Reed's death.

== Personal life ==
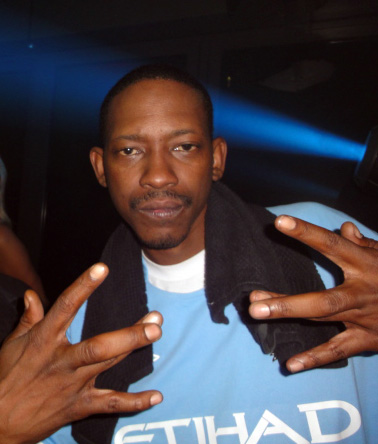
Reed was engaged to Kurupt (pictured in 2011) in the early 2000s— they have one child together.

During the early 2000s, Reed became engaged to Kurupt, though the couple never married. They had planned to be married in the spring of 2001, and rescheduled it to 2002 or 2003 due to conflicts with their work schedules. Rapper Foxy Brown, Kurupt's former fiancée, dissed Reed on the track "730" from her 2001 album Broken Silence. Reed responded to MTV News:

You can't chase something that doesn't chase you back [...] I don't spend a lot of time thinking about what people think about me. It's petty — it's like people never grow up in this game. You watch Biggie and all that shit that [he] and Pac went through, and people still don't get the message. They still want to start the wars and create fires.

Reed became pregnant with Kurupt's child during the recording of Blaque Out; she said that the album's limited release was the result of her pregnancy and the label's uncertainty over the group's future. In 2002, she gave birth to their son, Tren Brown. Following Reed's pregnancy, the couple separated. Reed's father said that being a mother was "one of her most treasured roles". Following Lopes' death in an automobile accident in La Ceiba, Honduras, in 2002, Reed was interviewed for a BET Tonight episode about her life. Reed said she lived with Lopes three months before her son's birth and was taken care of during her pregnancy. Tren, who had lived with Kurupt for four years before Reed's death, remained with his father. Reed's father said he planned to raise money to help Tren.

== Death ==
On October 26, 2012, the driver of a red Honda Accord struck Reed on the Lawrenceville Highway near Hamilton Road north of Lilburn, Georgia. The driver and the passenger attempted CPR, but Reed was pronounced dead at the Gwinnett Medical Center at 10:59 p.m. (EDT). The Gwinnett County police said that the driver "was determined to be not at fault and there are no charges pending", and they started an investigation into the crash to determine why Reed was in the road. Reed's death was first reported by TMZ the following day, and media outlets incorrectly reported that Reed had died in a hit and run. An obituary, written by Reed's family, was published in The Atlanta Journal-Constitution on October 30. At the time of her death, Reed was living in the StudioPlus Atlanta Peachtree Corners extended stay hotel in Norcross, Georgia. (Note: Reed's mother said that she was living in a hotel during the process of moving into a new home.)

On November 3, a public funeral service, organized by the Willie A. Watkins Funeral Home, was held at the Abundant Life Church in Lithonia, Georgia. Prior to the service, Reed's parents held a press conference in Atlanta to criticize the police investigation. According to their attorney, the police had ignored their requests for information about "the time of incident, exact location, information about the driver and even Reed's personal belongings". Police released a report an hour after the conference was scheduled, responding that "they did not hold back any information".

== Awards and nominations ==
Reed was nominated for several accolades for her work with Blaque. For "808", the trio was nominated for Best R&B/Soul Or Rap New Artist at the 1999 Soul Train Lady of Soul Award; at the 2000 ceremony, they were also nominated for R&B/Soul Album Of The Year, Group, Band Or Duo. "I Do" was nominated for Best Editing In A Video at the 2000 MTV Video Music Awards, and the group won Best New Artist-R&B at the 2000 Billboard Video Awards for "Bring It All To Me". The group was nominated for Best Female Group at the 2001 BET Awards.

== Discography ==
=== Singles ===
Year	Title	Album
2001	"It's Over" (Kurupt featuring Natina Reed)	Space Boogie: Smoke Oddessey

== Filmography ==
List of film and television roles
Title	Year	Medium	Role	Notes
Bring It On	2000	Feature film	Jenelope	Film debut
V.I.P.	2001	TV series	Herself	Episode: "Kayus Ex Machina"
Honey	2003	Feature film	Herself	Cameo appearance
Til 6 in the Morning by Platinum Souls	2008	Television film	Herself	

List of music video appearances
Title	Year	Artist
"Not Tonight"	1997	Lil' Kim
"Welcome To Atlanta"	2001	Ludacris
"It's Over"	2001	Kurupt
