= Blaque Out =

Blaque Out!

Studio album by Blaque
- Released: January 29, 2002
- Recorded: 2000–2001
- Length: 51:05
- Label: Columbia

Blaque chronology
Blaque (1999)	Blaque Out! (2002)	Torch (2019)

Singles from Blaque Out
- 1. "Can't Get It Back" Released: October 29, 2001

Blaque Out is the second studio album by American R&B trio Blaque. Originally expected to be released by Columbia Records in December 2001, it received a Japan-wide physical release on January 29, 2002 only, before finally being released as a digital download through iTunes on May 22, 2007. The band worked with a variety of producers on the album, including Dallas Austin, Full Force, Trackmasters, Salaam Remi, Dru Hill member Nokio, as well as Carl Sturken and Evan Rogers.

The album earned largely lukewarm reviews from music critics who felt it was similar to the group's self-titled debut album (1999) but lacked inspiration. Blaque Out's only single "Can't Get It Back" was released on October 29, 2001, and peaked at number 91 on Billboard's Hot R&B/Hip-Hop Songs chart. In 2003, it was re-recorded by British girl band Mis-Teeq. Group member Natina Reed said that Blaque Out! was both the strongest of the group's three albums and also her personal favorite album.

== Critical reception ==
Professional ratings
Review scores
Source	Rating
AllMusic	2.5/5 stars
Vibe	3/5 stars

AllMusic editor Jason Birchmeier rated the album two and a half out of five stars. He wrote that Blaque Out "finds the urban trio of female vocalists exploring much of the same terrain they explored on their debut album a few years earlier. However, like that album, Blaque Out has its share of lackluster filler. On the album's better moments, the trio co-opt many of the era's more successful trends, sounding often like Destiny's Child and other times like Janet Jackson." Demetria Lucas, writing Vibe, found that "on Blaque Out, Shamari Fears, Brandi Williams, and Natina Reed rely on their predecessor’s platinum-proven formula, creating a solid but seldom inspired sophomore set. Reed rhymes on nearly every track with a voice and flow identical to Left Eye's, which makes for monotony [...] While Blaque Out never ventures into uncharted R&B territory, Blaque still has the recipe for success."

== Release ==
Initially expected to be released in United States on December 11, 2001, Blaque Out was eventually released in Japan in 2002 and finally made it to iTunes in 2007. In a 2012 interview, Natina Reed commented on their record company's decision to shelve the album's physical release in the United States: "I think they missed out the most of being able to identify what Blaque really was at that point [...] This album branched out a little more than the first one did and reached out to many more types of people [...] It was a big record, but we dropped the ball on that record. Whether we did that, it was simply because we were making changes. Me and Kurupt from Tha Dogg Pound were expecting a child at this point and the label did not want to replace me [..] That’s pretty much what happened during that time. It is confusing to the fans, but it was a little bit more personal than people thought it was."

== Track listing ==
Blaque Out! – Physical edition
No.	Title	Writer(s)	Length
1.	"Blaque Out"	Natina Reed; Curtis Bedeau; Gerard Charles; Hugh Clarke; Lucien George, Jr.; Brian George; Paul Anthony George; Char Elizabeth	3:20
2.	"Can't Get It Back"	Reed; Salaam Remi; Marlon Williams; Hernst Bellevue; Aubrey Gravatt; Joseph Freeman; Theodore Life	4:14
3.	"Know What's Up (Ghetto Boys)" (featuring YoungBloodZ)	Reed; Dallas Austin; Debra Killings; Sean Paul; Jeffrey Grigsby	4:11
4.	"Thinkin' About It"	Bedeau; Charles; Clarke; L. George; B. George; P. George; Elizabeth	4:36
5.	"Should I"	Jean-Claude Olivier; Samuel Barnes; Charmelle Cofield	3:16
6.	"Temperature"	Jason Edmonds; Dennis Morehead; Mark Tabb	5:04
7.	"I Love My Group But... (Interlude)"	Reed; Brandi Williams; Shamari Fears	0:39
8.	"Bliss"	Bedeau; Charles; Clarke; L. George; B. George; P. George; Elizabeth	3:31
9.	"I Wanna Be the One"	Reed; Williams; Fears; Carl Sturken; Evan Rogers	3:34
10.	"Questions"	Reed; Williams; Fears; Jasper Cameron; Leslie Brathwaite	4:40
11.	"Girls Like That"	Austin; Killings	3:52
12.	"This Ain't Us"	Edmonds; Beau Dozier	4:07
13.	"Outro"	Reed; Williams; Fears	1:10
Total length:			51:05

Bonus track(s)
No.	Title	Writer(s)	Length
14.	"She Ain't Got That Boom" (808 Remix)	Reed; Robert Kelly; Kandi Burruss; Olivier; Barnes	3:50
15.	"As If"	Guy Roche; Shelly Peiken	3:47

Blaque Out – 2007 iTunes edition
No.	Title	Length
1.	"Blaque Out"	3:20
2.	"Know What's Up" (Alternative Version) (featuring YoungBloodZ)	4:20
3.	"Can't Get It Back" (Trackmasters Remix) (featuring Royce da 5'9")	3:30
4.	"Thinkin' About It" (Alternative Version)	3:58
5.	"Should I"	2:56
6.	"Temperature" (Alternative Version)	5:23
7.	"Bliss"	3:34
8.	"I Wanna Be the One"	3:35
9.	"This Ain't Us"	4:07
10.	"He Said She Said^{[a]}"	4:03
11.	"As If" (Radio Version)	3:45
Total length:		40:07

Notes

- ^{^[a]}After the 2007 iTunes version of the album disappeared from online catalogs in 2008, the album resurfaced via iTunes in 2011 with "He Said She Said" excluded from the album; the track was later released separated as a single on 9 August 2008, renamed "He Say, She Say".

Sample credits

- "Can't Get It Back" samples from the song "We're Going to a Party" (1977) by American R&B singer Evelyn "Champagne" King.
- "Bliss" samples elements from "Wrapped Around Your Finger" (1983) by English rock band The Police.

== Release history ==
Blaque Out release history
Region	Date	Format	Ref.
Japan	January 29, 2002	CD	
United States	May 22, 2007	digital download	
