= Honey (soundtrack) =

Honey: Music from & Inspired by the Motion Picture

Soundtrack album by Various artists
- Released: November 11, 2003
- Recorded: 2003
- Genre: Hip hop R&B
- Length: 57:37
- Label: Elektra Records
- Producer: Various artists

Singles from Honey: Music from & Inspired by the Motion Picture
- 1. "I'm Good" Released: January 7, 2004

Professional ratings
Review scores
Source	Rating
Allmusic	link

Honey: Music from & Inspired by the Motion Picture is the soundtrack to the 2003 film, Honey. It was released on November 11, 2003 through Elektra Records and consisted of a blend of hip hop and R&B music. The soundtrack peaked at 105 on the Billboard 200, 47 on the Top R&B/Hip-Hop Albums and 6 on the Top Soundtracks. Several artists were featured on it, including Missy Elliott, Fabolous, Sean Paul, Amerie, Nate Dogg, Mark Ronson, Blaque, Jadakiss, and Yolanda Adams.

== Track listing ==
1. "Hurt Sumthin" – 3:32 (Missy Elliott)
2. "I'm Good" – 3:35 (Blaque)
3. "Gimme the Light" – 3:47 (Sean Paul)
4. "React" – 3:39 (Erick Sermon featuring Redman)
5. "Leave Her Alone" – 4:08 (Nate Dogg featuring Memphis Bleek, Freeway and Young Chris)
6. "Ooh Wee" – 3:29 (Mark Ronson featuring Ghostface Killah, Nate Dogg, Trife and Saigon)
7. "It's a Party" – 3:23 (Tamia)
8. "Thugman" – 3:44 (Tweet featuring Missy Elliott)
9. "Now Ride" – 2:51 (Fabolous)
10. "J-A-D-A" – 3:44 (Jadakiss and Sheek)
11. "Think of You" – 3:47 (Amerie)
12. "Closer" – 3:50 (Goapele)
13. "I Believe" – 3:45 (Yolanda Adams)

== Charts ==
Chart (2003–04)	Peak position
Australian Albums (ARIA)	12
Austrian Albums (Ö3 Austria)	34
Belgian Albums (Ultratop Flanders)	65
Belgian Albums (Ultratop Wallonia)	69
Canadian Albums (Billboard)	60
Dutch Albums (Album Top 100)	89
French Albums (SNEP)	63
German Albums (Offizielle Top 100)	7
New Zealand Albums (RMNZ)	15
Swiss Albums (Schweizer Hitparade)	2
US Billboard 200	105
US Top R&B/Hip-Hop Albums (Billboard)	47

== Certifications ==
Region	Certification	Certified units/sales
Australia (ARIA)	Platinum	70,000^{^}
^{^} Shipments figures based on certification alone.
