= Blaque by Popular Demand =

Blaque

Compilation album by Blaque
- Released: February 27, 2007
- Genres: R&B, pop, hip hop
- Length: 37:06
- Label: Sbme Special Mkts.

Blaque By Popular Demand is a ten track compilation album of Blaque's most popular songs. It was originally meant to be the full second album of the group, but was turned into a compilation album during production. Some of the group's hit singles, ("808", "As If", "Bring It All to Me", and "Can't Get It Back") along with four selected tracks from their self-titled debut album and two remixes were featured on the compilation. Physical copies of the compilation were released to selected marketing stores such as Circuit City and were sold online via Amazon.

== Track listing ==
#	Title	Time
1.	"Bring It All to Me (Main Version)" ^{1}	3:47
2.	"808"	4:15
3.	"As If"	3:47
4.	"I Do (Track Masters Remix)" ^{2}	2:53
5.	"Can't Get It Back" ^{3}	4:09
6.	"Roll With Me"	3:42
7.	"Rainbow Drive"	3:48
8.	"Right Next to Me"	5:29
9.	"Time After Time"	4:06
10.	"Bring It All to Me (Remix) (featuring 50 Cent)"	4:10

^{3} Radio edit
