= Eye Legacy =

Compilation album / Remix album by Lisa "Left Eye" Lopes
- Released: January 27, 2009
- Recorded: 1998–2002 (Lisa "Left Eye" Lopes' vocals); 2008 (Production, guest vocals, and mixing)
- Genres: Pop-rap; hip hop; R&B
- Length: 56:11
- Labels: Mass Appeal Entertainment; eOne
- Producers: The Heavyweights, Reigndrop Lopes, Wanda Lopes, Marcus DL, Panauh Kalayeh, Danny Keyz, Surefire Music Group, Andrew Lane

Lisa "Left Eye" Lopes chronology
Supernova (2001)	Eye Legacy (2009)	Forever... The EP (2009)

Singles from Eye Legacy
- 1. "Crank It" Released: October 8, 2008; 2. "Let's Just Do It" Released: January 13, 2009; 3. "Block Party" Released: April 16, 2009 (re-release)

Eye Legacy is the second and final studio album by rapper Lisa "Left Eye" Lopes and is her first posthumous release. Released on January 27, 2009, the album contains previously unreleased songs, and remixed songs from Supernova, featuring new production with guest artists.

== Background ==
Originally set to be released October 28, 2008, the release date was pushed back to November 11, then to January 27, 2009. The album includes a bonus DVD of previously unreleased footage of Lisa. The album booklet also contains fan messages that were collected through the official Eye Legacy MySpace page. A percentage of the proceeds from the album sales went to the Lisa Lopes Foundation and her orphanage in Honduras. Guest appearances include: Chamillionaire, Bone Crusher, Missy Elliott, Bobby Valentino, TLC, Wanya Morris, Lil Mama, Reigndrop Lopes, Shamari Devoe, Free, Ryan Toby, and Claudette Ortiz. Eye Legacy sold 2,550 copies in its first week of release, just barely missing the Billboard 200, however, it debuted at #15 on the Billboard Top Rap Albums, #44 on the Billboard Top R&B/Hip-Hop Albums and #30 on the Billboard Top Independent Albums. The album dropped to 18 in its second week on the Top Rap Albums chart, to 54 on the R&B albums chart and also out of the top 25 on the Independent chart. The following week the album dropped out of the Rap and Independent charts altogether and down to 99 on the R&B chart. It spent 6 weeks on the R&B albums chart, 4 on the Rap albums and 1 on the Independent.

== Singles ==
- "Crank It" was released on the internet as a promo single.
- "Let's Just Do It", the first official single, features TLC and Missy Elliott. It was sent to American radio in November 2008. The song was digitally released on January 13, 2009 in North America.
- "Block Party", which features Lil Mama, was announced on the Official Mass Appeal YouTube as the second single. The single went to number 1 on the Jamster "What's New" Ringtones chart.

== Reception ==
Professional ratings
Aggregate scores
Source	Rating
Metacritic	48/100
Review scores
Source	Rating
Entertainment Weekly	(C−)
AllMusic	3/5 stars
The Phoenix	1.5/5 stars
Spin	2/5 stars
Toronto Star	2/4 stars
The Washington Post	(mixed)
XXL	(L)

Initial critical response to Eye Legacy was mixed. At Metacritic, which assigns a normalized rating out of 100 to reviews from mainstream critics, the album has received an average score of 48 based on 5 reviews. Entertainment Weekly called the album "...another posthumous compilation matching a much-missed talent's unused vocals (...) with tinny new beats and random guests". Spin said: "Lopes' complex flow rarely sits comfortably in the harder cuts, original guests Tupac Shakur and Esthero have vanished, and the introspection of this unconventional artist's final years too often gets obscured by the updated glitz." The Phoenix called Left Eye "a spunky studio presence". AllMusic stated: "One of the natural reactions to a release like this — studio scraps and otherwise unfinished material reanimated with new productions and patched-in guest spots, all for the sake of a "new album" from a late artist — is, of course, horror". The Washington Post released a statement saying" Lopes was firecracker-smart, controversy-prone and given to bouts of mysticism. Eye Legacy is powered by the sheer force of her personality, for better or worse. It's a glass-jawed mix of swaggery, rough-edged hip-pop, cool come-ons, non-specific spiritual allusions and go-girl affirmations that can seem one-note and brittle without the ameliorating influence of Lopes's cooler-headed group mates." Urban Music Scene said "This CD is raw, gritty, truthful, and dripping with a deep, southern groove. Lisa brings a style and flavor to all her songs. From the head-nodding 'Spread Your Wings' to the club-bangers 'Bounce' featuring Chamillionaire and Bone Crusher, and 'Crank It' featuring Lisa's sister, Reigndrop, who sounds just like Lisa."

== Track listing ==
All tracks produced by Surefire Music Group and Marcus DL, except where noted.

No.	Title	Producer(s)	Length
1.	"Spread Your Wings" (featuring Free)	The Heavy Weights; Marcus DL	3:51
2.	"In the Life" (featuring Bobby V)		3:46
3.	"Legendary"		3:26
4.	"Let's Just Do It" (featuring TLC and Missy Elliott)	The Heavy Weights; Marcus DL	3:37
5.	"Block Party" (featuring Lil Mama)		4:17
6.	"Listen"	Panauh Kalayeh, Danny Keys, Reigndrop Lopes	4:20
7.	"Bounce" (featuring Chamillionaire and Bone Crusher)		4:14
8.	"Let It Out" (featuring Wanya Morris of Boyz II Men)		4:47
9.	"Through the Pain" (featuring Ryan Toby and Claudette Ortiz of City High)		3:59
10.	"Forever"		4:28
11.	"Neva Will Eye Eva" (featuring Raina "Reigndrop" Lopes)	Andrew Lane, Reigndrop Lopes, Panauh Kalayeh	3:40
12.	"L.I.S.A."		4:20
13.	"Let's Just Do It (Remix)" (featuring TLC and Missy Elliott)		3:35
14.	"Crank It" (featuring Reigndrop Lopes and Ebony Love)		4:00
15.	"Block Party (Remix)" (featuring Lil Mama; iTunes bonus)		4:03

UK edition
No.	Title	Length
10.	"Forever (Remix)" (featuring Shamari Fears of Blaque)	3:58
13.	"By the Way" (performed by Egypt)	4:47
14.	"Crank It" (featuring Reigndrop Lopes)	4:00
15.	"Crank It (HWT Remix)" (featuring Reigndrop Lopes and Ebony Love)	3:52

Japan edition
No.	Title	Length
10.	"Forever (Remix)" (featuring Shamari Fears of Blaque)	3:58
13.	"Cherry Cherry"	4:02
14.	"Let's Just Do It (Japan Remix)" (featuring Missy Elliott and TLC)	3:39
15.	"Crank It" (featuring Reigndrop Lopes and Ebony Love)	4:00

- Note: The Japanese remix of "Let's Just Do It" uses the instrumental from the original FanMail demo.
- Note: Several bonus tracks were released as the EP Forever... The EP.

== Remixes ==
The majority of songs on Eye Legacy are remixed versions of songs from Lopes' 2001 release, Supernova.

- "Spread Your Wings" ("Life Is Like a Park")
- "In the Life" ("Rags to Riches")
- "Legendary" ("Untouchable")
- "Block Party" ("The Block Party")
- "Listen" ("The Universal Quest")
- "Let It Out" ("Tampered With", originally the B-side of "The Block Party" single)
- "Forever" ("Friends", originally the Japan-exclusive track on Supernova)
- "L.I.S.A." ("Let Me Live")

== Charts ==
Chart (2009)	Peak position
Billboard Top R&B/Hip-Hop Albums	44
Billboard Top Rap Albums	15
Billboard Independent Albums	30
