= Forever... The EP =

EP by Lisa "Left Eye" Lopes
- Released: November 3, 2009
- Recorded: 1998–2008
- Genre: Hip hop; pop-rap; R&B
- Length: 20:43
- Label: Mass Appeal Entertainment
- Producer: The Heavyweights, Reigndrop Lopes, Wanda Lopes, Marcus DL, Surefire Music Group

Lisa "Left Eye" Lopes chronology
Eye Legacy (2009)	Forever... The EP (2009)	Reigndrops in My LeftEye (2013)

Forever... The EP is an EP containing several international bonus tracks from Lisa "Left Eye" Lopes's remix/studio album Eye Legacy. It was released to eMusic and is available from iTunes in Australia.

== Track listing ==
No.	Title	Origin	Length
1.	"Forever (Remix)" (featuring Shamari DeVoe)	Used in place of original version on American edition	3:58
2.	"By the Way" (by Egypt)	UK	4:47
3.	"Cherry Cherry (Remix)"	Japan	4:02
4.	"Crank It (HWT Remix)" (featuring Reigndrop Lopes)	UK	3:52
5.	"Block Party (Remix)" (featuring Lil Mama)	iTunes	4:04
