= 808 (Blaque song) =

Single by Blaque

from the album Blaque
- Released: March 9, 1999
- Genre: R&B
- Length: 5:06 (album version); 4:14 (radio edit)
- Label: Columbia; Trackmasters
- Songwriters: R. Kelly; Natina Reed; Poke & Tone; Kandi Burruss (remix)
- Producers: R. Kelly; Trackmasters; Cory Rooney

Blaque singles chronology
"808" (1999)	"I Do" (1999)

"808" is the debut single by American R&B/pop girl group Blaque from their self-titled debut album. Released to radio and music video stations in early 1999, "808" became the group's first top-10 hit in the United States, peaking at number eight on the Billboard Hot 100 and reaching top five on the Billboard Hot R&B/Hip-Hop Singles chart.

== Composition ==
"808" is described as a sexy, tough, and bass-throbbing R&B slow jam and it was co-written by the late group-member Natina Reed and R. Kelly, with the former co-producing. The song has lyrical content referencing 808 drum machines such as "boom-baby-boom" mimicking the song's drum patterns. It runs at a tempo of 122 beats per minutes in the key of C# major.

The remix for "808" was solely produced by Trackmasters and switched the original into an uptempo song with a sample of LL Cool J's "Going Back to Cali". With the exception of the rap during the bridge, the remix is a completely new song written by Kandi Burruss, who also provided background vocals. This version of the song received mainstream pop airplay in early 2000.

== Music video ==
The music video for "808" was directed by Martin Weisz.

It starts with a zoom in into a reel-to-reel tape recorder before fading into a rocky, monochromatic classroom setting with Natina standing at a lectern rapping her spoken intro. Brandi and Shamari magically appear into the classroom sitting down. When the members are singing at the podium, there are multiple tv screens behind them broadcasting other shots of them. After the first chorus, Blaque are individually shown in a recording booth type setting with anechoic chamber-like wall paddings. In this setting there appears to be zero gravity as the ladies are seen floating and flying in the air. They are also seen floating and teleporting in and out of the podium setting.

Lisa "Left Eye" Lopes makes a cameo appearance in the video, appearing in the classroom setting and on the many tv screens. There also appears to be multiple duplicates of her.

It premiered on BET the week ending on February 21, 1999 and on The Box the week after. It later debuted on MTV the week ending May 16, 1999.

The wardrobe and concept for the video was said to be inspired by the futuristic aesthetic of the 1997 film The Fifth Element.

== Track listing ==
CD single
No.	Title	Length
1.	"808" (LP version)
2.	"808" (instrumental)
3.	"808" (remix)
4.	"808" (extended remix)
5.	"808" (remix instrumental)

== Charts ==
=== Weekly charts ===
Chart (1999)	Peak position
Australia (ARIA)	68
Canada Dance/Urban (RPM)	30
New Zealand (Recorded Music NZ)	6
Scottish Singles Sales (Official Charts)	93
UK Singles (Official Charts)	31
UK Dance (Official Charts)	26
UK Hip Hop/R&B (Official Charts)	5
US Billboard Hot 100	8
US Hot R&B/Hip-Hop Songs (Billboard)	4
US Rhythmic Airplay (Billboard)	4

=== Year-end charts ===
Chart (1999)	Position
US Billboard Hot 100	50
US Hot R&B/Hip-Hop Songs (Billboard)	17

== Certifications ==
Region	Certification	Certified units/sales
United States (RIAA)	Gold	700,000

== Release history ==
Region	Date	Format(s)	Label(s)	Ref.
United States	March 9, 1999	Cassette	Columbia; Trackmasters	
United States	March 15, 1999	Urban contemporary radio	Columbia; Trackmasters	
United States	March 16, 1999	Rhythmic contemporary radio	Columbia; Trackmasters	
United States	March 23, 1999	CD	Columbia; Trackmasters	
United States	April 27, 1999	Maxi-CD · 12-inch vinyl	Columbia; Trackmasters	
United Kingdom	June 21, 1999	12-inch vinyl; CD; cassette	Columbia; Trackmasters	
