= The Block Party (Lisa Lopes song) =

2001 single by Lisa "Left Eye" Lopes

Single by Lisa Lopes

from the album Supernova
- B-side: "Tampered With"; "Friends"
- Released: July 24, 2001
- Studio: Sony Music Studios (New York City)
- Genre: Hip hop; avant-garde
- Length: 4:05
- Label: Arista
- Songwriters: Lisa Lopes; Salaam Remi; Maurice White; Tracey Horton
- Producer: Salaam Remi

Lisa Lopes singles chronology
"Never Be the Same Again" (2000)	"The Block Party" (2001)	"Let's Just Do It" (2009)

Music video
- "The Block Party" on YouTube

"The Block Party" is the debut solo single by American rapper Lisa "Left Eye" Lopes, a member of the girl group TLC. The track was written by Lopes, Salaam Remi, Maurice White, and Tracey Horton, with Remi providing production. The track was first released on July 24, 2001, to American radio as the only single from her first solo album Supernova (2001), which would only be released internationally. A sample of Earth, Wind & Fire's song "Drum Song" is played throughout the track.

The song received a mixed reception both critically and commercially. While it would crack the top twenty in the United Kingdom and the top-forty in Scotland and the Netherlands, it failed to garner any success in the United States, leading to the cancellation of a planned US-release of Supernova.

== Critical reception ==
Colin Finan of Billboard gave the song a mixed-to-unfavorable review, criticizing the lack of a hook and the "sound of whining voices repeating."

== Chart performance ==
"The Block Party" was a commercial failure in the United States, failing to enter any charts in the country. The track would experience its biggest success in the United Kingdom, where it peaked at number 16 on the UK Singles Chart and spent 5 weeks in total on the chart.

== Music video ==
The music video was directed by Hype Williams and Lopes and was shot on July 10, 2001. Lopes said of the video, "We are in the wonderful world of Left Eye and it's in my galaxy, Supernova." Her adopted daughter Snow appeared in the video. The video was released in October 2001 on MTV UK and The Box. It was not released to North America.

== Track listing ==
European and Australian maxi single

1. "The Block Party" (Radio Mix) – 4:05
2. "The Block Party" (Dallas Austin Remix) – 3:54
3. "Friends" (featuring Cassandra Lucas) – 4:45
4. "Tampered With" (featuring Wanya Morris and Shamari Fears) – 4:36

UK CD single

1. "The Block Party" (Radio Mix) – 4:05
2. "The Block Party" (Dallas Austin Remix) – 3:54
3. "Friends" (featuring Cassandra Lucas) – 4:45
4. "The Block Party" (music video - enhanced interactive element)

UK cassette single

1. "The Block Party" (Radio Mix) – 4:05
2. "Friends" (featuring Cassandra Lucas) – 4:45

== Charts ==
Weekly chart performance for "The Block Party"
Chart (2001)	Peak position
Australia (ARIA)	41
Europe (European Hot 100 Singles)	57
Netherlands (Dutch Top 40)	30
Netherlands (Single Top 100)	47
Scottish Singles Sales (Official Charts)	26
UK Singles (Official Charts)	16
UK Hip Hop/R&B (Official Charts)	9
US Bubbling Under R&B/Hip-Hop Singles (Billboard)	21

== Release history ==
Release dates and format(s) for "The Block Party"
Region	Date	Format(s)	Label(s)	Ref.
United States	July 24, 2001	Contemporary hit; rhythmic contemporary; urban contemporary radio	Arista	
United Kingdom	October 15, 2001	CD; cassette single	LaFace; Arista	
Australia	October 29, 2001	CD single	Arista	

== 2009 version ==
"Block Party"

Single by Lisa Lopes featuring Lil Mama

from the album Eye Legacy
- Released: April 16, 2009 (ringtone)
- Genre: Hip hop
- Length: 4:20
- Label: Mass Appeal Entertainment/Koch Records
- Songwriters: Salaam Remi, Lisa Lopes, Niatia Kirkland
- Producers: Marcus DL, Surefire Music Group

Lisa Lopes singles chronology
"Let's Just Do It" (2009)	"Block Party" (2009)

Lil Mama singles chronology
"What It Is (Strike a Pose)" (2008)	"Block Party" (2009)

"Block Party" is the second posthumous single by the late rapper Lisa Lopes and is the second single from her first posthumous album, Eye Legacy and her third solo single.

=== History ===
The song was originally recorded for Lopes' solo debut Supernova and was released as the album's first and only single. The song was reworked and remixed for her first posthumous album, Eye Legacy, and features Lil Mama. After the first single "Let's Just Do It" failed to chart in the United States, "Block Party" was announced to be released as the second single after its positive critical reception. The song was not released as a single, but rather as a ringtone, along with all the songs of Eye Legacy.
