= Let's Just Do It =

Single by Lisa Lopes featuring Missy Elliott and TLC

from the album Eye Legacy
- Released: January 13, 2009
- Recorded: 1998 (original version); 2008 (album version)
- Genre: Pop-rap; dance
- Length: 3:37 (album version); 4:47 (original version)
- Label: Mass Appeal Entertainment; Koch Records
- Songwriters: M. Allen; M. Elliott; L. Lopes; M. Siskind; M. Sparkman
- Producers: Marcus DL; The Heavy Weights

Lisa Lopes singles chronology
"The Block Party" (2001)	"Let's Just Do It" (2009)	"Block Party" (2009)

Missy Elliott singles chronology
"Whatcha Think About That" (2008)	"Let's Just Do It" (2009)	"Work" (2009)

TLC singles chronology
"I Bet" (2005)	"Let's Just Do It" (2009)	"Crooked Smile" (2013)

Audio video
- "Let's Just Do It" on YouTube

"Let's Just Do It" is a posthumous single by American rapper Lisa "Left Eye" Lopes, and is the lead single from her second studio album and first posthumous album, Eye Legacy. Originally recorded by Lopes and her TLC groupmate Tionne "T-Boz" Watkins in 1998 for the group's third studio album FanMail, the track was shelved until 2009, when it was remixed to feature new vocals from fellow member Rozonda "Chilli" Thomas and rapper Missy Elliott.

== Background ==
The song was originally produced by Dwight Reynolds and recorded in 1998 by Lopes and Watkins for possible inclusion in the 1999 multi-platinum FanMail. The song was left off the album as the hip hop beats did not fit the album's concept, as LaFace Records chose to have the album focus on futuristic electronic production.

In 2008, when Eye Legacy began production, "Let's Just Do It" was selected to be included on the album and be released as the lead single. Elliott and Thomas recorded new vocals on the song, and the track was remixed with a dance beat.

On June 2, 2014, a new version of the song was released that featured a new beat and rap from Lopes' younger sister Reigndrop Lopes.

== Reception ==
"Let's Just Do It" received a positive review from Billboard magazine: "The energy that made the trio's upbeat singles international smashes is evident here, along with Lisa's essence—a reminder that TLC was among the most successful female R&B groups of all time. Originally recorded in 1998, the Heavy Weights and Marcus DL's production builds a catchy and contemporary rhythmic structure."

== Chart performance ==
The track sold fewer than 1,000 downloads during the week of the single's release, according to Nielsen SoundScan. Because of this, the song failed to chart in the US Billboard charts and failed to be released worldwide.

== Release history ==
Country	Date	Label	Format
United States	November 5, 2008	Mass Appeal Entertainment/Koch Records	Radio
United States	January 13, 2009	Mass Appeal Entertainment/Koch Records	Digital download

== Versions ==
- Original version (featuring T-Boz) – 4:47
- Album version (featuring Missy Elliott and TLC) – 3:37
- Album/Urban remix (featuring Missy Elliott and TLC) – 3:35
- Japan remix (featuring Missy Elliott and TLC) – 3:39
- EyeReignMix (featuring Missy Elliott, TLC and Reigndrop Lopes) – 3:46
