= Bring It On (film) =

2000 film directed by Peyton Reed

- Theatrical release poster
- Directed by: Peyton Reed
- Written by: Jessica Bendinger
- Produced by: Marc Abraham; Thomas Bliss
- Starring: Kirsten Dunst; Eliza Dushku; Jesse Bradford; Gabrielle Union
- Cinematography: Shawn Maurer
- Edited by: Larry Bock
- Music by: Christophe Beck
- Production company: Beacon Pictures
- Distributed by: Universal Pictures (United States); Buena Vista Film Sales (International)
- Release date: August 25, 2000
- Running time: 99 minutes
- Country: United States
- Language: English
- Budget: $11 million
- Box office: $90.5 million

Bring It On is a 2000 American teen comedy film directed by Peyton Reed (in his theatrical film directing debut) and written by Jessica Bendinger. The film stars Kirsten Dunst, Eliza Dushku, Jesse Bradford, and Gabrielle Union. The plot of the film centers on two high-school cheerleading teams' preparation for a national competition.

Bring It On was released in theaters in North America on August 25, 2000, and became a box office success. The film opened at the number 1 spot in North American theaters and remained in the position for two consecutive weeks, earning a worldwide gross of approximately $90 million. The film received generally positive reviews and has become a cult classic.

It is the first of the Bring It On film series and was followed by six direct-to-video sequels, none of which contains any of the original cast members: Bring It On Again (2004), which shared producers with the original, Bring It On: All or Nothing (2006), Bring It On: In It to Win It (2007), Bring It On: Fight to the Finish (2009), Bring It On: Worldwide Cheersmack (2017), and the TV film, Bring It On: Cheer or Die (2022).

== Plot ==
Cheerleader Torrance Shipman is a senior at Rancho Carne High School in San Diego. Her boyfriend, Aaron, is at college at Cal State Dominguez Hills, and her cheerleading squad, the Toros, is aiming for a sixth consecutive national title. Torrance is elected team captain after her highly successful predecessor "Big Red" graduates. In her first practice as captain, one of her teammates, Carver, is injured and must sit out the season. Missy Pantone, a skilled gymnast who transferred from Los Angeles with her brother, Cliff, replaces her.

Missy accuses the Toros of plagiarizing their cheers and takes Torrance to L.A. to watch the routine of the rival East Compton Clovers. Isis, their captain, confronts them and confirms Big Red videotaped and adopted the Clovers' routines for the Toros. Lacking funds to compete in previous years, the Clovers vow to beat the Toros in the national competition. Torrance worries she is cursed after dropping the Spirit Stick, traditionally never supposed to touch the ground, during a dare at summer cheer camp. Torrance and Cliff develop a mutual attraction as Aaron becomes more distant.

Torrance confesses to the Toros about the stolen routines, and they vote to use the current routine, but Isis and her teammates mock it at the next home game, humiliating them. The team raises money via a car wash and hires choreographer Sparky Polastri, who puts the team on a diet and mistreats them. At Regionals, another team performs the new routine Sparky taught the Toros. Officials explain to Torrance that their choreographer provided the same routine for six other teams. Because of this misunderstanding (and as defending champions), the Toros are granted a place in the national competition in Daytona Beach. Big Red questions Torrance's leadership. After Torrance fires Big Red, she begins to doubt herself.

Aaron recommends Torrance step down as captain and considers selling her out to her team rivals Courtney and Whitney. When Cliff sees Torrance and Aaron together kissing, he severs his friendship with her. Torrance breaks up with Aaron (especially after discovering he had been cheating on her), draws on Cliff's past encouragement, and finds inspiration in a mixtape he made for her. When the Toros learn the Clovers lack the money to attend nationals, Torrance asks her father's company to sponsor the team. Isis refuses, and the Clovers obtain the funds by writing a local talk show host.

The Toros and the Clovers reach the finals, and Cliff appears unexpectedly to cheer them on. The Clovers emerge victorious, with the Toros coming in second. The two squads depart with newfound respect for each other. Isis compliments Torrance's leadership, and Torrance admits the Clovers deserved their victory. As the Toros celebrate another successful season, Cliff and Torrance share a kiss.

== Cast ==
- Kirsten Dunst as Torrance Shipman, a driven and principled girl who becomes cheer captain of the Toros at the beginning of the movie. She later develops feelings for Cliff, Missy's brother.
- Eliza Dushku as Missy Pantone, a headstrong gymnast who recently transferred to Rancho Carne High School and decided to try out for the cheerleading squad since there is no gymnastics team at the school. She becomes close friends with Torrance and is the sister of Cliff.
- Jesse Bradford as Cliff Pantone, a music-loving, edgy boy who is Missy's brother and the love interest of Torrance.
- Gabrielle Union as Isis, a confident, poised, and ambitious girl who is the new captain of the Clovers cheer squad at East Compton High School. She vows to get the team to Nationals under her lead since they have never been able to in the past, due to both a lack of school funding and the Toros stealing their routines.
- Clare Kramer as Courtney Egbert, an outspoken, catty girl, member of the Toros, and Whitney's best friend.
- Nicole Bilderback as Whitney Dow, a mouthy girl, member of the Toros, and Courtney's best friend.
- Tsianina Joelson as Darcy, a rich girl whose dad usually pays for team functions. She is a member of the Toros.
- Rini Bell as Kasey, a shy, soft-spoken girl who is a member of the Toros.
- Nathan West as Jan, a handsy and overly sexual boy who constantly gets teased for being a male cheerleader, though he is straight. He is a member of the Toros.
- Huntley Ritter as Les, a gay male cheerleader and a member of the Toros.
- Shamari Fears as Lava, a sassy girl who is a member of the Clovers.
- Natina Reed as Jenelope, a Clovers cheerleader.
- Brandi Williams as LaFred, a Clovers cheerleader.
- Richard Hillman as Aaron, Torrance's boyfriend. He was a male cheerleader for the Toros before graduating and moving to college at the beginning of the movie. Torrance later dumps him finding that he's been cheating on her.
- Lindsay Sloane as "Big Red", the former captain of the Toros. Torrance later finds out she copied their dance routine for Nationals from the Clovers.
- Bianca Kajlich as Carver, a Toros cheerleader who gets injured and replaced at the beginning of the movie.
- Holmes Osborne as Bruce Shipman, Torrance's father.
- Sherry Hursey as Christine Shipman, Torrance's mother.
- Cody McMains as Justin Shipman, Torrance's annoying little brother.
- Ian Roberts as "Sparky" Polastri, an infamous choreographer who teaches multiple schools the same routine including "The Spirit Fingers".
- Ryan Drummond as Theatre Boy
- Peyton Reed cameos as a mime (credited as "Silencio Por Favor").

== Production ==
=== Development ===
Jessica Bendinger, a former journalist and music video director, originally pitched the idea for the film, then titled Cheer Fever, as "Clueless meets Strictly Ballroom set at the National High School Cheerleading Championships", saying she was obsessed with cheerleading competitions on ESPN. Bendinger said the idea combined her love for hip-hop and cheerleading.

The film's depiction of cultural appropriation was informed by Bendinger's experiences as a white writer covering hip-hop artists at music magazine Spin, a predominantly white publication. Said Bendinger: "Having seen white kids emulating hip hop moves at those [cheer] competitions, I thought, 'Well, what if.' I started asking what if questions...until I got to, what if the best team in the country had been stealing their routines? What if that squad they'd been stealing from finally came to show up and compete for their crown?"

Bendinger's pitch was passed over 28 times before finding a home at Beacon Pictures.

Marc Abraham and Thomas Bliss came on board to produce the film, as well as director Peyton Reed who had previously helmed two made-for-television films for Walt Disney.

=== Casting ===
Prior to auditioning for the film, actors were expected to have a cheer prepared. To avoid the use of stunt doubles, Reed required all the actors to participate in a four-week cheerleading camp. Reed and Gabrielle Union met numerous times to discuss the best way to approach her character. "I think she was able to find what was cool about that character, in a way, I doubt other actresses could. Whenever she's on the screen she has this charisma," Reed said of Union.

James Franco and Jason Schwartzman both auditioned for the role of Cliff Pantone. Kirsten Dunst originally turned down the role of Torrance Shipman as she was not interested. Marley Shelton was the second choice for the role but she decided to star in the film Sugar & Spice instead.

=== Filming ===
While editing the film, Reed and editor Larry Bock watched cheerleading exploitation films from the 1970s. The movie clip shown to the cheer team during the 'types of dance inspiration' montage is from Sweet Charity.

Most of the scenes in the film were shot in different locations and high schools in San Diego County, California, as well as San Diego State University. Local high school cheer squads were used as extras.

== Reception ==
=== Box office ===
Bring It On was released in North America on August 25, 2000. The film grossed $17,362,105 in 2,380 theaters during its opening weekend, ranking first at the North American box office, beating The Cell and The Art of War. Although it experienced an 34% decline in gross earnings, the film held the top position for a second consecutive week. The film went on to gross $68,379,000 in North America and an additional $22,070,929 in other territories for a total gross of $90,449,929.

=== Critical response ===
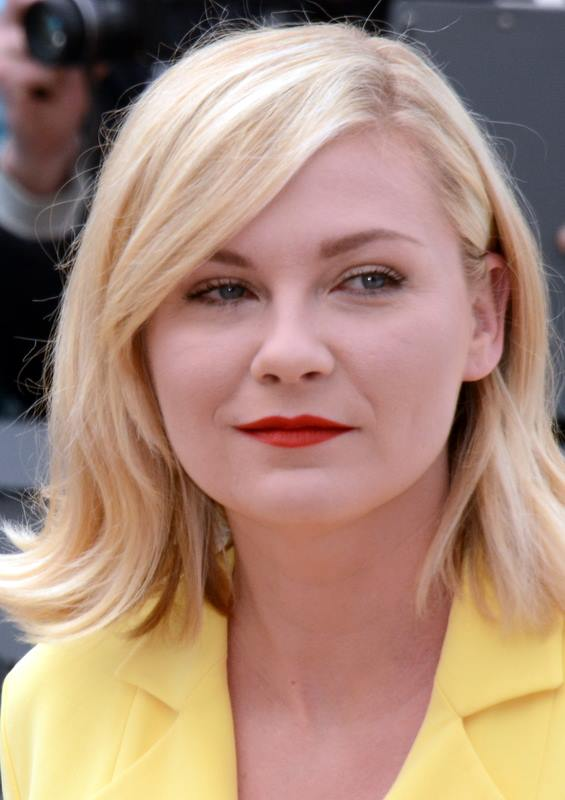
Many critics felt the film displayed Dunst's range as an actress.

The film received a 65% approval rating on Rotten Tomatoes based on 124 reviews, with an average rating of 6.00/10. The site's consensus reads: "Despite the formulaic fluffy storyline, this movie is surprisingly fun to watch, mostly due to its high energy and how it humorously spoofs cheerleading." On Metacritic, the film has a weighted average score of 52 out of 100, based on 31 reviews, indicating "mixed or average" reviews. Audiences surveyed by CinemaScore gave the film a grade B+ on scale of A to F.

A. O. Scott from The New York Times commended the film for the ability to "gesture toward serious matters of racial/economic inequality", as well as for its "occasional snarl of genuine satire". Kevin Thomas of the Los Angeles Times also favored the film, calling it a "Smart and sassy high school movie fun for all ages." In addition, Thomas commended the film for how it "subversively suggests that sometimes there are more important values in life than winning", as well as for its inclusion of a gay cheerleader character who is comfortable in his sexuality. Kim Morgan of The Oregonian dubbed the film the "newest, and probably first, cheerleading movie." Michael O'Sullivan of The Washington Post also gave a positive review, praising the film's "tart, taut script by first-time screenwriter Jessica Bendinger" as well as its depiction of teenagers.

However, some reviewers criticized the plot and tone of the film. Roger Ebert from the Chicago Sun-Times disliked how the film's bowdlerizing of crude humor to avoid an R rating resulted in a tonally inconsistent film. Ebert opined, "We get a strange mutant beast, half Nickelodeon movie, half R-rated comedy. It's like kids with potty-mouth playing grownup", and awarded the film two out of four stars.

David Sterritt of The Christian Science Monitor praised the writing, though he also likened the storyline's simplicity to "the average football cheer". Vicky Edwards from the Chicago Tribune found the film "Absurdly unrealistic at times." The Seattle Post-Intelligencer's Paula Nechak concluded the film was "predictable and surprisingly confusing in its ultimate message."

Many critics praised Kirsten Dunst's performance. In his review, A. O. Scott called her "a terrific comic actress, largely because of her great expressive range, and the nimbleness with which she can shift from anxiety to aggression to genuine hurt." Charles Taylor of Salon notes "among contemporary teenage actresses, Dunst is the sunniest imaginable parodist." Jessica Winter from The Village Voice shared this sentiment, commenting "[Dunst] provides the only major element of Bring It On that plays as tweaking parody rather than slick, strident, body-slam churlishness." Peter Stack of the San Francisco Chronicle, despite giving the film an unfavorable review, commended Dunst for her willingness "to be as silly and cloyingly agreeable as it takes to get through a slapdash film."

=== Accolades ===
The film ranked #30 on Entertainment Weekly's list of the 50 Best High School Movies. Roger Ebert recanted his initial negative impression of the film, later referring to Bring It On as the "Citizen Kane of cheerleader movies."

== Legacy ==
=== Cultural impact ===
In the years since its release, Bring It On has been lauded for being a rare teen film to address issues of systemic inequality, cultural appropriation, and intersectional feminism, which are seen as major factors for the film's continued legacy.

Beatrice Hazlehurst of i-D wrote, "While its racial inclusion — especially among primary characters — already put the film far ahead of its time, the dynamics of social strata woven throughout the tapestry of Bring It On allow it to hold up so well 20 years later. By wrapping its arms narratively around 'not only people of color, but queer kids and kids who might feel othered,' Bendinger says Bring It On offered the overlooked and ostracized the chance to see themselves on screen."

This was echoed by actor Jesse Bradford: "[The movie] managed to shine a light on problems like appropriation and white fragility... in light of recent history, Bring It On seems relevant right now."

=== Sequels ===
Bring It On is followed by five direct-to-video sequels and one television film sequel:

- Bring It On Again (2004)
- Bring It On: All or Nothing (2006)
- Bring It On: In It to Win It (2007)
- Bring It On: Fight to the Finish (2009)
- Bring It On: Worldwide Cheersmack (2017)
- Bring It On: Cheer or Die (2022)

The only sequel to feature any of the original filmmaking crew from Bring It On was 2004's Bring It On Again. The producers of the original film did not return for sequels after Bring It On Again, and none of the films share recurring cast members. Steve Rash directed two of the sequels and Alyson Fouse wrote four screenplays. Otherwise, none of the films in the Bring It On franchise share cast or crew.

The five released films following Bring It On share tenuous plot links. The plot of each film typically follows the first film—a competitive cheerleading team changes routines or other elements to win.

=== Stage musical ===
A stage version of the film premiered at the Alliance Theatre, Atlanta, Georgia on January 16, 2011. The musical has music by Lin-Manuel Miranda and Tom Kitt, lyrics by Amanda Green, and a book by Jeff Whitty. The director and choreographer is Andy Blankenbuehler. The cast includes Amanda LaVergne as Campbell, Adrienne Warren as Danielle, and Nick Blaemire as Randall, and "award-winning competitive cheerleaders from across the country".

The Alliance Theatre production was nominated for eight Suzi Bass Awards, winning awards for Choreography (Andy Blankenbuehler), Sound Design (Brian Ronan), and World Premiere Play or Musical. The production was nominated for ten Atlanta Theater Fan Awards from in 2011. The production won for Best Musical and Best Choreography (Andy Blankenbuehler).

A national tour of the musical started at the Ahmanson Theatre in Los Angeles in November–December 2011 and then traveled to San Francisco, Denver, Houston, and Toronto. The national tour stars Taylor Louderman as Campbell and Jason Gotay as Randall. The cast celebrated kicking-off the national tour of the musical on October 22, 2011, by performing skits from the show.

Charles Isherwood of The New York Times wrote of the Ahmanson Theatre production: "After an opening number truly-dazzles as it reveals the cast's impressive gymnastic prowess, the score hits its stride after Campbell transfers to Jackson High. Surging R&B grooves and churning lyrics suggest the fingerprints of Mr. Miranda ... the dance numbers for the Jackson crowd kick the musical into high-gear for most of the first act.... Like most entertainments about the trials and triumphs of the teenage years, 'Bring It On' has as much sap as it does pep in its DNA, distinguished primarily by the electrifying dance routines and the elaborate cheer-squad performances."

The musical opened on Broadway at the St. James Theatre, in a limited run, starting on July 12, 2012, in previews, and officially on August 1 through December 30, 2012.

== Home media ==
Bring It On was released on VHS and DVD on February 13, 2001, and on Blu-ray on July 1, 2014. It was released on Ultra HD Blu-ray and a remastered Blu-ray by Shout! Factory on June 24, 2025, for the film's 25th anniversary.

== Soundtrack ==
Bring It On: Music from the Motion Picture was released by Epic Records on August 22, 2000. It features multiple tracks from Blaque, who play Clovers cheerleaders in the film. It also includes songs from Daphne & Celeste, 3LW, and a cover of the Toni Basil song "Mickey" by B*Witched.

Bring It On: Music from the Motion Picture

Soundtrack album by Various Artists
- Released: August 22, 2000
- Genres: Pop, hip-hop, pop rock, dance pop
- Length: 47:36
- Label: Epic Records

Singles from Bring It On: Music from the Motion Picture
- 1. "As If" Released: August 1, 2000

No.	Title	Music	Length
1.	"As If"	Blaque feat. Joey Fatone	3:47
2.	"See Ya (Radio Mix)"	Atomic Kitten	2:52
3.	"Mickey"	B*Witched	3:29
4.	"Anywhere USA"	P.Y.T.	4:06
5.	"U.G.L.Y."	Daphne & Celeste	3:24
6.	"Jump Up (If You Feel Alright)"	Da Beat Bros.	4:00
7.	"Freakin' You"	Jungle Brothers	3:36
8.	"Cheer For Me"	95 South	4:37
9.	"What's A Girl To Do (Urban Mix)"	Sister2Sister	2:43
10.	"Bring It All To Me (Remix)"	Blaque feat. 50 Cent	4:08
11.	"'Til I Say So"	3LW	3:57
12.	"2 Can Play That Game"	Sygnature	3:12
13.	"As If"	Blaque	3:45

== See also ==
- List of media set in San Diego
