= Bring It All to Me =

1999 single by Blaque

Single by Blaque featuring *NSYNC

from the album Blaque
- Released: October 11, 1999
- Genre: Teen-R&B
- Length: 3:38 (album version); 3:46 (single version)
- Label: Trackmasters; Columbia
- Songwriters: Billy Lawrence; LeShan Lewis; William Shelby; Kevin Spencer; Nidra Sylvers; Cory Rooney; Violet Ruby; Linda Van Horssen
- Producers: L.E.S.; Cory Rooney

Blaque singles chronology
"I Do" (1999)	"Bring It All to Me" (1999)	"As If" (2000)

Music video
- "Bring It All to Me" on YouTube

"Bring It All to Me" is a song performed by American R&B girl group Blaque. It was written by Billy Lawrence, Linda Van Horssen, Violet Ruby, Nidra Sylvers, LeShan "L.E.S." Lewis, and Cory Rooney for the band's self-titled debut album (1999), while production was overseen by Lewis and Rooney. The song is built around an interpolation of "I Don't Wanna Be the Last to Know" (1982) by American R&B and soul music vocal group Shalamar. Due to the inclusion of the interpolation, William Shelby and Kevin Spencer are also credited as songwriters on the song.

The album version of the song features JC Chasez of boy band *NSYNC but is credited to the group as a whole. It was released on October 11, 1999, as Blaque's third single in the United States. For the singles international release, Chasez vocals were omitted and replaced with band members, Brandi Williams and Shamari DeVoe. This version was originally released on commercial singles only. A successful single for the group, "Bring It All to Me" reached number five on the US Billboard Hot 100 and topped the Rhythmic Airplay chart for six non-consecutive weeks. It also reached number seven on the Canadian RPM 100 Hit Tracks chart and number 16 on the New Zealand Singles Chart. Billboard named the song number 54 on their list of 100 Greatest Girl Group Songs of All Time.

== Background ==
The song was originally intended to feature singer Usher, but his mother and manager, Jonnetta Patton, who considered Blaque too unknown at the time, opposed the idea. As Blaque shared a manager with boy band NSYNC and toured with the group, there were initial plans to feature band member Justin Timberlake on the track instead. As he was unavailable due to him filming the ABC television film Model Behavior (2000) at the time, the decision was ultimately made to feature JC Chasez. Although only Chasez's voice appears on the song, the entire band is credited as a whole. A remix featuring 50 Cent was featured on the soundtrack to the teen comedy film Bring It On (2000), in which the group star in.

== Composition ==
Musically, "Bring It All to Me" is a silky, slow-and-easy youth-leaning R&B track with a bouncing beat underneath "classy" piano keys. The song was described by music journalist Chuck Taylor of Billboard as sounding "distinctive and like an old-school anthem" and "refreshing" in terms of the track's lyrical content amidst the "male-bashing" anthems from the time. Sheet music for the song is originally published in the key of F major, and moves at a tempo of 89 beats per minute. It also contains a sample of Shalamar’s 1980s single “I Don’t Want to Be the Last to Know”.

== Music video ==
The music video, directed by Bille Woodruff, features a futuristic, sci-fi inspired feel. It shows Blaque as alien girls with superpowers who descend on a Downtown Los Angeles street. Male onlookers find a mysterious box and are transported to a futuristic world where they interact with the women. In this second setting, each member of Blaque is shown in a room with a different color: pink for Natina, green for Brandi, and orange for Shamari. The video is often noted for its influence and included as an example by fashion blogs and magazines for its Afro-futuristic, Y2K aesthetic.

The audio track utilized for the music video features an alternate mix from the standard album version. In this version, the vocals are placed more prominently in the foreground, while the instrumental arrangement and bass frequencies are slightly attenuated. Furthermore, this version omits JC Chasez's vocals, replacing his parts with lines sung by group members Brandi Williams and Shamari Fears. This alternate version also features additional vocal ad-libs from Natina Reed. This version was never been released commercially in pure audio form outside of the video. "Bring It All to Me" premiered on music video stations during autumn of 1999, starting off with MTV the week ending October 10, 1999. BET and The Box soon followed and began airing the week ending October 17, 1999.

== Track listings ==
European CD single

1. "Bring It All to Me" (main version) – 3:46
2. "Bring It All to Me" (remix instrumental) – 4:12

European maxi-CD single

1. "Bring It All to Me" (main version) – 3:46
2. "Bring It All to Me" (remix) featuring 50 Cent – 4:09
3. "Bring It All to Me" (Triple Threat Mix featuring Free, NY Glaze and Jazz-Ming Mackey) – 4:31
4. "Bring It All to Me" (remix instrumental) – 4:12

European 12-inch single

A1. "Bring It All to Me" (remix) featuring 50 Cent – 4:09
A2. "Bring It All to Me" (Triple Threat Mix featuring Free, NY Glaze and Jazz-Ming Mackey) – 4:31
B1. "Bring It All to Me" (remix instrumental) – 4:12
B2. "Bring It All to Me" (Triple Threat Mix instrumental) – 4:32

== Charts ==
=== Weekly charts ===
Weekly chart performance for "Bring It All to Me"
Chart (1999–2000)	Peak position
Canada Top Singles (RPM)	7
Canada Adult Contemporary (RPM)	60
Germany (GfK)	67
Netherlands (Dutch Top 40)	37
Netherlands (Single Top 100)	51
New Zealand (Recorded Music NZ)	16
Switzerland (Schweizer Hitparade)	57
US Billboard Hot 100	5
US Hot R&B/Hip-Hop Songs (Billboard)	15
US Pop Airplay (Billboard)	6
US Rhythmic Airplay (Billboard)	1

=== Year-end charts ===
1999 year-end chart performance for "Bring It All to Me"
Chart (1999)	Position
US Rhythmic Top 40 (Billboard)	40

2000 year-end chart performance for "Bring It All to Me"
Chart (2000)	Position
UK Urban (Music Week)	40
US Billboard Hot 100	30
US Hot R&B/Hip-Hop Singles & Tracks (Billboard)	63
US Mainstream Top 40 (Billboard)	20
US Rhythmic Top 40 (Billboard)	14

== Release history ==
Release dates and formats for "Bring It All to Me"
Region	Date	Format(s)	Label(s)	Ref(s).
United States	October 11, 1999	Urban contemporary radio; contemporary hit radio	Columbia	
United States	October 26, 1999	Urban adult contemporary radio	Columbia	
France	January 31, 2000	Maxi-CD	Sony Music	
Germany	February 8, 2000	Digital download; maxi-CD; 12-inch vinyl	Sony Music	
United Kingdom	March 29, 2000	Maxi-CD; 12-inch vinyl	Sony Music	
Japan	May 23, 2000	Maxi-CD; 12-inch vinyl	SME	
