= Supernova (Lisa Lopes album) =

Studio album by Lisa "Left Eye" Lopes
- Released: August 16, 2001
- Recorded: October 2000 – April 2001
- Genres: Hip hop; experimental hip-hop; pop rap; avant-garde; R&B
- Label: Arista
- Producers: Lisa Lopes; Antonio "LA" Reid; Mark Pitts

Lisa "Left Eye" Lopes chronology
Supernova (2001)	Eye Legacy (2009)

Singles from Supernova
- 1. "The Block Party" Released: July 8, 2001

Professional ratings
Review scores
Source	Rating
AllMusic	2.5/5 stars
MTV Asia	8/10 stars
NME	3/5 stars
Slant Magazine	3.5/5 stars
Yahoo! Music UK	7/10

Supernova is the debut solo studio album by American rapper Lisa Lopes of TLC and is the only one released in her lifetime, prior to her traffic collision-related death in 2002. Despite failing to chart, it generally received positive reviews by the music critics.

== Album information ==
The album's original titles were Fantasy1.com and A New Star Is Born, but was eventually changed to Supernova. The release date for the album was August 16, 2001, the day of her father's birthday, as well as her grandfather's death. This is alluded to in the lyrics of the song "A New Star Is Born". The United States release date was intended to be October 29, 2001, but the album's U.S. release was cancelled due to poor sales overseas.

The album's first single, "The Block Party", was sent to radio in July 2001 and became a top 20 hit in the UK, but failed to chart on the Billboard Hot 100. The second single was to have been "Hot!", however, when the album release was canceled in the United States, all further singles were canceled. Though the album was canceled by Arista, Lopes tried selling the album on her website (Eyenetics), but to no success.

Several tracks from the album were remixed by Death Row Records for Lopes' planned N.I.N.A album. The album was cancelled after Lopes' death, but was leaked online in 2011. Songs from the album were re-released in a remixed form in 2009 as Eye Legacy.

== Track listing ==
Credits are adapted from the album's liner notes.

No.	Title	Writer(s)	Producer(s)	Length
1.	"Life Is Like a Park" (featuring Carl Thomas)	Tracey Horton, Mark Pitts, Terence Dudley	Terence Dudley	4:00
2.	"Hot!"	T. Horton, Lisa Lopes, Dana Stinson, Raymond Grant, Richard Grant	Rockwilder, DJ Twinz (Raymond Grant & Richard Grant)	4:13
3.	"The Block Party"	L. Lopes, T. Horton, Salaam Remi, Maurice White	Salaam Remi	4:04
4.	"Let Me Live"	L. Lopes, M. Pitts, S. Remi, Inga Willis, Mungal Patasar	Salaam Remi	3:53
5.	"Jenny" (featuring Jazze Pha)	L. Lopes, K. Thomas, M. Pitts, Phalon Alexander, Ricardo Thomas	Rick Rock	6:08
6.	"I Believe in Me"	T. Horton, T. Dudley	Terence Dudley	4:16
7.	"Rags to Riches" (featuring Andre Rison)	L. Lopes, Andre Rison	Bad Moon	4:37
8.	"True Confessions" (featuring Angela Hunte)	L. Lopes, K. Thomas, S. Remi, Angela Hunte	Salaam Remi	3:49
9.	"Untouchable" (with 2Pac)	L. Lopes, T. Horton, Tupac Shakur	2Pac, Left Eye	5:34
10.	"Head to the Sky" (featuring Blaque)	L. Lopes, I. Willis, A. Rison, M. White, Armando Colon, Natina Reed	Armando Colon	4:14
11.	"The Universal Quest" (featuring Esthero)	L. Lopes, Jean-Bea Englishman, Isaac Giles, Kimani Clark	Twin Dragons	5:48
12.	"A New Star Is Born" (featuring Tangi Forman)	L. Lopes, Tangi Forman, Karl Heilbron, Andrew Vowles, Robert Del Naja, Grant Marshall, Tracey Thorn, Ben Watt, James Brown	Karl Heilbron	4:31
13.	"Breathe" (featuring Grant Geissman and Tangi Forman; hidden track)	L. Lopes	Left Eye	4:25
14.	"Friends" (featuring Cassandra Lucas; Japanese bonus track)	L. Lopes	Terence Dudley	4:45

== Release history ==
Region	Date
United Kingdom	August 16, 2001
Japan	September 19, 2001
Australia	November 12, 2001
China	March 12, 2002
