= I Do (Blaque song) =

1999 single by Blaque

Single by Blaque

from the album Blaque
- Released: July 28, 1999
- Genre: Bubblegum pop; R&B
- Length: 3:27
- Label: Columbia
- Songwriter: Natina Reed
- Producers: Michael Anthony; Elgin Manson (album version); Trackmasters (remix version)

Blaque singles chronology
"808" (1999)	"I Do" (1999)	"Bring It All to Me" (1999)

Lisa Lopes singles chronology
"U Know What's Up" (1999)	"I Do" (remix) (1999)	"Never Be the Same Again" (2000)

Music video
- "I Do" on YouTube

"I Do" is a song released in 1999 by the American vocal trio, Blaque. It was released as the group's second single in the United States and Japan, and the third single in Europe.

== Background and composition ==
Musically, it is a mid-tempo pop song with a "funked" up-style production similar to the Spice Girls. It has an "Instant hook, highly accessible melody and youthful vocals". The songs structure have typical R&B/hip hop based verses, while its chorus has a 1960's styled hook "filled with shoo-bop shoo-bop" ad libs reminiscent of The Supremes. The chorus also includes other sounds such as clapping in the background. In addition the song has a tempo of 128 beats per minutes in the key of C major.

== Release ==
Originally, "I Do" was planned to be the second official single for Blaque in the United States since early in their debut album's roll out. However, because of the demand and success on Rhythmic radio that "Bring It All to Me" had in comparison, its promotion was postponed to 2000. In early 2000, the song was reworked and remixed by Trackmasters and sent to U.S. urban radio. The song's remix is a street-edged dance track with a funky bassline. It also features a sample of "I'll Do 4 U" by Father MC. This remix is one of the three remixes the duo produced for the group.

== Music video ==
A music video for "I Do" was directed by Bille Woodruff. The video opens with a cartoon portrait of Blaque displayed on a television screen before cutting to the group performing the verses on a vibrant, colorful set. The members wear sleek white outfits accented with silver, as the visuals ripple and glitch to mimic the effect of flipping through TV channels. During the chorus, the trio appears in striking hot pink ensembles, dancing in a futuristic fuchsia set alongside male background dancers. The scene then transitions to a regal purple backdrop, where the group dons luxurious velvet and fur pieces while standing before massive doors adorned with their animated portraits. In this sequence, the members are shown being watched from a futuristic tablet. For Natina’s verse, she appears in a karate uniform, skillfully wielding nunchucks under the training of Lisa "Left Eye" Lopes, culminating in a playful sparring match between the two during Lopes’s verse. Near the end, Blaque pays homage to The Matrix with a dramatic slow-motion leap enhanced by bullet time effects, closing the video on a bold, cinematic note.

The music video made its debut on BET the week ending August 15, 1999, and a week later on The Box. It was resent to both stations months later on the weeks ending March 5, and March 12, 2000. The video made it its debut on MTV on the week ending April 3, 2000. "I Do" gave Blaque their first and only MTV Video Music Awards nomination in 2000 for Best Editing in a Video. When the late singer Aaliyah hosted TRL in 2000, she mentioned that the video was "adorable" and that she loved the pink outfits they wore.

== Track listings ==
Japanese maxi-CD single

1. "I Do" (Album Version) – 3:28
2. "I Do" Featuring – Lisa "Left Eye" Lopes – 3:50
3. "I Do (Without Rap) – 3:13
4. "I Do" (Instrumental) – 3:47
5. "I Do" (R&B Mix With Rap) – 3:57

European CD single

1. "I Do" (Album Version) – 3:27
2. "I Do" (Track Masters Remix - 2000) – 3:28

Australian enhanced CD single

1. "I Do" (Album Version) – 3:25
2. "I Do" (Track Masters Remix 2000 W/o Rap) – 2:50
3. "I Do" (Track Masters Remix 2000) – 3:29
4. "I Do" (Track Masters/Precision Mix) – 3:23
5. "I Do" Featuring Lisa "Left Eye" Lopes – 3:49
6. "I Do" (R&B Mix With Rap) – 3:58
7. "808" (music video)
8. "I Do" (music video)

== Charts ==
Weekly chart performance for "I Do"
Chart (2000)	Peak position
Australia (ARIA)	94
Netherlands (Dutch Top 40 Tipparade)	16
Netherlands (Single Top 100)	99
US Hot R&B/Hip-Hop Songs (Billboard)	73
US Pop Airplay (Billboard)	39
US Rhythmic Airplay (Billboard)	39

== Release history ==
"I Do" release history
Region	Version	Date	Format(s)	Label(s)	Ref.
Japan	Original	July 28, 1999	Maxi-CD	SME	
United States	Original	August 9, 1999	Rhythmic contemporary radio	Columbia	
United States	Original	August 17, 1999	Urban contemporary radio	Columbia	
United States	Original	September 7, 1999	Contemporary hit radio	Columbia	
United States	Trackmasters Remix	March 21, 2000	Urban contemporary radio	Columbia	
France	Original · Remix	May 9, 2000	Maxi-CD	Columbia	
Germany	Original · Remix	May 9, 2000	Maxi-CD	Columbia	
United Kingdom	Original · Remix	August 29, 2000	Maxi-CD	Columbia	
