= Lisa Lopes =

American rapper (1971–2002)

- Lopes as featured in Black Enterprise magazine c. 2001
- Born: Lisa Nicole Lopes; May 27, 1971; Philadelphia, Pennsylvania, U.S.
- Died: April 25, 2002 (aged 30); La Ceiba, Honduras
- Resting place: Hillandale Memorial Gardens, Lithonia, Georgia, U.S.
- Other names: Left Eye; N.I.N.A.
- Occupations: Rapper; singer-songwriter
- Years active: 1990–2002
- Partners: Andre Rison (1993–2001); Sean Newman (2000)
- Musical career
- Origin: Atlanta, Georgia, U.S.
- Genres: Hip-hop; R&B; pop
- Instrument: Vocals
- Labels: LaFace; Arista; Death Row
- Formerly of: TLC
- Website: lisalopesfoundation.net

Lisa Nicole Lopes (May 27, 1971 – April 25, 2002), also known by her stage name Left Eye, was an American rapper and singer-songwriter. She was a member of the R&B girl group TLC, alongside Tionne "T-Boz" Watkins and Rozonda "Chilli" Thomas. Besides rapping on TLC recordings, Lopes was the creative force behind the group, receiving more co-writing credits than the other members. She also designed some of their outfits and the stage for their FanMail Tour and contributed to the group's image, album titles, artworks, and music videos. Through her work with TLC, Lopes won four Grammy Awards.

During her brief solo career, Lopes scored two US top 10 singles with "Not Tonight" and "U Know What's Up", as well as one UK number-one single with "Never Be the Same Again", the latter a collaboration with Melanie C of the English girl group Spice Girls. She also produced another girl group, Blaque, who scored a platinum album and two US top 10 hits. Lopes remains the only member of TLC to have released a solo album.

In 2002, Lopes was killed in a car crash in Honduras while volunteering at a children's development center. Lopes lost control of her rental SUV when she swerved to avoid a truck. She was the only one not wearing a seatbelt; four other passengers were injured enough to require hospitalization. The documentary The Last Days of Left Eye was released and aired on VH1 in May 2007.

== Early life ==
Lisa Nicole Lopes was born on May 27, 1971, in Philadelphia, Pennsylvania, the daughter of Wanda (née Andino), a seamstress, and Ronald Lopes Sr., a US Army staff sergeant. She was raised in Logan, Philadelphia. Lisa has a younger brother, Ronald Jr., and a younger sister, Raina (nicknamed Reigndrop). In a 2002 interview with Sister 2 Sister, Ronald Jr. said that he and his siblings were Black, with some Portuguese ancestry on their father's side from the West African country of Cabo Verde and part Mexican ancestry on their mother's. Lopes said her father was "very strict, very domineering" and that he treated the family like they were in "boot camp". He was also a "talented musician" who played the harmonica, clarinet, piano, and saxophone.

Lopes' parents separated when she was still in school, and her paternal grandmother raised her during the later years of her childhood. She began playing with a toy piano at five years old, and later composed her own songs. By age 10, Lopes formed the musical trio The Lopes Kids with her siblings, with whom she performed gospel songs at local events and churches. She attended the Philadelphia High School for Girls. In an interview with The Independent, Lopes said that at 14 she was moved after hearing the Queen Latifah and Monie Love song "Ladies First".

== Career ==
=== 1990–1999: TLC ===
In late 1990, Lopes moved to Atlanta to dance in an artist's music video. TLC originally started as a female trio called '2nd Nature', with T-Boz, Left Eye and Crystal. The group was renamed TLC, derived from the first initials of its members at the time: Tionne Watkins, Lisa Lopes and Crystal Jones. Things did not work out with Jones, and TLC's manager Perri "Pebbles" Reid brought in Damian Dame backup dancer Rozonda Thomas as a third member of the group. To preserve the band's original name, Thomas needed a name starting with C, which is how she became "Chilli", a name chosen by Lopes. Watkins became T-Boz, derived from the first letter of her first name and "Boz" (slang for "boss"). Lopes was renamed "Left Eye" after a compliment from her friend, New Edition member Michael Bivins, who once told her he was attracted to her because of her left eye, which was more slanted than her right eye. Lopes emphasized her nickname by wearing a pair of glasses with the right lens covered by a condom in keeping with the group's support of safe sex, wearing a black stripe under her left eye, and eventually getting her left eyebrow pierced.

The group debuted in 1992 with the album Ooooooohhh... On the TLC Tip. With four hit singles, it sold six million copies worldwide, leading to the group becoming a household name. Shortly afterwards, Lopes began dating Atlanta Falcons football player Andre Rison, and the two soon moved in together in Rison's upscale double-story home. Their relationship was allegedly filled with violent moments, and Lopes filed an assault charge against Rison on September 2, 1993. Lopes had a battle with alcohol at the time, having started drinking at the age of fifteen. After another fight between the couple, in the early morning hours of June 9, 1994, Lopes tossed numerous pairs of Rison's newly purchased sneakers into a bathtub and lit them on fire. The fiberglass bathtub quickly melted and set the structural frame of the house on fire. Lopes and Rison had had a fight previously because she caught Rison in bed with another woman. Lopes had thrown numerous teddy bears Rison had bought her into the tub and lit them on fire. Rison then had the damaged marble tub replaced with a cheaper fiberglass model, which went up in flames immediately when she set the shoes on fire. Lopes was arrested and indicted on charges of first-degree arson; she was sentenced to five years of probation and a $10,000 fine. Rison eventually reconciled with Lopes, and they continued dating on and off for seven years.

Shortly after, CrazySexyCool was released, selling over 23 million copies worldwide. However, Lopes' stint in rehab had led to her only having limited input in the writing and recording of the album. After the release of CrazySexyCool, Lopes was a featured artist for the first time on "How Do You Like It?" a song by Keith Sweat in 1994. Later in 1995, Lopes recorded a well-received verse to the rap version of "Freedom" of the soundtrack from the Black Panther-based docudrama Panther with fellow female hip-hop artists such as Queen Latifah, MC Lyte, Patra, Yo-Yo, Salt 'n' Pepa and Meshell Ndegeocello. In 1997, Lopes was featured on the remix to Lil' Kim's "Not Tonight", alongside Missy Elliott, Angie Martinez and Da Brat. The single earned all artists a nomination for Best Rap Performance by a Duo or Group at the 1998 Grammy Awards. TLC's third album, FanMail, was released in 1999 and sold over 14 million copies worldwide. The album's title was named by Lopes as a tribute to TLC's loyal fans and the sleeve contained the names of hundreds of fans screen names as a "thank you".

During and after the release of FanMail, Lopes made it known to the press on multiple occasions that she felt that she was unable to express herself in TLC fully. Her contributions to songs had been reduced to periodic eight-bar raps, and there were several songs in which she had no vocals. Studio session singers such as Debra Killings often sang background vocals for the group's songs. In the May 1999 issue of Vibe magazine, Lopes said, "I've graduated from this era. I cannot stand 100 percent behind this TLC project and the music that is supposed to represent me." In response to Lopes' comments, Watkins and Thomas stated to Entertainment Weekly that Lopes "doesn't respect the whole group" and "Left Eye is only concerned with Left Eye." In response, Lopes sent a reply through Entertainment Weekly issuing a "challenge" to Watkins and Thomas to release solo albums and let the fans decide the winner of TLC. Not only would it be entertaining, but more importantly, the three albums would fulfill their contractual obligations and end their deal with LaFace Records:

I challenge Tionne Watkins (T-Boz) and Rozonda Thomas (Chilli) to an album entitled "The Challenge"... a 3-CD set that contains three solo albums. Each [album]... will be due to the record label by October 1, 2000... I also challenge Dallas 'The Manipulator' Austin to produce all of the material and do it at a fraction of his normal rate. As I think about it, I'm sure LaFace would not mind throwing in a $1.5 million prize for the winner.

Watkins and Thomas were unconvinced by the strategy behind 'The Challenge' and declined to take up the offer, though Lopes remained firm in her support for the idea. Things were heated between the band for some time, with Thomas speaking out against Lopes, calling her antics "selfish", "evil", and "heartless". TLC then addressed these struggles by saying that they are very much like sisters who have their disagreements every now and then as Lopes explained, "It's deeper than a working relationship. We have feelings for each other, which is why we get so mad at each other. I usually say that you cannot hate someone unless you love them. So, we love each other. That's the problem."

=== 1998–2002: Solo career ===
In 1998, Lopes hosted the short-lived MTV series The Cut, in which a list of aspiring pop stars, rappers, and rock bands competed against each other in front of judges. The show's winner, which ended up being a male-female rap duo named Silky, was promised a record deal and funding to produce a music video, which would then enter MTV's heavy rotation. A then-unknown Anastacia finished in third place, but ended up securing a record deal after Lopes and the show's three judges were impressed by her performance.

Lopes created Left Eye Productions to discover new talent. She mentored the R&B trio Blaque, and helped them secure a record deal with Columbia Records. Their self-titled debut album was executive-produced by Lopes, who also made a cameo appearance in their music video "808" and also rapped in their second music video "I Do". Lopes was also developing and promoting another new band called Egypt. They worked with Lopes on her second album under her new nickname, N.I.N.A., meaning New Identity Not Applicable. She was also featured on Method Man's second album Tical 2000: Judgement Day on the song "Cradle Rock".

In 2000, Lopes became a featured rapper on several singles, including Spice Girls Melanie C's "Never Be the Same Again", which topped the charts in 35 countries, including the United Kingdom. She was also featured on "U Know What's Up", the first single from Donell Jones' second album, Where I Wanna Be, and she rapped a verse in "Space Cowboy" with NSYNC on their 2000 album, No Strings Attached. On October 4, 2000, Lopes co-hosted the UK's MOBO Awards with Trevor Nelson, where she also performed "U Know What's Up" with Jones. She also collaborated on "Gimme Some" by Toni Braxton for her 2000 album The Heat. She had previously featured on Keith Sweat's song "How Do You Like It?". In 2001, she appeared in a commercial for the fashion brand Gap. In July 2001, Lopes appeared on the singers' edition of Who Wants to Be a Millionaire along with Joey McIntyre, Tyrese, Nick Lachey, and Lee Ann Womack. She dropped the $125,000 question and won $32,000 for her charity. After her death in 2002, the episode she appeared in was shown in dedication to her.

In 2008, Lopes' family opened UNI Studios, which she had created for the purpose of recording solo projects, to the public. Her brother Ronald is the general manager of the studio. Lopes had a dream of making new artists able to record music at a low cost, in a high-end studio at her house. Her family continues to operate it and fill it with new equipment.

==== Supernova ====
Lopes spent much of her free time after the conclusion of TLC's first headlining tour, the FanMail Tour, recording her debut solo album, Supernova. It includes a song titled "A New Star is Born", which is dedicated to her late father. She told MTV News:

That track is dedicated to all those that have loved ones that have passed away. It's saying that there is no such thing as death. We can call it transforming for a lack of better words, but as scientists would say, 'Every atom that was once a star is now in you.' It's in your body. So, in the song I pretty much go along with that idea. ... I don't care what happens or what people think about death, it doesn't matter. We all share the same space.

Other tracks covered other personal issues, including her tumultuous relationship with Rison. Among the album's 13 tracks was also a posthumous duet with Tupac Shakur that was assembled from the large cache of unreleased recordings done prior to his murder in 1996. Initially scheduled for release on a date to coincide with the 11th anniversary of her grandfather's death, Arista Records decided to delay and then cancel the American release. The album was eventually released in August 2001 in different foreign countries. The Japanese import includes a bonus track called "Friends", which would later be sampled for "Give It to Me While It's Hot" on TLC's fourth album 3D.

==== N.I.N.A. ====
After numerous talks with Death Row Records CEO Suge Knight, Lopes severed her solo deal with Arista (despite remaining signed to the label as a member of TLC) and signed with Knight's Death Row Records in January 2002, intending to record a second solo album under the pseudonym "N.I.N.A." (New Identity Not Applicable). She had discussions about recording with David Bowie for the project, whom she was also trying to get involved with the fourth TLC album. The project was also planned to include collaborations with Ray J along with close friend Missy Elliott. After Lopes' death in April 2002, Death Row Records still had plans to complete and release the album (unfinished at the time of Lopes' death) in October 2002, but the album was cancelled for unknown reasons. Several tracks from the album were leaked online featuring artists from Tha Row Records. Lopes's unreleased songs were also sampled by TLC for their fourth album 3D after she died. Another track, "Too Street 4 T.V" (featuring Danny Boy), was released on the soundtrack to the 2003 film Dysfunktional Family.

=== 2008–2012: Eye Legacy ===
In 2008, Lopes' family decided to work with producers at Surefire Music Group to create a posthumous album in her honor, Eye Legacy. Originally set to be released October 28, 2008, the release date was pushed back to November 11, then to January 27, 2009. The song 'Neva Will Eye Eva' and "Crank It", both feature and were co-produced by Lopes' sister Raina "Reigndrop" Lopes. The first official single from the album, "Let's Just Do It", was released on January 13, 2009, and features Missy Elliott and TLC. The second official single, "Block Party", features Lil Mama. The album largely consists of reworked versions of tracks from the Supernova album. In November 2009, Forever... The EP was released which contained international bonus tracks not used on the Eye Legacy album. The EP was only available to download.

In 2012, on the eve of the tenth anniversary of her death, "Fantasies", an unreleased track by Bootleg featuring Lopes, was uploaded to SoundCloud.

== Personal life ==
Lopes was often vocal about her personal life and difficult past. She came from an abusive, alcoholic background and struggled with alcoholism herself. These issues became headline news in June 1994, when she was arrested for setting fire to Andre Rison's sneakers in a bathtub; the fire ultimately spread to the mansion they shared and destroyed it. She claimed that Rison had beaten her after a night out, and she set fire to his shoes to get back at him, but burning down the house was an accident. Lopes later revealed that she did not have a lot of freedom within the relationship and that Rison abused her emotionally and physically; she said that she released her frustrations about the relationship on the night of the fire.

Lopes was sentenced to five years' probation and therapy at a halfway house, and was unable to shake the incident from her reputation. Lopes revealed in The Last Days of Left Eye that her meeting with a struggling mother in rehab left a big impression on her. She subsequently helped raise the woman's eight-year-old as her goddaughter.

Lopes had several tattoos. Most prominent was a large eagle on her left arm, which she said represented freedom. Later, she added the number "80" around the eagle, which was Rison's NFL number while in Atlanta. She also had a tattoo of a moon with a face on her foot in reference to Rison's nickname, "Bad Moon". On her upper right arm was a large tattoo of the name "Parron" for her late stepbrother who died in a boating accident, arching over a large tattoo of a pierced heart. Her smallest tattoo was on her left earlobe and consisted of an arrow pointing to her left over the symbol of an eye, a reference to her nickname. Lopes struggled with self-harm and even carved the words "hate" and "love" into her arm with a razor.

In September 2000, Lopes was reported missing after failing to attend a family gathering and a major press conference in Las Vegas.

Roughly two weeks before her own death, Lopes was a passenger in a traffic accident that resulted in the death of a 10-year-old Honduran boy. As reported in Philadelphia Weekly, "It is commonplace for people to walk the roads that wind through Honduras, and it's often difficult to see pedestrians." The boy, Bayron Isaul Fuentes Lopez, was following behind his brothers and sisters when he stepped off the median strip and was struck by a van driven by Stephanie, Lopes' personal assistant. Lopes' party stopped and loaded the boy into the car, and Lopes "cradled the dying boy's bleeding head in her arms" while "someone gave him mouth-to-mouth resuscitation as they rushed him to a nearby hospital." He died the next day. Lopes paid approximately $3,700 for his medical expenses and funeral, and she gave the family around $925 for any extra costs, although it was apparently agreed upon by the authorities and the boy's family that his death was an "unforeseeable tragedy" and no blame was placed on the driver of the van or Lopes. In the documentary The Last Days of Left Eye, Lopes is shown choosing a casket for the child from a local funeral home. Earlier in the documentary, Lopes mentioned that she felt the presence of a "spirit" following her, and was struck by the fact that the child killed in the accident shared a similar last name, even thinking that the spirit may have made a mistake by taking his life instead of hers.

== Death and funeral ==
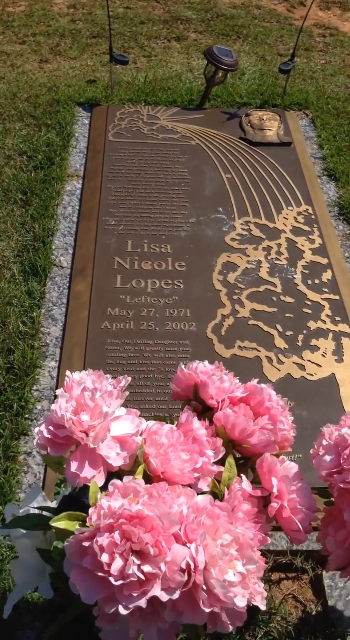
Lopes's grave at Hillandale Memorial Gardens

On April 25, 2002, Lopes was driving a rented Mitsubishi Montero SUV in La Ceiba, Honduras, when she swerved to avoid a truck standing on the side of the road, then turned sharply to the left as she tried to avoid an oncoming car. The vehicle rolled three times after hitting two trees, throwing Lopes and three others out of the windows, and finally coming to rest in a ditch at the side of the road. She died instantly due to a severe traumatic brain injury, and was the only person killed in the crash. She was not wearing a seat belt. The collision was recorded on video from inside the vehicle because a documentary film was in progress.

On May 2, 2002, Lopes' funeral was held at New Birth Missionary Baptist Church in Stonecrest, Georgia. Thousands of people attended. Engraved upon her casket were the lyrics to her portion of "Waterfalls", stating "Dreams are hopeless aspirations, in hopes of coming true, believe in yourself, the rest is up to me and you." Gospel duo Mary Mary sang their song "Shackles (Praise You)" at the funeral. Lopes was buried at Hillandale Memorial Gardens in Lithonia.

== Legacy ==
In a statement to MTV, music producer Jermaine Dupri remembered Lopes: "She was determined to be something in life. She was a true rock star. She didn't care about no press. She was the rock star out of the group. She was the one that would curse on TV. She had the tattoos. You could expect the unexpected. When you see Lisa, you could expect something from her. That's the gift she carried."

Lopes was in the process of setting up two educational centers for Honduran children. One was built on an 80-acre plot of land she called Camp YAC. The other center was called Creative Castle.

In 2003, shortly after Lopes' death, her family started the Lisa Lopes Foundation, a charitable group dedicated to providing neglected and abandoned youth with the resources necessary to increase their quality of life. Her spiritual motto was the one used for her foundation: "Energy never dies... it just transforms." Her foundation went into various underdeveloped villages and gave new clothes to poor children and their families. In August 2007, the foundation hosted a charity auction, selling items donated by celebrities. It raised approximately $5,000 for the Hogar de Amor ("Home of Love"), an orphanage in Honduras. In 2012, the foundation began hosting an annual music festival, known as "Left Eye Music Fest", in Decatur, Georgia.

In January 2020, Lifetime aired an episode of Hopelessly In Love, a docuseries that captures the relationships of the rich and famous, about Lopes and Rison's tumultuous relationship. It showcased the complexity of their relationship and how she ended up with a felony arson charge for burning down Rison's Atlanta mansion.

=== Posthumous documentary ===
A documentary showing the final 27 days of Lopes' life, titled The Last Days of Left Eye, premiered at the Atlanta Film Festival in April 2007, for an audience that included many of Lopes' contemporaries, including Monica, Ronnie DeVoe, 112, Big Boi, India.Arie, and Cee Lo Green. VH1 and VH1 Soul broadcast the documentary on May 19, 2007. Most of the footage was shot with a handheld camera, often in the form of diary entries filmed by Lopes while on a 30-day spiritual retreat in Honduras with sister Reigndrop, brother Ronald and members of the R&B group Egypt. In these entries, she reflected on her personal life and career. A calmer side of her personality was on display, showing interests in numerology and yoga.

== Discography ==
=== Studio albums ===
- Supernova (2001)
- Eye Legacy (2009)

== Filmography ==
Year	Title	Role
1994	House Party 3	Sex as a Weapon (with TLC)
1995	Living Single	Herself (with TLC)
1998	The Cut	Herself (presenter)
1999	Cousin Skeeter	Brenda, Season 2 Episode "Jezebel"
2000	Bamboozled	Herself
2007	The Last Days of Left Eye	Herself (archive footage)
2013	CrazySexyCool: The TLC Story	Herself (archive footage) (VH1 biopic)
2020	Hopelessly in Love: Lisa "Left Eye" Lopes and Andre Rison	Herself (archive footage) (Lifetime documentary)
2023	TLC Forever	Herself (archive footage) (Lifetime documentary)

== See also ==
- List of Afro-Latinos
