= Shamari DeVoe =

American singer

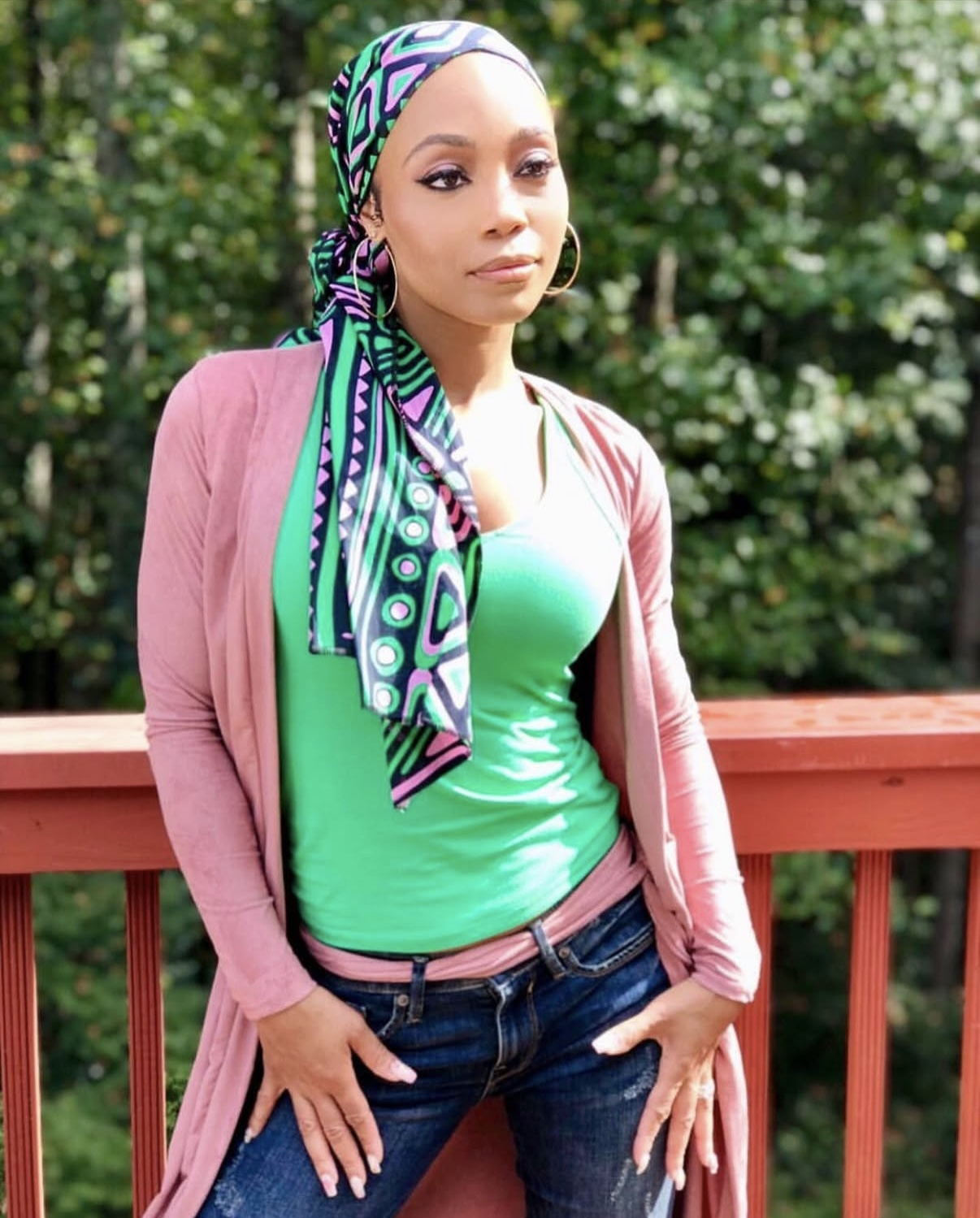
- DeVoe in 2020

Background information
- Born: Shamari Fears; Detroit, Michigan, U.S.
- Origin: Atlanta, Georgia, U.S.
- Occupations: Singer; dancer
- Years active: 1997–present
- Labels: Columbia; Elektra; Darkchild
- Member of: Blaque
- Formerly of: BluPrint
- Spouse: Ronnie DeVoe (m. 2006)

Shamari DeVoe (née Fears) is an American singer. DeVoe gained notice in the late 1990s as the lead singer of the girl group Blaque. DeVoe portrayed Lava in the comedy film Bring It On (2000). She has also appeared on the Bravo reality television series The Real Housewives of Atlanta for its eleventh season; and the VH1 series Couples Retreat (2022–2023) alongside her husband R&B singer Ronnie DeVoe.

== Early life ==
DeVoe was born in Detroit to Dawn Anderson and Raymond Fears. Raised in Atlanta, her interest in music and performing continued after participating in talent show at age of 13. The following year, she formed her first girl group with a rotation of members, including classmate Natina Reed. In 2013, DeVoe graduated from Georgia State University with a bachelor of arts degree in Sociology.

== Career ==
DeVoe was discovered by American rapper Lisa Lopes, who mentored Blaque. She formed Blaque with Brandi Williams and Reed. The group made their first appearance in 1997, in the music video for Lil' Kim's "Not Tonight". Their debut album Blaque (1999) sold more than 1.5 million copies and was certified Platinum. Billboard named Blaque as the fourth "Best New Artist" in 1999.

In 2000, DeVoe portrayed a cheerleader named Lava in the comedy film Bring It On.

Blaque went on hiatus until 2007 and eventually split in 2008. Natina Reed died after being hit by a car in 2012. DeVoe still performs with fellow group member Brandi Williams.

In November 2018, DeVoe joined the cast of the Bravo reality television series The Real Housewives of Atlanta for the show's eleventh season. On September 26, 2019, it was announced that DeVoe would not be returning for the twelfth season. She is working on a collaboration with her husband Ronnie DeVoe called Me & Mari. The duo released a single called "Love Comes Through" on December 7, 2018.

== Personal life ==
On March 10, 2006, she married Ronnie DeVoe of New Edition. The couple have twin boys born in 2017. DeVoe became a member of Alpha Kappa Alpha sorority in December 2014.

== Discography ==
=== Album appearances ===
| Year | Title | Album |
|---|---|---|
| 2001 | Da Hot S*** (Aight) with Bell Biv DeVoe | BBD |

== Filmography ==
=== Film ===
| Year | Title | Role | Notes |
|---|---|---|---|
| 2000 | Bring It On | Lava | |
| 2003 | Honey | Herself | |

=== Television ===
| Year | Title | Role | Notes |
|---|---|---|---|
| 2001 | V.I.P. | Herself | Episode: "Kayus Ex Machina" |
| 2018–2019; 2025 | The Real Housewives of Atlanta | Herself | Main cast member (Season 11); Guest (Season 16) |
| 2019 | Watch What Happens: Live | Herself | Episode(s): Kandi Burruss & Shamari DeVoe / Shamari DeVoe & Bevy Smith |
| 2020 | Say Yes to the Dress: Atlanta | Herself | Episode: Y'all Are Trying To Please 11 Women |
| 2021 | Genius | Backup Singer #2 | Episode: "Young, Gifted and Black" |
| 2021 | BET Presents: The Encore | Herself | Main cast member (Season 1) |
| 2022–23 | VH1: Couples Retreat | Herself | Main cast member (Seasons 2–3) |

=== Music video appearances ===
| Year | Title | Artist |
|---|---|---|
| 1997 | "Not Tonight" | Lil' Kim |
| 2001 | "Welcome To Atlanta" | Ludacris |
