= Honey (2003 film) =

2003 film by Bille Woodruff

- Theatrical release poster
- Directed by: Bille Woodruff
- Written by: Alonzo Brown; Kim Watson
- Produced by: Marc Platt; Andre Harrell
- Starring: Jessica Alba; Mekhi Phifer; Joy Bryant; Lil' Romeo
- Cinematography: John R. Leonetti
- Edited by: Mark Helfrich; Emma E. Hickox
- Music by: Mervyn Warren
- Production companies: NuAmerica Entertainment; Marc Platt Productions
- Distributed by: Universal Pictures
- Release date: December 5, 2003
- Running time: 94 minutes
- Country: United States
- Language: English
- Budget: $18 million
- Box office: $65.3 million

Honey is a 2003 American dance film directed by Bille Woodruff (in his feature film directorial debut). It stars Jessica Alba, Mekhi Phifer, Romeo Miller, Joy Bryant, and David Moscow, with a cameo by Missy Elliott and featured performances by Tweet, Sheek Louch, Jadakiss, Ginuwine, and Blaque. It also marked Blaque member Natina Reed's final feature film. The film received negative reviews, but was a box-office success.

== Plot ==
Honey Daniels works as a bartender, a record store clerk and a dance teacher at a NYC community center run by her mother. She wants to become a hip hop choreographer, though her mother presses her to teach ballet uptown.

Honey and her rival Katrina are recorded having a dance-off. She and her friend Gina find brothers Benny and Raymond street dancing and invite them to her classes. The dance-off video reaches video director Michael Ellis, who hires Honey as a backup dancer and later as a choreographer. Her career brings money and fame but takes her away from the center and neighborhood kids.

After Benny gets into a fight, Honey hires him as her assistant to keep him out of trouble. She convinces Michael to hire her students as dancers in Ginuwine's new video. Honey begins dating Raymond's barber Chaz, who inspires her to prioritize her happiness over fame. She puts down a deposit on an old store she can turn into a dance studio. Michael insists Honey go with him to an "important meeting," causing her to cancel the birthday trip with Gina. The meeting turns out to be a networking party, where Michael drunkenly hits on her. She slaps him and leaves. The next day, Gina is furious to see a photo of Honey at the party. At the Ginuwine shoot, Michael fires Honey and the kids for her spurning him, replacing her with Katrina.

Honey is forced to break the bad news to the kids, who are heartbroken over losing their chance to be in a music video. Benny returns to drug dealing, only to get arrested and land in juvie. Honey then visits him shortly before his release and mentions that she wants to help him once he is out, but he starts to insult her. She attempts to express disappointment about his choices, but Benny continues belittling her and tells her to leave him alone. As she prepares to leave, Honey manages to ask Benny how often his gangster friends have visited, causing him to become visibly saddened and silent. She then departs and he instantly regrets his rudeness towards her, realizing that she was the only one that cared enough to visit him due his gang "friends" not truly caring about him and his own mother and brother's refusal to visit because of their disappointment in him. He also realizes that he has mainly disappointed himself by making bad decisions that could get him imprisoned for life or killed.

Gina eventually forgives Honey and encourages her to trust in herself. As Honey's income dries up due to Michael's influence in the industry, she is unable to pay the remainder of the store's down payment, which will soon go back on the market. Honey decides to hold a dance benefit and newly released Benny brings his dance friends to help, teaching them some moves he learned while in juvie.

Michael pushes Katrina as choreographer for a Missy Elliott video, but Missy prefers Honey. Having realized his huge mistake, Michael profusely apologizes to Honey and begs her come back, offering to buy her the studio. Realizing that he is in major trouble with his artists, Honey calls him out on his hypocrisy and selfishness. She rejects his offer and makes him realize that he both messed up her career and betrayed and hurt the kids out of his own pettiness. She then tells Michael that she will get the studio on her own merits and leaves him feeling regretful over his actions.

Gina's bank manager asks arts donors to attend the benefit, which is a full house, and everyone is enthusiastic about the performances. Honey's mother sees that the dance form her daughter loves can give her everything that ballet could. The bank manager assures Honey the building is fully funded.

Missy arrives as the benefit finishes, rushing in to meet Honey. She introduces Honey to Blaque at her new dance studio, The Bronx Dance Center, to prepare their new video.

== Cast ==
- Jessica Alba as Honey Daniels, a hip-hop choreographer
- Mekhi Phifer as Chaz, a barber, Honey's boyfriend
- Romeo Miller (credited as Lil' Romeo) as Benny
- Joy Bryant as Gina, Honey's best friend
- David Moscow as Michael Ellis, a music producer
- Lonette McKee as Mrs. Connie Daniels, Honey's mom
- Zachary Isaiah Williams as Raymond, Benny's brother
- Laurie Ann Gibson as Katrina, Honey's rival

A number of popular hip hop and R&B musicians, groups and producers play themselves in prominent cameos, including Missy Elliott, Jadakiss, Sheek Louch, Natina Reed, Shawn Desman, Ginuwine, Rodney Jerkins, 3rd Storee, Tweet, and Blaque.

== Production ==
The film is inspired by the life of choreographer Laurieann Gibson, who was the film's choreographer and appeared on screen as Katrina, the main character's rival.

Singer/actress Aaliyah was reportedly originally cast as Honey, though the role was later recast to Jessica Alba due to Aaliyah's death in August 2001. In 2020, director Bille Woodruff debunked the rumor, stating: "That’s incorrect. It was supposed to be Beyoncé. That’s been widely reported, but it’s incorrect. [Beyoncé] couldn’t do it because of her touring schedule for her first album Dangerously in Love."

However, in a 2025 interview, co-writer Kim Watson confirmed that he and fellow co-writer Alonzo Brown did indeed write Honey as a star vehicle for Aaliyah at Universal Studios after all. And, then went on to say that Aaliyah was supposed to start dance rehearsals for the film soon after her Rock The Boat music video shoot. Unfortunately, due to Aaliyah’s untimely death in 2001 after the shooting of “Rock The Boat,” the role of Honey ended up being recast. It is still unclear if director Bille Woodruff was involved with production before or after Aaliyah’s death, which might explain this long-running confusion.

== Reception ==
=== Critical response ===
Honey was released to mostly negative reviews. Rotten Tomatoes gives the film a score of 19% based on reviews from 112 critics. The critical consensus reads, "An attractive Jessica Alba and energetic dance numbers provide some lift to this corny and formulaic movie". Metacritic, based on 30 reviews, gives the film a score of 37 out of 100, signifying generally unfavorable reviews.

A. O. Scott of The New York Times was one of the critics to give the film a positive review, noting that it "brings out the wholesome, affirmative side of the hip-hop aesthetic without being overly preachy, although it will not impress anyone with its originality."

=== Box office ===
The film opened at #2 at the U.S. box office, earning US$12.9 million in its opening weekend, behind The Last Samurai. The final box office was $30.3 million in the U.S. and Canada and $31.9 million in other countries, for a total of $62.2 million worldwide.

== Music ==
A soundtrack containing hip hop, R&B, funk and disco music was released on November 11, 2003, by Elektra Records. It peaked at #105 on the Billboard 200 and #47 on the Top R&B/Hip-Hop Albums charts.

== Sequels ==
Bille Woodruff, the director of Honey, also directed 3 sequels, the theatrically released Honey 2 (2011) and 2 straight-to-video sequels Honey 3: Dare to Dance (2016) and Honey: Rise Up and Dance (2018), each with different casts.
