= Not Tonight (song) =

1997 single by Lil' Kim

"Not Tonight" (Ladies Night remix)

Single by Lil' Kim featuring Da Brat, Lisa Lopes, Missy Elliott and Angie Martinez

from the album Hard Core and Nothing to Lose (soundtrack)
- B-side: "Drugs", "Crush on You"
- Released: June 24, 1997
- Studio: Master Sound (Virginia Beach, Virginia)
- Genre: Hip hop; R&B
- Length: 4:31
- Label: Atlantic; Tommy Boy
- Songwriters: Kimberly Jones; Lisa Lopes; Shawntae Harris; Angela Martinez; Melissa Elliott; Ronald Bell; Claydes Smith; Robert Bell; James Warren Taylor; Meekaaeel Muhammad; George Brown; Dennis Thomas; Earl Toon, Jr.
- Producers: Armando Colon; Rashad "Ringo" Smith

Lil' Kim singles chronology
"I Can Love You" (1997)	"Not Tonight" (Ladies Night remix) (1997)	"Call Me" (1997)

Lisa Lopes singles chronology
"No Tighter Wish" (1996)	"Not Tonight" (Ladies Night remix) (1997)	"Big Willie Style" (1997)

Da Brat singles chronology
"Ghetto Love" (1997)	"Not Tonight" (Ladies Night remix) (1997)	"Sock It 2 Me" (1997)

Missy Elliott singles chronology
"The Rain (Supa Dupa Fly)" (1997)	"Not Tonight" (Ladies Night remix) (1997)	"What About Us" (1997)

Angie Martinez singles chronology
"Not Tonight" (Ladies Night remix) (1997)	"Mi Amor" (2000)

Music video
- "Not Tonight" (Ladies Night remix) on YouTube

"Not Tonight" is a song performed by the American rapper Lil' Kim featuring Jermaine Dupri for her debut studio album Hard Core (1996). A remix was released the following year featuring female rappers Da Brat, Missy "Misdeameanor" Elliott, Angie Martinez, and the late rapper Lisa "Left Eye" Lopes for the Nothing to Lose soundtrack. It was released on June 24, 1997, by Atlantic Records.

The remix became a hit in the U.S., peaking at number six on the Billboard Hot 100 and number two on the Rap Songs chart, and was nominated for Best Rap Performance by a Duo or Group at the 40th Annual Grammy Awards. Internationally, "Not Tonight" peaked at number four in New Zealand and entered the top 20 on the UK Singles Chart, reaching number 11.

== Background ==
The original version of "Not Tonight" was featured on Lil' Kim's first album Hard Core. It was produced by Jermaine Dupri, who was also featured on the song. This version samples "Turn Your Love Around" by George Benson. The song is about Lil' Kim feeling blasé about traditional vaginal intercourse and preferring a man perform cunnilingus on her, presumably at least for that evening.

The remix, known as "Not Tonight (Ladies Night Remix)", was released as a single and was performed by Lil' Kim, Da Brat, Missy Elliott, Angie Martinez and Lisa "Left Eye" Lopes". It was featured on the Nothing to Lose soundtrack. This version samples "Ladies' Night" by Kool & the Gang. The remix became a top 40 hit in the US, the UK, Canada, New Zealand and the Netherlands. It was produced by Rashad "Ringo" Smith.

== Music video ==
The video (which uses the remix version) was shot in West Palm Beach, Florida, from June 27 to 28, 1997. The video starts showing the girls on a boat and eventually in a jungle setting. The music video shows clips from the movie Nothing to Lose. It also features guest appearances from other female celebrities including Mary J. Blige, T-Boz, Queen Latifah, SWV, Xscape, Blaque, Changing Faces, Total, Leslie Segar and Maia Campbell.

== Formats and track listings ==
- U.S. CD/cassette single
1. "Not Tonight" (Remix)
2. "Not Tonight" (Instrumental)
- U.S. maxi-single
1. "Not Tonight" (Remix)
2. "Crush On You" (Remix)
3. "Drugs"
4. "Not Tonight"
5. "Crush On You"
6. "Not Tonight" (Remix instrumental)
7. "Drugs" (Instrumental)
8. "Not Tonight" (Original instrumental)
- U.S. 12" vinyl
1. "Not Tonight" (Remix)
2. "Not Tonight" (Instrumental remix)
3. "Drugs"
4. "Crush on You" (Remix)
5. "Crush on You" (Remix instrumental)
6. "Drugs" (Instrumental)
- Europe CD single
1. "Not Tonight" (Remix)
2. "Not Tonight" (Remix Instrumental)
3. "Drugs" (Album Version)
4. "Drugs" (Instrumental)
- UK cassette single
1. "Not Tonight" (Remix)
2. "Drugs" (Album Version)

== Credits and personnel ==
Credits from "Not Tonight" are taken from the single's liner notes.

Recording

- Recorded at Sound-On-Sound, The Hit Factory & Capitol Recording Studio
- Recorded by Ed Raso, Andy Cardenas & Bill Smith

Personnel

- Vocals – Lil' Kim, Da Brat, Missy Elliott, Angie Martinez, and Lisa "Left Eye" Lopes
- Songwriting – K. Jones, M. Elliott, L. Lopes, S. Harris, A. Martinez, R. Bell, G. Brown, M. Muhammed, C. Smith, J. Taylor, D. Thomas, E. Toon
- Producer – Armando Colon, Rashad Smith
- Mixing – Rick Travali and L. Lopes

== Charts ==
=== Weekly charts ===
Charts (1997)	Peak position
Canada (Nielsen SoundScan)	10
Canada Dance/Urban (RPM)	4
Europe (European Hot 100 Singles)	76
Germany (GfK)	99
Netherlands (Dutch Top 40)	30
Netherlands (Single Top 100)	31
New Zealand (Recorded Music NZ)	4
Scottish Singles Sales (Official Charts)	36
Sweden (Sverigetopplistan)	52
UK Singles (Official Charts)	11
UK Dance (Official Charts)	2
UK Hip Hop/R&B (Official Charts)	5
US Billboard Hot 100	6
US Dance Singles Sales (Billboard); With "Crush on you"	2
US Hot R&B/Hip-Hop Songs (Billboard)	3
US Hot Rap Songs (Billboard)	2
US Rhythmic Airplay (Billboard)	15

=== Year-end charts ===
Chart (1997)	Position
New Zealand (Recorded Music NZ)	27
UK Urban (Music Week)	25
US Billboard Hot 100	46
US Billboard Hot R&B Singles Sales	21
US Billboard Hot R&B Airplay	31
US Billboard Hot Rap Singles	8
US Billboard Hot Dance Maxi-Singles Sales	11

== Certifications ==
Region	Certification	Certified units/sales
United States (RIAA)	Platinum	900,000
