= Blaque (album) =

Studio album by Blaque
- Released: May 19, 1999
- Recorded: 1997–1999
- Genres: R&B; pop
- Length: 53:00
- Labels: Trackmasters; Columbia
- Producers: Michael Anthony; Bob Baldwin; Sideeq "The Beat" Freak; Marcus Goins; Curt Gowdy; R. Kelly; L.E.S.; Elgin Manson; Natina Reed; Poke & Tone; Timothy "Tyme" Riley; Cory Rooney; She'kspere; Ric Wake

Blaque chronology
Blaque (1999)	Blaque Out (2002)

Singles from Blaque
- 1. "808" Released: March 15, 1999; 2. "I Do" Released: July 28, 1999; 3. "Bring It All to Me" Released: October 11, 1999

Blaque (internationally nicknamed Blaque Ivory) is the debut album by the American girl-group Blaque. It was released by Trackmasters Entertainment and Columbia Records on May 19, 1999 in the United States. A R&B and pop album, with hip hop and teen pop influences, the album was certified Platinum by the Recording Industry Association of America (RIAA) on April 10, 2000. and has sold 1.5 million copies to date.

== Critical reception ==
Professional ratings
Review scores
Source	Rating
AllMusic	2.5/5 stars
Entertainment Weekly	C−

AllMusic criticized the album as mediocre "generic urban soul" with "serviceable" production, sometimes hitting the mark but more often not. Entertainment Weekly gave the album a C− grade, criticizing the songs as derivative "mimicry" of other groups, saying that the girls "slide from genre to genre with all the care and discrimination of a bar mitzvah band."

== Track listing ==
No.	Title	Writer(s)	Producer(s)	Length
1.	"Blaque Intro"			0:37
2.	"Roll with Me"	Kevin Briggs; Nicolia Turman; Natina Reed	She'kspere	3:42
3.	"I Do"	Reed	Michael Anthony; Elgin Manson^{[A]}	3:27
4.	"Leny"	R. Peterkin; Billy Lawrence; Isaac Hayes; Lenny Nicholson; Reed; Richard Pimentel; Timothy Riley	Riley; Curt Gowdy	4:20
5.	"Rainbow Drive"	Andre "Sideeq" Jones; Brandi Williams; Reed; Shamari Fears; Marcus Goins	Sideeq "The Beat" Freeq; Goins^{[A]}	3:48
6.	"808"	Robert Kelly; Reed	R. Kelly; Poke & Tone; Cory Rooney^{[A]}	5:06
7.	"Time After Time"	Cyndi Lauper; Rob Hyman	Poke & Tone; Rooney	4:05
8.	"Bring It All to Me" (featuring JC Chasez of NSYNC)	Lawrence; Nidra Sylvers; LeShan Lewis; Linda van Horssen; William Shelby; Kevin Spencer; Violet Ruby; Rooney	Rooney; L.E.S.	3:38
9.	"Mind of a King"	Jones; Reed; Goins	Goins; Freeq	3:57
10.	"Don't Go Looking for Love"	Mariah Carey; Rooney; Samuel Barnes; Jean-Claude Olivier; Steven Ettinger; Darryl Pierce; Dwayne Simon; James Todd Smith; Bobby Ervin	Rooney; Poke & Tone^{[A]}	4:01
11.	"Release Me"	Barnes; Lawrence; Bobby Coleman; Olivier; Rooney; Sting	Poke & Tone; Rooney^{[A]}	3:03
12.	"Right Next to Me"	Kangol	Anthony; Bob Baldwin^{[A]}	5:27
13.	"Stay By Your Side"	Reed; Fears	Anthony; Manson^{[A]}	3:24
14.	"When the Last Teardrop Falls"	Lawrence; Ric Wake; Sheppard Soloman	Wake	4:37

Japanese bonus track
No.	Title	Producer(s)	Length
15.	"808 (remix)"	Poke & Tone	3:55

Notes

- ^{^[A]} denotes co-producer

Sample credits

- "Leny" contains excerpts from the composition "Bumpy's Lament", written and performed by Isaac Hayes.
- "Bring It All to Me" contains excerpts from the composition "I Don't Wanna Be The Last To Know", performed by Shalamar.
- "Don't Go Looking for Love" contains excerpts from the composition "I Need Love", performed by LL Cool J.
- "Release Me" contains elements of "Shape of My Heart", performed by Sting.

== Charts ==
=== Weekly charts ===
Weekly chart performance for Blaque
Chart (1999–2000)	Peak position
Japanese Albums (Oricon)	24
US Billboard 200	53
US Top R&B/Hip-Hop Albums (Billboard)	23

=== Year-end charts ===
Year-end chart performance for Blaque
Chart (2000)	Position
US Billboard 200	155

== Certifications ==
Certifications for Blaque
Region	Certification	Certified units/sales
United States (RIAA)	Platinum	1,000,000^{^}
^{^} Shipments figures based on certification alone.

== Release history ==
Blaque release history
Region	Date	Format(s)	Label(s)	Ref.
Japan	May 19, 1999	CD	Sony Music	
United States	June 1, 1999	CD	Sony Music	
Japan	July 23, 1999	CD	Columbia	
New Zealand	May 8, 2000	Cassette	Columbia	
