= Blaque =

American girl group

- Blaque in 2003

Background information
- Also known as: Blaque Ivory
- Origin: Atlanta, Georgia, U.S.
- Genres: R&B; pop
- Works: Blaque discography
- Years active: 1997–2004 • 2008–2012 • 2019–present
- Labels: Columbia (1997–2003); Elektra
- Members: Shamari Fears; Brandi Williams
- Past members: Natina Reed
- Website: officialblaque.com

Blaque (/ˈblæk/ BLAK) is an American girl group; Blaque had songs chart from 1999 to 2004. Outside of the United States and Canada, they are known as Blaque Ivory. Their self-titled debut album Blaque sold more than 1 million copies and was certified Platinum. The group's debut included the platinum-selling lead single "808"; a second single, "I Do"; and the international pop hit "Bring It All to Me". In 1999, Billboard named Blaque the 4th Best New Artist of the year, with "Bring It All to Me" landing at number 30 on the 2000 Year End Chart. In 2002 and 2003, the group released three less successful singles, "Can't Get It Back", "Ugly", and "I'm Good", the latter appearing in the film Honey.

Blaque worked on two unreleased albums in the mid-to-late 2000s before they disbanded in 2008. The group attempted a comeback in 2012, but it was cut short by Natina Reed's accidental death. In 2019, Blaque's intended third album Torch was released under the label Blaque/The Move Entertainment.

== History ==
=== 1994–1996: Early beginnings ===
In 1994, Shamari Fears formed her first girl group with a rotation of members, including Atlanta high school classmate Natina Reed. They soon met a producer, who was looking for an urban country singing act and took them under his wings, naming the four member band Buutz. Still in training, Reed left the group a year later, after her father Paul, a reverend, no longer agreed with his daughter performing non-religious and secular music. After Reed's departure, Fears connected with vocal coach and manager Cynnamyn Robinson who found a replacement member for Reed and re-named the band Intrigue. With the help of Robinson, the members of Intrigue received dancing and acting classes and were able to acquire further experience in the recording studio. In 1995, twelve-year-old Brandi Williams was added to the group but Intrigue still struggled to secure a record deal.

After her parents' divorce, Reed again began pursuing secular music and met talent scout Ronald Lopes, brother of Lisa "Left Eye" Lopes, while singing jingles to earn extra cash. Lopes, the co-owner of a production company named Blaque House, agreed to manage her and hired Reed to write for his sister's band TLC. In the meantime, he was looking for "an outlet" for Reed, who suggested that he make her part of a new girl group and asked Fears to join the group. In turn, Fears inivited Williams to join. Named after Lopes' company, Blaque was officially formed in 1996. In hopes of securing the trio a jump start to their career, Lopes looked to his sister who began mentoring the group and arranged demo recordings and photo shootings for them. Six months after their formation, Left Eye had them audition for Sony Music CEO Tommy Mottola who offered Blaque a deal with Columbia Records.

=== 1997–2000: Debut and breakthrough ===
Fast-tracking the production of their debut album, Columbia Records set up recording sessions with several producers for the trio, with Jean-Claude Olivier and Samuel Barnes from hip hop production duo Trackmasters eventually emerging as the album's executive producer alongside Left Eye and Cory Rooney. In 1997, the group made a cameo appearance in the video for Lil' Kim's "Not Tonight (Remix)".

Their self-titled debut debuted at number 23 on Billboard's Top R&B/Hip-Hop albums chart, and at number 53 on the official Billboard 200 and was certified platinum by RIAA. The album's lead single "808" was a success in the U.S. reaching number 8 on the Billboard Hot 100 singles chart and earning Gold certification. The follow-up single "I Do" was not a success like the previous singles, reaching number 73 on the R&B/Hip-Hop single chart. The music video for "I Do" was nominated for a MTV Video Music Award for Best Editing. The last single "Bring It All To Me", which featured JC Chasez, was a hit song that made the number 5 position on the Billboard Hot 100 singles chart and topped the Rhythmic charts in late 1999 to early 2000 for six weeks.

In mid-1999, Blaque toured as one of the opening acts for boy band 'N Sync. Blaque also performed as one of the opening acts for TLC's FanMail Tour later that year. In 2000, the group starred as cheerleaders in the film Bring It On and went to the studio and recorded the Shelly Peiken and Guy Roche song "As If" for the soundtrack that same year. A remixed version of the Blaque song "Bring It All To Me" appeared in the film, with added rapping by 50 Cent.

=== 2001–2002: Blaque Out ===
While their self-titled debut album went platinum, the second album called Blaque Out, which was set for release in 2001, was shelved as the group was dropped from Columbia Records for unknown reasons. The video for the first single "Can't Get It Back" was never released. The album was soon leaked on the Internet. After Lopes' death in a car crash in Honduras on April 25, 2002, the group signed with Elektra Records. They began work on their third album after Reed gave birth to a son. An alternate version of the shelved album was released to iTunes on May 22, 2007, but was later taken down. In December 2011, Blaque Out was released back onto iTunes.

=== 2005–2012: Reunion and Reed's death ===
Fears was signed to Darkchild Records in 2005. Williams also signed a new record deal and started working on a solo album. She also provided vocals on the hook of Nelly's single "Grillz". In 2005, Blaque came back together to record their studio album Private Show (originally titled Beauty). They worked on the album sporadically from 2005 to 2009. Blaque agreed to film a show Blaque In the House set to air in the summer of 2008; however, the show was never picked up, and the album went unreleased. Blaque released four songs on YouTube: "Cut You Off", "All Nighter", "Blue Jeans" and "High Definition" before they decided to disband.

On July 28, 2012, Blaque reunited for the Left Eye Music Festival in Decatur near northeast Atlanta. At the event, Blaque performed their single "808". Shortly after, the group contracted with artist manager Inga "Nandi" Willis, and started working on an album and a reality television show. Reed died on October 26, 2012, after being hit by a car near Atlanta. The group broke up shortly after her death. Months later, "Cut You Off", a song intended for their album, leaked via the internet.

=== 2013–2019: Torch, change in lineup ===
Blaque's intended third album, Torch, featured Missy Elliott, songwriter Linda Perry, and producer Rodney Jerkins. The intended single "Blackout" was derided as being a "rip-off" of 50 Cent's song "In da Club".

Torch was scheduled to be released exclusively to iTunes in 2008, nearly five years after its completion by Music World Entertainment, but that was canceled. It has been confirmed that Mathew Knowles owns the rights to the albums Torch and Blaque Out. On May 31, 2019, Blaque released Torch under the label Blaque/The Move Entertainment.

== Other media ==
In addition to being in music, Reed, Fears, and Williams appeared in the 2000 film Bring It On as members of the East Compton Clovers cheerleading squad, fronted by Gabrielle Union. Williams also had a small role (playing herself) in the 2001 movie On the Line. Blaque appears on Lisa "Left Eye" Lopes's 2001 solo debut album, Supernova, on the track titled "Head to the Sky", which was only released internationally. In 2003, Blaque appeared in the final scene of the film Honey, being introduced to the title character, a hip-hop choreographer played by Jessica Alba, by Missy Elliott. In 2005, two clips of Fears's solo songs titled "The One" and "NJ2" were leaked on the internet.

== Discography ==
Studio albums

- Blaque (1999)
- Blaque Out (2002)
- Torch (2019)

== Tours ==
=== Headlining ===
- The Blaque Mall Tour (1999)

Date	City	Country	Venue
May 3	Chicago	United States	River Oaks Center
May 5	Boston	United States	Square One Mall
May 6	New York City	United States	Willowbrook Mall
May 7	Washington, D.C.	United States	Landmark Mall
May 13	San Francisco	United States	Bayfair Mall
May 15	Los Angeles	United States	Westminster Mall

=== Opening Act ===
- NSYNC in Concert (1999)
- TLC: FanMail Tour (1999)

== Awards and nominations ==
MTV Video Music Awards

Year	Result	Category
2000	Nominated	Best Editing In A Video; For: "I Do"

BET Awards

Year	Result	Category
2001	Nominated	Best Female Group; For: "Blaque"

Soul Train Lady Of Soul Awards

Year	Result	Category
1999	Nominated	Best R&B/Soul Or Rap New Artist; For: "808"
2000	Nominated	R&B/Soul Album Of The Year, Group, Band Or Duo; For: "Blaque"

Billboard Video Awards

Year	Result	Category
2000	Won	Best New Artist-R&B; For: "Bring It All To Me"

== Filmography ==
=== Films ===
- 1999: Soul Train (cameo)
- 1999: Motown Live (cameo)
- 2000: Bring It On
- 2000: All That (cameo)
- 2000: Disney's 2 Hour Tour (cameo)
- 2002: V.I.P. (cameo)
- 2003: Honey (cameo)
- 2020: Say Yes To The Dress: Atlanta (cameo)
