= Alesha Dixon discography =

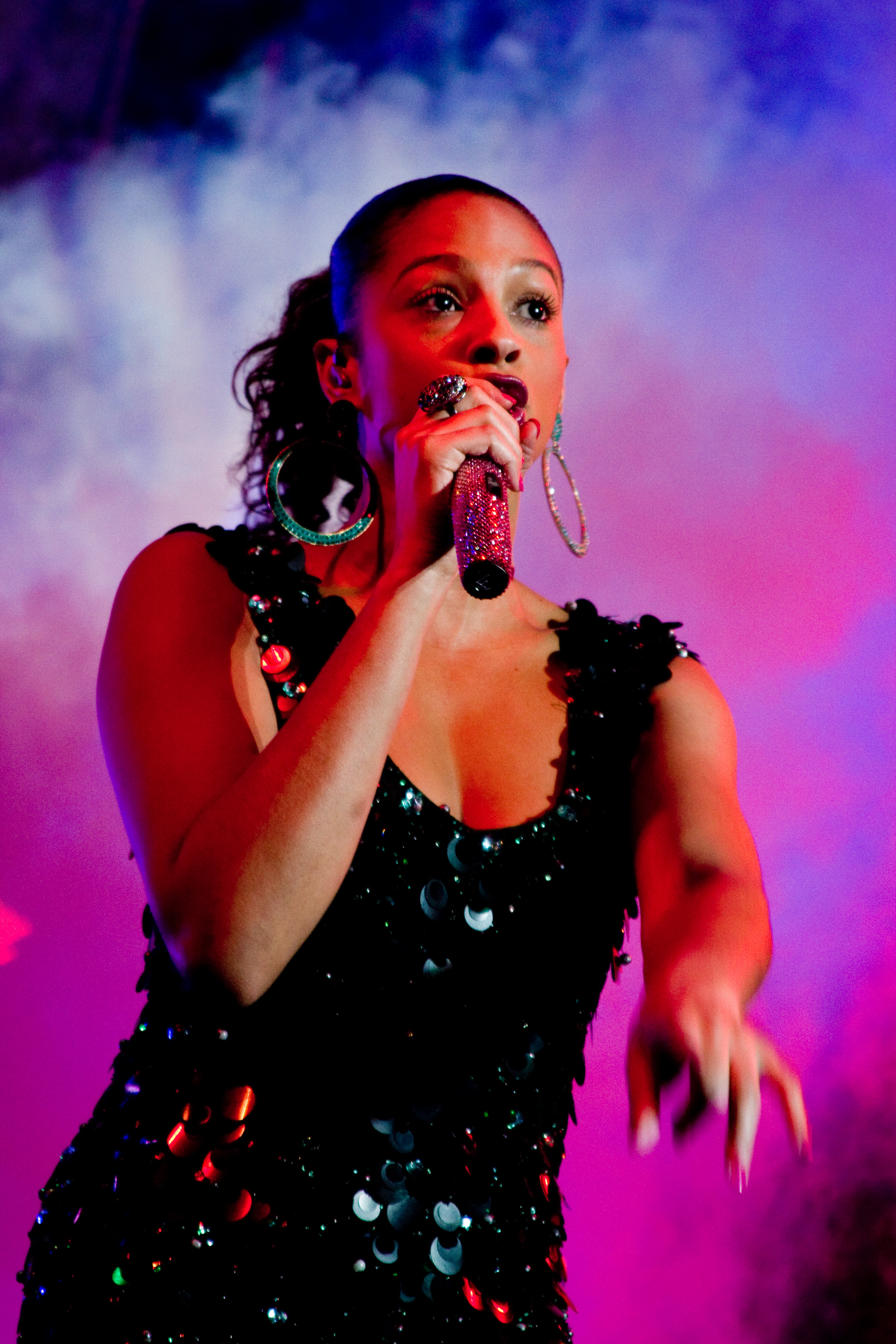
- Studio albums: 4
- Extended plays: 1
- Compilation albums: 1
- Singles: 16
- Music videos: 19
- Featured singles: 3
- Promotional singles: 3

British R&B singer Alesha Dixon has released four studio albums, nine lead singles (not including two singles on which she is featured and three promotional singles) and 13 music videos. Dixon was also a member of the music group Mis-Teeq, together with whom she released four albums and several singles.

Dixon's discography as a solo artist began with the release of "Lipstick" under the mononym "Alesha" on 14 August 2006 in the United Kingdom, intended as the lead single from her album Fired Up. The song reached number 14 on the UK Singles Chart, and was followed by "Knockdown", the poor performance of which caused the album's release to be cancelled and Alesha to be dropped by record label Polydor. Fired Up was released both physically and digitally in Japan, where it reached number 54 on the Japanese Oricon Albums Chart.

Following Dixon's success on BBC reality television programme Strictly Come Dancing, she was signed to Asylum Records to release her second album The Alesha Show. The album yielded four singles, two of which reached the top 10 of the UK Singles Chart. "The Boy Does Nothing" is Dixon's best-selling single release to date and achieved worldwide chart success. The Alesha Show went on to be certified Platinum by the British Phonographic Industry, denoting shipments of 300,000 copies and allowing her to begin recording for her third studio album The Entertainer, which was preceded by the single "Drummer Boy." The album peaked at number 81 on the UK Albums Chart and was not certified, leading to Dixon parting with her record label.

== Albums ==
=== Studio albums ===
List of albums, with selected chart positions, sales figures and certifications
| Title | Album details | Peak chart positions | | | | | | | | | | Certifications |
| Title | Album details | UK | UK R&B | BEL (WA) | FIN | FRA | IRE | JPN | NL | SPA | SWI | Certifications |
|---|---|---|---|---|---|---|---|---|---|---|---|---|
| Fired Up | Released: 20 February 2008; Label: Victor (#64062); Format: CD | — | — | — | — | — | — | 54 | — | — | — | |
| The Alesha Show | Released: 24 November 2008; Label: Warner Music UK (#5051865103325); Formats: CD, digital download | 11 | — | 60 | 23 | 39 | 64 | — | 80 | 23 | 69 | BPI: Platinum |
| The Entertainer | Released: 28 November 2010; Label: Warner Music UK (#5052498253326); Formats: CD, digital download | 84 | 16 | — | — | — | — | — | — | — | — | |
| Do It for Love | Released: 9 October 2015; Label: Precious Stone Records; Formats: CD, digital download | 81 | — | — | — | — | — | — | — | — | — | |

=== Compilation albums ===
| Title | Album details | Notes |
|---|---|---|
| The Ultimate Alesha Mix Show | Released: 22 February 2012; Label: Victor (#65039); Format: CD | Japanese greatest hits album containing selected songs from Dixon's first three studio albums, functioning as a megamix of greatest hits and a selection of album tracks. It served as Dixon's third album release in Japan, after the release of Fired Up and The Alesha Show in 2008. It was again credited under the mononym Alesha. |
| The Boy Does Nothing | Released: 7 August 2020; Label: Warner Music Group; Format: Digital download, streaming | Compilation of songs from multiple albums and promotional releases |

== Extended play ==
| Title | Details |
|---|---|
| Live at the Nokia Green Room (Asylum, 2008) | Features the songs "The Boy Does Nothing" and "Let's Get Excited" performed live and televised on The Nokia Green Room. |

== Singles ==
=== As lead artist ===
List of singles, with selected chart positions and certifications, showing year released and album name
| Title | Year | Peak chart positions | | | | | | | | | | Certifications | Album |
| Title | Year | UK | AUS | CZE | EU | FIN | FRA | IRE | NL | SPA | SWI | Certifications | Album |
|---|---|---|---|---|---|---|---|---|---|---|---|---|---|
| "Lipstick" | 2006 | 14 | — | — | — | — | — | 42 | — | — | — | | Fired Up |
| "Knockdown" | 2006 | 45 | — | — | — | — | — | — | — | — | — | | Fired Up |
| "The Boy Does Nothing" | 2008 | 5 | 8 | 1 | 5 | 2 | 2 | 19 | 5 | 2 | 7 | BPI: Platinum; ARIA: Gold; IFPI FIN: Gold; PROMUSICAE: 2× Platinum | The Alesha Show |
| "Breathe Slow" | 2009 | 3 | — | 12 | 13 | — | — | 18 | — | 20 | — | BPI: Gold | The Alesha Show |
| "Let's Get Excited" | 2009 | 13 | — | — | 40 | 14 | — | 36 | — | — | — | | The Alesha Show |
| "To Love Again" | 2009 | 15 | — | — | — | — | — | — | — | — | — | | The Alesha Show |
| "Drummer Boy" | 2010 | 15 | — | — | 28 | — | — | 23 | — | 26 | — | | The Entertainer |
| "Radio" | 2010 | 46 | — | 44 | — | — | — | — | — | — | 57 | | The Entertainer |
| "Every Little Part of Me" (featuring Jay Sean) | 2011 | 78 | — | — | — | — | — | — | — | — | — | | The Entertainer |
| "The Way We Are" | 2015 | — | — | — | — | — | — | — | — | — | — | | Do It for Love |
| "Tallest Girl" | 2015 | — | — | — | — | — | — | — | — | — | — | | Do It for Love |
| "People Need Love" | 2015 | — | — | — | — | — | — | — | — | — | — | | Do It for Love |
| "Stop" (featuring Wretch 32) | 2016 | — | — | — | — | — | — | — | — | — | — | | Do It for Love |
| "War" | 2021 | — | — | — | — | — | — | — | — | — | — | | Non-album single |
| "Ransom" | 2024 | — (Note: "Ransom" did not enter the UK Singles Chart but debuted and peaked at number 24 on the UK Singles Downloads Chart Top 100.) | — | — | — | — | — | — | — | — | — | | TBA |
| "Chargie" (featuring Tom Moutchi) | 2025 | | | | | | | | | | | | TBA |
"—" denotes single that did not chart or was not released

=== As featured artist ===
| Title | Year | Peak chart positions | Album |
| Title | Year | UK | Album |
|---|---|---|---|
| "Rumours" (Damage featuring Alesha Dixon) | 2000 | 22 | Since You've Been Gone |
| "Dance for Me" (Sunship Vocal Mix) (Mary J. Blige featuring Alesha Dixon) | 2001 | 13 | "Dance for Me" (single) |
| "Take Control" (Roll Deep featuring Alesha Dixon) | 2010 | 29 | Winner Stays On, The Entertainer |
| "Your Love" (Ashley Walters featuring Alesha Dixon) | 2012 | — | Non-album singles |
| "Higher Love" (Oovee featuring Alesha Dixon) | 2018 | — | Non-album singles |
| "Tongue Tied" (Boyzone featuring Alesha Dixon) | 2018 | — | Thank You & Goodnight |
| "What Leaving's All About" (Gary Barlow featuring Alesha Dixon) | 2020 | — | Music Played by Humans |

=== Promotional singles ===
| Single | Year | Peak chart positions | Album |
| Single | Year | UK | Album |
|---|---|---|---|
| "Superficial" | 2006 | — | Fired Up |
| "Colours of the Rainbow" | 2009 | — | Non-album singles |
| "Do It Our Way (Play)" | 2012 | 53 | Non-album singles |
| "Do It for Love" | 2015 | — | Do It for Love |

== Music videos ==
| Song | Year | Director(s) |
|---|---|---|
| "Lipstick" | 2006 | Paul Gore |
| "Knockdown" | 2006 | J.T. |
| "The Boy Does Nothing" | 2008 | Michael Gracey and Pete Commins |
| "Breathe Slow" | 2009 | Max & Dania |
| "Let's Get Excited" | 2009 | Max & Dania |
| "To Love Again" | 2009 | Big TV |
| "Drummer Boy" | 2010 | Ray Kay |
| "Take Control" (Roll Deep featuring Alesha Dixon) | 2010 | Rock Jacobs |
| "Radio" | 2010 | Alex Herron |
| "Every Little Part of Me" (featuring Jay Sean) | 2011 | Nick Frew |
| "We'll Meet Again" (with Vera Lynn) | 2011 | Rupert Bryan |
| "Do it Our Way (Play)" (featuring "Real members of Weight Watchers") | 2011 | —N/a |
| "Your Love" (Ashley Walters featuring Alesha Dixon) | 2012 | —N/a |
| "We Are the Children United" (Children United featuring Alesha Dixon) | 2015 | —N/a |
| "The Way We Are" | 2015 | —N/a |
| "Tallest Girl" | 2015 | De La Muerte Films |
| "People Need Love" (Ash Howes Remix) | 2015 | Alesha Dixon, Thomson |
| "Do It for Love" | 2015 | —N/a |
| "Stop" (featuring Wretch 32) | 2016 | Deadbeat Films |
