= Lizzie Gough =

Elizabeth Anne Gough (born 30 September 1984) is a British dancer, television judge, and dance presenter who came in third during the first series of So You Think You Can Dance. In 2010, she made her first appearance as a judge for the BBC / CBBC television series Alesha's Street Dance Stars. Gough trained in dance at Fitzell Roberts School of Dance in Southampton, and both dance and musical theatre at Laine Theatre Arts, a performing arts college in Epsom, Surrey.

== Early life ==
Gough was born in 1984, and grew up in Bursledon, Southampton, England with her parents and three older brothers until she was sixteen years of age. Gough started dance lessons at the age of four years at the Fitzell Roberts school of dance in Thornhill, Southampton, and it became the main focus of her life. She attended Bursledon Infants and Junior School, before moving on to Hamble Secondary School, now Hamble Community Sports College in Southampton. At the age of fifteen, she appeared in her first professional job, a principal dancer in the Southampton Christmas Pantomime with Ruth Madoc and Maureen Nolan and John Challis.

At the age of sixteen, Gough attended Laine Theatre Arts, a performing arts college in Epsom. She gained a Dance diploma and Imperial Society of Teachers of Dancing (ISTD) Teaching Qualifications for ballet, tap dancing and modern dance. Whilst at Laine Theatre Arts, she was selected as a dancer in the Royal Variety Performance in London 2001, appearing with singers Anastacia and Will Young. She attended extra dance classes at Pineapple Dance Studios in Covent Garden.

== Professional career ==
After graduating from Laine in 2004 Gough moved to London to work as a professional dancer. She trained with various dance groups such as Rudeye, Dance2xs, Plague, and Pineapple Dance Troupe, and she appeared in workout DVDs for Pineapple Studios. In between jobs she taught for Stagecoach Theatre Arts in Kew Gardens.

In 2010, Gough appeared on the first season of So You Think You Can Dance on BBC1, where she gained third place. After appearing on the BBC talent show this increased the momentum of her career.

In May 2010, Gough represented the United Kingdom in the Second Dance World Championship in Mexico, where she was partnered with Benjamin Jones. She replaced Charlie Bruce, who withdrew from the competition in Week 3 (31 May) due to an injury. Team England was eliminated from the competition in Week 4 (6 June).

She became one of the dance captains for the closing ceremony of the London 2012 Summer Olympics, also known as A Symphony of British Music. It was held on 12 August in the Olympic Stadium. The closing ceremony was created by Kim Gavin, Es Devlin, Stephen Daldry, David Arnold and Mark Fisher.

== Theatre work ==
After appearing as a finalist in the TV show So You Think You Can Dance UK this lead Gough to perform in many theatre shows. From Hip Hop Theatre show "Blaze" in February 2010, which premiered at the Peacock Theatre. to a principal dancer in ZooNation's "Some like it Hip Hop" in 2011 – 2013 at the Peacock Theatre London. In between this Gough was also a dancer and choreographer in "Revolution" in May and June 2012 at Theatre Royal Haymarket with Kimberly Wyatt and Adam Garcia. She later appeared with Wyatt and Garcia on the dance program Revolution. Since then she was picked by Fredrik Rydman for his show "Swan Lake Reloaded" International Tour in late 2013 and 2014, a modern take on the original Tchaikovsky ballet with much of the original music.

== Street dance ==
Gough is a judge from 2006–present day for the United Dance Organisation. Gough is one of the professionals that developed the UDO Streetdance syllabus for UDO.

In 2011, 2012, and 2013, Gough appeared as a street dance judge on CBBC's Alesha's Street Dance Stars with Alesha Dixon. This lead Gough to present street dance moves for three episodes of CBBC's How to be Epic Season 2. and for BBC learning zone.
