= The Alesha Show (tour) =

2009 concert tour by Alesha Dixon

- Tour by Alesha Dixon
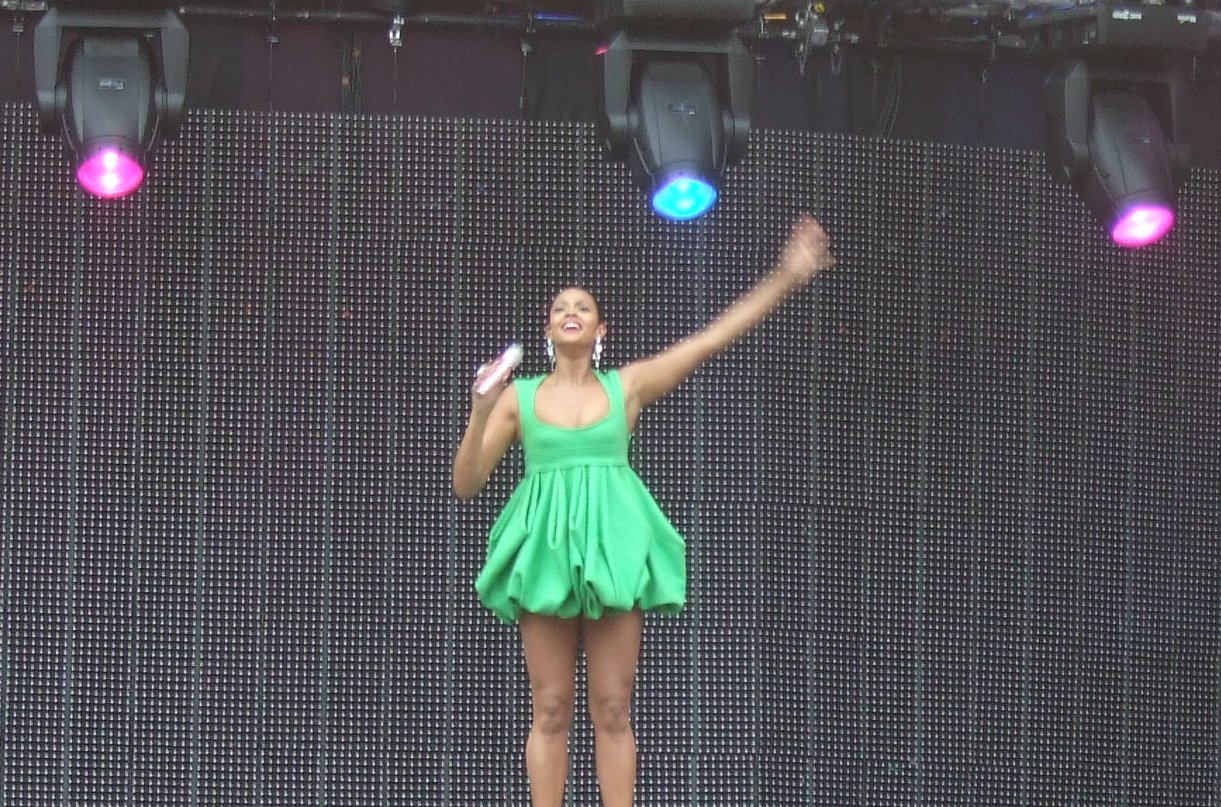
- Location: United Kingdom
- Associated album: The Alesha Show
- Start date: 20 October 2009
- End date: 19 November 2009
- Legs: 1
- No. of shows: 17

The Alesha Show was a 17-date 2009 concert tour of the United Kingdom by Alesha Dixon, to support her second album, The Alesha Show. The Alesha Show is Dixon's first headlining tour as a solo artist. Dixon said in an interview before the tour's announcement that her biggest goal would be to embark on a concert tour, saying, "The whole concept of a stage show is the most exciting part of what you do so to tour it would be fantastic."

== Background ==
Tickets went on general sale in May with members of Dixon's official website having access to the tickets 48 hours before the general sale.

In July 2009, it was confirmed that Dixon would become a judge on Strictly Come Dancing. Because the show is broadcast live on Saturday nights, Dixon had to reschedule three shows in Lincoln, Southampton and Brighton. Tickets purchased for the original dates remained valid. Dixon said her official website, "I'm so sorry to all my fans for having to change some of my dates. I'm really looking forward to playing live. I can't wait for the tour to start as I have been working so hard for a long time to achieve my dream of my first solo tour. I hope everyone can understand due to the emotional connection I have with the show, it was an exciting opportunity I could not turn down."

=== Concert synopsis ===
The main theme of the concerts was a showgirl theme, which Dixon followed throughout, dressing in various showgirl-style costumes and using props such as canes and top hats. The shows typically lasted approximately 70 minutes (excluding the supporting acts' time onstage).

Dixon started the show performing the aptly named track "Welcome to the Alesha Show" whilst descending onto the stage sitting on a giant swing wearing a sequin-clad leotard combined with fishnet tights, which also had sequins sown into them in places.

David Sinclair of The Times commented on "an air of mild hysteria" among the audience at the shows. Caroline Sullivan of The Guardian commented on the show's themes, writing, "Her stage act is best thought of as a Venn diagram that incorporates the showgirl elements of Kylie Minogue and the sassy oomph of Beyoncé, with a set-jawed determination that is hers alone." She continued to note that "the production budget, too, is a fraction of the Kylies and Beyoncés of this world: she makes do and mends with just one costume change and a tireless six-man band." Sullivan reviewed the Shepherd's Bush Empire show, awarding it 4 out of 5 stars, and complimented its "good deal of burlesque-style embellishment". She also complimented vocal ability in concert, writing, "it was her singing that made the impression: she's more powerful than you would imagine, and when pitted against her band at their most blaring, she more than held her own."

== Supporting acts ==
- Elviin
- NICOL aka Nicole Dash Jones

== Setlist ==
The Alesha Show setlist

Act 1:

1. "Welcome To The Alesha Show" (Introduction)
2. "Fired Up"
3. "Let's Get Excited"
4. "Cinderella Shoe"
5. "Chasing Ghosts"

Act 2:
Costume change

6. "Breathe Slow"
7. "Can I Begin" (Acoustic version)
8. "Don't Ever Let Me Go"

Act 3:
Costume change

9. Mis-Teeq Medley ("All I Want", "B With Me", "One Night Stand", "Why?")
10. "Scandalous"
11. "Hand It Over"
12. Dance Break (contains elements of the N.E.R.D song "She Wants to Move")
13. "Play Me"
14. "Lipstick"
15. "Knockdown"
16. "To Love Again"

Encore:
Costume change
Dance Break

17. "The Boy Does Nothing"

== Tour dates ==
Date	City	Country	Venue
20 October 2009	Nottingham	England	Royal Centre
21 October 2009	Reading	England	The Hexagon
23 October 2009	Cardiff	Wales	St David's Hall
26 October 2009	Liverpool	England	Philharmonic Hall
27 October 2009	Glasgow	Scotland	Glasgow ABC
28 October 2009	Newcastle	England	Newcastle City Hall
30 October 2009	Manchester	England	Manchester Apollo
2 November 2009	Cambridge	England	Cambridge Corn Exchange
3 November 2009	Birmingham	England	Birmingham Symphony Hall
4 November 2009	Bristol	England	Colston Hall
6 November 2009	Folkestone	England	Leas Cliff Hall
9 November 2009	Ipswich	England	Regent Theatre
10 November 2009	Southend-on-Sea	England	Cliffs Pavilion
12 November 2009	London	England	Shepherd's Bush Empire
16 November 2009	Lincoln	England	Engine Shed^{[a]}
17 November 2009	Southampton	England	Southampton Guildhall^{[a]}
19 November 2009	Brighton	England	Brighton Dome^{[a]}

Notes

a The Lincoln, Southampton and Brighton dates were rescheduled due to Dixon's role as a judge on Strictly Come Dancing.

== Alterations ==
- During the Manchester concert, Dixon invited 13 members of the audience to dance to "Knockdown" with her on stage.
- During the Birmingham concert there was a technical problem with the live band, which led a delay in the concert. During this time Alesha performed a freestyle rap apologising for the problems, which were resolved during the rap.
