= Do It for Love (Alesha Dixon album) =

Studio album by Alesha Dixon
- Released: 9 October 2015
- Recorded: 2014–2015
- Genres: R&B; garage; EDM
- Label: Precious Stone
- Producers: Chris Ballard; Bert Elliott; Alex James; Count Justice; Harry Sommerdahl; Arno Spires

Alesha Dixon chronology
The Entertainer (2010)	Do It for Love (2015)

Singles from Do It for Love
- 1. "The Way We Are" Released: 21 June 2015; 2. "Tallest Girl" Released: 18 September 2015; 3. "People Need Love" Released: 11 December 2015; 4. "Stop" Released: 24 May 2016

Do It for Love is the fourth studio album by English singer Alesha Dixon. It was released by Precious Stone Records, Dixon's own label, on 9 October 2015 in the United Kingdom. Her first release with independent label Precious Stone following her departure from Asylum Records, Dixon spent a year recording the album, which saw her taking a more active role in selecting co-workers and collaborators for Do It for Love. Chris Ballard, Bert Elliott, Alex James, Count Justice, Harry Sommerdahl, and Arno Spires were consulted to work with her.

The album earned generally mixed to positive reviews from music critics who called it a smorgasbord of modern EDM and pop production. Upon release, Do It for Love peaked at number 81 on the UK Albums Chart. It was preceded by is lead single, "The Way We Are" which was released digitally on 21 June 2015. The album's second and third singles were, respectively, "Tallest Girl" and the new version of "People Need Love," reworked by Ash Rowes. All singles failed to chart on the UK Singles Chart.

== Background ==
In December 2014, Dixon announced that she would be releasing a new single in either March or May 2015. In March 2015, she confirmed that her new single "The Way We Are", would be released on 21 June via her own record label Precious Stone Records. It marked Dixon's first single release in over four years, following 2011's "Every Little Part of Me," as well as her first regular release after her departure from Asylum Records. Commenting on what motivated her to start her own label, Dixon told Billboard in 2020: "It was quite a scary time. I just wanted to put my own team together and do it all on my terms. I called it Do It for Love because I wanted to do it for that reason and no other. The first single out, I made it chart ineligible because I didn't want a chart position. I didn't want to be judged. I spent a year making a record that was like a dream come true. It's such a personal record. I didn't want to have some chart position or sad, negative kind of perspective on that chart position to ruin what was a passion project for me."

== Critical reception ==
Professional ratings
Review scores
Source	Rating
PressPlayOK	3/5 stars
Renowned for Sound	(mixed)

Christopher Bohlsen from Renowned for Sound wrote that the album is "seemingly designed to be a comeback record, a smorgasbord of modern EDM and R&B production." He felt while the "album’s first half [tends] to be the strongest of the bunch, as they bring thumping UK Garage style to the songs, all of which would feel completely at home in a club," none of the songs of the second half impact the same way. Bohlsen cinclued that "ultimately, Do It For Love is a good R&B record, if not a great one, and whilst it has some very catchy and inventive songs, it also has a fair bit of filler in the second half, a trend that seems to have largely recessed in recent years." PressPlayOK found that Do It For Love "seems a wise title, as money really won’t be a concern here. Which is an absolute shame, because even her downtempo jams like "Top of the World." She’s got a familiar, comfortable UK pop sound, the sort of album Louise would probably make these days [...] Dixon certainly does way better than anyone ever expected."

== Track listing ==
No.	Title	Writer(s)	Producer(s)	Length
1.	"Stop" (featuring Wretch 32)	Alesha Dixon; Shaun Barrett; Tom Strahle; Uche Ebele; Obi Ebele; Nathan Fagan-Gayle; Azuka Ononye	DaBeatfreakz	2:53
2.	"Tallest Girl"	Dixon; Alex James; Harry Sommerdahl	James; Sommerdahl	3:19
3.	"Count on You"	Dixon; James; Sommerdahl	James; Sommerdahl	3:07
4.	"Top of the World"	Anthony Arena III; Bert Elliott; Count Justice; David Quinones; Clare Reynolds	Elliott; Justice	3:09
5.	"Do It for Love"	Dixon; James; Sommerdahl	James; Sommerdahl	2:58
6.	"The Way We Are"	Dixon; James; Sommerdahl	James; Sommerdahl	2:45
7.	"People Need Love"	Dixon; Mauli B; Tom Strahle; Amanuel Dermont; U. Ebele; O. Ebele	DaBeatfreakz; Dermont Music	4:08
8.	"The Gift"	Dixon; Chris Ballard; Arno Spires	Ballard; Spires	3:35
9.	"Broken"	Dixon; C. Ballard; Russ Ballard; A. Spires	C. Ballard; A. Spires	3:10
10.	"Azura (Blue Sky)"	Dixon; C. Ballard; A. Spires; Azuka Ononye	C. Ballard; A. Spires	3:11
11.	"Love with Life"	Dixon; C. Ballard; A. Spires	C. Ballard; A. Spires	3:09
12.	"The Way We Are" (Rap Mix)	Dixon; James; Sommerdahl	James; Sommerdahl	2:44

== Charts ==
Chart (2015)	Peak position
UK Albums (Official Charts)	81
UK Independent Albums (Official Charts)	11
UK Album Downloads (Official Charts)	99

== Release history ==
List of release dates, showing region, formats, label, and reference
Region	Date	Format(s)	Label	Ref
United Kingdom	9 October 2015	CD; digital download	Precious Stone	
