= Radio (Alesha Dixon song) =

Single by Alesha Dixon

from the album The Entertainer
- Released: 28 November 2010
- Recorded: 2010
- Genre: R&B
- Length: 3:04
- Label: Asylum
- Songwriters: Emeli Sandé; Shahid Khan
- Producer: Naughty Boy

Alesha Dixon singles chronology
| "Take Control" (2010) | "Radio" (2010) | "Every Little Part of Me" (2011) |

"Radio" is a song by English recording artist Alesha Dixon from her third album, The Entertainer. The song is The Entertainer's second single, after "Drummer Boy" and was released on 28 November, coinciding with the album's release. One of the remixes features rapper Wiley, a member of grime band Roll Deep, whom Dixon collaborated with previously whilst featuring on their single, "Take Control". Dixon performed "Radio" for the first time on Strictly Come Dancing on 14 November.

== Background ==
"Radio" was written by Scottish singer Emeli Sandé and Shahid "Naughty Boy" Khan; Khan also produced the record. Lyrically, the song speaks of a difficult relationship and her refusal to give up and accept the issues. The Klaas remix of "Radio" features rapper Wiley. Dixon is donating all profits from the pre-orders to Children in Need. On 14 November Alesha performed "Radio" for the first time live on BBC One's Strictly Come Dancing, which she was also judging on. Dixon also performed on T4's Koko Pop, and performed "Take Control" with Roll Deep. Additionally, Dixon performed the single on Lorraine on ITV1, presented by Lorraine Kelly.

== Critical reception ==
Critic website Stereo Board stated that "Alesha's fearlessly powerful vocals with an unforgettable, anthemic chorus that is set to make it a sure-fire radio sensation." Female First gave the single four out of five stars, stating there were "in love with it". Others criticised the song, saying it sounded like "Dixon [had] unknowingly sample[d] Robyn's 'Dancing on My Own'". Another positive review, came from Robert Copsey from Digital Spy who gave 4/5 stars for the song, saying "Upon further listening, the reason for her apathetic approach towards ear candy becomes all too clear. "I'm turning up the radio / I'll drown you out / 'Cause I don't want to let you go," she mourns over a combination of jagged beats and throbbing synths that sounds suspiciously like Robyn's own weepy club ballad 'Dancing on My Own'. Nonetheless, the result is Dixon's sturdiest effort since 'Breathe Slow' - and if you're going to have a crack at sad-pop, you may as well look to the Commander in Chief, right?".

== Music video ==
The music video for "Radio" was directed by Alex Herron near Los Angeles. The video is set in an American trailer park. Whilst Dixon is in the video, she isn't the main focus. Instead, the video follows the lives of a feuding couple who live next door to Dixon. Their relationship disintegrates, and a fight erupts, causing a nearby elderly woman to dial 9-1-1. The police arrive, and arrest the man, believe domestic abuse has taken place, and the video ends with the police cars driving off, leaving the woman alone in tears. Throughout the video shots of Dixon singing are interspersed, with her either walking through the trailer park, in her caravan, or outside at night.

Female First stated they were "loving the video", and that Dixon "look[ed] fantastic in her little caravan". However, they criticised the unrealistic set that the couple featured in, saying it as "the biggest trailer [they'd] ever seen" and "shame they couldn't fill it with furniture".

== Track listings ==
- Digital download
1. "Radio" – 3:04
- CD single
1. "Radio" – 3:04
2. "Radio" (7th Heaven Radio Edit) – 3:01
- Digital EP
1. "Radio" – 3:04
2. "Radio" (7th Heaven Club Remix) – 6:39
3. "Radio" (Klaas Remix Edit) (featuring Wiley) – 3:37
4. "Radio" (True Tiger Remix) – 4:00
5. "Radio" (Mutated Forms Remix) – 4:09

== Charts ==
Due to little airplay on radio and music channels the single missed out on the top 40 in the United Kingdom. It did however, become a top 10 hit on the UK R&B Chart, peaking at 10.

| Chart (2010) | Peak position |
|---|---|
| Scotland Singles (OCC) | 45 |
| Slovakia Airplay (ČNS IFPI) | 86 |
| Switzerland (Schweizer Hitparade) | 57 |
| UK Hip Hop/R&B (OCC) | 10 |
| UK Singles (OCC) | 46 |

== Release history ==
| Region | Date | Format | Label |
|---|---|---|---|
| United Kingdom | 28 November 2010 | Digital download | Asylum |
| United Kingdom | 29 November 2010 | CD single | Asylum |
