= Alesha's Street Dance Stars =

Alesha's Street Dance Stars is a competition aired on the CBBC Channel and presented by Alesha Dixon. The judges in Series 1 were Turbo, Kenrick Sandy and Lizzie Gough. In Series 2, Sandy was replaced with Dwayne Nosworthy and Suzette Brissett. In Series 3, Brissett was replaced with Kymberlee Jay. Dance crews of young street dancers compete in a series of auditions, rounds and finals with one crew winning both the title of Alesha's Street Dance Stars and a money-cannot-buy-prize. The first series aired from 22 August 2011 to 2 September 2011. The second series began airing on 20 August 2012.
