= Fired Up (Alesha album) =

Studio album by Alesha Dixon
- Released: 20 February 2008
- Genres: R&B; hip hop soul; reggae
- Length: 54:02
- Labels: Polydor; Victor
- Producers: Peer Åström; Anders Bagge; Craigie; Johnny Douglas; Paul Epworth; Brian Higgins; Matt Rowe; Richard Stannard; Xenomania

Alesha Dixon chronology
Fired Up (2008)	The Alesha Show (2008)

Alternative cover
- Original intended artwork, and updated digital release.

Singles from Fired Up
- 1. "Lipstick" Released: 14 August 2006; 2. "Knockdown" Released: 30 October 2006

Fired Up is the debut solo album by English singer Alesha Dixon (credited mononymously as Alesha). Her first solo project, conceived after the disbandment of her former band, girl group Mis-Teeq, Dixon worked with a variety of producers on the album, including Peer Åström, Anders Bagge, Johnny Douglas, Paul Epworth, Brian Higgins, Richard Stannard, and Xenomania. Initially scheduled for a 6 November 2006 release through Polydor and Victor Entertainment in the United Kingdom, it was postponed indefinitely after Dixon was dropped by Polydor several days before its release.

The album was preceded by two singles, including lead single "Lipstick", a top-twenty hit on the UK Singles Chart, and follow-up "Knockdown". Fired Up eventually received a physical release in Japan and Taiwan in 2008, where it was issued along with new artwork, a re-worked listing order, and additional tracks, including two remixes and the new track "Voodoo". Dixon later exclusively sold Fired Up in the UK as merchandise on her tour, The Alesha Show, supporting the album of the same name.

== Background ==
Dixon launched her solo career after Mis-Teeq's break-up in 2005 and signed a £500,000, three-album deal with Polydor Records. She spent a year writing and recording her solo debut album, working with a wide range of producers including Richard X, Xenomania, Johnny Douglas, Brian Higgins, Estelle and Paul Epworth. During this period, Dixon performed mononymously, known simply as "Alesha".

In June 2005, she announced her first solo single to be "Superficial". However, at the last minute, the song "Lipstick" was chosen as the first single. "Lipstick" was released on 14 August 2006, and charted at 14 on the UK Single Charts. Dixon released her second single "Knockdown" on 30 October 2006, which charted at 25 on the UK Download Chart. However, on the official UK Singles Charts, the single peaked at number 45, falling down to 68 the following week. On 6 November 2006, it was revealed that Dixon had been dropped by her label, Polydor Records. Polydor gave her full rights to her unreleased debut album, Fired Up.

== 15th Anniversary ==
To celebrate the album's 15th anniversary, "Fired Up" was released on "lipstick pink" vinyl on Friday 24 November 2023 (Black Friday Record Store Day). The release was limited to 500 units and marks Dixon's first album release on vinyl. The 15th Anniversary vinyl edition also features updated artwork, which re-creates the original UK artwork (albeit with slightly different font) and contains the album's 12 tracks in the originally-intended running order. On 22 March 2024, a yellow version of the vinyl was released. Similar to the pink version, this was a limited run of 500 units.

== Track listing ==
No.	Title	Writer(s)	Producer(s)	Length
1.	"Hypnotik"	Alesha Dixon; Johnny Douglas; Nina Woodford	Douglas	3:47
2.	"Lipstick"	Anders Bagge; Henrik Janson; Dixon; Peer Åström	Bagge; Åström	2:47
3.	"Fired Up"	Dixon; Douglas; Woodford	Douglas	3:36
4.	"Knockdown"	Dixon; Brian Higgins; Giselle Sommerville; Miranda Cooper; Shawn Lee; Tim "Rolf" Larcom	Higgins; Xenomania	3:05
5.	"Superficial"	Dixon; Douglas; Woodford	Douglas	3:02
6.	"Ting-a-Ling"	Dixon; Richard Stannard; Matthew Rowbottom	Stannard; Matt Rowe; Richard X^{[a]}	3:40
7.	"Free"	Bagge; Dixon; Vula Malinga; Åström	Bagge; Åström	3:30
8.	"Everybody Wants to Change the World"	Craigie Dodds; J'Nay; Dixon	Craigie	3:24
9.	"Let It Go"	Dixon; Douglas; Judie Tzuke	Douglas	2:51
10.	"A Lil' Bit of Love"	Dixon; Douglas; Tzuke	Douglas	4:11
11.	"Turn It Up"	Paul Epworth	Epworth	3:26
12.	"Everywhere I Go"	Dixon; Douglas; Estelle Swaray	Douglas	3:56
13.	"Voodoo" (Asian bonus track)	Dodds; Dixon	Douglas	3:02
14.	"Lipstick" (Agent X Remix) (bonus track)	Bagge; Janson; Dixon; Åström	Bagge; Åström; Agent X^{[a]}	5:09
15.	"Knockdown" (K-Gee Heat Remix) (featuring Asher D) (bonus track)	Dixon; Higgins; Sommerville; Cooper; Lee; Larcom; Ashley Walters	Higgins; Xenomania; KayGee^{[a]}	4:23

Enhanced CD bonus features
No.	Title	Length
16.	"Lipstick" (music video)	3:01
17.	"Knockdown" (music video)	3:51

2023 digital deluxe edition bonus tracks
No.	Title	Length
13.	"Voodoo"	3:02
14.	"4 U I Will"	4:56
15.	"Lipstick" (Bodybangers Edit)	2:32
16.	"Knockdown" (Charming Horses Remix)	2:10
17.	"Superficial" (Keys & Copper Remix)	2:57
18.	"Lipstick" (Agent X Remix)	5:09
19.	"Knockdown" (K-Gee Heat Remix) (featuring Asher D)	4:23

Notes

- ^{^[a]} signifies additional producer
- The bonus tracks present on the standard edition do not appear on the 2023 vinyl release.

== Charts ==
Chart (2008)	Peak position
Japanese Albums (Oricon)	54

== Release history ==
List of release dates, showing region, formats, and label
Region	Date	Format(s)	Label
Japan	20 February 2008	CD; digital download	Victor
Thailand	31 March 2008	CD	Victor
UK	24 November 2023	Vinyl (Pink version)	Back on Wax / Absolute Records / Precious Stone Records
UK	22 March 2024	Vinyl (Yellow version)	Back on Wax / Absolute Records / Precious Stone Records
