= The Nokia Green Room =

The Nokia Green Room is a TV show that aired on the Channel 4 in the United Kingdom, starting in 2008. The show, that telecast music performances, was sponsored by Nokia and their music service named "Comes with Music".

== Overview ==
The show began airing in April 2008 and consisted of live music performances, as well as the acts being monitored backstage in 'The Green Room', via hidden cameras.

Artists who have performed on the show include:

- Alesha Dixon
- Ashlee Simpson
- Cage The Elephant
- Chris Brown
- The Courteeners
- Feeder
- The Feeling
- Gnarls Barkley
- Guillemots
- The Jonas Brothers
- Kelly Rowland
- Late of the Pier
- Mystery Jets
- Robyn
- The Saturdays
- The Script
- Shaggy

The Nokia Green Room Christmas Special aired in December 2008 and featured performances by:

- Alesha Dixon
- Lemar
- McFly
- Scouting For Girls
- Sugababes

It is filmed at Riverside Studios, London.
