= Do It Our Way (Play) =

Single by Alesha Dixon
- Released: 1 January 2012
- Recorded: 2011
- Genre: R&B; funk
- Length: 3:14
- Label: Saatchi & Saatchi
- Songwriter(s): Nigel Butler; Alesha Anjanette Dixon; Ray Hedges

Alesha Dixon singles chronology
"Every Little Part of Me" (2011)	"Do It Our Way (Play)" (2012)	"The Way We Are" (2015)

"Do It Our Way (Play)" is a song performed by British recording artist Alesha Dixon. It was released on 1 January 2012 to digital outlets in the United Kingdom and Ireland. Co-written by Dixon herself, Ray Hedges and Nigel Butler and produced by Hedges and Butler, the song was written and released as a promotional single to complement advertising by weight loss company Weight Watchers. The television advert (doubling as a music video), when aired in full, was one of the longest to ever run on British television. Dixon features alongside over 180 "success stories" of the Weight Watchers programme in the video. Despite critics noting comparisons between the song and Jessie J's "Price Tag" (2011), it reached number 53 on the UK Singles Chart the week following its release.

== Background ==
Dixon has stated via Twitter that she "wrote the song for the advert [...] to empower people 2 [sic] feel good in their own skin." Dixon also notes, " it's not about 'Me', it's about the people in the advert, I wrote the song so they could tell their story, they were amazing!"

The song samples "Big Big World" by Emilia Rydberg. It was also released on an independent label, Saatchi and Saatchi.

== Music video ==
The advert for Weight Watchers New Year campaign, which featured the song, was used as the official video.

== Track listing ==
Digital download/Promo CD

1. "Do it Our Way (Play)" – 3:14

Digital download

1. "Do it Our Way (Play)" – 3:14
2. "Do it Our Way (Play)" (music video) – 3:23

== Chart performance ==
Chart (2012)	Peak position
Scotland (OCC)	58
UK Indie (OCC)	7
UK Singles (OCC)	53

== Release history ==
Region	Date	Format	Label
United Kingdom	1 January 2012	Digital download	Saatchi & Saatchi
Ireland	9 January 2012	Digital download	Saatchi & Saatchi
