= The Entertainer (Alesha Dixon album) =

Studio album by Alesha Dixon
- Released: 26 November 2010
- Genre: R&B
- Length: 41:14
- Label: Asylum
- Producer: Daniel J. Baker; Busbee; Johnny Dunne; Toby Gad; Joe Hirst; Shama "Sak Pase" Joseph; Naughty Boy; Alan Sampson; Antwoine "Troy NoKā" Collins; Slick & Magic; The Stereotypes; Nate Walka; Laze & Royal

Alesha Dixon chronology
The Alesha Show (2008)	The Entertainer (2010)	Do It for Love (2015)

Singles from The Entertainer
- 1. "Drummer Boy" Released: 23 August 2010; 2. "Take Control" Released: 31 October 2010; 3. "Radio" Released: 28 November 2010; 4. "Every Little Part of Me" Released: 27 February 2011

The Entertainer is the third studio album by English singer Alesha Dixon. It was first released by Asylum Records on 29 November 2010 in the United Kingdom. A tougher album with lots of different layers, Dixon worked with a variety of musicians on the album, including a larger number of American producers such as Jim Beanz, Busbee, Toby Gad, Rodney Jerkins and The Stereotypes, as well as British DJ Naughty Boy and frequent collaborators such as the Danish duo Soulshock & Karlin. Originally planned to be named Unleashed, The Entertainer was decided upon instead.

The Entertainer received generally mixed to positive reviews from music critics many of whom praised the strong, radio-friendly productions but felt that it lacked unique characteristics. Commercially, the album failed to reprise the commercial success of her previous effort The Alesha Show (2008). It debuted and peaked at number 84 on the UK Albums Chart and reached number 16 on the UK R&B Chart. Lead single, "Drummer Boy", was released in September 2010 and peaked at number 15 on the UK Singles Chart but subsequent singles such as "Radio" failed to enter the top 40.

== Background and development ==
Dixon began work on her third studio album The Entertainer in early 2010. In March, she flew to Denmark to begin recording with duo Soulshock & Karlin, the producers of her former single "Breathe Slow". In the following weeks, Dixon secured recording sessions with American producers Rodney "Darkchild" Jerkins, and Jim Beanz. Dixon herself later confirmed via a diary update on her official site that she had recorded two new tracks with Soulshock & Karlin and also revealed she had finished recording a new track named "Bionic". Dixon described "Bionic" as "a powerful, fun, quirky song all about being strong when life tests you". On 16 June Dixon revealed on a post on her fansite that the upcoming album is to be called Unleashed, and on 30 June her fansite president revealed the lead single was a track called "Drummer Boy", produced by Haitian-American producer, Shama "ShamRock" Joseph.

Dixon stated that for The Entertainer, she was departing from the image of her previous album The Alesha Show, and chose to rap in some of the album's songs again, like she once did as member of girlband Mis-Teeq. Dixon stated with regards to The Entertainer: "The album shows lots of different layers. There's character songs like "Drummer Boy", "Baddest Chick", "The Entertainer" that are really about playing a role. And then there are songs like "Cool with Me" and "Love in a Box" that deal with real issues." She also stated her ambitions to release the album in the United States in a BBC interview. Dixon described the album in an interview with Company magazine, commenting: "I think this album is the one people expected me to do when I left Mis-Teeq", also describing it as "a lot tougher".

== Critical reception ==
Professional ratings
Review scores
Source	Rating
AllMusic	4/5 stars
Daily Express	3/5 stars
The Independent	1/5 stars
musicOMH	3/5 stars
Yahoo! Music	7/10 stars
Virgin Media	3/5 stars

The Entertainer received mixed to positive reviews from music critics. Matthew Chisling from AllMusic rated it 4 stars out of 5 and wrote positively that: "Every line to every song on The Entertainer is brassy, reflecting a more confident and sexy pop star" and "Few artists in 2010 are able to blend hip-hop, rap, dance, and pop in one 12-pack of song"; Chisling further say that: "It's hard to tell so early in Alesha's solo career whether she'll be more of a household name over the next few years, but a follow-up release this promising from a solo pop-hop female vocalist, as Alesha puts it herself, has not been found since Rihanna's third album, Good Girl Gone Bad. Alesha isn't just making a claim; an entertainer, she definitely is". Ash Dosanjh of Yahoo! Music wrote that Dixon "displays an ability to effortlessly fuse mainstream pop with bombastic R&B and dance beats" and noticed that The Entertainer "triumphs as an album surging with mischievous attitude rather than surly aggression".

Johnny Dee of Virgin Media noticed that "it's the full on pop tracks that work best: "Radio", "Colour" and "Cool With Me" are all huge sing-along anthems, while guest raps from Roll Deep and Wiley [...] give the album a little grimy edge". Simon Gage from Daily Express wrote that Dixon is "still turning out credible pop/dance tracks" and felt that the album "can hold its head up among the Rihannas of this world if not the Lady Gagas". Michael Ashton of musicOMH described The Entertainer as "an album of diverse dance floor tracks that emulates some of pop and R&B's recent omnipresent female chart toppers such as Rihanna, Cheryl Cole and Lady Gaga" and praised the songs "Radio" and "Every Part of Me", but ultimately felt that it "fails to satisfy as a coherent album". Andy Gill from The Independent gave a negative review, saying that "the music is anonymous, nibbling technopop inflated to cumbersome size, over which Alesha's voice is treated into similar anonymity, delivering the usual vapid sentiments with the usual bogus attitude" and awarding the album one out of five stars.

== Promotion ==
As a judge on Strictly Come Dancing, she performed live during week 7 of series 8. She appeared on Tamil Television Network, TTN to promote The Entertainer and her single "Drummer Boy". In 2010, in order to promote her singles and her new album, Dixon appeared at many festival, including Freedom Festival She later performed at MOBO Awards 2010 at Liverpool. Alesha later announced that she will be travelling to the United States to promote her album, for an April release.

=== Singles ===
"Drummer Boy" which was officially released 23 August 2010, was written by Shama Joseph, Nate Walka, Deodrick Jackson, James Riles. The single was heavily praised, by the BBC, Popjustice. Fraser McAlpine said he was "delighted to report that it is enjoyment all the way". The single was accompanied by a music video which was directed by Norwegian director Ray Kay, with the shoot taking place in Los Angeles. "Drummer Boy" eventually debuted at number 15 on the UK Singles Chart. It was announced in the middle of September 2010, that "Take Control" would be Roll Deep's third single from their debut album, Winner Stays On, and Dixon would feature guest vocals on the single. It was Alesha's first collaboration. With very little promotion the single charted at number 29 on the UK Singles Chart.

"Radio" was confirmed at the second official single, released from The Entertainer. Alesha performed the song on Strictly Come Dancing on 14 November 2010. The single was written by Scottish singer-songwriter, Emeli Sandé and Shahid Khan. The reception of the song was positive, with one critic comparing the song to Robyn's "Dancing on My Own". However, despite promotion in the form of performances on high-profile programmes such as Strictly Come Dancing, the song was a commercial failure, and stalled outside of the Top 40. "Every Little Part of Me" is the third single released from 'The Entertainer'. It features English urban singer Jay Sean. Dixon confirmed this, just before the release of "Radio". The video was released on 13 January 2011 on YouTube. It is to be released on 27 February digitally in the United Kingdom, and physically a day after; the song was released onto the United States iTunes on 22 February.

== Track listing ==
The Entertainer – Standard edition
No.	Title	Writer(s)	Producer(s)	Length
1.	"Baddest Chick"	Alesha Dixon; Ray Romulus; Johnathan Yip; Jeremy Reeves; Nate Walka	Stereotypes; Walka	3:36
2.	"Radio"	Shahid "Naughty Boy" Khan; Emeli Sandé; Ben Scurr	Naughty Boy	3:04
3.	"Every Little Part of Me" (featuring Jay Sean)	Michael Hannides; Anthony Hannides; Alan Sampson; Jay Sean	Slick & Magic	3:21
4.	"Take Control" (with Roll Deep)	Adam Ali; Ibrahim Atherty; Daniel J. Baker; Jason Black; Johnny Dunne; Joe Hirst; Richard Cowie; Matthew Reid; Ryan Williams; Victoria Akintola; Kassa Alexander; Sirach Charles	Baker; Joe Hirst; Johnny Dunne	4:25
5.	"Drummer Boy"	Shama "Sak Pasé" Joseph; Walka; Deodrick Jackson; James Riles	Joseph	3:45
6.	"The Entertainer"	Hannides; Hannides	Slick & Magic	3:40
7.	"Colour"	Hannides; Hannides; Alan Sampson	Slick & Magic; Sampson	2:58
8.	"Tug of War"	Dixon; Romulus; Yip; Reeves; Walka	Stereotypes	3:43
9.	"On Top"	Romulus; Yip; Reeves; Heather Bright	Stereotypes	3:25
10.	"La La La"	Dixon; busbee; Alex James; Antwoine Collins	Antwoine "Troy NoKā" Collins	2:48
11.	"Cool with Me"	Dixon; Toby Gad; James	Gad	3:42
12.	"Radio" (Klaas remix edit) (featuring Wiley) (bonus track)	Khan; Sandé; Scurr; Cowie		3:37

The Entertainer – European Spotify edition (bonus track)
No.	Title	Writer(s)	Length
13.	"Download Me"	Bennett Armstrong; Justyn Armstrong; Dwight Johnson; Alex Cantrall; Christian "Davis" Stalnecker	3:51

The Entertainer – Enhanced CD edition (digital content)
No.	Title	Writer(s)	Length
13.	"Love in a Box"	Khan; Sandé; Matthew Marston	3:01
14.	"Download Me"	Armstrong; Armstrong; Johnson; Cantrall; Stalnecker	3:51

The Entertainer – 2023 digital deluxe edition (bonus tracks)
No.	Title	Writer(s)	Length
13.	"Ice Cold Summer"	Joseph; Theron Thomas; Timothy Thomas	3:21
14.	"Love in a Box"	Khan; Sandé; Matthew Marston	3:01

The Entertainer – iTunes Store deluxe edition (bonus videos)
No.	Title	Length
15.	"Drummer Boy" (music video)	3:48
16.	"Radio" (music video)	3:29

== Charts and sales ==
Chart (2010)	Peak position
Scottish Albums (OCC)	100
UK Albums (OCC)	84
UK R&B Albums (OCC)	16

According to the artist, the album sold 60,000 units.

== Release history ==
List of release dates, showing region, formats, and label
Region	Date	Format(s)	Label
United Kingdom	26 November 2010	Digital download	Asylum
United Kingdom	29 November 2010	CD	Asylum
Italy	10 May 2011	CD; Digital download	East West
Japan	25 May 2011	CD; Digital download	Victor
