= Every Little Part of Me =

Single by Alesha Dixon featuring Jay Sean

from the album The Entertainer
- Released: 27 February 2011
- Recorded: 2010
- Genre: R&B; electrohop
- Length: 3:21
- Label: Asylum; Atlantic
- Songwriters: Michael Hannides; Anthony Hannides; Alan Sampson; Jay Sean
- Producers: Slick & Magic

Alesha Dixon singles chronology
"Radio" (2010)	"Every Little Part of Me" (2011)	"Do It Our Way (Play)" (2012)

Jay Sean singles chronology
"Hit the Lights" (2011)	"Every Little Part of Me" (2011)	"What Happened to Us" (2011)

"Every Little Part of Me" is a song by British singer Alesha Dixon, released in February 2011 as the third and final single from Dixon's third studio album, The Entertainer. The song features guest vocals from fellow British Asian singer, Jay Sean. It was written by Alan Sampson, Jay Sean, Anthony Hannides and Michael Hannides, and produced by Slick & Magic.

== Background ==
The song was written by Michael Hannides, Anthony Hannides, Alan Sampson and Jay Sean and was recorded in 2010. Dixon stated in an interview "Jay and I have been good friends for a while now and we have always said that we wanted to collaborate. We have both worked with this producer, [Alan Sampson], before; he is the guy who produced 'Ride It' for Jay. He had us listen to "Every Little Part of Me" and we absolutely loved it."

== Critical reception ==
Matthew Chisling from AllMusic said, that: "Nearly every track is crafted to radio perfection, whether via the slick pop hook on "Every Little Part of Me," featuring the multifaceted Brit pop star Jay Sean—Alesha leaves you craving more tunes to bump and grind along to". Robert Copsey of Digital Spy gave the song 3 out of 5 stars, stating: "'Every Little Part of Me' is a neat enough garage-pop club number, with juddering synths and a hip-shaking chorus that feels more 'Alesha' than much of her recent output, but it never quite manages to tingle our excitable places – Jay Sean cameo or no Jay Sean cameo". CBBC Newsround stated, "Alesha is on cracking form with Every Little Part of Me, a dance track with strong vocals and buzzing bass beats. It's the third single from her album The Entertainer, and very entertaining it is too! She's teamed up with British singer Jay Sean here, and we think their voices sound ACE together." However, they did stated that the song was not as infectious as "Drummer Boy". Michael Ashton of musicOMH praised "Every Little Part of Me" saying "Every Little Part of Me" is definitely one of the stand out tracks. The vocals from Dixon and Sean just fit perfectly together.

== Music video ==
The music video was filmed in December 2010 in Miami, and was directed by Nick Frew. The video was produced by Flynn (Ryan Lough for Dirty Robber, Jacob Swan Hyam – produced the video for company, Flynn). The video features both Alesha Dixon and Jay Sean. The video sees Dixon performing the song inside a carpark at night, with a white Mercedes-Benz in the background; then the video skips to Sean, driving the same car throughout Miami, with his face partially obscured by a scarf. Then, Alesha is seen walking across the rooftop of a building, with the Miami skyline in the background, carrying a large bag, and wearing a scarf, concealing her face too. It is made apparent that she has performed some sort of heist when the pair rendezvous in the empty carpark, but the police arrive and arrest the pair of the scene. The two are last seen be dragged away by police into separate vehicles to be arrested, and the words "to be continued..." appear. A 30-second trailer appeared on YouTube on 10 January, and 3 days later the full length version was released; it has since accumulated over 5,000,000 views. RWD magazine stated Dixon and Sean were "the new Bonnie and Clyde".

== Track listing ==
- Digital EP
1. "Every Little Part of Me" – 3:21
2. "Every Little Part of Me" (Steve Smart + Westfunk Remix) [featuring Jay Sean]
3. "Every Little Part of Me" (Mike Delinquent Project Remix) [featuring Jay Sean]
4. "Every Little Part of Me" (Self Taught Beats Remix) [featuring Jay Sean]
5. "Every Little Part of Me" (Culture Shock Remix) [featuring Lomaticc & Sunny Brown & Jay Sean]
- Digital download
1. "Every Little Part of Me" – 3:21

== Chart performance ==
On 6 March 2011, "Every Little Part of Me" entered the UK Singles Chart at number 78, making it Dixon's lowest charting single to date.

== Charts ==
Weekly chart performance for "Every Little Part of Me"
Chart (2011)	Peak position
Scottish Singles Sales (Official Charts)	77
Slovakia Airplay (ČNS IFPI)	35
UK Singles (Official Charts)	78
UK Hip Hop/R&B (Official Charts)	25

== Release history ==
Release dates and formats for "Every Little Part of Me"
Region	Date	Format(s)	Label(s)	Ref(s).
United Kingdom	26 November 2010	Digital download	Asylum Records	
United States	22 February 2011	Digital download	Warner Music	
United Kingdom	27 February 2011	Digital EP	Asylum Records	
