= The Way We Are (song) =

Single by Alesha Dixon

from the album Do It for Love
- Released: 19 June 2015
- Genre: UK garage (DJ Q mix)
- Length: 2:44
- Label: Precious Stone Records
- Songwriter(s): Alesha Dixon; Alex James; Harry Sommerdahl
- Producer(s): Harry Sommerdahl

Alesha Dixon singles chronology
"Do It Our Way (Play)" (2012)	"The Way We Are" (2015)	"Tallest Girl" (2015)

"The Way We Are" is a song by English recording artist Alesha Dixon. It is the lead single from her fourth studio album, Do It for Love (2015). The song marks as a return to Dixon's UK garage-style earlier work with the girl group Mis-Teeq. The single was debuted on Britain's Got Talent at the fourth semi final; the live performance of the song subsequently gained over 7 million views on YouTube and the music video of Dixon's single has also amassed over 6 million views.

== Critical reception ==
Following its release "The Way We Are" has received positive to mixed reviews. The single has been referred as her "best song since 2008". Lewis Corner of Digital Spy commented positively on the track, describing it as "an uptempo garage anthem with a hint of her former band Mis-Teeq about it." "The Way We Are" was also chosen as the "Song of the Day" by ABitofPopMusic.com.

== Music video ==
The video premiered on Dixon's official YouTube channel on 19 May 2015. The music video begins with Dixon in a hotel room hers he then begin to sing and look longingly out of a window. She then begin to dance by a pool and enjoy the sun, the video also features Dixon along with several dancers performing the song on a sunlit beach and outside rustic building. Dixon then begin dancing and then begins to dance slower in the wind wearing pink flowing dress.

== Live performance ==
Dixon performed a rap mix of the single on Britain's Got Talent on 27 May 2015.

== Track listing ==
Digital download

1. "The Way We Are" – 2:44

Digital download – Rap Mix

1. "The Way We Are" (Rap Mix) – 2:43

Digital download – Remixes

1. "The Way We Are" (DJ Q Radio Edit Mix) – 2:49
2. "The Way We Are" (DJ Q Extended Vocal Mix) – 4:01
3. "The Way We Are" (Stereo Lights Remix) – 3:38

== Release history ==
Region	Date	Format	Label
Ireland	19 June 2015	Digital download	Precious Stone Records
United Kingdom	21 June 2015	Digital download	Precious Stone Records
