= Knockdown (song) =

Single by Alesha

from the album Fired Up
- Released: 30 October 2006
- Recorded: 2006
- Genre: R&B; reggae
- Length: 3:05
- Label: Polydor
- Songwriters: Alesha Dixon; Brian Higgins; Giselle Sommerville; Miranda Cooper; Shawn Lee; Tim "Rolf" Larcom
- Producer: Xenomania

Alesha Dixon singles chronology
"Lipstick" (2006)	"Knockdown" (2006)	"The Boy Does Nothing" (2008)

"Knockdown" is a song by English singer Alesha Dixon. It was taken from her debut album Fired Up. The single was commercially released on 30 October 2006, having been made available for legal download the previous week. The song was written by Dixon and the Kent-based production team, Xenomania.

"Knockdown" peaked at number forty-five on the UK Singles Chart, becoming Dixon's lowest charting single to that point and spending just four weeks on the chart. As a result of the single's failure, Dixon was dropped from Polydor Records.

== Music video ==
Alesha Dixon in the music video

In the music video, Alesha is in a room pondering out the window and the room breaks up and you see she is around a studio. Alesha is also seen in a black and white outfit with shoulder-length black hair and a bowler hat dancing with backup dancers. She is also seen in an elegant 1950s style dress singing into an old-fashioned microphone. Toward the end of the music video, the song blends into the K-Gee remix, which featuring Alesha rapping. There is also an alternate version of the video where there is no excerpt from the K-Gee Remix at the end of the video, but is the original ending. Directed by JT.

== Track listing ==
=== CD / download ===
1. "Knockdown" – 3:06
2. "Knockdown (K-Gee Heat Remix)" (featuring Asher D) – 4:21

== Charts ==
Chart (2006)	Peak position
UK Singles (OCC)	45
Scotland Singles (OCC)	56
