= Lipstick (Alesha song) =

2006 single by Alesha Dixon

Single by Alesha

from the album Fired Up
- B-side: "Agent X Remix"
- Released: 14 August 2006
- Recorded: 2006
- Genre: R&B
- Length: 2:47
- Label: Polydor
- Songwriters: Alesha Dixon; Anders Bagge; Peer Åström; Henrik Jansen
- Producers: Bagge; Åström

Alesha singles chronology
"Lipstick" (2006)	"Knockdown" (2006)

"Lipstick" is the debut solo single by former Mis-Teeq singer Alesha Dixon, from her debut solo album Fired Up (2006). Produced by Anders Bagge and Peer Åström of Murlyn Music, the song peaked at No. 14 on the UK Singles Chart.

== Song information ==
The music video for the single was released on television in the UK in the last three weeks of July 2006, and the single was released on 14 August 2006, peaking at No. 14 on the UK Singles Chart. Unusually for singles at the time, downloads were repressed to tie-in with the week of the physical release. The single was not commercially released outside of the UK and Ireland, and has only been available on import in Europe. "Lipstick" was chosen as the main promotional song for the Japanese release of Fired Up.

== Formats & track listings ==
These are the formats and track listings of major single releases of "Lipstick".

CD single

1. "Lipstick" (Album Version) – 2:47
2. "Lipstick" (Agent X Remix) – 5:08

Digital download / CD promo

1. "Lipstick" (Al Stone Mix) – 2:47

Remix promo CD

1. "Lipstick" (Ignorants Remix) (featuring Shystie) – 3:41
2. "Lipstick" (Ignorants Instrumental) – 3:41
3. "Lipstick" (The Brooklyn Moxie Clean Edit) – 3:37
4. "Lipstick" (The Brooklyn Moxie Instrumental) – 3:37
5. "Lipstick" (The Brooklyn Moxie Dirty Edit) – 3:37
6. "Lipstick" (The Brooklyn Moxie Accapella) – 3:17

== Music video ==
Alesha Dixon in the video

The music video for "Lipstick", which was directed by Paul Gore was recorded during June 2006 and was edited during July 2006 and was released on the last three weeks of July 2006 on music video channels in UK. In the music video, Dixon wears a tight black shirt with matching black short trousers. She has dancers in similar attire, and she is in a hallway with lipstick in her hand as she drags it across the dilapidated walls. She is also in a room where you could see chandeliers surrounding her as she performs.

== Charts ==
Chart (2006)	Peak position
Ireland (IRMA)	42
Scotland Singles (OCC)	17
UK Singles (OCC)	14

Chart (2008)	Peak position
Japan (Japan Hot 100)	14
