= Alesha Dixon =

English singer and dancer (born 1978)

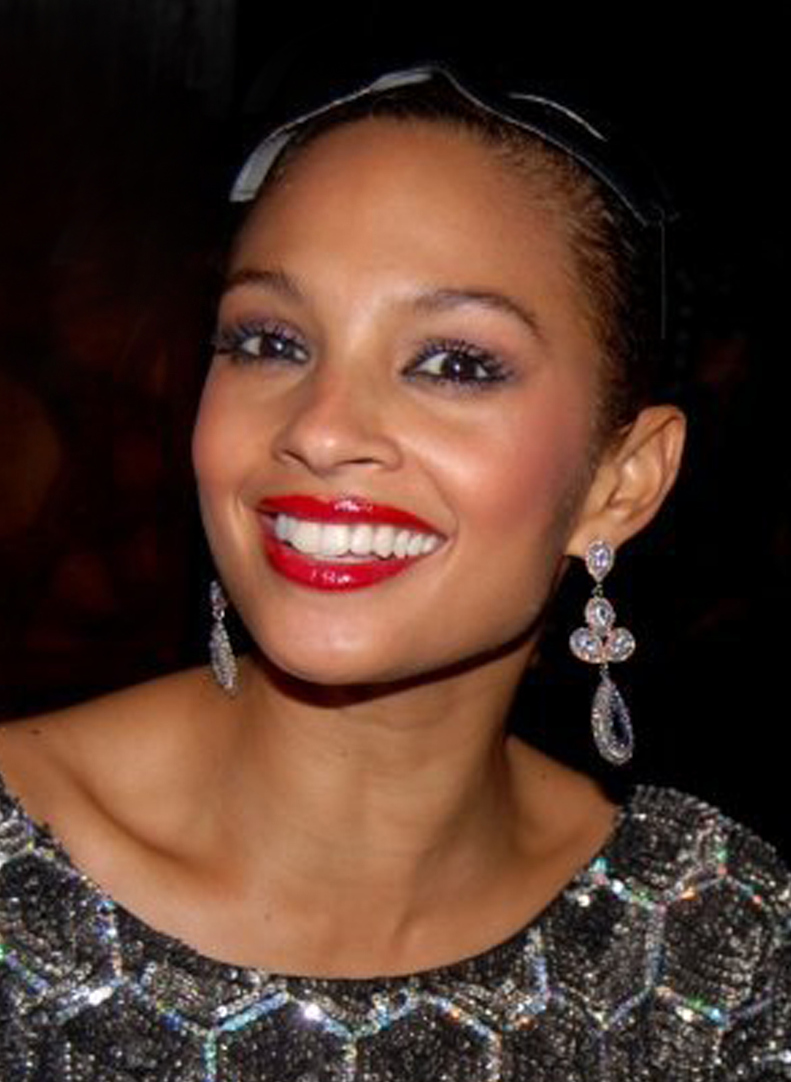
- Dixon in 2009
- Born: Alesha Anjanette Dixon; 7 October 1978 (age 48); Welwyn Garden City, Hertfordshire, England
- Occupations: Singer; rapper; television personality; dancer; author
- Spouses: Harvey (m. 2005; div. 2006); Azuka Ononye (m. 2017, separated)
- Children: 2
- Musical career
- Genres: R&B; pop; garage; hip-hop
- Instrument: Vocals
- Years active: 1999–present
- Labels: Polydor; Asylum; Atlantic; Victor; Warner; Precious Stone
- Member of: Mis-Teeq
- Website: aleshadixon.com

Alesha Anjanette Dixon (born 7 October 1978) is an English singer, rapper and television personality. She gained recognition in the early 2000s as a member of the R&B and garage group Mis-Teeq, who had seven consecutive UK top 10 singles, two top 10 double platinum albums, and sold over 12 million records worldwide.

After Mis-Teeq disbanded in 2005, Dixon signed with Polydor Records to release her debut solo album, Fired Up (2006); due to insufficient commercial reception from its lead singles, "Lipstick" and "Knockdown", she was dropped from Polydor. She then signed with Asylum Records to release her second album, The Alesha Show (2008), which was certified platinum by the British Phonographic Industry (BPI) and produced the successful singles "The Boy Does Nothing" and "Breathe Slow", the latter of which became her highest charting single and earned her a Brit Award nomination. She went on to release the albums The Entertainer (2010) and Do It for Love (2015).

In 2007, Dixon won the fifth series of the BBC One dancing competition Strictly Come Dancing, and subsequently served as a judge on the programme from 2009 to 2012. Since 2012, she has served as a judge on the ITV talent competition Britain's Got Talent. She has also judged on America's Got Talent: The Champions (2020), Walk the Line (2021), and Australia's Got Talent (2022). As a television presenter, Dixon has hosted Alesha's Street Dance Stars (2010), Your Face Sounds Familiar (2013), Text Santa (2014–2015), Dance Dance Dance (2017), The Greatest Dancer (2019–2020), Comic Relief (2019–2025), and the Eurovision Song Contest 2023.

== Life and career ==
=== Early life ===
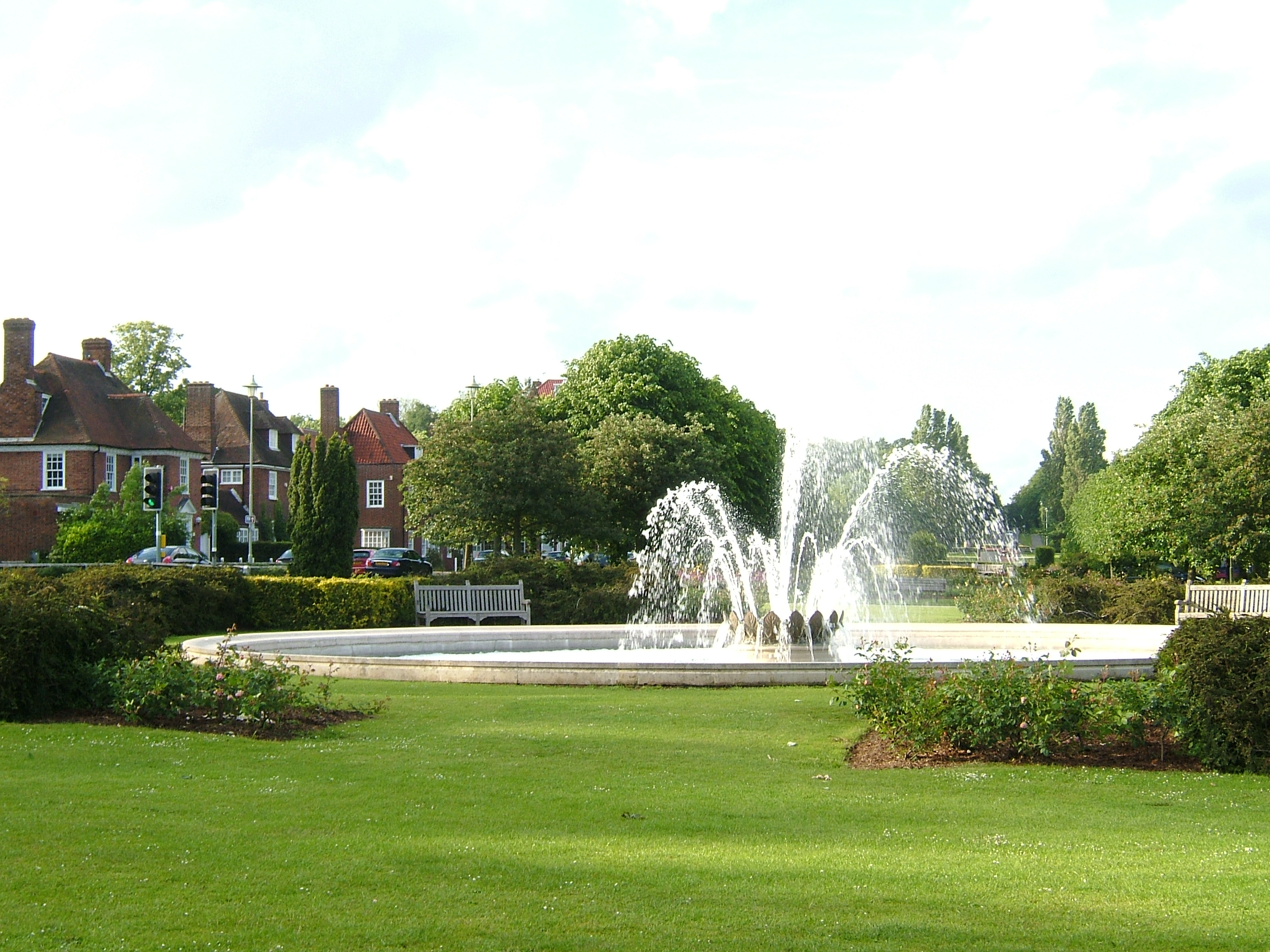
Dixon grew up in the town of Welwyn Garden City, Hertfordshire.

Alesha Anjanette Dixon was born on 7 October 1978 in Welwyn Garden City to a Jamaican father, Melvin Dixon, and English mother, Beverly Harris. Dixon has six half-siblings.

She was educated at Monk's Walk School in Welwyn. Dixon's parents separated when she was four and her father moved away; she has described her family life as "very dysfunctional". Between the ages of eight and ten, Dixon witnessed her mother suffer domestic violence from her partner; she only spoke publicly about the issue 21 years later, in 2010. Dixon created a documentary for the BBC, Don't Hit My Mum, regarding the issue of domestic abuse from a child's perspective, and remarked upon her own childhood: "When I think about that time, I don't remember living in harmony, I don't remember any fun times, I suppose because the negativity has clouded it. The negative times and the scary times have blocked anything that was good ... I believe that every child has the right to grow up in an environment where they feel secure and fearless going into the world, and I didn't really feel that".

Dixon's first job was at Ladbrokes, although she aspired to become a PE teacher after leaving college. After completing a diploma course in sports studies, she had planned to take up a place at Loughborough University, but at dance classes in London she was approached by a talent scout from a production company. While travelling back home on the train she was approached by another scout who was forming a group and asked if she was interested.

=== 1999–2005: Mis-Teeq ===
Dixon's career began in 1999 when she met Sabrina Washington as they both joined a dance school in Fulham, south west London. Together, they decided to form a group when Dixon and Washington, the two co-founders, spotted Su-Elise Nash, a girl auditioning for another group. Dixon and Washington proposed that Nash join the group and together they formed a trio. They were soon signed to Telstar Records with the addition of a new member, Zena McNally, and became the UK garage/R&B girl group, Mis-Teeq.

In October 2000, Dixon, then relatively unknown, featured on the single "Rumours" by Damage, which charted modestly at number 22 on the UK Singles Chart. The genre of the track departed from the group's R&B style, in favour of a garage-based sound, however, the tepid reaction from fans ensured Damage did not venture further into garage.

In January 2001, Mis-Teeq released their first single, "Why". The track remained commercially unnoticed until a garage remix was produced and the track charted at number 8 in January of that year. Two separate music videos for the song were filmed, accompanying the different versions of the song. The song's success coincided with Zena McNally's departure; McNally later alleged that friction between herself and Washington was a factor. Mis-Teeq, continuing as a trio, then released "All I Want", which charted even more successfully at number 2, behind Shaggy's "Angel". In October 2001, they released their debut album Lickin' On Both Sides, featuring hits "One Night Stand", "B with Me" and double A-side single "Roll On/This Is How We Do It". In 2002, Mis-Teeq performed and received a nomination at the BRIT Awards in Earls Court, later in the year band won the MOBO Award for Best Garage Act. After the success of their debut album, 2003 saw Mis-Teeq becoming the faces of JD Sports stores nationwide.

In 2003, Mis-Teeq released their second album Eye Candy, which included the singles "Scandalous", "Can't Get It Back" and "Style". In 2004, Mis-Teeq toured the United States and released their debut single "Scandalous" from their American self-titled debut, a compilation of the albums Lickin' On Both Sides and Eye Candy.

In 2004, Dixon went to feature in the N.E.R.D music video "She Wants to Move". In the video, she is shown dancing on a podium whilst the group circled her. It was also rumoured that she was dating Pharrell Williams around the time of the video. The last song Dixon recorded with Mis-Teeq was "Shoo-Shoo Baby" for the Disney film Valiant. In March 2005, their Greatest Hits compilation was released and it was announced that they were separating to pursue solo careers.

Dixon married Michael Harvey Jr in June 2005. In November 2006, the couple divorced following Harvey's affair with singer Javine Hylton.

=== 2006–2008: Fired Up, record label departure and Strictly Come Dancing ===
I never lost the desire to [want to] carry on in music – that's all I know, all I've ever dreamed of doing, it's all I've ever wanted to do so, I think, never give up.

— Alesha Dixon, discussing her thoughts on being dropped by her record label, Polydor.

Dixon launched her solo career after Mis-Teeq's break-up and signed a £500,000, three-album deal with Polydor Records. She spent a year writing and recording her solo debut album, Fired Up, working with a wide range of producers including Richard X, Xenomania, Johnny Douglas, Brian Higgins, Estelle and Paul Epworth. During this period, Dixon performed mononymously, known simply as "Alesha". In June 2005, she announced her first solo single to be "Superficial". However, at the last minute, the song "Lipstick" was chosen as the first single. "Lipstick" was released on 14 August 2006, and charted at 14 on the UK Single Charts.

Dixon released her second single "Knockdown" on 30 October 2006, which charted at 25 on the UK Download Chart. However, on the official UK Singles Charts, the single peaked at number 45, falling down to 68 the following week. On 6 November 2006, it was revealed that Dixon had been dropped by her label, Polydor Records. Polydor gave her full rights to her unreleased debut album, Fired Up. Coinciding with her professional troubles was the collapse of her marriage to Harvey; Dixon filed for divorce just over a year after her wedding due to her husband's affair with Javine Hylton.

Dixon took part in series 5 of TV show Strictly Come Dancing in 2007, partnered with professional dancer Matthew Cutler. Dixon was at first hesitant to join, fearing that snobbery within the music industry would damage her career. In a later interview, she said, "there's always this preconceived idea that people do reality TV shows because they want to kick-start their careers whereas I was actually worried that it would affect it." They had been the favourite from the third week, receiving the most points from the judges on numerous occasions. Dixon herself gained high appraisal from the judges, even being likened to a "young Josephine Baker" by Bruno Tonioli. They received 4.5 million votes in the final, beating actor Matt Di Angelo and professional dancer Flavia Cacace to win the glitter disco ball.

Week #	Dance / Song	Judges' scores					Result
Week #	Dance / Song	Horwood	Philips	Goodman	Tonioli	Total	Result
2	Rumba / "Hurt"	8	7	8	8	31	Safe
3	Jive / "Shake a Tail Feather"	9	9	9	9	36	Safe
4	American Smooth / "Top Hat, White Tie and Tails"	8	8	8	9	33	Safe
5	Foxtrot / "Heaven"	9	9	9	9	36	Safe
6	Salsa / "Wanna Be Startin' Somethin'"	9	8	9	9	35	Safe
7	Waltz / "A Time For Us"	9	10	9	10	38	Safe
8	Cha-cha-cha / "Crazy in Love"	9	10	10	10	39	Safe
9	Tango / "Jealousy"; Samba / "Reach Out I'll Be There"	9; 9	10; 8	9; 10	10; 9	38; 36	Safe
10	Viennese waltz / "Memory"; Paso doble / "Toccata"	9; 9	9; 9	10; 9	10; 9	38; 36	Bottom two
11	Quickstep / "Valerie"; Argentine tango / "I'd Be Surprisingly Good For You"	9; 9	9; 9	10; 10	10; 10	38; 38	Safe
12	Waltz / "A Time for Us"; Cha-cha-cha / "Crazy in Love"; Jive / "We Love to Boogie"	10; 9; 9	10; 9; 8	9; 10; 9	10; 10; 9	39; 38; 35	WINNER

=== 2008–2009: The Alesha Show and Strictly Come Dancing judging ===
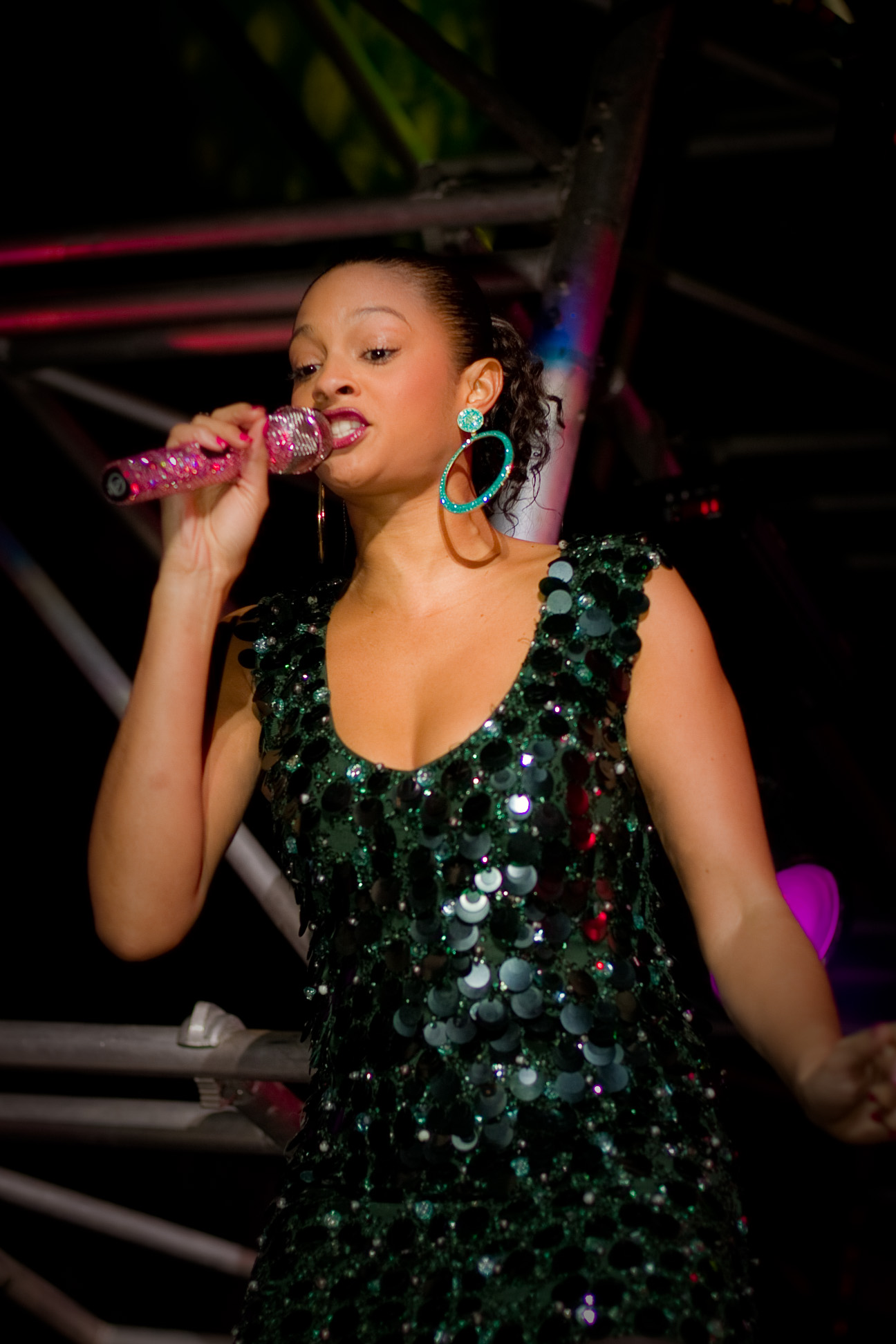
Alesha Dixon performing in Leeds in 2008.

After she won Strictly Come Dancing, Dixon soon became the centre of a bidding war between record labels and even Polydor Records, the label that had dropped her months previously, put in an offer. Dixon, however, chose to sign a four-album contract with Asylum Records in 2008. Dixon's first new album as part of her contract, The Alesha Show was released in the UK on 24 November 2008 and 21 November in Ireland. The official first single from the album, "The Boy Does Nothing" became her first solo top ten hit on the UK Singles Chart, following a 76 spot jump from 84 to 8 on the UK Singles Chart on downloads alone; the single eventually peaked at number 5 and received Gold certification. The song also became a commercial success in continental Europe and peaked in the top ten on the Australian Singles Chart. The single sold 1,000,000 copies worldwide.

The second single from The Alesha Show was "Breathe Slow" and entered the UK Singles Chart at number thirty-nine solely on download sales. The single rose for three weeks before breaking into the top ten at number six, giving Dixon her second top ten hit in the UK from downloads alone, and eventually peaked at number 3 on the Top 40 UK Charts, becoming Dixon's highest charting single on the UK Singles Chart. "Breathe Slow" was certified Silver in the UK for sales exceeding 200,000.

The third single from The Alesha Show, titled "Let's Get Excited" was physically released on 11 May and reached a peak position of 13 in the UK Singles Chart. "Let's Get Excited" became Dixon's first track from The Alesha Show not to chart inside the top 10 in the UK Singles Chart. The song's presence in the charts boosted album sales and The Alesha Show rebounded at a new peak of 11. The album received Platinum certification from BPI, indicating sales of over 300,000 in the UK alone. The fourth single from The Alesha Show, called "To Love Again" was released on 15 November 2009. The track, a ballad penned by Dixon and Gary Barlow, was the first single taken from the deluxe version, entitled The Alesha Show – Encore, released on 23 November. Dixon also embarked upon a 17-date national tour, named The Alesha Show, which began on 20 October 2009 in Nottingham.

It was revealed in July 2009 that Dixon would be joining the Strictly Come Dancing judging panel in September 2009. She replaced Arlene Phillips, which led to the BBC being accused of ageism and sexism by the media. Dixon, having a conflicting schedule also had to rearrange three dates on her upcoming tour, The Alesha Show to do the show, which is broadcast live on Saturday nights. Dixon's judging debut was met by criticism by some viewers, and 272 complaints were received by the BBC, according to The Guardian. Despite the complaints, the BBC stated they were "delighted" with Dixon.

=== 2010–2011: The Entertainer ===
In early 2010, Dixon began work on her third studio album, The Entertainer, which she intended to release during the summer. On 15 March Dixon flew to Denmark to begin recording with Soulshock & Karlin, the producers of Dixon's "Breathe Slow". Dixon's fan site later reported that Dixon had secured a recording session with Rodney Jerkins, a record producer who has produced records for Michael Jackson's final studio album Invincible and most recently produced Lady Gaga and Beyoncé's "Telephone".

On 16 June, Dixon revealed on a post on her fansite that the upcoming album would be called Unleashed, and on 30 June her fansite president revealed the lead single is a track called "Drummer Boy", produced by Haitian-American producer, Shama Joseph, or "ShamRock". On 5 August it was revealed that Dixon had decided to change the album name from Unleashed to The Entertainer. "Drummer Boy", released in August, charted moderately at 15 on the UK Singles Chart. On 16 September, it was announced that Dixon had collaborated with Roll Deep and featured in the band's single "Take Control". The track appeared on both Roll Deep's album—Winner Stays On—and The Entertainer. "Radio", billed as The Entertainer's second single, charted poorly upon release in November 2010, failing to reach the Top 40. The single's release coincided with the release of the album, which too made little commercial impact; a year later it was noted that the album had sold 60,000 copies.

Acknowledging the album's lack of commercial success, Dixon said she would always prefer to "take a chance creatively" than release what she perceived to be stultifying records. She commented: "I knew the single 'Drummer Boy' was a risk. It was a very difficult record and so far removed from anything I'd done before. I get that ... I take full responsibility for that, but I'm glad I did it. I'd rather make a unique record like 'Drummer Boy' and have it fail than play it safe and release bland, generic music that doesn't excite me."

=== 2012–2014: Britain's Got Talent, motherhood and other ventures ===
Dixon wrote and released a new track "Do It Our Way" for the New Year Weight Watchers campaign which featured in new advertisements for the organisation. The track was released onto iTunes on 1 January 2012, as a digital download. On 2 January, Dixon announced her departure from her judging role on Strictly Come Dancing, to pursue other projects. It was later announced that she left the panel to join the judging panel of Britain's Got Talent replacing Michael McIntyre along with Simon Cowell, Amanda Holden and David Walliams. Michael Hogan, of The Daily Telegraph, pointed out that "if rumours are to be believed, Dixon has more than tripled her salary by defecting to the commercial channel", a point made by various other sources.

In September 2012, it was announced that Dixon would be collaborating with former So Solid Crew rapper Ashley Walters on his new song "Your Love". The single was released on 11 November.

It was announced in June 2013 that Dixon was expecting her first child with her partner, backing dancer Azuka Ononye, and on her 35th birthday, 7 October 2013, she stated on Twitter that she had given birth to her daughter, Azura Sienna, the previous week. Dixon said she would put her fourth album on hold and concentrate on motherhood. She and Ononye married in 2017. 11 years after first crossing paths in 2006. Their second daughter Anaya was born, 20 August 2019.

=== 2014–present: Do It for Love and Mis-Teeq reunion ===
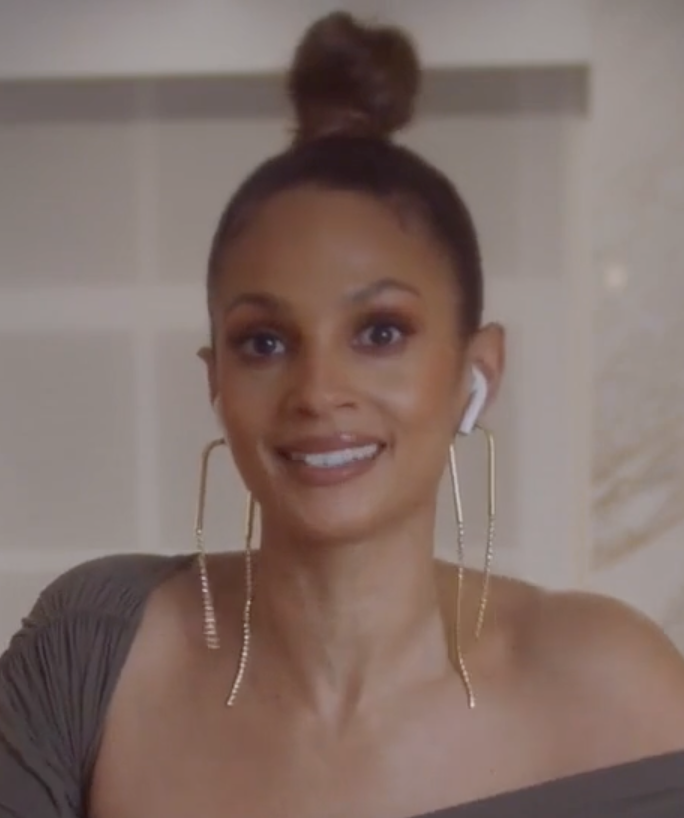
Alesha Dixon in 2020

In December 2014, Dixon announced that she would be releasing a new single in either March or May 2015. In March 2015, she confirmed that her new single "The Way We Are", would be released on 21 June via her own record label Precious Stone Records. It marked Dixon's first single release in over four years, following 2011's "Every Little Part of Me". The first live performance of the song took place on 23 May during one of Britain's Got Talent semi-finals. Dixon was criticised for forgetting the words to "God Save the Queen" when performing a solo at the July 2015 British Grand Prix.

Her fourth studio album titled Do It for Love was released on 9 October 2015. It peaked at number 81 on the UK Albums Chart. The album's second and third singles were, respectively, "Tallest Girl" and the new version of "People Need Love" reworked by Ash Rowes. In 2016, Dixon made a cameo appearance in the 2016 film Absolutely Fabulous: The Movie.

On 24 June 2017, she stepped in for Nicole Scherzinger at The X Factor UK series 14 Manchester auditions for one day. It was later announced that due to Sharon Osbourne having health issues Dixon would once again step in to judge at the Edinburgh auditions. She stepped in for a third time at the second live show on 29 October 2017, this time replacing Cowell.

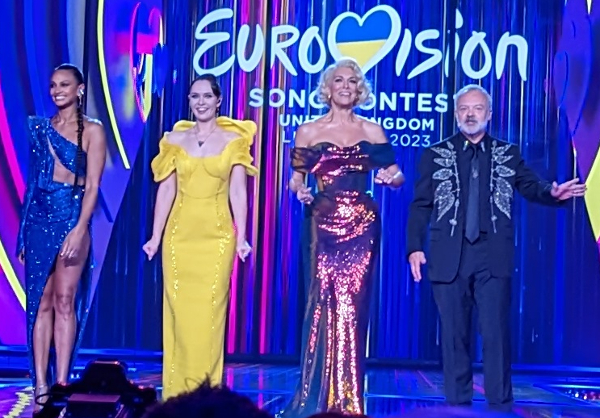
Alesha Dixon (left) hosting Eurovision 2023 alongside Sanina, Waddingham and Norton.

It was announced that Dixon was expecting her second child with her husband during the first live semi-final of Britain's Got Talent in May 2019. On 26 September 2019, it was announced that Dixon would be joining the judging panel for season two of America's Got Talent: The Champions. On 13 June 2021, it was announced that Dixon would be a judge on the tenth season of Australia's Got Talent to replace Lucy Durack.

On 4 November 2021, Dixon appeared as a guest judge on the third series of the BBC drag competition series, RuPaul's Drag Race UK. Dixon’s appearance was met with widespread acclaim. Dixon co-hosted the Eurovision Song Contest 2023 in Liverpool alongside Julia Sanina and Hannah Waddingham with Graham Norton joining them for the final.

On 22 May 2026, Dixon, Washington and Nash announced that they would be reforming as Mis-Teeq for a comeback performance at Wembley Arena in London on 12 September 2026 to celebrate the 25th anniversary of Lickin' on Both Sides.

== Artistry ==
=== Musical style ===
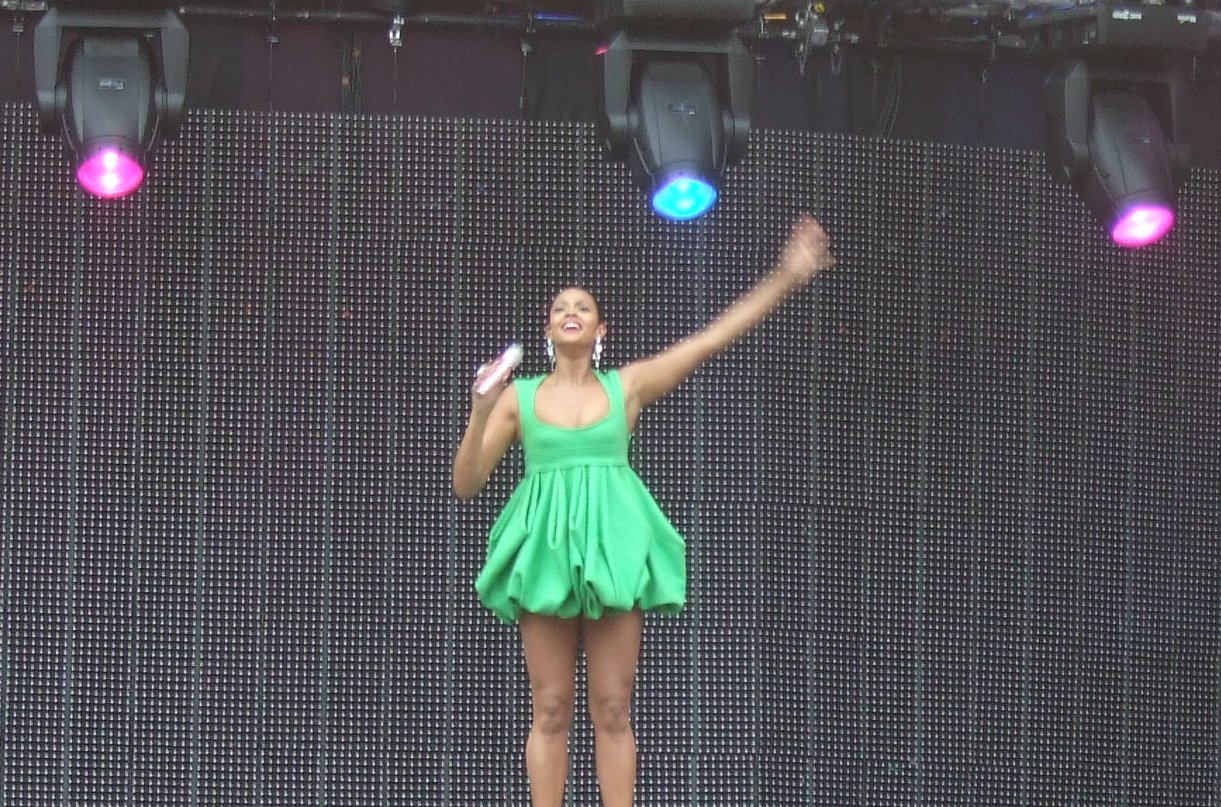
Dixon performing in 2009.

When Dixon first emerged into the public spotlight with Mis-Teeq, she was primarily the group's MC, whilst Sabrina Washington usually sang lead vocals on the records. Washington encouraged her to rap from the group's inception, saying: "When she started she was a bit shy, but I always said that it adds something, an element of difference. It was the first time I'd ever heard a woman MC and I was like, 'Alesha, you have got to do that,' and she was like 'No Bri, don't make me look stupid'". However, when she began her solo career her first UK album, The Alesha Show, saw Dixon undergo a genre-shift. The album featured no rapping and was primarily R&B and soul, unlike Mis-Teeq's music, which focused mainly on garage and hip hop. Dixon commented that the record consisted of "a lot more guitar-written songs with pop produced around it". Dixon's third album The Entertainer consists mainly of dance/pop tracks.

Dixon, a songwriter and singer, often writes or co-writes her own records. Discussing the writing process of The Alesha Show she said, "I've written the majority of it and I co-write as well with a lot of people". Critics have suggested some of her songs are autobiographical, such as "To Love Again" (2009), co-written with Gary Barlow and John Shanks. Vocally, reviewer Andy Gill of The Independent suggested that Dixon's vocal strengths lie with more up-tempo songs, saying "the problem is that her bubbly personality (and voice) is simply not as well suited to ballads as to perky dancefloor anthems". However, The Guardian's Caroline Sullivan complimented her live vocals whilst reviewing her tour, The Alesha Show. She said, of her concert tour, that "it was her singing that made the impression: she's more powerful than you would imagine, and when pitted against her band at their most blaring, she more than held her own. While this was going on, she was being flung between two male hoofers, proving, if nothing else, that pop stars who claim they can't dance and sing simultaneously just aren't trying".

=== Influences ===
Dixon has often cited Madonna as an influence, saying "Madonna is a big idol. I loved her when I was a young girl and I feel like I've been on a musical journey with her". Dixon's single "Let's Get Excited" namechecked the singer and her 1985 single "Into the Groove". Furthermore, the music video featured what Dixon described as "a Madonna tribute" featuring voguing throughout. Additionally, Dixon has described Kylie Minogue as her childhood idol. Growing up, the first record Dixon ever bought was "Push It" by the hip hop group Salt-n-Pepa; she remarked "I didn't understand what they were talking about at the time ... They were raw and did their own thing, and I loved that. I love artists who don't conform to what people expect of them".

Despite growing up in the predominantly white area of Welwyn Garden City, Hertfordshire, Dixon's father Melvin would take her to the Notting Hill Carnival in London to allow her to experience some of her Jamaican heritage. The music she would hear influenced her tastes, as she commented: "all the dancehall records I saved up to buy – Shabba Ranks, Buju Banton – I heard them at Notting Hill". When asked during an interview who her favourite songwriter was, Dixon replied: "Lauryn Hill. I love Lauryn Hill because she is not scared to talk about real life. She may say things that are slightly controversial but she gets people thinking and gets people talking". Dixon has also named Neneh Cherry as great influence upon her. Cherry, a mixed-race singer, inspired her from an early age, with Dixon saying, "I remember seeing Neneh Cherry on the TV when I was little and turning to my mum and saying, 'Mummy, she looks like me'".

== Activism and charity work ==
"There are so many things you could reel off as negatives [with regards to fame] – your private life is exposed, every move is scrutinised – at the same time, you can think: 'Wow, I'm in a position to shine a light into these areas.' That's a powerful tool because, actually, it's quite a selfish job. It's a moral responsibility, I guess, I think I have."

— Dixon, when asked whether celebrities have a responsibility to do good works.

Dixon has described herself and other celebrities as having a "moral responsibility" to do good works, when asked by The Observer's Elizabeth Day. Speaking in August 2010 to Blues & Soul Dixon said: "Being in the entertainment industry I do feel I have a responsibility that comes with my fame".

In 2009, Dixon climbed Mount Kilimanjaro in Tanzania for Comic Relief with Girls Aloud members Cheryl Cole and Kimberley Walsh, Ben Shephard, Ronan Keating, Fearne Cotton, Denise Van Outen, Chris Moyles and Gary Barlow, who had spearheaded the project. Together they raised over £3,500,000 towards helping combat malaria in Tanzania. In June 2009 Dixon became an official ambassador for the charity Help a London Child, stating that she felt "very honoured" to be asked.

Dixon is a patron of the African-Caribbean Leukaemia Trust (ACLT) which is a voluntary charity, whose main aim is to increase the number of Black and Mixed Parentage people on the UK Bone Marrow Register. The members of the ACLT freely volunteer their time in attempting to raise awareness in the Black community; enabling potential donors to come forward and be involved in the process of offering hope and a healthy future to someone whose disorder may otherwise prove fatal. Dixon has also backed Nickelodeon's See Something, Say Something campaign, a UK anti-bullying initiative.

Dixon is engaged with various animal rights organisations and is also a pescetarian. She is Vice-President of the League Against Cruel Sports, a charity which works to end cruelty to animals in the name of sport and featured in a charity appeal due to concerns that the Hunting Act 2004 could be repealed. In 2012, Dixon travelled to Romania with World Animal Protection to rescue two brown bears from Onesti Zoo, which had closed years previously. The bears were moved to a nearby sanctuary. In 2014, Dixon encouraged her Twitter followers to sign an online petition calling for the ban of slaughtering animals without being stunned first. UK and EU law requires that animals must be stunned before slaughter, unless for religious purposes (Halal or Kosher meat). Dixon is also a supporter of the PetRetreat scheme launched by the Royal Society for the Prevention of Cruelty to Animals (RSPCA). The scheme fosters pets belonging to victims of domestic abuse, who often have to leave behind animals, as many refuges and safe houses do not allow pets. The pets are later reunited with their original owners when possible.

In addition to Dixon's commercial role as a model and representative for the cosmetics company Avon on International Women's Day 2012, Dixon launched the company's Pass It On campaign to highlight domestic abuse issues in the UK by encouraging the purchase of a necklace, described by her as "a symbol of women's empowerment, and infinite possibilities for women". All the proceeds from Avon's necklace campaign were donated to Refuge and Women's Aid. In March 2013 Dixon led a walk down Westminster Bridge to the Houses of Parliament to raise awareness of domestic violence. Regarding the walk, Dixon commented that "awareness of domestic violence is still shockingly low and that's why it's so important that we raise awareness about a subject that is too often ignored".

Dixon has worked with several LGBT charities in the past, including Switchboard and RUComingOut. Dixon has spoken out in support of same-sex marriage, gender equality, as well as a need for greater support of trans individuals, and those questioning their gender identity. Dixon's popularity within the LGBT community has led to her performing at numerous gay pride parades across the UK, headlining both London Pride and Brighton Pride in 2016 alone.

In September 2020, Dixon wore a necklace that spelt out "BLM" on an episode of Britain's Got Talent, in reference to the Black Lives Matter movement. Ofcom, the British broadcasting regular, received 1,901 complaints about her choice of necklace. Dixon's actions were seen as her showing her solidarity with the dance troupe Diversity, who had the previous week performed a routine referencing the murder of George Floyd, which had similarly prompted complaints.

== Other ventures ==
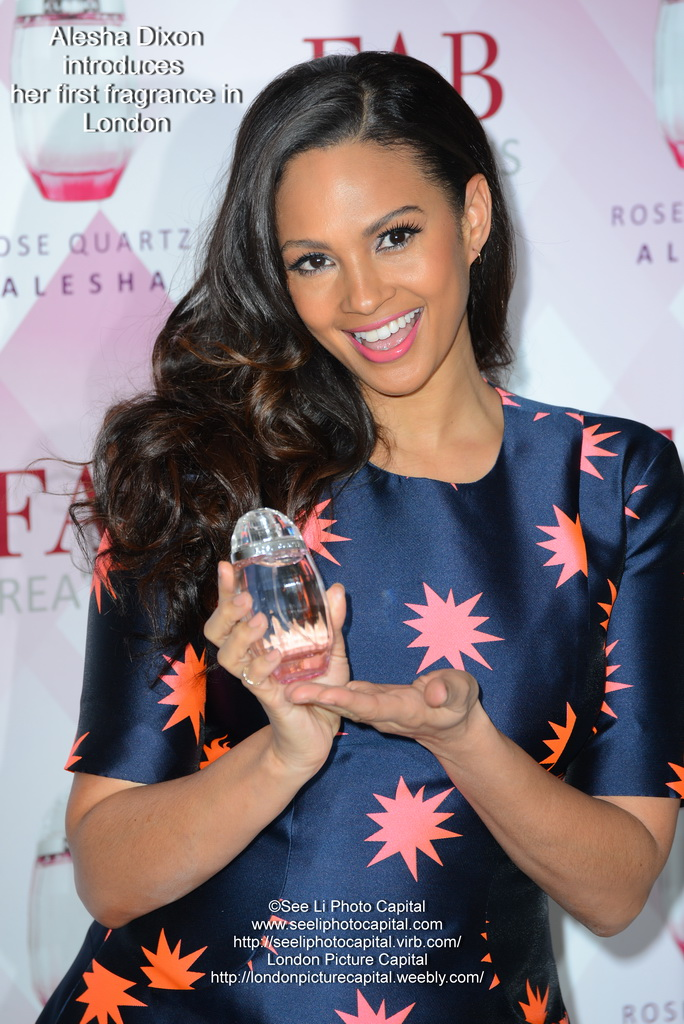
Dixon at her fragrance launch in 2014

As well as a singer, Dixon has forayed into television presenting, created three documentaries, and has established herself as a businesswoman through various endorsement deals and lucrative contracts. In November 2009 Dixon announced the release of her jewellery line, and in January 2014 she launched her own fragrance, Rose Quartz. Dixon has represented various brands, including car manufacturers Ford, the Toblerone chocolate bar, cosmetics company Avon and airline Thomson Airways. Additionally, Dixon was creative director of gym chain LA Fitness, a role which she assumed in 2009. Dixon signed a four-year results-based deal with the gym chain, with her remuneration based on the success of the company. Dixon voiced the character of Bliss in the UK version of the 2016 version of Powerpuff Girls.

=== Presenting ===
Dixon has presented shows in the UK, such as the MOBO Awards (in 2002, 2010 and 2011), CD:UK, ITV2's coverage of the Brit Awards and presented the Live From the Red Carpet show at the 62nd British Academy Film Awards for E!. She has also been a guest on BBC One's current affairs programme This Week on two occasions, in November 2006 and December 2007. In 2008, Dixon presented her own mini-documentary entitled Alesha: Look But Don't Touch, which was first aired on BBC Three and featured a guest appearance from Cheryl Cole. The show explored "improvement" by digital technology in order to understand the impact all these "perfect" images have on society. In 2009, it was reported that Dixon was in talks with television companies about a possible chatshow.

In 2008 and 2009, she co-presented Children in Need with Terry Wogan and Tess Daly. She returned to present the telethon in 2011 with Daly, Wogan and Fearne Cotton. In March 2010, Dixon co-presented the Mister World 2010 pageant in Incheon, Korea. Since 22 August 2011, Dixon presented a street-dance competition for CBBC called Alesha's Street Dance Stars. She has also appeared in the CBBC series 12 Again. On 17 May 2013, Dixon was a guest presenter on ITV Breakfast magazine show Lorraine. In the summer of 2013, Dixon and Paddy McGuinness co-presented one series of the ITV reality show Your Face Sounds Familiar.

In 2014 and 2015, Dixon co-presented segments of ITV's Text Santa telethon. In 2016, she co-presented Sport Relief 2016 on BBC One with Greg James. In 2017, Dixon co-presented Dance Dance Dance, a six-part reality series for ITV alongside Will Best. In 2019, Dixon co-hosted BBC’s Saturday night show The Greatest Dancer. On 22 February 2023, it was confirmed that Dixon would co-host the Eurovision Song Contest 2023 in Liverpool, alongside actress Hannah Waddingham and Ukrainian singer Julia Sanina, with Graham Norton joining them to present the grand final.

== Discography ==
- Fired Up (2008)
- The Alesha Show (2008)
- The Entertainer (2010)
- Do It for Love (2015)

== Filmography ==
=== Television ===
Year	Title	Role	Notes
2002, 2010, 2011	MOBO Awards	Presenter / Performer	
2003	Bo' Selecta!	Herself	2 episodes
2003–2006	CD:UK	Guest Presenter	4 episodes
2006	The Slammer	Herself	Series 1, Episode 5
2006	The One Show	Herself	Guest; 2 episodes
2006–2007	This Week	Guest Presenter	2 episodes
2007, 2009–2011	Strictly Come Dancing	Contestant / Judge	Winner of series 5 Judge on series 7-9
2007–2024	Loose Women	Herself	Guest; 19 episodes
2008	The Graham Norton Show	Herself	Guest; 1 episode
2008	Friday Night Project	Herself	Guest; 1 episode
2008	Alesha Dixon: Look But Don't Touch	Presenter	Documentary
2009	Alesha Dixon: Who's Your Daddy?	Presenter	Documentary
2009	Children in Need	Co-presenter	Alongside Terry Wogan and Tess Daly
2009	Bookaboo	Herself	Guest; 2 episodes
2009	Let's Dance for Sport Relief	Herself	
2010	Alesha Dixon: Don't Hit My Mum	Presenter	Documentary
2010–2011	Never Mind the Buzzcocks	Herself	Guest; 3 episodes
2011	Alesha's Street Dance Stars	Presenter	1 series
2012	Britain and Ireland's Next Top Model	Guest Judge	Series 8, Episode 3
2012	12 Again	Herself	Series 1, Episode 3
2012–present	Britain's Got Talent	Judge	
2013	Your Face Sounds Familiar	Co-presenter	Alongside Paddy McGuinness
2013	Lorraine	Guest Presenter	1 episode
2013	Hacker Time	Herself	Series 3, Episode 10
2014	Piers Morgan's Life Stories	Herself	1 episode
2014	Good Luck Charlie	Herself	1 episode
2014–2015	Text Santa	Co-presenter	Alongside Paddy McGuinness
2015	Doc McStuffins	Winnie (voice)	Episode: "Winded Winnie"; UK version
2015–2021	Ant & Dec's Saturday Night Takeaway	Herself / Guest Announcer	6 episodes
2016	Black Is the New Black	Herself	4 episodes
2016	Lip Sync Battle UK	Competitor	1 episode
2016	Sport Relief 2016	Co-presenter	Alongside Greg James
2016	The Powerpuff Girls	Bliss (voice)	UK version; 8 episodes
2016	A League of Their Own	Herself	Guest; 1 episode
2017	Michael McIntyre's Big Show	Herself	Guest; 1 episode
2017	Jamie & Jimmy's Friday Night Feast	Herself	Guest; 1 episode
2017	The X Factor	Guest Judge	Series 14
2017	Dance Dance Dance	Co-presenter	Alongside Will Best
2018	The Russell Howard Hour	Herself	Guest; 1 episode
2019	Britain's Got Talent: The Champions	Judge	
2019	Blockbusters	Contestant	Celebrity special
2019	CBeebies Bedtime Story	Storyteller	2 episodes
2019–2020	The Greatest Dancer	Co-presenter	Alongside Jordan Banjo
2019–2025	Comic Relief	Co-presenter	
2020	America's Got Talent: The Champions	Judge	Season 2
2021	RuPaul's Drag Race UK	Guest Judge	Series 3, Episode 7
2021	Steph's Packed Lunch	Herself	Guest; 1 episode
2021	Walk the Line	Judge	
2022	Australia's Got Talent	Judge	Season 10
2022	That's My Jam	Contestant	1 episode
2022	The Wheel	Contestant	1 episode
2022	Britain Get Singing	Judge	TV special
2022	Britain's Got Talent: The Ultimate Magician	Judge	TV special
2022	The National Lottery’s New Year's Eve Big Bash	Co-presenter	Alongside Jason Manford
2023	Eurovision Song Contest 2023	Co-presenter	Alongside Hannah Waddingham, Julia Sanina and Graham Norton
2025	You Bet!	Guest Panellist	1 episode
2026	Mission Motherland	Herself	1 episode

=== Film ===
Year	Title	Role	Notes
2016	Absolutely Fabulous: The Movie	Herself	Cameo appearance
2018	Dear Sisters	Herself	Short

== Concert tours ==
=== Headlining ===
- The Alesha Show (2009)

=== Supporting ===
- Enrique Iglesias UK Tour (2009)

== Bibliography ==
- Lightning Girl (2018)
- Lightning Girl 2: Superhero Squad (2018)
- Lightning Girl 3: Secret Supervillain (2019)
- Lightning Girl 4: Superpower Showdown (2019)
- Star Switch (2020)
- Girls Rule (2021)
- Luna Wolf: Animal Wizard (2023)
- Luna Wolf: Code Danger (2024)

== Awards and nominations ==
Year	Ceremony	Award	Nominated work	Result
2006	MOBO Awards	Best UK Female	Herself	Nominated
2008	Cosmopolitan Awards	Ultimate Confidence Queen	Herself	Won
2009	MOBO Awards	Best UK Act	Herself	Nominated
2009	MOBO Awards	Best Video	"The Boy Does Nothing"	Nominated
2009	UK Music Video Awards	Best Pop Video	"The Boy Does Nothing"	Nominated
2009	UK Music Video Awards	Best Styling in a Video	"The Boy Does Nothing"	Nominated
2009	Los Premios 40 Principales	Best International Song	"The Boy Does Nothing"	Nominated
2010	BRIT Awards	British Single	"Breathe Slow"	Nominated
2010	MOBO Awards	Best Video	"Drummer Boy"	Nominated
2010	BT Visit London Awards	Sound of London	Herself	Won
