= Drummer Boy (Alesha Dixon song) =

2010 single by Alesha Dixon

Single by Alesha Dixon

from the album The Entertainer
- Released: 23 August 2010
- Recorded: 2010
- Genre: Dancehall
- Length: 3:12
- Label: Asylum; SME
- Songwriters: Shama "Sak Pase" Joseph; Nate Walka; Deodrick Jackson; James Riles
- Producer: Sak Pasé

Alesha Dixon singles chronology
"To Love Again" (2009)	"Drummer Boy" (2010)	"Take Control" (2010)

"Drummer Boy" is song by English singer-songwriter Alesha Dixon. It was released on 3 September 2010 as the lead single from her third studio album, The Entertainer. The first teasers for the song surfaced on Dixon's fansite in late July, and Dixon announced, via her various social networking sites, that the song would receive its radio play premiere on 23 July on BBC Radio 1 with Fearne Cotton. "Drummer Boy" debuted on the Irish Singles Chart at number twenty-three on 10 September 2010. The single peaked at Number 15 on the UK Singles Chart, making it Dixon's lowest peaking lead single from an album to date.

== Background ==
Discussing the song's history, Dixon has said: "ShamRock a.k.a. Sak Pase – who's one of Akon's proteges – produced the track. And, as soon as I walked into the studio with him and Nate Walker (the track's co-writer) I instantly just felt something special!... You know, I'm always looking for something that's just full of life; that's different, quirky, and that can't be put in a box... Plus I loved the TOUGHNESS of it! I particularly loved the fact that it is female-empowering, but not in a feminist trying-to-wave-the-flag-and-be rude-about-men kind of way."

== Critical reception ==
"Drummer Boy" has garnered a mostly positive reception, with critics such as Fraser McAlpine of the BBC and Popjustice heavily praising it. McAlpine awarded the song 5 stars on his BBC review, saying he was "delighted to report that it is enjoyment all the way". McAlpine praised what he called "her mad brilliance" and concluded with, "best of all, there is no possibility that you could confuse this song with anything else in the charts this year. And for that reason alone it deserves top honours". Popjustice described the song as "a bit of a grower", stating that on their first listen to the song they dubbed it "2010s worst piece of recorded music", and by their seventh listen they simply wrote, in capital letters, "THIS IS AMAZING". Popjustice also named it their 'Song of the Day' for 22 July, stating that "Chartwise this'll be either a massive hit of a fantastic miss", but regardless it is "up there with the best". The site also noted the sexual double entendres throughout the lyrics of the song. 4Music stated "Alesha is back with a track that's about as subtle as a sledgehammer", and also highly praised the video.

Digital Spy criticised the song's 20 second intro, writing: "Irritating? Extremely". Its consensus was, "It'll definitely get Dixon noticed, but for all the right reasons? We're not so sure"; it awarded the single 3 out of 5 stars. Popjustice, who gave a favourable review, also called the intro "terrible", and showed how to start the song from 19.5 seconds on an iTunes format, thus skipping the intro. However, the online website SoFeminine.co.uk disagreed with Digital Spy's view, describing the track as "a fantastically quirky slice of pop which we think is destined to become a dancefloor anthem".

== Music video ==
Alesha sat in her bright red armchair in the video. Dixon enlisted Ray Kay, feeling he was the best director for the shoot, which she wanted to be full of vibrant colours.

The music video for "Drummer Boy" was filmed by Norwegian director Ray Kay, with the shoot taking place in Los Angeles. The video shoot consisted of a 21-hour shoot, in which Dixon stated she "had the best time", but that she "couldn't feel [her] feet" after the strenuous shoot. The music video contains seven different costume changes by Dixon, 10 accompanying dancers, as well as 20 drummers. In an interview with 4Music, Dixon explained the concept behind the music video: "The song is so energetic and I wanted to shoot it with Ray Kay because he's great at shooting really colourful videos. I knew that I wanted lots of drummers and dancers and I just wanted it to feel really tough and represent strength through the styling and dancing. It was the best video that I've done in terms of fun".

The Daily Mirror reported that, whilst on the shoot, Alesha accidentally knocked out one of her dancers, saying, "she flung her arm out and clocked one of the girls with a giant ring, leaving her out cold". Dixon later confirmed the Mirror's story, saying "I got her right in the head. She just fell back and didn't move. She was lying there, really trying to fight back the tears. I started crying because I felt so bad! She had a massive bump on her head immediately. But she was back up by the end of the video because she's a professional".

=== Synopsis ===
The video begins in black and white, with the words "Alesha" written across the middle of the screen. Dixon is seen stood to the far-left, whilst a man playing the drums is stood opposite. Dixon then announces: "I think I need a better drummer", with the man stood opposite replying, "Say what?" Dixon repeats herself, and by this point the words "Alesha" have vanished, replaced by the words "Drummer Boy". Then the scene changes and it transitions from monochrome to normal colour, with different images of her dancers flashing quickly between monochrome and colour, whilst they get splattered with vibrant coloured paint; this time the words read: "A Ray Kay video", before disappearing altogether. Thereafter, the video contains Dixon in various scenarios, the first being Dixon dressed in black and red, sitting in a red armchair, flanked by two men, both wearing black and red, with a black background wall. The background wall changes intermittently throughout the video, ranging from red, pink, yellow, blue, lilac and peach. Various other similar scenes continue with Dixon dressed in flamboyant costumes, interspersed with shots of her drummers and her dance troupe, which Dixon dances with in some scenes.

=== Release and reception ===
The music video's television premiere took place a day later at 11:15am on 4Music and later on 4 Music's sister channel, Channel 4, at 12:50pm on 7 August. 4Music stated that "the video is an ultra slick affair which, as you might expect, boasts a whole troupe of sexy drummer boys".

== Track listing ==
- UK CD single / Digital single (1)
1. "Drummer Boy (Album Version)" – 3:45
2. "Drummer Boy (Yolanda Be Cool & DCUP Remix)" – 5:06
- 2-Track UK Card Sleeve Promo CD
1. "Drummer Boy (Radio Edit)" – 3:13
2. "Drummer Boy (Album Version)" – 3:45
- Digital single (2)
1. "Drummer Boy (Album Version)" – 3:45
2. "Drummer Boy (Wizzy Wow Remix) (Feat. Wretch 32)" – 3:23
- Digital single (3)
1. "Drummer Boy (Album Version)" – 3:45
2. "Drummer Boy (Swindle Dub Remix)" – 4:39
- UK iTunes Digital EP
1. "Drummer Boy (Album Version)" – 3:45
2. "Drummer Boy (Yolanda Be Cool & DCUP Remix)" – 5:06
3. "Drummer Boy (Benny Benassi Remix)" – 6:19
4. "Drummer Boy (Crazy Cousinz Remix)" – 3:25
5. "Drummer Boy (Swindle Remix)" – 4:35
6. "Drummer Boy (MoDrums Remix)" – 3:29
7. "Drummer Boy (Music Video)" – 3:48

== Personnel ==
- Songwriting – Sham E. Joseph, Nate Walka, Deodrick Jackson, James Riles
- Production – Sham E. Joseph
- Additional production – Nate Walka
- Vocal production – Kuk Harrell, Nigel Butler (additional), Ray Hedges (additional)
- Engineering and mixing – Josh Gudwin
- Assistant engineering – Dustin Capulong, Ghazi Hourani
- Mastering – Miles Showell

== Charts ==
Chart (2010)	Peak position
European Hot 100 Singles (Billboard)	48
Ireland (IRMA)	23
Scotland Singles (OCC)	11
Spain (Promusicae)	26
UK Singles (OCC)	15

== Release history ==
Region	Date	Format	Label
Spain	23 August 2010	Digital download	Warner Music
Ireland	3 September 2010	Digital download	Atlantic Records
United Kingdom	5 September 2010	Digital download	Asylum Records
United Kingdom	6 September 2010	CD single	Asylum Records
